= 2024 Indian Premier League =

Twenty20 cricket tournament

- Tournament logo
- Dates: 22 March – 26 May 2024
- Administrator: Board of Control for Cricket in India
- Cricket format: Twenty20
- Tournament format(s): Group stage and Playoffs
- Champions: Kolkata Knight Riders (3rd title)
- Runners-up: Sunrisers Hyderabad
- Participants: 10
- Matches: 74
- Most valuable player: Sunil Narine (Kolkata Knight Riders)
- Most runs: Virat Kohli (Royal Challengers Bengaluru) (741)
- Most wickets: Harshal Patel (Punjab Kings) (24)
- Official website: iplt20.com

The 2024 Indian Premier League, also known as IPL 17 and branded as TATA IPL 2024 was the 17th edition of the Indian Premier League, a professional Twenty20 cricket league. The tournament featured ten teams competing in 74 matches from 22 March to 26 May across 13 venues.

The defending champions Chennai Super Kings were eliminated in the league stage. In the final, Kolkata Knight Riders defeated Sunrisers Hyderabad by 8 wickets to win their third IPL title. Virat Kohli of Royal Challengers Bengaluru scored the most runs (741), while Harshal Patel of Punjab Kings took the most wickets (24). Sunil Narine of Kolkata was named as the most valuable player of the tournament.

== Background ==
The Indian Premier League is a professional Twenty20 (T20) cricket league held in India, organised by the Board of Control for Cricket in India (BCCI). It is held annually since the first edition in 2008. Chennai Super Kings were the defending champions, having won their fifth title in the previous season after beating Gujarat Titans in the final.

=== Format ===
The format returned to the same as 2022, unlike 2023, with the group order being re-shuffled. Each team played twice against the teams in their group and the team in the same row in the other group, and once against the remaining four teams in the other group. After the group stage, the top four teams based on aggregate points qualified for the playoffs. In this stage, the top two teams competed with each other (in a match titled "Qualifier 1"), as did the remaining two teams (in a match titled "Eliminator"). While the winner of Qualifier 1 directly qualified for the final match, the losing team had another chance to qualify for the final match by competing against the winning team of the Eliminator match (in a match titled "Qualifier 2"). The winner of this subsequent Qualifier 2 match advanced to the final match.

Group A	Group B
Mumbai Indians	Sunrisers Hyderabad
Kolkata Knight Riders	Royal Challengers Bengaluru
Rajasthan Royals	Punjab Kings
Delhi Capitals	Gujarat Titans
Lucknow Super Giants	Chennai Super Kings

==== Rule changes ====
Bowlers could now bowl two bouncers per over, as trialled in India's domestic T20 tournament, the 2023–24 Syed Mushtaq Ali Trophy.

=== Schedule ===
There was a possibility of the tournament being held abroad due to a possibility of inadequate security, as a result of a clash with Lok Sabha Election 2024. On 14 February 2024, the chairman of the Indian Premier League announced that the tournament would take place in India and that the schedule would be finalized after a discussion with the Indian government and other agencies, with the allocation of matches to states to depend on the election schedule to be released by the Election Commission of India. On 21 February, it was announced that the schedule would be announced in two halves as the dates of the elections has not been confirmed till then.

A part of the schedule of the season's fixtures was announced on 22 February 2024 which included the schedule for the first 17 days, consisting of 21 matches. The opening match of the tournament was to be played on 22 March at the M. A. Chidambaram Stadium in Chennai between defending champions Chennai Super Kings and the Royal Challengers Bengaluru. The remaining fixtures were announced on 25 March with the last group match to be played between Rajasthan Royals and Kolkata Knight Riders on 19 May at ACA Stadium, Guwahati. It was announced that both Qualifier 1 and Eliminator would be played at the Narendra Modi Stadium, Ahmedabad from 21 to 22 May, and that Qualifier 2 and final would be played in Chennai, with the venue hosting its third IPL final after 2011 and 2012.

=== Marketing ===
The Tata Group renewed their contract as the title sponsors of the Indian Premier League for a tenure of 5 years (2024–28) for ₹2,500 crore (US$270 million) — the highest-ever sponsorship amount in the history of the league. The TATA Group previously held the title sponsorship rights for the IPL in 2022 and 2023. The advertising campaign for the 2024 IPL consisted of 18 sponsors and 250 advertisers including most notably — Dream11, Tata Motors, HDFC Bank, SBI, Thums Up, Pepsi, Parle Products, Google Pixel, Haier, and Vodafone.

=== Broadcasting ===
The media rights for 2023 to 2027 seasons were acquired by Viacom18 and Star Sports for ₹48,390 crore (US$5.2 billion), giving a valuation of ₹104 crore (US$11 million) for each IPL match. Star Sports broadcast the season on TV, while Viacom18 streamed it through JioCinema. Star Sports reported a 16.8 crore viewership on the opening day, highest-ever for the first day of any season. The 2024 IPL season had a total viewership of 546 million in Star Sports and 620 million in JioCinema, registering a 18% increase from the previous edition.

== Teams ==
The same 10 teams from the previous season returned, with few changes to the team personnel.

Group	Team	2023 performance	Head coach	Captain
A	Delhi Capitals	9th	Ricky Ponting	Rishabh Pant
A	Kolkata Knight Riders	7th	Chandrakant Pandit	Shreyas Iyer
A	Lucknow Super Giants	4th	Justin Langer	KL Rahul
A	Mumbai Indians	3rd	Mark Boucher	Hardik Pandya
A	Rajasthan Royals	5th	Kumar Sangakkara	Sanju Samson
B	Chennai Super Kings	Champions	Stephen Fleming	Ruturaj Gaikwad
B	Gujarat Titans	Runner-up	Ashish Nehra	Shubman Gill
B	Punjab Kings	8th	Trevor Bayliss	Shikhar Dhawan
B	Royal Challengers Bengaluru	6th	Andy Flower	Faf du Plessis
B	Sunrisers Hyderabad	10th	Daniel Vettori	Pat Cummins

=== Personnel changes ===
The ten franchises retained 173 players for the 2024 IPL season, and seven players were traded across teams before the auction. On 11 December 2023, the IPL governing council released a list of 333 players, including 214 Indian and 119 foreign players who were available for the auction. The auction was held outside India for the first time, at the Coca-Cola Arena, Dubai, United Arab Emirates on 19 December 2023. 72 players were sold at the auction for a spend of ₹230 crore (US$25 million) including 30 overseas players. Mitchell Starc became the most expensive player in the history of IPL when he was bought by Kolkata Knight Riders for ₹24.75 crore (US$2.6 million), surpassing ₹20.50 crore (US$2.2 million) paid by Sunrisers Hyderabad for Pat Cummins earlier in the same auction, and ₹18.50 crore (US$2.0 million) paid by Punjab Kings for Sam Curran in the 2023 auction.

== Venues ==
The league stage was played at 13 stadiums across India. The opening match was played at M.A. Chidambaram Stadium, Chennai. Delhi Capitals played their first two home games at the ACA-VDCA Cricket Stadium due to the Arun Jaitley Stadium in Delhi being unavailable immediately after hosting the 2024 Women's Premier League. The ACA Cricket Stadium and the HPCA Cricket Stadium hosted two home matches each for Rajasthan Royals and Punjab Kings respectively. The first two matches of the playoffs were played in Ahmedabad with Chennai hosting the final leg of the playoffs including the final.

Ahmedabad	Bengaluru	Chennai	Delhi	Dharamshala
Gujarat Titans	Royal Challengers Bengaluru	Chennai Super Kings	Delhi Capitals	Punjab Kings
Narendra Modi Stadium	M. Chinnaswamy Stadium	M. A. Chidambaram Stadium	Arun Jaitley Stadium	HPCA Cricket Stadium
Capacity: 132,000	Capacity: 40,000	Capacity: 39,000	Capacity: 35,200	Capacity: 21,200
Narendra Modi Stadium in 2023	M. Chinnaswamy Stadium in 2017	M. A. Chidambaram Stadium in 2023	Arun Jaitley Stadium in 2023	HPCA Cricket Stadium in 2015
Guwahati	A map of India with pin-points on 2024 Indian Premier League venues			Hyderabad
Rajasthan Royals	A map of India with pin-points on 2024 Indian Premier League venues			Sunrisers Hyderabad
ACA Cricket Stadium	A map of India with pin-points on 2024 Indian Premier League venues			Rajiv Gandhi Stadium
Capacity: 46,000	A map of India with pin-points on 2024 Indian Premier League venues			Capacity: 55,000
ACA Cricket Stadium in 2018	A map of India with pin-points on 2024 Indian Premier League venues			Rajiv Gandhi Stadium in 2024
Jaipur	A map of India with pin-points on 2024 Indian Premier League venues			Kolkata
Rajasthan Royals	A map of India with pin-points on 2024 Indian Premier League venues			Kolkata Knight Riders
Sawai Mansingh Stadium	A map of India with pin-points on 2024 Indian Premier League venues			Eden Gardens
Capacity: 25,000	A map of India with pin-points on 2024 Indian Premier League venues			Capacity: 68,000
Sawai Mansingh Stadium in 2013	A map of India with pin-points on 2024 Indian Premier League venues			Eden Gardens in 2023
Lucknow	Mullanpur	Mumbai	Visakhapatnam	
Lucknow Super Giants	Punjab Kings	Mumbai Indians	Delhi Capitals	
BRSABV Ekana Cricket Stadium	Maharaja Yadavindra Singh Stadium	Wankhede Stadium	ACA–VDCA Cricket Stadium	
Capacity: 50,000	Capacity: 38,000	Capacity: 33,108	Capacity: 27,500	
Ekana Cricket Stadium in 2018		Wankhede Stadium in 2011	ACA–VDCA Cricket Stadium in 2016	

== Opening ceremony ==
External videos
- IPL 2024 – Opening ceremony on JioCinema (subscription required).

In January 2024, the BCCI invited bids for staging the opening ceremony. The following month, Kasi Viswanathan, the CEO of Chennai Super Kings stated that the opening ceremony would be held in Chennai by virtue of being the home of the defending champions. The opening ceremony took place on 22 March at the M. A. Chidambaram Stadium in Chennai and was followed by the opening match between Chennai Super Kings and Royal Challengers Bengaluru.

Actors Tiger Shroff and Akshay Kumar promoted and performed for a song sequence from their film Bade Miyan Chote Miyan. Singer Sonu Nigam delivered a rendition of "Vande Mataram", followed by A. R. Rahman and Mohit Chauhan's joint-performance of "Maa Tujhe Salaam", and solo performances of "Jai Ho" and "Masakali" respectively. Singer Neeti Mohan also performed at the event.

== League stage ==
=== Points table ===
Pos	Grp	Team	Pld	W	L	NR	Pts	NRR	Qualification
1	A	Kolkata Knight Riders (C)	14	9	3	2	20	1.428	Advanced to Qualifier 1
2	B	Sunrisers Hyderabad (R)	14	8	5	1	17	0.414	Advanced to Qualifier 1
3	A	Rajasthan Royals (3rd)	14	8	5	1	17	0.273	Advanced to Eliminator
4	B	Royal Challengers Bengaluru (4th)	14	7	7	0	14	0.459	Advanced to Eliminator
5	B	Chennai Super Kings	14	7	7	0	14	0.392	Eliminated
6	A	Delhi Capitals	14	7	7	0	14	−0.377	Eliminated
7	A	Lucknow Super Giants	14	7	7	0	14	−0.667	Eliminated
8	B	Gujarat Titans	14	5	7	2	12	−1.063	Eliminated
9	B	Punjab Kings	14	5	9	0	10	−0.353	Eliminated
10	A	Mumbai Indians	14	4	10	0	8	−0.318	Eliminated

Source: ESPNcricinfo
(C) Champions; (R) Runners-up

=== Match summary ===
Team	Group matches														Playoffs			
Team	1	2	3	4	5	6	7	8	9	10	11	12	13	14	Q1	E	Q2	F
Chennai Super Kings	2	4	4	4	6	8	8	8	10	10	12	12	14	14				
Delhi Capitals	0	0	2	2	2	4	6	6	8	10	10	12	12	14				
Gujarat Titans	2	2	4	4	4	6	6	8	8	8	8	10	11	12				
Kolkata Knight Riders	2	4	6	6	8	8	10	10	12	14	16	18	19	20	W			W
Lucknow Super Giants	0	2	4	6	6	6	8	10	10	12	12	12	12	14				
Mumbai Indians	0	0	0	2	4	4	6	6	6	6	6	8	8	8				
Punjab Kings	2	2	2	4	4	4	4	4	6	8	8	8	10	10				
Rajasthan Royals	2	4	6	8	8	10	12	14	16	16	16	16	16	17		W	L	
Royal Challengers Bengaluru	0	2	2	2	2	2	2	2	4	6	8	10	12	14		L		
Sunrisers Hyderabad	0	2	2	4	6	8	10	10	10	12	12	14	15	17	L		W	L

Win	Loss	No result

- Note: The total points at the end of each group match are listed.
- Note: Click on the points (group matches) or W/L (playoffs) to see the match summary.

Visitor team →	CSK	DC	GT	KKR	LSG	MI	PBKS	RR	RCB	SRH
Home team ↓	CSK	DC	GT	KKR	LSG	MI	PBKS	RR	RCB	SRH
Chennai Super Kings			Chennai; 63 runs	Chennai; 7 wickets	Lucknow; 6 wickets		Punjab; 7 wickets	Chennai; 5 wickets	Chennai; 6 wickets	Chennai; 78 runs
Delhi Capitals	Delhi; 20 runs		Delhi; 4 runs	Kolkata; 106 runs	Delhi; 19 runs	Delhi; 10 runs		Delhi; 20 runs		Hyderabad; 67 runs
Gujarat Titans	Gujarat; 35 runs	Delhi; 6 wickets		Match abandoned		Gujarat; 6 runs	Punjab; 3 wickets		Bengaluru; 9 wickets	Gujarat; 7 wickets
Kolkata Knight Riders		Kolkata; 7 wickets			Kolkata; 8 wickets	Kolkata; 18 runs	Punjab; 8 wickets	Rajasthan; 2 wickets	Kolkata; 1 run	Kolkata; 4 runs
Lucknow Super Giants	Lucknow; 8 wickets	Delhi; 6 wickets	Lucknow; 33 runs	Kolkata; 98 runs		Lucknow; 4 wickets	Lucknow; 21 runs	Rajasthan; 7 wickets		
Mumbai Indians	Chennai; 20 runs	Mumbai; 29 runs		Kolkata; 24 runs	Lucknow; 18 runs			Rajasthan; 6 wickets	Mumbai; 7 wickets	Mumbai; 7 wickets
Punjab Kings	Chennai; 28 runs	Punjab; 4 wickets	Gujarat; 3 wickets			Mumbai; 9 runs		Rajasthan; 3 wickets	Bengaluru; 60 runs	Hyderabad; 2 runs
Rajasthan Royals		Rajasthan; 12 runs	Gujarat; 3 wickets	Match abandoned	Rajasthan; 20 runs	Rajasthan; 9 wickets	Punjab; 5 wickets		Rajasthan; 6 wickets	
Royal Challengers Bengaluru	Bengaluru; 27 runs	Bengaluru; 47 runs	Bengaluru; 4 wickets	Kolkata; 7 wickets	Lucknow; 28 runs		Bengaluru; 4 wickets			Hyderabad; 25 runs
Sunrisers Hyderabad	Hyderabad; 6 wickets		Match abandoned		Hyderabad; 10 wickets	Hyderabad; 31 runs	Hyderabad; 4 wickets	Hyderabad; 1 run	Bengaluru; 35 runs	

Home team won	Visitor team won

- Note: Results listed are according to the home (horizontal) and visitor (vertical) teams.
- Note: Click on a result to see a summary of the match.

=== Fixtures ===
Match 1
22 March 2024
20:00 (N)
Scorecard

Royal Challengers Bengaluru; 173/6 (20 overs)	v	Chennai Super Kings (H); 176/4 (18.4 overs)
Anuj Rawat 48 (25); Mustafizur Rahman 4/29 (4 overs)		Rachin Ravindra 37 (15); Cameron Green 2/27 (3 overs)

Chennai Super Kings won by 6 wickets
M. A. Chidambaram Stadium, Chennai
Umpires: Saiyed Khalid (Ind) and Virender Sharma (Ind)
Player of the match: Mustafizur Rahman (Chennai Super Kings)

- Royal Challengers Bengaluru won the toss and elected to bat.

Match 2
23 March 2024
15:30 (D/N)
Scorecard

Delhi Capitals; 174/9 (20 overs)	v	Punjab Kings (H); 177/6 (19.2 overs)
Shai Hope 33 (25); Arshdeep Singh 2/28 (4 overs)		Sam Curran 63 (47); Kuldeep Yadav 2/20 (4 overs)

Punjab Kings won by 4 wickets
Maharaja Yadavindra Singh International Cricket Stadium, Mullanpur
Umpires: Jayaraman Madanagopal (Ind) and Nikhil Patwardhan (Ind)
Player of the match: Sam Curran (Punjab Kings)

- Punjab Kings won the toss and elected to field.
- This was the first IPL match played at this venue.

Match 3
23 March 2024
19:30 (N)
Scorecard

(H) Kolkata Knight Riders; 208/7 (20 overs)	v	Sunrisers Hyderabad; 204/7 (20 overs)
Andre Russell 64* (25); T. Natarajan 3/32 (4 overs)		Heinrich Klaasen 63 (29); Harshit Rana 3/33 (4 overs)

Kolkata Knight Riders won by 4 runs
Eden Gardens, Kolkata
Umpires: Yeshwant Barde (Ind) and Rohan Pandit (Ind)
Player of the match: Andre Russell (Kolkata Knight Riders)

- Sunrisers Hyderabad won the toss and elected to field.

Match 4
24 March 2024
15:30 (D/N)
Scorecard

(H) Rajasthan Royals; 193/4 (20 overs)	v	Lucknow Super Giants; 173/6 (20 overs)
Sanju Samson 82* (52); Naveen-ul-Haq 2/41 (4 overs)		Nicholas Pooran 64* (41); Trent Boult 2/35 (4 overs)

Rajasthan Royals won by 20 runs
Sawai Mansingh Stadium, Jaipur
Umpires: Kumar Dharmasena (SL) and Akshay Totre (Ind)
Player of the match: Sanju Samson (Rajasthan Royals)

- Rajasthan Royals won the toss and elected to bat.

Match 5
24 March 2024
19:30 (N)
Scorecard

(H) Gujarat Titans; 168/6 (20 overs)	v	Mumbai Indians; 162/9 (20 overs)
Sai Sudharsan 45 (39); Jasprit Bumrah 3/14 (4 overs)		Dewald Brevis 46 (38); Spencer Johnson 2/25 (2 overs)

Gujarat Titans won by 6 runs
Narendra Modi Stadium, Ahmedabad
Umpires: Vineet Kulkarni (Ind) and Virender Sharma (Ind)
Player of the match: Sai Sudharsan (Gujarat Titans)

- Mumbai Indians won the toss and elected to field.

Match 6
25 March 2024
19:30 (N)
Scorecard

Punjab Kings; 176/6 (20 overs)	v	Royal Challengers Bengaluru (H); 178/6 (19.2 overs)
Shikhar Dhawan 45 (37); Mohammed Siraj 2/26 (4 overs)		Virat Kohli 77 (49); Harpreet Brar 2/13 (4 overs)

Royal Challengers Bengaluru won by 4 wickets
M. Chinnaswamy Stadium, Bengaluru
Umpires: Anil Chaudhary (Ind) and Saidharshan Kumar (Ind)
Player of the match: Virat Kohli (Royal Challengers Bengaluru)

- Royal Challengers Bengaluru won the toss and elected to field.

Match 7
26 March 2024
19:30 (N)
Scorecard

(H) Chennai Super Kings; 206/6 (20 overs)	v	Gujarat Titans; 143/8 (20 overs)
Shivam Dube 51 (23); Rashid Khan 2/49 (4 overs)		Sai Sudharsan 37 (31); Tushar Deshpande 2/21 (4 overs)

Chennai Super Kings won by 63 runs
M. A. Chidambaram Stadium, Chennai
Umpires: Tapan Sharma (Ind) and Alex Wharf (Eng)
Player of the match: Shivam Dube (Chennai Super Kings)

- Gujarat Titans won the toss and elected to field.

Match 8
27 March 2024
19:30 (N)
Scorecard

(H) Sunrisers Hyderabad; 277/3 (20 overs)	v	Mumbai Indians; 246/5 (20 overs)
Heinrich Klassen 80* (34); Piyush Chawla 1/34 (2 overs)		Tilak Varma 64 (34); Pat Cummins 2/35 (4 overs)

Sunrisers Hyderabad won by 31 runs
Rajiv Gandhi International Cricket Stadium, Hyderabad
Umpires: K. N. Ananthapadmanabhan (Ind) and Ulhas Gandhe (Ind)
Player of the match: Abhishek Sharma (Sunrisers Hyderabad)

- Mumbai Indians won the toss and elected to field.
- Sunrisers Hyderabad broke Royal Challengers Bengaluru's record (263) for the highest innings total in IPL (277).
- Mumbai Indians broke Rajasthan Royals' record (226) for the highest second innings total in IPL (246). This was also the highest total in a losing cause in an IPL match.
- The match broke the record for highest aggregate scored in an IPL match surpassing 469 runs between Chennai Super Kings and Rajasthan Royals in 2010 (523).

Match 9
28 March 2024
19:30 (N)
Scorecard

(H) Rajasthan Royals; 185/5 (20 overs)	v	Delhi Capitals; 173/5 (20 overs)
Riyan Parag 84* (45); Axar Patel 1/21 (4 overs)		David Warner 49 (34); Yuzvendra Chahal 2/19 (3 overs)

Rajasthan Royals won by 12 runs
Sawai Mansingh Stadium, Jaipur
Umpires: Nand Kishore (Ind) and Nitin Menon (Ind)
Player of the match: Riyan Parag (Rajasthan Royals)

- Delhi Capitals won the toss and elected to field.

Match 10
29 March 2024
19:30 (N)
Scorecard

(H) Royal Challengers Bengaluru; 182/6 (20 overs)	v	Kolkata Knight Riders; 186/3 (16.5 overs)
Virat Kohli 83* (59); Andre Russell 2/29 (4 overs)		Venkatesh Iyer 50 (30); Vijaykumar Vyshak 1/23 (4 overs)

Kolkata Knight Riders won by 7 wickets
M. Chinnaswamy Stadium, Bengaluru
Umpires: Anil Chaudhary (Ind) and Rohan Pandit (Ind)
Player of the match: Sunil Narine (Kolkata Knight Riders)

- Kolkata Knight Riders won the toss and elected to field.

Match 11
30 March 2024
19:30 (N)
Scorecard

(H) Lucknow Super Giants; 199/8 (20 overs)	v	Punjab Kings; 178/5 (20 overs)
Quinton de Kock 54 (38); Sam Curran 3/28 (4 overs)		Shikhar Dhawan 70 (50); Mayank Yadav 3/27 (4 overs)

Lucknow Super Giants won by 21 runs
BRSABV Ekana Cricket Stadium, Lucknow
Umpires: Jayaraman Madanagopal (Ind) and Navdeep Singh (Ind)
Player of the match: Mayank Yadav (Lucknow Super Giants)

- Lucknow Super Giants won the toss and elected to bat.

Match 12
31 March 2024
15:30 (D/N)
Scorecard

Sunrisers Hyderabad; 162/8 (20 overs)	v	Gujarat Titans (H); 168/3 (19.1 overs)
Abdul Samad 29 (14); Mohit Sharma 3/25 (4 overs)		Sai Sudharsan 45 (36); Shahbaz Ahmed 1/20 (2 overs)

Gujarat Titans won by 7 wickets
Narendra Modi Stadium, Ahmedabad
Umpires: Saiyed Khalid (Ind) and Virender Sharma (Ind)
Player of the match: Mohit Sharma (Gujarat Titans)

- Sunrisers Hyderabad won the toss and elected to bat.

Match 13
31 March 2024
19:30 (N)
Scorecard

(H) Delhi Capitals; 191/5 (20 overs)	v	Chennai Super Kings; 171/6 (20 overs)
David Warner 52 (35); Matheesha Pathirana 3/31 (4 overs)		Ajinkya Rahane 45 (30); Mukesh Kumar 3/21 (3 overs)

Delhi Capitals won by 20 runs
ACA-VDCA Cricket Stadium, Visakhapatnam
Umpires: Kumar Dharmasena (SL) and Vinod Seshan (Ind)
Player of the match: Khaleel Ahmed (Delhi Capitals)

- Delhi Capitals won the toss and elected to bat.

Match 14
1 April 2024
19:30 (N)
Scorecard

(H) Mumbai Indians; 125/9 (20 overs)	v	Rajasthan Royals; 127/4 (15.3 overs)
Hardik Pandya 34 (21); Yuzvendra Chahal 3/11 (4 overs)		Riyan Parag 54* (39); Akash Madhwal 3/20 (4 overs)

Rajasthan Royals won by 6 wickets
Wankhede Stadium, Mumbai
Umpires: Yeshwant Barde (Ind) and Saidharshan Kumar (Ind)
Player of the match: Trent Boult (Rajasthan Royals)

- Rajasthan Royals won the toss and elected to field.

Match 15
2 April 2024
19:30 (N)
Scorecard

Lucknow Super Giants; 181/5 (20 overs)	v	Royal Challengers Bengaluru (H); 153 (19.4 overs)
Quinton de Kock 81 (56); Glenn Maxwell 2/23 (4 overs)		Mahipal Lomror 33 (13); Mayank Yadav 3/14 (4 overs)

Lucknow Super Giants won by 28 runs
M. Chinnaswamy Stadium, Bengaluru
Umpires: Jayaraman Madanagopal (Ind) and Nikhil Patwardhan (Ind)
Player of the match: Mayank Yadav (Lucknow Super Giants)

- Royal Challengers Bengaluru won the toss and elected to field.

Match 16
3 April 2024
19:30 (N)
Scorecard

Kolkata Knight Riders; 272/7 (20 overs)	v	Delhi Capitals (H); 166 (17.2 overs)
Sunil Narine 85 (39); Anrich Nortje 3/59 (4 overs)		Rishabh Pant 55 (25); Vaibhav Arora 3/27 (4 overs)

Kolkata Knight Riders won by 106 runs
ACA-VDCA Cricket Stadium, Visakhapatnam
Umpires: Ulhas Gandhe (Ind) and Akshay Totre (Ind)
Player of the match: Sunil Narine (Kolkata Knight Riders)

- Kolkata Knight Riders won the toss and elected to bat.

Match 17
4 April 2024
19:30 (N)
Scorecard

(H) Gujarat Titans; 199/4 (20 overs)	v	Punjab Kings; 200/7 (19.5 overs)
Shubman Gill 89* (48); Kagiso Rabada 2/44 (4 overs)		Shashank Singh 61* (29); Noor Ahmad 2/32 (4 overs)

Punjab Kings won by 3 wickets
Narendra Modi Stadium, Ahmedabad
Umpires: Vineet Kulkarni (Ind) and Nitin Menon (Ind)
Player of the match: Shashank Singh (Punjab Kings)

- Punjab Kings won the toss and elected to field.

Match 18
5 April 2024
19:30 (N)
Scorecard

Chennai Super Kings; 165/5 (20 overs)	v	Sunrisers Hyderabad (H); 166/4 (18.1 overs)
Shivam Dube 45 (24); Shahbaz Ahmed 1/11 (1 over)		Aiden Markram 50 (36); Moeen Ali 2/23 (3 overs)

Sunrisers Hyderabad won by 6 wickets
Rajiv Gandhi International Cricket Stadium, Hyderabad
Umpires: Yeshwant Barde (Ind) and Rohan Pandit (Ind)
Player of the match: Abhishek Sharma (Sunrisers Hyderabad)

- Sunrisers Hyderabad won the toss and elected to field.

Match 19
6 April 2024
19:30 (N)
Scorecard

Royal Challengers Bengaluru; 183/3 (20 overs)	v	Rajasthan Royals (H); 189/4 (19.1 overs)
Virat Kohli 113* (72); Yuzvendra Chahal 2/34 (4 overs)		Jos Buttler 100* (58); Reece Topley 2/27 (4 overs)

Rajasthan Royals won by 6 wickets
Sawai Mansingh Stadium, Jaipur
Umpires: Tapan Sharma (Ind) and Alex Wharf (Eng)
Player of the match: Jos Buttler (Rajasthan Royals)

- Rajasthan Royals won the toss and elected to field.

Match 20
7 April 2024
15:30 (D/N)
Scorecard

(H) Mumbai Indians; 234/5 (20 overs)	v	Delhi Capitals; 205/8 (20 overs)
Rohit Sharma 49 (27); Axar Patel 2/35 (4 overs)		Tristan Stubbs 71* (25); Gerald Coetzee 4/34 (4 overs)

Mumbai Indians won by 29 runs
Wankhede Stadium, Mumbai
Umpires: Kumar Dharmasena (SL) and Ulhas Gandhe (Ind)
Player of the match: Romario Shepherd (Mumbai Indians)

- Delhi Capitals won the toss and elected to field.

Match 21
7 April 2024
19:30 (N)
Scorecard

(H) Lucknow Super Giants; 163/5 (20 overs)	v	Gujarat Titans; 130 (18.5 overs)
Marcus Stoinis 58 (43); Darshan Nalkande 2/21 (2 overs)		Sai Sudharsan 31 (23); Yash Thakur 5/30 (3.5 overs)

Lucknow Super Giants won by 33 runs
BRSABV Ekana Cricket Stadium, Lucknow
Umpires: Nand Kishore (Ind) and Virender Sharma (Ind)
Player of the match: Yash Thakur (Lucknow Super Giants)

- Lucknow Super Giants won the toss and elected to bat.

Match 22
8 April 2024
19:30 (N)
Scorecard

Kolkata Knight Riders; 137/9 (20 overs)	v	Chennai Super Kings (H); 141/3 (17.4 overs)
Shreyas Iyer 34 (32); Ravindra Jadeja 3/18 (4 overs)		Ruturaj Gaikwad 67* (58); Vaibhav Arora 2/28 (4 overs)

Chennai Super Kings won by 7 wickets
M. A. Chidambaram Stadium, Chennai
Umpires: Anil Chaudhary (Ind) and Saidharshan Kumar (Ind)
Player of the match: Ravindra Jadeja (Chennai Super Kings)

- Chennai Super Kings won the toss and elected to field.

Match 23
9 April 2024
19:30 (N)
Scorecard

Sunrisers Hyderabad; 182/9 (20 overs)	v	Punjab Kings (H); 180/6 (20 overs)
Nitish Kumar Reddy 64 (37); Arshdeep Singh 4/29 (4 overs)		Shashank Singh 46* (25); Bhuvneshwar Kumar 2/32 (4 overs)

Sunrisers Hyderabad won by 2 runs
Maharaja Yadavindra Singh International Cricket Stadium, Mullanpur
Umpires: Nikhil Patwardhan (Ind) and Navdeep Singh (Ind)
Player of the match: Nitish Kumar Reddy (Sunrisers Hyderabad)

- Punjab Kings won the toss and elected to field.

Match 24
10 April 2024
19:30 (N)
Scorecard

(H) Rajasthan Royals; 196/3 (20 overs)	v	Gujarat Titans; 199/7 (20 overs)
Riyan Parag 76 (48); Rashid Khan 1/18 (4 overs)		Shubman Gill 72 (44); Kuldeep Sen 3/41 (4 overs)

Gujarat Titans won by 3 wickets
Sawai Mansingh Stadium, Jaipur
Umpires: Kumar Dharmasena (SL) and Vinod Seshan (Ind)
Player of the match: Rashid Khan (Gujarat Titans)

- Gujarat Titans won the toss and elected to field.

Match 25
11 April 2024
19:30 (N)
Scorecard

Royal Challengers Bengaluru; 196/8 (20 overs)	v	Mumbai Indians (H); 199/3 (15.3 overs)
Faf du Plessis 61 (40); Jasprit Bumrah 5/21 (4 overs)		Ishan Kishan 69 (34); Will Jacks 1/24 (2 overs)

Mumbai Indians won by 7 wickets
Wankhede Stadium, Mumbai
Umpires: Nitin Menon (Ind) and Vineet Kulkarni (Ind)
Player of the match: Jasprit Bumrah (Mumbai Indians)

- Mumbai Indians won the toss and elected to field.

Match 26
12 April 2024
19:30 (N)
Scorecard

(H) Lucknow Super Giants; 167/7 (20 overs)	v	Delhi Capitals; 170/4 (18.1 overs)
Ayush Badoni 55* (35); Kuldeep Yadav 3/20 (4 overs)		Jake Fraser-McGurk 55 (35); Ravi Bishnoi 2/25 (4 overs)

Delhi Capitals won by 6 wickets
BRSABV Ekana Cricket Stadium, Lucknow
Umpires: Yeshwant Barde (Ind) and Rohan Pandit (Ind)
Player of the match: Kuldeep Yadav (Delhi Capitals)

- Lucknow Super Giants won the toss and elected to bat.

Match 27
13 April 2024
19:30 (N)
Scorecard

(H) Punjab Kings; 147/8 (20 overs)	v	Rajasthan Royals; 152/7 (19.5 overs)
Ashutosh Sharma 31 (16); Keshav Maharaj 2/23 (4 overs)		Yashasvi Jaiswal 39 (28); Kagiso Rabada 2/18 (4 overs)

Rajasthan Royals won by 3 wickets
Maharaja Yadavindra Singh International Cricket Stadium, Mullanpur
Umpires: Anil Chaudhary (Ind) and Tapan Sharma (Ind)
Player of the match: Shimron Hetmyer (Rajasthan Royals)

- Rajasthan Royals won the toss and elected to field.

Match 28
14 April 2024
15:30 (D/N)
Scorecard

Lucknow Super Giants; 161/7 (20 overs)	v	Kolkata Knight Riders (H); 162/2 (15.4 overs)
Nicholas Pooran 45 (32); Mitchell Starc 3/28 (4 overs)		Phil Salt 89* (47); Mohsin Khan 2/29 (4 overs)

Kolkata Knight Riders won by 8 wickets
Eden Gardens, Kolkata
Umpires: Vinod Seshan (Ind) and Akshay Totre (Ind)
Player of the match: Phil Salt (Kolkata Knight Riders)

- Kolkata Knight Riders won the toss and elected to field.

Match 29
14 April 2024
19:30 (N)
Scorecard

Chennai Super Kings; 206/4 (20 overs)	v	Mumbai Indians (H); 186/6 (20 overs)
Ruturaj Gaikwad 69 (40); Hardik Pandya 2/43 (3 overs)		Rohit Sharma 105* (63); Matheesha Pathirana 4/28 (4 overs)

Chennai Super Kings won by 20 runs
Wankhede Stadium, Mumbai
Umpires: Saiyed Khalid (Ind) and Nitin Menon (Ind)
Player of the match: Matheesha Pathirana (Chennai Super Kings)

- Mumbai Indians won the toss and elected to field.

Match 30
15 April 2024
19:30 (N)
Scorecard

Sunrisers Hyderabad; 287/3 (20 overs)	v	Royal Challengers Bengaluru (H); 262/7 (20 overs)
Travis Head 102 (41); Lockie Ferguson 2/52 (4 overs)		Dinesh Karthik 83 (35); Pat Cummins 3/43 (4 overs)

Sunrisers Hyderabad won by 25 runs
M. Chinnaswamy Stadium, Bengaluru
Umpires: Anil Chaudhary (Ind) and Rohan Pandit (Ind)
Player of the match: Travis Head (Sunrisers Hyderabad)

- Royal Challengers Bengaluru won the toss and elected to field.
- Sunrisers Hyderabad broke their own record (277) for the highest innings total in IPL (287).
- Royal Challengers Bengaluru broke Mumbai Indians' record (246) for the highest second innings total in IPL (262), and South Africa's record (259) for the highest second innings total in T20 cricket. This was also the highest total in a losing cause in both IPL matches and T20 matches.
- The match broke the record for highest aggregate scored in an IPL match surpassing 523 runs between Sunrisers Hyderabad and Mumbai Indians in 2024 (549).

Match 31
16 April 2024
19:30 (N)
Scorecard

(H) Kolkata Knight Riders; 223/6 (20 overs)	v	Rajasthan Royals; 224/8 (20 overs)
Sunil Narine 109 (56); Avesh Khan 2/35 (4 overs)		Jos Buttler 107* (60); Sunil Narine 2/30 (4 overs)

Rajasthan Royals won by 2 wickets
Eden Gardens, Kolkata
Umpires: Ulhas Gandhe (Ind) and Michael Gough (Eng)
Player of the match: Jos Buttler (Rajasthan Royals)

- Rajasthan Royals won the toss and elected to field.
- Rajasthan Royals recorded the joint highest successful run chase in IPL history.

Match 32
17 April 2024
19:30 (N)
Scorecard

(H) Gujarat Titans; 89 (17.3 overs)	v	Delhi Capitals; 92/4 (8.5 overs)
Rashid Khan 31 (24); Mukesh Kumar 3/14 (2.3 overs)		Jake Fraser-McGurk 20 (10); Sandeep Warrier 2/40 (3 overs)

Delhi Capitals won by 6 wickets
Narendra Modi Stadium, Ahmedabad
Umpires: Virender Sharma (Ind) and Nikhil Patwardhan (Ind)
Player of the match: Rishabh Pant (Delhi Capitals)

- Delhi Capitals won the toss and elected to field.
- Gujarat Titans recorded their lowest innings total in IPL history.

Match 33
18 April 2024
19:30 (N)
Scorecard

Mumbai Indians; 192/7 (20 overs)	v	Punjab Kings (H); 183 (19.1 overs)
Suryakumar Yadav 78 (53); Harshal Patel 3/31 (4 overs)		Ashutosh Sharma 61 (28); Jasprit Bumrah 3/21 (4 overs)

Mumbai Indians won by 9 runs
Maharaja Yadavindra Singh International Cricket Stadium, Mullanpur
Umpires: Nand Kishore (Ind) and Vineet Kulkarni (Ind)
Player of the match: Jasprit Bumrah (Mumbai Indians)

- Punjab Kings won the toss and elected to field.

Match 34
19 April 2024
19:30 (N)
Scorecard

Chennai Super Kings; 176/6 (20 overs)	v	Lucknow Super Giants (H); 180/2 (19 overs)
Ravindra Jadeja 57* (40); Krunal Pandya 2/16 (3 overs)		KL Rahul 82 (53); Matheesha Pathirana 1/29 (4 overs)

Lucknow Super Giants won by 8 wickets
BRSABV Ekana Cricket Stadium, Lucknow
Umpires: Anil Chaudhary (Ind) and Rohan Pandit (Ind)
Player of the match: KL Rahul (Lucknow Super Giants)

- Lucknow Super Giants won the toss and elected to field.

Match 35
20 April 2024
19:30 (N)
Scorecard

Sunrisers Hyderabad; 266/7 (20 overs)	v	Delhi Capitals (H); 199 (19.1 overs)
Travis Head 89 (32); Kuldeep Yadav 4/55 (4 overs)		Jake Fraser-McGurk 65 (18); T Natarajan 4/19 (4 overs)

Sunrisers Hyderabad won by 67 runs
Arun Jaitley Stadium, Delhi
Umpires: Jayaraman Madanagopal (Ind) and Navdeep Singh (Ind)
Player of the match: Travis Head (Sunrisers Hyderabad)

- Delhi Capitals won the toss and elected to field.

Match 36
21 April 2024
15:30 (D/N)
Scorecard

(H) Kolkata Knight Riders; 222/6 (20 overs)	v	Royal Challengers Bengaluru; 221 (20 overs)
Shreyas Iyer 50 (36); Cameron Green 2/35 (4 overs)		Will Jacks 55 (32); Andre Russell 3/25 (3 overs)

Kolkata Knight Riders won by 1 run
Eden Gardens, Kolkata
Umpires: Vinod Seshan (Ind) and Akshay Totre (Ind)
Player of the match: Andre Russell (Kolkata Knight Riders)

- Royal Challengers Bengaluru won the toss and elected to field.

Match 37
21 April 2024
19:30 (N)
Scorecard

(H) Punjab Kings; 142 (20 overs)	v	Gujarat Titans; 146/7 (19.1 overs)
Prabhsimran Singh 35 (21); R. Sai Kishore 4/33 (4 overs)		Rahul Tewatia 36* (18); Harshal Patel 3/15 (3 overs)

Gujarat Titans won by 3 wickets
Maharaja Yadavindra Singh International Cricket Stadium, Mullanpur
Umpires: Nand Kishore (Ind) and Vineet Kulkarni (Ind)
Player of the match: R. Sai Kishore (Gujarat Titans)

- Punjab Kings won the toss and elected to bat.

Match 38
22 April 2024
19:30 (N)
Scorecard

Mumbai Indians; 179/9 (20 overs)	v	Rajasthan Royals (H); 183/1 (18.4 overs)
Tilak Varma 65 (45); Sandeep Sharma 5/18 (4 overs)		Yashasvi Jaiswal 104* (60); Piyush Chawla 1/33 (4 overs)

Rajasthan Royals won by 9 wickets
Sawai Mansingh Stadium, Jaipur
Umpires: Anil Chaudhary (Ind) and Saidharshan Kumar (Ind)
Player of the match: Sandeep Sharma (Rajasthan Royals)

- Mumbai Indians won the toss and elected to bat.

Match 39
23 April 2024
19:30 (N)
Scorecard

(H) Chennai Super Kings; 210/4 (20 overs)	v	Lucknow Super Giants; 213/4 (19.3 overs)
Ruturaj Gaikwad 108* (60); Matt Henry 1/28 (4 overs)		Marcus Stoinis 124* (63); Matheesha Pathirana 2/35 (4 overs)

Lucknow Super Giants won by 6 wickets
M. A. Chidambaram Stadium, Chennai
Umpires: Nikhil Patwardhan (Ind) and Tapan Sharma (Ind)
Player of the match: Marcus Stoinis (Lucknow Super Giants)

- Lucknow Super Giants won the toss and elected to field.

Match 40
24 April 2024
19:30 (N)
Scorecard

(H) Delhi Capitals; 224/4 (20 overs)	v	Gujarat Titans; 220/8 (20 overs)
Rishabh Pant 88* (43); Sandeep Warrier 3/15 (3 overs)		Sai Sudharsan 65 (39); Rasikh Salam 3/44 (4 overs)

Delhi Capitals won by 4 runs
Arun Jaitley Stadium, Delhi
Umpires: K. N. Ananthapadmanabhan (Ind) and Ulhas Gandhe (Ind)
Player of the match: Rishabh Pant (Delhi Capitals)

- Gujarat Titans won the toss and elected to field.

Match 41
25 April 2024
19:30 (N)
Scorecard

Royal Challengers Bengaluru; 206/7 (20 overs)	v	Sunrisers Hyderabad (H); 171/8 (20 overs)
Virat Kohli 51 (43); Jaydev Unadkat 3/30 (4 overs)		Shahbaz Ahmed 40* (37); Cameron Green 2/12 (2 overs)

Royal Challengers Bengaluru won by 35 runs
Rajiv Gandhi International Cricket Stadium, Hyderabad
Umpires: Nitin Menon (Ind) and Saiyed Khalid (Ind)
Player of the match: Rajat Patidar (Royal Challengers Bengaluru)

- Royal Challengers Bengaluru won the toss and elected to bat.

Match 42
26 April 2024
19:30 (N)
Scorecard

(H) Kolkata Knight Riders; 261/6 (20 overs)	v	Punjab Kings; 262/2 (18.4 overs)
Phil Salt 75 (37); Arshdeep Singh 2/45 (4 overs)		Jonny Bairstow 108* (48); Sunil Narine 1/24 (4 overs)

Punjab Kings won by 8 wickets
Eden Gardens, Kolkata
Umpires: Yeshwant Barde (Ind) and Anil Chaudhary (Ind)
Player of the match: Jonny Bairstow (Punjab Kings)

- Punjab Kings won the toss and elected to field.
- Punjab Kings made the highest successful run-chase in IPL history, thus breaking the record of Rajasthan Royals (223).

Match 43
27 April 2024
15:30 (D/N)
Scorecard

(H) Delhi Capitals; 257/4 (20 overs)	v	Mumbai Indians; 247/9 (20 overs)
Jake Fraser-McGurk 84 (27); Mohammad Nabi 1/20 (2 overs)		Tilak Varma 63 (32); Rasikh Salam 3/34 (4 overs)

Delhi Capitals won by 10 runs
Arun Jaitley Stadium, Delhi
Umpires: Nikhil Patwardhan (Ind) and Navdeep Singh (Ind)
Player of the match: Jake Fraser-McGurk (Delhi Capitals)

- Mumbai Indians won the toss and elected to field.

Match 44
27 April 2024
19:30 (N)
Scorecard

(H) Lucknow Super Giants; 196/5 (20 overs)	v	Rajasthan Royals; 199/3 (19 overs)
KL Rahul 76 (48); Sandeep Sharma 2/31 (4 overs)		Sanju Samson 71* (33); Marcus Stoinis 1/3 (1 over)

Rajasthan Royals won by 7 wickets
BRSABV Ekana Cricket Stadium, Lucknow
Umpires: K. N. Ananthapadmanabhan (Ind) and Michael Gough (Eng)
Player of the match: Sanju Samson (Rajasthan Royals)

- Rajasthan Royals won the toss and elected to field.

Match 45
28 April 2024
15:30 (D/N)
Scorecard

(H) Gujarat Titans; 200/3 (20 overs)	v	Royal Challengers Bengaluru; 206/1 (16 overs)
Sai Sudharsan 84* (49); Swapnil Singh 1/23 (3 overs)		Will Jacks 100* (41); R. Sai Kishore 1/30 (3 overs)

Royal Challengers Bengaluru won by 9 wickets
Narendra Modi Stadium, Ahmedabad
Umpires: Nitin Menon (Ind) and Virender Sharma (Ind)
Player of the match: Will Jacks (Royal Challengers Bengaluru)

- Royal Challengers Bengaluru won the toss and elected to field.

Match 46
28 April 2024
19:30 (N)
Scorecard

(H) Chennai Super Kings; 212/3 (20 overs)	v	Sunrisers Hyderabad; 134 (18.5 overs)
Ruturaj Gaikwad 98 (54); Bhuvneshwar Kumar 1/38 (4 overs); Jaydev Unadkat 1/38 (4 overs)		Aiden Markram 32 (26); Tushar Deshpande 4/27 (3 overs)

Chennai Super Kings won by 78 runs
M. A. Chidambaram Stadium, Chennai
Umpires: Saidharshan Kumar (Ind) and Rohan Pandit (Ind)
Player of the match: Ruturaj Gaikwad (Chennai Super Kings)

- Sunrisers Hyderabad won the toss and elected to field.

Match 47
29 April 2024
19:30 (N)
Scorecard

Delhi Capitals; 153/9 (20 overs)	v	Kolkata Knight Riders (H); 157/3 (16.3 overs)
Kuldeep Yadav 35* (26); Varun Chakravarthy 3/16 (4 overs)		Phil Salt 68 (33); Axar Patel 2/25 (4 overs)

Kolkata Knight Riders won by 7 wickets
Eden Gardens, Kolkata
Umpires: Tapan Sharma (Ind) and Navdeep Singh (Ind)
Player of the match: Varun Chakravarthy (Kolkata Knight Riders)

- Delhi Capitals won the toss and elected to bat.

Match 48
30 April 2024
19:30 (N)
Scorecard

Mumbai Indians; 144/7 (20 overs)	v	Lucknow Super Giants (H); 145/6 (19.2 overs)
Nehal Wadhera 46 (41); Mohsin Khan 2/36 (4 overs)		Marcus Stoinis 62 (45); Hardik Pandya 2/26 (4 overs)

Lucknow Super Giants won by 4 wickets
BRSABV Ekana Cricket Stadium, Lucknow
Umpires: Ulhas Gandhe (Ind) and Michael Gough (Eng)
Player of the match: Marcus Stoinis (Lucknow Super Giants)

- Lucknow Super Giants won the toss and elected to field.

Match 49
1 May 2024
19:30 (N)
Scorecard

(H) Chennai Super Kings; 162/7 (20 overs)	v	Punjab Kings; 163/3 (17.5 overs)
Ruturaj Gaikwad 62 (48); Rahul Chahar 2/16 (4 overs)		Jonny Bairstow 46 (30); Shivam Dube 1/14 (1 over)

Punjab Kings won by 7 wickets
M. A. Chidambaram Stadium, Chennai
Umpires: Saiyed Khalid (Ind) and Virender Sharma (Ind)
Player of the match: Harpreet Brar (Punjab Kings)

- Punjab Kings won the toss and elected to field.

Match 50
2 May 2024
19:30 (N)
Scorecard

(H) Sunrisers Hyderabad; 201/3 (20 overs)	v	Rajasthan Royals; 200/7 (20 overs)
Nitish Kumar Reddy 76* (42); Avesh Khan 2/39 (4 overs)		Riyan Parag 77 (49); Bhuvneshwar Kumar 3/41 (4 overs)

Sunrisers Hyderabad won by 1 run
Rajiv Gandhi International Cricket Stadium, Hyderabad
Umpires: Yeshwant Barde (Ind) and Anil Chaudhary (Ind)
Player of the match: Bhuvneshwar Kumar (Sunrisers Hyderabad)

- Sunrisers Hyderabad won the toss and elected to bat.

Match 51
3 May 2024
19:30 (N)
Scorecard

Kolkata Knight Riders; 169 (19.5 overs)	v	Mumbai Indians (H); 145 (18.5 overs)
Venkatesh Iyer 70 (52); Jasprit Bumrah 3/18 (3.5 overs)		Suryakumar Yadav 56 (35); Mitchell Starc 4/33 (3.5 overs)

Kolkata Knight Riders won by 24 runs
Wankhede Stadium, Mumbai
Umpires: Jayaraman Madanagopal (Ind) and Tapan Sharma (Ind)
Player of the match: Venkatesh Iyer (Kolkata Knight Riders)

- Mumbai Indians won the toss and elected to field.

Match 52
4 May 2024
19:30 (N)
Scorecard

Gujarat Titans; 147 (19.3 overs)	v	Royal Challengers Bengaluru (H); 152/6 (13.4 overs)
Shahrukh Khan 37 (24); Yash Dayal 2/21 (4 overs)		Faf du Plessis 64 (23); Josh Little 4/45 (4 overs)

Royal Challengers Bengaluru won by 4 wickets
M. Chinnaswamy Stadium, Bengaluru
Umpires: Vinod Seshan (Ind) and Akshay Totre (Ind)
Player of the match: Mohammed Siraj (Royal Challengers Bengaluru)

- Royal Challengers Bengaluru won the toss and elected to field.

Match 53
5 May 2024
15:30 (N)
Scorecard

Chennai Super Kings; 167/9 (20 overs)	v	Punjab Kings (H); 139/9 (20 overs)
Ravindra Jadeja 43 (26); Rahul Chahar 3/23 (4 overs)		Prabhsimran Singh 30 (23); Ravindra Jadeja 3/20 (4 overs)

Chennai Super Kings won by 28 runs
HPCA Stadium, Dharamshala
Umpires: Nand Kishore (Ind) and Vineet Kulkarni (Ind)
Player of the match: Ravindra Jadeja (Chennai Super Kings)

- Punjab Kings won the toss and elected to field.

Match 54
5 May 2024
19:30 (N)
Scorecard

Kolkata Knight Riders; 235/6 (20 overs)	v	Lucknow Super Giants (H); 137 (16.1 overs)
Sunil Narine 81 (39); Naveen-ul-Haq 3/49 (4 overs)		Marcus Stoinis 36 (21); Harshit Rana 3/24 (3.1 overs)

Kolkata Knight Riders won by 98 runs
BRSABV Ekana Cricket Stadium, Lucknow
Umpires: Yeshwant Barde (Ind) and Saidharshan Kumar (Ind)
Player of the match: Sunil Narine (Kolkata Knight Riders)

- Lucknow Super Giants won the toss and elected to field.

Match 55
6 May 2024
19:30 (N)
Scorecard

Sunrisers Hyderabad; 173/8 (20 overs)	v	Mumbai Indians (H); 174/3 (17.2 overs)
Travis Head 48 (30); Hardik Pandya 3/31 (4 overs)		Suryakumar Yadav 102* (51); Bhuvneshwar Kumar 1/22 (4 overs)

Mumbai Indians won by 7 wickets
Wankhede Stadium, Mumbai
Umpires: Tapan Sharma (Ind) and Navdeep Singh (Ind)
Player of the match: Suryakumar Yadav (Mumbai Indians)

- Mumbai Indians won the toss and elected to field.

Match 56
7 May 2024
19:30 (N)
Scorecard

(H) Delhi Capitals; 221/8 (20 overs)	v	Rajasthan Royals; 201/8 (20 overs)
Abhishek Porel 65 (36); Ravichandran Ashwin 3/24 (4 overs)		Sanju Samson 86 (46); Kuldeep Yadav 2/25 (4 overs)

Delhi Capitals won by 20 runs
Arun Jaitley Stadium, Delhi
Umpires: K. N. Ananthapadmanabhan (Ind) and Ulhas Gandhe (Ind)
Player of the match: Kuldeep Yadav (Delhi Capitals)

- Rajasthan Royals won the toss and elected to field.

Match 57
8 May 2024
19:30 (N)
Scorecard

Lucknow Super Giants; 165/4 (20 overs)	v	Sunrisers Hyderabad (H); 167/0 (9.4 overs)
Ayush Badoni 55* (30); Bhuvneshwar Kumar 2/12 (4 overs)		Travis Head 89* (30)

Sunrisers Hyderabad won by 10 wickets
Rajiv Gandhi International Cricket Stadium, Hyderabad
Umpires: Yeshwant Barde (Ind) and Saidharshan Kumar (Ind)
Player of the match: Travis Head (Sunrisers Hyderabad)

- Lucknow Super Giants won the toss and elected to bat.
- Mumbai Indians were eliminated from the playoffs as a result of this match.

Match 58
9 May 2024
19:30 (N)
Scorecard

Royal Challengers Bengaluru; 241/7 (20 overs)	v	Punjab Kings (H); 181 (17 overs)
Virat Kohli 92 (47); Harshal Patel 3/38 (4 overs)		Rilee Rossouw 61 (27); Mohammed Siraj 3/43 (4 overs)

Royal Challengers Bengaluru won by 60 runs
HPCA Stadium, Dharamshala
Umpires: Saiyed Khalid (Ind) and Nitin Menon (Ind)
Player of the match: Virat Kohli (Royal Challengers Bengaluru)

- Punjab Kings won the toss and elected to field.
- Punjab Kings were eliminated from the playoffs as a result of this match.

Match 59
10 May 2024
19:30 (N)
Scorecard

(H) Gujarat Titans; 231/3 (20 overs)	v	Chennai Super Kings; 196/8 (20 overs)
Shubman Gill 104 (55); Tushar Deshpande 2/33 (4 overs)		Daryl Mitchell 63 (34); Mohit Sharma 3/31 (4 overs)

Gujarat Titans won by 35 runs
Narendra Modi Stadium, Ahmedabad
Umpires: K. N. Ananthapadmanabhan (Ind) and Nikhil Patwardhan (Ind)
Player of the match: Shubman Gill (Gujarat Titans)

- Chennai Super Kings won the toss and elected to field.

Match 60
11 May 2024
19:30 (N)
Scorecard

(H) Kolkata Knight Riders; 157/7 (16 overs)	v	Mumbai Indians; 139/8 (16 overs)
Venkatesh Iyer 42 (21); Piyush Chawla 2/28 (3 overs)		Ishan Kishan 40 (22); Varun Chakravarthy 2/17 (4 overs)

Kolkata Knight Riders won by 18 runs
Eden Gardens, Kolkata
Umpires: Ulhas Gandhe (Ind) and Vinod Seshan (Ind)
Player of the match: Varun Chakravarthy (Kolkata Knight Riders)

- Mumbai Indians won the toss and elected to field.
- The match was reduced to 16 overs per side due to rain.
- Kolkata Knight Riders qualified for the playoffs as a result of this match.

Match 61
12 May 2024
15:30 (D/N)
Scorecard

Rajasthan Royals; 141/5 (20 overs)	v	Chennai Super Kings (H); 145/5 (18.2 overs)
Riyan Parag 47* (35); Simarjeet Singh 3/26 (4 overs)		Ruturaj Gaikwad 42* (41); Ravichandran Ashwin 2/35 (4 overs)

Chennai Super Kings won by 5 wickets
M. A. Chidambaram Stadium, Chennai
Umpires: Yeshwant Barde (Ind) and Rohan Pandit (Ind)
Player of the match: Simarjeet Singh (Chennai Super Kings)

- Rajasthan Royals won the toss and elected to bat.

Match 62
12 May 2024
19:30 (N)
Scorecard

(H) Royal Challengers Bengaluru; 187/9 (20 overs)	v	Delhi Capitals; 140 (19.1 overs)
Rajat Patidar 52 (32); Rasikh Salam 2/23 (3 overs)		Axar Patel 57 (39); Yash Dayal 3/20 (3.1 overs)

Royal Challengers Bengaluru won by 47 runs
M. Chinnaswamy Stadium, Bengaluru
Umpires: Nand Kishore (Ind) and Vineet Kulkarni (Ind)
Player of the match: Cameron Green (Royal Challengers Bengaluru)

- Delhi Capitals won the toss and elected to field.

Match 63
13 May 2024
19:30 (N)
Scorecard

(H) Gujarat Titans	v	Kolkata Knight Riders

Match abandoned
Narendra Modi Stadium, Ahmedabad
Umpires: Nikhil Patwardhan (Ind) and Navdeep Singh (Ind)

- No toss.
- No play was possible due to rain.
- Kolkata Knight Riders advanced to Qualifier 1 while Gujarat Titans were eliminated from the playoffs as a result of this match.

Match 64
14 May 2024
19:30 (N)
Scorecard

(H) Delhi Capitals; 208/4 (20 overs)	v	Lucknow Super Giants; 189/9 (20 overs)
Abishek Porel 58 (33); Naveen-ul-Haq 2/51 (4 overs)		Nicholas Pooran 61 (27); Ishant Sharma 3/34 (4 overs)

Delhi Capitals won by 19 runs
Arun Jaitley Stadium, Delhi
Umpires: Vinod Seshan (Ind) and Akshay Totre (Ind)
Player of the match: Ishant Sharma (Delhi Capitals)

- Lucknow Super Giants won the toss and elected to field.
- Rajasthan Royals qualified for the playoffs as a result of this match.

Match 65
15 May 2024
19:30 (N)
Scorecard

(H) Rajasthan Royals; 144/9 (20 overs)	v	Punjab Kings; 145/5 (18.5 overs)
Riyan Parag 48 (34); Sam Curran 2/24 (3 overs)		Sam Curran 63* (41); Avesh Khan 2/28 (3.5 overs)

Punjab Kings won by 5 wickets
Assam Cricket Association Stadium, Guwahati
Umpires: Saidharshan Kumar (Ind) and Rohan Pandit (Ind)
Player of the match: Sam Curran (Punjab Kings)

- Rajasthan Royals won the toss and elected to bat.

Match 66
16 May 2024
19:30 (N)
Scorecard

(H) Sunrisers Hyderabad	v	Gujarat Titans

Match abandoned
Rajiv Gandhi International Cricket Stadium, Hyderabad
Umpires: Nand Kishore (Ind) and Virender Sharma (Ind)

- No toss.
- No play was possible due to rain.
- Sunrisers Hyderabad qualified for the playoffs while Delhi Capitals and Lucknow Super Giants were eliminated from the playoffs as a result of this match.

Match 67
17 May 2024
19:30 (N)
Scorecard

Lucknow Super Giants; 214/6 (20 overs)	v	Mumbai Indians (H); 196/6 (20 overs)
Nicholas Pooran 75 (29); Nuwan Thushara 3/28 (4 overs)		Rohit Sharma 68 (38); Ravi Bishnoi 2/37 (4 overs)

Lucknow Super Giants won by 18 runs
Wankhede Stadium, Mumbai
Umpires: Rohan Pandit (Ind) and Navdeep Singh (Ind)
Player of the match: Nicholas Pooran (Lucknow Super Giants)

- Mumbai Indians won the toss and elected to field.

Match 68
18 May 2024
19:30 (N)
Scorecard

(H) Royal Challengers Bengaluru; 218/5 (20 overs)	v	Chennai Super Kings; 191/7 (20 overs)
Faf du Plessis 54 (39); Shardul Thakur 2/61 (4 overs)		Rachin Ravindra 61 (37); Yash Dayal 2/42 (4 overs)

Royal Challengers Bengaluru won by 27 runs
M. Chinnaswamy Stadium, Bengaluru
Umpires: K. N. Ananthapadmanabhan (Ind) and Akshay Totre (Ind)
Player of the match: Faf du Plessis (Royal Challengers Bengaluru)

- Chennai Super Kings won the toss and elected to field.
- Royal Challengers Bengaluru qualified for the playoffs while Chennai Super Kings were eliminated from the playoffs as a result of this match.

Match 69
19 May 2024
15:30 (D/N)
Scorecard

Punjab Kings; 214/5 (20 overs)	v	Sunrisers Hyderabad (H); 215/6 (19.1 overs)
Prabhsimran Singh 71 (45); T Natarajan 2/33 (4 overs)		Abhishek Sharma 66 (28); Arshdeep Singh 2/37 (4 overs)

Sunrisers Hyderabad won by 4 wickets
Rajiv Gandhi International Cricket Stadium, Hyderabad
Umpires: Nitin Menon (Ind) and Virender Sharma (Ind)
Player of the match: Abhishek Sharma (Sunrisers Hyderabad)

- Punjab Kings won the toss and elected to bat.

Match 70
19 May 2024
19:30 (N)
Scorecard

(H) Rajasthan Royals	v	Kolkata Knight Riders

Match abandoned
Assam Cricket Association Stadium, Guwahati
Umpires: Anil Chaudhary (Ind) and Saidharshan Kumar (Ind)

- Kolkata Knight Riders won the toss and elected to field.
- No play was possible due to rain.
- Sunrisers Hyderabad advanced to Qualifier 1 as a result of this match.

== Playoffs ==
=== Bracket ===
Qualifier 1
21 May 2024 – Ahmedabad
1	Kolkata Knight Riders	164/2 (13.4 overs)
2	Sunrisers Hyderabad	159 (19.3 overs)
Eliminator
22 May 2024 – Ahmedabad
3	Rajasthan Royals	174/6 (19 overs)
4	Royal Challengers Bengaluru	172/8 (20 overs)

Qualifier 2
24 May 2024 – Chennai
Q1L	Sunrisers Hyderabad	175/9 (20 overs)
EW	Rajasthan Royals	139/7 (20 overs)

Final
26 May 2024 – Chennai
Q1W	Kolkata Knight Riders	114/2 (10.3 overs)
Q2W	Sunrisers Hyderabad	113 (18.3 overs)

- Sources: ESPNcricinfo

=== Qualifier 1 ===
Qualifier 1
21 May 2024
19:30 (N)
Scorecard

Sunrisers Hyderabad; 159 (19.3 overs)	v	Kolkata Knight Riders; 164/2 (13.4 overs)
Rahul Tripathi 55 (35); Mitchell Starc 3/34 (4 overs)		Shreyas Iyer 58* (24); T Natarajan 1/22 (3 overs)

Kolkata Knight Riders won by 8 wickets
Narendra Modi Stadium, Ahmedabad
Umpires: Anil Chaudhary (Ind) and Rohan Pandit (Ind)
Player of the match: Mitchell Starc (Kolkata Knight Riders)

- Sunrisers Hyderabad won the toss and elected to bat.
- Kolkata Knight Riders qualified for the final for the 4th time in IPL history.

=== Eliminator ===
Eliminator
22 May 2024
19:30 (N)
Scorecard

Royal Challengers Bengaluru; 172/8 (20 overs)	v	Rajasthan Royals; 174/6 (19 overs)
Rajat Patidar 34 (22); Avesh Khan 3/44 (4 overs)		Yashasvi Jaiswal 45 (30); Mohammed Siraj 2/33 (4 overs)

Rajasthan Royals won by 4 wickets
Narendra Modi Stadium, Ahmedabad
Umpires: K. N. Ananthapadmanabhan (Ind) and Saidharshan Kumar (Ind)
Player of the match: Ravichandran Ashwin (Rajasthan Royals)

- Rajasthan Royals won the toss and elected to field.

=== Qualifier 2 ===
Qualifier 2
24 May 2024
19:30 (N)
Scorecard

Sunrisers Hyderabad; 175/9 (20 overs)	v	Rajasthan Royals; 139/7 (20 overs)
Heinrich Klaasen 50 (34); Avesh Khan 3/27 (4 overs)		Dhruv Jurel 56* (35); Shahbaz Ahmed 3/23 (4 overs)

Sunrisers Hyderabad won by 36 runs
M. A. Chidambaram Stadium, Chennai
Umpires: Nitin Menon (Ind) and Virender Sharma (Ind)
Player of the match: Shahbaz Ahmed (Sunrisers Hyderabad)

- Rajasthan Royals won the toss and elected to field.
- Sunrisers Hyderabad qualified for the final for the 3rd time in IPL history.

=== Final ===
Final
26 May 2024
19:30 (N)
Scorecard

Sunrisers Hyderabad; 113 (18.3 overs)	v	Kolkata Knight Riders; 114/2 (10.3 overs)
Pat Cummins 24 (19); Andre Russell 3/19 (2.3 overs)		Venkatesh Iyer 52* (26); Pat Cummins 1/18 (2 overs)

Kolkata Knight Riders won by 8 wickets
M. A. Chidambaram Stadium, Chennai
Umpires: Jayaraman Madanagopal (Ind) and Nitin Menon (Ind)
Player of the match: Mitchell Starc (Kolkata Knight Riders)

- Sunrisers Hyderabad won the toss and elected to bat.
- Kolkata Knight Riders won their third title. They became the first team to win the IPL under different captains (2012 and 2014 under Gautam Gambhir and 2024 under Shreyas Iyer). They also set the record for the fastest IPL final chase with 57 balls remaining, equalling the record for the fewest losses in a single tournament.
- This was the shortest-ever final in the IPL history.

== Statistics and awards ==
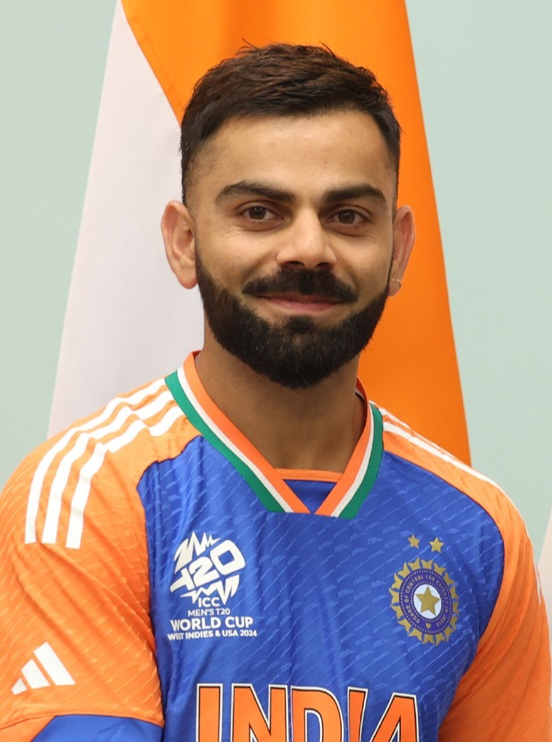
Virat Kohli (pictured in 2024) scored the most runs in the season, and also scored his 8,000th IPL run during the 2024 season.

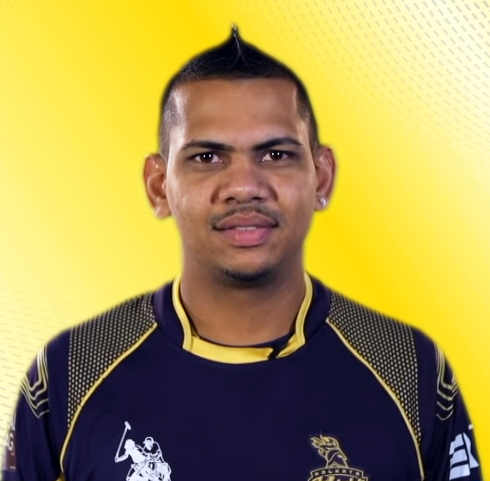
Sunil Narine (pictured in 2014) became the first cricketer to win the Most Valuable Player of the season award for three IPL seasons.

Most runs
Runs	Player	Team
741	Virat Kohli	Royal Challengers Bengaluru
583	Ruturaj Gaikwad	Chennai Super Kings
573	Riyan Parag	Rajasthan Royals
567	Travis Head	Sunrisers Hyderabad
531	Sanju Samson	Rajasthan Royals

Most wickets
Wickets	Player	Team
24	Harshal Patel	Punjab Kings
21	Varun Chakravarthy	Kolkata Knight Riders
20	Jasprit Bumrah	Mumbai Indians
19	T Natarajan	Sunrisers Hyderabad
19	Harshit Rana	Kolkata Knight Riders

Most valuable player
Points	Player	Team
450.0	Sunil Narine	Kolkata Knight Riders
315.5	Virat Kohli	Royal Challengers Bengaluru
274.0	Travis Head	Sunrisers Hyderabad
273.5	Abhishek Sharma	Sunrisers Hyderabad
259.0	Pat Cummins	Sunrisers Hyderabad

=== End of season awards ===
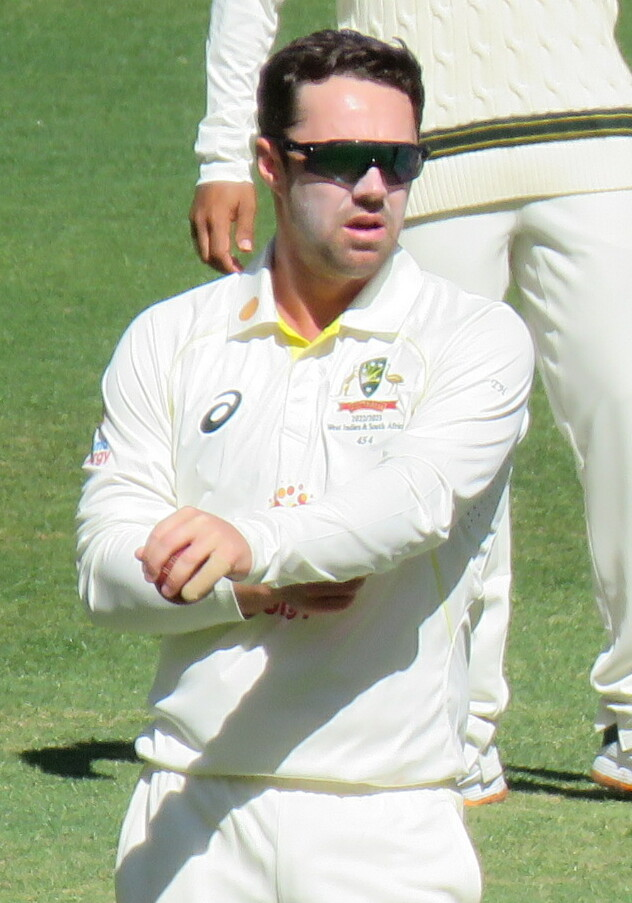
Travis Head (pictured in 2022) scored the most fours in the 2024 season.

End of season awards
Award	Prize	Player	Team
Emerging player of the season	₹10 lakh (US$11,000)	Nitish Kumar Reddy	Sunrisers Hyderabad
Striker of the season	₹10 lakh (US$11,000), trophy and a car	Jake Fraser-McGurk	Delhi Capitals
Fantasy player of the season	₹10 lakh (US$11,000) and trophy	Sunil Narine	Kolkata Knight Riders
Most sixes	₹10 lakh (US$11,000) and trophy	Abhishek Sharma	Sunrisers Hyderabad
Most fours	₹10 lakh (US$11,000) and trophy	Travis Head	Sunrisers Hyderabad
Catch of the season	₹10 lakh (US$11,000) and trophy	Ramandeep Singh	Kolkata Knight Riders
Team fairplay award	₹10 lakh (US$11,000)	—N/a	Sunrisers Hyderabad
Purple Cap (most wickets)	₹10 lakh (US$11,000)	Harshal Patel	Punjab Kings
Orange Cap (most runs)	₹10 lakh (US$11,000)	Virat Kohli	Royal Challengers Bengaluru
Most Valuable Player	₹10 lakh (US$11,000) and trophy	Sunil Narine	Kolkata Knight Riders

== See also ==
- 2024 Women's Premier League (cricket)
- 2024 Women's Premier League (cricket) final
