= 2024 Sunrisers Hyderabad season =

2024 Indian Premier League cricket team

Sunrisers Hyderabad
2024 season
- Coach: Daniel Vettori
- Captain: Pat Cummins
- Ground(s): Rajiv Gandhi International Cricket Stadium, Hyderabad
- IPL League: Qualified for Playoffs (Qualifier 1)
- IPL Qualifier 1: Advanced to Qualifier 2
- IPL Qualifier 2: Advanced to the Final
- IPL Final: Runners-up (2nd)
- Most runs: Travis Head (567)
- Most wickets: T. Natarajan (19)
- Most catches: Abdul Samad (9)
- Most wicket-keeping dismissals: Heinrich Klaasen (10)

The 2024 season was the 12th season for the Indian Premier League franchise Sunrisers Hyderabad. They were one of the ten teams competed in the 2024 Indian Premier League. They finished at the last place in previous season's League stage. The Sunrisers drew an average home attendance of 37,396 in the 2024 edition.

Ahead of the 2024 season, Pat Cummins was appointed as the captain following a poor 2023 season led by Aiden Markram. After their abandoned match on 16 May 2024, Hyderabad qualified for the Playoffs. They finished the League stage at the 2nd place with 8 wins and 5 losses, garnering 17 points and seeding their place in the Qualifier 1.

After being defeated by Kolkata Knight Riders in the Qualifier 1 played on 21 May at Ahmedabad, Hyderabad advanced to the Qualifier 2. After defeating Rajasthan Royals in the Qualifier 2 played on 24 May at Chennai, Hyderabad advanced to the 2024 final for the 3rd time. After being defeated by Kolkata Knight Riders in the final played on 26 May at Chennai, Hyderabad finished as the runners-up for the 2nd time after 2018.

Nitish Kumar Reddy was named as the "Emerging player of the season" and was awarded with ₹10 lakh (US$13,000) cash prize. Abhishek Sharma hit most sixes in the season (42) while Travis Head hit most fours in the season (64) and both were awarded with ₹10 lakh (US$13,000) cash prize and a trophy to each. Sunrisers Hyderabad won the "Team fairplay award" of ₹10 lakh (US$13,000) cash prize.

== Squad ==
- Source: ESPNcricinfo
- Players with international caps are listed in **bold**.
- * denotes a player who was unavailable for rest of the season.

Sunrisers Hyderabad squad for the 2024 Indian Premier League
No.	Name	Nat	Birth date	Batting style	Bowling style	Signed year	Salary	Notes
Captain
30	**Pat Cummins**	(Australia)	8 March 1993 (aged 31)	Right-handed	Right arm fast	2024	₹20.5 crore (US$2.1 million)	Overseas
Batters
16	**Mayank Agarwal**	(India)	16 February 1991 (aged 33)	Right-handed	Right-arm off break	2023	₹8.25 crore (US$860,000)	
52	**Rahul Tripathi**	(India)	2 March 1991 (aged 33)	Right-handed	Right-arm medium	2022	₹8.5 crore (US$880,000)	
62	**Travis Head**	(Australia)	29 December 1993 (aged 30)	Left-handed	Right-arm off break	2024	₹6.8 crore (US$710,000)	Overseas
94	**Aiden Markram**	(South Africa)	4 October 1994 (aged 29)	Right-handed	Right-arm off break	2022	₹2.6 crore (US$270,000)	Overseas
1	Abdul Samad	(India)	28 October 2001 (aged 22)	Right-handed	Right-arm leg break	2020	₹4 crore (US$420,000)	
63	Anmolpreet Singh	(India)	28 March 1998 (aged 25)	Right-handed	Right-arm off-break	2023	₹20 lakh (US$21,000)	
Wicket-keepers
45	**Heinrich Klaasen**	(South Africa)	30 July 1991 (aged 32)	Right-handed	Right-arm off spin	2023	₹5.25 crore (US$550,000)	Overseas
—N/a	Upendra Yadav	(India)	8 October 1996 (aged 27)	Right-handed	Right-arm off spin	2023	₹25 lakh (US$26,000)	
All-rounders
7	Sanvir Singh	(India)	12 October 1996 (aged 27)	Right-handed	Right-arm medium	2023	₹20 lakh (US$21,000)	
47	**Shahbaz Ahmed**	(India)	11 November 1996 (aged 27)	Left-handed	Left-arm orthodox	2024	₹2.4 crore (US$250,000)	Traded (Note: Ahead of the 2024 auction, Shahbaz Ahmed was traded from Royal Challengers Bangalore to Hyderabad.)
6	**Glenn Phillips**	(New Zealand)	6 December 1996 (aged 27)	Right-handed	Right-arm off break	2022	₹1.5 crore (US$160,000)	Overseas
49	**Wanindu Hasaranga**	(Sri Lanka)	29 July 1997 (aged 26)	Right-handed	Right-arm leg break	2023	₹1.5 crore (US$160,000)	Overseas; Withdrawn (Note: Vijayakanth Viyaskanth replaced Wanindu Hasaranga, after the latter withdrew due to Injury.)
5	**Washington Sundar**	(India)	5 October 1999 (aged 24)	Left-handed	Right-arm off break	2022	₹8.75 crore (US$910,000)	
70	**Marco Jansen**	(South Africa)	1 May 2000 (aged 23)	Right-handed	Left-arm fast	2022	₹4.2 crore (US$440,000)	Overseas
4	Abhishek Sharma	(India)	4 September 2000 (aged 23)	Left-handed	Left-arm orthodox	2019	₹6.5 crore (US$670,000)	
8	Nitish Kumar Reddy	(India)	26 May 2003 (aged 20)	Right-handed	Right-arm medium-fast	2023	₹20 lakh (US$21,000)	
Pace bowlers
15	**Bhuvneshwar Kumar**	(India)	5 February 1990 (aged 34)	Right-handed	Right arm medium-fast	2014	₹4.2 crore (US$440,000)	Vice-captain
44	**T. Natarajan**	(India)	4 April 1991 (aged 32)	Left-handed	Left arm medium-fast	2018	₹4 crore (US$420,000)	
91	**Jaydev Unadkat**	(India)	18 October 1991 (aged 32)	Right-handed	Left-arm medium-fast	2024	₹1.6 crore (US$170,000)	
24	**Umran Malik**	(India)	22 November 1999 (aged 24)	Right-handed	Right arm fast	2021	₹4 crore (US$420,000)	
83	**Fazalhaq Farooqi**	(Afghanistan)	22 September 2000 (aged 23)	Right-handed	Left-arm medium-fast	2022	₹50 lakh (US$52,000)	Overseas
23	Akash Singh	(India)	26 April 2002 (aged 21)	Right-handed	Left-arm medium-fast	2024	₹20 lakh (US$21,000)	
Spin bowlers
3	**Mayank Markande**	(India)	11 November 1997 (aged 26)	Right-handed	Right-arm leg break	2023	₹50 lakh (US$52,000)	
—N/a	Jhathavedh Subramanyan	(India)	16 September 1999 (aged 24)	Right-handed	Right arm leg spin	2023	₹20 lakh (US$21,000)	
55	**Vijayakanth Viyaskanth**	(Sri Lanka)	5 December 2001 (aged 22)	Right-handed	Right arm leg spin	2024	₹50 lakh (US$52,000)	Overseas; Replacement

== Administration and support staff ==
Position	Name
CEO	Kavya Maran
Team manager	Vijay Kumar
Head coach	Daniel Vettori
Batting coach	Hemang Badani
Bowling coach	Muttiah Muralitharan
Fielding coach	Ryan Cook

== Sponsors ==
- Kit manufacturer: Wrogn
- Main shirt sponsor: Dream 11
- Back shirt sponsor: BKT
- Chest branding: Kent RO

== League stage ==
=== Points table ===
Pos	Grp	Team	Pld	W	L	NR	Pts	NRR	Qualification
1	A	Kolkata Knight Riders (C)	14	9	3	2	20	1.428	Advanced to Qualifier 1
2	B	Sunrisers Hyderabad (R)	14	8	5	1	17	0.414	Advanced to Qualifier 1
3	A	Rajasthan Royals (3rd)	14	8	5	1	17	0.273	Advanced to Eliminator
4	B	Royal Challengers Bengaluru (4th)	14	7	7	0	14	0.459	Advanced to Eliminator
5	B	Chennai Super Kings	14	7	7	0	14	0.392	Eliminated
6	A	Delhi Capitals	14	7	7	0	14	−0.377	Eliminated
7	A	Lucknow Super Giants	14	7	7	0	14	−0.667	Eliminated
8	B	Gujarat Titans	14	5	7	2	12	−1.063	Eliminated
9	B	Punjab Kings	14	5	9	0	10	−0.353	Eliminated
10	A	Mumbai Indians	14	4	10	0	8	−0.318	Eliminated

Source: ESPNcricinfo
(C) Champions; (R) Runners-up

=== League progression ===
League progression
Team	Group matches														Playoffs		
Team	1	2	3	4	5	6	7	8	9	10	11	12	13	14	Q1/E	Q2	F
Sunrisers Hyderabad	0	2	2	4	6	8	10	10	10	12	12	14	15	17	L	W	L

Win	Loss	No result

- Note: The total points at the end of each group match are listed.
- Note: Click on the points (group matches) or W/L (playoffs) to see the match summary.

=== Fixtures and results ===
Match 3
23 March 2024
19:30 (N)
Scorecard

(H) Kolkata Knight Riders; 208/7 (20 overs)	v	Sunrisers Hyderabad; 204/7 (20 overs)
Andre Russell 64* (25); T. Natarajan 3/32 (4 overs)		Heinrich Klaasen 63 (29); Harshit Rana 3/33 (4 overs)

Kolkata Knight Riders won by 4 runs
Eden Gardens, Kolkata
Umpires: Yeshwant Barde (Ind) and Rohan Pandit (Ind)
Player of the match: Andre Russell (Kolkata Knight Riders)

- Sunrisers Hyderabad won the toss and elected to field.

Match 8
27 March 2024
19:30 (N)
Scorecard

(H) Sunrisers Hyderabad; 277/3 (20 overs)	v	Mumbai Indians; 246/5 (20 overs)
Heinrich Klassen 80* (34); Piyush Chawla 1/34 (2 overs)		Tilak Varma 64 (34); Pat Cummins 2/35 (4 overs)

Sunrisers Hyderabad won by 31 runs
Rajiv Gandhi International Cricket Stadium, Hyderabad
Umpires: K. N. Ananthapadmanabhan (Ind) and Ulhas Gandhe (Ind)
Player of the match: Abhishek Sharma (Sunrisers Hyderabad)

- Mumbai Indians won the toss and elected to field.
- Sunrisers Hyderabad broke Royal Challengers Bengaluru's record (263) for the highest innings total in IPL (277).
- Mumbai Indians broke Rajasthan Royals' record (226) for the highest second innings total in IPL (246). This was also the highest total in a losing cause in an IPL match.
- The match broke the record for highest aggregate scored in an IPL match surpassing 469 runs between Chennai Super Kings and Rajasthan Royals in 2010 (523).

Match 12
31 March 2024
15:30 (D/N)
Scorecard

Sunrisers Hyderabad; 162/8 (20 overs)	v	Gujarat Titans (H); 168/3 (19.1 overs)
Abdul Samad 29 (14); Mohit Sharma 3/25 (4 overs)		Sai Sudharsan 45 (36); Shahbaz Ahmed 1/20 (2 overs)

Gujarat Titans won by 7 wickets
Narendra Modi Stadium, Ahmedabad
Umpires: Saiyed Khalid (Ind) and Virender Sharma (Ind)
Player of the match: Mohit Sharma (Gujarat Titans)

- Sunrisers Hyderabad won the toss and elected to bat.

Match 18
5 April 2024
19:30 (N)
Scorecard

Chennai Super Kings; 165/5 (20 overs)	v	Sunrisers Hyderabad (H); 166/4 (18.1 overs)
Shivam Dube 45 (24); Shahbaz Ahmed 1/11 (1 over)		Aiden Markram 50 (36); Moeen Ali 2/23 (3 overs)

Sunrisers Hyderabad won by 6 wickets
Rajiv Gandhi International Cricket Stadium, Hyderabad
Umpires: Yeshwant Barde (Ind) and Rohan Pandit (Ind)
Player of the match: Abhishek Sharma (Sunrisers Hyderabad)

- Sunrisers Hyderabad won the toss and elected to field.

Match 23
9 April 2024
19:30 (N)
Scorecard

Sunrisers Hyderabad; 182/9 (20 overs)	v	Punjab Kings (H); 180/6 (20 overs)
Nitish Kumar Reddy 64 (37); Arshdeep Singh 4/29 (4 overs)		Shashank Singh 46* (25); Bhuvneshwar Kumar 2/32 (4 overs)

Sunrisers Hyderabad won by 2 runs
Maharaja Yadavindra Singh International Cricket Stadium, Mullanpur
Umpires: Nikhil Patwardhan (Ind) and Navdeep Singh (Ind)
Player of the match: Nitish Kumar Reddy (Sunrisers Hyderabad)

- Punjab Kings won the toss and elected to field.

Match 30
15 April 2024
19:30 (N)
Scorecard

Sunrisers Hyderabad; 287/3 (20 overs)	v	Royal Challengers Bengaluru (H); 262/7 (20 overs)
Travis Head 102 (41); Lockie Ferguson 2/52 (4 overs)		Dinesh Karthik 83 (35); Pat Cummins 3/43 (4 overs)

Sunrisers Hyderabad won by 25 runs
M. Chinnaswamy Stadium, Bengaluru
Umpires: Anil Chaudhary (Ind) and Rohan Pandit (Ind)
Player of the match: Travis Head (Sunrisers Hyderabad)

- Royal Challengers Bengaluru won the toss and elected to field.
- Sunrisers Hyderabad broke their own record (277) for the highest innings total in IPL (287).
- Royal Challengers Bengaluru broke Mumbai Indians' record (246) for the highest second innings total in IPL (262), and South Africa's record (259) for the highest second innings total in T20 cricket. This was also the highest total in a losing cause in both IPL matches and T20 matches.
- The match broke the record for highest aggregate scored in an IPL match surpassing 523 runs between Sunrisers Hyderabad and Mumbai Indians in 2024 (549).

Match 35
20 April 2024
19:30 (N)
Scorecard

Sunrisers Hyderabad; 266/7 (20 overs)	v	Delhi Capitals (H); 199 (19.1 overs)
Travis Head 89 (32); Kuldeep Yadav 4/55 (4 overs)		Jake Fraser-McGurk 65 (18); T Natarajan 4/19 (4 overs)

Sunrisers Hyderabad won by 67 runs
Arun Jaitley Stadium, Delhi
Umpires: Jayaraman Madanagopal (Ind) and Navdeep Singh (Ind)
Player of the match: Travis Head (Sunrisers Hyderabad)

- Delhi Capitals won the toss and elected to field.

Match 41
25 April 2024
19:30 (N)
Scorecard

Royal Challengers Bengaluru; 206/7 (20 overs)	v	Sunrisers Hyderabad (H); 171/8 (20 overs)
Virat Kohli 51 (43); Jaydev Unadkat 3/30 (4 overs)		Shahbaz Ahmed 40* (37); Cameron Green 2/12 (2 overs)

Royal Challengers Bengaluru won by 35 runs
Rajiv Gandhi International Cricket Stadium, Hyderabad
Umpires: Nitin Menon (Ind) and Saiyed Khalid (Ind)
Player of the match: Rajat Patidar (Royal Challengers Bengaluru)

- Royal Challengers Bengaluru won the toss and elected to bat.

Match 46
28 April 2024
19:30 (N)
Scorecard

(H) Chennai Super Kings; 212/3 (20 overs)	v	Sunrisers Hyderabad; 134 (18.5 overs)
Ruturaj Gaikwad 98 (54); Bhuvneshwar Kumar 1/38 (4 overs); Jaydev Unadkat 1/38 (4 overs)		Aiden Markram 32 (26); Tushar Deshpande 4/27 (3 overs)

Chennai Super Kings won by 78 runs
M. A. Chidambaram Stadium, Chennai
Umpires: Saidharshan Kumar (Ind) and Rohan Pandit (Ind)
Player of the match: Ruturaj Gaikwad (Chennai Super Kings)

- Sunrisers Hyderabad won the toss and elected to field.

Match 50
2 May 2024
19:30 (N)
Scorecard

(H) Sunrisers Hyderabad; 201/3 (20 overs)	v	Rajasthan Royals; 200/7 (20 overs)
Nitish Kumar Reddy 76* (42); Avesh Khan 2/39 (4 overs)		Riyan Parag 77 (49); Bhuvneshwar Kumar 3/41 (4 overs)

Sunrisers Hyderabad won by 1 run
Rajiv Gandhi International Cricket Stadium, Hyderabad
Umpires: Yeshwant Barde (Ind) and Anil Chaudhary (Ind)
Player of the match: Bhuvneshwar Kumar (Sunrisers Hyderabad)

- Sunrisers Hyderabad won the toss and elected to bat.

Match 55
6 May 2024
19:30 (N)
Scorecard

Sunrisers Hyderabad; 173/8 (20 overs)	v	Mumbai Indians (H); 174/3 (17.2 overs)
Travis Head 48 (30); Hardik Pandya 3/31 (4 overs)		Suryakumar Yadav 102* (51); Bhuvneshwar Kumar 1/22 (4 overs)

Mumbai Indians won by 7 wickets
Wankhede Stadium, Mumbai
Umpires: Tapan Sharma (Ind) and Navdeep Singh (Ind)
Player of the match: Suryakumar Yadav (Mumbai Indians)

- Mumbai Indians won the toss and elected to field.

Match 57
8 May 2024
19:30 (N)
Scorecard

Lucknow Super Giants; 165/4 (20 overs)	v	Sunrisers Hyderabad (H); 167/0 (9.4 overs)
Ayush Badoni 55* (30); Bhuvneshwar Kumar 2/12 (4 overs)		Travis Head 89* (30)

Sunrisers Hyderabad won by 10 wickets
Rajiv Gandhi International Cricket Stadium, Hyderabad
Umpires: Yeshwant Barde (Ind) and Saidharshan Kumar (Ind)
Player of the match: Travis Head (Sunrisers Hyderabad)

- Lucknow Super Giants won the toss and elected to bat.
- Mumbai Indians were eliminated from the playoffs as a result of this match.

Match 66
16 May 2024
19:30 (N)
Scorecard

(H) Sunrisers Hyderabad	v	Gujarat Titans

Match abandoned
Rajiv Gandhi International Cricket Stadium, Hyderabad
Umpires: Nand Kishore (Ind) and Virender Sharma (Ind)

- No toss.
- No play was possible due to rain.
- Sunrisers Hyderabad qualified for the playoffs while Delhi Capitals and Lucknow Super Giants were eliminated from the playoffs as a result of this match.

Match 69
19 May 2024
15:30 (D/N)
Scorecard

Punjab Kings; 214/5 (20 overs)	v	Sunrisers Hyderabad (H); 215/6 (19.1 overs)
Prabhsimran Singh 71 (45); T Natarajan 2/33 (4 overs)		Abhishek Sharma 66 (28); Arshdeep Singh 2/37 (4 overs)

Sunrisers Hyderabad won by 4 wickets
Rajiv Gandhi International Cricket Stadium, Hyderabad
Umpires: Nitin Menon (Ind) and Virender Sharma (Ind)
Player of the match: Abhishek Sharma (Sunrisers Hyderabad)

- Punjab Kings won the toss and elected to bat.

== Playoffs ==
=== Bracket ===
Qualifier 1
21 May 2024 – Ahmedabad
1	Kolkata Knight Riders	164/2 (13.4 overs)
2	Sunrisers Hyderabad	159 (19.3 overs)
Eliminator
22 May 2024 – Ahmedabad
3	Rajasthan Royals	174/6 (19 overs)
4	Royal Challengers Bengaluru	172/8 (20 overs)

Qualifier 2
24 May 2024 – Chennai
Q1L	Sunrisers Hyderabad	175/9 (20 overs)
EW	Rajasthan Royals	139/7 (20 overs)

Final
26 May 2024 – Chennai
Q1W	Kolkata Knight Riders	114/2 (10.3 overs)
Q2W	Sunrisers Hyderabad	113 (18.3 overs)

- Sources: ESPNcricinfo

=== Qualifier 1 ===
Qualifier 1
21 May 2024
19:30 (N)
Scorecard

Sunrisers Hyderabad; 159 (19.3 overs)	v	Kolkata Knight Riders; 164/2 (13.4 overs)
Rahul Tripathi 55 (35); Mitchell Starc 3/34 (4 overs)		Shreyas Iyer 58* (24); T Natarajan 1/22 (3 overs)

Kolkata Knight Riders won by 8 wickets
Narendra Modi Stadium, Ahmedabad
Umpires: Anil Chaudhary (Ind) and Rohan Pandit (Ind)
Player of the match: Mitchell Starc (Kolkata Knight Riders)

- Sunrisers Hyderabad won the toss and elected to bat.
- Kolkata Knight Riders qualified for the final for the 4th time in IPL history.

=== Qualifier 2 ===
Qualifier 2
24 May 2024
19:30 (N)
Scorecard

Sunrisers Hyderabad; 175/9 (20 overs)	v	Rajasthan Royals; 139/7 (20 overs)
Heinrich Klaasen 50 (34); Avesh Khan 3/27 (4 overs)		Dhruv Jurel 56* (35); Shahbaz Ahmed 3/23 (4 overs)

Sunrisers Hyderabad won by 36 runs
M. A. Chidambaram Stadium, Chennai
Umpires: Nitin Menon (Ind) and Virender Sharma (Ind)
Player of the match: Shahbaz Ahmed (Sunrisers Hyderabad)

- Rajasthan Royals won the toss and elected to field.
- Sunrisers Hyderabad qualified for the final for the 3rd time in IPL history.

=== Final ===
Final
26 May 2024
19:30 (N)
Scorecard

Sunrisers Hyderabad; 113 (18.3 overs)	v	Kolkata Knight Riders; 114/2 (10.3 overs)
Pat Cummins 24 (19); Andre Russell 3/19 (2.3 overs)		Venkatesh Iyer 52* (26); Pat Cummins 1/18 (2 overs)

Kolkata Knight Riders won by 8 wickets
M. A. Chidambaram Stadium, Chennai
Umpires: Jayaraman Madanagopal (Ind) and Nitin Menon (Ind)
Player of the match: Mitchell Starc (Kolkata Knight Riders)

- Sunrisers Hyderabad won the toss and elected to bat.
- Kolkata Knight Riders won their third title. They became the first team to win the IPL under different captains (2012 and 2014 under Gautam Gambhir and 2024 under Shreyas Iyer). They also set the record for the fastest IPL final chase with 57 balls remaining, equalling the record for the fewest losses in a single tournament.
- This was the shortest-ever final in the IPL history.

== Statistics ==
=== Most runs ===
Runs	Player	Inns	HS	Ave	SR	100s/50s	4s	6s
567	(Australia) Travis Head	15	102	40.50	191.55	1/4	64	32
484	(India) Abhishek Sharma	16	75*	32.26	204.21	0/3	36	42
479	(South Africa) Heinrich Klaasen	15	80*	39.91	171.07	0/4	19	38
303	(India) Nitish Kumar Reddy	11	76*	33.66	142.92	0/2	15	21
220	(South Africa) Aiden Markram	11	50	24.44	124.29	0/1	18	4
Source: ESPNcricinfo

=== Most wickets ===
Wkts.	Player	Inns	Ov	Runs	BBI	Ave	Econ	SR	4W	5W
19	(India) T Natarajan	14	51.2	465	4/19	24.47	9.05	16.21	1	0
18	(Australia) Pat Cummins	16	61.0	566	3/43	31.44	9.27	20.33	0	0
11	(India) Bhuvneshwar Kumar	16	57.0	533	3/41	48.45	9.35	31.09	0	0
8	(India) Mayank Markande	7	22.0	259	2/26	32.37	11.77	16.50	0	0
8	(India) Jaydev Unadkat	11	31.1	319	3/30	39.87	10.23	23.37	0	0
Source: ESPNcricinfo
