= 2024 Kolkata Knight Riders season =

2024 Indian Premier League cricket team

Kolkata Knight Riders
2024 season
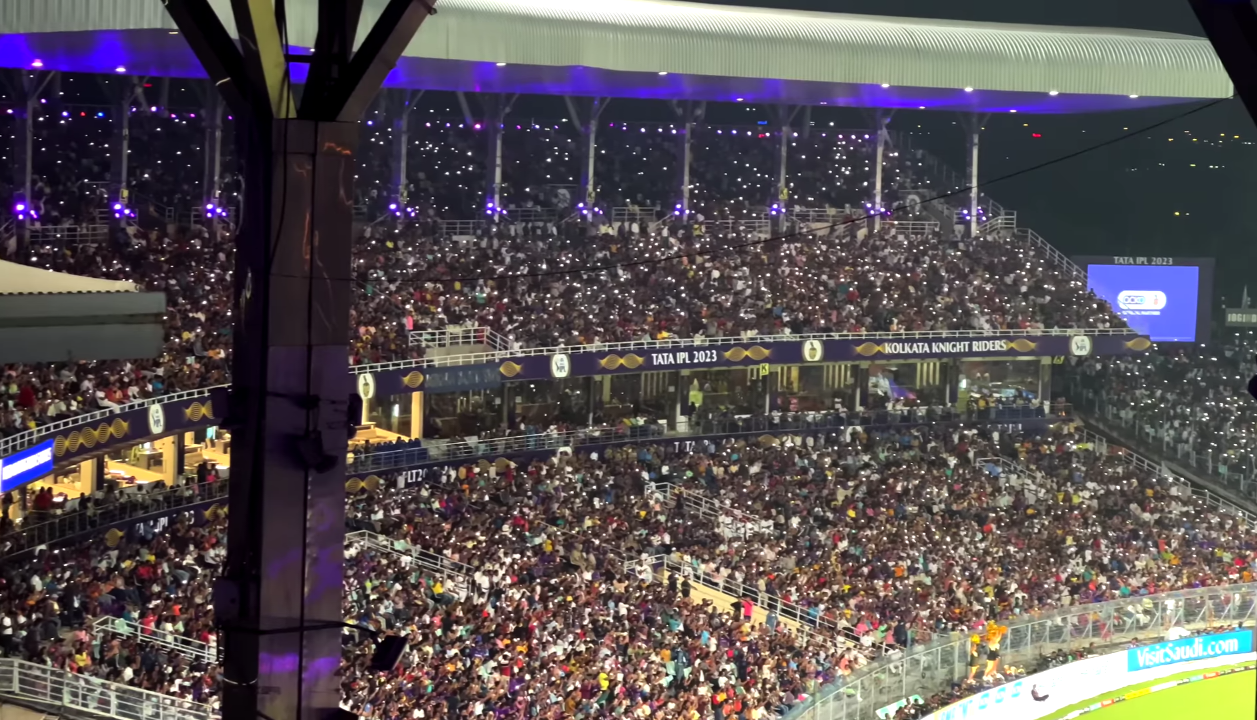
- Coach: Chandrakant Pandit
- Captain: Shreyas Iyer
- Ground(s): Eden Gardens, Kolkata
- IPL League: Qualified for Playoffs (Qualifier 1)
- IPL Qualifier 1: Advanced to the Final
- IPL Final: Champions (3rd title)
- Most runs: Sunil Narine (488)
- Most wickets: Varun Chakravarthy (21)
- Most catches: Shreyas Iyer (10)
- Most wicket-keeping dismissals: Phil Salt (12)

The 2024 season was the 17th season for the Indian Premier League franchise Kolkata Knight Riders. They were one of the ten teams competed in the 2024 Indian Premier League. The Kolkata Knight Riders finished at the 7th place in previous season's League stage. The Kolkata Knight Riders drew an average home attendance of 64,872 in the IPL in 2024.

Ahead of the 2024 season, Shreyas Iyer returned as the captain after missing out the 2023 season due to back injury. After their 9th win on 11 May 2024, Kolkata became the first team to be qualified for the Playoffs. After their abandoned match on 13 May 2024, Kolkata qualified for the Qualifier 1. They finished the League stage at the 1st place with 9 wins and 3 losses, garnering 20 points and seeding their place in the Qualifier 1.

After defeating Sunrisers Hyderabad in the Qualifier 1 played on 21 May at Ahmedabad, Kolkata became the first team to advance to the 2024 final for the 4th time. After defeating Sunrisers Hyderabad in the final played on 26 May at Chennai, Kolkata won their 3rd IPL title after 2012 and 2014.

Sunil Narine was named as the "Ultimate Fantasy player of the season" and was awarded with ₹10 lakh (US$13,000) cash prize along with a trophy. Ramandeep Singh was named as the "Catch of the season" and was awarded with ₹10 lakh (US$13,000) cash prize along with a trophy. Sunil Narine was also the "Most Valuable Player of the season" (450 points) and was awarded with ₹10 lakh (US$13,000) cash prize along with a trophy.

== Squad ==
- Players with international caps are listed in **bold**.
- Ages are given as of 22 March 2024, the date of the first match played in the competition

Squad for the 2024 Indian Premier League
No.	Name	Nationality	Birth date	Batting style	Bowling style	Year signed	Salary	Notes
Captain
96	**Shreyas Iyer**	India	6 December 1994 (aged 29)	Right-handed	Right-arm leg break	2022	₹12.5 crore (US$1.3 million)	
Batters
9	**Manish Pandey**	India	10 September 1989 (aged 34)	Right-handed	Right arm-medium	2024	₹50 lakh (US$52,000)	
20	**Jason Roy**	England	21 July 1990 (aged 33)	Right-handed	Right arm-medium	2023	₹2.8 crore (US$290,000)	Overseas; Withdrew (Note: Phil Salt replaced Jason Roy, after the latter withdrew due to Personal reasons.)
27	**Nitish Rana**	India	27 December 1993 (aged 30)	Left-handed	Right-arm off break	2018	₹8 crore (US$830,000)	Vice-captain
35	**Rinku Singh**	India	12 October 1997 (aged 26)	Left-handed	Right-arm off break	2018	₹55 lakh (US$57,000)	
18	Angkrish Raghuvanshi	India	5 June 2005 (aged 18)	Right-handed	Slow left-arm orthodox spin	2024	₹20 lakh (US$21,000)	
Wicket-keepers
28	**Phil Salt**	England	28 August 1996 (aged 27)	Right-handed	Right arm off spin	2024	₹1.5 crore (US$160,000)	Overseas; Replacement; Withdrew (Note: Phil Salt withdrew due to the upcoming T20WC.)
–	**K. S. Bharat**	India	3 October 1993 (aged 30)	Right-handed	Right-arm off spin	2024	₹50 lakh (US$52,000)	
21	**Rahmanullah Gurbaz**	Afghanistan	28 November 2001 (aged 22)	Right-handed	Right-arm medium fast	2023	₹50 lakh (US$52,000)	Overseas
All-rounders
12	**Andre Russell**	West Indies	29 April 1988 (aged 35)	Right-handed	Right-arm fast-medium	2014	₹12 crore (US$1.2 million)	Overseas
74	**Sunil Narine**	West Indies	26 May 1988 (aged 35)	Left-handed	Right-arm off break	2012	₹6 crore (US$620,000)	Overseas
25	**Venkatesh Iyer**	India	25 December 1994 (aged 29)	Left-handed	Right-arm medium	2021	₹8 crore (US$830,000)	
19	Ramandeep Singh	India	13 April 1997 (aged 26)	Right-handed	Right-arm medium	2024	₹20 lakh (US$21,000)	
50	**Sherfane Rutherford**	West Indies	15 August 1998 (aged 25)	Left-handed	Right-arm fast-medium	2024	₹1.5 crore (US$160,000)	Overseas
6	Anukul Roy	India	30 November 1998 (aged 25)	Left-handed	Slow left-arm orthodox spin	2022	₹20 lakh (US$21,000)	
Pace bowlers
56	**Mitchell Starc**	Australia	30 January 1990 (aged 34)	Left-handed	Left-arm fast	2024	₹24.75 crore (US$2.6 million)	Overseas
14	Vaibhav Arora	India	14 December 1997 (aged 26)	Right-handed	Right-arm fast medium	2023	₹60 lakh (US$62,000)	
–	**Gus Atkinson**	England	19 January 1998 (aged 26)	Right-handed	Right-arm fast	2024	₹1 crore (US$100,000)	Overseas; Withdrew (Note: Dushmantha Chameera replaced Gus Atkinson, after the latter withdrew due to Workload management.)
79	**Dushmantha Chameera**	Sri Lanka	11 January 1992 (aged 32)	Right-handed	Right arm fast	2024	₹50 lakh (US$52,000)	Overseas; Replacement
55	**Chetan Sakariya**	India	25 February 1998 (aged 26)	Left-handed	Left-arm fast medium	2024	₹50 lakh (US$52,000)	
22	Harshit Rana	India	22 December 2001 (aged 22)	Right-handed	Right-arm fast medium	2022	₹20 lakh (US$21,000)	
45	Sakib Hussain	India	14 December 2004 (aged 19)	Right-handed	Right-arm fast medium	2024	₹20 lakh (US$21,000)	
Spin bowlers
–	**Mujeeb Ur Rahman**	Afghanistan	28 March 2001 (aged 22)	Right-handed	Right-arm off break	2024	₹2 crore (US$210,000)	Overseas; Withdrew (Note: Allah Ghazanfar replaced Mujeeb Ur Rahman, after the latter withdrew due to Injury.)
05	Suyash Sharma	India	15 May 2003 (aged 20)	Right-handed	Right-arm leg break	2023	₹20 lakh (US$21,000)	
70	**Allah Ghazanfar**	Afghanistan	15 July 2007 (aged 16)	Right-handed	Right-arm off break	2024	₹20 lakh (US$21,000)	Overseas; Replacement
29	**Varun Chakravarthy**	India	29 August 1991 (aged 32)	Right-handed	Right-arm leg break	2020	₹8 crore (US$830,000)	

- Source: ESPNcricinfo

== Administration and support staff ==
Position	Name
CEO	Venky Mysore
Team manager	Wayne Bentley
Head coach	Chandrakant Pandit
Batting coach	Abhishek Nayar
Bowling coach	Bharat Arun
Fielding coach	Ryan ten Doeschate
Mentor	Gautam Gambhir

== Sponsors ==
- Kit manufacturer: playR
- Main shirt sponsor: Dream11
- Back shirt sponsor: BKT
- Chest branding: Lux Cozi

== League stage ==
=== Points table ===
Pos	Grp	Team	Pld	W	L	NR	Pts	NRR	Qualification
1	A	Kolkata Knight Riders (C)	14	9	3	2	20	1.428	Advanced to Qualifier 1
2	B	Sunrisers Hyderabad (R)	14	8	5	1	17	0.414	Advanced to Qualifier 1
3	A	Rajasthan Royals (3rd)	14	8	5	1	17	0.273	Advanced to Eliminator
4	B	Royal Challengers Bengaluru (4th)	14	7	7	0	14	0.459	Advanced to Eliminator
5	B	Chennai Super Kings	14	7	7	0	14	0.392	Eliminated
6	A	Delhi Capitals	14	7	7	0	14	−0.377	Eliminated
7	A	Lucknow Super Giants	14	7	7	0	14	−0.667	Eliminated
8	B	Gujarat Titans	14	5	7	2	12	−1.063	Eliminated
9	B	Punjab Kings	14	5	9	0	10	−0.353	Eliminated
10	A	Mumbai Indians	14	4	10	0	8	−0.318	Eliminated

Source: ESPNcricinfo
(C) Champions; (R) Runners-up

=== League progression ===
League progression
Team	Group matches														Playoffs		
Team	1	2	3	4	5	6	7	8	9	10	11	12	13	14	Q1/E	Q2	F
Kolkata Knight Riders	2	4	6	6	8	8	10	10	12	14	16	18	19	20	W		W

Win	Loss	No result

- Note: The total points at the end of each group match are listed.
- Note: Click on the points (group matches) or W/L (playoffs) to see the match summary.

=== Fixtures and results ===
Match 3
23 March 2024
19:30 (N)
Scorecard

(H) Kolkata Knight Riders; 208/7 (20 overs)	v	Sunrisers Hyderabad; 204/7 (20 overs)
Andre Russell 64* (25); T. Natarajan 3/32 (4 overs)		Heinrich Klaasen 63 (29); Harshit Rana 3/33 (4 overs)

Kolkata Knight Riders won by 4 runs
Eden Gardens, Kolkata
Umpires: Yeshwant Barde (Ind) and Rohan Pandit (Ind)
Player of the match: Andre Russell (Kolkata Knight Riders)

- Sunrisers Hyderabad won the toss and elected to field.

Match 10
29 March 2024
19:30 (N)
Scorecard

(H) Royal Challengers Bengaluru; 182/6 (20 overs)	v	Kolkata Knight Riders; 186/3 (16.5 overs)
Virat Kohli 83* (59); Andre Russell 2/29 (4 overs)		Venkatesh Iyer 50 (30); Vijaykumar Vyshak 1/23 (4 overs)

Kolkata Knight Riders won by 7 wickets
M. Chinnaswamy Stadium, Bengaluru
Umpires: Anil Chaudhary (Ind) and Rohan Pandit (Ind)
Player of the match: Sunil Narine (Kolkata Knight Riders)

- Kolkata Knight Riders won the toss and elected to field.

Match 16
3 April 2024
19:30 (N)
Scorecard

Kolkata Knight Riders; 272/7 (20 overs)	v	Delhi Capitals (H); 166 (17.2 overs)
Sunil Narine 85 (39); Anrich Nortje 3/59 (4 overs)		Rishabh Pant 55 (25); Vaibhav Arora 3/27 (4 overs)

Kolkata Knight Riders won by 106 runs
ACA-VDCA Cricket Stadium, Visakhapatnam
Umpires: Ulhas Gandhe (Ind) and Akshay Totre (Ind)
Player of the match: Sunil Narine (Kolkata Knight Riders)

- Kolkata Knight Riders won the toss and elected to bat.

Match 22
8 April 2024
19:30 (N)
Scorecard

Kolkata Knight Riders; 137/9 (20 overs)	v	Chennai Super Kings (H); 141/3 (17.4 overs)
Shreyas Iyer 34 (32); Ravindra Jadeja 3/18 (4 overs)		Ruturaj Gaikwad 67* (58); Vaibhav Arora 2/28 (4 overs)

Chennai Super Kings won by 7 wickets
M. A. Chidambaram Stadium, Chennai
Umpires: Anil Chaudhary (Ind) and Saidharshan Kumar (Ind)
Player of the match: Ravindra Jadeja (Chennai Super Kings)

- Chennai Super Kings won the toss and elected to field.

Match 28
14 April 2024
15:30 (D/N)
Scorecard

Lucknow Super Giants; 161/7 (20 overs)	v	Kolkata Knight Riders (H); 162/2 (15.4 overs)
Nicholas Pooran 45 (32); Mitchell Starc 3/28 (4 overs)		Phil Salt 89* (47); Mohsin Khan 2/29 (4 overs)

Kolkata Knight Riders won by 8 wickets
Eden Gardens, Kolkata
Umpires: Vinod Seshan (Ind) and Akshay Totre (Ind)
Player of the match: Phil Salt (Kolkata Knight Riders)

- Kolkata Knight Riders won the toss and elected to field.

Match 31
16 April 2024
19:30 (N)
Scorecard

(H) Kolkata Knight Riders; 223/6 (20 overs)	v	Rajasthan Royals; 224/8 (20 overs)
Sunil Narine 109 (56); Avesh Khan 2/35 (4 overs)		Jos Buttler 107* (60); Sunil Narine 2/30 (4 overs)

Rajasthan Royals won by 2 wickets
Eden Gardens, Kolkata
Umpires: Ulhas Gandhe (Ind) and Michael Gough (Eng)
Player of the match: Jos Buttler (Rajasthan Royals)

- Rajasthan Royals won the toss and elected to field.
- Rajasthan Royals recorded the joint highest successful run chase in IPL history.

Match 36
21 April 2024
15:30 (D/N)
Scorecard

(H) Kolkata Knight Riders; 222/6 (20 overs)	v	Royal Challengers Bengaluru; 221 (20 overs)
Shreyas Iyer 50 (36); Cameron Green 2/35 (4 overs)		Will Jacks 55 (32); Andre Russell 3/25 (3 overs)

Kolkata Knight Riders won by 1 run
Eden Gardens, Kolkata
Umpires: Vinod Seshan (Ind) and Akshay Totre (Ind)
Player of the match: Andre Russell (Kolkata Knight Riders)

- Royal Challengers Bengaluru won the toss and elected to field.

Match 42
26 April 2024
19:30 (N)
Scorecard

(H) Kolkata Knight Riders; 261/6 (20 overs)	v	Punjab Kings; 262/2 (18.4 overs)
Phil Salt 75 (37); Arshdeep Singh 2/45 (4 overs)		Jonny Bairstow 108* (48); Sunil Narine 1/24 (4 overs)

Punjab Kings won by 8 wickets
Eden Gardens, Kolkata
Umpires: Yeshwant Barde (Ind) and Anil Chaudhary (Ind)
Player of the match: Jonny Bairstow (Punjab Kings)

- Punjab Kings won the toss and elected to field.
- Punjab Kings made the highest successful run-chase in IPL history, thus breaking the record of Rajasthan Royals (223).

Match 47
29 April 2024
19:30 (N)
Scorecard

Delhi Capitals; 153/9 (20 overs)	v	Kolkata Knight Riders (H); 157/3 (16.3 overs)
Kuldeep Yadav 35* (26); Varun Chakravarthy 3/16 (4 overs)		Phil Salt 68 (33); Axar Patel 2/25 (4 overs)

Kolkata Knight Riders won by 7 wickets
Eden Gardens, Kolkata
Umpires: Tapan Sharma (Ind) and Navdeep Singh (Ind)
Player of the match: Varun Chakravarthy (Kolkata Knight Riders)

- Delhi Capitals won the toss and elected to bat.

Match 51
3 May 2024
19:30 (N)
Scorecard

Kolkata Knight Riders; 169 (19.5 overs)	v	Mumbai Indians (H); 145 (18.5 overs)
Venkatesh Iyer 70 (52); Jasprit Bumrah 3/18 (3.5 overs)		Suryakumar Yadav 56 (35); Mitchell Starc 4/33 (3.5 overs)

Kolkata Knight Riders won by 24 runs
Wankhede Stadium, Mumbai
Umpires: Jayaraman Madanagopal (Ind) and Tapan Sharma (Ind)
Player of the match: Venkatesh Iyer (Kolkata Knight Riders)

- Mumbai Indians won the toss and elected to field.

Match 54
5 May 2024
19:30 (N)
Scorecard

Kolkata Knight Riders; 235/6 (20 overs)	v	Lucknow Super Giants (H); 137 (16.1 overs)
Sunil Narine 81 (39); Naveen-ul-Haq 3/49 (4 overs)		Marcus Stoinis 36 (21); Harshit Rana 3/24 (3.1 overs)

Kolkata Knight Riders won by 98 runs
BRSABV Ekana Cricket Stadium, Lucknow
Umpires: Yeshwant Barde (Ind) and Saidharshan Kumar (Ind)
Player of the match: Sunil Narine (Kolkata Knight Riders)

- Lucknow Super Giants won the toss and elected to field.

Match 60
11 May 2024
19:30 (N)
Scorecard

(H) Kolkata Knight Riders; 157/7 (16 overs)	v	Mumbai Indians; 139/8 (16 overs)
Venkatesh Iyer 42 (21); Piyush Chawla 2/28 (3 overs)		Ishan Kishan 40 (22); Varun Chakravarthy 2/17 (4 overs)

Kolkata Knight Riders won by 18 runs
Eden Gardens, Kolkata
Umpires: Ulhas Gandhe (Ind) and Vinod Seshan (Ind)
Player of the match: Varun Chakravarthy (Kolkata Knight Riders)

- Mumbai Indians won the toss and elected to field.
- The match was reduced to 16 overs per side due to rain.
- Kolkata Knight Riders qualified for the playoffs as a result of this match.

Match 63
13 May 2024
19:30 (N)
Scorecard

(H) Gujarat Titans	v	Kolkata Knight Riders

Match abandoned
Narendra Modi Stadium, Ahmedabad
Umpires: Nikhil Patwardhan (Ind) and Navdeep Singh (Ind)

- No toss.
- No play was possible due to rain.
- Kolkata Knight Riders advanced to Qualifier 1 while Gujarat Titans were eliminated from the playoffs as a result of this match.

Match 70
19 May 2024
19:30 (N)
Scorecard

(H) Rajasthan Royals	v	Kolkata Knight Riders

Match abandoned
Assam Cricket Association Stadium, Guwahati
Umpires: Anil Chaudhary (Ind) and Saidharshan Kumar (Ind)

- Kolkata Knight Riders won the toss and elected to field.
- No play was possible due to rain.
- Sunrisers Hyderabad advanced to Qualifier 1 as a result of this match.

== Playoffs ==
=== Bracket ===
Qualifier 1
21 May 2024 – Ahmedabad
1	Kolkata Knight Riders	164/2 (13.4 overs)
2	Sunrisers Hyderabad	159 (19.3 overs)
Eliminator
22 May 2024 – Ahmedabad
3	Rajasthan Royals	174/6 (19 overs)
4	Royal Challengers Bengaluru	172/8 (20 overs)

Qualifier 2
24 May 2024 – Chennai
Q1L	Sunrisers Hyderabad	175/9 (20 overs)
EW	Rajasthan Royals	139/7 (20 overs)

Final
26 May 2024 – Chennai
Q1W	Kolkata Knight Riders	114/2 (10.3 overs)
Q2W	Sunrisers Hyderabad	113 (18.3 overs)

- Sources: ESPNcricinfo

=== Qualifier 1 ===
Qualifier 1
21 May 2024
19:30 (N)
Scorecard

Sunrisers Hyderabad; 159 (19.3 overs)	v	Kolkata Knight Riders; 164/2 (13.4 overs)
Rahul Tripathi 55 (35); Mitchell Starc 3/34 (4 overs)		Shreyas Iyer 58* (24); T Natarajan 1/22 (3 overs)

Kolkata Knight Riders won by 8 wickets
Narendra Modi Stadium, Ahmedabad
Umpires: Anil Chaudhary (Ind) and Rohan Pandit (Ind)
Player of the match: Mitchell Starc (Kolkata Knight Riders)

- Sunrisers Hyderabad won the toss and elected to bat.
- Kolkata Knight Riders qualified for the final for the 4th time in IPL history.

=== Final ===
Final
26 May 2024
19:30 (N)
Scorecard

Sunrisers Hyderabad; 113 (18.3 overs)	v	Kolkata Knight Riders; 114/2 (10.3 overs)
Pat Cummins 24 (19); Andre Russell 3/19 (2.3 overs)		Venkatesh Iyer 52* (26); Pat Cummins 1/18 (2 overs)

Kolkata Knight Riders won by 8 wickets
M. A. Chidambaram Stadium, Chennai
Umpires: Jayaraman Madanagopal (Ind) and Nitin Menon (Ind)
Player of the match: Mitchell Starc (Kolkata Knight Riders)

- Sunrisers Hyderabad won the toss and elected to bat.
- Kolkata Knight Riders won their third title. They became the first team to win the IPL under different captains (2012 and 2014 under Gautam Gambhir and 2024 under Shreyas Iyer). They also set the record for the fastest IPL final chase with 57 balls remaining, equalling the record for the fewest losses in a single tournament.
- This was the shortest-ever final in the IPL history.

== Statistics ==
=== Most runs ===
Runs	Player	Innings	Highest score
488	Sunil Narine	14	109
435	Phil Salt	12	89*
370	Venkatesh Iyer	13	70
351	Shreyas Iyer	14	58*
222	Andre Russell	9	64*

- Source: ESPNcricinfo

=== Most wickets ===
Wickets	Player	Matches	Best bowling
21	Varun Chakravarthy	14	3/16
19	Harshit Rana	11	3/24
19	Andre Russell	13	3/25
17	Sunil Narine	14	2/22
17	Mitchell Starc	13	4/33

- Source: ESPNcricinfo
