= Australian cricket team in India in 2023–24 =

International cricket tour

	India	Australia
- Dates: 22 September 2023 – 3 December 2023
Captains	K. L. Rahul (Note: Rohit Sharma captained India in the third ODI.)(ODIs); Suryakumar Yadav (T20Is)	Pat Cummins (Note: Steve Smith captained Australia in the second ODI.)(ODIs); Matthew Wade (T20Is)

One Day International series
- Results: India won the 3-match series 2–1
Most runs	Shubman Gill (178)	David Warner (161)
Most wickets	Mohammed Shami (6)	Glenn Maxwell (4)
- Player of the series: Shubman Gill (Ind)

Twenty20 International series
- Results: India won the 5-match series 4–1
Most runs	Ruturaj Gaikwad (223)	Matthew Wade (128)
Most wickets	Ravi Bishnoi (9)	Jason Behrendorff (6)
- Player of the series: Ravi Bishnoi (Ind)

The Australia men's cricket team toured India in September, November and December 2023 to play three One Day International (ODI) and five Twenty20 International (T20I) matches. The ODI series formed part for the preparation of both teams for 2023 Cricket World Cup tournament. The T20I series formed part of both teams' preparation for the 2024 ICC Men's T20 World Cup tournament. The T20I series took place four days after the 2023 Cricket World Cup final.

== Squads ==
India		Australia	
ODIs	T20Is	ODIs	T20Is
KL Rahul (c, wk); Ravindra Jadeja (vc); Ravichandran Ashwin; Jasprit Bumrah; Ruturaj Gaikwad; Shubman Gill; Shreyas Iyer; Ishan Kishan (wk); Virat Kohli; Prasidh Krishna; Mukesh Kumar; Hardik Pandya; Axar Patel; Mohammed Shami; Rohit Sharma; Mohammed Siraj; Washington Sundar; Shardul Thakur; Tilak Varma; Kuldeep Yadav; Suryakumar Yadav	Suryakumar Yadav (c); Ruturaj Gaikwad (vc); Shreyas Iyer (vc); Ravi Bishnoi; Deepak Chahar; Shivam Dube; Yashasvi Jaiswal; Avesh Khan; Ishan Kishan (wk); Prasidh Krishna; Mukesh Kumar; Axar Patel; Jitesh Sharma (wk); Arshdeep Singh; Rinku Singh; Washington Sundar; Tilak Varma	Pat Cummins (c); Sean Abbott; Alex Carey (wk); Nathan Ellis; Cameron Green; Josh Hazlewood; Josh Inglis (wk); Spencer Johnson; Marnus Labuschagne; Mitchell Marsh; Glenn Maxwell; Tanveer Sangha; Matthew Short; Steve Smith; Mitchell Starc; Marcus Stoinis; David Warner; Adam Zampa	Matthew Wade (c, wk); Sean Abbott; Jason Behrendorff; Tim David; Ben Dwarshuis; Nathan Ellis; Aaron Hardie; Chris Green; Travis Head; Josh Inglis (wk); ~~Spencer Johnson~~; Glenn Maxwell; Ben McDermott (wk); Josh Philippe (wk); Kane Richardson; Tanveer Sangha; Matthew Short; Steve Smith; Marcus Stoinis; ~~David Warner~~; Adam Zampa

Rohit Sharma and Hardik Pandya were named as India's captain and vice-captain, respectively, for the third ODI of the series. Mukesh Kumar was added to the squad for the second ODI as a replacement for Jasprit Bumrah.

Suryakumar Yadav captained the Indian side for the T20I series in place of Rohit Sharma as the latter had taken a break due to the heavy schedule of the World Cup. He became the 13th captain for India in Men's T20Is. This series was Yadav's first assignment as the captain of the Indian T20I team, although here he was the captain for a temporary period.

Shreyas Iyer was selected in the India's squad as vice-captain, only for the last two T20Is.

On 21 November 2023, Aaron Hardie and Kane Richardson replaced rested David Warner and injured Spencer Johnson in the Australia's T20I squad respectively.

For the last two T20Is, Sean Abbott, Josh Inglis, Glenn Maxwell, Steve Smith, Marcus Stoinis and Adam Zampa were released from the Australia's squad, while Ben Dwarshuis, Chris Green, Ben McDermott and Josh Philippe were added to Australia's squad.

On 28 November 2023, Deepak Chahar was added to India's squad for the last two T20Is.

== ODI series ==
=== 1st ODI ===
22 September 2023
13:30 (D/N)
Scorecard

Australia; 276 (50 overs)	v	India; 281/5 (48.4 overs)
David Warner 52 (53); Mohammed Shami 5/51 (10 overs)		Shubman Gill 74 (63); Adam Zampa 2/57 (10 overs)

India won by 5 wickets
I. S. Bindra Stadium, Mohali
Umpires: KN Ananthapadmanabhan (Ind) and Kumar Dharmasena (SL)
Player of the match: Mohammed Shami (Ind)

- India won the toss and elected to field.
- Matthew Short (Aus) made his ODI debut.
- Mohammed Shami became the first ever Indian bowler & fast bowler to take a five-wicket haul against Australia in India.

=== 2nd ODI ===
24 September 2023
13:30 (D/N)
Scorecard

India; 399/5 (50 overs)	v	Australia; 217 (28.2 overs)
Shreyas Iyer 105 (90); Cameron Green 2/103 (10 overs)		Sean Abbott 54 (36); Ravichandran Ashwin 3/41 (7 overs)

India won by 99 runs (DLS method)
Holkar Stadium, Indore
Umpires: Kumar Dharmasena (SL) and Jayaraman Madanagopal (Ind)
Player of the match: Shreyas Iyer (Ind)

- Australia won the toss and elected to field.
- Australia were set a revised target of 317 runs in 33 overs due to rain.
- Spencer Johnson (Aus) made his ODI debut.
- This was India's highest ever ODI score against Australia.

=== 3rd ODI ===
27 September 2023
13:30 (D/N)
Scorecard

Australia; 352/7 (50 overs)	v	India; 286 (49.4 overs)
Mitchell Marsh 96 (84); Jasprit Bumrah 3/81 (10 overs)		Rohit Sharma 81 (57); Glenn Maxwell 4/40 (10 overs)

Australia won by 66 runs
Niranjan Shah Stadium, Rajkot
Umpires: Anil Chaudhary (Ind) and Kumar Dharmasena (SL)
Player of the match: Glenn Maxwell (Aus)

- Australia won the toss and elected to bat.
- Steve Smith (Aus) scored his 5,000th run in ODIs.

== T20I series ==
=== 1st T20I ===
23 November 2023
19:00 (N)
Scorecard

Australia; 208/3 (20 overs)	v	India; 209/8 (19.5 overs)
Josh Inglis 110 (50); Prasidh Krishna 1/50 (4 overs)		Suryakumar Yadav 80 (42); Tanveer Sangha 2/47 (4 overs)

India won by 2 wickets
ACA–VDCA Cricket Stadium, Vishakhapatnam
Umpires: Nitin Menon (Ind) and Rohan Pandit (Ind)
Player of the match: Suryakumar Yadav (Ind)

- India won the toss and elected to field.
- Suryakumar Yadav captained India for the first time in T20Is.
- Josh Inglis (Aus) scored his first century in T20Is, and the equal fastest by an Australian (off 47 balls).
- This was India's joint–highest successful run chase in T20Is.

=== 2nd T20I ===
26 November 2023
19:00 (N)
Scorecard

India; 235/4 (20 overs)	v	Australia; 191/9 (20 overs)
Ruturaj Gaikwad 58 (43); Nathan Ellis 3/45 (4 overs)		Marcus Stoinis 45 (25); Ravi Bishnoi 3/32 (4 overs)

India won by 44 runs
Greenfield International Stadium, Thiruvananthapuram
Umpires: KN Ananthapadmanabhan (Ind) and Jayaraman Madanagopal (Ind)
Player of the match: Yashasvi Jaiswal (Ind)

- Australia won the toss and elected to field.

=== 3rd T20I ===
28 November 2023
19:00 (N)
Scorecard

India; 222/3 (20 overs)	v	Australia; 225/5 (20 overs)
Ruturaj Gaikwad 123* (57); Jason Behrendorff 1/12 (4 overs)		Glenn Maxwell 104* (48); Ravi Bishnoi 2/32 (4 overs)

Australia won by 5 wickets
Assam Cricket Association Stadium, Guwahati
Umpires: Rohan Pandit (Ind) and Virender Sharma (Ind)
Player of the match: Glenn Maxwell (Aus)

- Australia won the toss and elected to field.
- Glenn Maxwell (Aus) played in his 100th T20I.
- Ruturaj Gaikwad (Ind) scored his first century in T20Is, and became the first Indian to score a century against Australia in T20Is.

=== 4th T20I ===
1 December 2023
19:00 (N)
Scorecard

India; 174/9 (20 overs)	v	Australia; 154/7 (20 overs)
Rinku Singh 46 (29); Ben Dwarshuis 3/40 (4 overs)		Matthew Wade 36* (23); Axar Patel 3/16 (4 overs)

India won by 20 runs
Shaheed Veer Narayan Singh International Cricket Stadium, Raipur
Umpires: KN Ananthapadmanabhan (Ind) and Jayaraman Madanagopal (Ind)
Player of the match: Axar Patel (Ind)

- Australia won the toss and elected to field.
- Chris Green (Aus) made his T20I debut.
- This was the first T20I to be played at the venue.

=== 5th T20I ===
3 December 2023
19:00 (N)
Scorecard

India; 160/8 (20 overs)	v	Australia; 154/8 (20 overs)
Shreyas Iyer 53 (37); Ben Dwarshuis 2/30 (4 overs)		Ben McDermott 54 (36); Mukesh Kumar 3/32 (4 overs)

India won by 6 runs
M. Chinnaswamy Stadium, Bengaluru
Umpires: KN Ananthapadmanabhan (Ind) and Rohan Pandit (Ind)
Player of the match: Axar Patel (Ind)

- Australia won the toss and elected to field.
