= 2024 Indian Premier League final =

Twenty20 cricket match

2024 Indian Premier League Final
- Match programme cover
- Event: 2024 Indian Premier League
Sunrisers Hyderabad	Kolkata Knight Riders
113	114/2
18.3 overs	10.3 overs
- Kolkata Knight Riders won by 8 wickets
- Date: 26 May 2024
- Venue: M. A. Chidambaram Stadium, Chennai
- Player of the match: Mitchell Starc (KKR)
- Umpires: Jayaraman Madanagopal (Ind); Nitin Menon (Ind)
- Attendance: 38,000

The 2024 Indian Premier League Final was played on 26 May 2024 at the M. A. Chidambaram Stadium in Chennai. Kolkata Knight Riders qualified for the finals after their win in Qualifier 1. They competed with Sunrisers Hyderabad, who qualified for the finals after their win in Qualifier 2.

After winning the toss, Sunrisers Hyderabad elected to bat but only managed to score 113 runs in 18.3 overs. The Kolkata Knight Riders easily chased the target in 10.3 overs and won the match by eight wickets, thus winning their third IPL title. KKR player Mitchell Starc was named as the player of the match for taking 2 wickets and 2 catches. Sunil Narine (KKR) was named as the player of the season for scoring 488 runs and taking 17 wickets throughout the tournament.

== Background ==
A part of the schedule of the season's fixtures was announced on 22 February 2024 which included the schedule for the first 17 days, consisting of 21 matches. The remaining fixtures were announced on 25 March 2024. It was announced that both Qualifier 1 and Eliminator would be played at the Narendra Modi Stadium, Ahmedabad from 21 to 22 May, and that Qualifier 2 and final would be played in Chennai, with the venue hosting its third IPL final after 2011 and 2012. Kolkata Knight Riders and Sunrisers Hyderabad qualified for the Final. Kolkata played the final for the fourth time, winning twice (2012, 2014) before and being runners-up in 2021. Hyderabad played their third final, winning once in 2016 and runners-up in 2018.

== Road to the final ==
Kolkata Knight Riders had a successful league stage with only 3 losses against Chennai Super Kings, Rajasthan Royals and Punjab Kings. They also had 2 abandoned matches against Gujarat Titans and Rajasthan Royals. They won the rest 9 matches garnering a total of 20 points finishing atop the league table. They defeated Sunrisers Hyderabad in Qualifier 1 to gain their place in the Final.

Sunrisers Hyderabad finished second in the league table winning 8 games and losing 5 games to end with a total of 17 points. Their game against Gujarat Titans was abandoned. They lost the Qualifier 1 to Kolkata Knight Riders and had to defeat Rajasthan Royals in Qualifier 2 for a place in the Final.

Source: ESPNcricinfo

Kolkata Knight Riders
vs
Sunrisers Hyderabad
League Stage
Opponent
Scorecard
Result
Points
Match No.
Opponent
Scorecard
Result
Points
Sunrisers Hyderabad
23 March 2024
Won
2
1
Kolkata Knight Riders
23 March 2024
Lost
0
Royal Challengers Bengaluru
29 March 2024
Won
4
2
Mumbai Indians
27 March 2024
Won
2
Delhi Capitals
3 April 2024
Won
6
3
Gujarat Titans
31 March 2024
Lost
2
Chennai Super Kings
8 April 2024
Lost
6
4
Chennai Super Kings
5 April 2024
Won
4
Lucknow Super Giants
14 April 2024
Won
8
5
Punjab Kings
9 April 2024
Won
6
Rajasthan Royals
16 April 2024
Lost
8
6
Royal Challengers Bengaluru
15 April 2024
Won
8
Royal Challengers Bengaluru
21 April 2024
Won
10
7
Delhi Capitals
20 April 2024
Won
10
Punjab Kings
26 April 2024
Lost
10
8
Royal Challengers Bengaluru
25 April 2024
Lost
10
Delhi Capitals
29 April 2024
Won
12
9
Chennai Super Kings
28 April 2024
Lost
10
Mumbai Indians
3 May 2024
Won
14
10
Rajasthan Royals
2 May 2024
Won
12
Lucknow Super Giants
5 May 2024
Won
16
11
Mumbai Indians
6 May 2024
Lost
12
Mumbai Indians
11 May 2024
Won
18
12
Lucknow Super Giants
8 May 2024
Won
14
Gujarat Titans
13 May 2024
No result
19
13
Gujarat Titans
16 May 2024
No result
15
Rajasthan Royals
19 May 2024
No result
20
14
Punjab Kings
19 May 2024
Won
17

League progression
Team	Group matches														Playoffs		
Team	1	2	3	4	5	6	7	8	9	10	11	12	13	14	Q1/E	Q2	F
Kolkata Knight Riders	2	4	6	6	8	8	10	10	12	14	16	18	19	20	W		W
Sunrisers Hyderabad	0	2	2	4	6	8	10	10	10	12	12	14	15	17	L	W	L

Win	Loss	No result

- Note: The total points at the end of each group match are listed.
- Note: Click on the points (group matches) or W/L (playoffs) to see the match summary.
Playoff stage

Qualifier 1
21 May 2024 – Ahmedabad
1	Kolkata Knight Riders	164/2 (13.4 overs)
2	Sunrisers Hyderabad	159 (19.3 overs)
Eliminator
22 May 2024 – Ahmedabad
3	Rajasthan Royals	174/6 (19 overs)
4	Royal Challengers Bengaluru	172/8 (20 overs)

Qualifier 2
24 May 2024 – Chennai
Q1L	Sunrisers Hyderabad	175/9 (20 overs)
EW	Rajasthan Royals	139/7 (20 overs)

Final
26 May 2024 – Chennai
Q1W	Kolkata Knight Riders	114/2 (10.3 overs)
Q2W	Sunrisers Hyderabad	113 (18.3 overs)

- Sources: ESPNcricinfo
Opponent
Scorecard
Result

Opponent
Scorecard
Result
Sunrisers Hyderabad
21 May 2024
Won
Q1
Kolkata Knight Riders
21 May 2024
Lost
Qualified for the finals
Q2
Rajasthan Royals
24 May 2024
Won
2024 Indian Premier League final

== Match ==
=== Match officials ===
- On-field umpires: Jayaraman Madanagopal (Ind) and Nitin Menon (Ind)
- Third umpire: Michael Gough (Eng)
- Reserve umpire: Virender Sharma (Ind)
- Match referee: Manu Nayyar (Ind)
- Toss: Sunrisers Hyderabad won the toss and elected to bat.

=== Summary ===
Final
26 May 2024
19:30 (N)
Scorecard

Sunrisers Hyderabad; 113 (18.3 overs)	v	Kolkata Knight Riders; 114/2 (10.3 overs)
Pat Cummins 24 (19); Andre Russell 3/19 (2.3 overs)		Venkatesh Iyer 52* (26); Pat Cummins 1/18 (2 overs)

Kolkata Knight Riders won by 8 wickets
M. A. Chidambaram Stadium, Chennai
Umpires: Jayaraman Madanagopal (Ind) and Nitin Menon (Ind)
Player of the match: Mitchell Starc (Kolkata Knight Riders)

- Sunrisers Hyderabad won the toss and elected to bat.
- Kolkata Knight Riders won their third title. They became the first team to win the IPL under different captains (2012 and 2014 under Gautam Gambhir and 2024 under Shreyas Iyer). They also set the record for the fastest IPL final chase with 57 balls remaining, equalling the record for the fewest losses in a single tournament.
- This was the shortest-ever final in the IPL history.

=== Sunrisers Hyderabad innings ===
Sunrisers Hyderabad (SRH) won the toss and elected to bat. The team lost early wickets and never quite recovered. Abhishek Sharma was the first to fall, bowled by Australian fast bowler Mitchell Starc for just 2 runs in the opening over. Australian batter Travis Head followed soon after, caught behind for a duck off medium pacer Vaibhav Arora's bowling. SRH's top order continued to falter, with Rahul Tripathi scoring 9 runs before being caught off Starc's bowling, leaving SRH at 21 for the loss of 3 wickets in the fourth over.

South African Aiden Markram tried to stabilize the innings, scoring 20 runs off 23 balls, but he too fell, caught off West Indies' all-rounder Andre Russell's bowling. Nitish Kumar Reddy added 13 runs before being dismissed by fast bowler Harshit Rana, while South African Heinrich Klaasen contributed 16 runs before also falling to Rana. Shahbaz Ahmed managed 8 runs before being caught off spinner Varun Chakravarthy's bowling, and the impact player Abdul Samad was caught behind for 4 runs off Russell. Captain Pat Cummins, scored a brisk 24 off 19 balls, including two fours and a six, but his effort was cut short when he was caught off Russell's bowling. Jaydev Unadkat and Bhuvneshwar Kumar did not add much, with Unadkat out leg before wicket to Narine for 4 and Kumar remaining not out on 0.

KKR's bowling attack was led by Andre Russell, who claimed 3 wickets for 19 runs. Mitchell Starc took 2 wickets for 14 runs, while Harshit Rana matched Starc with 2 wickets for 24 runs. Sunil Narine and Varun Chakravarthy each picked up a wicket, conceding 16 and 9 runs respectively. SRH's innings included 13 extras, but their overall run rate of 6.10 was insufficient at the end.

=== Kolkata Knight Riders innings ===
Kolkata Knight Riders (KKR) was off to a quick start despite losing West Indian Sunil Narine early. Narine scored a quick 6 off 2 balls before being caught by Shahbaz Ahmed off captain Pat Cummins' bowling in the second over. This brought Venkatesh Iyer to the crease, who, alongside opener Afghan batter Rahmanullah Gurbaz, took control of the chase. Gurbaz scored 39 runs off 32 balls, including five fours and two sixes before eventually being dismissed in the ninth over, out leg before wicket by Shahbaz Ahmed, owing to a lack of Ball-Tracking and Ultra-edge. Iyer continued his innings after the loss of Gurbaz, reaching his fifty off just 24 balls. Shreyas Iyer, the KKR captain, joined him at the crease and contributed 6 off 3 balls, helping reach the target with more than nine overs to spare.

Indian medium pacer Bhuvneshwar Kumar conceded 25 runs in his 2 overs, while T. Natarajan gave away 29 runs in his 2 overs. Shahbaz Ahmed managed to pick up the wicket of Gurbaz, finishing with figures of 1 wicket for 22 in 2.3 overs. Pat Cummins was the only other wicket-taker, claiming Narine's wicket and ending with figures of 1 wicket for 18 runs in his 2 overs.

KKR ended with a decisive victory by 8 wickets securing their third IPL title.

=== Scorecard ===
Source: ESPNcricinfo

Key
* (IMP) indicates an impact player.

1st innings

Sunrisers Hyderabad innings
Player	Status	Runs	Balls	4s	6s	Strike rate
Abhishek Sharma	b Starc	2	5	0	0	40.00
Travis Head	c †Gurbaz b Arora	0	1	0	0	0.00
Rahul Tripathi	c Ramandeep b Starc	9	13	1	0	69.23
Aiden Markram	c Starc b Russell	20	23	3	0	86.95
Nitish Kumar Reddy	c †Gurbaz b Harshit	13	10	1	1	130.00
Heinrich Klaasen	b Harshit	16	17	1	0	94.11
Shahbaz Ahmed	c Narine b Varun	8	7	0	1	114.28
Abdul Samad (IMP)	c †Gurbaz b Russell	4	4	0	0	100.00
Pat Cummins	c Starc b Russell	24	19	2	1	126.31
Jaydev Unadkat	lbw b Narine	4	11	0	0	36.36
Bhuvneshwar Kumar	not out	0	1	0	0	0
T Natarajan						
Extras 13 (b 5, lb 2, w 6); Total 113 (18.3 overs)				8	3	6.10 RR

Fall of wickets: 2–1 (Abhishek, 0.5 ov), 6–2 (Head, 1.6 ov), 21–3 (Tripathi, 4.2 ov), 47–4 (Reddy, 6.6 ov), 62–5 (Markram, 10.2 ov), 71–6 (Shahbaz, 11.5 ov), 77–7 (Samad, 12.4 ov), 90–8 (Klaasen, 14.1 ov), 113–9 (Unadkat, 17.5 ov), 113–10 (Cummins, 18.3 ov)

Kolkata Knight Riders bowling
Bowler	Overs	Maidens	Runs	Wickets	Econ	Wides	NBs
Mitchell Starc	3	0	14	2	4.66	0	0
Vaibhav Arora	3	0	24	1	8.00	4	0
Harshit Rana	4	1	24	2	6.00	1	0
Sunil Narine	4	0	16	1	4.00	0	0
Andre Russell	2.3	0	19	3	7.60	1	0
Varun Chakravarthy	2	0	9	1	4.50	0	0

2nd innings

Impact players
Team	Out	In
Sunrisers Hyderabad	Travis Head	Abdul Samad
Kolkata Knight Riders	—N/a	—N/a

Kolkata Knight Riders innings
Player	Status	Runs	Balls	4s	6s	Strike rate
Rahmanullah Gurbaz	lbw b Shahbaz	39	32	5	2	121.87
Sunil Narine	c Shahbaz b Cummins	6	2	0	1	300.00
Venkatesh Iyer	not out	52	26	4	3	200.00
Shreyas Iyer	not out	6	3	1	0	200.00
Rinku Singh						
Andre Russell						
Ramandeep Singh						
Mitchell Starc						
Vaibhav Arora						
Harshit Rana						
Varun Chakravarthy						
Extras 11 (b4, lb 2, w 5); Total 114/2 (10.3 overs)				10	6	10.85 RR

Fall of wickets: 11–1 (Narine, 1.2 ov), 102–2 (Gurbaz, 8.5 ov)

Sunrisers Hyderabad bowling
Bowler	Overs	Maidens	Runs	Wickets	Econ	Wides	NBs
Bhuvneshwar Kumar	2	0	25	0	12.50	1	0
Pat Cummins	2	0	18	1	9.00	2	0
T Natarajan	2	0	29	0	14.50	2	0
Shahbaz Ahmed	2.3	0	22	1	8.80	0	0
Jaydev Unadkat	1	0	9	0	9.00	0	0
Aiden Markram	1	0	5	0	5.00	0	0
