= Rohan Pandit =

Indian cricket umpire (born 1981)

Personal information
- Full name: Rohan Pandit
- Born: 13 January 1981 (age 45)
- Role: Umpire

Umpiring information
- ODIs umpired: 6 (2025–2026)
- T20Is umpired: 14 (2023–2026)
- WTests umpired: 1 (2014)
- WODIs umpired: 5 (2014–2024)
- WT20Is umpired: 5 (2018–2023)
- Source: ESPN Cricinfo, 23 November 2023

Rohan Pandit (born 13 January 1981) is an Indian cricket umpire. He has stood in matches in the domestic Ranji Trophy tournament.

== Umpiring career ==
In July 2022, Pandit was enlisted in the A+ category of BCCI's umpire's panel. In October 2023, He was introduced to the International Panel of ICC Umpires replacing Anil Chaudhary.

On 24 November 2023, Pandit stood in his first men's international match during the 1st T20I between India and Australia.

== See also ==
- List of One Day International cricket umpires
- List of Twenty20 International cricket umpires
