= Shahbaz Ahmed (cricketer) =

Indian cricketer (born 1994)

Personal information
- Born: 11 December 1994 (age 31); Nuh, Haryana, India
- Batting: Left-handed
- Bowling: Slow left-arm orthodox
- Role: All-rounder

International information
- National side: India (2022–2023)
- ODI debut (cap 247): 9 October 2022 v South Africa
- Last ODI: 4 December 2022 v Bangladesh
- ODI shirt no.: 47
- T20I debut (cap 110): 6 October 2023 v Bangladesh
- Last T20I: 7 October 2023 v Afghanistan
- T20I shirt no.: 47

Domestic team information
- Years: Team
- 2018–present: Bengal
- 2020–2023: Royal Challengers Bangalore
- 2024: Sunrisers Hyderabad
- 2025–present: Lucknow Super Giants

Career statistics
Competition	ODI	T20I	FC	T20
Matches	3	2	38	114
Runs scored	0	0	2,192	1,355
Batting average	0.00	–	44.73	25.56
100s/50s	0/0	0/0	2/16	1/4
Top score	0	–	116	100*
Balls bowled	156	32	5,888	1,694
Wickets	3	2	125	73
Bowling average	41.66	20.50	21.96	30.43
5 wickets in innings	0	0	6	0
10 wickets in match	0	0	1	0
Best bowling	2/32	1/13	7/57	3/7
Catches/stumpings	1/–	0/–	15/–	41/–
Medal record
Men's cricket
Representing India
Asian Games
Gold medal – first place	2022 Hangzhou	Team
- Source: ESPNcricinfo, 20 December 2025

Shahbaz Ahmed (born 11 December 1994) is an Indian international cricketer. He is an all-rounder who bats left-handed and bowls left-arm orthodox spin. He represents Bengal in domestic cricket and Lucknow Super Giants in the Indian Premier League. Shahbaz was a member of the Indian team that won gold medal at the 2022 Asian Games.

== Early and personal life ==
Shahbaz Ahmed was born on 11 December 1994 in the Nuh district of Haryana. He is the son of Ahmed Jan, a clerk in the sub-divisional magistrate's office of Haryana's Nuh district, and Abnam Ahmed, a housewife.

Shahbaz was a brilliant student with 80% in Class 10 and 88% in Class 12. Much to the chagrin of his parents, Shahbaz decided to drop out of his engineering studies to pursue his cricket career. Shahbaz later completed his B.Tech. degree during the Covid lockdown in India.

Once he had taken the decision of pursuing cricket as a career, with his parents' permission Shahbaz shifted to Kolkata where he stayed in a small room with three fellow cricketers, while earning a livelihood by washing utensils.

Shahbaz started playing cricket in the second division in Kolkata, where he was introduced to his coach Partha Pratim Chowdhury by a first class cricketer Pramod Chandila. With the help of Partha he got into Tapan Memorial Club, a cricket academy in Kolkata and started living with Partha's family.

Shahbaz's performances caught the eye of the then Bengal skipper Manoj Tiwary who took him under his wings and found a mentor in Bengal Coach Arun Lal. He became Bengal's crisis man and was instrumental in them reaching the finals of 2019–20 Ranji Trophy earning him the nickname Jaanbaaz.

== International career ==
In August 2022, Shahbaz was named as a replacement for injured Washington Sundar in India's ODI squad for their tour against Zimbabwe. In October 2022, he was named in India's ODI squad, for their series against South Africa. He made his ODI debut on 9 October 2022 against South Africa. He made his T20I debut on 6 October 2023 against Bangladesh. In December 2025, he was named as a replacement for Axar Patel in India's T20I squad for South Africa's tour against India.

== Domestic career ==
Shahbaz made his List A debut for Bengal in the 2018–19 Vijay Hazare Trophy on 20 September 2018 against Jammu and Kashmir team at Chennai. He returned with figures of 1/22 in his debut match. During his maiden first-class cap versus Hyderabad, he scored 27 runs and picked one wicket. He made his Twenty20 debut for Bengal in the 2018–19 Syed Mushtaq Ali Trophy on 24 February 2019 against Haryana at Cuttack and picked one wicket again besides contributing a vital 12-ball 17 in the lower order that eventually helped his team win the match by three wickets.

So far, Shahbaz has played 13 first-class matches, scoring 559 runs, including four half-centuries, taking 37 first-class wickets at an economy rate of 2.60. In List-A cricket, he has scored 435 runs in 16 innings at an average of 39.54. He has 18 List-A wickets to his name, with his best figures of 3/35. In T20 cricket, he has taken 21 wickets in 23 innings at an economy rate of 6.84 and has recorded one fifty.

In January 2021, against Hyderabad, he became the seventh player from Bengal and first since India pacer Mohammed Shami to claim a Ranji Trophy hat-trick.

In October 2019, he was named in India A's squad for the 2019–20 Deodhar Trophy.

=== Indian Premier League ===
In the 2020 IPL auction, he was bought by the Royal Challengers Bangalore ahead of the 2020 Indian Premier League.

He made his debut in the IPL against Rajasthan Royals, during the 33rd match of 2020 Indian Premier League. Shahbaz went wicketless and conceded 18 runs. Throughout the season, he took a couple of wickets in as many games he played with an economy rate of 7.33. In April 2021, Shahbaz took three wickets in one over against the Sunrisers Hyderabad during the sixth match of 2021 Indian Premier League, which was eventually won by his team. His performances earned praise from a section of critics. During the second phase of the tournament, against Rajasthan he took a brace for 10 runs.

In February 2022, he was bought by the Royal Challengers Bangalore in the auction for the 2022 Indian Premier League tournament. In November 2023, he was traded to Sunrisers Hyderabad.
