= Jayaraman Madanagopal =

Indian cricketer (born 1974)

Personal information
- Full name: Jayaraman Madanagopal
- Born: 7 November 1974 (age 52); Chennai, Tamil Nadu, India
- Batting: Right-handed
- Bowling: Right-arm off-break
- Role: Batsman

Domestic team information
- Years: Team
- 1998/99–2003/04: Tamil Nadu
- 2004/05–2006/07: Tamil Union Cricket and Athletic Club

Umpiring information
- Tests umpired: 2 (2025)
- ODIs umpired: 18 (2022–2025)
- T20Is umpired: 37 (2021–2026)
- WODIs umpired: 7 (2013–2024)
- WT20Is umpired: 3 (2019–2024)
- Source: ESPNcricinfo, 22 June 2023

Jayaraman Madanagopal (born 7 November 1974) is an Indian cricket umpire and former first-class cricketer. Having officiated in matches in the Ranji Trophy, Madanagopal stood in his first Twenty20 International (T20I), between India and New Zealand, on 19 November 2021. On 6 October 2022, he stood in his first One Day International (ODI), between India and South Africa. He was also the third umpire for the final test of the 2023 Border-Gavaskar Trophy. In March, 2025, he was promoted to the 'Emerging Panel of ICC Umpires' which made him liable to officiate over the seas test matches and one-day internationals.

== See also ==
- List of Test cricket umpires
- List of One Day International cricket umpires
- List of Twenty20 International cricket umpires
