= 2023 Rajasthan Royals season =

Rajasthan Royals
2023 season
- Captains: Sanju Samson
- Indian Premier League: 5th place
- Most runs: Yashasvi Jaiswal (625)
- Most wickets: Yuzvendra Chahal (21)

Rajasthan Royals (abbreviated as RR) is a franchise cricket team based in Rajasthan, India, which plays in the Indian Premier League (IPL).

== Player acquisition ==
The RR acquired Jason Holder, Donovan Ferreira, Kunal Rathore, Adam Zampa, KM Asif, Murugan Ashwin, Akash Vashisht, Abdul P A, and Joe Root

== Squad ==
The squad for 2023 was:

Batsmen:

Name	Nationality	Birth date	Batting style	Bowling style
Shimron Hetmyer	West Indies	26 December 1996 (aged 26)	Left-handed	-
Yashasvi Jaiswal	India	28 December 2001 (aged 21)	Left-handed	Leg break
Devdutt Padikkal	India	27 July 2000 (aged 22)	Left-handed	Right arm off break
Joe Root	England	30 December 1990 (aged 32)	Right-handed	Right arm off break
Riyan Parag	India	10 November 2001 (aged 21)	Right-handed	Right arm off break, leg break

Wicket-keepers:

Name	Nationality	Birth date	Batting style	Bowling style
Sanju Samson	India		Right-handed	-
Jos Buttler	England		Right-handed	-
Dhruv Jurel	India		Right-handed	-
Kunal Singh Rathore	India		Left-handed	-

All rounders:

Name	Nationality	Birth date	Batting style	Bowling style
Abdul Basith	India			
Ravichandran Ashwin	India			
Donovan Ferreira	South Africa			
Jason Holder	West Indies			
Akash Vasisht	India			

Bowlers:

Name	Nationality	Birth date	Batting style	Bowling style
Murugan Ashwin	India		Right-handed	Legbreak Googly
KM Asif	India		Right-handed	Right-arm Medium
Trent Boult	New Zealand		Right-handed	Left-arm Fast medium
KC Cariappa	India		Right-handed	Legbreak
Yuzvendra Chahal	India		Right-handed	Legbreak Googly
Obed McCoy	West Indies		Left-handed	Left-arm Fast medium
Navdeep Saini	India		Right-handed	Right-arm Fast
Sandeep Sharma	India		Right-handed	Right-arm Medium
Kuldeep Sen	India		Right-handed	Right-arm Fast
Kuldip Yadav	India		Left-handed	Left-arm Fast medium
Adam Zampa	Australia		Right-handed	Legbreak Googly
Prasidh Krishna	India		Right-handed	Right-arm Fast medium

== Administration and support staff ==
Position	Name
Owner	Manoj Badale
CEO	
Head coach	Kumar Sangakarra
Fielding coach	Dishant Yagnik

== Kit manufacturers and sponsors ==
Kit Manufacturers	Shirt Sponsor (Chest)	Shirt Sponsor (Back)	Chest Branding
	Luminous		
Source :

== Indian Premier League ==
On 2 April, the Royals started their season campaign with a dominant victory over the Sunrisers Hyderabad. Batting first, the Royals got off to an explosive start, with Jos Buttler, Yashasvi Jaiswal, and Sanju Samson recording half-centuries. 85 runs were scored in the powerplay, and the total crossed 100 in just 7.4 overs. While the middle order faltered later on, a vital cameo from Shimron Hetmyer helped Rajasthan post a total of 203 runs, for the loss of five wickets. In the first over of the second innings, Trent Boult dismissed both Abhishek Sharma and Rahul Tripathi for ducks. The rest of the batting lineup quickly collapsed, with the score standing at 95 runs for 8 wickets at one point. Abdul Samad offered resistance with his knock of 32*, but the Sunrisers ended their innings with 131/8, falling short of the Royals' total by 72 runs.

In their second match of the season, on 5 April, they lost to the Punjab Kings in a close encounter. In the first innings, openers Shikhar Dhawan and Prabhsimran got the Kings off to a great start, with 63 runs being score in the powerplay for no loss. In the second innings, the Royals sent Ravichandran Ashwin out as an opener, since Jos Buttler was recovering from an injury sustained earlier on in the match. Ashwin, however, was dismissed for a duck as the Royals struggled to gain momentum.

They recorded a 57-run victory over the Delhi Capitals on 8 April.

On 12 April, they won against the Chennai Super Kings.

On 16 April, they defeated the Gujarat Titans.

On 23 April, they suffered a defeat at the hands of the Royal Challengers Bangalore.

On 27 April, they won against the Chennai Super Kings.

On 30 April, they lost to the Mumbai Indians despite a century from Jaiswal.

They lost to the Gujarat Titans on 5 May. This was Rajasthan's fourth loss in five games, dwindling their chances for a spot in the playoffs.

On 7 May, they lost to the Sunrisers.

On 11 May, they won against the Kolkata Knight Riders.

On 14 May, the Royals suffered a defeat by the Royal Challengers Bangalore, registering the lowest total of the season.

In their final match of the season, they defeated the Punjab Kings.
