= 2024 Rajasthan Royals season =

2024 Indian Premier League cricket team

Rajasthan Royals
2024 season
- Coach: Kumar Sangakkara
- Captain: Sanju Samson
- Ground(s): Sawai Mansingh Stadium, Jaipur; ACA Stadium, Guwahati
- IPL League: Qualified for Playoffs (Eliminator)
- IPL Eliminator: Advanced to Qualifier 2
- IPL Qualifier 2: Eliminated (3rd in tournament)
- Most runs: Riyan Parag (573)
- Most wickets: Avesh Khan (19)
- Most catches: Dhruv Jurel (13)
- Most wicket-keeping dismissals: Sanju Samson (7)

The 2024 season was the 15th season for the Indian Premier League franchise Rajasthan Royals. They were one of the ten teams competed in the 2024 Indian Premier League. They finished at the 5th place in previous season's League stage.

After Lucknow's 7th loss on 14 May 2024, Rajasthan qualified for the Playoffs. They finished the League stage at the 3rd place with 8 wins and 5 losses, garnering 17 points and seeding their place in the Eliminator.

After defeating Royal Challengers Bengaluru in the Eliminator played on 22 May at Ahmedabad, Rajasthan advanced to the Qualifier 2. After being defeated by Sunrisers Hyderabad in the Qualifier 2 played on 24 May at Chennai, Rajasthan were eliminated from the tournament. They finished at the 3rd place in the tournament after losing the Qualifier 2.

The Rajasthan Royals drew an average home attendance of 22,119 in the IPL in 2024.

== Squad ==
- Players with international caps are listed in **bold**.
- Ages are as of 22 March 2024, the date of the first match in the competition

Squad for the 2024 Indian Premier League
No.	Name	Nationality	Birth date	Batting style	Bowling style	Year signed	Salary	Notes
Captain
11	Sanju Samson	India	11 November 1994 (aged 29)	Right-handed	Right-arm off-spin	2018	₹16 crore (US$1.9 million)	Wicket-keeper
Batters
5	Riyan Parag	India	10 November 2001 (aged 22)	Right-handed	Right-arm leg break	2019	₹3.8 crore (US$450,000)	
189	Shimron Hetmyer	West Indies	26 December 1996 (aged 27)	Left-handed	–	2022	₹8.5 crore (US$1.0 million)	Overseas
64	Yashasvi Jaiswal	India	28 December 2001 (aged 22)	Left-handed	Right-arm leg break	2022	₹4 crore (US$470,000)	
52	Rovman Powell	West Indies	23 July 1993 (aged 30)	Right-handed	Right-arm medium-fast	2023	₹7.4 crore (US$880,000)	Overseas
27	Shubham Dubey	India	27 August 1994 (aged 29)	Left-handed	Right-arm off spin	2023	₹5.8 crore (US$690,000)	
2	Donavon Ferreira	South Africa	21 July 1998 (aged 25)	Right-handed	–	2023	₹50 lakh (US$59,000)	Overseas
Wicket-keepers
63	Jos Buttler	England	8 September 1990 (aged 33)	Right-handed	–	2018	₹10 crore (US$1.2 million)	Overseas; Withdrew (Note: English cricketers (including Jos Buttler) withdrew on 13 May 2024 due to the upcoming T20WC.)
21	Dhruv Jurel	India	21 January 2001 (aged 23)	Right-handed	–	2022	₹20 lakh (US$24,000)	
32	Tom Kohler-Cadmore	England	19 August 1994 (aged 29)	Right-handed	Right-arm off-break	2023	₹40 lakh (US$47,000)	Overseas
14	Kunal Singh Rathore	India	9 October 2002 (aged 21)	Left-handed	–	2023	₹20 lakh (US$24,000)	
All-rounders
99	Ravichandran Ashwin	India	17 September 1986 (aged 37)	Right-handed	Right-arm off break	2022	₹5 crore (US$590,000)	
16	Tanush Kotian	India	16 October 1998 (aged 25)	Right-handed	Right-arm off break	2024	₹20 lakh (US$24,000)	Replacement (Note: Tanush Kotian replaced Adam Zampa, after the latter withdrew due to Personal reasons.)
Pace bowlers
18	Trent Boult	New Zealand	22 July 1989 (aged 34)	Right-handed	Left-arm fast-medium	2022	₹8 crore (US$950,000)	Overseas
17	Nandre Burger	South Africa	11 August 1995 (aged 28)	Left-handed	Left-arm medium fast	2023	₹50 lakh (US$59,000)	Overseas
6	Avesh Khan	India	13 December 1996 (aged 27)	Right-handed	Right-arm fast-medium	2024	₹10 crore (US$1.2 million)	Traded (Note: Ahead of the 2024 auction, Avesh Khan was traded from Lucknow Super Giants to Rajasthan.)
24	Prasidh Krishna	India	19 February 1996 (aged 28)	Right-handed	Right-arm fast-medium	2022	₹10 crore (US$1.2 million)	Withdrew (Note: Keshav Maharaj replaced Prasidh Krishna, after the latter withdrew due to Left Proximal Quadriceps Tendon surgery.)
96	Navdeep Saini	India	23 November 1992 (aged 31)	Right-handed	Right-arm fast	2022	₹2.6 crore (US$310,000)	
44	Kuldeep Sen	India	22 October 1996 (aged 27)	Right-handed	Right-arm fast	2022	₹20 lakh (US$24,000)	
20	Sandeep Sharma	India	18 May 1993 (aged 30)	Right-handed	Right-arm medium	2023	₹50 lakh (US$59,000)	
Spin bowlers
3	Yuzvendra Chahal	India	23 July 1990 (aged 33)	Right-handed	Right-arm leg break	2022	₹6.5 crore (US$770,000)	
88	Adam Zampa	Australia	31 March 1992 (aged 31)	Right-handed	Right-arm leg break	2023	₹1.5 crore (US$180,000)	Overseas; Withdrew
1	Abid Mushtaq	India	17 January 1997 (aged 27)	Left-handed	Left-arm orthodox	2023	₹20 lakh (US$24,000)	
25	Keshav Maharaj	South Africa	7 February 1990 (aged 34)	Right-handed	Left-arm orthodox	2024	₹50 lakh (US$59,000)	Overseas; Replacement

- Source: ESPNcricinfo

== Administration and support staff ==
Position	Name
CEO	Jake Lush McCrum
Team manager	Romi Bhinder
Head coach	Kumar Sangakkara
Batting coach	Trevor Penney
Bowling coach	Shane Bond
Fielding coach	Dishant Yagnik

== League stage ==
=== Points table ===
Pos	Grp	Team	Pld	W	L	NR	Pts	NRR	Qualification
1	A	Kolkata Knight Riders (C)	14	9	3	2	20	1.428	Advanced to Qualifier 1
2	B	Sunrisers Hyderabad (R)	14	8	5	1	17	0.414	Advanced to Qualifier 1
3	A	Rajasthan Royals (3rd)	14	8	5	1	17	0.273	Advanced to Eliminator
4	B	Royal Challengers Bengaluru (4th)	14	7	7	0	14	0.459	Advanced to Eliminator
5	B	Chennai Super Kings	14	7	7	0	14	0.392	Eliminated
6	A	Delhi Capitals	14	7	7	0	14	−0.377	Eliminated
7	A	Lucknow Super Giants	14	7	7	0	14	−0.667	Eliminated
8	B	Gujarat Titans	14	5	7	2	12	−1.063	Eliminated
9	B	Punjab Kings	14	5	9	0	10	−0.353	Eliminated
10	A	Mumbai Indians	14	4	10	0	8	−0.318	Eliminated

Source: ESPNcricinfo
(C) Champions; (R) Runners-up

=== League progression ===
League progression
Team	Group matches														Playoffs		
Team	1	2	3	4	5	6	7	8	9	10	11	12	13	14	Q1/E	Q2	F
Rajasthan Royals	2	4	6	8	8	10	12	14	16	16	16	16	16	17	W	L	

Win	Loss	No result

- Note: The total points at the end of each group match are listed.
- Note: Click on the points (group matches) or W/L (playoffs) to see the match summary.

=== Fixtures and results ===
Match 4
24 March 2024
15:30 (D/N)
Scorecard

(H) Rajasthan Royals; 193/4 (20 overs)	v	Lucknow Super Giants; 173/6 (20 overs)
Sanju Samson 82* (52); Naveen-ul-Haq 2/41 (4 overs)		Nicholas Pooran 64* (41); Trent Boult 2/35 (4 overs)

Rajasthan Royals won by 20 runs
Sawai Mansingh Stadium, Jaipur
Umpires: Kumar Dharmasena (SL) and Akshay Totre (Ind)
Player of the match: Sanju Samson (Rajasthan Royals)

- Rajasthan Royals won the toss and elected to bat.

Match 9
28 March 2024
19:30 (N)
Scorecard

(H) Rajasthan Royals; 185/5 (20 overs)	v	Delhi Capitals; 173/5 (20 overs)
Riyan Parag 84* (45); Axar Patel 1/21 (4 overs)		David Warner 49 (34); Yuzvendra Chahal 2/19 (3 overs)

Rajasthan Royals won by 12 runs
Sawai Mansingh Stadium, Jaipur
Umpires: Nand Kishore (Ind) and Nitin Menon (Ind)
Player of the match: Riyan Parag (Rajasthan Royals)

- Delhi Capitals won the toss and elected to field.

Match 14
1 April 2024
19:30 (N)
Scorecard

(H) Mumbai Indians; 125/9 (20 overs)	v	Rajasthan Royals; 127/4 (15.3 overs)
Hardik Pandya 34 (21); Yuzvendra Chahal 3/11 (4 overs)		Riyan Parag 54* (39); Akash Madhwal 3/20 (4 overs)

Rajasthan Royals won by 6 wickets
Wankhede Stadium, Mumbai
Umpires: Yeshwant Barde (Ind) and Saidharshan Kumar (Ind)
Player of the match: Trent Boult (Rajasthan Royals)

- Rajasthan Royals won the toss and elected to field.

Match 19
6 April 2024
19:30 (N)
Scorecard

Royal Challengers Bengaluru; 183/3 (20 overs)	v	Rajasthan Royals (H); 189/4 (19.1 overs)
Virat Kohli 113* (72); Yuzvendra Chahal 2/34 (4 overs)		Jos Buttler 100* (58); Reece Topley 2/27 (4 overs)

Rajasthan Royals won by 6 wickets
Sawai Mansingh Stadium, Jaipur
Umpires: Tapan Sharma (Ind) and Alex Wharf (Eng)
Player of the match: Jos Buttler (Rajasthan Royals)

- Rajasthan Royals won the toss and elected to field.

Match 24
10 April 2024
19:30 (N)
Scorecard

(H) Rajasthan Royals; 196/3 (20 overs)	v	Gujarat Titans; 199/7 (20 overs)
Riyan Parag 76 (48); Rashid Khan 1/18 (4 overs)		Shubman Gill 72 (44); Kuldeep Sen 3/41 (4 overs)

Gujarat Titans won by 3 wickets
Sawai Mansingh Stadium, Jaipur
Umpires: Kumar Dharmasena (SL) and Vinod Seshan (Ind)
Player of the match: Rashid Khan (Gujarat Titans)

- Gujarat Titans won the toss and elected to field.

Match 27
13 April 2024
19:30 (N)
Scorecard

(H) Punjab Kings; 147/8 (20 overs)	v	Rajasthan Royals; 152/7 (19.5 overs)
Ashutosh Sharma 31 (16); Keshav Maharaj 2/23 (4 overs)		Yashasvi Jaiswal 39 (28); Kagiso Rabada 2/18 (4 overs)

Rajasthan Royals won by 3 wickets
Maharaja Yadavindra Singh International Cricket Stadium, Mullanpur
Umpires: Anil Chaudhary (Ind) and Tapan Sharma (Ind)
Player of the match: Shimron Hetmyer (Rajasthan Royals)

- Rajasthan Royals won the toss and elected to field.

Match 31
16 April 2024
19:30 (N)
Scorecard

(H) Kolkata Knight Riders; 223/6 (20 overs)	v	Rajasthan Royals; 224/8 (20 overs)
Sunil Narine 109 (56); Avesh Khan 2/35 (4 overs)		Jos Buttler 107* (60); Sunil Narine 2/30 (4 overs)

Rajasthan Royals won by 2 wickets
Eden Gardens, Kolkata
Umpires: Ulhas Gandhe (Ind) and Michael Gough (Eng)
Player of the match: Jos Buttler (Rajasthan Royals)

- Rajasthan Royals won the toss and elected to field.
- Rajasthan Royals recorded the joint highest successful run chase in IPL history.

Match 38
22 April 2024
19:30 (N)
Scorecard

Mumbai Indians; 179/9 (20 overs)	v	Rajasthan Royals (H); 183/1 (18.4 overs)
Tilak Varma 65 (45); Sandeep Sharma 5/18 (4 overs)		Yashasvi Jaiswal 104* (60); Piyush Chawla 1/33 (4 overs)

Rajasthan Royals won by 9 wickets
Sawai Mansingh Stadium, Jaipur
Umpires: Anil Chaudhary (Ind) and Saidharshan Kumar (Ind)
Player of the match: Sandeep Sharma (Rajasthan Royals)

- Mumbai Indians won the toss and elected to bat.

Match 44
27 April 2024
19:30 (N)
Scorecard

(H) Lucknow Super Giants; 196/5 (20 overs)	v	Rajasthan Royals; 199/3 (19 overs)
KL Rahul 76 (48); Sandeep Sharma 2/31 (4 overs)		Sanju Samson 71* (33); Marcus Stoinis 1/3 (1 over)

Rajasthan Royals won by 7 wickets
BRSABV Ekana Cricket Stadium, Lucknow
Umpires: K. N. Ananthapadmanabhan (Ind) and Michael Gough (Eng)
Player of the match: Sanju Samson (Rajasthan Royals)

- Rajasthan Royals won the toss and elected to field.

Match 50
2 May 2024
19:30 (N)
Scorecard

(H) Sunrisers Hyderabad; 201/3 (20 overs)	v	Rajasthan Royals; 200/7 (20 overs)
Nitish Kumar Reddy 76* (42); Avesh Khan 2/39 (4 overs)		Riyan Parag 77 (49); Bhuvneshwar Kumar 3/41 (4 overs)

Sunrisers Hyderabad won by 1 run
Rajiv Gandhi International Cricket Stadium, Hyderabad
Umpires: Yeshwant Barde (Ind) and Anil Chaudhary (Ind)
Player of the match: Bhuvneshwar Kumar (Sunrisers Hyderabad)

- Sunrisers Hyderabad won the toss and elected to bat.

Match 56
7 May 2024
19:30 (N)
Scorecard

(H) Delhi Capitals; 221/8 (20 overs)	v	Rajasthan Royals; 201/8 (20 overs)
Abhishek Porel 65 (36); Ravichandran Ashwin 3/24 (4 overs)		Sanju Samson 86 (46); Kuldeep Yadav 2/25 (4 overs)

Delhi Capitals won by 20 runs
Arun Jaitley Stadium, Delhi
Umpires: K. N. Ananthapadmanabhan (Ind) and Ulhas Gandhe (Ind)
Player of the match: Kuldeep Yadav (Delhi Capitals)

- Rajasthan Royals won the toss and elected to field.

Match 61
12 May 2024
15:30 (D/N)
Scorecard

Rajasthan Royals; 141/5 (20 overs)	v	Chennai Super Kings (H); 145/5 (18.2 overs)
Riyan Parag 47* (35); Simarjeet Singh 3/26 (4 overs)		Ruturaj Gaikwad 42* (41); Ravichandran Ashwin 2/35 (4 overs)

Chennai Super Kings won by 5 wickets
M. A. Chidambaram Stadium, Chennai
Umpires: Yeshwant Barde (Ind) and Rohan Pandit (Ind)
Player of the match: Simarjeet Singh (Chennai Super Kings)

- Rajasthan Royals won the toss and elected to bat.

Match 65
15 May 2024
19:30 (N)
Scorecard

(H) Rajasthan Royals; 144/9 (20 overs)	v	Punjab Kings; 145/5 (18.5 overs)
Riyan Parag 48 (34); Sam Curran 2/24 (3 overs)		Sam Curran 63* (41); Avesh Khan 2/28 (3.5 overs)

Punjab Kings won by 5 wickets
Assam Cricket Association Stadium, Guwahati
Umpires: Saidharshan Kumar (Ind) and Rohan Pandit (Ind)
Player of the match: Sam Curran (Punjab Kings)

- Rajasthan Royals won the toss and elected to bat.

Match 70
19 May 2024
19:30 (N)
Scorecard

(H) Rajasthan Royals	v	Kolkata Knight Riders

Match abandoned
Assam Cricket Association Stadium, Guwahati
Umpires: Anil Chaudhary (Ind) and Saidharshan Kumar (Ind)

- Kolkata Knight Riders won the toss and elected to field.
- No play was possible due to rain.
- Sunrisers Hyderabad advanced to Qualifier 1 as a result of this match.

== Playoffs ==
=== Bracket ===
Qualifier 1
21 May 2024 – Ahmedabad
1	Kolkata Knight Riders	164/2 (13.4 overs)
2	Sunrisers Hyderabad	159 (19.3 overs)
Eliminator
22 May 2024 – Ahmedabad
3	Rajasthan Royals	174/6 (19 overs)
4	Royal Challengers Bengaluru	172/8 (20 overs)

Qualifier 2
24 May 2024 – Chennai
Q1L	Sunrisers Hyderabad	175/9 (20 overs)
EW	Rajasthan Royals	139/7 (20 overs)

Final
26 May 2024 – Chennai
Q1W	Kolkata Knight Riders	114/2 (10.3 overs)
Q2W	Sunrisers Hyderabad	113 (18.3 overs)

=== Eliminator ===
Eliminator
22 May 2024
19:30 (N)
Scorecard

Royal Challengers Bengaluru; 172/8 (20 overs)	v	Rajasthan Royals; 174/6 (19 overs)
Rajat Patidar 34 (22); Avesh Khan 3/44 (4 overs)		Yashasvi Jaiswal 45 (30); Mohammed Siraj 2/33 (4 overs)

Rajasthan Royals won by 4 wickets
Narendra Modi Stadium, Ahmedabad
Umpires: K. N. Ananthapadmanabhan (Ind) and Saidharshan Kumar (Ind)
Player of the match: Ravichandran Ashwin (Rajasthan Royals)

- Rajasthan Royals won the toss and elected to field.

=== Qualifier 2 ===
Qualifier 2
24 May 2024
19:30 (N)
Scorecard

Sunrisers Hyderabad; 175/9 (20 overs)	v	Rajasthan Royals; 139/7 (20 overs)
Heinrich Klaasen 50 (34); Avesh Khan 3/27 (4 overs)		Dhruv Jurel 56* (35); Shahbaz Ahmed 3/23 (4 overs)

Sunrisers Hyderabad won by 36 runs
M. A. Chidambaram Stadium, Chennai
Umpires: Nitin Menon (Ind) and Virender Sharma (Ind)
Player of the match: Shahbaz Ahmed (Sunrisers Hyderabad)

- Rajasthan Royals won the toss and elected to field.
- Sunrisers Hyderabad qualified for the final for the 3rd time in IPL history.

== Statistics ==
=== Most runs ===
Runs	Player	Innings	Highest score
573	Riyan Parag	14	84 not out
531	Sanju Samson	15	86
435	Yashasvi Jaiswal	15	104 not out
359	Jos Buttler	11	107 not out
195	Dhruv Jurel	11	56 not out

- Source: ESPNcricinfo

=== Most wickets ===
Wickets	Player	Matches	Best bowling
19	Avesh Khan	15	3/27
18	Yuzvendra Chahal	15	3/11
16	Trent Boult	15	3/22
13	Sandeep Sharma	10	5/18
9	Ravichandran Ashwin	14	3/24

- Source: ESPNcricinfo
