= 2025 Rajasthan Royals season =

Indian Premier League cricket team

Rajasthan Royals
2025 season
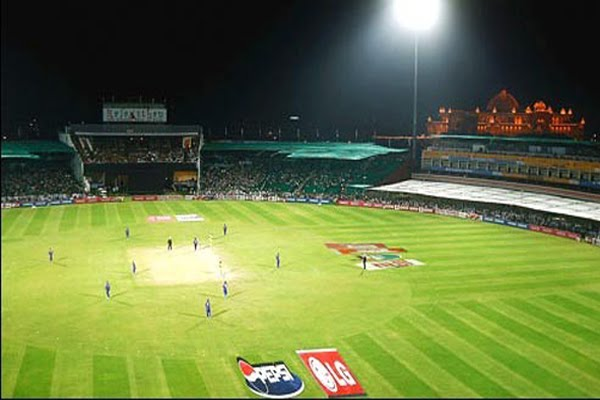
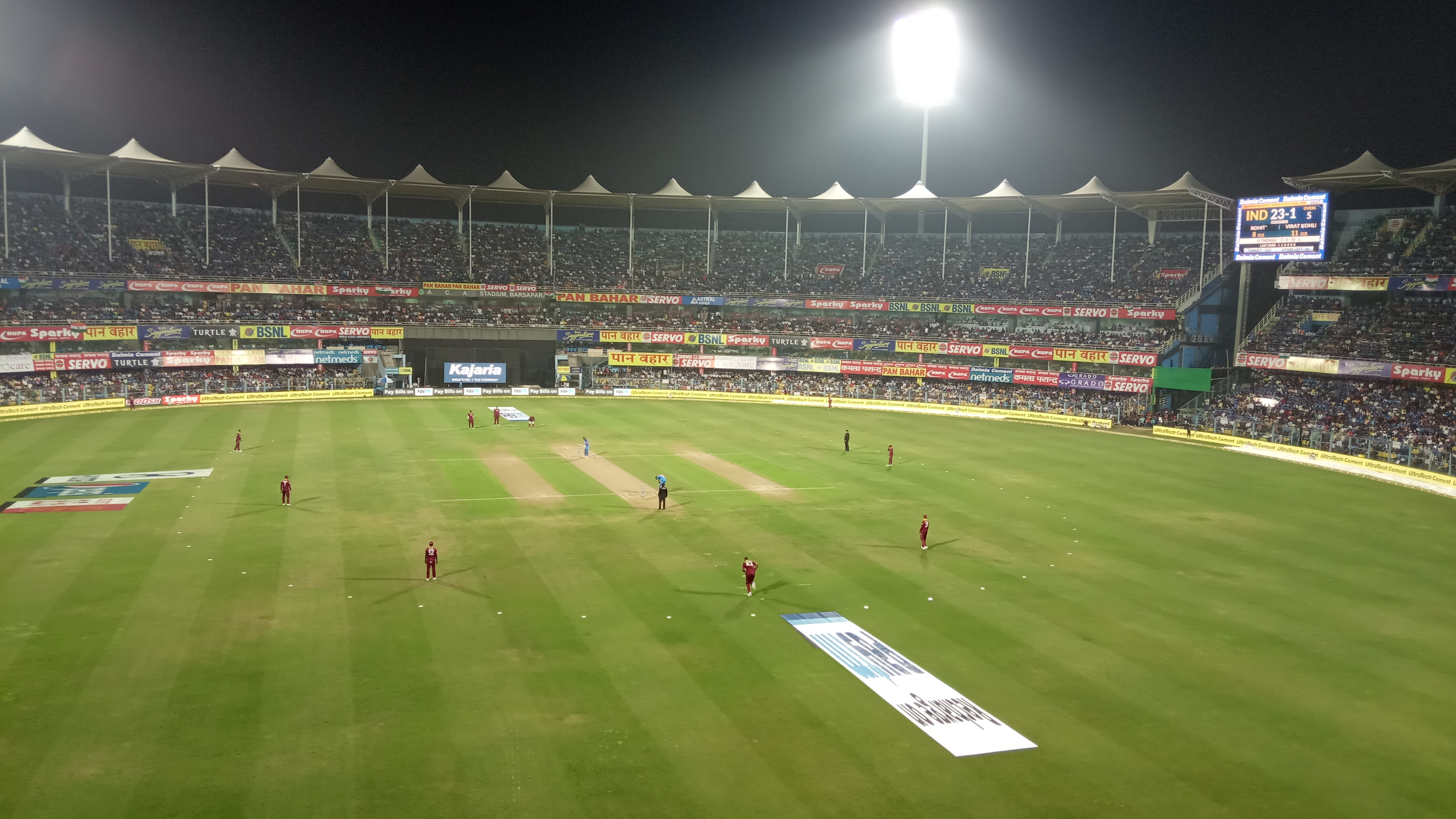
- Sawai Mansingh Stadium and ACA Cricket Stadium, home grounds of Rajasthan Royals
- Coach: Rahul Dravid
- Captain: Sanju Samson
- Ground(s): Sawai Mansingh Stadium, Jaipur; ACA Cricket Stadium, Guwahati
- League stage: 9th place
- Most runs: Yashasvi Jaiswal (559)
- Most wickets: Wanindu Hasaranga; Jofra Archer; Maheesh Theekshana (11 each)
- Most catches: Shimron Hetmyer (13)
- Most wicket-keeping dismissals: Sanju Samson (5)

The 2025 season was the 16th season for the Indian Premier League (IPL) cricket franchise Rajasthan Royals. They were one of the ten teams that competed in the 2025 IPL. The team was captained by Sanju Samson and coached by Rahul Dravid.

Rajasthan Royals were the second team to be eliminated from the 2025 IPL and finished the season in ninth place with four wins from 14 matches. Yashasvi Jaiswal scored the most runs (559) while Wanindu Hasaranga, Jofra Archer and Maheesh Theekshana took the most wickets (11 each) for Rajasthan in the 2025 season.

== Pre-season ==
The 2025 Indian Premier League was the 18th edition of the Indian Premier League (IPL), a professional Twenty20 (T20) cricket league, organised by the Board of Control for Cricket in India (BCCI). Rajasthan Royals had previously won the title once in the 2008 inaugural IPL. The team finished in third place in the previous season. The tournament featured ten teams competing in 74 matches from 22 March to 3 June 2025. Rajasthan played most of their home matches at Sawai Mansingh Stadium with two matches played at ACA Cricket Stadium.

=== Player retention ===
Franchises were allowed to retain a maximum of six players from their squad, including a maximum of five recent international players. Franchises were required to submit their retention lists before 31 October 2024. Rajasthan retained six players, including captain Sanju Samson.

Retained players
| No. | Player | Salary |
|---|---|---|
| 1 | Sanju Samson | ₹18 crore (US$1.9 million) |
| 2 | Yashasvi Jaiswal | ₹18 crore (US$1.9 million) |
| 3 | Dhruv Jurel | ₹14 crore (US$1.5 million) |
| 4 | Riyan Parag | ₹14 crore (US$1.5 million) |
| 5 | Shimron Hetmyer | ₹11 crore (US$1.1 million) |
| 6 | Sandeep Sharma | ₹4 crore (US$420,000) |

Released players
| Batters | Wicket-keepers | All-rounders | Fast bowlers | Spin bowlers |
|---|---|---|---|---|
| Rovman Powell; Shubham Dubey; Tom Kohler-Cadmore | Jos Buttler; Kunal Singh Rathore; Donovan Ferreira | Ravichandran Ashwin; Tanush Kotian; Abid Mushtaq | Avesh Khan; Kuldeep Sen; Navdeep Saini; Trent Boult; Nandre Burger | Yuzvendra Chahal; Keshav Maharaj; Adam Zampa |

=== Auction ===
The season's auction took place on 24 and 25 November 2024 in Jeddah, Saudi Arabia. The auction purse for each franchise was set at ₹120 crore (US$12 million), with the franchises being deducted an amount from the purse for each retained player. Rajasthan had a purse remaining of ₹41 crore (US$4.3 million). Franchises that did not retain six players, were allowed Right-to-Match (RTM) cards at the auction for each player not retained. Rajasthan had no cards left. Rajasthan bought fourteen players in the auction, including seven capped players and five overseas players.

== Squad ==
- Players with international caps as of start of 2025 IPL are listed in **bold**.
- Ages are as of 22 March 2025.
- Withdrawn players are indicated by a dagger symbol (†) and placed at the bottom of the table.

Rajasthan Royals squad for the 2025 Indian Premier League
| S/N | Name | Nationality | Birth date | Batting style | Bowling style | Salary | Notes |
|---|---|---|---|---|---|---|---|
| 5 | **Riyan Parag** | India | 10 November 2001 (aged 23) | Right-handed | Right-arm leg break | ₹14 crore (US$1.5 million) | Stand-in captain (Note: Riyan Parag captained Rajasthan Royals for the first 3 games, and in later games when Sanju Samson was unavailable.) |
| 11 | **Sanju Samson** | India | 11 November 1994 (aged 30) | Right-handed | Right-arm off break | ₹18 crore (US$1.9 million) | Captain |
| 12 | Vaibhav Sooryavanshi | India | 27 March 2011 (aged 13) | Left-handed | Left-arm orthodox | ₹1.1 crore (US$110,000) | |
| 14 | Kunal Singh Rathore | India | 9 October 2002 (aged 22) | Left-handed | Right-arm off break | ₹30 lakh (US$31,000) | |
| 21 | **Dhruv Jurel** | India | 21 January 2001 (aged 24) | Right-handed | Right-arm medium-fast | ₹14 crore (US$1.5 million) | |
| 22 | **Jofra Archer** | England | 1 April 1995 (aged 29) | Right-handed | Right-arm fast | ₹12.5 crore (US$1.3 million) | Overseas |
| 24 | **Tushar Deshpande** | India | 15 May 1995 (aged 29) | Left-handed | Right-arm medium-fast | ₹6.5 crore (US$670,000) | |
| 25 | Akash Madhwal | India | 25 November 1993 (aged 31) | Right-handed | Right-arm medium-fast | ₹1.2 crore (US$120,000) | |
| 26 | Kumar Kartikeya | India | 26 December 1997 (aged 27) | Right-handed | Left-arm unorthodox | ₹30 lakh (US$31,000) | |
| 27 | Shubham Dubey | India | 27 August 1994 (aged 30) | Left-handed | Right-arm off break | ₹80 lakh (US$83,000) | |
| 34 | Yudhvir Singh | India | 13 September 1997 (aged 27) | Right-handed | Right-arm medium-fast | ₹35 lakh (US$36,000) | |
| 49 | **Wanindu Hasaranga** | Sri Lanka | 29 July 1997 (aged 27) | Right-handed | Right-arm leg break | ₹5.25 crore (US$550,000) | Overseas |
| 61 | **Maheesh Theekshana** | Sri Lanka | 1 August 2000 (aged 24) | Right-handed | Right-arm off break | ₹4.4 crore (US$460,000) | Overseas |
| 64 | **Yashasvi Jaiswal** | India | 28 December 2001 (aged 23) | Left-handed | Right-arm leg break | ₹18 crore (US$1.9 million) | |
| 83 | **Fazalhaq Farooqi** | Afghanistan | 22 September 2000 (aged 24) | Right-handed | Left-arm medium-fast | ₹2 crore (US$210,000) | Overseas |
| 189 | **Shimron Hetmyer** | West Indies | 26 December 1996 (aged 28) | Left-handed | Right-arm leg break | ₹11 crore (US$1.1 million) | Overseas |
| —N/a | **Nandre Burger** | South Africa | 11 August 1995 (aged 29) | Left-handed | Left-arm fast-medium | ₹3.5 crore (US$360,000) | Overseas; replacement (Note: Nandre Burger replaced Sandeep Sharma, after the latter withdrew due to finger injury.) |
| —N/a | **Kwena Maphaka** | South Africa | 8 April 2006 (aged 18) | Left-handed | Left-arm medium-fast | ₹1.5 crore (US$160,000) | Overseas |
| —N/a | Lhuan-dre Pretorius | South Africa | 28 March 2006 (aged 18) | Left-handed | —N/a | ₹30 lakh (US$31,000) | Overseas; replacement (Note: Lhuan-dre Pretorius replaced Nitish Rana, after the latter withdrew due to calf injury.) |
| —N/a | Ashok Sharma | India | 17 June 2002 (aged 22) | Right-handed | Right-arm medium-fast | ₹30 lakh (US$31,000) | |
| 20 | **Sandeep Sharma** † | India | 18 May 1993 (aged 31) | Right-handed | Right-arm medium-fast | ₹4 crore (US$420,000) | Withdrawn |
| 36 | **Nitish Rana** † | India | 27 December 1993 (aged 31) | Left-handed | Right-arm off break | ₹4.2 crore (US$440,000) | Withdrawn |

== Support staff ==
In September 2024, it was announced that Rahul Dravid would replace Kumar Sangakkara as Rajasthan's head coach, while Vikram Rathour would join as batting coach.

| Position | Name |
|---|---|
| Head coach | Rahul Dravid |
| Batting coach | Vikram Rathour |
| Bowling coach | Sairaj Bahutule |

- Source: Wisden

== League stage ==
Rajasthan Royals began their season with two defeats against Sunrisers Hyderabad and Kolkata Knight Riders. They won the next two matches against Chennai Super Kings and Punjab Kings; but lost the next five matches against Gujarat Titans, Royal Challengers Bengaluru, Delhi Capitals, Lucknow Super Giants and Bengaluru. They won their tenth match against Gujarat with their player Vaibhav Sooryavanshi becoming the youngest and the fastest Indian player to score a century in the IPL. Following a 100-run defeat against Mumbai Indians, they were eliminated from the 2025 IPL. They lost the next two matches against Kolkata and Punjab; but won in their last match of the season against Chennai.

=== Points table ===
League stage standings
| Pos | Grp | Team | Pld | W | L | NR | Pts | NRR | Qualification |
|---|---|---|---|---|---|---|---|---|---|
| 1 | A | Punjab Kings | 14 | 9 | 4 | 1 | 19 | 0.372 | Advance to Qualifier 1 |
| 2 | A | Royal Challengers Bengaluru | 14 | 9 | 4 | 1 | 19 | 0.301 | Advance to Qualifier 1 |
| 3 | B | Gujarat Titans | 14 | 9 | 5 | 0 | 18 | 0.254 | Advance to Eliminator |
| 4 | B | Mumbai Indians | 14 | 8 | 6 | 0 | 16 | 1.142 | Advance to Eliminator |
| 5 | B | Delhi Capitals | 14 | 7 | 6 | 1 | 15 | −0.011 | Eliminated |
| 6 | B | Sunrisers Hyderabad | 14 | 6 | 7 | 1 | 13 | −0.241 | Eliminated |
| 7 | B | Lucknow Super Giants | 14 | 6 | 8 | 0 | 12 | −0.376 | Eliminated |
| 8 | A | Kolkata Knight Riders | 14 | 5 | 7 | 2 | 12 | −0.305 | Eliminated |
| 9 | A | Rajasthan Royals | 14 | 4 | 10 | 0 | 8 | −0.549 | Eliminated |
| 10 | A | Chennai Super Kings | 14 | 4 | 10 | 0 | 8 | −0.647 | Eliminated |

Source: ESPNcricinfo

=== League progression ===
League progression
| Team | Group matches | | | | | | | | | | | | | | Playoffs | | |
| Team | 1 | 2 | 3 | 4 | 5 | 6 | 7 | 8 | 9 | 10 | 11 | 12 | 13 | 14 | Q1/E | Q2 | F |
|---|---|---|---|---|---|---|---|---|---|---|---|---|---|---|---|---|---|
| Rajasthan Royals | 0 | 0 | 2 | 4 | 4 | 4 | 4 | 4 | 4 | 6 | 6 | 6 | 6 | 8 | | | |

| Win | Loss | No result |

- Note: The total points at the end of each group match are listed.
- Note: Click on the points (group matches) or W/L (playoffs) to see the match summary.

=== Fixtures ===
Match 2
23 March 2025
15:30 (D/N)
Scorecard

| Sunrisers Hyderabad (H); 286/6 (20 overs) | v | Rajasthan Royals; 242/6 (20 overs) |
| Ishan Kishan 106* (47); Tushar Deshpande 3/44 (4 overs) | | Dhruv Jurel 70 (35); Harshal Patel 2/34 (4 overs) |

Sunrisers Hyderabad won by 44 runs
Rajiv Gandhi International Cricket Stadium, Hyderabad
Umpires: Adrian Holdstock (SA) and Akshay Totre (Ind)
Player of the match: Ishan Kishan (Sunrisers Hyderabad)

- Rajasthan Royals won the toss and elected to field.
- Aniket Verma (Sunrisers Hyderabad) made his IPL debut.

Match 6
26 March 2025
19:30 (N)
Scorecard

| Rajasthan Royals (H); 151/9 (20 overs) | v | Kolkata Knight Riders; 153/2 (17.3 overs) |
| Dhruv Jurel 33 (28); Varun Chakravarthy 2/17 (4 overs) | | Quinton de Kock 97* (61); Wanindu Hasaranga 1/34 (3 overs) |

Kolkata Knight Riders won by 8 wickets
ACA Cricket Stadium, Guwahati
Umpires: Rohan Pandit (Ind) and Akshay Totre (Ind)
Player of the match: Quinton de Kock (Kolkata Knight Riders)

- Kolkata Knight Riders won the toss and elected to field.

Match 11
30 March 2025
19:30 (N)
Scorecard

| Rajasthan Royals (H); 182/9 (20 overs) | v | Chennai Super Kings; 176/6 (20 overs) |
| Nitish Rana 81 (36); Noor Ahmad 2/28 (4 overs); Matheesha Pathirana 2/28 (4 overs) | | Ruturaj Gaikwad 63 (44); Wanindu Hasaranga 4/35 (4 overs) |

Rajasthan Royals won by 6 runs
ACA Cricket Stadium, Guwahati
Umpires: Adrian Holdstock (SA) and Akshay Totre (Ind)
Player of the match: Nitish Rana (Rajasthan Royals)

- Chennai Super Kings won the toss and elected to field.

Match 18
5 April 2025
19:30 (N)
Scorecard

| Rajasthan Royals; 205/4 (20 overs) | v | Punjab Kings (H); 155/9 (20 overs) |
| Yashasvi Jaiswal 67 (45); Lockie Ferguson 2/37 (4 overs) | | Nehal Wadhera 62 (41); Jofra Archer 3/25 (4 overs) |

Rajasthan Royals won by 50 runs
Maharaja Yadavindra Singh International Cricket Stadium, Mullanpur
Umpires: Ulhas Gandhe (Ind) and Kannur Swaroopanand (Ind)
Player of the match: Jofra Archer (Rajasthan Royals)

- Punjab Kings won the toss and elected to field.

Match 23
9 April 2025
19:30 (N)
Scorecard

| Gujarat Titans (H); 217/6 (20 overs) | v | Rajasthan Royals; 159 (19.2 overs) |
| Sai Sudharsan 82 (53); Tushar Deshpande 2/53 (4 overs) | | Shimron Hetmyer 52 (32); Prasidh Krishna 3/24 (4 overs) |

Gujarat Titans won by 58 runs
Narendra Modi Stadium, Ahmedabad
Umpires: Rohan Pandit (Ind) and Akshay Totre (Ind)
Player of the match: Sai Sudharsan (Gujarat Titans)

- Rajasthan Royals won the toss and elected to field.

Match 28
13 April 2025
15:30 (D/N)
Scorecard

| Rajasthan Royals (H); 173/4 (20 overs) | v | Royal Challengers Bengaluru; 175/1 (17.3 overs) |
| Yashasvi Jaiswal 75 (47); Josh Hazlewood 1/26 (3 overs) | | Phil Salt 65 (33); Kumar Kartikeya 1/25 (3 overs) |

Royal Challengers Bengaluru won by 9 wickets
Sawai Mansingh Stadium, Jaipur
Umpires: Saidharshan Kumar (Ind) and Nitin Menon (Ind)
Player of the match: Phil Salt (Royal Challengers Bengaluru)

- Royal Challengers Bengaluru won the toss and elected to field.

Match 32
16 April 2025
19:30 (N)
Scorecard

| Delhi Capitals (H); 188/5 (20 overs) | v | Rajasthan Royals; 188/4 (20 overs) |
| Abhishek Porel 49 (37); Jofra Archer 2/32 (4 overs) | | Nitish Rana 51 (28); Axar Patel 1/23 (3 overs) |

Match tied
(Delhi Capitals won the Super Over)
Arun Jaitley Stadium, Delhi
Umpires: Keyur Kelkar (Ind) and Akshay Totre (Ind)
Player of the match: Mitchell Starc (Delhi Capitals)

- Rajasthan Royals won the toss and elected to field.
- Super Over: Rajasthan Royals 11/2 (0.5 overs), Delhi Capitals 13/0 (0.4 overs)

Match 36
19 April 2025
19:30 (N)
Scorecard

| Lucknow Super Giants; 180/5 (20 overs) | v | Rajasthan Royals (H); 178/5 (20 overs) |
| Aiden Markram 66 (45); Wanindu Hasaranga 2/31 (4 overs) | | Yashasvi Jaiswal 74 (52); Avesh Khan 3/37 (4 overs) |

Lucknow Super Giants won by 2 runs
Sawai Mansingh Stadium, Jaipur
Umpires: Jayaraman Madanagopal (Ind) and Vinod Seshan (Ind)
Player of the match: Avesh Khan (Lucknow Super Giants)

- Lucknow Super Giants won the toss and elected to bat.
- Vaibhav Sooryavanshi (Rajasthan Royals) became the youngest player to make IPL debut.

Match 42
24 April 2025
19:30 (N)
Scorecard

| Royal Challengers Bengaluru (H); 205/5 (20 overs) | v | Rajasthan Royals; 194/9 (20 overs) |
| Virat Kohli 70 (42); Sandeep Sharma 2/45 (4 overs) | | Yashasvi Jaiswal 49 (19); Josh Hazlewood 4/33 (4 overs) |

Royal Challengers Bengaluru won by 11 runs
M. Chinnaswamy Stadium, Bengaluru
Umpires: Ulhas Gandhe (Ind) and Michael Gough (Eng)
Player of the match: Josh Hazlewood (Royal Challengers Bengaluru)

- Rajasthan Royals won the toss and elected to field.

Match 47
28 April 2025
19:30 (N)
Scorecard

| Gujarat Titans; 209/4 (20 overs) | v | Rajasthan Royals (H); 212/2 (15.5 overs) |
| Shubman Gill 84 (50); Maheesh Theekshana 2/35 (4 overs) | | Vaibhav Sooryavanshi 101 (38); Rashid Khan 1/24 (4 overs) |

Rajasthan Royals won by 8 wickets
Sawai Mansingh Stadium, Jaipur
Umpires: Michael Gough (Eng) and Virender Sharma (Ind)
Player of the match: Vaibhav Sooryavanshi (Rajasthan Royals)

- Rajasthan Royals won the toss and elected to field.
- Karim Janat (Gujarat Titans) made his IPL debut.
- Vaibhav Sooryavanshi (Rajasthan Royals) became the youngest player to score a century in IPL history.

Match 50
1 May 2025
19:30 (N)
Scorecard

| Mumbai Indians; 217/2 (20 overs) | v | Rajasthan Royals (H); 117 (16.1 overs) |
| Ryan Rickelton 61 (38); Riyan Parag 1/12 (2 overs) | | Jofra Archer 30 (27); Karn Sharma 3/23 (4 overs) |

Mumbai Indians won by 100 runs
Sawai Mansingh Stadium, Jaipur
Umpires: Parashar Joshi (Ind) and Vinod Seshan (Ind)
Player of the match: Ryan Rickelton (Mumbai Indians)

- Rajasthan Royals won the toss and elected to field.
- Rajasthan Royals were eliminated as a result of this match.

Match 53
4 May 2025
15:30 (D/N)
Scorecard

| Kolkata Knight Riders (H); 206/4 (20 overs) | v | Rajasthan Royals; 205/8 (20 overs) |
| Andre Russell 57* (25); Riyan Parag 1/21 (3 overs) | | Riyan Parag 95 (45); Varun Chakravarthy 2/32 (4 overs) |

Kolkata Knight Riders won by 1 run
Eden Gardens, Kolkata
Umpires: Rohan Pandit (Ind) and Anish Sahasrabudhe (Ind)
Player of the match: Andre Russell (Kolkata Knight Riders)

- Kolkata Knight Riders won the toss and elected to bat.

Match 59
18 May 2025
15:30 (D/N)
Scorecard

| Punjab Kings; 219/5 (20 overs) | v | Rajasthan Royals (H); 209/7 (20 overs) |
| Nehal Wadhera 70 (37); Tushar Deshpande 2/37 (4 overs) | | Dhruv Jurel 53 (31); Harpreet Brar 3/22 (4 overs) |

Punjab Kings won by 10 runs
Sawai Mansingh Stadium, Jaipur
Umpires: Abhijeet Bengeri (Ind) and Chris Gaffaney (NZ)
Player of the match: Harpreet Brar (Punjab Kings)

- Punjab Kings won the toss and elected to bat.
- This match was originally scheduled for 16 May at the same venue, before being rescheduled.
- Mitchell Owen (Punjab Kings) made his IPL debut.

Match 62
20 May 2025
19:30 (N)
Scorecard

| Chennai Super Kings (H); 187/8 (20 overs) | v | Rajasthan Royals; 188/4 (17.1 overs) |
| Ayush Mhatre 43 (20); Akash Madhwal 3/29 (4 overs) | | Vaibhav Sooryavanshi 57 (33); Ravichandran Ashwin 2/41 (4 overs) |

Rajasthan Royals won by 6 wickets
Arun Jaitley Stadium, Delhi
Umpires: Keyur Kelkar (Ind) and Rohan Pandit (Ind)
Player of the match: Akash Madhwal (Rajasthan Royals)

- Rajasthan Royals won the toss and elected to field.
- This match was originally scheduled for 12 May at the M. A. Chidambaram Stadium, before being rescheduled.

== Statistics ==
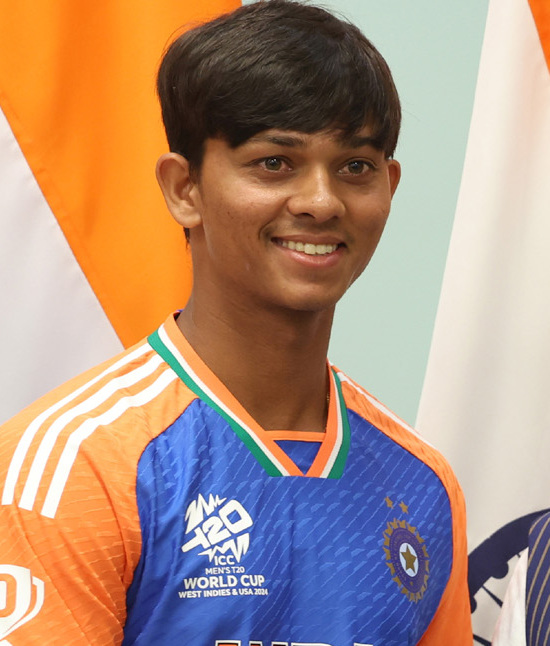
Yashasvi Jaiswal scored the most runs (559) for Rajasthan Royals in the 2025 Indian Premier League.

At the IPL end of season awards, Sooryavanshi was awarded for the highest batting strike rate in the season.

Most runs
| Runs | Player |
|---|---|
| 559 | Yashasvi Jaiswal |
| 393 | Riyan Parag |
| 333 | Dhruv Jurel |
| 285 | Sanju Samson |
| 252 | Vaibhav Sooryavanshi |

Most wickets
| Wickets | Player |
|---|---|
| 11 | Wanindu Hasaranga |
| 11 | Jofra Archer |
| 11 | Maheesh Theekshana |
| 9 | Sandeep Sharma |
| 9 | Tushar Deshpande |
