= 2026 Chennai Super Kings season =

Indian Premier League cricket team

Chennai Super Kings
2026 season
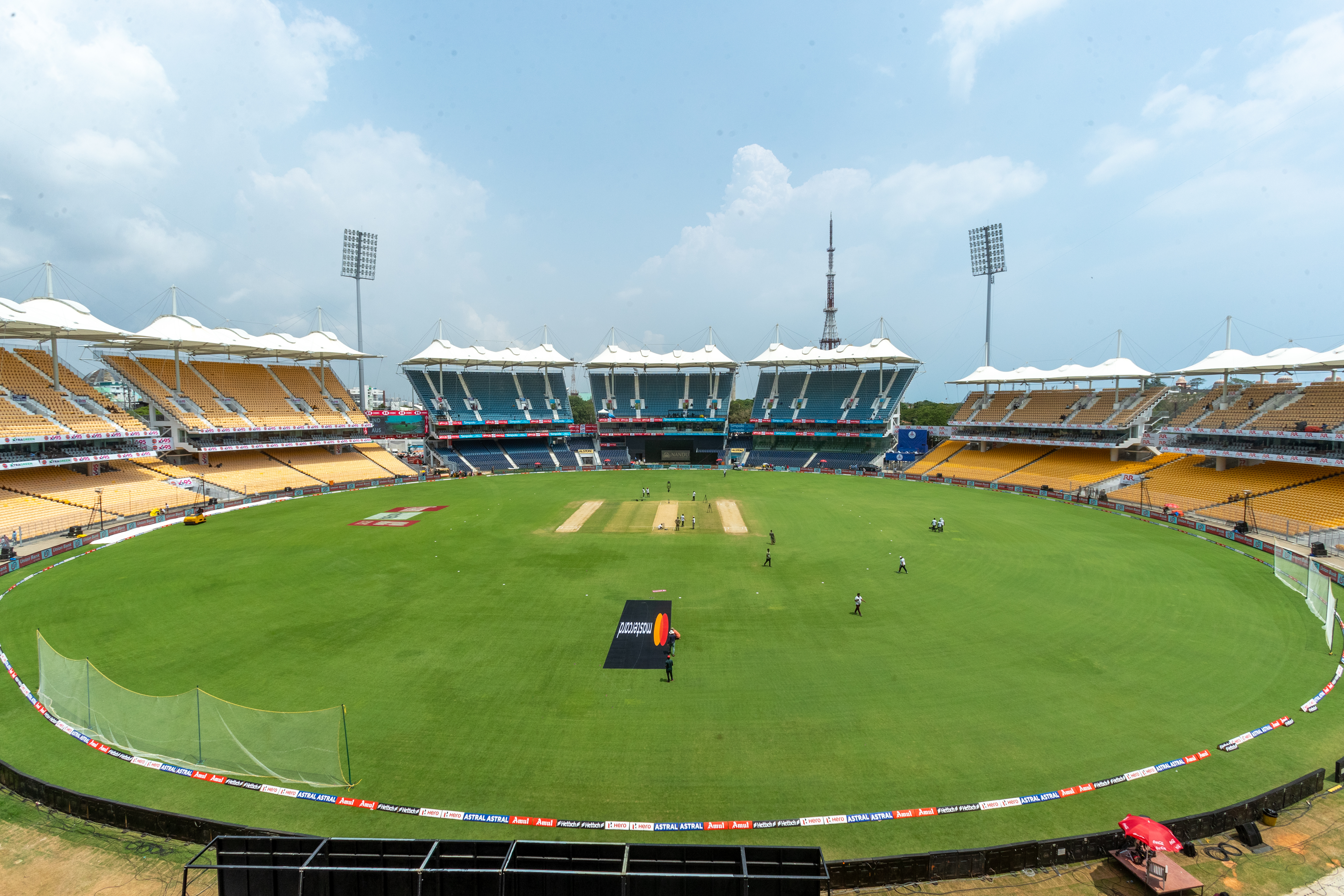
- M. A. Chidambaram Stadium, home ground of Chennai Super Kings
- Coach: Stephen Fleming
- Captain: Ruturaj Gaikwad
- Ground(s): M. A. Chidambaram Stadium, Chennai
- League stage: 8th place
- Most runs: Sanju Samson (477)
- Most wickets: Anshul Kamboj (21)
- Most catches: Dewald Brevis (12)
- Most wicket-keeping dismissals: Sanju Samson (6)

The 2026 season was Chennai Super Kings' seventeenth appearance in the Indian Premier League (IPL). They were one of the ten cricket teams that competed in the 2026 IPL. The team was captained by Ruturaj Gaikwad and coached by Stephen Fleming.

Chennai Super Kings were the third team to be eliminated from the 2026 IPL and finished the season in eighth place with six wins from 14 matches. Sanju Samson scored the most runs (477) while Anshul Kamboj took the most wickets (21) for Chennai in the 2026 season.

== Pre-season ==
The 2026 Indian Premier League was the 19th edition of the Indian Premier League (IPL), a professional Twenty20 (T20) cricket league held in India, organised by the Board of Control for Cricket in India (BCCI). Chennai Super Kings are the joint-most successful franchise with 5 title wins. The team finished in tenth place in the previous season. The tournament featured ten teams competing in 74 matches from 28 March to 31 May 2026. Chennai played all their home matches at M. A. Chidambaram Stadium. Chennai's matches against Gujarat Titans (match 37 and match 66) were switched venues due to the 2026 Gujarat local elections.

=== Player retention ===
Franchises were allowed to retain any number of players from their squad, including traded players while excluding players signed as temporary replacements. Franchises were required to submit their retention lists before 15 November 2025. Chennai retained sixteen players, including captain Ruturaj Gaikwad and former captain MS Dhoni. Chennai also traded their former captain Ravindra Jadeja along with Sam Curran to Rajasthan Royals in return for Sanju Samson.

Retained players
Domestic		Overseas
Khaleel Ahmed; Mukesh Choudhary; MS Dhoni; Shivam Dube; Ruturaj Gaikwad; Ramakrishna Ghosh	Shreyas Gopal; Anshul Kamboj; Ayush Mhatre; Urvil Patel; Sanju Samson (Note: Chennai Super Kings traded Ravindra Jadeja and Sam Curran to Rajasthan Royals in return for Sanju Samson.); Gurjapneet Singh	Noor Ahmad; Dewald Brevis; Nathan Ellis; Jamie Overton

Released players
Batters	Wicket-keepers	All-rounders	Bowlers
Shaik Rasheed; Andre Siddarth; Rahul Tripathi	Vansh Bedi; Devon Conway	Ravichandran Ashwin (Note: Ravichandran Ashwin announced his retirement from IPL in August 2025.); Sam Curran; Deepak Hooda; Ravindra Jadeja; Rachin Ravindra; Vijay Shankar	Kamlesh Nagarkoti; Matheesha Pathirana

=== Auction ===
The season's auction took place on 16 December 2025 in Abu Dhabi, United Arab Emirates. The auction purse for each franchise was set at ₹125 crore (US$13 million), with franchises being deducted an amount from the purse for every retained player. Chennai had a purse remaining of ₹43.4 crore (US$4.5 million). Chennai bought nine players in the auction, including six capped players and four overseas players.

Auctioned players
Domestic		Overseas	
Capped	Uncapped	Capped	Uncapped
Rahul Chahar; Sarfaraz Khan	Aman Khan; Kartik Sharma; Prashant Veer	Zak Foulkes; Matt Henry; Akeal Hosein; Matthew Short	—N/a

== Squad ==
- Players with international caps as of start of 2026 IPL are listed in **bold**.
- Ages are as of 28 March 2026.
- Withdrawn players are indicated by a dagger symbol (†) and placed at the bottom of the table.

Chennai Super Kings squad for the 2026 Indian Premier League
S/N	Name	Nationality	Birth date	Batting style	Bowling style	Salary	Notes
2	**Matthew Short**	Australia	8 November 1995 (aged 30)	Right-handed	Right-arm off break	₹1.5 crore (US$160,000)	Overseas
7	**MS Dhoni**	India	7 July 1981 (aged 44)	Right-handed	Right-arm medium	₹4 crore (US$420,000)	
9	Gurjapneet Singh	India	8 November 1998 (aged 27)	Right-handed	Left-arm fast-medium	₹2.2 crore (US$230,000)	
10	Kuldip Yadav	India	15 October 1996 (aged 29)	Left-handed	Left-arm fast-medium	₹30 lakh (US$31,000)	Replacement (Note: Kuldip Yadav replaced Khaleel Ahmed, after the latter withdrew due to quadriceps injury.)
11	**Sanju Samson**	India	11 November 1994 (aged 31)	Right-handed	—N/a	₹18 crore (US$1.9 million)	
12	**Dewald Brevis**	South Africa	29 April 2003 (aged 22)	Right-handed	Right-arm leg spin	₹2.2 crore (US$230,000)	Overseas
13	Prashant Veer	India	24 November 2005 (aged 20)	Left-handed	Left-arm slow orthodox	₹14.2 crore (US$1.5 million)	
14	**Dian Forrester**	South Africa	7 June 2000 (aged 25)	Left-handed	Right-arm fast-medium	₹75 lakh (US$78,000)	Overseas; replacement (Note: Dian Forrester replaced Jamie Overton, after the latter withdrew due to thigh injury.)
15	**Noor Ahmad**	Afghanistan	3 January 2005 (aged 21)	Right-handed	Left-arm wrist-spin	₹10 crore (US$1.0 million)	Overseas
16	Akash Madhwal	India	25 November 1993 (aged 32)	Right-handed	Right-arm fast-medium	₹30 lakh (US$31,000)	Replacement (Note: Akash Madhwal replaced Ayush Mhatre, after the latter withdrew due to hamstring injury.)
17	**Rahul Chahar**	India	4 August 1999 (aged 26)	Right-handed	Right-arm leg spin	₹5.2 crore (US$540,000)	
19	Shreyas Gopal	India	4 September 1993 (aged 32)	Right-handed	Right-arm leg spin	₹30 lakh (US$31,000)	
21	**Akeal Hosein**	West Indies	25 April 1993 (aged 32)	Left-handed	Left-arm slow orthodox	₹2 crore (US$210,000)	Overseas
23	Aman Hakim Khan	India	23 November 1996 (aged 29)	Right-handed	Right-arm fast-medium	₹40 lakh (US$42,000)	
24	**Matt Henry**	New Zealand	14 December 1991 (aged 34)	Right-handed	Right-arm fast-medium	₹2 crore (US$210,000)	Overseas
25	**Shivam Dube**	India	26 June 1993 (aged 32)	Left-handed	Right-arm medium	₹12 crore (US$1.2 million)	
26	Kartik Sharma	India	26 April 2006 (aged 19)	Right-handed	—N/a	₹14.2 crore (US$1.5 million)	
27	Macneil Noronha	India	23 September 2001 (aged 24)	Right-handed	Right-arm off break	₹30 lakh (US$31,000)	Replacement (Note: Macneil Noronha replaced Ramakrishna Ghosh, after the latter withdrew due to foot fracture.)
31	**Ruturaj Gaikwad**	India	31 January 1997 (aged 29)	Right-handed	Right-arm off break	₹18 crore (US$1.9 million)	Captain
35	**Zak Foulkes**	New Zealand	5 June 2002 (aged 23)	Right-handed	Right-arm fast-medium	₹75 lakh (US$78,000)	Overseas
37	Urvil Patel	India	17 October 1998 (aged 27)	Right-handed	—N/a	₹30 lakh (US$31,000)	
45	**Spencer Johnson**	Australia	16 December 1995 (aged 30)	Left-handed	Left-arm fast	₹1.5 crore (US$160,000)	Overseas; replacement (Note: Spencer Johnson replaced Nathan Ellis, after the latter withdrew due to hamstring injury.)
47	**Anshul Kamboj**	India	6 December 2000 (aged 25)	Right-handed	Right-arm fast-medium	₹3.4 crore (US$350,000)	
90	Mukesh Choudhary	India	6 July 1996 (aged 29)	Left-handed	Left-arm fast-medium	₹30 lakh (US$31,000)	
97	**Sarfaraz Khan**	India	22 October 1997 (aged 28)	Right-handed	Right-arm leg spin	₹75 lakh (US$78,000)	
1	Ramakrishna Ghosh †	India	28 August 1997 (aged 28)	Right-handed	Right-arm fast-medium	₹30 lakh (US$31,000)	Withdrawn
56	Ayush Mhatre †	India	16 July 2007 (aged 18)	Right-handed	Right-arm off break	₹30 lakh (US$31,000)	Withdrawn
71	**Khaleel Ahmed** †	India	5 December 1997 (aged 28)	Right-handed	Left-arm fast-medium	₹4.8 crore (US$500,000)	Withdrawn
72	**Nathan Ellis** †	Australia	22 September 1994 (aged 31)	Right-handed	Right-arm fast-medium	₹2 crore (US$210,000)	Overseas; withdrawn
88	**Jamie Overton** †	England	10 April 1994 (aged 31)	Right-handed	Right-arm fast-medium	₹1.5 crore (US$160,000)	Overseas; withdrawn

== Support staff ==
Sridharan Sriram joined the squad as a bowling coach.

Position	Name
Head coach	Stephen Fleming
Batting coach	Michael Hussey
Bowling coach	Eric Simons; Sridharan Sriram
Fielding coach	Rajiv Kumar

- Source: News18

== League stage ==
Chennai Super Kings began their season with consecutive losses to Rajasthan, Punjab Kings, and Royal Challengers Bengaluru. They won their next two matches against Delhi Capitals and Kolkata Knight Riders, lost to Sunrisers Hyderabad, won against Mumbai Indians, and lost to Gujarat. They won their next three matches against Mumbai, Delhi and Lucknow Super Giants but lost their last three matches of the season to Lucknow, Hyderabad, and Gujarat. They finished league stage at the eighth place with twelve points and were eliminated from the 2026 IPL. This was the first year since the IPL's inauguration in 2008 where MS Dhoni did not play any matches.

=== Points table ===
League stage standings
Pos	Grp	Team	Pld	W	L	NR	Pts	NRR	Qualification
1	A	Royal Challengers Bengaluru (C)	14	9	5	0	18	0.783	Advanced to Qualifier 1
2	B	Gujarat Titans (R)	14	9	5	0	18	0.695	Advanced to Qualifier 1
3	B	Sunrisers Hyderabad (4th)	14	9	5	0	18	0.524	Advanced to Eliminator
4	A	Rajasthan Royals (3rd)	14	8	6	0	16	0.189	Advanced to Eliminator
5	A	Punjab Kings	14	7	6	1	15	0.309	Eliminated
6	B	Delhi Capitals	14	7	7	0	14	−0.651	Eliminated
7	A	Kolkata Knight Riders	14	6	7	1	13	−0.147	Eliminated
8	A	Chennai Super Kings	14	6	8	0	12	−0.345	Eliminated
9	B	Mumbai Indians	14	4	10	0	8	−0.584	Eliminated
10	B	Lucknow Super Giants	14	4	10	0	8	−0.740	Eliminated

Source: ESPNcricinfo
Rules for classification: 1) Points; 2) Wins; 3) Net run rate; 4) Wickets taken per fair deliveries; 5) drawing lots
(C) Champions; (R) Runners-up

=== League progression ===
League progression
Team	Group matches														Playoffs		
Team	1	2	3	4	5	6	7	8	9	10	11	12	13	14	Q1/E	Q2	F
Chennai Super Kings	0	0	0	2	4	4	6	6	8	10	12	12	12	12			

Win	Loss	No result

- Note: The total points at the end of each group match are listed.
- Note: Click on the points (group matches) or W/L (playoffs) to see the match summary.

=== Fixtures ===
Match 3
30 March 2026
19:30 (N)
Scorecard

Chennai Super Kings; 127 (19.4 overs)	v	Rajasthan Royals (H); 128/2 (12.1 overs)
Jamie Overton 43 (36); Ravindra Jadeja 2/18 (3 overs)		Vaibhav Sooryavanshi 52 (17); Anshul Kamboj 2/27 (3 overs)

Rajasthan Royals won by 8 wickets
ACA Cricket Stadium, Guwahati
Umpires: Kumar Dharmasena (SL) and Mohit Krishnadas (Ind)
Player of the match: Nandre Burger (Rajasthan Royals)

- Rajasthan Royals won the toss and elected to field.
- Brijesh Sharma (Rajasthan Royals) made his T20 debut.
- Kartik Sharma (Chennai Super Kings) made his IPL debut.

Match 7
3 April 2026
19:30 (N)
Scorecard

Chennai Super Kings (H); 209/5 (20 overs)	v	Punjab Kings; 210/5 (18.4 overs)
Ayush Mhatre 73 (43); Vijaykumar Vyshak 2/38 (4 overs)		Shreyas Iyer 50 (29); Anshul Kamboj 2/43 (3.4 overs)

Punjab Kings won by 5 wickets
M. A. Chidambaram Stadium, Chennai
Umpires: Abhijit Bhattacharya (Ind) and Akshay Totre (Ind)
Player of the match: Priyansh Arya (Punjab Kings)

- Punjab Kings won the toss and elected to field.

Match 11
5 April 2026
19:30 (N)
Scorecard

Royal Challengers Bengaluru (H); 250/3 (20 overs)	v	Chennai Super Kings; 207 (19.4 overs)
Tim David 70* (25); Shivam Dube 1/30 (2 overs)		Sarfaraz Khan 50 (25); Bhuvneshwar Kumar 3/41 (4 overs)

Royal Challengers Bengaluru won by 43 runs
M. Chinnaswamy Stadium, Bengaluru
Umpires: K. N. Ananthapadmanabhan (Ind) and Akshay Totre (Ind)
Player of the match: Tim David (Royal Challengers Bengaluru)

- Chennai Super Kings won the toss and elected to field.
- Tim David (Royal Challengers Bengaluru) scored his 400th six in T20s.
- Bhuvneshwar Kumar (Royal Challengers Bengaluru) became the first fast bowler to take 200 wickets in IPL.

Match 18
11 April 2026
19:30 (N)
Scorecard

Chennai Super Kings (H); 212/2 (20 overs)	v	Delhi Capitals; 189 (20 overs)
Sanju Samson 115* (56); Axar Patel 1/39 (4 overs)		Tristan Stubbs 60 (38); Jamie Overton 4/18 (4 overs)

Chennai Super Kings won by 23 runs
M. A. Chidambaram Stadium, Chennai
Umpires: Saidarshan Kumar (Ind) and Vinod Seshan (Ind)
Player of the match: Sanju Samson (Chennai Super Kings)

- Delhi Capitals won the toss and elected to field.
- Sanju Samson (Chennai Super Kings) scored his 400th six in T20s.

Match 22
14 April 2026
19:30 (N)
Scorecard

Chennai Super Kings (H); 192/5 (20 overs)	v	Kolkata Knight Riders; 160/7 (20 overs)
Sanju Samson 48 (32); Kartik Tyagi 2/35 (4 overs)		Ramandeep Singh 35 (23); Noor Ahmad 3/21 (4 overs)

Chennai Super Kings won by 32 runs
M. A. Chidambaram Stadium, Chennai
Umpires: Nitin Menon (Ind) and Saidharshan Kumar (Ind)
Player of the match: Noor Ahmad (Chennai Super Kings)

- Kolkata Knight Riders won the toss and elected to field.

Match 27
18 April 2026
19:30 (N)
Scorecard

Sunrisers Hyderabad (H); 194/9 (20 overs)	v	Chennai Super Kings; 184/8 (20 overs)
Abhishek Sharma 59 (22); Anshul Kamboj 3/22 (3 overs)		Matthew Short 34 (30); Eshan Malinga 3/29 (4 overs)

Sunrisers Hyderabad won by 10 runs
Rajiv Gandhi Stadium, Hyderabad
Umpires: Anish Sahasrabudhe (Ind) and Vinod Seshan (Ind)
Player of the match: Eshan Malinga (Sunrisers Hyderabad)

- Chennai Super Kings won the toss and elected to field.

Match 33
23 April 2026
19:30 (N)
Scorecard

Chennai Super Kings; 207/6 (20 overs)	v	Mumbai Indians (H); 104 (19 overs)
Sanju Samson 101* (54); Allah Ghazanfar 2/25 (4 overs)		Tilak Varma 37 (29); Akeal Hosein 4/17 (4 overs)

Chennai Super Kings won by 103 runs
Wankhede Stadium, Mumbai
Umpires: Adrian Holdstock (SA) and Parashar Joshi (Ind)
Player of the match: Sanju Samson (Chennai Super Kings)

- Mumbai Indians won the toss and elected to field.
- Shardul Thakur replaced Mitchell Santner as a concussion substitute after the latter got injured during the first innings.
- This was Mumbai Indians' biggest defeat by a margin of runs.

Match 37
26 April 2026
15:30 (D/N)
Scorecard

Chennai Super Kings (H); 158/7 (20 overs)	v	Gujarat Titans; 162/2 (16.4 overs)
Ruturaj Gaikwad 74* (60); Kagiso Rabada 3/25 (4 overs)		Sai Sudharsan 87 (46); Noor Ahmad 1/29 (4 overs)

Gujarat Titans won by 8 wickets
M. A. Chidambaram Stadium, Chennai
Umpires: K. N. Ananthapadmanabhan (Ind) and Adrian Holdstock (SA)
Player of the match: Kagiso Rabada (Gujarat Titans)

- Gujarat Titans won the toss and elected to field.
- This match was initially scheduled at Narendra Modi Stadium in Ahmedabad, but was swapped venues with match 66 due to the 2026 Gujarat local elections.

Match 44
2 May 2026
19:30 (N)
Scorecard

Mumbai Indians; 159/7 (20 overs)	v	Chennai Super Kings (H); 160/2 (18.1 overs)
Naman Dhir 57 (37); Anshul Kamboj 3/32 (4 overs)		Ruturaj Gaikwad 67* (47); Jasprit Bumrah 1/20 (3 overs)

Chennai Super Kings won by 8 wickets
M. A. Chidambaram Stadium, Chennai
Umpires: Kaushik Gandhi (Ind) and Nitin Menon (Ind)
Player of the match: Ruturaj Gaikwad (Chennai Super Kings)

- Mumbai Indians won the toss and elected to bat.
- Ramakrishna Ghosh (Chennai Super Kings) and Raghu Sharma (Mumbai Indians) both made their IPL debuts.

Match 48
5 May 2026
19:30 (N)
Scorecard

Delhi Capitals (H); 155/7 (20 overs)	v	Chennai Super Kings; 159/2 (17.3 overs)
Sameer Rizvi 40* (24); Noor Ahmad 2/22 (3 overs)		Sanju Samson 87* (52); Axar Patel 1/25 (4 overs)

Chennai Super Kings won by 8 wickets
Arun Jaitley Stadium, Delhi
Umpires: Kaushik Gandhi (Ind) and Tanmay Srivastava (Ind)
Player of the match: Sanju Samson (Chennai Super Kings)

- Delhi Capitals won the toss and elected to bat.

Match 53
10 May 2026
15:30 (D/N)
Scorecard

Lucknow Super Giants; 203/8 (20 overs)	v	Chennai Super Kings (H); 208/5 (19.2 overs)
Josh Inglis 85 (33); Jamie Overton 3/36 (4 overs)		Urvil Patel 65 (23); Shahbaz Ahmed 2/30 (3 overs)

Chennai Super Kings won by 5 wickets
M. A. Chidambaram Stadium, Chennai
Umpires: Keyur Kelkar (Ind) and Amit Rana (Ind)
Player of the match: Jamie Overton (Chennai Super Kings)

- Chennai Super Kings won the toss and elected to field.
- Lucknow Super Giants were eliminated as a result of this match.

Match 59
15 May 2026
19:30 (N)
Scorecard

Chennai Super Kings; 187/5 (20 overs)	v	Lucknow Super Giants (H); 188/3 (16.4 overs)
Kartik Sharma 71 (42); Akash Singh 3/26 (4 overs)		Mitchell Marsh 90 (38); Mukesh Choudhary 1/24 (3 overs)

Lucknow Super Giants won by 7 wickets
Ekana Cricket Stadium, Lucknow
Umpires: Ulhas Gandhe (Ind) and Tony Ematty (Ind)
Player of the match: Mitchell Marsh (Lucknow Super Giants)

- Lucknow Super Giants won the toss and elected to field.

Match 63
18 May 2026
19:30 (N)
Scorecard

Chennai Super Kings (H); 180/7 (20 overs)	v	Sunrisers Hyderabad; 181/5 (19 overs)
Dewald Brevis 44 (27); Pat Cummins 3/28 (4 overs)		Ishan Kishan 70 (47); Mukesh Choudhary 2/36 (4 overs)

Sunrisers Hyderabad won by 5 wickets
M. A. Chidambaram Stadium, Chennai
Umpires: Nitin Menon (Ind) and Tanmay Srivastava (Ind)
Player of the match: Ishan Kishan (Sunrisers Hyderabad)

- Chennai Super Kings won the toss and elected to bat.
- Sunrisers Hyderabad and Gujarat Titans qualified for the playoffs as a result of this match.

Match 66
21 May 2026
19:30 (N)
Scorecard

Gujarat Titans (H); 229/4 (20 overs)	v	Chennai Super Kings; 140 (13.4 overs)
Sai Sudharsan 84 (53); Mukesh Choudhary 1/36 (4 overs)		Shivam Dube 47 (17); Rashid Khan 3/18 (2 overs)

Gujarat Titans won by 89 runs
Narendra Modi Stadium, Ahmedabad
Umpires: Kaushik Gandhi (Ind) and Nitin Menon (Ind)
Player of the match: Mohammed Siraj (Gujarat Titans)

- Chennai Super Kings won the toss and elected to field.
- This match was initially scheduled at M. A. Chidambaram Stadium in Chennai, but was swapped venues with match 37 due to the 2026 Gujarat local elections.
- Chennai Super Kings were eliminated as a result of this match.

== Statistics ==
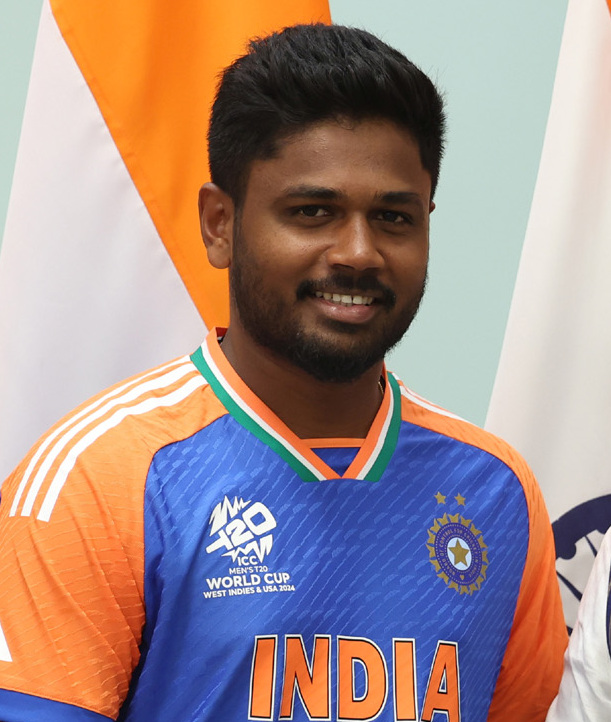
Sanju Samson scored the most runs (477) for Chennai Super Kings in the 2026 Indian Premier League.

Most runs
Runs	Player
477	Sanju Samson
337	Ruturaj Gaikwad
295	Kartik Sharma
270	Shivam Dube
201	Ayush Mhatre

Most wickets
Wickets	Player
21	Anshul Kamboj
14	Jamie Overton
13	Noor Ahmad
8	Akeal Hosein
8	Mukesh Choudhary
