= Dinesh Salunkhe =

Indian cricketer

Personal information
- Born: 12 November 1982 (age 44); Mumbai, Maharashtra, India
- Batting: Right-handed
- Bowling: Legbreak
- Role: Bowler

Domestic team information
- Years: Team
- 2008: Rajasthan Royals

Career statistics
Competition	T20
Matches	6
Runs scored	33
Batting average	16.50
100s/50s	0/0
Top score	26*
Balls bowled	48
Wickets	1
Bowling average	78.00
5 wickets in innings	0
10 wickets in match	0
Best bowling	1/21
Catches/stumpings	2/–
- Source: ESPNcricinfo, 1 March 2025

Dinesh Salunkhe (born 12 November 1982 in Bombay) is an Indian cricketer. He is a right-handed batsman and a leg-break bowler. Played Legend League in 2022. Salunkhe made six appearances for the victorious Rajasthan Royals team in the 2008 Indian Premier League competition. To date all his professional appearances have been in Twenty20 cricket; he has never played first-class cricket.

Salunkhe shot to fame when he was chosen as 'Man of the Series' in their first season of Cricket Star, India's first-ever cricket talent-hunting reality television show. His prize was a scholarship with Leicestershire County Cricket Club for the 2007 English cricket season. During this period, Salunkhe played in some games for Leicestershire Second XI. Upon returning to India he was signed up to play for the Air India cricket team.

== Indian Premier League ==
Dinesh Salunkhe represented the victorious Rajasthan Royals in the inaugural edition of the Indian Premier League in 2008. Salunkhe was a lower-order batsman for the Royals, who impressed with the bat in his debut, scoring 26 runs. He kept up a steady average in the lower order, though he was only twice called up to bowl, capturing just one wicket. Salunkhe was not picked for the semi-final or final of the competition, however, with his final game coming in the last preliminary round match against Kings XI Punjab.

On 15 April 2009, he was axed by Rajasthan Royals, citing his poor form for the omission from the squad for the 2009 season.
