= Sanju Samson =

Indian cricketer (born 1994)

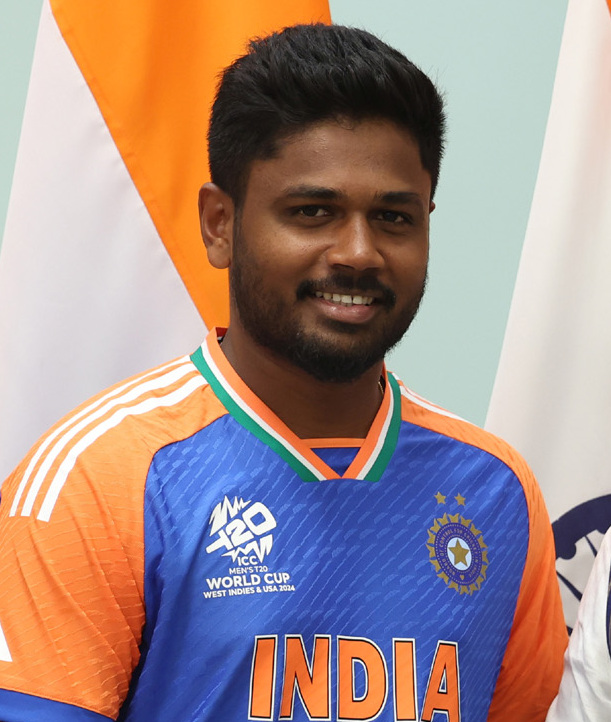
- Sanju in 2024

Personal information
- Full name: Sanju Viswanath Samson
- Born: 11 November 1994 (age 32); Pulluvila, Kerala, India
- Nickname: Chettan
- Height: 1.70 m (5 ft 7 in)
- Batting: Right-handed
- Bowling: Right-arm off-spin
- Role: Wicket-keeper-batter

International information
- National side: India (2015–present)
- ODI debut (cap 241): 23 July 2021 v Sri Lanka
- Last ODI: 21 December 2023 v South Africa
- ODI shirt no.: 9
- T20I debut (cap 55): 19 July 2015 v Zimbabwe
- Last T20I: 1 November 2026 v New Zealand
- T20I shirt no.: 9

Domestic team information
- Years: Team
- 2011–present: Kerala
- 2012: Kolkata Knight Riders
- 2013–2015, 2018–2025: Rajasthan Royals
- 2016–2017: Delhi Daredevils
- 2025: Kochi Blue Tigers
- 2026–present: Chennai Super Kings

Career statistics
Competition	ODI	T20I	FC	LA
Matches	16	82	66	130
Runs scored	510	1,842	3,888	3,599
Batting average	56.66	26.69	39.27	34.27
100s/50s	1/3	3/11	11/17	4/19
Top score	108	111	211	212*
Catches/stumpings	9/2	48/8	94/7	127/15
Medal record
Men's cricket
Representing India
ICC T20 World Cup
Winner	2024 West Indies & USA
Winner	2026 India & Sri Lanka
ACC Asia Cup
Winner	2025 UAE
Asian Games
Gold medal – first place	2026 Aichi-Nagoya
ACC U19 Asia Cup
Winner	2012 Malaysia
Winner	2013–14 UAE
- Source: Cricinfo, 2 November 2026

Sanju Viswanath Samson (Note: /ˌsʌndʒu sæmsən/) (born 11 November 1994) is an Indian cricketer who plays for the India national cricket team in the T20I format. He was part of the 2024 and 2026 T20 World Cup winning teams, including a Player of the Tournament performance in 2026. He plays for Chennai Super Kings in the IPL and for the Kerala cricket team domestically.

Samson started his cricketing career in Delhi and later moved to Kerala. After making an impact in junior cricket, he made his first-class debut for Kerala in 2011. He was the vice-captain of the Indian U19 team for the 2014 U19 Cricket World Cup. He made his Indian Premier League debut in 2013 for Rajasthan Royals and won the Emerging Player of the Year. He scored an unbeaten 212 in the 2019–20 Vijay Hazare Trophy, the sixth time an Indian scored a double-century in List A cricket, which is also the second-fastest double-century in the format. Sanju scored his maiden ODI century in the 3rd ODI in the three-match series against South Africa on 21 December 2023.

== Early life ==
Samson was born on 11 November 1994 into a Malayali Christian family in Pulluvila, a coastal village near Vizhinjam in Thiruvananthapuram district of Kerala. His father, Samson Viswanath, was formerly a police constable at Delhi Police and a retired football player who has represented Delhi in Santosh Trophy and his mother, Ligy Viswanath is a housewife. His elder brother Saly Samson has represented Kerala in junior cricket and currently works in the AG's office.

Samson spent his early childhood in the Police residential colony in North Delhi neighbourhood of GTB Nagar and studied at Rosary Senior Secondary School, Delhi. He was trained under coach Yashpal at the academy in DL DAV Model School, Shalimar Bagh. When he didn't make it into the Delhi U13 team for Dhruv Pandove Trophy, his father took voluntary retirement from the Delhi police force; a year after he retired from football and moved to Kerala, where Samson and his brother continued their cricketing careers. In Kerala, he attended Masters Cricket Club in Thiruvananthapuram before changing academies to train under Biju George on Medical College Ground, Thiruvananthapuram.

Samson graduated high school from St. Joseph's Higher Secondary School, Thiruvananthapuram. He pursued a B.A. degree in English literature from Mar Ivanios College, Thiruvananthapuram.

== Youth and domestic career ==
=== Youth career ===
Samson was a member of the U-13 cricket team of Kerala in 2007. In the KSCA Inter-State under-13 tournament, he captained Kerala and bagged the player of the tournament award scoring 973 runs, including four centuries in five matches at an average of 108.11. As a member of Kerala U-16 team for the 2008–09 Vijay Merchant Trophy, he scored a double century off 138 balls against Goa and finished the tournament as the second-highest run-scorer with 498 runs including two centuries and two fifties. He was also the captain of Kerala in U-16 and U-19 levels.

His performance in the 2010-11 Cooch Behar Trophy earned him a spot in the India U-19 team that played the 2012 ACC Under-19 Asia Cup held in Malaysia in June 2012. His dismal show in the tournament meant that he failed to get selected to India's squad for the 2012 Under-19 Cricket World Cup that followed. He was named vice-captain of India U-19 team for the 2013 Top End Under-19 Series in Australia in June 2013. He scored two half-centuries in India U-19's Youth Test series against Sri Lanka held from July to August 2013. In the 2013 ACC Under 19 Asia cup in UAE, he scored a century in the final against Pakistan, helping India retain the cup. He was also India's vice-captain in the tournament. In January 2014, BCCI appointed Sanju as vice-captain of team India for the 2014 Under-19 Cricket World Cup. He was the top run-scorer for India in the tournament with a highest score of 85 runs from 45 balls against Papua New Guinea.

=== Early domestic career ===
A double-century in the 2008-09 Vijay Merchant Trophy paved way to the Kerala squad for the 2009–10 Ranji Trophy. Then aged 14, he was the youngest Kerala cricketer to be selected to play in Ranji Trophy. He was named in the Kerala squad for the 2009–10 Syed Mushtaq Ali Trophy the same year. He made his first-class debut for the team in the 2011–12 Ranji Trophy on 3 November 2011 against Vidarbha and Twenty20 debut on 16 October 2011 against Hyderabad in the 2011–12 Syed Mushtaq Ali Trophy. He was named in the Kerala squad for playing the 2011-12 Vijay Hazare Trophy and made his List-A debut on 23 February 2012 against Andhra Pradesh in the season.

He scored moderately in the 2012–13 Vijay Hazare Trophy in which Kerala featured in the semi-finals. He scored his maiden first-class century against Himachal Pradesh in the 2012-13 Ranji Trophy, as he scored 127 runs off 207 balls. He was Kerala's highest run-getter in 2013-14 Ranji Trophy season scoring 530 runs at an average of 58.88. In his first match of the 2013–14 season against Assam he scored a career-best 211 to bring up his first double century in Ranji Trophy. In the second match against Andhra Pradesh he scored 115 from 281 balls in the 1st innings followed by 51* in the second innings. He was named in South Zone's squad to play in the 2013–14 Deodhar Trophy in March 2014. On the Australia A Team Quadrangular Series in 2014, he finished as India A's highest run-scorer with 244 runs from seven innings, with an average of 81.33. He scored his second first-class double century in the 2014-15 Ranji Trophy. He was named in South Zone's squad to play in the 2014–15 Deodhar Trophy in November 2014.

=== Inconsistent seasons ===
Samson was appointed as the captain of Kerala for the 2015–16 Ranji Trophy season. Then aged 20, he is the youngest Kerala player to captain the state in Ranji Trophy. He began the season with a ton but failed to convert it into a successful season.

He started the next Ranji season scoring a 154 against Jammu and Kashmir but again failed to impress the rest of the season. He was issued a show-cause notice by Kerala Cricket Association for alleged acts of indiscipline during a match in the tournament.

=== Return to form ===
Samson was the leading run-scorer for Kerala in the 2017–18 Ranji Trophy, with 627 runs from seven matches. In a must-win match against Saurashtra, he scored a 68 in the first innings and smashed a 180 ball 175 in the second innings, helping his team claim a 309 runs victory and quarter-final berth. Kerala went on to play its first quarter-final in Ranji Trophy history in the season with Samson being one of their top performers.

In November 2017, he was appointed as the captain of the Board President's XI, replacing an injured Naman Ojha for a two-day tour match against Sri Lanka. He scored a century against the visiting team ending the match in a draw.

In August 2018, he was one of eight players that were fined by the Kerala Cricket Association, after showing dissent against Kerala's captain, Sachin Baby.

In September 2019, he scored 91 runs off 48 balls in the fifth unofficial List-A match between India A and South Africa A team and was awarded the man-of-the-match award. In October 2019, during the 2019–20 Vijay Hazare Trophy match between Kerala and Goa, Sanju doubled his maiden List-A century. It was the second-fastest double hundred and the fastest by an Indian in the format. It was also the highest total made by a wicket-keeper in a List-A match with an unbeaten 212 runs from 129 balls. His partnership of 338 runs with Kerala skipper Sachin Baby in the match is the highest in List-A cricket for Indian cricket and the third highest in the format. The impact made from this innings went on to earn him a national call-up after four years, as he was selected to play the Bangladesh series that followed.

He was named the captain of Kerala ahead of the 2020–21 Syed Mushtaq Ali Trophy. Kerala played the quarter-finals of the 2021-22 Syed Mushtaq Ali Trophy and 2021-22 Vijay Hazare Trophy under his leadership.

In September 2022, he was named captain of the India A squad playing a 3 ODI-series against New Zealand A cricket team. India whitewashed New Zealand, with Samson being the highest run-getter of the series.

== International career ==
=== Maiden call-up and debut ===
In August 2014, Sanju was selected to India's 17-man squad to play in 5 ODIs and a Twenty20 against England. However, he did not make it to the final eleven in any of the matches and remained a backup keeper to MS Dhoni. In October 2014, he was called to the Twenty20 team to play a solitary T20 against West Indies, which later got cancelled. In December 2014, he was named in India's 30-member probables list for the 2015 Cricket World Cup but did not make to the final squad. In July 2015, he was drafted into the Indian squad against Zimbabwe for an ODI and two T20I matches as an injury replacement for Ambati Rayudu. He made his T20I debut against Zimbabwe at Harare on 19 July 2015. After a top-order collapse, Samson added 36 runs in the sixth wicket, along with Stuart Binny in a low-score chase. India eventually lost the match to Zimbabwe by 10 runs.

=== Comeback and a stop-start career (2019–21) ===
In October 2019, he was recalled to the Indian team after four years as a part of India's Twenty20 International (T20I) squad for their series against Bangladesh; but was benched in the whole series. In November 2019, he was added to the Indian team for T20I series against West Indies after an injury to Shikhar Dhawan. In December 2019, he was named in the Twenty 20 squad to play against Sri Lanka. He featured in the third T20I and was dismissed in the second ball, after hitting the first for a sixer. He was selected for the T20I series of the India tour of New Zealand replacing an injured Shikhar Dhawan but failed to create an impact with the bat with a string of low scores.

"Sanju was fearless at the top of the order. He tried to take the momentum away, he should back himself".

— Virat Kohli on Samson's batting on Team India. —

In October 2020, he was named in India's Twenty20 International (T20I) squad for their series against Australia. On 9 November 2020, he was added to India's One Day International (ODI) squad, also for their series against Australia. He played all the three Twenty20s but flattered to deceive. He was dropped from India's Twenty20 International squad for their next series against England.

In June 2021, he was named in India's One Day International (ODI) and Twenty20 International (T20I) squads for their series against Sri Lanka. He made his ODI debut on 23 July 2021 in the dead rubber third ODI playing run-a-ball innings of 46 and ended on the losing team. He disappointed with the bat in the T20 series in which a depleted Team India lost to Sri Lanka 2–1 with Samson scoring only 34 runs. He missed out from the Indian squad for the 2021 ICC Men's T20 World Cup, held in October 2021, because of his poor form in T20s.

=== Among the runs (2022–onwards) ===
In February 2022, he was named in India's T20 squad for their series against Sri Lanka. He didn't bat in the first match but scored 39 and 18 in the next two matches. In June 2022, he was named in India's squad for their T20I series against Ireland. In the second match of the series, he scored his maiden half century in T20I, making 77 runs off 42 balls. His partnership with Deepak Hooda of 176 runs was the highest partnership for the second wicket in men's T20I and the highest partnership for any wicket for India.

In June 2022, he was named in India's squad for the first T20I of their series against England, but didn't feature in the starting eleven. In July 2022, he was named in India's ODI squad for their away series against the West Indies. He scored his maiden ODI half-century in the second match of the series. His 99-run partnership with Shreyas Iyer in the fourth wicket set the foundation for India's victory. On 29 July 2022, he was added to India's Twenty 20 International (T20I) squad, also for their series against West Indies, after KL Rahul tested positive for COVID-19 and scored 30* and 15 in the last two matches respectively. The same month, he was named in India's One Day International (ODI) squad for their series against Zimbabwe. In the second ODI against Zimbabwe, he scored an unbeaten 43 and took three catches and was declared the man of the match.

In October 2022, he was named in India's squad against South Africa for three ODIs. He scored an unbeaten 86 runs off 63 balls in the first ODI, but ended up in the losing team. But India managed to turn things around in next two ODIs with Samson unbeaten on 30 and 2 respectively. He was not selected for 2022 T20 World Cup. In December 2022, he was selected for T20I series against Sri Lanka but scored only 5 runs in first match and got ruled out for remaining two matches due to an injury in his left knee while attempting to field a ball near the boundary ropes during the 1st T20I. In June 2023, he was named in ODI and T20I series for West Indies tour. He scored 51 off 41 balls in third ODI but had a rough T20I series where he scored 12,7 and 13 respectively and did not get to bat in third and fourth matches. He was also selected for next T20I away series against Ireland and scored 40 off 26 balls in second T20I.

On 30 November 2023, he was selected in India's squad for the 3 match ODI series against South Africa. He scored his maiden hundred in the third ODI of the series scoring 108 off 114 balls which proved to be match winning as India won the series decider by 78 runs. He was adjudged with man of the match award.

On 30 April 2024, he was selected in India's 15 member Squad for the 2024 ICC Men's T20 World Cup to be held in USA and West Indies which they won.

In October 2024, he was named in India's squad for the three-match T20I series against Bangladesh. In the third match of the series, he scored his maiden T20I century, registering 111 runs off 47 balls and contributing to India's victory. During the innings, he set multiple records, including the second-fastest century by an Indian batter in T20Is, the fastest fifty by an Indian wicketkeeper-batter against Bangladesh, and the highest individual score by an Indian batter against Bangladesh in T20Is.

He was also selected for the 4 match T20I series in South Africa tour. He scored 107 runs out of 50 balls, including 7 fours and 10 sixes in the 1st match, being the first Indian batter to score centuries in consecutive matches. He has also become the first Indian wicket-keeper batter to score a century in T20I in South Africa soil. He also scored another century in the 4th T20I, scoring unbeaten 109 of 56 balls with 6 fours and 9 sixes to his name making his century tally to 3 in T20 internationals. Along with Tilak Varma who scored another century he put up a record unbeaten 210 run 2nd wicket partnership to guide India to mammoth total of 283 in the 4th T20.

By scoring his 3rd T20 century against South Africa on 15 November 2024, Sanju became the batsman with most centuries in a calendar year in T20 Internationals, which is 3.

On 1 March 2026 against the West Indies in a deciding Super 8 match during the 2026 T20 World Cup, Samson hit his first 50+ score in the competition, hitting an unbeaten 97 off 50 balls and hitting 12 fours and 4 sixes as India scored 199/5 in 19.2 overs, successfully chasing down the target of 196 set by the West Indies, which was the highest target successfully chased by India in T20 World Cups. He won the Player of the Match award for his match-winning knock.

In the semi-final of the ICC Men's T20 World Cup held on 5 March 2026, Sanju Samson scored a rapid 89 runs off 42 balls against England, helping India post a massive total of 253 in the knockout stage. His innings played a key role in setting up a challenging target for England. Samson was adjudged the Player of the Match, marking his second consecutive award following his performance against the West Indies.

In the finals of T20 World Cup 2026, played in Ahmedabad, Sanju Samson scored 89 of 46 balls against New Zealand. With that he became the 3rd highest run scoring batsman in the tournament, with a total of 321 runs. Subsequently, Samson was named as the Player of the tournament, despite only featuring in 5 games.

Sanju Samson was named the ICC Men's Player of the Month for March 2026 following a defining performance in India's successful defense of the ICC Men's T20 World Cup title. This recognition highlighted his crucial role in the tournament victory.

Sanju scored back to back fifties against Afghanistan and scored a 41 ball 82 against West Indies in 2026. He was also a member of the Indian team that won the gold medal at the 2026 Asian Games in Japan.

== Indian Premier League ==
Samson was named by Kolkata Knight Riders in its player pool ahead of 2009 Indian Premier League. He was signed by Kolkata Knight Riders ahead of 2012 Indian Premier League but did not get to play and was released ahead of the 2013 season. He was signed to play for Rajasthan Royals in 2013. He made his IPL debut for Rajasthan against Kings XI Punjab on 14 April 2013 after the regular wicket-keeper Dishant Yagnik failed to recover from an injury. In his second match, he scored 63 runs from 41 balls, becoming the then youngest player in IPL to score a half-century. (Note: Riyan Parag later broke this record during 2019 IPL.) He won the Emerging Player award of 2013 season with 206 runs and six stumpings from 10 innings.

Samson made his Champions League Twenty20 debut for Rajasthan Royals against the Mumbai Indians on 21 September 2013 and scored 54 off 47 balls, becoming the youngest player to score a half-century in CLT20. He was retained by Rajasthan ahead of the 2014 season.

In 2016, Delhi Capitals signed Samson after Rajasthan was banned from the competition for two years after being found guilty in illegal betting and match-fixing probe. He scored his maiden T20 century against Rising Pune Supergiants during the 2017 Indian Premier League.

He returned to Rajasthan in the 2018 IPL auction He scored his second IPL century in the next season, hitting an unbeaten 102* against Sunrisers Hyderabad. During the 2020 season, Sanju scored a 32-ball 74 against Chennai Super Kings. He led Rajasthan to the highest successful run chase in IPL history with 85 runs from 42 balls against Kings XI Punjab in the next match. He played his 100th IPL match, later in the season.

"You're a captain when you're fielding, not when you're batting".

— Sanju Samson on an interview with ESPNcricinfo before IPL 2021

In January 2021, Samson was named the captain of Rajasthan Royals ahead of the 2021 Indian Premier League. He scored a century in his first match as captain, becoming the first IPL captain to achieve the feat. He completed 3000 runs in IPL later in the season.

In November 2021, he was retained by Rajasthan Royals ahead of the 2022 Indian Premier League. Samson surpassed Ajinkya Rahane to become the all-time leading run-scorer for Rajasthan during the season. Rajasthan went on to play the finals and finished as the runners-up under his leadership.

In 2023, he played as a captain of Rajasthan Royals and scored 362 runs with 3 half centuries in season and finished 5th on points table.

In 2024, Rajasthan Royals won 8 matches out of their first 9 matches under his leadership. He individually scored 531 runs out of 16 matches with 5 half centuries, which is considered the best season for him. In this season, Rajasthan Royals ended up the league stage at 3rd on points table, and went on to Qualifier 2 but defeated by Sunrisers Hyderabad by 36 runs.

On 15 November 2025, Samson was officially traded to the Chennai Super Kings by Rajasthan Royals, ahead of the IPL 2026 season. In this high-profile trade, CSK traded away Ravindra Jadeja and Sam Curran to Rajasthan to acquire Samson. Playing for CSK, Sanju Samson scored 477 runs across 13 innings, averaging 47.70 runs per inning. He also set the record for most runs scored by a designated CSK wicketkeeper in a single IPL season.

== Career Statistics ==
=== Franchise ===
Team	Season	IPL		CLT20		Total	
Team	Season	Matches	Runs	Matches	Runs	Matches	Runs
Kolkata Knight Riders	2012	—	—	—	—	0	0
Rajasthan Royals	2013	11	206	6	192	17	398
Rajasthan Royals	2014	13	339	—	—	13	339
Rajasthan Royals	2015	14	204	Cancelled		14	204
Delhi Daredevils	2016	14	291	Cancelled		14	291
Delhi Daredevils	2017	14	386	Cancelled		14	386
Rajasthan Royals	2018	15	441	Cancelled		15	441
Rajasthan Royals	2019	12	342	Cancelled		12	342
Rajasthan Royals	2020	14	375	Cancelled		14	375
Rajasthan Royals	2021	14	484	Cancelled		14	484
Rajasthan Royals	2022	17	458	Cancelled		17	458
Rajasthan Royals	2023	14	362	Cancelled		14	362
Rajasthan Royals	2024	16	531	Cancelled		16	531
Rajasthan Royals	2025	9	285	Cancelled		9	285
Chennai Super Kings	2026	14	477	Cancelled		14	477
Total		191	5181	6	192	197	5373

== Playing style ==
Sanju is considered to be a naturally aggressive batsman who has quality batting techniques and wicket-keeping skills. He holds the bat high on the handle and keeps a loose shoulder, and demonstrates excellent hand-eye coordination. He is considered an excellent timer of the ball who mostly sticks to his range between cover and fine-leg. He prefers to stay still at the crease and rarely moves down the track to play shots. He has the ability to play straight and prefers to hit straight over the bowler's head. He can play aerial shots without moving his head.

"There’s not much feet movement – only when he has to step out. Otherwise, he stays still, maintains balance and that’s why he manages to transfer his weight well and get his timing right.”

— Akash Chopra analysing Samson's batting.

His power has been compared to powerful stroke-makers such as Rohit Sharma and AB de Villiers who can middle the ball to play shots with seemingly minimal effort. His batting style has been described as "fearless" in Twenty20 cricket. However, he has a weakness in rotating strike.

He is also an athletic fielder who is flexible to field in any position.

== Outside cricket ==
Samson worked as a manager of Bharat Petroleum in Thiruvananthapuram in 2016. In 2018, he started a sports academy, namely "Six Guns Sports Academy", devoted to cricket and football training for young players in Thiruvananthapuram. He was appointed as the State election icon of Kerala, ahead of the 2021 Kerala Legislative Assembly election. In February 2023, Indian Super League club Kerala Blasters FC announced the appointment of Samson as its brand ambassador. In March 2024, Sanju Samson was appointed brand ambassador of Adi Group of Institutions. In October 2025, Samson was named India brand ambassador of the English Premier League .

=== Personal life ===
Sanju married his long-time girlfriend Charulatha Remesh, a Hindu and a native of Thiruvananthapuram, in 2018. The couple met at Mar Ivanios College. The wedding took place in a private ceremony at Kovalam. Their marriage was registered under the Special Marriage Act.
