= Abdul Basith (cricketer) =

Indian cricketer (born 1998)

Personal information
- Full name: Pappanayil Abdul Basith
- Born: 9 October 1998 (age 28); Ernakulam, Kerala, India
- Batting: Right-handed
- Bowling: Right-arm off-break
- Role: All-rounder

Domestic team information
- Years: Team
- 2022–: Kerala
- 2023: Rajasthan Royals
- 2024–: Trivandrum Royals

Career statistics
Competition	List A	T20
Matches	20	23
Runs scored	371	335
Batting average	26.50	30.45
100s/50s	0/2	0/1
Top score	90	54
Balls bowled	207	186
Wickets	3	6
Bowling average	57.66	3850
5 wickets in innings	0	0
10 wickets in match	0	0
Best bowling	3/20	2/42
Catches/stumpings	13/0	13/0
- Source: ESPNcricinfo, 11 April 2025

Abdul Basith (born 9 October 1998) is an Indian cricketer who plays for Kerala in domestic cricket and Rajasthan Royals in Indian Premier League. He is an all-rounder who bats right-handed and bowls off spin.

== Career ==
He made his professional, and Twenty20 debut for Kerala, against Arunachal Pradesh, on 11 October 2022. He made his List A debut for Kerala against Haryana, on November 12, 2022.

In February 2023, he was bought by Rajasthan Royals for the 2023 Indian Premier League season for Rs. 20 Lakhs.
