= Rajasthan Royals =

Jaipur-based cricket franchise in the Indian Premier League

- League: Indian Premier League

Personnel
- Captain: Riyan Parag
- Coach: Kumar Sangakkara
- Owner: Lakshmi Mittal (75%); Adar Poonawalla (18%); Manoj Badale (7%)

Team information
- City: Jaipur, Rajasthan, India
- Founded: 2008; 18 years ago
- Home ground: Sawai Mansingh Stadium, Jaipur
- Capacity: 24,000
- Secondary home ground(s): Assam Cricket Association Stadium, Guwahati
- Secondary ground capacity: 37,800

History
- Indian Premier League wins: 1 (2008)
- Official website: rajasthanroyals.com
Standard Kit
Pink Promise Kit

The Rajasthan Royals, also known as RR, are a professional Twenty20 cricket team based in Jaipur, Rajasthan, that competes in the Indian Premier League (IPL). Founded in 2008 as one of the initial eight franchises, the Royals were owned by Indian tycoon Manoj Badale for several years. In March 2026, an American consortium led by Kal Somani, Rob Walton, and the Hamp family was reported to have bought the team for $1.63 billion but the deal fell through and then in May 2026, a consortium led by Lakshmi Mittal and Adar Poonawalla acquired it for $1.65 billion with Lakshmi having majority stake at 75% and Adar 18% and remaining being with Manoj Badale. The Royals team is based at the Sawai Mansingh Stadium in Jaipur. It plays its home matches at Sawai Mansingh Stadium and at Assam Cricket Association Stadium, Guwahati.

The team won the inaugural edition of the IPL under the captaincy of Shane Warne, despite being written off as a title contender by the media and fans. The Royals were also the runners-up of the 2013 Champions League Twenty20 under Rahul Dravid's captaincy, and the runners-up of the 2022 Indian Premier League under the captaincy of Sanju Samson and leadership of Kumar Sangakkara. The team qualified for playoffs in 2024 Indian Premier League but lost to Sunrisers Hyderabad in qualifier 2 by 36 runs under the captaincy of Sanju Samson and leadership of Sangakkara. The team had announced former team India coach and ex-Rajasthan Royals player and mentor Rahul Dravid as Head Coach for IPL 2025.

On 14 July 2015, the verdict reached by a panel appointed by the Supreme Court of India suspended Rajasthan Royals and Chennai Super Kings for two years over a 2013 betting scandal, meaning they could not participate in both the 2016 and 2017 IPL tournaments. The team returned to the competition with the 2018 season.

The team's record run-scorer is Sanju Samson with 4219 runs, while the leading wicket-taker is Jofra Archer, with 70 wickets. Shane Warne, Shane Watson, Jos Buttler, Dipesh Vaishnav, Riyan Parag,James Faulkner, Steve Smith, Jofra Archer, Ajinkya Rahane, and Yusuf Pathan are widely regarded as some of the most notable players in the history of the Rajasthan Royals.

== History ==
=== Formation ===
The Board of Control for Cricket in India (BCCI) announced the establishment of the Indian Premier League (IPL) in September 2007, a Twenty20 competition to be started in 2008. The Rajasthan Royals were one of the original eight teams in the inaugural season of the IPL in 2008. Emerging Media gained ownership of the Jaipur-based franchise team with a bid of $67 million, making it the least expensive team in the league.

As of 2024, the franchise is owned by the Royals Sports Group (Emerging Media Sporting Holdings Limited), which holds a 65% stake. Key minority stakeholders include Lachlan Murdoch and RedBird Capital Partners. There have been past controversies regarding the ownership of the franchise, leading to a brief expulsion of the team from the league in 2010. The franchise made a pre-tax profit of $7.5 million in 2009.

=== Expulsion from the IPL and return ===
In 2010, the BCCI decided to expel Kings XI Punjab and Rajasthan Royals from the IPL. The expulsion baffled captain Shane Warne who stated that he suspected that there might be some foul play and that the BCCI might possess some ulterior motives. The Rajasthan Royals filed an appeal against the decision and the two parties went to the Bombay High Court. The Bombay High Court adjourned that case until 29 October 2010, but it was revised to 15 November because they didn't want it to coincide with Diwali celebrations from 1 to 14 November.

Later, it was announced by the Royals that they told the Bombay High Court that they would be negotiating with an arbitrator to see if they could reconcile with the IPL. The arbitrator announced that while the investigation was ongoing, the Royals would remain a part of the IPL for six weeks and the BCCI would not be allowed to change rules which might go against the Royals. The six-week period included the player auction in which Rajasthan Royals participated. After this, the Bombay High Court rejected the appeals of the BCCI against keeping the Rajasthan Royals in the IPL for six weeks while the case was sorted out. It was estimated that because of the losses in court cases and damage to its reputation, the BCCI decided not to pursue further legal action against the Rajasthan Royals or Kings XI Punjab – the teams were allowed to remain in the IPL.

=== 2008 IPL season ===
Before the start of the inaugural IPL season, many considered the Royals as possibly the weakest team in the IPL, giving them little chance of competing well in the tournament. Evidence of the latter opinion seemed to be confirmed when the team lost its first match against the Delhi Daredevils in a 9 wicket loss. The fears were confirmed that the team was likely to struggle.

In their first home game ever at Sawai Mansingh Stadium in Jaipur, they played against the Kings XI Punjab and won by 6 wickets as Shane Watson was declared the man of the match for his unbeaten 76 off 49 balls in what was a successful run chase. That was followed by a crucial 3 wicket win against the season favourite, Deccan Chargers, in Hyderabad. The victory proved to be a huge morale booster. Yusuf Pathan won the first man of the match award for his bowling figures of 2/20 in 4 overs and a 28-ball 61.

The next game against the Kolkata Knight Riders was won by 45 runs where Swapnil Asnodkar received his first man of the match award for a fine knock of 60 off just 34 balls.

They further managed to defeat the Chennai Super Kings in Jaipur but lost to Mumbai Indians in Navi Mumbai. The Royals continued to win the next five games in a row. They were the first team to book a place in the semi-finals with their 65 run win over the Royal Challengers Bangalore and were pitted against Chennai Super Kings for the finals. The Royals won by 3 wickets in the final played on 1 June 2008.

The all-rounder Shane Watson won the man of the tournament award for scoring as many as 472 runs and picking 17 wickets. Shane Warne's captaincy and coaching were praised and well received by everyone, including opposition teams.

Each player and representative in the team was awarded a medal. The team was presented with the DLF Indian Premier League trophy along with a cheque for US$1.2 million prize money. Many of the Royals players also took home individual awards for their performance during the tournament; Yusuf Pathan claimed the Man of the Match award for the final match, Sohail Tanvir finished the tournament in possession of the Purple Cap (the IPL's leading wicket-taker), and Australian all-rounder Shane Watson was declared the Man of the Series.

=== 2009 IPL season ===
The Royals were the defending champions. Sohail Tanvir was ineligible to play for the team as PCB failed to provide NOC for Pakistani players playing in the competition. Shane Watson was unavailable for the whole season as Australia toured to UAE for the ODI series against Pakistan. Without these two, the team looked slightly weaker than the previous season and players such as Graeme Smith, Shaun Tait, and Shane Warne had to be relied on.

The defending champions got off to the worst possible start by losing their opening match by 75 runs to Royal Challengers Bangalore in a match which saw The Royals record what was at the time the lowest total (58 all out) in the history of the IPL and to date is still the second lowest. The same match also saw the Royals pick-up the unwanted record of the lowest ever powerplay total (14/2) in the IPL. They remained defeated by Mumbai Indians, Kolkata Knight Riders, Kings XI Punjab, and Chennai Super Kings but they won over Delhi Daredevils and Deccan Chargers. The Royals were at the end of the points table. Mohammed Kaif, Dinesh Salunkhe, Paras Dogra, Anup Revandkar, Shrideep Mangela, Ashraf Makda, and Azhar Malik were dropped from the team and sent home.

Rajasthan Royals ended 6th out of the 8 teams in the competition, winning 6 matches out of the 14 they played. The Royals failed to make it to the semi-finals after losing their last two matches against Delhi Daredevils and Kolkata Knight Riders.

=== British Asian Cup ===
On 14 May 2009, it was announced that Rajasthan Royals would meet Middlesex Crusaders in a one-off Twenty20 for the British Asian Cup. It was the first time that an annual charity series was to be played between the Twenty20 champions of the two countries. The match took place on 6 July 2009. The teams were announced on 3 July 2009 with Rajasthan Royals including Mohammad Kaif and the comeback of Sohail Tanvir.

The match was won by Rajasthan Royals by 46 runs after scoring 162/5 in 20 overs and successfully defending it by 46 runs (Middlesex 116/7). The Man of the Match was Dimitri Mascarenhas.

=== 2010 IPL season ===
The Royals were back in India after their average outing in South Africa. This time they seemed to be a better outfit as they were to play in conditions that should have suited them the most. But they had to suffer an unfortunate start to the competition, with a narrow 4 run defeat to the Mumbai Indians at the Brabourne Stadium in Mumbai. The highlight of this match though, was Yusuf Pathan hitting the fastest ever hundred in IPL history, off only 37 balls. Even some of the Mumbai fans were disappointed not to see Rajasthan win, by the end of it all.

They went on to lose to the Delhi Daredevils by 6 wickets in one of their new ‘home’ grounds, Ahmedabad. And were again bruised badly by the Royal Challengers Bangalore, who won by 10 wickets. The team remained inconsistent throughout the whole season, winning their next four matches consecutively. One of the young Turks of the erstwhile ICL, Abhishek Jhunjhunwala impressed against the franchise representing his home state, Kolkata Knight Riders as his 36-ball 45 helped the Royals win by 34 runs.

Followed by which the Western Australian batsman Adam Voges hit 45 runs off 24 balls to help Rajasthan beat Punjab in Mohali by 31 runs. The team seemed to have adapted to the Ahmedabad conditions better with wins against Deccan Chargers by 8 wickets as Yusuf Pathan continued his good form against the team, while they beat Chennai Super Kings by 17 runs, thanks to wicket-keeper batsman Naman Ojha's 49-ball 80.

But they lost against Chennai in their return clash as Murali Vijay's hundred took the game away from them as well as were crushed in Delhi by 67 runs. But they managed to escape a Deccan Chargers attack, with a narrow 2 run victory in Nagpur and continued their unbeaten run in Jaipur though, as the out of sorts Kings XI Punjab were duly beaten by 9 wickets with English opener Michael Lumb winning the man of the match award for his 43-ball 83.

Once again, Rajasthan Royals ended the tournament miserably with losses to Mumbai Indians and the Royal Challengers Bangalore at home and the Kolkata Knight Riders in the last round-robin game in Kolkata. Consequently, they failed to make it to the playoffs for the second consecutive season as they finished 7th out of the 8 teams in the competition, winning 6 games out of 14 played.

=== 2011 IPL season ===
The Rajasthan Royals, and the Kings XI Punjab were temporarily ejected from the league due to issues with their unreported ownership changes. The teams were reinstated with involvement from the High Court. Their owners were broken into several legal entities when the BCCI required the incorporation of the companies. Kochi was also at risk of ejection for the same reasons before BCCI cleared their new ownership pattern for the tournament.

The team management decided to retain the Australian duo of Shane Warne and Shane Watson for the following three seasons of the IPL, although Warne's future continued to be uncertain. Yet, he decided to make this his final season for the Rajasthan Royals on the insistence of the team owners who felt that he was the ultimate source of inspiration for the team on and off the field.

In the auction, the team's funds were reduced since they were penalised by the BCCI in 2010 and as a result, had to pay a certain amount of bank guarantee as fixed by the High Court. But they possessed an adequate amount of money to buy some of the world's finest T20 players, which they did not exactly.

They managed to buy back Australian fast bowler Shaun Tait for US$300,000 as well as South African bowling all-rounder Johan Botha for US$950,000. The other star players which they picked were New Zealand batsman Ross Taylor for US$1 million as well as ‘The Wall’ Rahul Dravid for half that price. England's World T20 2010 winning skipper Paul Collingwood was also purchased for a mere US$250,000. The other players were mostly from the domestic circuits but were confident individuals following Rajasthan winning the Ranji Trophy that year.

Rajasthan Royals began the IPL 2011 in grand fashion, beating the Kumar Sangakkara-led Deccan Chargers by 8 wickets, with the young Indian pacer Siddharth Trivedi adjudged the man of the match for his spell of 3/15 and the Royals continued their fine record against the Chargers. While Shane Warne defied age with a fine piece of bowling to assist Rajasthan in defeating a weakened Delhi Daredevils team by 6 wickets, with figures of 2/17.

However, their confidence was dented with two back-to-back defeats to the new-look Kolkata Knight Riders in three days. In the clash at Jaipur, they lost by 9 wickets, due to a 100-run partnership between Gautam Gambhir and Jacques Kallis, Whereas, in Kolkata, Lakshmipathy Balaji picked 3/15 in 4 overs on a minefield pitch in Eden Gardens to help his team pull off an 8 wicket victory.

The match against the Royal Challengers Bangalore in Bangalore was washed out due to rain, which made Rajasthan's task of making it into the last four much tougher. Shaun Marsh was in great nick and his 42-ball 71 resulted in the Royals losing to Kings XI Punjab in Mohali by 48 runs. However, they pulled together a string of a hat-trick of home wins, as Rajasthan chased successfully in all the three matches. The first was against the Kochi Tuskers Kerala, winning by 8 wickets. Followed by Mumbai Indians, the No. 1 team then on the points table as they chased down a total of 100 with 7 wickets to spare. And then the Pune Warriors India were undone by Ross Taylors’ 35-ball 47 not out, as Rajasthan won by 6 wickets.

But again it was inconsistency which let the Royals down badly. They were given a proper thumping by the eventual champions Chennai Super Kings in both the matches they played against each other, within five days. The in-form Royal Challengers Bangalore thrashed them by 9 wickets, while they were bowled out for 97 in their 8-wicket defeat to the Kochi Tuskers Kerala.

Although this time they ended their round-robin matches well with a win against the Mumbai Indians in Mumbai and in the process, giving Shane Warne a fitting farewell, Rajasthan were dismissed from the competition since they ended at the 6th position out of the 10 teams in the tournament, having again won 6 out of their 14 matches played, with one being a no result.

=== 2012 IPL season ===
Rajasthan Royals finished in seventh place among the points table in season 5 of the IPL, winning only seven matches out of sixteen.

=== 2013 IPL season ===
Rajasthan Royals qualified for the playoff stage by finishing third in the group stage, thus grabbing a spot in 2013 Champions League Twenty20. They won against Sunrisers Hyderabad in the eliminator but lost to Mumbai Indians in the second qualifier, which led to their exit from the tournament. Shane Watson was declared the Man of the Tournament.

==== 2013 spot-fixing case ====
On 16 May 2013, three Rajasthan Royals players Sreesanth, Ankeet Chavan and Ajit Chandila were arrested from Mumbai by Delhi Police along with eleven bookies on charges of spot-fixing in the tournament. The fixing happened in the matches against Pune Warriors on 5 May, Kings XI Punjab on 9 May and Mumbai Indians on 15 May. Later, BCCI suspended the three players.

=== 2014 IPL season ===
Rajasthan Royals retained five players – Sanju Samson, Ajinkya Rahane, Shane Watson, James Faulkner and Stuart Binny – for the seventh season of the IPL. James Faulkner scored 65 runs off the last 17 balls at a strike rate of 382.35 to win the match against RCB. Shane Watson led the team and Rahul Dravid played the role of a mentor.

=== 2015 IPL season ===
In the 2015 IPL, Rajasthan Royals qualified for the playoffs by finishing fourth in the league stage, but lost to Royal Challengers Bangalore in the eliminator, which led to their exit from the tournament.

==== Lodha Committee inquiry and subsequent ban ====
In 2015, the team was banned for two years following the Lodha Committee inquiry.

Rajasthan Royals became the source of controversy when inappropriate and fictitious bids were made, violating the BCCI norms. Ranjit Barthakur and Fraser Castellino were the only two shareholders of the team, which was completely unknown to the BCCI at the time. An out-of-court settlement between the two ensued.In 2015, Rajasthan Royals were banned for two years by the BCCI, with its owner Raj Kundra banned for life.

=== 2018 IPL season ===
In 2018, the Rajasthan Royals made a comeback to the IPL after two years of suspension. Prior to the 2018 IPL auction, the Royals retained Steve Smith for ₹120 million (US$1.3 million), announcing him as captain for the 2018 season. Following the ball tampering controversy in March 2018, Smith stepped down as Royals captain with Ajinkya Rahane appointed. Smith was subsequently banned from playing in the 2018 IPL season. Following Steve Smith's ban, Heinrich Klaasen was announced as replacement.

On 2 May 2018, in a match against the Delhi Daredevils, Jos Buttler scored the fastest ever 50 for Rajasthan Royals, off just 18 balls. This was also the fifth-fastest in IPL history. However, RR lost the match by four runs after failing to make the revised target of 151 from 12 overs due to rain. Buttler also equalled Virender Sehwag’s record for most consecutive fifties in the IPL, with 5 consecutive fifties.

The Royals managed to secure fourth place in the regular season, with 14 points. However, they crashed out of the playoffs in the eliminator against Kolkata Knight Riders, losing by 25 runs in Eden Gardens.

=== 2019 IPL season ===
Ahead of 2019 IPL Auction, Royals retained 16 players and released 9 players. During the auction, Rajasthan bought 9 players.

Paddy Upton was named the Royals coach ahead of 2019 Indian Premier League. Steve Smith made a comeback to the IPL on 25 March 2019 after he was banned by BCCI to participate in the 2018 season due to Australian ball-tampering controversy. Ajinkya Rahane retained his captaincy at the start of the season, however, on 20 April 2019 Steve Smith replaced Ajinkya Rahane as captain of Rajasthan Royals after a string of poor results.

=== 2020 IPL season ===
Ahead of 2020 IPL Auction, Royals retained 11 players and released 11 players. respectively. Royals bought Mayank Markande, Rahul Tewatia and Ankit Rajpoot via trade from Delhi Capitals and Kings XI Punjab.Royals have traded Ajinkya Rahane, Krishnappa Gowtham, Dhawal Kulkarni to Delhi Capitals, Kings XI Punjab and Mumbai Indians

Andrew McDonald was named the Royals head coach of 2020 Indian Premier League replacing Paddy Upton. Steve Smith was named to continue as captain of Royals.

The team started off really well in the season by winning their first two matches. However, they could not keep the momentum and succumbed to four consecutive losses after it, and ended their season at the bottom of the points table after winning six out of fourteen matches. Despite Rajasthan ending at the bottom, their bowler Jofra Archer was named the most valuable player of the season.

=== 2021 IPL season ===
On 20 January 2021, ahead of the auction for the 2021 Indian Premier League, Rajasthan released eight players, including their captain Steve Smith. On the same day, they also announced that Sanju Samson would be the captain for the 2021 season. In his first match as captain Samson smashed a century (119 off 63 deliveries) but failed to win the match for his team as Royals lost to Punjab Kings by 4 runs in a high scoring encounter. Samson was the highest run scorer for the team for the season with 484 runs in 14 innings and Chris Morris was the highest wicket-taker for the team with 15 wickets in 11 innings. Rajasthan failed to qualify for the play-offs and finished 7th in the points table after winning only 5 matches out of 14 matches.

=== 2022 IPL season ===
On 30 November 2021, ahead of the auction for the 2022 Indian Premier League, Rajasthan retained their captain Sanju Samson, Jos Buttler, and youngster Yashasvi Jaiswal and released all the other players from their squad.

Royals bought a set of experienced international stars including Ravichandran Ashwin, Trent Boult, Shimron Hetmyer, Yuzvendra Chahal, James Neesham, Nathan Coulter-Nile, Rassie van der Dussen, Daryl Mitchell.

After doing well in the league stage and finishing second in the points table, the team lost twice to Gujarat Titans within the space of six days, first in Qualifier 1 and then in the final to finish as runners up. Jos Buttler earned the MVP award, as well as the Orange Cap with a tally of 864 runs in 17 innings, while Yuzvendra Chahal won the Purple Cap for taking the most wickets (27) in the season.

=== 2023 IPL season ===
Rajasthan Royals began their 2023 season with a 72-run victory over Sunrisers Hyderabad. One of the key positives for the team was the performance of Yashasvi Jaiswal, who won the Emerging Player of the Season award. Jaiswal scored 625 runs in 14 matches at an Average of 48.07 and a strike rate of 163.61.

After an excellent first half of the tournament winning 4 of its first 7 matches Royals failed to qualify for the play-offs after winning only 3 of its last 7 matches and ended up 5th on the points table. Jaiswal was the highest run-scorer for the team with 625 runs and Yuzvendra Chahal finished the season with 21 wickets.

=== 2024 IPL season ===
The Royals started off their season well winning their first four matches. The streak was broken when they lost to the Titans on the last ball of the match. They followed this with a close win against Punjab. In the next match against KKR, the Royals equalled the highest ever chased in the IPL when they scored 8/224 courtesy of Jos Buttler scoring an unbeaten 107. After which they went on another winning streak.

Royals won 8 of its first 9 matches but went on to lose next 4 of its last 5 matches with their last league match being washed off in rain, RR managed to qualify for playoffs. In the eliminator they defeated Royal Challengers Bangalore, they lost against Sunrisers Hyderabad by 36 runs in the second qualifier. The highest run scorer of this season from this team was Riyan Parag (573). The highest wicket taker of this season from this team was Avesh Khan (19).

=== 2025 IPL season ===
Royals retained Sanju Samson, Yashasvi Jaiswal, Dhruv Jurel, Riyan Parag, Shimron Hetmyer and Sandeep Sharma ahead of the 2025 IPL mega auctions. They released marquee players like Trent Boult, Jos Buttler, Yuzvendra Chahal and Ravichandran Ashwin ahead of the auctions. In 2025, ahead of the IPL Auction 2025, Rajasthan Royals called up Vaibhav Sooryavanshi for trials. They challenged Vaibhav to make 17 runs of an over which Sooryavanshi fulfilled with 3 sixes. They signed him in the auction for 1.10CR (crore). Sooryavanshi later on made a 35 ball century against Gujarat Titans in Jaipur, India. Sanju Samson was injured mid season due to an abdominal injury.

=== 2026 IPL Season ===
Royals announced that Riyan Parag would be the captain for the 2026 season respectively. Royals bought Ravindra Jadeja and Sam Curran via trade from Chennai Super Kings.They also Bought Donovan Ferreira via trade from Delhi Capitals. Royals have traded Sanju Samson to Chennai Super Kings and Nitish Rana to Delhi Capitals. The Royals started off their season well winning their first four matches. Key positives for the team was the performance of Yashasvi Jaiswal, Vaibhav Sooryavanshi, Dhruv Jurel, Ravindra Jadeja, and Jofra Archer.Sooryavanshi had broken Chris Gayle's record for most sixes in a single IPL season and most sixes in an inning for RR against Sunrisers Hyderabad. The highest run scorer of this season from this team was Vaibhav Sooryavanshi (776). The highest wicket taker of this season from this team was Jofra Archer (25) but Vaibhav Sooryavanshi was just shy of a century three times with 93, 97 and 96 runs respectively and hitting six against greatest bowler. RR managed to qualify for playoffs. In the eliminator they defeated Sunrisers Hyderabad, they lost against Gujarat Titans by 7 wickets in the second qualifier.Vaibhav Sooryavanshi was the fastest person to reach 1000 runs in 23 match for Rajasthan Royals.

Vaibhav Sooryavanshi (776 Runs and 48.50 Average and 237.8 SR, 6 50s) 

Dhruv Jurel (515 Runs and 36.79 Average and  154.65 SR, 6 50s)

Yashasvi Jaiswal (427 Runs and 30.50 Average and 152.5 SR, 3 50s )

Donovan Ferreira (317 Runs and 35.22 Average and 179.09 SR )

Ravindra Jadeja ( 266 Runs and 66.50 Average and 135.02 SR  & 10 wickets and 8.39 economy )

Jofra Archer (25 wickets and 9.32 economy )

== Ownership history ==
=== Inception and Manoj Badale era (2008–2026) ===
The Rajasthan Royals were established in 2008 as the least expensive of the original eight Indian Premier League franchises, purchased by Manoj Badale's Emerging Media Ventures for $67 million.

The franchise's ownership structure underwent several significant changes during this period:

- 2009–2015: Following the inaugural season win, the team saw the entry of high-profile minority investors, including Shilpa Shetty and her husband Raj Kundra, who acquired an 11.7% stake through Kunda Investments. Following the 2013 IPL betting scandal, Kundra was banned for life and the couple exited the franchise ownership in 2015.
- 2021: RedBird Capital Partners acquired a 15% stake in the franchise for approximately $37.5 million, valuing the team at $250 million at the time. Manoj Badale’s Emerging Media subsequently increased its stake to 65%.

=== 2026 buyout ===
By December 2025, Badale – who held a 65% majority stake in the franchise – began gauging interest in a potential acquisition of the team, with potential for a full 100% buyout. Early valuations put the franchise's worth at over $1 billion. By late January, two primary groups emerged as the frontrunners to acquire the franchise: a consortium backed by Arizona-based entrepreneur Kal Somani and another led by the Times of India Group; the former offered a $1.3 billion acquisition. Reuters later reported on a slew of recent bidding entries, including those by Manchester United owner Avram Glazer, KKR, Blackstone, and American investor David Blitzer.

The surge in interest was viewed as a "watershed" moment for the Indian sports market and marked the start of a rise in American cricket investments. On 25 March 2026, a buyout deal was announced wherein 100% of the franchise would be sold to Somani, who had partnered with Walmart heir Rob Walton and Detroit Lions owners Sheila Ford Hamp and her son, Michael, to put forth a $1.63 billion offer. Including both the flagship IPL team and the franchise's global cricket academies in the UAE and Mauritius, the deal is the second-highest IPL sale in history, having been surpassed by the $1.78 billion sale of the Royal Challengers Bengaluru.

== Brand ==
=== Team anthem ===
The team anthem was called 'Halla Bol'. In the first IPL season, the song was sung by Ila Arun. In the second season, it was sung by Sunidhi Chauhan. The anthem was sung by Amit Trivedi and Mame Khan for the 2023 season.

=== Mascot ===
The team's mascot is a lion named Moochu Singh.

=== Kit suppliers and shirt sponsors ===
| Period | Kit supplier | Shirt sponsor (front) | Shirt sponsor (back) |
|---|---|---|---|
| 2008–2009 | Reebok | Bajaj Allianz | Royal Challenge |
| 2009–2011 | Puma | UltraTech Cement | HDFC Life |
| 2011–2012 | Puma | Floriana | HDFC Life |
| 2012–2013 | Puma | UltraTech Cement | HDFC Life |
| 2013–2015 | Puma | UltraTech Cement | Rupa |
| 2015–2018 | Provogue | UltraTech Cement | Rupa |
| 2018–2019 | TYKA | JK Lakshmi Cement | Mitsubishi |
| 2019–2020 | Alcis | JK Lakshmi Cement | Surya LED |
| 2020–2021 | Alcis | TV9 Bharatvarsh | Niine |
| 2021–2022 | Alcis | Expo 2020 | BKT |
| 2022–2023 | Alcis | Happilo | BKT |
| 2023–2026 | Alcis | Luminous | BKT |
| 2026–present | Vany | Waaree Solar | JK Lakshmi Cement |

== Rivalries ==
=== Rivalry with Punjab Kings ===
The rivalry between Rajasthan Royals and Punjab Kings is a long-standing one. Known as the Northern Derby, it is often a high-scoring encounter. In 25 matches, the Royals have come out on top 14 times; the Kings have won 11.

During the fourth match of the 2019 season, Ravichandran Ashwin, who at the time played for Punjab, ran out Jos Buttler at the non-striker's end. This caused tensions to flare between the teams.

In 2020, thanks to a brilliant opening stand between KL Rahul and Mayank Agarwal, Punjab scored 223/2 from their 20 overs. Rajasthan got off to a good start in the chase, but wickets began to fall, and the required run rate grew. Rahul Tewatia (at the time on 8 runs off 19 balls) hit five sixes in Sheldon Cottrell's 18th over to narrow the gap. Tom Curran hit the winning runs in the final over to give Rajasthan a famous comeback victory, setting the record for the highest successful run chase in IPL history until Punjab Kings themselves broke the record in 2024.

== Notable players ==
Traditionally, the Rajasthan Royals usually purchase relatively unknown or uncapped cricketers, meaning those who have not played for their nation, at cut-throat prices. The Royals are famous for their frugal spending in the IPL auctions, even during the mega-auctions held once in 3 years. They have even bought players who had previously never played first-class cricket such as Dinesh Salunkhe and Pravin Tambe. The team has also purchased leading world cricketers such as Shane Warne, Rahul Dravid, Shane Watson, Jos Buttler, Sanju Samson, Ravichandran Ashwin and Ben Stokes.

Many of the cricketers who have played for the Royals, having been bought by them as relatively unknown players, have ended up as leading international cricketers partly due to their strong performances in the IPL and backing from the Royals management. In the initial seasons, such players included Taruwar Kohli, who was acquired by the franchise in 2008 under the Under-19 player quota, and Yusuf Pathan, the elder brother of the Indian all-rounder Irfan Pathan, who was relatively unknown in cricketing circles unlike his more-celebrated younger brother. Yusuf's brilliant performances in the initial seasons of the IPL earned him a place in the Indian cricket team and he was a member of the Indian squad which won the 2011 Cricket World Cup. Even Australian Shane Watson, who has played for the Royals ever since its inception, became a permanent, consistent and leading member of the Australian cricket team soon after his brilliant first season with the Royals in 2008. In the later seasons, these players have included Indian cricketers such as Ajinkya Rahane, wicket-keeper-batsman Sanju Samson, leg-spinner Tambe, whose performances for the Royals earned him a Ranji Trophy debut for Mumbai at the age of 42, Stuart Binny and Dhawal Kulkarni, as well as international cricketers like James Faulkner, Steve Smith and Tim Southee. Even off-spinner Dipesh Vaishnav , who played only 2 first-class matches and was also convicted in the spot-fixing scandal, was one of the top bowlers for the Royals during the 2012 and 2013 seasons.

=== Captains ===
Last updated: 19 May 2026

| Player | Nationality (Note: The information in the nationality column is according to ESPNcricinfo. This information may not necessarily reflect the player's birthplace or citizenship.) | From | To | Matches | Won | Lost | Tied | NR | Win% | Best Result |
|---|---|---|---|---|---|---|---|---|---|---|
| Shane Warne | Australia | 2008 | 2011 | 56 | 31 | 24 | 1 | 0 | 55.35 | Winner (2008) |
| Rahul Dravid | India | 2012 | 2013 | 40 | 23 | 17 | 0 | 0 | 57.50 | Playoffs (2013) |
| Shane Watson | Australia | 2014 | 2015 | 21 | 7 | 11 | 2 | 1 | 33.33 | Playoffs (2015) |
| Steve Smith | Australia | 2014* | 2020 | 27 | 15 | 11 | 0 | 1 | 57.50 | 8/8 (2020) |
| Ajinkya Rahane | India | 2018 | 2019 | 24 | 9 | 15 | 0 | 0 | 37.50 | Playoffs (2018) |
| Sanju Samson | India | 2021 | 2025 | 67 | 33 | 32 | 0 | 1 | 49.25 | Runners-up (2022) |
| Riyan Parag | India | 2025 | Present | 19 | 8 | 11 | 0 | 0 | 42.11 | Playoffs (2026) |
| Yashasvi Jaiswal | India | 2026 | 2026 | 2 | 1 | 1 | 0 | 0 | 50.00 | Stand-In |

- Steve Smith filled in as captain for Shane Watson in 2014 and 2015 before replacing Ajinkya Rahane in 2019 and his full captaincy season was in 2020.
- Riyan Parag captained Rajasthan Royals in 2025 for most of the season, owing to an injury to the permanent captain Sanju Samson. He would then be named full time captain for 2026 season onwards.

== Home ground ==
The home venue of the Royals is the Sawai Mansingh Stadium in Jaipur. The stadium was built during the reign of Man Singh II. It is situated at one corner of the Rambagh Circle. The stadium seats 24,000 after the 2006 renovation. The Sardar Patel Gujarat Stadium in Ahmedabad has also hosted Rajasthan Royals' home matches. The Assam Cricket Association Stadium in Guwahati has also hosted the Rajasthan Royals' matches for the 2023-24 season.

The Sawai Mansingh Stadium in Jaipur once again started to host the Royals' home games from the 2018 IPL season onwards after their return from a two-year suspension which also saw the stadium being banned from hosting matches for four years.

== Current squad ==
- Players with international caps are listed in **bold**.
- * denotes a player who is currently unavailable for selection.
- * denotes a player who is unavailable for rest of the season.

| No. | Name | Nat | Birth date | Batting style | Bowling style | Year signed | Salary | Notes |
Batters
| 27 | Shubham Dubey | (India) | 27 August 1994 (age 32) | Left-handed | Right-arm off break | 2025 | ₹80 lakh (US$85,000) | |
| 64 | **Yashasvi Jaiswal** | (India) | 28 December 2001 (age 24) | Left-handed | Right-arm leg break | 2020 | ₹18 crore (US$1.9 million) | Vice Captain |
| 12 | **Vaibhav Sooryavanshi** | (India) | 27 March 2011 (age 15) | Left-handed | Left-arm orthodox | 2025 | ₹1.1 crore (US$120,000) | |
| 9 | Aman Rao Parela | (India) | 2 June 2004(age 23) | Right-handed | —N/a | 2026 | ₹30 lakh (US$32,000) | |
Wicket-keepers
| 21 | **Dhruv Jurel** | (India) | 21 January 2001 (age 25) | Right-handed | —N/a | 2022 | ₹14 crore (US$1.5 million) | |
| 6 | **Lhuan-dre Pretorius** | (South Africa) | 27 March 2006 (age 20) | Left-handed | —N/a | 2025 | ₹30 lakh (US$32,000) | Overseas |
All-rounders
| 8 | **Ravindra Jadeja** | (India) | 6 December 1988 (age 37) | Left-handed | Left-arm orthodox | 2026 | ₹14 crore (US$1.5 million) | |
| 7 | **Dasun Shanaka** | (Sri Lanka) | 9 September 1991 (age 35) | Right-handed | Right-arm medium | 2026 | ₹2 crore (US$210,000) | Overseas |
| 5 | **Riyan Parag** | (India) | 10 November 2001 (age 25) | Right-handed | Right-arm leg break | 2019 | ₹14 crore (US$1.5 million) | Captain |
| 2 | **Donovan Ferreira** | (South Africa) | 21 July 1998 (age 28) | Right-handed | Right-arm off break | 2026 | ₹1 crore (US$110,000) | Overseas |
Pace bowlers
| 20 | **Sandeep Sharma** | (India) | 18 May 1993 (age 33) | Right-handed | Right-arm fast-medium | 2023 | ₹4 crore (US$430,000) | |
| 11 | **Mohammed Shami** | (India) | 3 September 1990 (age 36) | Right-handed | Right-arm fast | 2027 | ₹8 crore (US$850,000) | |
| 22 | **Jofra Archer** | (England) | 1 April 1995 (age 31) | Right-handed | Right-arm fast | 2025 | ₹12.5 crore (US$1.3 million) | Overseas |
| 17 | **Nandre Burger** | (South Africa) | 11 August 1995 (age 31) | Left-handed | Left-arm fast-medium | 2024 | ₹3.5 crore (US$370,000) | Overseas |
| 51 | Sushant Mishra | (India) | 23 December 2000 (age 25) | Left-handed | Left-arm medium-fast | 2026 | ₹90 lakh (US$96,000) | |
| 16 | Brijesh Sharma | (India) | 16 December 1998 (age 27) | Right-handed | Right-arm medium | 2026 | ₹30 lakh (US$32,000) | |
Spin bowlers
| 56 | **Ravi Bishnoi** | (India) | 5 September 2000 (age 26) | Right-handed | Right-arm leg break | 2026 | ₹7.2 crore (US$770,000) | |
| 30 | Manimaran Siddharth | (India) | 3 July 1998 (age 28) | Right-handed | Left-arm orthodox | 2027 | ₹75 lakh (US$80,000) | |
| 14 | Yash Raj Punk | (India) | 26 June 2006 (age 20) | Left-handed | Left-arm leg break | 2026 | ₹30 lakh (US$32,000) | |
Source: RR Squad

== Administration and Support Staff ==
| Position | Name |
|---|---|
| CEO | |
| Team manager | (India) Romi Bhinder |
| Director of cricket and head coach | (Sri Lanka) Kumar Sangakkara |
| Fast bowling coach | (New Zealand) Shane Bond |
| Batting coach | (India) Vikram Rathour |
| Assistant coach | (Zimbabwe) Trevor Penney |
| Spin bowling and fielding coach | (South Africa) Richard Das Neves |
| Performance coach | (India) Siddhartha Lahiri |
| Head of Athletic Performance | (England) Michael Italiano |
| Head of medical | (Australia) John Gloster |
| Senior Physiotherapist | (India) Niranjan Pandit |
| Director of Analytics and Strategy | (England) Giles Lindsay |
| Lead Analyst | (India) Panish Shetty |
| Team Doctor | (India) Dr Salih Solomon |
| Director of culture and Leadership | (India) Aaron Walsh |
| Strength and Conditioning Coach | (India) AT Rajamani |
| Strength and Conditioning Coach | (India) Vihaan Murali |
| Logistics manager | (India) Parmendra Vikram Singh |
Source: RR Staff

== Seasons ==
=== Indian Premier League ===
| Year | League standing | Final standing |
|---|---|---|
| 2008 | 1st out of 8 | Champions |
| 2009 | 6th out of 8 | League stage |
| 2010 | 7th out of 8 | League stage |
| 2011 | 6th out of 10 | League stage |
| 2012 | 7th out of 9 | League stage |
| 2013 | 3rd out of 9 | Playoffs |
| 2014 | 5th out of 8 | League stage |
| 2015 | 4th out of 8 | Playoffs |
| 2018 | 4th out of 8 | Playoffs |
| 2019 | 7th out of 8 | League stage |
| 2020 | 8th out of 8 | League stage |
| 2021 | 7th out of 8 | League stage |
| 2022 | 2nd out of 10 | Runners-up |
| 2023 | 5th out of 10 | League stage |
| 2024 | 3rd out of 10 | Playoffs |
| 2025 | 9th out of 10 | League Stage |
| 2026 | 4th out of 10 | Playoffs |

=== Champions League Twenty20 ===
| Year | League standing | Final standing |
|---|---|---|
| 2013 | 1st out of 10 | Runners-up |

== Statistics ==
Summary of results
| Years | Matches | Wins | Losses | No Result | Success Rate |
|---|---|---|---|---|---|
| 2008 | 16 | 13 | 3 | 0 | 81.25% |
| 2009 | 14 | 6 | 7 | 1 | 42.86% |
| 2010 | 14 | 6 | 8 | 0 | 42.86% |
| 2011 | 14 | 6 | 7 | 1 | 42.86% |
| 2012 | 16 | 7 | 9 | 0 | 43.75% |
| 2013 | 18 | 11 | 7 | 0 | 61.11% |
| 2014 | 14 | 7 | 7 | 0 | 50.00% |
| 2015 | 15 | 7 | 6 | 2 | 46.67% |
| 2018 | 15 | 7 | 8 | 0 | 46.67% |
| 2019 | 14 | 5 | 8 | 1 | 35.71% |
| 2020 | 14 | 6 | 8 | 0 | 42.86% |
| 2021 | 14 | 5 | 9 | 0 | 35.71% |
| 2022 | 17 | 10 | 7 | 0 | 58.82% |
| 2023 | 14 | 7 | 7 | 0 | 50.00% |
| 2024 | 16 | 9 | 6 | 1 | 56.25% |
| 2025 | 14 | 4 | 10 | 0 | 28.57% |
| 2026 | 16 | 9 | 7 | 0 | 56.25% |
| Total | 255 | 125 | 124 | 6 | 49.02% |

== See also ==
- Barbados Tridents
- Paarl Royals
- Cricket in India
- Indian Premier League
