= Shubham Dubey =

Indian cricketer (born 1994)

Personal information
- Born: 27 August 1994 (age 32); Yavatmal, Maharashtra, India
- Batting: Left-handed
- Bowling: Right-arm offbreak
- Role: Middle-order batter

Domestic team information
- Years: Team
- 2021–present: Vidarbha
- 2024–present: Rajasthan Royals

Career statistics
Competition	FC	LA	T20
Matches	3	17	32
Runs scored	75	242	695
Batting average	18.75	40.33	38.61
100s/50s	0/0	0/1	0/2
Top score	32	62*	58*
Catches/stumpings	3/0	5/0	6/0
- Source: Cricinfo, 28 March 2025

Shubham Dubey (born 27 August 1994) is an Indian cricketer who has played for Vidarbha and Rajasthan Royals. He made his List A debut on 22 February 2021, for Vidarbha in the 2020–21 Vijay Hazare Trophy.
