= Luminous Power Technologies =

Indian Electric product manufacturer

Luminous Power Technologies Pvt. Ltd.
- Trade name: Luminous
- Company type: Private
- Industry: Electric power
- Founded: 1988; 38 years ago
- Founder: Rakesh Malhotra
- Headquarters: Gurgaon, Haryana, India
- Area served: Worldwide
- Key people: Preeti Bajaj (MD and CEO); Ganesh Moorthi (CTO); Neelima Burra (CMO); Sant Kumar Verma (CFO)
- Brands: Luminous; Amaze
- Owner: Schneider Electric (74%)
- Website: luminousindia.com

Luminous Power Technologies Pvt. Ltd., stylized as LUMINOUS is an Indian electricals and home appliances manufactures company, headquarters is based in Gurgaon, India. Their products include Inverter, Batteries, Solar off-grid and battery. Since July 1, 2022 Preeti Bajaj is MD and CEO of Luminous Power Technologies. Indian former cricketer Sachin Tendulkar is brand ambassador of LPT since May 2010.

== History ==
Luminous Power Technologies was founded in 1988 by engineering graduate Rakesh Malhotra. Luminous was seeded with 4 people in 600 sq ft space in South Delhi.

In 2011, French company Schneider Electric acquired a 74% stake of Luminous Power.

In April 2022, wires and cables manufacturer RR Kabel Ltd. acquired Luminous Power's Home Electrical Business (HEB) from Schneider Electric.

== See also ==
- Electric power
- Battery
- Inverter
