= Sandeep Sharma =

Indian cricketer (born 1993)

Personal information
- Full name: Sandeep Sharma
- Born: 18 May 1993 (age 33); Patiala, Punjab, India
- Batting: Right-handed
- Bowling: Right-arm fast medium
- Role: Bowler

International information
- National side: India
- T20I debut (cap 54): 17 July 2015 v Zimbabwe
- Last T20I: 19 July 2015 v Zimbabwe
- T20I shirt no.: 66

Domestic team information
- Years: Team
- 2011–2021: Punjab
- 2013–2017, 2022: Punjab Kings (squad no. 66)
- 2018–2021: Sunrisers Hyderabad (squad no. 66)
- 2022: Chandigarh
- 2023-present: Rajasthan Royals

Career statistics
Competition	T20I	FC	LA	T20
Matches	2	55	74	197
Runs scored	1	630	219	111
Batting average	–	10.32	14.60	11.10
100s/50s	0/0	0/1	0/0	0/0
Top score	1*	51	26*	13*
Balls bowled	42	10,589	3,860	4,317
Wickets	1	186	112	215
Bowling average	73.00	28.04	27.83	25.50
5 wickets in innings	0	11	4	1
10 wickets in match	0	1	0	0
Best bowling	1/39	7/25	7/19	5/18
Catches/stumpings	0/–	15/–	26/–	44/–
- Source: ESPNcricinfo, 28 March 2025

Sandeep Sharma (born 18 May 1993) is an Indian cricketer who plays domestic cricket for Chandigarh and the Rajasthan Royals in the IPL. He is a right-arm medium pace bowler. Sharma has represented India at two Under-19 World Cups – 2010 and 2012. He was a key member of the Indian under-19 team which emerged as winners of the 2012 Under-19 Cricket World Cup. He was signed up by Kings XI Punjab in 2013 following his bowling performances at the 2012 Under-19 World Cup. He has built a reputation for bowling yorkers and for his ability to swing the ball. His bowling style is often compared to that of another former Indian bowler Praveen Kumar. Sandeep Sharma has showcased his consistency and effectiveness as a bowler throughout the years in IPL and is often considered as underrated despite his performances.

== Early career ==
Sandeep began his career as a batsman for his school in Patiala before being convinced by his coach to switch to seam bowling. He played a huge role in India's victory over hosts Australia during the 2012 ICC Under-19 Cricket World Cup final where he was the pick of the bowlers in the final claiming four wickets in a ten-over spell which included two maidens conceding 58 runs and his bowling spell restricted Australia to 225/8 before India chased down the total comfortably by six wickets. He dismissed future Australian Internationals Cameron Bancroft and Ashton Turner. He was also the joint highest wicket-taker for India with 12 scalps at the 2012 Under-19 Cricket World Cup.

By the age of 21, Sandeep had gained a reputation as a swing bowler. He also received praise from former Australian wicketkeeper-batsman Adam Gilchrist for his ability to hoop the ball around. Bharat Arun and Ramakrishnan Sridhar coached him during his formative years at the National Cricket Academy. He also appeared with ONGC in DDCA tournaments.

== Indian Premier League ==
Sharma took three wickets for 21 runs on his IPL debut match when he played for Kings XI Punjab against Sunrisers Hyderabad on 11 May 2013. He enjoyed a stellar run during the 2014 Indian Premier League season with Kings XI Punjab taking 18 wickets in 11 matches and was also the leading wicket-taker for Kings XI Punjab during that season. During his tenure Kings XI Punjab competed in their first ever IPL final which they eventually lost to Kolkata Knight Riders.

In the 2017 edition of the IPL, Sharma claimed 3/22 from his four overs against Royal Challengers Bangalore and in the process became the first bowler to get the trio of Chris Gayle, Virat Kohli and AB de Villiers out in the same game. He spent his first six IPL seasons with Kings XI Punjab with whom he gained fair share of success by grabbing 73 wickets including 40 wickets in the powerplay overs while taking 20 wickets in the death overs. He picked up 39 wickets in his first three IPL seasons which eventually got him an Indian call-up.

In January 2018, he was bought by the Sunrisers Hyderabad in the 2018 IPL auction. In February 2022, he was bought by the Punjab Kings in the auction for the 2022 Indian Premier League tournament. In March 2023, he was brought in by Rajasthan Royals for the 2023 Indian Premier League as an injury replacement for Prasidh Krishna after initially being unsold in the 2023 IPL Auction. He made his comeback in 2023 IPL season as he was tasked as the main reliable frontline bowler for Rajasthan Royals to deliver in the powerplay and in the death. He holds the record of being the second best bowler in powerplay overs in the history of IPL with a tally of 55 wickets only second behind Bhuvneshwar Kumar. He featured in the 1000th IPL match and in the match against Mumbai Indians, he dismissed Mumbai Indians captain Rohit Sharma for the fifth time in his IPL career.

== International career ==
After his impressive domestic season with Punjab and Kings XI Punjab, Sharma was picked in the 15-man squad for the limited overs tour of Zimbabwe in July 2015. He made his Twenty20 International debut against Zimbabwe on 17 July 2015. However, he was not able to live up to the expectations in both the T20Is against Zimbabwe where he leaked many runs. He also endured several back injuries and shoulder problems which eventually cut short his international career. He suffered a stress fracture followed by a shoulder injury which kept him out of the sport for roughly 18 months.
