= 2024 Lucknow Super Giants season =

2024 Indian Premier League cricket team

Lucknow Super Giants
2024 season
- Coach: Justin Langer
- Captain: KL Rahul
- Ground(s): Ekana Cricket Stadium, Lucknow
- IPL League: Finished at 7th place
- Most catches: Nicholas Pooran (7)
- Most wicket-keeping dismissals: KL Rahul (16)

The 2024 season was the 3rd season for the Indian Premier League franchise Lucknow Super Giants. The Super Giants were one of the ten teams competed in the 2024 Indian Premier League. They finished at the 4th place in previous season after losing the Eliminator to Mumbai Indians. The Lucknow Super Giants drew an average home attendance of 47,795 in the IPL in 2024.

After Hyderabad's abandoned match on 16 May 2024, Lucknow was eliminated from the 2024 Indian Premier League for the first time since their debut. They finished the League stage at the 7th place with 7 wins and 7 losses, garnering 14 points.

== Squad ==
- Source: ESPNcricinfo
- Players with international caps are listed in **bold**.
- * denotes a player who was unavailable for rest of the season.

Lucknow Super Giants squad for the 2024 Indian Premier League
No.	Name	Nat	Birth date	Batting style	Bowling style	Signed year	Salary	Notes
Captain
1	**KL Rahul**	(India)	18 April 1992 (aged 31)	Right-handed	Right-arm medium	2022	₹17 crore (US$1.8 million)	Wicket-keeper
Batters
3	Ayush Badoni	(India)	3 December 1999 (aged 24)	Right-handed	Right-arm off break	2022	₹20 lakh (US$21,000)	
37	**Devdutt Padikkal**	(India)	7 July 2000 (aged 23)	Left-handed	Right-arm off break	2023	₹7.75 crore (US$800,000)	Traded (Note: Ahead of the 2024 auction, Devdutt Padikkal was traded from Rajasthan Royals to Lucknow.)
70	**Ashton Turner**	(Australia)	25 January 1993 (aged 31)	Right-handed	Right-arm off break	2023	₹1.00 crore (US$100,000)	Overseas
Wicket-keepers
12	**Quinton de Kock**	(South Africa)	17 December 1992 (aged 31)	Left-handed	—N/a	2022	₹6.75 crore (US$700,000)	Overseas
29	**Nicholas Pooran**	(Cricket West Indies)	2 October 1995 (aged 28)	Left-handed	Right-arm off break	2023	₹16 crore (US$1.7 million)	Overseas; Vice captain
All-rounders
20	Arshad Khan	(India)	20 December 1997 (aged 26)	Left-handed	Left-arm medium	2023	₹20 lakh (US$21,000)	
33	Arshin Kulkarni	(India)	15 February 2005 (aged 19)	Right-handed	Right-arm medium	2023	₹20 lakh (US$21,000)	
—N/a	**David Willey**	(England)	28 February 1990 (aged 34)	Left-handed	Left-arm fast-medium	2023	₹2 crore (US$210,000)	Overseas; Withdrawn (Note: Matt Henry replaced David Willey, after the latter withdrew due to Personal reasons.)
7	**Krishnappa Gowtham**	(India)	20 October 1988 (aged 35)	Right-handed	Right-arm off break	2022	₹90 lakh (US$93,000)	
17	**Marcus Stoinis**	(Australia)	16 August 1989 (aged 34)	Right-handed	Right-arm medium	2022	₹9.2 crore (US$960,000)	Overseas
24	**Krunal Pandya**	(India)	24 March 1991 (aged 32)	Left-handed	Left-arm orthodox	2022	₹8.25 crore (US$860,000)	
71	**Kyle Mayers**	(Cricket West Indies)	8 September 1992 (aged 31)	Left-handed	Right-arm medium	2022	₹50 lakh (US$52,000)	Overseas
57	**Deepak Hooda**	(India)	19 April 1995 (aged 28)	Right-handed	Right-arm off break	2022	₹5.75 crore (US$600,000)	
46	Prerak Mankad	(India)	23 April 1994 (aged 29)	Right-handed	Right-arm medium	2023	₹20 lakh (US$21,000)	
Pace bowlers
33	**Mark Wood**	(England)	11 January 1990 (aged 34)	Right-handed	Right-arm fast	2023	₹7.5 crore (US$780,000)	Overseas; Withdrawn (Note: Shamar Joseph replaced Mark Wood, after the latter withdrew due to Workload management.)
34	Yudhvir Singh	(India)	13 September 1997 (aged 26)	Right-handed	Right-arm medium	2023	₹20 lakh (US$21,000)	
47	Mohsin Khan	(India)	15 July 1998 (aged 25)	Left-handed	Left-arm medium-fast	2022	₹20 lakh (US$21,000)	
32	**Shivam Mavi**	(India)	26 November 1998 (aged 25)	Right-handed	Right-arm fast	2024	₹6.40 crore (US$660,000)	
9	Yash Thakur	(India)	28 December 1998 (aged 25)	Right-handed	Right-arm medium-fast	2023	₹45 lakh (US$47,000)	
78	**Naveen-ul-Haq**	(Afghanistan)	23 September 1999 (aged 24)	Right-handed	Right-arm medium-fast	2023	₹50 lakh (US$52,000)	Overseas
8	Mayank Yadav	(India)	17 June 2002 (aged 21)	Right-handed	Right-arm fast	2022	₹20 lakh (US$21,000)	Withdrawn (Note: Mayank Yadav withdrew due to Injury.)
21	**Matt Henry**	(New Zealand)	14 December 1991 (aged 32)	Right-handed	Right-arm fast-medium	2024	₹1.25 crore (US$130,000)	Overseas; Replacement
63	**Shamar Joseph**	(Cricket West Indies)	31 August 1999 (aged 24)	Left-handed	Right-arm fast	2024	₹3 crore (US$310,000)	Overseas; Replacement
Spin bowlers
99	**Amit Mishra**	(India)	24 November 1982 (aged 41)	Right-handed	Right-arm leg spin	2023	₹50 lakh (US$52,000)	
30	Manimaran Siddharth	(India)	3 July 1998 (aged 25)	Right-handed	Slow left arm orthodox	2023	₹2.4 crore (US$250,000)	
56	**Ravi Bishnoi**	(India)	5 September 2000 (aged 23)	Right-handed	Right-arm leg spin	2022	₹4 crore (US$420,000)	

== Administration and support staff ==
Position	Name
CEO	Vinod Bisht
Team manager	Saumyadeep Pyne
Head coach	Justin Langer
Batting coach	Sridharan Sriram
Bowling coach	Morne Morkel
Fielding coach	Jonty Rhodes

== Sponsors ==
- Main shirt sponsor: My11Circle
- Back shirt sponsor: BKT
- Chest branding: Greenply

== League stage ==
=== Points table ===
Pos	Grp	Team	Pld	W	L	NR	Pts	NRR	Qualification
1	A	Kolkata Knight Riders (C)	14	9	3	2	20	1.428	Advanced to Qualifier 1
2	B	Sunrisers Hyderabad (R)	14	8	5	1	17	0.414	Advanced to Qualifier 1
3	A	Rajasthan Royals (3rd)	14	8	5	1	17	0.273	Advanced to Eliminator
4	B	Royal Challengers Bengaluru (4th)	14	7	7	0	14	0.459	Advanced to Eliminator
5	B	Chennai Super Kings	14	7	7	0	14	0.392	Eliminated
6	A	Delhi Capitals	14	7	7	0	14	−0.377	Eliminated
7	A	Lucknow Super Giants	14	7	7	0	14	−0.667	Eliminated
8	B	Gujarat Titans	14	5	7	2	12	−1.063	Eliminated
9	B	Punjab Kings	14	5	9	0	10	−0.353	Eliminated
10	A	Mumbai Indians	14	4	10	0	8	−0.318	Eliminated

Source: ESPNcricinfo
(C) Champions; (R) Runners-up

=== League progression ===
League progression
Team	Group matches														Playoffs		
Team	1	2	3	4	5	6	7	8	9	10	11	12	13	14	Q1/E	Q2	F
Lucknow Super Giants	0	2	4	6	6	6	8	10	10	12	12	12	12	14			

Win	Loss	No result

- Note: The total points at the end of each group match are listed.
- Note: Click on the points (group matches) or W/L (playoffs) to see the match summary.

=== Fixtures and results ===
Match 4
24 March 2024
15:30 (D/N)
Scorecard

(H) Rajasthan Royals; 193/4 (20 overs)	v	Lucknow Super Giants; 173/6 (20 overs)
Sanju Samson 82* (52); Naveen-ul-Haq 2/41 (4 overs)		Nicholas Pooran 64* (41); Trent Boult 2/35 (4 overs)

Rajasthan Royals won by 20 runs
Sawai Mansingh Stadium, Jaipur
Umpires: Kumar Dharmasena (SL) and Akshay Totre (Ind)
Player of the match: Sanju Samson (Rajasthan Royals)

- Rajasthan Royals won the toss and elected to bat.

Match 11
30 March 2024
19:30 (N)
Scorecard

(H) Lucknow Super Giants; 199/8 (20 overs)	v	Punjab Kings; 178/5 (20 overs)
Quinton de Kock 54 (38); Sam Curran 3/28 (4 overs)		Shikhar Dhawan 70 (50); Mayank Yadav 3/27 (4 overs)

Lucknow Super Giants won by 21 runs
BRSABV Ekana Cricket Stadium, Lucknow
Umpires: Jayaraman Madanagopal (Ind) and Navdeep Singh (Ind)
Player of the match: Mayank Yadav (Lucknow Super Giants)

- Lucknow Super Giants won the toss and elected to bat.

Match 15
2 April 2024
19:30 (N)
Scorecard

Lucknow Super Giants; 181/5 (20 overs)	v	Royal Challengers Bengaluru (H); 153 (19.4 overs)
Quinton de Kock 81 (56); Glenn Maxwell 2/23 (4 overs)		Mahipal Lomror 33 (13); Mayank Yadav 3/14 (4 overs)

Lucknow Super Giants won by 28 runs
M. Chinnaswamy Stadium, Bengaluru
Umpires: Jayaraman Madanagopal (Ind) and Nikhil Patwardhan (Ind)
Player of the match: Mayank Yadav (Lucknow Super Giants)

- Royal Challengers Bengaluru won the toss and elected to field.

Match 21
7 April 2024
19:30 (N)
Scorecard

(H) Lucknow Super Giants; 163/5 (20 overs)	v	Gujarat Titans; 130 (18.5 overs)
Marcus Stoinis 58 (43); Darshan Nalkande 2/21 (2 overs)		Sai Sudharsan 31 (23); Yash Thakur 5/30 (3.5 overs)

Lucknow Super Giants won by 33 runs
BRSABV Ekana Cricket Stadium, Lucknow
Umpires: Nand Kishore (Ind) and Virender Sharma (Ind)
Player of the match: Yash Thakur (Lucknow Super Giants)

- Lucknow Super Giants won the toss and elected to bat.

Match 26
12 April 2024
19:30 (N)
Scorecard

(H) Lucknow Super Giants; 167/7 (20 overs)	v	Delhi Capitals; 170/4 (18.1 overs)
Ayush Badoni 55* (35); Kuldeep Yadav 3/20 (4 overs)		Jake Fraser-McGurk 55 (35); Ravi Bishnoi 2/25 (4 overs)

Delhi Capitals won by 6 wickets
BRSABV Ekana Cricket Stadium, Lucknow
Umpires: Yeshwant Barde (Ind) and Rohan Pandit (Ind)
Player of the match: Kuldeep Yadav (Delhi Capitals)

- Lucknow Super Giants won the toss and elected to bat.

Match 28
14 April 2024
15:30 (D/N)
Scorecard

Lucknow Super Giants; 161/7 (20 overs)	v	Kolkata Knight Riders (H); 162/2 (15.4 overs)
Nicholas Pooran 45 (32); Mitchell Starc 3/28 (4 overs)		Phil Salt 89* (47); Mohsin Khan 2/29 (4 overs)

Kolkata Knight Riders won by 8 wickets
Eden Gardens, Kolkata
Umpires: Vinod Seshan (Ind) and Akshay Totre (Ind)
Player of the match: Phil Salt (Kolkata Knight Riders)

- Kolkata Knight Riders won the toss and elected to field.

Match 34
19 April 2024
19:30 (N)
Scorecard

Chennai Super Kings; 176/6 (20 overs)	v	Lucknow Super Giants (H); 180/2 (19 overs)
Ravindra Jadeja 57* (40); Krunal Pandya 2/16 (3 overs)		KL Rahul 82 (53); Matheesha Pathirana 1/29 (4 overs)

Lucknow Super Giants won by 8 wickets
BRSABV Ekana Cricket Stadium, Lucknow
Umpires: Anil Chaudhary (Ind) and Rohan Pandit (Ind)
Player of the match: KL Rahul (Lucknow Super Giants)

- Lucknow Super Giants won the toss and elected to field.

Match 39
23 April 2024
19:30 (N)
Scorecard

(H) Chennai Super Kings; 210/4 (20 overs)	v	Lucknow Super Giants; 213/4 (19.3 overs)
Ruturaj Gaikwad 108* (60); Matt Henry 1/28 (4 overs)		Marcus Stoinis 124* (63); Matheesha Pathirana 2/35 (4 overs)

Lucknow Super Giants won by 6 wickets
M. A. Chidambaram Stadium, Chennai
Umpires: Nikhil Patwardhan (Ind) and Tapan Sharma (Ind)
Player of the match: Marcus Stoinis (Lucknow Super Giants)

- Lucknow Super Giants won the toss and elected to field.

Match 44
27 April 2024
19:30 (N)
Scorecard

(H) Lucknow Super Giants; 196/5 (20 overs)	v	Rajasthan Royals; 199/3 (19 overs)
KL Rahul 76 (48); Sandeep Sharma 2/31 (4 overs)		Sanju Samson 71* (33); Marcus Stoinis 1/3 (1 over)

Rajasthan Royals won by 7 wickets
BRSABV Ekana Cricket Stadium, Lucknow
Umpires: K. N. Ananthapadmanabhan (Ind) and Michael Gough (Eng)
Player of the match: Sanju Samson (Rajasthan Royals)

- Rajasthan Royals won the toss and elected to field.

Match 48
30 April 2024
19:30 (N)
Scorecard

Mumbai Indians; 144/7 (20 overs)	v	Lucknow Super Giants (H); 145/6 (19.2 overs)
Nehal Wadhera 46 (41); Mohsin Khan 2/36 (4 overs)		Marcus Stoinis 62 (45); Hardik Pandya 2/26 (4 overs)

Lucknow Super Giants won by 4 wickets
BRSABV Ekana Cricket Stadium, Lucknow
Umpires: Ulhas Gandhe (Ind) and Michael Gough (Eng)
Player of the match: Marcus Stoinis (Lucknow Super Giants)

- Lucknow Super Giants won the toss and elected to field.

Match 54
5 May 2024
19:30 (N)
Scorecard

Kolkata Knight Riders; 235/6 (20 overs)	v	Lucknow Super Giants (H); 137 (16.1 overs)
Sunil Narine 81 (39); Naveen-ul-Haq 3/49 (4 overs)		Marcus Stoinis 36 (21); Harshit Rana 3/24 (3.1 overs)

Kolkata Knight Riders won by 98 runs
BRSABV Ekana Cricket Stadium, Lucknow
Umpires: Yeshwant Barde (Ind) and Saidharshan Kumar (Ind)
Player of the match: Sunil Narine (Kolkata Knight Riders)

- Lucknow Super Giants won the toss and elected to field.

Match 57
8 May 2024
19:30 (N)
Scorecard

Lucknow Super Giants; 165/4 (20 overs)	v	Sunrisers Hyderabad (H); 167/0 (9.4 overs)
Ayush Badoni 55* (30); Bhuvneshwar Kumar 2/12 (4 overs)		Travis Head 89* (30)

Sunrisers Hyderabad won by 10 wickets
Rajiv Gandhi International Cricket Stadium, Hyderabad
Umpires: Yeshwant Barde (Ind) and Saidharshan Kumar (Ind)
Player of the match: Travis Head (Sunrisers Hyderabad)

- Lucknow Super Giants won the toss and elected to bat.
- Mumbai Indians were eliminated from the playoffs as a result of this match.

Match 64
14 May 2024
19:30 (N)
Scorecard

(H) Delhi Capitals; 208/4 (20 overs)	v	Lucknow Super Giants; 189/9 (20 overs)
Abishek Porel 58 (33); Naveen-ul-Haq 2/51 (4 overs)		Nicholas Pooran 61 (27); Ishant Sharma 3/34 (4 overs)

Delhi Capitals won by 19 runs
Arun Jaitley Stadium, Delhi
Umpires: Vinod Seshan (Ind) and Akshay Totre (Ind)
Player of the match: Ishant Sharma (Delhi Capitals)

- Lucknow Super Giants won the toss and elected to field.
- Rajasthan Royals qualified for the playoffs as a result of this match.

Match 67
17 May 2024
19:30 (N)
Scorecard

Lucknow Super Giants; 214/6 (20 overs)	v	Mumbai Indians (H); 196/6 (20 overs)
Nicholas Pooran 75 (29); Nuwan Thushara 3/28 (4 overs)		Rohit Sharma 68 (38); Ravi Bishnoi 2/37 (4 overs)

Lucknow Super Giants won by 18 runs
Wankhede Stadium, Mumbai
Umpires: Rohan Pandit (Ind) and Navdeep Singh (Ind)
Player of the match: Nicholas Pooran (Lucknow Super Giants)

- Mumbai Indians won the toss and elected to field.

== Statistics ==
=== Most runs ===
Runs	Player	Inns	HS	Ave	SR	100s/50s	4s	6s
465	(India) KL Rahul	13	82	35.76	136.36	0/3	42	16
363	(Cricket West Indies) Nicholas Pooran	12	64*	60.50	162.05	0/1	24	24
360	(Australia) Marcus Stoinis	13	124*	36.00	150.00	1/2	34	16
250	(South Africa) Quinton de Kock	11	81	22.72	134.40	0/3	29	9
207	(India) Ayush Badoni	10	55*	29.57	136.18	0/2	21	3
Last updated: 14 May 2024, Source: ESPNcricinfo

=== Most wickets ===
Wkts.	Player	Inns	Ov	Runs	BBI	Ave	Econ	SR	4W	5W
12	(Afghanistan) Naveen ul Haq	9	32.3	322	3/49	26.83	9.90	16.25	0	0
11	(India) Yash Thakur	10	35.3	402	5/30	36.54	11.32	19.36	0	1
9	(India) Mohsin Khan	9	34.0	340	2/29	37.77	10.00	22.66	0	0
8	(India) Ravi Bishnoi	13	39.4	346	2/25	43.25	8.72	29.75	0	0
7	(India) Mayank Yadav	4	12.1	85	3/14	12.14	6.98	10.42	0	0
Last updated: 8 May 2024, Source: ESPNcricinfo
