= 2023 Lucknow Super Giants season =

Overview of Lucknow Super Giants in 2023

Lucknow Super Giants
2023 season
- Coach: Andy Flower
- Captain: KL Rahul
- Ground(s): BRSABV Ekana Cricket Stadium, Lucknow

Lucknow Super Giants is a franchise cricket team based in Lucknow, Uttar Pradesh. The 2023 season was the second season for the Indian Premier League franchise Lucknow Super Giants, one of the ten teams that competed in the 2023 competition.

== Administration and support staff ==
| Position | Name |
|---|---|
| CEO | Raghu Iyer |
| Head coach | Andy Flower |
| Assistant coach | Vijay Dahiya |
| Mentor | Gautam Gambhir |
| Bowling coach | Morné Morkel |
| Fielding coach | Jonty Rhodes |
| Strength and conditioning coach | Warren Andrews |

== Squad ==
- Players with international caps are listed in **bold**
- Ages are given as of 31 March 2023, the date of the first match in the tournament

| No. | Name | Nationality | Birth date | Batting style | Bowling style | Year signed | Notes |
Captain
| 1 | **KL Rahul** | India | 18 April 1992 (aged 30) | Right-handed | Right-arm medium | 2022 | |
Batters
| 19 | Manan Vohra | India | 18 July 1993 (age 28) | Right-handed | Right-arm medium | 2022 | |
| 11 | Ayush Badoni | India | 3 December 1999 (age 23) | Right-handed | Right-arm off spin | 2022 | |
All-rounders
| 17 | **Marcus Stoinis** | Australia | 16 August 1989 (aged 33) | Right-handed | Right-arm medium | 2022 | Overseas |
| 25 | **Krunal Pandya** | India | 24 March 1991 (age 30 years) | Left-handed | Left-arm orthodox | 2022 | Vice-Captain |
| 57 | **Deepak Hooda** | India | 19 April 1995 (age 26 years) | Right-handed | Right-arm off break | 2022 | |
| 7 | **Krishnappa Gowtham** | India | 20 October 1988 (age 33 years) | Right-handed | Right-arm off-break | 2022 | |
| 71 | **Kyle Mayers** | West Indies | 8 September 1992 (age 29 years) | Left-handed | Right-arm medium | 2022 | Overseas |
| 95 | **Daniel Sams** | Australia | 27 October 1992 (aged 30) | Right-handed | Left-arm fast-medium | 2023 | Overseas |
| 24 | Karan Sharma | India | 31 October 1998 (age 23 years) | Right handed | Right-arm offbreak | 2022 | |
| 46 | Prerak Mankad | India | 23 April 1994 (aged 28) | Right-handed | Right-arm medium | 2023 | |
Wicket-keepers
| 12 | **Quinton de Kock** | South Africa | 17 December 1992 (aged 30) | Left-handed | – | 2022 | Overseas |
| 29 | **Nicholas Pooran** | West Indies | 2 October 1995 (aged 27) | Left-handed | Right-arm off break | 2023 | Overseas |
Spin bowlers
| 99 | **Amit Mishra** | India | 24 November 1982 (aged 40) | Right-handed | Right-arm leg spin | 2023 | |
| 56 | **Ravi Bishnoi** | India | 5 September 2000 (aged 22) | Right-handed | Right-arm leg break | 2022 | |
| 15 | Swapnil Singh | India | 22 January 1991 (aged 32) | Right-handed | Left-arm orthodox | 2023 | |
Pace bowlers
| 33 | **Mark Wood** | England | 11 January 1990 (aged 33) | Right-handed | Right-arm fast | 2022 | Overseas |
| 91 | **Jaydev Unadkat** | India | 18 October 1991 (aged 31) | Right-handed | Left-arm fast-medium | 2023 | |
| 48 | **Romario Shepherd** | West Indies | 26 November 1994 (aged 28) | Right-handed | Right-arm medium-fast | 2023 | Overseas |
| 6 | **Avesh Khan** | India | 13 December 1996 (aged 26) | Right-handed | Right-arm fast | 2022 | |
| 78 | **Naveen-ul-Haq** | Afghanistan | 23 September 1999 (aged 23) | Right-handed | Right-arm medium-fast | 2023 | Overseas |
| 34 | Yudhvir Singh | India | 13 September 1997 (aged 25) | Right-handed | Right-arm medium | 2023 | |
| 47 | Mohsin Khan | India | 15 July 1998 (aged 24) | Left-handed | Left-arm medium-fast | 2022 | |
| 9 | Yash Thakur | India | 28 December 1998 (aged 24) | Right-handed | Right-arm medium-fast | 2023 | |
| 8 | Mayank Yadav | India | 17 June 2002 (aged 20) | Right-handed | Right-arm fast medium | 2022 | |

- Source: CricBuzz
