= 2025 Lucknow Super Giants season =

Indian Premier League cricket team

Lucknow Super Giants
2025 season
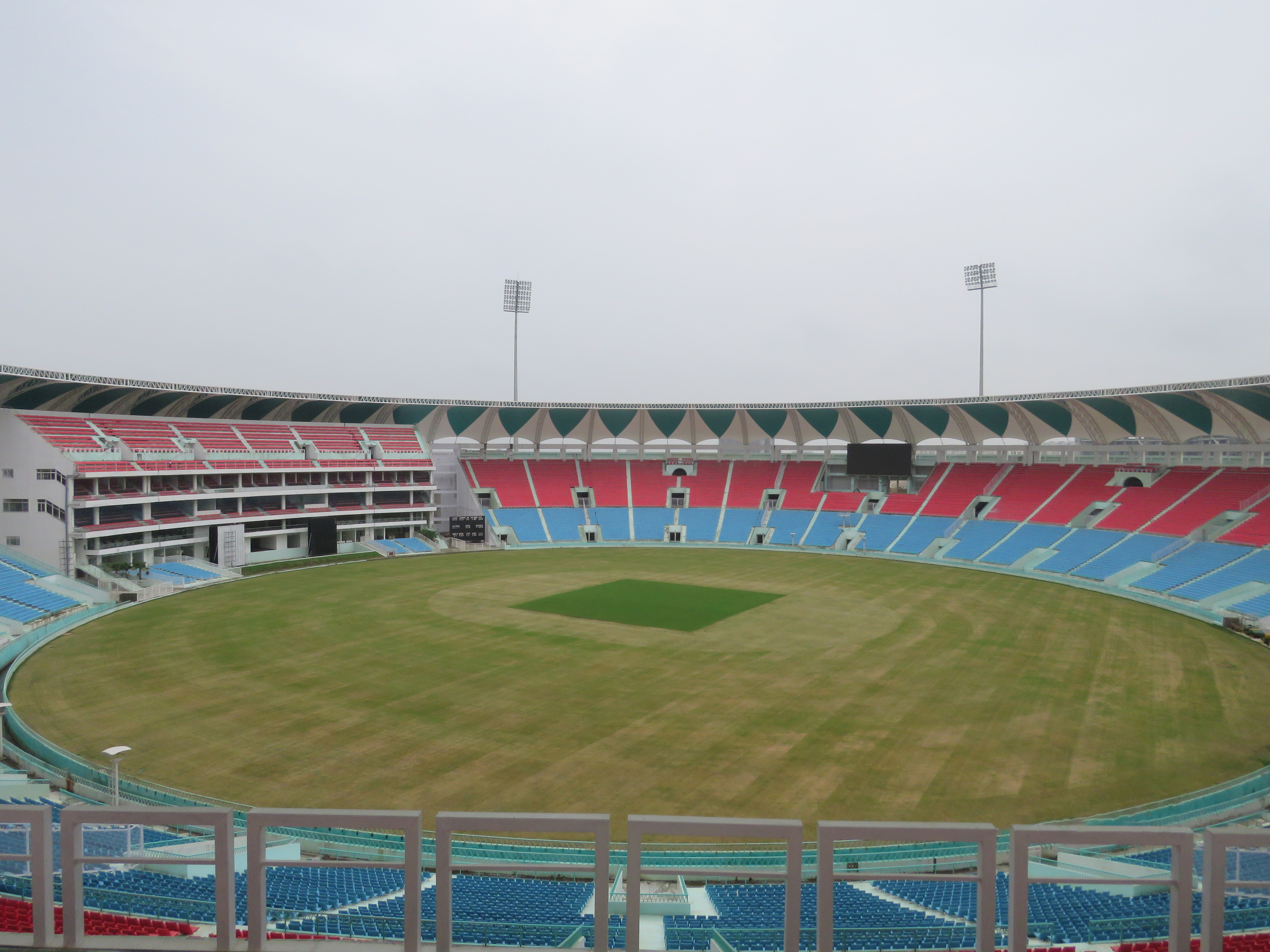
- Ekana Cricket Stadium, home ground of Lucknow Super Giants
- Coach: Justin Langer
- Captain: Rishabh Pant
- Ground(s): Ekana Cricket Stadium, Lucknow
- League stage: 7th place
- Most runs: Mitchell Marsh (627)
- Most wickets: Digvesh Rathi (14)
- Most catches: Rishabh Pant (6)
- Most wicket-keeping dismissals: Digvesh Rathi (3)

The 2025 season was the 4th season for the Indian Premier League (IPL) cricket franchise Lucknow Super Giants. They were one of the ten teams that competed in the 2025 IPL. Ahead of the season, Rishabh Pant was appointed as the captain. The team was coached by Justin Langer.

Lucknow Super Giants were the fifth team to be eliminated from the 2025 IPL and finished the season in seventh place with six wins from 14 matches. Mitchell Marsh scored the most runs (627) while Digvesh Rathi took the most wickets (14) for Lucknow in the 2025 season.

== Pre-season ==
The 2025 Indian Premier League was the 18th edition of the Indian Premier League (IPL), a professional Twenty20 (T20) cricket league, organised by the Board of Control for Cricket in India (BCCI). Lucknow Super Giants were one of the four active franchises to not have won the IPL title prior to 2025. The team finished in seventh place in the previous season. The tournament featured ten teams competing in 74 matches from 22 March to 3 June 2025. Lucknow played all their home matches at Ekana Cricket Stadium.

=== Player retention ===
Franchises were allowed to retain a maximum of six players from their squad, including a maximum of five recent international players. Franchises were required to submit their retention lists before 31 October 2024. Lucknow retained five players, but did not retain their prior captain KL Rahul.

Retained players
| No. | Player | Salary |
|---|---|---|
| 1 | Nicholas Pooran | ₹21 crore (US$2.2 million) |
| 2 | Ravi Bishnoi | ₹11 crore (US$1.1 million) |
| 3 | Mayank Yadav | ₹11 crore (US$1.1 million) |
| 4 | Mohsin Khan | ₹4 crore (US$420,000) |
| 5 | Ayush Badoni | ₹4 crore (US$420,000) |

Released players
| Batters | Wicket-keepers | All-rounders | Fast bowlers | Spin bowlers |
|---|---|---|---|---|
| Devdutt Padikkal; Ashton Turner | KL Rahul; Quinton de Kock | Arshad Khan; Arshin Kulkarni; David Willey; Krishnappa Gowtham; Marcus Stoinis; Krunal Pandya; Kyle Mayers; Deepak Hooda; Prerak Mankad | Mark Wood; Yudhvir Singh; Shivam Mavi; Yash Thakur; Naveen-ul-Haq; Matt Henry; Shamar Joseph | Amit Mishra; Manimaran Siddharth |

=== Auction ===
The season's auction took place on 24 and 25 November 2024 in Jeddah, Saudi Arabia. The auction purse for each franchise was set at ₹120 crore (US$12 million), with the franchises being deducted an amount from the purse for each retained player. Lucknow had a purse remaining of ₹69 crore (US$7.2 million). Franchises that did not retain six players, were allowed Right-to-Match (RTM) cards at the auction for each player not retained. Lucknow had one card available. Lucknow bought nineteen players in the auction, including nine capped players and six overseas players. Lucknow used their RTM card to buy back Shamar Joseph for ₹75 lakh (US$78,000).

== Squad ==
- Players with international caps as of start of 2025 IPL are listed in **bold**.
- Ages are as of 22 March 2025.
- Withdrawn players are indicated by a dagger symbol (†) and placed at the bottom of the table.

Lucknow Super Giants squad for the 2025 Indian Premier League
| S/N | Name | Nationality | Birth date | Batting style | Bowling style | Salary | Notes |
|---|---|---|---|---|---|---|---|
| 1 | Abdul Samad | India | 28 October 2001 (aged 23) | Right-handed | Right-arm leg break | ₹4.2 crore (US$440,000) | |
| 3 | Ayush Badoni | India | 3 December 1999 (aged 25) | Right-handed | Right-arm off break | ₹4 crore (US$420,000) | |
| 6 | **Avesh Khan** | India | 13 December 1996 (aged 28) | Right-handed | Right-arm medium-fast | ₹9.75 crore (US$1.0 million) | |
| 8 | **Mitchell Marsh** | Australia | 20 October 1991 (aged 33) | Right-handed | Right-arm medium-fast | ₹3.4 crore (US$350,000) | Overseas |
| 10 | **David Miller** | South Africa | 10 June 1989 (aged 35) | Left-handed | Right-arm off break | ₹7.5 crore (US$780,000) | Overseas |
| 17 | **Rishabh Pant** | India | 4 October 1997 (aged 27) | Left-handed | —N/a | ₹27 crore (US$2.8 million) | Captain |
| 21 | **Shahbaz Ahmed** | India | 11 December 1994 (aged 30) | Left-handed | Left-arm orthodox | ₹2.4 crore (US$250,000) | |
| 25 | Prince Yadav | India | 12 December 2001 (aged 23) | Right-handed | Right-arm medium-fast | ₹30 lakh (US$31,000) | |
| 29 | **Nicholas Pooran** | West Indies | 2 October 1995 (aged 29) | Left-handed | —N/a | ₹21 crore (US$2.2 million) | Overseas |
| 30 | Manimaran Siddharth | India | 3 July 1998 (aged 26) | Right-handed | Left-arm orthodox | ₹75 lakh (US$78,000) | |
| 33 | Arshin Kulkarni | India | 15 February 2005 (aged 20) | Right-handed | Right-arm medium-fast | ₹30 lakh (US$31,000) | |
| 54 | **Shardul Thakur** | India | 16 October 1991 (aged 33) | Right-handed | Right-arm medium | ₹2 crore (US$210,000) | Replacement (Note: Shardul Thakur replaced Mohsin Khan, after the latter withdrew due to ACL tear.) |
| 56 | **Ravi Bishnoi** | India | 5 September 2000 (aged 24) | Right-handed | Right-arm leg break | ₹11 crore (US$1.1 million) | |
| 63 | **Shamar Joseph** | West Indies | 31 August 1999 (aged 25) | Left-handed | Right-arm medium-fast | ₹75 lakh (US$78,000) | Overseas |
| 74 | Digvesh Rathi | India | 15 December 1999 (aged 25) | Right-handed | Right-arm leg break | ₹30 lakh (US$31,000) | |
| 94 | **Aiden Markram** | South Africa | 4 October 1994 (aged 30) | Right-handed | Right-arm off break | ₹2 crore (US$210,000) | Overseas |
| —N/a | **Matthew Breetzke** | South Africa | 3 November 1998 (aged 26) | Right-handed | Right-arm medium | ₹75 lakh (US$78,000) | Overseas |
| —N/a | Yuvraj Chaudhary | India | 6 October 2001 (aged 23) | Left-handed | Left-arm orthodox | ₹30 lakh (US$31,000) | |
| —N/a | **Akash Deep** | India | 15 December 1996 (aged 28) | Right-handed | Right-arm medium-fast | ₹8 crore (US$830,000) | |
| —N/a | Rajvardhan Hangargekar | India | 10 November 2002 (aged 22) | Right-handed | Right-arm medium-fast | ₹30 lakh (US$31,000) | |
| —N/a | Aryan Juyal | India | 11 November 2001 (aged 23) | Right-handed | —N/a | ₹30 lakh (US$31,000) | |
| —N/a | **Will O'Rourke** | New Zealand | 6 August 2001 (aged 23) | Right-handed | Right-arm fast | ₹3 crore (US$310,000) | Overseas; temporary (Note: Lucknow Super Giants signed Will O'Rourke as temporary replacement, following the IPL's suspension and rescheduling.) replacement (Note: Will O'Rourke replaced Mayank Yadav, after the latter withdrew due to back injury.) |
| —N/a | Akash Singh | India | 26 April 2002 (aged 22) | Right-handed | Left-arm medium-fast | ₹30 lakh (US$31,000) | |
| —N/a | Himmat Singh | India | 8 November 1996 (aged 28) | Right-handed | Right-arm off break | ₹30 lakh (US$31,000) | |
| 47 | Mohsin Khan † | India | 15 July 1998 (aged 26) | Left-handed | Left-arm medium-fast | ₹4 crore (US$420,000) | Withdrawn |
| —N/a | **Mayank Yadav** † | India | 17 June 2002 (aged 22) | Right-handed | Right-arm medium-fast | ₹11 crore (US$1.1 million) | Withdrawn |

== Support staff ==
In September 2024, it was announced that Zaheer Khan would join Lucknow in a mentorship role.

| Position | Name |
|---|---|
| Head coach | Justin Langer |
| Assistant coach | Lance Klusener; Vijay Dahiya |
| Fielding coach | Jonty Rhodes |
| Mentor | Zaheer Khan |

- Source: Wisden

== League stage ==
Lucknow Super Giants began their season with a loss to Delhi Capitals. They won their next match against Sunrisers Hyderabad but lost to Punjab Kings. Lucknow won their next three matches against Mumbai Indians, Kolkata Knight Riders and Gujarat Titans; lost to Chennai Super Kings and won against Rajasthan Royals. They lost their next four matches against Delhi, Mumbai, Punjab and Hyderabad; and were eliminated from the 2025 IPL. They won their next game against Gujarat but lost to Royal Challengers Bengaluru.

=== Points table ===
League stage standings
| Pos | Grp | Team | Pld | W | L | NR | Pts | NRR | Qualification |
|---|---|---|---|---|---|---|---|---|---|
| 1 | A | Punjab Kings | 14 | 9 | 4 | 1 | 19 | 0.372 | Advance to Qualifier 1 |
| 2 | A | Royal Challengers Bengaluru | 14 | 9 | 4 | 1 | 19 | 0.301 | Advance to Qualifier 1 |
| 3 | B | Gujarat Titans | 14 | 9 | 5 | 0 | 18 | 0.254 | Advance to Eliminator |
| 4 | B | Mumbai Indians | 14 | 8 | 6 | 0 | 16 | 1.142 | Advance to Eliminator |
| 5 | B | Delhi Capitals | 14 | 7 | 6 | 1 | 15 | −0.011 | Eliminated |
| 6 | B | Sunrisers Hyderabad | 14 | 6 | 7 | 1 | 13 | −0.241 | Eliminated |
| 7 | B | Lucknow Super Giants | 14 | 6 | 8 | 0 | 12 | −0.376 | Eliminated |
| 8 | A | Kolkata Knight Riders | 14 | 5 | 7 | 2 | 12 | −0.305 | Eliminated |
| 9 | A | Rajasthan Royals | 14 | 4 | 10 | 0 | 8 | −0.549 | Eliminated |
| 10 | A | Chennai Super Kings | 14 | 4 | 10 | 0 | 8 | −0.647 | Eliminated |

Source: ESPNcricinfo

=== League progression ===
League progression
| Team | Group matches | | | | | | | | | | | | | | Playoffs | | |
| Team | 1 | 2 | 3 | 4 | 5 | 6 | 7 | 8 | 9 | 10 | 11 | 12 | 13 | 14 | Q1/E | Q2 | F |
|---|---|---|---|---|---|---|---|---|---|---|---|---|---|---|---|---|---|
| Lucknow Super Giants | 0 | 2 | 2 | 4 | 6 | 8 | 8 | 10 | 10 | 10 | 10 | 10 | 12 | 12 | | | |

| Win | Loss | No result |

- Note: The total points at the end of each group match are listed.
- Note: Click on the points (group matches) or W/L (playoffs) to see the match summary.

=== Fixtures ===
Match 4
24 March 2025
19:30 (N)
Scorecard

| Lucknow Super Giants; 209/8 (20 overs) | v | Delhi Capitals (H); 211/9 (19.3 overs) |
| Nicholas Pooran 75 (30); Mitchell Starc 3/42 (4 overs) | | Ashutosh Sharma 66* (31); Shardul Thakur 2/19 (2 overs) |

Delhi Capitals won by 1 wicket
ACA–VDCA Cricket Stadium, Visakhapatnam
Umpires: Abhijit Bhattacharya (Ind) and Ulhas Gandhe (Ind)
Player of the match: Ashutosh Sharma (Delhi Capitals)

- Delhi Capitals won the toss and elected to field.
- Vipraj Nigam (Delhi Capitals), Prince Yadav and Digvesh Rathi (Lucknow Super Giants) made their IPL debuts.

Match 7
27 March 2025
19:30 (N)
Scorecard

| Sunrisers Hyderabad (H); 190/9 (20 overs) | v | Lucknow Super Giants; 193/5 (16.1 overs) |
| Travis Head 47 (28); Shardul Thakur 4/34 (4 overs) | | Nicholas Pooran 70 (26); Pat Cummins 2/29 (3 overs) |

Lucknow Super Giants won by 5 wickets
Rajiv Gandhi International Cricket Stadium, Hyderabad
Umpires: Abhijit Bhattacharya (Ind) and Ulhas Gandhe (Ind)
Player of the match: Shardul Thakur (Lucknow Super Giants)

- Lucknow Super Giants won the toss and elected to field.

Match 13
1 April 2025
19:30 (N)
Scorecard

| Lucknow Super Giants (H); 171/7 (20 overs) | v | Punjab Kings; 177/2 (16.2 overs) |
| Nicholas Pooran 44 (30); Arshdeep Singh 3/43 (4 overs) | | Prabhsimran Singh 69 (34); Digvesh Rathi 2/30 (4 overs) |

Punjab Kings won by 8 wickets
Ekana Cricket Stadium, Lucknow
Umpires: Abhijeet Bengeri (Ind) and Vinod Seshan (Ind)
Player of the match: Prabhsimran Singh (Punjab Kings)

- Punjab Kings won the toss and elected to field.

Match 16
4 April 2025
19:30 (N)
Scorecard

| Lucknow Super Giants (H); 203/8 (20 overs) | v | Mumbai Indians; 191/5 (20 overs) |
| Mitchell Marsh 60 (31); Hardik Pandya 5/36 (4 overs) | | Suryakumar Yadav 67 (43); Digvesh Rathi 1/21 (4 overs) |

Lucknow Super Giants won by 12 runs
Ekana Cricket Stadium, Lucknow
Umpires: Nitin Menon (Ind) and Saidharshan Kumar (Ind)
Player of the match: Digvesh Rathi (Lucknow Super Giants)

- Mumbai Indians won the toss and elected to field.

Match 21
8 April 2025
15:30 (D/N)
Scorecard

| Lucknow Super Giants; 238/3 (20 overs) | v | Kolkata Knight Riders (H); 234/7 (20 overs) |
| Nicholas Pooran 87* (36); Harshit Rana 2/51 (4 overs) | | Ajinkya Rahane 61 (35); Shardul Thakur 2/52 (4 overs) |

Lucknow Super Giants won by 4 runs
Eden Gardens, Kolkata
Umpires: Adrian Holdstock (SA) and Akshay Totre (Ind)
Player of the match: Nicholas Pooran (Lucknow Super Giants)

- Kolkata Knight Riders won the toss and elected to field.
- This match was originally scheduled for 6 April but was rescheduled to 8 April.

Match 26
12 April 2025
15:30 (N)
Scorecard

| Gujarat Titans; 180/6 (20 overs) | v | Lucknow Super Giants (H); 186/4 (19.3 overs) |
| Shubman Gill 60 (38); Shardul Thakur 2/34 (4 overs) | | Nicholas Pooran 61 (34); Prasidh Krishna 2/26 (4 overs) |

Lucknow Super Giants won by 6 wickets
Ekana Cricket Stadium, Lucknow
Umpires: Ulhas Gandhe (Ind) and Kannur Swaroopanand (Ind)
Player of the match: Aiden Markram (Lucknow Super Giants)

- Lucknow Super Giants won the toss and elected to field.

Match 30
14 April 2025
19:30 (N)
Scorecard

| Lucknow Super Giants (H); 166/7 (20 overs) | v | Chennai Super Kings; 168/5 (19.3 overs) |
| Rishabh Pant 63 (49); Ravindra Jadeja 2/24 (3 overs) | | Shivam Dube 43* (37); Ravi Bishnoi 2/18 (3 overs) |

Chennai Super Kings won by 5 wickets
Ekana Cricket Stadium, Lucknow
Umpires: Ulhas Gandhe (Ind) and Virender Sharma (Ind)
Player of the match: MS Dhoni (Chennai Super Kings)

- Chennai Super Kings won the toss and elected to field.
- Shaik Rasheed (Chennai Super Kings) made his IPL debut.

Match 36
19 April 2025
19:30 (N)
Scorecard

| Lucknow Super Giants; 180/5 (20 overs) | v | Rajasthan Royals (H); 178/5 (20 overs) |
| Aiden Markram 66 (45); Wanindu Hasaranga 2/31 (4 overs) | | Yashasvi Jaiswal 74 (52); Avesh Khan 3/37 (4 overs) |

Lucknow Super Giants won by 2 runs
Sawai Mansingh Stadium, Jaipur
Umpires: Jayaraman Madanagopal (Ind) and Vinod Seshan (Ind)
Player of the match: Avesh Khan (Lucknow Super Giants)

- Lucknow Super Giants won the toss and elected to bat.
- Vaibhav Sooryavanshi (Rajasthan Royals) became the youngest player to make IPL debut.

Match 40
22 April 2025
19:30 (N)
Scorecard

| Lucknow Super Giants (H); 159/6 (20 overs) | v | Delhi Capitals; 161/2 (17.5 overs) |
| Aiden Markram 52 (33); Mukesh Kumar 4/33 (4 overs) | | KL Rahul 57* (42); Aiden Markram 2/30 (3 overs) |

Delhi Capitals won by 8 wickets
Ekana Cricket Stadium, Lucknow
Umpires: Kaushik Gandhi (Ind) and Saidharshan Kumar (Ind)
Player of the match: Mukesh Kumar (Delhi Capitals)

- Delhi Capitals won the toss and elected to field.

Match 45
27 April 2025
15:30 (D/N)
Scorecard

| Mumbai Indians (H); 215/7 (20 overs) | v | Lucknow Super Giants; 161 (20 overs) |
| Ryan Rickelton 58 (32); Mayank Yadav 2/40 (4 overs) | | Ayush Badoni 35 (22); Jasprit Bumrah 4/22 (4 overs) |

Mumbai Indians won by 54 runs
Wankhede Stadium, Mumbai
Umpires: Chris Gaffaney (NZ) and Jayaraman Madanagopal (Ind)
Player of the match: Will Jacks (Mumbai Indians)

- Lucknow Super Giants won the toss and elected to field.
- Corbin Bosch (Mumbai Indians) made his IPL debut.

Match 54
4 May 2025
19:30 (N)
Scorecard

| Punjab Kings (H); 236/5 (20 overs) | v | Lucknow Super Giants; 199/7 (20 overs) |
| Prabhsimran Singh 91 (48); Akash Singh 2/30 (4 overs) | | Ayush Badoni 74 (40); Arshdeep Singh 3/16 (4 overs) |

Punjab Kings won by 37 runs
HPCA Cricket Stadium, Dharamshala
Umpires: Parashar Joshi (Ind) and Jayaraman Madanagopal (Ind)
Player of the match: Prabhsimran Singh (Punjab Kings)

- Lucknow Super Giants won the toss and elected to field.

Match 61
19 May 2025
19:30 (N)
Scorecard

| Lucknow Super Giants (H); 205/7 (20 overs) | v | Sunrisers Hyderabad; 206/4 (18.2 overs) |
| Mitchell Marsh 65 (39); Eshan Malinga 2/28 (4 overs) | | Abhishek Sharma 59 (20); Digvesh Rathi 2/37 (4 overs) |

Sunrisers Hyderabad won by 6 wickets
Ekana Cricket Stadium, Lucknow
Umpires: Michael Gough (Eng) and Kannur Swaroopanand (Ind)
Player of the match: Abhishek Sharma (Sunrisers Hyderabad)

- Sunrisers Hyderabad won the toss and elected to field.
- This match was originally scheduled for 18 May at the same venue, before being rescheduled.
- Harsh Dubey (Sunrisers Hyderabad) made his IPL debut.
- Lucknow Super Giants were eliminated as a result of this match.

Match 64
22 May 2025
19:30 (N)
Scorecard

| Lucknow Super Giants; 235/2 (20 overs) | v | Gujarat Titans (H); 202/9 (20 overs) |
| Mitchell Marsh 117 (64); Sai Kishore 1/34 (3 overs) | | Shahrukh Khan 57 (29); Will O'Rourke 3/27 (4 overs) |

Lucknow Super Giants won by 33 runs
Narendra Modi Stadium, Ahmedabad
Umpires: K. N. Ananthapadmanabhan (Ind) and Mohit Krishnadas (Ind)
Player of the match: Mitchell Marsh (Lucknow Super Giants)

- Gujarat Titans won the toss and elected to field.
- This match was originally scheduled for 14 May at the same venue, before being rescheduled.

Match 70
27 May 2025
19:30 (N)
Scorecard

| Lucknow Super Giants (H); 227/3 (20 overs) | v | Royal Challengers Bengaluru; 230/4 (18.4 overs) |
| Rishabh Pant 118* (61); Nuwan Thushara 1/26 (4 overs) | | Jitesh Sharma 85* (33); Will O'Rourke 2/74 (4 overs) |

Royal Challengers Bengaluru won by 6 wickets
Ekana Cricket Stadium, Lucknow
Umpires: Michael Gough (Eng) and Virender Sharma (Ind)
Player of the match: Jitesh Sharma (Royal Challengers Bengaluru)

- Royal Challengers Bengaluru won the toss and elected to field.
- This match was originally scheduled for 9 May at the same venue, before being rescheduled.

== Statistics ==
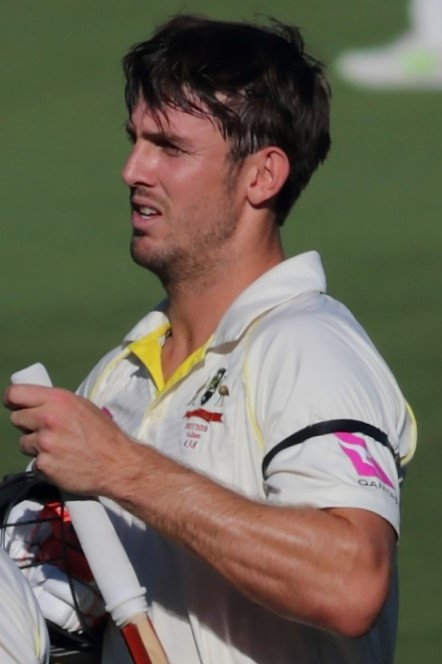
Mitchell Marsh scored the most runs (627) for Lucknow Super Giants in the 2025 Indian Premier League.

At the IPL end of season awards, Nicholas Pooran was awarded for scoring most sixes in the season.

Most runs
| Runs | Player |
|---|---|
| 627 | Mitchell Marsh |
| 524 | Nicholas Pooran |
| 445 | Aiden Markram |
| 329 | Ayush Badoni |
| 269 | Rishabh Pant |

Most wickets
| Wickets | Player |
|---|---|
| 14 | Digvesh Rathi |
| 13 | Avesh Khan |
| 13 | Shardul Thakur |
| 9 | Ravi Bishnoi |
| 6 | Will O'Rourke |
