= 2022 Lucknow Super Giants season =

Overview of Lucknow Super Giants in 2022

Lucknow Super Giants
2022 season
- Coach: Andy Flower
- Captain: KL Rahul
- Ground(s): BRSABV Ekana Cricket Stadium, Lucknow
- 2022 Indian Premier League: 4th
- Most runs: KL Rahul (616)
- Most wickets: Avesh Khan (18)

Lucknow Super Giants is a franchise cricket team based in Lucknow, Uttar Pradesh. They play in the Indian Premier League (IPL); the team's debut season was the 2022 edition of the IPL.

The team is owned by RPSG Group and was captained by KL Rahul and coached by Andy Flower in 2022.

== Background ==
As an expansion team, the franchise were able to add three players ahead of the 2022 mega-auction. The three players drafted were KL Rahul for ₹17 crore, Marcus Stoinis for ₹9.2 crore and leg-spinner Ravi Bishnoi for ₹4 crore. After these acquisitions the franchise was left with ₹59.8 crores ahead of the auction.

The team signed an additional 18 players at the auction. The most expensive addition to the squad was pace bowler Avesh Khan who became the most expensive uncapped player when Lucknow selected him for ₹10 crores.

Added
Marcus Stoinis, KL Rahul, Ravi Bishnoi
Acquired during the auction
Deepak Hooda, Jason Holder, Manish Pandey, Quinton de Kock, Krunal Pandya, Mark Wood, Avesh Khan, Ankit Singh Rajpoot, Krishnappa Gowtham, Dushmanta Chameera, Shahbaz Nadeem, Manan Vohra, Mohsin Khan, Ayush Badoni, Kyle Mayers, Karan Sharma, Evin Lewis, Mayank Yadav.:

Stadium

The play their home matches at the BRSABV Ekana Cricket Stadium in Lucknow, Uttar Pradesh. The stadium has a capacity of 50,100 and has hosted several international cricket matches, including T20Is, ODIs, and a Test match. It is set to host seven of the Lucknow Super Giants' home matches during the IPL 2024 season.

== Squad ==
- Players with international caps are listed in **bold**.

Squad strength: 21 (14 - Indian, 7 - overseas)

No.	Name	Nationality	Birth date	Batting style	Bowling style	Salary	Year signed	Notes
Captain
01	**KL Rahul**	India	18 April 1992 (aged 29)	Right-handed	Right-arm medium	₹17 crore (US$1.8 million)	2022	Captain
Batters
11	Ayush Badoni	India	3 December 1999 (aged 22)	Right-Handed	Right-Arm off-spin	₹20 lakh (US$21,000)	2022	
36	Manan Vohra	India	18 July 1993 (aged 28)	Right-handed	Right-arm medium	₹20 lakh (US$21,000)	2022	
21	**Manish Pandey**	India	10 September 1989 (aged 32)	Right-handed	Right-arm Medium	₹4.2 crore (US$440,000)	2022	
117	**Evin Lewis**	Trinidad and Tobago	27 December 1991 (aged 30)	Right-handed	Right-arm medium	₹2 crore (US$210,000)	2022	Overseas
All-rounders
7	**Krishnappa Gowtham**	India	20 October 1988 (aged 33)	Right Handed	Right-arm off-break		2022	
17	**Marcus Stoinis**	Australia	16 August 1989 (aged 32)	Right-handed	Right-arm medium	₹9.2 crore (US$960,000)	2022	Overseas
25	**Krunal Pandya**	India	24 March 1991 (aged 31)	Left-handed	Left Arm orthodox		2022	
46	Karan Sharma	India	31 October 1998 (aged 23)	Right Handed	Right-arm offbreak		2022	
57	**Deepak Hooda**	India	19 April 1995 (aged 26)	Right-handed	Right-arm off break		2022	
71	**Kyle Mayers**	Barbados	8 September 1992 (aged 29)	Left-Handed	Right-arm medium		2022	Overseas
98	**Jason Holder**	Barbados	5 November 1991 (aged 30)	Right-handed	Right-arm medium	₹8.75 crore (US$910,000)	2022	Overseas
Wicket-keepers
12	**Quinton de Kock**	South Africa	17 December 1992 (aged 29)	Left-handed	-	₹6.75 crore (US$0.8 million)	2022	Overseas
Spin bowlers
56	**Ravi Bishnoi**	India	5 September 2000 (aged 21)	Right-handed	Right-arm leg break		2022	
88	**Shahbaz Nadeem**	India	12 August 1989 (aged 32)	Right-handed	Left Arm orthodox		2022	
Pace Bowlers
05	**Dushmantha Chameera**	Sri Lanka	11 January 1992 (aged 30)	Right-handedb	Right-arm fast	₹2 crore (US$210,000)	2022	Overseas
08	Mayank Yadav	India	17 June 2002 (aged 19)	Right-handed	Right-arm fast-medium		2022	
39	Ankit Rajpoot	India	4 December 1993 (aged 28)	Right-handed	Right-arm medium-fast		2022	
47	Mohsin Khan	India	15 July 1998 (aged 23)	Left-handed	Left-arm medium-fast		2022	
65	**Avesh Khan**	India	13 December 1996 (aged 25)	Right-handed	Right-arm fast		2022	
68	**Andrew Tye**	Australia	12 December 1986 (aged 35)	Right-handed	Right-arm medium fast	NA	2022	Replacement for Mark Wood
	**Mark Wood**	England	11 January 1990 (aged 32)	Right-handed	Right-arm fast	₹7.5 crore (US$780,000)	2022	Overseas. Wood did not play during the season due to injury and was replaced by Andrew Tye

== Kit manufacturers and sponsors ==
Kit manufacturer	Shirt sponsor (chest)	Shirt sponsor (back)	Chest Branding
T10 Sports	My11Circle	Darwin Platform	Greenply
Source :

T20 uniform

== Points table ==
Pos	Grp	Team	Pld	W	L	NR	Pts	NRR	Qualification
1	B	Gujarat Titans (C)	14	10	4	0	20	0.316	Advanced to Qualifier 1
2	A	Rajasthan Royals (R)	14	9	5	0	18	0.298	Advanced to Qualifier 1
3	A	Lucknow Super Giants (4th)	14	9	5	0	18	0.251	Advanced to Eliminator
4	B	Royal Challengers Bangalore (3rd)	14	8	6	0	16	−0.253	Advanced to Eliminator
5	A	Delhi Capitals	14	7	7	0	14	0.204	
6	B	Punjab Kings	14	7	7	0	14	0.126	
7	A	Kolkata Knight Riders	14	6	8	0	12	0.146	
8	B	Sunrisers Hyderabad	14	6	8	0	12	−0.379	
9	B	Chennai Super Kings	14	4	10	0	8	−0.203	
10	A	Mumbai Indians	14	4	10	0	8	−0.506	

Source: IPLT20.com
(C) Champions; (R) Runners-up
The four top-ranked teams qualified for the playoffs.

== Group fixtures ==
Match 4
28 March 2022
19:30 (N)
Scorecard

Lucknow Super Giants; 158/6 (20 overs)	v	Gujarat Titans; 161/5 (19.4 overs)
Deepak Hooda 55 (41); Mohammed Shami 3/25 (4 overs)		Rahul Tewatia 40* (24); Dushmantha Chameera 2/22 (3 overs)

Gujarat Titans won by 5 wickets
Wankhede Stadium, Mumbai
Umpires: Pashchim Pathak (Ind) and Virender Sharma (Ind)
Player of the match: Mohammed Shami (Gujarat Titans)

- Gujarat Titans won the toss and elected to field.

Match 7
31 March 2022
19:30 (N)
Scorecard

Chennai Super Kings; 210/7 (20 overs)	v	Lucknow Super Giants; 211/4 (19.3 overs)
Robin Uthappa 50 (27); Ravi Bishnoi 2/24 (4 overs)		Quinton de Kock 65 (45); Dwaine Pretorius 2/31 (4 overs)

Lucknow Super Giants won by 6 wickets
Brabourne Stadium, Mumbai
Umpires: Virender Sharma (Ind) and Rod Tucker (Aus)
Player of the match: Evin Lewis (Lucknow Super Giants)

- Lucknow Super Giants won the toss and elected to field.

Match 12
4 April 2022
19:30 (N)
Scorecard

Lucknow Super Giants; 169/7 (20 overs)	v	Sunrisers Hyderabad; 157/9 (20 overs)
KL Rahul 68 (50); T. Natarajan 2/26 (4 overs)		Rahul Tripathi 44 (30); Avesh Khan 4/24 (4 overs)

Lucknow Super Giants won by 12 runs
DY Patil Stadium, Navi Mumbai
Umpires: Jayaraman Madanagopal (Ind) and Navdeep Singh (Ind)
Player of the match: Avesh Khan (Lucknow Super Giants)

- Sunrisers Hyderabad won the toss and elected to field.

Match 15
7 April 2022
19:30 (N)
Scorecard

Delhi Capitals; 149/3 (20 overs)	v	Lucknow Super Giants; 155/4 (19.4 overs)
Prithvi Shaw 61 (34); Ravi Bishnoi 2/22 (4 overs)		Quinton de Kock 80 (52); Kuldeep Yadav 2/31 (3.4 overs)

Lucknow Super Giants won by 6 wickets
DY Patil Stadium, Navi Mumbai
Umpires: Tapan Sharma (Ind) and Rod Tucker (Aus)
Player of the match: Quinton de Kock (Lukhnow Super Giants)

- Lucknow Super Giants won the toss and elected to field.

Match 20
10 April 2022
19:30 (N)
Scorecard

Rajasthan Royals; 165/6 (20 overs)	v	Lucknow Super Giants; 162/8 (20 overs)
Shimron Hetmyer 59* (36); Krishnappa Gowtham 2/30 (4 overs)		Quinton de Kock 39 (32); Yuzvendra Chahal 4/41 (4 overs)

Rajasthan Royals won by 3 runs
Wankhede Stadium, Mumbai
Umpires: Anil Chaudhary (Ind) and Tapan Sharma (Ind)
Player of the match: Yuzvendra Chahal (Rajasthan Royals)

- Lucknow Super Giants won the toss and elected to field.

Match 26
16 April 2022
15:30 (D/N)
Scorecard

Lucknow Super Giants; 199/4 (20 overs)	v	Mumbai Indians; 181/9 (20 overs)
KL Rahul 103* (60); Jaydev Unadkat 2/32 (4 overs)		Suryakumar Yadav 37 (27); Avesh Khan 3/30 (4 overs)

Lucknow Super Giants won by 18 runs
Brabourne Stadium, Mumbai
Umpires: Anil Chaudhary (Ind) and Nikhil Patwardhan (Ind)
Player of the match: KL Rahul (Lucknow Super Giants)

- Mumbai Indians won the toss and elected to field.

Match 31
19 April 2022
19:30 (N)
Scorecard

Royal Challengers Bangalore; 181/6 (20 overs)	v	Lucknow Super Giants; 163/8 (20 overs)
Faf du Plessis 96 (64); Jason Holder 2/25 (4 overs)		Krunal Pandya 42 (28); Josh Hazlewood 4/25 (4 overs)

Royal Challengers Bangalore won by 18 runs
DY Patil Stadium, Navi Mumbai
Umpires: Chris Gaffaney (NZ) and Nitin Pandit (Ind)
Player of the match: Faf du Plessis (Royal Challengers Bangalore)

- Lucknow Super Giants won the toss and elected to field.

Match 37
24 April 2022
19:30 (N)
Scorecard

Lucknow Super Giants; 168/6 (20 overs)	v	Mumbai Indians; 132/8 (20 overs)
KL Rahul 103* (62); Kieron Pollard 2/8 (2 overs)		Rohit Sharma 39 (31); Krunal Pandya 3/19 (4 overs)

Lucknow Super Giants won by 36 runs
Wankhede Stadium, Mumbai
Umpires: Marais Erasmus (SA) and Saiyed Khalid (Ind)
Player of the match: KL Rahul (Lucknow Super Giants)

- Mumbai Indians won the toss and elected to field.

Match 42
29 April 2022
19:30 (N)
Scorecard

Lucknow Super Giants; 153/8 (20 overs)	v	Punjab Kings; 133/8 (20 overs)
Quinton de Kock 46 (37); Kagiso Rabada 4/38 (4 overs)		Jonny Bairstow 32 (28); Mohsin Khan 3/24 (4 overs)

Lucknow Super Giants won by 20 runs
MCA International Stadium, Pune
Umpires: Ulhas Gandhe (Ind) and Michael Gough (Eng)
Player of the match: Krunal Pandya (Lucknow Super Giants)

- Punjab Kings won the toss and elected to field.

Match 45
1 May 2022
15:30 (D/N)
Scorecard

Lucknow Super Giants; 195/3 (20 overs)	v	Delhi Capitals; 189/7 (20 overs)
KL Rahul 77 (51); Shardul Thakur 3/40 (4 overs)		Rishabh Pant 44 (30); Mohsin Khan 4/16 (4 overs)

Lucknow Super Giants won by 6 runs
Wankhede Stadium, Mumbai
Umpires: Chris Gaffaney (NZ) and Chirra Ravikanthreddy (Ind)
Player of the match: Mohsin Khan (Lucknow Super Giants)

- Lucknow Super Giants won the toss and elected to bat.

Match 53
7 May 2022
19:30 (N)
Scorecard

Lucknow Super Giants; 176/7 (20 overs)	v	Kolkata Knight Riders; 101 (14.3 overs)
Quinton de Kock 50 (29); Andre Russell 2/22 (3 overs)		Andre Russell 45 (19); Avesh Khan 3/19 (3 overs)

Lucknow Super Giants won by 75 runs
MCA International Stadium, Pune
Umpires: Anil Chaudhary (Ind) and Michael Gough (Eng)
Player of the match: Avesh Khan (Lucknow Super Giants)

- Kolkata Knight Riders won the toss and elected to field.

Match 57
10 May 2022
19:30 (N)
Scorecard

Gujarat Titans; 144/4 (20 overs)	v	Lucknow Super Giants; 82 (13.5 overs)
Shubman Gill 63* (49); Avesh Khan 2/26 (4 overs)		Deepak Hooda 27 (26); Rashid Khan 4/24 (3.5 overs)

Gujarat Titans won by 62 runs
MCA International Stadium, Pune
Umpires: K. N. Ananthapadmanabhan (Ind) and Michael Gough (Eng)
Player of the match: Shubman Gill (Gujarat Titans)

- Gujarat Titans won the toss and elected to bat.
- Gujarat Titans qualified for the playoffs as a result of this match.

Match 63
15 May 2022
19:30 (N)
Scorecard

Rajasthan Royals; 178/6 (20 overs)	v	Lucknow Super Giants; 154/8 (20 overs)
Yashasvi Jaiswal 41 (29); Ravi Bishnoi 2/31 (4 overs)		Deepak Hooda 59 (39); Trent Boult 2/18 (4 overs)

Rajasthan Royals won by 24 runs
Brabourne Stadium, Mumbai
Umpires: Pashchim Pathak (Ind) and Tapan Sharma (Ind)
Player of the match: Trent Boult (Rajasthan Royals)

- Rajasthan Royals won the toss and elected to bat.

Match 66
18 May 2022
19:30 (N)
Scorecard

Lucknow Super Giants; 210/0 (20 overs)	v	Kolkata Knight Riders; 208/8 (20 overs)
Quinton de Kock 140* (70)		Shreyas Iyer 50 (29); Mohsin Khan 3/20 (4 overs)

Lucknow Super Giants won by 2 runs
DY Patil Stadium, Navi Mumbai
Umpires: Yeshwant Barde (Ind) and Rohan Pandit (Ind)
Player of the match: Quinton de Kock (Lucknow Super Giants)

- Lucknow Super Giants won the toss and elected to bat.
- Lucknow Super Giants qualified for the playoffs and Kolkata Knight Riders were eliminated as a result of this match.

== Playoffs ==
=== Preliminary ===
==== Eliminator ====
25 May 2022
19:30 (N)
Scorecard

Royal Challengers Bangalore; 207/4 (20 overs)	v	Lucknow Super Giants; 193/6 (20 overs)
Rajat Patidar 112* (54); Mohsin Khan 1/25 (4 overs)		KL Rahul 79 (58); Josh Hazlewood 3/43 (4 overs)

Royal Challengers Bangalore won by 14 runs
Eden Gardens, Kolkata
Umpires: Michael Gough (Eng) and Jayaraman Madanagopal (Ind)
Player of the match: Rajat Patidar (Royal Challengers Bangalore)

- Lucknow Super Giants won the toss and elected to field.
- Royal Challengers Bangalore advance to Qualifier 2 and Lucknow Super Giants were eliminated as a result of this match.

== Statistics ==
=== Most runs ===
No.	Name	Match	Inns	NO	Runs	HS	Ave.	BF	SR	100s	50s	0	4s	6s
1	KL Rahul	15	15	3	616	103*	51.33	455	135.38	2	4	3	45	30
2	Quinton de Kock	15	15	1	508	140*	36.28	341	148.97	1	3	0	47	23
3	Deepak Hooda	15	14	0	451	59	32.21	330	133.66	0	4	0	36	18
4	Krunal Pandya	14	13	4	183	42	20.33	145	126.20	0	0	1	16	4
5	Ayush Badoni	13	11	3	161	54	20.13	130	123.84	0	1	1	11	7
6	Marcus Stoinis	11	10	2	156	38*	19.50	106	147.16	0	0	1	7	13
7	Manish Pandey	6	6	0	88	38	14.67	80	110.00	0	0	0	9	2
8	Evin Lewis	6	5	2	73	55*	24.33	56	130.56	0	1	0	8	3
