= List of Indian Premier League five-wicket hauls =

In cricket, a five-wicket haul (also known as a "five-for" or "fifer") refers to a bowler taking five or more wickets in a single innings. This is regarded as a notable achievement, especially in T20 cricket where a bowler can bowl a maximum of only 24 balls (4 overs). The Indian Premier League (IPL) is a professional Twenty20 cricket league in India, which has been held annually since its first season in 2008. So far, 38 five-wicket hauls have been taken by different bowlers, of which only two five-wicket hauls have been taken outside India. Players from twelve of the thirteen teams have taken five-wicket hauls; Kochi Tuskers Kerala is the only franchise for which a player has not taken a five-wicket haul.

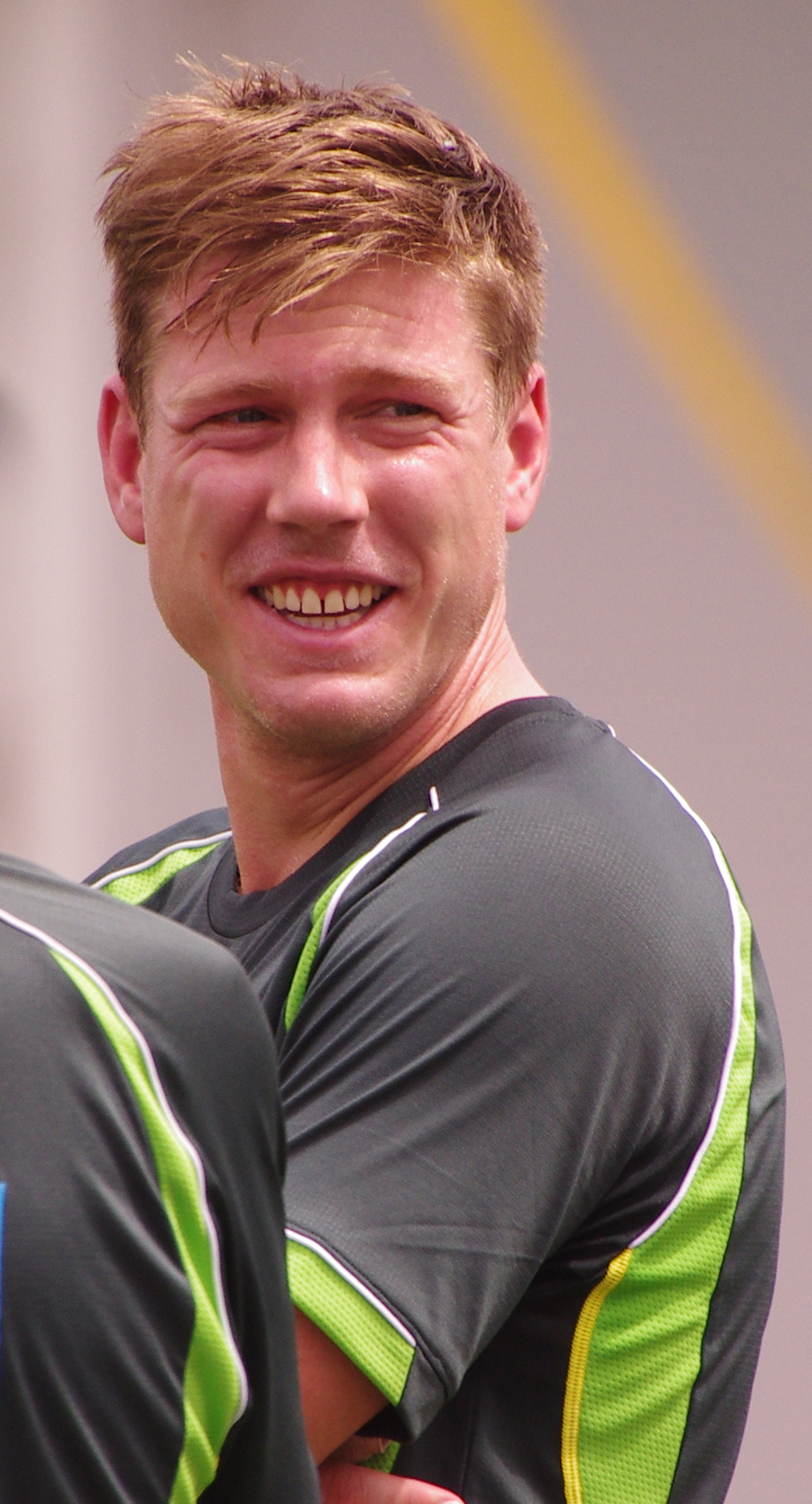
James Faulkner is one of the only four bowlers to take multiple five-wicket hauls and the only to take multiple five-wicket hauls in the same season.

The first five-wicket haul was taken by Sohail Tanvir of the Rajasthan Royals against the Chennai Super Kings on 4 May 2008. He finished the game with 6 wickets. The most economical five-wicket haul was taken by Akash Madhwal of the Mumbai Indians, who claimed five wickets with an economy rate of 1.43 in the 2023 season. Yuzvendra Chahal of the Rajasthan Royals took the least economical five-wicket haul, 5/40 bowling with an economy rate of 10.00 in 2021. Anil Kumble is the oldest bowler to take a five-wicket haul, achieving the feat at the age of 38, while Jaydev Unadkat is the youngest, he was 21 when he took his first five-for in 2013.

James Faulkner, Jaydev Unadkat, Bhuvneshwar Kumar, and Jasprit Bumrah are the only bowlers to take multiple five-wicket hauls in the IPL Eight five-wickets hauls have been taken by players of the Mumbai Indians, which is more than any other team. Sunrisers Hyderabad have had eight five-wicket hauls against them, the highest for any team. Five five-wicket hauls have been taken at the Rajiv Gandhi International Cricket Stadium, the most for a single venue. Lakshmipathy Balaji, Andrew Tye and Jaydev Unadkat are the only bowlers to take a hat-trick and a five-wicket haul in the same match, whereas Alzarri Joseph and Tye are the only bowlers to take a five-wicket haul on their IPL debut.

The best bowling figures in an IPL match was taken by Alzarri Joseph of Mumbai Indians who returned figures of 6/12 on his debut at the Rajiv Gandhi International Cricket Stadium, Hyderabad in 2019. Two other bowlers have taken a six-wicket haul in IPL – Sohail Tanvir of Rajasthan Royals in 2008 and Adam Zampa of Rising Pune Supergiant in 2016.

The first part of this list includes all the five-wicket hauls taken in the IPL in chronological order. The second part of the list provides an overview of five-wicket hauls by IPL seasons, and the third part provides an overview of five-wicket hauls by IPL teams. The list does not cover the games played by the IPL teams in other tournaments, such as the Champions League Twenty20, the British Asian Cup or the 2008 Kolkata Knight Riders tour of Australia.

== Key ==
Key
Symbol	Meaning
†	The bowler was man of the match
Date	Day on which the match was held
Inn	Innings in which the five-wicket haul was taken
Overs	Number of overs bowled
Runs	Number of runs conceded
Wkts	Number of wickets taken
Econ	Runs conceded per over
Batsmen	Batsmen whose wickets were taken
Result	Result for the bowler's team

== Five-wicket hauls ==
Indian Premier League five-wicket hauls (Note: To sort the table by any statistic, click on the icon in the column title.)
No.	Bowler	Date	Ground	Team	Opposing team	Inn	Overs	Runs	Wkts	Econ	Batsmen	Result
1	Sohail Tanvir †	4 May 2008	Sawai Mansingh Stadium, Jaipur	Rajasthan Royals	Chennai Super Kings	1	4	14	6	3.50	Parthiv Patel; Stephen Fleming; Vidyut Sivaramakrishnan; Albie Morkel; Muttiah Muralitharan; Makhaya Ntini	Won
2	Lakshmipathy Balaji †	10 May 2008	MA Chidambaram Stadium, Chennai	Chennai Super Kings	Kings XI Punjab	2	4	24	5	6.00	Shaun Marsh; Ramnaresh Sarwan; Irfan Pathan; Piyush Chawla; V. R. V. Singh	Won
3	Amit Mishra †	15 May 2008	Feroz Shah Kotla, Delhi	Delhi Daredevils	Deccan Chargers	2	4	17	5	4.25	Shahid Afridi; Herschelle Gibbs; Dwaraka Ravi Teja; R. P. Singh; Pragyan Ojha	Won
4	Anil Kumble	18 April 2009	Newlands Cricket Ground, Cape Town	Royal Challengers Bangalore	Rajasthan Royals	2	3.1	5	5	1.57	Yusuf Pathan; Ravindra Jadeja; Shane Warne; Munaf Patel; Kamran Khan	Won
5	Lasith Malinga †	10 April 2011	Feroz Shah Kotla, Delhi	Mumbai Indians	Delhi Daredevils	1	3.4	13	5	3.54	David Warner; Unmukt Chand; Venugopal Rao; Morné Morkel; Ashok Dinda	Won
6	Harbhajan Singh †	22 April 2011	Wankhede Stadium, Mumbai	Mumbai Indians	Chennai Super Kings	2	4	18	5	4.50	Suresh Raina; Anirudha Srikkanth; Albie Morkel; Ravichandran Ashwin; Joginder Sharma	Won
7	Ishant Sharma †	27 April 2011	Jawaharlal Nehru Stadium, Kochi	Deccan Chargers	Kochi Tuskers Kerala	2	3	12	5	4.00	Mahela Jayawardene; Parthiv Patel; Raiphi Gomez; Brad Hodge; Kedar Jadhav	Won
8	Munaf Patel	10 May 2011	Punjab Cricket Association Stadium, Mohali	Mumbai Indians	Kings XI Punjab	1	4	21	5	5.25	Paul Valthaty; Shaun Marsh; Dinesh Karthik; David Hussey; Ryan Harris	Lost
9	Ravindra Jadeja †	7 April 2012	ACA-VDCA Stadium, Visakhapatnam	Chennai Super Kings	Deccan Chargers	1	4	16	5	4.00	Parthiv Patel; Bharat Chipli; Daniel Christian; Manpreet Gony; Dale Steyn	Won
10	Dimitri Mascarenhas †	12 April 2012	Punjab Cricket Association Stadium, Mohali	Kings XI Punjab	Pune Warriors India	1	4	25	5	6.25	Sourav Ganguly; Marlon Samuels; Robin Uthappa; Mithun Manhas; Rahul Sharma	Won
11	Sunil Narine †	15 April 2012	Eden Gardens, Kolkata	Kolkata Knight Riders	Kings XI Punjab	1	4	19	5	4.75	Adam Gilchrist; Shaun Marsh; Bipul Sharma; Dimitri Mascarenhas; Praveen Kumar	Lost
12	James Faulkner † (1/2)	27 April 2013	Sawai Mansingh Stadium, Jaipur	Rajasthan Royals	Sunrisers Hyderabad	1	4	20	5	5.00	Shikhar Dhawan; Kumar Sangakkara; Karn Sharma; Darren Sammy; Amit Mishra	Won
13	Jaydev Unadkat † (1/2)	10 May 2013	Feroz Shah Kotla, Delhi	Royal Challengers Bangalore	Delhi Daredevils	2	4	25	5	6.25	Mahela Jayawardene; Virender Sehwag; Unmukt Chand; Kedar Jadhav; Morne Morkel	Won
14	James Faulkner (2/2)	17 May 2013	Rajiv Gandhi International Cricket Stadium, Hyderabad	Rajasthan Royals	Sunrisers Hyderabad	1	4	16	5	4.00	Parthiv Patel; Shikhar Dhawan; Biplab Samantray; Darren Sammy; Dale Steyn	Lost
15	Adam Zampa †	10 May 2016	ACA-VDCA Stadium, Visakhapatnam	Rising Pune Supergiants	Sunrisers Hyderabad	1	4	19	6	4.75	Yuvraj Singh; Kane Williamson; Moises Henriques; Deepak Hooda; Naman Ojha; Bhuvneshwar Kumar	Lost
16	Andrew Tye †	14 April 2017	Saurashtra Cricket Association Stadium, Rajkot	Gujarat Lions	Rising Pune Supergiants	1	4	17	5	4.25	Rahul Tripathi; Ben Stokes; Ankit Sharma; Manoj Tiwary; Shardul Thakur	Won
17	Bhuvneshwar Kumar† (1/2)	17 April 2017	Rajiv Gandhi International Cricket Stadium, Hyderabad	Sunrisers Hyderabad	Kings XI Punjab	2	4	19	5	4.75	Hashim Amla; Glenn Maxwell; Mohit Sharma; KC Cariappa; Manan Vohra	Won
18	Jaydev Unadkat (2/2)	6 May 2017	Rajiv Gandhi International Cricket Stadium, Hyderabad	Rising Pune Supergiant	Sunrisers Hyderabad	1	4	30	5	7.5	Yuvraj Singh; Bipul Sharma; Naman Ojha; Rashid Khan; Bhuvneshwar Kumar	Won
19	Ankit Rajpoot	26 April 2018	Rajiv Gandhi International Cricket Stadium, Hyderabad	Kings XI Punjab	Sunrisers Hyderabad	1	4	14	5	3.50	Kane Williamson; Shikhar Dhawan; Wriddhiman Saha; Manish Pandey; Mohammad Nabi	Lost
20	Alzarri Joseph †	6 April 2019	Rajiv Gandhi International Cricket Stadium, Hyderabad	Mumbai Indians	Sunrisers Hyderabad	2	3.4	12	6	3.27	David Warner; Vijay Shankar; Deepak Hooda; Rashid Khan; Bhuvneshwar Kumar; Siddarth Kaul	Won
21	Varun Chakravarthy †	24 October 2020	Sheikh Zayed Cricket Stadium, Abu Dhabi	Kolkata Knight Riders	Delhi Capitals	2	4	20	5	5.00	Rishabh Pant; Shimron Hetmyer; Shreyas Iyer; Marcus Stoinis; Axar Patel	Won
22	Harshal Patel †	9 April 2021	MA Chidambaram Stadium, Chennai	Royal Challengers Bangalore	Mumbai Indians	1	4	27	5	6.75	Hardik Pandya; Ishan Kishan; Krunal Pandya; Kieron Pollard; Marco Jansen	Won
23	Andre Russell	13 April 2021	M. A. Chidambaram Stadium, Chennai	Kolkata Knight Riders	Mumbai Indians	1	2	15	5	7.50	Kieron Pollard; Marco Jansen; Krunal Pandya; Jasprit Bumrah; Rahul Chahar	Lost
24	Arshdeep Singh	21 September 2021	Dubai International Cricket Stadium, Dubai	Punjab Kings	Rajasthan Royals	1	4	32	5	8.00	Evin Lewis; Liam Livingstone; Mahipal Lomror; Chetan Sakariya; Kartik Tyagi	Lost
25	Yuzvendra Chahal †	18 April 2022	Brabourne Stadium, Mumbai	Rajasthan Royals	Kolkata Knight Riders	2	4	40	5	10.00	Nitish Rana; Venkatesh Iyer; Shreyas Iyer; Shivam Mavi; Pat Cummins	Won
26	Umran Malik †	27 April 2022	Wankhede Stadium, Mumbai	Sunrisers Hyderabad	Gujarat Titans	2	4	25	5	6.25	Shubman Gill; Hardik Pandya; Wriddhiman Saha; David Miller; Abhinav Manohar	Lost
27	Wanindu Hasaranga †	8 May 2022	Wankhede Stadium, Mumbai	Royal Challengers Bangalore	Sunrisers Hyderabad	2	4	18	5	4.50	Aiden Markram; Nicholas Pooran; Jagadeesha Suchith; Shashank Singh; Umran Malik	Won
28	Jasprit Bumrah † (1/2)	9 May 2022	DY Patil Stadium, Mumbai	Mumbai Indians	Kolkata Knight Riders	1	4	10	5	2.50	Andre Russell; Nitish Rana; Sheldon Jackson; Pat Cummins; Sunil Narine	Lost
29	Mark Wood †	1 April 2023	Ekana Cricket Stadium, Lucknow	Lucknow Super Giants	Delhi Capitals	2	4	14	5	3.50	Prithvi Shaw; Mitchell Marsh; Sarfaraz Khan; Rilee Rossouw; Chetan Sakariya	Won
30	Bhuvneshwar Kumar † (2/2)	15 May 2023	Narendra Modi Stadium, Ahmedabad	Sunrisers Hyderabad	Gujarat Titans	1	4	30	5	7.50	Wriddhiman Saha; Shubman Gill; Hardik Pandya; Rashid Khan; Mohammed Shami	Lost
31	Akash Madhwal †	24 May 2023	M.A. Chidambaram Stadium, Chennai	Mumbai Indians	Lucknow Super Giants	2	3.3	5	5	1.43	Prerak Mankad; Ayush Badoni; Nicholas Pooran; Ravi Bishnoi; Mohsin Khan	Won
32	Mohit Sharma	26 May 2023	Narendra Modi Stadium, Ahmedabad	Gujarat Titans	Mumbai Indians	2	2.2	10	5	4.3	Suryakumar Yadav; Vishnu Vinod; Chris Jordan; Piyush Chawla; Kumar Kartikeya	Won
33	Yash Thakur†	7 April 2024	Ekana Cricket Stadium, Lucknow	Lucknow Super Giants	Gujarat Titans	2	3.5	30	5	7.8	Shubman Gill; Vijay Shankar; Rashid Khan; Rahul Tewatia; Noor Ahmad	Won
34	Jasprit Bumrah† (2/2)	11 April 2024	Wankhede Stadium, Mumbai	Mumbai Indians	Royal Challengers Bengaluru	1	4	21	5	5.20	Virat Kohli; Faf du Plessis; Mahipal Lomror; Saurav Chauhan; Vijaykumar Vyshak	Won
35	Sandeep Sharma†	22 April 2024	Sawai Mansingh Stadium, Jaipur	Rajasthan Royals	Mumbai Indians	1	4	18	5	4.50	Ishan Kishan; Suryakumar Yadav; Tilak Varma; Gerald Coetzee; Tim David	Won
36	Mitchell Starc†	30 March 2025	ACA–VDCA Cricket Stadium, Visakhapatnam	Delhi Capitals	Sunrisers Hyderabad	1	3.4	35	5	9.54	Ishan Kishan; Nitish Kumar Reddy; Travis Head; Harshal Patel; Wiaan Mulder	Won
37	Hardik Pandya	4 April 2025	Ekana Cricket Stadium, Lucknow	Mumbai Indians	Lucknow Super Giants	1	4	36	5	9	Nicholas Pooran; Rishabh Pant; Aiden Markram; David Miller; Akash Deep	Lost
38	Mohsin Khan	26 April 2026	Ekana Cricket Stadium, Lucknow	Lucknow Super Giants	Kolkata Knight Riders	1	4	23	5	5.75	Tim Seifert; Ajinkya Rahane; Rovman Powell; Cameron Green; Anukul Roy	Lost

== Season overview ==
2011, 2022, and 2023 had the most five-wicket hauls with 4. No five-wicket hauls were taken in 2010, 2014 and 2015.

Season wise statistics for five-wicket hauls
Year	No. of five-wicket hauls	Best Bowling figures	Bowler	Team
2008	3	6/14	Sohail Tanvir	Rajasthan Royals
2009	1	5/5	Anil Kumble	Royal Challengers Bangalore
2010	0	4/13	Doug Bollinger	Chennai Super Kings
2011	4	5/12	Ishant Sharma	Deccan Chargers
2012	3	5/16	Ravindra Jadeja	Chennai Super Kings
2013	3	5/16	James Faulkner	Rajasthan Royals
2014	0	4/12	Ravindra Jadeja	Chennai Super Kings
2015	0	4/10	Ashish Nehra	Chennai Super Kings
2016	1	6/19	Adam Zampa	Rising Pune Supergiants
2017	3	5/17	Andrew Tye	Gujarat Lions
2018	1	5/14	Ankit Rajpoot	Kings XI Punjab
2019	1	6/12	Alzarri Joseph	Mumbai Indians
2020	1	5/20	Varun Chakravarthy	Kolkata Knight Riders
2021	3	5/15	Andre Russell	Kolkata Knight Riders
2022	4	5/10	Jasprit Bumrah	Mumbai Indians
2023	4	5/5	Akash Madhwal	Mumbai Indians
2024	3	5/18	Sandeep Sharma	Rajasthan Royals
2025	2	5/35	Mitchell Starc	Delhi Capitals
2026	1	5/23	Mohsin Khan	Lucknow Super Giants

== Team overview ==
Team wise statistics for five-wicket hauls
Team	No. of five-wicket hauls	Best bowling figures	Bowler	Ref
Chennai Super Kings	2	5/16	Ravindra Jadeja	
Deccan Chargers†	1	5/12	Ishant Sharma	
Delhi Capitals	2	5/17	Amit Mishra	
Gujarat Lions†	1	5/17	Andrew Tye	
Gujarat Titans	1	5/10	Mohit Sharma	
Kochi Tuskers Kerala†	0	4/13	Brad Hodge	
Kolkata Knight Riders	3	5/15	Andre Russell	
Lucknow Super Giants	3	5/14	Mark Wood	
Mumbai Indians	8	6/12	Alzarri Joseph	
Pune Warriors India†	0	4/18	Ashoke Dinda	
Punjab Kings	3	5/14	Ankit Rajpoot	
Rajasthan Royals	5	6/14	Sohail Tanvir	
Rising Pune Supergiant†	2	6/19	Adam Zampa	
Royal Challengers Bengaluru	4	5/5	Anil Kumble	
Sunrisers Hyderabad	3	5/19	Bhuvneshwar Kumar	

Last updated: 31 May 2023

== See also ==
- List of Indian Premier League records and statistics
- Purple Cap
- List of Indian Premier League centuries
