= Lucknow Super Giants =

Lucknow-based cricket franchise in the Indian Premier League

- League: Indian Premier League

Personnel
- Captain: Aiden Markram
- Coach: Justin Langer
- Owner: RP-Sanjiv Goenka Group

Team information
- City: Lucknow, Uttar Pradesh, India
- Founded: 2022; 4 years ago
- Home ground: Ekana Cricket Stadium, Lucknow
- Capacity: 50,101
- Official website: lucknowsupergiants.in
T20I kit

RPSG Group's active departments
Mohun Bagan Super Giant	Durban's Super Giants	Manchester Super Giants

Lucknow Super Giants (LSG) is an Indian professional Twenty20 cricket team based in Lucknow, Uttar Pradesh, that competes in the Indian Premier League (IPL). The franchise is owned by RP-Sanjiv Goenka Group. Ekana Cricket Stadium is its home ground. As of 2026, the team is coached by Justin Langer.

Since the first appearance in 2022, the team has reached the playoffs in two seasons (2022, 2023) and finished at 7th in points table in 2024 and 2025. Currently, LSG are the only active team to have never reached an IPL final.

== History ==
=== Formation ===
The Governing Council of the Indian Premier League issued an invitation to tender for two new teams in August 2021. First Gujarat Titans and the other Lucknow Super Giants. A total of 22 companies declared an interest, but with a high base price for the new teams, there were no more than six serious bidders. The Sanjiv Goenka-owned RP-Sanjiv Goenka Group won the rights to operate the Lucknow franchise with a bid of ₹7,090 crore (equivalent to ₹87 billion or US$930 million in 2026).

The team launched a competition to decide its name, with Lucknow Super Giants chosen in January 2022. South African franchise Durban's Super Giants and also in the renaming of Mohun Bagan Athletic Club's footballing division to Mohun Bagan Super Giant.

=== Season overview ===
At the February 2022 mega auction, the franchise purchased its first set of players. Notable players signed included KL Rahul, Quinton de Kock, Mark Wood and Marcus Stoinis. Later in the year, the franchise named Rahul as the captain of the team and former Zimbabwean cricketer Andy Flower as head coach. Additionally, former Indian cricketer Gautam Gambhir was appointed as the team mentor.

In the 2022 season, the franchise finished third in the group stage and qualified for the playoffs. They faced the fourth placed Royal Challengers Bangalore in the Eliminator match and were knocked out at that stage. The 2023 season saw the team again finishing 3rd and losing the eliminator, this time to Mumbai Indians.

The Lucknow Super Giants became one of the 10 most popular cricket clubs from India. As of April 2025, the club had 5.1 million followers on social media.

In 2024, the franchise finished 7th in the league stage winning 7 out of their 14 matches.

Ahead of mega auction, Lucknow Super Giants retained Nicholas Pooran, Ayush Badoni, Mohsin Khan, Ravi Bishnoi and Mayank Yadav. Notable releases included their former captain KL Rahul, Krunal Pandya, Marcus Stoinis, Quinton de Kock and others. They bought the most expensive player, their new captain, Rishabh Pant for ₹27 crores in the auction. Zaheer Khan was appointed as the mentor.

On February 24, 2026, the Lucknow Super Giants officially presented a new logo for the franchise ahead of the 2026 IPL season. The redesigned emblem contains three powerful symbols in one logo featuring the demigod Garuda, a crown, and an elephant, symbolizing courage, honor, and strength to mark a new and bigger era for the franchise.

== Home ground ==
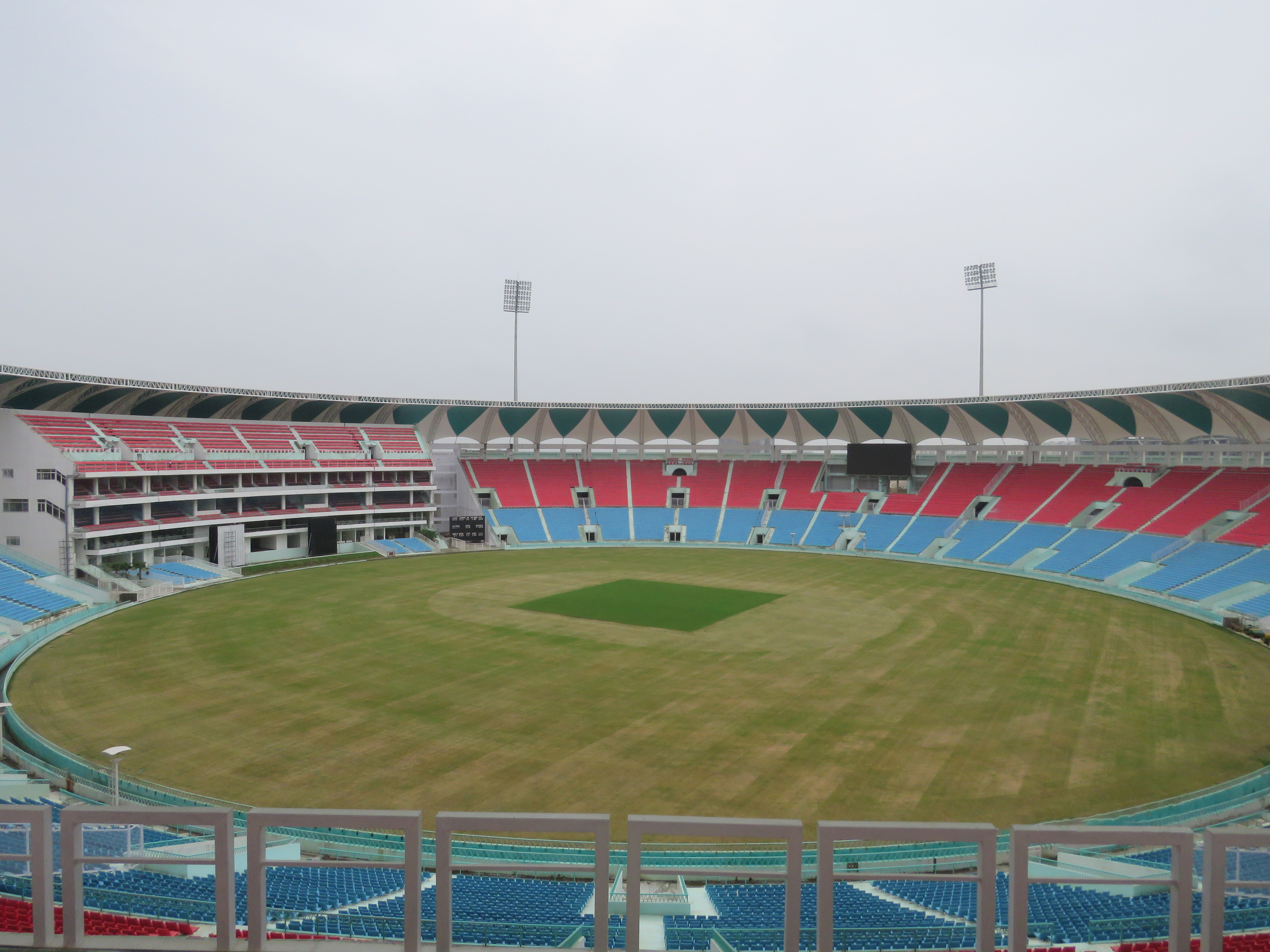
Ekana Cricket Stadium in Lucknow, India

The team's home ground is the Ekana Cricket Stadium in Lucknow. During its first season, the team was unable to play any matches at the ground due to restrictions put in place to limit the spread of COVID-19 in India; all of the 2022 league stage matches were hosted in Maharashtra. These restrictions were removed in 2023 and the team played on the ground during the season.

== Current squad ==
- Players with international caps are listed in **bold**.
- * denotes a player who is currently unavailable for selection.
- * denotes a player who is unavailable for rest of the season.

No.	Name	Nat	Birth date	Batting style	Bowling style	Year signed	Salary	Notes
Batters
94	**Aiden Markram**	(South Africa)	4 October 1994 (age 32)	Right-handed	Right-arm off break	2025	₹2 crore (US$210,000)	Captain Overseas
8	**Mitchell Marsh**	(Australia)	20 October 1991 (age 35)	Right-handed	Right-arm medium	2025	₹3.4 crore (US$360,000)	Overseas
1	Abdul Samad	(India)	28 October 2001 (age 25)	Right-handed	Right-arm leg break	2025	₹4.2 crore (US$450,000)	
45	Akshat Raghuwanshi	(India)	15 September 2003 (age 23)	Right-handed	Right-arm off break	2026	₹2.2 crore (US$240,000)	
Wicket-keepers
95	**Josh Inglis**	(Australia)	4 March 1995 (age 31)	Right-handed	—N/a	2026	₹8.6 crore (US$920,000)	Overseas
29	**Nicholas Pooran**	(Cricket West Indies)	2 October 1995 (age 31)	Left-handed	—N/a	2023	₹21 crore (US$2.2 million)	Vice-Captain; Overseas
25	Mukul Choudhary	(India)	6 August 2004 (age 22)	Right-handed	—N/a	2026	₹2.6 crore (US$280,000)	
All-rounders
58	**Sam Curran**	(England)	3 June 1998 (age 28)	Left-handed	Left-arm medium-fast	2027	₹2.4 crore (US$260,000)	Overseas
21	**Shahbaz Ahmed**	(India)	11 December 1994 (age 31)	Left-handed	Left-arm orthodox	2025	₹2.4 crore (US$260,000)	
3	Ayush Badoni	(India)	3 December 1999 (age 26)	Right-handed	Right-arm off break	2022	₹4 crore (US$430,000)	
33	Arshin Kulkarni	(India)	15 February 2005 (age 21)	Right-handed	Right-arm medium	2024	₹30 lakh (US$32,000)	
Pace bowlers
23	Mohsin Khan	(India)	15 July 1998 (age 28)	Left-handed	Left-arm medium-fast	2022	₹4 crore (US$430,000)	
25	**Prince Yadav**	(India)	12 December 2001 (age 24)	Right-handed	Right-arm fast	2025	₹30 lakh (US$32,000)	
24	Arjun Tendulkar	(India)	27 September 1999 (age 27)	Left-handed	Left-arm medium-fast	2026	₹30 lakh (US$32,000)	
72	Akash Singh	(India)	26 April 2002 (age 24)	Right-handed	Left-arm medium-fast	2025	₹30 lakh (US$32,000)	
44	**Mayank Yadav**	(India)	17 June 2002 (age 24)	Right-handed	Right-arm fast	2022	₹11 crore (US$1.2 million)	
Spin bowlers
74	Digvesh Rathi	(India)	15 December 1999 (age 26)	Right-handed	Right-arm leg break	2025	₹30 lakh (US$32,000)	
23	**Kuldeep Yadav**	(India)	14 December 1994 (age 31)	Left-handed	Left-arm wrist-spin	2027	₹13.5 crore (US$1.4 million)	
Source: LSG Squad

== Administration and support staff ==
Position	Name
Director Of Cricket	(Australia) Tom Moody
Head coach	(Australia) Justin Langer
Strategic Advisor	(New Zealand) Kane Williamson
Assistant Coach	(South Africa) Lance Klusener
Batting Coach	(India) Jayakumar Govindamenon
Spin Bowling Coach	(England) Carl Crowe
Fast Bowling Coach	(India) Bharat Arun
Fielding & Wicket Keeping Coach	(India) Abhay Sharma
Assistant Fielding Coach	(South Africa) Ryan Cook
Source: LSG Staff

== Seasons ==
Season	League standing	Final standing
2022	3rd out of 10	Playoffs
2023	3rd out of 10	Playoffs
2024	7th out of 10	League stage
2025	7th out of 10	League stage
2026	10th out of 10	League stage

=== Captains ===
Last updated: 11 April 2026

Player	Nationality (Note: The information in the nationality column is according to Cricinfo. This information may not necessarily reflect the player's birthplace or citizenship.)	From	To	Matches	Won	Lost	Tied	NR	Win%	Best Result
KL Rahul	India	2022	2024	37	20	17	0	0	54.05	Playoffs (2022, 2023)
Krunal Pandya	India	2023	2023	6	3	2	0	1	50	Stand-In
Nicholas Pooran	West Indies	2024	2024	1	1	0	0	0	100	Stand-In
Rishabh Pant	India	2025	2026	17	8	9	0	0	47.05	-

== Statistics ==
Season	Most runs	Most wickets
2022	KL Rahul (616)	Avesh Khan (18)
2023	Marcus Stoinis (408)	Ravi Bishnoi (16)
2024	KL Rahul (520)	Naveen-ul-Haq (14)
2025	Mitchell Marsh (627)	Shardul Thakur (13)

=== Season summary ===
Season	Round	Table Standing	Matches Played	Won	Lost	NR	Win%
2022	Playoffs	3rd	15	9	6	0	60.00
2023	Playoffs	3rd	15	8	6	1	53.33
2024	League	7th	14	7	7	0	50.00
2025	League	7th	14	6	8	0	42.86
Total			58	30	27	1	51.72

Source- Cricbuzz

=== Performance in IPL Knockouts ===
Played	Won	Lost	Win%
2	0	2	00.00

=== Head to Head Record ===
Opponent Team	Matches Played	Matches Won	Matches Lost	No Result	Success Rate (in %)
Chennai Super Kings	7	3	3	1	50.00
Delhi Capitals	7	3	4	0	42.90
Gujarat Titans	7	3	4	0	42.86
Kolkata Knight Riders	6	4	2	0	66.67
Mumbai Indians	8	6	2	0	75.00
Punjab Kings	6	3	3	0	50.00
Rajasthan Royals	6	2	4	0	33.33
Royal Challengers Bengaluru	8	3	5	0	37.5
Sunrisers Hyderabad	6	4	2	0	66.66

Last updated: 31 Dec 2025

== Sponsors ==
=== Kit suppliers and shirt sponsors ===
Period	Kit supplier	Shirt sponsor (front)	Shirt sponsor (back)
2022–2023	T10 Sports	My11Circle	Darwin Platform
2023–2024	Alcis	My11Circle	Shyam Steel
2024–2025	SIX5SIX	My11Circle	BKT
2025–2026	UYP	Dream11	BKT
2026–present	UYP	JK Super Cement	BKT

== See also ==
- Durban's Super Giants
- Mohun Bagan Super Giant
- Manchester Super Giants
