= Yudhvir Singh (cricketer) =

Indian cricketer (born 1997)

Personal information
- Full name: Yudhvir Singh Charak
- Born: 13 September 1997 (age 29); Jammu, Jammu and Kashmir, India
- Batting: Right-handed
- Bowling: Right-arm medium-fast
- Role: Bowler

Domestic team information
- Years: Team
- 2019/20–2020/21: Hyderabad
- 2021/22–present: Jammu and Kashmir
- 2023–2024: Lucknow Super Giants
- 2025: Rajasthan Royals

Career statistics
Competition	FC	LA	T20
Matches	11	15	33
Runs scored	215	161	198
Batting average	15.35	16.10	9.90
100s/50s	0/0	0/1	0/0
Top score	31*	64	29
Balls bowled	1,420	800	588
Wickets	29	18	25
Bowling average	28.00	50.77	33.04
5 wickets in innings	1	0	0
10 wickets in match	0	0	0
Best bowling	5/17	4/54	3/13
Catches/stumpings	2/–	5/–	15/–
- Source: Cricinfo, 28 March 2025

Yudhvir Singh Charak (born 13 September 1997) is an Indian cricketer. He currently plays for Jammu and Kashmir in domestic cricket and for Rajasthan Royals in the IPL. He made his Twenty20 debut on 12 November 2019, for Hyderabad in the 2019–20 Syed Mushtaq Ali Trophy. He made his first-class debut on 17 December 2019, for Hyderabad in the 2019–20 Ranji Trophy. In February 2021, Singh was bought by the Mumbai Indians in the IPL auction ahead of the 2021 Indian Premier League.

In December 2022, he was bought by the Lucknow Super Giants in the IPL auction ahead of the 2023 Indian Premier League. He made his debut for LSG on April 15, 2023, and bowled an economical spell taking 2 wickets. Ahead of IPL 2025, Rajasthan Royals secured the pacer for 35 lakhs.
