= Greenply =

Indian plywood manufacturer

Greenply Industries Limited (Greenply), is an Indian interior infrastructure company, headquartered in Kolkata, West Bengal. The company is listed on the National Stock Exchange (NSE) and the Bombay Stock Exchange. Greenply has a presence with 55 branches (including virtual branches) and 7,500+ channel partners across India. With state-of-the-art manufacturing facilities in West Bengal, Nagaland & Gujarat, and overseas manufacturing units in Gabon (West Africa) & Myanmar, Greenply is making its presence felt across the globe.

== History ==
On 28th of November, 1990, the company was incorporated as "Mittal Laminates Private Limited" by Mr. Rajesh Mittal. There was an amalgamation between Greenply Industries and Mittal Laminates Limited on April 1, 1994. Later in 1996, the organization was renamed as Greenply Industries Ltd and the flagship brand of Greenply was launched in 1997.

The brand Optima was launched in 2008 while 2011 witnessed the launch of brand Ecotec in the economy segment. 2001 observed the launch of Green Club - a premium-grade plywood that introduced 300% lifetime warranty (a first in the industry).

However, very recently in 2019-20, the premium portfolio segment of plywood consisting of Green Club Plus 700, Green Club 5 Hundred and Green Platinum was upgraded and improved (with new features & warranty terms) to meet the increasing requirement of safe & healthy homes. India’s first zero-emission (E-0) plywood, Green Club Plus 700, was launched in 2020.
