= Avesh Khan =

Indian cricketer (born 1996)

Personal information
- Born: 13 December 1996 (age 29); Indore, Madhya Pradesh, India
- Height: 6 ft 2 in (188 cm)
- Batting: Right-handed
- Bowling: Right-arm fast-medium
- Role: Bowler

International information
- National side: India (2022–present)
- ODI debut (cap 244): 24 July 2022 v West Indies
- Last ODI: 17 December 2023 v South Africa
- ODI shirt no.: 65
- T20I debut (cap 96): 20 February 2022 v West Indies
- Last T20I: 10 November 2024 v South Africa
- T20I shirt no.: 65

Domestic team information
- Years: Team
- 2017–present: Madhya Pradesh
- 2017: Royal Challengers Bangalore
- 2018–2021: Delhi Capitals
- 2022–2023, 2025–present: Lucknow Super Giants
- 2024: Rajasthan Royals

Career statistics
| Competition | ODI | T20I | FC | LA |
|---|---|---|---|---|
| Matches | 8 | 25 | 49 | 42 |
| Runs scored | 23 | 27 | 630 | 140 |
| Batting average | 7.66 | 13.50 | 14.65 | 9.33 |
| 100s/50s | 0/0 | 0/0 | 0/2 | 0/0 |
| Top score | 10 | 16 | 64 | 32* |
| Balls bowled | 356 | 499 | 7,993 | 1,899 |
| Wickets | 9 | 27 | 180 | 49 |
| Bowling average | 36.55 | 27.85 | 22.87 | 33.55 |
| 5 wickets in innings | 0 | 0 | 8 | 1 |
| 10 wickets in match | 0 | – | 2 | 0 |
| Best bowling | 4/27 | 4/18 | 7/24 | 6/37 |
| Catches/stumpings | 3/– | 11/– | 8/– | 12/– |
Medal record
Men's cricket
Representing India
Asian Games
| Gold medal – first place | 2022 Hangzhou |
ICC U19 Cricket World Cup
| Runner-up | 2016 Bangladesh |
ACC U19 Asia Cup
| Winner | 2013-14 UAE |
- Source: CricInfo, 6 March 2025

Avesh Khan (born 13 December 1996) is an Indian international cricketer. He made his international debut in February 2022 against West Indies and was part of India's squad for the 2016 U19 World Cup. A right-arm fast-medium bowler, he is known for bowling at speeds of around 145 km/h, with a recorded maximum of 149 km/h. He plays for Madhya Pradesh in domestic cricket and Lucknow Super Giants in the Indian Premier League.

== Domestic career ==
He made his Twenty20 debut for Royal Challengers Bangalore in the 2017 Indian Premier League on 14 May 2017. In January 2018, he was bought by the Delhi Daredevils in the 2018 IPL auction. He made his List A debut for Madhya Pradesh in the 2017–18 Vijay Hazare Trophy on 5 February 2018.

He was the leading wicket-taker for Madhya Pradesh in the 2018–19 Ranji Trophy, with 35 dismissals in seven matches. In October 2019, he was named in India C's squad for the 2019–20 Deodhar Trophy.

Avesh finished as Delhi Capitals' highest wicket-taker in IPL 2021 and the second highest wicket taker in the tournament with 24 wickets. In February 2022, he was bought by the Lucknow Super Giants in the auction for the 2022 Indian Premier League tournament. He was bought for ₹ 10Cr, making him the most expensive uncapped player in the history of the IPL. In November 2023, he was traded to Rajasthan Royals.

== International career ==
In January 2021, he was named as one of five net bowlers in India's Test squad for their series against England. In May 2021, he was also named as one of four standby players in India's Test squad for the final of the 2019–2021 ICC World Test Championship and their away series against England.

In November 2021, he was named in India's Twenty20 International (T20I) squad for their series against New Zealand. In January 2022, Khan was named in India's One Day International (ODI) and T20I squads for their home series against the West Indies. The following month, he was named in India's T20I squad for their series against Sri Lanka. He made his T20I debut on 20 February 2022, for India against the West Indies. Khan picked up his maiden T20I wicket in the final T20I against Sri Lanka, finishing with figures of 2/23 in his four overs.

In July 2022, he was named in India's ODI squad for their away series against the West Indies. He made his ODI debut for India on 24 July 2022, against the West Indies.

In May 2024, he was named as a reserve player in India's squad for the 2024 ICC Men's T20 World Cup tournament.
