= Mayank Yadav =

Indian cricketer (born 2002)

Personal information
- Full name: Mayank Prabhu Yadav
- Born: 17 June 2002 (age 24); Delhi, India
- Height: 6 ft 1 in (185 cm)
- Batting: Right-handed
- Bowling: Right-arm fast
- Role: Bowler

International information
- National side: India (2024–Present)
- T20I debut (cap 117): 6 October 2024 v Bangladesh
- Last T20I: 23 July 2026 v Zimbabwe
- T20I shirt no.: 44

Domestic team information
- Years: Team
- 2021–present: Delhi
- 2024–present: Lucknow Super Giants

Career statistics
Competition	T20I	FC	LA	T20
Matches	6	1	17	26
Runs scored	1	5	9	6
Batting average	–	5.00	1.50	6.00
100s/50s	0/0	0/0	0/0	0/0
Top score	1*	4	6	5
Balls bowled	138	104	822	529
Wickets	9	2	34	30
Bowling average	17.22	23.00	21.55	23.63
5 wickets in innings	0	0	0	0
10 wickets in match	0	0	0	0
Best bowling	3/29	2/46	4/47	3/14
Catches/stumpings	1/–	0/–	4/–	7/–
- Source: , 21 August 2026

Mayank Prabhu Yadav (born 17 June 2002) is an Indian International cricketer who plays for the Indian national cricket team in the T20I format. He is a right-arm fast bowler and a right-handed batsman. He represents Delhi in domestic cricket and Lucknow Super Giants in the Indian Premier League.

== Career ==
Yadav made his List A debut for Delhi against Haryana in the 2021–22 Vijay Hazare Trophy on 12 December 2021. He took 3 wickets in that match.

Although he had only played 2 List A, he was picked up by Lucknow Super Giants in the 2022 IPL Mega Auction for a price of ₹20 Lakhs. He did not get to play a single match in the season.

He went on to make his T20 debut for Delhi against Manipur in the 2022–23 Syed Mushtaq Ali Trophy on 11 October 2022. He took 2 wickets in the match with an economy rate of 5.75. He also made his first-class debut against Maharashtra in the 2022-23 Ranji Trophy on 13 December 2022.

He was ruled out of the 2023 IPL season. He finally got his chance in the 2024 IPL season and made his debut against Punjab Kings, where he picked up 3 wickets and conceded 27 runs. In this spell, he bowled the fastest ball in the 2024 IPL season, at a speed of 155.8 kmph. His overall performance in the match earned him the Player of the match award. In his very next match against Royal Challengers Bengaluru, he too 3 wickets while conceding 14 runs and broke his own record for the fastest ball set in the previous match with a speed of 156.7 kmph.

His exceptional performance in the season caught the selectors' eyes. He was selected for the three match T20I home series against Bangladesh. He made his international T20I debut against them on 6 October 2024, and after Ajit Agarkar and Arshdeep Singh, he became third Indian bowler to bowl his first over as maiden in T20I.

He was ruled out of the 2025 IPL season. He made IPL comeback in the 2026 season and his T20I comeback in the three match away series against Zimbabwe.
