= Nicholas Pooran =

Trinidadian cricketer (born 1995)

Personal information
- Born: 2 October 1995 (age 31); Couva, Trinidad and Tobago
- Height: 1.73 m (5 ft 8 in)
- Batting: Left-handed
- Bowling: Right-arm off break
- Role: Wicket-keeper-batter

International information
- National side: West Indies (2016–2024)
- ODI debut (cap 190): 20 February 2019 v England
- Last ODI: 7 July 2023 v Sri Lanka
- ODI shirt no.: 29
- T20I debut (cap 64): 23 September 2016 v Pakistan
- Last T20I: 19 December 2024 v Bangladesh
- T20I shirt no.: 29

Domestic team information
- Years: Team
- 2012/13–2023/24: Trinidad and Tobago (Note: Only teams that Pooran has played for in more than one season are included in this list.)
- 2013–2014: Trinidad and Tobago Red Steel
- 2016–2018: Barbados Tridents
- 2016–2017: Khulna Titans
- 2019–2021: Punjab Kings
- 2019–2021: Guyana Amazon Warriors
- 2022–present: Trinbago Knight Riders
- 2022/23–2023/24: Rangpur Riders
- 2023–present: Lucknow Super Giants
- 2023-present: MI Emirates
- 2023–present: MI New York
- 2024: Northern Superchargers
- 2025-present: MI Cape Town
- 2026: MI London

Career statistics
Competition	ODI	T20I	FC	T20
Matches	61	106	5	484
Runs scored	1,983	2,275	319	11,520
Batting average	39.66	26.14	31.9	30.15
100s/50s	3/11	0/13	0/2	5/71
Top score	118	98	69	108*
Balls bowled	169	–	6	–
Wickets	6	–	1	–
Bowling average	29.00	–	3.00	–
5 wickets in innings	0	–	0	–
10 wickets in match	0	–	0	–
Best bowling	4/48	–	1/3	–
Catches/stumpings	23/2	63/8	2/2	270/40
- Source: CricInfo, 7 September 2026

Nicholas Pooran ( /ˌpuːrɑːn/; born 2 October 1995) is a Trinidadian cricketer who represented the West Indies cricket team in limited overs formats until 2024 and served as the team's captain. He also competes domestically for Trinidad and Tobago and plays for the Lucknow Super Giants in the Indian Premier League (IPL). Pooran made his international debut for the West Indies in September 2016. In May 2022, he was appointed captain of the West Indies limited-overs team. He stepped down from captaincy in November 2022. In June 2025, he announced his retirement from international cricket.

== Domestic career ==
From Couva, Pooran attended Naparima College in San Fernando, and played for the school's cricket team. A left-handed wicket-keeper/batsman, he represented Trinidad and Tobago at various underage and schoolboys tournaments, and made his national under-19 debut at the 2012 regional tournament, aged only 16.

Pooran debuted for the West Indies under-19s in October 2013, in a bilateral series against the Bangladesh under-19s, and went on to play at the 2014 Under-19 World Cup. The team's vice-captain and primary wicket-keeper, he scored 303 runs from six matches, ranking fourth for total runs and leading the West Indies' averages.

This included half-centuries against Canada and India, and an innings of 143 runs against Australia (from a team total of 208 all out), which was the highest score of the tournament and was subsequently described as "one of the most memorable innings under pressure in the tournament's history". Pooran's innings was the highest ever under-19 ODI score against Australia, and his 136-run ninth-wicket partnership with Barbadian Jerome Jones was a record for all under-19 matches.

Before playing at international under-19 level, Pooran had played four matches for Trinidad and Tobago in the domestic one-day Regional Super50 competition, in February and March 2013.

Prior to the inaugural 2013 CPL season, he was selected in the Red Steel squad, Trinidad's CPL franchise, at age 17 was the youngest player in the competition. On debut against the Guyana Amazon Warriors, he scored 54 from 24 balls, an innings which included six sixes and was noted for its "clean, calm stroke play" and "uninhibited aggression". Pooran's batting was less successful for the remainder of the tournament, and also at the 2013 Champions League, where he represented the Trinidad and Tobago national team rather than the Red Steel franchise.

He again played for the Red Steel during the 2014 CPL season, but is yet to score any further half-centuries. Pooran made his first-class debut for Trinidad and Tobago against the Leeward Islands in November 2014, during the 2014–15 season of the Regional Four Day Competition.

In his second match, against Jamaica, he top-scored with 55 runs in T&T's second innings, before being one of Nikita Miller's seven victims. At club level, Pooran plays for Clarke Road in the Trinidadian leagues.

He also played part of the 2014 season in Ontario, representing the Redemption Sports Club in the Etobicoke & District Cricket League.

In January 2015, Pooran was involved in a road accident in St. Mary's, Trinidad, sustaining ankle and knee injuries. He was ruled out for both the remainder of Trinidad and Tobago's domestic season and the 2015 Caribbean Premier League.

In June 2018, he was named in the Cricket West Indies B Team for the inaugural edition of the Global T20 Canada tournament. In July 2020, he was named in the Guyana Amazon Warriors squad for the 2020 Caribbean Premier League (CPL). On 30 August 2020, in the CPL fixture against the St Kitts & Nevis Patriots, Pooran scored his first century in a T20 match.

Pooran was later appointed captain of the Trinidad and Tobago Red Force for the 2022–23 Super50 Cup. He steered the T&T Red Force to an eventual runners up spot against the Jamaica Scorpions in the final. Pooran was later named to the 2022 CG United Super50 Cup "Team of the Tournament."

== T20 franchise career ==
In February 2017, he was bought by the Mumbai Indians team for the 2017 Indian Premier League for INR 30 lakhs but didn't play any match in the whole season.

Pooran Played for Islamabad United in 2017 Pakistan Super League as he was drafted in as a replacement of England's Ben Duckett in United's squad. He joined the team ahead of play-offs. He made his debut against Karachi Kings.

Pooran went unsold in the 2018 IPL auction after setting his base price at INR 50 lakhs.

In October 2018, he was named in the Sylhet Sixers team, following the draft for the 2018–19 Bangladesh Premier League. He was the leading run-scorer for the team in the tournament, with 379 runs in eleven matches.

In December 2018, he was bought by the Kings XI Punjab in the player auction for the 2019 Indian Premier League for 4.2 crore ($590,000). Pooran had an excellent IPL 2020 season as he scored a total of 353 runs in the 14 matches he played in the season. He was also the fourth highest six hitter in the 2020 IPL season as he hit 25 sixes altogether in the season. He however scored only 85 runs in IPL 2021.

In the 2022 IPL Auction, Pooran was bought by the Sunrisers Hyderabad for ₹10.75 crore. For 2023, he was bought by the Lucknow Super Giants for ₹16 crore in the IPL auction.

In 2023, Pooran was drafted by MI New York for the inaugural season of Major League Cricket; in the final, he scored 137 runs from 55 balls, contributing to the team's victory, and was named the player of the season.

In 2025, Pooran had an extremely successful season with the Lucknow Super Giants, scoring 525 runs for the squad. He was in contention for the Orange Cap as well, which is an award for the player with the most runs in an IPL season. He scored 4 fifties in the season, leading his team.

On 16 July 2026 during the MLC, Pooran hit a 31-ball century against the Freedom, as the MI New York hit a record 266, the highest total in the first innings of a knockout match in franchise T20 leagues. His knock was the second fastest hundred in all of franchise T20 cricket as well as the fastest 50 in MLC history, and only behind Chris Gayle's 30-ball ton for RCB.

== International career ==
He made his Twenty20 International (T20I) debut for the West Indies against Pakistan on 23 September 2016. In November 2018, he was named in the West Indies' squad for their tour to India. In the third T20I match, he scored an unbeaten 53 runs off just 25 balls to claim his maiden half-century in T20I cricket.

In February 2019, he was named in the West Indies' One Day International (ODI) for their series against England. He made his ODI debut for the West Indies against England on 20 February 2019. In April 2019, he was named in the West Indies' squad for the 2019 Cricket World Cup. On 1 July 2019, in the match against Sri Lanka, Pooran scored his first century in ODIs. He finished the tournament as the leading run-scorer for the West Indies, with 367 runs in nine matches. Following the World Cup, the International Cricket Council (ICC) named Pooran the rising star of the squad. In July 2019, Cricket West Indies awarded him with a central contract for the first time, ahead of the 2019–20 season.

In November 2019, during the third ODI against Afghanistan, Pooran was found guilty of ball tampering. Pooran admitted the charge, and was banned for four T20I matches.

In July 2021, he was named in the West Indies' squad as the vice captain for their home series against Australia. As Kieron Pollard was eventually ruled out of the T20I series, Pooran captained the West Indies for the first time in T20Is. Pooran led the Windies to a 4–1 win over Australia in the T20I series. In September 2021, Pooran was named as the vice-captain of the West Indies' squad for the 2021 ICC Men's T20 World Cup.

During series against India, Pooran was the highest run scorer in T20I series. He scored 184 runs including three half centuries, highest score of 62. Despite his performance, West Indies lost all three matches.

On 3 May 2022, he was appointed as a captain of West Indies national cricket team for the limited overs format. During the third match of the ODI series against Pakistan, Pooran took his first wicket in international and ODI cricket, with his final figures being 4 for 48. He was named the captain for the West Indies squad for the 2022 ICC Men's T20 World Cup, however, the team suffered an early exit in the first round, after losing 2 out of 3 matches and failed to qualify for the Super 12 round. Post-World Cup, on 21 November 2022, Pooran stepped down as the limited-overs captain of the West Indies team.

In May 2024, he was named in the West Indies squad for the 2024 ICC Men's T20 World Cup tournament. In the tournament, he scored 27 runs off 27 balls against Papua New Guinea, 22 runs off 17 balls against Uganda, and 17 runs off 12 balls against New Zealand. His performance against New Zealand propelled him to 1914 runs, surpassing Chris Gayle's 1899, and becoming the highest run-scorer for the West Indies in T20I Against Afghanistan he scored 98 as the West Indies defeated them by 104 runs.

In June 2025, Pooran announced his retirement from international cricket at the age of 29.
