= Mark Wood (cricketer) =

English cricketer (born 1990)

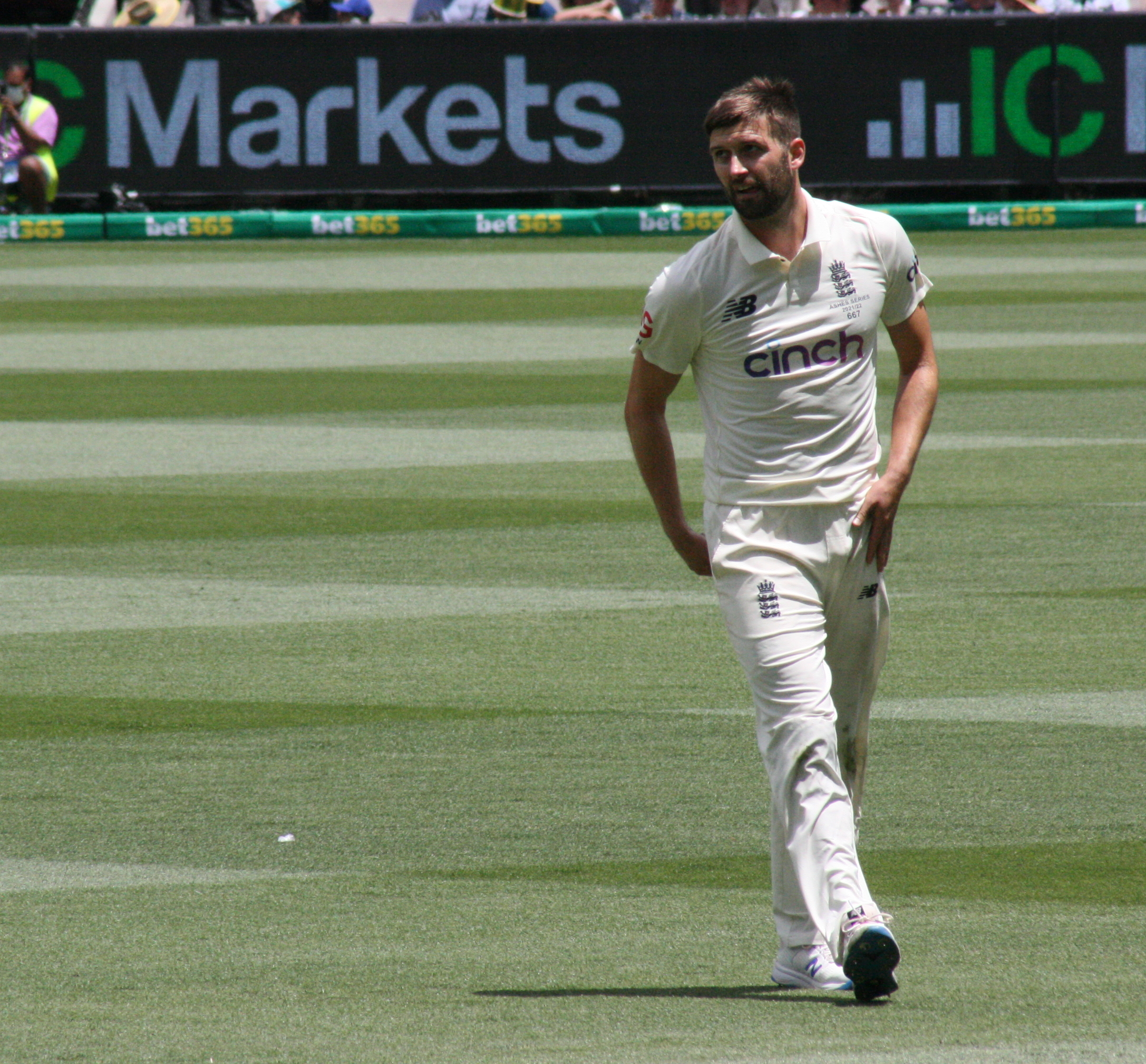
- Mark Wood at the Melbourne cricket ground during the 2021–22 Ashes Series

Personal information
- Full name: Mark Andrew Wood
- Born: 11 January 1990 (age 36); Ashington, Northumberland, England
- Height: 6 ft 0 in (1.83 m)
- Batting: Right-handed
- Bowling: Right-arm fast
- Role: Bowler

International information
- National side: England (2015–2025)
- Test debut (cap 667): 21 May 2015 v New Zealand
- Last Test: 21 November 2025 v Australia
- ODI debut (cap 241): 8 May 2015 v Ireland
- Last ODI: 26 February 2025 v Afghanistan
- ODI shirt no.: 33
- T20I debut (cap 73): 23 June 2015 v New Zealand
- Last T20I: 2 February 2025 v India
- T20I shirt no.: 33

Domestic team information
- Years: Team
- 2008–2010: Northumberland
- 2011–present: Durham (squad no. 33)
- 2018: Chennai Super Kings (squad no. 11)
- 2023: Lucknow Super Giants

Career statistics
Competition	Test	ODI	T20I	FC
Matches	38	70	38	79
Runs scored	811	168	27	1,977
Batting average	15.59	12.92	13.50	19.00
100s/50s	0/1	0/0	0/0	0/5
Top score	52	43*	10*	72*
Balls bowled	6,610	3,506	776	12,728
Wickets	119	80	54	255
Bowling average	30.79	40.82	20.24	27.40
5 wickets in innings	5	0	0	13
10 wickets in match	0	0	0	0
Best bowling	6/37	4/33	3/9	6/37
Catches/stumpings	8/–	14/0	5/0	17/–
Medal record
Men's Cricket
Representing England
ICC Cricket World Cup
Winner	2019 England and Wales
ICC T20 World Cup
Winner	2022 Australia
- Source: ESPNcricinfo, 22 November 2025

Mark Andrew Wood (born 11 January 1990) is an English cricketer who played internationally for England in all formats, before announcing his international retirement in September 2026 due to a reoccurring knee injury. In domestic cricket, he represents Durham, and has played for Chennai Super Kings and Lucknow Super Giants in the Indian Premier League.

Wood made his Test, One Day International (ODI) and Twenty20 International (T20I) debuts in 2015. He was part of the England teams that won the 2019 Cricket World Cup and 2022 T20 World Cup.

Wood plays as a right-handed fast bowler, and is currently one of the fastest bowlers in the world, with an average Test pace of 89 mph since 2020.

== Domestic career ==
=== Minor counties ===
Wood made his debut in county cricket for Northumberland in 2008 against Norfolk in the MCCA Knockout Trophy. He played Minor counties cricket for Northumberland from 2008 to 2010, making 3 Minor Counties Championship appearances and 3 MCCA Knockout Trophy appearances.

=== Durham ===
In the 2011 season, he made his debut for Durham in a first-class match against Durham MCCU. He followed this up by making his List A debut against Northamptonshire in the 2011 Clydesdale Bank 40. He has since made a further first-class appearance against Sri Lanka A, and a further List A appearance against Scotland in the Clydesdale Bank 40. Wood made his debut for the England Lions in their 2014 tour of Sri Lanka.

=== Franchise cricket ===
On 28 January 2018, Wood was bought by Chennai Super Kings for INR 1.5 crores (~£160,000) for the 2018 IPL season. In February 2022, he was bought by the Lucknow Super Giants in the auction for the 2022 Indian Premier League tournament. However, he was ruled out of the tournament due to an elbow injury.

In April 2022, he was bought by the London Spirit for the 2022 season of The Hundred.

== International career ==
=== 2015: West Indies and Ireland ===
In March 2015, Wood was named in the England Test squad for the tour of the West Indies. However, he did not play in the series.

He made his One-Day International debut for England against Ireland on 8 May 2015. The match was affected by rain and little cricket was played, although Wood did take his first international wicket.

=== 2015: New Zealand ===
He made his Test debut for England later the same month against New Zealand. In the first Test Wood took figures of 3–93 in New Zealand's first innings. He then took 1–47 in their second innings to help England win the match by 124 runs and go 1–0 up in the series. In the following Test Wood continued to impress, taking figures of 2–62 in New Zealand's first innings. He also made a useful 19 with the bat. In New Zealand's second innings he took another three wickets, this time at the expense of 97 runs. England lost the match by 199 runs and the series was drawn at 1–1.

Wood played in the third ODI against New Zealand, taking figures of 1–48. In the next game he took figure of 1–49 to help England win by seven wickets and level the series at 2–2. Although Wood did not take a wicket in the final game of the series, taking 0–70, England still won to win the series 3–1.

He made his Twenty20 International debut in the same series on 23 June 2015. He finished with figures of 3–26 as England won by 56 runs.

=== 2015: Ashes series ===
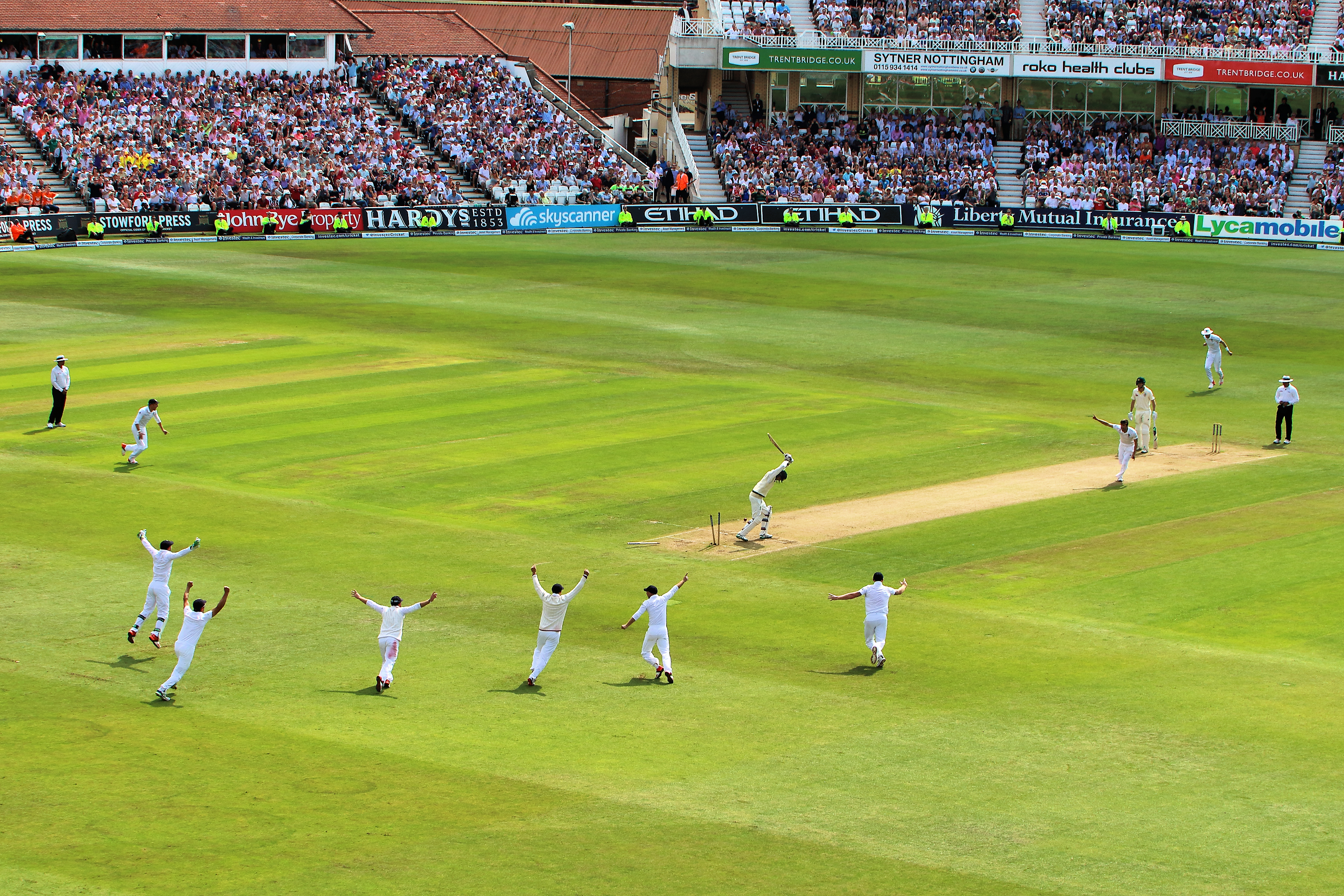
Wood taking the final wicket of the Fourth Test of the 2015 Ashes series at Trent Bridge

Wood took 2–68 in Australia's first innings of the first Ashes Test and followed this up by taking 2–53 in their second innings to help England win the match by 169 runs. In the second Test he only took one wicket in the Australian first innings, finishing with figures of 1–92 as England lost the match by 405 runs. He was ruled out of the third Test through injury, but returned in the fourth Test, taking 1–13 in Australia's first innings. In the second innings he took figures of 3–69 including the wicket that won the match for England, which meant they regained the Ashes. England lost the final Test of the series, with Wood taking 1–59 in Australia first innings. However, England won the series 3–2 to regain the Ashes.

Wood was selected for the first ODI against Australia, although he was expensive, finishing with figures of 1–72 as Australia won the game. He kept his place for the next game, but he again proved expensive, this time finishing with 0–65 from his nine overs, although England went on to win the game by three wickets. After being dropped from the team for the next two games, he returned for the final ODI and took figures of 1–25, although a poor batting performance from England meant they lost the game and the series 3–2.

=== 2015: Pakistan ===
He played in the first Test against Pakistan although he only picked up one wicket in the match, which ended in a draw, as England were unable to force a win due to bad light. He played in the second Test, which England lost, although he performed well. He took 3–39 in Pakistan's first innings and followed this up with another two wickets in the second innings, although Pakistan went on to win the match in convincing fashion, by 178 runs.

An ankle injury ruled Wood out of England's entire series against Sri Lanka, and he also missed the start of the return series against Pakistan.

=== 2016: Pakistan ===
Wood returned from injury in time for the first ODI against Pakistan. He took figures of 1–57 as England won by 44 runs on the D/L Method. He took 3/46 in the next match as England restricted Pakistan to 251 and won the match by four wickets. In the third match of the series he took figures of 1–75 as England won by 169 runs. After missing the fourth match, he returned for the final match of the series and took figures of 2–56, although England lost the match by four wickets, although they won the series 4–1.

=== 2019: West Indies ===
Wood was called up to replace injured Olly Stone in a 3-test tour of the West Indies. He did not play in the first 2 matches, both of which England lost, but was drafted in to the team for the third test in St.Lucia. Wood bowled the fastest of any bowler in the match and in the Windies' first innings took 5 wickets for 41 runs off 8.2 overs – his first five-wicket Test haul helping England to a 142-run lead over West Indies on day two of the final test.

=== 2019 Cricket World Cup ===
In April 2019, he was named in England's squad for the 2019 Cricket World Cup. On 14 June 2019, in the match against the West Indies, Wood took his 50th wicket in ODIs. On 11 July 2019, in the semi-final against Australia, Wood played in his 50th ODI match for England. In the Cricket World Cup Final, Wood, batting at number 11, was run out off the last ball of the match which led to the game going to a Super Over. Wood also sustained an injury during the game, which ruled him out of the first three Tests of the 2019 Ashes series.

=== 2020 – 2022 ===
After missing the 2019 Ashes series and tour of New Zealand, Wood returned to Test cricket in the third test of the 2019–20 tour of South Africa following injuries to James Anderson and Jofra Archer. After scoring 42 runs from 23 balls in England's first innings, he took 3/32 in South Africa's second innings as England won. In the fourth test, Wood took nine wickets, including 5/46 in South Africa's first innings, and scored 35 with the bat as England won again.

On 29 May 2020, Wood was named in a 55-man group of players to begin training ahead of international fixtures starting in England following the COVID-19 pandemic. On 17 June 2020, Wood was included in England's 30-man squad to start training behind closed doors for the Test series against the West Indies. On 4 July 2020, Wood was named in England's thirteen-man squad for the first Test match of the series.

In September 2021, Wood was named in England's squad for the 2021 ICC Men's T20 World Cup.

Wood was selected for the 2021–22 Ashes.

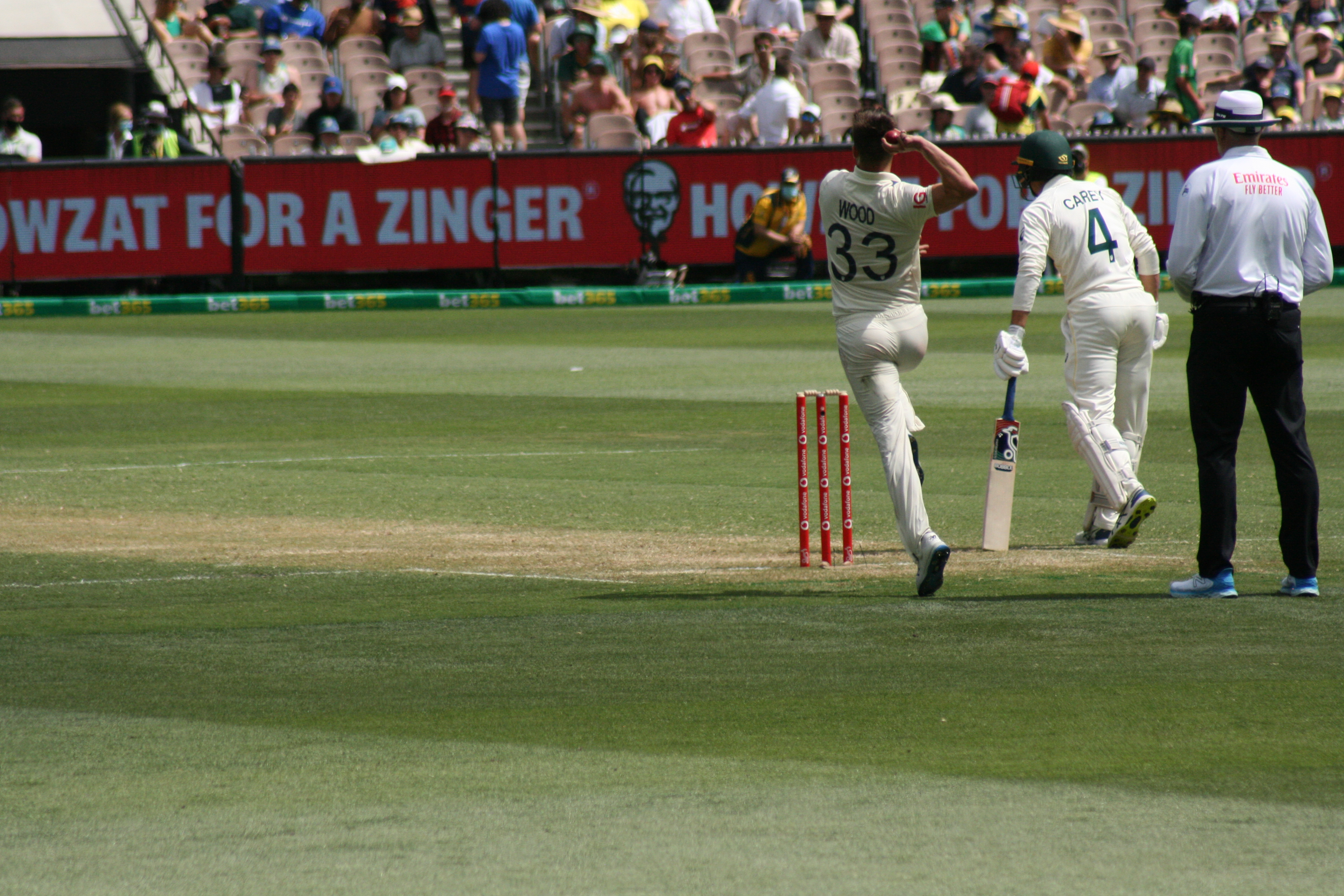
Mark Wood bowling during day 2 of the Boxing Day Test

In September 2022, Wood was named in England's squad for the 2022 ICC Men's T20 world cup in Australia. Wood was the fastest bowler of the tournament and played in every Super 12 game for England before succumbing to injury and missing out on the semi-final and final. England went on to win the tournament, making Wood one of only 6 players to win both the 2019 ODI and 2022 T20 world cups.

=== 2023 ===
Wood was recalled for the Third Test of the 2023 Ashes Series where he was named man of the match. In the match he took a collective 7/100 and scored 40 runs from 16 balls.

=== 2024 ===
In May 2024, he was named in England's squad for the 2024 ICC Men's T20 World Cup tournament. He played five games in the tournament, taking three wickets at an average of 37.66.

In July 2024, Wood was recalled to the England test squad for the series against the West Indies following the retirement of James Anderson.

=== 2025 ===
Wood sustained a medial ligament knee injury in February, during England's Champions Trophy match against Afghanistan. He returned to play the first Ashes test in November, during which the injury recurred. It would be his last match for England.

=== Retirement ===
Wood announced his retirement from international cricket in September 2026, just prior to the expiry of his three-year central contract, after having battled a knee injury from the 2025 Champions Trophy for the previous nineteen months.

== Personal life ==
Wood is married, with a son. He is a teetotaler, and a supporter of the Labour Party. He is a supporter of AFC Wimbledon.
