= Mohsin Khan (Indian cricketer) =

Indian cricketer (born 1998)

Personal information
- Born: 15 July 1998 (age 28); Sambhal, Uttar Pradesh, India
- Height: 6 ft 3 in (191 cm)
- Batting: Left-handed
- Bowling: Left arm medium fast
- Role: Bowler

Domestic team information
- Years: Team
- 2018-present: Uttar Pradesh
- 2022-present: Lucknow Super Giants

Career statistics
Competition	T20	LA	FC
Matches	62	21	1
Runs scored	101	87	8
Batting average	8.41	10.87	8.00
100s/50s	0/0	0/0	0/0
Top score	19	34	8
Balls bowled	1,285	1,097	150
Wickets	80	33	2
Bowling average	20.35	28.27	34.00
5 wickets in innings	0	1	0
10 wickets in match	0	0	0
Best bowling	4/16	6/27	2/42
Catches/stumpings	8/0	4/0	0/0
- Source: ESPNcricinfo, 6 November 2023

Mohsin Khan (born 15 July 1998) is an Indian cricketer who plays for Uttar Pradesh in domestic cricket and Lucknow Super Giants in the Indian Premier League. He made his Twenty20 debut for Uttar Pradesh in the 2017–18 Zonal T20 League on 10 January 2018. In January 2018, he was bought by the Mumbai Indians in the 2018 IPL auction. He made his List A debut for Uttar Pradesh in the 2017–18 Vijay Hazare Trophy on 7 February 2018. In the 2020 IPL auction, he was bought by the Mumbai Indians ahead of the 2020 Indian Premier League. He made his first-class debut on 27 January 2020, for Uttar Pradesh in the 2019–20 Ranji Trophy.

In February 2022, he was bought by the Lucknow Super Giants in the auction for the 2022 Indian Premier League.
