= Ayush Badoni =

Indian cricketer (born 1999)

Personal information
- Born: 3 December 1999 (age 26); Delhi, India
- Height: 5' ft 6' in
- Batting: Right-handed
- Bowling: Right arm off break
- Role: Batting all rounder

Domestic team information
- Years: Team
- 2020/21–: Delhi
- 2022–present: Lucknow Super Giants (squad no. 11)

Career statistics
Competition	FC	LA	T20
Matches	16	18	77
Runs scored	1,370	540	1,263
Batting average	65.23	38.57	28.06
100s/50s	4/4	1/3	0/7
Top score	205*	100	80*
Balls bowled	536	449	194
Wickets	15	11	9
Bowling average	19.53	31.72	27.88
5 wickets in innings	0	0	0
10 wickets in match	0	0	0
Best bowling	4/43	3/29	2/37
Catches/stumpings	7/–	11/–	32/–
Medal record
Men's cricket
Representing India
ACC U19 Asia Cup
Winner	2018 Bangladesh
- Source: ESPNcricinfo, 12 September 2025

Ayush Badoni (born 3 December 1999) is an Indian cricketer who plays for Delhi and Indian Premier League side Lucknow Super Giants. He made his Twenty20 debut on 11 January 2021, for Delhi in the 2020–21 Syed Mushtaq Ali Trophy.

In February 2022, Badoni was bought by Lucknow Super Giants in the auction for the 2022 Indian Premier League. On 28 March 2022, he played in Lucknow's first match of the season, scoring 54 runs. In August 2024, Badoni scored 165 runs from 55 balls, including eight fours and 19 sixes, in a Delhi Premier League match for South Delhi Superstarz. (Note: The Delhi Premier League T20 is not an official Twenty20 competition and operates at a level below official T20 status.)

Ayush Badoni made 205* from 216 balls in a Ranji Trophy match against Jharkhand in 2024.
