= Ravi Bishnoi =

Indian cricketer (born 2000)

Personal information
- Born: 5 September 2000 (age 26); Jodhpur, Rajasthan, India
- Height: 1.70 m (5 ft 7 in)
- Batting: Right-handed
- Bowling: Right-arm legbreak
- Role: Bowler

International information
- National side: India (2022–present)
- Only ODI (cap 255): 6 October 2022 v South Africa
- ODI shirt no.: 56
- T20I debut (cap 95): 16 February 2022 v West Indies
- Last T20I: 17 September 2026 v Afghanistan
- T20I shirt no.: 56

Domestic team information
- Years: Team
- 2018/19–2022/23: Rajasthan
- 2020–2021: Punjab Kings
- 2022–2025: Lucknow Super Giants
- 2023/24–present: Gujarat
- 2026: Rajasthan Royals

Career statistics
| Competition | ODI | T20I | FC | LA |
|---|---|---|---|---|
| Matches | 1 | 47 | 11 | 42 |
| Runs scored | 4 | 65 | 153 | 342 |
| Batting average | - | 9.28 | 10.92 | 17.10 |
| 100s/50s | 0/0 | 0/0 | 0/0 | 0/0 |
| Top score | 4* | 10* | 45 | 40 |
| Balls bowled | 48 | 1,060 | 1,461 | 2,084 |
| Wickets | 1 | 65 | 32 | 64 |
| Bowling average | 69.00 | 20.50 | 26.68 | 28.29 |
| 5 wickets in innings | 0 | 0 | 1 | 0 |
| 10 wickets in match | 0 | 0 | 0 | 0 |
| Best bowling | 1/69 | 4/13 | 5/76 | 4/17 |
| Catches/stumpings | 0/– | 16/– | 4/– | 7/– |
Medal record
Men's cricket
Representing India
Asian Games
| Gold medal – first place | 2022 Hangzhou |
| Gold medal – first place | 2026 Aichi-Nagoya |
ICC U19 World Cup
| Runner-up | 2020 South Africa |
- Source: Cricinfo, 24 July 2026

Ravi Bishnoi (born 5 September 2000) is an Indian international cricketer. He plays for the India national team as a right-arm leg-break bowler. Bishnoi represents Gujarat in domestic cricket and Rajasthan Royals in the Indian Premier League.

== Early life ==
Bishnoi was born in Jodhpur, Rajasthan. Due to the lack of cricket culture and facilities in West Rajasthan, he, along with his friends and with the help of two coaches, Pradyot Singh Rathore and Shahrukh Pathan, built a cricket academy named Spartans Cricket Academy where they themselves did all the masonry work owing to financial difficulties so that he could train. He was snubbed for the U-16 trials once and for the U-19 trial twice by the selectors before his coaches asked them to give him another chance and finally got selected for the U-19 Rajasthan squad. In March 2018, he was called up by Rajasthan Royals as a net bowler.

== Domestic career ==
He made his Twenty20 debut for Rajasthan in the 2018–19 Syed Mushtaq Ali Trophy on 21 February 2019. He made his List A debut on 27 September 2019, for Rajasthan in the 2019–20 Vijay Hazare Trophy. In October 2019, he was named in India A's squad for the 2019–20 Deodhar Trophy.

=== Indian Premier League ===
In December 2019, in the 2020 IPL auction, he was bought by Kings XI Punjab ahead of the 2020 Indian Premier League. On 20 September 2020, Bishnoi made his IPL debut against Delhi Capitals and picked up Rishabh Pant as his maiden wicket and finished with the bowling figures 1/22 in four overs, but ended up on the losing team. He finished the season with 12 wickets and was nominated for the Emerging Player award.

In February 2022, Bishnoi was drafted in by the new franchise Lucknow Super Giants ahead of the 2022 Indian Premier League tournament.

== International career ==
In December 2019, he was named in India's squad for the 2020 Under-19 Cricket World Cup. On 21 January 2020, in India's match against Japan, Bishnoi took four wickets without conceding a run, before finishing his spell with four wickets for five runs from eight overs, with India winning by ten wickets, and he was named the man of the match. He finished the tournament as the leading wicket-taker.

In January 2022, Bishnoi was named in India's One Day International (ODI) and Twenty20 International (T20I) squads for their home series against the West Indies. He made his T20I debut on 16 February 2022, for India against the West Indies cricket team, taking two wickets for 17 runs and being named the player of the match. In October 2022, he was named in India's ODI squad, for their series against South Africa. He made his ODI debut on 6 October 2022 against the South Africa. Following a successful tour, Ravi Bishnoi received Cap no. 95 for India on 16 February 2022. Building on this accomplishment, he later secured his ODI Cap no. 255 on 6 October 2022. In November 2023, he was selected in India's squad for the five match T20 series against Australia, where he impressed with a series leading 9 wickets at an average of 18.22. In the first match, he conceded 54 runs off his 4 overs, picking up just 1 wicket. In the second match, he bowled an impressive spell, picking up 3 wickets for just 32 runs.
