= 2026 Kolkata Knight Riders season =

Indian Premier League cricket team

Kolkata Knight Riders
2026 season
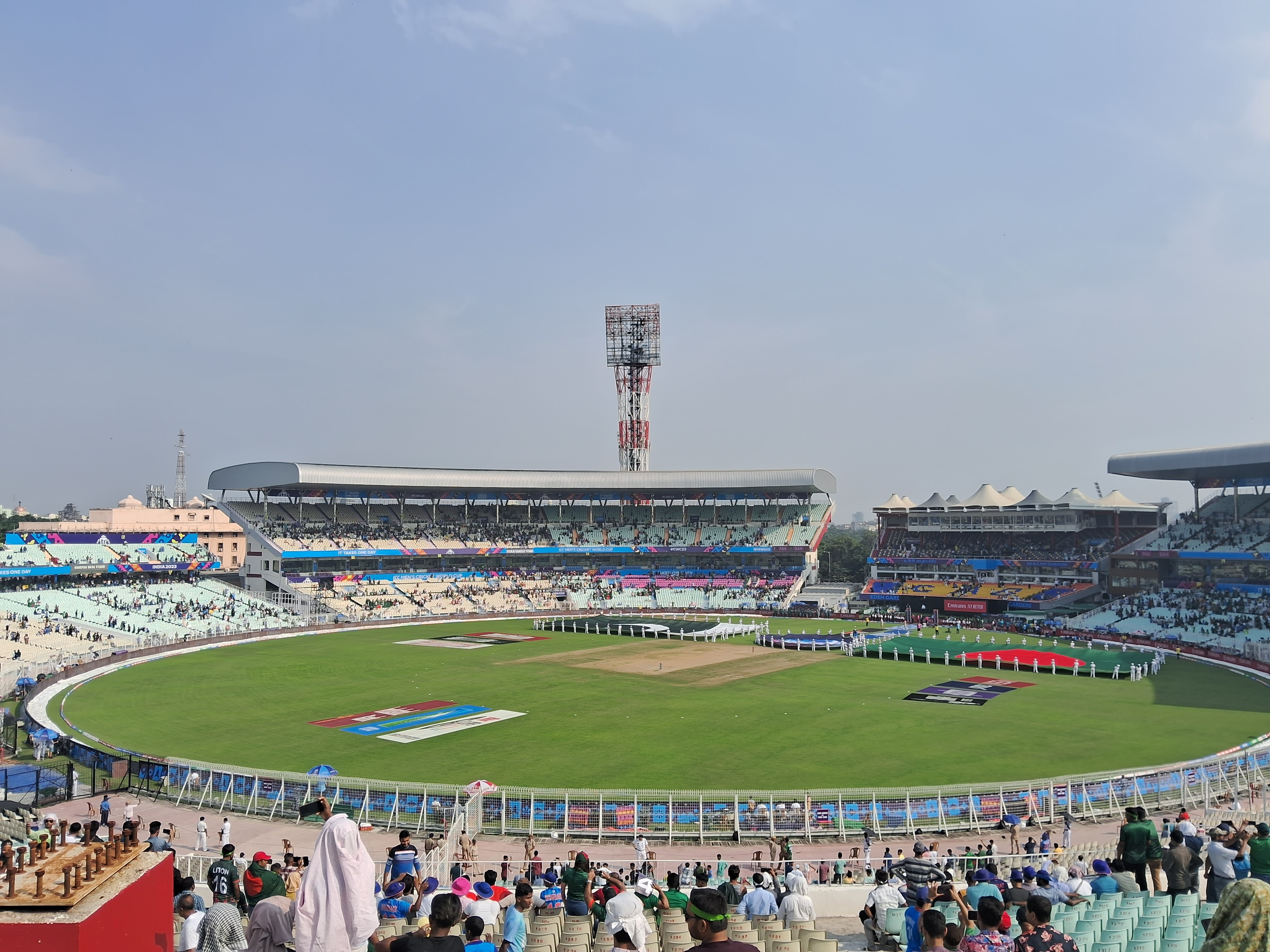
- Eden Gardens, home ground of Kolkata Knight Riders
- Coach: Abhishek Nayar
- Captain: Ajinkya Rahane
- Ground(s): Eden Gardens, Kolkata
- League stage: 7th place
- Most runs: Angkrish Raghuvanshi (422)
- Most wickets: Kartik Tyagi (18)
- Most catches: Rinku Singh (10)
- Most wicket-keeping dismissals: Angkrish Raghuvanshi (4)

The 2026 season was Kolkata Knight Riders' nineteenth appearance in the Indian Premier League (IPL). They were one of the ten cricket teams that competed in the 2026 IPL. The team was captained by Ajinkya Rahane and coached by Abhishek Nayar.

Kolkata Knight Riders were one of the last teams to be eliminated from the 2026 IPL and finished the season in seventh place with six wins from 14 matches. Angkrish Raghuvanshi scored the most runs (422) while Kartik Tyagi took the most wickets (18) for Kolkata in the 2026 season.

== Pre-season ==
The 2026 Indian Premier League was the 19th edition of the Indian Premier League (IPL), a professional Twenty20 (T20) cricket league held in India, organised by the Board of Control for Cricket in India (BCCI). Kolkata Knight Riders had won the IPL title three times. The team finished in eighth place in the previous season. The tournament featured ten teams competing in 74 matches from 28 March to 31 May 2026. Kolkata played all their home matches at Eden Gardens.

=== Player retention ===
Franchises were allowed to retain any number of players from their squad, including traded players while excluding players signed as temporary replacements. Franchises were required to submit their retention lists before 15 November 2025. Kolkata retained twelve players, including captain Ajinkya Rahane. Kolkata also traded Mayank Markande to Mumbai Indians.

Retained players
Domestic		Overseas
Vaibhav Arora; Varun Chakravarthy; Umran Malik; Manish Pandey; Angkrish Raghuvanshi	Ajinkya Rahane; Harshit Rana; Anukul Roy; Ramandeep Singh; Rinku Singh	Sunil Narine; Rovman Powell

Released players
Batters	Wicket-keepers	All-rounders	Bowlers
Venkatesh Iyer; Shivam Shukla	Rahmanullah Gurbaz; Quinton de Kock	Moeen Ali; Andre Russell (Note: Andre Russell announced his retirement from IPL in November 2025.); Luvnith Sisodia	Spencer Johnson; Mayank Markande (Note: Kolkata Knight Riders traded Mayank Markande to Mumbai Indians.); Anrich Nortje; Chetan Sakariya

=== Auction ===
The season's auction took place on 16 December 2025 in Abu Dhabi, United Arab Emirates. The auction purse for each franchise was set at ₹125 crore (US$13 million), with franchises being deducted an amount from the purse for every retained player. Kolkata had a purse remaining of ₹64.3 crore (US$6.9 million). Kolkata bought thirteen players in the auction, including eight capped players and six overseas players.

Auctioned players
Domestic		Overseas	
Capped	Uncapped	Capped	Uncapped
Akash Deep; Rahul Tripathi	Tejasvi Singh; Kartik Tyagi; Prashant Solanki; Sarthak Ranjan; Daksh Kamra	Cameron Green; Rachin Ravindra; Finn Allen; Matheesha Pathirana; Tim Seifert; Mustafizur Rahman	—N/a

== Squad ==
- Players with international caps as of start of 2026 IPL are listed in **bold**.
- Ages are as of 28 March 2026.
- Withdrawn players are indicated by a dagger symbol (†) and placed at the bottom of the table.

Kolkata Knight Riders squad for the 2026 Indian Premier League
S/N	Name	Nationality	Birth date	Batting style	Bowling style	Salary	Notes
3	**Ajinkya Rahane**	India	6 June 1988 (aged 37)	Right-handed	Right-arm medium	₹1.5 crore (US$160,000)	Captain
4	Sarthak Ranjan	India	25 September 1996 (aged 29)	Right-handed	Right-arm leg-break	₹30 lakh (US$32,000)	
8	**Rachin Ravindra**	New Zealand	18 November 1999 (aged 26)	Left-handed	Left-arm orthodox	₹2 crore (US$210,000)	Overseas
9	**Manish Pandey**	India	10 September 1989 (aged 36)	Right-handed	Right-arm medium	₹75 lakh (US$80,000)	
14	Vaibhav Arora	India	14 December 1997 (aged 28)	Right-handed	Right-arm fast-medium	₹1.8 crore (US$190,000)	
16	**Finn Allen**	New Zealand	22 April 1999 (aged 26)	Right-handed	Right-arm off-break	₹2 crore (US$210,000)	Overseas
18	Angkrish Raghuvanshi	India	5 June 2004 (aged 21)	Right-handed	Right-arm off-break	₹3 crore (US$320,000)	
19	**Ramandeep Singh**	India	13 April 1997 (aged 28)	Right-handed	Right-arm medium	₹4 crore (US$430,000)	
21	Tejasvi Singh	India	18 April 2002 (aged 23)	Right-handed	—N/a	₹3 crore (US$320,000)	
23	Navdeep Saini	India	23 November 1992 (aged 33)	Right-handed	Right-arm fast	₹75 lakh (US$80,000)	Replacement (Note: Navdeep Saini replaced Harshit Rana, after the latter withdrew due to knee injury.)
24	**Umran Malik**	India	22 November 1999 (aged 26)	Right-handed	Right-arm fast	₹75 lakh (US$80,000)	
26	Kartik Tyagi	India	8 November 2000 (aged 25)	Right-handed	Right-arm fast-medium	₹30 lakh (US$32,000)	
28	**Rahul Tripathi**	India	2 March 1991 (aged 35)	Right-handed	Right-arm medium	₹75 lakh (US$80,000)	
29	**Varun Chakravarthy**	India	29 August 1991 (aged 34)	Right-handed	Right-arm leg-break	₹12 crore (US$1.3 million)	
33	Saurabh Dubey	India	23 January 1998 (aged 28)	Right-handed	Left-arm fast-medium	₹30 lakh (US$32,000)	Replacement (Note: Saurabh Dubey replaced Akash Deep, after the latter withdrew due to lower-back injury.)
35	**Rinku Singh**	India	12 October 1997 (aged 28)	Left-handed	Right-arm off-break	₹13 crore (US$1.4 million)	
40	**Blessing Muzarabani**	Zimbabwe	2 October 1996 (aged 29)	Right-handed	Right-arm fast-medium	₹75 lakh (US$80,000)	Overseas; replacement (Note: Blessing Muzarabani replaced Mustafizur Rahman, after the latter was released per the BCCI request.)
42	**Cameron Green**	Australia	3 June 1999 (aged 26)	Right-handed	Right-arm fast-medium	₹25.2 crore (US$2.7 million)	Overseas
43	**Tim Seifert**	New Zealand	14 December 1994 (aged 31)	Right-handed	—N/a	₹1.5 crore (US$160,000)	Overseas
45	Anukul Roy	India	30 November 1998 (aged 27)	Left-handed	Left-arm orthodox	₹40 lakh (US$43,000)	
52	**Rovman Powell**	West Indies	23 July 1993 (aged 32)	Right-handed	Right-arm medium	₹1.5 crore (US$160,000)	Overseas
63	Daksh Kamra	India	9 January 2003 (aged 23)	Right-handed	Right-arm leg-break	₹30 lakh (US$32,000)	
74	**Sunil Narine**	West Indies	26 May 1988 (aged 37)	Left-handed	Right-arm off-break	₹12 crore (US$1.3 million)	Overseas
—N/a	Luvnith Sisodia	India	15 January 2000 (aged 26)	Left-handed	Left-arm medium	₹30 lakh (US$32,000)	Replacement (Note: Luvnith Sisodia replaced Matheesha Pathirana, after the latter withdrew due to hamstring injury.)
—N/a	Prashant Solanki	India	22 February 2000 (aged 26)	Right-handed	Right-arm leg-break	₹30 lakh (US$32,000)	
22	**Harshit Rana** †	India	22 December 2001 (aged 24)	Right-handed	Right-arm fast-medium	₹4 crore (US$430,000)	Withdrawn
81	**Matheesha Pathirana** †	Sri Lanka	18 December 2002 (aged 23)	Right-handed	Right-arm fast	₹18 crore (US$1.9 million)	Overseas; withdrawn
—N/a	**Akash Deep** †	India	15 December 1996 (aged 29)	Right-handed	Right-arm fast-medium	₹1 crore (US$110,000)	Withdrawn
—N/a	**Mustafizur Rahman** †	Bangladesh	6 September 1995 (aged 30)	Right-handed	Right-arm fast-medium	₹9.2 crore (US$980,000)	Overseas; withdrawn

== Support staff ==
Abhishek Nayar replaced Chandrakant Pandit as the head coach while Shane Watson replaced Ottis Gibson as an assistant coach and Tim Southee replaced Bharat Arun and Carl Crowe as bowling coach. Dishant Yagnik also joined the squad as a fielding coach.

Position	Name
Head coach	Abhishek Nayar
Assistant coach	Shane Watson
Bowling coach	Tim Southee
Fielding coach	Dishant Yagnik
Mentor	Dwayne Bravo

- Source: News18

== League stage ==
Kolkata Knight Riders began their season with two losses to Mumbai and Sunrisers Hyderabad. Their third match against Punjab Kings was abandoned due to rain. They lost their next three matches to Lucknow Super Giants, Chennai Super Kings and Gujarat Titans. This was the first time Kolkata did not win any of their opening matches in a season. The won their next four matches against Rajasthan Royals, Lucknow, Hyderabad and Delhi Capitals; lost to Royal Challengers Bengaluru and won against Gujarat and Mumbai. They lost their last game of the season to Delhi to finish the league stage at the seventh place with thirteen points and were eliminated.

=== Points table ===
League stage standings
Pos	Grp	Team	Pld	W	L	NR	Pts	NRR	Qualification
1	A	Royal Challengers Bengaluru (C)	14	9	5	0	18	0.783	Advanced to Qualifier 1
2	B	Gujarat Titans (R)	14	9	5	0	18	0.695	Advanced to Qualifier 1
3	B	Sunrisers Hyderabad (4th)	14	9	5	0	18	0.524	Advanced to Eliminator
4	A	Rajasthan Royals (3rd)	14	8	6	0	16	0.189	Advanced to Eliminator
5	A	Punjab Kings	14	7	6	1	15	0.309	Eliminated
6	B	Delhi Capitals	14	7	7	0	14	−0.651	Eliminated
7	A	Kolkata Knight Riders	14	6	7	1	13	−0.147	Eliminated
8	A	Chennai Super Kings	14	6	8	0	12	−0.345	Eliminated
9	B	Mumbai Indians	14	4	10	0	8	−0.584	Eliminated
10	B	Lucknow Super Giants	14	4	10	0	8	−0.740	Eliminated

Source: ESPNcricinfo
Rules for classification: 1) Points; 2) Wins; 3) Net run rate; 4) Wickets taken per fair deliveries; 5) drawing lots
(C) Champions; (R) Runners-up

=== League progression ===
League progression
Team	Group matches														Playoffs		
Team	1	2	3	4	5	6	7	8	9	10	11	12	13	14	Q1/E	Q2	F
Kolkata Knight Riders	0	0	1	1	1	1	3	5	7	9	9	11	13	13			

Win	Loss	No result

- Note: The total points at the end of each group match are listed.
- Note: Click on the points (group matches) or W/L (playoffs) to see the match summary.

=== Fixtures ===
Match 2
29 March 2026
19:30 (N)
Scorecard

Kolkata Knight Riders; 220/4 (20 overs)	v	Mumbai Indians (H); 224/4 (19.1 overs)
Ajinkya Rahane 67 (40); Shardul Thakur 3/39 (4 overs)		Ryan Rickelton 81 (43); Sunil Narine 1/30 (3 overs)

Mumbai Indians won by 6 wickets
Wankhede Stadium, Mumbai
Umpires: Saidarshan Kumar (Ind) and Anish Sahasrabudhe (Ind)
Player of the match: Shardul Thakur (Mumbai Indians)

- Mumbai Indians won the toss and elected to field.
- Mumbai Indians became the first franchise to play in 300 T20 matches.
- Allah Ghazanfar (Mumbai Indians), Finn Allen and Blessing Muzarabani (Kolkata Knight Riders) all made their IPL debuts.
- Ajinkya Rahane (Kolkata Knight Riders) played in his 200th IPL match.
- This was Mumbai Indians' highest successful run chase in the IPL.
- For the first time since the 2012 season, Mumbai Indians won their opening match.

Match 6
2 April 2026
19:30 (N)
Scorecard

Sunrisers Hyderabad; 226/8 (20 overs)	v	Kolkata Knight Riders (H); 161 (16 overs)
Heinrich Klaasen 52 (35); Blessing Muzarabani 4/41 (4 overs)		Angkrish Raghuvanshi 52 (29); Jaydev Unadkat 3/21 (3 overs)

Sunrisers Hyderabad won by 65 runs
Eden Gardens, Kolkata
Umpires: Vinod Seshan (Ind) and Saidarshan Kumar (Ind)
Player of the match: Nitish Kumar Reddy (Sunrisers Hyderabad)

- Kolkata Knight Riders won the toss and elected to field.
- Abhishek Sharma became the first Indian player and overall second player to hit 100 sixes for Sunrisers Hyderabad.

Match 12
6 April 2026
19:30 (N)
Scorecard

Kolkata Knight Riders (H); 25/2 (3.4 overs)	v	Punjab Kings
Ajinkya Rahane 8* (6); Xavier Bartlett 2/9 (1.4 overs)

No result
Eden Gardens, Kolkata
Umpires: Abhijeet Bengeri (Ind) and Jayaraman Madanagopal (Ind)

- Kolkata Knight Riders won the toss and elected to bat.
- No further play was possible due to rain.

Match 15
9 April 2026
19:30 (N)
Scorecard

Kolkata Knight Riders (H); 181/4 (20 overs)	v	Lucknow Super Giants; 182/7 (20 overs)
Angkrish Raghuvanshi 45 (33); Digvesh Rathi 1/25 (4 overs)		Mukul Choudhary 54* (27); Anukul Roy 2/32 (4 overs)

Lucknow Super Giants won by 3 wickets
Eden Gardens, Kolkata
Umpires: Adrian Holdstock (SA) and Akshay Totre (Ind)
Player of the match: Mukul Choudhary (Lucknow Super Giants)

- Lucknow Super Giants won the toss and elected to field.

Match 22
14 April 2026
19:30 (N)
Scorecard

Chennai Super Kings (H); 192/5 (20 overs)	v	Kolkata Knight Riders; 160/7 (20 overs)
Sanju Samson 48 (32); Kartik Tyagi 2/35 (4 overs)		Ramandeep Singh 35 (23); Noor Ahmad 3/21 (4 overs)

Chennai Super Kings won by 32 runs
M. A. Chidambaram Stadium, Chennai
Umpires: Nitin Menon (Ind) and Saidharshan Kumar (Ind)
Player of the match: Noor Ahmad (Chennai Super Kings)

- Kolkata Knight Riders won the toss and elected to field.

Match 25
17 April 2026
19:30 (N)
Scorecard

Kolkata Knight Riders; 180 (20 overs)	v	Gujarat Titans (H); 181/5 (19.4 overs)
Cameron Green 79 (55); Kagiso Rabada 3/29 (4 overs)		Shubman Gill 86 (50); Varun Chakravarthy 2/34 (4 overs)

Gujarat Titans won by 5 wickets
Narendra Modi Stadium, Ahmedabad
Umpires: Rohan Pandit (Ind) and Ulhas Gandhe (Ind)
Player of the match: Shubman Gill (Gujarat Titans)

- Kolkata Knight Riders won the toss and elected to bat.
- Jos Buttler (Gujarat Titans) became the fourth player to take 300 catches in T20s.

Match 28
19 April 2026
15:30 (D/N)
Scorecard

Rajasthan Royals; 155/9 (20 overs)	v	Kolkata Knight Riders (H); 161/6 (19.4 overs)
Vaibhav Sooryavanshi 46 (28); Varun Chakravarthy 3/14 (4 overs)		Rinku Singh 53* (34); Ravindra Jadeja 2/8 (3 overs)

Kolkata Knight Riders won by 4 wickets
Eden Gardens, Kolkata
Umpires: Kumar Dharmasena (SL) and Mohit Krishnadas (Ind)
Player of the match: Varun Chakravarthy (Kolkata Knight Riders)

- Rajasthan Royals won the toss and elected to bat.

Match 38
26 April 2026
19:30 (N)
Scorecard

Kolkata Knight Riders; 155/7 (20 overs)	v	Lucknow Super Giants (H); 155/8 (20 overs)
Rinku Singh 83* (51); Mohsin Khan 5/23 (4 overs)		Rishabh Pant 42 (38); Vaibhav Arora 2/24 (4 overs)

Match tied (Kolkata Knight Riders won the Super Over)
Ekana Cricket Stadium, Lucknow
Umpires: Abhijeet Bengeri (Ind) and Keyur Kelkar (Ind)
Player of the match: Rinku Singh (Kolkata Knight Riders)

- Lucknow Super Giants won the toss and elected to field.
- Super Over: Lucknow Super Giants 1/2 (0.3 overs), Kolkata Knight Riders 4/0 (0.1 overs)

Match 45
3 May 2026
15:30 (D/N)
Scorecard

Sunrisers Hyderabad (H); 165 (19 overs)	v	Kolkata Knight Riders; 169/3 (18.2 overs)
Travis Head 61 (28); Varun Chakravarthy 3/36 (4 overs)		Angkrish Raghuvanshi 59 (47); Sakib Hussain 1/17 (3 overs)

Kolkata Knight Riders won by 7 wickets
Rajiv Gandhi International Cricket Stadium, Hyderabad
Umpires: Abhijeet Bengeri (Ind) and Jayaraman Madanagopal (Ind)
Player of the match: Varun Chakravarthy (Kolkata Knight Riders)

- Sunrisers Hyderabad won the toss and elected to bat.
- Smaran Ravichandran (Sunrisers Hyderabad) made his IPL debut.
- Sunil Narine (Kolkata Knight Riders) became the first overseas player to take 200 wickets in IPL.

Match 51
8 May 2026
19:30 (N)
Scorecard

Delhi Capitals (H); 142/8 (20 overs)	v	Kolkata Knight Riders; 147/2 (14.2 overs)
Pathum Nissanka 50 (29); Kartik Tyagi 2/25 (4 overs)		Finn Allen 100* (47); Axar Patel 1/27 (4 overs)

Kolkata Knight Riders won by 8 wickets
Arun Jaitley Cricket Stadium, New Delhi
Umpires: Nitin Menon (Ind) and Rohan Pandit (Ind)
Player of the match: Finn Allen (Kolkata Knight Riders)

- Kolkata Knight Riders won the toss and elected to field.
- Finn Allen (Kolkata Knight Riders) scored his maiden century in IPL.

Match 57
13 May 2026
19:30 (N)
Scorecard

Kolkata Knight Riders; 192/4 (20 overs)	v	Royal Challengers Bengaluru (H); 194/4 (19.1 overs)
Angkrish Raghuvanshi 71 (46); Bhuvneshwar Kumar 1/34 (4 overs)		Virat Kohli 105* (60); Kartik Tyagi 3/32 (4 overs)

Royal Challengers Bengaluru won by 6 wickets
Shaheed Veer Narayan Singh International Cricket Stadium, Raipur
Umpires: Nitin Menon (Ind) and Rohan Pandit (Ind)
Player of the match: Virat Kohli (Royal Challengers Bengaluru)

- Royal Challengers Bengaluru won the toss and elected to field.
- Saurabh Dubey (Kolkata Knight Riders) made his IPL debut.
- Virat Kohli (Royal Challengers Bengaluru) became the fastest player to score 14,000 runs in T20s, in terms of innings played (409). He also became the first Indian player to score 10 centuries in T20s.

Match 60
16 May 2026
19:30 (N)
Scorecard

Kolkata Knight Riders (H); 247/2 (20 overs)	v	Gujarat Titans; 218/4 (20 overs)
Finn Allen 93 (35); Sai Kishore 1/38 (3 overs)		Shubman Gill 85 (49); Sunil Narine 2/29 (4 overs)

Kolkata Knight Riders won by 29 runs
Eden Gardens, Kolkata
Umpires: Virender Sharma (Ind) and Kannur Swaroopanand (Ind)
Player of the match: Sunil Narine (Kolkata Knight Riders)

- Gujarat Titans won the toss and elected to field.
- Kolkata Knight Riders became the second IPL team to play in 100 matches at a home venue.
- Sunil Narine (Kolkata Knight Riders) became the first overseas player to play in 200 IPL matches.
- Cameron Green (Kolkata Knight Riders) scored his 1,000th run in IPL.

Match 65
20 May 2026
19:30 (N)
Scorecard

Mumbai Indians; 147/8 (20 overs)	v	Kolkata Knight Riders (H); 148/6 (18.5 overs)
Corbin Bosch 32* (18); Cameron Green 2/23 (3 overs)		Manish Pandey 45 (33); Corbin Bosch 3/30 (3 overs)

Kolkata Knight Riders won by 4 wickets
Eden Gardens, Kolkata
Umpires: Saiyed Khalid (Ind) and Kannur Swaroopanand (Ind)
Player of the match: Manish Pandey (Kolkata Knight Riders)

- Kolkata Knight Riders won the toss and elected to field.
- Tejasvi Singh Dahiya (Kolkata Knight Riders) made his IPL debut. He replaced Angkrish Raghuvanshi as a concussion substitute after the batter got injured during the first innings.

Match 70
24 May 2026
19:30 (N)
Scorecard

Delhi Capitals; 203/5 (20 overs)	v	Kolkata Knight Riders (H); 163 (18.4 overs)
KL Rahul 60 (30); Saurabh Dubey 2/28 (4 overs)		Ajinkya Rahane 63 (39); Lungi Ngidi 3/27 (3.4 overs)

Delhi Capitals won by 40 runs
Eden Gardens, Kolkata
Umpires: Saiyed Khalid (Ind) and Kannur Swaroopanand (Ind)
Player of the match: Kuldeep Yadav (Delhi Capitals)

- Kolkata Knight Riders won the toss and elected to field.

== Statistics ==
Most runs
Runs	Player
422	Angkrish Raghuvanshi
349	Finn Allen
335	Ajinkya Rahane
322	Cameron Green
295	Rinku Singh

Most wickets
Wickets	Player
18	Kartik Tyagi
15	Sunil Narine
11	Varun Chakravarthy
11	Vaibhav Arora
9	Anukul Roy
