= List of Kolkata Knight Riders records =

Kolkata Knight Riders (KKR) are a franchise cricket team based in Kolkata, India, which plays in the Indian Premier League (IPL). They are one of the ten teams that are competing in the Indian Premier League. Their current captain is Ajinkya Rahane and their coach is Abhishek Nayar.

== Listing ==
=== Criteria ===
Generally, the top five are listed in each category, except when there is a tie for the last position among the five; in that case, all the tied record holders are noted.

=== Notation ===
Team notation

- (200–3): This means a team scored 200 runs for 3 wickets, and the innings concluded either due to a successful run chase or because no playing time remained.
- (200): This indicates that a team scored 200 runs and was all out.

Batting notation

- (100): This denotes that a batsman scored 100 runs and was out.
- (100*): This indicates that a batsman scored 100 runs and was not out.

Bowling notation

- (5–20): This signifies that a bowler took 5 wickets while conceding 20 runs.

Active players

- (**Player Name**): This symbol indicates that the players who are currently playing for the team are in **bold**.

== Team history ==
=== Results by season ===
Indian Premier League

Year	Total	Wins	Losses	NR/MA	Tied and won	Tied and lost	Win %	Position	Summary
2008	13	6	7	1	0	0	46.15	6th	League stage
2009	13	3	9	1	0	1	23.07	8th	League stage
2010	14	7	7	0	0	0	50.00	6th	League stage
2011	15	8	7	0	0	0	53.33	4th	Play-offs
2012	17	12	5	1	0	0	70.59	**1st**	**Champions**
2013	16	6	10	0	0	0	37.50	7th	League stage
2014	16	11	4	0	0	1	68.75	**1st**	**Champions**
2015	13	7	6	1	0	0	53.85	5th	League stage
2016	15	8	7	0	0	0	53.33	4th	Play-offs
2017	16	9	7	0	0	0	56.25	3rd	Play-offs
2018	16	9	7	0	0	0	56.25	3rd	Play-offs
2019	14	6	7	0	0	1	42.86	5th	League stage
2020	14	6	7	0	1	0	50.00	5th	League stage
2021	17	9	8	0	0	0	52.94	2nd	Runners-up
2022	14	6	8	0	0	0	42.86	7th	League stage
2023	14	6	8	0	0	0	42.86	7th	League stage
2024	16	11	3	2	0	0	68.75	**1st**	**Champions**
2025	14	5	7	2	0	0	35.71	8th	League stage
2026	14	6	7	1	0	0	42.86	7th	League stage
Total	**283**	**140**	**130**	**9**	**1**	**3**	**49.47**	**3 titles**	
Last updated: 24 May 2026

Champions League T20

Year	Total	Wins	Losses	NR/MA	Tied and won	Tied and lost	Win %	Position	Summary
2011	6	3	3	0	0	0	50.00	5th	Group Stage
2012	4	1	2	1	0	0	25.00	6th	Group Stage
2014	6	5	1	0	0	0	83.33	2nd	Runners-up
Total	**16**	**9**	**6**	**1**	**0**	**0**	**56.25**	**0 titles**	
Last updated: 4 October 2014

=== Head-to-head records ===
Indian Premier League

Opponent	Period	Total	Wins	Losses	NR/MA	Win%
Active teams
Chennai Super Kings	2008–2015, 2018–	33	11	21	1	34.38
Delhi Capitals / Delhi Daredevils	2008–	37	20	16	1	55.56
Gujarat Titans	2022–	7	2	4	1	33.33
Lucknow Super Giants	2022–	8	3	5	0	37.50
Mumbai Indians	2008–	37	12	25	0	32.43
Punjab Kings / Kings XI Punjab	2008–	36	21	13	2	58.33
Rajasthan Royals	2008–2015, 2018–	33	17	14	2	51.52
Royal Challengers Bengaluru	2008–	37	20	16	1	55.56
Sunrisers Hyderabad	2013–	32	21	11	0	65.63
Defunct teams
Deccan Chargers^{†}	2008–2012	9	7	2	1	77.78
Gujarat Lions^{†}	2016–2017	4	1	3	0	25.00
Kochi Tuskers Kerala^{†}	2011	2	0	2	0	00.00
Pune Warriors India^{†}	2011–2013	5	4	1	0	80.00
Rising Pune Supergiant^{†}	2016–2017	4	3	1	0	75.00
**Last updated:- 24 May 2026** Note:-: The result percentage excludes no results.; The total matches does not include matches played for Champions League T20.; †No longer exists.

Champions League T20

Opponent	Period	Total	Wins	Losses	NR/MA	Win%
(New Zealand) Auckland Aces	2011–2012	2	1	1	0	50.00
(India) Chennai Super Kings	2014	2	1	1	0	50.00
(India) Delhi Daredevils	2012	1	0	1	0	00.00
(South Africa) Dolphins	2014	1	1	0	0	100.00
(Australia) Hobart Hurricanes	2014	1	1	0	0	100.00
(Pakistan) Lahore Lions	2014	1	1	0	0	100.00
(Australia) Perth Scorchers	2012–2014	2	1	0	1	100.00
(India) Royal Challengers Bangalore	2011	1	1	0	0	100.00
(England) Somerset Sabres	2011	2	0	2	0	00.00
(Australia) Southern Redbacks	2011	1	0	1	0	00.00
(South Africa) Titans	2012	1	1	0	0	100.00
(South Africa) Chevrolet Warriors	2011	1	1	0	0	100.00

=== Most consecutive victories ===
Wins	Start date	End date	Captain
10 Wins	7 May 2014	8 April 2015	Gautam Gambhir
6 Wins	18 April 2012	7 May 2012	Gautam Gambhir
6 Wins	29 April 2024	26 May 2024	Shreyas Iyer
5 Wins	16 May 2012	3 April 2013	Gautam Gambhir
4 Wins	18 May 2009	14 March 2010	Brendon McCullum Sourav Ganguly
4 Wins	12 May 2018	23 May 2018	Dinesh Karthik
4 Wins	3 October 2021	13 October 2021	Eoin Morgan
4 Wins	19 April 2026	13 May 2026	**Ajinkya Rahane**
Last updated: 13 May 2026

=== Most consecutive victories at home ===
The Eden Gardens serve as the primary home ground for the Kolkata Knight Riders. (Note: This does not include the matches played at the JSCA International Cricket Stadium, which served as the secondary home base for the team during the 2013 Indian Premier League)

Wins	Start date	End date	Captain
7 Wins	26 April 2013	8 April 2015	Gautam Gambhir
5 Wins	7 April 2010	17 April 2011	Sourav Ganguly Gautam Gambhir
5 Wins	30 April 2015	10 April 2016	Gautam Gambhir
4 Wins	15 May 2018	27 March 2019	Dinesh Karthik
3 Wins	22 May 2016	15 April 2017	Gautam Gambhir
3 Wins	19 April 2026	20 May 2026	**Ajinkya Rahane**
Last updated: 24 May 2026

=== Most wins in a season ===
Wins	Season	Captain	Rank
12 Wins	2012	Gautam Gambhir	**Champions**
11 Wins	2014	Gautam Gambhir	**Champions**
11 Wins	2024	Shreyas Iyer	**Champions**
9 Wins	2017	Gautam Gambhir	3rd place
9 Wins	2018	Dinesh Karthik	3rd place
9 Wins	2021	Eoin Morgan	Runner-up
Last updated: 26 May 2024

=== Most consecutive defeats ===
Losses	Start date	End date	Captain
9 losses	23 April 2009	16 May 2009	Brendon McCullum
6 losses	9 April 2019	25 April 2019	Dinesh Karthik
5 losses	10 April 2022	28 April 2022	Shreyas Iyer
5 losses	29 March 2026	17 April 2026	**Ajinkya Rahane**
4 losses	26 April 2008	3 May 2008	Sourav Ganguly
4 losses	22 May 2011	8 April 2012	Gautam Gambhir
4 losses	26 April 2014	5 May 2014	Gautam Gambhir
4 losses	13 April 2021	24 April 2021	Eoin Morgan
4 losses	14 April 2023	23 April 2023	Nitish Rana
Last updated: 17 April 2026

=== Most consecutive defeats at home ===
Wins	Start date	End date	Captain
4 losses	12 April 2019	25 April 2019	Dinesh Karthik
3 losses	14 April 2023	29 April 2023	Nitish Rana
2 losses	18 May 2008	20 May 2008	Sourav Ganguly
2 losses	20 April 2011	22 April 2011	Gautam Gambhir
2 losses	22 May 2011	5 April 2012	Gautam Gambhir
2 losses	12 May 2012	14 May 2012	Gautam Gambhir
2 losses	20 April 2013	24 April 2013	Gautam Gambhir
2 losses	11 May 2023	20 May 2023	Nitish Rana
2 losses	8 April 2025	21 April 2025	**Ajinkya Rahane**
2 losses	2 April 2026	9 April 2026	**Ajinkya Rahane**
Last updated: 9 April 2026

=== Most losses in a season ===
Losses	Season	Captain	Rank
10 Losses	2009	Brendon McCullum	8th place
10 Losses	2013	Gautam Gambhir	7th place
8 Losses	2019	Dinesh Karthik	5th place
8 Losses	2021	Eoin Morgan	Runner-up
8 Losses	2022	Shreyas Iyer	7th place
8 Losses	2023	Nitish Rana	7th place
Last updated: 20 May 2023

=== Most wins against a single opponent ===
Wins	Opponent	Home	Away	Neutral (Note: The neutral matches include the matches of 2009 edition, initial stage of 2014 edition, 2020 edition, 2021 edition, 2022 edition and the playoffs matches of a season which is not played respectively.)
21 wins	Punjab Kings	9	7	5
21 wins	Sunrisers Hyderabad	8	5	8
20 wins	Royal Challengers Bengaluru	9	8	3
20 wins	Delhi Capitals / Delhi Daredevils	8	8	4
17 wins	Rajasthan Royals	8	4	5
Last updated: 8 May 2026

=== Most losses against a single opponent ===
Losses	Opponent	Home	Away	Neutral
26 losses	Mumbai Indians	7	13	6
22 losses	Chennai Super Kings	7	10	5
16 losses	Royal Challengers Bengaluru	5	5	6
16 losses	Delhi Capitals / Delhi Daredevils	2	6	7
14 losses	Rajasthan Royals	4	5	5
Last updated: 24 May 2026

=== Longest winning streak against a single opponent ===
Wins	Start date	End date	Opponent
8 Wins	11 May 2014	13 April 2017	Punjab Kings
5 Wins	12 March 2010	22 April 2012	Deccan Chargers
5 Wins	23 April 2017	5 April 2019	Royal Challengers Bengaluru
5 Wins	4 May 2023	3 April 2025	Sunrisers Hyderabad
4 Wins	19 May 2011	9 May 2013	Pune Warriors India
4 Wins	18 April 2018	7 April 2019	Rajasthan Royals
4 Wins	12 May 2018	10 October 2020	Punjab Kings
4 Wins	26 September 2020	3 October 2021	Sunrisers Hyderabad
4 Wins	6 April 2023	21 April 2024	Royal Challengers Bengaluru
4 Wins	3 April 2024	8 May 2026	Delhi Capitals
Last updated: 24 May 2026

=== Longest losing streak against a single opponent ===
Losses	Start date	End date	Opponent
8 losses	14 May 2015	9 May 2018	Mumbai Indians
5 losses	29 April 2008	22 March 2010	Mumbai Indians
4 losses	27 April 2018	3 October 2020	Delhi Capitals
4 losses	5 May 2019	13 April 2021	Mumbai Indians
4 losses	19 April 2019	18 April 2021	Royal Challengers Bengaluru
Last updated: 25 May 2025

=== Current winning streak against a single opponent ===
Wins	Start date	End date	Opponent
3 Wins	26 March 2025	Present	Rajasthan Royals
Last updated: 24 May 2026

=== Current losing streak against a single opponent ===
Wins	Start date	End date	Opponent
2 losses	26 April 2024	Present	Punjab Kings
2 losses	22 March 2025	Present	Royal Challengers Bengaluru
2 losses	7 May 2025	Present	Chennai Super Kings
Last updated: 13 May 2026

== Result records ==
=== Largest wins (by runs) ===
Margin	Opponent	Venue	Date
140 runs	Royal Challengers Bengaluru	M. Chinnaswamy Stadium, Bengaluru, India	18 April 2008
106 runs	Delhi Capitals	ACA-VDCA Cricket Stadium, Visakhapatnam, India	3 April 2024
98 runs	Lucknow Super Giants	Ekana Cricket Stadium, Lucknow, India	5 May 2024
86 runs	Rajasthan Royals	Sharjah Cricket Stadium, Sharjah, United Arab Emirates	7 October 2021
82 runs	Royal Challengers Bengaluru	Eden Gardens, Kolkata, India	23 April 2017
Last updated: 25 May 2025

=== Largest wins (by balls remaining) ===
Margin	Opponent	Venue	Date
60 balls	Royal Challengers Bengaluru	Sheikh Zayed Cricket Stadium, Abu Dhabi, United Arab Emirates	20 September 2021
59 balls	Chennai Super Kings	M.A. Chidambaram Stadium, Chennai, India	11 April 2025
57 balls	Sunrisers Hyderabad	M. A. Chidambaram Stadium, Chennai, India	26 May 2024
38 balls	Sunrisers Hyderabad	Narendra Modi Stadium, Ahmedabad, India	21 May 2024
37 balls	Rajasthan Royals	Sawai Mansingh Stadium, Jaipur, India	April 7, 2019
37 balls	Rajasthan Royals	Eden Gardens, Kolkata, India	April 17, 2011
Last updated: 25 May 2025

=== Largest wins (by wickets) ===
Margin	Opponent	Venue	Date
10 wickets	Gujarat Lions	Saurashtra Cricket Association Stadium, Rajkot, India	7 April 2017
9 wickets	Mumbai Indians	Eden Gardens, Kolkata, India	April 19, 2010
9 wickets	Rajasthan Royals	Sawai Mansingh Stadium, Jaipur, India	April 15, 2011
9 wickets	Punjab Kings	Barabati Stadium, Cuttack, India	May 11, 2014
9 wickets	Delhi Capitals	Eden Gardens, Kolkata, India	April 10, 2016
9 wickets	Royal Challengers Bengaluru	Sheikh Zayed Cricket Stadium, Abu Dhabi, United Arab Emirates	September 20, 2021
Last updated: 25 May 2024

=== Narrowest wins (by runs) ===
Margin	Opponent	Venue	Date
1 run	Royal Challengers Bengaluru	Eden Gardens, Kolkata, India	April 21, 2024
1 run	Rajasthan Royals	Eden Gardens, Kolkata, India	May 4, 2025
2 runs	Royal Challengers Bengaluru	Sharjah Cricket Stadium, Sharjah, United Arab Emirates	April 24, 2014
2 runs	Punjab Kings	Sheikh Zayed Stadium, Abu Dhabi, United Arab Emirates	October 10, 2020
4 runs	Sunrisers Hyderabad	Eden Gardens, Kolkata, India	March 23, 2024
Last updated: 25 May 2025

=== Narrowest wins (by balls remaining) ===
Margin	Opponent	Venue	Date
0 balls	Chennai Super Kings	Centurion Park, Centurion, South Africa	18 May 2009
0 balls	Gujarat Titans	Narendra Modi Stadium, Ahmedabad, India	9 April 2023
0 balls	Punjab Kings	Eden Gardens, Kolkata, India	8 May 2023
1 ball	Chennai Super Kings	Eden Gardens, Kolkata, India	30 April 2015
1 ball	Punjab Kings	Eden Gardens, Kolkata, India	9 May 2015
1 ball	Delhi Capitals	Arun Jaitley Stadium, Delhi, India	17 April 2017
1 ball	Delhi Capitals	Sharjah Cricket Stadium, Sharjah, India	13 October 2021
Last updated: 25 May 2025

=== Narrowest wins (by wickets) ===
Margin	Opponent	Venue	Date
1 wicket	Punjab Kings	Eden Gardens, Kolkata, India	9 May 2015
2 wickets	Rising Pune Supergiant	Maharashtra Cricket Association Stadium, Pune, India	24 April 2016
3 wickets	Punjab Kings	Eden Gardens, Kolkata, India	25 May 2008
3 wickets	Punjab Kings	M. Chinnaswamy Stadium, Bengaluru, India	1 June 2014
3 wickets	Delhi Capitals	Sharjah Cricket Stadium, Sharjah, United Arab Emirates	28 September 2021
3 wickets	Delhi Capitals	Sharjah Cricket Stadium, Sharjah, United Arab Emirates	13 October 2021
3 wickets	Gujarat Titans	Narendra Modi Stadium, Ahmedabad, India	9 April 2023
Last updated: 25 May 2025

=== Tied matches ===
Opponent	Venue	Date	Winners
Rajasthan Royals	Newlands Cricket Ground, Cape Town, South Africa	23 April 2009	Rajasthan Royals
Rajasthan Royals	Sheikh Zayed Cricket Stadium, Abu Dhabi, United Arab Emirates	29 April 2014	Rajasthan Royals
Delhi Capitals	Arun Jaitley Stadium, Delhi, India	30 March 2019	Delhi Capitals
Sunrisers Hyderabad	Sheikh Zayed Cricket Stadium, Abu Dhabi, United Arab Emirates	18 October 2020	Kolkata Knight Riders
Lucknow Super Giants	Ekana Cricket Stadium, Lucknow, India	26 April 2026	Kolkata Knight Riders
Last updated: 26 April 2026

=== Largest defeats (by runs) ===
Margin	Opponent	Venue	Date
110 runs	Sunrisers Hyderabad	Arun Jaitley Stadium, New Delhi, India	May 25, 2025
102 runs	Mumbai Indians	Eden Gardens, Kolkata, India	May 9, 2018
92 runs	Mumbai Indians	St George's Park Cricket Ground, Port Elizabeth, South Africa	April 27, 2009
82 runs	Royal Challengers Bengaluru	Sharjah Cricket Stadium, Sharjah, United Arab Emirates	October 12, 2020
75 runs	Lucknow Super Giants	Maharashtra Cricket Association Stadium, Pune, United Arab Emirates	7 May 2022
Last updated: 25 May 2025

=== Largest defeats (by balls remaining) ===
Margin	Opponent	Venue	Date
87 balls	Mumbai Indians	Wankhede Stadium, Mumbai, India	16 May 2008
43 balls	Mumbai Indians	Wankhede Stadium, Mumbai, India	31 March 2025
41 balls	Deccan Chargers	Newlands, Cape Town, South Africa	19 April 2009
41 balls	Rajasthan Royals	Eden Gardens, Kolkata, India	11 May 2023
39 balls	Chennai Super Kings	M. A. Chidambaram Stadium, Chennai, India	13 April 2010
39 balls	Gujarat Lions	Green Park Stadium, Kanpur, India	19 May 2016
39 balls	Royal Challengers Bengaluru	Sheikh Zayed Stadium, Abu Dhabi, United Arab Emirates	21 October 2020
Last updated: 31 March 2025

=== Largest defeats (by wickets) ===
Margin	Opponent	Venue	Date
9 wickets	Chennai Super Kings	M. A. Chidambaram Stadium, Chennai, India	13 April 2010
9 wickets	Sunrisers Hyderabad	Rajiv Gandhi International Cricket Stadium, Hyderabad, India	21 April 2019
9 wickets	Mumbai Indians	Wankhede Stadium, Mumbai, India	5 May 2019
9 wickets	Chennai Super Kings	M. A. Chidambaram Stadium, Chennai, India	26 April 2008
9 wickets	Royal Challengers Bengaluru	Eden Gardens, Kolkata, India	22 April 2011
9 wickets	Punjab Kings	Eden Gardens, Kolkata, India	21 April 2018
9 wickets	Royal Challengers Bengaluru	Eden Gardens, Kolkata, India	16 May 2016
9 wickets	Delhi Capitals	Kingsmead, Durban, South Africa	5 May 2009
Last updated: 5 May 2019

=== Narrowest defeats (by runs) ===
Margin	Opponent	Venue	Date
1 run	Lucknow Super Giants	Eden Gardens, Kolkata, India	20 May 2023
2 runs	Chennai Super Kings	M. A. Chidambaram Stadium, Chennai, India	April 8, 2011
2 runs	Punjab Kings	Eden Gardens, Kolkata, India	April 15, 2012
2 runs	Chennai Super Kings	M. A. Chidambaram Stadium, Chennai, India	April 28, 2015
2 runs	Lucknow Super Giants	DY Patil Stadium, Mumbai, India	18 May 2022
Last updated: 20 May 2023

=== Narrowest defeats (by balls remaining) ===
Margin	Opponent	Venue	Date
0 balls	Punjab Kings	St George's Park Cricket Ground, Port Elizabeth, South Africa	May 3, 2009
0 balls	Deccan Chargers	Wanderers Stadium, Johannesburg, South Africa	May 16, 2009
0 balls	Mumbai Indians	Eden Gardens, Kolkata, India	May 22, 2011
0 balls	Chennai Super Kings	Eden Gardens, Kolkata, India	May 14, 2012
0 balls	Chennai Super Kings	Dubai International Stadium, Dubai, United Arab Emirates	October 29, 2020
0 balls	Chennai Super Kings	Sheikh Zayed Cricket Stadium, Abu Dhabi, United Arab Emirates	September 26, 2021
0 balls	Rajasthan Royals	Eden Gardens, Kolkata, India	April 16, 2024
0 balls	Lucknow Super Giants	Eden Gardens, Kolkata, India	April 9, 2026
Last updated: 9 April 2026

=== Narrowest defeats (by wickets) ===
Margin	Opposition	Venue	Date
2 wickets	Chennai Super Kings	Sheikh Zayed Cricket Stadium, Abu Dhabi, United Arab Emirates	26 September 2021
2 wickets	Rajasthan Royals	Eden Gardens, Kolkata, India	16 April 2024
3 wickets	Royal Challengers Bengaluru	Eden Gardens, Kolkata, India	11 April 2015
3 wickets	Rajasthan Royals	Eden Gardens, Kolkata, India	25 April 2019
3 wickets	Royal Challengers Bengaluru	DY Patil Stadium, Navi Mumbai, India	30 March 2022
3 wickets	Lucknow Super Giants	Eden Gardens, Kolkata, India	9 April 2026
Last Updated: 9 April 2026

== Team records ==
=== Highest totals ===
Score	Opponent	Venue	Date
272/7	Delhi Capitals	ACA-VDCA Cricket Stadium, Visakhapatnam, India	3 April 2024
261/6	Punjab Kings	Eden Gardens, Kolkata, India	26 April 2024
247/2	Gujarat Titans	Eden Gardens, Kolkata, India	16 May 2026
245/6	Punjab Kings	Holkar Stadium, Indore, India	12 May 2018
235/6	Lucknow Super Giants	Ekana Cricket Stadium, Lucknow, India	5 May 2024
Last updated: 16 May 2026

=== Lowest totals ===
Score	Opponent	Venue	Date
67/10	Mumbai Indians	Wankhede Stadium, Mumbai, India	16 May 2008
84/8	Royal Challengers Bengaluru	Sheikh Zayed Stadium, Abu Dhabi, United Arab Emirates	21 October 2020
95/10	Mumbai Indians	St George's Park Cricket Ground, Port Elizabeth, South Africa	April 27, 2009
95/10	Punjab Kings	Maharaja Yadavindra Singh International Cricket Stadium, Punjab, India	April 15, 2025
101/10	Deccan Chargers	Newlands, Cape Town, South Africa	April 19, 2009
Last updated: 25 May 2025

=== Highest totals conceded ===
Score	Opponent	Venue	Date
278/3	Sunrisers Hyderabad	Arun Jaitley Stadium, New Delhi, India	25 May 2025
262/2	Punjab Kings	Eden Gardens, Kolkata, India	26 April 2024
238/3	Lucknow Super Giants	Eden Gardens, Kolkata, India	8 April 2025
235/4	Chennai Super Kings	Eden Gardens, Kolkata, India	23 April 2023
228/4	Sunrisers Hyderabad	Eden Gardens, Kolkata, India	14 April 2023
228/4	Delhi Capitals	Sharjah Cricket Stadium, Sharjah, United Arab Emirates	3 October 2020
Last updated: 25 May 2025

=== Lowest totals conceded ===
Score	Opponent	Venue	Date
49	Royal Challengers Bengaluru	Eden Gardens, Kolkata, India	23 April 2017
81	Rajasthan Royals	Eden Gardens, Kolkata, India	17 April 2011
82	Royal Challengers Bengaluru	M. Chinnaswamy Stadium, Bengaluru, India	18 April 2008
85	Rajasthan Royals	Sharjah Cricket Stadium, Sharjah, United Arab Emirates	7 October 2021
92	Royal Challengers Bengaluru	Sheikh Zayed Stadium, Abu Dhabi, United Arab Emirates	20 September 2021
Last updated: 25 May 2025

=== Highest match aggregates ===
Aggregate	KKR score	Opponent score	Opponent	Venue	Date
523/8	261/6	262/2	Punjab Kings	Eden Gardens, Kolkata, India	26 April 2024
472/10	234/7	238/3	Lucknow Super Giants	Eden Gardens, Kolkata, India	8 April 2025
465/6	247/2	218/4	Gujarat Titans	Eden Gardens, Kolkata, India	16 May 2026
459/14	245/6	214/8	Punjab Kings	Holkar Stadium, Indore, India	12 May 2018
447/14	223/6	224/8	Rajasthan Royals	Eden Gardens, Kolkata, India	16 April 2024
Last updated: 16 May 2026

=== Lowest match aggregates ===
Aggregate	KKR score	Opponent score	Opponent	Venue	Date
135/12	67/10	68/2	Mumbai Indians	Wankhede Stadium, Mumbai, India	16 May 2008
166/12	85/2	81/10	Rajasthan Royals	Eden Gardens, Kolkata, India	17 April 2011
169/10	84/8	85/2	Royal Challengers Bengaluru	Sheikh Zayed Stadium, Abu Dhabi, United Arab Emirates	21 October 2020
169/8	66/2	103/6	Rising Pune Supergiant	Eden Gardens, Kolkata, India	14 May 2016
175/6	61/2	114/4	Chennai Super Kings	Eden Gardens, Kolkata, India	7 May 2011
Last updated: 25 May 2025

== Batting records ==
=== Most runs ===
Runs	Player	Matches	Innings	Period
3,035	Gautam Gambhir	108	108	2011–2017
2,593	Andre Russell	133	111	2014–2025
2,439	Robin Uthappa	86	84	2014–2019
2,199	Nitish Rana	90	86	2018–2024
1,893	Yusuf Pathan	106	91	2011–2017
Last updated: 25 May 2025

=== Most runs in each batting position ===
Batting position	Batter	Innings	Runs	Period	Ref.
1–2	Gautam Gambhir	87	2,611	2011–2017	
3	Robin Uthappa	32	1,003	2017–2019	
4	Nitish Rana	37	869	2018–2023	
5	Yusuf Pathan	41	837	2011–2017	
6	Andre Russell	37	744	2015–2025	
7	Andre Russell	30	859	2015–2025	
8	Pat Cummins	13	163	2015–2022	
9	Brett Lee	7	66	2011–2013	
10	Umesh Yadav	11	75	2014–2023	
11	**Varun Chakravarthy**	9	15	2020-	
Last updated: 19 May 2026

=== Highest scores ===
Runs	Player	Opposition	Venue	Date
158*	Brendon McCullum	Royal Challengers Bengaluru	M. Chinnaswamy Stadium, Bangalore, India	18 April 2008
109	**Sunil Narine**	Rajasthan Royals	Eden Gardens, Kolkata, India	16 April 2024
104	Venkatesh Iyer	Mumbai Indians	Wankhede Stadium, Mumbai, India	16 April 2023
100*	**Finn Allen**	Delhi Capitals	Arun Jaitley Stadium, New Delhi, India	8 May 2026
97*	Dinesh Karthik	Rajasthan Royals	Eden Gardens, Kolkata, India	April 25, 2019
97*	Quinton de Kock	Rajasthan Royals	Sawai Mansingh Stadium, Jaipur, India	March 26, 2025
Last Updated: 8 May 2026

=== Highest career averages ===
Average	Player	Innings	Not out	Runs	Period
39.54	Phil Salt	12	1	435	2024-2024
36.55	**Finn Allen**	10	1	329	2026-
35.55	**Cameron Green**	13	4	320	2026-
34.85	**Rinku Singh**	61	21	1,394	2018-
34.43	Chris Lynn	40	3	1,274	2014–2019
Qualification: 10 innings. Last Updated: 20 May 2026

=== Highest strike rates ===
Strike rate	Player	Runs	BF	Period
174.96	Andre Russell	2,593	1,482	2014–2025
165.30	**Sunil Narine**	1,820	1,101	2012–
146.12	**Rinku Singh**	1,394	954	2018–
145.55	**Angkrish Raghuvanshi**	885	608	2024–
141.39	Chris Lynn	1,274	901	2014–2019
Qualification= 500 balls faced. Last Updated: 20 May 2026

=== Most half-centuries ===
Half-centuries	Player	Innings	Runs	Period
27	Gautam Gambhir	108	3,035	2011–2017
16	Robin Uthappa	84	2,439	2014–2019
14	Nitish Rana	86	2,199	2018–2024
13	Venkatesh Iyer	56	1,468	2021–2025
12	Andre Russell	111	2,593	2014–2025
Last Updated: 25 May 2025

=== Fastest half-centuries ===
Balls	Player	Opponent	Venue	Date
14	Pat Cummins	Mumbai Indians	Maharashtra Cricket Association Stadium, Pune, India	6 April 2022
15	**Sunil Narine**	Royal Challengers Bengaluru	M. Chinnaswamy Stadium, Bengaluru, India	7 May 2017
15	Yusuf Pathan	Sunrisers Hyderabad	Eden Gardens, Kolkata, India	24 May 2014
17	**Sunil Narine**	Royal Challengers Bengaluru	Eden Gardens, Kolkata, India	8 April 2018
19	Andre Russell	Punjab Kings	Eden Gardens, Kolkata, India	9 May 2015
19	Chris Lynn	Gujarat Lions	Saurashtra Cricket Association Stadium, Rajkot, India	7 April 2017
19	Jason Roy	Chennai Super Kings	Eden Gardens, Kolkata, India	23 April 2023
Last Updated: 23 April 2023

=== Most centuries ===
Centuries	Player	Innings	Runs	Period
1
1	**Finn Allen**	9	321	2026-
1	Brendon McCullum	35	882	2008–2013
1	Venkatesh Iyer	56	1,468	2021–2025
1	**Sunil Narine**	126	1,820	2012-
Last Updated: 16 May 2026

=== List of centuries ===
Score	Player	Opponent	Venue	Date
158*	Brendon McCullum	Royal Challengers Bengaluru	M. Chinnaswamy Stadium, Bengaluru, India	18 April 2008
104	Venkatesh Iyer	Mumbai Indians	Wankhede Stadium, Mumbai, India	16 April 2023
109	**Sunil Narine**	Rajasthan Royals	Eden Gardens, Kolkata, India	16 April 2024
100*	**Finn Allen**	Delhi Capitals	Arun Jaitley Stadium, New Delhi, India	8 May 2026
Last Updated: 8 May 2026

=== Most sixes ===
Sixes	Player	Innings	Period
220	Andre Russell	111	2014–2025
120	**Sunil Narine**	126	2012-
107	Nitish Rana	86	2018–2024
85	Robin Uthappa	84	2014–2019
85	Yusuf Pathan	91	2011–2017
Last Updated: 26 April 2026

=== Most fours ===
Fours	Player	Innings	Period
352	Gautam Gambhir	108	2011–2017
255	Robin Uthappa	84	2014–2019
203	Nitish Rana	86	2018–2024
191	**Sunil Narine**	126	2012-
183	Andre Russell	111	2014–2025
Last Updated: 26 April 2026

=== Highest strike rates in an innings ===
Strike rate	Player	Runs	Balls Faced	Opposition	Venue	Date
416.67	**Ramandeep Singh**	25*	6	Lucknow Super Giants	Ekana Cricket Stadium, Lucknow, India	5 May 2024
373.33	Pat Cummins	56*	15	Mumbai Indians	Maharashtra Cricket Association Stadium, Pune, India	6 April 2022
369.23	Andre Russell	48*	13	Royal Challengers Bangalore	M. Chinnaswamy Stadium, Bangalore, India	5 April 2019
342.85	Phil Salt	48	14	Royal Challengers Bangalore	Eden Gardens, Kolkata, India	21 April 2024
341.66	Andre Russell	41	12	Delhi Capitals	Eden Gardens, Kolkata, India	16 April 2018
Qualification: Minimum 25 runs. Last Updated: 25 May 2025

=== Most sixes in an innings ===
Sixes	Player	Opposition	Venue	Date
13	Brendon McCullum	Royal Challengers Bangalore	M. Chinnaswamy Stadium, Bangalore, India	18 April 2008
11	Andre Russell	Chennai Super Kings	M. A. Chidambaram Stadium, Chennai, India	10 April 2018
10	**Finn Allen**	Delhi Capitals	Arun Jaitley Stadium, New Delhi, India	8 May 2026
10	**Finn Allen**	Gujarat Titans	Eden Gardens, Kolkata, India	16 May 2026
9	Andre Russell	Royal Challengers Bangalore	Eden Gardens, Kolkata, India	19 April 2019
9	Dinesh Karthik	Rajasthan Royals	Eden Gardens, Kolkata, India	25 April 2019
9	Venkatesh Iyer	Mumbai Indians	Wankhede Stadium, Mumbai, India	16 April 2023
Last Updated: 16 May 2026

=== Most fours in an innings ===
Fours	Player	Opposition	Venue	Date
14	Manvinder Bisla	Chennai Super Kings	M. A. Chidambaram Stadium, Chennai, India	28 April 2013
14	Phil Salt	Lucknow Super Giants	Eden Gardens, Kolkata, India	14 April 2024
13	Gautam Gambhir	Sunrisers Hyderabad	Rajiv Gandhi International Cricket Stadium, Hyderabad, India	16 April 2016
13	Nitish Rana	Delhi Capitals	Sheikh Zayed Stadium, Abu Dhabi, UAE	24 October 2020
13	**Sunil Narine**	Rajasthan Royals	Eden Gardens, Kolkata, India	16 April 2024
Last Updated: 3 February 2026

=== Most ducks ===
Ducks	Player	Innings	Period
18	**Sunil Narine**	126	2012-
10	Gautam Gambhir	108	2011–2017
7	Nitish Rana	86	2018–2024
7	Yusuf Pathan	91	2011–2017
6	Andre Russell	111	2014–2025
Last Updated: 26 April 2026

=== Most runs in a season ===
Runs	Player	Matches	Innings	Season
660	Robin Uthappa	16	16	2014
590	Gautam Gambhir	17	17	2012
510	Andre Russell	14	13	2019
501	Gautam Gambhir	15	15	2016
498	Gautam Gambhir	16	16	2017
498	Dinesh Karthik	16	16	2018
Last Updated: 3 February 2026

=== Most sixes in a season ===
Sixes	Player	Matches	Innings	Season
52	Andre Russell	14	13	2019
33	**Sunil Narine**	15	14	2024
32	Andre Russell	14	12	2022
31	Andre Russell	16	14	2018
29	**Rinku Singh**	14	14	2023
Last Updated: 26 May 2024

=== Most fours in a season ===
Fours	Player	Matches	Innings	Season
74	Robin Uthappa	16	16	2014
64	Gautam Gambhir	17	17	2012
61	Gautam Gambhir	16	16	2017
58	Sourav Ganguly	14	14	2010
56	Chris Lynn	16	15	2018
Last Updated: 25 May 2018

=== Highest run-getter in each season ===
Year	Player	Innings	Runs
2008	Sourav Ganguly	13	349
2009	Brad Hodge	12	365
2010	Sourav Ganguly	14	493
2011	Jacques Kallis	14	424
2012	Gautam Gambhir	17	590
2013	Gautam Gambhir	16	406
2014	Robin Uthappa	16	660
2015	Robin Uthappa	13	364
2016	Gautam Gambhir	15	501
2017	Gautam Gambhir	16	498
2018	Dinesh Karthik	16	498
2019	Andre Russell	13	510
2020	Shubman Gill	14	440
2021	Shubman Gill	17	478
2022	Shreyas Iyer	14	401
2023	**Rinku Singh**	14	474
2024	**Sunil Narine**	14	488
2025	**Ajinkya Rahane**	12	390
2026	**Angkrish Raghuvanshi**	12	422
Last Updated: 24 May 2026

== Bowling records ==
=== Most wickets ===
Wickets	Player	Matches	Innings	Period
207	**Sunil Narine**	202	200	2012-
122	Andre Russell	133	114	2014–2025
109	**Varun Chakravarthy**	93	92	2020-
66	Piyush Chawla	70	69	2014–2019
65	Umesh Yadav	67	67	2014–2023
Last Updated: 20 May 2026

=== Best figures in an innings ===
Figures	Player	Opposition	Venue	Date
5/15	Andre Russell	Mumbai Indians	M. A. Chidambaram Stadium, Chennai, India	12 April 2021
5/19	**Sunil Narine**	Punjab Kings	Eden Gardens, Kolkata, India	15 April 2012
5/20	**Varun Chakravarthy**	Delhi Capitals	Sheikh Zayed Stadium, Abu Dhabi, UAE	24 October 2020
4/5	Andre Russell	Gujarat Titans	DY Patil Stadium, Navi Mumbai, India	23 April 2022
4/11	Shoaib Akhtar	Delhi Capitals	Eden Gardens, Kolkata, India	13 May 2008
Last Updated: 3 February 2026

=== Best career averages ===
Average	Player	Wickets	Runs	Balls	Period
21.59	Andre Russell	122	2,634	1,668	2014–2025
22.70	Chris Woakes	17	386	264	2017-2017
23.63	Tim Southee	19	449	318	2021–2023
24.07	Iqbal Abdulla	28	674	614	2008–2013
24.54	**Varun Chakravarthy**	109	2,675	2,092	2020-
Qualification: 250 balls. Last Updated: 20 May 2026

=== Best career economy rates ===
Economy rate	Player	Wickets	Runs	Balls	Period
6.58	Iqbal Abdulla	28	674	614	2008–2013
6.62	Murali Kartik	16	581	526	2008–2010
6.77	**Sunil Narine**	206	5,223	4,627	2012-
7.02	Ashok Dinda	22	605	517	2008–2010
7.17	Shakib Al Hasan	47	1,288	1,077	2011–2021
Qualification: 250 balls. Last Updated: 20 May 2026

=== Best economy rates in an innings ===
Economy	Player	Overs	Runs	Wickets	Opposition	Venue	Date
2.00	Mohammad Hafeez	4	8	1	Deccan Chargers	Eden Gardens, Kolkata, India	20 April 2008
2.00	Brett Lee	4	8	0	Chennai Super Kings	Eden Gardens, Kolkata, India	7 May 2011
2.25	John Hastings	2.4	6	2	Delhi Capitals	Eden Gardens, Kolkata, India	10 April 2016
2.33	Ishant Sharma	3	7	1	Royal Challengers Bangalore	M. Chinnaswamy Stadium, Bangalore, India	18 April 2008
2.33	Sourav Ganguly	3	7	1	Royal Challengers Bangalore	Eden Gardens, Kolkata, India	8 May 2008
2.33	Lakshmipathy Balaji	3	7	0	Mumbai Indians	Wankhede Stadium, Mumbai, India	7 May 2013
Qualification: 12 balls bowled. Last Updated: 11 April 2025

=== Best career strike rates ===
Strike rate	Player	Wickets	Runs	Balls	Period
13.67	Andre Russell	122	2,634	1,668	2014–2025
14.76	Mitchell Starc	17	444	251	2024-2024
15.52	Chris Woakes	17	386	264	2017-2017
15.66	**Kartik Tyagi**	16	443	282	2026-
16.22	**Harshit Rana**	40	1,029	649	2022-
Qualification: 250 balls | Last Updated: 20 May 2026

=== Best strike rates in an innings ===
Strike rate	Player	Balls	Runs	Wickets	Opposition	Venue	Date
1.50	Andre Russell	6	5	4	Gujarat Titans	DY Patil Stadium, Navi Mumbai, India	23 April 2022
1.60	Laxmi Ratan Shukla	5	6	3	Delhi Capitals	Eden Gardens, Kolkata, India	13 May 2008
2.40	Andre Russell	12	15	5	Mumbai Indians	M. A. Chidambaram Stadium, Chennai, India	12 April 2021
3.00	Yusuf Pathan	6	4	2	Rajasthan Royals	Sawai Mansingh Stadium, Jaipur, India	15 April 2011
3.00	Lakshmipathy Balaji	6	7	2	Pune Warriors India	Wankhede Stadium, Mumbai, India	19 May 2011
3.00	Nitish Rana	6	11	2	Royal Challengers Bangalore	Eden Gardens, Kolkata, India	8 April 2018
Qualification: Minimum 2 wickets. Last Updated: 23 April 2022.

=== Most four-wicket hauls and above in an innings ===
Four-wicket hauls	Player	Innings
8	**Sunil Narine**	2012-
3	Andre Russell	2014–2025
2	Umesh Yadav	2014–2023
2	**Varun Chakravarthy**	2020-
1	12 Players.	
Last Updated: 2 April 2026

=== Most five-wicket hauls and above in an innings ===
Five-wicket hauls	Player	Period
1	**Sunil Narine**	2012-
1	**Varun Chakravarthy**	2020-
1	Andre Russell	2014–2025
Last Updated: 13 April 2021

=== Most runs conceded in a match ===
Figures	Player	Overs	Opposition	Venue	Date
0/61	**Harshit Rana**	4	Punjab Kings	Eden Gardens, Kolkata, India	26 April 2024
2/60	Ryan McLaren	4	Mumbai Indians	Wankhede Stadium, Mumbai, India	7 May 2013
0/60	Anrich Nortje	4	Sunrisers Hyderabad	Arun Jaitley Stadium, Delhi, India	25 May 2025
1/59	Kuldeep Yadav	4	Royal Challengers Bangalore	Eden Gardens, Kolkata, India	19 April 2019
0/59	**Kartik Tyagi**	4	Gujarat Titans	Eden Gardens, Kolkata, India	16 May 2026
Last updated: 16 May 2026

=== Most wickets in a season ===
Wickets	Player	Innings	Season
24	**Sunil Narine**	15	2012
22	**Sunil Narine**	16	2013
21	**Sunil Narine**	16	2014
21	**Varun Chakravarthy**	14	2024
20	**Varun Chakravarthy**	14	2023
Last Updated: 26 May 2024

=== Hat-tricks ===
Bowler	Against	Wickets	Venue	Date	Ref.
**Sunil Narine**	Punjab Kings	David Hussey (c Manvinder Bisla); Azhar Mahmood (c and b); Gurkeerat Singh (b)	Punjab Cricket Association Stadium, Mohali	16 April 2013	
Last Updated: 16 April 2013

=== Highest wicket-taker in each season ===
Year	Player	Innings	Wickets
2008	Umar Gul	6	12
2009	Ishant Sharma	11	11
2010	Murali Kartik	10	9
2011	Iqbal Abdulla	15	16
2012	**Sunil Narine**	15	24
2013	**Sunil Narine**	16	22
2014	**Sunil Narine**	16	21
2015	Andre Russell	13	14
2016	Andre Russell	12	15
2017	Chris Woakes	13	17
2018	**Sunil Narine**	16	17
2019	Andre Russell	12	11
2020	**Varun Chakravarthy**	13	17
2021	**Varun Chakravarthy**	17	18
2022	Andre Russell	13	17
2023	**Varun Chakravarthy**	14	20
2024	**Varun Chakravarthy**	14	21
2025	**Varun Chakravarthy**	13	17
2026	**Kartik Tyagi**	13	18
Last Updated: 24 May 2026

== Wicket-keeping records ==
=== Most dismissals ===
Dismissals	Player	Matches	Innings	Period
49	Robin Uthappa	86	57	2014–2019
41	Dinesh Karthik	51	51	2018–2021
22	Manvinder Bisla	27	27	2011–2014
18	Brendon McCullum	35	18	2008–2013
17	Rahmanullah Gurbaz	19	17	2023–2025
Last updated: 25 May 2025

=== Most catches ===
Catches	Player	Matches	Innings	Period
35	Dinesh Karthik	61	61	2018–2021
27	Robin Uthappa	86	57	2014–2019
17	Rahmanullah Gurbaz	19	17	2023–2025
15	Manvinder Bisla	27	27	2011–2014
12	Brendon McCullum	35	18	2008–2013
12	Phil Salt	12	12	2024-2024
Last updated: 25 May 2025

=== Most stumpings ===
Stumpings	Player	Matches	Innings	Period
22	Robin Uthappa	86	57	2014–2019
7	Manvinder Bisla	27	27	2011–2014
6	Dinesh Karthik	61	61	2018–2021
6	Brendon McCullum	35	18	2008–2013
5	Wriddhiman Saha	33	26	2008–2010
Last updated: 15 October 2021

=== Most dismissals in an innings ===
Dismissals	Player	Opposition	Venue	Date
4	Morne van Wyk	Royal Challengers Bangalore	Kingsmead, Durban, South Africa	29 April 2009
4	Brendon McCullum	Delhi Daredevils	Maharashtra Cricket Association Stadium, Pune, India	22 May 2012
4	Dinesh Karthik	Rajasthan Royals	Eden Gardens, Kolkata, India	15 May 2018
4	Dinesh Karthik	Rajasthan Royals	Dubai International Stadium, Dubai, United Arab Emirates	1 November 2020
4	Sheldon Jackson	Royal Challengers Bangalore	DY Patil Stadium, Navi Mumbai, India	30 March 2022
4	Rahmanullah Gurbaz	Punjab Kings	Eden Gardens, Kolkata, India	8 May 2023
Last Updated: 8 May 2023

=== Most dismissals in a season ===
Dismissals	Player	Matches	Innings	Season
18	Dinesh Karthik	16	15	2018
15	Robin Uthappa	14	14	2017
14	Brendon McCullum	12	10	2012
14	Robin Uthappa	15	15	2016
12	Phil Salt	12	12	2024
12	Robin Uthappa	13	13	2015
Last Updated: 26 May 2024

== Fielding records ==
=== Most catches ===
Catches	Player	Matches	Innings	Period
47	**Rinku Singh**	72	70	2018-
40	Andre Russell	133	132	2014–2025
39	**Sunil Narine**	201	200	2012-
30	Manoj Tiwary	54	54	2010–2013
28	**Manish Pandey**	64	64	2014-
Last Updated: 20 May 2026

=== Most catches in an innings ===
Dismissals	Player	Opposition	Venue	Date
4	Jacques Kallis	Deccan Chargers	Eden Gardens, Kolkata, India	11 April 2011
4	**Rinku Singh**	Gujarat Titans	DY Patil Stadium, Navi Mumbai, India	23 April 2022
4	**Rinku Singh**	Lucknow Super Giants	Ekana Cricket Stadium, Lucknow, India	26 April 2026
3
3	Laxmi Ratan Shukla	Royal Challengers Bangalore	M. Chinnaswamy Stadium, Bangalore, India	10 April 2012
3	Manoj Tiwary	Sunrisers Hyderabad	Eden Gardens, Kolkata, India	10 April 2013
3	Manoj Tiwary	Pune Warriors India	Maharashtra Cricket Association Stadium, Pune, India	14 April 2013
3	**Manish Pandey**	Gujarat Lions	Eden Gardens, Kolkata, India	21 April 2017
3	**Manish Pandey**	Royal Challengers Bangalore	Eden Gardens, Kolkata, India	23 April 2017
3	**Rahul Tripathi**	Delhi Capitals	Sheikh Zayed Stadium, Abu Dhabi, UAE	24 October 2020
3	Eoin Morgan	Punjab Kings	Narendra Modi Stadium, Ahmedabad, India	26 April 2021
3	Tim Southee	Punjab Kings	Wankhede Stadium, Mumbai, India	1 April 2022
3	**Ramandeep Singh**	Punjab Kings	Maharaja Yadavindra Singh International Cricket Stadium, Mullanpur, India	15 April 2025
3	**Rinku Singh**	Chennai Super Kings	Eden Gardens, Kolkata, India	7 May 2025
Last Updated: 26 April 2026

=== Most catches in a season ===
Catches	Player	Matches	Innings	Edition
10	Manoj Tiwary	10	10	2012
10	**Rinku Singh**	14	13	2026
10	Shreyas Iyer	15	14	2024
10	Manoj Tiwary	16	16	2013
9
9	**Anukul Roy**	14	13	2026
9	**Rinku Singh**	13	13	2025
9	Jacques Kallis	15	15	2011
9	Eoin Morgan	17	17	2021
Last Updated: 24 May 2026

== Other records ==
=== Most matches ===
Matches	Player	Period
202	**Sunil Narine**	2012-
133	Andre Russell	2014–2025
108	Gautam Gambhir	2011–2017
106	Yusuf Pathan	2011–2017
94	**Varun Chakravarthy**	2020-
Last Updated: 24 May 2026

=== Most matches as captain ===
Matches	Player	Won	Lost	Tied	NR	Win %	Period
108	Gautam Gambhir	61	46	1	0	56.48	2011–2017
37	Dinesh Karthik	19	17	1	0	51.35	2018–2020
29	Shreyas Iyer	17	11	0	1	58.62	2022–2024
27	Sourav Ganguly	13	14	0	0	48.14	2008–2010
27	Ajinkya Rahane	10	14	1	2	37.04	2025–2026
Last Updated: 24 May 2026

=== Most wins as captain ===
Wins	Player	Period	GS	PO	Final
61	Gautam Gambhir	2011-2017	56	3	2
19	Dinesh Karthik	2018-2020	18	1	—N/a
17	Shreyas Iyer	2022-2024	15	1	1
13	Sourav Ganguly	2008-2010	13	—N/a	—N/a
12	Eoin Morgan	2020-2021	10	2	—N/a
Last Updated: 26 May 2024

== Partnership records ==
=== Highest partnerships by wicket ===
Wicket	Runs	First batsman	Second batsman	Opposition	Venue	Date
1st Wicket	184*	Gautam Gambhir	Chris Lynn	Gujarat Lions	Saurashtra Cricket Association Stadium, Rajkot, India	7 April 2017
2nd Wicket	158	Gautam Gambhir	Robin Uthappa	Rising Pune Supergiant	Maharashtra Cricket Association Stadium, Pune, India	26 April 2017
3rd Wicket	120*	Phil Salt	Shreyas Iyer	Lucknow Super Giants	Eden Gardens, Kolkata, India	14 April 2024
4th Wicket	121	Robin Uthappa	Shakib Al Hasan	Royal Challengers Bengaluru	Eden Gardens, Kolkata, India	22 May 2014
5th Wicket	134*	Yusuf Pathan	Shakib Al Hasan	Gujarat Lions	Eden Gardens, Kolkata, India	8 May 2016
6th Wicket	104	David Hussey	Wriddhiman Saha	Punjab Kings	Punjab Cricket Association Stadium, Mohali, India	3 May 2008
7th Wicket	81	Andre Russell	**Rinku Singh**	Sunrisers Hyderabad	Eden Gardens, Kolkata, India	23 March 2024
8th Wicket	62*	**Rinku Singh**	**Sunil Narine**	Lucknow Super Giants	Ekana Cricket Stadium, Lucknow, India	26 April 2026
9th Wicket	39	Lockie Ferguson	Shivam Mavi	Chennai Super Kings	Dubai International Cricket Stadium, Dubai, United Arab Emirates	15 October 2021
10th Wicket	31	Andre Russell	**Varun Chakravarthy**	Delhi Capitals	Arun Jaitley Stadium, New Delhi, India	20 April 2023
Last Updated: 26 April 2026

=== Highest partnerships by runs ===
Wicket	Runs	First batsman	Second batsman	Opposition	Venue	Date
1st wicket	184*	Gautam Gambhir	Chris Lynn	Gujarat Lions	Saurashtra Cricket Association Stadium, Rajkot, India	7 April 2017
2nd wicket	158	Gautam Gambhir	Robin Uthappa	Rising Pune Supergiant	Maharashtra Cricket Association Stadium, Pune, India	26 April 2017
2nd wicket	152*	Gautam Gambhir	Jacques Kallis	Rajasthan Royals	Sawai Mansingh Stadium, Jaipur, India	15 April 2011
1st wicket	138	Phil Salt	**Sunil Narine**	Punjab Kings	Eden Gardens, Kolkata, India	26 April 2024
2nd wicket	136	Jacques Kallis	Manvinder Bisla	Chennai Super Kings	M. A. Chidambaram Stadium, Chennai, India	27 May 2012
Last Updated: 26 April 2024
