= 2023 Kolkata Knight Riders season =

Indian Premier League cricket team season

Kolkata Knight Riders
2023 season
- Coach: Chandrakant Pandit
- Captain: Nitish Rana
- Ground(s): Eden Gardens, Kolkata
- 2023 Indian Premier League: 7th
- Most runs: Rinku Singh (474)
- Most wickets: Varun Chakravarthy (20)

The 2023 cricket season was the 16th season for the Indian Premier League (IPL) franchise Kolkata Knight Riders (KKR). The franchise had won the IPL title twice in 2012 and 2014 . The franchise had also qualified for the playoffs for three consecutive years in 2016, 2017 and 2018 as well as in 2021, when they were the runners up. In 2023, KKR failed to qualify for the playoffs for the second season in a row, finishing in the seventh place.

== Background ==
The team retained four players from the 2022 season ahead of the 2023 Auction

Retained
Shreyas Iyer, Andre Russell, Varun Chakravarthy, Venkatesh Iyer, Sunil Narine, Nitish Rana, Umesh Yadav, Tim Southee, Anukul Roy, Rinku Singh, Harshit Rana

Released
Pat Cummins, Shivam Mavi, Sam Billings, Aaron Finch, Alex Hales, Ajinkya Rahane, Mohammad Nabi, Sheldon Jackson, Ashok Sharma, Chamika Karunaratne, Abhijeet Tomar, Baba Indrajith, Pratham Singh, Ramesh Kumar, Rasikh Salam Dar

Trade
Shardul Thakur, Lockie Ferguson, Rahmanullah Gurbaz

== Squad ==
- Players with international caps are listed in **bold**
- Ages given as of 31 March 2023, the date of the first match of the season

No.	Name	Nationality	Birth date	Batting style	Bowling style	Year signed	Salary	Notes
Batters
	Aarya Desai	India	3 April 2003 (aged 19)	Left-handed	Right-arm off break	2023	₹20 lakh (US$21,000)	
1	**Mandeep Singh**	India	18 December 1991 (aged 31)	Right-handed	Right-arm medium	2023	₹50 lakh (US$52,000)	
27	**Nitish Rana**	India	27 December 1993 (aged 29)	Left-handed	Right-arm off break	2018	₹8 crore (US$840,000)	
41	**Shreyas Iyer**	India	6 December 1994 (aged 28)	Right-handed	Right-arm leg break	2022	₹12.25 crore (US$1.3 million)	Unavailable due to back injury
20	**Jason Roy**	England	21 July 1990 (aged 32)	Right-handed	Right-arm medium-fast	2023	₹2.8 crore (US$290,000)	Overseas Replacement of Shakib Al Hasan
35	Rinku Singh	India	12 October 1997 (aged 25)	Left-handed	Right-arm off break	2018	₹55 lakh (US$58,000)	
Wicket-keepers
16	**Litton Das**	Bangladesh	13 October 1994 (aged 28)	Right-handed		2023	₹50 lakh (US$52,000)	Overseas Unavailable due to personal reason
18	Narayan Jagadeesan	India	24 December 1995 (aged 27)	Right-handed		2023	₹90 lakh (US$94,000)	
21	**Rahmanullah Gurbaz**	Afghanistan	28 November 2001 (aged 21)	Right-handed		2023	₹50 lakh (US$52,000)	Overseas Unavailable due to personal reason
	**Johnson Charles**	West Indies	14 January 1989 (aged 34)	Right-handed	Left-arm orthodox	2023	₹50 lakh (US$52,000)	Overseas Replacement of Litton Das
All-rounders
96	**David Wiese**	Namibia	18 May 1985 (aged 37)	Right-handed	Right-arm fast-medium	2023	₹1 crore (US$100,000)	Overseas
75	**Shakib Al Hasan**	Bangladesh	24 April 1987 (aged 35)	Left-handed	Left-arm orthodox	2023	₹1.5 crore (US$160,000)	Overseas Unavailable due to personal reason
12	**Andre Russell**	West Indies	29 April 1988 (aged 34)	Right-handed	Right-arm fast	2014	₹12 crore (US$1.3 million)	Overseas
54	**Shardul Thakur**	India	16 October 1991 (aged 31)	Right-handed	Right-arm medium	2023	₹10.75 crore (US$1.1 million)	
25	**Venkatesh Iyer**	India	25 December 1994 (aged 28)	Left-handed	Right-arm medium	2021	₹8 crore (US$840,000)	
6	Anukul Roy	India	30 November 1998 (aged 24)	Left-handed	Left-arm orthodox	2022	₹20 lakh (US$21,000)	
Spin bowlers
74	**Sunil Narine**	West Indies	26 May 1988 (aged 34)	Left-handed	Right-arm off break	2012	₹6 crore (US$630,000)	Overseas Captain
29	**Varun Chakravarthy**	India	29 August 1991 (aged 31)	Right-handed	Right-arm leg spin	2020	₹8 crore (US$840,000)	
05	Suyash Sharma	India	15 May 2003 (aged 19)	Right-handed	Right-arm leg spin	2023	₹20 lakh (US$21,000)	
Pace bowlers
19	**Umesh Yadav**	India	25 October 1987 (aged 35)	Right-handed	Right-arm fast	2022	₹2 crore (US$210,000)	
38	**Tim Southee**	New Zealand	11 December 1988 (aged 34)	Right-handed	Right-arm medium-fast	2021	₹1.5 crore (US$160,000)	Overseas
69	**Lockie Ferguson**	New Zealand	13 June 1991 (aged 31)	Right-handed	Right-arm fast	2023	₹10 crore (US$1.0 million)	Overseas
136	Kulwant Khejroliya	India	13 March 1992 (aged 31)	Left-handed	Left-arm medium-fast	2023	₹20 lakh (US$21,000)	
14	Vaibhav Arora	India	14 December 1997 (aged 25)	Right-handed	Right-arm fast-medium	2023	₹60 lakh (US$63,000)	
22	Harshit Rana	India	22 December 2001 (aged 21)	Right-handed	Right-arm medium-fast	2023	₹20 lakh (US$21,000)	

- Source: Kolkata Knight Riders

== Administration and support staff ==
Position	Name
CEO and Managing Director	Venky Mysore
Team manager	Wayne Bentley
Head coach	Chandrakant Pandit
Assistant coach	Abhishek Nayar
Assistant coach	James Foster
Mentor	David Hussey
Bowling coach	Bharat Arun
Assistant bowling coach	Omkar Salvi
Fielding coach	Ryan ten Doeschate
Strength and conditioning coach	Chris Donaldson
Source:KKR Staff

== Points table ==
Pos	Grp	Team	Pld	W	L	NR	Pts	NRR	Qualification
1	B	Gujarat Titans (R)	14	10	4	0	20	0.809	Advanced to Qualifier 1
2	B	Chennai Super Kings (C)	14	8	5	1	17	0.652	Advanced to Qualifier 1
3	A	Lucknow Super Giants (4th)	14	8	5	1	17	0.284	Advanced to Eliminator
4	A	Mumbai Indians (3rd)	14	8	6	0	16	−0.044	Advanced to Eliminator
5	A	Rajasthan Royals	14	7	7	0	14	0.148	
6	B	Royal Challengers Bangalore	14	7	7	0	14	0.135	
7	A	Kolkata Knight Riders	14	6	8	0	12	−0.239	
8	B	Punjab Kings	14	6	8	0	12	−0.304	
9	A	Delhi Capitals	14	5	9	0	10	−0.808	
10	B	Sunrisers Hyderabad	14	4	10	0	8	−0.590	

Source: Indian Premier League

The four top-ranked teams will qualify for the Playoffs.
Advance to Qualifier 1
Advance to Eliminator

== Teams and standings ==
=== Results by match ===
Round	1	2	3	4	5	6	7	8	9	10	11	12	13	14
Teams	PBKS (A)	RCB (H)	GT (A)	SRH (H)	MI (A)	DC (A)	CSK (H)	RCB (A)	GT (H)	SRH (A)	PBKS (H)	RR (H)	CSK (A)	LSG (H)
Result	L	W	W	L	L	L	L	W	L	W	W	L	W	L

Source: Fixtures
W = Win; L = Loss; NR = No Result

== Statistics ==
=== Most runs ===
No.	Name	Matches	Runs	High score
1	Rinku Singh	12	407	58 not out
2	Nitish Rana	12	383	75
3	Venkatesh Iyer	11	314	104
4	Jason Roy	5	218	61
5	Andre Russell	11	208	42
6	Rahmanullah Gurbaz	8	198	81
7	Shardul Thakur	8	109	68
8	Narayan Jagadeesan	6	89	36
9	David Wiese	3	21	12 not out
10	Umesh Yadav	8	19	6 not out
11	Anukul Roy	3	17	13 not out
12	Mandeep Singh	3	14	12
13	Sunil Narine	11	14	7 not out
14	Litton Das	1	4	4
15	Vaibhav Arora	3	2	2 not out
16	Varun Chakravarthy	11	1	1

- Source: https://www.iplt20.com/stats/

=== Most wickets ===
No.	Name	Matches	Wickets	Best bowling
1	Varun Chakravarthy	11	17	4/15
2	Suyash Sharma	8	10	3/30
3	Sunil Narine	11	7	3/33
4	Andre Russell	11	7	3/22
5	Harshit Rana	3	4	2/33
6	Shardul Thakur	8	4	2/23
7	Anukul Roy	3	3	2/19
8	Nitish Rana	11	3	2/17
9	Vaibhav Arora	3	2	2/32
10	Tim Southee	2	2	2/54
11	Kulwant Khejroliya	2	2	2/44
12	Umesh Yadav	8	1	1/27
13	Lockie Ferguson	3	1	1/19

- Source: https://www.iplt20.com/stats/
