= 2012 Indian Premier League final =

- Event: 2012 Indian Premier League
Chennai Super Kings	Kolkata Knight Riders
190/3	192/5
(20 overs)	(19.4 overs)
- Kolkata Knight Riders won by 5 wickets
- Date: 27 May 2012
- Venue: M. A. Chidambaram Stadium, Chennai
- Player of the match: Manvinder Bisla (KKR)
- Umpires: Billy Bowden (NZ); Simon Taufel (Aus)
- Attendance: 48,955

The 2012 Indian Premier League final was a day/night Twenty20 cricket match on 27 May 2012 at the M. A. Chidambaram Stadium, Chennai, which was played between Chennai Super Kings and Kolkata Knight Riders to determine the winner of the 2012 season of the Indian Premier League, an annual Twenty20 cricket tournament in India.

Kolkata Knight Riders opted to bowl first as they won the toss and Chennai Super Kings set up a big total of 190/3 off 20 overs for them. Kolkata Knight Riders chased the total successfully with 2-balls to spare losing 5 wickets in the process and secured the 2012 Indian Premier League trophy, which happens to be their maiden title in the history of the tournament.

Manvinder Bisla of Kolkata Knight Riders was declared the "man of the match" in the Final, Sunil Narine of Kolkata Knight Riders was declared the most valuable player of the tournament and Mandeep Singh of Kings XI Punjab was declared as the emerging player of the season for the 2012 Indian Premier League.

== Road to the final ==
=== League stage ===
League progression
Team	Group matches																Playoffs		
Team	1	2	3	4	5	6	7	8	9	10	11	12	13	14	15	16	Q1/E	Q2	F
Chennai Super Kings	0	2	2	4	4	6	8	9	9	9	11	11	13	15	17	17	W	W	L
Kolkata Knight Riders	0	0	2	4	4	6	8	9	11	13	15	17	17	17	19	21	W		W

Win	Loss	No result

- Note: The total points at the end of each group match are listed.
- Note: Click on the points (group matches) or W/L (playoffs) to see the match summary.

==== League stage series ====
26 April (D/N)
Match 41
Scorecard

(H) Chennai Super Kings; 139/5 (20 overs)	v	Kolkata Knight Riders; 140/5 (19.2 overs)

Kolkata won by 5 wickets
M. A. Chidambaram Stadium, Chennai

11 May (D/N)
Match 63
Scorecard

(H) Kolkata Knight Riders; 158/6 (20 overs)	v	Chennai Super Kings; 160/5 (20 overs)

Chennai won by 5 wickets
Eden Gardens, Kolkata

=== Playoff stage ===
21 May (D/N)
Qualifier 1

Kolkata Knight Riders; 162/4 (20 overs)	v	Delhi Daredevils; 144/8 (20 overs)

Kolkata won by 18 runs
Maharashtra Cricket Association Stadium, Pune

== Match Summary ==
The final between the defending two-time champions Chennai Super Kings and the first-time finalists Kolkata Knight Riders was held at the M. A. Chidambaram Stadium, Chennai on 27 May 2012. While the Super Kings retained their team from the Qualifier, a hamstring injury to Knight Riders medium-pace bowler Lakshmipathy Balaji resulted the inclusion of Australian Brett Lee and this inclusion of another foreign player required the Knight Riders to leave out their former captain and wicket-keeper batsman Brendon McCullum of New Zealand to maintain the cap of 4 foreign players. Wicket-keeper batsman Manvinder Bisla was brought in to replace Brendon McCullum.

After Knight Riders captain Gautam Gambhir won the toss and elected to bowl first, openers Murali Vijay and Mike Hussey put on an opening partnership of 87 until Vijay was dismissed for 42 (from 32 balls) in the 11th over. Mike Hussey was joined by IPL's leading run scorer Suresh Raina and they scored at a brisk rate to reach 160 when Hussey was dismissed in the eighteenth over for 54 (from 43 balls). Suresh Raina who had scored an imposing 73 (from 38 balls) with five sixes was dismissed off the last ball as Chennai reached a formidable total of 190. In reply, the Knight Riders lost their captain Gautam Gambhir cheaply for 2 in the first over. However, they recovered as Manvinder Bisla (89 from 48 balls) and Jacques Kallis (69 from 49 balls) added 136 for the second wicket. Soon after Bisla's dismissal in the 15th over, the Knight Riders lost wickets at regular intervals and after Kallis was caught out by Ravindra Jadeja off the bowling of Ben Hilfenhaus at 18.5 overs, the Knight Riders required 16 runs from the last 7 balls. Shakib Al Hasan appeared to have been caught by Murali Vijay off the very next delivery from Hilfenhaus but it happened to be a no-ball and amid the celebrations, Shakib Al Hasan had completed two runs and retained the strike and hit a four the very next ball. Needing 9 runs to win from the last over, Manoj Tiwary hit consecutive fours to secure victory for the Knight Riders. Manvinder Bisla was declared Man of the Match for his 89 from 48 balls which included five sixes and eight fours.

== Scorecard ==
- On-field umpires: Billy Bowden (NZ), Simon Taufel (Aus)
- Third umpire: Billy Doctrove (WI)
- Reserve umpire: Krishnamachari Srinivasan (IND)
- Match referee: Ranjan Madugalle (SL)
- Toss: Chennai Super Kings voted to bat first
- Result: Kolkata Knight Riders won by five wickets
- League impact: Kolkata Knight Riders won at the 2012 Indian Premier League

Chennai Super Kings batting innings
Batsman	Method of dismissal	Runs	Balls	4s	6s	Strike rate
Mike Hussey	b Kallis	54	43	4	2	125.58
Murali Vijay	c Shakib Al Hasan b Bhatia	42	32	4	1	131.25
Suresh Raina	c Lee b Shakib Al Hasan	73	38	3	5	192.10
MS Dhoni *†	not out	14	9	2	0	155.55
Dwayne Bravo	did not bat	–	–	–	–	–
Ravindra Jadeja	did not bat	–	–	–	–	–
Albie Morkel	did not bat	–	–	–	–	–
Ravichandran Ashwin	did not bat	–	–	–	–	–
Ben Hilfenhaus	did not bat	–	–	–	–	–
Shadab Jakati	did not bat	–	–	–	–	–
Subramaniam Badrinath	did not bat	–	–	–	–	–
Extras	(lb 3, nb 2, wd 2)	7				
Total	(20 overs)	190/3	RR: 9.50			

Kolkata Knight Riders bowling
Bowler	Overs	Maidens	Runs	Wickets	Economy	0s	4s	6s	WD	NB
Brett Lee	4	0	42	0	10.50	9	3	3	0	1
Shakib Al Hasan	3	0	25	1	8.33	5	1	1	1	0
Sunil Narine	4	0	37	0	9.25	5	1	2	0	0
Iqbal Abdulla	1	0	9	0	9.00	2	1	0	0	0
Jacques Kallis	4	0	34	1	8.50	7	3	1	1	1
Rajat Bhatia	3	0	23	1	7.66	5	2	0	0	0
Yusuf Pathan	1	0	17	0	17.00	0	2	1	0	0

Kolkata Knight Riders batting innings
Batsman	Method of dismissal	Runs	Balls	4s	6s	Strike rate
Manvinder Bisla †	c Badrinath b Morkel	89	48	8	5	185.41
Gautam Gambhir *	b Hilfenhaus	2	4	0	0	50.00
Jacques Kallis	c Jadeja b Hilfenhaus	69	49	7	1	140.81
LR Shukla	c Hussey b Bravo	3	6	0	0	50.00
Yusuf Pathan	c Badrinath b Ashwin	1	2	0	0	50.00
Shakib Al Hasan	not out	11	7	1	0	157.14
Manoj Tiwary	not out	9	3	2	0	300.00
Rajat Bhatia	did not bat	–	–	–	–	–
Iqbal Abdulla	did not bat	–	–	–	–	–
Sunil Narine	did not bat	–	–	–	–	–
Brett Lee	did not bat	–	–	–	–	–
Extras	(lb 1, nb 1, wd 6)	8				
Totals	(19.4 overs)	192/5	RR: 9.76			

Chennai Super Kings bowling
Bowler	Overs	Maidens	Runs	Wickets	Economy	0s	4s	6s	WD	NB
Ben Hilfenhaus	4	0	25	2	6.25	11	2	0	1	1
Albie Morkel	4	0	38	1	9.50	5	5	0	2	0
Ravichandran Ashwin	4	0	41	1	10.25	6	1	3	0	0
Dwayne Bravo	3.4	0	49	1	13.36	3	4	3	2	0
Shadab Jakati	4	0	38	0	9.50	5	6	0	0	0

Source :

Full scorecard on ESPNcricinfo

Key

- * – Captain
- † – Wicket-keeper
- c Fielder – the batsman was dismissed by a catch by the named fielder
- b Bowler – the bowler who gains credit for the dismissal
- lbw – the batsman was dismissed leg before wicket
- Total runs are in the format: score/wickets
- b – Bye, lb – Leg bye, nb – No-ball, wd – Wide, RR – Run rate
