= Tejasvi Singh Dahiya =

Indian cricketer (born 2002)

Tejasvi Singh
Personal information
- Full name: Tejasvi Singh Dahiya
- Born: 18 April 2002 (age 24); Delhi, India
- Batting: Right-handed
- Role: Wicket-keeper-batsman

Domestic team information
- Years: Team
- 2024/25–present: Delhi
- 2026–present: Kolkata Knight Riders

Career statistics
Competition	FC	LA	T20
Matches	0	2	6
Runs scored	0	115	113
Batting average	0	57.50	56.50
100s/50s	0	1	0/1
Top score	0	114	53*
Catches/stumpings	0/–	1/–	1/–
- Source: ESPNcricinfo, 17 December 2025

Tejasvi Singh Dahiya (born 18 April 2002) is an Indian wicket-keeper-batter who plays for Delhi in domestic cricket and Kolkata Knight Riders in the Indian Premier League.

Singh gained wider recognition for his performance in the Delhi Premier League, where he was the tournament’s leading six-hitter, striking 29 sixes and scoring 339 runs at a strike rate of 190.44.

He was acquired by the Kolkata Knight Riders for ₹3 crore in the IPL 2026 auction on 16 December, having entered the auction with a base price of ₹30 lakh.
