= Sarthak Ranjan =

Indian cricketer (born 1996)

Personal information
- Born: 25 September 1996 (age 30); Delhi, India
- Batting: Right-handed
- Bowling: Legbreak

Domestic team information
- Years: Team
- 2016–present: Delhi
- 2026–present: Kolkata Knight Riders
- Source: Cricinfo, 10 January 2016

Sarthak Ranjan (born 25 September 1996) is an Indian cricketer who plays for Delhi in domestic cricket and the Kolkata Knight Riders in the Indian Premier League. He made his Twenty20 debut on 2 January 2016 in the 2015–16 Syed Mushtaq Ali Trophy. He made his List A debut for Delhi in the 2016–17 Vijay Hazare Trophy on 25 February 2017. He made his first-class debut for Delhi in the 2018–19 Ranji Trophy on 20 November 2018. His father is politician Pappu Yadav.

== IPL 2026 ==
Ahead of IPL 2026, Ranjan was acquired by Kolkata Knight Riders.
