= Saurabh Dubey (Maharashtra cricketer) =

Indian cricketer (born 1998)

Personal information
- Full name: Saurabh Rajendraprasad Dubey
- Born: 23 January 1998 (age 28); Wardha, Maharashtra, India
- Height: 6 ft 5 in (196 cm)
- Source: Cricinfo, 14 November 2019

Saurabh Dubey (born 23 January 1998) is an Indian cricketer who represents Vidarbha in domestic cricket and Kolkata Knight Riders in the Indian Premier League. In November 2019, he was named in India's squad for the 2019 ACC Emerging Teams Asia Cup in Bangladesh. He made his List A debut for India, against Nepal, in the Emerging Teams Cup on 14 November 2019. In February 2022, he was bought by the Sunrisers Hyderabad in the auction for the 2022 Indian Premier League tournament. Despite being part of the squad, he did not make an appearance in any matches and was subsequently released by the Sunrisers Hyderabad for the next season.
