= Dishant Yagnik =

Indian cricketer (born 1983)

Personal information
- Full name: Dishant Harendra Yagnik
- Born: 22 June 1983 (age 43); Banswara, Rajasthan, India
- Nickname: Yagi, Rinku
- Batting: Left-handed
- Role: Wicket-keeper

Domestic team information
- Years: Team
- 2002/03–2017: Rajasthan
- 2007–2009: Delhi Giants
- 2011–2014: Rajasthan Royals

Career statistics
Competition	FC	LA	T20
Matches	29	25	22
Runs scored	1307	584	491
Batting average	27.74	26.54	34.25
100s/50s	1/5	1/3	0/4
Top score	101	101	70
Catches/stumpings	82/3	20/3	8/5
- Source: ESPNcricinfo, 10 March 2013

Dishant Harendra Yagnik (born 22 June 1983) is a former Indian cricketer and coach. He was a wicket-keeper who represented Rajasthan in domestic cricket. He was also a member of Rajasthan Royals in Indian Premier League. He is currently the fielding coach of Kolkata Knight Riders.
