= Prashant Solanki =

Indian cricketer (born 2000)

Personal information
- Full name: Prashant Hitesh Solanki
- Born: 22 February 2000 (age 26)
- Batting: Right-handed
- Bowling: Right-arm Legbreak
- Role: Bowler

Domestic team information
- Years: Team
- 2020/21–2022/23: Mumbai
- 2022: Chennai Super Kings
- 2023/24–present: Maharashtra
- 2026: Kolkata Knight Riders
- Source: ESPNcricinfo, 25 February 2021

Prashant Hitesh Solanki (born 22 February 2000) is an Indian cricketer who plays for Maharashtra in domestic cricket and Kolkata Knight Riders in the Indian Premier League.

== Career ==
Solanki made his List A debut on 25 February 2021, for Mumbai in the 2020–21 Vijay Hazare Trophy, taking a five-wicket haul in the match. He made his Twenty20 debut on 9 November 2021, for Mumbai in the 2021–22 Syed Mushtaq Ali Trophy. In February 2022, he was bought by the Chennai Super Kings in the auction for the 2022 Indian Premier League tournament. He made his first-class debut on 24 February 2022, for Mumbai in the 2021–22 Ranji Trophy.

== IPL 2026 ==
Ahead of IPL 2026, Solanki was acquired by Kolkata Knight Riders.
