= Kartik Tyagi =

Indian cricketer (born 2000)

Personal information
- Born: 8 November 2000 (age 26); Hapur, Uttar Pradesh, India
- Height: 1.91 m (6 ft 3 in)
- Batting: Right-handed
- Bowling: Right arm fast
- Role: Bowler

Domestic team information
- Years: Team
- 2017-present: Uttar Pradesh
- 2020–2021: Rajasthan Royals
- 2022–2023: Sunrisers Hyderabad
- 2024: Gujarat Titans
- 2026–present: Kolkata Knight Riders

Career statistics
Competition	FC	LA	T20
Matches	3	17	33
Runs scored	14	21	13
Batting average	7.00	7.00	3.25
100s/50s	0/0	0/0	0/0
Top score	7	8*	7
Balls bowled	318	803	645
Wickets	5	29	25
Bowling average	32.60	25.89	40.12
5 wickets in innings	0	0	0
10 wickets in match	0	0	0
Best bowling	2/15	3/24	2/23
Catches/stumpings	1/–	2/–	3/–
Medal record
Men's cricket
Representing India
ICC U19 Cricket World Cup
Runner-up	2020 South Africa
- Source: ESPNcricinfo, 9 April 2025

Kartik Tyagi (born 8 November 2000) is an Indian cricketer. He plays for Uttar Pradesh in domestic cricket and Kolkata Knight Riders in the Indian Premier League. He made his first-class debut in the 2017–18 Ranji Trophy on 6 October 2017. Tyagi was a key member of India's 2020 U19 World Cup team, where he picked 11 wickets during India's run to the final.

== Career ==
He made his List A debut for Uttar Pradesh in the 2017–18 Vijay Hazare Trophy on 5 February 2018. In December 2019, he was named in India's squad for the 2020 Under-19 Cricket World Cup. In the 2020 IPL auction, he was bought by the Rajasthan Royals ahead of the 20 lacs2020 Indian Premier League. He made his Twenty20 debut for the Rajasthan Royals in the 2020 Indian Premier League on 6 October 2020, against the Mumbai Indians.

On 26 October 2020, Tyagi was named as one of four additional bowlers to travel with Indian cricket team for their tour to Australia.

On 21 September 2021, Tyagi conceded just one run in the final over against Punjab Kings while defending four, and was named man of the match. In February 2022, he was bought by the Sunrisers Hyderabad in the auction for the 2022 Indian Premier League tournament. He was released by Sunrisers Hyderabad in November 2023 after two seasons.
