= Angkrish Raghuvanshi =

Indian cricketer (born 2004)

Personal information
- Born: 5 June 2004 (age 22); Delhi, India
- Batting: Right-handed
- Bowling: Slow left-arm orthodox
- Role: Batter, Occasional wicket-keeper

Domestic team information
- Years: Team
- 2023/24–present: Mumbai
- 2024–present: Kolkata Knight Riders

Career statistics
Competition	FC	LA	T20
Matches	4	18	48
Runs scored	191	535	1074
Batting average	38.20	33.43	28.26
100s/50s	0/2	0/5	0/6
Top score	92	92	71
Catches/stumpings	4/–	11/–	19/1
Medal record
Men's cricket
Representing India
ICC U19 World Cup
Winner	2022 West Indies
ACC U19 Asia Cup
Winner	2021 UAE
- Source: Cricinfo, 15 May 2026

Angkrish Raghuvanshi (born 5 June 2004) is an Indian cricketer. He played for the India national under-19 cricket team in the 2022 ICC Under-19 Cricket World Cup, where he was India's highest run scorer. He won the 2024 Indian Premier League with the Kolkata Knight Riders.

== Early life ==
Raghuvanshi was born in New Delhi in 2004 and later moved to Mumbai to pursue his cricket career. His father, Avneesh Raghuvanshi, is a former tennis player, and his mother, Malika Raghuvanshi, was a basketball player. He began training under Abhishek Nayar and Omkar Salvi. Subsequently, he made a permanent move to Mumbai. KKR acquired him for INR 20 lakh at the IPL 2024 auction.

== Career ==
Raghuvanshi made his T20 debut for Mumbai against Haryana in October 2023. He made his List A cricket debut for Mumbai against Sikkim on 20 November 2023.

In 2024, he made his debut in the Indian Premier League for the Kolkata Knight Riders, scoring 54 runs from 27 balls in his first match against the Delhi Capitals.
