= Kolkata Knight Riders =

Indian cricket franchise

- Nickname: Knights
- League: Indian Premier League

Personnel
- Captain: Vacant
- Coach: Abhishek Nayar
- Owner: Shah Rukh Khan (55%); Mehta Group (45%)
- Manager: Wayne Bentley

Team information
- City: Kolkata, West Bengal
- Colours: KKR
- Founded: 24 January 2008; 18 years ago
- Home ground: Eden Gardens, Kolkata
- Capacity: 68,000

History
- Indian Premier League wins: 3 (2012, 2014, 2024)
- Official website: kkr.in

The Kolkata Knight Riders, also known as KKR, are a professional Twenty20 cricket team based in Kolkata, West Bengal, that competes in the Indian Premier League (IPL). The franchise is owned by actor Shah Rukh Khan, actress Juhi Chawla, and her spouse Jay Mehta. Their home ground is Eden Gardens.

The franchise, which has gained immense popularity due to its association with celebrity owners, qualified for the IPL playoffs for the first time in 2011. They became the IPL champions in 2012, by defeating Chennai Super Kings in the final. They repeated the feat in 2014, defeating Kings XI Punjab. In 2024, they won the title for the third time by beating Sunrisers Hyderabad. The Knight Riders hold the record for the longest winning streak by any IPL team (14).

The team's all-time leading run-scorer is Gautam Gambhir, while their leading wicket-taker is Sunil Narine. The official motto of the team is Korbo, Lorbo, Jeetbo (Perform, Fight, Win) and the official colours are purple and gold.

== Franchise history ==
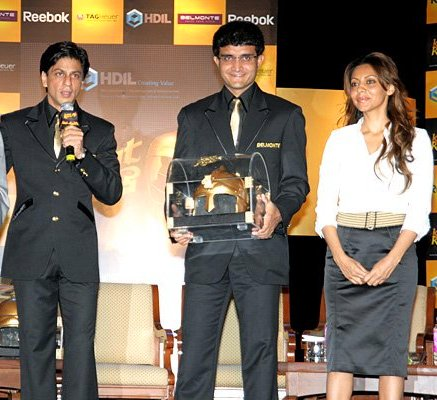
Sourav Ganguly with the symbol of the Kolkata Knight Riders, flanked by Shah Rukh Khan on the left and Gauri Khan on the right.

In 2007, the Board of Control for Cricket in India (BCCI) created the cricket tournament Indian Premier League, based on the Twenty20 format of the game. Eight teams participated in the inaugural tournament held in April – June 2008. The teams representing the eight different cities of India were put up on auction in Mumbai on 20 February 2008. The team representing Kolkata was eventually bought by Bollywood superstar Shah Rukh Khan's company Red Chillies Entertainment in partnership with actress Juhi Chawla and her husband Jay Mehta for a price of $75.09 million, equal to approximately ₹2.98 billion at that time. Sourav Ganguly, a native of West Bengal and former captain of the Indian national team, was named the Icon player for the team. The name of the team is a reference to the popular 1980s American television series Knight Rider.

== Brand ==
=== Valuation ===
According to Forbes in 2022, Kolkata Knight Riders were the third most valuable team in the IPL behind MI and CSK with a valuation of $1.1 billion.

=== Livery ===
Initially, when the Kolkata Knight Riders were first introduced in 2008, the logo of the team consisted of a blazing golden Viking helmet against a black background with the name of the team written in gold next to it. However, the black background was changed to purple in the third season. It was in 2012 that the current logo, which has a blazing purple Corinthian helmet trimmed with gold, with Kolkata Knight Riders written within a shield, was introduced.

The tagline of the team was "All the King's Men" during the first four seasons. However, in the fifth it was replaced by "New Dawn, New Knights". The team's official colours were black and gold during the first two seasons. At the time, Khan said that "golden symbolizes spirit of life and black presents the Goddess Kali." It was later changed to purple and gold during the third season and was kept so. The jersey was created by Bollywood fashion designer Manish Malhotra.

The main theme of the team, Korbo, Lorbo, Jeetbo Re (we will act, fight, and win!), was scored by Vishal–Shekhar duo. A Knight Riders album featuring several singers and music composers, including Usha Uthup and Bappi Lahiri, was also created.

=== Kit suppliers and shirt sponsors ===
Multinational communications corporation Nokia was the official founding sponsor of the Kolkata Knight Riders and remained their principal sponsor until 2014. In 2015, Chinese mobile phone manufacturer Gionee took over as their principal sponsor and signed a three-year deal worth ₹540 million (US$5.8 million). In 2018, Nokia returned as the main sponsor of the Knight Riders, signing a two-year deal. Star Plus, Reebok, HDIL, Kit Kat, SB Nation, Doublemint, SAP AG, Asian Paints, Red FM 93.5, Seiko, U.S. Polo Assn., Uber, Philips, Dish TV, Sansui Electric, Ola Cabs, Exide, SRMB Steel, TTK Prestige, Acko General Insurance, JSW Paints, Manipal Hospitals, FanCode, Listerine, Tecno Mobile, Radio Nasha, Lux Cozi, Ibibo, Sprite, Pepsi, Bira 91, Royal Stag, Pocari Sweat, Sony Music India, Greenply, MoneyGram, Unacademy, Colgate and Radio One have all formerly been either co-sponsors or partners.

In 2020 and 2021, MPL became their principal sponsor. In 2022, the principal sponsor of the Kolkata Knight Riders was the Esports app WinZO Sports. For the 2023 season, their main sponsor was the fantasy sports app MyFab11. In 2024 and 2025, their main shirt sponsors were Dream11.

As of 2026, they have partnerships with BKT Tyres, Thums Up, Big Ant Studios, RR Kabel, Amul, The Telegraph, Fever FM, Google Gemini, Google AI Mode, Kingfisher, HDFC Life and Battlegrounds Mobile India among others. They also have co-sponsorship deals with Jio, Google Pay, Vikram Solar and Amaron.

Reebok was the official kit supplier for the Knight Riders from 2008 to 2013. For 2014 and 2015, U.S. Polo Assn. manufactured kits for the team. In 2021, Indian apparel brand Wrogn Active became the official merchandising partner of the Knight Riders.

Year	Kit manufacturer	Shirt sponsor (front)	Shirt sponsor (back)
2008	Reebok	Nokia	HDIL
2009	Reebok	Nokia	StarPlus
2010	Reebok	Nokia	XXX Energy Drink
2011	Reebok	Nokia	Matrix
2012	Reebok	Nokia	Matrix
2013	Reebok	Nokia	Matrix
2014	U.S. Polo Assn.	Nokia	Sansui
2015	U.S. Polo Assn.	Gionee	Sansui
2016	—N/a	Gionee	Sansui
2017	—N/a	Gionee	Jio
2018	—N/a	Nokia	Jio
2019	—N/a	Nokia	Jio
2020	—N/a	MPL	Jio
2021	Wrogn	MPL	Unacademy
2022	Wrogn	WinZO	Unacademy
2023	Wrogn	MyFab11	BKT
2024	Wrogn	Dream11	BKT
2025	SIX5SIX	Dream11	BKT
2026	SIX5SIX	Vida	BKT

== Rivalries ==
The Knight Riders have historically been a successful franchise in the IPL. This success has led them to have many rivalries with other teams.

=== Mumbai Indians ===
Both teams play in major markets, with Mumbai Indians based in Mumbai and Kolkata Knight Riders based in Kolkata. Mumbai Indians is the most successful IPL franchise with five championships. However, until Mumbai's third championship, both teams were tied with two championships each. In the first two seasons of the IPL, Mumbai swept Kolkata in all four games. It wasn't until the 2010 IPL season that Kolkata won against Mumbai. Both teams have been captained by Indian cricket legends at one point (Mumbai was captained by Sachin Tendulkar and Kolkata was captained by Sourav Ganguly). This rivalry has often played out in Mumbai's favour, as they have won 22 games compared to Kolkata's seven wins. They have faced each other twice in the playoffs.

In 2011, both teams played against each other in the Eliminator round, marking their first playoff appearances. This was the first time that the two teams met in the playoffs. Mumbai won the match by four wickets and advanced to the next round, ultimately losing to the Royal Challengers Bangalore.

In 2012, both teams were chasing a playoff spot in the tournament. The game started poorly for KKR as their batting team struggled to score runs. However, KKR picked up the pace and ended the innings with 140/7. Mumbai, initially in a strong position at 60/2 with more than 10 overs left, unexpectedly collapsed, finishing their innings at 108 all out. Sunil Narine was named Man of the Match with 4 wickets, and KKR eliminated MI from the playoffs. KKR won its first championship that season. Knight Riders' owner Shah Rukh Khan was handed a 5-year ban at Wankhede Stadium, the home ground of Mumbai Indians. He was accused of walking on the field post-match and abusing the security guards. In 2015, the ban was lifted.

Mumbai and Kolkata faced off in the opening match of the 2015 season. Mumbai batted first and scored 168/3. This charge was led by captain Rohit Sharma with his 98 runs. Kolkata captain Gautam Gambhir scored 57 runs, leading his team to victory. Suryakumar Yadav's 46 runs were crucial to KKR's chase.

In 2017, Mumbai earned its 100th T20 win against KKR. Later that season, both teams faced each other in the playoffs in the Qualifier 2 round. KKR had a poor batting performance, posting 107 runs and being all out. Mumbai was able to capitalise and won the match. Mumbai went on to the finals to beat Rising Pune Supergiant to claim their third championship.

From 2015 to 2018, Mumbai Indians held an eight-game winning streak against the Kolkata Knight Riders. That streak was broken on 29 April 2019, when KKR posted a total of 232 runs and won by 34 runs. KKR's Andre Russell scored 80 runs, and MI's Hardik Pandya scored 91 runs. KKR holds the record for highest total for an IPL match played at Eden Gardens. This victory was KKR's 100th T20 win. Mumbai have won all three games between them since then.

The rivalry saw a significant shift in the 2022 season, as Kolkata achieved a "season double" over Mumbai for the first time. In their first meeting, Pat Cummins equaled the then-record for the fastest IPL half-century (14 balls), leading KKR to a 5-wicket win. In the return fixture, KKR won by 52 runs despite a maiden five-wicket haul from MI's Jasprit Bumrah.

In 2023, Mumbai regained ground at the Wankhede Stadium, winning by 5 wickets despite a century from Venkatesh Iyer.

The 2024 season marked another dominant year for Kolkata, who again swept the season series 2–0. On 3 May 2024, KKR defeated Mumbai by 24 runs at the Wankhede Stadium—their first victory at the venue in 12 years. Later, KKR won the return fixture at Eden Gardens by 18 runs, making them the first team to qualify for the 2024 playoffs, a season where they eventually claimed their third title.

=== Royal Challengers Bangalore ===
==== 2008 ====
The rivalry between the Knight Riders and the Royal Challengers Bengaluru is the oldest in the Indian Premier League history. The inaugural match of the inaugural edition was played between both teams, in which KKR clinched a huge victory by a margin of 140 runs. Brendon McCullum was awarded the first-ever man-of-the-match award of the tournament, due to his blistering 158* (73), dominating the whole RCB bowling unit.

==== 2009 ====
In the 2009 edition, the Royal Challengers won in both encounters against the Knight Riders. During their second meet, which was also the tournament's 100th match, Ross Taylor played a notable innings, scoring 81* (33), contributing significantly to RCB's victory by six wickets.

==== 2012 ====
In the 2012 edition, KKR was at the lower half of the IPL table and needed to win the crucial match against RCB. KKR won the toss and chose to bat first. Skipper Gautam Gambhir led from the front with 93 (51). In reply, RCB lost wickets at regular intervals, as only Chris Gayle managed to put up a fight with a score of 86 (58). The next time they met, Gambhir again was the thorn in RCB's team as he top scored for KKR at a tough pitch, taking KKR to a competitive total of 165. RCB in reply made 129, as Lakshmipathy Balaji ripped through their line-up with a 4/18 in 4 overs.

In the 2015 IPL edition, RCB and KKR took part in a match reduced due to rain. It was reduced to a 10-over match. RCB won the toss and elected to field. For KKR, Andre Russell was the top scorer as he scored 45 off just 17 balls. He took them to a score of 111/4 in just 10 overs. Mitchell Starc took one wicket for 15 runs in 2 overs. In reply, RCB were at 0–48 at 3.4 overs before Brad Hogg got Chris Gayle out. After that, RCB stuttered and started to collapse as they were reduced to 3–81 in 7.2 overs. When Virat Kohli got out to Andre Russell, the match looked to be over for RCB. However, Mandeep Singh scored 45 off just 18 balls, hitting 3 sixes and 4 fours.

In the 2017 IPL edition, Kolkata Knight Riders and Royal Challengers Bangalore again faced each other twice. In the first match between them, RCB got KKR out for a score of 131 after KKR had made a strong start of 0–48 in 3.3 overs. However, KKR dismissed RCB for 49, the lowest team score in the history of IPL. Nathan Coulter Nile, Colin de Grandhomme and Chris Woakes got three wickets each. In the next match, Sunil Narine scored what was then the fastest fifty in IPL (50 off 15 balls – which is now the second-fastest). KKR made the highest score made in powerplay in any IPL match, and easily chased down the target offered by RCB.

The 2019 IPL saw Virat Kohli scoring 84 off 49 and AB de Villiers scoring 63 off 32, taking RCB to a total of 205/3. KKR had a strong start, scoring 28/0 in 1.3 overs, before losing wickets at regular intervals and having their run rate reduced. They were 139/4 in 15.5 overs. However, Dinesh Karthik and Andre Russell brought back the chase under control. Karthik got out after scoring 19 off 15, leaving KKR at 153/5 in 17 overs. Andre Russell, however, took KKR over the line as he scored 48 off 13, hitting Mohammed Siraj for 23 runs in one over.

In the next match, RCB struck back as Virat Kohli made his 5th IPL century, scoring 100 runs in 58 balls only. Moeen Ali scored 66 runs in only 28 balls as RCB scored 213 runs. For KKR, Nitish Rana scored 85 off 46 and Andre Russell scored 65 off 25, taking the game down to the wire. However, RCB won the match by 10 runs, with Virat Kohli being Man of the Match.

During the 2021 season, the teams met in the Eliminator in Sharjah. Sunil Narine took 4 wickets for 21 runs and hit three consecutive sixes to help KKR win by 4 wickets and knock RCB out of the tournament. In 2023, KKR achieved a "season double," highlighted by a match at Eden Gardens where KKR's spin trio (Narine, Varun Chakaravarthy, and Suyash Sharma) took nine wickets combined to bowl RCB out for 123.

==== Championship Dominance and Modern Era (2024–2025) ====
During the 2024 season, Kolkata achieved a season sweep over Bengaluru. On 29 March, KKR defeated RCB by 7 wickets at the M. Chinnaswamy Stadium, with Sunil Narine earning Player of the Match honors. The return fixture at Eden Gardens on 21 April was a high-scoring thriller where KKR posted their highest total against RCB (222/6) and secured a 1-run victory after a run-out on the final delivery.

In the 2025 season, both teams entered with new captains: Ajinkya Rahane for KKR and Rajat Patidar for RCB. On 22 March 2025, RCB broke a four-match losing streak against KKR by winning the season opener at Eden Gardens by 7 wickets. Virat Kohli (59*) and Phil Salt (56) led the chase of 175, with Kohli becoming the third player to reach 1,000 career runs against KKR. The reverse fixture on 17 May 2025 was abandoned due to rain.

As of the conclusion of the 2025 season, Kolkata Knight Riders lead the head-to-head record 21–15, with one match ending in no result.

=== Sunrisers Hyderabad ===
The rivalry with Sunrisers Hyderabad (SRH) intensified during the 2024 season, as the two teams met three times, including in the final. Kolkata has historically held the upper hand in this matchup, winning 20 of their 30 total encounters as of the conclusion of the 2025 season.

==== 2024: Championship Victory ====
In 2024, Kolkata dominated Hyderabad by winning all three of their meetings. After a narrow 4-run victory in the league stage, the two teams met in Qualifier 1, where KKR chased down 160 in just 13.4 overs to reach the final.

On 26 May 2024, the teams faced off in the IPL Final at M. A. Chidambaram Stadium in Chennai. KKR's bowling attack, led by Mitchell Starc and Andre Russell, dismantled the Hyderabad batting lineup, bowling them out for 113—the lowest total in an IPL final history. Kolkata chased the target in just 10.3 overs with 8 wickets to spare, securing their third championship title.

==== 2025: Record Scores and Results ====
The 2025 season saw both teams exchange dominant victories. In their first meeting at Eden Gardens, KKR recorded an 80-run win after posting 200/6, with Venkatesh Iyer scoring 60 (29) and Vaibhav Arora taking three wickets.

However, in the return fixture on 25 May 2025 at the Arun Jaitley Stadium in Delhi, Hyderabad achieved their biggest win over Kolkata by 110 runs. SRH posted a massive total of 278/3, led by Heinrich Klaasen's unbeaten 105 (39) and Travis Head's 76 (40). In response, Kolkata was bowled out for 168, marking their heaviest defeat in franchise history by margin of runs.

As of May 2025, Kolkata Knight Riders lead the head-to-head record 20–10.

== Home ground ==
The home venue of the Knight Riders is Eden Gardens (with the two ends of the crease called the High Court End and the Club House End). Owned by the Cricket Association of Bengal, it was the largest cricket stadium in India and had a seating capacity of over 90,000. In 2011, the stadium was renovated to meet the standards set by the International Cricket Council for the 2011 Cricket World Cup; reducing its capacity to around 68,000. The renovated stadium includes a new clubhouse and players' facilities, upgrading the exterior wall, cladding the existing roof structure with a new metal skin, and general infrastructure improvements. In 2013, two of the team's home matches were hosted by the JSCA International Cricket Stadium in Ranchi.

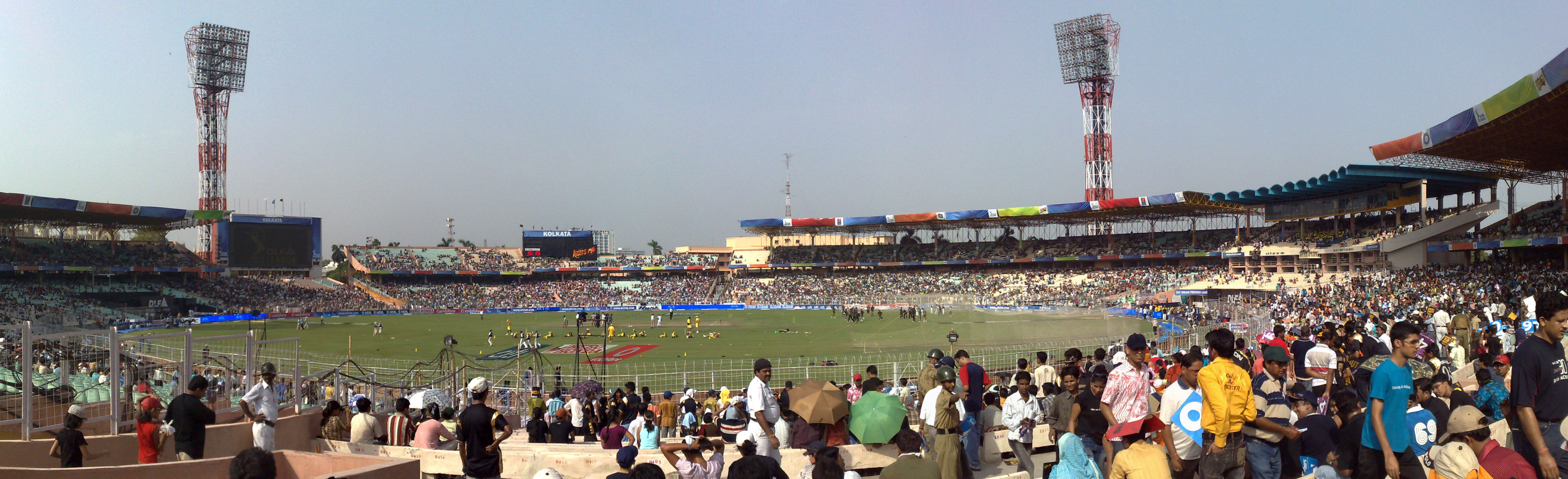
Panoramic view of the Eden Gardens stadium during IPL 2008.

== Players ==
Sourav Ganguly, the former captain of the Indian cricket team, was the icon player and led the franchise in the 2008 and 2010 seasons. Brendon McCullum led the team in the intervening period. Both the captains were released before the 2011 season. The former team included all-rounders Chris Gayle, David Hussey, Mohammad Hafeez, Laxmi Ratan Shukla, Angelo Mathews, batsman Ricky Ponting, Brad Hodge, Salman Butt, and wicket-keeper Wriddhiman Saha. The main bowlers were Umar Gul, Shoaib Akhtar, Ishant Sharma, Ashok Dinda, Ajit Agarkar and Murali Karthik. Australian batsman Brad Hodge and bowlers Ajantha Mendis and Charl Langeveldt were bought outside the IPL auction in late 2008.

At the 2009 auction, the team bought Bangladeshi all-rounder Mashrafe Mortaza for $600,000. Due to the unavailability of Pakistani players starting 2009, KKR had to suspend the contract of Umar Gul, who was a key performer from the 2008 season. On 26 April 2009, KKR administration sent back two of its players, Akash Chopra and Sanjay Bangar, due to poor performance. Shane Bond was acquired after releasing Ricky Ponting, Morne van Wyk, and the Pakistani players Umar Gul, Salman Butt, Mohammad Hafeez and Shoaib Akhtar before the third season. Moises Henriques was traded to Delhi in return for Owais Shah and Manoj Tiwary. Thus, their overseas roster for the 2010 season consisted of Shane Bond, Mashrafe Mortaza, Brendon McCullum, Charl Langeveldt, Ajantha Mendis, Angelo Mathews, Brad Hodge, David Hussey, Owais Shah and Chris Gayle.

2011 heralded the beginning of a new era for KKR. In the 2011 season, KKR drastically revamped their squad. Former captain and icon player Sourav Ganguly was not purchased in the January auction. This led to protest rallies, signature campaigns throughout the country and abroad along with stadium protests by various fan groups, such as "No Dada No KKR", which received both national and international press attention. The team appointed Gautam Gambhir, who was bought for a record-breaking $2.4 million as skipper. Yusuf Pathan was also picked up for $2.1 million. Other international names who were added include Shakib Al Hasan, Brad Haddin, Jacques Kallis, Brett Lee, Ryan ten Doeschate, Eoin Morgan and James Pattinson. Haddin was replaced by Mark Boucher mid-season due to injury.

In the 2012 auction, KKR bought back their former captain, Brendon McCullum. They also acquired West Indian spinner Sunil Narine and South African fast bowler Marchant de Lange.

The team later added four domestic players to their squad, including Debabrata Das and Iresh Saxena from Bengal, Saurashtra's Chirag Jani, and Sanju Samson from Kerala. However, in November 2012, KKR released the latter three from their team along with Jaydev Unadkat, a key performer from the previous seasons. In the 2013 auction, the team acquired only two overseas players, Sachithra Senanayake and Ryan McLaren.

Before the February 2014 auction, the team had only retained their key performers Gautam Gambhir and Sunil Narine. From the auctions that took place, the team brought back Jacques Kallis and Yusuf Pathan with their right-to-match (RTM) card. Also keeping their place in the squad were Ryan ten Doeschate and Shakib Al Hasan. New international players were Morne Morkel, Patrick Cummins and Chris Lynn. Prominent Indian players bought included Robin Uthappa, Umesh Yadav, Manish Pandey, Suryakumar Yadav and Piyush Chawla.

KKR's impressive additions in the 2015 auction were veteran Australian bowler Brad Hogg and wicket-keeper Sheldon Jackson. Before the auction in February 2016, they released Ryan ten Doeschate, who was a part of their team for five consecutive seasons, along with pace bowler Pat Cummins. The Knight Riders were particularly noted for their change in approach from the previous auctions where they had concentrated on spinners. For the 2016 edition, however, they acquired as many as six pacers in the form of all-rounders John Hastings, Colin Munro, Jason Holder and Rajagopal Sathish as well as bowlers Ankit Rajpoot and Jaydev Unadkat, with the latter being a former player of the squad. They signed one spinner Manan Sharma.

Before the 2017 auctions, they released Morne Morkel, Brad Hogg, Jason Holder, Colin Munro, John Hastings, Jaydev Unadkat, Rajagopal Sathish, Manan Sharma and replacement signing Shaun Tait. From the 2017 Indian Premier League auction, they signed Trent Boult, English all-rounder Chris Woakes, Australian Nathan Coulter-Nile, West Indian Darren Bravo and Jamaican Rovman Powell. The domestic players signed were Rishi Dhawan, Ishank Jaggi, Sayan Ghosh and R Sanjay Yadav. At the time, Andre Russell was banned for one year for doping; he was replaced by Colin de Grandhomme for the season. In January 2018, they only retained West Indian cricketers Sunil Narine and Andre Russell. Their two-time title winning captain Gautam Gambhir was released. At the auction, they retained Robin Uthappa, Piyush Chawla and Kuldeep Yadav using RTM (Right-To-Match) card. KKR also bought back opener Chris Lynn and uncapped Indian batsman Ishank Jaggi. Other uncapped batsmen bought were Nitish Rana, Shubman Gill, Cameron Delport, Rinku Singh and Apoorv Wankhade. They also bought West Indian uncapped all-rounder Javon Searles, and uncapped Indian all-rounders Kamlesh Nagarkoti and Shivam Mavi. Other signings were veteran Indian wicket-keeper Dinesh Karthik, Australian pace bowlers Mitchell Starc and Mitchell Johnson, and former Knight Riders player Vinay Kumar.

On 4 March 2018, Dinesh Karthik was appointed as the captain of KKR for IPL 2018 and Robin Uthappa was named vice-captain. Mitchell Starc was ruled out before the season due to injury and Tom Curran was announced as his replacement. Ahead of the auction for IPL 2019, eight players were released from the squad including Mitchell Starc and his replacement Tom Curran.

At the auction, their high-profile buys were Carlos Brathwaite for ₹50 million (US$530,000) and New Zealand pacer Lockie Ferguson for ₹16 million (US$170,000). Other players bought were South African pacer Anrich Nortje, English duo Harry Gurney and Joe Denly as well as uncapped Indian players Nikhil Naik, Prithvi Raj Yarra and Shrikant Mundhe for their base prices of ₹2 million (US$21,000) each. Before IPL 2020, KKR released 11 players from their squad and also traded in Siddhesh Lad from Mumbai Indians.

At the 2020 IPL Auction, KKR bought pace bowler Pat Cummins for ₹15.5 crores. This was the biggest buy in the auction. KKR also purchased Eoin Morgan, who just came off as captain of the World Cup winning England squad. He was bought for ₹5.25 crores. On 16 October 2020, Kolkata Knight Riders skipper Dinesh Karthik handed over Kolkata Knight Riders' captaincy to Eoin Morgan.

Since 2022 was a mega auction, Kolkata Knight Riders had to release the majority of players, including top order batsman Shubman Gill, skipper Eoin Morgan and vice captain Dinesh Karthik. KKR retained 4 players: Andre Russell for ₹12 crore, Sunil Narine for ₹6 crore, and Varun Chakravarthy and Venkatesh Iyer for ₹8 crore each. With ₹48 crore in their purse, KKR bought Shreyas Iyer for ₹12.25 crore and re-signed Pat Cummins for ₹7.25 crore. KKR also bought back Nitish Rana, Sheldon Jackson, Rinku Singh, Shivam Mavi and Tim Southee. Overseas players included English wicket-keeper Sam Billings for ₹2 crore, English batsman Alex Hales for ₹1.5 crore, Afghan all-rounder Mohammed Nabi for ₹1 crore and Sri Lankan all-rounder Chamika Karunaratne for ₹50 lakh. KKR also signed top order batsman Ajinkya Rahane, Jharkhand left-handed spin all-rounder Anukul Roy and Jammu and Kashmir pacer Rasikh Salam Dar. They also bought back their former player Umesh Yadav for the base price of ₹2 crores, who last played for them in 2017. Alex Hales didn't turn up for the IPL citing personal reasons and KKR signed Australian skipper Aaron Finch as his replacement. In the middle of tournament, Rasikh suffered an injury which ruled him out of IPL tournament. Due to this, KKR signed fast bowler Harshit Rana as the replacement.

=== Captains ===
Last updated: 11 April 2025

Player (Note: The information in the nationality column is according to Cricinfo. This information may not necessarily reflect the player's birthplace or citizenship.)	From	To	Matches	Won	Lost	Tied	NR	Win%	Best Result
(India) Sourav Ganguly	2008	2010	27	13	14	1	0	44.44	6/8 (2008, 2010)
(New Zealand) Brendon McCullum	2009	2009	13	3	9	1	0	23.07	8/8 (2009)
(India) Gautam Gambhir	2011	2017	122	69	59	1	1	56.55	Winner (2012, 2014)
(South Africa) Jacques Kallis	2011	2011	2	1	1	0	0	50	Stand-In
(India) Dinesh Karthik	2018	2020	37	19	17	1	0	51.35	3rd (2018)
(England) Eoin Morgan	2020	2021	24	11	12	1	0	45.83	Runner-up (2021)
(India) Shreyas Iyer	2022	2024	30	17	11	0	2	56.70	Winner (2024)
(India) Nitish Rana	2023	2023	14	6	8	0	0	42.85	7/10 (2023)
(India) Ajinkya Rahane	2025	TBD	10	4	5	0	1	40	TBD

== Current squad ==
- Players with international caps are listed in **bold**.

No.	Name	Nationality	Birth date and age	Batting style	Bowling style	Year signed	Salary	Notes
Batters
35	**Rinku Singh**	India	12 October 1997 (age 29)	Left-handed	Right-arm off break	2018	₹13 crore (US$1.4 million)	
16	**Finn Allen**	New Zealand	22 April 1999 (age 27)	Right-handed	Right-arm off break	2026	₹2 crore (US$210,000)	Overseas
9	**Manish Pandey**	India	10 September 1989 (age 37)	Right-handed	Right-arm medium	2024	₹75 lakh (US$80,000)	
19	**Ramandeep Singh**	India	13 April 1997 (age 29)	Right-handed	Right-arm medium	2024	₹4 crore (US$430,000)	
4	Sarthak Ranjan	India	25 September 1996 (age 30)	Right-handed	Right-arm leg break	2026	₹30 lakh (US$32,000)	
Wicket-keepers
18	Angkrish Raghuvanshi	India	5 June 2004 (age 22)	Right-handed	Left-arm orthodox	2024	₹3 crore (US$320,000)	
43	**Tim Seifert**	New Zealand	14 December 1994 (age 31)	Right-handed	—N/a	2026	₹1.5 crore (US$160,000)	Overseas
All-rounders
74	**Sunil Narine**	West Indies	26 May 1988 (age 38)	Left-handed	Right-arm off break	2012	₹12 crore (US$1.3 million)	Overseas
45	Anukul Roy	India	30 November 1998 (age 27)	Left-handed	Left-arm slow orthodox	2022	₹40 lakh (US$43,000)	
52	**Rovman Powell**	West Indies	23 July 1993 (age 33)	Right-handed	Right-arm medium fast	2025	₹1.5 crore (US$160,000)	Overseas
42	**Cameron Green**	Australia	3 June 1999 (age 27)	Right Handed	Right-arm fast medium	2026	₹25.20 crore (US$2.7 million)	Overseas
Fast bowlers
22	**Harshit Rana**	India	22 December 2001 (age 24)	Right-handed	Right-arm fast	2022	₹4 crore (US$430,000)	
14	Vaibhav Arora	India	14 December 1997 (age 28)	Right-handed	Right-arm medium fast	2023	₹1.8 crore (US$190,000)	
26	Kartik Tyagi	India	8 November 2000 (age 26)	Right-handed	Right-arm fast	2026	₹30 lakh (US$32,000)	
33	Saurabh Dubey	India	23 January 1998 (age 28)	Right-handed	Left-arm medium fast	2026	₹30 lakh (US$32,000)	
Spin bowlers
29	**Varun Chakravarthy**	India	29 August 1991 (age 35)	Right-handed	Right-arm leg break	2020	₹12 crore (US$1.3 million)	
46	Prashant Solanki	India	22 February 2000 (age 26)	Right-handed	Right-arm leg break	2026	₹30 lakh (US$32,000)	
Source: KKR Squad

== Seasons ==
=== Indian Premier League ===
Season	League standing	Final standing
2008	6th out of 8	League stage
2009	8th out of 8	League stage
2010	6th out of 8	League stage
2011	4th out of 10	Playoffs
2012	2nd out of 9	Champions
2013	7th out of 9	League stage
2014	2nd out of 8	Champions
2015	5th out of 8	League stage
2016	4th out of 8	Playoffs
2017	3rd out of 8	Playoffs
2018	3rd out of 8	Playoffs
2019	5th out of 8	League stage
2020	5th out of 8	League stage
2021	4th out of 8	Runners-up
2022	7th out of 10	League stage
2023	7th out of 10	League stage
2024	1st out of 10	Champions
2025	8th out of 10	League stage
2026	7th out of 10	League stage

=== Champions League T20 ===
Season	League standing	Final standing
2011	5th out of 10	League stage
2012	6th out of 10	League stage
2013	DNQ	
2014	2nd out of 10	Runners-up

== Administration and support staff ==
Position	Name
CEO and Managing Director	Venky Mysore
Team Manager	Wayne Bentley
Head Coach	Abhishek Nayar
Mentor	Dwayne Bravo
Assistant Coach	Shane Watson
Bowling Coach	Tim Southee
Power Coach	Andre Russell
Fielding Coach	Dishant Yagnik
Head of Scouting	Biju George; Manvinder Bisla
Head of Cricket Strategy	Ryan ten Doeschate
Analyst	Nathan Leamon
Strength and Conditioning Coach	Chris Donaldson
Assistant Strength and Conditioning Coach	Sagar VM
Physiotherapist	Prasanth Panchada

- Source: KKR Staff

== Statistics ==
=== Overall results ===
Updated as of 25 May 2026

IPL summary of results
Year	Played	Wins	Losses	Tied	NR	Win %	Final standing
2008	14	6	7	0	1	46.16	6/8
2009	14	3	10	0	1	23.07	8/8
2010	14	7	7	0	0	50.00	6/8
2011	15	8	7	0	0	53.33	4/10
2012	18	12	5	0	1	70.58	1/9
2013	16	6	10	0	0	37.50	7/9
2014	16	11	5	0	0	68.75	1/8
2015	14	7	6	0	1	53.84	5/8
2016	15	8	7	0	0	53.33	4/8
2017	16	9	7	0	0	56.25	3/8
2018	16	9	7	0	0	56.25	3/8
2019	14	6	8	0	0	42.86	5/8
2020	14	7	7	0	0	50.00	5/8
2021	17	9	8	0	0	52.94	2/8
2022	14	6	8	0	0	42.85	7/10
2023	14	6	8	0	0	42.85	7/10
2024	16	11	3	0	2	78.57	1/10
2025	14	5	7	0	2	41.66	8/10
2026	14	6	7	0	1	46.15	7/10
Total	285	142	134	0	9	51.44	

- Abandoned matches are counted as NR (no result)
- Win or loss by super over or boundary count included

Source: ESPNcricinfo

=== Result summary ===
Updated as of 25 May 2026

Opposition	Span	Mat	Won	Lost	Tied	Win %
Chennai Super Kings	2008–2015; 2018–present	32	11	21	0	34.37
Delhi Capitals	2008–present	36	20	16	0	55.55
Mumbai Indians	2008–present	37	12	25	0	32.43
Punjab Kings	2008–present	34	21	13	0	61.76
Rajasthan Royals	2008–2015; 2018–present	31	17	14	0	54.83
Royal Challengers Bangalore	2008–present	36	20	16	0	55.55
Sunrisers Hyderabad	2013–present	32	21	11	0	65.62
Gujarat Titans	2022–present	6	2	4	0	33.33
Lucknow Super Giants	2022–present	8	3	5	0	37.50
Deccan Chargers	2008–2012	9	7	2	0	77.78
Kochi Tuskers Kerala	2011	2	0	2	0	0.00
Pune Warriors India	2011–2013	5	4	1	0	80.00
Gujarat Lions	2016–2017	4	1	3	0	25.00
Rising Pune Supergiant	2016–2017	4	3	1	0	75.00

Legend:

Team now defunct

=== Overall results in Champions League Twenty20 ===
Year	Matches	Wins	Losses	No result	% win	% Summary
2011	6	3	3	0	50.00	5/10 (13)
2012	4	1	2	1	33.33	6/10 (14)
2014	6	5	1	0	83.33	2/10 (14)
Total	16	9	6	1	60.00	

Result summary in Champions League Twenty20
Opposition	Span	Matches	Won	Lost	Tied	No result	% win
Chevrolet Warriors	2011	1	1	0	0	0	100.00
Dolphins	2014	1	1	0	0	0	100.00
Hobart Hurricanes	2014	1	1	0	0	0	100.00
Lahore Lions	2014	1	1	0	0	0	100.00
Nashua Titans	2012	1	1	0	0	0	100.00
Perth Scorchers	2012–2014	2	1	0	0	1	100.00
Royal Challengers Bangalore	2011	1	1	0	0	0	100.00
Auckland Aces	2011–2012	2	1	1	0	0	50.00
Chennai Super Kings	2014	2	1	1	0	0	50.00
Delhi Capitals	2012	1	0	1	0	0	0.00
Somerset Sabres	2011	2	0	2	0	0	0.00
South Australia Redbacks	2011	1	0	1	0	0	0.00

== Knight Riders Group ==
Kolkata Knight Riders is part of the Knight Riders Group (KRG), a global brand in cricket, with franchises in the Caribbean Premier League and Women's Caribbean Premier League (Trinbago Knight Riders), in the International League T20 (Abu Dhabi Knight Riders) of UAE, and the Major League Cricket (Los Angeles Knight Riders). In June 2015, the team's ownership group bought a stake in Caribbean Premier League's Trinidad and Tobago Red Steel, and renamed it the Trinbago Knight Riders in 2016. The team invested in the American T20 league Major League Cricket in December 2020.

KRG had also acquired a franchise in Cricket South Africa's T20 Global League, but the league was eventually scrapped and replaced with Mzansi Super League as the board was unable to secure a broadcasting deal. In 2021, the Knight Riders Group CEO, Venky Mysore, had announced their intentions to invest in ECB's new competition format, The Hundred. However, the plan failed to materialise. Other Indian Premier League franchises have followed KRG's path and have franchises in T20 leagues outside India, or have shown interest for the same. In 2022, KRG announced the construction of a 10,000-seater stadium in Los Angeles, in partnership with Major League Cricket, for their franchise (Los Angeles Knight Riders).

Knight Riders Group

Current Teams
- Kolkata Knight Riders (2008–present) 🏆×3 (2012, 2014, 2024); Trinbago Knight Riders (2015–present) 🏆×5 (2015, 2017, 2018, 2020, 2025); Trinbago Knight Riders Women (2022–present) 🏆×1 (2022); Abu Dhabi Knight Riders (2023–present); Los Angeles Knight Riders (2023–present) 🏆×1 (2026)

Stadium
- Knight Riders Cricket Ground (2026–present)

Defunct Teams
- Cape Town Knight Riders (2017)

== In popular culture ==
A reality show by the name Knights and Angels aired on NDTV Imagine in 2009 to pick cheerleaders for the Knight Riders for the 2009 edition of the Indian Premier League.

In 2014, a documentary titled Living With KKR aired on the Discovery Channel. It covered the journey of the team from its disappointing first three seasons to its redemption as IPL champions in 2012.

== See also ==
- Trinbago Knight Riders
- Abu Dhabi Knight Riders
- Los Angeles Knight Riders
