= Manvinder Bisla =

Indian cricketer (born 1984)

Personal information
- Full name: Manvinder Sultansingh Bisla
- Born: 27 December 1984 (age 41); Hisar, Haryana, India
- Height: 6 ft 1 in (1.85 m)
- Batting: Right-handed
- Role: Wicket-keeper

Domestic team information
- Years: Team
- 2002/03: Haryana
- 2003/04–2011: Himachal Pradesh
- 2009: Deccan Chargers (squad no. 36)
- 2010: Kings XI Punjab (squad no. 36)
- 2011–2014: Kolkata Knight Riders (squad no. 36)
- 2015: Royal Challengers Bangalore

Career statistics
Competition	FC	LA	T20
Matches	49	48	65
Runs scored	2207	1132	1324
Batting average	30.23	26.95	21.70
100s/50s	4/11	1/6	0/6
Top score	168	104	92
Balls bowled	120	290	0
Wickets	0	10	–
Bowling average	–	20.30	–
5 wickets in innings	–	0	–
10 wickets in match	–	0	–
Best bowling	–	3/23	–
Catches/stumpings	81/12	29/40	40/15
- Source: ESPNcricinfo, 5 April 2023

Manvinder Sultansingh Bisla (born 27 December 1984) is an Indian cricketer. He is a wicket-keeper and right-handed batsman who currently plays for Goa. Bisla is one of the lesser known of the wicketkeeper batsmen that Indian cricket unearthed from the junior and India-A ranks in the last decade, the others being Ajay Ratra, Parthiv Patel, M.S Dhoni and Dinesh Karthik. Bisla was the stand-in captain of the U-19 test team during their tour to England in 2002 season. The match ended in a draw.

== Playing career ==
Bisla made his debut in Ranji Trophy domestic cricket in 2002 for his home state – Haryana. He moved to Himachal Pradesh in 2003/04 season and currently represents Goa in Indian domestic cricket, having joined them in 2012. He was part of the IPL-winning Deccan Chargers team in 2009, was picked by Kings XI Punjab in 2010. He made his debut in 2010.

In 2011 he was signed by the IPL franchise Kolkata Knight Riders. He played as the wicket keeper of KKR in first 5 matches as Brad Haddin was not available. He opened the batting with all rounder Jacques Kallis from South Africa and also made a partnership of 145 with Kallis. In IPL 2012, he played 7 matches and scored 213 runs with 1 half century in the final match of the tournament. He took 6 catches and 2 stumpings behind the stumps.

He played a match winning innings of 89 off 48 balls against the Chennai Super Kings in the final of the 2012 IPL to guide his team to a 5 wicket win. He received the Man of the Match award for this innings.

He was transferred from Kolkata Knight Riders to the Royal Challengers Bangalore for the 2015's edition of the Indian Premier League. He no longer plays the IPL. In October 2020, he was drafted by the Colombo Kings for the inaugural edition of the Lanka Premier League.

== Personal life ==
Bisla was educated in D.A.V. Public School, sector 14, Faridabad, and married Arpita on 11 March 2007

== Seasons by seasons at IPL ==
IPL Batting Statistics of Manvinder Bisla
Year	Team	Innings	Runs	HS	100s	50s	4s	6s
2010	Kings XI Punjab	10	218	75	0	1	12	6
2011	Kolkata Knight Riders	5	72	27	0	0	8	0
2012	Kolkata Knight Riders	7	213	89	0	1	16	10
2013	Kolkata Knight Riders	14	255	92	0	2	31	12
2010–2013 Total		36	758	92	0	4	87	28
