= Anukul Roy =

Indian cricketer (born 1998)

Personal information
- Full name: Anukul Sudhakar Roy
- Born: 30 November 1998 (age 27); Seraikela Kharsawan, Jharkhand, India
- Batting: Left-handed
- Bowling: Slow left-arm orthodox
- Role: All-rounder

Domestic team information
- Years: Team
- 2017/18–present: Jharkhand
- 2019-2021: Mumbai Indians
- 2022-present: Kolkata Knight Riders

Career statistics
Competition	FC	LA	T20
Matches	44	56	70
Runs scored	1,729	1,099	960
Batting average	27.01	30.52	25.94
100s/50s	4/7	0/6	0/2
Top score	153	96*	95*
Balls bowled	7,453	2,388	1,283
Wickets	133	55	56
Bowling average	27.03	34.69	27.41
5 wickets in innings	6	0	0
10 wickets in match	2	–	–
Best bowling	8/55	4/31	4/17
Catches/stumpings	31/–	27/–	39/–
- Source: ESPNcricinfo, 28 December 2025

Anukul Sudhakar Roy (Maithili: अनुकूल सुधाकर रॉय; born 30 November 1998) is an Indian cricketer who plays for Jharkhand and Kolkata Knight Riders. In December 2017, he was named in India's squad for the 2018 Under-19 Cricket World Cup. He was the joint highest wicket taker in the Under-19 Cricket World Cup.

He was born into a Maithil family in Seraikela Kharsawan in the state of Jharkhand. His family hails from Rosera, Samastipur district in the Mithila region of Bihar.

He made his List A debut for Jharkhand in the 2017–18 Vijay Hazare Trophy on 8 February 2018. He made his first-class debut for Jharkhand in the 2018–19 Ranji Trophy on 1 November 2018. He was the leading wicket-taker for Jharkhand in the tournament, with 30 dismissals in nine matches. He made his Twenty20 debut for Jharkhand in the 2018–19 Syed Mushtaq Ali Trophy on 21 February 2019. In October 2019, he was named in India B's squad for the 2019–20 Deodhar Trophy.

In February 2022, he was bought by the Kolkata Knight Riders in the auction for the 2022 Indian Premier League tournament. He made his debut for his new side against RR on 2 May 2022. He won the 2024 Indian Premier League title with them.
