= 2023 Punjab Kings season =

Overview of Punjab Kings in 2023

Punjab Kings
2023 season
- Coach: Trevor Bayliss
- Captain: Shikhar Dhawan
- Ground(s): Inderjit Singh Bindra Stadium, Mohali
- Most runs: Shikhar Dhawan (373)
- Most wickets: Arshdeep Singh (17)

The 2023 season was the 16th season for the Indian Premier League franchise Punjab Kings. They were one of the ten teams compete in the 2023 Indian Premier League.

== Background ==
In September 2022, Trevor Bayliss replaced Anil Kumble as the side's head coach. In November, Shikhar Dhawan replaced Mayank Agarwal as the captain.

== Squad ==
- Players with international caps are listed in **bold**
- Ages are given as of 31 March 2023, the date of the first match played in the tournament

No.	Name	Nationality	Birth date	Batting style	Bowling style	Year signed	Salary	Notes
Batters
42	**Shikhar Dhawan**	India	5 December 1985 (aged 37)	Left-handed	Right-arm off break	2022	₹8.25 crore (US$940,000)	Captain
45	Harpreet Singh Bhatia	India	11 August 1991 (aged 31)	Left-handed	Right-arm medium	2023	₹40 lakh (US$46,000)	
23	**Liam Livingstone**	England	4 August 1993 (aged 29)	Right-handed	Right-arm leg break	2022	₹11.5 crore (US$1.3 million)	Overseas
21	Shivam Singh	India	18 November 1996 (aged 26)	Right-handed	Right-arm Off spin	2023	₹20 lakh (US$23,000)	
14	Atharva Taide	India	26 April 2000 (aged 22)	Left-handed	Slow left arm orthodox	2022	₹20 lakh (US$23,000)	
All-rounders
24	**Sikandar Raza**	Zimbabwe	24 April 1986 (aged 36)	Right-handed	Right-arm Off spin	2022	₹50 lakh (US$57,000)	Overseas
19	**Rishi Dhawan**	India	19 February 1990 (aged 33)	Right-handed	Right-arm Fast medium	2022	₹55 lakh (US$63,000)	
10	Baltej Singh	India	4 November 1990 (aged 32)	Right-handed	Right-arm medium	2022	₹20 lakh (US$23,000)	
35	Shahrukh Khan	India	27 May 1995 (aged 27)	Right-handed	Off break	2022	₹9 crore (US$1.0 million)	
95	Harpreet Brar	India	16 September 1995 (aged 27)	Left-handed	Slow left-arm orthodox	2022	₹3.8 crore (US$430,000)	
58	**Sam Curran**	England	3 June 1998 (aged 24)	Left-handed	Left-arm Fast medium	2023	₹18.5 crore (US$2.1 million)	Overseas
9	Mohit Rathee	India	13 January 1999 (aged 24)	Right-handed	Right-arm Leg spin	2023	₹20 lakh (US$23,000)	
Wicket-keepers
51	**Jonny Bairstow**	England	26 September 1989 (aged 33)	Right-handed	Right-arm off break	2022	₹6.75 crore (US$770,000)	Overseas
54	**Bhanuka Rajapaksa**	Sri Lanka	24 October 1991 (aged 31)	Left-handed	Right-arm medium	2022	₹50 lakh (US$57,000)	Overseas
99	Jitesh Sharma	India	22 October 1993 (aged 29)	Right-handed	-	2022	₹20 lakh (US$23,000)	
84	Prabhsimran Singh	India	10 August 2000 (aged 22)	Right-handed	-	2022	₹60 lakh (US$69,000)	
Spin bowlers
11	**Rahul Chahar**	India	4 August 1999 (aged 23)	Right-handed	Right-arm leg break	2022	₹5.25 crore (US$600,000)	
Pace bowlers
72	**Nathan Ellis**	Australia	22 September 1994 (aged 28)	Right-handed	Right-arm fast medium	2022	₹75 lakh (US$86,000)	Overseas
25	**Kagiso Rabada**	South Africa	25 May 1995 (aged 27)	Left-handed	Right-arm fast	2022	₹9.25 crore (US$1.1 million)	Overseas
02	**Arshdeep Singh**	India	5 February 1999 (aged 24)	Left-handed	Left-arm medium-fast	2019	₹4 crore (US$460,000)	
28	Vidwath Kaverappa	India	25 February 1999 (aged 24)	Right-handed	Right-arm medium-fast	2023	₹20 lakh (US$23,000)	
12	Raj Bawa	India	12 November 2002 (aged 20)	Left-handed	Right-arm Fast medium	2022	₹2 crore (US$230,000)	

- Source: Punjab Kings

== Administration and support staff ==
Position	Name
CEO	Satish Menon
Team manager	Vikram Hastir
Head coach	Trevor Bayliss
Assistant coach	Brad Haddin
Batting coach	Wasim Jaffer
Spin bowling coach	Sunil Joshi
Fast bowling coach	Charl Langeveldt
Physiotherapist	Andrew Leipus
Strength and conditioning coach	Adrian Le Roux

- Source: Punjab Kings
