= List of Punjab Kings records =

Punjab Kings (abbreviated as PBKS) are a franchise cricket team based in Mohali, Punjab, that plays in the Indian Premier League. Established in 2008, the franchise is jointly owned by Bollywood actress Preity Zinta, Wadia Group scion Ness Wadia, Dabur’s Mohit Burman and Karan Paul. The team plays its home matches at the PCA Stadium. The Punjab Kings' catchment areas are Kashmir, Jammu, Himachal Pradesh, Punjab and Haryana, also evident from the letter sequence "K J H P H" in the banner of the team's logo. Apart from finishing runners-up in the 2014 season when they also topped the league table, the team has made only one other playoff appearance in fifteen seasons.

== Listing criteria ==
In general the top five are listed in each category (except when there is a tie for the last place among the five, when all the tied record holders are noted).

== Listing notation ==
Team notation

- (200–3) indicates that a team scored 200 runs for three wickets and the innings was closed, either due to a successful run chase or if no playing time remained
- (200) indicates that a team scored 200 runs and was all out

Batting notation

- (100) indicates that a batsman scored 100 runs and was out
- (100*) indicates that a batsman scored 100 runs and was not out

Bowling notation

- (5–20) indicates that a bowler has captured 5 wickets while conceding 20 runs

Currently playing

- † indicates a current cricketer

Start Date

- indicates the date the match starts

== Team records ==
=== Team Performance ===
Year	Total	Wins	Losses	No result	Tied and won	Tied and lost	Win %	Position	Summary
2008	15	10	4	0	0	0	66.66%	3rd	Semi-finalists
2009	14	7	7	0	0	0	50.00	5th	Group-Stage
2010	14	4	10	0	1	0	28.57	8th	Group-Stage
2011	14	7	7	0	0	0	50.00	5th	Group-Stage
2012	16	8	8	0	0	0	50.00	6th	Group-Stage
2013	16	8	8	0	0	0	50.00	6th	Group-Stage
2014	17	12	5	0	0	0	70.58	2nd	Runners-Up
2015	14	3	11	0	1	0	27.27	8th	Group-Stage
2016	14	4	10	0	0	0	28.57	8th	Group-Stage
2017	14	7	7	0	0	0	50.00	5th	Group-Stage
2018	14	6	8	0	0	0	42.86	7th	Group-Stage
2019	14	6	8	0	0	0	42.86	6th	Group-Stage
2020	14	6	8	0	1	1	42.86	6th	Group-Stage
2021	14	6	8	0	0	0	42.85	6th	Group-Stage
2022	14	7	7	0	0	0	50.00	6th	Group-Stage
2023	14	6	8	0	0	0	42.85	8th	Group-Stage
2024	14	5	9	0	0	0	35.71	9th	Group-Stage
2025	17	10	6	1	0	0	61.76	2nd	Runners-Up
2026	14	7	6	1	0	0	53.57		
Total	276	126	145	2	3	1	46.90	Runners-Up	
Last Updated: 23 May 2026

=== Team wins, losses and draws ===
Opponent	Matches	Won	Lost	Tied	No Result	Win %
CSK	33	17	16	1	0	51.51
DC	36	18	18	1	0	50.00
GT	8	4	4	0	0	50.00
KKR	36	13	21	0	2	38.23
LSG	7	4	3	0	0	57.14
MI	35	17	17	1	0	50.00
RR	31	12	18	1	0	40.32
RCB	37	18	19	0	0	48.64
SRH	26	8	18	0	0	30.76
DCH^{†}	10	7	3	0	0	70.00
GL^{†}	4	2	2	0	0	50.00
KTK^{†}	1	1	0	0	0	100.00
PWI^{†}	6	3	3	0	0	50.00
RPS^{†}	4	2	2	0	0	50.00
Last updated: 11 May 2026 Note: Tie+W and Tie+L indicates matches tied and then won or lost by super over; The result percentage excludes no results and counts ties (irrespective of a tiebreaker) as half a win; The total matches does not include matches played for Champions League T20; †No longer exists.

== Result records ==
=== Greatest win margin (by runs) ===
Margin	Opposition	Venue	Date
111 runs	Royal Challengers Bangalore	Himachal Pradesh Cricket Association Stadium, Dharamsala, India	17 May 2011
97 runs	Royal Challengers Bangalore	Dubai International Stadium, Dubai, UAE	24 September 2020
76 runs	Mumbai Indians	Punjab Cricket Association Stadium, Mohali, India	10 May 2011
72 runs	Sunrisers Hyderabad	Sharjah Cricket Stadium, Sharjah, UAE	22 April 2014
66 runs	Mumbai Indians	Punjab Cricket Association Stadium, Mohali, India	25 April 2008
Last Updated: 6 October 2020

=== Greatest win margin (by balls remaining) ===
Balls remaining	Margin	Opposition	Venue	Date
73	10 wickets	Delhi Capitals	Punjab Cricket Association Stadium, Mohali, India	30 April 2017
46	8 wickets	Pune Warriors India	Maharashtra Cricket Association Stadium, Pune, India	7 April 2013
42	6 wickets	Chennai Super Kings	Dubai International Cricket Stadium, Dubai, UAE	21 October 2021
37	7 wickets	Delhi Capitals	Punjab Cricket Association Stadium, Mohali, India	25 May 2014
33	8 wickets	Royal Challengers Bangalore	Holkar Stadium, Indore, India	10 April 2017
Last Updated: 7 October 2021

=== Greatest win margins (by wickets) ===
Margin	Opposition	Venue	Date
10 wickets	Delhi Capitals	Punjab Cricket Association Stadium, Mohali, India	30 April 2017
9 wickets	Royal Challengers Bangalore	Punjab Cricket Association Stadium, Mohali, India	12 May 2008
9 wickets	Kolkata Knight Riders	Eden Gardens, Kolkata, India	21 April 2018
9 wickets	Mumbai Indians	M.A.Chidambaram Stadium, Chennai, India	23 April 2021
8 wickets	Kolkata Knight Riders	Eden Gardens, Kolkata, India	4 April 2010
8 wickets	Deccan Chargers	Rajiv Gandhi International Cricket Stadium, Hyderabad, India	16 April 2011
8 wickets	Pune Warriors India	Maharashtra Cricket Association Stadium, Pune, India	7 April 2013
8 wickets	Royal Challengers Bangalore	Holkar Stadium, Indore, India	10 April 2017
8 wickets	Mumbai Indians	Punjab Cricket Association Stadium, Mohali, India	30 March 2019
8 wickets	Royal Challengers Bangalore	Sharjah Cricket Stadium, Sharjah, UAE	15 October 2020
8 wickets	Kolkata Knight Riders	Sharjah Cricket Stadium, Sharjah, UAE	26 October 2020
8 wickets	Gujarat Titans	DY Patil Stadium, Mumbai, India	3 May 2022
8 wickets	Lucknow Super Giants	Ekana Cricket Stadium, Lucknow, India	1 April 2025
Last Updated: 1 April 2025

=== Narrowest win margin (by runs) ===
Margin	Opposition	Venue	Date
1 run	MI	Wankhede Stadium, Mumbai, India	21 May 2008
1 run	DC	New Wanderers Stadium, Johannesburg, South Africa	17 May 2009
2 runs	KKR	Eden Gardens, Kolkata, India	15 April 2012
3 runs	MI	Kingsmead, Durban, South Africa	29 April 2009
4 runs	KKR	Punjab Cricket Association Stadium, Mohali, India	16 April 2013
4 runs	CSK	Punjab Cricket Association Stadium, Mohali, India	15 April 2018
4 runs	DD	Arun Jaitley Stadium, Delhi, India	23 April 2018
4 runs	RR	Wankhede Stadium, Mumbai, India	21 April 2021
Last Updated: 12 April 2021

=== Narrowest win margin (by balls remaining in the second innings) ===
Balls remaining	Margin	Opposition	Venue	Date
0 ball	6 wickets	KKR	St George's Park Cricket Ground, Port Elizabeth, South Africa	3 May 2009
0 ball	4 wickets	DC	Punjab Cricket Association Stadium, Mohali, India	13 May 2012
0 ball	8 wickets	RCB	Sharjah Cricket Stadium, Sharjah, UAE	15 October 2020
0 ball	4 wickets	CSK	M.A. Chidambaram Stadium, Chennai, India	30 April 2023
1 ball	3 wickets	DC	De Beers Diamond Oval, Kimberley, South Africa	9 May 2009
1 ball	4 wickets	RCB	M. Chinnaswamy Stadium, Bangalore, India	2 May 2012
1 ball	7 wickets	PWI	Punjab Cricket Association Stadium, Mohali, India	21 April 2013
1 ball	6 wickets	SRH	Punjab Cricket Association Stadium, Mohali, India	8 April 2019
1 ball	3 wickets	GT	Narendra Modi Stadium, Ahmedabad, India	4 April 2024
Last Updated: 5 April 2024

=== Narrowest win margins (by wickets) ===
Margin	Opposition	Venue	Date
2 wickets	LSG	Ekana Cricket Stadium, Lucknow, India	15 April 2023
3 wickets	DC	De Beers Diamond Oval, Kimberley, South Africa	9 May 2009
3 wickets	GT	Narendra Modi Stadium, Ahmedabad, India	4 April 2024
3 wickets	GT	Maharaja Yadavindra Singh International Cricket Stadium, Mullanpur, India	31 March 2026
4 wickets	DD	Punjab Cricket Association Stadium, Mohali, India	27 April 2008
4 wickets	RCB	M. Chinnaswamy Stadium, Bangalore, India	2 May 2012
4 wickets	DC	Punjab Cricket Association Stadium, Mohali, India	13 May 2012
4 wickets	DD	Arun Jaitley Stadium, Delhi, India	23 April 2013
4 wickets	CSK	M.A. Chidambaram Stadium, Chennai, India	30 April 2023
4 wickets	DC	Maharaja Yadavindra Singh International Cricket Stadium, Mullanpur, India	23 March 2024
4 wickets	CSK	M.A. Chidambaram Stadium, Chennai, India	30 April 2025
Last Updated: 31 March 2026

=== Tied Matches ===
Team 1	Team 2	Venue	Date
CSK	PBKS	M. A. Chidambaram Stadium, Chennai, India	21 March 2010
RR	PBKS	Sardar Patel Stadium, Ahmedabad, India	21 April 2015
PBKS	DD	Dubai International Stadium, Dubai, UAE	20 September 2020
PBKS	MI	Dubai International Stadium, Dubai, UAE	18 October 2020
Last Updated: 19 October 2020

=== Greatest loss margin (by runs) ===
Margin	Opposition	Venue	Date
138 runs	RCB	M. Chinnaswamy Stadium, Bangalore, India	6 May 2015
97 runs	CSK	M. A. Chidambaram Stadium, Chennai, India	25 April 2015
85 runs	RCB	M. Chinnaswamy Stadium, Bangalore, India	6 May 2011
82 runs	DC	Maharashtra Cricket Association Stadium, Pune, India	21 May 2011
82 runs	RCB	M. Chinnaswamy Stadium, Bangalore, India	18 May 2016
Last Updated: 6 October 2020

=== Greatest loss margin (by balls remaining) ===
Balls remaining	Margin	Opposition	Venue	Date
71	10 wickets	RCB	Holkar Stadium, Indore, India	14 May 2018
60	8 wickets	RCB	Maharaja Yadavindra Singh International Cricket Stadium, Mullanpur, India	29 May 2025
57	9 wickets	DD	Brabourne Stadium, Mumbai, India	20 April 2022
48	9 wickets	RPS	Maharashtra Cricket Association Stadium, Pune, India	14 May 2017
41	7 wickets	PWI	DY Patil Stadium, Mumbai, India	10 April 2011
Last Updated: 29 May 2025

=== Greatest loss margins (by wickets) ===
Margin	Opposition	Venue	Date
10 wickets	DD	Newlands, Cape Town, South Africa	19 April 2009
10 wickets	CSK	Punjab Cricket Association Stadium, Mohali, India	10 April 2013
10 wickets	RCB	Holkar Stadium, Indore, India	14 May 2018
10 wickets	CSK	Dubai International Stadium, Dubai, UAE	4 October 2020
9 wickets	CSK	Wankhede Stadium, Mumbai, India	31 May 2008
9 wickets	RR	Sawai Mansingh Stadium, Jaipur, India	7 April 2010
9 wickets	KKR	Barabati Stadium, Cuttack, India	11 May 2014
9 wickets	DD	Arun Jaitley Stadium, Delhi, India	1 May 2015
9 wickets	RPS	Maharashtra Cricket Association Stadium, Pune, India	14 May 2017
9 wickets	CSK	Sheikh Zayed Stadium, Abu Dhabi, UAE	1 November 2020
9 wickets	SRH	M. A. Chidambaram Stadium, Chennai, India	21 April 2021
9 wickets	DD	Brabourne Stadium, Mumbai, India	20 April 2022
Last Updated: 26 April 2022

=== Narrowest loss margin (by runs) ===
Margin	Opposition	Venue	Date
1 run	RCB	Punjab Cricket Association Stadium, Mohali, India	9 May 2016
2 runs	KKR	Sheikh Zayed Stadium, Abu Dhabi, UAE	10 October 2020
2 runs	RR	Dubai International Stadium, Dubai, UAE	21 September 2021
3 runs	MI	Wankhede Stadium, Mumbai, India	16 May 2018
4 runs	MI	Wankhede Stadium, Mumbai, India	29 April 2013
Last Updated: 26 September 2021

=== Narrowest loss margin (by balls remaining) ===
Balls remaining	Margin	Opposition	Venue	Date
0 ball	4 wickets	RPS	Dr. Y.S. Rajasekhara Reddy ACA-VDCA Cricket Stadium, Visakhapatnam, India	21 May 2016
0 ball	3 wickets	MI	Wankhede Stadium, Mumbai, India	10 April 2019
0 ball	6 wickets	GT	Brabourne Stadium Mumbai, India	8 April 2022
0 ball	5 wickets	KKR	Eden Gardens Kolkata, India	8 May 2023
1 ball	5 wickets	DD	Punjab Cricket Association Stadium, Mohali, India	13 March 2010
1 ball	4 wickets	MI	Punjab Cricket Association Stadium, Mohali, India	25 April 2012
1 ball	5 wickets	DD	Maharashtra Cricket Association Stadium, Pune, India	15 April 2015
1 ball	1 wicket	KKR	Eden Gardens, Kolkata, India	9 May 2015
1 ball	6 wickets	GT	Punjab Cricket Association Stadium Mohali, India	13 April 2023
1 ball	4 wickets	GT	Narendra Modi Stadium Ahmedabad, India	3 May 2026
Last Updated: 3 May 2026

=== Narrowest loss margins (by wickets) ===
Margin	Opposition	Venue	Date
1 wicket	KKR	Eden Gardens, Kolkata, India	9 May 2015
3 wickets	KKR	Eden Gardens, Kolkata, India	25 May 2008
3 wickets	KKR	M. Chinnaswamy Stadium, Bangalore, India	1 June 2014
3 wickets	MI	Wankhede Stadium, Mumbai, India	10 April 2019
3 wickets	DC	Himachal Pradesh Cricket Association Stadium, Dharamshala, India	11 May 2026
4 wickets	MI	Brabourne Stadium, Mumbai, India	31 March 2010
4 wickets	MI	Punjab Cricket Association Stadium, Mohali, India	25 April 2012
4 wickets	KKR	Maharashtra Cricket Association Stadium, Pune, India	18 April 2015
4 wickets	RPS	Dr. Y.S. Rajasekhara Reddy ACA-VDCA Cricket Stadium, Visakhapatnam, India	21 May 2016
4 wickets	RCB	M. Chinnaswamy Stadium, Bangalore, India	13 April 2018
4 wickets	RR	Sharjah Cricket Stadium, Sharjah, UAE	27 September 2020
4 wickets	RR	Himachal Pradesh Cricket Association Stadium, Dharamshala, India	19 May 2023
4 wickets	RCB	M. Chinnaswamy Stadium, Bangalore, India	25 March 2024
4 wickets	GT	Narendra Modi Stadium, Ahmedabad, India	3 May 2026
Last Updated: 11 May 2026

== Team scoring records ==
=== Highest Totals ===
Score	Opposition	Venue	Date
265/4	DC	Arun Jaitley Cricket Stadium, Delhi	25 April 2026
262/2	KKR	Eden Gardens, Kolkata, India	26 April 2024
254/7	LSG	Maharaja Yadavindra Singh International Cricket Stadium, New Chandigarh, India	19 April 2026
245/6	SRH	Rajiv Gandhi International Cricket Stadium, Hyderabad, India	12 April 2025
243/5	GT	Narendra Modi Stadium, Ahmedabad, India	25 March 2025
Last updated: 25 April 2026

=== Lowest Totals ===
Score	Opposition	Venue	Date
73	RPS	Maharashtra Cricket Association Stadium, Pune, India	14 May 2017
88	RCB	Holkar Stadium, Indore, India	14 May 2018
88	RCB	M. Chinnaswamy Stadium, Bangalore, India	6 May 2015
92/8	CSK	Kingsmead Cricket Ground, Durban, South Africa	20 May 2009
95/9	CSK	M. A. Chidambaram Stadium, Chennai, India	25 April 2015
Last updated: 6 October 2020

=== Highest totals conceded ===
Score	Opposition	Venue	Date
264/2	DC	Arun Jaitley Cricket Stadium, Delhi	25 April 2026
261/6	KKR	Eden Gardens, Kolkata, India	26 April 2024
257/5	LSG	I. S. Bindra Stadium, Mohali, India	28 April 2023
247/2	SRH	Rajiv Gandhi International Cricket Stadium, Hyderabad, India	12 April 2025
245/6	KKR	Holkar Stadium, Indore, India	12 May 2018
Last updated: 25 April 2026

=== Lowest Totals Conceded ===
Score	Opposition	Venue	Date
67	DD	I. S. Bindra Stadium, Mohali, India	30 April 2017
87	MI	I. S. Bindra Stadium, Mohali, India	10 May 2011
95	KKR	Maharaja Yadavindra Singh International Cricket Stadium, Mullanpur, India	15 April 2025
99/9	PWI	Maharashtra Cricket Association Stadium, Pune, India	7 April 2013
109	KKR	Sheikh Zayed Stadium, Abu Dhabi, UAE	26 April 2014
109	RCB	Dubai International Stadium, Dubai, UAE	20 September 2020
Last updated: 15 April 2025

=== Highest match aggregate ===
Aggregate	Team 1	Team 2	Venue	Date
529/6	DC (264/2)	PBKS (265/4)	Arun Jaitley Cricket Stadium, Delhi	25 April 2026
523/8	KKR (261/6)	PBKS (262/2)	Eden Gardens, Kolkata	26 April 2024
492/8	PBKS (245/6)	SRH (247/2)	Rajiv Gandhi International Cricket Stadium, Hyderabad	12 April 2025
475/10	PBKS (243/5)	GT (232/5)	Narendra Modi Stadium, Ahmedabad	25 March 2025
459/14	KKR (245/6)	PBKS (214/8)	Holkar Stadium, Indore	12 May 2018
Last updated: 25 April 2026

=== Lowest match aggregate ===
Aggregate	Team 1	Team 2	Venue	Date
135/10	DD (67)	PBKS (68/0)	I. S. Bindra Stadium, Mohali, India	30 April 2017
151/11	RPS (78/1)	PBKS (73)	Maharashtra Cricket Association Stadium, Pune, India	14 May 2017
162/7	PBKS (104/7)	DD (58/0)	Newlands Cricket Ground, Cape Town, South Africa	19 April 2009
180/10	PBKS (88)	RCB (92/0)	Holkar Stadium, Indore, India	14 May 2018
190/12	PBKS (106/6)	RCB (84/6)	I. S. Bindra Stadium, Mohali, India	13 May 2015
Last updated: 6 October 2020

== Individual Records (Batting) ==
=== Most runs ===
Rank	Runs	Player	Matches	Innings	Period
1	2,548	KL Rahul	55	55	2018–2021
2	2,477	Shaun Marsh	71	69	2008–2017
3	1,856	David Miller	79	77	2012–2019
4	1,815	Prabhsimran Singh	65	64	2019–2026
5	1,513	Mayank Agarwal	60	59	2018–2022
Last Updated: 23 May 2026

=== Highest individual score ===
Rank	Runs	Player	Opposition	Venue	Date
1	132*	KL Rahul	RCB	Dubai International Stadium, Dubai, UAE	24 September 2020
2	122	Virender Sehwag	CSK	Wankhede Stadium, Mumbai, India	30 May 2014
3	120*	Paul Valthaty	CSK	Punjab Cricket Association Stadium, Mohali, India	13 April 2011
4	115*	Wriddhiman Saha	KKR	M. Chinnaswamy Stadium, Bangalore, India	1 June 2014
5	115	Shaun Marsh	RR	Punjab Cricket Association Stadium, Mohali, India	28 May 2008
Last Updated: 6 October 2020

=== Highest career average ===
Rank	Average	Player	Innings	Not out	Runs	Period
1	56.62	KL Rahul	55	10	2,548	2018–2021
2	52.47	Shreyas Iyer	30	9	1,102	2025–2026
3	44.63	Cooper Connolly	13	2	491	2026
4	44.38	Hashim Amla	16	3	577	2016–2017
5	39.95	Shaun Marsh	69	7	2,477	2008–2017
Qualification: 10 innings. Last Updated: 23 May 2026

=== Highest strike rates ===
Rank	Strike rate	Player	Runs	Balls Faced	Period
1	172.18	Shreyas Iyer	1,102	640	2025-2026
2	162.96	Shashank Singh	836	513	2024–2026
3	156.33	Prabhsimran Singh	1,815	1,161	2019–2026
4	155.32	Glenn Maxwell	1,342	864	2014–2025
5	143.20	Chris Gayle	1,339	935	2018–2021
Qualification= 500 balls faced. Last Updated: 24 May 2026

=== Most half-centuries ===
Rank	Half centuries	Player	Innings	Period
1	23	KL Rahul	55	2018–2021
2	20	Shaun Marsh	69	2008–2017
3	13	Prabhsimran Singh	64	2019-2026
4	11	Shreyas Iyer	30	2025-2026
4	10	Chris Gayle	41	2018–2021
Last Updated: 23 May 2026

=== Most centuries ===
Rank	Centuries	Player	Innings	Period
1	2	Hashim Amla	16	2016–2017
1	2	KL Rahul	55	2018–2021
3	1	Cooper Connolly	9	2026-2026
3	1	Priyansh Arya	24	2025–2026
3	1	Prabhsimran Singh	58	2019–2026
3	1	Shreyas Iyer	30	2025–2026
3	1	Mahela Jayawardene	35	2008–2010
3	1	Paul Valthaty	21	2011–2013
3	1	Adam Gilchrist	34	2011–2013
3	1	Virender Sehwag	25	2014–2015
3	1	Jonny Bairstow	22	2022–2024
3	1	Chris Gayle	41	2018–2021
3	1	Wriddhiman Saha	49	2014–2017
3	1	Mayank Agarwal	59	2018–2022
3	1	Shaun Marsh	69	2008–2017
3	1	David Miller	77	2012–2019
Last Updated: 23 May 2026

=== Most Sixes ===
Rank	Sixes	Player	Innings	Runs	Period
1	110	KL Rahul	55	2,548	2018–2021
2	94	Prabhsimran Singh	64	1,815	2019–2026
3	92	Chris Gayle	41	1,339	2018–2021
4	87	David Miller	77	1,850	2012–2019
5	79	Glenn Maxwell	72	1,342	2014–2025
Last Updated: 23 May 2026

=== Most Fours ===
Rank	Fours	Player	Innings	runs	Period
1	266	Shaun Marsh	69	2,477	2008–2017
2	221	KL Rahul	55	2,548	2018–2021
3	189	Prabhsimran Singh §	64	1,815	2019–2026
4	144	Mayank Agarwal	59	1,513	2018–2022
5	126	David Miller	77	1,850	2012–2019
Last Updated: 23 May 2025

=== Highest strike rates in an inning ===
Rank	Strike rate	Player	Runs	Balls Faced	Opposition	Venue	Date
1	357.14	Jitesh Sharma	25	7	MI	Wankhede Stadium, Mumbai, India	22 April 2023
2	354.54	Priyansh Arya	39	11	CSK	MA Chidambaram Stadium, Chennai, India	3 April 2026
3	344.44	Bhanuka Rajapaksha	31	9	KKR	Wankhede Stadium, Mumbai, India	1 April 2022
4	318.75	KL Rahul	51	16	DD	Punjab Cricket Association Stadium, Mohali, India	8 April 2018
5	312.50	Nicholas Pooran	25*	8	RR	Sharjah Cricket Stadium, Sharjah, UAE	27 September 2020
5	312.50	Odean Smith	25*	8	RCB	DY Patil Cricket Stadium, Mumbai, India	27 March 2022
Qualification: Minimum 25 runs. Last Updated: 3 April 2026.

=== Most sixes in an inning ===
Rank	Sixes	Player	Opposition	Venue	Date
1	11	Chris Gayle	SRH	Punjab Cricket Association Stadium, Mohali, India	19 April 2018
2	9	Adam Gilchrist	RCB	Himachal Pradesh Cricket Association Stadium, Dharamsala, India	17 May 2011
2	9	Glenn Maxwell	SRH	Sharjah Cricket Stadium, Sharjah, UAE	22 April 2014
2	9	David Miller	SRH	Rajiv Gandhi International Cricket Stadium, Hyderabad, India	11 May 2015
2	9	Liam Livingstone	DC	Himachal Pradesh Cricket Association Stadium, Dharamshala, India	17 May 2023
2	9	Jonny Bairstow	KKR	Eden Gardens, Kolkata, India	26 April 2024
2	9	Shreyas Iyer	GT	Narendra Modi Stadium, Ahmedabad, India	25 March 2025
2	9	Priyansh Arya	CSK	Maharaja Yadavindra Singh International Cricket Stadium, Mullanpur, India	8 April 2025
2	9	Priyansh Arya	LSG	Maharaja Yadavindra Singh International Cricket Stadium, Mullanpur, India	19 April 2026
Last Updated: 25 April 2026

=== Most fours in an inning ===
Rank	Fours	Player	Opposition	Venue	Date
1	19	Paul Valthaty	CSK	Punjab Cricket Association Stadium, Mohali, India	13 April 2011
2	15	Glenn Maxwell	CSK	Sheikh Zayed Stadium, Abu Dhabi, UAE	18 April 2014
3	14	Mahela Jayawardene	KKR	Eden Gardens, Kolkata, India	4 April 2010
3	14	Hashim Amla	SRH	Punjab Cricket Association Stadium, Mohali, India	15 May 2016
3	14	Shaun Marsh	SRH	Punjab Cricket Association Stadium, Mohali, India	28 April 2017
3	14	KL Rahul	RCB	Dubai International Stadium, Dubai, UAE	24 September 2020
Last Updated: 7 October 2020

=== Most runs in a series ===
Rank	Runs	Player	Matches	Innings	Series
1	670	KL Rahul	14	14	2020 Indian Premier League
2	641	KL Rahul	14	14	2018 Indian Premier League
3	626	KL Rahul	13	13	2021 Indian Premier League
4	616	Shaun Marsh	11	11	2008 Indian Premier League
5	604	Shreyas Iyer †	17	17	2025 Indian Premier League
Last Updated: 8 June 2025

=== Most ducks ===
Rank	Ducks	Player	Matches	Innings	Period
1	10	Glenn Maxwell	66	63	2014–2025
2	7	Piyush Chawla	87	52	2008–2013
2	7	Mandeep Singh	62	58	2011–2020
4	5	Ravichandran Ashwin	28	15	2018–2019
4	5	Nicholas Pooran	33	31	2019–2021
4	5	Prabhsimran Singh	65	64	2019–2026
Last Updated: 23 May 2026

== Individual Records (Bowling) ==
=== Most career wickets ===
Rank	Wickets	Player	Matches	Innings	Runs	Period
1	111	Arshdeep Singh	96	95	3,111	2019–2026
2	84	Piyush Chawla	87	87	2,237	2008–2013
3	73	Sandeep Sharma	61	61	1,699	2013–2022
4	61	Axar Patel	68	67	1,765	2014–2018
5	58	Mohammed Shami	42	42	1,324	2019–2021
Last Updated: 23 May 2026

=== Best figures in an innings ===
Rank	Figures	Player	Opposition	Venue	Date
1	5/14	Ankit Rajpoot	SRH	Rajiv Gandhi International Cricket Stadium, Hyderabad, India	26 April 2018
2	5/25	Dimitri Mascarenhas	PWI	Punjab Cricket Association Stadium, Mohali, India	12 April 2012
3	5/32	Arshdeep Singh	RR	Dubai International Cricket Stadium, Dubai, UAE	21 September 2021
4	4/11	Sam Curran	DD	Punjab Cricket Association Stadium, Mohali, India	1 April 2019
5	4/13	Lakshmipathy Balaji	SRH	Sharjah Cricket Stadium, Sharjah, UAE	22 April 2014
Last Updated: 21 September 2021

=== Best career average ===
Rank	Average	Player	Wickets	Runs	Balls	Period
1	19.87	Harshal Patel†	24	477	294	2024
2	22.72	Azhar Mahmood	29	659	519	2012–2013
3	22.82	Mohammed Shami	58	1,324	962	2019–2021
4	23.36	Ryan Harris	25	584	462	2011–2013
5	23.83	Sandeep Sharma	73	1,740	1,345	2013–2022
Qualification: 250 balls. Last Updated: 4 November 2024

=== Best career economy rate ===
Rank	Economy rate	Player	Wickets	Runs	Balls	Period
1	6.96	Praveen Kumar	31	1,152	992	2011–2013
1	6.96	Ravi Bishnoi	24	606	522	2020–2021
3	7.03	Ramesh Powar	11	415	354	2008–2012
4	7.36	Brett Lee	9	372	303	2008–2010
5	7.40	Yuvraj Singh	14	400	324	2008–2010
Qualification: 250 balls. Last Updated: 7 October 2021

=== Best career strike rate ===
Rank	Strike rate	Player	Wickets	Runs	Balls	Period
1	12.25	Harshal Patel	24	477	294	2024
2	16.53	Kagiso Rabada	41	1010	678	2022–2024
3	16.5	Mohammed Shami	58	1,324	962	2019–2021
4	17.3	Andrew Tye	27	681	468	2018–2019
5	17.89	Azhar Mahmood	29	659	519	2012–2013
Qualification: 250 balls. Last Updated: 24 May 2026

=== Most four-wickets (& over) hauls in an innings ===
Rank	Four-wicket hauls	Player	Matches	Balls	Wickets	Period
1	3	Arshdeep Singh	66	1,388	78	2019-2025
1	3	Andrew Tye	20	468	27	2018–2019
2	2	Yusuf Abdulla	11	209	15	2009–2010
2	2	Sandeep Sharma	61	1,345	73	2013–2022
2	2	Kagiso Rabada	15	336	26	2022–2024
2	2	Yuzvendra Chahal†	10	174	13	2022–2023
4	1	15 Players.				
Last Updated: 30 April 2025

=== Best economy rates in an inning ===
Rank	Economy	Player	Overs	Runs	Wickets	Opposition	Venue	Date
1	1.50	Varun Aaron	2	3	2	DD	Punjab Cricket Association Stadium, Mohali, India	30 April 2017
2	2.00	Praveen Kumar	4	8	0	RCB	M. Chinnaswamy Stadium, Bangalore, India	2 May 2012
3	2.25	Brett Lee	4	9	1	MI	Punjab Cricket Association Stadium, Mohali, India	25 April 2008
4	2.50	Irfan Pathan	4	10	1	RR	Punjab Cricket Association Stadium, Mohali, India	28 May 2008
4	2.50	Praveen Kumar	4	10	2	RR	Sawai Mansingh Stadium, Jaipur, India	14 April 2013
4	2.50	Glenn Maxwell	2	5	1	KKR	Maharaja Yadavindra Singh International Cricket Stadium, Mullanpur, India	15 April 2025
Qualification: 12 balls bowled. Last Updated: 15 April 2025

=== Best strike rates in an inning ===
Rank	Strike rate	Player	Balls	Runs	Wickets	Opposition	Venue	Date
1	3.0	James Hopes	6	2	2	DD	Arun Jaitley Stadium, Delhi, India	17 May 2008
1	3.0	David Hussey	6	2	2	DC	Rajiv Gandhi International Cricket Stadium, Hyderabad, India	8 May 2012
3	3.5	Sam Curran	14	11	4	DD	Punjab Cricket Association Stadium, Mohali, India	1 April 2019
4	4.2	Bhargav Bhatt	17	22	4	MI	Punjab Cricket Association Stadium, Mohali, India	10 May 2011
5	4.5	Odean Smith	18	30	4	MI	Maharashtra Cricket Association Stadium, Pune, India	13 April 2022
5	4.5	Yuzvendra Chahal	18	32	4	CSK	M.A. Chidambaram Stadium , Chennai, India	30 April 2025
Qualification: Minimum 2 wickets. Last Updated: 30 April 2025.

=== Most runs conceded in a match ===
Rank	Figures	Player	Overs	Opposition	Venue	Date
1	1/69	Xavier Bartlett	4	DC	Arun Jaitley Stadium , Delhi, India	25 April 2026
2	1/68	Arshdeep Singh	4	RR	Maharaja Yadavindra Singh International Cricket Stadium, Mullanpur, India	28 April 2026
3	0/66	Mujeeb ur Rahman	4	SRH	Rajiv Gandhi International Cricket Stadium, Hyderabad, India	29 April 2019
4	1/66	Arshdeep Singh	3.5	MI	Punjab Cricket Association Stadium, Mohali, India	3 May 2023
5	1/65	Sandeep Sharma	4	SRH	Rajiv Gandhi International Cricket Stadium, Hyderabad, India	14 May 2014
Last updated:28 April 2026

=== Most wickets in a series ===
Rank	Wickets	Player	Matches	Series
1	24	Andrew Tye	14	2018 Indian Premier League
1	24	Harshal Patel	14	2024 Indian Premier League
2	23	Kagiso Rabada	13	2022 Indian Premier League
3	21	Arshdeep Singh	17	2025 Indian Premier League
4	20	Mohammed Shami	14	2020 Indian Premier League
5	19	S Sreesanth	15	2008 Indian Premier League
5	19	Mohammed Shami	14	2019 Indian Premier League
5	19	Mohammed Shami	14	2021 Indian Premier League
5	19	Arshdeep Singh	14	2024 Indian Premier League
Last Updated:8 June 2025

=== Hat-trick ===
S. No	Bowler	Against	Wickets	Venue	Date	Ref.
1	Yuvraj Singh	RCB	Robin Uthappa (c Simon Katich); Debabrata Das (b); David Hussey (lbw)	Kingsmead, Durban, South Africa	1 May 2009	
2	Yuvraj Singh	DC	Herschelle Gibbs (c Piyush Chawla); Harbhajan Singh (st Kumar Sangakkara); Venugopal Rao (b)	Wanderers Stadium, Johannesburg, South Africa	17 May 2009	
3	Axar Patel	GL	Dinesh Karthik (b); Dwayne Bravo (b); Ravindra Jadeja (c Wriddhiman Saha)	Saurashtra Cricket Association Stadium, Rajkot, India	1 May 2016	
4	Sam Curran	DD	Harshal Patel (c KL Rahul); Kagiso Rabada (b); Sandeep Lamichhane (b)	Punjab Cricket Association Stadium, Mohali, India	1 April 2019	
5	Yuzvendra Chahal	CSK	Deepak Hooda (c Priyansh Arya); Anshul Kamboj (b); Noor Ahmad (c Marco Jansen)	M.A. Chidambaram Stadium, Chennai, India	30 April 2025	
Last Updated: 30 April 2025

== Individual Records (Wicket-keeping) ==
=== Most career dismissals ===
Rank	Dismissals	Player	Matches	Innings	Period
1	48	Wriddhiman Saha	57	57	2014–2017
2	35	KL Rahul	55	44	2018–2021
3	29	Adam Gilchrist	34	34	2010–2013
4	28	Jitesh Sharma†	40	37	2022–2024
5	23	Kumar Sangakkara	37	35	2008–2010
Last updated: 4 November 2024

=== Most career catches ===
Rank	Catches	Player	Matches	Innings	Period
1	36	Wriddhiman Saha	57	57	2014–2017
2	34	KL Rahul	55	44	2018–2021
3	26	Adam Gilchrist	34	34	2010–2013
4	24	Jitesh Sharma†	40	37	2022–2024
5	16	Kumar Sangakkara	37	35	2008–2010
Last updated: 4 November 2024

=== Most career stumpings ===
Rank	Stumpings	Player	Matches	Innings	Period
1	12	Wriddhiman Saha	57	57	2014–2017
2	7	Kumar Sangakkara	37	35	2008–2010
3	4	Jitesh Sharma	40	37	2022–2024
4	3	Adam Gilchrist	34	34	2010–2013
5	2	Prabhsimran Singh	65	25	2019–2026
5	2	Nitin Saini	10	9	2012–2012
Last updated: 23 May 2026

=== Most dismissals in an innings ===
Rank	Dismissals	Player	Opposition	Venue	Date
1	4	Adam Gilchrist	CSK	Himachal Pradesh Cricket Association Stadium, Dharamshala, India	17 May 2012
1	4	Wriddhiman Saha	RPS	Dr. Y.S. Rajasekhara Reddy ACA-VDCA Cricket Stadium, Visakhapatnam, India	21 May 2016
1	4	Wriddhiman Saha	SRH	Rajiv Gandhi International Cricket Stadium, Hyderabad, India	17 April 2017
4	3	Kumar Sangakkara	MI	Punjab Cricket Association Stadium, Mohali, India	9 April 2008
4	3	Kumar Sangakkara	CSK	Himachal Pradesh Cricket Association Stadium, Dharamshala, India	18 April 2010
4	3	Adam Gilchrist	DD	Himachal Pradesh Cricket Association Stadium, Dharamshala, India	15 May 2011
4	3	Adam Gilchrist	RCB	Himachal Pradesh Cricket Association Stadium, Dharamshala, India	17 May 2011
4	3	Wriddhiman Saha	RCB	M. Chinnaswamy Stadium, Bengaluru, India	9 May 2014
4	3	Wriddhiman Saha	KKR	Eden Gardens, Kolkata, India	9 May 2015
4	3	Wriddhiman Saha	RCB	M. Chinnaswamy Stadium, Bengaluru, India	7 May 2017
4	3	Jitesh Sharma	DC	Maharaja Yadavindra Singh International Cricket Stadium, Mullanpur, India	23 March 2024
Last Updated:23 March 2024

=== Most dismissals in a series ===
Rank	Dismissals	Player	Matches	Innings	Series
1	14	Wriddhiman Saha	14	14	2015 Indian Premier League
2	12	Adam Gilchrist	14	14	2011 Indian Premier League
2	12	Adam Gilchrist	13	13	2013 Indian Premier League
2	12	Wriddhiman Saha	17	17	2014 Indian Premier League
2	12	Wriddhiman Saha	14	14	2017 Indian Premier League
2	12	Jitesh Sharma	14	12	2024 Indian Premier League
Last Updated: 4 November 2024

== Individual Records (Fielding) ==
=== Most career catches ===
Rank	Catches	Player	Matches	Innings	Period
1	49	David Miller	79	79	2012–2019
2	30	Mayank Agarwal	60	60	2018–2022
3	29	Glenn Maxwell	69	69	2014–2025
4	26	Shaun Marsh	71	71	2008–2017
5	25	Axar Patel	68	68	2014–2018
Last Updated: 8 April 2025

=== Most catches in an innings ===
Rank	Dismissals	Player	Opposition	Venue	Date
1	4	David Miller	MI	Wankhede Stadium, Mumbai, India	10 April 2019
3	3	Piyush Chawla	RCB	Kingsmead, Durban, South Africa	1 May 2009
3	3	David Hussey	RCB	Himachal Pradesh Cricket Association Stadium, Dharamshala, India	17 May 2011
3	3	Mandeep Singh	DD	Arun Jaitley Stadium, Delhi, India	23 April 2013
3	3	Glenn Maxwell	DD	Arun Jaitley Stadium, Delhi, India	19 May 2014
3	3	David Miller	KKR	Eden Gardens, Kolkata, India	27 May 2014
3	3	Gurkeerat Singh	MI	Dr. Y.S. Rajasekhara Reddy ACA-VDCA Cricket Stadium, Visakhapatnam, India	13 May 2016
3	3	Eoin Morgan	DD	Arun Jaitley Stadium, Delhi, India	15 April 2017
3	3	Martin Guptill	MI	Wankhede Stadium, Mumbai, India	11 May 2017
3	3	Karun Nair	KKR	Eden Gardens, Kolkata, India	21 April 2018
3	3	Manoj Tiwari	RR	Sawai Mansingh Stadium, Jaipur, India	8 May 2018
3	3	Aiden Markram	RR	Dubai International Stadium, Dubai, UAE	21 September 2021
3	3	Sikandar Raza	KKR	Punjab Cricket Association Stadium, Mohali, India	1 April 2023
3	3	Shahrukh Khan	LSG	Ekana Cricket Stadium, Lucknow, India	15 April 2023
3	3	Harpreet Brar	MI	Maharaja Yadavindra Singh International Cricket Stadium, Mullanpur, India	18 April 2024
Last Updated: 18 April 2024

=== Most catches in a series ===
Rank	Catches	Player	Matches	Innings	Series
1	14	David Miller	16	16	2014 Indian Premier League
2	10	David Miller	14	14	2016 Indian Premier League
2	10	Mayank Agarwal	13	13	2022 Indian Premier League
2	10	Shikhar Dhawan	14	14	2022 Indian Premier League
2	10	Xavier Bartlett	9	9	2026 Indian Premier League
3	9	Glenn Maxwell	16	16	2014 Indian Premier League
3	9	Karun Nair	13	13	2018 Indian Premier League
4	8	Mahela Jayawardene	10	10	2009 Indian Premier League
4	8	Ryan Harris	13	13	2011 Indian Premier League
4	8	Shaun Marsh	13	13	2012 Indian Premier League
4	8	David Miller	12	12	2013 Indian Premier League
4	8	George Bailey	17	17	2014 Indian Premier League
4	8	Marco Jansen†	14	14	2025 Indian Premier League
4	8	Priyansh Arya†	17	17	2025 Indian Premier League
4	8	Shreyas Iyer†	14	14	2026 Indian Premier League
Last Updated: 23 May 2025

== Individual Records (Other) ==
=== Most matches ===
Rank	Matches	Player	Period
1	96	Arshdeep Singh	2019–2026
2	87	Piyush Chawla	2008–2013
3	79	David Miller	2012–2019
4	72	Glenn Maxwell	2014–2025
5	71	Shaun Marsh	2008–2017
Last Updated: 23 May 2026

=== Most matches as captain ===
Rank	Matches	Player	Won	Lost	Tied	NR	Win %	Period
1	34	Adam Gilchrist	17	17	0	0	50.00	2011–2013
2	31	Shreyas Iyer	17	12	0	2	54.83	2025–2026
3	30	George Bailey	14	16	0	0	46.66	2014–2015
4	29	Yuvraj Singh	17	12	0	0	58.62	2008–2009
5	28	Ravichandran Ashwin	12	16	0	0	42.85	2018–2019
Last Updated: 23 May 2026

== Partnership Record ==
=== Highest partnerships by wicket ===
Wicket	Runs	First batsman	Second batsman	Opposition	Venue	Date
1st Wicket	183	KL Rahul	Mayank Agarwal	RR	Sharjah Cricket Stadium, Sharjah	27 September 2020
2nd Wicket	206	Adam Gilchrist	Shaun Marsh	RCB	Himachal Pradesh Cricket Association Stadium, Dharamshala	17 May 2011
3rd Wicket	148	Azhar Mahmood	Shaun Marsh	MI	Himachal Pradesh Cricket Association Stadium, Dharamshala	18 May 2013
4th Wicket	128*	Mandeep Singh	David Miller	PWI	Punjab Cricket Association Stadium, Mohali	21 April 2013
5th Wicket	130*	Rajagopal Sathish	David Miller	RCB	Punjab Cricket Association Stadium, Mohali	6 May 2013
6th Wicket	81*	Shreyas Iyer	Shashank Singh	GT	Narendra Modi Stadium, Ahmedabad	25 March 2025
7th Wicket	68	Cooper Connolly	Marco Jansen	SRH	Rajiv Gandhi International Cricket Stadium, Hyderabad	6 May 2026
8th Wicket	57	Ashutosh Sharma	Harpreet Brar	MI	Maharaja Yadavindra Singh International Cricket Stadium, Mullanpur	18 April 2024
9th Wicket	35	Odean Smith	Kagiso Rabada	KKR	Wankhede Stadium, Mumbai	1 April 2022
10th Wicket	55*	Shikhar Dhawan	Mohit Rathee	SRH	Rajiv Gandhi International Cricket Stadium, Hyderabad	9 April 2023
Last Updated: 6 May 2026

=== Highest partnerships by runs ===
Wicket	runs	First batsman	Second batsman	Opposition	Venue	Date
2nd Wicket	206	Adam Gilchrist	Shaun Marsh	RCB	Himachal Pradesh Cricket Association Stadium, Dharamshala	17 May 2011
1st Wicket	183	KL Rahul	Mayank Agarwal	RR	Sharjah Cricket Stadium, Sharjah	27 September 2020
2nd wicket	182	Priyansh Arya	Cooper Connolly	LSG	Maharaja Yadavindra Singh International Cricket Stadium, New Chandigarh	19 April 2026
3rd Wicket	148	Azhar Mahmood	Shaun Marsh	MI	Himachal Pradesh Cricket Association Stadium, Dharamshala	18 May 2013
3rd Wicket	140	Prabhsimran Singh	Shreyas Iyer	LSG	Ekana Cricket Stadium, Lucknow	23 May 2026
Last Updated: 23 May 2026
