= 2025 Punjab Kings season =

Indian Premier League cricket team

Punjab Kings
2025 season
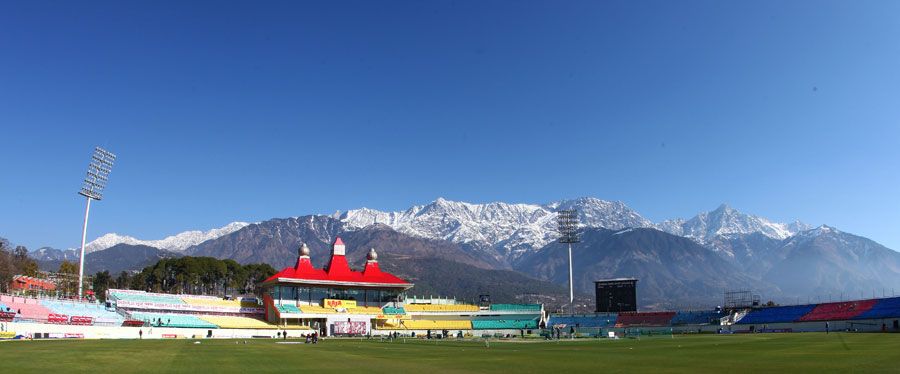
- HPCA Cricket Stadium, secondary home ground of Punjab Kings
- Coach: Ricky Ponting
- Captain: Shreyas Iyer
- Ground(s): Maharaja Yadavindra Singh Stadium, Mullanpur; HPCA Cricket Stadium, Dharamshala
- League stage: 1st place
- Qualifier 1: Lost to Royal Challengers Bengaluru
- Qualifier 2: Won against Mumbai Indians
- Final: Lost to Royal Challengers Bengaluru
- Most runs: Shreyas Iyer (604)
- Most wickets: Arshdeep Singh (21)
- Most catches: Marco Jansen; Priyansh Arya (8 each)
- Most wicket-keeping dismissals: Josh Inglis (10)

The 2025 season was the 18th season for the Indian Premier League (IPL) cricket franchise Punjab Kings. They were one of the ten teams that competed in the 2025 IPL. Ahead of the season, Shreyas Iyer was appointed as the captain. The team was coached by Ricky Ponting.

Punjab Kings finished in first place in the league stage and advanced to Qualifier 1 in the playoffs. The team lost Qualifier 1 to Royal Challengers Bengaluru but won Qualifier 2 against Mumbai Indians to qualify for Punjab's second final. However they lost the final again to Royal Challengers Bengaluru. Captain Iyer scored the most runs (604) while Arshdeep Singh took the most wickets (21) for Punjab in the 2025 season.

== Pre-season ==
The 2025 Indian Premier League was the 18th edition of the Indian Premier League (IPL), a professional Twenty20 (T20) cricket league, organised by the Board of Control for Cricket in India (BCCI). Punjab Kings were one of the four active franchises to not have won the IPL title before 2025. The team finished in ninth place in the previous season. The tournament featured ten teams competing in 74 matches from 22 March to 3 June 2025. Punjab played most of their home matches at Maharaja Yadavindra Singh Stadium with one match played at HPCA Cricket Stadium, except for the last two, which were moved to Sawai Mansingh Stadium following the IPL's suspension and rescheduling.

=== Player retention ===
Franchises were allowed to retain a maximum of six players from their squad, including a maximum of five recent international players. Franchises were required to submit their retention lists before 31 October 2024. Punjab retained two players, but did not retain their prior captain who announced his retirement. (Note: Shikhar Dhawan announced his retirement from IPL in August 2024.)

Retained players
No.	Player	Salary
1	Shashank Singh	₹5.5 crore (US$570,000)
2	Prabhsimran Singh	₹4 crore (US$420,000)

Released players
Batters	Wicket-keepers	All-rounders	Fast bowlers	Spin bowlers
Jitesh Sharma; Shikhar Dhawan; Rilee Rossouw; Harpreet Singh Bhatia; Shivam Singh; Vishwanath Singh; Ashutosh Sharma; Atharva Taide	Jonny Bairstow	Sam Curran; Sikandar Raza; Chris Woakes; Rishi Dhawan; Liam Livingstone	Harshal Patel; Nathan Ellis; Kagiso Rabada; Arshdeep Singh; Vidwath Kaverappa	Harpreet Brar; Tanay Thyagarajan; Rahul Chahar

=== Auction ===
The season's auction took place on 24 and 25 November 2024 in Jeddah, Saudi Arabia. The auction purse for each franchise was set at ₹120 crore (US$12 million), with the franchises being deducted an amount from the purse for each retained player. Punjab had a purse remaining of ₹110.5 crore (US$11 million). Franchises that did not retain six players, were allowed Right-to-Match (RTM) cards at the auction for each player not retained. Punjab had four cards available. Punjab bought twenty-three players in the auction, including twelve capped players and eight overseas players. Punjab used their RTM cards to buy back Arshdeep Singh for ₹18 crore (US$1.9 million).

== Squad ==
- Players with international caps as of the start of the 2025 IPL are listed in **bold**.
- Ages are as of 22 March 2025.
- Withdrawn players are indicated by a dagger symbol (†) and placed at the bottom of the table.

Punjab Kings squad for the 2025 Indian Premier League
S/N	Name	Nationality	Birth date	Batting style	Bowling style	Salary	Notes
2	**Arshdeep Singh**	India	5 February 1999 (aged 26)	Left-handed	Left-arm medium-fast	₹18 crore (US$1.9 million)	
3	**Yuzvendra Chahal**	India	23 July 1990 (aged 34)	Right-handed	Right-arm leg break	₹18 crore (US$1.9 million)	
5	Suryansh Shedge	India	29 January 2003 (aged 22)	Right-handed	Right-arm medium-fast	₹30 lakh (US$31,000)	
9	**Azmatullah Omarzai**	Afghanistan	24 March 2000 (aged 24)	Right-handed	Right-arm medium-fast	₹2.4 crore (US$250,000)	Overseas
12	**Kyle Jamieson**	New Zealand	30 December 1994 (aged 30)	Right-handed	Right-arm medium-fast	₹2 crore (US$210,000)	Overseas; temporary (Note: Punjab Kings signed Kyle Jamieson as temporary replacement, following the IPL's suspension and rescheduling.) replacement (Note: Kyle Jamieson replaced Lockie Ferguson, after the latter withdrew due to hamstring injury.)
13	Harpreet Brar	India	16 September 1995 (aged 29)	Left-handed	Left-arm orthodox	₹1.5 crore (US$160,000)	
15	**Xavier Bartlett**	Australia	17 December 1998 (aged 26)	Right-handed	Right-arm fast	₹80 lakh (US$83,000)	Overseas
16	**Mitchell Owen**	Australia	11 September 2001 (aged 23)	Right-handed	Right-arm medium	₹3 crore (US$310,000)	Overseas; replacement (Note: Mitchell Owen replaced Glenn Maxwell, after the latter withdrew due to finger injury.)
17	**Marcus Stoinis**	Australia	16 August 1989 (aged 35)	Right-handed	Right-arm medium-fast	₹11 crore (US$1.1 million)	Overseas
18	Priyansh Arya	India	18 January 2001 (aged 24)	Left-handed	Right-arm off break	₹3.8 crore (US$390,000)	
19	Nehal Wadhera	India	4 September 2000 (aged 24)	Left-handed	Right-arm leg break	₹4.2 crore (US$440,000)	
27	Shashank Singh	India	21 November 1991 (aged 33)	Right-handed	Right-arm medium-fast	₹4 crore (US$420,000)	
31	Vijaykumar Vyshak	India	31 January 1997 (aged 28)	Right-handed	Right-arm medium-fast	₹1.8 crore (US$190,000)	
46	Praveen Dubey	India	1 July 1993 (aged 31)	Right-handed	Right-arm leg break	₹30 lakh (US$31,000)	
70	**Marco Jansen**	South Africa	1 May 2000 (aged 24)	Right-handed	Left-arm medium-fast	₹7 crore (US$730,000)	Overseas
84	Prabhsimran Singh	India	10 August 2000 (aged 24)	Right-handed	—N/a	₹4 crore (US$420,000)	
95	**Josh Inglis**	Australia	4 March 1995 (aged 30)	Right-handed	Right-arm off break	₹2.6 crore (US$270,000)	Overseas
96	**Shreyas Iyer**	India	6 December 1994 (aged 30)	Right-handed	Right-arm leg break	₹26.75 crore (US$2.8 million)	Captain
97	Musheer Khan	India	27 February 2005 (aged 20)	Right-handed	Left-arm orthodox	₹30 lakh (US$31,000)	
—N/a	Pyla Avinash	India	7 July 2000 (aged 24)	Right-handed	Right-arm medium-fast	₹30 lakh (US$31,000)	
—N/a	Harnoor Singh	India	30 January 2003 (aged 22)	Left-handed	Right-arm leg break	₹30 lakh (US$31,000)	
—N/a	Vishnu Vinod	India	2 December 1993 (aged 31)	Right-handed	—N/a	₹95 lakh (US$99,000)	
—N/a	**Aaron Hardie**	Australia	7 January 1999 (aged 26)	Right-handed	Right-arm medium-fast	₹1.25 crore (US$130,000)	Overseas
—N/a	**Kuldeep Sen**	India	22 October 1996 (aged 28)	Right-handed	Right-arm medium-fast	₹80 lakh (US$83,000)	
—N/a	Yash Thakur	India	28 December 1998 (aged 26)	Right-handed	Right-arm medium-fast	₹1.6 crore (US$170,000)	
32	**Glenn Maxwell** †	Australia	14 October 1988 (aged 36)	Right-handed	Right-arm off break	₹4.2 crore (US$440,000)	Overseas; withdrawn
69	**Lockie Ferguson** †	New Zealand	13 June 1991 (aged 33)	Right-handed	Right-arm medium-fast	₹2 crore (US$210,000)	Overseas; withdrawn

== Support staff ==
Ricky Ponting replaced Trevor Bayliss as head coach while James Hopes replaced Charl Langeveldt as bowling coach.

Position	Name
Head coach	Ricky Ponting
Assistant coach	Brad Haddin
Bowling coach	James Hopes; Sunil Joshi

- Source: Wisden

== League stage ==
Punjab Kings began their season with two wins against Gujarat Titans and Lucknow Super Giants. They lost to Rajasthan Royals, won against Chennai Super Kings, lost to Sunrisers Hyderabad; won against Kolkata Knight Riders and Royal Challengers Bengaluru; and lost to Bengaluru. Their ninth match against Kolkata was abandoned due to rain. Punjab won their next three matches against Chennai, Lucknow and Rajasthan; lost to Delhi Capitals and won against Mumbai Indians; to finish the league stage in first place with nine wins from 14 matches, and advanced to Qualifier 1 in the playoffs.

=== Points table ===
League stage standings
Pos	Grp	Team	Pld	W	L	NR	Pts	NRR	Qualification
1	A	Punjab Kings	14	9	4	1	19	0.372	Advance to Qualifier 1
2	A	Royal Challengers Bengaluru	14	9	4	1	19	0.301	Advance to Qualifier 1
3	B	Gujarat Titans	14	9	5	0	18	0.254	Advance to Eliminator
4	B	Mumbai Indians	14	8	6	0	16	1.142	Advance to Eliminator
5	B	Delhi Capitals	14	7	6	1	15	−0.011	Eliminated
6	B	Sunrisers Hyderabad	14	6	7	1	13	−0.241	Eliminated
7	B	Lucknow Super Giants	14	6	8	0	12	−0.376	Eliminated
8	A	Kolkata Knight Riders	14	5	7	2	12	−0.305	Eliminated
9	A	Rajasthan Royals	14	4	10	0	8	−0.549	Eliminated
10	A	Chennai Super Kings	14	4	10	0	8	−0.647	Eliminated

Source: ESPNcricinfo

=== League progression ===
League progression
Team	Group matches														Playoffs		
Team	1	2	3	4	5	6	7	8	9	10	11	12	13	14	Q1/E	Q2	F
Punjab Kings	2	4	4	6	6	8	10	10	11	13	15	17	17	19	L	W	L

Win	Loss	No result

- Note: The total points at the end of each group match are listed.
- Note: Click on the points (group matches) or W/L (playoffs) to see the match summary.

=== Fixtures ===
Match 5
25 March 2025
19:30 (N)
Scorecard

Punjab Kings; 243/5 (20 overs)	v	Gujarat Titans (H); 232/5 (20 overs)
Shreyas Iyer 97* (42); Sai Kishore 3/30 (4 overs)		Sai Sudharsan 74 (41); Arshdeep Singh 2/36 (4 overs)

Punjab Kings won by 11 runs
Narendra Modi Stadium, Ahmedabad
Umpires: Abhijeet Bengeri (Ind) and Vinod Seshan (Ind)
Player of the match: Shreyas Iyer (Punjab Kings)

- Gujarat Titans won the toss and elected to field.
- Priyansh Arya and Suryansh Shedge (Punjab Kings) made their IPL debuts.

Match 13
1 April 2025
19:30 (N)
Scorecard

Lucknow Super Giants (H); 171/7 (20 overs)	v	Punjab Kings; 177/2 (16.2 overs)
Nicholas Pooran 44 (30); Arshdeep Singh 3/43 (4 overs)		Prabhsimran Singh 69 (34); Digvesh Rathi 2/30 (4 overs)

Punjab Kings won by 8 wickets
Ekana Cricket Stadium, Lucknow
Umpires: Abhijeet Bengeri (Ind) and Vinod Seshan (Ind)
Player of the match: Prabhsimran Singh (Punjab Kings)

- Punjab Kings won the toss and elected to field.

Match 18
5 April 2025
19:30 (N)
Scorecard

Rajasthan Royals; 205/4 (20 overs)	v	Punjab Kings (H); 155/9 (20 overs)
Yashasvi Jaiswal 67 (45); Lockie Ferguson 2/37 (4 overs)		Nehal Wadhera 62 (41); Jofra Archer 3/25 (4 overs)

Rajasthan Royals won by 50 runs
Maharaja Yadavindra Singh International Cricket Stadium, Mullanpur
Umpires: Ulhas Gandhe (Ind) and Kannur Swaroopanand (Ind)
Player of the match: Jofra Archer (Rajasthan Royals)

- Punjab Kings won the toss and elected to field.

Match 22
8 April 2025
19:30 (N)
Scorecard

Punjab Kings (H); 219/6 (20 overs)	v	Chennai Super Kings; 201/5 (20 overs)
Priyansh Arya 103 (42); Khaleel Ahmed 2/45 (4 overs)		Devon Conway 69 (49); Lockie Ferguson 2/40 (4 overs)

Punjab Kings won by 18 runs
Maharaja Yadavindra Singh International Cricket Stadium, Mullanpur
Umpires: Abhijit Bhattacharya (Ind) and Ulhas Gandhe (Ind)
Player of the match: Priyansh Arya (Punjab Kings)

- Punjab Kings won the toss and elected to bat.

Match 27
12 April 2025
19:30 (N)
Scorecard

Punjab Kings; 245/6 (20 overs)	v	Sunrisers Hyderabad (H); 247/2 (18.3 overs)
Shreyas Iyer 82 (36); Harshal Patel 4/42 (4 overs)		Abhishek Sharma 141 (55); Arshdeep Singh 1/37 (4 overs)

Sunrisers Hyderabad won by 8 wickets
Rajiv Gandhi International Cricket Stadium, Hyderabad
Umpires: Keyur Kelkar (Ind) and Akshay Totre (Ind)
Player of the match: Abhishek Sharma (Sunrisers Hyderabad)

- Punjab Kings won the toss and elected to bat.
- Eshan Malinga (Sunrisers Hyderabad) made his IPL debut.

Match 31
15 April 2025
19:30 (N)
Scorecard

Punjab Kings (H); 111 (15.3 overs)	v	Kolkata Knight Riders; 95 (15.1 overs)
Prabhsimran Singh 30 (15); Harshit Rana 3/25 (3 overs)		Angkrish Raghuvanshi 37 (28); Yuzvendra Chahal 4/28 (4 overs)

Punjab Kings won by 16 runs
Maharaja Yadavindra Singh International Cricket Stadium, Mullanpur
Umpires: Mohit Krishnadas (Ind) and Saidharshan Kumar (Ind)
Player of the match: Yuzvendra Chahal (Punjab Kings)

- Punjab Kings won the toss and elected to bat.
- Xavier Bartlett and Josh Inglis (Punjab Kings) made their IPL debuts.

Match 34
18 April 2025
19:30 (N)
Scorecard

Royal Challengers Bengaluru (H); 95/9 (14 overs)	v	Punjab Kings; 98/5 (12.1 overs)
Tim David 50* (26); Marco Jansen 2/10 (3 overs)		Nehal Wadhera 33* (19); Josh Hazlewood 3/14 (3 overs)

Punjab Kings won by 5 wickets
M. Chinnaswamy Stadium, Bengaluru
Umpires: Ulhas Gandhe (Ind) and Virender Sharma (Ind)
Player of the match: Tim David (Royal Challengers Bengaluru)

- Punjab Kings won the toss and elected to field.
- The match was reduced to 14 overs per side due to rain.
- Manoj Bhandage (Royal Challengers Bengaluru) made his IPL debut.

Match 37
20 April 2025
15:30 (N)
Scorecard

Punjab Kings (H); 157/6 (20 overs)	v	Royal Challengers Bengaluru; 159/3 (18.5 overs)
Prabhsimran Singh 33 (17); Krunal Pandya 2/25 (4 overs)		Virat Kohli 73* (54); Arshdeep Singh 1/26 (3 overs)

Royal Challengers Bengaluru won by 7 wickets
Maharaja Yadavindra Singh International Cricket Stadium, Mullanpur
Umpires: Kaushik Gandhi (Ind) and Saidharshan Kumar (Ind)
Player of the match: Virat Kohli (Royal Challengers Bengaluru)

- Royal Challengers Bengaluru won the toss and elected to field.

Match 44
26 April 2025
19:30 (N)
Scorecard

Punjab Kings; 201/4 (20 overs)	v	Kolkata Knight Riders (H); 7/0 (1 over)
Prabhsimran Singh 83 (49); Vaibhav Arora 2/34 (4 overs)		Sunil Narine 4* (3)

No result
Eden Gardens, Kolkata
Umpires: Adrian Holdstock (SA) and Anish Sahasrabudhe (Ind)

- Punjab Kings won the toss and elected to bat.
- No further play was possible due to rain.

Match 49
30 April 2025
19:30 (N)
Scorecard

Chennai Super Kings (H); 190 (19.2 overs)	v	Punjab Kings; 194/6 (19.4 overs)
Sam Curran 88 (47); Yuzvendra Chahal 4/32 (3 overs)		Shreyas Iyer 72 (41); Khaleel Ahmed 2/28 (3.4 overs)

Punjab Kings won by 4 wickets
M. A. Chidambaram Stadium, Chennai
Umpires: Anish Sahasrabudhe (Ind) and Akshay Totre (Ind)
Player of the match: Shreyas Iyer (Punjab Kings)

- Punjab Kings won the toss and elected to field.
- Yuzvendra Chahal (Punjab Kings) took his second hat-trick in IPL.
- Chennai Super Kings were eliminated as a result of this match.

Match 54
4 May 2025
19:30 (N)
Scorecard

Punjab Kings (H); 236/5 (20 overs)	v	Lucknow Super Giants; 199/7 (20 overs)
Prabhsimran Singh 91 (48); Akash Singh 2/30 (4 overs)		Ayush Badoni 74 (40); Arshdeep Singh 3/16 (4 overs)

Punjab Kings won by 37 runs
HPCA Cricket Stadium, Dharamshala
Umpires: Parashar Joshi (Ind) and Jayaraman Madanagopal (Ind)
Player of the match: Prabhsimran Singh (Punjab Kings)

- Lucknow Super Giants won the toss and elected to field.

Match N/A
8 May 2025
19:30 (N)

Punjab Kings (H); 122/1 (10.1 overs)	v	Delhi Capitals
Priyansh Arya 70 (34); T. Natarajan 1/4 (1.1 over)

Match abandoned and voided
HPCA Cricket Stadium, Dharamshala
Umpires: Chris Gaffaney (NZ) and Parashar Joshi (Ind)

- Punjab Kings won the toss and elected to bat.
- The match was abandoned midway due to technical and security issues amid the 2025 India–Pakistan crisis.
- After the suspension and rescheduling, it was voided (no points were awarded to the teams) and rescheduled for 24 May as Match 66 at Sawai Mansingh Stadium, Jaipur.

Match 59
18 May 2025
15:30 (D/N)
Scorecard

Punjab Kings; 219/5 (20 overs)	v	Rajasthan Royals (H); 209/7 (20 overs)
Nehal Wadhera 70 (37); Tushar Deshpande 2/37 (4 overs)		Dhruv Jurel 53 (31); Harpreet Brar 3/22 (4 overs)

Punjab Kings won by 10 runs
Sawai Mansingh Stadium, Jaipur
Umpires: Abhijeet Bengeri (Ind) and Chris Gaffaney (NZ)
Player of the match: Harpreet Brar (Punjab Kings)

- Punjab Kings won the toss and elected to bat.
- This match was originally scheduled for 16 May at the same venue, before being rescheduled.
- Mitchell Owen (Punjab Kings) made his IPL debut.

Match 66
24 May 2025
19:30 (N)
Scorecard

Punjab Kings (H); 206/8 (20 overs)	v	Delhi Capitals; 208/4 (19.3 overs)
Shreyas Iyer 53 (34); Mustafizur Rahman 3/33 (4 overs)		Sameer Rizvi 58* (25); Harpreet Brar 2/41 (4 overs)

Delhi Capitals won by 6 wickets
Sawai Mansingh Stadium, Jaipur
Umpires: Parashar Joshi (Ind) and Jayaraman Madanagopal (Ind)
Player of the match: Sameer Rizvi (Delhi Capitals)

- Delhi Capitals won the toss and elected to field.
- This match was originally scheduled for 8 May at the HPCA Cricket Stadium but was abandoned midway and voided before being rescheduled.

Match 69
26 May 2025
19:30 (N)
Scorecard

Mumbai Indians; 184/7 (20 overs)	v	Punjab Kings (H); 187/3 (18.3 overs)
Suryakumar Yadav 57 (39); Arshdeep Singh 2/28 (4 overs)		Josh Inglis 73 (42); Mitchell Santner 2/41 (4 overs)

Punjab Kings won by 7 wickets
Sawai Mansingh Stadium, Jaipur
Umpires: Chris Gaffaney (NZ) and Parashar Joshi (Ind)
Player of the match: Josh Inglis (Punjab Kings)

- Punjab Kings won the toss and elected to field.
- This match was originally scheduled for 11 May at the HPCA Cricket Stadium, before being rescheduled.

== Playoffs ==
=== Bracket ===
Qualifier 1
29 May 2025 – Mullanpur
1	Punjab Kings	101 (14.1 overs)
2	Royal Challengers Bengaluru	106/2 (10 overs)
Eliminator
30 May 2025 – Mullanpur
3	Gujarat Titans	208/6 (20 overs)
4	Mumbai Indians	228/5 (20 overs)

Qualifier 2
1 June 2025 – Ahmedabad
Q1L	Punjab Kings	207/5 (19 overs)
EW	Mumbai Indians	203/6 (20 overs)

Final
3 June 2025 – Ahmedabad
Q1W	Royal Challengers Bengaluru	190/9 (20 overs)
Q2W	Punjab Kings	184/7 (20 overs)

=== Qualifier 1 ===
Qualifier 1
29 May 2025
19:30 (N)
Scorecard

Punjab Kings; 101 (14.1 overs)	v	Royal Challengers Bengaluru; 106/2 (10 overs)
Marcus Stoinis 26 (17); Suyash Sharma 3/17 (3 overs)		Phil Salt 56* (27); Kyle Jamieson 1/27 (3 overs)

Royal Challengers Bengaluru won by 8 wickets
Maharaja Yadavindra Singh International Cricket Stadium, Mullanpur
Umpires: Michael Gough (Eng) and Virender Sharma (Ind)
Player of the match: Suyash Sharma (Royal Challengers Bengaluru)

- Royal Challengers Bengaluru won the toss and elected to field.
- This match was originally scheduled for 20 May at the Rajiv Gandhi Stadium, before being rescheduled.
- Musheer Khan (Punjab Kings) made his T20 debut.
- Royal Challengers Bengaluru qualified for their fourth IPL final after 2009, 2011 and 2016.

=== Qualifier 2 ===
Qualifier 2
1 June 2025
19:30 (N)
Scorecard

Mumbai Indians; 203/6 (20 overs)	v	Punjab Kings; 207/5 (19 overs)
Suryakumar Yadav 44 (26); Azmatullah Omarzai 2/43 (4 overs)		Shreyas Iyer 87* (41); Ashwani Kumar 2/55 (4 overs)

Punjab Kings won by 5 wickets
Narendra Modi Stadium, Ahmedabad
Umpires: Chris Gaffaney (NZ) and Nitin Menon (Ind)
Player of the match: Shreyas Iyer (Punjab Kings)

- Punjab Kings won the toss and elected to field.
- This match was originally scheduled for 23 May at the Eden Gardens, before being rescheduled.
- Punjab Kings qualified for their second IPL final after 2014.

=== Final ===
Final
3 June 2025
19:30 (N)
Scorecard

Royal Challengers Bengaluru; 190/9 (20 overs)	v	Punjab Kings; 184/7 (20 overs)
Virat Kohli 43 (35); Arshdeep Singh 3/40 (4 overs)		Shashank Singh 61* (30); Krunal Pandya 2/17 (4 overs)

Royal Challengers Bengaluru won by 6 runs
Narendra Modi Stadium, Ahmedabad
Attendance: 91,419
Umpires: Jayaraman Madanagopal (Ind) and Nitin Menon (Ind)
Player of the match: Krunal Pandya (Royal Challengers Bengaluru)

- Punjab Kings won the toss and elected to field.
- This match was originally scheduled for 25 May at the Eden Gardens, before being rescheduled.
- Royal Challengers Bengaluru won their maiden title after 18 years.

== Statistics ==
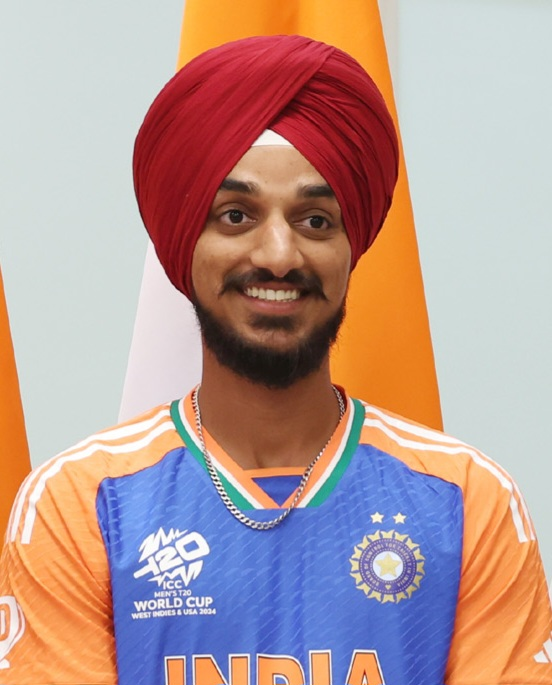
Arshdeep Singh took the most wickets (21) for Punjab Kings in the 2025 Indian Premier League.

Most runs
Runs	Player
604	Shreyas Iyer
549	Prabhsimran Singh
475	Priyansh Arya
369	Nehal Wadhera
350	Shashank Singh

Most wickets
Wickets	Player
21	Arshdeep Singh
16	Marco Jansen
16	Yuzvendra Chahal
10	Harpreet Brar
8	Azmatullah Omarzai
