= 2022 Punjab Kings season =

Indian Premier League cricket team season

Punjab Kings
2022 season
- Coach: Anil Kumble
- Captain: Mayank Agarwal
- Ground(s): Inderjit Singh Bindra Stadium, Mohali
- 2022 Indian Premier League: 6th
- Most runs: Shikhar Dhawan (460)
- Most wickets: Kagiso Rabada (23)

The 2022 season was the 15th season for the Indian Premier League franchise Punjab Kings. They were one of the ten teams to compete in the 2022 Indian Premier League.

== Background ==
The franchise chose to retain two players ahead of the 2022 mega-auction.

Retained
Mayank Agarwal, Arshdeep Singh
Released
KL Rahul, Chris Gayle, Darshan Nalkande, Harpreet Brar, Mandeep Singh, Mohammad Shami, Murugan Ashwin, Nicholas Pooran, Sarfaraz Khan, Deepak Hooda, Ishan Porel, Ravi Bishnoi, Chris Jordan, Prabhsimran Singh, Dawid Malan, Riley Meredith, Jhye Richardson, Shahrukh Khan, Jalaj Saxena, Moises Henriques, Utkarsh Singh, Fabian Allen, Saurabh Kumar
Acquired at the auction
Shikhar Dhawan, Kagiso Rabada, Jonny Bairstow, Rahul Chahar, Shahrukh Khan, Harpreet Brar, Prabhsimran Singh, Jitesh Sharma, Ishan Porel, Liam Livingstone, Odean Smith, Sandeep Sharma, Raj Angad Bawa, Rishi Dhawan, Prerak Mankad, Vaibhav Arora, Writtick Chatterjee, Baltej Dhanda, Ansh Patel, Nathan Ellis, Atharva Taide, Bhanuka Rajapaksa, Benny Howell.

== Squad ==
- Players with international caps are listed in **bold**.

Squad strength: 25 (18 - Indian, 7 - overseas)

No.	Name	Nationality	Birth date	Batting style	Bowling style	Year signed	Salary	Notes
Captain
16	**Mayank Agarwal**	India	16 February 1991 (aged 31)	Right-handed	Right-arm off break	2018	₹12 crore (US$1.3 million)	
Batters
05	Atharva Taide	India	26 April 2000 (aged 21)	Left-handed	Slow left arm orthodox	2022	₹20 lakh (US$21,000)	
35	Shahrukh Khan	India	27 May 1995 (aged 26)	Right-handed	Off break	2022	₹9 crore (US$940,000)	
42	**Shikhar Dhawan**	India	5 December 1985 (aged 36)	Left-handed	Right-arm off break	2022	₹8.25 crore (US$860,000)	Vice Captain
54	**Bhanuka Rajapaksa**	Sri Lanka	24 October 1991 (aged 30)	Left-handed	Right-arm medium	2022	₹50 lakh (US$52,000)	Overseas
All-rounders
12	Raj Bawa	India	12 November 2002 (aged 19)	Left-handed	Right-arm Fast medium	2022	₹2 crore (US$210,000)	
13	Benny Howell	England	5 October 1988 (aged 33)	Right-handed	Right-arm Fast medium	2022	₹40 lakh (US$42,000)	Overseas
15	**Odean Smith**	Jamaica	1 November 1996 (aged 25)	Right-handed	Right-arm medium	2022	₹6 crore (US$630,000)	Overseas
19	**Rishi Dhawan**	India	19 February 1990 (aged 32)	Right-handed	Right-arm Fast medium	2022	₹55 lakh (US$57,000)	
23	**Liam Livingstone**	England	4 August 1993 (aged 28)	Right-handed	Right-arm leg break	2022	₹11.5 crore (US$1.2 million)	Overseas
28	Writtick Chatterjee	India	28 September 1992 (aged 29)	Right-handed	Right-arm Off break	2022	₹20 lakh (US$21,000)	
46	Prerak Mankad	India	23 April 1994 (aged 27)	Right-handed	Right-arm medium	2022	₹20 lakh (US$21,000)	
Wicket-keepers
51	**Jonny Bairstow**	England	26 September 1989 (aged 32)	Right-handed	Right-arm off break	2022	₹6.75 crore (US$700,000)	Overseas
84	Prabhsimran Singh	India	10 August 2000 (aged 21)	Right-handed	-	2022	₹60 lakh (US$63,000)	
99	Jitesh Sharma	India	22 October 1993 (aged 28)	Right-handed	-	2022	₹20 lakh (US$21,000)	
Spin Bowlers
09	Ansh Patel	India	19 February 2002 (aged 20)	Right-handed	Slow left-arm orthodox	2022	₹20 lakh (US$21,000)	
83	**Rahul Chahar**	India	4 August 1999 (aged 22)	Right-handed	Right-arm leg break	2022	₹5.25 crore (US$550,000)	
95	Harpreet Brar	India	16 September 1995 (aged 26)	Left-handed	Slow left-arm orthodox	2022	₹3.8 crore (US$400,000)	
Pace Bowlers
02	Arshdeep Singh	India	5 February 1999 (aged 23)	Left-handed	Left-arm medium-fast	2019	₹4 crore (US$420,000)	
10	Baltej Singh	India	4 November 1990 (aged 31)	Right-handed	Right-arm medium	2022	₹20 lakh (US$21,000)	
14	Vaibhav Arora	India	14 December 1997 (aged 24)	Right-handed	Right-arm Fast medium	2022	₹2 crore (US$210,000)	
25	**Kagiso Rabada**	South Africa	25 May 1995 (aged 26)	Left-handed	Right-arm fast	2022	₹9.25 crore (US$960,000)	Overseas
55	Ishan Porel	India	5 September 1998 (aged 23)	Right-handed	Right-arm medium	2022	₹25 lakh (US$26,000)	
66	**Sandeep Sharma**	India	18 May 1993 (aged 28)	Right-handed	Right-arm medium	2022	₹50 lakh (US$52,000)	
72	**Nathan Ellis**	Australia	22 September 1994 (aged 27)	Right-handed	Right-arm fast medium	2022	₹75 lakh (US$78,000)	Overseas
Source:PBKS Players

== Administration and support staff ==
Position	Name
CEO	Satish Menon
Team manager	Avinash Vaidya
Director of cricket operations & head coach	Anil Kumble
Assistant coach	Jonty Rhodes
Batting consultant	Julian Wood
Bowling coach	Damien Wright
Physiotherapist	Andrew Leipus
Source:PBKS Staff

== Group stage ==
=== Points table ===
Pos	Grp	Team	Pld	W	L	NR	Pts	NRR	Qualification
1	B	Gujarat Titans (C)	14	10	4	0	20	0.316	Advanced to Qualifier 1
2	A	Rajasthan Royals (R)	14	9	5	0	18	0.298	Advanced to Qualifier 1
3	A	Lucknow Super Giants (4th)	14	9	5	0	18	0.251	Advanced to Eliminator
4	B	Royal Challengers Bangalore (3rd)	14	8	6	0	16	−0.253	Advanced to Eliminator
5	A	Delhi Capitals	14	7	7	0	14	0.204	
6	B	Punjab Kings	14	7	7	0	14	0.126	
7	A	Kolkata Knight Riders	14	6	8	0	12	0.146	
8	B	Sunrisers Hyderabad	14	6	8	0	12	−0.379	
9	B	Chennai Super Kings	14	4	10	0	8	−0.203	
10	A	Mumbai Indians	14	4	10	0	8	−0.506	

Source: IPLT20.com
(C) Champions; (R) Runners-up
The four top-ranked teams qualified for the playoffs.

== Group stage fixtures ==
Match 3
27 March 2022
19:30 (N)
Scorecard

Royal Challengers Bangalore; 205/2 (20 overs)	v	Punjab Kings; 208/5 (19 overs)
Faf du Plessis 88 (57); Rahul Chahar 1/22 (4 overs)		Bhanuka Rajapaksa 43 (22); Mohammed Siraj 2/59 (4 overs)

Punjab Kings won by 5 wickets
DY Patil Stadium, Navi Mumbai
Umpires: Yeshwant Barde (Ind) and Nitin Menon (Ind)
Player of the match: Odean Smith (Punjab Kings)

- Punjab Kings won the toss and elected to field.
- Raj Bawa (Punjab Kings) made his T20 debut.
- Bhanuka Rajapaksa and Odean Smith (Punjab Kings) made their IPL debuts

Match 8
1 April 2022
19:30 (N)
Scorecard

Punjab Kings; 137 (18.2 overs)	v	Kolkata Knight Riders; 141/4 (14.3 overs)
Bhanuka Rajapaksa 31 (9); Umesh Yadav 4/23 (4 overs)		Andre Russell 70* (31); Rahul Chahar 2/13 (4 overs)

Kolkata Knight Riders won by 6 wickets
Wankhede Stadium, Mumbai
Umpires: Anil Chaudhary (Ind) and Saiyed Khalid (Ind)
Player of the match: Umesh Yadav (Kolkata Knight Riders)

- Kolkata Knight Riders won the toss and elected to field.

Match 11
3 April 2022
19:30 (N)
Scorecard

Punjab Kings; 180/8 (20 overs)	v	Chennai Super Kings; 126 (18 overs)
Liam Livingstone 60 (32); Chris Jordan 2/23 (4 overs)		Shivam Dube 57 (30); Rahul Chahar 3/25 (4 overs)

Punjab Kings won by 54 runs
Brabourne Stadium, Mumbai
Umpires: Yeshwant Barde (Ind) and Rod Tucker (Aus)
Player of the match: Liam Livingstone (Punjab Kings)

- Chennai Super Kings won the toss and elected to field.

Match 16
8 April 2022
19:30 (N)
Scorecard

Punjab Kings; 189/9 (20 overs)	v	Gujarat Titans; 190/4 (20 overs)
Liam Livingstone 64 (27); Rashid Khan 3/22 (4 overs)		Shubman Gill 96 (59); Kagiso Rabada 2/35 (4 overs)

Gujarat Titans won by 6 wickets
Brabourne Stadium, Mumbai
Umpires: Anil Chaudhary (Ind) and Virender Sharma (Ind)
Player of the match: Shubman Gill (Gujarat Titans)

- Gujarat Titans won the toss and elected to field.

Match 23
13 April 2022
19:30 (N)
Scorecard

Punjab Kings; 198/5 (20 overs)	v	Mumbai Indians; 186/9 (20 overs)
Shikhar Dhawan 70 (50); Basil Thampi 2/47 (4 overs)		Dewald Brevis 49 (25); Odean Smith 4/30 (3 overs)

Punjab Kings won by 12 runs
MCA International Stadium, Pune
Umpires: Ulhas Gandhe (Ind) and Bruce Oxenford (Aus)
Player of the match: Mayank Agarwal (Punjab Kings)

- Mumbai Indians won the toss and elected to field.

Match 28
17 April 2022
15:30 (D/N)
Scorecard

Punjab Kings; 151 (20 overs)	v	Sunrisers Hyderabad; 152/3 (18.5 overs)
Liam Livingstone 60 (33); Umran Malik 4/28 (4 overs)		Aiden Markram 41* (27); Rahul Chahar 2/28 (4 overs)

Sunrisers Hyderabad won by 7 wickets
DY Patil Stadium, Navi Mumbai
Umpires: Rohan Pandit (Ind) and Pashchim Pathak (Ind)
Player of the match: Umran Malik (Sunrisers Hyderabad)

- Sunrisers Hyderabad won the toss and elected to field.

Match 32
20 April 2022
19:30 (N)
Scorecard

Punjab Kings; 115 (20 overs)	v	Delhi Capitals; 119/1 (10.3 overs)
Jitesh Sharma 32 (23); Axar Patel 2/10 (4 overs)		David Warner 60* (30); Rahul Chahar 1/21 (2.3 overs)

Delhi Capitals won by 9 wickets
Brabourne Stadium, Mumbai
Umpires: Tapan Sharma (Ind) and Rod Tucker (Aus)
Player of the match: Kuldeep Yadav (Delhi Capitals)

- Delhi Capitals won the toss and elected to field.
- The match was originally scheduled to take place at the MCA International Stadium in Pune, but it was relocated to the Brabourne Stadium after a number of COVID-19 cases in the Delhi camp.

Match 38
25 April 2022
19:30 (N)
Scorecard

Punjab Kings; 187/4 (20 overs)	v	Chennai Super Kings; 176/6 (20 overs)
Shikhar Dhawan 88* (59); Dwayne Bravo 2/42 (4 overs)		Ambati Rayudu 78 (39); Kagiso Rabada 2/23 (4 overs)

Punjab Kings won by 11 runs.
Wankhede Stadium, Mumbai
Umpires: Marais Erasmus (SA) and Tapan Sharma (Ind)
Player of the match: Shikhar Dhawan (Punjab Kings)

- Chennai Super Kings won the toss and elected to field.

Match 42
29 April 2022
19:30 (N)
Scorecard

Lucknow Super Giants; 153/8 (20 overs)	v	Punjab Kings; 133/8 (20 overs)
Quinton de Kock 46 (37); Kagiso Rabada 4/38 (4 overs)		Jonny Bairstow 32 (28); Mohsin Khan 3/24 (4 overs)

Lucknow Super Giants won by 20 runs
MCA International Stadium, Pune
Umpires: Ulhas Gandhe (Ind) and Michael Gough (Eng)
Player of the match: Krunal Pandya (Lucknow Super Giants)

- Punjab Kings won the toss and elected to field.

Match 48
3 May 2022
19:30 (N)
Scorecard

Gujarat Titans; 143/8 (20 overs)	v	Punjab Kings; 145/2 (16 overs)
Sai Sudharsan 65* (50); Kagiso Rabada 4/33 (4 overs)		Shikhar Dhawan 62* (53); Lockie Ferguson 1/29 (3 overs)

Punjab Kings won by 8 wickets
DY Patil Stadium, Navi Mumbai
Umpires: Rohan Pandit (Ind) and Virender Sharma (Ind)
Player of the match: Kagiso Rabada (Punjab Kings)

- Gujarat Titans won the toss and elected to bat.

Match 52
7 May 2022
15:30 (D/N)
Scorecard

Punjab Kings; 189/5 (20 overs)	v	Rajasthan Royals; 190/4 (19.4 overs)
Jonny Bairstow 56 (40); Yuzvendra Chahal 3/28 (4 overs)		Yashasvi Jaiswal 68 (41); Arshdeep Singh 4/29 (4 overs)

Rajasthan Royals won by 6 wickets
Wankhede Stadium, Mumbai
Umpires: Yeshwant Barde (Ind) and Chirra Ravikanthreddy (Ind)
Player of the match: Yashasvi Jaiswal (Rajasthan Royals)

- Punjab Kings won the toss and elected to bat.
- Mumbai Indians were eliminated as a result of this match.

Match 60
13 May 2022
19:30 (N)
Scorecard

Punjab Kings; 209/9 (20 overs)	v	Royal Challengers Bangalore; 155/9 (20 overs)
Liam Livingstone 70 (42); Harshal Patel 4/34 (4 overs)		Glenn Maxwell 35 (22); Kagiso Rabada 3/21 (4 overs)

Punjab Kings won by 54 runs
Brabourne Stadium, Mumbai
Umpires: Jayaraman Madanagopal (Ind) and Nitin Pandit (Ind)
Player of the match: Jonny Bairstow (Punjab Kings)

- Royal Challengers Bangalore won the toss and elected to field.

Match 64
16 May 2022
19:30 (N)
Scorecard

Delhi Capitals; 159/7 (20 overs)	v	Punjab Kings; 142/9 (20 overs)
Mitchell Marsh 63 (48); Liam Livingstone 3/27 (4 overs)		Jitesh Sharma 44 (34); Shardul Thakur 4/36 (4 overs)

Delhi Capitals won by 17 runs
DY Patil Stadium, Navi Mumbai
Umpires: Sadashiv Iyer (Ind) and Nitin Menon (Ind)
Player of the match: Shardul Thakur (Delhi Capitals)

- Punjab Kings won the toss and elected to field.

Match 70
22 May 2022
19:30 (N)
Scorecard

Sunrisers Hyderabad; 157/8 (20 overs)	v	Punjab Kings; 160/5 (15.1 overs)
Abhishek Sharma 43 (32); Harpreet Brar 3/26 (4 overs)		Liam Livingstone 49* (22); Fazalhaq Farooqi 2/32 (4 overs)

Punjab Kings won by 5 wickets
Wankhede Stadium, Mumbai
Umpires: Anil Chaudhary (Ind) and Nikhil Patwardhan (Ind)
Player of the match: Harpreet Brar (Punjab Kings)

- Sunrisers Hyderabad won the toss and elected to bat.
