= 2024 Punjab Kings season =

2024 Indian Premier League cricket team

Punjab Kings
2024 season
- Coach: Trevor Bayliss
- Captain: Shikhar Dhawan (withdrawn) (Note: Sam Curran was announced as the stand-in captain for the rest of the season, after Shikhar Dhawan withdrew due to Injury.); Sam Curran (stand-in); Jitesh Sharma (stand-in) (Note: Jitesh Sharma was announced as the stand-in captain for their last match of the season, after Sam Curran withdrew due to the upcoming T20WC.)
- Ground(s): Maharaja Yadavindra Singh Stadium, Mullanpur; HPCA Cricket Stadium, Dharamshala
- IPL League: Finished at 9th place
- Most wickets: Harshal Patel (24)
- Most catches: Jonny Bairstow (7)
- Most wicket-keeping dismissals: Jitesh Sharma (12)

The 2024 season was the 17th season for the Indian Premier League franchise Punjab Kings. They were one of the ten teams competed in the 2024 Indian Premier League. They finished at the 8th place in previous season's League stage.

After their 8th loss on 9 May 2024, Punjab was eliminated from the 2024 Indian Premier League. They finished the League stage at the 9th place with 5 wins and 9 losses, garnering 10 points.

Harshal Patel took the most wickets in the season (24) and was awarded with ₹10 lakh (US$13,000) cash prize along with the Purple Cap.

The Punjab Kings drew an average home attendance of 31,482 in the IPL in 2024.

== Squad ==
- Source: ESPNcricinfo
- Players with international caps are listed in **bold**.
- * denotes a player who was unavailable for rest of the season.

Punjab Kings squad for the 2024 Indian Premier League
No.	Name	Nat	Birth date	Batting style	Bowling style	Signed year	Salary	Notes
Captain
42	**Shikhar Dhawan**	(India)	5 December 1985 (aged 38)	Left-handed	Right-arm off break	2022	₹8.25 crore (US$980,000)	Withdrawn
58	**Sam Curran**	(England)	3 June 1998 (aged 25)	Left-handed	Left-arm medium-fast	2023	₹18.5 crore (US$2.2 million)	Overseas; Vice Captain; Withdrawn (Note: English cricketers (including Sam Curran and Jonny Bairstow) withdrew on 18 May 2024 due to the upcoming T20WC.)
99	**Jitesh Sharma**	(India)	22 October 1993 (aged 30)	Right-handed	—	2022	₹20 lakh (US$24,000)	Stand-in
Batters
9	**Rilee Rossouw**	(South Africa)	9 October 1989 (aged 34)	Left-handed	Right-arm Off spin	2024	₹8 crore (US$950,000)	Overseas
5	Harpreet Singh Bhatia	(India)	11 August 1991 (aged 32)	Left-handed	Right-arm medium	2023	₹40 lakh (US$47,000)	
3	Shivam Singh	(India)	18 November 1996 (aged 27)	Right-handed	Right-arm Off spin	2023	₹20 lakh (US$24,000)	
—	Vishwanath Singh	(India)	18 June 1998 (aged 25)	Right-handed	Right-arm Off spin	2024	₹20 lakh (US$24,000)	
77	Ashutosh Sharma	(India)	15 September 1998 (aged 25)	Right-handed	Right-arm Medium-fast	2024	₹20 lakh (US$24,000)	
14	Atharva Taide	(India)	26 April 2000 (aged 23)	Left-handed	Slow left arm orthodox	2022	₹20 lakh (US$24,000)	
Wicket-keepers
51	**Jonny Bairstow**	(England)	26 September 1989 (aged 34)	Right-handed	Right-arm off spin	2022	₹6.75 crore (US$800,000)	Overseas; Withdrawn
84	Prabhsimran Singh	(India)	10 August 2000 (aged 23)	Right-handed	—	2022	₹60 lakh (US$71,000)	
All-rounders
24	**Sikandar Raza**	(Zimbabwe)	24 April 1986 (aged 37)	Right-handed	Right-arm off spin	2022	₹50 lakh (US$59,000)	Overseas; Withdrawn (Note: Sikander Raza withdrew due to National duty.)
—	**Chris Woakes**	(England)	2 March 1989 (aged 35)	Right-handed	Right-arm fast-medium	2024	₹4.20 crore (US$500,000)	Overseas
19	**Rishi Dhawan**	(India)	19 February 1990 (aged 34)	Right-handed	Right-arm medium-fast	2022	₹55 lakh (US$65,000)	
27	Shashank Singh	(India)	21 November 1991 (aged 32)	Right-handed	Right-arm Medium-fast	2024	₹20 lakh (US$24,000)	
23	**Liam Livingstone**	(England)	4 August 1993 (aged 30)	Right-handed	Right-arm leg break	2022	₹11.5 crore (US$1.4 million)	Overseas; Withdrawn (Note: English cricketers (including Liam Livingstone) withdrew on 13 May 2024 due to the upcoming T20WC.)
Pace bowlers
16	**Harshal Patel**	(India)	23 November 1990 (aged 33)	Right-handed	Right-arm medium-fast	2024	₹11.75 crore (US$1.4 million)	
72	**Nathan Ellis**	(Australia)	22 September 1994 (aged 29)	Right-handed	Right-arm fast medium	2022	₹75 lakh (US$89,000)	Overseas
25	**Kagiso Rabada**	(South Africa)	25 May 1995 (aged 28)	Left-handed	Right-arm fast	2022	₹9.25 crore (US$1.1 million)	Overseas; Withdrawn (Note: Kagiso Rabada withdrew due to Injury.)
2	**Arshdeep Singh**	(India)	5 February 1999 (aged 25)	Left-handed	Left-arm medium-fast	2019	₹4 crore (US$470,000)	
28	Vidwath Kaverappa	(India)	25 February 1999 (aged 25)	Right-handed	Right-arm medium-fast	2023	₹20 lakh (US$24,000)	
Spin bowlers
95	Harpreet Brar	(India)	16 September 1995 (aged 28)	Left-handed	Slow left-arm orthodox	2022	₹3.8 crore (US$450,000)	
—	Tanay Thyagarajan	(India)	15 November 1995 (aged 28)	Left-handed	Slow left-arm orthodox	2024	₹20 lakh (US$24,000)	
1	**Rahul Chahar**	(India)	4 August 1999 (aged 24)	Right-handed	Right-arm leg break	2022	₹5.25 crore (US$620,000)	
—	Prince Choudhary	(India)	29 September 1999 (aged 24)	Right-handed	Right-arm leg break	2024	₹20 lakh (US$24,000)	

== Administration and support staff ==
Position	Name
CEO	
Team manager	
Head coach	Trevor Bayliss
Batting coach	Brad Haddin
Bowling coach	Trevor Gonsalves
Fielding coach	

== Sponsors ==
- Kit manufacturer:
- Main shirt sponsor: Dream11
- Back shirt sponsor: BKT
- Chest branding: Kent RO

== League stage ==
=== Points table ===
Pos	Grp	Team	Pld	W	L	NR	Pts	NRR	Qualification
1	A	Kolkata Knight Riders (C)	14	9	3	2	20	1.428	Advanced to Qualifier 1
2	B	Sunrisers Hyderabad (R)	14	8	5	1	17	0.414	Advanced to Qualifier 1
3	A	Rajasthan Royals (3rd)	14	8	5	1	17	0.273	Advanced to Eliminator
4	B	Royal Challengers Bengaluru (4th)	14	7	7	0	14	0.459	Advanced to Eliminator
5	B	Chennai Super Kings	14	7	7	0	14	0.392	Eliminated
6	A	Delhi Capitals	14	7	7	0	14	−0.377	Eliminated
7	A	Lucknow Super Giants	14	7	7	0	14	−0.667	Eliminated
8	B	Gujarat Titans	14	5	7	2	12	−1.063	Eliminated
9	B	Punjab Kings	14	5	9	0	10	−0.353	Eliminated
10	A	Mumbai Indians	14	4	10	0	8	−0.318	Eliminated

Source: ESPNcricinfo
(C) Champions; (R) Runners-up

=== League progression ===
League progression
Team	Group matches														Playoffs		
Team	1	2	3	4	5	6	7	8	9	10	11	12	13	14	Q1/E	Q2	F
Punjab Kings	2	2	2	4	4	4	4	4	6	8	8	8	10	10			

Win	Loss	No result

- Note: The total points at the end of each group match are listed.
- Note: Click on the points (group matches) or W/L (playoffs) to see the match summary.

=== Fixtures and results ===
Match 2
23 March 2024
15:30 (D/N)
Scorecard

Delhi Capitals; 174/9 (20 overs)	v	Punjab Kings (H); 177/6 (19.2 overs)
Shai Hope 33 (25); Arshdeep Singh 2/28 (4 overs)		Sam Curran 63 (47); Kuldeep Yadav 2/20 (4 overs)

Punjab Kings won by 4 wickets
Maharaja Yadavindra Singh International Cricket Stadium, Mullanpur
Umpires: Jayaraman Madanagopal (Ind) and Nikhil Patwardhan (Ind)
Player of the match: Sam Curran (Punjab Kings)

- Punjab Kings won the toss and elected to field.
- This was the first IPL match played at this venue.

Match 6
25 March 2024
19:30 (N)
Scorecard

Punjab Kings; 176/6 (20 overs)	v	Royal Challengers Bengaluru (H); 178/6 (19.2 overs)
Shikhar Dhawan 45 (37); Mohammed Siraj 2/26 (4 overs)		Virat Kohli 77 (49); Harpreet Brar 2/13 (4 overs)

Royal Challengers Bengaluru won by 4 wickets
M. Chinnaswamy Stadium, Bengaluru
Umpires: Anil Chaudhary (Ind) and Saidharshan Kumar (Ind)
Player of the match: Virat Kohli (Royal Challengers Bengaluru)

- Royal Challengers Bengaluru won the toss and elected to field.

Match 11
30 March 2024
19:30 (N)
Scorecard

(H) Lucknow Super Giants; 199/8 (20 overs)	v	Punjab Kings; 178/5 (20 overs)
Quinton de Kock 54 (38); Sam Curran 3/28 (4 overs)		Shikhar Dhawan 70 (50); Mayank Yadav 3/27 (4 overs)

Lucknow Super Giants won by 21 runs
BRSABV Ekana Cricket Stadium, Lucknow
Umpires: Jayaraman Madanagopal (Ind) and Navdeep Singh (Ind)
Player of the match: Mayank Yadav (Lucknow Super Giants)

- Lucknow Super Giants won the toss and elected to bat.

Match 17
4 April 2024
19:30 (N)
Scorecard

(H) Gujarat Titans; 199/4 (20 overs)	v	Punjab Kings; 200/7 (19.5 overs)
Shubman Gill 89* (48); Kagiso Rabada 2/44 (4 overs)		Shashank Singh 61* (29); Noor Ahmad 2/32 (4 overs)

Punjab Kings won by 3 wickets
Narendra Modi Stadium, Ahmedabad
Umpires: Vineet Kulkarni (Ind) and Nitin Menon (Ind)
Player of the match: Shashank Singh (Punjab Kings)

- Punjab Kings won the toss and elected to field.

Match 23
9 April 2024
19:30 (N)
Scorecard

Sunrisers Hyderabad; 182/9 (20 overs)	v	Punjab Kings (H); 180/6 (20 overs)
Nitish Kumar Reddy 64 (37); Arshdeep Singh 4/29 (4 overs)		Shashank Singh 46* (25); Bhuvneshwar Kumar 2/32 (4 overs)

Sunrisers Hyderabad won by 2 runs
Maharaja Yadavindra Singh International Cricket Stadium, Mullanpur
Umpires: Nikhil Patwardhan (Ind) and Navdeep Singh (Ind)
Player of the match: Nitish Kumar Reddy (Sunrisers Hyderabad)

- Punjab Kings won the toss and elected to field.

Match 27
13 April 2024
19:30 (N)
Scorecard

(H) Punjab Kings; 147/8 (20 overs)	v	Rajasthan Royals; 152/7 (19.5 overs)
Ashutosh Sharma 31 (16); Keshav Maharaj 2/23 (4 overs)		Yashasvi Jaiswal 39 (28); Kagiso Rabada 2/18 (4 overs)

Rajasthan Royals won by 3 wickets
Maharaja Yadavindra Singh International Cricket Stadium, Mullanpur
Umpires: Anil Chaudhary (Ind) and Tapan Sharma (Ind)
Player of the match: Shimron Hetmyer (Rajasthan Royals)

- Rajasthan Royals won the toss and elected to field.

Match 33
18 April 2024
19:30 (N)
Scorecard

Mumbai Indians; 192/7 (20 overs)	v	Punjab Kings (H); 183 (19.1 overs)
Suryakumar Yadav 78 (53); Harshal Patel 3/31 (4 overs)		Ashutosh Sharma 61 (28); Jasprit Bumrah 3/21 (4 overs)

Mumbai Indians won by 9 runs
Maharaja Yadavindra Singh International Cricket Stadium, Mullanpur
Umpires: Nand Kishore (Ind) and Vineet Kulkarni (Ind)
Player of the match: Jasprit Bumrah (Mumbai Indians)

- Punjab Kings won the toss and elected to field.

Match 37
21 April 2024
19:30 (N)
Scorecard

(H) Punjab Kings; 142 (20 overs)	v	Gujarat Titans; 146/7 (19.1 overs)
Prabhsimran Singh 35 (21); R. Sai Kishore 4/33 (4 overs)		Rahul Tewatia 36* (18); Harshal Patel 3/15 (3 overs)

Gujarat Titans won by 3 wickets
Maharaja Yadavindra Singh International Cricket Stadium, Mullanpur
Umpires: Nand Kishore (Ind) and Vineet Kulkarni (Ind)
Player of the match: R. Sai Kishore (Gujarat Titans)

- Punjab Kings won the toss and elected to bat.

Match 42
26 April 2024
19:30 (N)
Scorecard

(H) Kolkata Knight Riders; 261/6 (20 overs)	v	Punjab Kings; 262/2 (18.4 overs)
Phil Salt 75 (37); Arshdeep Singh 2/45 (4 overs)		Jonny Bairstow 108* (48); Sunil Narine 1/24 (4 overs)

Punjab Kings won by 8 wickets
Eden Gardens, Kolkata
Umpires: Yeshwant Barde (Ind) and Anil Chaudhary (Ind)
Player of the match: Jonny Bairstow (Punjab Kings)

- Punjab Kings won the toss and elected to field.
- Punjab Kings made the highest successful run-chase in IPL history, thus breaking the record of Rajasthan Royals (223).

Match 49
1 May 2024
19:30 (N)
Scorecard

(H) Chennai Super Kings; 162/7 (20 overs)	v	Punjab Kings; 163/3 (17.5 overs)
Ruturaj Gaikwad 62 (48); Rahul Chahar 2/16 (4 overs)		Jonny Bairstow 46 (30); Shivam Dube 1/14 (1 over)

Punjab Kings won by 7 wickets
M. A. Chidambaram Stadium, Chennai
Umpires: Saiyed Khalid (Ind) and Virender Sharma (Ind)
Player of the match: Harpreet Brar (Punjab Kings)

- Punjab Kings won the toss and elected to field.

Match 53
5 May 2024
15:30 (N)
Scorecard

Chennai Super Kings; 167/9 (20 overs)	v	Punjab Kings (H); 139/9 (20 overs)
Ravindra Jadeja 43 (26); Rahul Chahar 3/23 (4 overs)		Prabhsimran Singh 30 (23); Ravindra Jadeja 3/20 (4 overs)

Chennai Super Kings won by 28 runs
HPCA Stadium, Dharamshala
Umpires: Nand Kishore (Ind) and Vineet Kulkarni (Ind)
Player of the match: Ravindra Jadeja (Chennai Super Kings)

- Punjab Kings won the toss and elected to field.

Match 58
9 May 2024
19:30 (N)
Scorecard

Royal Challengers Bengaluru; 241/7 (20 overs)	v	Punjab Kings (H); 181 (17 overs)
Virat Kohli 92 (47); Harshal Patel 3/38 (4 overs)		Rilee Rossouw 61 (27); Mohammed Siraj 3/43 (4 overs)

Royal Challengers Bengaluru won by 60 runs
HPCA Stadium, Dharamshala
Umpires: Saiyed Khalid (Ind) and Nitin Menon (Ind)
Player of the match: Virat Kohli (Royal Challengers Bengaluru)

- Punjab Kings won the toss and elected to field.
- Punjab Kings were eliminated from the playoffs as a result of this match.

Match 65
15 May 2024
19:30 (N)
Scorecard

(H) Rajasthan Royals; 144/9 (20 overs)	v	Punjab Kings; 145/5 (18.5 overs)
Riyan Parag 48 (34); Sam Curran 2/24 (3 overs)		Sam Curran 63* (41); Avesh Khan 2/28 (3.5 overs)

Punjab Kings won by 5 wickets
Assam Cricket Association Stadium, Guwahati
Umpires: Saidharshan Kumar (Ind) and Rohan Pandit (Ind)
Player of the match: Sam Curran (Punjab Kings)

- Rajasthan Royals won the toss and elected to bat.

Match 69
19 May 2024
15:30 (D/N)
Scorecard

Punjab Kings; 214/5 (20 overs)	v	Sunrisers Hyderabad (H); 215/6 (19.1 overs)
Prabhsimran Singh 71 (45); T Natarajan 2/33 (4 overs)		Abhishek Sharma 66 (28); Arshdeep Singh 2/37 (4 overs)

Sunrisers Hyderabad won by 4 wickets
Rajiv Gandhi International Cricket Stadium, Hyderabad
Umpires: Nitin Menon (Ind) and Virender Sharma (Ind)
Player of the match: Abhishek Sharma (Sunrisers Hyderabad)

- Punjab Kings won the toss and elected to bat.

== Statistics ==
=== Most runs ===
Runs	Player	Inns	HS	Ave	SR	100s/50s	4s	6s
352	(India) Shashank Singh	13	68*	50.29	166.82	0/2	28	21
298	(England) Jonny Bairstow	11	108*	29.80	152.82	1/0	33	14
270	(England) Sam Curran	12	63*	27.00	123.28	0/2	24	6
263	(India) Prabhsimran Singh	12	54	20.23	156.54	0/1	27	16
187	(India) Ashutosh Sharma	7	61	31.17	170.00	0/1	10	15
Last updated: 15 May 2024, Source: ESPNcricinfo

=== Most wickets ===
- Purple Cap holder

Wkts.	Player	Inns	Ov	Runs	BBI	Ave	Econ	SR	4W	5W
24	(India) Harshal Patel	14	49	477	3/15	19.87	9.73	12.25	0	0
17	(India) Arshdeep Singh	14	46.2	468	29/4	27.52	10.10	16.35	1	0
16	(England) Sam Curran	13	41.0	416	28/3	26.00	10.14	15.37	0	0
11	(South Africa) Kagiso Rabada	11	42.0	372	18/2	33.81	8.85	22.90	0	0
10	(India) Rahul Chahar	8	27.0	236	23/3	23.60	8.74	16.40	0	0
Last updated: 15 May 2024, Source: ESPNcricinfo
