= Mohit Burman =

Indian businessman (born 1968)

- Education: Richmond College
- Occupation: Businessman
- Known for: Chairman of Dabur; Chairman of Aviva Life Insurance Company India; Co-owner of Punjab Kings and Saint Lucia Kings

Mohit Burman (born 1968) is an Indian businessman. He is the chairman of Dabur, an Ayurvedic and FMCG company. A fifth-generation scion of the Bengali Hindu Burman family, he also led the family's acquisition of a majority stake in dry cell battery maker Eveready Industries India and the family's entry into the life insurance sector through Aviva India. A sports enthusiast, he is also promoter and co-owner of the Indian Premier League cricket team Punjab Kings.

== Early life and education ==
After completing his schooling from Highgate School, London, he graduated from Richmond College, in Bachelor of Arts, Business Administration and Economics (Double major: Marketing and General Management) and subsequently completed his Master of Business Administration degree, in Finance from Babson Graduate School of Business, Massachusetts.

In October 2024, the Burman family was ranked 23rd on Forbes list of India’s 100 richest tycoons, with a net worth of $10.4 billion.

== Career ==
Burman started his career with Welbeck Property Partnership London and then joined Dabur Finance Ltd., a company specializing in fund and fee-based financial activities, as Senior Manager. He worked in the group's financial services businesses including asset management, life insurance and pensions by setting up an insurance company with the UK's largest insurance company, Aviva. His family in November 2011 had established a joint venture with Espírito Santo Investment Bank to set up an investment banking company in India.

Burman has also been actively involved in expanding Dabur India's presence in overseas markets, and was involved in the acquisition of Balsara Hygiene and Home Care businesses for Rs. 1.43 billion by Dabur India Ltd. on 27 January 2005.

== Board memberships ==
Mohit also holds board membership of different other companies like Federation of Indian Chambers of Commerce & Industry, Dabur International Limited, Universal Sompo General Insurance Co. Ltd., KPH Dream Cricket Pvt. Ltd (Kings XI), Aviva Life Insurance Company India Limited, Markettopper Securities Pvt. Ltd., Elephant India Advisors Pvt. Ltd., Caterham Cars Pvt. Ltd, H&B Stores Ltd., Espirito Santo Securities India Pvt. Ltd.

== Sports ==
Mohit Burman is one of a group of promoters who have formed the cricket team Punjab Kings. He is also a director and co-Owner of a Caribbean Premier League team Saint Lucia Kings.
