= Mohit Rathee =

Indian cricketer

Personal information
- Born: 13 January 1999 (age 27); Rohtak, Haryana, India
- Batting: Right-handed
- Bowling: Right-arm leg-break
- Role: All-rounder

Domestic team information
- Years: Team
- 2022–present: Services
- 2023: Punjab Kings

Career statistics
Competition	FC	T20
Matches	4	13
Runs scored	138	100
Batting average	17.25	14.28
100s/50s	0/1	0/0
Top score	69	34
Balls bowled	697	268
Wickets	9	9
Bowling average	44.77	39.22
5 wickets in innings	0	0
10 wickets in match	0	–
Best bowling	3/94	2/16
Catches/stumpings	3/–	4/–
- Source: ESPNcricinfo, 20 March 2025

Mohit Rathee (born 13 January 1999) is an Indian cricketer. He is an all-rounder who bats right-handed and bowls leg spin. He plays for Services in domestic cricket, and has appeared for Punjab Kings in the Indian Premier League.

== Early life and style of play ==
Rathi was born on 13 January 1999, in Rohtak, Haryana. He is known for his consistency in line and length and his handy tail-end contributions with the bat.

== Career ==
He made his professional and first-class debut for Services against Jharkhand in 2022–23 Ranji Trophy, on 27 December 2022. He claimed a half century in his debut match, and scored 138 runs along with taking nine wickets in his debut first-class season.

In February 2023, he was bought by Punjab Kings for the 2023 Indian Premier League, for Rs. 20 Lakh. The franchise named him among the five uncapped players to watch out for in IPL 2023. He made his Twenty20 debut for Punjab Kings on 9 April 2022, against Sunrisers Hyderabad. In his debut match, he was involved in an unbeaten 55-run partnership with Shikhar Dhawan, the highest stand for the 10th wicket in IPL history.
