= Satish Menon =

Indian cricketer

Personal information
- Born: 3 October 1969 (age 57); Thrissur, Kerala, India

Satish Menon (born 3 October 1969 in Thrissur, Kerala) is an Indian first class cricketer. He is a right-handed batsman representing Kerala in Ranji Trophy. He played a total of fourteen First class and nine List A matches for Kerala. He is currently the CEO of Punjab Kings.
