= Vidwath Kaverappa =

Indian cricketer

Personal information
- Born: 25 February 1999 (age 27)
- Height: 1.88 m (6 ft 2 in)
- Batting: Right-handed
- Bowling: Right-arm fast-medium
- Role: Bowler

Domestic team information
- Years: Team
- 2022–present: Karnataka
- 2024: Punjab Kings

Career statistics
Competition	FC	LA	T20
Matches	22	18	14
Runs scored	150	29	0
Batting average	8.82	14.50	0.00
100s/50s	0/0	0/0	0/0
Top score	37	19	0
Balls bowled	3,916	874	305
Wickets	82	38	25
Bowling average	21.50	15.81	12.48
5 wickets in innings	5	1	1
10 wickets in match	1	0	0
Best bowling	7/53	5/17	5/11
Catches/stumpings	2/–	1/–	1/–
- Source: ESPNcricinfo, 1 April 2025

Vidwath Kaverappa (born 25 February 1999) is an Indian cricketer. Born in Kodagu and plays for Karnataka in domestic cricket, and Punjab Kings in the Indian Premier League. He is a fast bowler who bowls fast-medium and also bats right-handed.

== Career ==
He made his professional, and first-class debut for Karnataka, against Puducherry, on 3 March 2022. He made his Twenty20 debut for Karnataka, against Maharashtra, on 11 October 2022. He made his List A debut for Karnataka, against Meghalaya, on 12 November 2022.

In February 2023, he was bought by Punjab Kings for the 2023 Indian Premier League season for Rs. 20 Lakh.
