= Ashutosh Sharma (cricketer) =

Indian cricketer (born 1998)

Personal information
- Full name: Ashutosh Rambabu Sharma
- Born: 15 September 1998 (age 28); Ratlam, Madhya Pradesh, India
- Batting: Right-handed
- Bowling: Right-arm medium
- Role: Batter

Domestic team information
- Years: Team
- 2017/18–present: Madhya Pradesh
- 2024: Punjab Kings
- 2025–present: Delhi Capitals
- 2026: Hampshire

Career statistics
Competition	FC	LA	T20
Matches	8	28	62
Runs scored	370	514	1,277
Batting average	28.46	19.76	29.69
100s/50s	1/2	0/3	0/9
Top score	123	75	84
Balls bowled	120	372	63
Wickets	0	16	4
Bowling average	–	22.56	28.75
5 wickets in innings	–	1	0
10 wickets in match	–	0	0
Best bowling	–	5/51	2/22
Catches/stumpings	1/–	11/–	13/–
- Source: ESPNcricinfo, 12 August 2026

Ashutosh Sharma (born 15 September 1998) is an Indian cricketer who currently plays for Railways in domestic cricket having previously appeared for Madhya Pradesh and Delhi Capitals in the Indian Premier League. He is a right-handed batsman. His IPL debut match was on 4 April 2024 against Gujarat Titans.

== Career ==
=== Domestic career ===
Ashutosh made his Twenty20 debut for Madhya Pradesh in the 2017–18 Zonal T20 League on 12 January 2018. He made his List A debut on 16 October 2019, for Madhya Pradesh in the 2019–20 Vijay Hazare Trophy. In October 2023 he broke the record for the fastest to 50 runs by an Indian player in Twenty20 cricket, in 11 balls.

=== IPL career ===
Ashutosh was drafted by the Punjab Kings for IPL 2024 for 20 lakhs. He made his IPL debut on 4 April 2024 vs the Gujarat Titans. During the match, he played a crucial knock of 31 runs off 17 balls as an impact player as Punjab accelerated at the back end of their innings to successfully chase 200. During the 2024 Indian Premier League match against Mumbai Indians, Ashutosh made 61 runs on 28 balls.

He was signed up by the Delhi Capitals for ₹3.80 crore in the 2025 IPL auction. During the team's first match of 2025 IPL against Lucknow Super Giants, he made 66 not out off 31 balls, after coming in to bat when the team was 65/5, and helped Delhi Capitals chase the target of 210.

He played 13 matches for Delhi Capitals in the 18th season of IPL and scored 204 with a strike rate of 160.63, and he also includes a crucial knock against Lucknow Super Giants as an impact player, making 66 not out off 31 balls and helping his team to chase the difficult target.
