= Andrew Leipus =

Australian physiotherapist

Andrew Leipus (born 9 January 1970, Adelaide, Australia) is an APA titled sports and exercise physiotherapist.

Since October 1999, he has worked for the Board of Control for Cricket in India as the physiotherapist of the Indian national cricket team.

Leipus retired from touring at the end of 2004 after over 5 years. He was credited for substantially upgrading the Cricket team's medical conditions and treatment. In addition to improving facilities and treatment options (he legendarily found on his first day that the team's first aid kit did not even have a Band-Aid), he encouraged the team to start strength training in gyms. These training sessions led to a great improvement in the team's fitness level and, eventually, its level of play.

In cricket-crazy India, Leipus became a media fixture whenever key players suffered injuries. Media pressure is said to be one of the reasons Leipus declined to renew his contract. He has since been involved with the Indian Premier League since 2008, winning two titles with Kolkata Knight Riders over 12 seasons and more recently heading up the SSSM department with Punjab Kings for the past six seasons.

Leipus also returned to the BCCI from 2015 to 2017, heading up the National Cricket Academy's Sport Science and Sports Medicine Department as Head Physiotherapist.

He now lives in Ballito, South Africa and owns Move Sports Physio and Rehab, a private practice with a special interest in sports and activity related injuries.
