= Priyansh Arya =

Indian cricketer (born 2001)

Personal information
- Born: 18 September 2001 (age 25); Fatehabad, Haryana, India
- Batting: Left-handed
- Bowling: Right-arm offbreak
- Role: Opening batter

Domestic team information
- Years: Team
- 2021–present: Delhi
- 2025–present: Punjab Kings

Career statistics
Competition	FC	List A	T20
Matches	3	16	46
Runs scored	330	522	1,319
Batting average	82.50	34.80	29.31
100s/50s	1/1	1/4	2/6
Top score	199	101	103
Balls bowled	48	0	6
Wickets	0	0	1
Bowling average	–	–	2.00
5 wickets in innings	0	0	0
10 wickets in match	0	–	–
Best bowling	0/36	–	1/2
Catches/stumpings	0/–	10/–	15/–
- Source: ESPNcricinfo, 23 January 2026

Priyansh Arya Prajapati (born 18 January 2001) is an Indian cricketer who plays for Delhi, Punjab Kings and India A. He is a left-handed opener who bowls occasional off-spin.

Arya gained national attention after smashing six sixes in an over in the Delhi Premier League. Arya made his IPL debut for Punjab Kings on 25 March 2025 against the Gujarat Titans. On 8 April 2025, he made a 39-ball century against Chennai Super Kings, becoming the third-fastest Indian after Yusuf Pathan and Vaibhav Sooryavanshi to score an IPL century.

== Domestic career ==
Arya had a strong start in the Delhi Premier League, scoring 57 runs in 30 balls against Old Delhi 6. He followed this up with 82 runs in 51 balls against Central Delhi Kings, hitting seven sixes.

Arya continued to score runs, with scores of 53 in 32 balls against East Delhi Strikers, 107 in 55 balls against Old Delhi 6, and 88 in 42 balls against Central Delhi.

In a notable match, Arya's team, South, scored 308/5 in 20 overs against North Delhi Strikers. Arya contributed 120 runs in 50 balls, including six sixes in a single over.

Arya's performance earned him a spot in the Delhi squad for the Syed Mushtaq Ali Trophy. He scored 102 runs in 43 balls, with five fours and ten sixes, against Uttar Pradesh.
