= Rahul Chahar =

Indian cricketer (born 1999)

Personal information
- Full name: Rahul Desraj Chahar
- Born: 4 August 1999 (age 27); Bharatpur, Rajasthan, India
- Batting: Right-handed
- Bowling: Right-arm leg break
- Role: Bowler
- Relatives: Deepak Chahar (cousin)

International information
- National side: India (2019–2021)
- Only ODI (cap 237): 23 July 2021 v Sri Lanka
- ODI shirt no.: 28
- T20I debut (cap 81): 6 August 2019 v West Indies
- Last T20I: 8 November 2021 v Namibia
- T20I shirt no.: 28

Domestic team information
- Years: Team
- 2016–present: Rajasthan
- 2017: Rising Pune Supergiants
- 2019–2021: Mumbai Indians
- 2022–2024: Punjab Kings
- 2025: Sunrisers Hyderabad
- 2025–2026: Surrey
- 2026: Chennai Super Kings

Career statistics
Competition	ODI	T20I	LA	T20
Matches	1	6	61	141
Runs scored	13	5	319	264
Batting average	13.00	5.00	9.96	9.42
100s/50s	0/0	0/0	0/0	0/0
Top score	13	5	48	25*
Balls bowled	60	132	2,996	3,027
Wickets	3	7	106	142
Bowling average	18	23.85	24.28	27.40
5 wickets in innings	0	0	4	1
10 wickets in match	0	0	0	0
Best bowling	3/54	3/15	5/24	5/14
Catches/stumpings	0/–	3/–	19/–	48/–
- Source: Cricinfo, 15 August 2026

Rahul Desraj Chahar (born 4 August 1999) is an Indian cricketer who plays for Rajasthan in domestic cricket and Chennai Super Kings in the Indian Premier League. A right-arm leg break bowler, he represented the Indian national team from 2019 to 2021.

== Early and personal life ==
Rahul was born on 4 August 1999 in Bharatpur, Rajasthan, to Desraj Singh Chahar and Usha Chahar. His paternal uncle, Lokendra Singh Chahar is his cricket coach who trained him and his cousin Deepak Chahar together. Rahul started playing cricket at the age of eight after watching his elder cousin Deepak Chahar. He started off as a fast bowler but later realised his actual talent was in spinning the ball. His cousin brother, Deepak is also an Indian international cricketer. His cousin Malti Chahar is a Bollywood actress. Rahul got engaged to his long-time girlfriend Ishani in 2019, got married in 2022, and divorced in 2026.

== Domestic career ==
Rahul made his first-class debut for Rajasthan in the 2016–17 Ranji Trophy on 5 November 2016. He made his List A debut for Rajasthan in the 2016–17 Vijay Hazare Trophy on 25 February 2017.

In February 2017, Rahul was bought by the Rising Pune Supergiant team for the 2017 Indian Premier League for 10 lakhs. He made his Twenty20 cricket debut in the 2017 Indian Premier League on 8 April 2017. In January 2018, he was bought by the Mumbai Indians in the 2018 IPL auction.

Rahul was the leading wicket-taker for Rajasthan in the 2018–19 Vijay Hazare Trophy, with twenty dismissals in nine matches. In October 2018, he was named in India C's squad for the 2018–19 Deodhar Trophy.

In August 2019, Rahul was named in the India Green team's squad for the 2019–20 Duleep Trophy. In February 2022, he was bought by the Punjab Kings in the auction for the 2022 Indian Premier League tournament.

In September 2025, Rahul was signed by Surrey and made his debut on the 24 September against Hampshire in the County Championship, making a career best 8-51, which is also the best for a Surrey debutant.

== International career ==
In July 2019, Rahul was named for India's Twenty20 International (T20I) squad for the series against the West Indies. He made his T20I debut against the West Indies on 6 August 2019. In January 2021, he was named as one of five standby players in India's Test squad for their series against England. The following month, he was added to India's squad ahead of the first Test.

In June 2021, Rahul was named in India's One Day International (ODI) squad for their series against Sri Lanka. He made his ODI debut on 23 July 2021, for India against Sri Lanka. In September 2021, Chahar was named in India's squad for the 2021 ICC Men's T20 World Cup.
