= Jitesh Sharma =

Indian cricketer (born 1993)

Personal information
- Full name: Jitesh Mohan Sharma
- Born: 22 October 1993 (age 33); Amravati, Maharashtra, India
- Batting: Right-handed
- Role: Wicket-keeper-batter

International information
- National side: India (2023–2025)
- T20I debut (cap 109): 3 October 2023 v Nepal
- Last T20I: 19 December 2025 v South Africa
- T20I shirt no.: 6

Domestic team information
- Years: Team
- 2013–2025: Vidarbha
- 2026-present: Baroda
- 2022–2024: Punjab Kings
- 2025–present: Royal Challengers Bengaluru

Career statistics
Competition	T20I	FC	LA	T20
Matches	16	18	56	158
Runs scored	162	661	1,533	3,163
Batting average	18.00	24.48	32.61	27.74
100s/50s	0/0	0/4	2/8	1/12
Top score	35	69	107	106
Catches/stumpings	9/2	56/5	55/11	115/19
Medal record
Men's cricket
Representing India
Asia Cup
Winner	2025 UAE
Asian Games
Gold medal – first place	2022 Hangzhou
- Source: ESPNcricinfo, 20 December 2025

Jitesh Mohan Sharma (born 22 October 1993) is an Indian international cricketer who plays as a wicket-keeper-batter. He represents Vidarbha in domestic cricket and Royal Challengers Bengaluru in the Indian Premier League. Jitesh was a member of the Indian team that won the ACC Emerging Teams Asia Cup and medalled gold at the 2022 Asian Games.

== Domestic career ==
He made his List A debut on 27 February 2014, for Vidarbha in the 2013–14 Vijay Hazare Trophy. He made his first-class debut in the 2015–16 Ranji Trophy on 1 October 2015. He was the leading run-scorer for Vidarbha in the 2018–19 Vijay Hazare Trophy, with 298 runs in seven matches. Jitesh Sharma's international prospects were widened during his excellent 2023 IPL season.

He also appeared with Bhawanipore Club in P. Sen Trophy.

== International career ==
He got his maiden call-up for Indian cricket team in January 2023 against Sri Lanka for T20I series. He made his international debut against Nepal on 3 October 2023 during the 2022 Asian Games. His career looked on to further expand after his call-up for the Australia T20I series in 2023. In the fourth T20I match of that series, he scored 35 runs off 19 balls which is his highest individual score till date and in the fifth and final T20I match, he scored 24 runs off 16 balls. In 2024, he was selected once again for a 3-match home T20I series against Afghanistan. In the first match, he scored 31 runs off 20 deliveries but was out for a duck after facing only 2 deliveries in the next match. In 2025 he was in squad of Asia Cup 2025 and even the emerging nations Asia cup captain of emerging India team. He played in India tour of Australia and did 23 runs in 13 deliveries in third t20i after Sanju Samson was dropped from the team. He was in South Africa tour of India team and in first t20i did 10 runs in 5 deliveries and in 2nd t20i did 27 runs for 17 deliveries Even after all these performances unfortunately for him he was not picked in T20i World Cup 2026 due to change in team combinations by the selectors.
