= Punjab Kings =

Indian franchise cricket team

- Logo since 2021
- League: Indian Premier League

Personnel
- Captain: Shreyas Iyer
- Coach: Ricky Ponting
- Owner: Mohit Burman (48%); Ness Wadia (23%); Preity Zinta (23%); Karan Paul (6%)

Team information
- City: New Chandigarh, Punjab, India
- Founded: 2008 (18 years ago)
- Home ground: PCA Stadium, Mohali, 2008–2023 Maharaja Yadavindra Singh International Cricket Stadium, New Chandigarh 2021–present
- Capacity: 38,000
- Secondary home ground(s): Himachal Pradesh Cricket Association Stadium, Dharamsala
- Secondary ground capacity: 21,500
- Official website: punjabkingsipl.in
T20I kit

The Punjab Kings, also known as PBKS, formerly known as Kings XI Punjab, are a professional Twenty20 cricket team based in New Chandigarh, Punjab, that competes in the Indian Premier League (IPL). The franchise is jointly owned by Mohit Burman, Ness Wadia, Preity Zinta and Karan Paul. The team plays its home matches at the Maharaja Yadavindra Singh International Cricket Stadium, although since the 2010 season, they have played some matches at Dharamshala and Indore. They topped the league table twice, in 2014 Indian Premier League and 2025 Indian Premier League and finished as runners-up both times. In 2014 they lost the finals against Kolkata Knight Riders and in 2025 they lost the finals against Royal Challengers Bengaluru.

The franchise played in the now-defunct Champions League Twenty20 once, in 2014 when they finished as semi-finalists. The team name was changed to Punjab Kings in February 2021. In 2025 IPL auction, the franchise made the second highest-ever bid for a player in the IPL, paying ₹26.75 crore (US$2.9 million) for Shreyas Iyer.

== Franchise history ==
In 2007, the Board of Control for Cricket in India (BCCI) created the cricket tournament the Indian Premier League, based on the Twenty20 format of the game. Franchises for eight cities were made available in an auction held in Mumbai on 20 February 2008. The team representing Punjab was bought by the Dabur group's Mohit Burman (46%), the Wadia group's Ness Wadia (23%), Preity Zinta (23%), and Saptarshi Dey of the Dey & Dey Group (minor stake). The group paid a total of $76 million to acquire the franchise.

As the Kings XI Punjab, the franchise's catchment areas were the regions of Kashmir, Jammu, Himachal Pradesh, Punjab and Haryana—evident from the letter sequence "K J H P H" in the banner of the team's old logo.

=== Expulsion from the IPL and return ===
Following the controversy surrounding the BCCI and Lalit Modi in 2010, the Indian Premier League announced on 10 October 2010 that it had terminated the franchise contracts of Kings XI Punjab and the Rajasthan Royals. The teams announced that they would take legal action to remain in the Indian Premier League. Initially, the team tried to negotiate a solution with the league, but when one could not be reached, they decided to file a legal case in the Bombay High Court. They accused the IPL of getting rid of the two teams so that when the bidding process would start for the 2012 IPL season, the contract would be given to a more lucrative bidder.

The termination order was stayed by the Bombay High Court, and the legal dispute between the BCCI and the franchise ended in 2012.

=== Name change ===
On 17 February 2021, Kings XI Punjab was renamed to Punjab Kings, ahead of the 2021 Indian Premier League. Ness Wadia explained the reason for changing the franchise name was to "relook at things" and rebrand after 13 seasons of the IPL. He expressed his disappointment over the franchise for "not being able to win a title" and expected them to "start afresh" after a name change. He added that the name change had been planned two years ago and COVID-19 had just delayed the announcement.

=== Kit suppliers and shirt sponsors ===
Period	Kit supplier	Shirt sponsor (front)	Shirt sponsor (back)
2008–2009	Provogue	Spice	Kotak
2009–2010	Reebok	Fly Emirates	7up Nimbooz
2010–2011	Reebok	Fly Emirates	Mountain Dew
2011–2012	Reebok	Fly Emirates	Pearls
2012–2013	U.S. Polo Assn.	Videocon d2h	Lux Cozi
2013–2014	TYKA Sports	NVD Solar	Lux Cozi
2014–2015	TYKA Sports	Tata Prima	Arise
2015–2016	TYKA Sports	Tata Prima	Manforce
2016–2017	TYKA Sports	Tata Prima	Idea
2017–2018	TYKA Sports	Hero Cycles	Idea
2018–2019	T10 Sports	Kent RO	Jio
2019–2020	T10 Sports	Aaj Tak	Bageshree Lake City
2020–2021	T10 Sports	EbixCash	Avon Cycles
2021–2024	T10 Sports	EbixCash	BKT
2024–2025	SIX5SIX	Dream11	BKT
2025–2026	T10 Sports	Dream11	BKT
2026–present	SIX5SIX	CP Plus	BKT

=== Captains ===
Last updated: 4 May 2025

Player	From	To	Matches	Won	Lost	Tied	NR	Win%	Best Result
Yuvraj Singh	2008	2009	29	17	12	0	0	58.62	SF (2008)
Kumar Sangakkara	2010		13	3	9	1	0	23.07	5/8 (2010)
Mahela Jayawardene	2010		1	0	1	0	0	0	Stand-In
Adam Gilchrist	2011	2013	34	17	17	0	0	50	5/10 (2011)
David Hussey	2012	2013	12	6	6	0	0	50	Stand-In
George Bailey	2014	2015	30	14	16	0	0	46.66	Runners-up (2014)
Virender Sehwag	2015		1	0	0	1	0	0	Stand-In
David Miller	2016		6	1	5	0	0	16.66	8/8 (2016 First half)
Murali Vijay	2016		8	3	5	0	0	37.5	8/8 (2016 Second half)
Glenn Maxwell	2017		14	7	7	0	0	50	5/8 (2017)
Ravichandran Ashwin	2018	2019	28	12	16	0	0	42.85	6/8 (2019)
KL Rahul	2020	2021	27	10	15	2	0	37.07	6/8 (2020, 2021)
Mayank Agarwal	2021	2022	14	7	7	0	0	50	6/10 (2022)
Shikhar Dhawan	2022	2024	17	6	11	0	0	35.29	8/10 (2023)
Sam Curran	2023	2024	11	5	6	0	0	45.45	Stand-In
Jitesh Sharma	2024		1	0	1	0	0	0	Stand-In
Shreyas Iyer	2025-26		17	10	5	0	1	62.5	Runners-up (2025) 5/10 (2026)

== Team history ==
=== Early IPL seasons (2008–2010) ===
The 2008 tournament got off to a slow start for the Kings XI Punjab, with the team losing their first two games. However, a player of the match performance by Kumar Sangakkara, who scored 94 runs off 56 balls, helped them defeat Mumbai Indians by 66 runs in their third game. Despite the absence of Brett Lee and Simon Katich for parts of the season, the team found its groove, winning nine of its next 10 matches. They clinched a semi-final berth but suffered a nine-wicket loss to the Chennai Super Kings.

Shaun Marsh was the breakout star of the inaugural season. Signed as an uncapped player on 9 April after being overlooked in the auction, he finished as the tournament's first Orange Cap holder. Marsh amassed 616 runs in just 11 innings at an average of 68.44, including one century and five half-centuries.

In 2009, the tournament moved to South Africa due to security concerns in India. The franchise signed a sponsorship deal with Emirates and sought to bolster its bowling by bidding for Jerome Taylor and Yusuf Abdulla. However, Taylor was ruled out due to injury before the season began, and the team struggled with the unavailability of key Australian players. Despite a mid-season resurgence, their semi-final hopes were crushed after a final league match loss to Chennai Super Kings, leaving them in 5th place.

The 2010 season was the team's most difficult of the early era, as they finished in last position (8th) with only four wins. A major highlight was their first-ever Super Over victory against Chennai Super Kings; after both teams tied at 136 runs, Juan Theron restricted Chennai to 9 runs in the tie-breaker, which Yuvraj Singh chased down with a boundary off Muttiah Muralitharan. Mahela Jayawardene was the team's leading run-scorer for the season with 472 runs.

=== Rise of Kings XI Punjab (2011–2014) ===
The 2011 IPL season saw a complete overhaul as the franchise appointed Michael Bevan as coach and Adam Gilchrist as captain. The team narrowly missed the playoffs, finishing fifth on the table after a five-match losing streak mid-season hampered their progress. A standout individual performance came from uncapped opener Paul Valthaty, who scored a century (120*) against Chennai Super Kings, then the highest individual score in the tournament's history.

In 2012, the team finished sixth overall, winning eight of their sixteen matches. Mandeep Singh emerged as a key domestic talent, finishing as the team's leading run-scorer with 432 runs and winning the "Rising Star of the Tournament" award.

The 2013 season was marked by David Miller's historic performance against Royal Challengers Bangalore. Chasing 190, Miller smashed an unbeaten 101 off just 38 balls, the third-fastest century in IPL history at the time. Despite his heroics, the team failed to qualify for the playoffs, and captain Adam Gilchrist retired from all forms of cricket at the end of the season.

The 2014 season was the franchise's most successful. Under new captain George Bailey and coach Sanjay Bangar, the team won all five of their opening matches held in the UAE. Glenn Maxwell was named the tournament's Most Valuable Player (MVP) after scoring 552 runs at a strike rate of 187.75. In the final, Wriddhiman Saha became the first player to score a century in an IPL final (115*), but the team finished as runners-up after Kolkata Knight Riders chased down 200 with three balls to spare.

=== 2014 CLT20 ===
Kings XI Punjab qualified for the 2014 Champions League Twenty20 as they finished runners-up in the 2014 IPL. They were placed in Group B along with the Hobart Hurricanes (Australia), the Barbados Tridents (West Indies), the Cape Cobras (South Africa) and the Northern Knights (New Zealand).

Kings XI's first match was in their home stadium, the PCA Stadium, Mohali where they beat Hobart Hurricanes by five wickets, overhauling Hobart's 144–6 in 17.4 overs. Thisara Perera was named the Man Of The Match with 2–17 and 35* off 20 balls. Glenn Maxwell top scored in the game with 43. They also won the second match beating the Barbados Tridents by four wickets, chasing down 175 with two balls to spare thanks to an unbeaten 46 from David Miller.

They won their third match of the competition against the Northern Knights and qualified for the semi-finals. In this match, they set the record for the biggest win in CLT20 history by 120 runs, after scoring 215/5 fueled by half-centuries from Manan Vohra and Virender Sehwag. They continued to win their final group match against the Cape Cobras by seven wickets to remain unbeaten in the group stage, with Akshar Patel taking 3 for 15.

However, they were knocked out of the tournament at the semi-final stage with a disappointing 65-run defeat against their IPL rivals the Chennai Super Kings. Despite Parvinder Awana taking a hat-trick in the match, the team was bowled out for 117 while chasing 183. The Super Kings went on to win the tournament.

=== Heartbreak (2015–2020) ===
George Bailey continued to lead the team during the 2015 season. The team won just three of the 14 games and finished eighth in the league. David Miller finished the season as top scorer with 357 runs and Anureet Singh was the leading wicket-taker with 15 wickets.

In 2016, David Miller began the season as captain but was replaced by Murali Vijay mid-season due to the team's poor form. The team finished eighth once again with only four wins. Vijay was the top scorer with 453 runs and Sandeep Sharma took 15 wickets.

For the 2017 season, Virender Sehwag joined as head coach and Glenn Maxwell was appointed captain. The team improved significantly but missed the playoffs after a heavy nine-wicket defeat to Rising Pune Supergiant in their final league match, ending in fifth place. Hashim Amla was the standout performer, scoring two centuries during the campaign.

The 2018 season featured a new-look squad with Ravichandran Ashwin as captain and Brad Hodge as coach. KL Rahul made an immediate impact, scoring the then-fastest fifty in IPL history off just 14 balls against Delhi Daredevils. Despite winning five of their first six games, the team collapsed in the second half, winning only one of their final eight matches to finish seventh. Andrew Tye won the Purple Cap for most wickets (24).

In 2019, under head coach Mike Hesson, the team finished sixth. On the auction day (18 December 2018), KXIP snapped up 13 players, including Varun Chakaravarthy for a record ₹8.4 crore. KL Rahul was the highest scorer for the team with 593 runs.

The 2020 season, held in the UAE due to the COVID-19 pandemic, saw KL Rahul take over as captain with Anil Kumble as head coach. The season was a rollercoaster; after losing five consecutive games, Punjab won five in a row, including a historic double-Super Over victory against Mumbai Indians. KL Rahul won the Orange Cap with 670 runs, and his 132* against RCB became the highest score by an Indian in IPL history. They finished sixth after losing their final two matches.

=== Post-Rebranding (2021–2024) ===
In February 2021, the franchise officially rebranded from Kings XI Punjab to Punjab Kings, aiming for a "reset" after years of inconsistent performance. In their first season under the new name, they finished sixth with 12 points. Despite the team's struggles, captain KL Rahul remained prolific, finishing as the league's third-highest run-scorer with 626 runs.

The 2022 season, led by Mayank Agarwal, followed a similar pattern. Punjab finished sixth for the fourth consecutive year, winning seven and losing seven matches with a net run rate (NRR) of +0.126. Liam Livingstone was a standout, scoring 437 runs at a strike rate of 182.08.

In 2023, under captain Shikhar Dhawan, the team finished eighth. Dhawan led the scoring with 373 runs, but the team's playoff hopes were dashed after a late-season loss to Delhi Capitals.

The 2024 season saw the team finish ninth. A historic highlight occurred in Match 42, where Punjab Kings set a world record for the highest successful run chase in T20 history, overhauling Kolkata Knight Riders' 261/6 with eight balls to spare. Shashank Singh (354 runs) and Harshal Patel (24 wickets) were the season's top performers, with Patel winning the Purple Cap.

=== A Season of Redemption (2025) ===
After a major overhaul at the 2025 auction, Punjab Kings appointed Shreyas Iyer as captain and Ricky Ponting as head coach. The team dominated the league stage, finishing first in the standings with 19 points from 9 wins. Shreyas Iyer led the batting charts with 604 runs, while Arshdeep Singh spearheaded the attack with 21 wickets.

In the playoffs, Punjab lost Qualifier 1 to Royal Challengers Bengaluru (RCB) but secured a place in the final after defeating Mumbai Indians in Qualifier 2, where Shreyas Iyer scored a match-winning 87*. In a closely contested final at the Narendra Modi Stadium, RCB posted 190/9. Despite a late charge from Shashank Singh (61*), Punjab fell short by 6 runs, finishing as runners-up for the second time in franchise history.

== Performance record ==
=== Indian Premier League ===
Year	League standing	Final standing
As Kings XI Punjab
2008	2nd out of 8	Semi-finalists
2009	5th out of 8	League stage
2010	8th out of 8	League stage
2011	5th out of 10	League stage
2012	6th out of 9	League stage
2013	6th out of 9	League stage
2014	1st out of 8	Runners up
2015	8th out of 8	League stage
2016	8th out of 8	League stage
2017	5th out of 8	League stage
2018	7th out of 8	League stage
2019	6th out of 8	League stage
2020	6th out of 8	League stage
As Punjab Kings
2021	6th out of 8	League stage
2022	6th out of 10	League stage
2023	8th out of 10	League stage
2024	9th out of 10	League stage
2025	1st out of 10	Runners up
2026	5th out of 10	League stage

== Current squad ==
- Players with international caps are listed in **bold**.
- * denotes a player who is currently unavailable for selection.
- * denotes a player who is unavailable for rest of the season.

No.	Name	Nat	Birth date	Batting style	Bowling style	Year signed	Salary	Notes
Batters
96	**Shreyas Iyer**	(India)	6 December 1994 (age 31)	Right-handed	Right-arm leg break	2025	₹26.75 crore (US$2.9 million)	Captain
18	Priyansh Arya	(India)	18 January 2001 (age 25)	Left-handed	Right-arm off break	2025	₹3.8 crore (US$410,000)	
12	Harnoor Singh	(India)	30 January 2003 (age 23)	Left-handed	Right-arm leg break	2025	₹30 lakh (US$32,000)	
97	Musheer Khan	(India)	27 February 2005 (age 21)	Right-handed	Left-arm orthodox	2025	₹30 lakh (US$32,000)	
Wicket-keepers
4	Vishnu Vinod	(India)	2 December 1993 (age 32)	Right-handed	—N/a	2025	₹95 lakh (US$100,000)	
84	Prabhsimran Singh	(India)	10 August 2000 (age 26)	Right-handed	—N/a	2019	₹4 crore (US$430,000)	
All-rounders
33	**Hardik Pandya**	(India)	11 October 1993 (age 33)	Right-handed	Right-arm medium-fast	2027	₹18 crore (US$1.9 million)	
17	**Marcus Stoinis**	(Australia)	16 August 1989 (age 37)	Right-handed	Right-arm medium	2025	₹11 crore (US$1.2 million)	Overseas
27	Shashank Singh	(India)	21 November 1991 (age 34)	Right-handed	Right-arm medium	2024	₹4 crore (US$430,000)	Vice Captain
9	**Azmatullah Omarzai**	(Afghanistan)	24 March 2000 (age 26)	Right-handed	Right-arm fast-medium	2025	₹2.4 crore (US$260,000)	Overseas
70	**Marco Jansen**	(South Africa)	1 May 2000 (age 26)	Right-handed	Left-arm fast	2025	₹7 crore (US$750,000)	Overseas
5	**Suryansh Shedge**	(India)	29 January 2003 (age 23)	Right-handed	Right-arm medium	2025	₹30 lakh (US$32,000)	
9	**Cooper Connolly**	(Australia)	22 August 2003 (age 23)	Left-handed	Slow left-arm orthodox	2026	₹3.0 crore (US$320,000)	Overseas
Pace bowlers
27	**Ben Dwarshuis**	(Australia)	23 June 1994 (age 32)	Left-handed	Left-arm fast-medium	2026	₹4.4 crore (US$470,000)	Overseas
31	Vijaykumar Vyshak	(India)	31 January 1997 (age 29)	Right-handed	Right-arm medium	2025	₹1.8 crore (US$190,000)	
28	**Yash Thakur**	(India)	28 December 1998 (age 27)	Right-handed	Right-arm fast-medium	2025	₹1.6 crore (US$170,000)	
15	**Xavier Bartlett**	(Australia)	17 December 1998 (age 27)	Right-handed	Right-arm fast-medium	2025	₹80 lakh (US$85,000)	Overseas
Spin bowlers
3	**Yuzvendra Chahal**	(India)	23 July 1990 (age 36)	Right-handed	Right-arm leg break	2025	₹18 crore (US$1.9 million)	
13	Harpreet Brar	(India)	16 September 1995 (age 31)	Left-handed	Left-arm orthodox	2019	₹1.5 crore (US$160,000)	
Source: PBKS Squad

== Administration and support staff ==
Position	Name
General Manager - Cricket Operations	(India) Ashish Tuli
Team Manager & Scout	(India) Vikram Hastir
Head coach	(Australia) Ricky Ponting
Batting and wicket keeping coach	(Australia) Brad Haddin
Spin bowling coach	(India) Sairaj Bahutule
Fast bowling coach	(Australia) James Hopes
Assistant Bowling Coach	(India) Trevor Gonsalves
Physiotherapist	(Australia) Andrew Leipus
Assistant Physiotherapist	(India) Abhijit Kar
Strength and conditioning coach	(India) Anand Date
Asst. Strength And Conditioning Coach	(India) Jitender Billa
Analyst	(India) Saurabh Walkar
Side Arm Thrower	(India) Prince Kumar
Side Arm Thrower	(India) Durjay Bera
Side Arm Thrower	(India) Vishwajeet Singh
Team Masseur	(India) Naresh Kumar
Assistant Masseur	(India) Arun Kumar
Sports Yoga Teacher	(India) Manoj Kumar
Source: PBKS Staff

== Statistics ==
=== Performance summary ===
As of 29 May 2025

Year	Matches	Wins	Losses	No result	% win
2008	15	10	5	0	66.67%
2009	14	7	7	0	50.00%
2010	14	4	10	0	28.57%
2011	14	7	7	0	50.00%
2012	16	8	8	0	50.00%
2013	16	8	8	0	50.00%
2014	17	12	5	0	70.59%
2015	14	3	11	0	21.43%
2016	14	4	10	0	28.57%
2017	14	7	7	0	50.00%
2018	14	6	8	0	42.86%
2019	14	6	8	0	42.86%
2020	14	6	8	0	42.86%
2021	14	6	8	0	42.86%
2022	14	7	7	0	50.00%
2023	14	6	8	0	42.86%
2024	14	5	9	0	35.71%
2025	17	10	6	1	63.64%
Total	262	122	140	1	46.30%

=== Opposition in Indian Premier League ===
As of 3 April 2026

Team	Matches	Won	Lost	Tied	No result	% win
Chennai Super Kings	33	17	16	0	0	51.51%
Delhi Capitals	33	17	17	0	0	51.51%
Kolkata Knight Riders	35	13	21	0	2	37.14%
Mumbai Indians	32	18	17	0	0	46.88%
Rajasthan Royals	29	12	17	0	0	41.38%
Royal Challengers Bengaluru	37	18	19	0	0	51.42%
Sunrisers Hyderabad	24	7	17	0	0	29.17%
Gujarat Titans	7	4	3	0	0	57.14%
Lucknow Super Giants	6	3	3	0	0	50.00%
Deccan Chargers	10	7	3	0	0	70.00%
Gujarat Lions	4	2	2	0	0	50.00%
Kochi Tuskers Kerala	1	1	0	0	0	100.00%
Pune Warriors India	6	3	3	0	0	50.00%
Rising Pune Supergiant	4	2	2	0	0	50.00%
Total	264	123	140	0	1	46.77%

Teams now defunct

- Source: ESPNcricinfo

=== Opposition in CLT20 ===
Teams	Matches	Won	Lost	Tied	No result	% win
Hobart Hurricanes	1	1	0	0	0	100.00%
Barbados Tridents	1	1	0	0	0	100.00%
Cape Cobras	1	1	0	0	0	100.00%
Northern Knights	1	1	0	0	0	100.00%
Chennai Super Kings	1	0	1	0	0	00.00%
Total	5	4	1	0	0	80.00%

== See also ==
- List of Punjab Kings cricketers
- Cricket in India
- Indian Premier League
- Saint Lucia Kings
- Caribbean Premier League
