= 2018–19 Vijay Hazare Trophy Plate Group =

Cricket tournament

- Dates: 19 September – 8 October 2018
- Administrator(s): BCCI
- Cricket format: List A cricket
- Tournament format(s): Round-robin and Playoff format
- Participants: 9

The 2018–19 Vijay Hazare Trophy was the 17th season of the Vijay Hazare Trophy, a List A cricket tournament in India. It was contested by the 37 domestic cricket teams of India, with nine teams in the Plate Group. The group stage was started on 19 September 2018, with the top team from the Plate Group progressing to the quarter-finals of the competition.

On 20 September 2018, after Pondicherry's first-round match, the Board of Control for Cricket in India (BCCI) reversed its decision of allowing extra outstation players for the team.

In the Round 8 fixture between Bihar and Sikkim, Sikkim were bowled out for 46 runs, with Bihar winning by 292 runs, the biggest margin of defeat by runs in Indian domestic cricket. In the Round 11 fixture between Uttarakhand and Sikkim, Uttarakhand's Karn Kaushal made the first double-century in the history of the Vijay Hazare Trophy, scoring 202 runs.

Bihar progressed from the Plate Group to the knock-out phase of the tournament.

== Points table ==
Pos	Team	Pld	W	L	T	NR	Pts	NRR
1	Bihar	8	7	0	0	1	30	2.724
2	Uttarakhand	8	7	1	0	0	28	1.820
3	Pondicherry	8	5	1	0	2	24	1.727
4	Nagaland	8	5	3	0	0	20	0.909
5	Meghalaya	8	4	4	0	0	16	0.791
6	Manipur	8	2	5	0	1	10	−0.197
7	Arunachal Pradesh	8	2	5	0	1	10	−1.928
8	Mizoram	8	1	6	0	1	6	−2.467
9	Sikkim	8	0	8	0	0	0	−3.182

- Top team advanced to the knockout stage and gets promoted to Elite Group C for the next season.

== Fixtures ==
=== Round 1 ===
19 September 2018
9:00
Scorecard

Mizoram; 234/8 (50 overs)	v	Arunachal Pradesh; 237/6 (47 overs)
Taruwar Kohli 127 (127); Myendung Singpho 2/34 (7 overs)		Samarth Seth 107 (126); Lalrempuia 3/43 (10 overs)

Arunachal Pradesh won by 4 wickets
GS Patel Stadium, Nadiad
Umpires: Anil Dandekar and Sudhir Asnani

- Mizoram won the toss and elected to bat.
- Myendung Singpho, Licha Tehi, Momar Ori, Sandeep Kumar Thakur, Techi Doria, Techi Neri, Samarth Seth, Utsav Pankaj Madan, Kamsha Yangfo, Akhilesh Sahani (Arunachal Pradesh), Michael Lalremkima, Lalnuntluanga, Akhil Rajput, Gaurav Singh, Sinan Khadir, Lalhruai Ralte, Saidingliana Sailo, G Lalbiakvela, K Vanlalruata and Lalrempuia (Mizoram) all made their List A debuts.

19 September 2018
9:00
Scorecard

Nagaland; 253/8 (50 overs)	v	Bihar; 254/2 (43.4 overs)
Nitesh Lohchab 79 (69); Samar Quadri 3/35 (9 overs)		Babul Kumar 121* (119); Imliwati Lemtur 1/42 (8 overs)

Bihar won by 8 wickets
Shastri Maidan, Anand
Umpires: Amiesh Saheba and Mukund Mandale

- Nagaland won the toss and elected to bat.
- Anunay Singh, Rehan Khan, Kundan Sharma, MD Rahmatullah, Rohit Raj, Vikash Ranjan, Babul Kumar (Bihar), Nitesh Lohchab, Sedezhalie Rupero, Paras Sehrawat, Hokaito Zhimomi, Imliwati Lemtur, Ravi Maurya and Tahmeed Rahman (Nagaland) all made their List A debuts.
- Babul Kumar (Bihar) scored his first century in List A cricket.

19 September 2018
9:00
Scorecard

Manipur; 120 (37.1 overs)	v	Pondicherry; 121/2 (25.3 overs)
Lakhan Rawat 29 (33); Sagar Udeshi 4/20 (7 overs)		Shashank Singh 63* (69); Bishworjit Konthoujam 2/22 (6 overs)

Pondicherry won by 8 wickets
Moti Bagh Stadium, Vadodara
Umpires: Sanjay Hazare and Pashchim Pathak

- Pondicherry won the toss and elected to field.
- Lakhan Rawat, Bonny Chingangbam, Prafullomani Singh, Hrithik Kanojia, Kangabam Singh, Akshaykumar Singh, Homendro Kabrambam, Nungleppam William Singh, Rex Rajkumar, Bishworjit Konthoujam (Manipur), Damodaren Rohit, Ashith Rajiv, Sagar Udeshi and Iqlas Naha (Pondicherry) all made their List A debuts.

=== Round 2 ===
20 September 2018
9:00
Scorecard

Mizoram; 154 (43.4 overs)	v	Meghalaya; 155/2 (27.3 overs)
Taruwar Kohli 90 (123); Raj Biswa 2/14 (4 overs)		Puneet Bisht 95* (90); Lalnuntluanga 1/21 (5 overs)

Meghalaya won by 8 wickets
GS Patel Stadium, Nadiad
Umpires: Anil Dandekar and Sudhir Asnani

- Mizoram won the toss and elected to bat.
- Chengkam Sangma, Raj Biswa, Lakhan Singh, Amiangshu Sen, Abhay Negi, Rajesh Tati (Meghalaya) and C Lalrinsanga (Mizoram) all made their List A debuts.

20 September 2018
9:00
Scorecard

Uttarakhand; 160 (43.2 overs)	v	Bihar; 163/5 (37.3 overs)
Vineet Saxena 57 (127); Anunay Singh 3/21 (6 overs)		Vikash Ranjan 79 (102); Sunny Rana 1/26 (7 overs)

Bihar won by 5 wickets
Shastri Maidan, Anand
Umpires: Amiesh Saheba and Mukund Mandale

- Bihar won the toss and elected to field.
- Ashish Sinha (Bihar), Karn Kaushal, Vaibhav Bhatt, Vaibhav Singh Panwar, Mayank Mishra, Deepak Dhapola, Dhanraj Sharma and Sunny Rana (Uttarakhand) all made their List A debuts.

20 September 2018
9:00
Scorecard

Sikkim; 84 (37.2 overs)	v	Manipur; 85/0 (19.2 overs)
Lee Yong Lepcha 29* (61); Bishworjit Konthoujam 3/9 (7 overs)		Lakhan Rawat 44* (60)

Manipur won by 10 wickets
Moti Bagh Stadium, Vadodara
Umpires: Sanjay Hazare and Pashchim Pathak

- Sikkim won the toss and elected to bat.
- Jayanta Sagatpam, Sultan Karim (Manipur), Faizan Khan, Nilesh Lamichaney, Ashish Thapa, Bikash Pradhan, Lee Yong Lepcha, Bhushan Subba, Palzor Tamang, Mandup Bhutia, Amos Rai, Som Lepcha and Padam Limboo (Sikkim) all made their List A debuts.

=== Round 3 ===
21 September 2018
9:00
Scorecard

Meghalaya; 246/6 (50 overs)	v	Nagaland; 247/3 (47.3 overs)
Raj Biswa 71 (99); Tahmeed Rahman 1/25 (6 overs)		KB Pawan 113* (131); Sylvester Mylliempdah 1/11 (2 overs)

Nagaland won by 7 wickets
GS Patel Stadium, Nadiad
Umpires: Anil Dandekar and Sudhir Asnani

- Meghalaya won the toss and elected to bat.
- Sylvester Mylliempdah, Dippu Sangma (Meghalaya) and Inakato Zhimomi (Nagaland) all made their List A debuts.

21 September 2018
9:00
Scorecard

Uttarakhand; 290/7 (50 overs)	v	Pondicherry; 226 (45.2 overs)
Karn Kaushal 100 (114); Pankaj Singh 3/68 (10 overs)		Abhishek Nayar 94 (94); Sunny Rana 4/52 (10 overs)

Uttarakhand won by 64 runs
Shastri Maidan, Anand
Umpires: Amiesh Saheba and Mukund Mandale

- Pondicherry won the toss and elected to field.
- Govindaraajan, Prabhakaran Gopalakrishnan, Saiju Titus, Vikneshwaran Marimuthu, Angadu Narayanan and Baskaran Ranjit (Pondicherry) all made their List A debuts.

21 September 2018
9:00
Scorecard

Arunachal Pradesh; 306/4 (50 overs)	v	Sikkim; 257/7 (50 overs)
Techi Doria 122 (149); Bhushan Subba 2/47 (6 overs)		Nilesh Lamichaney 123 (145); Techi Neri 2/36 (8 overs)

Arunachal Pradesh won by 49 runs
Moti Bagh Stadium, Vadodara
Umpires: Sanjay Hazare and Pashchim Pathak

- Sikkim won the toss and elected to field.
- Song Tacho (Arunachal Pradesh) and Binod Gupta (Sikkim) both made their List A debuts.

=== Round 4 ===
23 September 2018
9:00
Scorecard

Mizoram	v	Pondicherry

Match abandoned
GS Patel Stadium, Nadiad
Umpires: Anil Dandekar and Piyush Khakhar

- No toss.
- No play was possible due to rain.

23 September 2018
9:00
Scorecard

Arunachal Pradesh	v	Manipur

Match abandoned
Shastri Maidan, Anand
Umpires: Amiesh Saheba and Sanjay Hazare

- No toss.
- No play was possible due to rain.

23 September 2018
9:00
Scorecard

Sikkim; 121 (49 overs)	v	Nagaland; 122/3 (26.2 overs)
Ashish Thapa 46 (115); Imliwati Lemtur 2/20 (10 overs)		KB Pawan 83* (91); Amos Rai 1/28 (7.2 overs)

Nagaland won by 7 wickets
Moti Bagh Stadium, Vadodara
Umpires: Mukund Mandale and Pashchim Pathak

- Nagaland won the toss and elected to field.
- Mughavi Wotsa, Toni Chishi, Arun Chauhan (Nagaland), Bibek Diyali and Ajay Pradhan (Sikkim) all made their List A debuts.

=== Round 5 ===
24 September 2018
9:00
Scorecard

Bihar	v	Pondicherry

Match abandoned
GS Patel Stadium, Nadiad
Umpires: Anil Dandekar and Piyush Khakhar

- No toss.
- No play was possible due to rain.

24 September 2018
9:00
Scorecard

Meghalaya; 317/4 (43 overs)	v	Arunachal Pradesh; 61 (26 overs)
Puneet Bisht 135 (90); Techi Doria 2/49 (8 overs)		Song Tacho 16 (82); Abhay Negi 7/16 (6 overs)

Meghalaya won by 256 runs
Shastri Maidan, Anand
Umpires: Amiesh Saheba and Sanjay Hazare

- Arunachal Pradesh won the toss and elected to field.
- The match was reduced to 43 overs per side due to rain.

24 September 2018
9:00
Scorecard

Nagaland; 206/9 (50 overs)	v	Uttarakhand; 210/4 (47 overs)
Abrar Kazi 75* (96); Deepak Dhapola 4/34 (10 overs)		Vaibhav Singh Panwar 63 (85); Pawan Suyal 2/29 (7 overs)

Uttarakhand won by 6 wickets
Moti Bagh Stadium, Vadodara
Umpires: Mukund Mandale and Pashchim Pathak

- Uttarakhand won the toss and elected to field.

=== Round 6 ===
26 September 2018
9:00
Scorecard

Mizoram; 252/6 (50 overs)	v	Sikkim; 210 (47.3 overs)
Taruwar Kohli 113* (126); Palzor Tamang 3/62 (10 overs)		Palzor Tamang 47 (57); Sinan Khadir 4/35 (10 overs)

Mizoram won by 42 runs
Shastri Maidan, Anand
Umpires: Vineet Kulkarni and Rohan Pandit

- Sikkim won the toss and elected to field.
- Lalnunkima Varte (Mizoram) and Bijay Subba (Sikkim) both made their List A debuts.

26 September 2018
9:00
Scorecard

Bihar; 211/9 (50 overs)	v	Meghalaya; 103 (42.5 overs)
Anshuman Gautam 40 (51); Gurinder Singh 2/32 (10 overs)		Yogesh Nagar 22 (39); Samar Quadri 5/22 (9.5 overs)

Bihar won by 108 runs
Moti Bagh Stadium, Vadodara
Umpires: Mukund Mandale and Pashchim Pathak

- Meghalaya won the toss and elected to field.
- Anshuman Gautam (Bihar) made his List A debut.

26 September 2018
9:00
Scorecard

Manipur; 125 (37.4 overs)	v	Uttarakhand; 127/1 (26.2 overs)
Yashpal Singh 76 (120); Sunny Rana 3/27 (8.4 overs)		Vineet Saxena 52* (72)

Uttarakhand won by 9 wickets
GS Patel Stadium, Nadiad
Umpires: Anil Dandekar and Piyush Khakhar

- Uttarakhand won the toss and elected to field.
- Arya Sethi and Shubham Saudiyal (Uttarakhand) both made their List A debuts.

=== Round 7 ===
28 September 2018
9:00
Scorecard

Arunachal Pradesh; 145 (45.3 overs)	v	Bihar; 150/5 (26 overs)
Akhilesh Sahani 44 (73); Keshav Kumar 5/23 (10 overs)		Babul Kumar 57 (36); Myendung Singpho 3/50 (9 overs)

Bihar won by 5 wickets
GS Patel Stadium, Nadiad
Umpires: Anil Dandekar and Rohan Pandit

- Bihar won the toss and elected to field.
- Takar Paja and Sams Alam (Arunachal Pradesh) both made their List A debuts.

28 September 2018
9:00
Scorecard

Manipur; 279/4 (50 overs)	v	Mizoram; 69 (29.3 overs)
Yashpal Singh 102 (85); Lalnunkima Varte 2/37 (5 overs)		Sinan Khadir 17 (34); Rex Rajkumar 5/17 (9 overs)

Manipur won by 210 runs
Shastri Maidan, Anand
Umpires: Mukund Mandale and Abhijit Deshmukh

- Manipur won the toss and elected to bat.
- S Zorinliana (Mizoram) made his List A debut.

28 September 2018
9:00
Scorecard

Nagaland; 202 (45.3 overs)	v	Pondicherry; 203/8 (45.1 overs)
Rongsen Jonathan 89 (80); Abhishek Nayar 4/40 (8.3 overs)		Paras Dogra 98* (122); Abrar Kazi 2/19 (10 overs)

Pondicherry won by 2 wickets
Moti Bagh Stadium, Vadodara
Umpires: Vineet Kulkarni and Pashchim Pathak

- Pondicherry won the toss and elected to field.
- Madhavan Manohar (Pondicherry) made his List A debut.

=== Round 8 ===
30 September 2018
9:00
Scorecard

Manipur; 144 (43.3 overs)	v	Nagaland; 147/1 (34.2 overs)
Yashpal Singh 41 (56); Abrar Kazi 2/13 (9.3 overs)		Sedezhalie Rupero 52* (96); Bishworjit Konthoujam 1/40 (8.2 overs)

Nagaland won by 9 wickets
GS Patel Stadium, Nadiad
Umpires: Anil Dandekar and Rohan Pandit

- Nagaland won the toss and elected to field.
- Syed Mujibur Rahaman (Manipur) and Oren Ngullie (Nagaland) both made their List A debuts.

30 September 2018
9:00
Scorecard

Bihar; 338/6 (50 overs)	v	Sikkim; 46 (31 overs)
MD Rahmatullah 156* (103); Bhushan Subba 2/63 (10 overs)		Padam Limboo 12 (59); Keshav Kumar 3/7 (4 overs)

Bihar won by 292 runs
Shastri Maidan, Anand
Umpires: Mukund Mandale and Abhijit Deshmukh

- Sikkim won the toss and elected to field.
- Eshaan Ravi (Bihar) made his List A debut.

30 September 2018
9:00
Scorecard

Meghalaya; 141 (41.2 overs)	v	Uttarakhand; 143/2 (31 overs)
Yogesh Nagar 44 (65); Vaibhav Bhatt 3/9 (5 overs)		Vineet Saxena 66* (87); Gurinder Singh 2/34 (10 overs)

Uttarakhand won by 8 wickets
Moti Bagh Stadium, Vadodara
Umpires: Vineet Kulkarni and Pashchim Pathak

- Uttarakhand won the toss and elected to field.

=== Round 9 ===
2 October 2018
9:00
Scorecard

Sikkim; 89 (43.2 overs)	v	Pondicherry; 92/1 (15.2 overs)
Bijay Kumar Subba 17 (47); Fabid Ahmed 5/8 (9.2 overs)		Damodaren Rohit 38 (49); Binod Gupta 1/11 (3 overs)

Pondicherry won by 9 wickets
GS Patel Stadium, Nadiad
Umpires: Anil Dandekar and Abhijit Deshmukh

- Sikkim won the toss and elected to bat.
- Magendiran Chinnadurai (Pondicherry) made his List A debut.

2 October 2018
9:00
Scorecard

Arunachal Pradesh; 271/4 (50 overs)	v	Nagaland; 272/4 (44 overs)
Kshitiz Sharma 109 (129); Arun Chauhan 2/56 (10 overs)		KB Pawan 112 (103); Sandeep Kumar Thakur 3/52 (10 overs)

Nagaland won by 6 wickets
Shastri Maidan, Anand
Umpires: Amiesh Saheba and Mukund Mandale

- Nagaland won the toss and elected to field.
- Tana Davit (Arunachal Pradesh) made his List A debut.

2 October 2018
9:00
Scorecard

Uttarakhand; 321 (50 overs)	v	Mizoram; 169 (48.4 overs)
Karn Kaushal 118 (86); Taruwar Kohli 6/65 (10 overs)		Sinan Khadir 73* (84); Vaibhav Bhatt 3/38 (8 overs)

Uttarakhand won by 152 runs
Moti Bagh Stadium, Vadodara
Umpires: Sanjay Hazare and Pashchim Pathak

- Mizoram won the toss and elected to field.
- Lalhmangaiha (Mizoram) made his List A debut.

=== Round 10 ===
4 October 2018
9:00
Scorecard

Manipur; 172/8 (50 overs)	v	Bihar; 176/2 (29.1 overs)
Yashpal Singh 134* (147); Rehan Khan 3/39 (10 overs)		Babul Kumar 100* (95); Homendro Kabrambam 1/20 (6 overs)

Bihar won by 8 wickets
GS Patel Stadium, Nadiad
Umpires: Abhijit Deshmukh and Krishnamachari Srinivasan

- Manipur won the toss and elected to bat.
- Kumar Mridul (Bihar) made his List A debut.

4 October 2018
9:00
Scorecard

Meghalaya; 315/5 (50 overs)	v	Sikkim; 166/9 (50 overs)
Puneet Bisht 149 (106); Palzor Tamang 1/40 (10 overs)		Lee Yong Lepcha 36 (54); Gurinder Singh 4/20 (10 overs)

Meghalaya won by 149 runs
Shastri Maidan, Anand
Umpires: Ulhas Gandhe and Amiesh Saheba

- Meghalaya won the toss and elected to bat.
- Babloo Passah and Wanlambok Nongkhlaw (Meghalaya) both made their List A debuts.

4 October 2018
9:00
Scorecard

Arunachal Pradesh; 95 (34.1 overs)	v	Pondicherry; 100/3 (18.2 overs)
Samarth Seth 32 (47); Akshay Jain 5/13 (10 overs)		Abhishek Nayar 65* (54); Techi Neri 2/6 (4 overs)

Pondicherry won by 7 wickets
Moti Bagh Stadium, Vadodara
Umpires: Nitin Pandit and Sanjay Hazare

- Arunachal Pradesh won the toss and elected to bat.
- Sai Karthik and Akshay Jain (Pondicherry) both made their List A debuts.

=== Round 11 ===
6 October 2018
9:00
Scorecard

Uttarakhand; 366/2 (50 overs)	v	Sikkim; 167/6 (50 overs)
Karn Kaushal 202 (135); Mandup Bhutia 2/82 (10 overs)		Lee Yong Lepcha 65 (104); Deepak Dhapola 3/19 (5 overs)

Uttarakhand won by 199 runs
GS Patel Stadium, Nadiad
Umpires: Abhijit Deshmukh and Sudhir Asnani

- Sikkim won the toss and elected to field.
- Saurabh Chauhan, Vijay Jethi and Kartik Joshi (Uttarakhand) all made their List A debuts.

6 October 2018
9:00
Scorecard

Mizoram; 100 (42.2 overs)	v	Nagaland; 102/2 (12.5 overs)
Taruwar Kohli 33 (70); Inakato Zhimomi 3/8 (6 overs)		Nitesh Lohchab 49* (35); S Zorinliana 2/21 (3 overs)

Nagaland won by 8 wickets
Shastri Maidan, Anand
Umpires: Ulhas Gandhe and Amiesh Saheba

- Mizoram won the toss and elected to bat.

6 October 2018
9:00
Scorecard

Meghalaya; 238/5 (50 overs)	v	Manipur; 170 (45.4 overs)
Yogesh Nagar 67* (79); Jitender 3/29 (10 overs)		Yashpal Singh 106* (108); Lakhan Singh 3/24 (7.4 overs)

Meghalaya won by 68 runs
Moti Bagh Stadium, Vadodara
Umpires: Nitin Pandit and Sanjay Hazare

- Manipur won the toss and elected to field.
- Jitender, Somorjit Salam and Shelley Shaurya (Manipur) all made their List A debuts.

=== Round 12 ===
8 October 2018
9:00
Scorecard

Pondicherry; 324/5 (50 overs)	v	Meghalaya; 250/5 (50 overs)
Paras Dogra 136* (97); Mark Ingty 2/75 (10 overs)		Yogesh Nagar 109* (113); Prabhakaran Gopalakrishnan 1/40 (8 overs)

Pondicherry won by 74 runs
Shastri Maidan, Anand
Umpires: Ulhas Gandhe and Amiesh Saheba

- Pondicherry won the toss and elected to bat.

8 October 2018
9:00
Scorecard

Mizoram; 83 (27.2 overs)	v	Bihar; 87/1 (15.4 overs)
Akhil Rajput 43 (65); Keshav Kumar 4/21 (7.2 overs)		Vikash Ranjan 59* (50); Lalrempuia 1/26 (6 overs)

Bihar won by 9 wickets
Moti Bagh Stadium, Vadodara
Umpires: Nitin Pandit and Sanjay Hazare

- Mizoram won the toss and elected to bat.
- Manish Rai (Bihar) made his List A debut.

8 October 2018
9:00
Scorecard

Uttarakhand; 264 (49.4 overs)	v	Arunachal Pradesh; 156/9 (50 overs)
Saurabh Rawat 67 (64); Sams Alam 2/39 (10 overs)		Akhilesh Sahani 41 (57); Rajat Bhatia 3/17 (10 overs)

Uttarakhand won by 108 runs
GS Patel Stadium, Nadiad
Umpires: Abhijit Deshmukh and Krishnamachari Srinivasan

- Uttarakhand won the toss and elected to bat.
