= 2018–19 Syed Mushtaq Ali Trophy Group A =

Cricket tournament

- Dates: 21 February – 2 March 2019
- Administrator: BCCI
- Cricket format: Twenty20 cricket
- Tournament format(s): Round-robin and Playoff format
- Participants: 8

The 2018–19 Syed Mushtaq Ali Trophy was the tenth season of the Syed Mushtaq Ali Trophy, a Twenty20 cricket tournament in India. It was contested by the 37 domestic cricket teams of India, with eight teams in Group A. The group stage started on 21 February 2019, with the top two teams progressing to the Super League section of the competition.

Jharkhand won the group, with Delhi finishing second to progress to the Super League stage of the tournament.

== Points table ==
Team	Pld	W	L	T	NR	Pts	NRR
Jharkhand	6	5	1	0	0	20	+1.838
Delhi	6	5	1	0	0	20	+1.604
Kerala	6	4	2	0	0	16	+1.920
Andhra (H)	6	3	3	0	0	12	+1.832
Jammu & Kashmir	6	3	3	0	0	12	-0.410
Manipur	6	1	5	0	0	4	–3.244
Nagaland	6	0	6	0	0	0	–3.876

- Top two teams advanced to the Super League.

(H)- Host

== Fixtures ==
=== Round 1 ===
21 February 2019
Scorecard

Jharkhand; 158/4 (20 overs)	v	Delhi; 155/5 (20 overs)
Virat Singh 70* (49); Suboth Bhati 2/33 (4 overs)		Dhruv Shorey 70 (55); Shahbaz Nadeem 2/26 (4 overs)

Jharkhand won by 3 runs
Devineni Venkata Ramana Praneetha Ground, Mulapadu
Umpires: Mukund Mandale and Vineet Kulkarni

- Delhi won the toss and elected to field.
- Hiten Dalal, Anuj Rawat (Delhi) and Anukul Roy (Jharkhand) all made their T20 debuts.

21 February 2019
Scorecard

Kerala; 186/5 (20 overs)	v	Manipur; 103/7 (20 overs)
Sachin Baby 75* (46); Homendro Kabrambam 2/25 (3 overs)		Yashpal Singh 40* (28); Rohan Prem 1/7 (3 overs)

Kerala won by 83 runs
Devineni Venkata Ramana Praneetha Ground, Mulapadu
Umpires: Ulhas Gandhe and Mukund Mandale

- Kerala won the toss and elected to bat.
- MD Nidheesh (Kerala), Mayank Raghav, Hrithik Kanojia, Ahmed Shah, Kishan Thokchom, Narisingh Yadav, Prafullomani Singh, Ajay Lamabam, Homendro Kabrambam, Kangabam Singh and Bishworjit Konthoujam (Manipur) all made their T20 debuts.

21 February 2019
Scorecard

Nagaland; 136/6 (20 overs)	v	Jammu & Kashmir; 142/1 (15.5 overs)
KB Pawan 53* (37); Parvez Rasool 2/26 (4 overs)		Abdul Samad 76* (51); Tahmeed Rahman 1/27 (3 overs)

Jammu & Kashmir won by 9 wickets
Chukkapalli Pitchaiah Cricket Ground, Mulapadu
Umpires: Yeshwant Barde and Sadashiv Iyer

- Jammu & Kashmir won the toss and elected to field.
- Abdul Samad, Suryansh Raina, Mujtaba Yousuf (Jammu & Kashmir), Rohit Jhanjhariya, Sedezhalie Rupero, Nitesh Lohchab, Imliwati Lemtur, Tahmeed Rahman, Rahul Sharma and Mughavi Wotsa (Nagaland) all made their T20 debuts.

=== Round 2 ===
22 February 2019
Scorecard

Manipur; 113/6 (20 overs)	v	Delhi; 119/0 (11.4 overs)
Yashpal Singh 50 (44); Suboth Bhati 3/15 (4 overs)		Hiten Dalal 56* (38)

Delhi won by 10 wickets
Devineni Venkata Ramana Praneetha Ground, Mulapadu
Umpires: Mukund Mandale and Vineet Kulkarni

- Delhi won the toss and elected to field.

22 February 2019
Scorecard

Jammu & Kashmir; 168/9 (20 overs)	v	Jharkhand; 170/1 (16.4 overs)
Jatin Wadhwan 47 (37); Rahul Shukla 5/36 (4 overs)		Ishan Kishan 100* (55); Umar Nazir 1/34 (3 overs)

Jharkhand won by 9 wickets
Chukkapalli Pitchaiah Cricket Ground, Mulapadu
Umpires: Ulhas Gandhe and Yeshwant Barde

- Jharkhand won the toss and elected to field.
- Rasikh Salam (Jammu & Kashmir) made his T20 debut.
- Rahul Shukla (Jharkhand) took his first five-wicket haul in a T20 match.

22 February 2019
Scorecard

Andhra; 244/4 (20 overs)	v	Nagaland; 65 (13.1 overs)
Ricky Bhui 108* (42); Rachit Bhatia 2/44 (4 overs)		Rongsen Jonathan 30 (25); KV Sasikanth 3/8 (2 overs)

Andhra won by 179 runs
Devineni Venkata Ramana Praneetha Ground, Mulapadu
Umpires: Mukund Mandale and Vineet Kulkarni

- Andhra won the toss and elected to bat.
- Paras Sehrawat, Rachit Bhatia, Inakato Zhimomi (Nagaland) and Shaik Ismail (Andhra) all made their T20 debuts.
- This was the largest winning margin, by runs, in a Twenty20 cricket match.

=== Round 3 ===
24 February 2019
Scorecard

Jammu & Kashmir; 189/7 (20 overs)	v	Delhi; 191/6 (19.5 overs)
Shubham Pundir 57 (33); Suboth Bhati 3/26 (4 overs)		Lalit Yadav 47* (28); Mujtaba Yousuf 1/33 (4 overs)

Delhi won by 4 wickets
Chukkapalli Pitchaiah Cricket Ground, Mulapadu
Umpires: Ulhas Gandhe and Sadashiv Iyer

- Delhi won the toss and elected to field.

24 February 2019
Scorecard

Jharkhand; 219/1 (20 overs)	v	Manipur; 98/9 (20 overs)
Ishan Kishan 113* (62); Kangabam Singh 1/38 (4 overs)		Yashpal Singh 40 (31); Utkarsh Singh 3/7 (3 overs)

Jharkhand won by 121 runs
Devineni Venkata Ramana Praneetha Ground, Mulapadu
Umpires: Mukund Mandale and Vineet Kulkarni

- Manipur won the toss and elected to field.
- Utkarsh Singh (Jharkhand), Rajesh Singh and Sultan Karim (Manipur) all made their T20 debuts.
- Ishan Kishan (Jharkhand) became the second Indian batsman to make back-to-back centuries in T20 cricket.

24 February 2019
Scorecard

Kerala; 160/6 (20 overs)	v	Andhra; 152 (19.4 overs)
Vishnu Vinod 70 (61); Girinath Reddy 2/18 (3 overs)		Prasanth Kumar 57 (36); Sandeep Warrier 3/27 (3.4 overs)

Kerala won by 8 runs
Devineni Venkata Ramana Praneetha Ground, Mulapadu
Umpires: Mukund Mandale and Vineet Kulkarni

- Kerala won the toss and elected to bat.
- Sandeep Warrier (Kerala) took a hat-trick.

=== Round 4 ===
25 February 2019
Scorecard

Kerala; 139/7 (20 overs)	v	Delhi; 140/3 (18.3 overs)
Vinoop Manoharan 38 (31); Navdeep Saini 1/17 (4 overs)		Nitish Rana 52* (36); Sandeep Warrier 1/19 (4 overs)

Delhi won by 7 wickets
Devineni Venkata Ramana Praneetha Ground, Mulapadu
Umpires: Mukund Mandale and Yeshwant Barde

- Kerala won the toss and elected to bat.

25 February 2019
Scorecard

Nagaland; 132/7 (20 overs)	v	Manipur; 134/0 (16.3 overs)
Abrar Kazi 36 (22); Kangabam Singh 3/23 (4 overs)		Mayank Raghav 80* (45)

Manipur won by 10 wickets
Chukkapalli Pitchaiah Cricket Ground, Mulapadu
Umpires: Vineet Kulkarni and Sadashiv Iyer

- Nagaland won the toss and elected to bat.
- Bonny Chingangbam (Manipur), Abhishek Kaushik, Manjinder Singh, Kiran Reddy and Toni Chishi (Nagaland) all made their T20 debuts.

25 February 2019
Scorecard

Andhra; 146/7 (20 overs)	v	Jammu & Kashmir; 148/5 (18.3 overs)
Srikar Bharat 41 (38); Ram Dayal 2/23 (4 overs)		Shubham Pundir 51 (36); Bandaru Ayyappa 2/23 (4 overs)

Jammu & Kashmir won by 5 wickets
Devineni Venkata Ramana Praneetha Ground, Mulapadu
Umpires: Mukund Mandale and Yeshwant Barde

- Jammu & Kashmir won the toss and elected to field.

=== Round 5 ===
27 February 2019
Scorecard

Kerala; 159/7 (20 overs)	v	Jammu & Kashmir; 65 (14.2 overs)
Vinoop Manoharan 52 (42); Irfan Pathan 2/32 (4 overs)		Jatin Wadhwan 24 (28); Sudhesan Midhun 3/9 (3.2 overs)

Kerala won by 94 runs
Devineni Venkata Ramana Praneetha Ground, Mulapadu
Umpires: Mukund Mandale and Yeshwant Barde

- Jammu & Kashmir won the toss and elected to field.

27 February 2019
Scorecard

Jharkhand; 197/3 (20 overs)	v	Nagaland; 143/3 (20 overs)
Kumar Deobrat 69* (32); Imliwati Lemtur 1/29 (2 overs)		Rongsen Jonathan 47 (33); Utkarsh Singh 1/5 (1 over)

Jharkhand won by 54 runs
Chukkapalli Pitchaiah Cricket Ground, Mulapadu
Umpires: Ulhas Gandhe and Nand Kishore

- Jharkhand won the toss and elected to bat.
- Aditya Gupta, Bhavik Patel and Dhavanath Nagender (Nagaland) all made their T20 debuts.

27 February 2019
Scorecard

Delhi; 175/8 (20 overs)	v	Andhra; 143 (19.3 overs)
Unmukt Chand 70 (35); Bandaru Ayyappa 2/36 (4 overs)		Ashwin Hebbar 38 (29); Suboth Bhati 4/27 (3.3 overs)

Delhi won by 32 runs
Devineni Venkata Ramana Praneetha Ground, Mulapadu
Umpires: Mukund Mandale and Vineet Kulkarni

- Delhi won the toss and elected to bat.

=== Round 6 ===
28 February 2019
Scorecard

Nagaland; 103/8 (20 overs)	v	Kerala; 105/0 (12.2 overs)
Rohit Jhanjhariya 49* (53); MD Nidheesh 3/17 (4 overs)		Vishnu Vinod 53* (38)

Kerala won by 10 wickets
Devineni Venkata Ramana Praneetha Ground, Mulapadu
Umpires: Ulhas Gandhe and Mukund Mandale

- Kerala won the toss and elected to field.
- Rohan Kunnummal (Kerala) made his T20 debut.

28 February 2019
Scorecard

Manipur; 182/6 (20 overs)	v	Jammu & Kashmir; 184/2 (17.1 overs)
Mayank Raghav 103 (66); Rasikh Salam 3/38 (4 overs)		Bandeep Singh 59* (26); Yashpal Singh 1/19 (3 overs)

Jammu & Kashmir won by 8 wickets
Chukkapalli Pitchaiah Cricket Ground, Mulapadu
Umpires: Vineet Kulkarni and Yeshwant Barde

- Jammu & Kashmir won the toss and elected to field.
- Sharukh Dar, Nawazul Munier (Jammu & Kashmir) and Akoijam Tenyson Singh (Manipur) all made their T20 debuts.

28 February 2019
Scorecard

Andhra; 179 (20 overs)	v	Jharkhand; 176 (19.5 overs)
Manyala Pranith 43 (17); Shahbaz Nadeem 3/26 (4 overs)		Saurabh Tiwary 54 (32); Prithvi Raj 3/28 (3.5 overs)

Andhra won by 3 runs
Devineni Venkata Ramana Praneetha Ground, Mulapadu
Umpires: Ulhas Gandhe and Mukund Mandale

- Andhra won the toss and elected to bat.
- Manyala Pranith and Prithvi Raj (Andhra) both made their T20 debuts.

=== Round 7 ===
2 March 2019
Scorecard

Nagaland; 118 (19.4 overs)	v	Delhi; 119/3 (12.3 overs)
Aditya 64 (46); Suboth Bhati 4/14 (3.4 overs)		Hiten Dalal 81 (40); Pawan Suyal 1/11 (4 overs)

Delhi won by 7 wickets
Chukkapalli Pitchaiah Cricket Ground, Mulapadu
Umpires: Ulhas Gandhe and Vineet Kulkarni

- Nagaland won the toss and elected to bat.
- Gaurav Kumar (Delhi) and Gaurav Vishwakarma (Nagaland) both made their T20 debuts.

2 March 2019
Scorecard

Kerala; 176/6 (20 overs)	v	Jharkhand; 180/5 (19.1 overs)
Sachin Baby 36 (23); Vikash Singh 2/34 (4 overs)		Anand Singh 72 (47); Sandeep Warrier 2/21 (3.1 overs)

Jharkhand won by 5 wickets
Chukkapalli Devineni Venkata Ramana Praneetha Ground, Mulapadu
Umpires: Mukund Mandale and Yeshwant Barde

- Kerala won the toss and elected to bat.

2 March 2019
Scorecard

Andhra; 252/4 (20 overs)	v	Manipur; 161/5 (20 overs)
Ashwin Hebbar 71 (37); Yashpal Singh 3/40 (3 overs)		Mayank Raghav 65 (42); Dasari Swaroop Kumar 3/26 (4 overs)

Andhra won by 91 runs
Chukkapalli Devineni Venkata Ramana Praneetha Ground, Mulapadu
Umpires: Mukund Mandale and Nand Kishore

- Andhra won the toss and elected to bat.
