= List of 2023 Indian Premier League personnel changes =

2023 Indian Premier League Auction

General information
- Sport: Cricket
- Date: 23 December 2022
- Time: 2:30 PM
- Location: Kochi
- Networks: Star Sports (TV); JioCinema (Internet)
- Sponsored by: Tata

Overview
- League: Indian Premier League
- Teams: 10

This is a list of all personnel changes for 2023 Indian Premier League (IPL).

== Retirement ==
Date	Name	2022 Team	Age	Ref.
14 September 2022	Robin Uthappa	Chennai Super Kings	36	
15 November 2022	Kieron Pollard	Mumbai Indians	35	
2 December 2022	Dwayne Bravo	Chennai Super Kings	39	

== Pre-auction ==
The Board of Control for Cricket in India set the deadline of 15 November 2022 5 pm IST for the list of retained and released players of IPL franchise teams before the mini auction.

=== Transfers ===
Player	Nationality	Salary	From	To	Date	Ref
Jason Behrendorff	Australia	₹75 lakh (US$78,000)	Royal Challengers Bangalore	Mumbai Indians	12 November 2022	
Lockie Ferguson	New Zealand	₹10 crore (US$1.0 million)	Gujarat Titans	Kolkata Knight Riders	13 November 2022	
Rahmanullah Gurbaz	Afghanistan	₹50 lakh (US$52,000)	Gujarat Titans	Kolkata Knight Riders	13 November 2022	
Shardul Thakur	India	₹10.75 crore (US$1.1 million)	Delhi Capitals	Kolkata Knight Riders	14 November 2022	
Aman Khan	India	₹20 lakh (US$21,000)	Kolkata Knight Riders	Delhi Capitals	14 November 2022	

=== Released players ===
Player	Nationality	Salary
Chennai Super Kings
Dwayne Bravo (Note: Player retired after the 2022 IPL)	West Indies	₹4.40 crore
Chris Jordan	England	₹3.60 crore
Robin Uthappa	India	₹2 crore
Adam Milne	New Zealand	₹1.90 crore
Bhagath Varma	India	₹20 lakh
Chezhian Harinishanth	India	₹20 lakh
KM Asif	India	₹20 lakh
Narayan Jagadeesan	India	₹20 lakh
Delhi Capitals
K. S. Bharat	India	₹2 crore
Mandeep Singh	India	₹1.10 crore
Tim Seifert	New Zealand	₹50 lakh
Ashwin Hebbar	India	₹20 lakh
Gujarat Titans
Jason Roy	England	₹2 crore
Dominic Drakes	West Indies	₹1.10 crore
Gurkeerat Singh	India	₹50 lakh
Varun Aaron	India	₹50 lakh
Kolkata Knight Riders
Pat Cummins	Australia	₹7.25 crore
Shivam Mavi	India	₹7.25 crore
Sam Billings	England	₹2 crore
Aaron Finch (REP)	Australia	₹1.50 crore
Alex Hales (*)	England	₹1.50 crore
Ajinkya Rahane	India	₹1 crore
Mohammad Nabi	Afghanistan	₹1 crore
Sheldon Jackson	India	₹60 lakh
Ashok Sharma	India	₹55 lakh
Chamika Karunaratne	Sri Lanka	₹50 lakh
Abhijeet Tomar	India	₹40 lakh
Baba Indrajith	India	₹20 lakh
Pratham Singh	India	₹20 lakh
Ramesh Kumar	India	₹20 lakh
Rasikh Salam Dar	India	₹20 lakh
Lucknow Super Giants
Jason Holder	West Indies	₹8.75 crore
Manish Pandey	India	₹4.60 crore
Dushmanta Chameera	Sri Lanka	₹2 crore
Evin Lewis	West Indies	₹2 crore
Andrew Tye (REP)	Australia	₹1.50 crore
Ankit Singh Rajpoot	India	₹50 lakh
Shahbaz Nadeem	India	₹50 lakh
Mumbai Indians
Kieron Pollard	West Indies	₹6 crore
Daniel Sams	Australia	₹2.60 crore
Murugan Ashwin	India	₹1.60 crore
Tymal Mills	England	₹1.50 crore
Jaydev Unadkat	India	₹1.30 crore
Riley Meredith	Australia	₹1 crore
Fabian Allen	West Indies	₹75 lakh
Mayank Markande	India	₹65 lakh
Sanjay Yadav	India	₹50 lakh
Basil Thampi	India	₹30 lakh
Anmolpreet Singh	India	₹20 lakh
Aryan Juyal	India	₹20 lakh
Rahul Buddhi	India	₹20 lakh
Punjab Kings
Mayank Agarwal	India	₹14 crore
Odean Smith	West Indies	₹6 crore
Vaibhav Arora	India	₹2 crore
Sandeep Sharma	India	₹50 lakh
Benny Howell	England	₹40 lakh
Ishan Porel	India	₹25 lakh
Ansh Patel	India	₹20 lakh
Prerak Mankad	India	₹20 lakh
Writtick Chatterjee	India	₹20 lakh
Rajasthan Royals
Nathan Coulter-Nile	Australia	₹2 crore
James Neesham	New Zealand	₹1.50 crore
Rassie van der Dussen	South Africa	₹1 crore
Daryl Mitchell	New Zealand	₹75 lakh
Karun Nair	India	₹50 lakh
Anunay Singh	India	₹20 lakh
Corbin Bosch (REP)	South Africa	₹20 lakh
Shubham Garhwal	India	₹20 lakh
Tejas Baroka	India	₹20 lakh
Royal Challengers Bangalore
Aneeshwar Gautam	India	₹1 crore
Sherfane Rutherford	West Indies	₹1 crore
Chama Milind	India	₹25 lakh
Luvnith Sisodia	India	₹20 lakh
Sunrisers Hyderabad
Kane Williamson	New Zealand	₹14 crore
Nicholas Pooran	West Indies	₹10.75 crore
Romario Shepherd	West Indies	₹7.75 crore
Sean Abbott	Australia	₹2.40 crore
Shreyas Gopal	India	₹75 lakh
Vishnu Vinod	India	₹50 lakh
Jagadeesha Suchith	India	₹20 lakh
Priyam Garg	India	₹20 lakh
Ravikumar Samarth	India	₹20 lakh
Saurabh Dubey (*)	India	₹20 lakh
Shashank Singh	India	₹20 lakh
Sushant Mishra (REP)	India	₹20 lakh

^{REP} REP: Players who were unsold originally in the 2022 auction but were later signed up as a replacement player.

=== Retained players ===
The team retentions were announced on 15 November 2022.

Player	Nationality	Salary
Chennai Super Kings
Ravindra Jadeja	India	₹16 crore
Deepak Chahar	India	₹14 crore
MS Dhoni	India	₹12 crore
Moeen Ali	England	₹8 crore
Ambati Rayudu	India	₹6.75 crore
Ruturaj Gaikwad	India	₹6 crore
Shivam Dube	India	₹4 crore
Mitchell Santner	New Zealand	₹1.9 crore
Rajvardhan Hangargekar	India	₹1.5 crore
Prashant Solanki	India	₹1.2 crore
Devon Conway	New Zealand	₹1 crore
Maheesh Theekshana	Sri Lanka	₹70 lakh
Dwaine Pretorius	South Africa	₹50 lakh
Matheesha Pathirana (REP)	Sri Lanka	₹20 lakh
Mukesh Choudhary	India	₹20 lakh
Simarjeet Singh	India	₹20 lakh
Subhranshu Senapati	India	₹20 lakh
Tushar Deshpande	India	₹20 lakh
Delhi Capitals
Rishabh Pant	India	₹16 crore
Axar Patel	India	₹9 crore
Prithvi Shaw	India	₹7.5 crore
Anrich Nortje	South Africa	₹6.5 crore
Mitchell Marsh	Australia	₹6.5 crore
David Warner	Australia	₹6.25 crore
Khaleel Ahmed	India	₹5.25 crore
Chetan Sakariya	India	₹4.2 crore
Rovman Powell	West Indies	₹2.8 crore
Kuldeep Yadav	India	₹2 crore
Mustafizur Rahman	Bangladesh	₹2 crore
Kamlesh Nagarkoti	India	₹1.1 crore
Lalit Yadav	India	₹65 lakh
Lungi Ngidi	South Africa	₹50 lakh
Praveen Dubey	India	₹50 lakh
Yash Dhull	India	₹50 lakh
Aman Hakim Khan (T)	India	₹20 lakh
Ripal Patel	India	₹20 lakh
Sarfaraz Khan	India	₹20 lakh
Vicky Ostwal	India	₹20 lakh
Gujarat Titans
Hardik Pandya	India	₹15 crore
Rashid Khan	Afghanistan	₹15 crore
Rahul Tewatia	India	₹9 crore
Shubman Gill	India	₹8 crore
Mohammed Shami	India	₹6.25 crore
Yash Dayal	India	₹3.2 crore
David Miller	South Africa	₹3 crore
Ravisrinivasan Sai Kishore	India	₹3 crore
Abhinav Manohar	India	₹2.6 crore
Alzarri Joseph	West Indies	₹2.4 crore
Matthew Wade	Australia	₹2.4 crore
Wriddhiman Saha	India	₹1.9 crore
Jayant Yadav	India	₹1.7 crore
Vijay Shankar	India	₹1.4 crore
Noor Ahmad	Afghanistan	₹30 lakh
Darshan Nalkande	India	₹20 lakh
Pradeep Sangwan	India	₹20 lakh
Sai Sudharshan	India	₹20 lakh
Kolkata Knight Riders
Andre Russell	West Indies	₹12 crore
Shreyas Iyer	India	₹12.25 crore
Varun Chakravarthy	India	₹8 crore
Shardul Thakur (T)	India	₹10.75 crore
Lockie Ferguson (T)	New Zealand	₹10 crore
Nitish Rana	India	₹8 crore
Venkatesh Iyer	India	₹8 crore
Sunil Narine	West Indies	₹6 crore
Umesh Yadav	India	₹2 crore
Tim Southee	New Zealand	₹1.5 crore
Rinku Singh	India	₹55 lakh
Rahmanullah Gurbaz (T)	Afghanistan	₹50 lakh
Anukul Roy	India	₹20 lakh
Harshit Rana (REP)	India	₹20 lakh
Lucknow Super Giants
KL Rahul	India	₹17 crore
Avesh Khan	India	₹10 crore
Marcus Stoinis	Australia	₹9.2 crore
Krunal Pandya	India	₹8.25 crore
Mark Wood	England	₹7.5 crore
Quinton de Kock	South Africa	₹6.75 crore
Deepak Hooda	India	₹5.75 crore
Ravi Bishnoi	India	₹4 crore
Krishnappa Gowtham	India	₹90 lakh
Kyle Mayers	West Indies	₹50 lakh
Ayush Badoni	India	₹20 lakh
Karan Sharma	India	₹20 lakh
Manan Vohra	India	₹20 lakh
Mayank Yadav	India	₹20 lakh
Mohsin Khan	India	₹20 lakh
Mumbai Indians
Rohit Sharma	India	₹16 crore
Ishan Kishan	India	₹15.25 crore
Jasprit Bumrah	India	₹12 crore
Tim David	Australia	₹8.25 crore
Jofra Archer	England	₹8 crore
Suryakumar Yadav	India	₹8 crore
Dewald Brevis	South Africa	₹3 crore
Tilak Varma	India	₹1.7 crore
Jason Behrendorff (T)	Australia	₹75 lakh
Arjun Tendulkar	India	₹30 lakh
Akash Madhwal (REP)	India	₹20 lakh
Hrithik Shokeen	India	₹20 lakh
Kumar Kartikeya Singh (REP)	India	₹20 lakh
Mohd Arshad Khan	India	₹20 lakh
Ramandeep Singh	India	₹20 lakh
Tristan Stubbs (REP)	South Africa	₹20 lakh
Punjab Kings
Liam Livingstone	England	₹11.5 crore
Kagiso Rabada	South Africa	₹9.25 crore
Shahrukh Khan	India	₹9 crore
Shikhar Dhawan	India	₹8.25 crore
Jonny Bairstow	England	₹6.75 crore
Rahul Chahar	India	₹5.25 crore
Arshdeep Singh	India	₹4 crore
Harpreet Brar	India	₹3.8 crore
Raj Bawa	India	₹2 crore
Nathan Ellis	Australia	₹75 lakh
Prabhsimran Singh	India	₹60 lakh
Rishi Dhawan	India	₹55 lakh
Bhanuka Rajapaksa	Sri Lanka	₹50 lakh
Atharva Taide	India	₹20 lakh
Baltej Dhanda	India	₹20 lakh
Jitesh Sharma	India	₹20 lakh
Rajasthan Royals
Sanju Samson	India	₹14 crore
Jos Buttler	England	₹10 crore
Prasidh Krishna	India	₹10 crore
Shimron Hetmyer	West Indies	₹8.5 crore
Trent Boult	New Zealand	₹8 crore
Devdutt Padikkal	India	₹7.75 crore
Yuzvendra Chahal	India	₹6.5 crore
Ravichandran Ashwin	India	₹5 crore
Yashasvi Jaiswal	India	₹4 crore
Riyan Parag	India	₹3.8 crore
Navdeep Saini	India	₹2.6 crore
Obed McCoy	West Indies	₹75 lakh
K.C.Cariappa	India	₹30 lakh
Dhruv Jurel	India	₹20 lakh
Kuldeep Sen	India	₹20 lakh
Kuldip Yadav	India	₹20 lakh
Royal Challengers Bangalore
Virat Kohli	India	₹15 crore
Glenn Maxwell	Australia	₹11 crore
Harshal Patel	India	₹10.75 crore
Wanindu Hasaranga	Sri Lanka	₹10.75 crore
Josh Hazlewood	Australia	₹7.75 crore
Faf du Plessis	South Africa	₹7 crore
Mohammed Siraj	India	₹7 crore
Dinesh Karthik	India	₹5.5 crore
Anuj Rawat	India	₹3.4 crore
Shahbaz Ahmed	India	₹2.4 crore
David Willey	England	₹2 crore
Mahipal Lomror	India	₹95 lakh
Finn Allen	New Zealand	₹80 lakh
Siddarth Kaul	India	₹75 lakh
Karn Sharma	India	₹50 lakh
Suyash Prabhudessai	India	₹30 lakh
Akash Deep	India	₹20 lakh
Rajat Patidar (REP)	India	₹20 lakh
Sunrisers Hyderabad
Washington Sundar	India	₹8.75 crore
Rahul Tripathi	India	₹8.5 crore
Abhishek Sharma	India	₹6.5 crore
Bhuvneshwar Kumar	India	₹4.2 crore
Marco Jansen	South Africa	₹4.2 crore
Abdul Samad	India	₹4 crore
Kartik Tyagi	India	₹4 crore
T. Natarajan	India	₹4 crore
Umran Malik	India	₹4 crore
Aiden Markram	South Africa	₹2.6 crore
Glenn Phillips	New Zealand	₹1.5 crore
Fazalhaq Farooqi	Afghanistan	₹50 lakh

== Auction ==
The IPL 2023 auction was conducted on 23 December 2022 in Kochi. A total of 405 players were available for auction including 273 Indian and 132 foreign players. 87 places were available to be filled across the ten teams. The first three Indian players in the lists released on 13 December were Mayank Agarwal, Ajinkya Rahane and Ishant Sharma. The first three foreign players were Harry Brook, Joe Root and Rilee Rossouw. It was, however, expected that Ben Stokes would be the main attraction. In the event, the top bid was made for Sam Curran, bought by Punjab Kings for 1,850 lakh, who surpassed Rajasthan Royals's 1,625 lakh bid for Chris Morris in the 2021 auction, effectively making Curran the most expensive player in the history of the IPL.

=== Sold players ===
S.No.	Set No.	Set	Name	Country	Playing Role	IPL Matches	Capped / Uncapped / Associate	Base Price (in ₹ Lacs)	IPL 2023 Team	Auctioned Price (in ₹ Lacs)	IPL 2022 Team	Previous IPL Team(s)
6	1	BA1	Kane Williamson	New Zealand	Batsman	76	Capped	200	Gujarat Titans	200	Sunrisers Hyderabad	
2	1	BA1	Harry Brook	England	Batsman	0	Capped	150	Sunrisers Hyderabad	1,325		
1	1	BA1	Mayank Agarwal	India	Batsman	113	Capped	100	Sunrisers Hyderabad	825	Punjab Kings	Rising Pune Supergiant; Delhi Daredevils; Royal Challengers Bangalore
3	1	BA1	Ajinkya Rahane	India	Batsman	158	Capped	50	Chennai Super Kings	50	Kolkata Knight Riders	Delhi Capitals; Rajasthan Royals; Rising Pune Supergiant; Mumbai Indians
7	2	AL1	Sam Curran	England	All-rounder	32	Capped	200	Punjab Kings	1,850		Chennai Super Kings; Kings XI Punjab
12	2	AL1	Odean Smith	West Indies	All-rounder	6	Capped	50	Gujarat Titans	50	Punjab Kings	
11	2	AL1	Sikandar Raza	Zimbabwe	All-rounder	0	Capped	50	Punjab Kings	50		
10	2	AL1	Jason Holder	West Indies	All-rounder	38	Capped	200	Rajasthan Royals	575	Lucknow Super Giants	Chennai Super Kings; Kolkata Knight Riders; Sunrisers Hyderabad
8	2	AL1	Cameron Green	Australia	All-rounder	0	Capped	200	Mumbai Indians	1,750		
13	2	AL1	Ben Stokes	England	All-rounder	43	Capped	200	Chennai Super Kings	1,625		Rajasthan Royals; Rising Pune Supergiant
18	3	WK1	Nicholas Pooran	West Indies	Wicket-keeper	47	Capped	200	Lucknow Super Giants	1,600	Sunrisers Hyderabad	Mumbai Indians; Punjab Kings
16	3	WK1	Heinrich Klaasen	South Africa	Wicket-keeper	7	Capped	100	Sunrisers Hyderabad	525		Rajasthan Royals; Royal Challengers Bangalore
19	3	WK1	Phil Salt	England	Wicket-keeper	0	Capped	200	Delhi Capitals	200		
24	4	FA1	Reece Topley	England	Bowler	0	Capped	75	Royal Challengers Bangalore	190		
25	4	FA1	Jaydev Unadkat	India	Bowler	91	Capped	50	Lucknow Super Giants	50	Mumbai Indians	Rising Pune Supergiants; Kolkata Knight Riders; Royal Challengers Bangalore; Delhi Daredevils; Rajasthan Royals
22	4	FA1	Jhye Richardson	Australia	Bowler	3	Capped	150	Mumbai Indians	150		Punjab Kings
23	4	FA1	Ishant Sharma	India	Bowler	93	Capped	50	Delhi Capitals	50		Kolkata Knight Riders; Deccan Chargers; Sunrisers Hyderabad; Rising Pune Supergiants; Kings XI Punjab
29	5	SP1	Adil Rashid	England	Bowler	0	Capped	200	Sunrisers Hyderabad	200		Punjab Kings
27	5	SP1	Mayank Markande	India	Bowler	20	Capped	50	Sunrisers Hyderabad	50	Mumbai Indians	Rajasthan Royals
35	6	UBA1	Shaik Rasheed	India	Batsman	0	Uncapped	20	Chennai Super Kings	20		
41	7	UAL1	Vivrant Sharma	India	All-rounder	0	Uncapped	20	Sunrisers Hyderabad	260		
45	7	UAL1	Samarth Vyas	India	All-rounder	0	Uncapped	20	Sunrisers Hyderabad	20		
43	7	UAL1	Sanvir Singh	India	All-rounder	0	Uncapped	20	Sunrisers Hyderabad	20		
42	7	UAL1	Nishant Sindhu	India	All-rounder	0	Uncapped	20	Chennai Super Kings	60		
50	8	UWK1	N Jagadeesan	India	Wicket-keeper	7	Uncapped	20	Kolkata Knight Riders	90	Chennai Super Kings	
46	8	UWK1	K. S. Bharat	India	Wicket-keeper	10	Uncapped	20	Gujarat Titans	120	Delhi Capitals	Royal Challengers Bangalore
52	8	UWK1	Upendra Yadav	India	Wicket-keeper	0	Uncapped	20	Sunrisers Hyderabad	25		
53	9	UFA1	Vaibhav Arora	India	Bowler	5	Uncapped	20	Kolkata Knight Riders	60	Punjab Kings	Kolkata Knight Riders
58	9	UFA1	Yash Thakur	India	Bowler	0	Uncapped	20	Lucknow Super Giants	45		
56	9	UFA1	Shivam Mavi	India	Bowler	32	Uncapped	40	Gujarat Titans	600	Kolkata Knight Riders	
55	9	UFA1	Mukesh Kumar	India	Bowler	0	Uncapped	20	Delhi Capitals	550		
65	10	USP1	Himanshu Sharma	India	Bowler	0	Uncapped	20	Royal Challengers Bangalore	20		
69	11	BA2	Manish Pandey	India	Batsman	160	Capped	100	Delhi Capitals	240	Lucknow Super Giants	Mumbai Indians; Royal Challengers Bangalore; Pune Warriors India; Kolkata Knight Riders; Sunrisers Hyderabad
67	11	BA2	Will Jacks	England	Batsman	0	Capped	150	Royal Challengers Bangalore	320		
80	12	AL2	Romario Shepherd	West Indies	All-rounder	3	Capped	50	Lucknow Super Giants	50	Sunrisers Hyderabad	
78	12	AL2	Daniel Sams	Australia	All-rounder	16	Capped	75	Lucknow Super Giants	75	Mumbai Indians	Delhi Capitals; Royal Challengers Bangalore
83	13	FA2	Kyle Jamieson	New Zealand	Bowler	9	Capped	100	Chennai Super Kings	100	Royal Challengers Bangalore	
94	^{[ACC-1]}		Piyush Chawla	India	Bowler	165	Capped	50	Mumbai Indians	50		Kings XI Punjab; Kolkata Knight Riders; Chennai Super Kings; Mumbai Indians
95	^{[ACC-1]}		Amit Mishra	India	Bowler	154	Capped	50	Lucknow Super Giants	50		Deccan Chargers; Sunrisers Hyderabad; Delhi Capitals
99	^{[ACC-1]}		Harpreet Singh Bhatia	India	Batsman	4	Uncapped	20	Punjab Kings	40		Kolkata Knight Riders; Pune Warriors India; Royal Challengers Bangalore
108	^{[ACC-1]}		Manoj Bhandage	India	All-rounder	0	Uncapped	20	Royal Challengers Bangalore	20		
110	^{[ACC-1]}		Mayank Dagar	India	All-rounder	0	Uncapped	20	Sunrisers Hyderabad	180		Kings XI Punjab
111	^{[ACC-1]}		Duan Jansen	South Africa	All-rounder	0	Uncapped	20	Mumbai Indians	20		
113	^{[ACC-1]}		Prerak Mankad	India	All-rounder	0	Uncapped	20	Lucknow Super Giants	180	Punjab Kings	
119	^{[ACC-1]}		Donavon Ferreira	South Africa	Wicket-Keeper	0	Uncapped	20	Rajasthan Royals	20		
123	^{[ACC-1]}		Urvil Patel	India	Wicket-Keeper	0	Uncapped	20	Gujarat Titans	20		
126	^{[ACC-1]}		Vishnu Vinod	India	Wicket-Keeper	3	Uncapped	20	Mumbai Indians	20	Sunrisers Hyderabad	Royal Challengers Bangalore; Delhi Capitals
129	^{[ACC-1]}		Vidwath Kaverappa	India	Bowler	0	Uncapped	20	Punjab Kings	20		
130	^{[ACC-1]}		Rajan Kumar	India	Bowler	0	Uncapped	20	Royal Challengers Bangalore	20		
145	^{[ACC-1]}		Suyash Sharma	India	Bowler	0	Uncapped	20	Kolkata Knight Riders	20		
170	^{[ACC-1]}		Josh Little	Ireland	Bowler	0	Capped	50	Gujarat Titans	440		
172	^{[ACC-1]}		Mohit Sharma	India	Bowler	86	Capped	50	Gujarat Titans	50		Kings XI Punjab; Chennai Super Kings; Delhi Capitals
189	^{[ACC-1]}		Shams Mulani	India	All-rounder	0	Uncapped	20	Mumbai Indians	20		Delhi Capitals
193	^{[ACC-1]}		Swapnil Singh	India	All-rounder	5	Uncapped	20	Lucknow Super Giants	20		Mumbai Indians; Kings XI Punjab
196	^{[ACC-1]}		David Wiese	Namibia	All-rounder	15	Associate	100	Kolkata Knight Riders	100		Royal Challengers Bangalore
208	^{[ACC-1]}		Nitish Kumar Reddy	India	Wicket-Keeper	0	Uncapped	20	Sunrisers Hyderabad	20		
221	^{[ACC-1]}		Avinash Singh	India	Bowler	0	Uncapped	20	Royal Challengers Bangalore	60		
284	^{[ACC-1]}		Kunal Rathore	India	Wicket-Keeper	0	Uncapped	20	Rajasthan Royals	20		
321	^{[ACC-1]}		Sonu Yadav	India	All-rounder	0	Uncapped	20	Royal Challengers Bangalore	20		
324	^{[ACC-1]}		Kulwant Khejroliya	India	Bowler	5	Uncapped	20	Kolkata Knight Riders	20		Mumbai Indians; Royal Challengers Bangalore
339	^{[ACC-1]}		Ajay Mandal	India	All-rounder	0	Uncapped	20	Chennai Super Kings	20		
389	^{[ACC-1]}		Mohit Rathee	India	All-rounder	0	Uncapped	20	Punjab Kings	20		
392	^{[ACC-1]}		Nehal Wadhera	India	All-rounder	0	Uncapped	20	Mumbai Indians	20		
405	^{[ACC-1]}		Bhagath Varma	India	All-rounder	0	Uncapped	20	Chennai Super Kings	20	Chennai Super Kings	
406	^{[ACC-1]}		Shivam Singh	India	All-rounder	0	Uncapped	20	Punjab Kings	20		
5	^{[ACC-2]}		Rilee Rossouw	South Africa	Batsman	5	Capped	200	Delhi Capitals	460		Royal Challengers Bangalore
15	^{[ACC-2]}		Litton Das	Bangladesh	Wicket-Keeper	0	Capped	50	Kolkata Knight Riders	50		
26	^{[ACC-2]}		Akeal Hosein	West Indies	Bowler	0	Capped	100	Sunrisers Hyderabad	100		
31	^{[ACC-2]}		Adam Zampa	Australia	Bowler	14	Capped	150	Rajasthan Royals	150		Rising Pune Supergiant; Royal Challengers Bangalore
36	^{[ACC-2]}		Anmolpreet Singh	India	Batsman	3	Uncapped	20	Sunrisers Hyderabad	20	Mumbai Indians	
54	^{[ACC-2]}		KM Asif	India	Bowler	3	Uncapped	20	Rajasthan Royals	30	Chennai Super Kings	
60	^{[ACC-2]}		Murugan Ashwin	India	Bowler	42	Uncapped	20	Rajasthan Royals	20	Mumbai Indians	Rising Pune Supergiant; Delhi Daredevils; Royal Challengers Bangalore; Punjab Kings
71	^{[ACC-2]}		Mandeep Singh	India	Batsman	108	Capped	50	Kolkata Knight Riders	50	Delhi Capitals	Kolkata Knight Riders; Royal Challengers Bangalore; Punjab Kings
117	^{[ACC-2]}		Akash Vasisht	India	All-rounder	0	Uncapped	20	Rajasthan Royals	20		
168	^{[ACC-2]}		Naveen-ul-Haq	Afghanistan	Bowler	0	Capped	50	Lucknow Super Giants	50		
187	^{[ACC-2]}		Yudhvir Singh Charak	India	Bowler	0	Uncapped	20	Lucknow Super Giants	20		Mumbai Indians
227	^{[ACC-2]}		Raghav Goyal	India	Bowler	0	Uncapped	20	Mumbai Indians	20		
340	^{[ACC-2]}		Abdul Basith	India	All-rounder	0	Uncapped	20	Rajasthan Royals	20		
4	^{[ACC-3]}		Joe Root	England	Batsman	0	Capped	100	Rajasthan Royals	100		
9	^{[ACC-3]}		Shakib al Hasan	Bangladesh	All-rounder	71	Capped	150	Kolkata Knight Riders	150		Kolkata Knight Riders; Sunrisers Hyderabad

^{ACC} ACC-1/2/3: Players who were part of accelerated bidding.

== Withdrawn players ==
Player	Nationality	Team	Auctioned/retention price	Reason	Withdrawal announcement date	Replacement player	Nationality	Replacement player's price	Replacement player's base price	Signing date	Ref.
Rishabh Pant	India	Delhi Capitals	₹16 crore (US$1.7 million)	Injury	11 January 2023	Abhishek Porel	India	₹20 lakh (US$21,000)		31 March 2023	
Prasidh Krishna	India	Rajasthan Royals	₹10 crore (US$1.0 million)	Stress fracture	17 February 2023	Sandeep Sharma	India	₹50 lakh (US$52,000)		27 March 2023	
Kyle Jamieson	New Zealand	Chennai Super Kings	₹1 crore (US$100,000)	Back injury	20 February 2023	Sisanda Magala	South Africa	₹50 lakh (US$52,000)		19 March 2023	
Jasprit Bumrah	India	Mumbai Indians	₹12 crore (US$1.2 million)	Back injury	28 February 2023	Sandeep Warrier	India	₹50 lakh (US$52,000)		31 March 2023	
Jhye Richardson	Australia	Mumbai Indians	₹1.5 crore (US$160,000)	Hamstring injury	11 March 2023	Riley Meredith	Australia	₹1.50 crore (US$160,000)		6 April 2023	
Will Jacks	England	Royal Challengers Bangalore	₹1.5 crore (US$160,000)	Muscle Injury	15 March 2023	Michael Bracewell	New Zealand	₹1 crore (US$100,000)		18 March 2023	
Jonny Bairstow	England	Punjab Kings	₹6.75 crore (US$700,000)	Foot injury	21 March 2023	Matthew Short	Australia	₹20 lakh (US$21,000)		27 March 2023	
Mukesh Choudhary	India	Chennai Super Kings	₹20 lakh (US$21,000)	Back injury	30 March 2023	Akash Singh	India	₹20 lakh (US$21,000)		30 March 2023	
Kane Williamson	New Zealand	Gujarat Titans	₹2 crore (US$210,000)	Knee Injury	1 April 2023	Dasun Shanaka	Sri Lanka	₹50 lakh (US$52,000)		4 April 2023	
Shakib Al Hasan	Bangladesh	Kolkata Knight Riders	₹1.5 crore (US$160,000)	Personal reasons	3 April 2023	Aarya Desai	India	₹20 lakh (US$21,000)		14 April 2023	
Rajat Patidar	India	Royal Challengers Bangalore	₹20 lakh (US$21,000)	Heel injury	4 April 2023	Vijaykumar Vyshak	India	₹20 lakh (US$21,000)		7 April 2023	
Shreyas Iyer	India	Kolkata Knight Riders	₹12.25 crore (US$1.3 million)	Back Injury	4 April 2023	Jason Roy	England	₹2.8 crore (US$290,000)	₹1.5 crore (US$160,000)	5 April 2023	
Raj Bawa	India	Punjab Kings	₹2 crore (US$210,000)	Left Shoulder Injury	5 April 2023	Gurnoor Brar	India	₹20 lakh (US$21,000)		5 April 2023	
Reece Topley	England	Royal Challengers Bangalore	₹1.9 crore (US$200,000)	Shoulder injury	6 April 2023	Wayne Parnell	South Africa	₹75 lakh (US$78,000)		7 April 2023	
Mayank Yadav	India	Lucknow Super Giants	₹20 lakh (US$21,000)	Injury	15 April 2023	Arpit Guleria	India	₹20 lakh (US$21,000)		15 April 2023	
Kamlesh Nagarkoti	India	Delhi Capitals	₹20 lakh (US$21,000)	Back Injury	21 April 2023	Priyam Garg	India	₹20 lakh (US$21,000)		23 April 2023	
Washington Sundar	India	Sunrisers Hyderabad	₹8.75 crore (US$910,000)	Hamstring Injury	27 April 2023						
Litton Das	Bangladesh	Kolkata Knight Riders	₹50 lakh (US$52,000)	Personal Reasons	28 April 2023	Johnson Charles	West Indies	₹50 lakh (US$52,000)		4 May 2023	
David Willey	England	Royal Challengers Bangalore	₹2 crore (US$210,000)	Injury	1 May 2023	Kedar Jadhav	India	₹1 crore (US$100,000)		1 May 2023	
Jaydev Unadkat	India	Lucknow Super Giants	₹50 lakh (US$52,000)	Left-Shoulder Injury	3 May 2023	Suryansh Shedge	India	₹20 lakh (US$21,000)		18 May 2023	
K. L. Rahul	India	Lucknow Super Giants	₹17 crore (US$1.8 million)	Hamstring Injury	3 May 2023	Karun Nair	India	₹50 lakh (US$52,000)		5 May 2023	
Mark Wood	England	Lucknow Super Giants	₹7.5 crore (US$780,000)	Personal Reasons	8 May 2023						
Jofra Archer	England	Mumbai Indians	₹8 crore (US$830,000)	Rehabilitation	9 May 2023	Chris Jordan	England	₹2 crore (US$210,000)		30 April 2023	
Josh Hazlewood	Australia	Royal Challengers Bangalore	₹7.75 crore (US$800,000)	Injury	20 May 2023						
Ben Stokes	England	Chennai Super Kings	₹16.25 crore (US$1.7 million)	International Duty	21 May 2023						

== Support staff changes ==
Team	Name	Change	Role	Notes	Ref
Chennai Super Kings	Lakshmipathy Balaji	Resigned	Bowling coach	Replaced by Dwayne Bravo	
Chennai Super Kings	Dwayne Bravo	Appointed	Bowling coach	Replaced Lakshmipathy Balaji	
Delhi Capitals	Sourav Ganguly	Appointed	Director of cricket		
Gujarat Titans	Naeem Amin	Appointed	Assistant coach		
Kolkata Knight Riders	Brendon McCullum	Resigned	Head coach	Replaced by Chandrakant Pandit	
Kolkata Knight Riders	Chandrakant Pandit	Appointed	Head coach	Replaced Brendon McCullum	
Kolkata Knight Riders	James Foster	Promoted as assistant coach	Fielding coach	Replaced by Ryan ten Doeschate	
Kolkata Knight Riders	Ryan ten Doeschate	Appointed	Fielding coach	Replaced James Foster	
Lucknow Super Giants	Gautam Gambhir	Promoted as global mentor			
Lucknow Super Giants	Andy Bichel	Resigned	Bowling coach	Replaced by Morné Morkel	
Lucknow Super Giants	Richard Halsall	Resigned	Fielding coach	Replaced by Jonty Rhodes	
Lucknow Super Giants	Morné Morkel	Appointed	Fast Bowling coach	Replaced Andy Bichel	
Lucknow Super Giants	Jonty Rhodes	Appointed	Fielding coach	Replaced Richard Halsall	
Lucknow Super Giants	Pravin Tambe	Appointed	Spin Bowling coach		
Mumbai Indians	Zaheer Khan	Promoted as global head of cricket development	Director of cricket operations		
Mumbai Indians	Mahela Jayawardene	Promoted as global head of performance	Head coach	Replaced by Mark Boucher	
Mumbai Indians	Mark Boucher	Appointed	Head coach	Replaced Mahela Jayawardene	
Mumbai Indians	Robin Singh	Resigned	Batting coach	Replaced by Kieron Pollard	
Mumbai Indians	Kieron Pollard	Appointed	Batting coach	Replaced Robin Singh	
Mumbai Indians	J. Arunkumar	Appointed	Assistant batting coach		
Mumbai Indians	Brad Hogg	Appointed	Spin bowling consultant		
Punjab Kings	Anil Kumble	Resigned	Head coach and the director of cricket operations	Replaced by Trevor Bayliss	
Punjab Kings	Jonty Rhodes	Resigned	Assistant coach	Replaced by Brad Haddin	
Punjab Kings	Damien Wright	Resigned	Fast bowling coach	Replaced by Charl Langeveldt	
Punjab Kings	Trevor Bayliss	Appointed	Head coach	Replaced Anil Kumble	
Punjab Kings	Brad Haddin	Appointed	Assistant coach	Replaced Jonty Rhodes	
Punjab Kings	Julian Wood	Resigned	Batting coach	Replaced by Wasim Jaffer	
Punjab Kings	Wasim Jaffer	Appointed	Batting coach	Replaced Julian Wood	
Punjab Kings	Charl Langeveldt	Appointed	Fast bowling coach	Replaced Damien Wright	
Punjab Kings	Sunil Joshi	Appointed	Spin bowling coach		
Sunrisers Hyderabad	Tom Moody	Resigned	Head coach	Replaced by Brian Lara	
Sunrisers Hyderabad	Brian Lara	Promoted as head coach	Batting coach	Replaced Tom Moody	
Sunrisers Hyderabad	Hemang Badani	Promoted as batting coach	Fielding coach	Replaced Brian Lara	
Sunrisers Hyderabad	Ryan Cook	Appointed	Fielding coach	Replaced Hemang Badani	

== See also ==
- Controversies involving the Indian Premier League
