= 2022 Rajasthan Royals season =

Indian Premier League cricket team season

Rajasthan Royals
2022 season
- Coach: Kumar Sangakkara
- Captain: Sanju Samson
- Ground(s): Sawai Mansingh Stadium
- 2022 Indian Premier League: Runner Up
- Most runs: Jos Buttler (863)
- Most wickets: Yuzvendra Chahal (27)
- Most catches: Riyan Parag (17)
- Most wicket-keeping dismissals: Sanju Samson (16)

Rajasthan Royals (RR) is a franchise cricket team based in Rajasthan, India, which has played in the Indian Premier League (IPL) since the first edition of the tournament in 2008. They were one of ten teams to compete in the 2022 Indian Premier League. The Royals have previously lifted the IPL title once, in the inaugural season.

The side finished as the runners-up in the season.

== Background ==
The franchise chose to retain three players ahead of the 2022 mega-auction.

Retained
Sanju Samson, Jos Buttler, Yashasvi Jaiswal
Released
Ben Stokes, Jofra Archer, Mahipal Lomror, Manan Vohra, Mayank Markande, Rahul Tewatia, Riyan Parag, Shreyas Gopal, Robin Uthappa, Jaydev Unadkat, Anuj Rawat, Kartik Tyagi, David Miller, Andrew Tye, Shivam Dube, Chris Morris, Mustafizur Rahman, Liam Livingstone, Chetan Sakariya, Kuldip Yadav, Akash Singh, K. C. Carriapa
Acquired at the auction
Ravichandran Ashwin, Trent Boult, Devdutt Padikkal, Shimron Hetmyer, Prasidh Krishna, Yuzvendra Chahal, Riyan Parag, KC Cariappa, Navdeep Saini, Obed McCoy, Anunay Singh, Kuldeep Sen, Karun Nair, Dhruv Jurel, Tejas Baroka, Kuldip Yadav, Shubham Garhwal, James Neesham, Nathan Coulter-Nile, Rassie van der Dussen, Daryl Mitchell

== Squad ==
- Players with international caps are listed in **bold**.

No.	Name	Nationality	Birth date	Batting style	Bowling style	Year signed	Notes
Captain
11	**Sanju Samson**	India	11 November 1994 (aged 27)	Right-handed	Right-arm off-spin	2018	
Batters
6	Shubham Garhwal	India	14 May 1995 (aged 26)	Left-handed	Left-arm orthodox	2022	
19	Yashasvi Jaiswal	India	28 December 2001 (aged 20)	Left-handed	Right-arm leg break	2020	
37	**Devdutt Padikkal**	India	7 July 2000 (aged 21)	Left-handed	Right-arm off break	2022	
47	**Daryl Mitchell**	New Zealand	20 May 1991 (aged 30)	Right-handed	Right-arm medium-fast	2022	Overseas
69	**Karun Nair**	India	6 December 1991 (aged 30)	Right-handed	Right-arm off break	2022	
72	**Rassie van der Dussen**	South Africa	7 February 1989 (aged 33)	Right-handed	Right-arm leg break	2022	Overseas
189	**Shimron Hetmyer**	West Indies	26 December 1996 (aged 25)	Left-handed	Leg break	2022	Overseas
All-rounders
5	Riyan Parag	India	10 November 2001 (aged 20)	Right-handed	Leg break	2019	
50	**Jimmy Neesham**	New Zealand	17 September 1990 (aged 31)	Left-handed	Right-arm medium-fast	2022	Overseas
-	Corbin Bosch	South Africa	10 September 1994 (aged 27)	Right-handed	Right-arm medium-fast	2022	Overseas; Replacement for Nathan Coulter-Nile
Wicket-keepers
21	Dhruv Jurel	India	21 January 2001 (aged 21)	Right-handed	Right-arm medium-fast	2022	
63	**Jos Buttler**	England	8 September 1990 (aged 31)	Right-handed	–	2018	Overseas
Spin bowlers
3	**Yuzvendra Chahal**	India	23 July 1990 (aged 31)	Right-handed	Right-arm leg break	2022	
28	Tejas Baroka	India	1 February 1996 (aged 26)	Right-handed	Leg break googly	2022	
94	K. C. Cariappa	India	13 April 1994 (aged 27)	Right-handed	Leg break	2022	
99	**Ravichandran Ashwin**	India	17 September 1986 (aged 35)	Right-handed	Right-arm off break	2022	
Pace bowlers
7	**Nathan Coulter-Nile**	Australia	11 October 1987 (aged 34)	Right-handed	Right-arm medium-fast	2022	Overseas; Ruled out due to calf injury
13	Anunay Singh	India	3 January 1993 (aged 29)	Right-handed	Right-arm medium-fast	2022	
15	Kuldip Yadav	India	15 October 1996 (aged 25)	Left-handed	Left-arm medium-fast	2021	
18	**Trent Boult**	New Zealand	22 July 1989 (aged 32)	Right-handed	Left-arm medium-fast	2022	Overseas
22	Kuldeep Sen	India	22 October 1996 (aged 25)	Right-handed	Right-arm medium-fast	2022	
24	**Prasidh Krishna**	India	19 February 1996 (aged 26)	Right-handed	Right-arm medium-fast	2022	
68	**Obed McCoy**	West Indies	4 January 1997 (aged 25)	Left-handed	Left-arm medium-fast	2022	Overseas
96	**Navdeep Saini**	India	23 November 1992 (aged 29)	Right-handed	Right-arm medium-fast	2022	
Source: RR Players

== Administration and support staff ==
Position	Name
CEO	Jake Lush McCrum
Team Manager	Romi Bhinder
Head coach and Director of cricket	Kumar Sangakkara
Development and performance director	Zubin Bharucha
Assistant coach	Trevor Penney
Batting coach	Amol Mazumdar
Spin bowling coach	Sairaj Bahutule
Fast bowling coach	Lasith Malinga
High performance fast bowling coach	Steffan Jones
Fielding coach	Dishant Yagnik

== Kit manufacturers and sponsors ==
Kit manufacturer	Shirt sponsor (chest)	Shirt sponsor (back)	Chest branding	Sleeve sponsor (left)	Sleeve sponsor (right)
Alcis	Happilo	BKT	Dollar	Red Bull	Jio
Source: RR Sponsors Archived 1 March 2022 at the Wayback Machine

T20 uniform

== Teams and standings ==
=== Points table ===
Pos	Grp	Team	Pld	W	L	NR	Pts	NRR	Qualification
1	B	Gujarat Titans (C)	14	10	4	0	20	0.316	Advanced to Qualifier 1
2	A	Rajasthan Royals (R)	14	9	5	0	18	0.298	Advanced to Qualifier 1
3	A	Lucknow Super Giants (4th)	14	9	5	0	18	0.251	Advanced to Eliminator
4	B	Royal Challengers Bangalore (3rd)	14	8	6	0	16	−0.253	Advanced to Eliminator
5	A	Delhi Capitals	14	7	7	0	14	0.204	
6	B	Punjab Kings	14	7	7	0	14	0.126	
7	A	Kolkata Knight Riders	14	6	8	0	12	0.146	
8	B	Sunrisers Hyderabad	14	6	8	0	12	−0.379	
9	B	Chennai Super Kings	14	4	10	0	8	−0.203	
10	A	Mumbai Indians	14	4	10	0	8	−0.506	

Source: IPLT20.com
(C) Champions; (R) Runners-up
The four top-ranked teams qualified for the playoffs.

== Group fixtures ==
Match 5
29 March 2022
19:30 (N)
Scorecard

Rajasthan Royals; 210/6 (20 overs)	v	Sunrisers Hyderabad; 149/7 (20 overs)
Sanju Samson 55 (27); Umran Malik 2/39 (4 overs)		Aiden Markram 57* (41); Yuzvendra Chahal 3/22 (4 overs)

Rajasthan Royals won by 61 runs
MCA International Stadium, Pune
Umpires: Ulhas Gandhe (Ind) and Bruce Oxenford (Aus)
Player of the match: Sanju Samson (Rajasthan Royals)

- Sunrisers Hyderabad won the toss and elected to field.

Match 9
2 April 2022
15:30 (D/N)
Scorecard

Rajasthan Royals; 193/8 (20 overs)	v	Mumbai Indians; 170/8 (20 overs)
Jos Buttler 100 (68); Jasprit Bumrah 3/17 (4 overs)		Ishan Kishan 54 (43); Yuzvendra Chahal 2/26 (4 overs)

Rajasthan Royals won by 23 runs
DY Patil Stadium, Navi Mumbai
Umpires: Nitin Menon (Ind) and Pashchim Pathak (Ind)
Player of the match: Jos Buttler (Rajasthan Royals)

- Mumbai Indians won the toss and elected to field.

Match 13
5 April 2022
19:30 (N)
Scorecard

Rajasthan Royals; 169/3 (20 overs)	v	Royal Challengers Bangalore; 173/6 (19.1 overs)
Jos Buttler 70* (47); Harshal Patel 1/18 (4 overs)		Shahbaz Ahmed 45 (26); Yuzvendra Chahal 2/15 (4 overs)

Royal Challengers Bangalore won by 4 wickets
Wankhede Stadium, Mumbai
Umpires: Anil Chaudhary (Ind) and Saiyed Khalid (Ind)
Player of the match: Dinesh Karthik (Royal Challengers Bangalore)

- Royal Challengers Bangalore won the toss and elected to field.

Match 20
10 April 2022
19:30 (N)
Scorecard

Rajasthan Royals; 165/6 (20 overs)	v	Lucknow Super Giants; 162/8 (20 overs)
Shimron Hetmyer 59* (36); Krishnappa Gowtham 2/30 (4 overs)		Marcus Stoinis 38* (17); Yuzvendra Chahal 4/41 (4 overs)

Rajasthan Royals won by 3 runs
Wankhede Stadium, Mumbai
Umpires: Anil Chaudhary (Ind) and Tapan Sharma (Ind)
Player of the match: Yuzvendra Chahal (Rajasthan Royals)

- Lucknow Super Giants won the toss and elected to field.

Match 24
14 April 2022
19:30 (N)
Scorecard

Gujarat Titans; 192/4 (20 overs)	v	Rajasthan Royals; 155/9 (20 overs)
Hardik Pandya 87* (52); Riyan Parag 1/12 (1 over)		Jos Buttler 54 (24); Lockie Ferguson 3/23 (4 overs)

Gujarat Titans won by 37 runs
DY Patil Stadium, Navi Mumbai
Umpires: Chris Gaffaney (NZ) and Rohan Pandit (Ind)
Player of the match: Hardik Pandya (Gujarat Titans)

- Rajasthan Royals won the toss and elected to field.

Match 30
18 April 2022
19:30 (N)
Scorecard

Rajasthan Royals; 217/5 (20 overs)	v	Kolkata Knight Riders; 210 (19.4 overs)
Jos Buttler 103 (61); Sunil Narine 2/21 (4 overs)		Shreyas Iyer 85 (51); Yuzvendra Chahal 5/40 (4 overs)

Rajasthan Royals won by 7 runs
Brabourne Stadium, Mumbai
Umpires: Sadashiv Iyer (Ind) and Virender Sharma (Ind)
Player of the match: Yuzvendra Chahal (Rajasthan Royals)

- Kolkata Knight Riders won the toss and elected to field.
- Yuzvendra Chahal (Rajasthan Royals) took a hat-trick and a five-wicket haul.

Match 34
22 April 2022
19:30 (N)
Scorecard

Rajasthan Royals; 222/2 (20 overs)	v	Delhi Capitals; 207/8 (20 overs)
Jos Buttler 116 (65); Mustafizur Rahman 1/43 (4 overs)		Rishabh Pant 44 (24); Prasidh Krishna 3/22 (4 overs)

Rajasthan Royals won by 15 runs
Wankhede Stadium, Mumbai
Umpires: Nitin Menon (Ind) and Nikhil Patwardhan (Ind)
Player of the match: Jos Buttler (Rajasthan Royals)

- Delhi Capitals won the toss and elected to field.
- The match was originally scheduled to take place at the MCA International Stadium in Pune, but it was relocated to the Wankhede Stadium after a number of COVID-19 cases in the Delhi camp.
- Jos Buttler (Rajasthan Royals) became the second player to score consecutive hundreds in the IPL, after Shikhar Dhawan. Buttler also became the second player after Virat Kohli to score three or more centuries in a single IPL season.

Match 39
26 April 2022
19:30 (N)
Scorecard

Rajasthan Royals; 144/8 (20 overs)	v	Royal Challengers Bangalore; 115 (19.3 overs)
Riyan Parag 56* (31); Josh Hazlewood 2/19 (4 overs)		Faf du Plessis 23 (21); Kuldeep Sen 4/20 (3.3 overs)

Rajasthan Royals won by 29 runs
MCA International Stadium, Pune
Umpires: K. N. Ananthapadmanabhan (Ind) and Bruce Oxenford (Aus)
Player of the match: Riyan Parag (Rajasthan Royals)

- Royal Challengers Bangalore won the toss and elected to field.

Match 44
30 April 2022
19:30 (N)
Scorecard

Rajasthan Royals; 158/6 (20 overs)	v	Mumbai Indians; 161/5 (19.2 overs)
Jos Buttler 67 (52); Riley Meredith 2/24 (4 overs)		Suryakumar Yadav 51 (39); Ravichandran Ashwin 1/21 (4 overs)

Mumbai Indians won by 5 wickets
DY Patil Stadium, Navi Mumbai
Umpires: Yeshwant Barde (Ind) and Bruce Oxenford (Aus)
Player of the match: Suryakumar Yadav (Mumbai Indians)

- Mumbai Indians won the toss and elected to field.

Match 47
2 May 2022
19:30 (N)
Scorecard

Rajasthan Royals; 152/5 (20 overs)	v	Kolkata Knight Riders; 158/3 (19.1 overs)
Sanju Samson 54 (49); Tim Southee 2/46 (4 overs)		Nitish Rana 48* (37); Trent Boult 1/25 (4 overs)

Kolkata Knight Riders won by 7 wickets
Wankhede Stadium, Mumbai
Umpires: Jayaraman Madanagopal (Ind) and Nitin Pandit (Ind)
Player of the match: Rinku Singh (Kolkata Knight Riders)

- Kolkata Knight Riders won the toss and elected to field.

Match 52
7 May 2022
15:30 (D/N)
Scorecard

Punjab Kings; 189/5 (20 overs)	v	Rajasthan Royals; 190/4 (19.4 overs)
Jonny Bairstow 56 (40); Yuzvendra Chahal 3/28 (4 overs)		Yashasvi Jaiswal 68 (41); Arshdeep Singh 4/29 (4 overs)

Rajasthan Royals won by 6 wickets
Wankhede Stadium, Mumbai
Umpires: Yeshwant Barde (Ind) and Chirra Ravikanthreddy (Ind)
Player of the match: Yashasvi Jaiswal (Rajasthan Royals)

- Punjab Kings won the toss and elected to bat.
- Mumbai Indians were eliminated as a result of this match.

Match 58
11 May 2022
19:30 (N)
Scorecard

Rajasthan Royals; 160/6 (20 overs)	v	Delhi Capitals; 161/2 (18.1 overs)
Ravichandran Ashwin 50 (38); Chetan Sakariya 2/23 (4 overs)		Mitchell Marsh 89 (62); Trent Boult 1/32 (4 overs)

Delhi Capitals won by 8 wickets
DY Patil Stadium, Navi Mumbai
Umpires: Nikhil Patwardhan (Ind) and Nitin Menon (Ind)
Player of the match: Mitchell Marsh (Delhi Capitals)

- Delhi Capitals won the toss and elected to field.

Match 63
15 May 2022
19:30 (N)
Scorecard

Rajasthan Royals; 178/6 (20 overs)	v	Lucknow Super Giants; 154/8 (20 overs)
Yashasvi Jaiswal 41 (29); Ravi Bishnoi 2/31 (4 overs)		Deepak Hooda 59 (39); Trent Boult 2/18 (4 overs)

Rajasthan Royals won by 24 runs
Brabourne Stadium, Mumbai
Umpires: Pashchim Pathak (Ind) and Tapan Sharma (Ind)
Player of the match: Trent Boult (Rajasthan Royals)

- Rajasthan Royals won the toss and elected to bat.

Match 68
20 May 2022
19:30 (N)
Scorecard

Chennai Super Kings; 150/6 (20 overs)	v	Rajasthan Royals; 151/5 (20 overs)
Moeen Ali 93 (57); Obed McCoy 2/20 (4 overs)		Yashasvi Jaiswal 59 (44); Prashant Solanki 2/20 (2 overs)

Rajasthan Royals won by 5 wickets
Brabourne Stadium, Mumbai
Umpires: Chris Gaffaney (NZ) and Nikhil Patwardhan (Ind)
Player of the match: Ravichandran Ashwin (Rajasthan Royals)

- Chennai Super Kings won the toss and elected to bat.
- Rajasthan Royals qualified for the playoffs as a result of this match.

== Playoffs ==
=== Preliminary ===
==== Qualifier 1 ====
24 May 2022
19:30 (N)
Scorecard

Rajasthan Royals; 188/6 (20 overs)	v	Gujarat Titans; 191/3 (19.3 overs)
Jos Buttler 89 (56); Hardik Pandya 1/14 (2 overs)		David Miller 68* (38); Trent Boult 1/38 (4 overs)

Gujarat Titans won by 7 wickets
Eden Gardens, Kolkata
Umpires: Bruce Oxenford (Aus) and Virender Sharma (Ind)
Player of the match: David Miller (Gujarat Titans)

- Gujarat Titans won the toss and elected to field.

==== Qualifier 2 ====
27 May 2022
19:30 (N)
Scorecard

Royal Challengers Bangalore; 157/8 (20 overs)	v	Rajasthan Royals; 161/3 (18.1 overs)
Rajat Patidar 58 (42); Prasidh Krishna 3/22 (4 overs)		Jos Buttler 106* (60); Josh Hazlewood 2/23 (4 overs)

Rajasthan Royals won by 7 wickets
Narendra Modi Stadium, Ahmedabad
Umpires: Chris Gaffaney (NZ) and Nitin Menon (Ind)
Player of the match: Jos Buttler (Rajasthan Royals)

- Rajasthan Royals won the toss and elected to field.

=== Final ===
29 May 2022
20:00 (N)
Scorecard

Rajasthan Royals; 130/9 (20 overs)	v	Gujarat Titans; 133/3 (18.1 overs)
Jos Buttler 39 (35); Hardik Pandya 3/17 (4 overs)		Shubman Gill 45* (43); Trent Boult 1/14 (4 overs)

Gujarat Titans won by 7 wickets
Narendra Modi Stadium, Ahmedabad
Umpires: Chris Gaffaney (NZ) and Nitin Menon (Ind)
Player of the match: Hardik Pandya (Gujarat Titans)

- Rajasthan Royals won the toss and elected to bat.

== Statistics ==
=== Most runs ===
No.	Name	Match	Inns	NO	Runs	HS	Ave.	BF	SR	100s	50s	0	4s	6s
1	Jos Buttler	14	14	12	629	116	48.38	428	146.96	4	4	0	56	37
2	Sanju Samson	14	14	1	374	55	28.76	254	147.24	0	2	0	35	21
3	Devdutt Padikkal	14	14	1	337	54	24.07	264	127.65	0	1	1	38	12
4	Shimron Hetmyer	12	12	7	297	59*	59.40	182	163.18	0	1	0	19	21
5	Yashasvi Jaiswal	7	7	0	212	68	30.28	157	135.03	0	2	0	26	6

- Last updated: 21 May 2022
- Source: ESPNcricinfo

=== Most wickets ===
No.	Name	Match	Inns	Overs	Maidens	Runs	Wickets	BBI	Ave.	Econ.	SR	4W	5W
1	Yuzvendra Chahal	14	14	56.0	0	430	26	5/40	16.53	7.67	12.9	1	1
2	Prasidh Krishna	14	14	55.0	3	449	15	3/22	29.93	8.16	22.0	0	0
3	Trent Boult	13	13	50.0	2	412	13	2/18	31.69	8.24	23.0	0	0
4	Ravichandran Ashwin	14	14	56.0	0	400	11	3/17	36.36	7.14	30.5	0	0
5	Kuldeep Sen	7	7	25.1	0	237	8	4/20	29.62	9.41	18.8	1	0

- Last updated: 21 May 2022
- Source: ESPNcricinfo

== Player of the match awards ==
No.	Date	Player	Opponent	Result	Contribution	Ref.
1	29 March 2022	Sanju Samson	Sunrisers Hyderabad	Won by 61 runs	55 (27)	
2	2 April 2022	Jos Buttler	Mumbai Indians	Won by 23 runs	100 (68)	
3	10 April 2022	Yuzvendra Chahal	Lucknow Super Giants	Won by 3 runs	4/41 (4 overs)	
4	18 April 2022	Yuzvendra Chahal	Kolkata Knight Riders	Won by 7 runs	5/40 (4 overs)	
5	22 April 2022	Jos Buttler	Delhi Capitals	Won by 15 runs	116 (65)	
6	26 April 2022	Riyan Parag	Royal Challengers Bangalore	Won by 29 runs	56* (31)	
7	7 May 2022	Yashasvi Jaiswal	Delhi Capitals	Won by 6 wickets	68 (41)	
8	15 May 2022	Trent Boult	Lucknow Super Giants	Won by 24 runs	2/18 (4 overs)	
9	20 May 2022	Ravichandran Ashwin	Chennai Super Kings	Won by 5 wickets	40* (23)	
10	27 May 2022	Jos Buttler	Royal Challengers Bangalore	Won by 7 wickets and advanced to the Finals	106* (60)	
