= Sabir Khan =

Sabir or Sabbir Khan may refer to:

- Sabir Khan (musician), Indian sarangi player
- Sabbir Khan (Bangladeshi cricketer) (born 1978), Bangladeshi cricketer
- Sabir Khan (Indian cricketer) (born 2000), Indian cricketer
- Sabbir Khan (born 1976), Indian film director
- Shabbir Khan (born 1997), Indian cricketer

== See also ==
- Sabri Khan (1927–2015)
