= Faizan Khan =

Faizan Khan can refer to:

- Faizan Khan (Indian cricketer) (born 1986), an Indian cricketer
- Faizan Khan (Pakistani cricketer) (born 1992), a Pakistani cricketer

== See also ==
- Dr. Faisal Rahman, fictional character portrayed by Arif Zakaria in the 2010 Indian film My Name Is Khan
