= Mridul =

Mridul may refer to:

- Mridul Banerjee, Indian football manager
- Mridul Wadhwa, Indian-Scottish campaigner
- Kumar Mridul, Indian cricketer
- Sandhya Mridul, Indian actress
- Siddharth Mridul, Indian judge

== See also ==
- Mridula (disambiguation)
