= West Zone cricket team =

Team representing western India

- Association: Board of Control for Cricket in India

History
- Duleep Trophy wins: 19
- Deodhar Trophy wins: 12
- Syed Mushtaq Ali Trophy wins: 0

The West Zone cricket team is a first-class cricket team that represents western India in the Duleep Trophy and Deodhar Trophy. It is a composite team of players from five first-class Indian teams from western India competing in the Ranji Trophy: Baroda, Gujarat, Maharashtra, Mumbai and Saurashtra. West Zone has the best track record of all the zones in the Duleep Trophy, as they have won the Trophy 19 times. This included four consecutive titles from 1961–1962 through to the 1964–65 season, although the third of these were shared with South Zone. Playing against South Zone at the Rajiv Gandhi Stadium in the 2009–10 Duleep Trophy final, West Zone set a new first-class record for the highest fourth innings total to win a match, scoring 541/7.

== Current squad ==
Players with international caps are listed in bold. Updated as on 23 August 2026

Name	Domestic team	Birth date	Batting Style	Bowling Style	Format	Notes
Batsmen
**Ruturaj Gaikwad**	Maharashtra	31 January 1997 (age 29)	Right-handed	Right-arm off break	First-class & List A	Captain
**Prithvi Shaw**	Maharashtra	9 November 1999 (age 26)	Right-handed	Right-arm off break	First-class & List A	
Shivalik Sharma	Baroda	28 November 1998 (age 27)	Left-handed	Right-arm leg break	First-class & List A	
Jaymeet Patel	Gujarat	17 May 2002 (age 24)	Left-handed	Left-arm medium	First-class & List A	
Jay Gohil	Saurashtra	13 December 2000 (age 25)	Right-handed	Right-arm off break	First-class & List A	
All-rounders
Shams Mulani	Mumbai	13 May 1997 (age 29)	Left-handed	Slow left-arm orthodox	First-class & List A	Vice-captain
Atit Sheth	Baroda	3 February 1996 (age 30)	Right-handed	Right-arm medium-fast	First-class & List A	
Musheer Khan	Mumbai	27 February 2005 (age 21)	Left-handed	Right-arm leg break	First-class & List A	
Tanush Kotian	Mumbai	16 October 1998 (age 27)	Right-handed	Right-arm off break	First-class & List A	
Wicket-keepers
Harvik Desai	Saurashtra	4 October 1999 (age 26)	Right-handed	-	First-class & List A	Wicket-keeper
Urvil Patel	Gujarat	17 October 1998 (age 27)	Right-handed	-	First-class & List A	Wicket-keeper
Spin Bowlers
Siddharth Desai	Gujarat	16 August 2000 (age 26)	Left-handed	Slow left-arm orthodox	First-class & List A	
Pace Bowlers
Shardul Thakur	Mumbai	16 October 1991 (age 34)	Right-handed	Right-arm medium-fast	First-class & List A	
**Tushar Deshpande**	Mumbai	15 May 1995 (age 31)	Left-handed	Right-arm medium	First-class & List A	
Mukesh Choudhary	Maharashtra	6 July 1996 (age 30)	Left-handed	Left-arm medium-fast	First-class & List A	

== Famous players from West Zone ==
- Ajit Agarkar
- Sairaj Bahutule
- Sunil Gavaskar
- Vijay Hazare
- Wasim Jaffer
- Vinod Kambli
- Saurabh Chauhan
- Vinoo Mankad
- Vijay Merchant
- Nayan Mongia
- Parthiv Patel
- Irfan Pathan
- Yusuf Pathan
- Rohit Sharma
- Sachin Tendulkar
- Zaheer Khan
- Dilip Vengsarkar
- Ravi Shastri
- Ajinkya Rahane
- Kedar Jadhav
- Hardik Pandya
- Krunal Pandya
- Jasprit Bumrah
- Suryakumar Yadav
