= Paja =

Paja may refer to:

- Paja, Iran, a village in Sari County
- Paja (given name), a Serbian masculine name
- Paja (surname)
- Paja Formation, geologic formation in Colombia
- Paja Brava, a Bolivian musical group
