= Chinna Durai =

Chinna Durai or Chinnadurai (lit. 'Little Girl' in Tamil) may refer to:

- Chinna Durai (1952 film), an Indian film
- Chinna Durai (1999 film), an Indian film
- M. Chinnadurai, an Indian politician
- Kumarason Chinnadurai or Kumar (Singaporean entertainer)
- Magendiran Chinnadurai, an Indian cricketer

== See also ==
- Little Girl (disambiguation)
