= Rohit Raj =

Indian cricketer (born 1993)

Personal information
- Born: 3 December 1993 (age 32); Jamshedpur, India
- Batting: Right handed
- Bowling: Right arm medium

Domestic team information
- Years: Team
- 2018–19: Bihar
- Source: Cricinfo, 19 September 2018

Rohit Raj (born 3 December 1993) is an Indian cricketer. He made his List A debut for Bihar in the 2018–19 Vijay Hazare Trophy on 19 September 2018.
