= Vijay Bharti =

Indian cricketer (born 1993)

Personal information
- Full name: Vijay Bharti
- Born: 26 October 1993 (age 32)
- Batting: Right-handed
- Bowling: Right-arm offbreak
- Role: Opening batsman

Domestic team information
- Years: Team
- 2018/19: Bihar
- Source: Cricinfo, 14 October 2018

Vijay Bharti (born 26 October 1993) is an Indian cricketer. He made his List A debut for Bihar in the 2018–19 Vijay Hazare Trophy on 14 October 2018. He made his Twenty20 debut for Bihar in the 2018–19 Syed Mushtaq Ali Trophy on 22 February 2019.
