= Prabhakaran Gopalakrishnan =

Indian cricketer (born 1988)

Personal information
- Full name: Prabhakaran Gopalakrishnan
- Born: 20 August 1988 (age 38); Puducherry, India
- Source: Cricinfo, 21 September 2018

Prabhakaran Gopalakrishnan (born 20 August 1988) is an Indian cricketer. He made his List A debut for Puducherry in the 2018–19 Vijay Hazare Trophy on 21 September 2018.
