= Momar Ori =

Indian cricketer (born 1989)

Personal information
- Full name: Momar Ori
- Born: 25 January 1989 (age 37)
- Source: ESPNcricinfo, 19 September 2018

Momar Ori (born 25 January 1989) is an Indian cricketer. He made his List A debut for Arunachal Pradesh in the 2018–19 Vijay Hazare Trophy on 19 September 2018.
