= Eshaan Ravi =

Indian cricketer (born 1993)

Personal information
- Born: 19 May 1993 (age 33)
- Batting: Right-handed

Domestic team information
- Years: Team
- 2018–19: Bihar
- Source: ESPNcricinfo, 14 December 2019

Eshaan Ravi (born 19 May 1993) is an Indian cricketer. He made his List A debut for Bihar in the 2018–19 Vijay Hazare Trophy on 30 September 2018. He made his Twenty20 debut on 11 November 2019, for Bihar in the 2019–20 Syed Mushtaq Ali Trophy.
