= Little Girl =

Little Girl(s), A Little Girl, or The Little Girl(s) may refer to:

- Girl, a young female human

== Film and television ==
- Little Girl (film), a 2020 French documentary by Sébastien Lifshitz
- "A Little Girl" (Dynasty), a 1984 television episode
- "The Little Girl" (13 Reasons Why), a 2018 television episode

== Literature ==
- A Little Girl Series, an 1896–1909 series of 14 juvenile novels by Amanda Minnie Douglas
- The Little Girls, a 1964 novel by Elizabeth Bowen

== Music ==
- Little Girls (band), a 2000s/10s Canadian indie rock band
- The Little Girls, a 1980s American band
- Little Girl, a 2012 album by Jing Chang

=== Songs ===
- "Little Girl" (John Lennon song), recorded 1965, released 2026
- "Little Girl" (Miwa song), 2010
- "Little Girl" (Reba McEntire song), 1989
- "Little Girl" (Sandra song), 1986
- "Little Girl" (Syndicate of Sound song), 1966
- "Little Girl (With Blue Eyes)", by Pulp, 1985
- "Little Girl (You're My Miss America)", by the Beach Boys, 1962
- "The Little Girl", by John Michael Montgomery, 2000
- "Little Girls" (Annie song), from the musical, 1977
- "Little Girls" (Oingo Boingo song), 1981
- "Little Girl", by Billy Preston from Encouraging Words, 1970
- "Little Girl", by Bo Diddley from Go Bo Diddley, 1959
- "Little Girl", by Death from Above 1979 from You're a Woman, I'm a Machine, 2004
- "Little Girl", by Dokken from Long Way Home, 2002
- "Little Girl", by Enrique Iglesias from Insomniac, 2007
- "Little Girl", by H-Blockx, 1994
- "Little Girl", by Japanese Breakfast from For Melancholy Brunettes (& Sad Women), 2025
- "Little Girl", by John Mayall from Blues Breakers with Eric Clapton, 1966
- "Little Girl", by Journey from Dream, After Dream, 1980
- "Little Girl", by Lalah Hathaway from Self Portrait, 2008
- "Little Girl", by Loverboy from Loverboy, 1980
- "Little Girl", by Mary Mary from Go Get It, 2012
- "Little Girl", by the Monkees from The Monkees Present, 1969
- "Little Girl", by Ritchie Valens from Ritchie, 1959
- "Little Girl", by Roxette from Room Service, 2001
- "Little Girl", by Them from The Angry Young Them, 1965
- "Little Girl", by the Troggs, 1968
- "Little Girl", by the Wilkinsons from Highway, 2005
- "Little Girl", written by Madeline Hyde and Francis Henry; see 1931 in music § Published popular music
- "Little Girls", by Extreme from Extreme, 1989
- "Little Girls", by Momus from Scobberlotchers, 2016
- "¿Viva La Gloria? (Little Girl)", by Green Day from 21st Century Breakdown, 2009

== See also ==
- Chinna Durai (disambiguation)
