= Somorjit Salam =

Indian cricketer (born 1994)

Personal information
- Born: 27 January 1994 (age 32); Bishnupur, Manipur
- Source: Cricinfo, 6 October 2018

Somorjit Salam (born 27 January 1994) is an Indian cricketer. He made his List A debut for Manipur in the 2018–19 Vijay Hazare Trophy on 6 October 2018. He made his Twenty20 debut on 12 November 2019, for Manipur in the 2019–20 Syed Mushtaq Ali Trophy. He made his first-class debut on 4 February 2020, for Manipur in the 2019–20 Ranji Trophy.
