= Syed Mujibur Rahaman =

Indian cricketer (born 1974)

Personal information
- Born: 1 January 1974 (age 52); Thoubal, Manipur
- Source: Cricinfo, 30 September 2018

Syed Mujibur Rahaman (born 1 January 1974) is an Indian cricketer. He made his List A debut for Manipur in the 2018–19 Vijay Hazare Trophy on 30 September 2018. He made his first-class debut for Manipur in the 2018–19 Ranji Trophy on 28 November 2018.
