= Wanlambok Nongkhlaw =

Indian cricketer (born 1993)

Personal information
- Born: 9 February 1993 (age 33)
- Batting: Left-handed
- Bowling: Left-arm medium

Domestic team information
- Years: Team
- 2018–19: Meghalaya
- Source: Cricinfo, 4 October 2018

Wanlambok Nongkhlaw (born 9 February 1993) is an Indian cricketer. He made his List A debut for Meghalaya in the 2018–19 Vijay Hazare Trophy on 4 October 2018. He made his first-class debut for Meghalaya in the 2018–19 Ranji Trophy on 6 December 2018. He made his Twenty20 debut for Meghalaya in the 2018–19 Syed Mushtaq Ali Trophy on 21 February 2019.

Outside of cricket, Nongkhlaw works for the traffic police at Shillong.
