= Rajesh Tati =

Indian cricketer (born 1995)

Personal information
- Full name: Rajesh Tati
- Born: 23 November 1995 (age 30)
- Source: Cricinfo, 20 September 2018

Rajesh Tati (born 23 November 1995) is an Indian cricketer. He made his List A debut for Meghalaya in the 2018–19 Vijay Hazare Trophy on 20 September 2018. He made his Twenty20 debut for Meghalaya in the 2018–19 Syed Mushtaq Ali Trophy on 28 February 2019.
