= Anshuman Gautam =

Indian cricketer (born 1994)

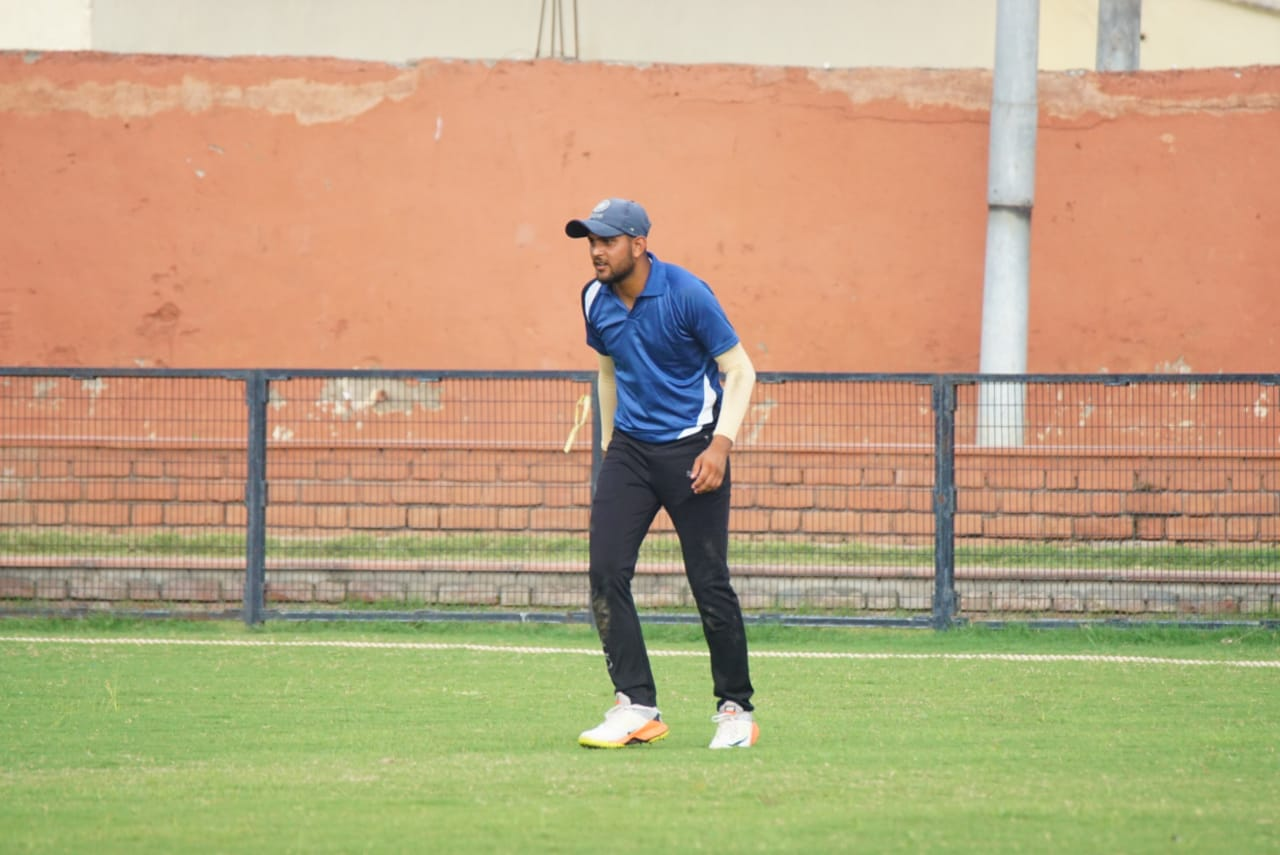

Personal information
- Born: 17 June 1994 (age 30); Patna, Bihar, India
- Batting: Right-handed
- Bowling: Slow left arm orthodox

Domestic team information
- Years: Team
- 2018–present: Bihar
- Source: ESPNcricinfo, 26 September 2018

Anshuman Gautam (born 17 June 1994) is an Indian cricketer. He made his List A debut for Bihar in the 2018–19 Vijay Hazare Trophy on 26 September 2018. He made his first-class debut for Bihar in the 2018–19 Ranji Trophy on 30 December 2018. He made his Twenty20 debut on 8 November 2019, for Bihar in the 2019–20 Syed Mushtaq Ali Trophy.
