= Ravi Maurya =

Indian cricketer (born 1997)

Personal information
- Full name: Ravi Rajendra Maurya
- Born: 18 November 1997 (age 28); Dimapur, Nagaland
- Batting: Right-handed
- Bowling: Right-arm medium

Domestic team information
- Years: Team
- 2018-Present: Nagaland
- Source: Cricinfo, 19 September 2018

Ravi Rajendra Maurya (born 18 November 1997) is an Indian cricketer. He made his List A debut for Nagaland in the 2018–19 Vijay Hazare Trophy on 19 September 2018.
