= Vaibhav Bhatt =

Indian cricketer (born 1995)

Personal information
- Born: 25 November 1995 (age 30); Haldwani, Uttarakhand, India
- Batting: Right-handed
- Role: Wicketkeeper
- Source: Cricinfo, 20 September 2018

Vaibhav Bhatt (born 25 November 1995) is an Indian cricketer. He made his List A debut for Uttarakhand in the 2018–19 Vijay Hazare Trophy on 20 September 2018. He made his first-class debut for Uttarakhand in the 2018–19 Ranji Trophy on 12 November 2018. He made his Twenty20 debut on 5 November 2021, for Uttarakhand in the 2021–22 Syed Mushtaq Ali Trophy.
