= Sai Karthik (cricketer) =

Indian cricketer (born 1997)

Personal information
- Born: 20 September 1997 (age 29); Karaikal, Puducherry, India
- Batting: Right-handed
- Bowling: Right-arm medium
- Source: ESPNcricinfo, 7 November 2019

Sai Karthik (born 20 September 1997) is an Indian cricketer. He made his List A debut for Puducherry in the 2018–19 Vijay Hazare Trophy on 4 October 2018.
