= Som Lepcha =

Indian cricketer (born 1977)

Personal information
- Full name: Som Tshering Lepcha
- Born: 15 February 1977 (age 49); Gangtok, Sikkim
- Source: Cricinfo, 20 September 2018

Som Lepcha (born 15 February 1977) is an Indian cricketer. He made his List A debut for Sikkim in the 2018–19 Vijay Hazare Trophy on 20 September 2018.
