= Rehan Khan (cricketer) =

Indian cricketer (born 1990)

Diwan Rehan Khan
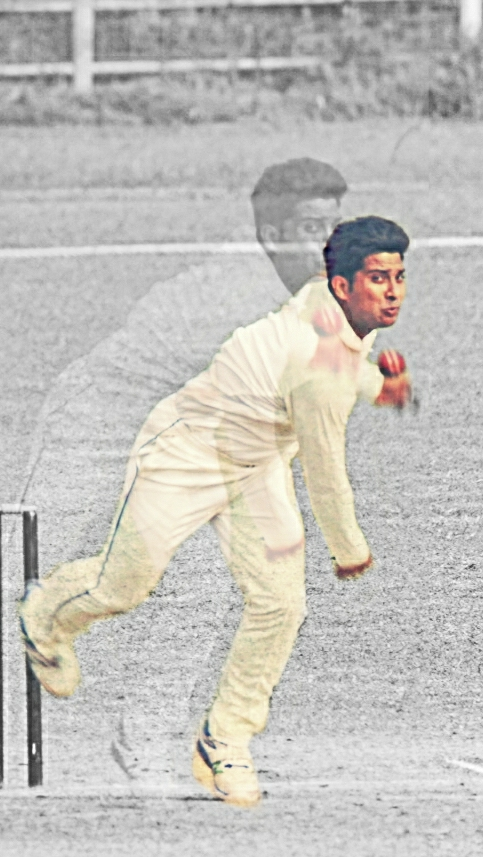

Personal information
- Full name: Diwan Rehan Khan
- Born: 8 January 1990 (age 36); Kaimur, Bihar, India
- Batting: Right-handed
- Bowling: Right-arm medium-fast
- Role: Bowler

Domestic team information
- Years: Team
- 2018: Bihar
- Source: Cricinfo, 19 September 2018

Diwan Rehan Khan (born 8 January 1990) is an Indian cricketer. He made his List A debut for Bihar in the 2018–19 Vijay Hazare Trophy on 19 September 2018. He made his first-class debut for Bihar in the 2018–19 Ranji Trophy on 6 December 2018.
