= Sandeep Kumar Thakur =

Indian cricketer (born 1993)

Personal information
- Full name: Sandeep Kumar Thakur
- Born: 1 January 1993 (age 33)
- Batting: Right-handed
- Bowling: Right arm medium

Domestic team information
- Years: Team
- 2018–19: Arunachal Pradesh
- Source: Cricinfo, 19 September 2018

Sandeep Kumar Thakur (born 1 January 1993) is an Indian cricketer. He made his List A debut for Arunachal Pradesh in the 2018–19 Vijay Hazare Trophy on 19 September 2018. He was the leading wicket-taker for Arunachal Pradesh in the 2018–19 Vijay Hazare Trophy, with eight dismissals in five matches. He made his first-class debut for Arunachal Pradesh in the 2018–19 Ranji Trophy on 1 November 2018.
