= Vaibhav Singh Panwar =

Indian cricketer (born 1992)

Personal information
- Full name: Vaibhav Singh Panwar
- Born: 26 October 1992 (age 34); Dehradun, Uttarakhand, India
- Batting: Left-handed
- Bowling: Slow left arm orthodox

Domestic team information
- Years: Team
- 2018/19: Uttarakhand
- Source: Cricinfo, 20 September 2018

Vaibhav Singh Panwar (born 26 October 1992) is an Indian cricketer who played for Uttarakhand. He made his List A debut for Uttarakhand in the 2018–19 Vijay Hazare Trophy on 20 September 2018. He made his Twenty20 debut for Uttarakhand in the 2018–19 Syed Mushtaq Ali Trophy on 21 February 2019.
