= Utsav Pankaj Madan =

Indian cricketer

Personal information
- Full name: Utsav Pankaj Madan
- Source: Cricinfo, 19 September 2018

Utsav Pankaj Madan is an Indian cricketer. He made his List A debut for Arunachal Pradesh in the 2018–19 Vijay Hazare Trophy on 19 September 2018. He made his first-class debut for Arunachal Pradesh in the 2018–19 Ranji Trophy on 22 December 2018.
