= Vikash Ranjan =

Indian cricketer (born 1994)

Personal information
- Born: 15 February 1994 (age 32); Muzaffarpur, Bihar, India
- Batting: Right-handed
- Role: Wicket-keeper

Domestic team information
- Years: Team
- 2018–: Bihar
- First-class debut: 1 November 2018 Bihar v Uttarakhand
- Last First-class: 1 November 2018 Bihar v Uttarakhand
- List A debut: 19 September 2018 Bihar v Nagaland
- Last List A: 14 October 2018 Bihar v Mumbai
- Source: Cricinfo, 19 September 2018

Vikash Ranjan (born 15 February 1994) is an Indian cricketer. He made his List A debut for Bihar in the 2018–19 Vijay Hazare Trophy on 19 September 2018. He made his first-class debut for Bihar in the 2018–19 Ranji Trophy on 1 November 2018. He made his Twenty20 debut on 11 January 2021, for Bihar in the 2020–21 Syed Mushtaq Ali Trophy.
