= Sams Alam =

Indian cricketer (born 1991)

Personal information
- Born: 7 July 1991 (age 35)
- Batting: Left-handed
- Bowling: Left-arm Medium

Domestic team information
- Years: Team
- 2018/19: Arunachal Pradesh
- Source: Cricinfo, 20 April 2023

Sams Alam (born 7 July 1991) is an Indian cricketer. He made his List A debut for Arunachal Pradesh in the 2018–19 Vijay Hazare Trophy on 28 September 2018. He made his Twenty20 debut for Arunachal Pradesh in the 2018–19 Syed Mushtaq Ali Trophy on 24 February 2019.
