= Nungleppam William Singh =

Indian cricketer (born 1992)

Personal information
- Born: 7 October 1992 (age 34); Thoubal, Manipur
- Batting: Right handed
- Bowling: Right arm offbreak

Domestic team information
- Years: Team
- 2018–19: Manipur
- Source: ESPNcricinfo, 19 September 2018

Nungleppam William Singh (born 7 October 1992) is an Indian cricketer. He made his List A debut for Manipur in the 2018–19 Vijay Hazare Trophy on 19 September 2018. He made his first-class debut for Manipur in the 2018–19 Ranji Trophy on 20 November 2018.
