= Mridula =

Mridula may refer to:

- Mridula (film), 1990 Indian Malayalam-language film
- Mridula Garg, Indian writer
- Mridula Koshy, Indian writer
- Mridula Sarabhai, Indian freedom fighter and activist
- Mridula Sinha, Hindi writer and former chairperson of the Central Social Welfare Board
- Mridula Warrier, Indian singer

== See also ==
- Mridul (disambiguation)
