= Shubham Saudiyal =

Indian cricketer (born 1995)

Personal information
- Full name: Shubham Saudiyal
- Born: 13 August 1995 (age 31)
- Batting: Left-handed
- Bowling: Left-arm fast
- Role: Bowler
- Source: Cricinfo, 26 September 2018

Shubham Saudiyal (born 13 August 1995) is an Indian cricketer. He made his List A debut for Uttarakhand in the 2018–19 Vijay Hazare Trophy on 26 September 2018.
