= Karn Kaushal =

Indian cricketer (born 1991)

Personal information
- Full name: Karn Veer Kaushal
- Born: 25 August 1991 (age 35); Dehradun, Uttarakhand, India
- Source: ESPNcricinfo, 6 October 2018

Karn Veer Kaushal (born 25 August 1991) is an Indian cricketer. He made his List A debut for Uttarakhand in the 2018–19 Vijay Hazare Trophy on 20 September 2018. In the Plate Group fixture between Uttarakhand and Sikkim, Kaushal made the first double-century in the history of the Vijay Hazare Trophy, scoring 202 runs. He was the leading run-scorer for Uttarakhand in the 2018–19 Vijay Hazare Trophy, with 489 runs in eight matches.

He made his first-class debut for Uttarakhand in the 2018–19 Ranji Trophy on 1 November 2018. He made his Twenty20 debut for Uttarakhand in the 2018–19 Syed Mushtaq Ali Trophy on 21 February 2019. He was the leading run-scorer for the team in the tournament, with 176 runs.
