= Kundan Sharma =

Indian cricketer (born 1995)

Personal information
- Born: 10 August 1995 (age 31); Puran, Bihar
- Role: Batsman

Domestic team information
- Years: Team
- 2018/19: Bihar
- Source: ESPNcricinfo, 19 September 2018

Kundan Sharma (born 10 August 1995) is an Indian cricketer. He made his List A debut for Bihar in the 2018–19 Vijay Hazare Trophy on 19 September 2018. He made his first-class debut for Bihar in the 2018–19 Ranji Trophy on 7 January 2019.
