= Faizan Khan (Indian cricketer) =

Indian cricketer (born 1986)

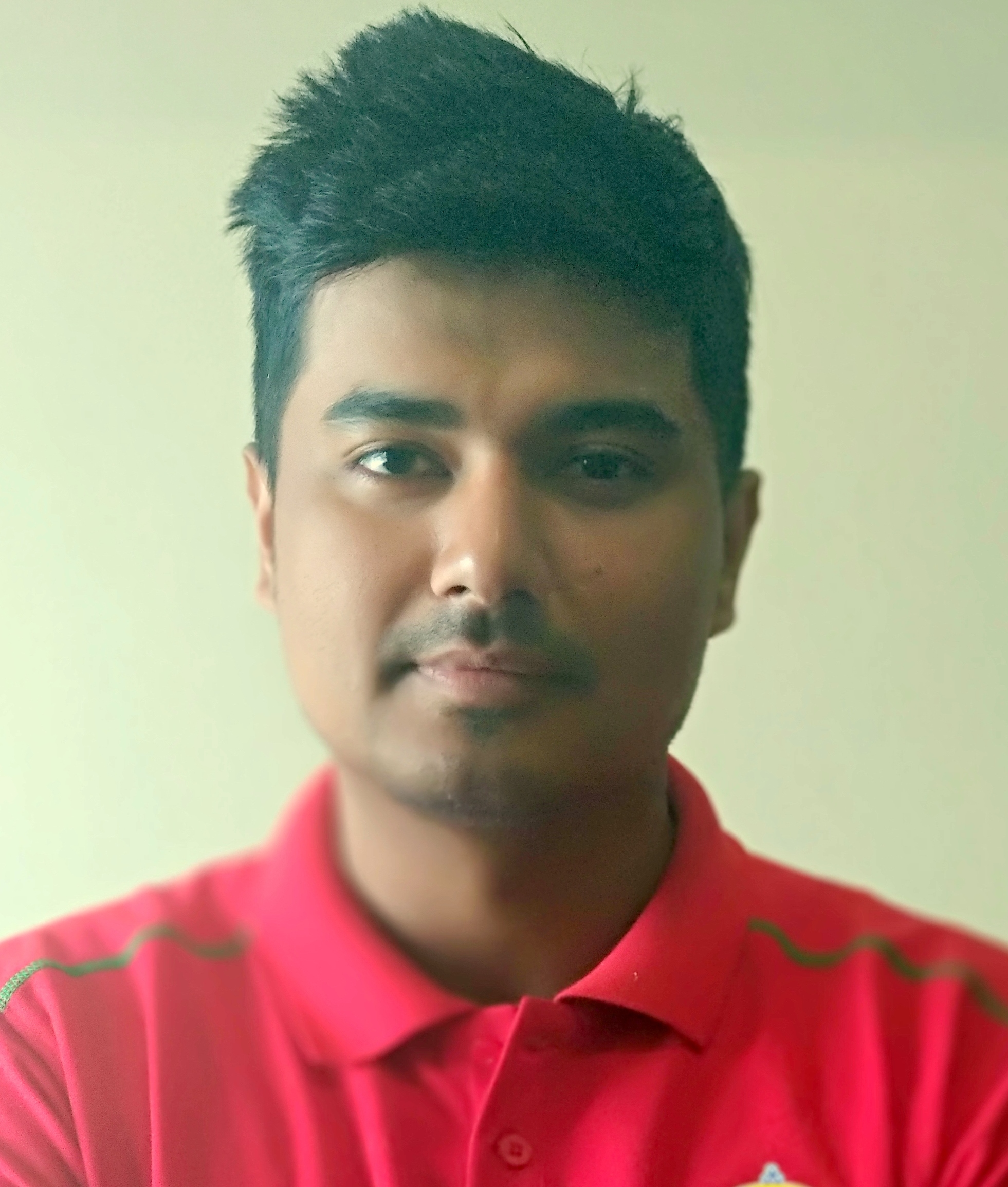

Personal information
- Full name: Faizan Khan
- Born: 30 October 1986 (age 40); Singtam, Sikkim
- Source: ESPNcricinfo, 20 September 2018

Faizan Khan (born 30 October 1986) is an Indian cricketer. He made his List A debut for sikkim in the 2018–19 Vijay Hazare Trophy on 20 September 2018. He made his first-class debut for Sikkim in the 2018–19 Ranji Trophy on 1 November 2018.
