= Kiran Reddy =

Indian cricketer (born 1996)

Personal information
- Full name: Vade Kiran Kumar Reddy
- Born: 4 December 1996 (age 29); Hyderabad
- Batting: Right handed
- Bowling: Right arm medium
- Role: All Rounder
- Source: ESPNcricinfo, 8 March 2019

Kiran Reddy (born 4 December 1996) is an Indian cricketer. He made his Twenty20 debut for Nagaland in the 2018–19 Syed Mushtaq Ali Trophy on 25 February 2019.
