= Magendiran Chinnadurai =

Indian cricketer (born 1984)

Personal information
- Full name: Magendiran Chinnadurai
- Born: 5 January 1984 (age 42); Puducherry, India
- Source: ESPNcricinfo, 2 October 2018

Magendiran Chinnadurai (born 5 January 1984) is an Indian cricketer. He made his List A debut for Pondicherry in the 2018–19 Vijay Hazare Trophy on 2 October 2018.
