= Nitesh Lohchab =

Indian cricketer (born 1992)

Personal information
- Born: 18 November 1992 (age 33); Delhi
- Source: ESPNcricinfo, 19 September 2018

Nitesh Lohchab (born 18 November 1992) is an Indian cricketer. He made his List A debut for Nagaland in the 2018–19 Vijay Hazare Trophy on 19 September 2018. He made his first-class debut for Nagaland in the 2018–19 Ranji Trophy on 1 November 2018. He made his Twenty20 debut for Nagaland in the 2018–19 Syed Mushtaq Ali Trophy on 21 February 2019.
