= Manjinder Singh =

Indian cricketer (born 1996)

Personal information
- Born: 18 March 1996 (age 30); Dimapur, Nagaland
- Batting: Right-handed
- Bowling: Right-arm slow-medium
- Role: Batting
- Source: ESPNcricinfo, 8 March 2019

Manjinder Singh (born 18 March 1996) is an Indian cricketer. He made his Twenty20 debut for Nagaland in the 2018–19 Syed Mushtaq Ali Trophy on 25 February 2019.
