= Takar Paja =

Indian cricketer (born 1994)

Personal information
- Full name: Takar Paja
- Born: 18 January 1994 (age 32)
- Source: Cricinfo, 28 September 2018

Takar Paja (born 18 January 1994) is an Indian cricketer. He made his List A debut for Arunachal Pradesh in the 2018–19 Vijay Hazare Trophy on 28 September 2018.
