= Inakato Zhimomi =

Indian cricketer (born 1992)

Personal information
- Full name: Inakato Zhimomi
- Born: 21 November 1992 (age 33); Dimapur, Nagaland, India
- Batting: Right handed
- Bowling: Right arm offbreak

Domestic team information
- Years: Team
- 2018–19: Nagaland
- Source: ESPNcricinfo, 21 September 2018

Inakato Zhimomi (born 21 November 1992) is an Indian cricketer. He made his List A debut for Nagaland in the 2018–19 Vijay Hazare Trophy on 21 September 2018. He made his first-class debut for Nagaland in the 2018–19 Ranji Trophy on 22 December 2018. He made his Twenty20 debut for Nagaland in the 2018–19 Syed Mushtaq Ali Trophy on 22 February 2019.
