= Manish Rai =

Indian cricketer (born 1993)

Personal information
- Full name: Manish Kumar Rai
- Born: 15 November 1993 (age 32); Patna, Bihar, India
- Batting: Right-handed
- Bowling: Right-arm medium fast

Domestic team information
- Years: Team
- 2018–: Bihar
- Source: ESPNcricinfo

Manish Rai (born 15 November 1993) is an Indian cricketer representing Bihar. He made his List A debut against Mizoram on 8 October 2018. He is the 83rd player to play for Bihar in the 25 years-old tournament. Earlier this tournament was started as Ranji One Day Trophy in 1993. From 2007 to 2008 tournament, the name was changed to Vijay Hazare Trophy.
