= Shaik Ismail =

Indian cricketer (born 2002)

Personal information
- Born: 25 April 2002 (age 24)
- Source: Cricinfo, 22 February 2019

Shaik Ismail (born 25 April 2002) is an Indian cricketer. He made his Twenty20 debut for Andhra in the 2018–19 Syed Mushtaq Ali Trophy on 22 February 2019.
