= Kumar Mridul =

Indian cricketer (born 1988)

Personal information
- Born: 5 October 1988 (age 38)

Domestic team information
- Years: Team
- 2018: Bihar
- Source: ESPNcricinfo, 4 October 2018

Kumar Mridul (born 5 October 1988) is an Indian cricketer. He made his List A debut for Bihar in the 2018–19 Vijay Hazare Trophy on 4 October 2018.
