= Rohit Jhanjhariya =

Indian cricketer (born 1990)

Personal information
- Born: 18 August 1990 (age 36)
- Source: Cricinfo, 21 February 2019

Rohit Jhanjhariya (born 18 August 1990) is an Indian cricketer. He made his Twenty20 debut for Nagaland in the 2018–19 Syed Mushtaq Ali Trophy on 21 February 2019.
