= Suboth Bhati =

Indian cricketer (born 1990)

Suboth Bhati Gurjar
Personal information
- Full name: Subodh Bhati Gurjar
- Born: 29 September 1990 (age 36); Uttar Pradesh, India
- Source: Cricinfo, 2 November 2015

Suboth Bhati (born 29 September 1990) is an Indian cricketer who played for Delhi and Pondicherry. He made his first-class debut on 30 October in the 2015–16 Ranji Trophy. He made his List A debut on 10 December 2015 in the 2015–16 Vijay Hazare Trophy. He made his Twenty20 debut on 2 January 2016 in the 2015–16 Syed Mushtaq Ali Trophy.

In July 2021, Bhati scored a double century in a club T20 tournament against Simba, scoring an unbeaten 205 in just 79 balls. It was Subodh's second double century in T20 cricket. Previously, he did this while playing for Sanguem Cricketers.
