= Sabir Khan (Indian cricketer) =

Indian cricketer (born 2000)

Personal information
- Born: 24 November 2000 (age 25); Motihari, Bihar
- Batting: Right-handed
- Bowling: right hand pacer
- Role: Bowler

Domestic team information
- Years: Team
- 2018-present: Bihar (squad no. Rcb net. bowler)
- Source: Cricinfo, 14 October 2018

Sabir Khan (born 24 November 2000) is an Indian cricketer. He made his List A debut for Bihar in the 2018–19 Vijay Hazare Trophy on 14 October 2018. He made his first-class debut on 9 December 2019, for Bihar in the 2019–20 Ranji Trophy.
