= Saurabh Chauhan =

Indian cricketer

Personal information
- Full name: Saurabh Chauhan
- Source: Cricinfo, 6 October 2018

Saurabh Chauhan is an Indian cricketer. He made his List A debut for Uttarakhand in the 2018–19 Vijay Hazare Trophy on 6 October 2018.
