= Jatin Wadhwan =

Indian cricketer (born 1994)

Personal information
- Full name: Jatin Satish Wadhwan
- Born: 15 September 1994 (age 31); Jammu, Jammu and Kashmir, India
- Batting: Right-hand
- Bowling: Right-arm medium
- Role: Batsman

Domestic team information
- Years: Team
- 2016–present: Jammu & Kashmir
- Source: ESPNcricinfo

Jatin Wadhwan (born 15 September 1994) is an Indian cricketer. He made his Twenty20 debut for Jammu & Kashmir in the 2015–16 Syed Mushtaq Ali Trophy on 10 January 2016.

He later made his List A debut for the team in the 2017–18 Vijay Hazare Trophy on 8 February 2018, followed by his first-class debut on 17 February 2022 in the 2021–22 Ranji Trophy.
