= Rahul Sharma (cricketer, born 1996) =

Indian cricketer (born 1996)

Personal information
- Born: 21 December 1996 (age 29)
- Source: Cricinfo, 21 February 2019

Rahul Sharma (born 21 December 1996) is an Indian cricketer. He made his Twenty20 debut for Nagaland in the 2018–19 Syed Mushtaq Ali Trophy on 21 February 2019.
