= K. C. Cariappa (cricketer) =

Indian cricketer

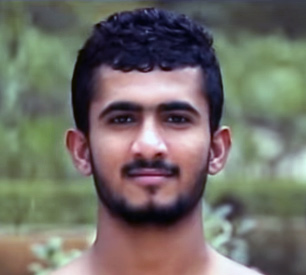
- K. C. Cariappa in an ad, during IPL 2015

Personal information
- Full name: Konganda Charamanna Cariappa
- Born: 13 April 1994 (age 32); Bangalore, Karnataka, India
- Nickname: Carri
- Height: 6 ft 0 in (1.83 m)
- Batting: Right-handed
- Bowling: Leg break
- Role: Bowler

Domestic team information
- Years: Team
- 2015: Kolkata Knight Riders
- 2015–2022: Karnataka
- 2016–2017: Kings XI Punjab
- 2019: Kolkata Knight Riders
- 2023–2026: Mizoram
- Source: ESPNcricinfo

Konganda Charamanna Cariappa (born 13 April 1994), commonly known as K.C. Cariappa, is a former Indian professional cricketer. He announced his retirement from Indian cricket in January 2026.

== Playing style ==
KC Cariappa is a mystery spinner who bowls leg spin, whose stock delivery is the leg break. He has variations such as the googly, the quicker ball, the carrom ball as well as the off break which he bowls without changing the grip.

== Career ==
Cariappa started playing cricket at the age of 17 as fast bowling all-rounder, but later switched to spin bowling.

In 2014, Cariappa played for the Karnataka Under-19 team and Bijapur Bulls in the Karnataka Premier League (KPL). He finished as the third-highest wicket-taker at the KPL and grabbed the attention of a few IPL scouts during the tournament. He was included in Karnataka's 30-man probable squad for Ranji Trophy, but was not selected in the final squad. In September 2014, he was asked to bowl in the trials for Kolkata Knight Riders (KKR) during a training camp in Hyderabad before the start of 2014 Champions League Twenty20. The captain of KKR, Gautam Gambhir failed to read his bowling during the trials, and the team management asked Cariappa to sign-up for the 2015 IPL auction.

In February 2015, Cariappa was bought by KKR at the IPL auction for ₹24 million (US$260,000), an unusually high amount as Cariappa had not played any form of top-level cricket before he was signed-up by the Knight Riders. The managing director and CEO of Kolkata Knight Riders, Venky Mysore responded after the auction, "Some of the top players that we have including the legendary Kallis found him (Cariappa) to be very unusual and extremely good, and we decided to give him a shot." He made his senior cricket debut during the 2015 IPL for the Knight Riders against the Royal Challengers Bangalore on 11 April 2015 and picked up the wicket of AB de Villiers. This was the only time he played for them that season. He was released from their squad the very next season. At the next auction, he was picked up by Kings XI Punjab for a lower price of ₹8 million (US$85,000).

In 2019, he returned to Kolkata Knight Riders as a replacement when Shivam Mavi got injured. He was released by the Kolkata Knight Riders ahead of the 2020 IPL auction. In February 2021, Cariappa was bought by the Rajasthan Royals in the IPL auction ahead of the 2021 Indian Premier League.

He made his List A debut on 8 December 2021, for Karnataka in the 2021–22 Vijay Hazare Trophy. In February 2022, he was bought back by the Rajasthan Royals in the auction for the 2022 Indian Premier League tournament, after having been released before the auction.
