= Anunay Singh =

Indian cricketer (born 1993)

Personal information
- Full name: Anunay Narayan Singh
- Born: 3 January 1993 (age 33); Vaishali, Bihar, India
- Batting: Right-handed
- Bowling: Right-arm medium-fast
- Role: Bowler

Domestic team information
- Years: Team
- 2018–2022: Bihar
- Only First-class: 1 November 2018 Bihar v Uttarakhand
- List A debut: 19 September 2018 Bihar v Nagaland
- Last List A: 14 October 2018 Bihar v Mumbai

Career statistics
Competition	FC	LA	T20
Matches	1	8	3
Runs scored	36	11	-
Batting average	18	11	-
100s/50s	0/0	0/0	0/0
Top score	35	7	-
Balls bowled	66	306	43
Wickets	1	10	1
Bowling average	32.00	17.70	58.00
5 wickets in innings	0	0	0
10 wickets in match	0	0	0
Best bowling	1/32	3/12	1/32
Catches/stumpings	0/0	0/0	0/0
- Source: ESPNcricinfo, 23 May 2024

Anunay Narayan Singh (born 3 January 1993) is an Indian cricketer who represented Bihar in domestic cricket and Rajasthan Royals in Indian Premier League (IPL). He is a right-handed batter and right-arm medium-fast bowler.

He made his List A debut for Bihar in the 2018–19 Vijay Hazare Trophy on 19 September 2018. He made his first-class debut for Bihar in the 2018–19 Ranji Trophy on 1 November 2018. He made his Twenty20 debut on 9 November 2021, for Bihar in the 2021–22 Syed Mushtaq Ali Trophy.

In February 2022, he was bought by the Rajasthan Royals in the auction for the 2022 Indian Premier League tournament.
