= Tejas Baroka =

Indian cricketer (born 1996)

Personal information
- Born: 1 February 1996 (age 30); Pondicherry, India
- Batting: Right-handed
- Bowling: Leg break googly
- Role: Bowler

Domestic team information
- Years: Team
- 2017: Gujarat Lions
- 2019–2021: Delhi
- Source: ESPNcricinfo, 9 April 2017

Tejas Baroka (born 1 February 1996) is an Indian cricketer who plays for Delhi.

== Career ==
In February 2017, Baroka was bought by the Gujarat Lions team for the 2017 Indian Premier League for 10 lakhs. He made his Twenty20 debut for Gujarat Lions in the 2017 Indian Premier League on 9 April 2017. He made his first-class debut on 9 December 2019, for Delhi in the 2019–20 Ranji Trophy. He made his List A debut on 12 December 2021, for Delhi in the 2021–22 Vijay Hazare Trophy.

In February 2022, he was bought by the Rajasthan Royals in the auction for the 2022 Indian Premier League tournament.
