= 2018–19 Vijay Hazare Trophy =

Indian cricket tournament

- Dates: 19 September – 20 October 2018
- Administrator(s): BCCI
- Cricket format: List A cricket
- Tournament format(s): Round-robin and Playoff format
- Host(s): Various
- Champions: Mumbai (3rd title)
- Runners-up: Delhi
- Participants: 37
- Matches: 160
- Most runs: Abhinav Mukund (560) (Tamil Nadu)
- Most wickets: Shahbaz Nadeem (24) (Jharkhand)

The 2018–19 Vijay Hazare Trophy was the 26th edition of the Vijay Hazare Trophy, an annual List A cricket tournament in India. Karnataka were the defending champions.

It was contested by 37 domestic cricket teams of India, starting on 19 September 2018, ahead of the 2018–19 Ranji Trophy. In April 2018, the Board of Control for Cricket in India (BCCI) reinstated Bihar for the competition, bringing the total teams to 29. In July 2018, the BCCI increased the total number of teams to 37, with the addition of Arunachal Pradesh, Manipur, Meghalaya, Mizoram, Nagaland, Pondicherry, Sikkim and Uttarakhand.

The tournament has four groups, with nine teams in Groups A and B, and ten teams in Group C. All the new teams were placed in the Plate Group. The top two teams from Group C and the top team in the Plate Group progressed to the quarter-finals of the tournament, along with five best-ranked teams across Groups A and B.

In the Group C fixture between Rajasthan and Jharkhand, Jharkhand's Shahbaz Nadeem set a new List A cricket record, taking eight wickets for ten runs from ten overs. In the Plate Group fixture between Bihar and Sikkim, Sikkim were bowled out for 46 runs, with Bihar winning by 292 runs, the biggest margin of defeat by runs in Indian domestic cricket. In the Plate Group fixture between Uttarakhand and Sikkim, Uttarakhand's Karn Kaushal made the first double-century in the history of the Vijay Hazare Trophy, scoring 202 runs.

Mumbai and Maharashtra from Group A, Delhi, Andhra and Hyderabad from Group B and Bihar from the Plate Group all qualified for the quarter-finals of the competition. They were joined with Haryana and Jharkhand from Group C. The draw for the quarter-finals took place on 11 October 2018.

In the first quarter-final match, between Bihar and Mumbai, Bihar were bowled out for 69 runs, with Mumbai going on to win by nine wickets. In the second match, Delhi beat Haryana by five wickets, with Delhi's Gautam Gambhir scoring his 10,000th run in List A cricket. In the third fixture, Jharkhand beat Maharashtra by two wickets in a rain-affected match. In the fourth and final quarter-final match, Hyderabad beat Andhra by 14 runs to progress.

The first semi-final was also a rain-affected match, with Mumbai beating Hyderabad by 60 runs via the VJD method. In the second semi-final, Delhi beat Jharkhand by two wickets to join Mumbai in the final. Mumbai won the final, beating Delhi by four wickets. Afterwards Mumbai's captain, Shreyas Iyer, said that "we are a perfect team, and that is why we have won".

== Teams ==
The teams were drawn in the following groups:

Group A

- Baroda
- Goa
- Himachal Pradesh
- Karnataka
- Maharashtra
- Mumbai
- Punjab
- Railways
- Vidarbha

Group B

- Andhra
- Chhattisgarh
- Delhi
- Hyderabad
- Kerala
- Madhya Pradesh
- Odisha
- Saurashtra
- Uttar Pradesh

Group C

- Assam
- Bengal
- Gujarat
- Haryana
- Jammu & Kashmir
- Jharkhand
- Rajasthan
- Services
- Tamil Nadu
- Tripura

Plate Group

- Arunachal Pradesh
- Bihar
- Manipur
- Meghalaya
- Mizoram
- Nagaland
- Pondicherry
- Sikkim
- Uttarakhand

== League stage ==
=== Group A ===
Pos	Team	Pld	W	L	T	NR	Pts	NRR
1	Mumbai	8	6	0	0	2	28	1.634
3	Maharashtra	8	6	1	0	1	26	1.003
6	Baroda	8	4	2	0	2	20	1.141
7	Punjab	8	4	2	0	2	20	0.354
10	Himachal Pradesh	8	3	4	0	1	14	−0.138
11	Vidarbha	8	3	4	0	1	14	−0.819
12	Karnataka	8	2	4	0	2	12	−0.175
16	Goa	8	1	5	0	2	8	−0.935
18	Railways	8	0	7	0	1	2	−1.719

- Top five teams across Groups A and B advanced to the knockout stage.
- Bottom two teams across Groups A and B relegated to the Elite Group C for the next season.

=== Group C ===
Pos	Team	Pld	W	L	T	NR	Pts	NRR
1	Jharkhand	9	7	0	0	2	32	1.347
2	Haryana	9	6	1	0	2	28	1.661
3	Services	9	5	3	0	1	22	0.597
4	Gujarat	9	5	3	0	1	22	0.534
5	Tamil Nadu	9	5	4	0	0	20	0.767
6	Bengal	9	4	4	0	1	18	−0.115
7	Jammu & Kashmir	9	3	6	0	0	12	−0.855
8	Tripura	9	2	6	0	1	10	−0.580
9	Rajasthan	9	2	7	0	0	8	−0.971
10	Assam	9	1	6	0	2	8	−2.005

- Top two teams advances to the knockout stage and are promoted to the Elite Group A and B.
- Bottom ranked team is relegated to the Plate Group for the next season.

=== Group B ===
Pos	Team	Pld	W	L	T	NR	Pts	NRR
2	Delhi	8	6	1	0	1	26	1.258
4	Andhra	8	6	1	0	1	26	0.100
5	Hyderabad	8	5	2	0	1	22	0.539
8	Kerala	8	4	3	0	1	18	−0.165
9	Chhattisgarh	8	4	4	0	0	16	0.278
13	Saurashtra	8	3	5	0	0	12	−0.475
14	Odisha	8	2	5	0	1	10	−0.181
15	Uttar Pradesh	8	1	5	0	2	8	−0.378
17	Madhya Pradesh	8	1	6	0	1	6	−0.984

- Top five teams across Groups A and B advanced to the knockout stage.
- Bottom two teams across Groups A and B relegated to the Elite Group C for the next season.

=== Plate Group ===
Pos	Team	Pld	W	L	T	NR	Pts	NRR
1	Bihar	8	7	0	0	1	30	2.724
2	Uttarakhand	8	7	1	0	0	28	1.820
3	Pondicherry	8	5	1	0	2	24	1.727
4	Nagaland	8	5	3	0	0	20	0.909
5	Meghalaya	8	4	4	0	0	16	0.791
6	Manipur	8	2	5	0	1	10	−0.197
7	Arunachal Pradesh	8	2	5	0	1	10	−1.928
8	Mizoram	8	1	6	0	1	6	−2.467
9	Sikkim	8	0	8	0	0	0	−3.182

- Top team advanced to the knockout stage and gets promoted to Elite Group C for the next season.

== Knockout stage ==
Quarterfinals
A1	Mumbai	71/1 (12.3 overs)
P1	Bihar	69 (28.2 overs)
B3	Hyderabad	281/8 (50 overs)
B2	Andhra	267/9 (50 overs)
A2	Maharashtra	181 (42.2 overs)
C1	Jharkhand	127/2 (32.3 overs)
C2	Haryana	229 (49.1 overs)
B1	Delhi	230/5 (39.2 overs)

Semifinals
A1	Mumbai	155/2 (25 overs)
B3	Hyderabad	246/8 (50 overs)
C1	Jharkhand	199 (48.5 overs)
B1	Delhi	200/8 (49.4 overs)

Final
A1	Mumbai	180/6 (35 overs)
B1	Delhi	177 (45.4 overs)

=== Quarter-finals ===
Qualifier 1
14 October 2018
09:00
Scorecard

Bihar; 69 (28.2 overs)	v	Mumbai; 71/1 (12.3 overs)
MD Rahmatullah 18 (32); Tushar Deshpande 5/23 (9 overs)		Rohit Sharma 33* (42); Ashutosh Aman 1/6 (2.3 overs)

Mumbai won by 9 wickets
Just Cricket Academy Ground, Bengaluru
Umpires: Krishnaraj Srinath and Nikhil Patwardhan
Player of the match: Tushar Deshpande (Mumbai)

- Mumbai won the toss and elected to field.
- Vijay Bharti and Sabir Khan (Bihar) both made their List A debuts.

Qualifier 2
14 October 2018
09:00
Scorecard

Haryana; 229 (49.1 overs)	v	Delhi; 230/5 (39.2 overs)
Chaitanya Bishnoi 85 (117); Kulwant Khejroliya 6/31 (10 overs)		Gautam Gambhir 104 (72); Rahul Tewatia 3/32 (6 overs)

Delhi won by 5 wickets
M. Chinnaswamy Stadium, Bengaluru
Umpires: Ulhas Gandhe and Tapan Sharma
Player of the match: Kulwant Khejroliya (Delhi)

- Haryana won the toss and elected to bat.
- Gautam Gambhir (Delhi) scored his 10,000th run in List A cricket.

Qualifier 3
15 October 2018
09:00
Scorecard

Maharashtra; 181 (42.2 overs)	v	Jharkhand; 127/2 (32.4 overs)
Rohit Motwani 52 (73); Anukul Roy 4/32 (9 overs)		Shasheem Rathour 53* (81); Samad Fallah 1/13 (7 overs)

Jharkhand won by 8 wickets (VJD method)
M. Chinnaswamy Stadium, Bengaluru
Umpires: Nikhil Patwardhan and Nand Kishore
Player of the match: Anukul Roy (Jharkhand)

- Jharkhand won the toss and elected to field.
- Jharkhand were set a revised target of 127 runs from 34 overs due to rain.

Qualifier 4
15 October 2018
09:00
Scorecard

Hyderabad; 281/8 (50 overs)	v	Andhra; 267/9 (50 overs)
Bavanaka Sandeep 96 (97); Bandaru Ayyappa 2/38 (10 overs)		Hanuma Vihari 95 (99); Mohammed Siraj 3/50 (10 overs)

Hyderabad won by 14 runs
Just Cricket Academy Ground, Bengaluru
Umpires: Ulhas Gandhe and Tapan Sharma
Player of the match: Bavanaka Sandeep (Hyderabad)

- Andhra won the toss and elected to field.
- Prithvi Raj (Andhra) made his List A debut.

=== Semi-finals ===
Semi-final 1
17 October 2018
09:00
Scorecard

Hyderabad; 246/8 (50 overs)	v	Mumbai; 155/2 (25 overs)
Rohit Rayudu 121* (132); Tushar Deshpande 3/55 (10 overs)		Prithvi Shaw 61 (44); Mehdi Hassan 2/23 (6 overs)

Mumbai won by 60 runs (VJD method)
M. Chinnaswamy Stadium, Bengaluru
Umpires: Ulhas Gandhe and Krishnaraj Srinath
Player of the match: Tushar Deshpande (Mumbai)

- Hyderabad won the toss and elected to bat.
- Mumbai were set a revised target of 96 runs from 25 overs due to rain.

Semi-final 2
18 October 2018
09:00
Scorecard

Jharkhand; 199 (48.5 overs)	v	Delhi; 200/8 (49.4 overs)
Virat Singh 71 (91); Navdeep Saini 4/30 (10 overs)		Pawan Negi 39* (49); Anand Singh 3/39 (7 overs)

Delhi won by 2 wickets
M. Chinnaswamy Stadium, Bengaluru
Umpires: Nikhil Patwardhan and Nand Kishore
Player of the match: Navdeep Saini (Delhi)

- Delhi won the toss and elected to field.

=== Final ===
Final
20 October 2018
09:00
Scorecard

Delhi; 177 (45.4 overs)	v	Mumbai; 180/6 (35 overs)
Himmat Singh 41 (65); Shivam Dube 3/29 (10 overs)		Aditya Tare 71 (89); Navdeep Saini 3/53 (10 overs)

Mumbai won by 4 wickets
M. Chinnaswamy Stadium, Bengaluru
Umpires: Krishnaraj Srinath and Nand Kishore
Player of the match: Aditya Tare (Mumbai)

- Mumbai won the toss and elected to field.
