= 2023 Royal Challengers Bangalore season =

Indian Premier League cricket team season

Royal Challengers Bangalore
2023 season
- Coach: Sanjay Bangar
- Captain: Faf du Plessis; Virat Kohli (Stand-In)
- Ground(s): M. Chinnaswamy Stadium, Bengaluru
- League stage: 6th
- Most runs: Faf du Plessis (730)
- Most wickets: Mohammed Siraj (19)

The 2023 season was the 16th season for the IPL cricket franchise Royal Challengers Bangalore based in Bangalore, Karnataka, India. They were one of the ten teams to compete in the 2023 Indian Premier League. The team was captained by Faf du Plessis, and coached by Sanjay Bangar. Virat Kohli captained the team in three games when Faf Du Plessis was ruled out due to injury.

== Background ==
The side retained three players ahead of the 2022 mega-auction.

Retained
Virat Kohli, Glenn Maxwell, Mohammad Siraj, Faf du Plessis, Harshal Patel, Wanindu Hasaranga, Dinesh Karthik, Shahbaz Ahmad, Anuj Rawat, Akash Deep, Josh Hazlewood, Mahipal Lomror, Finn Allen, Suyash Prabhudessai, Karn Sharma, Siddarth Kaul, David Willey
Released
Jason Behrendorff, Aneeshwar Gautam, Sherfane Rutherford, Luvnith Sisodia, Chama Milind
Acquired during the auction
Will Jacks, Reece Topley, Rajan Kumar, Avinash Singh, Sonu Yadav, Himanshu Sharma, Manoj Bhandage

== Squad ==
- Players with international caps are listed in **bold**
- Squad strength: 25 (18 - Indian, 7 - overseas)

No.	Name	Nationality	Birth date	Batting style	Bowling style	Year signed	Notes
Captain
13	**Faf du Plessis**	South Africa	13 July 1984 (aged 38)	Right-handed	Right-arm leg-break	2022	Overseas
Batters
18	**Virat Kohli**	India	5 November 1988 (aged 34)	Right-handed	Right-arm medium	2008	
	**Finn Allen**	New Zealand	22 April 1999 (aged 23)	Right-handed	Right-arm off-break	2021	Overseas
97	Rajat Patidar	India	1 June 1993 (aged 29)	Right-handed	Right-arm off break	2021	
43	Suyash Prabhudessai	India	6 December 1997 (aged 25)	Right-handed	Right-arm medium	2021	
	**Will Jacks**	England	21 November 1998 (aged 24)	Right-handed	Right-arm off-break	2023	Overseas
8	**Kedar Jadhav**	India	26 March 1985 (aged 38)	Right-handed	Right-arm off-break	2023	Injury replacement for David Willey
All-rounders
32	**Glenn Maxwell**	Australia	14 October 1988 (aged 34)	Right-handed	Right-arm off-break	2021	Overseas
49	**Wanindu Hasaranga**	Sri Lanka	29 July 1997 (aged 25)	Right-handed	Right-arm leg-break	2021	Overseas
21	**Shahbaz Ahmed**	India	12 December 1994 (aged 28)	Left-handed	Slow left-arm orthodox	2020	
15	**David Willey**	England	28 February 1990 (aged 33)	Left-handed	Left-arm fast medium	2022	Overseas
16	Mahipal Lomror	India	16 November 1999 (aged 23)	Left-handed	Slow left-arm orthodox	2022	
33	**Karn Sharma**	India	23 October 1987 (aged 35)	Right-handed	Right-arm leg-break	2022	
4	**Michael Bracewell**	New Zealand	14 February 1991 (aged 32)	Left-handed	Right-arm leg-break	2023	Overseas, Injury Replacement for Will Jacks
	Sonu Yadav	India	11 November 1999 (aged 23)	Right-handed	Right-handed medium-fast	2023	
	Manoj Bhandage	India	5 October 1998 (aged 24)	Left-handed	Right-handed medium	2023	
Pace Bowlers
73	**Mohammed Siraj**	India	13 March 1994 (aged 29)	Right-handed	Right-arm fast-medium	2018	
38	**Josh Hazlewood**	Australia	8 January 1991 (aged 32)	Left-handed	Right-arm fast-medium	2022	Overseas
1	**Siddarth Kaul**	India	19 May 1990 (aged 32)	Right-handed	Right-arm fast-medium	2022	
9	**Harshal Patel**	India	23 November 1990 (aged 32)	Right-handed	Right-arm fast medium	2021	
11	Akash Deep	India	15 December 1996 (aged 26)	Right-handed	Right-arm medium	2022	
8	**Reece Topley**	England	21 February 1994 (aged 29)	Right-handed	Left-arm fast-medium	2023	Overseas
	Rajan Kumar	India	8 July 1996 (aged 26)	Left-handed	Left-arm medium-fast	2023	
31	Vijaykumar Vyshak	India	31 January 1997 (aged 26)	Right-handed	Right-arm medium	2023	Injury replacement for Rajat Patidar
7	**Wayne Parnell**	South Africa	30 July 1989 (aged 33)	Left-handed	Left-arm medium-fast	2023	Injury replacement for Reece Topley
45	Avinash Singh	India	4 January 1998 (aged 25)	Right-handed	Right-arm fast	2023	
Spin Bowlers
44	Himanshu Sharma	India	6 June 1998 (aged 24)	Right-handed	Right-arm leg break	2023	

== Teams and standings ==
=== Points table ===
Pos	Grp	Team	Pld	W	L	NR	Pts	NRR	Qualification
1	B	Gujarat Titans (R)	14	10	4	0	20	0.809	Advanced to Qualifier 1
2	B	Chennai Super Kings (C)	14	8	5	1	17	0.652	Advanced to Qualifier 1
3	A	Lucknow Super Giants (4th)	14	8	5	1	17	0.284	Advanced to Eliminator
4	A	Mumbai Indians (3rd)	14	8	6	0	16	−0.044	Advanced to Eliminator
5	A	Rajasthan Royals	14	7	7	0	14	0.148	
6	B	Royal Challengers Bangalore	14	7	7	0	14	0.135	
7	A	Kolkata Knight Riders	14	6	8	0	12	−0.239	
8	B	Punjab Kings	14	6	8	0	12	−0.304	
9	A	Delhi Capitals	14	5	9	0	10	−0.808	
10	B	Sunrisers Hyderabad	14	4	10	0	8	−0.590	

Source: Indian Premier League

The four top-ranked teams will qualify for the Playoffs.
Advance to Qualifier 1
Advance to Eliminator

== Matches ==
Match 5
2 April 2023
19:30 (N)
Scorecard

Mumbai Indians; 171/7 (20 overs)	v	Royal Challengers Bangalore (H); 172/2 (16.2 overs)
Tilak Varma 84* (46); Karn Sharma 2/32 (4 overs)		Virat Kohli 82* (49); Arshad Khan 1/28 (2.2 overs)

Royal Challengers Bangalore won by 8 wickets
M. Chinnaswamy Stadium, Bengaluru
Umpires: Nitin Menon (Ind) and Tapan Sharma (Ind)
Player of the match: Faf du Plessis (Royal Challengers Bangalore)

- Royal Challengers Bangalore won the toss and elected to field.
- Arshad Khan and Nehal Wadhera (Mumbai Indians) both made their T20 debuts.

Match 9
6 April 2023
19:30 (N)
Scorecard

Kolkata Knight Riders (H); 204/7 (20 overs)	v	Royal Challengers Bangalore; 123 (17.4 overs)
Shardul Thakur 68 (29); David Willey 2/16 (4 overs)		Faf du Plessis 23 (12); Varun Chakaravarthy 4/15 (3.4 overs)

Kolkata Knight Riders won by 81 runs
Eden Gardens, Kolkata
Umpires: Virender Sharma (Ind) and Vinod Seshan (Ind)
Player of the match: Shardul Thakur (Kolkata Knight Riders)

- Royal Challengers Bangalore won the toss and elected to field.
- Suyash Sharma (Kolkata Knight Riders) made his T20 debut.

Match 15
10 April 2023
19:30 (N)
Scorecard

(H) Royal Challengers Bangalore; 212/2 (20 overs)	v	Lucknow Super Giants; 213/9 (20 overs)
Faf du Plessis 79* (46); Amit Mishra 1/18 (2 overs)		Marcus Stoinis 65 (30); Mohammed Siraj 3/22 (4 overs)

Lucknow Super Giants won by 1 wicket
M. Chinnaswamy Stadium, Bengaluru
Umpires: Anil Chaudhary (Ind) and Nand Kishore (Ind)
Player of the match: Nicholas Pooran (Lucknow Super Giants)

- Lucknow Super Giants won the toss and elected to field.

Match 20
15 April 2023
15:30 (D/N)
Scorecard

(H) Royal Challengers Bangalore; 174/6 (20 overs)	v	Delhi Capitals; 151/9 (20 overs)
Virat Kohli 50 (34); Mitchell Marsh 2/18 (2 overs)		Manish Pandey 50 (38); Vijaykumar Vyshak 3/20 (4 overs)

Royal Challengers Bangalore won by 23 runs
M. Chinnaswamy Stadium, Bengaluru
Umpires: K. N. Ananthapadmanabhan (Ind) and Saidharshan Kumar (Ind)
Player of the match: Virat Kohli (Royal Challengers Bangalore)

- Delhi Capitals won the toss and elected to field.

Match 24
17 April 2023
19:30 (N)
Scorecard

Chennai Super Kings; 226/6 (20 overs)	v	Royal Challengers Bangalore (H); 218/8 (20 overs)
Devon Conway 83 (45); Wanindu Hasaranga 1/21 (2 overs)		Glenn Maxwell 76 (36); Tushar Deshpande 3/45 (4 overs)

Chennai Super Kings won by 8 runs
M. Chinnaswamy Stadium, Bengaluru
Umpires: K. N. Ananthapadmanabhan (Ind) and Navdeep Singh (Ind)
Player of the match: Devon Conway (Chennai Super Kings)

- Royal Challengers Bangalore won the toss and elected to field.

Match 27
20 April 2023
15:30 (D/N)
Scorecard

Royal Challengers Bangalore; 174/4 (20 overs)	v	Punjab Kings (H); 150 (18.2 overs)
Faf du Plessis 84 (56); Harpreet Brar 2/31 (3 overs)		Prabhsimran Singh 46 (30); Mohammed Siraj 4/21 (4 overs)

Royal Challengers Bangalore won by 24 runs
Inderjit Singh Bindra Stadium, Mohali
Umpires: Anil Chaudhary (Ind) and Sadashiv Iyer (Ind)
Player of the match: Mohammed Siraj (Royal Challengers Bangalore)

- Punjab Kings won the toss and elected to field.

Match 32
23 April 2023
15:30 (D/N)
Scorecard

(H) Royal Challengers Bangalore; 189/9 (20 overs)	v	Rajasthan Royals; 182/6 (20 overs)
Glenn Maxwell 77 (44); Trent Boult 2/41 (4 overs)		Devdutt Padikkal 52 (34); Harshal Patel 3/32 (4 overs)

Royal Challengers Bangalore won by 7 runs
M. Chinnaswamy Stadium, Bangalore
Umpires: Michael Gough (Eng) and Saidharshan Kumar (Ind)
Player of the match: Glenn Maxwell (Royal Challengers Bangalore)

- Rajasthan Royals won the toss and elected to field.

Match 36
26 April 2023
19:30 (N)
Scorecard

Kolkata Knight Riders; 200/5 (20 overs)	v	Royal Challengers Bangalore (H); 179/8 (20 overs)
Jason Roy 56 (29); Wanindu Hasaranga 2/24 (4 overs)		Virat Kohli 54 (37); Varun Chakravarthy 3/27 (4 overs)

Kolkata Knight Riders won by 21 runs
M. Chinnaswamy Stadium, Bengaluru
Umpires: K. N. Ananthapadmanabhan (Ind) and Rohan Pandit (Ind)
Player of the match: Varun Chakravarthy (Kolkata Knight Riders)

- Royal Challengers Bangalore won the toss and elected to field.

Match 43
1 May 2023
19:30 (N)
Scorecard

Royal Challengers Bangalore; 126/9 (20 overs)	v	Lucknow Super Giants (H); 108 (19.5 overs)
Faf du Plessis 44 (40); Naveen-ul-Haq 3/30 (4 overs)		Krishnappa Gowtham 23 (13); Josh Hazlewood 2/15 (3 overs)

Royal Challengers Bangalore won by 18 runs
BRSABV Ekana Cricket Stadium, Lucknow
Umpires: Anil Chaudhary (Ind) and Sadashiv Iyer (Ind)
Player of the match: Faf du Plessis (Royal Challengers Bangalore)

- Royal Challengers Bangalore won the toss and elected to bat.

Match 50
6 May 2023
19:30 (N)
Scorecard

Royal Challengers Bangalore; 181/4 (20 overs)	v	Delhi Capitals (H); 187/3 (16.4 overs)
Virat Kohli 55 (46); Mitchell Marsh 2/21 (3 overs)		Phil Salt 87 (45); Josh Hazlewood 1/29 (3 overs)

Delhi Capitals won by 7 wickets
Arun Jaitley Stadium, Delhi
Umpires: Yeshwant Barde (Ind) and Rod Tucker (Aus)
Player of the match: Phil Salt (Delhi Capitals)

- Royal Challengers Bangalore won the toss and elected to bat.

Match 54
9 May 2023
19:30 (N)
Scorecard

Royal Challengers Bangalore; 199/6 (20 overs)	v	Mumbai Indians (H); 200/4 (16.3 overs)
Glenn Maxwell 68 (33); Jason Behrendorff 3/36 (4 overs)		Suryakumar Yadav 83 (35); Vijaykumar Vyshak 2/37 (3 overs)

Mumbai Indians won by 6 wickets
Wankhede Stadium, Mumbai
Umpires: Saiyed Khalid (Ind) and Virender Sharma (Ind)
Player of the match: Suryakumar Yadav (Mumbai Indians)

- Mumbai Indians won the toss and elected to field.

Match 60
14 May 2023
15:30 (D/N)
Scorecard

Royal Challengers Bangalore; 171/5 (20 overs)	v	Rajasthan Royals (H); 59 (10.3 overs)
Faf du Plessis 55 (44); Adam Zampa 2/25 (4 overs)		Shimron Hetmyer 35 (19); Wayne Parnell 3/10 (3 overs)

Royal Challengers Bangalore won by 112 runs
Sawai Mansingh Stadium, Jaipur
Umpires: K. N. Ananthapadmanabhan (Ind) and Navdeep Singh (Ind)
Player of the match: Wayne Parnell (Royal Challengers Bangalore)

- Royal Challengers Bangalore won the toss and elected to bat.

Match 65
18 May 2023
19:30 (N)
Scorecard

(H) Sunrisers Hyderabad; 186/5 (20 overs)	v	Royal Challengers Bangalore; 187/2 (19.2 overs)
Heinrich Klaasen 104 (51); Michael Bracewell 2/13 (2 overs)		Virat Kohli 100 (63); T. Natarajan 1/34 (4 overs)

Royal Challengers Bangalore won by 8 wickets
Rajiv Gandhi International Stadium, Hyderabad
Umpires: Bruce Oxenford (Aus) and Virender Sharma (Ind)
Player of the match: Virat Kohli (Royal Challengers Bangalore)

- Royal Challengers Bangalore won the toss and elected to field.
- Heinrich Klaasen (Sunrisers Hyderabad) scored his maiden IPL century.

Match 70
21 May 2023
19:30 (N)
Scorecard

(H) Royal Challengers Bangalore; 197/5 (20 overs)	v	Gujarat Titans; 198/4 (19.1 overs)
Virat Kohli 101* (61); Noor Ahmad 2/39 (4 overs)		Shubman Gill 104* (52); Mohammed Siraj 2/32 (4 overs)

Gujarat Titans won by 6 wickets
M. Chinnaswamy Stadium, Bengaluru
Umpires: Nitin Menon (Ind) and Virender Sharma (Ind)
Player of the match: Shubman Gill (Gujarat Titans)

- Gujarat Titans won the toss and elected to field.
- Himanshu Sharma (Royal Challengers Bangalore) made his T20 debut.
- Mumbai Indians qualified for the playoffs and Royal Challengers Bangalore were eliminated as a result of this match.

== Statistics ==
Most runs
Runs	Player
730	Faf du Plessis
639	Virat Kohli
400	Glenn Maxwell
140	Dinesh Karthik
135	Mahipal Lomror

Most wickets
Wickets	Player
19	Mohammed Siraj
14	Harshal Patel
10	Karn Sharma
9	Wanindu Hasaranga
9	Wayne Parnell
