= 2025 Royal Challengers Bengaluru season =

Indian Premier League cricket team

Royal Challengers Bengaluru
2025 season
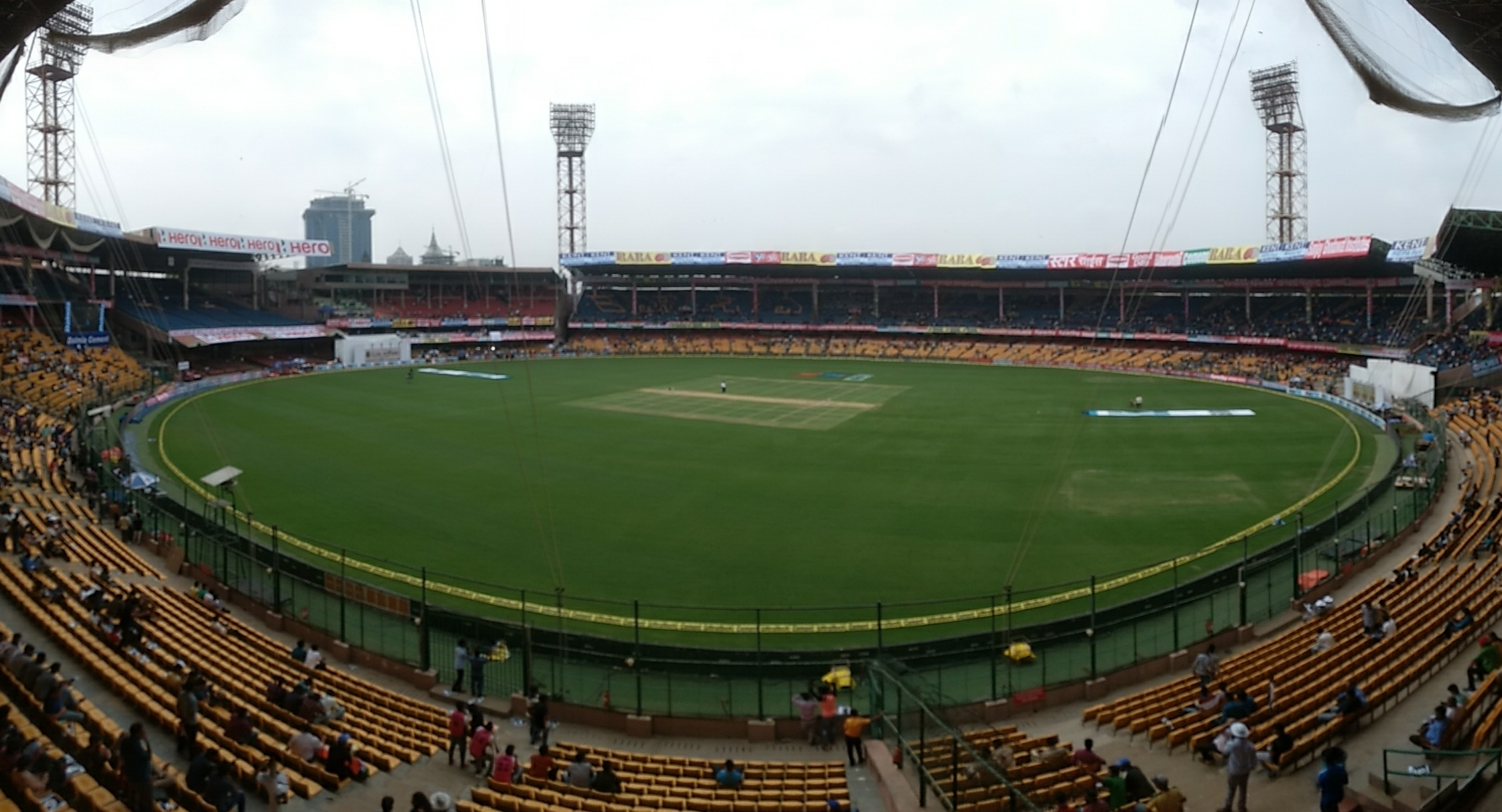
- M. Chinnaswamy Stadium, home ground of Royal Challengers Bengaluru
- Coach: Andy Flower
- Captain: Rajat Patidar
- Ground(s): M. Chinnaswamy Stadium, Bengaluru
- League stage: 2nd place
- Qualifier 1: Won against Punjab Kings
- Final: Won against Punjab Kings
- Most runs: Virat Kohli (657)
- Most wickets: Josh Hazlewood (22)
- Most catches: Phil Salt (9)
- Most wicket-keeping dismissals: Jitesh Sharma (20)

The 2025 season was the 18th season for the Indian Premier League (IPL) cricket franchise Royal Challengers Bengaluru. They were one of the ten teams that competed in the 2025 IPL. Ahead of the season, Rajat Patidar was announced as the captain. The team was coached by Andy Flower.

Royal Challengers Bengaluru finished in second place in the league stage, and advanced to Qualifier 1 in the playoffs. They also became the first IPL team to win all away games in a season. The team defeated Punjab Kings in Qualifier 1 to qualify for Bengaluru's fourth final. In the final, they defeated Punjab Kings again to win their maiden title after 18 years. Virat Kohli scored the most runs (657) while Josh Hazlewood took the most wickets (22) for Bengaluru in the 2025 season.

== Pre-season ==
The 2025 Indian Premier League was the 18th edition of the Indian Premier League (IPL), a professional Twenty20 (T20) cricket league, organised by the Board of Control for Cricket in India (BCCI). Royal Challengers Bengaluru were one of the four active franchises to not have won the IPL title prior to 2025. The team finished in fourth place in the previous season. The tournament featured ten teams competing in 74 matches from 22 March to 3 June 2025. Bengaluru played all their home matches at M. Chinnaswamy Stadium, except for the last one, which was moved to Ekana Cricket Stadium due to the weather conditions in Bengaluru.

=== Player retention ===
Franchises were allowed to retain a maximum of six players from their squad, including a maximum of five recent international players. Franchises were required to submit their retention lists before 31 October 2024. Bengaluru retained three players, including captain Rajat Patidar and former captain Virat Kohli.

Retained players
No.	Player	Salary
1	Virat Kohli	₹21 crore (US$2.2 million)
2	Rajat Patidar	₹11 crore (US$1.1 million)
3	Yash Dayal	₹5 crore (US$520,000)

Released players
Batters	Wicket-keepers	All-rounders	Fast bowlers	Spin bowlers
Suyash Prabhudessai; Saurav Chauhan	Dinesh Karthik (Note: Dinesh Karthik announced his retirement from IPL in June 2024.); Anuj Rawat	Glenn Maxwell; Mahipal Lomror; Cameron Green; Will Jacks; Swapnil Singh; Manoj Bhandage; Mayank Dagar	Reece Topley; Akash Deep; Mohammed Siraj; Alzarri Joseph; Lockie Ferguson; Vijaykumar Vyshak; Rajan Kumar	Karn Sharma; Himanshu Sharma

=== Auction ===
The season's auction took place on 24 and 25 November 2024 in Jeddah, Saudi Arabia. The auction purse for each franchise was set at ₹120 crore (US$12 million), with the franchises being deducted an amount from the purse for each retained player. Bengaluru had a purse remaining of ₹83 crore (US$8.6 million). Franchises that did not retain six players, were allowed Right-to-Match (RTM) cards at the auction for each player not retained. Bengaluru had three cards available. Bengaluru bought nineteen players in the auction, including twelve capped players and eight overseas players. Bengaluru used their RTM card to buy back Swapnil Singh for ₹50 lakh (US$52,000).

== Squad ==
- Players with international caps as of start of 2025 IPL are listed in **bold**.
- Ages are as of 22 March 2025.
- Withdrawn players are indicated by a dagger symbol (†) and placed at the bottom of the table.

Royal Challengers Bengaluru squad for the 2025 Indian Premier League
S/N	Name	Nationality	Birth date	Batting style	Bowling style	Salary	Notes
5	Suyash Sharma	India	15 May 2003 (aged 21)	Right-handed	Right-arm leg-break	₹2.6 crore (US$270,000)	
6	**Krunal Pandya**	India	24 March 1991 (aged 33)	Left-handed	Left-arm orthodox	₹5.75 crore (US$600,000)	
8	**Tim David**	Australia	16 March 1996 (aged 29)	Right-handed	Right-arm off-break	₹3 crore (US$310,000)	Overseas
13	**Yash Dayal**	India	13 December 1997 (aged 27)	Right-handed	Left-arm medium-fast	₹5 crore (US$520,000)	
14	Abhinandan Singh	India	30 March 1997 (aged 27)	Right-handed	Right-arm fast-medium	₹30 lakh (US$31,000)	
15	**Bhuvneshwar Kumar**	India	5 February 1990 (aged 35)	Right-handed	Right-arm medium	₹10.75 crore (US$1.1 million)	
16	Mayank Agarwal	India	16 February 1991 (aged 34)	Right-handed	Right-arm off-break	₹1 crore (US$100,000)	Replacement (Note: Mayank Agarwal replaced Devdutt Padikkal, after the latter withdrew due to right hamstring injury.)
18	**Virat Kohli**	India	5 November 1988 (aged 36)	Right-handed	Right-arm medium	₹21 crore (US$2.2 million)	
21	Manoj Bhandage	India	5 October 1998 (aged 26)	Left-handed	Right-arm medium-fast	₹30 lakh (US$31,000)	
23	**Liam Livingstone**	England	4 August 1993 (aged 31)	Right-handed	Right-arm off-break	₹8.75 crore (US$910,000)	Overseas
24	Swapnil Singh	India	22 January 1991 (aged 34)	Right-handed	Left-arm orthodox	₹50 lakh (US$52,000)	
28	**Phil Salt**	England	28 August 1996 (aged 28)	Right-handed	—N/a	₹11.5 crore (US$1.2 million)	Overseas
29	**Tim Seifert**	New Zealand	14 December 1994 (aged 30)	Right-handed	—N/a	₹2 crore (US$210,000)	Overseas; temporary (Note: Royal Challengers Bengaluru signed Tim Seifert and Blessing Muzarabani as temporary replacements, following the IPL's suspension and rescheduling.) replacement (Note: Tim Seifert replaced Jacob Bethell, after the latter withdrew due to national duty.)
32	**Blessing Muzarabani**	Zimbabwe	2 October 1996 (aged 28)	Right-handed	Right-arm fast-medium	₹75 lakh (US$78,000)	Overseas; temporary replacement (Note: Blessing Muzarabani replaced Lungi Ngidi, after the latter withdrew due to national duty.)
38	**Josh Hazlewood**	Australia	8 January 1991 (aged 34)	Right-handed	Right-arm fast-medium	₹12.5 crore (US$1.3 million)	Overseas
42	Rasikh Salam	India	5 April 2000 (aged 24)	Right-handed	Right-arm medium	₹6 crore (US$620,000)	
48	**Romario Shepherd**	West Indies	26 November 1994 (aged 30)	Right-handed	Right-arm fast-medium	₹1.5 crore (US$160,000)	Overseas
53	**Nuwan Thushara**	Sri Lanka	6 August 1994 (aged 30)	Right-handed	Right-arm fast-medium	₹1.6 crore (US$170,000)	Overseas
55	**Jitesh Sharma**	India	22 October 1993 (aged 31)	Right-handed	—N/a	₹11 crore (US$1.1 million)	Stand-in captain (Note: Jitesh Sharma captained Royal Challengers Bengaluru against Sunrisers Hyderabad when Rajat Patidar was unavailable.)
97	**Rajat Patidar**	India	1 June 1993 (aged 31)	Right-handed	Right-arm off-break	₹11 crore (US$1.1 million)	Captain
99	Swastik Chikara	India	3 April 2005 (aged 19)	Right-handed	Right-arm off-break	₹30 lakh (US$31,000)	
2	**Jacob Bethell** †	England	23 October 2003 (aged 21)	Left-handed	Left-arm orthodox	₹2.6 crore (US$270,000)	Overseas; withdrawn
22	**Lungi Ngidi** †	South Africa	29 March 1996 (aged 28)	Right-handed	Right-arm fast-medium	₹1 crore (US$100,000)	Overseas; withdrawn
37	**Devdutt Padikkal** †	India	7 July 2000 (aged 24)	Left-handed	Right-arm off-break	₹2 crore (US$210,000)	Withdrawn

== Support staff ==
Former player Dinesh Karthik joined the squad as batting coach and mentor following his retirement in the previous season replacing Neil McKenzie while Omkar Salvi replaced Adam Griffith as bowling coach.

Position	Name
Head coach	Andy Flower
Assistant coach	Richard Halsall
Batting coach and mentor	Dinesh Karthik
Bowling coach	Omkar Salvi; Malolan Rangarajan

- Source: Wisden

== League stage ==
Royal Challengers Bengaluru began their season with two wins against Kolkata Knight Riders and Chennai Super Kings. They lost to Gujarat Titans, won against Mumbai Indians, lost to Delhi Capitals, won against Rajasthan Royals and lost to Punjab Kings. Bengaluru won their next four matches against Punjab, Rajasthan, Delhi and Chennai. Their twelfth match against Kolkata was abandoned due to rain. They lost to Sunrisers Hyderabad and won against Lucknow Super Giants; to finish the league stage in second place with nine wins from 14 matches, and advanced to Qualifier 1 in the playoffs. They also became the first IPL team to win all away games in a season.

=== Points table ===
League stage standings
Pos	Grp	Team	Pld	W	L	NR	Pts	NRR	Qualification
1	A	Punjab Kings	14	9	4	1	19	0.372	Advance to Qualifier 1
2	A	Royal Challengers Bengaluru	14	9	4	1	19	0.301	Advance to Qualifier 1
3	B	Gujarat Titans	14	9	5	0	18	0.254	Advance to Eliminator
4	B	Mumbai Indians	14	8	6	0	16	1.142	Advance to Eliminator
5	B	Delhi Capitals	14	7	6	1	15	−0.011	Eliminated
6	B	Sunrisers Hyderabad	14	6	7	1	13	−0.241	Eliminated
7	B	Lucknow Super Giants	14	6	8	0	12	−0.376	Eliminated
8	A	Kolkata Knight Riders	14	5	7	2	12	−0.305	Eliminated
9	A	Rajasthan Royals	14	4	10	0	8	−0.549	Eliminated
10	A	Chennai Super Kings	14	4	10	0	8	−0.647	Eliminated

Source: ESPNcricinfo

=== League progression ===
League progression
Team	Group matches														Playoffs		
Team	1	2	3	4	5	6	7	8	9	10	11	12	13	14	Q1/E	Q2	F
Royal Challengers Bengaluru	2	4	4	6	6	8	8	10	12	14	16	17	17	19	W		W

Win	Loss	No result

- Note: The total points at the end of each group match are listed.
- Note: Click on the points (group matches) or W/L (playoffs) to see the match summary.

=== Fixtures ===
Match 1
22 March 2025
19:30 (N)
Scorecard

Kolkata Knight Riders (H); 174/8 (20 overs)	v	Royal Challengers Bengaluru; 177/3 (16.2 overs)
Ajinkya Rahane 56 (31); Krunal Pandya 3/29 (4 overs)		Virat Kohli 59* (36); Sunil Narine 1/27 (4 overs)

Royal Challengers Bengaluru won by 7 wickets
Eden Gardens, Kolkata
Umpires: Abhijeet Bengeri (Ind) and Vinod Seshan (Ind)
Player of the match: Krunal Pandya (Royal Challengers Bengaluru)

- Royal Challengers Bengaluru won the toss and elected to field.

Match 8
28 March 2025
19:30 (N)
Scorecard

Royal Challengers Bengaluru; 196/7 (20 overs)	v	Chennai Super Kings (H); 146/8 (20 overs)
Rajat Patidar 51 (32); Noor Ahmad 3/36 (4 overs)		Rachin Ravindra 41 (31); Josh Hazlewood 3/21 (4 overs)

Royal Challengers Bengaluru won by 50 runs
M. A. Chidambaram Stadium, Chennai
Umpires: Saiyed Khalid (Ind) and Nitin Menon (Ind)
Player of the match: Rajat Patidar (Royal Challengers Bengaluru)

- Chennai Super Kings won the toss and elected to field.

Match 14
2 April 2025
19:30 (N)
Scorecard

Royal Challengers Bengaluru (H); 169/8 (20 overs)	v	Gujarat Titans; 170/2 (17.5 overs)
Liam Livingstone 54 (40); Mohammed Siraj 3/19 (4 overs)		Jos Buttler 73* (39); Bhuvneshwar Kumar 1/23 (4 overs)

Gujarat Titans won by 8 wickets
M. Chinnaswamy Stadium, Bengaluru
Umpires: Abhijit Bhattacharya (Ind) and Ulhas Gandhe (Ind)
Player of the match: Mohammed Siraj (Gujarat Titans)

- Gujarat Titans won the toss and elected to field.

Match 20
7 April 2025
19:30 (N)
Scorecard

Royal Challengers Bengaluru; 221/5 (20 overs)	v	Mumbai Indians (H); 209/9 (20 overs)
Virat Kohli 67 (42); Hardik Pandya 2/45 (4 overs)		Tilak Varma 56 (29); Krunal Pandya 4/45 (4 overs)

Royal Challengers Bengaluru won by 12 runs
Wankhede Stadium, Mumbai
Umpires: Parashar Joshi (Ind) and Vinod Seshan (Ind)
Player of the match: Rajat Patidar (Royal Challengers Bengaluru)

- Mumbai Indians won the toss and elected to field.

Match 24
10 April 2025
19:30 (N)
Scorecard

Royal Challengers Bengaluru (H); 163/7 (20 overs)	v	Delhi Capitals; 169/4 (17.5 overs)
Phil Salt 37 (17); Kuldeep Yadav 2/17 (4 overs)		KL Rahul 93* (53); Bhuvneshwar Kumar 2/26 (4 overs)

Delhi Capitals won by 6 wickets
M. Chinnaswamy Stadium, Bengaluru
Umpires: K. N. Ananthapadmanabhan (Ind) and Saidharshan Kumar (Ind)
Player of the match: KL Rahul (Delhi Capitals)

- Delhi Capitals won the toss and elected to field.

Match 28
13 April 2025
15:30 (D/N)
Scorecard

Rajasthan Royals (H); 173/4 (20 overs)	v	Royal Challengers Bengaluru; 175/1 (17.3 overs)
Yashasvi Jaiswal 75 (47); Josh Hazlewood 1/26 (3 overs)		Phil Salt 65 (33); Kumar Kartikeya 1/25 (3 overs)

Royal Challengers Bengaluru won by 9 wickets
Sawai Mansingh Stadium, Jaipur
Umpires: Saidharshan Kumar (Ind) and Nitin Menon (Ind)
Player of the match: Phil Salt (Royal Challengers Bengaluru)

- Royal Challengers Bengaluru won the toss and elected to field.

Match 34
18 April 2025
19:30 (N)
Scorecard

Royal Challengers Bengaluru (H); 95/9 (14 overs)	v	Punjab Kings; 98/5 (12.1 overs)
Tim David 50* (26); Marco Jansen 2/10 (3 overs)		Nehal Wadhera 33* (19); Josh Hazlewood 3/14 (3 overs)

Punjab Kings won by 5 wickets
M. Chinnaswamy Stadium, Bengaluru
Umpires: Ulhas Gandhe (Ind) and Virender Sharma (Ind)
Player of the match: Tim David (Royal Challengers Bengaluru)

- Punjab Kings won the toss and elected to field.
- The match was reduced to 14 overs per side due to rain.
- Manoj Bhandage (Royal Challengers Bengaluru) made his IPL debut.

Match 37
20 April 2025
15:30 (N)
Scorecard

Punjab Kings (H); 157/6 (20 overs)	v	Royal Challengers Bengaluru; 159/3 (18.5 overs)
Prabhsimran Singh 33 (17); Krunal Pandya 2/25 (4 overs)		Virat Kohli 73* (54); Arshdeep Singh 1/26 (3 overs)

Royal Challengers Bengaluru won by 7 wickets
Maharaja Yadavindra Singh International Cricket Stadium, Mullanpur
Umpires: Kaushik Gandhi (Ind) and Saidharshan Kumar (Ind)
Player of the match: Virat Kohli (Royal Challengers Bengaluru)

- Royal Challengers Bengaluru won the toss and elected to field.

Match 42
24 April 2025
19:30 (N)
Scorecard

Royal Challengers Bengaluru (H); 205/5 (20 overs)	v	Rajasthan Royals; 194/9 (20 overs)
Virat Kohli 70 (42); Sandeep Sharma 2/45 (4 overs)		Yashasvi Jaiswal 49 (19); Josh Hazlewood 4/33 (4 overs)

Royal Challengers Bengaluru won by 11 runs
M. Chinnaswamy Stadium, Bengaluru
Umpires: Ulhas Gandhe (Ind) and Michael Gough (Eng)
Player of the match: Josh Hazlewood (Royal Challengers Bengaluru)

- Rajasthan Royals won the toss and elected to field.

Match 46
27 April 2025
19:30 (N)
Scorecard

Delhi Capitals (H); 162/8 (20 overs)	v	Royal Challengers Bengaluru; 165/4 (18.3 overs)
KL Rahul 41 (39); Bhuvneshwar Kumar 3/33 (4 overs)		Krunal Pandya 73* (47); Axar Patel 2/19 (4 overs)

Royal Challengers Bengaluru won by 6 wickets
Arun Jaitley Stadium, Delhi
Umpires: Mohit Krishnadas (Ind) and Nitin Menon (Ind)
Player of the match: Krunal Pandya (Royal Challengers Bengaluru)

- Royal Challengers Bengaluru won the toss and elected to field.
- Jacob Bethell (Royal Challengers Bengaluru) made his IPL debut.

Match 52
3 May 2025
19:30 (N)
Scorecard

Royal Challengers Bengaluru (H); 213/5 (20 overs)	v	Chennai Super Kings; 211/5 (20 overs)
Virat Kohli 62 (33); Matheesha Pathirana 3/36 (4 overs)		Ayush Mhatre 94 (48); Lungi Ngidi 3/30 (4 overs)

Royal Challengers Bengaluru won by 2 runs
M. Chinnaswamy Stadium, Bengaluru
Umpires: Mohit Krishnadas (Ind) and Nitin Menon (Ind)
Player of the match: Romario Shepherd (Royal Challengers Bengaluru)

- Chennai Super Kings won the toss and elected to field.

Match 58
17 May 2025
19:30 (N)
Scorecard

Royal Challengers Bengaluru (H)	v	Kolkata Knight Riders

Match abandoned
M. Chinnaswamy Stadium, Bengaluru
Umpires: K. N. Ananthapadmanabhan (Ind) and Nitin Menon (Ind)

- No toss.
- No play was possible due to rain.
- This match was unchanged by the rescheduling.
- Kolkata Knight Riders were eliminated as a result of this match.

Match 65
23 May 2025
19:30 (N)
Scorecard

Sunrisers Hyderabad; 231/6 (20 overs)	v	Royal Challengers Bengaluru (H); 189 (19.5 overs)
Ishan Kishan 94* (48); Romario Shepherd 2/14 (2 overs)		Phil Salt 62 (32); Pat Cummins 3/28 (4 overs)

Sunrisers Hyderabad won by 42 runs
Ekana Cricket Stadium, Lucknow
Umpires: Michael Gough (Eng) and Kannur Swaroopanand (Ind)
Player of the match: Ishan Kishan (Sunrisers Hyderabad)

- Royal Challengers Bengaluru won the toss and elected to field.
- This match was originally scheduled for 13 May at M. Chinnaswamy Stadium, before being rescheduled to the same venue, but was later moved to Lucknow due to the weather conditions in Bengaluru.

Match 70
27 May 2025
19:30 (N)
Scorecard

Lucknow Super Giants (H); 227/3 (20 overs)	v	Royal Challengers Bengaluru; 230/4 (18.4 overs)
Rishabh Pant 118* (61); Nuwan Thushara 1/26 (4 overs)		Jitesh Sharma 85* (33); Will O'Rourke 2/74 (4 overs)

Royal Challengers Bengaluru won by 6 wickets
Ekana Cricket Stadium, Lucknow
Umpires: Michael Gough (Eng) and Virender Sharma (Ind)
Player of the match: Jitesh Sharma (Royal Challengers Bengaluru)

- Royal Challengers Bengaluru won the toss and elected to field.
- This match was originally scheduled for 9 May at the same venue, before being rescheduled.

== Playoffs ==
=== Bracket ===
Qualifier 1
29 May 2025 – Mullanpur
1	Punjab Kings	101 (14.1 overs)
2	Royal Challengers Bengaluru	106/2 (10 overs)
Eliminator
30 May 2025 – Mullanpur
3	Gujarat Titans	208/6 (20 overs)
4	Mumbai Indians	228/5 (20 overs)

Qualifier 2
1 June 2025 – Ahmedabad
Q1L	Punjab Kings	207/5 (19 overs)
EW	Mumbai Indians	203/6 (20 overs)

Final
3 June 2025 – Ahmedabad
Q1W	Royal Challengers Bengaluru	190/9 (20 overs)
Q2W	Punjab Kings	184/7 (20 overs)

=== Qualifier 1 ===
Qualifier 1
29 May 2025
19:30 (N)
Scorecard

Punjab Kings; 101 (14.1 overs)	v	Royal Challengers Bengaluru; 106/2 (10 overs)
Marcus Stoinis 26 (17); Suyash Sharma 3/17 (3 overs)		Phil Salt 56* (27); Kyle Jamieson 1/27 (3 overs)

Royal Challengers Bengaluru won by 8 wickets
Maharaja Yadavindra Singh International Cricket Stadium, Mullanpur
Umpires: Michael Gough (Eng) and Virender Sharma (Ind)
Player of the match: Suyash Sharma (Royal Challengers Bengaluru)

- Royal Challengers Bengaluru won the toss and elected to field.
- This match was originally scheduled for 20 May at the Rajiv Gandhi Stadium, before being rescheduled.
- Musheer Khan (Punjab Kings) made his T20 debut.
- Royal Challengers Bengaluru qualified for their fourth IPL final after 2009, 2011 and 2016.

=== Final ===
Final
3 June 2025
19:30 (N)
Scorecard

Royal Challengers Bengaluru; 190/9 (20 overs)	v	Punjab Kings; 184/7 (20 overs)
Virat Kohli 43 (35); Arshdeep Singh 3/40 (4 overs)		Shashank Singh 61* (30); Krunal Pandya 2/17 (4 overs)

Royal Challengers Bengaluru won by 6 runs
Narendra Modi Stadium, Ahmedabad
Attendance: 91,419
Umpires: Jayaraman Madanagopal (Ind) and Nitin Menon (Ind)
Player of the match: Krunal Pandya (Royal Challengers Bengaluru)

- Punjab Kings won the toss and elected to field.
- This match was originally scheduled for 25 May at the Eden Gardens, before being rescheduled.
- Royal Challengers Bengaluru won their maiden title after 18 years.

== Statistics ==
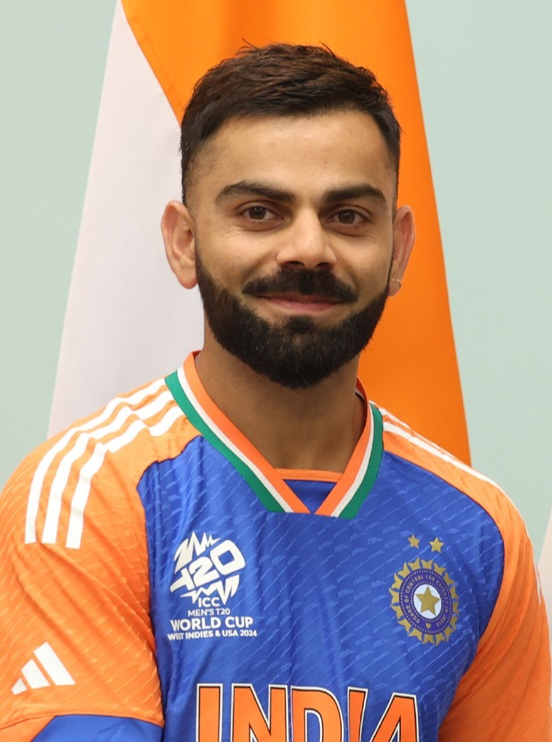
Virat Kohli scored the most runs (657) for Royal Challengers Bengaluru in the 2025 Indian Premier League.

Most runs
Runs	Player
657	Virat Kohli
403	Phil Salt
312	Rajat Patidar
261	Jitesh Sharma
247	Devdutt Padikkal

Most wickets
Wickets	Player
22	Josh Hazlewood
17	Krunal Pandya
17	Bhuvneshwar Kumar
13	Yash Dayal
8	Suyash Sharma
