= 2024 Royal Challengers Bengaluru season =

2024 Indian Premier League cricket team

Royal Challengers Bengaluru
2024 season
- Coach: Andy Flower
- Captain: Faf du Plessis
- Ground(s): M. Chinnaswamy Stadium, Bengaluru
- League stage: 4th
- Eliminator: Lost
- Most runs: Virat Kohli (741)
- Most wickets: Yash Dayal (15)
- Most catches: Faf du Plessis (8)
- Most wicket-keeping dismissals: Anuj Rawat (5)

The 2024 season was the 17th season for the Indian Premier League franchise Royal Challengers Bengaluru. They were one of the ten teams competed in the 2024 Indian Premier League. They finished at the 6th position in previous season's league stage. RCB drew an average home attendance of 32,245 in the league during the season.

After their 7th win on 18 May 2024, Bengaluru qualified for the Playoffs. They finished the League stage at the 4th place with 7 wins and 7 losses, garnering 14 points and seeding their place in the Eliminator.

After being defeated by Rajasthan Royals in the Eliminator played on 22 May at Ahmedabad, Bengaluru were eliminated from the tournament. They finished at the 4th place in the tournament after losing the Eliminator.

Virat Kohli scored the most runs in the season (741) and was awarded with ₹10 lakh (US$13,000) cash prize along with the Orange Cap.

== Squad ==
- Source: ESPNcricinfo
- Players with international caps are listed in **bold**.
- * denotes a player who was unavailable for rest of the season.

Royal Challengers Bengaluru squad for the 2024 Indian Premier League
No.	Name	Nat	Birth date	Batting style	Bowling style	Signed year	Salary	Notes
Captain
13	**Faf du Plessis**	(South Africa)	13 July 1984 (aged 39)	Right-handed	Right-arm leg-break	2022	₹7 crore (US$730,000)	Overseas
Batters
18	**Virat Kohli**	(India)	5 November 1988 (aged 35)	Right-handed	Right-arm medium	2008	₹15 crore (US$1.6 million)	Vice Captain
22	Saurav Chauhan	(India)	27 May 2000 (aged 23)	Left-handed	Right-arm off-break	2024	₹20 lakh (US$21,000)	
97	**Rajat Patidar**	(India)	1 June 1993 (aged 30)	Right-handed	Right-arm off-break	2022	₹20 lakh (US$21,000)	
43	Suyash Prabhudessai	(India)	6 December 1997 (aged 26)	Right-handed	Right-arm medium	2021	₹30 lakh (US$31,000)	
Wicket-keepers
19	**Dinesh Karthik**	(India)	1 June 1985 (aged 38)	Right-handed	Right-arm off-break	2022	₹5.5 crore (US$570,000)	
55	Anuj Rawat	(India)	17 October 1999 (aged 24)	Left-handed	—N/a	2022	₹3.4 crore (US$350,000)	
All-rounders
6	Mahipal Lomror	(India)	16 November 1999 (aged 24)	Left-handed	Left-arm orthodox	2022	₹95 lakh (US$99,000)	
9	**Will Jacks**	(England)	21 November 1998 (aged 25)	Right-handed	Right-arm off-break	2023	₹3.2 crore (US$330,000)	Overseas; Withdrawn (Note: English cricketers (including Will Jacks and Reece Topley) withdrew on 13 May 2024 due to the upcoming T20WC.)
32	**Glenn Maxwell**	(Australia)	14 October 1988 (aged 35)	Right-handed	Right-arm off-break	2021	₹11 crore (US$1.1 million)	Overseas
42	**Cameron Green**	(Australia)	3 June 1999 (aged 24)	Right-handed	Right-arm fast-medium	2024	₹17.5 crore (US$1.8 million)	Overseas; Traded (Note: Ahead of the 2024 auction, Cameron Green was traded from Mumbai Indians to Bengaluru.)
—N/a	**Tom Curran**	(England)	12 March 1995 (aged 29)	Right-handed	Right-arm fast-medium	2024	₹1.5 crore (US$160,000)	Overseas
—N/a	Manoj Bhandage	(India)	5 October 1998 (aged 25)	Left-handed	Right-arm medium-fast	2023	₹20 lakh (US$21,000)	
Pace bowlers
8	**Reece Topley**	(England)	21 February 1994 (aged 30)	Right-handed	Left-arm fast-medium	2023	₹1.9 crore (US$200,000)	Overseas; Withdrawn
11	**Akash Deep**	(India)	15 December 1996 (aged 27)	Right-handed	Right-arm fast-medium	2021	₹20 lakh (US$21,000)	
31	Vijaykumar Vyshak	(India)	21 January 1997 (aged 27)	Right-handed	Right-arm medium	2023	₹20 lakh (US$21,000)	
69	**Lockie Ferguson**	(New Zealand)	13 June 1991 (aged 32)	Right-handed	Right-arm fast	2024	₹2 crore (US$210,000)	Overseas
73	**Mohammed Siraj**	(India)	13 March 1994 (aged 30)	Right-handed	Right-arm fast	2018	₹7 crore (US$730,000)	
88	**Alzarri Joseph**	(Antigua and Barbuda)	20 November 1996 (aged 27)	Right-handed	Right-arm fast	2024	₹11.5 crore (US$1.2 million)	Overseas
103	Yash Dayal	(India)	13 December 1997 (aged 26)	Right-handed	Left-arm medium-fast	2024	₹5 crore (US$520,000)	
—N/a	Rajan Kumar	(India)	8 July 1996 (aged 27)	Left-handed	Left-arm medium-fast	2023	₹70 lakh (US$73,000)	
Spin bowlers
24	Swapnil Singh	(India)	22 January 1991 (aged 33)	Right-handed	Left-arm orthodox	2024	₹20 lakh (US$21,000)	
33	**Karn Sharma**	(India)	23 September 1987 (aged 36)	Left-handed	Right-arm leg-break	2022	₹50 lakh (US$52,000)	
44	Himanshu Sharma	(India)	6 June 1998 (aged 25)	Right-handed	Right-arm leg-break	2023	₹20 lakh (US$21,000)	
77	Mayank Dagar	(India)	11 November 1996 (aged 27)	Right-handed	Left-arm orthodox	2024	₹1.8 crore (US$190,000)	Traded (Note: Ahead of the 2024 auction, Mayank Dagar was traded from Sunrisers Hyderabad to Bengaluru.)

== Administration and support staff ==
Position	Name
CEO	Prathamesh Mishra
Team manager	Soumya Deep Pyne
Head coach	Andy Flower
Batting coach	
Bowling coach	Adam Griffith
Fielding coach	Malolan Rangarajan

== Sponsors ==
- Kit manufacturer: Puma
- Main shirt sponsor: Qatar Airways
- Back shirt sponsor: KEI
- Chest branding: Delhivery

== League stage ==
=== Points table ===
Pos	Grp	Team	Pld	W	L	NR	Pts	NRR	Qualification
1	A	Kolkata Knight Riders (C)	14	9	3	2	20	1.428	Advanced to Qualifier 1
2	B	Sunrisers Hyderabad (R)	14	8	5	1	17	0.414	Advanced to Qualifier 1
3	A	Rajasthan Royals (3rd)	14	8	5	1	17	0.273	Advanced to Eliminator
4	B	Royal Challengers Bengaluru (4th)	14	7	7	0	14	0.459	Advanced to Eliminator
5	B	Chennai Super Kings	14	7	7	0	14	0.392	Eliminated
6	A	Delhi Capitals	14	7	7	0	14	−0.377	Eliminated
7	A	Lucknow Super Giants	14	7	7	0	14	−0.667	Eliminated
8	B	Gujarat Titans	14	5	7	2	12	−1.063	Eliminated
9	B	Punjab Kings	14	5	9	0	10	−0.353	Eliminated
10	A	Mumbai Indians	14	4	10	0	8	−0.318	Eliminated

Source: ESPNcricinfo
(C) Champions; (R) Runners-up

=== League progression ===
League progression
Team	Group matches														Playoffs		
Team	1	2	3	4	5	6	7	8	9	10	11	12	13	14	Q1/E	Q2	F
Royal Challengers Bengaluru	0	2	2	2	2	2	2	2	4	6	8	10	12	14	L		

Win	Loss	No result

- Note: The total points at the end of each group match are listed.
- Note: Click on the points (group matches) or W/L (playoffs) to see the match summary.

=== Fixtures and results ===
Match 1
22 March 2024
20:00 (N)
Scorecard

Royal Challengers Bengaluru; 173/6 (20 overs)	v	Chennai Super Kings (H); 176/4 (18.4 overs)
Anuj Rawat 48 (25); Mustafizur Rahman 4/29 (4 overs)		Rachin Ravindra 37 (15); Cameron Green 2/27 (3 overs)

Chennai Super Kings won by 6 wickets
M. A. Chidambaram Stadium, Chennai
Umpires: Saiyed Khalid (Ind) and Virender Sharma (Ind)
Player of the match: Mustafizur Rahman (Chennai Super Kings)

- Royal Challengers Bengaluru won the toss and elected to bat.

Match 6
25 March 2024
19:30 (N)
Scorecard

Punjab Kings; 176/6 (20 overs)	v	Royal Challengers Bengaluru (H); 178/6 (19.2 overs)
Shikhar Dhawan 45 (37); Mohammed Siraj 2/26 (4 overs)		Virat Kohli 77 (49); Harpreet Brar 2/13 (4 overs)

Royal Challengers Bengaluru won by 4 wickets
M. Chinnaswamy Stadium, Bengaluru
Umpires: Anil Chaudhary (Ind) and Saidharshan Kumar (Ind)
Player of the match: Virat Kohli (Royal Challengers Bengaluru)

- Royal Challengers Bengaluru won the toss and elected to field.

Match 10
29 March 2024
19:30 (N)
Scorecard

(H) Royal Challengers Bengaluru; 182/6 (20 overs)	v	Kolkata Knight Riders; 186/3 (16.5 overs)
Virat Kohli 83* (59); Andre Russell 2/29 (4 overs)		Venkatesh Iyer 50 (30); Vijaykumar Vyshak 1/23 (4 overs)

Kolkata Knight Riders won by 7 wickets
M. Chinnaswamy Stadium, Bengaluru
Umpires: Anil Chaudhary (Ind) and Rohan Pandit (Ind)
Player of the match: Sunil Narine (Kolkata Knight Riders)

- Kolkata Knight Riders won the toss and elected to field.

Match 15
2 April 2024
19:30 (N)
Scorecard

Lucknow Super Giants; 181/5 (20 overs)	v	Royal Challengers Bengaluru (H); 153 (19.4 overs)
Quinton de Kock 81 (56); Glenn Maxwell 2/23 (4 overs)		Mahipal Lomror 33 (13); Mayank Yadav 3/14 (4 overs)

Lucknow Super Giants won by 28 runs
M. Chinnaswamy Stadium, Bengaluru
Umpires: Jayaraman Madanagopal (Ind) and Nikhil Patwardhan (Ind)
Player of the match: Mayank Yadav (Lucknow Super Giants)

- Royal Challengers Bengaluru won the toss and elected to field.

Match 19
6 April 2024
19:30 (N)
Scorecard

Royal Challengers Bengaluru; 183/3 (20 overs)	v	Rajasthan Royals (H); 189/4 (19.1 overs)
Virat Kohli 113* (72); Yuzvendra Chahal 2/34 (4 overs)		Jos Buttler 100* (58); Reece Topley 2/27 (4 overs)

Rajasthan Royals won by 6 wickets
Sawai Mansingh Stadium, Jaipur
Umpires: Tapan Sharma (Ind) and Alex Wharf (Eng)
Player of the match: Jos Buttler (Rajasthan Royals)

- Rajasthan Royals won the toss and elected to field.

Match 25
11 April 2024
19:30 (N)
Scorecard

Royal Challengers Bengaluru; 196/8 (20 overs)	v	Mumbai Indians (H); 199/3 (15.3 overs)
Faf du Plessis 61 (40); Jasprit Bumrah 5/21 (4 overs)		Ishan Kishan 69 (34); Will Jacks 1/24 (2 overs)

Mumbai Indians won by 7 wickets
Wankhede Stadium, Mumbai
Umpires: Nitin Menon (Ind) and Vineet Kulkarni (Ind)
Player of the match: Jasprit Bumrah (Mumbai Indians)

- Mumbai Indians won the toss and elected to field.

Match 30
15 April 2024
19:30 (N)
Scorecard

Sunrisers Hyderabad; 287/3 (20 overs)	v	Royal Challengers Bengaluru (H); 262/7 (20 overs)
Travis Head 102 (41); Lockie Ferguson 2/52 (4 overs)		Dinesh Karthik 83 (35); Pat Cummins 3/43 (4 overs)

Sunrisers Hyderabad won by 25 runs
M. Chinnaswamy Stadium, Bengaluru
Umpires: Anil Chaudhary (Ind) and Rohan Pandit (Ind)
Player of the match: Travis Head (Sunrisers Hyderabad)

- Royal Challengers Bengaluru won the toss and elected to field.
- Sunrisers Hyderabad broke their own record (277) for the highest innings total in IPL (287).
- Royal Challengers Bengaluru broke Mumbai Indians' record (246) for the highest second innings total in IPL (262), and South Africa's record (259) for the highest second innings total in T20 cricket. This was also the highest total in a losing cause in both IPL matches and T20 matches.
- The match broke the record for highest aggregate scored in an IPL match surpassing 523 runs between Sunrisers Hyderabad and Mumbai Indians in 2024 (549).

Match 36
21 April 2024
15:30 (D/N)
Scorecard

(H) Kolkata Knight Riders; 222/6 (20 overs)	v	Royal Challengers Bengaluru; 221 (20 overs)
Shreyas Iyer 50 (36); Cameron Green 2/35 (4 overs)		Will Jacks 55 (32); Andre Russell 3/25 (3 overs)

Kolkata Knight Riders won by 1 run
Eden Gardens, Kolkata
Umpires: Vinod Seshan (Ind) and Akshay Totre (Ind)
Player of the match: Andre Russell (Kolkata Knight Riders)

- Royal Challengers Bengaluru won the toss and elected to field.

Match 41
25 April 2024
19:30 (N)
Scorecard

Royal Challengers Bengaluru; 206/7 (20 overs)	v	Sunrisers Hyderabad (H); 171/8 (20 overs)
Virat Kohli 51 (43); Jaydev Unadkat 3/30 (4 overs)		Shahbaz Ahmed 40* (37); Cameron Green 2/12 (2 overs)

Royal Challengers Bengaluru won by 35 runs
Rajiv Gandhi International Cricket Stadium, Hyderabad
Umpires: Nitin Menon (Ind) and Saiyed Khalid (Ind)
Player of the match: Rajat Patidar (Royal Challengers Bengaluru)

- Royal Challengers Bengaluru won the toss and elected to bat.

Match 45
28 April 2024
15:30 (D/N)
Scorecard

(H) Gujarat Titans; 200/3 (20 overs)	v	Royal Challengers Bengaluru; 206/1 (16 overs)
Sai Sudharsan 84* (49); Swapnil Singh 1/23 (3 overs)		Will Jacks 100* (41); R. Sai Kishore 1/30 (3 overs)

Royal Challengers Bengaluru won by 9 wickets
Narendra Modi Stadium, Ahmedabad
Umpires: Nitin Menon (Ind) and Virender Sharma (Ind)
Player of the match: Will Jacks (Royal Challengers Bengaluru)

- Royal Challengers Bengaluru won the toss and elected to field.

Match 52
4 May 2024
19:30 (N)
Scorecard

Gujarat Titans; 147 (19.3 overs)	v	Royal Challengers Bengaluru (H); 152/6 (13.4 overs)
Shahrukh Khan 37 (24); Yash Dayal 2/21 (4 overs)		Faf du Plessis 64 (23); Josh Little 4/45 (4 overs)

Royal Challengers Bengaluru won by 4 wickets
M. Chinnaswamy Stadium, Bengaluru
Umpires: Vinod Seshan (Ind) and Akshay Totre (Ind)
Player of the match: Mohammed Siraj (Royal Challengers Bengaluru)

- Royal Challengers Bengaluru won the toss and elected to field.

Match 58
9 May 2024
19:30 (N)
Scorecard

Royal Challengers Bengaluru; 241/7 (20 overs)	v	Punjab Kings (H); 181 (17 overs)
Virat Kohli 92 (47); Harshal Patel 3/38 (4 overs)		Rilee Rossouw 61 (27); Mohammed Siraj 3/43 (4 overs)

Royal Challengers Bengaluru won by 60 runs
HPCA Stadium, Dharamshala
Umpires: Saiyed Khalid (Ind) and Nitin Menon (Ind)
Player of the match: Virat Kohli (Royal Challengers Bengaluru)

- Punjab Kings won the toss and elected to field.
- Punjab Kings were eliminated from the playoffs as a result of this match.

Match 62
12 May 2024
19:30 (N)
Scorecard

(H) Royal Challengers Bengaluru; 187/9 (20 overs)	v	Delhi Capitals; 140 (19.1 overs)
Rajat Patidar 52 (32); Rasikh Salam 2/23 (3 overs)		Axar Patel 57 (39); Yash Dayal 3/20 (3.1 overs)

Royal Challengers Bengaluru won by 47 runs
M. Chinnaswamy Stadium, Bengaluru
Umpires: Nand Kishore (Ind) and Vineet Kulkarni (Ind)
Player of the match: Cameron Green (Royal Challengers Bengaluru)

- Delhi Capitals won the toss and elected to field.

Match 68
18 May 2024
19:30 (N)
Scorecard

(H) Royal Challengers Bengaluru; 218/5 (20 overs)	v	Chennai Super Kings; 191/7 (20 overs)
Faf du Plessis 54 (39); Shardul Thakur 2/61 (4 overs)		Rachin Ravindra 61 (37); Yash Dayal 2/42 (4 overs)

Royal Challengers Bengaluru won by 27 runs
M. Chinnaswamy Stadium, Bengaluru
Umpires: K. N. Ananthapadmanabhan (Ind) and Akshay Totre (Ind)
Player of the match: Faf du Plessis (Royal Challengers Bengaluru)

- Chennai Super Kings won the toss and elected to field.
- Royal Challengers Bengaluru qualified for the playoffs while Chennai Super Kings were eliminated from the playoffs as a result of this match.

== Playoffs ==
=== Bracket ===
Qualifier 1
21 May 2024 – Ahmedabad
1	Kolkata Knight Riders	164/2 (13.4 overs)
2	Sunrisers Hyderabad	159 (19.3 overs)
Eliminator
22 May 2024 – Ahmedabad
3	Rajasthan Royals	174/6 (19 overs)
4	Royal Challengers Bengaluru	172/8 (20 overs)

Qualifier 2
24 May 2024 – Chennai
Q1L	Sunrisers Hyderabad	175/9 (20 overs)
EW	Rajasthan Royals	139/7 (20 overs)

Final
26 May 2024 – Chennai
Q1W	Kolkata Knight Riders	114/2 (10.3 overs)
Q2W	Sunrisers Hyderabad	113 (18.3 overs)

=== Eliminator ===
Eliminator
22 May 2024
19:30 (N)
Scorecard

Royal Challengers Bengaluru; 172/8 (20 overs)	v	Rajasthan Royals; 174/6 (19 overs)
Rajat Patidar 34 (22); Avesh Khan 3/44 (4 overs)		Yashasvi Jaiswal 45 (30); Mohammed Siraj 2/33 (4 overs)

Rajasthan Royals won by 4 wickets
Narendra Modi Stadium, Ahmedabad
Umpires: K. N. Ananthapadmanabhan (Ind) and Saidharshan Kumar (Ind)
Player of the match: Ravichandran Ashwin (Rajasthan Royals)

- Rajasthan Royals won the toss and elected to field.

== Statistics ==
Most runs
Runs	Player
741	Virat Kohli
438	Faf du Plessis
395	Rajat Patidar
326	Dinesh Karthik
255	Cameron Green

Most wickets
Wickets	Player
15	Yash Dayal
15	Mohammed Siraj
10	Cameron Green
9	Lockie Ferguson
7	Karn Sharma
