= 2022 Royal Challengers Bangalore season =

Indian Premier League cricket team season

Royal Challengers Bangalore
2022 season
- Coach: Sanjay Bangar
- Captain: Faf du Plessis
- Ground(s): M. Chinnaswamy Stadium, Bengaluru
- League stage: 4th
- Eliminator: Won
- Qualifier 2: Lost
- Most runs: Faf du Plessis (468)
- Most wickets: Wanindu Hasaranga (26)

The 2022 season was the 15th season of the Indian Premier League for cricket franchise Royal Challengers Bangalore which is based in Bangalore, Karnataka. They were one of the ten teams to compete in the edition. Faf Du Plessis was the captain. Sanjay Bangar was the coach.

== Background ==
The team retained three players ahead of the 2022 mega-auction.

Retained
Virat Kohli, Glenn Maxwell, Mohammad Siraj.
Released
Sachin Baby, Rajat Patidar, Tim David, Suyash Prabhudessai, Devdutt Padikkal, Dan Christian, Pavan Deshpande, Daniel Sams, Shahbaz Ahmed, Washington Sundar, AB de Villiers (Retired), K. S. Bharat, Mohammed Azharuddeen, Josh Philippe, Finn Allen, Yuzvendra Chahal, Adam Zampa, Harshal Patel, Kane Richardson, Scott Kuggeleijn, Dushmantha Chameera, Navdeep Saini, Kyle Jamieson, Akash Deep, George Garton.
Acquired during the auction
Shahbaz Ahmed, Wanindu Hasaranga, Harshal Patel, Finn Allen, Faf du Plessis, Mahipal Lomror, David Willey, Sherfane Rutherford, Suyash Prabhudessai, Aneeshwar Gautam, Dinesh Karthik, Anuj Rawat, Siddarth Kaul, Akash Deep, Luvnith Sisodia, Karn Sharma, Josh Hazlewood, Jason Behrendorff, Chama Milind.

== Squad ==
- Players with international caps are listed in **bold**
- Squad strength: 25 (18 - Indian, 7 - overseas)

No.	Name	Nationality	Birth date	Batting style	Bowling style	Year signed	Notes
Captain
13	**Faf du Plessis**	South Africa	13 July 1984 (aged 37)	Right-handed	Right-arm leg-break	2022	Overseas
Batters
18	**Virat Kohli**	India	5 November 1988 (aged 33)	Right-handed	Right-arm medium	2008	
43	Suyash Prabhudessai	India	6 December 1997 (aged 24)	Right-handed	Right-arm medium	2021	
97	Rajat Patidar	India	1 June 1993 (aged 28)	Right-handed	Right-arm off break	2021	Replacement for Luvnith Sisodia
	**Finn Allen**	New Zealand	22 April 1999 (aged 22)	Right-handed	Right-arm off-break	2021	Overseas
All-rounders
16	Mahipal Lomror	India	16 November 1999 (aged 22)	Left-handed	Slow left-arm orthodox	2022	
21	Shahbaz Ahmed	India	12 December 1994 (aged 27)	Left-handed	Slow left-arm orthodox	2020	
32	**Glenn Maxwell**	Australia	14 October 1988 (aged 33)	Right-handed	Right-arm off-break	2021	Overseas
49	**Wanindu Hasaranga**	Sri Lanka	29 July 1997 (aged 24)	Right-handed	Right-arm leg-break	2021	Overseas
50	**Sherfane Rutherford**	West Indies	15 August 1998 (aged 23)	Left-handed	Right-arm fast medium	2022	Overseas
	Aneeshwar Gautam	India	16 January 2003 (aged 19)	Left-handed	Slow left-arm orthodox	2022	
Wicket-keepers
19	**Dinesh Karthik**	India	1 June 1985 (aged 36)	Right-handed	Right-arm off-break	2022	
55	Anuj Rawat	India	17 October 1999 (aged 22)	Left-handed		2022	
	Luvnith Sisodia	India	15 January 2000 (aged 22)	Left-handed	Left-arm medium	2022	
Spin Bowlers
33	**Karn Sharma**	India	23 October 1987 (aged 34)	Right-handed	Right-arm leg-break	2022	
Pace Bowlers
1	**Siddarth Kaul**	India	19 May 1990 (aged 31)	Right-handed	Right-arm fast-medium	2022	
9	**Harshal Patel**	India	23 November 1990 (aged 31)	Right-handed	Right-arm fast medium	2021	
11	Akash Deep	India	15 December 1996 (aged 25)	Right-handed	Right-arm medium	2022	
15	**David Willey**	England	28 February 1990 (aged 32)	Left-handed	Left-arm fast medium	2022	Overseas
38	**Josh Hazlewood**	Australia	8 January 1991 (aged 31)	Left-handed	Right-arm fast-medium	2022	Overseas
73	**Mohammed Siraj**	India	13 March 1994 (aged 28)	Right-handed	Right-arm fast-medium	2018	
	**Jason Behrendorff**	Australia	20 April 1990 (aged 31)	Right-handed	Left-arm fast-medium	2022	Overseas
	Chama Milind	India	4 September 1994 (aged 27)	Left-handed	Left-arm medium	2022	
Source: RCB Players

== Personnel ==
Position	Name
Director of cricket operations	Mike Hesson
Head coach	Sanjay Bangar

== Teams and standings ==
=== Points table ===
Pos	Grp	Team	Pld	W	L	NR	Pts	NRR	Qualification
1	B	Gujarat Titans (C)	14	10	4	0	20	0.316	Advanced to Qualifier 1
2	A	Rajasthan Royals (R)	14	9	5	0	18	0.298	Advanced to Qualifier 1
3	A	Lucknow Super Giants (4th)	14	9	5	0	18	0.251	Advanced to Eliminator
4	B	Royal Challengers Bangalore (3rd)	14	8	6	0	16	−0.253	Advanced to Eliminator
5	A	Delhi Capitals	14	7	7	0	14	0.204	
6	B	Punjab Kings	14	7	7	0	14	0.126	
7	A	Kolkata Knight Riders	14	6	8	0	12	0.146	
8	B	Sunrisers Hyderabad	14	6	8	0	12	−0.379	
9	B	Chennai Super Kings	14	4	10	0	8	−0.203	
10	A	Mumbai Indians	14	4	10	0	8	−0.506	

Source: IPLT20.com
(C) Champions; (R) Runners-up
The four top-ranked teams qualified for the playoffs.

== Group stages ==
=== Matches ===
Match 3
27 March 2022
19:30 (N)
Scorecard

Royal Challengers Bangalore; 205/2 (20 overs)	v	Punjab Kings; 208/5 (19 overs)
Faf du Plessis 88 (57); Rahul Chahar 1/22 (4 overs)		Bhanuka Rajapaksa 43 (22); Mohammed Siraj 2/59 (4 overs)

Punjab Kings won by 5 wickets
DY Patil Stadium, Navi Mumbai
Umpires: Yeshwant Barde (Ind) and Nitin Menon (Ind)
Player of the match: Odean Smith (Punjab Kings)

- Punjab Kings won the toss and elected to field.
- Raj Bawa (Punjab Kings) made his T20 debut.
- Bhanuka Rajapaksa and Odean Smith (Punjab Kings) made their IPL debuts

Match 6
30 March 2022
19:30 (N)
Scorecard

Kolkata Knight Riders; 128 (18.5 overs)	v	Royal Challengers Bangalore; 132/7 (19.2 overs)
Andre Russell 25 (18); Wanindu Hasaranga 4/20 (4 overs)		Sherfane Rutherford 28 (40); Tim Southee 3/20 (4 overs)

Royal Challengers Bangalore won by 3 wickets
DY Patil Stadium, Navi Mumbai
Umpires: Jayaraman Madanagopal (Ind) and Navdeep Singh (Ind)
Player of the match: Wanindu Hasaranga (Royal Challengers Bangalore)

- Royal Challengers Bangalore won the toss and elected to field.

Match 13
5 April 2022
19:30 (N)
Scorecard

Rajasthan Royals; 169/3 (20 overs)	v	Royal Challengers Bangalore; 173/6 (19.1 overs)
Jos Buttler 70* (47); Harshal Patel 1/18 (4 overs)		Shahbaz Ahmed 45 (26); Yuzvendra Chahal 2/15 (4 overs)

Royal Challengers Bangalore won by 4 wickets
Wankhede Stadium, Mumbai
Umpires: Anil Chaudhary (Ind) and Saiyed Khalid (Ind)
Player of the match: Dinesh Karthik (Royal Challengers Bangalore)

- Royal Challengers Bangalore won the toss and elected to field.

Match 18
9 April 2022
19:30 (N)
Scorecard

Mumbai Indians; 151/6 (20 overs)	v	Royal Challengers Bangalore; 152/3 (18.3 overs)
Suryakumar Yadav 68* (37); Harshal Patel 2/23 (4 overs)		Anuj Rawat 66 (47); Dewald Brevis 1/8 (0.3 overs)

Royal Challengers Bangalore won by 7 wickets
MCA International Stadium, Pune
Umpires: K. N. Ananthapadmanabhan (Ind) and Bruce Oxenford (Aus)
Player of the match: Anuj Rawat (Royal Challengers Bangalore)

- Royal Challengers Bangalore won the toss and elected to field.

Match 22
12 April 2022
19:30 (N)
Scorecard

Chennai Super Kings; 216/4 (20 overs)	v	Royal Challengers Bangalore; 193/9 (20 overs)
Shivam Dube 95* (46); Wanindu Hasaranga 2/35 (3 overs)		Shahbaz Ahmed 41 (27); Maheesh Theekshana 4/33 (4 overs)

Chennai Super Kings won by 23 runs
DY Patil Stadium, Navi Mumbai
Umpires: Nitin Menon (Ind) and Nitin Pandit (Ind)
Player of the match: Shivam Dube (Chennai Super Kings)

- Royal Challengers Bangalore won the toss and elected to field.

Match 27
16 April 2022
19:30 (N)
Scorecard

Royal Challengers Bangalore; 189/5 (20 overs)	v	Delhi Capitals; 173/7 (20 overs)
Dinesh Karthik 66* (34); Shardul Thakur 1/27 (4 overs)		David Warner 66 (38); Josh Hazlewood 3/28 (4 overs)

Royal Challengers Bangalore won by 16 runs
Wankhede Stadium, Mumbai
Umpires: Jayaraman Madanagopal (Ind) and Chirra Ravikanthreddy (Ind)
Player of the match: Dinesh Karthik (Royal Challengers Bangalore)

- Delhi Capitals won the toss and elected to field.

Match 31
19 April 2022
19:30 (N)
Scorecard

Royal Challengers Bangalore; 181/6 (20 overs)	v	Lucknow Super Giants; 163/8 (20 overs)
Faf du Plessis 96 (64); Jason Holder 2/25 (4 overs)		Krunal Pandya 42 (28); Josh Hazlewood 4/25 (4 overs)

Royal Challengers Bangalore won by 18 runs
DY Patil Stadium, Navi Mumbai
Umpires: Chris Gaffaney (NZ) and Nitin Pandit (Ind)
Player of the match: Faf du Plessis (Royal Challengers Bangalore)

- Lucknow Super Giants won the toss and elected to field.

Match 36
23 April 2022
19:30 (N)
Scorecard

Royal Challengers Bangalore; 68 (16.1 overs)	v	Sunrisers Hyderabad; 72/1 (8 overs)
Suyash Prabhudessai 15 (20); T Natarajan 3/13 (3 overs)		Abhishek Sharma 47 (28); Harshal Patel 2/18 (2 overs)

Sunrisers Hyderabad won by 9 wickets
Brabourne Stadium, Mumbai
Umpires: Jayaraman Madanagopal (Ind) and Chirra Ravikanthreddy (Ind)
Player of the match: Marco Jansen (Sunrisers Hyderabad)

- Sunrisers Hyderabad won the toss and elected to field.

Match 39
26 April 2022
19:30 (N)
Scorecard

Rajasthan Royals; 144/8 (20 overs)	v	Royal Challengers Bangalore; 115 (19.3 overs)
Riyan Parag 56* (31); Josh Hazlewood 2/19 (4 overs)		Faf du Plessis 23 (21); Kuldeep Sen 4/20 (3.3 overs)

Rajasthan Royals won by 29 runs
MCA International Stadium, Pune
Umpires: K. N. Ananthapadmanabhan (Ind) and Bruce Oxenford (Aus)
Player of the match: Riyan Parag (Rajasthan Royals)

- Royal Challengers Bangalore won the toss and elected to field.

Match 43
30 April 2022
15:30 (D/N)
Scorecard

Royal Challengers Bangalore; 170/6 (20 overs)	v	Gujarat Titans; 174/4 (19.3 overs)
Virat Kohli 58 (53); Pradeep Sangwan 2/19 (4 overs)		Rahul Tewatia 43* (25); Shahbaz Ahmed 2/26 (3 overs)

Gujarat Titans won by 6 wickets
Brabourne Stadium, Mumbai
Umpires: Saiyed Khalid (Ind) and Virender Sharma (Ind)
Player of the match: Rahul Tewatia (Gujarat Titans)

- Royal Challengers Bangalore won the toss and elected to bat.

Match 49
4 May 2022
19:30 (N)
Scorecard

Royal Challengers Bangalore; 173/8 (20 overs)	v	Chennai Super Kings; 160/8 (20 overs)
Mahipal Lomror 42 (27); Maheesh Theekshana 3/27 (4 overs)		Devon Conway 56 (37); Harshal Patel 3/35 (4 overs)

Royal Challengers Bangalore won by 13 runs
MCA International Stadium, Pune
Umpires: K. N. Ananthapadmanabhan (Ind) and Michael Gough (Eng)
Player of the match: Harshal Patel (Royal Challengers Bangalore)

- Chennai Super Kings won the toss and elected to field.

Match 54
8 May 2022
15:30 (D/N)
Scorecard

Royal Challengers Bangalore; 192/3 (20 overs)	v	Sunrisers Hyderabad; 125 (19.2 overs)
Faf du Plessis 73* (50); Jagadeesha Suchith 2/30 (4 overs)		Rahul Tripathi 58 (37); Wanindu Hasaranga 5/18 (4 overs)

Royal Challengers Bangalore won by 67 runs
Wankhede Stadium, Mumbai
Umpires: Marais Erasmus (SA) and Nitin Pandit (Ind)
Player of the match: Wanindu Hasaranga (Royal Challengers Bangalore)

- Royal Challengers Bangalore won the toss and elected to bat.

Match 60
13 May 2022
19:30 (N)
Scorecard

Punjab Kings; 209/9 (20 overs)	v	Royal Challengers Bangalore; 155/9 (20 overs)
Liam Livingstone 70 (42); Harshal Patel 4/34 (4 overs)		Glenn Maxwell 35 (22); Kagiso Rabada 3/21 (4 overs)

Punjab Kings won by 54 runs
Brabourne Stadium, Mumbai
Umpires: Jayaraman Madanagopal (Ind) and Nitin Pandit (Ind)
Player of the match: Jonny Bairstow (Punjab Kings)

- Royal Challengers Bangalore won the toss and elected to field.

Match 67
19 May 2022
19:30 (N)
Scorecard

Gujarat Titans; 168/5 (20 overs)	v	Royal Challengers Bangalore; 170/2 (18.4 overs)
Hardik Pandya 62* (47); Josh Hazlewood 2/39 (4 overs)		Virat Kohli 73 (54); Rashid Khan 2/32 (4 overs)

Royal Challengers Bangalore won by 8 wickets
Wankhede Stadium, Mumbai
Umpires: K. N. Ananthapadmanabhan (Ind) and Sadashiv Iyer (Ind)
Player of the match: Virat Kohli (Royal Challengers Bangalore)

- Gujarat Titans won the toss and elected to bat.
- Punjab Kings and Sunrisers Hyderabad were eliminated as a result of this match.

== Playoffs ==
=== Preliminary ===
==== Eliminator ====
25 May 2022
19:30 (N)
Scorecard

Royal Challengers Bangalore; 207/4 (20 overs)	v	Lucknow Super Giants; 193/6 (20 overs)
Rajat Patidar 112* (54); Mohsin Khan 1/25 (4 overs)		KL Rahul 79 (58); Josh Hazlewood 3/43 (4 overs)

Royal Challengers Bangalore won by 14 runs
Eden Gardens, Kolkata
Umpires: Michael Gough (Eng) and Jayaraman Madanagopal (Ind)
Player of the match: Rajat Patidar (Royal Challengers Bangalore)

- Lucknow Super Giants won the toss and elected to field.
- Royal Challengers Bangalore advance to Qualifier 2 and Lucknow Super Giants were eliminated as a result of this match.

==== Qualifier 2 ====
27 May 2022
19:30 (N)
Scorecard

Royal Challengers Bangalore; 157/8 (20 overs)	v	Rajasthan Royals; 161/3 (18.1 overs)
Rajat Patidar 58 (42); Prasidh Krishna 3/22 (4 overs)		Jos Buttler 106* (60); Josh Hazlewood 2/23 (4 overs)

Rajasthan Royals won by 7 wickets
Narendra Modi Stadium, Ahmedabad
Umpires: Chris Gaffaney (NZ) and Nitin Menon (Ind)
Player of the match: Jos Buttler (Rajasthan Royals)

- Rajasthan Royals won the toss and elected to field.
