= Himanshu Sharma (cricketer) =

Indian cricketer (born 1998)

Personal information
- Born: 6 June 1998 (age 27)
- Batting: Right-handed
- Bowling: Right-arm leg-break
- Role: Bowler

Domestic team information
- Years: Team
- 2023–2024: Royal Challengers Bengaluru
- Source: ESPNcricinfo, 25 February 2024

Himanshu Sharma is an Indian cricketer. He played for Royal Challengers Bengaluru in the Indian Premier League. He is a bowler who bowls leg spin and bats right-handed.

== Early life ==
Himanshu hails from Sikar which is a small town in Rajasthan about approximately 100 km far away from Jaipur. He began playing his cricket in Sikar but soon moved to Jaipur in order to take up and pursue the sport of cricket seriously. He had never played competitive cricket at any level and only began playing cricket in 2017. His father was a volleyball player who played at state level for Rajasthan before becoming a teacher.

== Career ==
Himanshu's talent was spotted by the scouting team of the Royal Challengers Bangalore as part of RCB's Hinterland Scouting system, just a year prior to the buildup ahead of highly anticipated 2023 IPL auction. The Hinterland Scouting system deployed by RCB franchise significantly uses Artificial intelligence to cash in and find talents from several relatively less known areas of India.

He was also invited for trials by Royal Challengers Bangalore camp even before he was actually purchased by RCB during the 2023 IPL auction which was held in December 2022. He was tested by the team head coach Sanjay Bangar and by the spin bowling coach Sridharan Sriram who were left impressed by his trials.

In February 2023, he was bought by Royal Challengers Bangalore during the auction for the 2023 Indian Premier League for INR 20 lakhs. Prior to being bought by RCB at the 2023 IPL auction, much to the surprise Himanshu Sharma had never played competitive cricket.

On 21 May 2023, during the last group league phase clash between Royal Challengers Bangalore and defending champions Gujarat Titans which was also the 70th match of the 2023 Indian Premier League, he was listed by Royal Challengers Bangalore as one of their impact substitution players alongside Finn Allen, Suyash Prabhudessai, Sonu Yadav and Akash Deep when the final playing XI was announced by RCB after the toss. Himanshu even pushed RCB's premier legspinner Karn Sharma in the pecking order in the Impact Player Sub options for RCB especially in a do-or-die virtual knockout match for home side Royal Challengers Bangalore which was indeed a must win match in order to secure playoff spot.

He was introduced by skipper Faf du Plessis in the bowling attack shortly after the end of Gujarat Titans powerplay. He eventually made his IPL debut as well as T20 debut during the second innings of the match between Royal Challengers Bangalore and Gujarat Titans.

== Biography ==
There are discrepancies over his birth date. His birthdate has been mentioned as 6 June 1998 in his IPL website profile whereas his franchise Royal Challengers Bangalore mentions his birthdate as 1 November 1998.
