= Royal Challengers Bengaluru =

Bengaluru-based cricket franchise in the Indian Premier League

- Nickname: RCB
- League: Indian Premier League

Personnel
- Captain: Rajat Patidar (2025–present)
- Coach: Andy Flower (2024–present)
- Batting coach: Dinesh Karthik (2025–present)
- Fielding coach: Richard Halsall (2024–present)
- Owner: Aditya Birla Group; The Times Group; Blackstone (2026–present)

Team information
- City: Bengaluru, Karnataka
- Colours: Red & black
- Founded: 2008; 18 years ago
- Home ground: M. Chinnaswamy Stadium
- Capacity: 35,000

History
- Indian Premier League wins: 2 (2025, 2026)
- Official website: Website
Regular kit
Green kit

The Royal Challengers Bengaluru, also known as RCB, formerly the Royal Challengers Bangalore, are a professional Twenty20 cricket team based in Bengaluru, Karnataka, that competes in the Indian Premier League (IPL).

They won their first title in 2025 and their second title in 2026. The team finished as the runners-up on three occasions in 2009, 2011, and 2016, and have also qualified for the playoffs in eleven of the nineteen seasons.

As of 2026, the team is captained by Rajat Patidar and coached by Andy Flower. The franchise has competed in the Champions League Twenty20, finishing as runners-up in the 2011 season. As of 2024, RCB's brand value was estimated at $117 million, making it one of the most valuable IPL brands.

Established in 2008, the franchise was purchased by United Spirits and later acquired by a consortium comprising the Aditya Birla Group, The Times Group and Blackstone in 2026. The team was acquired for a record $1.78 billion, representing the highest valuation for a franchise in IPL history.

== History ==
=== 2008–2010: Initial seasons ===
In September 2007, the Board of Control for Cricket in India announced the establishment of the Indian Premier League (IPL) a Twenty20 competition set to begin in 2008. On 24 January 2008, an auction was held in Mumbai for the league's teams, which represented eight different cities in India, including Bengaluru. The Bangalore franchise was acquired by Vijay Mallya for US$111.6 million, making it the second-highest bid, slightly less than Reliance Industries' US$111.9 million bid for the Mumbai Indians.

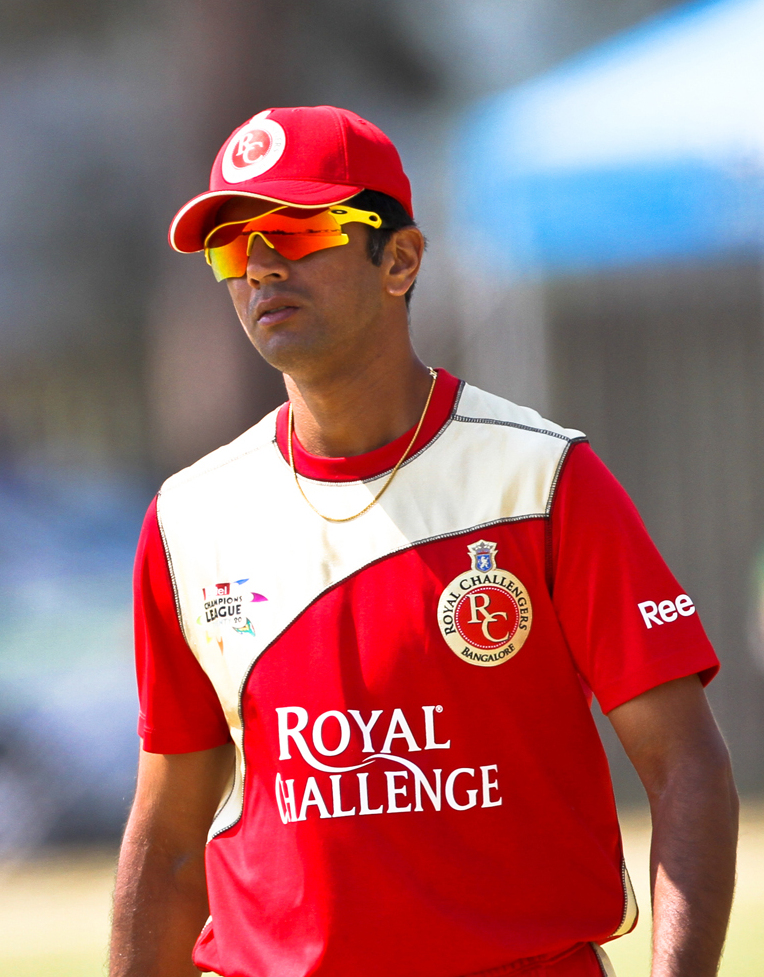
Rahul Dravid was the team's icon player in 2008.

Ahead of the 2008 player auction, the IPL designated Rahul Dravid as the icon player for the Bangalore franchise. This designation ensured that Dravid would be paid 15% more than the highest bid player at the auction. The franchise acquired several prominent Indian and international players, including Jacques Kallis, Anil Kumble, Zaheer Khan, Mark Boucher, Dale Steyn, and Cameron White. In the second round of the auction, they also signed Ross Taylor, Misbah-ul-Haq, and India under-19 World Cup-winning captain Virat Kohli. The franchise named Dravid as the captain of the team and appointed Venkatesh Prasad as the head coach. The team struggled in the inaugural season, winning only four out of their 14 matches and finishing seventh in the eight-team table. Dravid was the sole player to score more than 300 runs in the tournament, and the team even had to bench their most expensive foreign player, Kallis, for several matches due to his poor form. Midway through the season, the string of failures led to the sacking of CEO Charu Sharma, who was replaced by Brijesh Patel. Mallya publicly criticised Dravid and Sharma for their selection of players at the auction, stating that his "biggest mistake was to abstain from the selection of the team." Eventually, the chief cricketing officer of the franchise, Martin Crowe, resigned and Prasad was replaced by Ray Jennings as the head coach.

At the 2009 player auction, the franchise signed Kevin Pietersen for a record US$1.55 million, making him the most expensive player alongside Andrew Flintoff (Chennai Super Kings). They also traded Zaheer Khan for Robin Uthappa with the Mumbai Indians and brought in local batsman Manish Pandey. Due to general elections in India, the tournament was held in South Africa. Pietersen was named captain, but after a string of initial losses, Anil Kumble took over the captaincy when Pietersen left for national duty. RCB's performance improved under Kumble, winning six of their last eight matches to finish third in the league table. They defeated Chennai Super Kings in the semi-final but fell short by six runs in the final against Deccan Chargers.

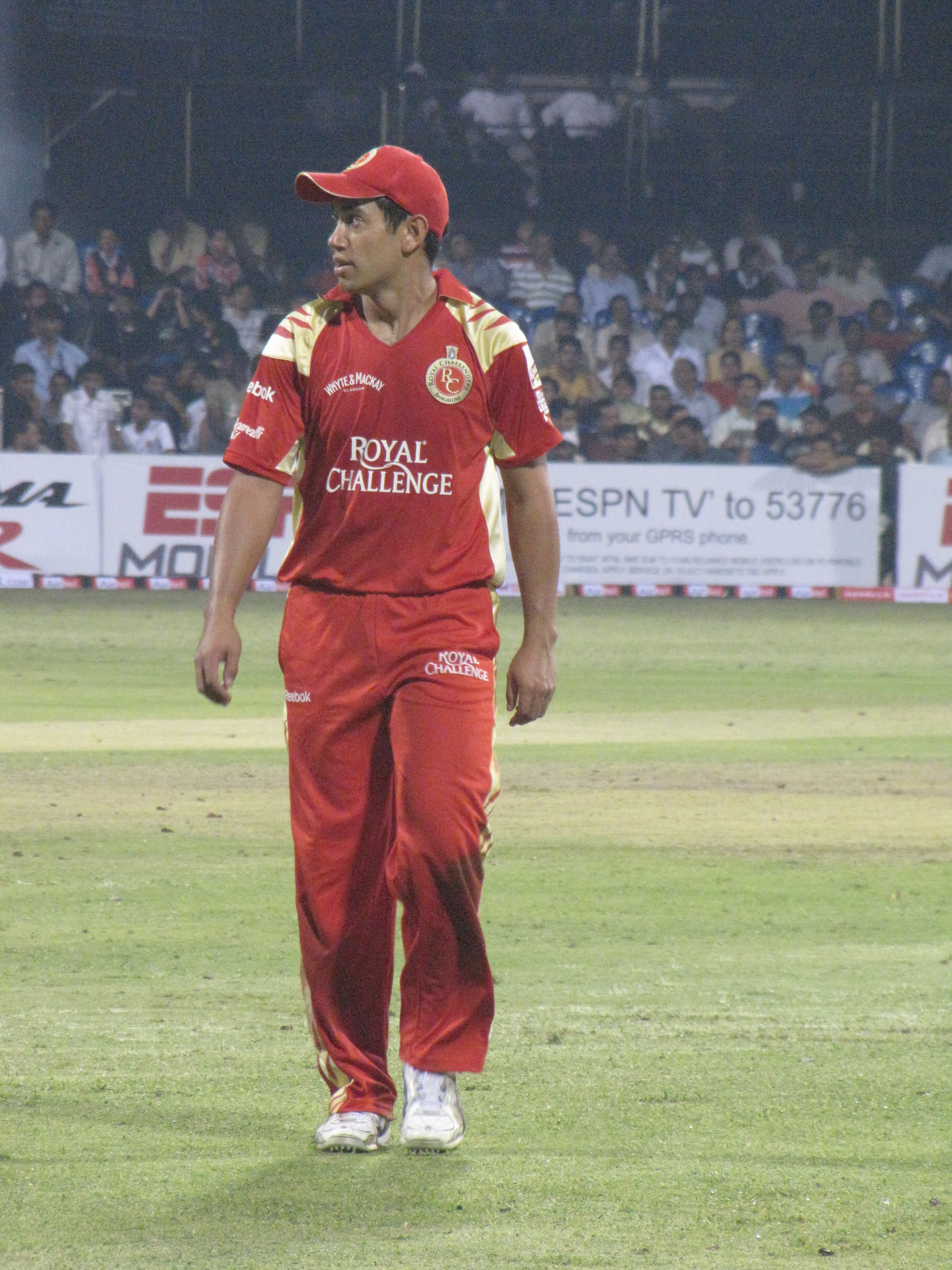
Ross Taylor was one of the top performers for RCB in 2009 and 2010.

In 2010, the Royal Challengers, under Kumble's captaincy, secured seven wins from 14 matches, accumulating 14 points. Tied with three other teams for a playoff spot, their superior net run rate qualified them for the semi-finals. In the semi-final, they were defeated by the table-toppers, the Mumbai Indians, by 35 runs. However, the Royal Challengers secured a convincing nine-wicket win over the defending champions, the Deccan Chargers, in the third-place playoff, thus qualifying for the 2010 Champions League Twenty20. Kumble retired at the conclusion of the Champions League, having led the team to the semi-finals of both the IPL and the CLT20 that year.

=== 2011–2012: IPL and CLT20 finals ===
On 8 January 2011, the IPL Governing Council held the auction for the fourth season of the league. Franchises had the option of retaining a maximum of four players for a sum of US$4.5 million. However, RCB retained only Virat Kohli, leaving their other players to re-enter the auction pool. During the auction, Bangalore made significant acquisitions, including Tillakaratne Dilshan, Zaheer Khan, AB de Villiers, Daniel Vettori, Saurabh Tiwary, Dirk Nannes, and Cheteshwar Pujara. Daniel Vettori was named captain for the season. RCB began their campaign with a win over the newly formed Kochi Tuskers Kerala. However, they faced three consecutive defeats against Mumbai Indians, Deccan Chargers, and Chennai Super Kings. Dirk Nannes was replaced by Chris Gayle because of an injury. Gayle's inclusion led RCB to a seven-match winning streak. In their final league match, RCB defeated defending champions Chennai Super Kings, securing the top position in the points table. They lost the final, again facing the Super Kings, by 58 runs. Chris Gayle was named Man of the Tournament. Royal Challengers Bangalore reached the 2011 Champions League Twenty20 semi-finals after finishing runner-up in the IPL. They won their final group match against Southern Redbacks on the last ball and beat New South Wales Blues in the semis. They lost the final to Mumbai Indians.

Before the 2012 auction, RCB retained Chris Gayle and secured Andrew McDonald from Delhi Daredevils. In the auction, RCB acquired Vinay Kumar and Muttiah Muralitharan. RCB began the 2012 IPL season without Chris Gayle, who was recovering from an injury. AB de Villiers and Muttiah Muralitharan contributed to a winning start against Delhi Daredevils. RCB won eight out of their sixteen games but failed to qualify for the playoffs. Gayle was the highest run-scorer of the tournament with 733 runs, including a century.

=== 2013–2015: Kohli's captaincy and intermediate seasons ===
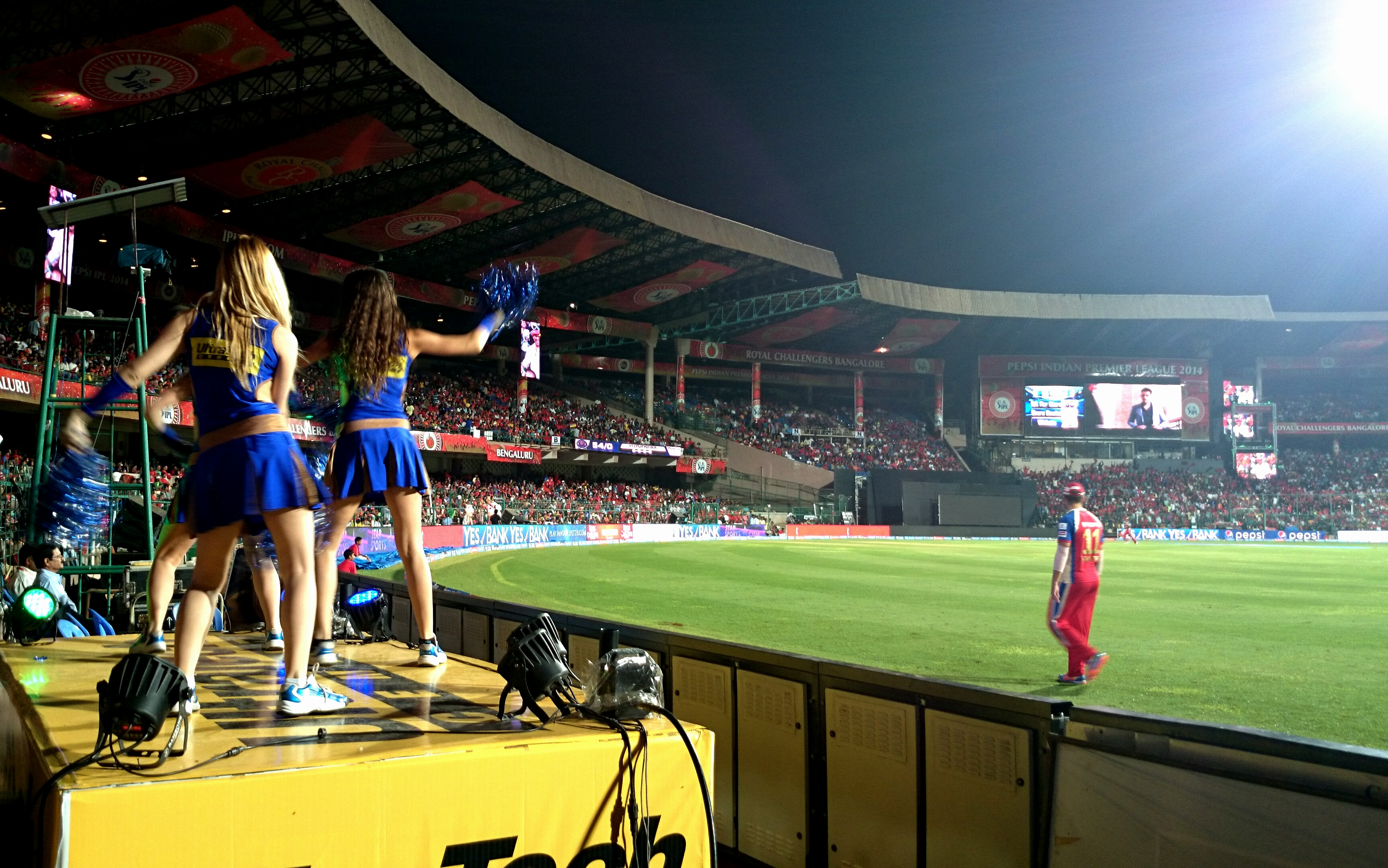
IPL 2014 RR vs RCB 11 May 2014 (13996262488)

Before the 2013 auction, RCB released Mohammad Kaif, Charl Langeveldt, Dirk Nannes, Luke Pomersbach, and Rilee Rossouw. At the auction, they acquired Christopher Barnwell, Daniel Christian, Moises Henriques, Ravi Rampaul, Pankaj Singh, R. P. Singh, and Jaydev Unadkat. Virat Kohli replaced Daniel Vettori as captain and remained in that role until 2021. During the IPL season, RCB finished fifth in the group stage points table with 9 wins from 16 matches, failing to qualify for the playoffs. Chris Gayle was the second highest run scorer of the tournament, behind Michael Hussey of the Chennai Super Kings, while Vinay Kumar was the team's highest wicket-taker with 23 wickets.

Before the 2014 auction, RCB retained AB de Villiers, Chris Gayle, and Virat Kohli from previous seasons. The players bought in the 2014 auction included Albie Morkel, Mitchell Starc, Parthiv Patel, Ashok Dinda, Nic Maddinson, Varun Aaron, Yuzvendra Chahal, Vijay Zol, and Yuvraj Singh, who was the most expensive player at ₹14 crore (equivalent to ₹24 crore or US$2.6 million in 2026), among others. Daniel Vettori replaced Ray Jennings as the head coach of the team. The first phase of the IPL was held in the UAE and the second phase in India. RCB finished 7th in the points table and did not qualify for the playoffs. De Villiers was the highest run-scorer for the team with 395 runs, while Varun Aaron took the most wickets, claiming 16.

Before the 2015 auction, RCB secured Manvinder Bisla from Kolkata Knight Riders and Iqbal Abdulla from Rajasthan Royals, as well as Mandeep Singh from Kings XI Punjab during the transfer window. In the auction, they bought Daren Sammy, Sean Abbott, Subramaniam Badrinath, Sarfaraz Khan, and Dinesh Karthik, among others. Royal Challengers started their season with a win against KKR at Eden Gardens in Kolkata. During the group stage, they won a total of seven out of fourteen matches, finishing in third place on the points table. In the playoffs, they defeated Rajasthan Royals in the Eliminator by 71 runs. However, in the second qualifier against the Chennai Super Kings, RCB lost by 3 wickets, knocking them out of the tournament. AB de Villiers, Virat Kohli, and Chris Gayle were the 4th, 5th, and 6th highest run-scorers of the season, respectively, while Yuzvendra Chahal was the team's highest wicket-taker and the 3rd highest overall in the season.

=== 2016–2019: Runners-up and bottom-table finishes ===
Amid financial scandals involving owner and chairman Vijay Mallya, Amrit Thomas became the chairman of the Royal Challengers. In the 2016 season, RCB introduced different jerseys for home and away matches. During the player auction, they acquired Shane Watson, Kane Richardson, Stuart Binny, Travis Head, and Samuel Badree, among others. Additionally, KL Rahul and Parvez Rasool joined RCB from Sunrisers Hyderabad. RCB won their first match of the season against Sunrisers, with AB de Villiers and Virat Kohli scoring 82 and 75 runs, respectively. However, they struggled in the next six matches, securing only one win against Rising Pune Supergiant, which made it challenging to qualify for the playoffs. However, RCB qualified for the playoffs, losing only one match in their next seven games. They set a record by defeating the Gujarat Lions with a winning margin of 144 runs, the highest in IPL history. (Note: The Mumbai Indians broke this record in the following season against the Delhi Daredevils.) RCB finished the group stage in second place on the points table with 16 points. In the playoffs, they faced Gujarat Lions in Qualifier 1 at their home ground, M. Chinnaswamy Stadium, and won by 4 wickets, advancing to their third final in nine seasons. In the final against Sunrisers Hyderabad in Bangalore, RCB lost by 8 runs, ending the season as runners-up for the third time in IPL history. Yuzvendra Chahal and Shane Watson were the second and third highest wicket-takers of the tournament, while Virat Kohli won the Orange Cap for scoring the most runs in the tournament, amassing 973 runs – the highest ever in IPL history.

In the 2017 player auctions, the Royal Challengers acquired Tymal Mills, Aniket Choudhary, Pawan Negi, Praveen Dubey, and Billy Stanlake. Mitchell Starc parted ways with the team to rehabilitate ahead of the Champions Trophy, prompting the management to replace him with Tymal Mills. The season for RCB was impacted by injuries, with skipper Virat Kohli and AB de Villiers missing the initial matches. This led to Shane Watson stepping in as the interim captain. Batsmen KL Rahul and Sarfaraz Khan were also ruled out for the season due to prolonged injuries. RCB finished at the bottom of the table, losing ten out of their fourteen matches. In a match against the Kolkata Knight Riders, RCB was all out for just 49 runs, marking the lowest score ever in an IPL match. Virat Kohli was the leading run-scorer for the team with 308 runs in the tournament, while Pawan Negi took the most wickets, claiming 16.

Ahead of the 2018 IPL, RCB retained Virat Kohli, AB de Villiers, and Sarfaraz Khan. During the auction, they acquired notable players such as Brendon McCullum, Chris Woakes, Colin de Grandhomme, Moeen Ali, Quinton de Kock, Umesh Yadav, and Yuzvendra Chahal, among others. In January 2018, Gary Kirsten was appointed as the batting coach, and Ashish Nehra took on the role of bowling coach. In the group stage, RCB finished sixth in the points table, failing to qualify for the playoffs. Virat Kohli was the team's leading run-scorer, while Umesh Yadav took the most wickets.

In August 2018, Gary Kirsten was appointed as the head coach of the Royal Challengers Bangalore, replacing Daniel Vettori. During the 2019 IPL auction, the team acquired Shivam Dube, Shimron Hetmyer, Heinrich Klaasen, and Devdutt Padikkal, along with other key players. During the season, Dale Steyn joined the team, replacing the injured Nathan Coulter-Nile. Steyn played only two games before being ruled out of the tournament due to a shoulder injury. In the group stage, RCB played 14 games, winning five, and finished at the bottom of the table. Virat Kohli was once again the highest run-scorer for the team, while Yuzvendra Chahal was the highest wicket-taker.

=== 2020–2023: Regain in form ===
In August 2019, Simon Katich replaced Gary Kirsten as the head coach of the team, and Mike Hesson was appointed as the director of cricket operations. Ahead of the 2020 IPL auction, RCB released several players, including Colin de Grandhomme, Dale Steyn, Heinrich Klaasen, Nathan Coulter-Nile, Akshdeep Nath, Marcus Stoinis, Shimron Hetmyer, and Tim Southee. During the auction, RCB added Aaron Finch, Chris Morris, Joshua Philippe, Kane Richardson, Pavan Deshpande, Dale Steyn, Shahbaz Ahmed, and Isuru Udana to their squad. They also released a new logo ahead of the season. The 2020 IPL season was postponed and eventually held in the UAE due to the COVID-19 pandemic. RCB qualified for the playoffs for the first time since 2016, finishing fourth on the points table with 14 points. They faced Sunrisers Hyderabad in the Eliminator but lost by six wickets. Devdutt Padikkal was the team's leading run-scorer with 473 runs, followed by Virat Kohli with 466 runs and AB de Villiers with 454 runs. Yuzvendra Chahal was the highest wicket-taker, taking 21 wickets, followed by Chris Morris and Mohammad Siraj, who each took 11 wickets.

During the 2021 IPL auction, RCB acquired Glenn Maxwell, Mohammed Azharuddeen, Sachin Baby, Kyle Jamieson, Srikar Bharat, Rajat Patidar, Dan Christian, and Suyash Prabhudessai. The season was suspended midway due to a sudden rise in COVID-19 cases among players and resumed in September in the UAE. Before the season's resumption, the team's head coach, Simon Katich, resigned, and Mike Hesson took over as head coach. RCB qualified for the playoffs by finishing third in the points table but failed to lift the trophy once again, losing to fourth placed Kolkata Knight Riders in the Eliminator. Harshal Patel finished the season with 32 wickets, equalling Dwayne Bravo's record for the highest number of wickets taken in a season and winning the Purple Cap. Glenn Maxwell was the highest run-scorer for the team with 513 runs, the fifth highest in the season. Virat Kohli became the first-ever batsman to score 6,000 runs in the IPL during this season. This season marked AB de Villiers's last in the IPL, as he announced his retirement in November 2021.

In the 2022 season, the Royal Challengers underwent significant changes. Faf du Plessis was announced as the new captain following Virat Kohli's decision to step down from the role after the 2021 season. Additionally, Sanjay Bangar was appointed as the new head coach. During the auction, RCB acquired several key players, including Wanindu Hasaranga, Harshal Patel, Finn Allen, Mahipal Lomror, Dinesh Karthik, Josh Hazlewood, and Jason Behrendorff. The season also saw the expansion of the league to include two new teams, making it a 10-team competition. RCB managed to advance past the eliminator stage for the first time in two seasons but ultimately fell short of winning the title, losing to Rajasthan Royals in Qualifier 2. du Plessis finished the season as the team's highest run-scorer with 468 runs, while Hasaranga was the leading wicket-taker with 26 wickets.

Ahead of the 2023 season, RCB acquired Reece Topley, Will Jacks, Rajan Kumar, Avinash Singh, Sonu Yadav, Himanshu Sharma, and Manoj Bhadange in the auction. The team won seven of their fourteen matches, finishing sixth in the group stage and failing to qualify for the playoffs. Faf du Plessis was the top run-scorer, while Mohammed Siraj took the most wickets for the team.

=== 2024–present: Maiden and back-to-back IPL Titles ===
In the 2024 season, the Royal Challengers struggled in the first half, losing 7 of their 8 games. But they made a massive turnaround and managed to qualify for the playoffs by winning their next six matches. In the eliminator against Rajasthan Royals, RCB lost the match by four wickets. Virat Kohli won the Orange Cap, scoring 741 runs, while Yash Dayal became the team's highest wicket-taker with 15 wickets.

On 3 June 2025, at the Narendra Modi Stadium in Ahmedabad, Royal Challengers Bengaluru (RCB) won their first-ever Indian Premier League (IPL) title by defeating Punjab Kings by six runs. Batting first, RCB scored 190 for 9 in their 20 overs, with Virat Kohli top-scoring with 43 runs from 35 balls. In reply, Punjab Kings managed 184 for 7, with Shashank Singh remaining not out on 61 runs.

RCB's bowlers played a crucial role in defending the total. Krunal Pandya took 2 wickets for 17 runs, and Bhuvneshwar Kumar claimed 2 for 38, helping RCB control the game in the final overs.

This win ended an 18-year wait for the franchise, which had previously finished as runners-up in 2009, 2011, and 2016. The title was a major milestone for Virat Kohli, who had been with the team since its founding in 2008, and was widely celebrated by fans and cricket enthusiasts across the country.

RCB entered the 2026 season as the defending champions and retained majority of their title winning squad from the last year in the mini auction.

They won 9 league matches and topped the league table for the second time in their history. They went onto beat Gujarat Titans in both the Qualifier 1 and Final to retain their title. In doing so, they become only the third team to win back-to-back IPL trophies.

== Ownership history ==
=== Inception and Diageo era (2008–2026) ===
The franchise was established in 2008 when Vijay Mallya, through United Breweries Group, purchased the Bangalore-based team for $111.6 million (approx. ₹446 crore). At the time, it was the second-most expensive franchise in the inaugural Indian Premier League season, trailing only the Mumbai Indians.

The first major ownership transition occurred between 2013 and 2016. In July 2013, British multinational Diageo acquired a controlling interest in United Spirits Limited (USL). Following Mallya's resignation as Chairman of USL in February 2016, Diageo assumed full operational and management control. In 2023, the franchise expanded by acquiring the RCB Women's team in the WPL for ₹901 crore ($110 million).

=== Consortium acquisition and record valuation (2026–present) ===
In March 2026, United Spirits finalised the sale of 100% equity in Royal Challengers Sports Private Limited to a four-member consortium for approximately $1.78 billion (₹16,660 crore).

The transaction was a comprehensive acquisition that included:

- The Royal Challengers Bengaluru men's team.
- The Royal Challengers Bengaluru women's team.
- All associated brand intellectual property, the RCB Bar & Cafe hospitality ventures, and the RCB Unbox intellectual properties.

Upon completion, this deal was recognised as the highest valuation ever paid for a cricket franchise, surpassing the previous record of $1.63 billion set earlier in 2026 by the sale of the Rajasthan Royals to a group led by Kal Somani and Rob Walton.

The new ownership consists of:

- Aditya Birla Group: Led by chairman Aryaman Vikram Birla, owned by the Birla family.
- The Times Group: Owned by the Sahu Jain family, via Bennett, Coleman & Co.
- Bolt Ventures: Owned by David Blitzer, co-founder of Harris Blitzer Sports & Entertainment.
- Blackstone: An investment firm represented by Viral Patel, CEO of BXPE.

The deal received formal ratification from the Board of Control for Cricket in India (BCCI) on 25 March 2026.

== Team identity ==
=== Naming ===
Vijay Mallya wanted to associate one of his top-selling liquor brands, either McDowell's No.1 or Royal Challenge with the team.

=== Logo ===
The logo initially consisted of the RC emblem in yellow on a circular red base. The RC crown emblem with the roaring lion placed on the top of the logo was derived from the original Royal Challenge logo. No significant changes took place in the design of the logo except for the replacement of colour yellow with gold from 2009. This logo also had a dotted white circle around the RC emblem. The team also uses an alternate logo for the Game for Green matches where the green plants surround the logo and the text Game for Green is placed below the logo. The logo was redesigned in 2016 with the inclusion of black as a secondary colour. The lion in the crest was enlarged and the shield removed.

In 2020, a new logo was unveiled featuring a bigger lion and the crown returning from the previous logo. The RC emblem was omitted for this crest. In 2024, the logo changed again after Royal Challengers Bangalore was renamed to Royal Challengers Bengaluru.

=== Kit evolution ===
==== Regular kits ====
The official colours of RCB are red, black and gold. In 2024, a bold blue color was included in the jersey but was not continued later.

2016–2021

2022–2023

2024

2025–present

==== Go green kits ====
Since 2011, RCB has a tradition of replacing the red with green for the #GameForGreen matches once every season. In 2021, as a tribute to the COVID-19 frontline workers, RCB played a match with sky-blue kits, the colour of PPE kits of frontline workers.

Meanwhile, the annual green kits are made of recycled material, supporting the team's cause of going carbon neutral and raising awareness to plant more trees.

2016–2021

2022–2023

2024

2025–present

=== Kit suppliers and shirt sponsors ===
Reebok manufactured kits for the team from 2008 to 2014 while Adidas supplied the kits in 2015. Zeven was the manufacturer from 2016 to 2019. Wrogn manufactured the kits in 2020 while Puma became the official kit manufacturer since 2021.

Period	Kit supplier	Front sponsor	Back sponsor
2008–2011	Reebok	Royal Challenge	McDowell's No.1
2011–2014	Reebok	McDowell's No.1	Royal Challenge
2014–2015	Reebok	Huawei	Kingfisher
2015–2016	Adidas	Huawei	Kingfisher
2016–2017	Zeven	Hero Cycles	Kingfisher
2017–2018	Zeven	Gionee	Kingfisher
2018–2019	Zeven	Eros Now	Duraguard Cement
2019–2020	Zeven	Wrogn	Pillsbury Cookie Cake
2020–2021	Wrogn	Muthoot Fincorp	DP World
2021–2023	Puma	Muthoot Fincorp	DP World
2023–2026	Puma	Qatar Airways	KEI
2026–present	Puma	Nothing	BKT

=== Rivalries ===
==== Kolkata Knight Riders ====
The rivalry between Kolkata Knight Riders and Royal Challengers Bangalore is one of the oldest in the IPL. The inaugural match of IPL was played between both the teams in which KKR won by 140 runs due to a 158* off just 73 balls by Brendon McCullum.

In the IPL 2009, RCB won in both encounters against Knight Riders. During the second time they faced each other, Ross Taylor played a notable innings, scoring 81* runs off 33 balls, contributing significantly to RCB's victory by six wickets.

In the 2012 edition of IPL, KKR was at the lower half of the IPL table and needed to win the crucial match against RCB. KKR won the toss and chose to bat first. Then KKR Skipper Gautam Gambhir led from the front with 93 (51). In reply, RCB lost wickets at regular intervals, as only Chris Gayle managed to put up a fight with a score of 86 (58). The next time they met, Gambhir again was the thorn in RCB's team as he top scored for KKR at a tough pitch, taking KKR to a competitive total of 165. RCB in reply made 129, as Lakshmipathy Balaji ripped through their line-up with a 4/18 in 4 overs.

In the 2015 IPL edition, RCB and KKR took part in a match reduced due to rain. It was reduced to a 10-over match. RCB won the toss and elected to field. For KKR, Andre Russell was the top scorer as he scored 45 off just 17 balls. He took them to a score of 111/4 in just 10 overs. Mitchell Starc took one wicket for 15 runs in 2 overs. In reply, RCB were at 0–48 at 3.4 overs before Brad Hogg got Chris Gayle out. After that, RCB stuttered and started to collapse as they were reduced to 3–81 in 7.2 overs. When Virat Kohli got out to Andre Russell, the match looked to be over for RCB. However, Mandeep Singh scored 45 off just 18 balls, hitting 3 sixes and 4 fours.

In the 2017 IPL edition, Kolkata Knight Riders and Royal Challengers Bangalore again faced each other twice. In the first match between them, RCB got KKR out for a score of 131 after KKR had made a strong start of 0–48 in 3.3 overs. However, KKR dismissed RCB for 49, the lowest team score in the history of IPL. Nathan Coulter Nile, Colin de Grandhomme and Chris Woakes got three wickets each. In the next match, Sunil Narine scored what was then the fastest fifty in IPL (50 off 15 balls – which is now the second-fastest). KKR made the highest score made in powerplay in any IPL match, and easily chased down the target offered by RCB.

The 2019 IPL saw Virat Kohli scoring 84 off 49 and AB de Villiers scoring 63 off 32, taking RCB to a total of 205/3. KKR had a strong start, scoring 28/0 in 1.3 overs before losing wickets at regular intervals and having their run rate reduced. They were 139/4 in 15.5 overs. However, Dinesh Karthik and Andre Russell brought back the chase under control. Karthik got out after scoring 19 off 15, leaving KKR at 153/5 in 17 overs. Andre Russell, however, took KKR over the line as he scored 48 off 13, hitting Mohammed Siraj for 23 runs in one over.

In the next match, RCB struck back as Virat Kohli made his 5th IPL century, scoring 100 runs in 58 balls only. Moeen Ali scored 66 runs in only 28 balls as RCB scored 213 runs. For KKR, Nitish Rana scored 85 off 46 and Andre Russell scored 65 off 25, taking the game down to the wire. However, RCB won the match by 10 runs, with Virat Kohli being Man of the Match.

==== Chennai Super Kings ====
RCB's rivalry with Chennai Super Kings is dubbed the "Southern Derby." The Super Kings beat the Royal Challengers in the final of the 2011 IPL, the only meeting between the two teams at an IPL final.

CSK held an upper hand over RCB in the subsequent seasons from 2012 to 2023, winning 14 out of the 20 encounters, including in 2015, when CSK defeated RCB thrice in a single season.

The 2024 and 2025 seasons saw the tide turn in RCB's favour. In 2024, RCB knocked CSK out of the IPL by winning their last game of the season, which was also considered a virtual quarter final as the winner of the game would have made it to the qualifiers. RCB required a hefty win to surpass CSK's net run rate and qualify for the playoffs in the 4th spot. It came down to wire at the Chinnaswamy where RCB were required to defend 35 runs in the last over to win, but more importantly not give away more than 16 runs to ensure qualification. Yash Dayal's last over saw RCB give away just 7 runs to win the match and qualify.

In the 2025, for the first time, saw RCB win all of their games against CSK in a season while also win at Chepauk, CSK's home, after 17 years. The last game at Chinnaswamy saw a repeat of the event of the previous season's game. Dayal defended 16 runs in the last over once moe to ensure RCB's win.

RCB's win streak against CSK continued in 2026. In their latest clash, batting first, RCB scored 250/3, fuelled by Tim David's explosive knock of 70 off 25. That was the highest total of the season at the time, and their highest total against CSK. In the end, they won by 43 runs.

As of April 2026, in the 36 matches played between the Royal Challengers & Super Kings, the Super Kings have won 21 to the Royal Challengers' 14, with one match ending in a draw.

==== Deccan Chargers and Sunrisers Hyderabad ====
Another notable rivalry involving RCB is with the Hyderabad franchises, first with the now defunct Deccan Chargers and with the Sunrisers Hyderabad. The Deccan Chargers won six out of the 11 clashes between the two and the Sunrisers currently lead with 14 games to 12. The Sunrisers have also played a key role in derailing the Royal Challengers' campaigns. In the 2009 and 2016 seasons, they were beaten in the finals by Chargers and Sunrisers respectively. In the 2020 season, Sunrisers knocked RCB out of the tournament in the eliminator. In the 2021 season, Sunrisers, who did not qualify for the playoffs, were able to beat RCB, causing them to finish in 3rd place and forcing them to play the eliminator, which they lost to KKR. Their 2022 IPL campaign was also deailed by SRH, whom they lost to by 9 wickets after scoring 68 in their first encounter, putting them under pressure because of their negative run rate through their otherwise strong campaign.

In the latest chapter of the rivalry between the two in IPL 2024, like the Kolkata Knight Riders, Sunrisers Hyderabad were the first to break the 263-run record set by RCB, which seemed insurmountable at the time as a result of Chris Gayle's 175. In a more humiliating turn, SRH again broke RCB's record against RCB themselves on their home ground, scoring 287 runs, thanks to a 39-ball century by Travis Head and a 30-ball 67 by Heinrich Klassen. Although there was a valiant effort by RCB, spearheaded by Dinesh Karthik's 83 off 35 and captain Faf du Plessis's 62 off 28, RCB still lost by 25 runs. SRH would break RCB's 263 record for the third time and score 266 against the Delhi Capitals after setting an all-time T20 record by scoring 125 runs inside the power-play.

=== Ambassadors ===
Katrina Kaif was the brand ambassador for the team in 2008. Deepika Padukone, Ramya, Puneeth Rajkumar, Shiva Rajkumar, Upendra and Ganesh have been the ambassadors for the team in the later seasons.

=== Fan support ===
The Royal Challengers has a large and passionate fan base in India and especially in the city of Bengaluru. Their fans are known to be loyal and vocal in their support. They turn up in large numbers for RCB's home matches, turning the stadium into what is called a sea of red. They are well known for their chants of "R-C-B, R-C-B" and "Ee Sala Cup Namde" (transl. This time the cup is ours). The stadium organisers also provide the home team fans with cheer kits, RCB flags and noisemakers. Royal Challengers Bengaluru is also the most followed cricket franchise on Instagram with more than 21 million followers.

During the 2014 IPL, the Royal Challengers became the first team to provide free Wi-Fi connectivity to fans at their home ground. 50 access points were set up using fibre-optic cables to provide the connectivity to fans on match days at the Chinnaswamy.

==== Ee Sala Cup Namde ====
Ee Sala Cup Namde (Kannada: ಈ ಸಲ ಕಪ್ ನಮ್ದೇ; transl. This year, the cup will be ours) is a popular Kannada-language sports chant. It became widely used by fans of the RCB as a rallying cry for their hopes of winning the Indian Premier League (IPL). The phrase is often paired with its triumphant variant, Ee Sala Cup Namdu (transl. This year, the cup is ours), particularly after their maiden IPL title in 2025.

The chant first gained traction around 2016–17 on Kannada social media and meme platforms, where fans used it humorously and aspirationally in anticipation of RCB finally winning an IPL title. Its use intensified as RCB reached finals and crucial knockout matches, becoming a ubiquitous refrain in Bengaluru home stadium and fan gatherings. The slogan's meaning is deeply rooted in Kannada identity, with the word-for-word translation being "this time the cup will be ours". After RCB's historic victory over Punjab Kings in the IPL 2025 final, the chant proudly evolved to "Ee Sala Cup Namdu", emphasizing possession rather than hope.

In popular culture, the chant transcended cricket. In 2018, lyricist Pradyumna Narahalli wrote a fan anthem titled "Ee Sala Cup Namde", performed by Sangeetha Rajeev, which captured the collective sentiment of RCB supporters. Multiple Kannada YouTube channels and local news outlets featured the chant and its celebratory use after RCB's 2025 triumph.

== Squad ==
Squad for the 2027 season
No.	Name	Nationality	Birth date	Batting style	Bowling style	Year signed	Salary	Notes
Captain
97	**Rajat Patidar**	India	1 June 1993 (age 33)	Right-handed	Right-arm off-break	2022	₹11 crore (US$1.2 million)	Captain
Batters
18	**Virat Kohli**	India	5 November 1988 (age 38)	Right-handed	Right-arm medium	2008	₹21 crore (US$2.2 million)	
37	**Devdutt Padikkal**	India	7 July 2000 (age 26)	Left-handed	Right-arm off-break	2025	₹2 crore (US$210,000)	
Wicket-keepers
28	**Phil Salt**	England	28 August 1996 (age 30)	Right-handed	—N/a	2025	₹11.5 crore (US$1.2 million)	Overseas
55	**Jitesh Sharma**	India	22 October 1993 (age 33)	Right-handed	—N/a	2025	₹11 crore (US$1.2 million)	Vice-Captain
22	**Jordan Cox**	England	21 October 2000 (age 26)	Right-handed	—N/a	2025	₹75 lakh (US$80,000)	Overseas
All-rounders
25	**Krunal Pandya**	India	24 March 1991 (age 35)	Left-handed	Left-arm orthodox	2025	₹5.75 crore (US$610,000)	
8	**Tim David**	Australia	16 March 1996 (age 30)	Right-handed	Right-arm off-break	2025	₹3 crore (US$320,000)	Overseas
	Kanishk Chouhan	India	26 September 2006 (age 20)	Right-handed	Right-arm off-break	2026	₹30 lakh (US$32,000)	
16	**Romario Shepherd**	West Indies	26 November 1994 (age 31)	Right-handed	Right-arm fast-medium	2025	₹1.5 crore (US$160,000)	Overseas
24	Swapnil Singh	India	22 January 1991 (age 35)	Right-handed	Left-arm orthodox	2024	₹50 lakh (US$53,000)	
25	**Venkatesh Iyer**	India	25 December 1994 (age 31)	Left-handed	Right-arm medium	2026	₹7 crore (US$750,000)	
Pace bowlers
38	**Josh Hazlewood**	Australia	8 January 1991 (age 35)	Right-handed	Right-arm fast-medium	2025	₹12.5 crore (US$1.3 million)	Overseas
15	**Bhuvneshwar Kumar**	India	5 February 1990 (age 36)	Right-handed	Right-arm medium	2025	₹10.75 crore (US$1.1 million)	
42	Rasikh Salam	India	5 April 2000 (age 26)	Right-handed	Right-arm fast-medium	2025	₹6 crore (US$640,000)	
103	Yash Dayal	India	13 December 1997 (age 28)	Right-handed	Left-arm fast-medium	2024	₹5 crore (US$530,000)	
53	**Nuwan Thushara**	Sri Lanka	6 August 1994 (age 32)	Right-handed	Right-arm medium-fast	2025	₹1.6 crore (US$170,000)	Overseas
	**Jacob Duffy**	New Zealand	2 August 1994 (age 32)	Right-handed	Right-arm fast-medium	2026	₹2 crore (US$210,000)	Overseas
14	Abhinandan Singh	India	30 March 1997 (age 29)	Right-handed	Right-arm fast-medium	2025	₹30 lakh (US$32,000)	
Spin bowlers
12	Suyash Sharma	India	15 May 2003 (age 23)	Right-handed	Right-arm leg-break	2025	₹2.6 crore (US$280,000)	
	Vicky Ostwal	India	1 September 2002 (age 24)	Right-handed	Left-arm orthodox	2026	₹30 lakh (US$32,000)	
Source: [https://www.royalchallengers.com/rcb-squad-men

Players with international caps are in bold.

== Administration and support staff ==
Position	Name
Team manager	Shaminder Singh Sidhu
Team director	Mo Bobat
Head coach	Andy Flower
Mentor and batting coach	Dinesh Karthik
Spin bowling coach Player identification manager	Malolan Rangarajan
Fast bowling coach	Omkar Salvi
Fielding coach	Richard Halsall
Analytical coach	Freddie Wilde
Head physiotherapist	Evan Speechly
Strength and conditioning coach	Basu Shanker
Source: RCB Staff

== Performance record ==
=== Indian Premier League ===
Year	Matches	Won	Lost	No Result	League Standing	Final Position	Most Runs	Most Wickets
2008	14	4	10	0	7/8	League Stage	Rahul Dravid	Zaheer Khan
2009	16	9	7	0	3/8	Runners Up	Jacques Kallis	Anil Kumble
2010	16	8	8	0	4/8	Third Place	Jacques Kallis	Anil Kumble
2011	17	10	6	1	1/10	Runners Up	Chris Gayle	Sreenath Aravind
2012	16	8	7	1	5/9	League Stage	Chris Gayle	Vinay Kumar
2013	16	9	7	0	5/9	League Stage	Chris Gayle	Vinay Kumar
2014	14	5	9	0	7/8	League Stage	AB de Villiers	Varun Aaron
2015	16	8	6	2	3/8	Third Place	AB de Villiers	Yuzvendra Chahal
2016	16	9	7	0	2/8	Runners Up	Virat Kohli	Yuzvendra Chahal
2017	14	3	10	1	8/8	League Stage	Virat Kohli	Pawan Negi
2018	14	6	8	0	6/8	League Stage	Virat Kohli	Umesh Yadav
2019	14	5	8	1	8/8	League Stage	Virat Kohli	Yuzvendra Chahal
2020	15	7	8	0	4/8	Playoffs	Devdutt Padikkal	Yuzvendra Chahal
2021	15	9	6	0	3/8	Playoffs	Glenn Maxwell	Harshal Patel
2022	16	9	7	0	4/10	Third Place	Faf du Plessis	Wanindu Hasaranga
2023	14	7	7	0	6/10	League Stage	Faf du Plessis	Mohammed Siraj
2024	15	7	8	0	4/10	Playoffs	Virat Kohli	Yash Dayal
2025	16	11	4	1	2/10	Champions	Virat Kohli	Josh Hazlewood
2026	16	11	5	0	1/10	Champions	Virat Kohli	Bhuvneshwar Kumar
Total	290	145	138	7	Champions x2 Runners Up x 3 Playoffs x 11		Virat Kohli	Yuzvendra Chahal

=== Champions League ===
Year	League Standing	Final Position	Most Runs	Most Wickets
2009	5/12	League Stage	Ross Taylor	Anil Kumble
2010	4/10	Semi Finals	Rahul Dravid	Vinay Kumar
2011	2/13	Runners Up	Chris Gayle	Daniel Vettori
Total	Runners Up x 1		Virat Kohli	Vinay Kumar

=== By opposition ===
As of 2026 edition

Indian Premier League
Opposition	Seasons	Matches	Won	Lost	Tied	NR	Success Rate
Chennai Super Kings	2008–2026	36	14	21	0	1	38.88%
Delhi Capitals	2008–2026	35	21	13	0	1	60%
Gujarat Titans	2008–2026	10	6	4	0	0	60.00%
Kolkata Knight Riders	2008–2026	37	16	20	0	1	43.24%
Lucknow Super Giants	2008–2026	8	5	3	0	0	62.50%
Mumbai Indians	2008–2026	36	17	19	0	0	47.22%
Punjab Kings	2008–2026	38	20	18	0	0	52.63%
Rajasthan Royals	2008–2026	35	17	15	0	3	48.57%
Sunrisers Hyderabad	2013–2026	28	12	15	0	1	42.86%
Deccan Chargers	2008–2012	11	5	6	0	0	45.45%
Kochi Tuskers Kerala	2011–2011	2	2	0	0	0	100%
Pune Warriors India	2011–2013	5	5	0	0	0	100%
Gujarat Lions	2016–2017	5	3	2	0	0	60%
Rising Pune Supergiant	2016–2017	4	2	2	0	0	50%
Total	2008–2026	290	145	138	0	7	50.00%

As of 2011 edition

Champions League
Opposition	Seasons	Matches	Won	Lost	Tied	NR	Success Rate
Cape Cobras	2009	1	0	1	0	0	0%
Chennai Super Kings	2010	1	0	1	0	0	0%
Delhi Capitals	2009	1	1	0	0	0	100%
Guyana	2010	1	1	0	0	0	100%
Highveld Lions	2010	1	1	0	0	0	100%
Kolkata Knight Riders	2011	1	0	1	0	0	0%
Mumbai Indians	2010–2011	2	0	2	0	0	0%
New South Wales Blues	2011	1	1	0	0	0	100%
Otago Volts	2009	1	1	0	0	0	100%
Somerset	2011	1	1	0	0	0	100%
Southern Redbacks	2010–2011	2	1	1	0	0	50%
Victorian Bushrangers	2009	1	0	1	0	0	0%
Warriors	2011	1	0	1	0	0	0%
Total	2009–2011	15	7	8	0	0	46.67%

Defunct teams
Non IPL Teams

=== Captaincy record ===
As of May 2026

Player	Duration	Matches	Won	Lost	Tied	Win%	Best Result
Rahul Dravid	2008	14	4	10	0	28.57	
Kevin Pietersen (Note: Captain for first half of the 2009 season)	2009	6	2	4	0	33.33	
Anil Kumble	2009–2010	35	19	16	0	54.28	Runners Up (2009)
Daniel Vettori	2011–2012	28	15	13	0	53.57	Runners Up (2011)
Virat Kohli	2013–2021 (Note: Interim during 2023)	143	66	70	3	46.15	Runners Up (2016)
Shane Watson (Note: Stand-in)	2017	3	1	2	0	33.33	
Faf du Plessis	2022–2024	42	21	21	0	50.00	Third (2022)
Rajat Patidar	2025–present	28	20	8	0	71.42	Champions (2025, 2026)
Jitesh Sharma (Note: Stand-in)	2025–2026	3	2	1	0	66.67	

== Statistics ==
=== Most runs ===
#	Player	Runs	Innings	Duration
1	Virat Kohli	9336	275	2008–present
2	AB de Villiers	4522	145	2011–2021
3	Chris Gayle	3420	90	2011–2017
4	Faf du Plessis	1636	45	2022–2024
5	Rajat Patidar	1597	51	2021–present

=== Most wickets ===
#	Player	Wickets	Innings	Duration
1	Yuzvendra Chahal	139	112	2014–2021
2	Harshal Patel	99	77	2012–2023
3	Mohammed Siraj	83	87	2018–2024
4	Vinay Kumar	72	63	2008–2013
5	Josh Hazlewood	60	40	2022–Present

=== Most catches ===
#	Player	Catches	Innings	Duration
1	Virat Kohli	126	280	2008–present
2	AB de Villiers	70	104	2011–2021
3	Devdutt Padikkal	28	54	2020–Present
3	Mohammed Siraj	28	87	2018–2024
5	Yuzvendra Chahal	24	112	2014–2021

=== Most dismissals ===
#	Player	Dismissals	Innings	Duration
1	Dinesh Karthik	45	54	2015–2024
2	Jitesh Sharma	37	32	2025–present
3	AB de Villiers	34	50	2011–2021
4	Parthiv Patel	23	32	2014–2019
5	Mark Boucher	16	26	2008–2010

=== Indian Premier League ===
Year	Award	Recipient	Ref
2008	Emerging Player	Shreevats Goswami	
2009	Player of the Final	Anil Kumble	
2010	Most Sixes	Robin Uthappa	
2011	Orange Cap	Chris Gayle	
2011	Most Sixes	Chris Gayle	
2011	Most Valuable Player	Chris Gayle	
2012	Orange Cap	Chris Gayle	
2012	Most Sixes	Chris Gayle	
2013	Most Sixes	Chris Gayle	
2015	Most Sixes	Chris Gayle	
2016	Orange Cap	Virat Kohli	
2016	Most Sixes	Virat Kohli	
2016	Most Valuable Player	Virat Kohli	
2020	Emerging Player	Devdutt Padikkal	
2021	Purple Cap	Harshal Patel	
2021	Most Valuable Player	Harshal Patel	
2022	Highest Strike Rate	Dinesh Karthik	
2023	Most Sixes	Faf du Plessis	
2023	Highest Strike Rate	Glenn Maxwell	
2024	Orange Cap	Virat Kohli	
2025	Player of the Final	Krunal Pandya	
2026	Player of the Final	Virat Kohli	

=== Others ===
Year	Award	Category	Ref
2023	CII Sports Business Awards	Sports Franchise of the Year	

=== Tournament records ===
Batting
Most runs	Virat Kohli	9336
Most fours	Virat Kohli	844
Most sixes	Virat Kohli	316
Most centuries	Virat Kohli	9
Most half-centuries	Virat Kohli	68
Most runs in a season	Virat Kohli	973 (2016)
Best strike rate	Tim David	185.33
Fastest century	Chris Gayle	30 balls vs Pune Warriors (2013)
Highest score	Chris Gayle	175* vs Pune Warriors (2013)
Highest partnership	Virat Kohli AB de Villiers	229 vs Gujarat Lions (2016)
Bowling
Most wickets in a season	Harshal Patel	32 (2021)
Best economy	Daniel Vettori	6.56
Most dots	Bhuvneshwar Kumar	1876
Best bowling average (Note: Minimum 25 Matches and 50 overs Bowled)	Mitchell Starc	20.38
Fielding
Most catches	Virat Kohli	127

== Hall of Fame ==
Year	Player	Performance	Duration	Ref
2022	AB de Villiers	4491 runs in 144 innings	2011–2021	
2022	Chris Gayle	3163 runs in 84 innings	2011–2017	
2024	Vinay Kumar	72 wickets in 63 innings	2008–2013	

== See also ==
- 2026 Royal Challengers Bengaluru season – Indian Premier League cricket team
- Royal Challengers Bengaluru (WPL team)
