= Luvnith Sisodia =

Indian cricketer (born 2000)

Personal information
- Full name: Luvnith Sujith Sisodia
- Born: 15 January 2000 (age 26); Bangalore, Karnataka, India
- Batting: Left-handed
- Bowling: Left-arm medium
- Role: Wicket-keeper

Domestic team information
- Years: Team
- 2018/19–2022/23: Karnataka

Career statistics
Competition	Twenty20
Matches	15
Runs scored	124
Batting average	13.77
100s/50s	0/0
Top score	38
Catches/stumpings	8/5
- Source: ESPNcricinfo, 22 March 2025

Luvnith Sisodia (born 15 January 2000) is an Indian cricketer. He made his Twenty20 debut for Karnataka in the 2018–19 Syed Mushtaq Ali Trophy on 25 February 2019. In February 2022, he was bought by the Royal Challengers Bangalore in the auction for the 2022 Indian Premier League tournament.

He has been bought by Kolkata Knight Riders in the 2025 Ipl auction for 30 lakhs.
