= Richard Halsall =

Zimbabwean cricketer

Personal information
- Full name: Richard Grant Halsall
- Born: 1 October 1968 (age 58); Salisbury, Rhodesia
- Batting: Right-handed
- Bowling: Right-arm fast-medium

Domestic team information
- Years: Team
- 1993/94: Mashonaland Country Districts
- 1999: Cambridge University
- 2000–2001: Sussex Cricket Board

Career statistics
Competition	First-class	List A
Matches	8	5
Runs scored	171	36
Batting average	19.00	18.00
100s/50s	0/1	0/0
Top score	76	17
Balls bowled	1,236	126
Wickets	13	5
Bowling average	44.38	20.60
5 wickets in innings	0	0
10 wickets in match	0	0
Best bowling	3/64	4/34
Catches/stumpings	5/–	0/–
- Source: Cricinfo, 23 October 2010

Richard Grant Halsall (born 1 October 1968) is a Zimbabwean cricket coach and former cricketer. A right-handed batsman who bowled right-arm fast-medium, he was born at Salisbury, Rhodesia (today Harare, Zimbabwe).

Halsall made his debut in first-class cricket for Mashonaland Country Districts against Mashonaland Under-24s in the 1993/94 Logan Cup. This was the only first-class match he played in Zimbabwe.

His next appearance in first-class cricket came for Cambridge University in English county cricket. His first-class debut for the university came against Lancashire in 1999. During the 1999 season, he represented the university in 7 first-class matches, the last of which came against Oxford University. In his combined total of 8 first-class matches, he scored 171 runs at a batting average of 19.00, with a single half century high score of 76. In the field he took 5 catches. With the ball he took 13 wickets at a bowling average of 44.38, with best figures of 3/64.

Halsall later represented the Sussex Cricket Board in List A cricket. His debut List A match came against Herefordshire in the 2000 NatWest Trophy. From 2000 to 2001, he represented the Board in 5 List A matches, the last of which came against the Essex Cricket Board in 1st round of the 2002 Cheltenham & Gloucester Trophy which was held in 2001. In his 5 List A matches, he scored 36 runs at an average of 18.00, with a high score of 17. With the ball he took 5 wickets at an average of 20.60, with best figures of 4/34.

== Coaching career ==
After a spell coaching at Sussex, Halsall was in 2007 appointed as the first full-time fielding coach of the England cricket team, After his contract expired on 3 October with the ECB, he joined as the fielding coach of the Bangladesh national cricket team for the next two years. Having worked with Andy Flower as fielding coach of Multan Sultans in PSL, he was subsequently appointed as fielding coach of Lucknow Super Giants for IPL 2022.
