= Manoj Bhandage =

Indian cricketer (born 1998)

Personal information
- Full name: Manoj Shivaramsa Bhandage
- Born: 5 October 1998 (age 28); Raichur, Karnataka, India
- Batting: Left-handed
- Bowling: Right-arm medium-fast
- Role: All-rounder

Domestic team information
- Years: Team
- 2018–present: Karnataka
- 2025: Royal Challengers Bangalore

Career statistics
Competition	LA	T20
Matches	14	28
Runs scored	235	187
Batting average	26.11	15.58
100s/50s	0/1	0/0
Top score	63	41
Balls bowled	462	300
Wickets	10	18
Bowling average	37.00	24.05
5 wickets in innings	0	0
10 wickets in match	0	0
Best bowling	2/19	3/19
Catches/stumpings	3/–	7/–
- Source: ESPNcricinfo, 20 March 2025

Manoj Bhandage (born 5 October 1998) is an Indian cricketer. He made his Twenty20 debut for Karnataka in the 2018–19 Syed Mushtaq Ali Trophy on 21 February 2019.
