= Saiyed Khalid =

Indian cricketer (born 1975)

Personal information
- Full name: Hussain Azizhak Saiyed Khalid
- Born: 21 October 1975 (age 51); Baroda, Gujarat, India
- Batting: Right-handed
- Bowling: Slow left-arm orthodox

Domestic team information
- Years: Team
- 1996–2003: Goa
- FC debut: 25 October 1996 Goa v Karnataka
- Last FC: 28 December 2002 Goa v Services
- LA debut: 24 October 1996 Goa v Karnataka
- Last LA: 11 December 2002 Goa v Karnataka

Umpiring information
- WODIs umpired: 5 (2015–2019)
- WT20Is umpired: 5 (2018–2023)
- FC umpired: 21 (2008–2015)
- LA umpired: 10 (2008–2014)
- T20 umpired: 5 (2015–2015)

Career statistics
Competition	First-class	List A
Matches	27	23
Runs scored	369	69
Batting average	9.46	8.62
100s/50s	0/0	0/0
Top score	26	18
Balls bowled	5,196	917
Wickets	62	23
Bowling average	36.95	34.30
5 wickets in innings	2	0
10 wickets in match	0	0
Best bowling	5/54	3/25
Catches/stumpings	16/–	1/–
- Source: CricketArchive, 30 November 2015

Saiyed Khalid (born 21 October 1975) is an Indian former first-class cricketer. He is now an umpire and stood in matches in the 2015–16 Ranji Trophy.
