= Rajat Patidar =

Indian cricketer (born 1993)

Personal information
- Born: 1 June 1993 (age 33); Indore, Madhya Pradesh, India
- Batting: Right-handed
- Bowling: Right-arm off break
- Role: Top-order batter

International information
- National side: India (2023–present)
- Test debut (cap 310): 2 February 2024 v England
- Last Test: 23 February 2024 v England
- Only ODI (cap 255): 21 December 2023 v South Africa
- ODI shirt no.: 87

Domestic team information
- Years: Team
- 2015–present: Madhya Pradesh
- 2021–present: Royal Challengers Bengaluru

Career statistics
Competition	Test	ODI	FC	LA
Matches	3	1	74	64
Runs scored	63	22	5,448	2,211
Batting average	10.50	22.00	45.78	37.47
100s/50s	0/0	0/0	16/27	4/13
Top score	32	22	205*	158
Catches/stumpings	4/–	–/–	105/–	26/-
- Source: ESPNcricinfo, 20 December 2025

Rajat Manohar Patidar (born 1 June 1993) is an Indian international cricketer. He is a right-handed top order batter and an off-spin bowler. He made his international debut against South Africa in December 2023. Patidar plays for Madhya Pradesh in domestic cricket and captains the Royal Challengers Bengaluru in the Indian Premier League. Under Rajat Patidar's captaincy, RCB won back to back IPL titles in 2025 and 2026.

== Early life ==
Patidar was born on 1 June 1993 in Indore, Madhya Pradesh. His father is a businessman. He joined a cricket club when he was 8 years old and was later enrolled into an academy by his grandfather. He started his career as a bowler and started concentrating on batting after his U-15 levels.

== Domestic career ==
He made his first-class debut on 30 October 2015 in the 2015–16 Ranji Trophy. He made his Twenty20 debut for Madhya Pradesh in the 2017–18 Zonal T20 League on 8 January 2018.

He was the leading run-scorer for Madhya Pradesh in the 2018–19 Ranji Trophy, with 713 runs in eight matches. In August 2019, he was named in the India Blue team's squad for the 2019–20 Duleep Trophy.

In Syed Mushtaq Ali Trophy 2024–25, Rajat Patidar was named the captain for Madhya Pradesh cricket team where he was the 2nd highest run scorer of the tournament scoring 428 runs in 9 innings at an average of 61.14 and a strike rate of 186.08 with 5 half centuries. He also led his team to finals and displayed one-man show performance scoring 81* (40b, 6x4, 6x6).

Rajat Patidar also holds the record of hitting the 5th fastest Century in Ranji Trophy scoring a 100 in just 68 balls against Haryana. His score at the end of this match was 159 (102b, 13x4, 7x6).

== Franchise career ==
In February 2021, Patidar was purchased by Royal Challengers Bangalore in the IPL auction ahead of the 2021 Indian Premier League. He scored 71 runs in four matches during the season and was subsequently released by the franchise.

Patidar went unsold in the 2022 IPL auction but was later signed by Royal Challengers Bangalore as a mid-season replacement. On 25 May 2022, he scored an unbeaten 112 runs against Lucknow Super Giants in the Eliminator of the 2022 Indian Premier League, helping Royal Challengers Bangalore secure victory. The innings was notable for making him the first uncapped player to score a century in an IPL playoff match. His 49-ball century was also the joint-fastest century recorded in the playoff stage of the tournament. He finished the season with 333 runs in eight matches at an average of 55.50.

Patidar was retained by Royal Challengers Bangalore ahead of the 2023 Indian Premier League, but missed the entire season owing to an Achilles tendon injury.

In the 2024 Indian Premier League, Patidar scored 395 runs in 13 innings at an average of 30.38 and a strike rate of 177.13, including five half-centuries.

Ahead of the 2025 Indian Premier League, Patidar was retained by Royal Challengers Bangalore. Following the release of former captain Faf du Plessis, he emerged as a leading candidate for the franchise's captaincy. After Virat Kohli chose to continue solely as a player, Patidar was appointed captain of the franchise for the 2025 season. Under his leadership, Royal Challengers Bangalore won their maiden IPL title in 2025.

Patidar continued as captain in the 2026 Indian Premier League, leading Royal Challengers Bangalore to a second consecutive IPL title. With the victory, he became just the third captain in IPL history (after MS Dhoni and Rohit Sharma) to win the championship in successive seasons. He also had his best individual season to date, scoring 501 runs across 16 matches at a strike rate of 192.36. This included an unbeaten 93* off 33 balls in the Qualifier 1 against the Gujarat Titans.

== International career ==
As a result of a phenomenal domestic season and his performances in 2022 IPL season, Patidar was named in the One-Day International (ODI) squad for the series against South Africa in the month of October. Later in February 2023 he was named in the ODI squad against New Zealand as an injury replacement for Shreyas Iyer. However he failed to make it to the playing eleven on both the occasions.

He made his ODI debut on 21 December 2023 against South Africa, where he scored 22 runs in 16 balls.

In January 2024, he was named as a replacement for Virat Kohli in India's squad for the first two matches of the test series against England. He made his Test debut on 2 February 2024 in the second match of the series, scoring 32 and 9 runs in the first and second innings, respectively.
