= Suyash Prabhudessai =

Indian cricketer (born 1997)

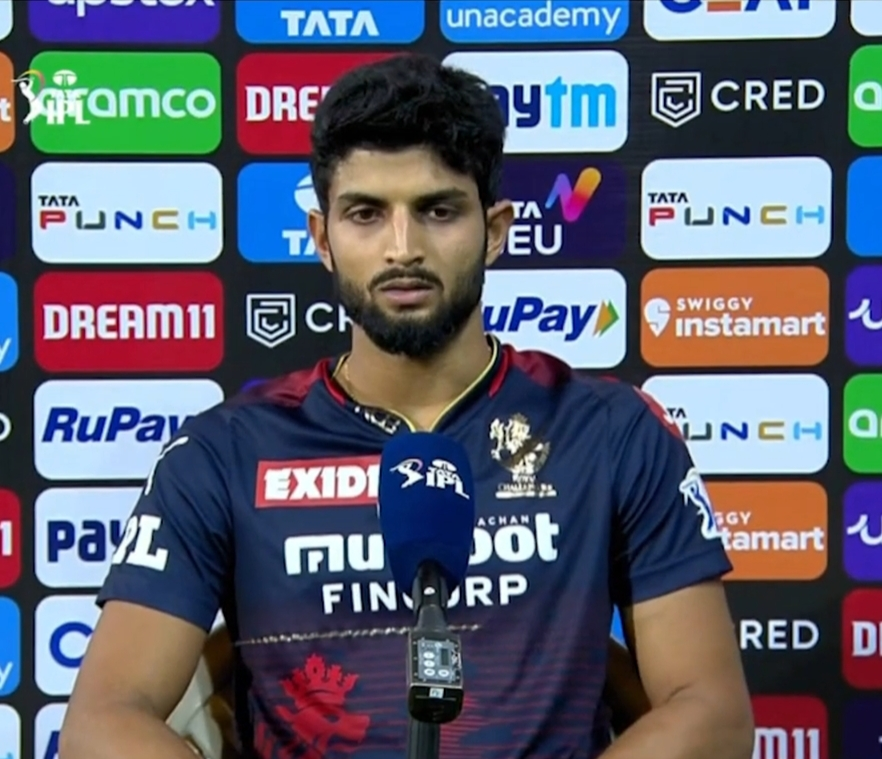
- Prabhudessai at Indian Premier League in 2022

Personal information
- Full name: Suyash S Prabhudessai
- Born: 6 December 1997 (age 28)
- Batting: Right-handed
- Bowling: Right-arm medium
- Role: Batting allrounder

Domestic team information
- Years: Team
- 2016–present: Goa
- 2022–2024: Royal Challengers Bengaluru

Career statistics
Competition	FC	LA	T20
Matches	38	54	53
Runs scored	2,644	1,374	1,167
Batting average	46.38	27.48	31.54
100s/50s	6/15	1/8	0/7
Top score	212	132*	71*
Balls bowled	476	443	154
Wickets	11	8	2
Bowling average	33.54	57.12	95.00
5 wickets in innings	0	0	0
10 wickets in match	0	0	0
Best bowling	2/34	2/33	1/9
Catches/stumpings	39/–	18/–	43/–
- Source: ESPNcricinfo, 1 April 2025

Suyash S Prabhudessai (born 6 December 1997) is an Indian cricketer from Goa who plays for Goa in domestic matches and previously for the Royal Challengers Bengaluru in the IPL.

He made his List A debut for Goa in the 2016–17 Vijay Hazare Trophy on 28 February 2017. He made his first-class debut for Goa in the 2018–19 Ranji Trophy on 20 November 2018. He made his Twenty20 debut for Goa in the 2018–19 Syed Mushtaq Ali Trophy on 22 February 2019.

In February 2021, Prabhudessai was bought by the Royal Challengers Bangalore in the IPL auction ahead of the 2021 Indian Premier League. In February 2022, he was bought by the Royal Challengers Bangalore in the auction for the 2022 Indian Premier League tournament.
