= 2026 Royal Challengers Bengaluru season =

Indian Premier League cricket team

Royal Challengers Bengaluru
2026 season
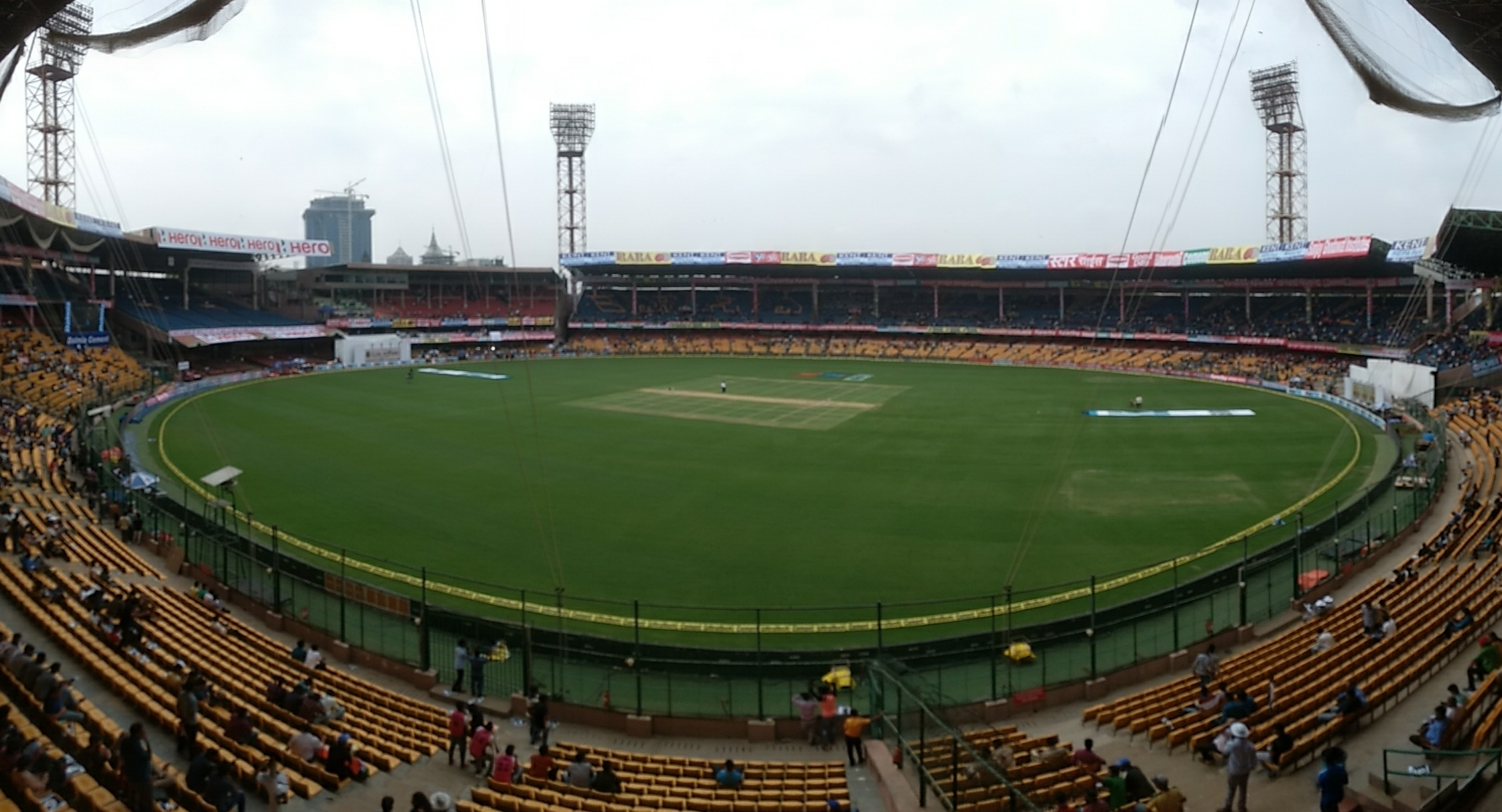
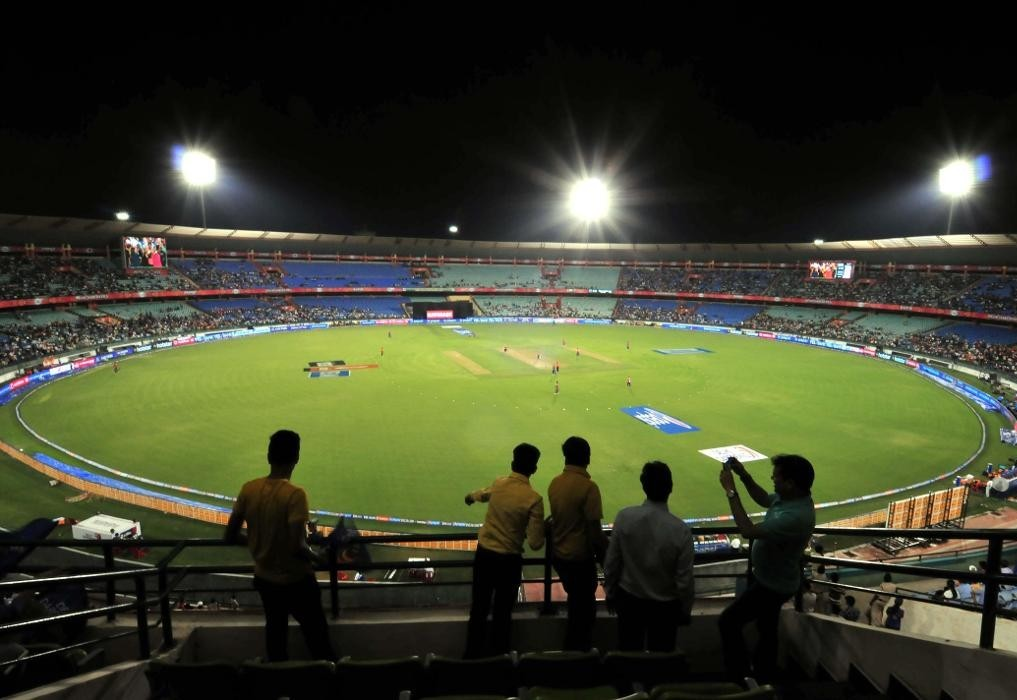
- M. Chinnaswamy Stadium and Shaheed Veer Narayan Singh Stadium, home grounds of Royal Challengers Bengaluru
- Coach: Andy Flower
- Captain: Rajat Patidar
- Ground(s): M. Chinnaswamy Stadium, Bengaluru; Shaheed Veer Narayan Singh Stadium, Raipur
- League stage: 1st place
- Qualifier 1: Won against Gujarat Titans
- Final: Won against Gujarat Titans
- Most runs: Virat Kohli (675)
- Most wickets: Bhuvneshwar Kumar (28)
- Most catches: Devdutt Padikkal (13)
- Most wicket-keeping dismissals: Jitesh Sharma (17)

The 2026 season was Royal Challengers Bengaluru's nineteenth appearance in the Indian Premier League (IPL). They were one of the ten cricket teams that competed in the 2026 IPL. The team was captained by Rajat Patidar and coached by Andy Flower.

Royal Challengers Bengaluru finished in first place in the league stage, and advanced to Qualifier 1 in the playoffs. The team defeated Gujarat Titans in Qualifier 1 to qualify for Bengaluru's fifth final. In the final, they defeated Gujarat Titans again to win their second consecutive title. Royal Challengers Bengaluru also became the first franchise to win the IPL and the Women's Premier League in the same year. Virat Kohli scored the most runs (675) while Bhuvneshwar Kumar took the most wickets (28) for Bengaluru in the 2026 season.

== Pre-season ==
The 2026 Indian Premier League was the 19th edition of the Indian Premier League (IPL), a professional Twenty20 (T20) cricket league held in India, organised by the Board of Control for Cricket in India. Royal Challengers Bengaluru were the defending champions having won their maiden title in the previous season. The tournament featured ten teams competing in 74 matches from 28 March to 31 May 2026. Bengaluru played most their home matches at M. Chinnaswamy Stadium with two matches played at Shaheed Veer Narayan Singh Stadium.

=== Player retention ===
Franchises were allowed to retain any number of players from their squad, including traded players while excluding players signed as temporary replacements. Franchises were required to submit their retention lists before 15 November 2025. Bengaluru retained seventeen players, including captain Rajat Patidar and former captain Virat Kohli.

Retained players
Domestic		Overseas
Yash Dayal; Bhuvneshwar Kumar; Virat Kohli; Devdutt Padikkal; Krunal Pandya; Rajat Patidar	Rasikh Salam; Abhinandan Singh; Swapnil Singh; Jitesh Sharma; Suyash Sharma	Jacob Bethell; Tim David; Josh Hazlewood; Phil Salt; Romario Shepherd; Nuwan Thushara

Released players
Batters	Wicket-keepers	All-rounders	Bowlers
Mayank Agarwal; Swastik Chikara	Tim Seifert	Manoj Bhandage; Liam Livingstone; Mohit Rathee	Blessing Muzarabani; Lungi Ngidi

=== Auction ===
The season's auction took place on 16 December 2025 in Abu Dhabi, United Arab Emirates. The auction purse for each franchise was set at ₹125 crore (US$13 million), with franchises being deducted an amount from the purse for every retained player. Bengaluru had a purse remaining of ₹16.4 crore (US$1.7 million). Bengaluru bought eight players in the auction, including three capped players and two overseas players.

Auctioned players
Domestic		Overseas	
Capped	Uncapped	Capped	Uncapped
Venkatesh Iyer	Kanishk Chouhan; Satvik Deswal; Vihaan Malhotra; Vicky Ostwal; Mangesh Yadav	Jordan Cox; Jacob Duffy	—N/a

== Squad ==
- Players with international caps as of start of 2026 IPL are listed in **bold**.
- Ages are as of 28 March 2026.
- Withdrawn players are indicated by a dagger symbol (†) and placed at the bottom of the table.

Royal Challengers Bengaluru squad for the 2026 Indian Premier League
S/N	Name	Nationality	Birth date	Batting style	Bowling style	Salary	Notes
5	Suyash Sharma	India	15 May 2003 (aged 22)	Right-handed	Right-arm leg-break	₹2.6 crore (US$270,000)	
6	**Krunal Pandya**	India	24 March 1991 (aged 35)	Left-handed	Left-arm orthodox	₹5.75 crore (US$600,000)	
8	**Tim David**	Australia	16 March 1996 (aged 30)	Right-handed	Right-arm off-break	₹3 crore (US$310,000)	Overseas
14	Abhinandan Singh	India	30 March 1997 (aged 28)	Right-handed	Right-arm fast-medium	₹30 lakh (US$31,000)	
15	**Bhuvneshwar Kumar**	India	5 February 1990 (aged 36)	Right-handed	Right-arm medium	₹10.75 crore (US$1.1 million)	
18	**Virat Kohli**	India	5 November 1988 (aged 37)	Right-handed	Right-arm medium	₹21 crore (US$2.2 million)	
22	**Jordan Cox**	England	21 October 2000 (aged 25)	Right-handed	Right-arm off-break	₹75 lakh (US$78,000)	Overseas
24	Swapnil Singh	India	22 January 1991 (aged 35)	Right-handed	Left-arm orthodox	₹50 lakh (US$52,000)	
25	**Venkatesh Iyer**	India	25 December 1994 (aged 31)	Left-handed	Right-arm medium	₹7 crore (US$730,000)	
27	**Jacob Duffy**	New Zealand	2 August 1994 (aged 31)	Right-handed	Right-arm fast-medium	₹2 crore (US$210,000)	Overseas
28	**Phil Salt**	England	28 August 1996 (aged 29)	Right-handed	—N/a	₹11.5 crore (US$1.2 million)	Overseas
37	**Devdutt Padikkal**	India	7 July 2000 (aged 25)	Left-handed	Right-arm off-break	₹2 crore (US$210,000)	
38	**Josh Hazlewood**	Australia	8 January 1991 (aged 35)	Right-handed	Right-arm fast-medium	₹12.5 crore (US$1.3 million)	Overseas
42	Rasikh Salam	India	5 April 2000 (aged 25)	Right-handed	Right-arm medium	₹6 crore (US$620,000)	
48	**Romario Shepherd**	West Indies	26 November 1994 (aged 31)	Right-handed	Right-arm fast-medium	₹1.5 crore (US$160,000)	Overseas
55	**Jitesh Sharma**	India	22 October 1993 (aged 32)	Right-handed	—N/a	₹11 crore (US$1.1 million)	Stand-in captain (Note: Jitesh Sharma captained Royal Challengers Bengaluru against Punjab Kings when Rajat Patidar was unavailable.)
97	**Rajat Patidar**	India	1 June 1993 (aged 32)	Right-handed	Right-arm off-break	₹11 crore (US$1.1 million)	Captain
—N/a	Kanishk Chouhan	India	23 September 2006 (aged 19)	Right-handed	Right-arm off-break	₹30 lakh (US$31,000)	
—N/a	Satvik Deswal	India	23 March 2007 (aged 19)	Right-handed	Left-arm orthodox spin	₹30 lakh (US$31,000)	
—N/a	Vihaan Malhotra	India	1 January 2007 (aged 19)	Left-handed	Right-arm off-break	₹30 lakh (US$31,000)	
—N/a	**Richard Gleeson**	England	2 December 1987 (aged 38)	Right-handed	Right-arm fast-medium	₹1.6 crore (US$170,000)	Overseas; replacement (Note: Richard Gleeson replaced Nuwan Thushara, after the latter withdrew due to NOC denied.)
—N/a	Vicky Ostwal	India	1 September 2002 (aged 23)	Right-handed	Left-arm orthodox spin	₹30 lakh (US$31,000)	
—N/a	Mangesh Yadav	India	10 October 2022 (aged 3)	Left-handed	Left-arm fast	₹5.2 crore (US$540,000)	
2	**Jacob Bethell** †	England	23 October 2003 (aged 22)	Left-handed	Left-arm orthodox	₹2.6 crore (US$270,000)	Overseas; withdrawn (Note: Jacob Bethell withdrew from the season due to finger injury.)
13	**Yash Dayal** †	India	13 December 1997 (aged 28)	Right-handed	Left-arm medium-fast	₹5 crore (US$520,000)	Withdrawn (Note: Yash Dayal withdrew from the season due to personal reasons.)
53	**Nuwan Thushara** †	Sri Lanka	6 August 1994 (aged 31)	Right-handed	Right-arm fast-medium	₹1.6 crore (US$170,000)	Overseas; withdrawn

== Support staff ==
Position	Name
Head coach	Andy Flower
Assistant coach	Richard Halsall
Batting coach and mentor	Dinesh Karthik
Bowling coach	Omkar Salvi

- Source: News18

== League stage ==
Royal Challengers Bengaluru began their season with two wins against Sunrisers Hyderabad and Chennai Super Kings. They lost to Rajasthan Royals, won against Mumbai Indians and Lucknow Super Giants, lost to Delhi Capitals, and won against Gujarat Titans and Delhi. Then they lost to Gujarat and Lucknow, won against Mumbai, Kolkata Knight Riders and Punjab Kings and ended the group stage with a loss to Hyderabad. With nine wins from 14 matches, they finished the league stage in first place and advanced to Qualifier 1 in the playoffs.

=== Points table ===
League stage standings
Pos	Grp	Team	Pld	W	L	NR	Pts	NRR	Qualification
1	A	Royal Challengers Bengaluru (C)	14	9	5	0	18	0.783	Advanced to Qualifier 1
2	B	Gujarat Titans (R)	14	9	5	0	18	0.695	Advanced to Qualifier 1
3	B	Sunrisers Hyderabad (4th)	14	9	5	0	18	0.524	Advanced to Eliminator
4	A	Rajasthan Royals (3rd)	14	8	6	0	16	0.189	Advanced to Eliminator
5	A	Punjab Kings	14	7	6	1	15	0.309	Eliminated
6	B	Delhi Capitals	14	7	7	0	14	−0.651	Eliminated
7	A	Kolkata Knight Riders	14	6	7	1	13	−0.147	Eliminated
8	A	Chennai Super Kings	14	6	8	0	12	−0.345	Eliminated
9	B	Mumbai Indians	14	4	10	0	8	−0.584	Eliminated
10	B	Lucknow Super Giants	14	4	10	0	8	−0.740	Eliminated

Source: ESPNcricinfo
Rules for classification: 1) Points; 2) Wins; 3) Net run rate; 4) Wickets taken per fair deliveries; 5) drawing lots
(C) Champions; (R) Runners-up

=== League progression ===
League progression
Team	Group matches														Playoffs		
Team	1	2	3	4	5	6	7	8	9	10	11	12	13	14	Q1/E	Q2	F
Royal Challengers Bengaluru	2	4	4	6	8	8	10	12	12	12	14	16	18	18	W		W

Win	Loss	No result

- Note: The total points at the end of each group match are listed.
- Note: Click on the points (group matches) or W/L (playoffs) to see the match summary.

=== Fixtures ===
Match 1
28 March 2026
19:30 (N)
Scorecard

Sunrisers Hyderabad; 201/9 (20 overs)	v	Royal Challengers Bengaluru (H); 203/4 (15.4 overs)
Ishan Kishan 80 (38); Jacob Duffy 3/22 (4 overs)		Virat Kohli 69* (38); David Payne 2/35 (3 overs)

Royal Challengers Bengaluru won by 6 wickets
M. Chinnaswamy Stadium, Bengaluru
Umpires: Ulhas Gandhe (Ind) and Jayaraman Madanagopal (Ind)
Player of the match: Jacob Duffy (Royal Challengers Bengaluru)

- Royal Challengers Bengaluru won the toss and elected to field.
- Abhinandan Singh (Royal Challengers Bengaluru) made his T20 debut.
- Jacob Duffy (Royal Challengers Bengaluru) and David Payne (Sunrisers Hyderabad) both made their IPL debuts.

Match 11
5 April 2026
19:30 (N)
Scorecard

Royal Challengers Bengaluru (H); 250/3 (20 overs)	v	Chennai Super Kings; 207 (19.4 overs)
Tim David 70* (25); Shivam Dube 1/30 (2 overs)		Sarfaraz Khan 50 (25); Bhuvneshwar Kumar 3/41 (4 overs)

Royal Challengers Bengaluru won by 43 runs
M. Chinnaswamy Stadium, Bengaluru
Umpires: K. N. Ananthapadmanabhan (Ind) and Akshay Totre (Ind)
Player of the match: Tim David (Royal Challengers Bengaluru)

- Chennai Super Kings won the toss and elected to field.
- Tim David (Royal Challengers Bengaluru) scored his 400th six in T20s.
- Bhuvneshwar Kumar (Royal Challengers Bengaluru) became the first fast bowler to take 200 wickets in IPL.

Match 16
10 April 2026
19:30 (N)
Scorecard

Royal Challengers Bengaluru; 201/8 (20 overs)	v	Rajasthan Royals (H); 202/4 (18 overs)
Rajat Patidar 63 (40); Ravi Bishnoi 2/32 (4 overs)		Dhruv Jurel 81* (43); Krunal Pandya 2/30 (4 overs)

Rajasthan Royals won by 6 wickets
ACA Cricket Stadium, Guwahati
Umpires: Kumar Dharmasena (SL) and Swaroopanand Kannur (Ind)
Player of the match: Vaibhav Sooryavanshi (Rajasthan Royals)

- Rajasthan Royals won the toss and elected to field.

Match 20
12 April 2026
19:30 (N)
Scorecard

Royal Challengers Bengaluru; 240/4 (20 overs)	v	Mumbai Indians (H); 222/5 (20 overs)
Phil Salt 78 (36); Shardul Thakur 1/32 (2 overs)		Sherfane Rutherford 71* (31); Suyash Sharma 2/47 (4 overs)

Royal Challengers Bengaluru won by 18 runs
Wankhede Stadium, Mumbai
Umpires: Swaroopanand Kannur (Ind) and Virender Sharma (Ind)
Player of the match: Phil Salt (Royal Challengers Bengaluru)

- Mumbai Indians won the toss and elected to field.

Match 23
15 April 2026
19:30 (N)
Scorecard

Lucknow Super Giants; 146 (20 overs)	v	Royal Challengers Bengaluru (H); 149/5 (15.1 overs)
Mitchell Marsh 40 (32); Rasikh Salam 4/24 (4 overs)		Virat Kohli 49 (34); Prince Yadav 3/32 (3 overs)

Royal Challengers Bengaluru won by 5 wickets
M. Chinnaswamy Stadium, Bengaluru
Umpires: Adrian Holdstock (SA) and Bhavesh Patel (Ind)
Player of the match: Josh Hazlewood (Royal Challengers Bengaluru)

- Royal Challengers Bengaluru won the toss and elected to field.
- Krunal Pandya (Royal Challengers Bengaluru) took his 100th wicket in IPL.

Match 26
18 April 2026
15:30 (D/N)
Scorecard

Royal Challengers Bengaluru (H); 175/8 (20 overs)	v	Delhi Capitals; 179/4 (19.5 overs)
Phil Salt 63 (38); Axar Patel 2/18 (3 overs)		Tristan Stubbs 60* (47); Bhuvneshwar Kumar 4/26 (4 overs)

Delhi Capitals won by 6 wickets
M. Chinnaswamy Stadium, Bengaluru
Umpires: Abhijit Bhattacharya (Ind) and Bhavesh Patel (Ind)
Player of the match: Tristan Stubbs (Delhi Capitals)

- Delhi Capitals won the toss and elected to field.
- Royal Challengers Bengaluru became the first IPL team to play in 100 matches at a home venue.

Match 34
24 April 2026
19:30 (N)
Scorecard

Gujarat Titans; 205/3 (20 overs)	v	Royal Challengers Bengaluru (H); 206/5 (18.5 overs)
Sai Sudharsan 100 (58); Bhuvneshwar Kumar 1/31 (4 overs)		Virat Kohli 81 (44); Rashid Khan 2/49 (4 overs)

Royal Challengers Bengaluru won by 5 wickets
M. Chinnaswamy Stadium, Bengaluru
Umpires: Jayaraman Madanagopal (Ind) and Amit Rana (Ind)
Player of the match: Virat Kohli (Royal Challengers Bengaluru)

- Royal Challengers Bengaluru won the toss and elected to field.

Match 39
27 April 2026
19:30 (N)
Scorecard

Delhi Capitals (H); 75 (16.3 overs)	v	Royal Challengers Bengaluru; 77/1 (6.3 overs)
Abishek Porel 30 (33); Josh Hazlewood 4/12 (3.3 overs)		Devdutt Padikkal 34* (13); Kyle Jamieson 1/42 (3 overs)

Royal Challengers Bengaluru won by 9 wickets
Arun Jaitley Stadium, Delhi
Umpires: Ajitesh Argal (Ind) and Sam Nogajski (Aus)
Player of the match: Josh Hazlewood (Royal Challengers Bengaluru)

- Royal Challengers Bengaluru won the toss and elected to field.
- Virat Kohli (Royal Challengers Bengaluru) scored his 9,000th run in IPL.
- Sahil Parakh (Delhi Capitals) made his IPL debut.

Match 42
30 April 2026
19:30 (N)
Scorecard

Royal Challengers Bengaluru; 155 (19.2 overs)	v	Gujarat Titans (H); 158/6 (15.5 overs)
Devdutt Padikkal 40 (24); Arshad Khan 3/22 (3.2 overs)		Shubman Gill 43 (18); Bhuvneshwar Kumar 3/28 (4 overs)

Gujarat Titans won by 4 wickets
Narendra Modi Stadium, Ahmedabad
Umpires: K. N. Ananthapadmanabhan (Ind) and Adrian Holdstock (SA)
Player of the match: Jason Holder (Gujarat Titans)

- Gujarat Titans won the toss and elected to field.

Match 50
7 May 2026
19:30 (N)
Scorecard

Lucknow Super Giants (H); 209/3 (19 overs)	v	Royal Challengers Bengaluru; 203/6 (19 overs)
Mitchell Marsh 111 (56); Krunal Pandya 1/31 (4 overs)		Rajat Patidar 61 (31); Prince Yadav 3/33 (4 overs)

Lucknow Super Giants won by 9 runs (DLS method)
Ekana Cricket Stadium, Lucknow
Umpires: Parashar Joshi (Ind) and Akshay Totre (Ind)
Player of the match: Mitchell Marsh (Lucknow Super Giants)

- Royal Challengers Bengaluru won the toss and elected to field.
- The match was reduced to 19 overs per side due to rain.
- Royal Challengers Bengaluru were set a revised target of 213 runs from 19 overs due to rain.

Match 54
10 May 2026
19:30 (N)
Scorecard

Mumbai Indians; 166/7 (20 overs)	v	Royal Challengers Bengaluru (H); 167/8 (20 overs)
Tilak Varma 57 (42); Bhuvneshwar Kumar 4/23 (4 overs)		Krunal Pandya 73 (46); Corbin Bosch 4/26 (4 overs)

Royal Challengers Bengaluru won by 2 wickets
Shaheed Veer Narayan Singh Stadium, Raipur
Umpires: Rohan Pandit (Ind) and Tanmay Srivastava (Ind)
Player of the match: Bhuvneshwar Kumar (Royal Challengers Bengaluru)

- Royal Challengers Bengaluru won the toss and elected to field.
- Mumbai Indians were eliminated as a result of this match.

Match 57
13 May 2026
19:30 (N)
Scorecard

Kolkata Knight Riders; 192/4 (20 overs)	v	Royal Challengers Bengaluru (H); 194/4 (19.1 overs)
Angkrish Raghuvanshi 71 (46); Bhuvneshwar Kumar 1/34 (4 overs)		Virat Kohli 105* (60); Kartik Tyagi 3/32 (4 overs)

Royal Challengers Bengaluru won by 6 wickets
Shaheed Veer Narayan Singh Stadium, Raipur
Umpires: Nitin Menon (Ind) and Rohan Pandit (Ind)
Player of the match: Virat Kohli (Royal Challengers Bengaluru)

- Royal Challengers Bengaluru won the toss and elected to field.
- Saurabh Dubey (Kolkata Knight Riders) made his IPL debut.
- Virat Kohli (Royal Challengers Bengaluru) became the fastest player to score 14,000 runs in T20s, in terms of innings played (409). He also became the first Indian player to score 10 centuries in T20s.

Match 61
17 May 2026
15:30 (N)
Scorecard

Royal Challengers Bengaluru; 222/4 (20 overs)	v	Punjab Kings (H); 199/8 (20 overs)
Venkatesh Iyer 73* (40); Harpreet Brar 2/35 (4 overs)		Shashank Singh 56 (27); Rasikh Salam 3/36 (4 overs)

Royal Challengers Bengaluru won by 23 runs
HPCA Cricket Stadium, Dharamshala
Umpires: K. N. Ananthapadmanabhan (Ind) and Adrian Holdstock (SA)
Player of the match: Venkatesh Iyer (Royal Challengers Bengaluru)

- Punjab Kings won the toss and elected to field.
- Shreyas Iyer (Punjab Kings) played in his 100th IPL match as a captain.
- Royal Challengers Bengaluru qualified for the playoffs as a result of this match.

Match 67
22 May 2026
19:30 (N)
Scorecard

Sunrisers Hyderabad (H); 255/4 (20 overs)	v	Royal Challengers Bengaluru; 200/4 (20 overs)
Ishan Kishan 79 (46); Rasikh Salam 2/52 (4 overs)		Rajat Patidar 56 (39); Eshan Malinga 2/33 (4 overs)

Sunrisers Hyderabad won by 55 runs
Rajiv Gandhi Stadium, Hyderabad
Umpires: Jayaraman Madanagopal (Ind) and Amit Rana (Ind)
Player of the match: Ishan Kishan (Sunrisers Hyderabad)

- Sunrisers Hyderabad won the toss and elected to bat.
- Rajat Patidar (Royal Challengers Bengaluru) became the fastest Indian player to score 100 sixes in IPL.

== Playoffs ==
=== Bracket ===
Qualifier 1
26 May 2026 – Dharamshala
1	Royal Challengers Bengaluru	254/5 (20 overs)
2	Gujarat Titans	162 (19.3 overs)
Eliminator
27 May 2026 – Mullanpur
3	Sunrisers Hyderabad	196 (19.2 overs)
4	Rajasthan Royals	243/8 (20 overs)

Qualifier 2
29 May 2026 – Mullanpur
Q1L	Gujarat Titans	219/3 (18.4 overs)
EW	Rajasthan Royals	214/6 (20 overs)

Final
31 May 2026 – Ahmedabad
Q1W	Royal Challengers Bengaluru	161/5 (18 overs)
Q2W	Gujarat Titans	155/8 (20 overs)

- Sources: ESPNcricinfo

=== Qualifier 1 ===
Qualifier 1
26 May 2026
19:30 (N)
Scorecard

Royal Challengers Bengaluru; 254/5 (20 overs)	v	Gujarat Titans; 162 (19.3 overs)
Rajat Patidar 93* (33); Jason Holder 2/39 (4 overs)		Rahul Tewatia 68 (43); Jacob Duffy 3/39 (4 overs)

Royal Challengers Bengaluru won by 92 runs
HPCA Cricket Stadium, Dharamshala
Umpires: Jayaraman Madanagopal (Ind) and Virender Sharma (Ind)
Player of the match: Rajat Patidar (Royal Challengers Bengaluru)

- Gujarat Titans won the toss and elected to field.
- Virat Kohli (Royal Challengers Bengaluru) became the first player to score over 600 runs in four consecutive IPL seasons.
- Royal Challengers Bengaluru's 254 was the highest innings total in IPL playoffs.
- Royal Challengers Bengaluru qualified for their second consecutive and overall fifth IPL final.

=== Final ===
Final
31 May 2026
19:30 (N)
Scorecard

Gujarat Titans; 155/8 (20 overs)	v	Royal Challengers Bengaluru; 161/5 (18 overs)
Washington Sundar 50* (37); Rasikh Salam 3/27 (4 overs)		Virat Kohli 75* (42); Rashid Khan 2/25 (4 overs)

Royal Challengers Bengaluru won by 5 wickets
Narendra Modi Stadium, Ahmedabad
Umpires: K. N. Ananthapadmanabhan (Ind) and Nitin Menon (Ind)
Player of the match: Virat Kohli (Royal Challengers Bengaluru)

- Royal Challengers Bengaluru won the toss and elected to field.
- Royal Challengers Bengaluru won their second IPL title after 2025. They also became the third team to win two consecutive IPL finals; and the first team to win the IPL and the Women's Premier League in the same year.

== Statistics ==
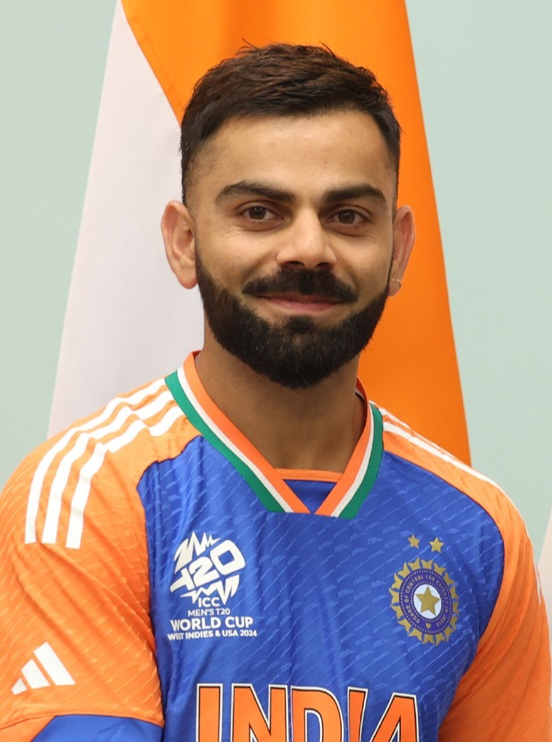
Virat Kohli scored the most runs (675) for Royal Challengers Bengaluru in the 2026 Indian Premier League.

Most runs
Runs	Player
675	Virat Kohli
501	Rajat Patidar
464	Devdutt Padikkal
305	Tim David
226	Krunal Pandya

Most wickets
Wickets	Player
28	Bhuvneshwar Kumar
19	Rasikh Salam
15	Josh Hazlewood
14	Krunal Pandya
9	2 players
