= 2026 Indian Premier League final =

Twenty20 cricket match

- Match programme cover
- Event: 2026 Indian Premier League
Gujarat Titans	Royal Challengers Bengaluru
155/8	161/5
20 overs	18 overs
- Royal Challengers Bengaluru won by 5 wickets
- Date: 31 May 2026 19:30 UTC+5:30
- Venue: Narendra Modi Stadium, Ahmedabad
- Player of the match: Virat Kohli (Royal Challengers Bengaluru)
- Umpires: K. N. Ananthapadmanabhan (Ind); Nitin Menon (Ind)

The 2026 Indian Premier League final was a Twenty20 (T20) cricket match played at the Narendra Modi Stadium in Ahmedabad, India, on 31 May 2026 to determine the winner of the 2026 Indian Premier League (IPL). The defending champions Royal Challengers Bengaluru qualified for the final after winning the Qualifier 1 against Gujarat Titans; who went on to defeat Rajasthan Royals in Qualifier 2 to secure their place in the final.

Bengaluru won the toss and elected to field first; Gujarat scored 155/8 in their innings, which Bengaluru chased down in 18 overs scoring 161/5, to win their second IPL title and become the third team to win two consecutive IPL finals. They also became the first team to win the IPL and the Women's Premier League in the same year. A closing ceremony was held during the match's innings break. Bengaluru's captain Rajat Patidar dedicated the victory to the victims of the 2025 Bengaluru crowd crush.

== Background ==
The 2026 Indian Premier League was the 19th edition of the Indian Premier League (IPL), a professional Twenty20 (T20) cricket league, organised by the Board of Control for Cricket in India (BCCI). The season commenced on 28 March and consisted of 10 teams competing in 74 matches. After the conclusion of the group stage, four teams advanced to the playoffs, which began on 26 May and concluded with the final played on 31 May at the Narendra Modi Stadium, Ahmedabad. This was the fourth IPL final held at that venue, after the 2022, 2023 and 2025 events.

The defending champions Royal Challengers Bengaluru qualified for their fifth IPL final. They were the fourth team to qualify for two consecutive IPL finals and had previously been runners-up in 2009, 2011 and 2016. Their opponents were the Gujarat Titans, who qualified for their third IPL final: they were champions in 2022 and runners-up in 2023. Both teams were competing for their second titles and had won their maiden titles at this same venue.

== Road to the final ==
Road to the final
Royal Challengers Bengaluru
vs
Gujarat Titans
League stage

League progression
Team	Group matches														Playoffs		
Team	1	2	3	4	5	6	7	8	9	10	11	12	13	14	Q1/E	Q2	F
Royal Challengers Bengaluru	2	4	4	6	8	8	10	12	12	12	14	16	18	18	W		W
Gujarat Titans	0	0	2	4	6	6	6	8	10	12	14	16	16	18	L	W	L

Win	Loss	No result

- Note: The total points at the end of each group match are listed.
- Note: Click on the points (group matches) or W/L (playoffs) to see the match summary.
Opponent
Date
Result
Points
Match
Opponent
Date
Result
Points
Sunrisers Hyderabad
28 March 2026
Won
2
1
Punjab Kings
31 March 2026
Lost
0
Chennai Super Kings
5 April 2026
Won
4
2
Rajasthan Royals
4 April 2026
Lost
0
Rajasthan Royals
10 April 2026
Lost
4
3
Delhi Capitals
8 April 2026
Won
2
Mumbai Indians
12 April 2026
Won
6
4
Lucknow Super Giants
12 April 2026
Won
4
Lucknow Super Giants
15 April 2026
Won
8
5
Kolkata Knight Riders
17 April 2026
Won
6
Delhi Capitals
18 April 2026
Lost
8
6
Mumbai Indians
20 April 2026
Lost
6
Gujarat Titans
24 April 2026
Won
10
7
Royal Challengers Bengaluru
24 April 2026
Lost
6
Delhi Capitals
27 April 2026
Won
12
8
Chennai Super Kings
26 April 2026
Won
8
Gujarat Titans
30 April 2026
Lost
12
9
Royal Challengers Bengaluru
30 April 2026
Won
10
Lucknow Super Giants
7 May 2026
Lost
12
10
Punjab Kings
3 May 2026
Won
12
Mumbai Indians
10 May 2026
Won
14
11
Rajasthan Royals
9 May 2026
Won
14
Kolkata Knight Riders
13 May 2026
Won
16
12
Sunrisers Hyderabad
12 May 2026
Won
16
Punjab Kings
17 May 2026
Won
18
13
Kolkata Knight Riders
16 May 2026
Lost
16
Sunrisers Hyderabad
22 May 2026
Lost
18
14
Chennai Super Kings
21 May 2026
Won
18
Playoff stage

Qualifier 1
26 May 2026 – Dharamshala
1	Royal Challengers Bengaluru	254/5 (20 overs)
2	Gujarat Titans	162 (19.3 overs)
Eliminator
27 May 2026 – Mullanpur
3	Sunrisers Hyderabad	196 (19.2 overs)
4	Rajasthan Royals	243/8 (20 overs)

Qualifier 2
29 May 2026 – Mullanpur
Q1L	Gujarat Titans	219/3 (18.4 overs)
EW	Rajasthan Royals	214/6 (20 overs)

Final
31 May 2026 – Ahmedabad
Q1W	Royal Challengers Bengaluru	161/5 (18 overs)
Q2W	Gujarat Titans	155/8 (20 overs)

- Sources: ESPNcricinfo
Opponent
Date
Result
Match
Opponent
Date
Result
Gujarat Titans
26 May 2026
Won
Q1
Royal Challengers Bengaluru
26 May 2026
Lost
Qualified for the final
Q2
Rajasthan Royals
29 May 2026
Won
2026 Indian Premier League final

=== Royal Challengers Bengaluru ===
Royal Challengers Bengaluru began their season with two wins against Sunrisers Hyderabad and Chennai Super Kings. They lost to Rajasthan Royals, won against Mumbai Indians and Lucknow Super Giants, lost to Delhi Capitals, and won against Gujarat and Delhi. Then they lost to Gujarat and Lucknow, won against Mumbai, Kolkata Knight Riders and Punjab Kings and ended the group stage with a loss to Hyderabad. With nine wins from 14 matches, they finished the league stage in first place and advanced to Qualifier 1 in the playoffs. They defeated Gujarat in Qualifier 1, to advance to the final.

=== Gujarat Titans ===
Gujarat Titans began their season with two losses against Punjab and Rajasthan. They won their next three matches against Delhi, Lucknow and Kolkata; lost to Mumbai and Bengaluru; won against Chennai, Bengaluru, Punjab, Rajasthan and Hyderabad; lost to Kolkata and won against Chennai. They also had nine wins from 14 matches, finishing the league stage in second place, behind Bengaluru on the tiebreaker (net run rate). They advanced to Qualifier 1 in the playoffs, which they lost to Bengaluru. However, Gujarat then defeated Rajasthan in Qualifier 2, to reach the final.

== Match ==
=== Match officials ===
The on-field umpires for the final were K. N. Ananthapadmanabhan and Nitin Menon, while the third umpire was Jayaraman Madanagopal. Virender Sharma was the reserve umpire and Javagal Srinath was the match referee. This was the first time in an IPL final that all five officials were Indian.

=== Team and toss ===
Bengaluru's captain Rajat Patidar won the toss and elected to field; he also stated that their team would be unchanged from their previous game while Gujarat's captain Shubman Gill stated that Arshad Khan would replace Sai Kishore in their team.

- Royal Challengers Bengaluru: Jacob Duffy (SUB), Venkatesh Iyer (IMP), Virat Kohli, Devdutt Padikkal, Rajat Patidar (c), Krunal Pandya, Tim David, Jitesh Sharma (wk), Romario Shepherd, Bhuvneshwar Kumar, Josh Hazlewood, Rasikh Salam
- Gujarat Titans: Prasidh Krishna (IMP), Sai Sudharsan, Shubman Gill (c), Nishant Sindhu, Jos Buttler (wk), Washington Sundar, Arshad Khan, Rahul Tewatia (SUB), Jason Holder, Rashid Khan, Kagiso Rabada, Mohammed Siraj

(IMP) indicates an impact player and (SUB) indicates the player who was substituted.

Impact players
Team	Out	In
Royal Challengers Bengaluru	Jacob Duffy	Venkatesh Iyer
Gujarat Titans	Rahul Tewatia	Prasidh Krishna

=== Match scorecard ===
Final
31 May 2026
19:30 (N)
Scorecard

Gujarat Titans; 155/8 (20 overs)	v	Royal Challengers Bengaluru; 161/5 (18 overs)
Washington Sundar 50* (37); Rasikh Salam 3/27 (4 overs)		Virat Kohli 75* (42); Rashid Khan 2/25 (4 overs)

Royal Challengers Bengaluru won by 5 wickets
Narendra Modi Stadium, Ahmedabad
Umpires: K. N. Ananthapadmanabhan (Ind) and Nitin Menon (Ind)
Player of the match: Virat Kohli (Royal Challengers Bengaluru)

- Royal Challengers Bengaluru won the toss and elected to field.
- Royal Challengers Bengaluru won their second IPL title after 2025. They also became the third team to win two consecutive IPL finals; and the first team to win the IPL and the Women's Premier League in the same year.

=== Gujarat Titans innings ===
Put in to bat first, the Gujarat openers Shubman Gill and Sai Sudharsan were dismissed in the third and fourth overs, bowled by Bhuvneshwar Kumar and Josh Hazlewood respectively. Washington Sundar scored 50 runs from 37 balls while Nishant Sindhu scored 20 runs from 18 balls. All the other Gujarat batters were dismissed for fewer than 20 runs; they ended their innings with a score of 155 runs for the loss of eight wickets. Rasikh Salam picked up three wickets for Bengaluru.

Gujarat Titans batting
Player	Status	Runs	Balls	4s	6s	Strike rate
Sai Sudharsan	c †Jitesh b Kumar	12	12	2	0	100.00
Shubman Gill	c Patidar b Hazlewood	10	8	2	0	125.00
Nishant Sindhu	c Padikkal b Rasikh	20	18	3	0	111.11
Jos Buttler	st †Jitesh b Pandya	19	23	1	0	82.60
Washington Sundar	not out	50	37	5	0	135.13
Arshad Khan	c Rasikh b Hazlewood	15	6	0	2	250.00
Rahul Tewatia (SUB)	c Patidar b Rasikh	7	5	1	0	140.00
Jason Holder	c Hazlewood b Kumar	7	5	1	0	140.00
Rashid Khan	c Shepherd b Rasikh	7	3	0	1	233.33
Kagiso Rabada	not out	3	3	0	0	100.00
Mohammed Siraj	did not bat					
Extras	(lb 1, w 4)	5				
Total	(8 wickets; 20 overs)	155				RR: 7.75

Fall of wickets: 1–22 (Gill, 2.2 ov), 2–26 (Sudharsan, 3.4 ov), 3–55 (Sindhu, 7.6 ov), 4–73 (Buttler, 12.1 ov), 5–99 (Arshad Khan, 14.1 ov), 6–115 (Tewatia, 16.1 ov), 7–142 (Holder, 18.3 ov), 8–151 (Rashid Khan, 19.2 ov)

Royal Challengers Bengaluru bowling
Bowler	Overs	Maidens	Runs	Wickets	Econ	Wides	NBs
Jacob Duffy (SUB)	4	0	38	0	9.50	3	0
Bhuvneshwar Kumar	4	0	29	2	7.25	0	0
Josh Hazlewood	4	0	37	2	9.25	1	0
Rasikh Salam	4	0	27	3	6.75	0	0
Krunal Pandya	4	0	23	1	5.75	0	0

=== Closing ceremony ===
A closing ceremony for the IPL season was held during the innings break of the final. It included a live musical performance from Kailash Kher, a laser light show, and a fireworks display.

=== Royal Challengers Bengaluru innings ===
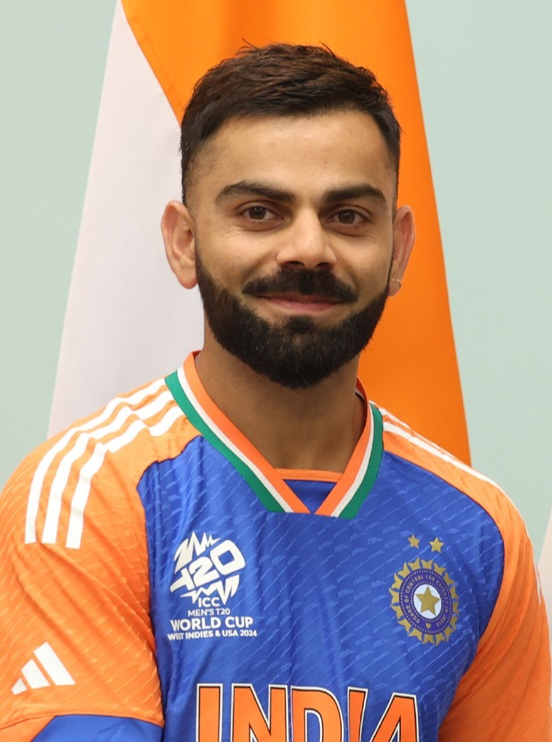
Virat Kohli scored 75 runs for Bengaluru in the final, and received the player of the match award.

Chasing the target of 156, Bengaluru openers Venkatesh Iyer and Virat Kohli shared an opening partnership of 62 runs before Iyer was dismissed for 32. Devdutt Padikkal and Krunal Pandya were dismissed for one run each, while Rajat Patidar made 15. The score was 91 for 4 after 8.5 overs, with Kohli still not out. The following batters Tim David and Jitesh Sharma contributed 24 and 11 runs respectively, while Kohli increased the run rate; he would finish with a strike rate of 178. Bengaluru reached a score of 161 runs for the loss of five wickets after 18 overs, passing the target and securing the title. Bowler Rashid Khan took two wickets for Gujarat, while Kohli was the highest run-scorer with 75 runs not out from 42 balls and received the player of the match award.

Royal Challengers Bengaluru batting
Player	Status	Runs	Balls	4s	6s	Strike rate
Venkatesh Iyer (IMP)	c Rabada b Siraj	32	16	4	2	200.00
Virat Kohli	not out	75	42	9	3	178.57
Devdutt Padikkal	c Arshad b Rabada	1	4	0	0	25.00
Rajat Patidar	c Rabada b Rashid	15	13	1	1	115.38
Krunal Pandya	lbw b Rashid	1	2	0	0	50.00
Tim David	c †Buttler b Arshad	24	17	3	1	141.17
Jitesh Sharma	not out	11	14	1	0	78.57
Romario Shepherd	did not bat					
Bhuvneshwar Kumar	did not bat					
Josh Hazlewood	did not bat					
Rasikh Salam	did not bat					
Extras	(lb 1, w 1)	2				
Total	(5 wickets; 18 overs)	161				RR: 8.94

Fall of wickets: 1–62 (Iyer, 4.3 ov), 2–63 (Padikkal, 5.1 ov), 3–89 (Patidar, 8.2 ov), 4–91 (Krunal, 8.5 ov), 5–132 (David, 13.6 ov)

Gujarat Titans bowling
Bowler	Overs	Maidens	Runs	Wickets	Econ	Wides	NBs
Mohammed Siraj	4	0	36	1	9.00	1	0
Kagiso Rabada	3	0	44	1	14.66	0	0
Jason Holder	2	0	16	0	8.00	0	0
Rashid Khan	4	0	25	2	6.25	0	0
Arshad Khan	4	0	32	1	8.00	0	0
Prasidh Krishna (IMP)	1	0	7	0	7.00	0	0

== Aftermath ==
Bengaluru became the third team to win two consecutive IPL finals after Chennai and Mumbai. They also became the first team to win the IPL and the Women's Premier League in the same year, having won the women's tournament earlier in the year. Bengaluru received ₹20 crore (US$2.1 million) and Gujarat received ₹12.5 crore (US$1.3 million) in prize money. Bengaluru captain Patidar dedicated the victory to the victims of the crowd crush that occurred during last year's victory celebrations.

== See also ==
- 2026 Women's Premier League (cricket)
- 2026 Women's Premier League (cricket) final
