= 2025 Indian Premier League final =

Twenty20 cricket match

- Match programme cover
- Event: 2025 Indian Premier League
Royal Challengers Bengaluru	Punjab Kings
190/9	184/7
20 overs	20 overs
- Royal Challengers Bengaluru won by 6 runs
- Date: 3 June 2025 19:30 UTC+5:30
- Venue: Narendra Modi Stadium, Ahmedabad
- Player of the match: Krunal Pandya (Royal Challengers Bengaluru)
- Umpires: Jayaraman Madanagopal (Ind); Nitin Menon (Ind)
- Attendance: 91,419

The 2025 Indian Premier League final was a Twenty20 (T20) cricket match played at the Narendra Modi Stadium in Ahmedabad, India, on 3 June 2025 to determine the winner of the 2025 Indian Premier League (IPL). It was originally scheduled to be played at Eden Gardens in Kolkata, on 25 May 2025 before being rescheduled.

It was played between Royal Challengers Bengaluru and Punjab Kings. Punjab won the toss and elected to field first; Bengaluru scored 190/9 in their innings. In the second innings, Punjab scored 184/7. Bengaluru won the match by 6 runs to win their maiden IPL trophy after 18 years.

== Background ==
The 2025 Indian Premier League was the 18th edition of the Indian Premier League (IPL), a professional Twenty20 (T20) cricket league, organised by the Board of Control for Cricket in India (BCCI). On 16 February, the fixtures for the season were confirmed with the 2025 season set to commence from 22 March with 10 teams competing in 74 matches across 13 venues. The final was scheduled for 25 May at Eden Gardens, Kolkata with the venue to host its third IPL final after 2013 and 2015.

On 9 May 2025, the remaining matches were suspended due to the 2025 India–Pakistan crisis. The revised schedule was announced on 12 May, and the remaining matches resumed on 17 May and were held across six venues. On 20 May, the playoff fixtures were confirmed with the final rescheduled for 3 June at the Narendra Modi Stadium, Ahmedabad with the venue hosting its third final after 2022 and 2023.

Royal Challengers Bengaluru qualified for their fourth IPL final after being runners-up in 2009, 2011 and 2016, while Punjab Kings qualified for their second IPL final after being runners-up in 2014. Both teams were competing for their maiden titles.

=== Closing ceremony ===
A closing ceremony was held at the Narendra Modi stadium ahead of the final commencing at 18:00 IST. Grammy Award winning singer Shankar Mahadevan along with his sons Shivam and Siddharth Mahadevan performed a musical tribute to the Indian Armed Forces in the aftermath of Operation Sindoor.

== Road to the final ==
=== Overview ===
- Source: ESPNcricinfo

Royal Challengers Bengaluru
vs
Punjab Kings
League stage

League progression
Team	Group matches														Playoffs		
Team	1	2	3	4	5	6	7	8	9	10	11	12	13	14	Q1/E	Q2	F
Royal Challengers Bengaluru	2	4	4	6	6	8	8	10	12	14	16	17	17	19	W		W
Punjab Kings	2	4	4	6	6	8	10	10	11	13	15	17	17	19	L	W	L

Win	Loss	No result

- Note: The total points at the end of each group match are listed.
- Note: Click on the points (group matches) or W/L (playoffs) to see the match summary.
Opponent
Date
Result
Points
Match
Opponent
Date
Result
Points
Kolkata Knight Riders
22 March 2025
Won
2
1
Gujarat Titans
25 March 2025
Won
2
Chennai Super Kings
28 March 2025
Won
4
2
Lucknow Super Giants
1 April 2025
Won
4
Gujarat Titans
2 April 2025
Lost
4
3
Rajasthan Royals
5 April 2025
Lost
4
Mumbai Indians
7 April 2025
Won
6
4
Chennai Super Kings
8 April 2025
Won
6
Delhi Capitals
10 April 2025
Lost
6
5
Sunrisers Hyderabad
12 April 2025
Lost
6
Rajasthan Royals
13 April 2025
Won
8
6
Kolkata Knight Riders
15 April 2025
Won
8
Punjab Kings
18 April 2025
Lost
8
7
Royal Challengers Bengaluru
18 April 2025
Won
10
Punjab Kings
20 April 2025
Won
10
8
Royal Challengers Bengaluru
20 April 2025
Lost
10
Rajasthan Royals
24 April 2025
Won
12
9
Kolkata Knight Riders
26 April 2025
N/R
11
Delhi Capitals
27 April 2025
Won
14
10
Chennai Super Kings
30 April 2025
Won
13
Chennai Super Kings
3 May 2025
Won
16
11
Lucknow Super Giants
4 May 2025
Won
15
Kolkata Knight Riders
17 May 2025
N/R
17
12
Rajasthan Royals
18 May 2025
Won
17
Sunrisers Hyderabad
23 May 2025
Lost
17
13
Delhi Capitals
24 May 2025
Lost
17
Lucknow Super Giants
27 May 2025
Won
19
14
Mumbai Indians
26 May 2025
Won
19
Playoff stage

Qualifier 1
29 May 2025 – Mullanpur
1	Punjab Kings	101 (14.1 overs)
2	Royal Challengers Bengaluru	106/2 (10 overs)
Eliminator
30 May 2025 – Mullanpur
3	Gujarat Titans	208/6 (20 overs)
4	Mumbai Indians	228/5 (20 overs)

Qualifier 2
1 June 2025 – Ahmedabad
Q1L	Punjab Kings	207/5 (19 overs)
EW	Mumbai Indians	203/6 (20 overs)

Final
3 June 2025 – Ahmedabad
Q1W	Royal Challengers Bengaluru	190/9 (20 overs)
Q2W	Punjab Kings	184/7 (20 overs)

Opponent
Date
Result
Match
Opponent
Date
Result
Punjab Kings
29 May 2025
Won
Q1
Royal Challengers Bengaluru
29 May 2025
Lost
Qualified for the final
Q2
Mumbai Indians
1 June 2025
Won
2025 Indian Premier League final

=== Royal Challengers Bengaluru ===
Royal Challengers Bengaluru began their season with two wins against Kolkata Knight Riders and Chennai Super Kings. They lost to Gujarat Titans, won against Mumbai Indians, lost to Delhi Capitals, won against Rajasthan Royals and lost to Punjab. Bengaluru won their next four matches against Punjab, Rajasthan, Delhi and Chennai. Their twelfth match against Kolkata was abandoned due to rain. They lost to Sunrisers Hyderabad and won against Lucknow Super Giants; to finish the league stage in second place with nine wins from 14 matches, and advanced to Qualifier 1 in the playoffs. They defeated Punjab in Qualifier 1 to qualify for their fourth final.

=== Punjab Kings ===
Punjab Kings began their season with two wins against Gujarat and Lucknow. They lost to Rajasthan, won against Chennai, lost to Hyderabad, won against Kolkata and Bengaluru, and lost to Bengaluru. Their ninth match against Kolkata was abandoned due to rain. Punjab won their next three matches against Chennai, Lucknow and Rajasthan, lost to Delhi and won against Mumbai; to finish the league stage in first place with nine wins from 14 matches, and advanced to Qualifier 1 in the playoffs. They lost Qualifier 1 to Bengaluru but defeated Mumbai in Qualifier 2 to qualify for their second final.

== Match ==
=== Match officials ===
Officials for the final were India's Jayaraman Madanagopal and Nitin Menon as the on-field umpires, along with New Zealand's Chris Gaffaney as the third umpire, India's K. N. Ananthapadmanabhan as the reserve umpire and Javagal Srinath as match referee.

- On-field umpires: Jayaraman Madanagopal (Ind) and Nitin Menon (Ind)
- Third umpire: Chris Gaffaney (NZ)
- Reserve umpire: K. N. Ananthapadmanabhan (Ind)
- Match referee: Javagal Srinath (Ind)

=== Team and toss ===
Punjab's captain Shreyas Iyer won the toss and elected to field first. Both teams were unchanged from their previous matches.

- Royal Challengers Bengaluru: Suyash Sharma (IMP), Phil Salt, Virat Kohli, Mayank Agarwal (SUB), Rajat Patidar (c), Liam Livingstone, Jitesh Sharma (wk), Romario Shepherd, Krunal Pandya, Bhuvneshwar Kumar, Yash Dayal, Josh Hazlewood
- Punjab Kings: Yuzvendra Chahal (SUB), Priyansh Arya, Prabhsimran Singh (IMP), Josh Inglis (wk), Shreyas Iyer (c), Nehal Wadhera, Shashank Singh, Marcus Stoinis, Azmatullah Omarzai, Kyle Jamieson, Vijaykumar Vyshak, Arshdeep Singh

=== Royal Challengers Bengaluru innings ===
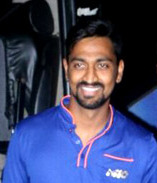
Krunal Pandya took 2 wickets for Bengaluru in the final, and received the player of the match award.

Put to bat first, Bengaluru lost their opener Salt in the second over. Agarwal was dismissed in the seventh over, captain Patidar in the eleventh; this left the team at 96 runs for the loss of three wickets. Kohli was dismissed in the fifteenth over leaving the team at 131 runs. Livingstone scored 25 runs before being dismissed in the seventeenth over. Sharma scored 24 runs in 10 balls before being dismissed in the eighteenth over. Shepherd scored 17 runs in 9 balls before being dismissed in the last over. In the final over bowled by Arshdeep, Punjab gave away only three runs while taking three wickets, restricting Bengaluru to 190 runs for the loss of nine wickets. Kohli was the highest run-scorer for Bengaluru with 43 runs from 35 balls, while Arshdeep and Jamieson picked up three wickets each for Punjab.

=== Punjab Kings innings ===
Chasing the target of 191, the Punjab openers Priyansh and Prabhsimran were dismissed in the fifth and ninth overs respectively. Punjab captain Iyer was dismissed in the tenth over for a single run, leaving the team at 79 runs for the loss of three wickets. Inglis scored 39 runs in 23 balls before being dismissed in the thirteenth over. Wadhera was dismissed in the seventeenth over, Stoinis also on the seventeenth and Omarzai on the eighteenth over, leaving the team at 145 runs for the loss of seven wickets. Meanwhile, Shashank scored 61 runs not out from 30 balls to take the team total to 184 runs for the loss of seven wickets. Shashank was the highest run-scorer for Punjab, while Krunal Pandya picked up two wickets for Bengaluru, giving away only 17 runs in 4 overs and received the player of the match award.

=== Match details ===
Final
3 June 2025
19:30 (N)
Scorecard

Royal Challengers Bengaluru; 190/9 (20 overs)	v	Punjab Kings; 184/7 (20 overs)
Virat Kohli 43 (35); Arshdeep Singh 3/40 (4 overs)		Shashank Singh 61* (30); Krunal Pandya 2/17 (4 overs)

Royal Challengers Bengaluru won by 6 runs
Narendra Modi Stadium, Ahmedabad
Attendance: 91,419
Umpires: Jayaraman Madanagopal (Ind) and Nitin Menon (Ind)
Player of the match: Krunal Pandya (Royal Challengers Bengaluru)

- Punjab Kings won the toss and elected to field.
- This match was originally scheduled for 25 May at the Eden Gardens, before being rescheduled.
- Royal Challengers Bengaluru won their maiden title after 18 years.

Match scorecard

"(IMP)" indicates an Impact player
"(SUB)" indicates a Substituted player

1st innings

Royal Challengers Bengaluru batting
Player	Status	Runs	Balls	4s	6s	Strike rate
Phil Salt	c Iyer b Jamieson	16	9	2	1	177.77
Virat Kohli	c & b Omarzai	43	35	3	0	122.85
Mayank Agarwal (SUB)	c Arshdeep b Chahal	24	18	2	1	133.33
Rajat Patidar	lbw b Jamieson	26	16	1	2	162.50
Liam Livingstone	lbw b Jamieson	25	15	0	2	166.66
Jitesh Sharma	b Vyshak	24	10	2	2	240.00
Romario Shepherd	lbw b Arshdeep	17	9	1	1	188.88
Krunal Pandya	c Iyer b Arshdeep	4	5	0	0	80.00
Bhuvneshwar Kumar	c Arya b Arshdeep	1	2	0	0	50.00
Yash Dayal	not out	1	1	0	0	100.00
Josh Hazlewood	did not bat					
Extras	(w 9)	9				
Total	(9 wickets; 20 overs)	190		11	9	RR: 9.50

Fall of wickets: 1–18 (Salt, 1.4 ov), 2–56 (Agarwal, 6.2 ov), 3–96 (Patidar, 10.5 ov), 4–131 (Kohli, 14.5 ov), 5–167 (Livingstone, 16.5 ov), 6–171 (Jitesh, 17.4 ov), 7–188 (Shepherd, 19.2 ov), 8–189 (Krunal, 19.4 ov), 9–190 (Kumar, 19.6)

Punjab Kings bowling
Bowler	Overs	Maidens	Runs	Wickets	Econ	Wides	NBs
Arshdeep Singh	4	0	40	3	10.00	2	0
Kyle Jamieson	4	0	48	3	12.00	3	0
Azmatullah Omarzai	4	0	35	1	8.75	2	0
Vijaykumar Vyshak	4	0	30	1	7.50	2	0
Yuzvendra Chahal (SUB)	4	0	37	1	9.25	0	0

2nd innings

Impact players
Team	Out	In
Royal Challengers Bengaluru	Mayank Agarwal	Suyash Sharma
Punjab Kings	Yuzvendra Chahal	Prabhsimran Singh

Punjab Kings batting
Player	Status	Runs	Balls	4s	6s	Strike rate
Priyansh Arya	c Salt b Hazlewood	24	19	4	0	126.31
Prabhsimran Singh (IMP)	c Kumar b Krunal	26	22	0	2	118.18
Josh Inglis	c Livingstone b Krunal	39	23	1	4	169.56
Shreyas Iyer	c †Jitesh b Shepherd	1	2	0	0	50.00
Nehal Wadhera	c Krunal b Kumar	15	18	0	1	83.33
Shashank Singh	not out	61	30	3	6	203.33
Marcus Stoinis	c Dayal b Kumar	6	2	0	1	300.00
Azmatullah Omarzai	c sub (Bhandage) b Dayal	1	2	0	0	50.00
Kyle Jamieson	not out	0	2	0	0	0.00
Vijaykumar Vyshak	did not bat					
Arshdeep Singh	did not bat					
Extras	(lb 8, w 3)	11				
Total	(7 wickets; 20 overs)	184		8	14	RR: 9.20

Fall of wickets: 1–43 (Arya, 4.6 ov), 2–72 (Prabhsimran, 8.3 ov), 3–79 (Iyer, 9.4 ov), 4–98 (Inglis, 12.1 ov), 5-136 (Wadhera, 16.2 ov), 6–142 (Stoinis, 16.4 ov), 7–145 (Omarzai, 17.2 ov)

Royal Challengers Bengaluru bowling
Bowler	Overs	Maidens	Runs	Wickets	Econ	Wides	NBs
Bhuvneshwar Kumar	4	0	38	2	9.50	0	0
Yash Dayal	3	0	18	1	6.00	0	0
Josh Hazlewood	4	0	54	1	13.50	2	0
Krunal Pandya	4	0	17	2	4.25	0	0
Suyash Sharma (IMP)	2	0	19	0	9.50	0	0
Romario Shepherd	3	0	30	1	10.00	1	0

== Aftermath ==
"This win is as much for the fans as it is for the team," [...] "It's been 18 long years. I’ve given this team my youth, my prime, my experience. Every single season, I've walked out with a heart full of hope and a mind obsessed with victory. To finally have this moment... it's beyond belief."

— Virat Kohli, Hindustan Times

This was Bengaluru's maiden IPL title after 18 years. Krunal Pandya became the first player to win the player of the match awards in two IPL finals, with his first coming in 2017 for Mumbai. Bengaluru's captain Patidar praised his team bowlers' performance in the final match. Punjab's captain Iyer praised his team youngsters' performance throughout the season. Bengaluru received ₹20 crore (US$2.1 million) and Punjab received ₹12.5 crore (US$1.3 million) in prize money.

=== Celebrations ===
On 4 June, the Bengaluru team flew to Bengaluru on a chartered flight and were honoured on the steps of the Vidhana Soudha by the Karnataka chief minister Siddaramaiah, deputy chief minister D. K. Shivakumar and governor Thawar Chand Gehlot. An open top bus victory parade from Vidhana Soudha to the M. Chinnaswamy Stadium was initially planned, but was cancelled a few hours before the event after the Bengaluru Police denied permission citing traffic congestion in the central business district. It was announced that the team would proceed directly to the M. Chinnaswamy Stadium for a felicitation ceremony scheduled at 17:00 IST.

Ahead of the felicitation ceremony, overcrowding at multiple entry gates of the stadium caused chaos and a crowd crush, resulting in eleven fatalities and injuries to forty-seven others. The deceased included six men and five women. The ceremony was cut short after reports of the fatalities emerged. According to the state government's testimony in a Karnataka High Court hearing, over 1,400 police personnel had been deployed around the stadium and approximately 250,000 fans had gathered on the surrounding streets, including people who had arrived from outside Karnataka. The government stated in the High Court that the event was conducted without any standard operating procedure.

== See also ==
- 2025 Women's Premier League (cricket)
- 2025 Women's Premier League (cricket) final
