= Narendra Modi Stadium =

International cricket stadium in Ahmedabad, Gujarat, India

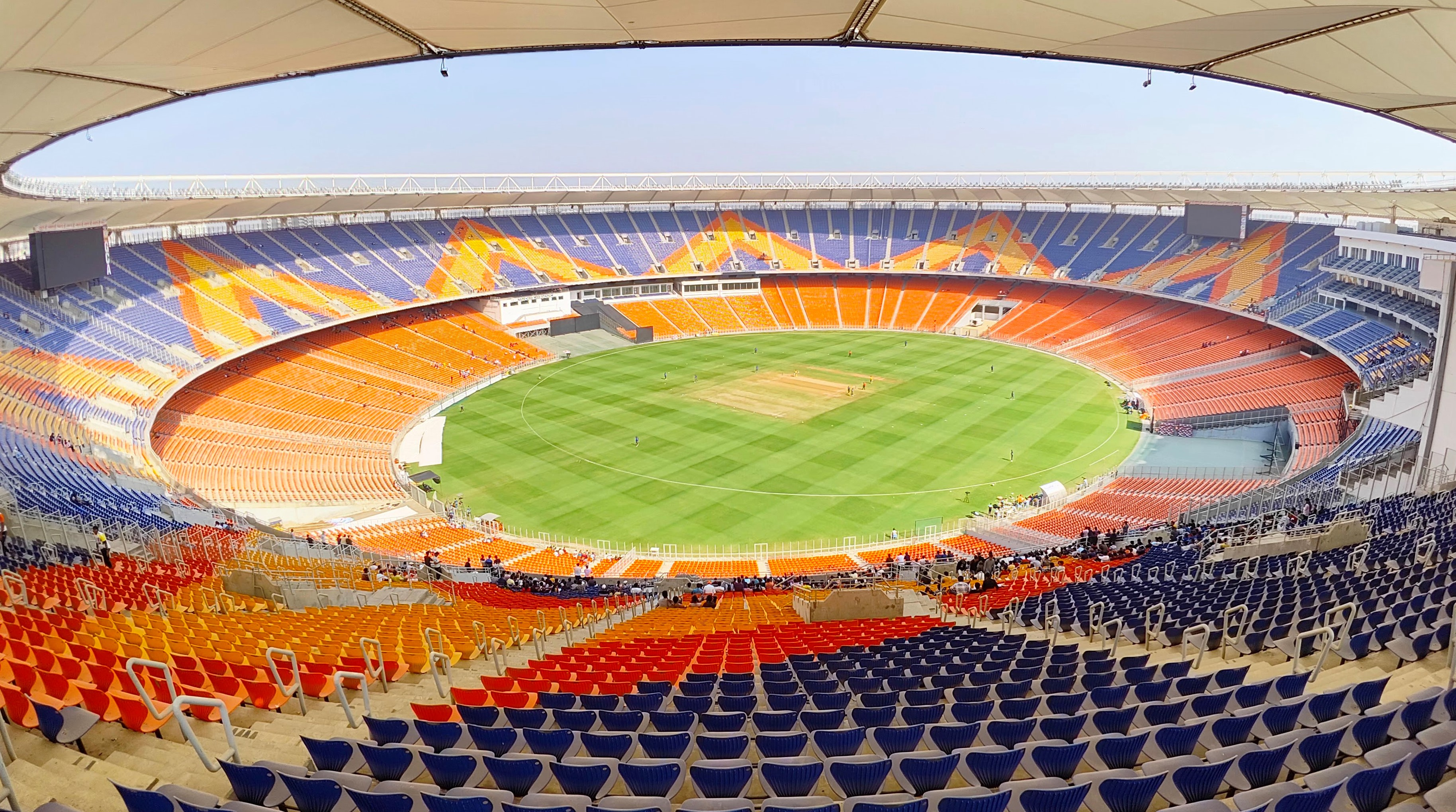
- Interactive map of Narendra Modi Stadium
- Address: Sardar Vallabhbhai Patel Sports Enclave; Motera, Ahmedabad, Gujarat; India
- Location: Motera, Ahmedabad, Gujarat, India
- Coordinates: 23°05′29″N 72°35′50″E
- Elevation: 84 m (276 ft)
- Owner: Gujarat Cricket Association
- Operator: Gujarat Cricket Association
- Capacity: 132,000 (total) (Note: According to the architects, the capacity of the stadium is 110,000) (2020–present)
- Executive suites: 76
- Surface: Bermuda grass
- Scoreboard: Yes
- Record attendance: 111,989 (Coldplay's Music of the Spheres World Tour)
- Field size: 160 metres (180 yd) × 140 metres (150 yd)
- Field shape: Oval
- Acreage: 63 acres (25 ha)
- Public transit: Narendra Modi Stadium; Red Line Motera Stadium
- Parking: 13000 (Note: It is said that parking for 10,000 two-wheelers and 3,000 cars is available.)

Construction
- Groundbreaking: 2015; 11 years ago
- Built: 2015–2020
- Opened: 24 February 2020; 6 years ago
- Cost: ₹800 crore (US$83 million)
- Architect: Populous
- Builder: Larsen and Toubro
- Structural engineer: Walter P Moore Engineers and Consultants
- Main contractor: Larsen and Toubro

Tenants
- India men's national team (2020–present); India women's national team (2020–present); Gujarat men's team (2020–present); Gujarat women's team (2020–present); Gujarat Titans (2022–present); Gujarat Giants (2023–present)

Website
- GCA official website

Ground information
- Location: Ahmedabad, Gujarat, India
- Country: India
- Operator: Gujarat Cricket Association
- End names
- Adani Pavilion End; Jio End

International information
- First men's Test: 24–28 February 2021: India v England
- Last men's Test: 2–6 October 2025: India v West Indies
- First men's ODI: 6 February 2022: India v West Indies
- Last men's ODI: 12 February 2025: India v England
- First men's T20I: 12 March 2021: India v England
- Last men's T20I: 8 March 2026: India v New Zealand
- First women's ODI: 24 October 2024: India v New Zealand
- Last women's ODI: 29 October 2024: India v New Zealand

Narendra Modi Stadium is an international cricket stadium in Motera, Ahmedabad, Gujarat, India. With a total capacity of 132,000, it is the world's largest cricket stadium and the largest overall stadium in the world by capacity. It is owned by the Gujarat Cricket Association, and hosts both domestic and international cricket matches. The stadium has hosted several high-profile matches, such as the 2023 Cricket World Cup final and the 2026 Men's T20 World Cup final. The stadium will also be used for the 2030 Commonwealth Games. Situated near the Sabarmati River, the stadium is named after the prime minister of India, Narendra Modi.

It replaced Sardar Patel Gujarat Stadium, which hosted domestic and international cricket in the city until its demolition in 2015, including the 1987, 1996 and 2011 Cricket World Cups. In 2014, it was decided that a new stadium should be built on the same plot. The new stadium, originally named Motera Stadium, was designed by Populous and built by Larsen and Toubro. It took five years to build, at an estimated cost of ₹800 crore (US$83 million). After completion, the new arena replaced the Melbourne Cricket Ground as the world's largest cricket stadium. The stadium has four dressing rooms, 11 centre pitches, and two practice grounds. The practice grounds can also serve as venues for domestic matches.

On 24 February 2020, the new stadium first opened to the public by hosting the Namaste Trump event, which saw an approximate attendance of 125,000 people. One year later, on 24 February 2021, the stadium was officially inaugurated by Indian president Ram Nath Kovind and renamed "Narendra Modi Stadium" in honour of Modi who had previously served as the Chief Minister of Gujarat (2001–2014) and President of the Gujarat Cricket Association (2009–2014). This ceremony took place just hours before the venue hosted its first-ever international cricket match—a day-night pink-ball Test between India and England.

On 29 September 2022, the opening ceremony of the 2022 National Games of India was held in the stadium.

== Planning and construction ==
=== Conception ===
The idea to build a new stadium was proposed by Narendra Modi himself who was the president of the Gujarat Cricket Association and the Chief Minister of Gujarat at the same time. Shortly before Modi moved to Delhi after becoming the prime minister of India, there were discussions about adding minor upgrades to the stadium and further developing areas of the structure at the pavilion end. Modi asked officials to build a new, larger stadium instead of pursuing minor renovation work.

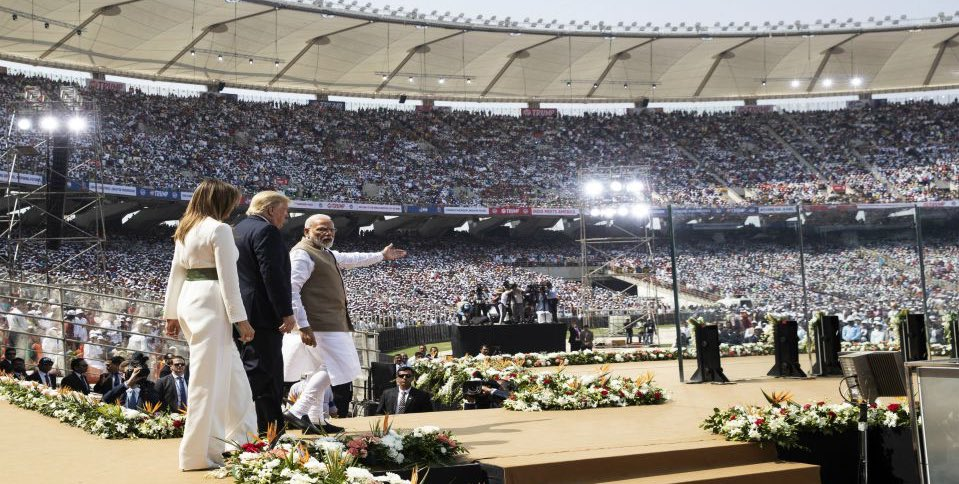
US president Donald Trump and Indian prime minister Narendra Modi at the Narendra Modi Stadium, 24 February 2020.

In October 2015, the stadium was demolished for reconstruction, though some media referred to it as a renovation. The total cost of reconstruction was estimated to be ₹700 crores (₹7 billion (US$73 million)). However, the final cost was reported at ₹800 crore (US$83 million). The redevelopment, originally planned to be completed in 2019, finished in February 2020.

=== Bids ===
After starting demolition work at the end of 2015, the GCA issued a request for tender on 1 January 2016 in The Times of India and The Indian Express. Nine bidders showed interest and purchased the tender documents, out of which three submitted technical and financial bids on time; they were the Shapoorji Pallonji Group, Nagarjuna Construction Company, and Larsen & Toubro (L&T). A Tender Commercial Committee (TCC) of nine experts was formed to evaluate tenders. Additionally, STUP Consultants, a civil engineering consultancy firm based in Mumbai, was appointed as the project management consultant to evaluate proposals and technical details of each bid working with the TCC.

Each of the three bidders presented their designs, models, and technical details of their concepts and designs. Due to the sheer size and complexity of the project, the bidders were evaluated on many parameters. These included efficiency, resources, project length, and ease of implementation, among others. The bidders were ranked and weighted based on the parameters.

Bids submitted for the reconstruction of the Sardar Patel Gujarat Stadium
Bidder	Bid	Evaluation	Notes
Larsen & Toubro	₹677.19 crore (US$70 million)	Lowest-1 (L1)	Winning bid. Financially lowest and technically ranked first.
Shapoorji Pallonji & Co. Ltd.	₹847.88 crore (US$88 million)	Lowest-2 (L2)	
Nagarjuna Construction Co. Ltd.	₹1,065 crore (US$110 million)	Highest (L3)	

In the end, Larsen & Turbo was selected as the stadium's principal contractor.

=== Building work ===
L&T took over the construction work of the stadium in December 2016. On 16 January 2017, the Gujarat Cricket Association oversaw the project, which formally began on the same day. The stadium was planned to be finished in 2 years, and the reconstruction project was estimated to cost around ₹700 crore ($93 million). Final completion of the stadium was finished in February 2020, and it hosted an England-India day-night test match in 2021.

Mumbai-based commercial kitchen consultant "Span Asia" was hired to collaborate with Populous and L&T on food and beverage-related areas such as concession counters, main stadium kitchens, player kitchens, VIP/VVIP boxes, corporate boxes, press & media boxes, pantries, the GCA Club, and related areas.

== Service ==
In 2020, the event "Namaste Trump" was organized at the stadium for the visit of US president Donald J. Trump. 125,000 attendees were recorded. Before it became clear that the complex would continue to use the name "Sardar Patel Sports Enclave" and that only the stadium would receive a new name, Congress first criticized the decision.

Prime Minister Modi inaugurated the 2022 National Games of India in the arena.

The stadium later became the home ground of IPL team Gujarat Titans and hosted the 2022, 2023, and 2025 IPL Finals.

The stadium also hosted five matches of the 2023 Cricket World Cup, including the opening and final games, as well as high-profile matches pitting India against Pakistan and Australia against England.

British rock band Coldplay played two shows at the stadium on 25 and 26 January 2025, as part of their Music of the Spheres World Tour.

== Tournament results ==
=== Men's World Cup ===
Tournament	Dates	Team 1	Team 2	Round	Result
2023	5 October 2023	England	New Zealand	Group Stage	New Zealand won by 9 wickets
2023	14 October 2023	Pakistan	India	Group Stage	India won by 7 wickets
2023	4 November 2023	Australia	England	Group Stage	Australia won by 33 runs
2023	10 November 2023	Afghanistan	South Africa	Group Stage	South Africa won by 5 wickets
2023	19 November 2023	India	Australia	Final	Australia won by 6 wickets

=== ICC Men's T20 World Cup ===
Year	Date	Team #1	Team #2	Round	Result
2026	9 February 2026	South Africa	Canada	Group Stage	South Africa won by 57 runs
2026	11 February 2026	South Africa	Afghanistan	Group Stage	South Africa won the second Super Over
2026	14 February 2026	New Zealand	South Africa	Group Stage	South Africa won by 7 wickets
2026	18 February 2026	India	Netherlands	Group Stage	India won by 17 runs
2026	22 February 2026	South Africa	India	Super 8	South Africa won by 76 runs
2026	26 February 2026	West Indies	South Africa	Super 8	South Africa won by 9 wickets
2026	8 March 2026	India	New Zealand	Final	India won by 96 runs

=== Indian Premier League Finals ===
Tournament	Date	Team 1	Team 2	Round	Result
2022	29 May 2022	Gujarat Titans	Rajasthan Royals	Final	GT won by 7 wickets
2023	29 May 2023	Chennai Super Kings	Gujarat Titans	Final	CSK won by 5 wickets (DLS method)
2025	3 June 2025	Royal Challengers Bengaluru	Punjab Kings	Final	RCB won by 6 runs
2026	31 May 2026	Royal Challengers Bengaluru	Gujarat Titans	Final	RCB won by 5 wickets

== Design and facilities ==
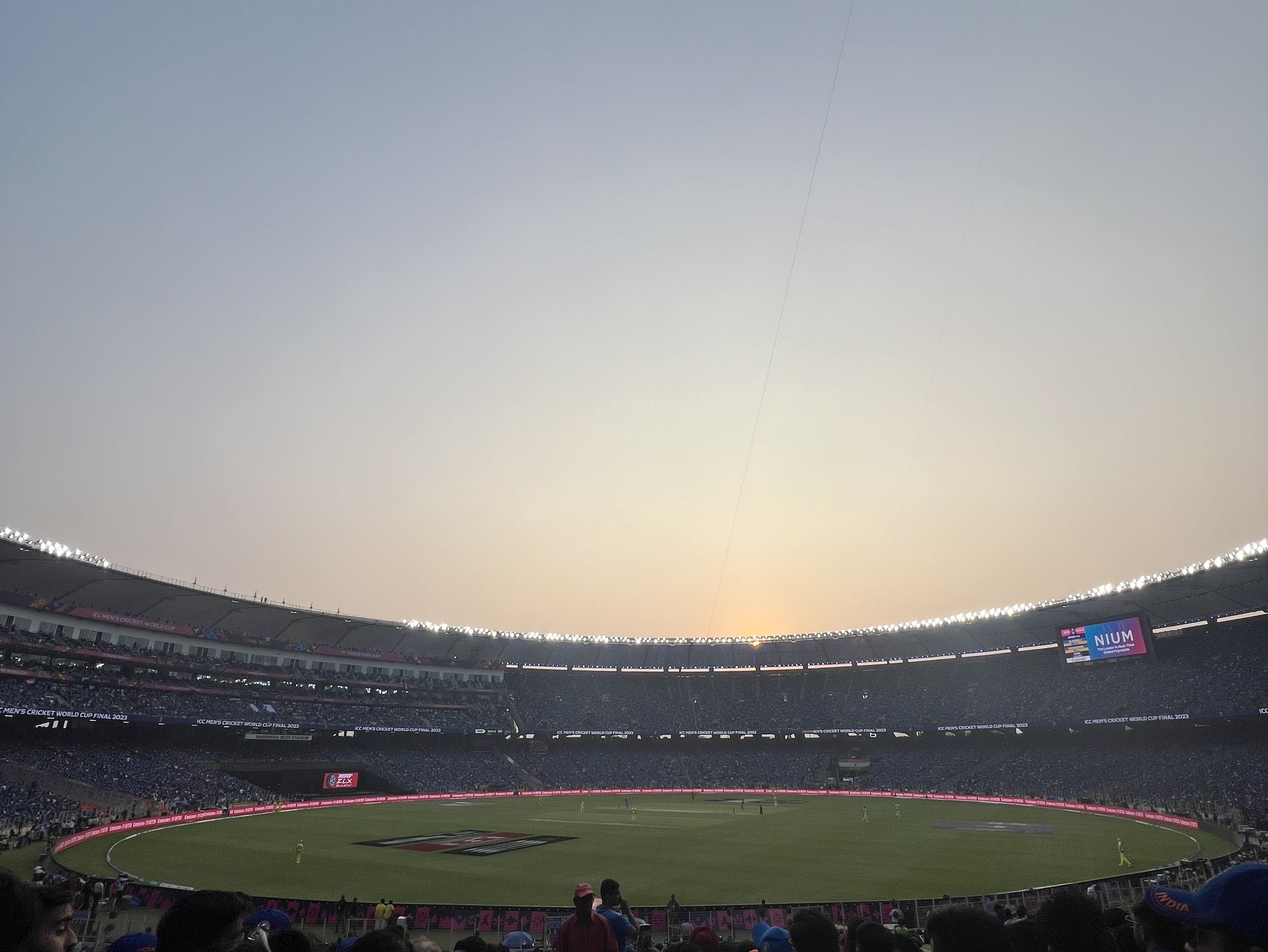
The Stadium during the 2023 Cricket World Cup final between India and Australia

The stadium is built on 63 acres of land and has four entry points, with a metro line at one of the entry points. It has 76 corporate boxes that can hold 25 persons each, a 55-room clubhouse, an Olympic size swimming pool, and four dressing rooms. A food court and hospitality area are available in each spectator stand. The stadium also includes an indoor cricket academy and practice pitches, with dormitories for 40 athletes.

The stands generally follow a two-tier structure; however, there is a three-tier main pavilion. The two-tier structure is supported from beneath by numerous Y-shaped columns, which eliminate the need for pillars and thus give spectators an unobstructed view of the entire field from all parts of the stadium. An LED light system lines the stadium roof's inside edge. This eliminates the need for floodlights and helps reduce shadows on the pitch. The LED lights are installed on an antibacterial, fireproof canopy with PTFE membrane that covers 30 metres (98 ft) out of 55 metres (180 ft) width of the seating area. The roof was installed by Walter P. Moore, and was specifically designed to be lightweight and separate from the seating bowls in order to improve earthquake resistance.

The ground has 11 center pitches. The playing field has sensors to detect the need for water for the grass, which can automatically activate 67 fully automated underground pop-up sprinklers. The ground surface is made of Bermuda grass. The stadium has an extensive drainage system.

The stadium premises have many facilities, including an indoor cricket practice area, badminton, tennis, and squash courts, a table tennis area, a 3D projector theatre, three practice grounds, and 50 rooms. The parking lot can accommodate 3,000 cars and 10,000 two-wheelers. A ramp leading to the stadium is designed to facilitate the movement of around 60,000 people simultaneously. The arena has been designed in such a way that the upper stands can remain empty (such as during smaller events) while maintaining a sufficient crowd atmosphere. However, a game between Royal Challengers Bangalore and Rajasthan Royals in the IPL 2024 saw a near houseful crowd of over 1 lakh.

There was a plan that the stadium would be connected to the nearest metro station by a skywalk bridge in order to decrease road congestion. Construction was planned to be completed after September 2020. As of November 2023, the skywalk is yet to be constructed.

== Political events ==
=== Namaste Trump ===
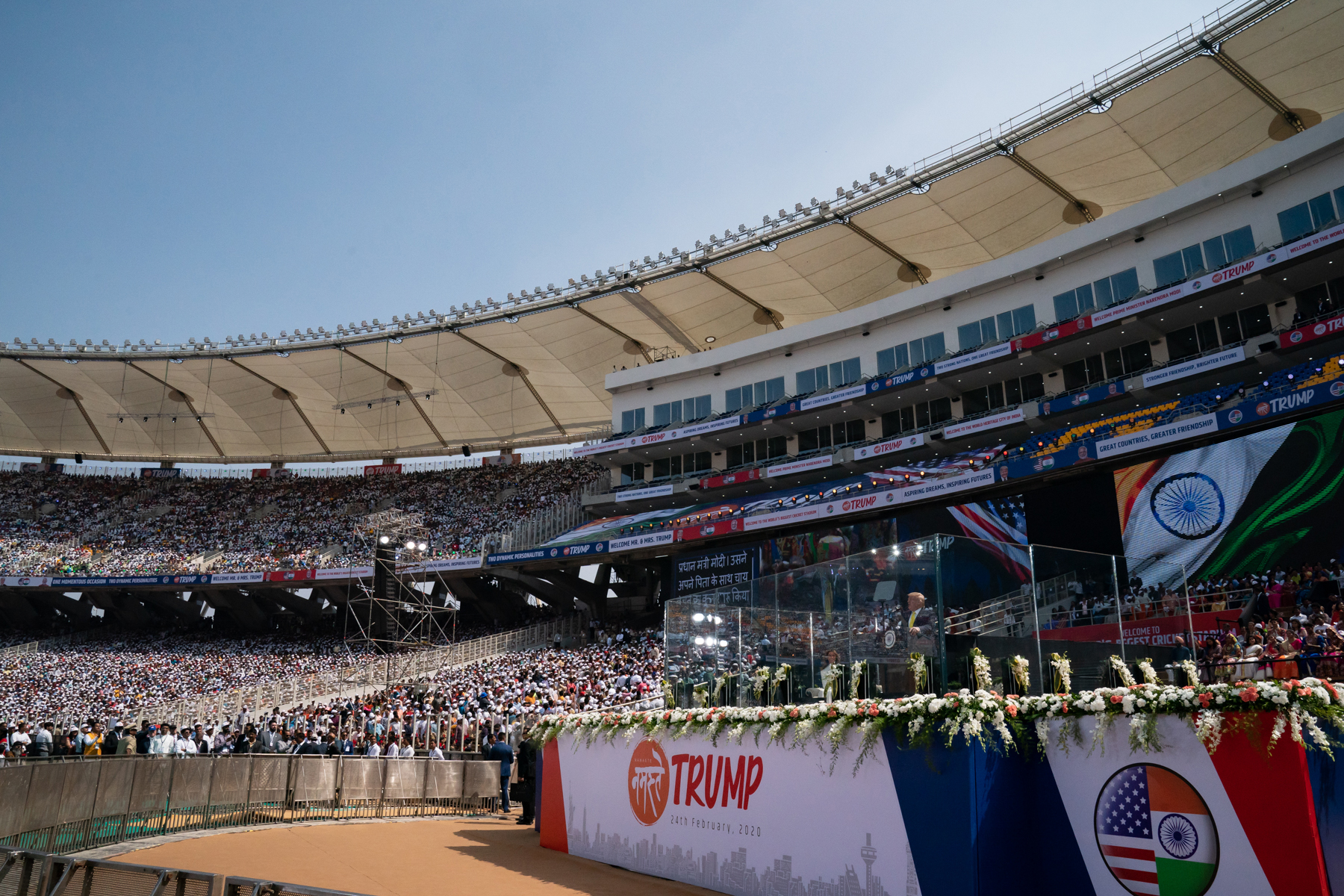
The stadium during the Namaste Trump event, as US president Donald Trump gives a speech

In 2020, the stadium was the venue of the "Namaste Trump" event, which was organized for the maiden visit of US president Donald Trump to India by Indian prime minister Narendra Modi. The event mirrored the "Howdy Modi" event held in Houston, Texas, US.

=== 75 years of Friendship through Cricket ===
On 9 March 2023, Narendra Modi Stadium hosted the 75 Years of Friendship through Cricket Event, which was attended by Prime Minister Narendra Modi and visiting Australian prime minister Anthony Albanese. The event was held in conjunction with the fourth Test match of the Border-Gavaskar Trophy between India and Australia.

The event began with the two prime ministers singing the national anthems of their respective countries and shaking hands with the players of both teams. They then visited a gallery showcasing glimpses of 75 years of cricket friendship between the two countries. After the gallery visit, the two prime ministers took a lap of honor around the stadium in a specially designed golf cart. They were greeted by loud cheers from the crowd, who waved Indian and Australian flags. The event concluded with the two prime ministers tossing the coin to start the Test match.

The 75 Years of Friendship through Cricket Event was a celebration of the strong ties between India and Australia, which have been forged over many years through the shared love of cricket. The event was also an opportunity to promote sports diplomacy and to encourage people from both countries to come together and celebrate their friendship.

== One Day International matches involving India ==
The following are the ODI matches played by India at Narendra Modi Stadium since 2021.

Date	Opponent	Result	Notes
6 February 2022	West Indies	India won by 6 wickets	
9 February 2022	West Indies	India won by 44 runs	
11 February 2022	West Indies	India won by 96 runs	
14 October 2023	Pakistan	India won by 7 wickets	2023 Cricket World Cup
19 November 2023	Australia	Australia won by 6 wickets	2023 Cricket World Cup Final
12 February 2025	England	India won by 142 runs	
India's ODI record at the venue (2021–2026)
Played: 6, Won: 5, Lost: 1

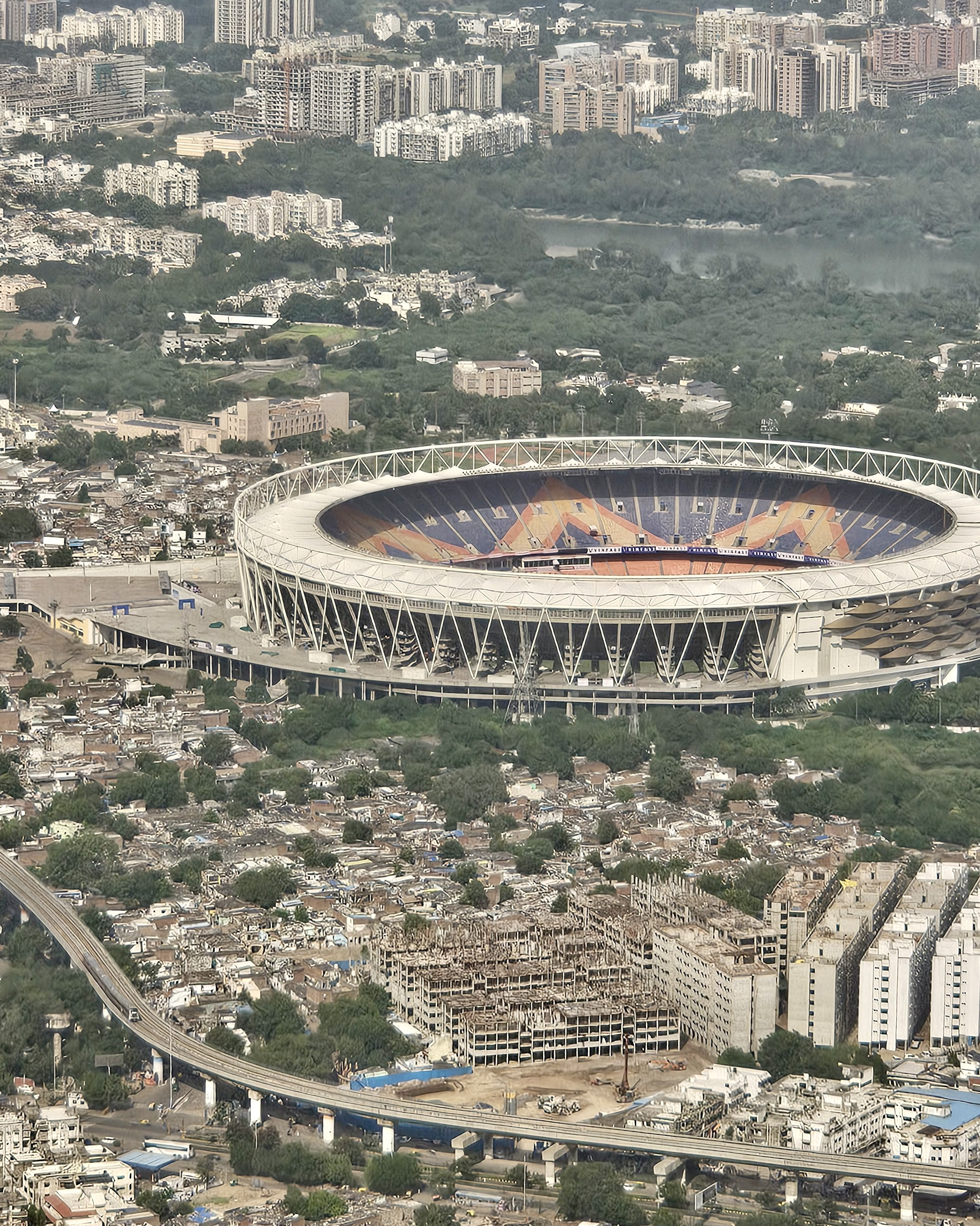
Aerial view of Narendra Modi Stadium in 2025

== T20I matches involving India ==
The following are the T20I matches played by India at Narendra Modi Stadium since 2021.

Date	Opponent	Result	Notes
12 March 2021	England	England won by 8 wickets	
14 March 2021	England	India won by 7 wickets	
16 March 2021	England	England won by 8 wickets	
18 March 2021	England	India won by 8 runs	
20 March 2021	England	India won by 36 runs	
1 February 2023	New Zealand	India won by 168 runs	
19 December 2025	South Africa	India won by 30 runs	
18 February 2026	Netherlands	India won by 17 runs	2026 ICC Men's T20 World Cup (Group stage)
22 February 2026	South Africa	South Africa won by 76 runs	2026 ICC Men's T20 World Cup (Super 8)
8 March 2026	New Zealand	India won by 96 runs	2026 ICC Men's T20 World Cup Final
India's T20I record at the venue (2021–2026)
Played: 10, Won: 7, Lost: 3

Last updated: March 2026. Source: ESPNcricinfo, Cricbuzz, ICC records.

== World Cup matches ==
=== 2023 Cricket World Cup ===
5 October 2023
14:00 (D/N)
Scorecard

England; 282/9 (50 overs)	v	New Zealand; 283/1 (36.2 overs)
Joe Root 77 (86); Matt Henry 3/48 (10 overs)		Devon Conway 152* (121); Sam Curran 1/47 (6 overs)

New Zealand won by 9 wickets
Narendra Modi Stadium, Ahmedabad
Attendance: 47,518
Umpires: Kumar Dharmasena (SL) and Nitin Menon (Ind)
Player of the match: Rachin Ravindra (NZ)

- New Zealand won the toss and elected to field.
- All of England's eleven batsmen reached double figures, the first such instance in ODIs.
- Rachin Ravindra (NZ) scored his maiden century in ODIs.
- Devon Conway and Rachin Ravindra's 273-run partnership surpassed Martin Guptill and Will Young's 203 for the highest partnership for second wicket for New Zealand.

14 October 2023
14:00 (D/N)
Scorecard

Pakistan; 191 (42.5 overs)	v	India; 192/3 (30.3 overs)
Babar Azam 50 (58); Jasprit Bumrah 2/19 (7 overs)		Rohit Sharma 86 (63); Shaheen Afridi 2/36 (6 overs)

India won by 7 wickets
Narendra Modi Stadium, Ahmedabad
Attendance: Undisclosed
Umpires: Marais Erasmus (SA) and Richard Illingworth (Eng)
Player of the match: Jasprit Bumrah (Ind)

- India won the toss and elected to field.

4 November 2023
14:00 (D/N)
Scorecard

Australia; 286 (49.3 overs)	v	England; 253 (48.1 overs)
Marnus Labuschagne 71 (83); Chris Woakes 4/54 (9.3 overs)		Ben Stokes 64 (90); Adam Zampa 3/21 (10 overs)

Australia won by 33 runs
Narendra Modi Stadium, Ahmedabad
Attendance: 55,052
Umpires: Marais Erasmus (SA) and Chris Gaffaney (NZ)
Player of the match: Adam Zampa (Aus)

- England won the toss and elected to field.
- England were eliminated as a result of this match.

10 November 2023
14:00 (D/N)
Scorecard

Afghanistan; 244 (50 overs)	v	South Africa; 247/5 (47.3 overs)
Azmatullah Omarzai 97* (107); Gerald Coetzee 4/44 (10 overs)		Rassie van der Dussen 76* (95); Mohammad Nabi 2/35 (10 overs)

South Africa won by 5 wickets
Narendra Modi Stadium, Ahmedabad
Attendance: 10,927
Umpires: Chris Brown (NZ) and Nitin Menon (Ind)
Player of the match: Rassie van der Dussen (SA)

- Afghanistan won the toss and elected to bat.
- Heinrich Klaasen and Kagiso Rabada (SA) played their 50th and 100th ODI respectively.
- Afghanistan were eliminated as a result of this match.

19 November 2023
14:00 (D/N)
Scorecard

India; 240 (50 overs)	v	Australia; 241/4 (43 overs)
KL Rahul 66 (107); Mitchell Starc 3/55 (10 overs)		Travis Head 137 (120); Jasprit Bumrah 2/43 (9 overs)

Australia won by 6 Wickets
Narendra Modi Stadium, Ahmedabad
Attendance: 92,453
Umpires: Richard Illingworth (Eng) and Richard Kettleborough (Eng)
Player of the match: Travis Head (Aus)

- Australia won the toss and elected to field.
- Australia won their record sixth World Cup title.

=== 2026 T20 World Cup ===
9 February 2026
19:00 UTC+5:30 (N)
Scorecard

South Africa; 213/4 (20 overs)	v	Canada; 156/8 (20 overs)
Aiden Markram 59 (32); Ansh Patel 3/31 (4 overs)		Navneet Dhaliwal 64 (49); Lungi Ngidi 4/31 (4 overs)

South Africa won by 57 runs
Narendra Modi Stadium, Ahmedabad
Umpires: Jayaraman Madanagopal (Ind) and Nitin Menon (Ind)
Player of the match: Lungi Ngidi (SA)

- Canada won the toss and elected to field.
- This was the first time South Africa and Canada faced each other in T20Is.

11 February 2026
11:00 UTC+5:30 (N)
Scorecard

South Africa; 187/6 (20 overs)	v	Afghanistan; 187 (19.4 overs)
Ryan Rickelton 61 (28); Azmatullah Omarzai 3/41 (4 overs)		Rahmanullah Gurbaz 84 (42); Lungi Ngidi 3/26 (4 overs)

Match tied (South Africa won the second Super Over)
Narendra Modi Stadium, Ahmedabad
Umpires: Jayaraman Madanagopal (Ind) and Sharfuddoula (Ban)
Player of the match: Lungi Ngidi (SA)

- Afghanistan won the toss and elected to field
- Super Over: Afghanistan 17/0, South Africa 17/1.
- Second Super Over: South Africa 23/0, Afghanistan 19/2.

14 February 2026
19:00 UTC+5:30 (N)
Scorecard

New Zealand; 175/7 (20 overs)	v	South Africa; 178/3 (17.1 overs)
Mark Chapman 48 (26); Marco Jansen 4/40 (4 overs)		Aiden Markram 86* (44); Rachin Ravindra 1/9 (1 over)

South Africa won by 7 wickets
Narendra Modi Stadium, Ahmedabad
Attendance: 54,923
Umpires: Roland Black (Ire) and Paul Reiffel (Aus)
Player of the match: Marco Jansen (SA)

- South Africa won the toss and elected to field.
- Quinton de Kock (SA) became the first South African to score 3,000 runs in T20Is.
- Aiden Markram scored the fastest half-century (19 balls) for South Africa in the T20 World Cup and equalled with Rohit Sharma and Dasun Shanaka for the fastest half-century by a captain in the T20 World Cup.

18 February 2026
19:00 UTC+5:30 (N)
Scorecard

India; 193/6 (20 overs)	v	Netherlands; 176/7 (20 overs)
Shivam Dube 66 (31); Logan van Beek 3/56 (4 overs)		Bas de Leede 33 (23); Varun Chakravarthy 3/14 (3 overs)

India won by 17 runs
Narendra Modi Stadium, Ahmedabad
Attendance: 70,000
Umpires: Sam Nogajski (Aus) and Allahuddien Paleker (SA)
Player of the match: Shivam Dube (Ind)

- India won the toss and elected to bat.
- India extended their record winning-streaks in T20 World Cups to 12 consecutive matches, and 17 in ICC limited-overs tournaments.

22 February 2026
19:00 UTC+5:30 (N)
Scorecard

South Africa; 187/7 (20 overs)	v	India; 111 (18.5 overs)
David Miller 63 (35); Jasprit Bumrah 3/15 (4 overs)		Shivam Dube 42 (37); Marco Jansen 4/22 (3.5 overs)

South Africa won by 76 runs
Narendra Modi Stadium, Ahmedabad
Attendance: 90,954
Umpires: Chris Gaffaney (NZ) and Richard Kettleborough (Eng)
Player of the match: David Miller (SA)

- South Africa won the toss and elected to bat.
- South Africa broke India's record 12-match win streak in T20 World Cups.
- This was India's first loss at an ICC limited-overs competition since the 2023 Cricket World Cup final.
- This was India's largest loss margin (by runs) in the history of T20 World Cup.
- Jasprit Bumrah broke Ravichandran Ashwin's record for the most wickets by an Indian in the T20 World Cup.

26 February 2026
15:00 UTC+5:30 (D/N)
Scorecard

West Indies; 176/8 (20 overs)	v	South Africa; 177/1 (16.1 overs)
Romario Shepherd 52* (37); Lungi Ngidi 3/30 (4 overs)		Aiden Markram 82* (46); Roston Chase 1/46 (4 overs)

South Africa won by 9 wickets
Narendra Modi Stadium, Ahmedabad
Attendance: 28,422
Umpires: Kumar Dharmasena (SL) and Sharfuddoula (Ban)
Player of the match: Aiden Markram (SA)

- South Africa won the toss and elected to field.
- Jason Holder and Romario Shepherd (WI) recorded the highest partnership for the 8th wicket in T20Is.

March 8, 2026
19:00 UTC+5:30 (N)
Scorecard

India; 255/5 (20 overs)	v	New Zealand; 192 (19 overs)
Sanju Samson 89 (49); James Neesham 3/46 (4 overs)		Tim Seifert 52 (26); Jasprit Bumrah 4/15 (4 overs)

India won by 96 runs
Narendra Modi Stadium, Ahmedabad
Attendance: 86,824
Umpires: Richard Illingworth (Eng) and Alex Wharf (Eng)
Player of the match: Jasprit Bumrah (Ind)

- New Zealand won the toss and elected to field.
- This was India's fourth T20 World Cup final; most for any nation.
- This was India's 15th appearance at finals of ICC limited-overs tournaments; the most by any nation.
- India scored the highest-ever total (255) in the final of the T20 World Cup, surpassing their own score of 176 in 2024.
- Sanju Samson (Ind) made the highest individual score in the final of the Men's T20 World Cup.
- India became the first ever team to successfully defend their title. Along with being the first nation to win a T20 World Cup on home soil.

== Domestic cricket ==
The stadium is the home ground of the Gujarat cricket team, the Gujarat women's cricket team, and the IPL franchise Gujarat Titans. Other than the main ground inside the stadium, it also has two grounds known as "Narendra Modi Stadium A Ground" and "Narendra Modi Stadium B Ground", which are located near the stadium on the eastern side. They host domestic cricket matches for tournaments such as the Ranji Trophy. The stadium hosted the 2022 and 2023 IPL finals. In 2022, the home team Gujarat Titans prevailed; in 2023, the Chennai Super Kings won their fifth title. The 2022 final for the Vijay Hazare Trophy was held inside the arena. Maharashtra scored 248/9 in first innings; Saurashtra chased down it in 46.3 overs. Maharashtra's Ruturaj Gaikwad and Saurashtra's Sheldon Jackson scored hundreds.

== Notable achievements ==
- On 24 February 2021, the arena hosted its first Day/night Test, with India facing off against England.
- In 2022, the arena hosted the IPL final between the Gujarat Titans and the Rajasthan Royals. The Titans won the IPL in their inaugural season. This event was attended by 104,859 people, the highest attendance in the history of the stadium and cricket in general.
- In the 2023 IPL final between the Gujarat Titans and Chennai Super Kings (CSK), MS Dhoni (playing in his 250th match) captained CSK to their fifth IPL victory, tying the Mumbai Indians for the record of most IPL trophies.
- In the 2026 Men's T20 World Cup, India defeated New Zealand in the final held here, thus becoming the only team to win back-to-back T20 World Cups (2024 and 2026), and a record three titles in the T20 World Cup.
- In the 2025 and 2026 IPL finals, Royal Challengers Bengaluru defeated Punjab Kings and Gujarat Titans respectively to win their first two titles. RCB thus retained the title successfully.

== Records ==
=== Test match records ===
- Best bowling (in a match): Axar Patel 11/70 – India v England, 13 February 2021.
- Most runs: Rahul Dravid (India) 771 Runs (Mat:7 Inn: 14 HS: 222 Ave: 59.30 SR: 49.10 100s–3 50s–1), Sachin Tendulkar – 642 runs, VVS Laxman – 574 runs. (including stats of Sardar Patel Stadium)
- Most wickets: Anil Kumble (India) 36 Wickets (Mat:7 Runs:964 BBI:7/115 BBM: 10/233 Ave:26.77 Econ: 2.29 SR: 70.1 5W/I: 3 10W/M:1). (including stats of Sardar Patel Stadium)

=== One Day International match records ===
- Highest individual score: Devon Conway 152 (121) (19x4; 3x6) – New Zealand v England, 2023.
- Best bowling: Prasidh Krishna 4/14 (9.0 overs) – India v West Indies, 9 February 2022.
- Most runs: Rohit Sharma – 355 runs. (including stats of Sardar Patel Stadium)
- Most wickets: Kapil Dev (India) 10 Wickets (Mat:6 Runs:156 Best:3/26 Ave:15.60 Econ:3.04). (including stats of Sardar Patel Stadium)

== Gallery ==
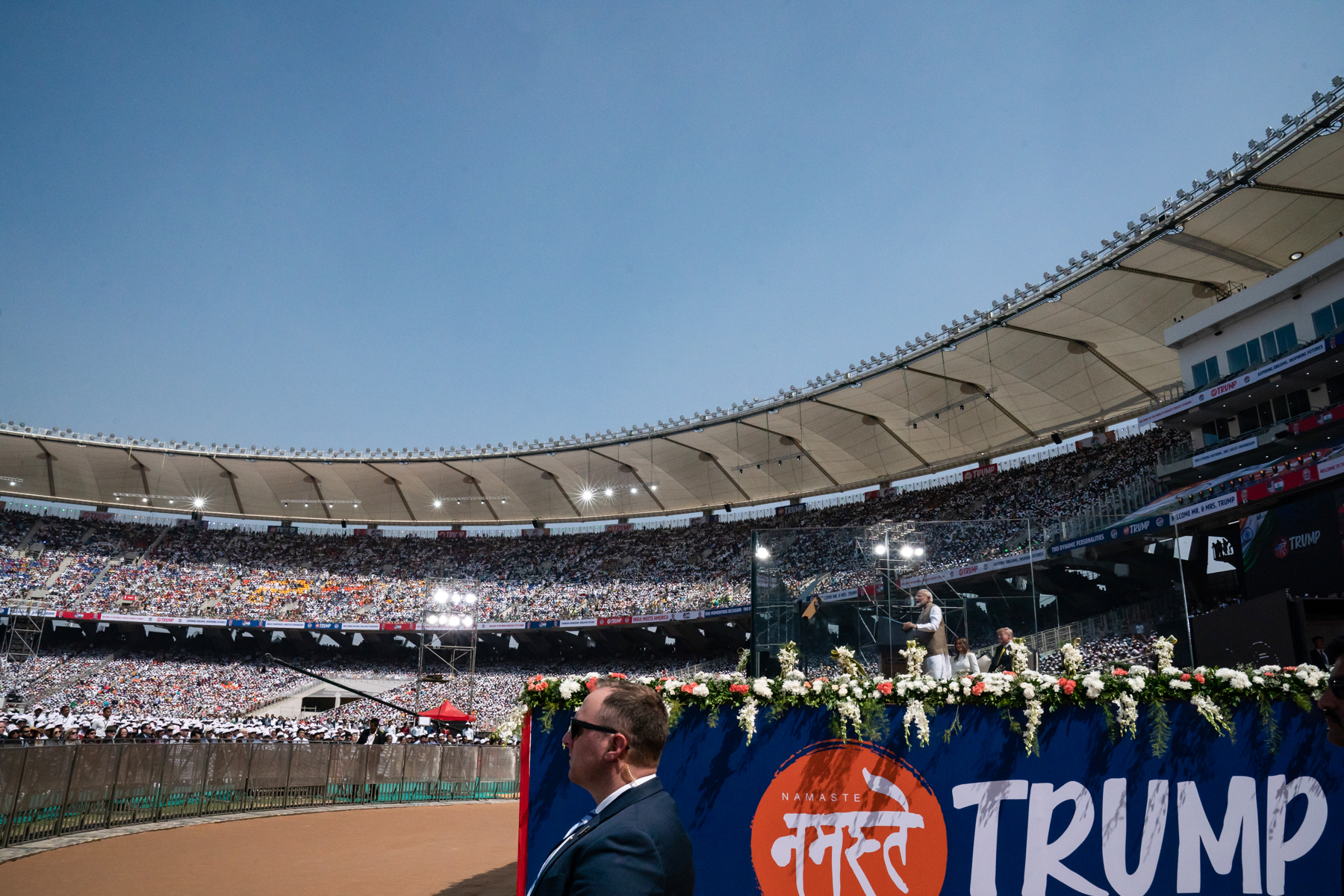
The stadium during the Namaste Trump event.

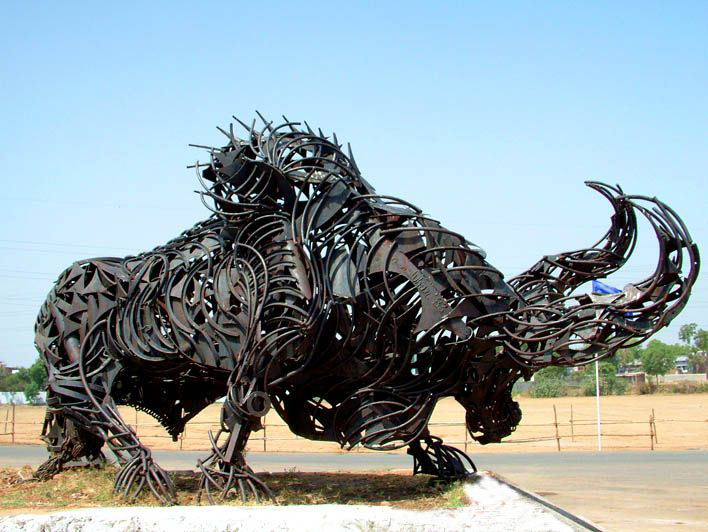
Iron Bull at the stadium entrance.

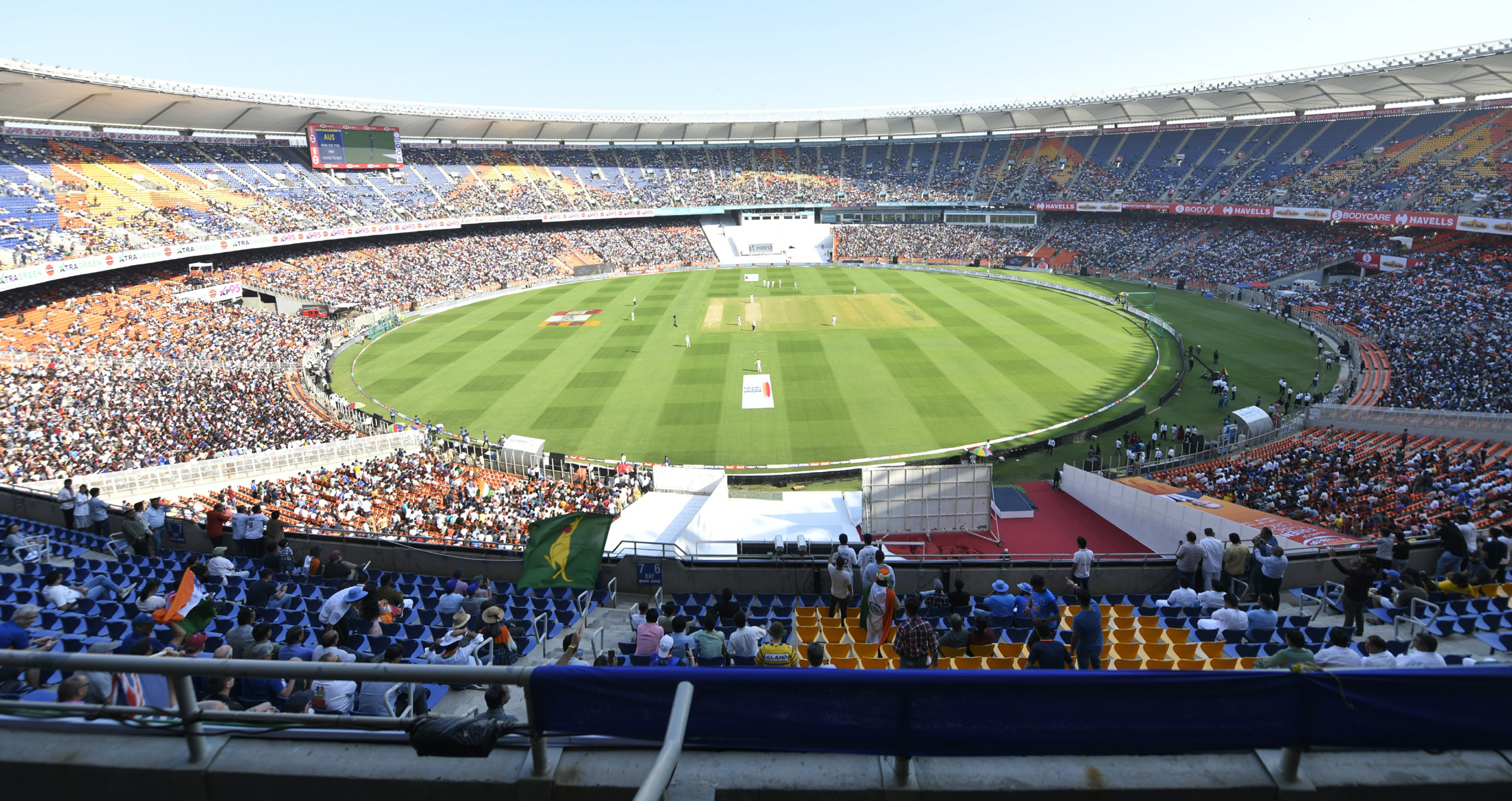
The stadium during the 4th test of the Border Gavaskar Trophy in 2023.

== In media ==
- In 2021, the stadium was featured in an episode of History TV18's documentary show Modern Marvels. The episode depicted the entire construction of the stadium.

== See also ==
- List of cricket grounds by capacity
- List of stadiums in India
- List of international cricket grounds in India
- Cricket in India
- Sport in India
- Sports in Gujarat
- Narendra Modi
- Indian Premier League

== Notes ==
Preceded by Lord's	Cricket World Cup; Final Venue; 2023	Succeeded by TBD
