= 2025 Bengaluru crowd crush =

Crowd crush in Bengaluru, India

- Date: 4 June 2025
- Time: 3:30 pm – 5:30 pm (IST)
- Location: M. Chinnaswamy Stadium, Bengaluru, India
- Type: Crowd crush
- Cause: Overcrowding during celebrations
- Deaths: 11
- Injuries: 56

On 4 June 2025, a crowd crush occurred in Bengaluru, India, during the celebrations of Royal Challengers Bengaluru's maiden Indian Premier League cricket title win. Eleven people were killed and 56 others were injured in the crush, which took place outside the M. Chinnaswamy Stadium, the team's home ground, where a large number of fans had gathered for the team's felicitation event.

== Background ==
On 3 June 2025, Royal Challengers Bengaluru (RCB) won the 2025 Indian Premier League (IPL), defeating the Punjab Kings by 6 runs in the final to secure their first ever IPL title. The RCB team flew to Bengaluru on 4 June, and was honoured on the steps of the Vidhana Soudha by Karnataka chief minister Siddaramaiah, deputy chief minister D. K. Shivakumar and governor Thawar Chand Gehlot between 4 pm and 5 pm. An open top bus victory parade from the Vidhana Soudha to the M. Chinnaswamy Stadium was planned, but cancelled just hours before the event as the Bengaluru Police denied permission citing traffic congestion in the central business district. It was announced that the team would instead proceed directly to the stadium for a felicitation ceremony scheduled to begin at 5 pm.

== Incident ==
Crowds began forming outside the M. Chinnaswamy Stadium by 2 pm and the steady influx of people stalled vehicular traffic on the adjoining streets. An announcement of free passes on the team's official Twitter account at 3:14 pm caused confusion, with many fans arriving without entry passes. After 3:30 pm, a crowd crush occurred across eight entry gates as fans tried to enter the stadium, forcing their way past barricades and scaling fences and walls. Police attempted to control the crowd using a lathi charge.

Emergency services arrived at the scene, and the injured were transported to nearby hospitals. Between 3:45 pm and 5:15 pm, eleven people were confirmed dead on arrival, with six deaths recorded at the state-run Bowring & Lady Curzon Hospitals and five deaths at two other private hospitals. Four deaths occurred near gate 7, two near gate 6, one near gate 1, and four between gates 17 and 21. A total of 56 people were reported injured, including 51 minor, 2 moderate, and 3 serious injuries, who were treated at various hospitals.

The RCB team arrived at the stadium at 5:30 pm; the felicitation ceremony was cut short after reports of casualties started to emerge.

== Investigation ==
The Government of Karnataka ordered an investigation into the incident. According to the government's testimony in a Karnataka High Court hearing, over 1,400 police personnel had been deployed around the stadium and approximately 250,000 fans had gathered on the surrounding streets, including people who had arrived from outside Karnataka. The government admitted that the event was conducted without any standard operating procedure. The police stated that about 50,000 people were present in a 1 km radius of the stadium.

On 5 June, the Bengaluru Police filed a first information report (FIR) against the RCB franchise, event organiser DNA Entertainment, and the stadium operator Karnataka State Cricket Association, alleging that the three entities went ahead with the felicitation ceremony without police permission and in defiance of their instructions. The state government suspended five police officers, including the city commissioner, for failing to ensure adequate crowd control and security arrangements at the venue. On 6 June, Nikhil Sosale, the marketing head of RCB was arrested at Kempegowda International Airport while waiting to board a flight. He was remanded to police custody till 7 June. On 6 June, the Karnataka High Court granted an interim stay on police action against KSCA officials, while Sosale also challenged his arrest in the court. On July 1, 2025, the Central Administrative Tribunal blamed the Royal Challengers Bengaluru (RCB) for the stampede, stating that police permission had not been obtained and that the police were not given sufficient time to make crowd management arrangements.

== Reactions ==
Indian Prime minister Narendra Modi expressed his condolences on social media, mourning the loss of lives and emphasizing the need for improved safety and event management protocols to prevent such tragedies in the future. The chief minister of Karnataka told that excessive crowds resulted in the crush and such crowds were not expected the next day after the match ended late the previous day. State opposition Bharatiya Janata Party demanded a thorough investigation into the management of the event, criticizing the handling of the situation and urging accountability. The government announced a compensation of ₹1 million (US$10,000) for each of the deceased and pledged to cover all medical expenses incurred by those injured during the incident. RCB management also announced a similar compensation for the dead.

== See also ==
- 2025 Liverpool parade incident
- 2025 Paris Saint-Germain celebration riots
- Crowd "stampedes" – Why the term "stampede" is inaccurate and inappropriate.
