= 2022 Indian Premier League final =

Cricket match

- Match programme cover
- Event: 2022 Indian Premier League
Rajasthan Royals	Gujarat Titans
130/9	133/3
20 overs	18.1 overs
- Gujarat Titans won by 7 wickets
- Date: 29 May 2022
- Venue: Narendra Modi Stadium, Ahmedabad
- Player of the match: Hardik Pandya (GT)
- Umpires: Chris Gaffaney (NZ); Nitin Menon (Ind)
- Attendance: 104,859

The 2022 Indian Premier League final was played on 29 May 2022 at the Narendra Modi Stadium in Ahmedabad. It was a Day/Night Twenty20 match, which decided the winner of the 2022 season of the Indian Premier League (IPL), an annual Twenty20 tournament in India. Gujarat Titans, playing their first tournament, won the match and the title by defeating Rajasthan Royals by seven wickets. Captain of the Titans, Hardik Pandya, was also the player of the match.

== Background ==
On 24 February 2022, the BCCI announced the schedule for the 2022 season of the IPL. Four venues were scheduled to host the group stage. The schedule for the playoffs was announced on 3 May. Kolkata was chosen to host qualifier 1 and the eliminator where as the Ahmedabad was chosen to host the qualifier 2 and the final. Gujarat Titans and Rajasthan Royals played the Final on 29 May 2022.

== Road to the final ==
Source: ESPNcricinfo India Today Firstpost

Gujarat Titans			vs	Rajasthan Royals
League Stage
Opponent	Scorecard	Result	Titles	Opponent	Scorecard	Result
Lucknow Super Giants	28 March 2022	Won	Match 1	Sunrisers Hyderabad	29 March 2022	Won
Delhi Capitals	2 April 2022	Won	Match 2	Mumbai Indians	2 April 2022	Won
Punjab Kings	8 April 2022	Won	Match 3	Royal Challengers Bangalore	5 April 2022	Lost
Sunrisers Hyderabad	11 April 2022	Lost	Match 4	Lucknow Super Giants	10 April 2022	Won
Rajasthan Royals	14 April 2022	Won	Match 5	Gujarat Titans	14 April 2022	Lost
Chennai Super Kings	17 April 2022	Won	Match 6	Kolkata Knight Riders	18 April 2022	Won
Kolkata Knight Riders	23 April 2022	Won	Match 7	Delhi Capitals	18 April 2022	Won
Sunrisers Hyderabad	27 April 2022	Won	Match 8	Royal Challengers Bangalore	26 April 2022	Won
Royal Challengers Bangalore	30 April 2022	Won	Match 9	Mumbai Indians	30 April 2022	Lost
Punjab Kings	3 May 2022	Lost	Match 10	Kolkata Knight Riders	2 May 2022	Lost
Mumbai Indians	6 May 2022	Lost	Match 11	Punjab Kings	7 May 2022	Won
Lucknow Super Giants	10 May 2022	Won	Match 12	Delhi Capitals	11 May 2022	Lost
Chennai Super Kings	15 May 2022	Won	Match 13	Lucknow Super Giants	15 May 2022	Won
Royal Challengers Bangalore	19 May 2022	Lost	Match 14	Chennai Super Kings	20 May 2022	Won
Playoff stage
Qualifier 1				Qualifier 1
Opponent	Scorecard	Result	Titles	Opponent	Scorecard	Result
Rajasthan Royals	24 May 2022	Won	Match 15	Gujarat Titans	24 May 2022	Lost
				Qualifier 2
			Titles	Opponent	Scorecard	Result
			Match 16	Royal Challengers Bangalore	27 May 2022	Won
2022 Indian Premier League final

=== Group stage ===
Gujarat Titans started their season with a 5 wicket win over Lucknow Super Giants at the Wankhede Stadium in Mumbai. They went on a three match winning streak until it was broken by Sunrisers Hyderabad. They went on a five match winning streak after that loss but lost three of their last five matches. They ended the group stage with 10 wins and 4 losses, finishing first in the table.

Rajasthan Royals started their season with a 61 run win over Sunrisers Hyderabad at the Maharashtra Cricket Association Stadium in Pune. Their first loss came against Royal Challengers Bangalore, in their third match. They won five of their first seven matches and four of their next seven matches. They ended the group stage with 9 wins and 5 losses. Although they had the same number of points as Lucknow Super Giants, they finished in the second spot as they had a higher net run rate.

=== League stage matches between finalists ===
14 April 2022
19:30 (N)

Gujarat Titans; 192/4 (20 overs)	v	Rajasthan Royals; 155/9 (20 overs)

Gujarat won by 37 runs
DY Patil Stadium, Navi Mumbai
Player of the match: Hardik Pandya (Gujarat)

Gujarat won the only fixture between the two teams by 37 runs on 14 April in Navi Mumbai. Hardik Pandya scored 87* and was the player of the match.

=== Playoffs ===
The playoff stage of IPL was played according to the Page playoff system and provided Gujarat and Rajasthan, being the top and second-ranked teams, with two chances for qualifying for the Final. These teams first faced each other in Qualifier 1, with Gujarat, as the winners, qualifying directly for the final; Rajasthan, as the loser of Qualifier 1, played against the winner of the Eliminator in Qualifier 2, with the winner of that match qualifying for the final.

Qualifier 1
24 May 2022
19:30 (N)

Rajasthan Royals; 188/6 (20 overs)	v	Gujarat Titans; 191/3 (19.3 overs)

Gujarat Titans won by 7 wickets
Eden Gardens, Kolkata
Player of the match: David Miller (Gujarat)

In Qualifier 1, Gujarat won the toss and chose to field. Rajasthan scored 188 in their 20 overs with Jos Buttler top scored for Rajasthan with 89*. Rashid Khan was Gujarat's best bowler, despite not taking a wicket, he bowled four overs at an economy of 3.75. Mohammed Shami, Yash Dayal, R Sai Kishore and Hardik Pandya took a wicket each for Gujarat. In reply, Gujarat chased the total down with three balls to spare. David Miller top scored with 68* and was awarded player of the match. As a result, Gujarat qualified for the final.

The Royal Challengers Bangalore won against Lucknow Super Giants in the Eliminator to set up a match against Rajasthan to decide the second finalist.

Qualifier 2
27 May 2022
19:30 (N)

Royal Challengers Bangalore; 157/8 (20 overs)	v	Rajasthan Royals; 161/3 (18.1 overs)

Rajasthan Royals won by 7 wickets
Narendra Modi Stadium, Ahmedabad
Player of the match: Jos Buttler (Rajasthan Royals)

In Qualifier 2, Rajasthan won the toss and chose to field. Bangalore scored 157/8 in their 20 overs. Rajat Patidar top scored for them with 58 while Prasidh Krishna was the best bowler for Rajasthan with 3/22. In reply, Rajasthan chased the target in 18.1 overs, with Jos Buttler scoring a century. Rajasthan qualified for their first final since 2008, and their second final overall.

== Match ==
=== Match officials ===
- On-field umpires: Chris Gaffaney (NZ) and Nitin Menon (Ind)
- Third umpire: K. N. Ananthapadmanabhan (Ind)
- Reserve umpire: Anil Chaudhary (Ind)
- Match referee: Javagal Srinath (Ind)
- Toss: Rajasthan Royals won the toss and elected to bat.

=== Summary ===
Sanju Samson of the Rajasthan Royals won the toss and elected to bat to put the opposition Gujarat Titans to field. Rajasthan Royals scored a total of 130 runs for a loss of 9 wickets in their 20 overs. Chasing 131, the Gujarat Titans scored 133 runs for a loss of 3 wickets in just 18.1 overs, winning the match and the Indian Premier League title in their inaugural tournament. Titans captain Hardik Pandya was the player of the match having taken three wickets while conceding 17 runs in his four overs, and following it with a knock of 34 runs in 30 balls.

==== Rajasthan Royals innings ====
Batting first, the Rajasthan Royals had Indian batsman Yashasvi Jaiswal and England batsman Jos Buttler opened the innings. The two got off to relatively slow start with Jaiswal taking eight deliveries to get off the mark while Butler ended the power play scoring 10 runs from the 14 balls that he faced. Jaiswal was the first to depart when he was dismissed of the last ball of the fourth over, caught at deep square leg by Sai Kishore off the bowling of Yash Dayal having scored 22 runs from 16 balls. Captain Sanju Samson attempted to accelerate the scoring two boundaries off the very first three deliveries before being out caught by Kishore at backward point off the bowling of Hardik Pandya, with the score reading 60 for the loss of two wickets from 8.2 overs. Pandya continued to keep the pressure forcing incoming batsman Devdutt Padikkal to remain scoreless against him across seven deliveries. Padikkal eventually was out to Rashid Khan, caught again at backward point. Butler followed by losing his wicket to Pandya, caught by the wicketkeeper Wriddhiman Saha. Pandya followed it up with the wicket of Shimron Hetmyer, catching off his own bowling, with the West Indian being out for 11 from 12 deliveries. Royals ended their 20 overs scoring 130 runs for the loss of 9 wickets. Pandya was the pick of the bowlers having taken 3 wickets while conceding 17 runs in his four overs. Kishore claimed two wickets in the two overs that he bowled while conceding 20 runs, taking the wickets of Ravichandran Ashwin and Trent Boult.

==== Gujarat Titans innings ====
Indian batsmen Wriddhiman Saha and Shubman Gill opened the innings for the Titans. The pair was broken early in the second over when Saha was out bowled by pacer Prasidh Krishna having scored 5 runs from 7 balls. New Zealand fast bowler Trent followed it up by dismissing Australian batsman Matthew Wade, out caught by Riyan Parag. The score was 23 runs for the loss of two wickets, bringing the captain Pandya to the crease. Pandya and Gill put on a healthy partnership of 63 runs effectively ensuring that Titans were out of a spot of bother. Pandya was out in the 14th over caught by Jaiswal off the bowling of Indian spinner Yuzvendra Chahal. Gill went on to see the team through by scoring 45 runs from 43 balls. South African batsman David Miller chipped in scoring 32 runs from 19 deliveries ensuring that the Titans scored 133 runs for the loss of 3 wickets, winning the match by 7 wickets with 11 deliveries to spare. Pandya was the player of the match.

29 May 2022
20:00 (N)
Scorecard

Rajasthan Royals; 130/9 (20 overs)	v	Gujarat Titans; 133/3 (18.1 overs)
Jos Buttler 39 (35); Hardik Pandya 3/17 (4 overs)		Shubman Gill 45* (43); Trent Boult 1/14 (4 overs)

Gujarat Titans won by 7 wickets
Narendra Modi Stadium, Ahmedabad
Umpires: Chris Gaffaney (NZ) and Nitin Menon (Ind)
Player of the match: Hardik Pandya (Gujarat Titans)

- Rajasthan Royals won the toss and elected to bat.

=== Scorecard ===
Rajasthan Royals innings
Batsman	Method of dismissal	Runs	Balls	Strike rate
Yashasvi Jaiswal	c Ravisrinivasan Sai Kishore b Yash Dayal	22	16	137.50
Jos Buttler	c Wriddhiman Saha b Hardik Pandya	39	35	111.43
Sanju Samson	c Ravisrinivasan Sai Kishore b Hardik Pandya	14	11	127.27
Devdutt Padikkal	c Mohammed Shami b Rashid Khan	2	10	20.00
Shimron Hetmyer	c and b Hardik Pandya	11	12	91.67
Ravichandran Ashwin	c David Miller b Ravisrinivasan Sai Kishore	6	9	66.67
Riyan Parag	b Mohammed Shami	15	15	100.00
Trent Boult	c Rahul Tewatia b Ravisrinivasan Sai Kishore	11	7	157.14
Obed McCoy	run out Rahul Tewatia	8	5	160.00
Prasidh Krishna	not out	0	–	–
Yuzvendra Chahal	Did not bat			
Extras	(0 b, 2lb, 0nb, 0wd)	2		
Totals	(20 overs, 6.50 runs per over)	130/9		

Gujarat Titans bowling
Bowler	Overs	Maidens	Runs	Wickets	Economy
Mohammed Shami	4	0	33	1	8.25
Yash Dayal	3	0	18	1	6.00
Lockie Ferguson	3	0	22	0	7.33
Rashid Khan	4	0	18	1	4.50
Hardik Pandya	4	0	17	3	4.25
R. Sai Kishore	2	0	20	2	10.00

Fall of wickets: 31/1 (Y. Jaiswal, 3.6 ov), 60/2 (S. Samson, 8.2 ov), 79/3 (D. Padikkal, 11.5 ov), 79/4 (J. Buttler, 12.1 ov), 94/5 (S. Hetmyer, 14.6 ov), 98/6 (R. Ashwin, 15.5 ov), 112/7 (T. Boult, 17.3 ov), 130/8 (O. McCoy, 19.4 ov), 130//9 (R. Parag, 20 ov)

Gujarat Titans innings
Batsman	Method of dismissal	Runs	Balls	Strike rate
Wriddhiman Saha	b Prasidh Krishna	5	7	71.43
Shubman Gill	not out	45	43	104.65
Matthew Wade	c Riyan Parag b Trent Boult	8	10	80.00
Hardik Pandya	c Yashasvi Jaiswal b Yuzvendra Chahal	34	30	113.33
David Miller	not out	32	19	168.42
Rahul Tewatia	Did not bat			
Rashid Khan	Did not bat			
R. Sai Kishore	Did not bat			
Lockie Ferguson	Did not bat			
Mohammed Shami	Did not bat			
Yash Dayal	Did not bat			
Extras	(0 b, 1lb, 0nb, 7wd)	8		
Totals	(18.1 overs)	133/3		

Rajasthan Royals bowling
Bowler	Overs	Maidens	Runs	Wickets	Economy
Trent Boult	4	1	14	1	3.50
Prasidh Krishna	4	0	40	1	10.00
Yuzvendra Chahal	4	0	20	1	5.00
Obed McCoy	3.1	0	26	0	8.21
Ravichandran Ashwin	3	0	32	0	10.67

Fall of wickets: 9/1 (W. Saha, 1.4 ov), 23/2 (M. Wade, 4.3 ov), 86/3 (H. Pandya, 13.2 ov)
