= Suyash Sharma =

Indian cricketer (born 2003)

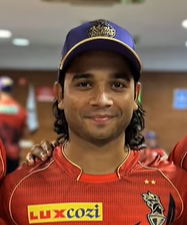
- Sharma in 2024

Personal information
- Born: 15 May 2003 (age 23); Bhajanpura, North East Delhi, India
- Batting: Right-handed
- Bowling: Right-arm leg-break
- Role: Bowler

Domestic team information
- Years: Team
- 2023–present: Delhi
- 2023–2024: Kolkata Knight Riders
- 2025-present: Royal Challengers Bangalore

Career statistics
Competition	LA	T20
Matches	4	53
Runs scored	0	7
Batting average	–	–
100s/50s	0/0	0/0
Top score	0*	6*
Balls bowled	217	1162
Wickets	10	57
Bowling average	14.50	26.10
5 wickets in innings	0	1
10 wickets in match	–	–
Best bowling	4/25	5/13
Catches/stumpings	0/–	7/–
- Source: ESPNcricinfo, 29 March 2026

Suyash Sharma (born 15 May 2003) is an Indian cricketer, who is a leg spin bowler. He plays for Delhi cricket team in domestic cricket and Royal Challengers Bengaluru in the Indian Premier League (IPL).

== Early life ==
Sharma hails from Bhajanpura in North East Delhi. He developed his bowling action under the guidance of his childhood coach Suresh Batra. He initially used to play cricket at Madras Club and DDCA club-cricket competitions.

== Career ==
In December 2022, Sharma was bought by the Kolkata Knight Riders at a price of ₹20 lakhs to play for them in the Indian Premier League. He made his Twenty20 debut on 6 April 2023, against Royal Challengers Bengaluru in the 2023 Indian Premier League. The leg spinner impressed on his debut match, picking up three wickets guiding his team to an 81-run victory. His bowling figures of 3 for 30 were also the second best for a spinner on IPL debut. On 17 October 2023, he made his debut for Delhi and took his maiden T20 five-wicket haul against Madhya Pradesh in the 2023–24 Syed Mushtaq Ali Trophy. He made his List A debut for Delhi on 23 November 2023, against Bihar in the 2022–23 Vijay Hazare Trophy.

In the 2025 IPL auction, Suyash was picked by RCB for 2.6 crores. He was a part of the team that had won the 2025 IPL title.
