= Krunal Pandya =

Indian cricketer (born 1991)

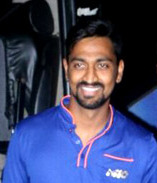

Personal information
- Full name: Krunal Himanshu Pandya
- Born: 24 March 1991 (age 35); Ahmedabad, Gujarat, India
- Batting: Left-handed
- Bowling: Slow left arm orthodox
- Role: All-rounder
- Relatives: Hardik Pandya (brother)

International information
- National side: India (2018–2021)
- ODI debut (cap 233): 23 March 2021 v England
- Last ODI: 23 July 2021 v Sri Lanka
- ODI shirt no.: 36
- T20I debut (cap 78): 4 November 2018 v West Indies
- Last T20I: 25 July 2021 v Sri Lanka
- T20I shirt no.: 36

Domestic team information
- Years: Team
- 2012/13–present: Baroda
- 2016–2021: Mumbai Indians (squad no. 24)
- 2022–2024: Lucknow Super Giants
- 2022: Warwickshire
- 2025–present: Royal Challengers Bengaluru

Career statistics
Competition	ODI	T20I	LA	T20
Matches	5	19	96	228
Runs scored	130	124	2,953	3,017
Batting average	65.00	24.80	38.85	23.57
100s/50s	0/1	0/0	3/17	0/9
Top score	58*	26*	133*	86
Balls bowled	228	410	4,457	4,114
Wickets	2	15	115	165
Bowling average	111.50	36.93	32.00	30.56
5 wickets in innings	0	0	2	0
10 wickets in match	0	0	0	0
Best bowling	1/26	4/36	6/41	4/15
Catches/stumpings	1/–	8/–	27/–	85/–
- Source: ESPNcricinfo, 3 January 2026

Krunal Himanshu Pandya (born 24 March 1991) is an Indian cricketer who plays for Baroda in domestic cricket and Royal Challengers Bengaluru in the Indian Premier League (IPL). He is an all-rounder who bats left-handed and bowls slow left-arm orthodox. He made his T20I debut for India in November 2018. In 2021, he scored the fastest half-century by a cricketer on ODI debut. He also formerly captained the Lucknow Super Giants in the IPL. He is the elder brother of cricketer Hardik Pandya.

== Domestic career ==
Pandya made his first-class debut on 6 October 2016, playing for Baroda during the 2016–17 Ranji Trophy tournament. Within the next few months, he became the leading run scorer and leading wicket taker for Baroda in 2016-17 Vijay Hazare Trophy. He scored 366 runs in 8 matches at an average of 45.75 and strike rate of 81.33. This included three half centuries, with his highest score being 78. In bowling, he took 11 wickets in 8 matches with economy rate of 4.82, at an average of 25.09 and strike rate of 31.10. His best bowling score during the eight matches was 4 for 20.

In 2017, he featured in an India A tri-series victory over South Africa A and Afghanistan A. In October 2018, he was named in India A's squad for the 2018–19 Deodhar Trophy.

Pandya scored 160 and 104 and returned bowling figures of 4/40 and 2/19 in a match against Railways in the 2018–19 Ranji Trophy. He was named as the captain of Baroda for the 2019–20 Vijay Hazare Trophy.

He played for the Warwickshire County Cricket Club in the 2022 Royal London One-Day Cup.

== Indian Premier League ==
At the 2016 IPL auction, Mumbai Indians purchased Pandya for ₹2 crore. He made his IPL debut in April 2016, playing against Gujarat Lions at Wankhede Stadium, Mumbai.

In 2017, he scored 86 from 37 balls and took the wickets of Quinton De Kock and Zaheer Khan and was adjudged to be the Player of the Match against Delhi Daredevils at ACA-VDCA Stadium, Visakhapatnam. He continued to produce consistent performances with the bat and ball throughout the tournament. He was named the Player of the Match for scoring 47 in a final against Rising Pune Supergiant.

In January 2018, Pandya was signed up by the Mumbai Indians in the 2018 IPL auction.

In the 2022 IPL auction, Pandya was signed up by the Lucknow Super Giants for ₹8.25 crore.

In the 2025 IPL auction, Pandya was signed up by the Royal Challengers Bengaluru for ₹5.75 crore. He picked up 17 wickets and scored 109 runs in that season and also won the Player of the Match award in the final for his great bowling performance against Punjab Kings. Thus, he became the first player in history to win two Player of the final award in IPL history.

== International career ==
In October 2018, Pandya was named in India's Twenty20 International (T20I) squads for their tours against the West Indies and Australia. He made his T20I debut for India against the West Indies on 4 November 2018, taking one wicket and scoring an unbeaten 21 runs off nine balls. He was selected for India Twenty20 International team against Australia and played all three matches. In the first match he conceded 55 runs in four overs, but took 1/26 in the second T20I and won the Player of the Match award in the third match for his bowling performance of 4/36 in 4 overs.

In March 2021, he was named in India's One Day International (ODI) squad for their series against England. He made his ODI debut for India on 23 March 2021, against England, scoring 58 not out. His fifty was the fastest on debut in an ODI match, coming from 26 balls.

== Personal life ==
He is the elder brother of fellow Indian cricketer Hardik Pandya. On 27 December 2017, he married Pankhuri Sharma. The couple have two sons, Kavir Krunal Pandya, born on 18 July 2022 and Vayu Krunal Pandya, born on 21 April 2024.

In January 2021, Indian cricketer Deepak Hooda wrote a scathing letter addressed to the Baroda Cricket Association accusing Pandya of using ‘abusive language’ and ‘threats to end his career’ and Hooda pulled himself out of the Syed Mushtaq Ali Trophy 2021.

On 27 July 2021, he tested positive for COVID-19.

In January 2022, Pandya's Twitter account was hacked, and suspicious tweets were posted from an alleged Bitcoin scammer. Later in the day, all those tweets were deleted and Pandya posted a tweet apologising.
