= Yash Dayal =

Indian cricketer (born 1997)

Personal information
- Born: 13 December 1997 (age 28); Prayagraj, Uttar Pradesh, India
- Height: 1.87 m (6 ft 2 in)
- Batting: Right-handed
- Bowling: Left arm fast-medium
- Role: Bowler

Domestic team information
- Years: Team
- 2018–present: Uttar Pradesh
- 2022–2023: Gujarat Titans
- 2024–2025: Royal Challengers Bengaluru

Career statistics
Competition	FC	LA	T20
Matches	27	23	60
Runs scored	336	54	10
Batting average	18.66	13.50	5.00
100s/50s	0/1	0/0	0/0
Top score	55	17	4*
Balls bowled	4,831	1,116	1,184
Wickets	84	36	58
Bowling average	28.78	23.86	28.79
5 wickets in innings	1	1	0
10 wickets in match	0	0	0
Best bowling	5/48	5/31	3/20
Catches/stumpings	8/–	5/–	7/–
- Source: ESPNcricinfo, 27 March 2025

Yash Dayal (born 13 December 1997) is an Indian cricketer who represents Uttar Pradesh in domestic cricket and Royal Challengers Bengaluru in Indian Premier League. He is a left arm fast-medium bowler.

== Career ==
He made his List A debut for Uttar Pradesh in the 2018–19 Vijay Hazare Trophy on 21 September 2018. He made his first-class debut for Uttar Pradesh in the 2018–19 Ranji Trophy on 1 November 2018. He made his Twenty20 debut for Uttar Pradesh in the 2018–19 Syed Mushtaq Ali Trophy on 21 February 2019.

In February 2022, he was bought by the Gujarat Titans in the auction for the 2022 Indian Premier League tournament for a whopping 3.2 crores in the auction, which was a considerably higher bid for an uncapped player. He made his IPL debut on 13 April 2022, against Rajasthan Royals. However, his rise to fame came in a negative limelight as he couldn't defend 29 runs in the final over the IPL league match against Kolkata Knight Riders in the 2023 season with Rinku Singh smacking him for 5 sixes in that over. He had one of worst four-over spells in IPL history in that game, giving away 69 runs, only one run short of the worst spell at that time. He was released by Gujarat Titans after the season.

In the 2024 auction, he was picked by Royal Challengers Bengaluru with an even bigger bid of 5 crores. He made a spectacular comeback in that season, scalping 15 wickets from 13 matches with best bowling figures of 3/20 against Delhi Capitals. However, the turning point of his IPL career was defending 17 runs against the Chennai Super Kings in the last over, which also included the massive wicket of MS Dhoni and helped RCB qualify for the playoffs.

He received his maiden call-up to the Indian national team for the Test Series against Bangladesh during September–October 2024.

In July 2025, Dayal was charged by the Jaipur police following an allegation of raping a minor under the POCSO Act, and was eventually banned from playing in the Indian Premier League 2026.
