= 2019–20 Vijay Hazare Trophy Group C =

Cricket tournament

- Dates: 24 September – 16 October 2019
- Administrator: BCCI
- Cricket format: List A cricket
- Tournament format: Round-robin
- Participants: 10

The 2019–20 Vijay Hazare Trophy is the 18th season of the Vijay Hazare Trophy, a List A cricket tournament in India. It is being contested by 38 teams, divided into four groups, with ten teams in Group C. The group stage started on 24 September 2019. The top two teams in Group C progressed to the quarter-finals of the competition.

Seventeen out of the first thirty matches that were scheduled to be played across all four groups were abandoned or finished in a no result. Therefore, the Board of Control for Cricket in India (BCCI) issued a revised schedule for the rain-affected matches.

Following the conclusion of matches played on 10 October 2019, Gujarat and Tamil Nadu, were the first two teams to qualify for the knockout stage of the tournament.

== Points table ==
Pos	Team	Pld	W	L	T	NR	Pts	NRR
1	Tamil Nadu	9	9	0	0	0	36	1.869
2	Gujarat	9	8	1	0	0	32	1.246
3	Bengal	9	5	2	1	1	24	0.196
4	Services	9	5	4	0	0	20	−0.339
5	Tripura	9	4	5	0	0	16	−0.279
6	Jammu & Kashmir	9	4	5	0	0	16	−0.427
7	Madhya Pradesh	9	3	5	0	1	14	−0.369
8	Railways	9	2	5	2	0	12	−0.280
9	Rajasthan	9	2	6	1	0	10	−0.099
10	Bihar	9	0	9	0	0	0	−1.706

- Top two teams advances to the knockout stage and are promoted to the Elite Group A and B.
- Bottom ranked team is relegated to the Plate Group for the next season.

== Fixtures ==
=== Round 1 ===
24 September 2019
Scorecard

Rajasthan; 261/9 (50 overs)	v	Tamil Nadu; 262/4 (48 overs)
Arjit Gupta 77 (82); Krishnamoorthy Vignesh 3/34 (10 overs)		Abhinav Mukund 75 (83); Abhimanyu Lamba 1/41 (8.5 overs)

Tamil Nadu won by 6 wickets
Sawai Mansingh Stadium, Jaipur
Umpires: Sanjay Kumar Singh and Navdeep Singh

- Tamil Nadu won the toss and elected to field.
- Chezhian Harinishanth (Tamil Nadu) made his List A debut.

24 September 2019
Scorecard

Jammu & Kashmir; 197 (43.2 overs)	v	Tripura; 198/8 (44.1 overs)
Qamran Iqbal 43 (44); Harmeet Singh 3/32 (10 overs)		Milind Kumar 77 (69); Umar Nazir 3/45 (8 overs)

Tripura won by 2 wickets
KL Saini Ground, Jaipur
Umpires: Saiyed Khalid and C. K. Nandan

- Tripura won the toss and elected to field.
- Qamran Iqbal (Jammu & Kashmir) made his List A debut.

24 September 2019
Scorecard

Gujarat; 253/8 (50 overs)	v	Bengal; 215 (46.2 overs)
Bhargav Merai 63 (93); Ashok Dinda 3/58 (9 overs)		Shreevats Goswami 79 (112); Roosh Kalaria 4/34 (8.2 overs)

Gujarat won by 38 runs
Jaipuriya Vidhyalaya Ground, Jaipur
Umpires: Mukund Mandale and Puttarangaiah Jayapal

- Bengal won the toss and elected to field.
- Manan Hingrajia, Ripal Patel (Gujarat) and Akash Deep (Bengal) all made their List A debuts.

=== Round 2 ===
25 September 2019
Scorecard

Tamil Nadu; 294/8 (50 overs)	v	Services; 82 (19.1 overs)
Dinesh Karthik 95 (91); Rajat Paliwal 2/26 (4 overs)		Nakul Verma 20 (25); Krishnamoorthy Vignesh 5/41 (9.1 overs)

Tamil Nadu won by 212 runs
Sawai Mansingh Stadium, Jaipur
Umpires: Navdeep Singh and C. K. Nandan

- Services won the toss and elected to field.
- Pulkit Narang (Services) made his List A debut.

25 September 2019
Scorecard

Tripura; 268/8 (50 overs)	v	Madhya Pradesh; 86/6 (26 overs)
Tanmay Mishra 102 (101); Ishwar Pandey 2/41 (10 overs)		Rajat Patidar 41 (64); Pratyush Singh 1/6 (2 overs)

Tripura won by 104 runs (VJD method)
Jaipuriya Vidhyalaya Ground, Jaipur
Umpires: Mukund Mandale and Saiyed Khalid

- Madhya Pradesh won the toss and elected to field.
- Kuldeep Sen (Madhya Pradesh) made his List A debut.

25 September 2019
Scorecard

Railways; 289/6 (50 overs)	v	Bihar; 155/6 (43 overs)
Arindam Ghosh 96 (102); Vivek Kumar 3/55 (9 overs)		Shasheem Rathour 86* (124); Karn Sharma 3/23 (9 overs)

Railways won by 84 runs (VJD method)
KL Saini Ground, Jaipur
Umpires: Sanjay Kumar Singh and Puttarangaiah Jayapal

- Bihar won the toss and elected to field.
- Kamlesh Kumar, Sachin Kumar, Vivek Kumar, Rohan Kumar (Bihar), Mangal Mahrour, Ashish Sehrawat, Vikrant Rajput, Amit Kuila and Dinesh Mor (Railways) all made their List A debuts.

=== Round 3 ===
27 September 2019
Scorecard

Jammu & Kashmir; 317/5 (50 overs)	v	Rajasthan; 262 (49 overs)
Shubham Pundir 96* (90); Rahul Chahar 2/50 (9 overs)		Mahipal Lomror 88 (92); Ram Dayal 4/45 (10 overs)

Jammu & Kashmir won by 55 runs
Sawai Mansingh Stadium, Jaipur
Umpires: Mukund Mandale and C. K. Nandan

- Rajasthan won the toss and elected to field.
- Abid Mushtaq, Abdul Samad (Jammu & Kashmir) and Ravi Bishnoi (Rajasthan) all made their List A debuts.

27 September 2019
Scorecard

Railways; 108 (32.1 overs)	v	Madhya Pradesh; 109/7 (24.1 overs)
Karn Sharma 25 (22); Gaurav Yadav 5/45 (10 overs)		Naman Ojha 60* (71); T Pradeep 4/42 (9 overs)

Madhya Pradesh won by 3 wickets
Jaipuriya Vidhyalaya Ground, Jaipur
Umpires: Sanjay Kumar Singh and Saiyed Khalid

- Madhya Pradesh won the toss and elected to field.
- Rahul Batham (Madhya Pradesh) and Himanshu Sangwan (Railways) both made their List A debuts.

27 September 2019
Scorecard

Services; 241/9 (50 overs)	v	Tripura; 222 (47.3 overs)
Ravi Chauhan 104 (139); Ajoy Sarkar 5/37 (10 overs)		Tanmay Mishra 57 (63); Varun Choudhary 3/40 (9.3 overs)

Services won by 19 runs
KL Saini Ground, Jaipur
Umpires: Puttarangaiah Jayapal and Navdeep Singh

- Services won the toss and elected to bat.
- Mohit Ahlawat (Services) made his List A debut.

=== Round 4 ===
28 September 2019
Scorecard

Gujarat; 281/9 (50 overs)	v	Madhya Pradesh; 246 (50 overs)
Parthiv Patel 90 (96); Ishwar Pandey 4/46 (10 overs)		Rajat Patidar 71 (74); Arzan Nagwaswalla 3/50 (10 overs)

Gujarat won by 35 runs
Sawai Mansingh Stadium, Jaipur
Umpires: Saiyed Khalid and Navdeep Singh

- Gujarat won the toss and elected to bat.

28 September 2019
Scorecard

Services; 276/7 (50 overs)	v	Bengal; 277/6 (49.4 overs)
Nakul Verma 52 (80); Arnab Nandi 2/33 (8 overs)		Abhishek Raman 106 (117); Pulkit Narang 2/52 (10 overs)

Bengal won by 4 wickets
KL Saini Ground, Jaipur
Umpires: Sanjay Kumar Singh and Puttarangaiah Jayapal

- Bengal won the toss and elected to field.

28 September 2019
Scorecard

Bihar; 217/7 (50 overs)	v	Tamil Nadu; 218/3 (46.5 overs)
Babul Kumar 110 (136); M. Mohammed 3/33 (8 overs)		Vijay Shankar 91* (88); Sachin Singh 2/36 (8 overs)

Tamil Nadu won by 7 wickets
Jaipuriya Vidhyalaya Ground, Jaipur
Umpires: Mukund Mandale and C. K. Nandan

- Bihar won the toss and elected to bat.
- Kumar Aditya (Bihar) made his List A debut.

=== Round 5 ===
30 September 2019
Scorecard

Bihar; 137 (40.4 overs)	v	Madhya Pradesh; 138/3 (27.4 overs)
Ashutosh Aman 25 (47); Mihir Hirwani 4/29 (8.4 overs)		Rajat Patidar 48 (48); Vivek Kumar 1/25 (6 overs)

Madhya Pradesh won by 7 wickets
KL Saini Ground, Jaipur
Umpires: Sanjay Kumar Singh and C. K. Nandan

- Madhya Pradesh won the toss and elected to field.
- Nikku Singh (Bihar) and Rishabh Chouhan (Madhya Pradesh) both made their List A debuts.

30 September 2019
Scorecard

Gujarat; 305 (50 overs)	v	Tripura; 204/8 (50 overs)
Bhargav Merai 125 (135); Ajoy Sarkar 3/68 (10 overs)		Milind Kumar 103* (126); Chintan Gaja 2/17 (6 overs)

Gujarat won by 101 runs
Sawai Mansingh Stadium, Jaipur
Umpires: Mukund Mandale and Puttarangaiah Jayapal

- Tripura won the toss and elected to field.

30 September 2019
Scorecard

Jammu & Kashmir; 169 (48.2 overs)	v	Bengal; 175/2 (28 overs)
Ram Dayal 57* (94); Ishan Porel 3/64 (10 overs)		Shreevats Goswami 86* (80); Ram Dayal 2/40 (9 overs)

Bengal won by 8 wickets
Jaipuriya Vidhyalaya Ground, Jaipur
Umpires: Saiyed Khalid and Navdeep Singh

- Jammu & Kashmir won the toss and elected to bat.

=== Round 6 ===
1 October 2019
Scorecard

Railways; 251/6 (50 overs)	v	Services; 252/5 (48.5 overs)
Arindam Ghosh 79 (107); Varun Choudhary 3/58 (10 overs)		Nakul Verma 108 (124); Vikrant Rajput 2/47 (8 overs)

Services won by 5 wickets
KL Saini Ground, Jaipur
Umpires: Navdeep Singh and C. K. Nandan

- Railways won the toss and elected to bat.

1 October 2019
Scorecard

Rajasthan; 102 (40.1 overs)	v	Gujarat; 103/3 (25.3 overs)
Manender Singh 35 (72); Roosh Kalaria 3/15 (7 overs)		Dhruv Raval 34* (57); Khaleel Ahmed 1/15 (6 overs)

Gujarat won by 7 wickets
Sawai Mansingh Stadium, Jaipur
Umpires: Mukund Mandale and Puttarangaiah Jayapal

- Gujarat won the toss and elected to field.

1 October 2019
Scorecard

Tamil Nadu; 286/7 (50 overs)	v	Bengal; 212 (45.3 overs)
Dinesh Karthik 97 (62); Ashok Dinda 2/60 (10 overs)		Shahbaz Ahmed 107 (131); Krishnamoorthy Vignesh 2/33 (8 overs)

Tamil Nadu won by 74 runs
Jaipuriya Vidhyalaya Ground, Jaipur
Umpires: Sanjay Kumar Singh and Saiyed Khalid

- Bengal won the toss and elected to field.

=== Round 7 ===
3 October 2019
Scorecard

Railways; 285/6 (50 overs)	v	Jammu & Kashmir; 287/6 (49.1 overs)
Dinesh Mor 70 (64); Umar Nazir 3/53 (10 overs)		Parvez Rasool 118* (112); Himanshu Sangwan 3/66 (9 overs)

Jammu & Kashmir won by 4 wickets
KL Saini Ground, Jaipur
Umpires: Saiyed Khalid and Navdeep Singh

- Jammu & Kashmir won the toss and elected to field.
- Mujtaba Yousuf (Jammu & Kashmir) made his List A debut.

3 October 2019
Scorecard

Bihar; 126 (42.2 overs)	v	Gujarat; 128/3 (19.1 overs)
Sachin Kumar 44* (73); Tejas Patel 2/19 (7 overs)		Priyank Panchal 40 (28); Ashutosh Aman 1/24 (5 overs)

Gujarat won by 7 wickets
Jaipuriya Vidhyalaya Ground, Jaipur
Umpires: Mukund Mandale and C. K. Nandan

- Bihar won the toss and elected to bat.
- Tejas Patel (Gujarat) made his List A debut.

3 October 2019
Scorecard

Rajasthan; 265/4 (50 overs)	v	Bengal; 266/5 (49 overs)
Mahipal Lomror 79 (100); Arnab Nandi 2/32 (10 overs)		Abhishek Raman 122* (108); Ravi Bishnoi 3/49 (10 overs)

Bengal won by 5 wickets
Sawai Mansingh Stadium, Jaipur
Umpires: Sanjay Kumar Singh and Puttarangaiah Jayapal

- Bengal won the toss and elected to field.

=== Round 8 ===
4 October 2019
Scorecard

Madhya Pradesh; 282/7 (50 overs)	v	Services; 283/3 (47 overs)
Naman Ojha 130 (144); Diwesh Pathania 4/50 (10 overs)		Ravi Chauhan 118 (135); Ishwar Pandey 1/43 (10 overs)

Services won by 7 wickets
Sawai Mansingh Stadium, Jaipur
Umpires: Navdeep Singh and C. K. Nandan

- Madhya Pradesh won the toss and elected to bat.
- Abhishek Bhandari (Madhya Pradesh) made his List A debut.

4 October 2019
Scorecard

Jammu & Kashmir; 238/9 (50 overs)	v	Tamil Nadu; 239/2 (48 overs)
Qamran Iqbal 67 (87); Sai Kishore 2/17 (10 overs)		Murali Vijay 117 (131); Parvez Rasool 1/39 (10 overs)

Tamil Nadu won by 8 wickets
KL Saini Ground, Jaipur
Umpires: Mukund Mandale and Sanjay Kumar Singh

- Tamil Nadu won the toss and elected to field.

4 October 2019
Scorecard

Tripura; 285/8 (50 overs)	v	Rajasthan; 238 (47 overs)
Bishal Ghosh 128 (129); Ravi Bishnoi 2/47 (8 overs)		Mahipal Lomror 71 (86); Ajoy Sarkar 3/58 (10 overs)

Tripura won by 47 runs
Jaipuriya Vidhyalaya Ground, Jaipur
Umpires: Saiyed Khalid and Puttarangaiah Jayapal

- Rajasthan won the toss and elected to field.

=== Round 9 ===
6 October 2019
Scorecard

Rajasthan; 206 (47.4 overs)	v	Railways; 206/8 (50 overs)
Arjit Gupta 90 (104); Himanshu Sangwan 4/44 (9.4 overs)		Dinesh Mor 92* (108); Abhimanyu Lamba 4/15 (10 overs)

Match tied
Jaipuriya Vidhyalaya Ground, Jaipur
Umpires: Pashchim Pathak and Nand Kishore

- Rajasthan won the toss and elected to bat.
- Ananta Saha (Railways) made his List A debut.

6 October 2019
Scorecard

Jammu & Kashmir; 189 (48.3 overs)	v	Services; 190/3 (34.2 overs)
Paras Sharma 49 (79); Diwesh Pathania 4/39 (9.3 overs)		Rahul Singh 124* (101); Ram Dayal 1/15 (5.1 overs)

Services won by 7 wickets
Sawai Mansingh Stadium, Jaipur
Umpires: Vinod Seshan and Arun Kumar Basa

- Services won the toss and elected to field.

6 October 2019
Scorecard

Tamil Nadu; 315/8 (50 overs)	v	Tripura; 128 (34.3 overs)
Baba Aparajith 87 (97); Ajoy Sarkar 3/51 (10 overs)		Milind Kumar 24 (27); T. Natarajan 3/22 (8 overs)

Tamil Nadu won by 187 runs
KL Saini Ground, Jaipur
Umpires: Saurabh Dhote and VM Dhokre

- Tamil Nadu won the toss and elected to bat.

=== Round 10 ===
7 October 2019
Scorecard

Madhya Pradesh; 223 (47.4 overs)	v	Bengal; 83/2 (18 overs)
Yash Dubey 106 (105); Manoj Tiwary 2/23 (3 overs)		Shreevats Goswami 37* (55); Gaurav Yadav 1/26 (4 overs)

No result
Sawai Mansingh Stadium, Jaipur
Umpires: Arun Kumar Basa and Pashchim Pathak

- Madhya Pradesh won the toss and elected to bat.
- Rain during Bengal's innings prevented any further play.
- Ritwik Roy Chowdhury and Ayan Bhattacharjee (Bengal) both made their List A debuts.

7 October 2019
Scorecard

Railways; 231 (49.2 overs)	v	Gujarat; 127/1 (25.1 overs)
Pratham Singh 76 (78); Piyush Chawla 4/46 (10 overs)		Parthiv Patel 59 (66); Shivendra Singh 1/28 (7.1 overs)

Gujarat won by 43 runs (VJD method)
KL Saini Ground, Jaipur
Umpires: Vinod Seshan and Saurabh Dhote

- Railways won the toss and elected to bat.
- Rain during Gujarat's innings prevented any further play.

7 October 2019
Scorecard

Jammu & Kashmir; 326/6 (50 overs)	v	Bihar; 128/4 (30.2 overs)
Shubham Khajuria 127 (121); Vivek Kumar 2/73 (8 overs)		Babul Kumar 42* (64); Parvez Rasool 3/22 (7 overs)

Jammu & Kashmir won by 65 runs (VJD method)
Jaipuriya Vidhyalaya Ground, Jaipur
Umpires: Nand Kishore and VM Dhokre

- Bihar won the toss and elected to field.
- Rain during Bihar's innings prevented any further play.
- Sakibul Gani, Utkarsh Bhaskar and Shivam Kumar (Bihar) all made their List A debuts.

=== Round 11 ===
9 October 2019
Scorecard

Railways; 200/9 (50 overs)	v	Tamil Nadu; 203/2 (44.1 overs)
Manish Rao 55 (85); Baba Aparajith 4/30 (10 overs)		Baba Aparajith 111* (124); Ananta Saha 1/12 (6 overs)

Tamil Nadu won by 8 wickets
Sawai Mansingh Stadium, Jaipur
Umpires: Vinod Seshan and Nand Kishore

- Railways won the toss and elected to bat.
- Dhrushant Soni (Railways) made his List A debut.

9 October 2019
Scorecard

Rajasthan; 239/8 (50 overs)	v	Services; 191 (44 overs)
Aditya Garhwal 91 (79); Diwesh Pathania 3/28 (10 overs)		Mohit Ahlawat 49 (58); Rahul Chahar 4/56 (9 overs)

Rajasthan won by 48 runs
Jaipuriya Vidhyalaya Ground, Jaipur
Umpires: Arun Kumar Basa and Pashchim Pathak

- Services won the toss and elected to field.
- Shubham Sharma (Rajasthan) made his List A debut.

9 October 2019
Scorecard

Tripura; 224 (49 overs)	v	Bengal; 227/5 (47.1 overs)
Tanmay Mishra 72 (99); Akash Deep 2/29 (8 overs)		Manoj Tiwary 85 (103); Manisankar Murasingh 2/32 (10 overs)

Bengal won by 5 wickets
KL Saini Ground, Jaipur
Umpires: Saurabh Dhote and VM Dhokre

- Bengal won the toss and elected to field.
- Arkaprabha Sinha (Tripura) made his List A debut.

=== Round 12 ===
10 October 2019
Scorecard

Jammu & Kashmir; 182 (43.5 overs)	v	Madhya Pradesh; 178 (48 overs)
Jatin Wadhwan 43 (70); Gaurav Yadav 6/40 (9.5 overs)		Anand Bais 52 (94); Umar Nazir 3/25 (10 overs)

Jammu & Kashmir won by 4 runs
Jaipuriya Vidhyalaya Ground, Jaipur
Umpires: Nand Kishore and VM Dhokre

- Madhya Pradesh won the toss and elected to field.

10 October 2019
Scorecard

Gujarat; 279/9 (50 overs)	v	Services; 265/8 (50 overs)
Parthiv Patel 99 (106); Pulkit Narang 2/38 (10 overs)		Nakul Verma 82 (97); Roosh Kalaria 2/28 (9 overs)

Gujarat won by 14 runs
KL Saini Ground, Jaipur
Umpires: Saurabh Dhote and Pashchim Pathak

- Services won the toss and elected to field.

10 October 2019
Scorecard

Bihar; 216/7 (50 overs)	v	Bengal; 217/1 (40.2 overs)
Babul Kumar 93 (124); Akash Deep 3/45 (10 overs)		Abhimanyu Easwaran 112* (122); Shashi Shekhar 1/35 (6 overs)

Bengal won by 9 wickets
Sawai Mansingh Stadium, Jaipur
Umpires: Vinod Seshan and Arun Kumar Basa

- Bihar won the toss and elected to bat.
- Sarfaraz Ashraf, Vipul Krishna and Shashi Shekhar (Bihar) all made their List A debuts.

=== Round 13 ===
12 October 2019
Scorecard

Tamil Nadu; 360/4 (50 overs)	v	Madhya Pradesh; 149 (28.4 overs)
Abhinav Mukund 147 (139); Gaurav Yadav 1/68 (10 overs)		Anand Bais 34 (42); Murugan Ashwin 3/14 (4 overs)

Tamil Nadu won by 211 runs
Sawai Mansingh Stadium, Jaipur
Umpires: Vinod Seshan and Nand Kishore

- Madhya Pradesh won the toss and elected to field.
- Abhishek Tanwar (Tamil Nadu) made his List A debut.

12 October 2019
Scorecard

Tripura; 234/9 (50 overs)	v	Railways; 238/9 (49 overs)
Udiyan Bose 85 (120); Shivendra Singh 3/47 (10 overs)		Karn Sharma 109* (87); Ajoy Sarkar 2/40 (9 overs)

Railways won by 1 wicket
Jaipuriya Vidhyalaya Ground, Jaipur
Umpires: Arun Kumar Basa and VM Dhokre

- Tripura won the toss and elected to bat.
- Sandeep Yadav (Railways) made his List A debut.

12 October 2019
Scorecard

Rajasthan; 265/5 (50 overs)	v	Bihar; 109 (36.3 overs)
Rajesh Bishnoi 56* (46); Sarfaraz Ashraf 3/34 (10 overs)		MD Rahmatullah 38 (50); Rahul Chahar 4/45 (9 overs)

Rajasthan won by 159 runs
KL Saini Ground, Jaipur
Umpires: Saurabh Dhote and Pashchim Pathak

- Rajasthan won the toss and elected to bat.
- Chiranjivi Kumar (Bihar) made his List A debut.

=== Round 14 ===
14 October 2019
Scorecard

Bengal; 223 (49.1 overs)	v	Railways; 223 (50 overs)
Shreevats Goswami 56 (75); Himanshu Sangwan 3/49 (9 overs)		Pratham Singh 91 (131); Sayan Ghosh 3/61 (10 overs)

Match tied
Sawai Mansingh Stadium, Jaipur
Umpires: Vinod Seshan and Arun Kumar Basa

- Bengal won the toss and elected to bat.

14 October 2019
Scorecard

Bihar; 267/7 (50 overs)	v	Services; 269/5 (48.4 overs)
Babul Kumar 66 (86); Diwesh Pathania 3/63 (10 overs)		Ravi Chauhan 86 (107); Shivam Kumar 2/42 (10 overs)

Services won by 5 wickets
Jaipuriya Vidhyalaya Ground, Jaipur
Umpires: Pashchim Pathak and Nand Kishore

- Bihar won the toss and elected to bat.

14 October 2019
Scorecard

Jammu & Kashmir; 279/8 (50 overs)	v	Gujarat; 282/2 (37.3 overs)
Abdul Samad 68 (53); Roosh Kalaria 2/34 (10 overs)		Priyank Panchal 135* (132); Parvez Rasool 1/30 (7 overs)

Gujarat won by 8 wickets
KL Saini Ground, Jaipur
Umpires: Saurabh Dhote and VM Dhokre

- Gujarat won the toss and elected to field.

=== Round 15 ===
16 October 2019
Scorecard

Tamil Nadu; 274/9 (50 overs)	v	Gujarat; 196 (42.2 overs)
Murali Vijay 94 (106); Roosh Kalaria 3/36 (7 overs)		Axar Patel 55 (55); M Mohammed 3/20 (5 overs)

Tamil Nadu won by 78 runs
Jaipuriya Vidhyalaya Ground, Jaipur
Umpires: Saurabh Dhote and VM Dhokre

- Gujarat won the toss and elected to field.

16 October 2019
Scorecard

Bihar; 251 (49.5 overs)	v	Tripura; 253/3 (43.4 overs)
Shasheem Rathour 76 (116); Abhijit Sarkar 4/44 (10 overs)		Udiyan Bose 121 (118); Shivam Kumar 1/46 (10 overs)

Tripura won by 7 wickets
KL Saini Ground, Jaipur
Umpires: Vinod Seshan and Arun Kumar Basa

- Bihar won the toss and elected to bat.
- Vikash Yadav (Bihar) made his List A debut.

16 October 2019
Scorecard

Rajasthan; 249/7 (50 overs)	v	Madhya Pradesh; 251/4 (47 overs)
Rajesh Bishnoi 104 (88); Gaurav Yadav 3/56 (10 overs)		Venkatesh Iyer 109* (117); Abhimanyu Lamba 2/63 (10 overs)

Madhya Pradesh won by 6 wickets
Sawai Mansingh Stadium, Jaipur
Umpires: Pashchim Pathak and Nand Kishore

- Rajasthan won the toss and elected to bat.
- Ashutosh Sharma (Madhya Pradesh) made his List A debut.
