= 2019–20 Syed Mushtaq Ali Trophy Group D =

Cricket tournament

- Dates: 8 – 18 November 2019
- Administrator: BCCI
- Cricket format: Twenty20 cricket
- Tournament format: Round-robin
- Participants: 8

The 2019–20 Syed Mushtaq Ali Trophy was the eleventh season of the Syed Mushtaq Ali Trophy, a Twenty20 cricket tournament in India. It was contested by 38 teams, divided into five groups, with eight teams in Group D. The group stage started on 8 November 2019. The top two teams from Group D progressed to the Super League section of the competition.

On 7 November, after a selection controversy, Mumbai sacked two of their selectors and formed a "adhoc" selection panel made of three other selectors. Mizoram cricket team's captain Abrar Kazi was arrested after allegedly fixing matches in the Karnataka Premier League. Three rain-affected matches from the first day of the tournament were rescheduled to take place on 18 November 2019.

Following the conclusion of matches played on 17 November 2019, Mumbai and Haryana had progressed to the Super League stage of the tournament.

== Points table ==
Team	Pld	W	L	T	NR	Pts	NRR
Mumbai	7	6	1	0	0	24	+2.126
Haryana	7	6	1	0	0	24	+1.744
Bengal	7	4	3	0	0	16	+1.289
Madhya Pradesh	7	4	3	0	0	16	+0.780
Pondicherry	7	4	3	0	0	16	+0.050
Meghalaya	7	3	4	0	0	12	−1.520
Assam	7	1	6	0	0	4	−0.490
Mizoram	7	0	7	0	0	0	−4.283

- Top two teams advanced to the Super League

== Fixtures ==
=== Round 1 ===
8 November 2019
Scorecard

Haryana	v	Meghalaya

Match abandoned
Bandra Kurla Complex Ground, Mumbai
Umpires: Nitin Pandit and Vineet Kulkarni

- No toss.
- No play was possible due to rain.
- The match was rescheduled to 18 November 2019.

8 November 2019
Scorecard

Mizoram; 77 (19.3 overs)	v	Mumbai; 78/0 (8.1 overs)
Taruwar Kohli 26 (31); Siddhesh Lad 5/13 (4 overs)		Jay Bista 54* (24)

Mumbai won by 10 wickets
Wankhede Stadium, Mumbai
Umpires: Amiesh Saheba and Sai Darshan Kumar

- Mumbai won the toss and elected to field.
- Uday Kumar Abhay, Sumit Lama (Mizoram) and Kruthik Hanagavadi (Mumbai) all made their T20 debuts.

8 November 2019
Scorecard

Bengal; 3/0 (0.3 overs)	v	Assam
Shreevats Goswami 1* (1)

No result
Bandra Kurla Complex Ground, Mumbai
Umpires: Nitin Pandit and Vineet Kulkarni

- Assam won the toss and elected to field.
- Rain during Bengal's innings prevented any further play.
- The match was rescheduled to 18 November 2019.

8 November 2019
Scorecard

Madhya Pradesh; 3/0 (0.4 overs)	v	Pondicherry
Ashutosh Sharma 2* (3)

No result
Wankhede Stadium, Mumbai
Umpires: Amiesh Saheba and Sai Darshan Kumar

- Madhya Pradesh won the toss and elected to bat.
- Rain during Pondicherry's innings prevented any further play.
- The match was rescheduled to 18 November 2019.

=== Round 2 ===
9 November 2019
Scorecard

Assam; 101/8 (20 overs)	v	Madhya Pradesh; 102/5 (16.3 overs)
Pallavkumar Das 33 (21); Saransh Jain 3/13 (4 overs)		Parth Sahani 27 (29); Abhilash Gogoi 3/24 (4 overs)

Madhya Pradesh won by 5 wickets
Bandra Kurla Complex Ground, Mumbai
Umpires: Amiesh Saheba and Vineet Kulkarni

- Madhya Pradesh won the toss and elected to field.
- Abhilash Gogoi (Assam) and Gaurav Yadav (Madhya Pradesh) both made their T20 debuts.

9 November 2019
Scorecard

Pondicherry; 126/6 (20 overs)	v	Meghalaya; 107/6 (20 overs)
Arun Karthik 73 (58); Amiangshu Sen 3/20 (4 overs)		Dwaraka Ravi Teja 51 (50); Vinay Kumar 2/20 (4 overs)

Pondicherry won by 19 runs
Wankhede Stadium, Mumbai
Umpires: Sai Darshan Kumar and Belur Ravi

- Meghalaya won the toss and elected to field.
- Subramanian Anand, Ashith Rajiv (Pondicherry), Mark Ingty, Kilco Marak and Bijon Dey (Meghalaya) all made their T20 debuts.

9 November 2019
Scorecard

Mizoram; 79/4 (20 overs)	v	Bengal; 82/1 (10 overs)
K. B. Pawan 35* (29); Akash Deep 2/9 (4 overs)		Vivek Singh 52 (32); Uday Kumar Abhay 1/5 (1 over)

Bengal won by 9 wickets
Bandra Kurla Complex Ground, Mumbai
Umpires: Amiesh Saheba and Vineet Kulkarni

- Bengal won the toss and elected to field.
- Agniv Pan (Bengal) made his T20 debut.

9 November 2019
Scorecard

Haryana; 153/5 (20 overs)	v	Mumbai; 154/2 (15.4 overs)
Harshal Patel 33 (27); Tushar Deshpande 2/27 (4 overs)		Suryakumar Yadav 81* (38); Arun Chaprana 1/31 (3.4 overs)

Mumbai won by 8 wickets
Wankhede Stadium, Mumbai
Umpires: Belur Ravi

- Mumbai won the toss and elected to field.

=== Round 3 ===
11 November 2019
Scorecard

Pondicherry; 155/7 (20 overs)	v	Mizoram; 124/4 (20 overs)
Subramanian Anand 42 (32); Sumit Lama 3/25 (4 overs)		Taruwar Kohli 76* (61); Ashith Rajiv 2/25 (4 overs)

Pondicherry won by 31 runs
Bandra Kurla Complex Ground, Mumbai
Umpires: Amiesh Saheba and Nitin Pandit

- Mizoram won the toss and elected to field.
- Reuben Lalhruaizela and Henry Lalsangzuala (Mizoram) both made their T20 debuts.

11 November 2019
Scorecard

Bengal; 207/4 (20 overs)	v	Meghalaya; 153/4 (20 overs)
Abhimanyu Easwaran 61 (32); Abhay Negi 2/31 (4 overs)		Sanjay Yadav 45* (28); Ishan Porel 2/22 (4 overs)

Bengal won by 54 runs
Wankhede Stadium, Mumbai
Umpires: Vineet Kulkarni and Belur Ravi

- Meghalaya won the toss and elected to field.

11 November 2019
Scorecard

Assam; 158/8 (20 overs)	v	Haryana; 159/7 (19.4 overs)
Riyan Parag 58 (31); Amit Mishra 2/23 (3 overs)		Harshal Patel 62 (34); Pritam Das 2/25 (3.4 overs)

Haryana won by 3 wickets
Bandra Kurla Complex Ground, Mumbai
Umpires: Amiesh Saheba and Nitin Pandit

- Haryana won the toss and elected to field.

11 November 2019
Scorecard

Madhya Pradesh; 159/5 (20 overs)	v	Mumbai; 165/1 (15.5 overs)
Parth Sahani 47 (36); Shams Mulani 1/17 (3 overs)		Aditya Tare 74* (48); Kuldeep Sen 1/29 (3 overs)

Mumbai won by 9 wickets
Wankhede Stadium, Mumbai
Umpires: Vineet Kulkarni and Belur Ravi

- Madhya Pradesh won the toss and elected to bat.
- Atif Attarwala (Mumbai) made his T20 debut.

=== Round 4 ===
12 November 2019
Scorecard

Madhya Pradesh; 213/5 (20 overs)	v	Mizoram; 127/2 (20 overs)
Rishabh Chouhan 63 (33); G Lalbiakvela 2/31 (4 overs)		Taruwar Kohli 81 (67); Ankit Sharma 1/21 (4 overs)

Madhya Pradesh won by 86 runs
Bandra Kurla Complex Ground, Mumbai
Umpires: Sai Darshan Kumar and Vineet Kulkarni

- Mizoram won the toss and elected to field.

12 November 2019
Scorecard

Assam; 108/7 (20 overs)	v	Meghalaya; 110/6 (18.5 overs)
Sibsankar Roy 50 (47); Raj Biswa 2/14 (4 overs); Sanjay Yadav 2/14 (4 overs)		Puneet Bisht 42 (23); Swarupam Purkayastha 3/17 (2.5 overs)

Meghalaya won by 4 wickets
Wankhede Stadium, Mumbai
Umpires: Amiesh Saheba and Nitin Pandit

- Meghalaya won the toss and elected to field.
- Roshan Alam (Assam) made his T20 debut.

12 November 2019
Scorecard

Bengal; 122/8 (20 overs)	v	Haryana; 126/5 (17.1 overs)
Shreevats Goswami 30 (17); Ashish Hooda 2/19 (3 overs)		Harshal Patel 35 (27); Shahbaz Ahmed 2/19 (4 overs)

Haryana won by 5 wickets
Bandra Kurla Complex Ground, Mumbai
Umpires: Sai Darshan Kumar and Vineet Kulkarni

- Bengal won the toss and elected to bat.

12 November 2019
Scorecard

Mumbai; 171/6 (20 overs)	v	Pondicherry; 144/7 (20 overs)
Suryakumar Yadav 57 (37); Sagar Trivedi 4/29 (4 overs)		Paras Dogra 45 (35); Shams Mulani 2/25 (4 overs)

Mumbai won by 27 runs
Wankhede Stadium, Mumbai
Umpires: Amiesh Saheba and Nitin Pandit

- Pondicherry won the toss and elected to field.

=== Round 5 ===
14 November 2019
Scorecard

Pondicherry; 114 (20 overs)	v	Haryana; 115/4 (15.1 overs)
Subramanian Anand 22 (23); Harshal Patel 3/14 (4 overs)		Guntashveer Singh 37 (40); Fabid Ahmed 2/8 (2 overs)

Haryana won by 6 wickets
Bandra Kurla Complex Ground, Mumbai
Umpires: Amiesh Saheba and Nitin Pandit

- Haryana won the toss and elected to field.

14 November 2019
Scorecard

Bengal; 153/4 (20 overs)	v	Mumbai; 154/7 (20 overs)
Vivek Singh 56 (45); Shubham Ranjane 3/17 (4 overs)		Jay Bista 48 (41); Arnab Nandi 2/9 (2 overs)

Mumbai won by 3 wickets
Wankhede Stadium, Mumbai
Umpires: Vineet Kulkarni and Belur Ravi

- Mumbai won the toss and elected to field.

14 November 2019
Scorecard

Mizoram; 66 (17.1 overs)	v	Assam; 70/1 (6 overs)
Taruwar Kohli 25 (27); Abu Nechim 3/3 (3.1 overs)		Pallavkumar Das 37 (14); Sumit Lama 1/11 (1 over)

Assam won by 9 wickets
Bandra Kurla Complex Ground, Mumbai
Umpires: Amiesh Saheba and Nitin Pandit

- Assam won the toss and elected to field.
- Lalfakzuala Renthlei (Mizoram) made his T20 debut.

14 November 2019
Scorecard

Madhya Pradesh; 244/4 (20 overs)	v	Meghalaya; 159/9 (20 overs)
Rajat Patidar 68 (29); Amiangshu Sen 1/16 (2 overs)		Puneet Bisht 44 (19); Saransh Jain 3/43 (4 overs)

Madhya Pradesh won by 85 runs
Wankhede Stadium, Mumbai
Umpires: Vineet Kulkarni and Belur Ravi

- Madhya Pradesh won the toss and elected to bat.

=== Round 6 ===
15 November 2019
Scorecard

Madhya Pradesh; 112 (20 overs)	v	Bengal; 114/4 (14.1 overs)
Rajat Patidar 43 (31); Akash Deep 3/13 (4 overs)		Shreevats Goswami 65* (40); Ishwar Pandey 2/20 (3 overs)

Bengal won by 6 wickets
Bandra Kurla Complex Ground, Mumbai
Umpires: Nitin Pandit and Vineet Kulkarni

- Bengal won the toss and elected to field.

15 November 2019
Scorecard

Mizoram; 95/5 (20 overs)	v	Haryana; 97/3 (9.4 overs)
KB Pawan 32 (38); Harshal Patel 1/13 (2 overs)		Chaitanya Bishnoi 42* (27); Lalhruaizela 3/26 (3 overs)

Haryana won by 7 wickets
Wankhede Stadium, Mumbai
Umpires: Sai Darshan Kumar and Belur Ravi

- Haryana won the toss and elected to field.
- Ravi Balhara (Haryana) made his T20 debut.

15 November 2019
Scorecard

Assam; 102 (18.4 overs)	v	Pondicherry; 106/4 (18 overs)
Rajjakuddin Ahmed 31 (21); Vinay Kumar 4/4 (3.4 overs)		Paras Dogra 38* (25); Rajjakuddin Ahmed 1/15 (2 overs)

Pondicherry won by 6 wickets
Bandra Kurla Complex Ground, Mumbai
Umpires: Nitin Pandit and Vineet Kulkarni

- Pondicherry won the toss and elected to field.

15 November 2019
Scorecard

Mumbai; 157/6 (20 overs)	v	Meghalaya; 161/4 (19.2 overs)
Jay Bista 44 (20); Swarajeet Das 2/31 (4 overs)		Dwaraka Ravi Teja 61* (45); Shardul Thakur 2/34 (4 overs)

Meghalaya won by 6 wickets
Wankhede Stadium, Mumbai
Umpires: Sai Darshan Kumar and Belur Ravi

- Mumbai won the toss and elected to bat.
- Chengkam Sangma (Meghalaya) made his T20 debut.

=== Round 7 ===
17 November 2019
Scorecard

Bengal; 132/6 (20 overs)	v	Pondicherry; 135/6 (19.4 overs)
Vivek Singh 43 (25); Selvam Suresh Kumar 4/17 (4 overs)		Damodaren Rohit 55 (44); Shahbaz Ahmed 2/16 (4 overs)

Pondicherry won by 4 wickets
Bandra Kurla Complex Ground, Mumbai
Umpires: Amiesh Saheba and Sai Darshan Kumar

- Pondicherry won the toss and elected to field.

17 November 2019
Scorecard

Mumbai; 206/5 (20 overs)	v	Assam; 123/8 (20 overs)
Aditya Tare 82 (48); Riyan Parag 3/30 (4 overs)		Riyan Parag 38 (33); Shivam Dube 2/3 (3 overs)

Mumbai won by 83 runs
Wankhede Stadium, Mumbai
Umpires: Nitin Pandit and Belur Ravi

- Assam won the toss and elected to field.

17 November 2019
Scorecard

Madhya Pradesh; 159/6 (20 overs)	v	Haryana; 162/6 (18.5 overs)
Rajat Patidar 69 (41); Harshal Patel 3/34 (4 overs)		Sumit Kumar 44* (22); Parth Sahani 2/17 (3 overs)

Haryana won by 4 wickets
Bandra Kurla Complex Ground, Mumbai
Umpires: Amiesh Saheba and Sai Darshan Kumar

- Madhya Pradesh won the toss and elected to bat.

17 November 2019
Scorecard

Meghalaya; 207/4 (20 overs)	v	Mizoram; 182/2 (20 overs)
Dwaraka Ravi Teja 53* (51); Lalhmangaiha 1/24 (3 overs)		Taruwar Kohli 90 (59); Raj Biswa 1/29 (4 overs)

Meghalaya won by 25 runs
Wankhede Stadium, Mumbai
Umpires: Nitin Pandit and Belur Ravi

- Mizoram won the toss and elected to field.

=== Round 8 ===
18 November 2019
Scorecard

Haryana; 202/6 (20 overs)	v	Meghalaya; 103 (19.3 overs)
Harshal Patel 82 (40); Amiangshu Sen 2/19 (2 overs)		Abhay Negi 25 (18); Harshal Patel 3/22 (4 overs)

Haryana won by 99 runs
Bandra Kurla Complex Ground, Mumbai
Umpires: Nitin Pandit and Vineet Kulkarni

- Meghalaya won the toss and elected to field.
- Vipin Kumar (Haryana) made his T20 debut.
- This match was rescheduled from 8 November 2019.

18 November 2019
Scorecard

Assam; 140/8 (20 overs)	v	Bengal; 141/2 (16.5 overs)
Sibsankar Roy 41 (41); Ishan Porel 3/23 (4 overs)		Vivek Singh 46 (26); Sibsankar Roy 1/8 (1 over)

Bengal won by 8 wickets
Bandra Kurla Complex Ground, Mumbai
Umpires: Nitin Pandit and Vineet Kulkarni

- Assam won the toss and elected to bat.
- Ravikant Singh (Bengal) made his T20 debut.
- This match was rescheduled from 8 November 2019.

18 November 2019
Scorecard

Madhya Pradesh; 177/6 (20 overs)	v	Pondicherry; 172/5 (20 overs)
Ashutosh Sharma 84 (51); Vinay Kumar 4/30 (4 overs)		Arun Karthik 60 (41); Rahul Batham 2/24 (4 overs)

Madhya Pradesh won by 5 runs
Wankhede Stadium, Mumbai
Umpires: Amiesh Saheba and Sai Darshan Kumar

- Pondicherry won the toss and elected to field.
- Santha Moorthy (Pondicherry) and Rahul Batham (Madhya Pradesh) both made their T20 debuts.
- This match was rescheduled from 8 November 2019.
