= 2019–20 Vijay Hazare Trophy Group B =

Cricket tournament

- Dates: 24 September – 17 October 2019
- Administrator(s): BCCI
- Cricket format: List A cricket
- Tournament format(s): Round-robin
- Participants: 9

The 2019–20 Vijay Hazare Trophy is the 18th season of the Vijay Hazare Trophy, a List A cricket tournament in India. It is being contested by 38 teams, divided into four groups, with nine teams in Group B. The group stage started on 24 September 2019. The top five teams across Group A and Group B progressed to the quarter-finals of the competition.

Seventeen out of the first thirty matches that were scheduled to be played across all four groups were abandoned or finished in a no result. Therefore, the Board of Control for Cricket in India (BCCI) issued a revised schedule for the rain-affected matches. By 3 October 2019, twenty-two fixtures in Group B had been abandoned due to rain. Wasim Jaffer criticized the pitches for Group-B matches in Vadodara and called them "unfit" for List-A matches.

After the final group matches, Delhi and Punjab had both progressed from Group B to the knockout phase of the tournament.

== Points table ==
Pos	Team	Pld	W	L	T	NR	Pts	NRR
2	Delhi	8	5	2	0	1	22	0.306
3	Punjab	8	5	2	0	1	22	0.804
6	Uttar Pradesh	8	4	2	0	2	20	0.724
10	Maharashtra	8	3	3	0	2	16	−0.073
11	Himachal Pradesh	8	3	4	0	1	14	0.039
12	Odisha	8	3	4	0	1	14	−1.052
13	Baroda	8	3	5	0	0	12	0.230
14	Vidarbha	8	3	5	0	0	12	−0.061
16	Haryana	8	3	5	0	0	12	−0.978

- Top five teams across Groups A and B advanced to the knockout stage.
- Bottom two teams across Groups A and B relegated to the Elite Group C for the next season.

== Fixtures ==
=== Round 1 ===
2 October 2019
Scorecard

Odisha; 145/8 (21 overs)	v	Himachal Pradesh; 142/9 (21 overs)
Subhranshu Senapati 39 (34); Ankit Maini 3/14 (5 overs)		Prashant Chopra 48 (37); Govinda Poddar 4/27 (5 overs)

Odisha won by 3 runs
Sangramsinh Gaekwad Sports Academy, Vadodara
Umpires: Amiesh Saheba and Anil Dandekar

- Himachal Pradesh won the toss and elected to field.
- The match was reduced to 21 overs per side due to a wet outfield.
- Ankit Maini (Himachal Pradesh) made his List A debut.

2 October 2019
Scorecard

Maharashtra	v	Vidarbha

Match abandoned
Gujarat State Fertilizer Corporation Ground, Vadodara
Umpires: Abhijit Bengeri and Sivasubramaniyan Shankar

- No toss.
- No play was possible due to a wet outfield.

=== Round 2 ===
3 October 2019
Scorecard

Maharashtra	v	Uttar Pradesh

Match abandoned
Gujarat State Fertilizer Corporation Ground, Vadodara
Umpires: Abhijit Bengeri and Rohan Pandit

- No toss.
- No play was possible due to a wet outfield.

3 October 2019
Scorecard

Odisha	v	Punjab

Match abandoned
Moti Bagh Stadium, Vadodara
Umpires: Sivasubramaniyan Shankar and Anil Dandekar

- No toss.
- No play was possible due to a wet outfield.

=== Round 3 ===
4 October 2019
Scorecard

Delhi; 148 (37.4 overs)	v	Baroda; 128 (33.2 overs)
Nitish Rana 27 (42); Krunal Pandya 4/34 (8 overs)		Krunal Pandya 20 (16); Navdeep Saini 3/24 (8 overs)

Delhi won by 10 runs (VJD method)
Moti Bagh Stadium, Vadodara
Umpires: Abhijit Bengeri and Rohan Pandit

- Baroda won the toss and elected to field.
- Baroda were set a revised target of 138 runs from 38 overs.
- Mitesh Patel (Baroda) and Anuj Rawat (Delhi) both made their List A debuts.

4 October 2019
Scorecard

Odisha; 207/9 (46 overs)	v	Haryana; 208/6 (43.5 overs)
Govinda Poddar 64 (95); Sumit Kumar 3/13 (5 overs)		Jayant Yadav 67 (86); Deepak Behera 2/31 (7 overs)

Haryana won by 4 wickets (VJD method)
Sangramsinh Gaekwad Sports Academy, Vadodara
Umpires: Anil Dandekar and Amiesh Saheba

- Odisha won the toss and elected to bat.
- The match was reduced to 46 overs per side due to rain.
- Ankit Kumar, Sumit Kumar (Haryana) and Swastik Samal (Odisha) all made their List A debuts.

4 October 2019
Scorecard

Himachal Pradesh	v	Uttar Pradesh

Match abandoned
Gujarat State Fertilizer Corporation Ground, Vadodara
Umpires: Sivasubramaniyan Shankar and Belur Ravi

- No toss.
- No play was possible due to a wet outfield.

=== Round 4 ===
5 October 2019
Scorecard

Haryana; 217 (49.1 overs)	v	Baroda; 159 (40.2 overs)
Sumit Kumar 58 (66); Krunal Pandya 3/46 (10 overs)		Aditya Waghmode 65 (94); Sumit Kumar 5/14 (6 overs)

Haryana won by 58 runs
Moti Bagh Stadium, Vadodara
Umpires: Abhijit Bengeri and Rohan Pandit

- Haryana won the toss and elected to bat.

5 October 2019
Scorecard

Delhi	v	Maharashtra

Match abandoned
Gujarat State Fertilizer Corporation Ground, Vadodara
Umpires: Amiesh Saheba and Anil Dandekar

- No toss.
- No play was possible due to a wet outfield.

5 October 2019
Scorecard

Vidarbha; 155 (43.1 overs)	v	Punjab; 158/3 (46.2 overs)
Faiz Fazal 72 (96); Karan Kaila 4/32 (9.1 overs)		Gurkeerat Singh 51* (85); Akshay Wakhare 2/29 (10 overs)

Punjab won by 7 wickets
Sangramsinh Gaekwad Sports Academy, Vadodara
Umpires: Kamlesh Sharma and Belur Ravi

- Punjab won the toss and elected to field.
- Anmol Malhotra and Ramandeep Singh (Punjab) both made their List A debuts.

=== Round 5 ===
6 October 2019
Scorecard

Haryana; 49 (16 overs)	v	Punjab; 50/7 (15.1 overs)
Nitin Saini 22 (31); Sandeep Sharma 7/19 (8 overs)		Abhishek Sharma 22* (43); Ajit Chahal 4/32 (7.1 overs)

Punjab won by 3 wickets
Moti Bagh Stadium, Vadodara
Umpires: Belur Ravi and Amiesh Saheba

- Haryana won the toss and elected to bat.

=== Round 6 ===
7 October 2019
Scorecard

Baroda; 212/6 (50 overs)	v	Uttar Pradesh; 213/3 (47.4 overs)
Vishnu Solanki 58 (108); Ankit Rajpoot 3/43 (10 overs)		Akshdeep Nath 75* (107); Bhargav Bhatt 1/36 (10 overs)

Uttar Pradesh won by 7 wickets
Moti Bagh Stadium, Vadodara
Umpires: Anil Dandekar and Belur Ravi

- Baroda won the toss and elected to bat.
- Abhimanyusingh Rajput (Baroda), Ankit Chaudhary and Mohit Jangra (Uttar Pradesh) all made their List A debuts.

9 October 2019
Scorecard

Vidarbha; 183 (41.4 overs)	v	Himachal Pradesh; 184/4 (38.4 overs)
Ganesh Satish 67 (81); Rishi Dhawan 4/35 (8 overs)		Prashant Chopra 82 (94); Yash Thakur 2/21 (7 overs)

Himachal Pradesh won by 6 wickets
Gujarat State Fertilizer Corporation Ground, Vadodara
Umpires: Amiesh Saheba and Kamlesh Sharma

- Himachal Pradesh won the toss and elected to field.
- The match was reduced to 42 overs per side due to a wet outfield.

7 October 2019
Scorecard

Maharashtra; 259/8 (50 overs)	v	Odisha; 260/7 (49.1 overs)
Rahul Tripathi 69 (91); Suryakant Pradhan 3/50 (9 overs)		Subhranshu Senapati 119* (130); Azim Kazi 2/45 (10 overs)

Odisha won by 3 wickets
Sangramsinh Gaekwad Sports Academy, Vadodara
Umpires: Abhijit Bengeri and Rohan Pandit

- Maharashtra won the toss and elected to bat.
- Azim Kazi, Avdhoot Dandekar and Mukesh Choudhary (Maharashtra) all made their List A debuts.

=== Round 7 ===
8 October 2019
Scorecard

Delhi; 204/8 (50 overs)	v	Uttar Pradesh; 207/5 (29 overs)
Himmat Singh 64 (77); Mohsin Khan 3/49 (10 overs)		Priyam Garg 79 (52); Navdeep Saini 2/48 (8 overs)

Uttar Pradesh won by 5 wickets
Moti Bagh Stadium, Vadodara
Umpires: Abhijit Bengeri and Anil Dandekar

- Uttar Pradesh won the toss and elected to field.

8 October 2019
Scorecard

Haryana; 83 (30.5 overs)	v	Vidarbha; 85/1 (20.1 overs)
Amit Mishra 26 (44); Darshan Nalkande 4/25 (9 overs)		Faiz Fazal 38* (65); Jayant Yadav 1/29 (7 overs)

Vidarbha won by 9 wickets
Gujarat State Fertilizer Corporation Ground, Vadodara
Umpires: Belur Ravi and Rohan Pandit

- Haryana won the toss and elected to bat.

8 October 2019
Scorecard

Himachal Pradesh; 243/9 (50 overs)	v	Punjab; 218 (49 overs)
Nikhil Gangta 40 (49); Karan Kaila 3/36 (10 overs)		Ramandeep Singh 62 (108); Pankaj Jaswal 3/62 (9 overs)

Himachal Pradesh won by 25 runs
Sangramsinh Gaekwad Sports Academy, Vadodara
Umpires: Kamlesh Sharma and Amiesh Saheba

- Punjab won the toss and elected to field.

=== Round 8 ===
9 October 2019
Scorecard

Baroda; 222/8 (50 overs)	v	Punjab; 223/7 (49.5 overs)
Vishnu Solanki 54 (74); Siddarth Kaul 4/58 (10 overs)		Gurkeerat Singh 39 (34); Rishi Arothe 3/47 (9.5 overs)

Punjab won by 3 wickets
Moti Bagh Stadium, Vadodara
Umpires: Anil Dandekar and Belur Ravi

- Punjab won the toss and elected to field.
- Abhijeet Garg (Punjab) made his List A debut.

=== Round 9 ===
10 October 2019
Scorecard

Baroda; 249/9 (50 overs)	v	Maharashtra; 224/9 (50 overs)
Yusuf Pathan 83 (80); Samad Fallah 5/41 (10 overs)		Ankit Bawne 39 (81); Yusuf Pathan 3/33 (7 overs)

Baroda won by 25 runs
Moti Bagh Stadium, Vadodara
Umpires: Abhijit Bengeri and Anil Dandekar

- Maharashtra won the toss and elected to field.
- Soyeb Sopariya (Baroda) made his List A debut.

10 October 2019
Scorecard

Delhi; 299/6 (50 overs)	v	Odisha; 236/8 (50 overs)
Anuj Rawat 69 (88); Suryakant Pradhan 3/73 (10 overs)		Subhranshu Senapati 77 (77); Manan Sharma 3/40 (10 overs)

Delhi won by 63 runs
Gujarat State Fertilizer Corporation Ground, Vadodara
Umpires: Amiesh Saheba and Kamlesh Sharma

- Odisha won the toss and elected to field
- Kunwar Bidhuri (Delhi) made his List A debut.

10 October 2019
Scorecard

Himachal Pradesh; 214/8 (50 overs)	v	Haryana; 130 (38.2 overs)
Amit Kumar 47 (62); Yuzvendra Chahal 2/31 (10 overs)		Chaitanya Bishnoi 37 (87); Mayank Dagar 4/19 (8.2 overs)

Himachal Pradesh won by 84 runs
Sangramsinh Gaekwad Sports Academy, Vadodara
Umpires: Belur Ravi and Rohan Pandit

- Himachal Pradesh won the toss and elected to bat.
- Yashu Sharma (Haryana) made his List A debut.

=== Round 10 ===
11 October 2019
Scorecard

Delhi; 207/8 (50 overs)	v	Vidarbha; 208/5 (48.2 overs)
Nitish Rana 100* (112); Aditya Sarwate 2/41 (8 overs)		Faiz Fazal 92 (126); Navdeep Saini 1/34 (9 overs)

Vidarbha won by 5 wickets
Gujarat State Fertilizer Corporation Ground, Vadodara
Umpires: Amiesh Saheba and Rohan Pandit

- Vidarbha won the toss and elected to field.

=== Round 11 ===
12 October 2019
Scorecard

Haryana; 135 (39.5 overs)	v	Maharashtra; 136/5 (35.1 overs)
Sumit Kumar 47* (64); Azim Kazi 4/31 (7.5 overs)		Naushad Shaikh 48* (61); Jayant Yadav 2/36 (9 overs)

Maharashtra won by 5 wickets
Darshanam Sports and Education Academy Cricket Ground, Vadodara
Umpires: Amiesh Saheba and Anil Dandekar

- Maharashtra won the toss and elected to field.

12 October 2019
Scorecard

Odisha; 223/8 (50 overs)	v	Vidarbha; 192 (46.1 overs)
Govinda Poddar 76 (87); Yash Thakur 3/46 (9 overs)		Akshay Karnewar 70 (65); Shantanu Mishra 3/19 (5 overs)

Odisha won by 32 runs
Moti Bagh Stadium, Vadodara
Umpires: Belur Ravi and Kamlesh Sharma

- Odisha won the toss and elected to bat.
- Debasish Samantray (Odisha) made his List A debut.

12 October 2019
Scorecard

Punjab; 204 (50 overs)	v	Uttar Pradesh; 141 (38.4 overs)
Gurkeerat Singh 66 (82); Ankit Rajpoot 4/36 (10 overs)		Upendra Yadav 46 (68); Karan Kaila 4/22 (10 overs)

Punjab won by 63 runs
Gujarat State Fertilizer Corporation Ground, Vadodara
Umpires: Abhijit Bengeri and Rohan Pandit

- Uttar Pradesh won the toss and elected to field.

=== Round 12 ===
13 October 2019
Scorecard

Odisha; 73 (25 overs)	v	Baroda; 75/1 (15 overs)
Abhishek Raut 32* (47); Swapnil Singh 4/8 (4 overs)		Aditya Waghmode 47* (56); Debabrata Pradhan 1/17 (4 overs)

Baroda won by 9 wickets
Moti Bagh Stadium, Vadodara
Umpires: Amiesh Saheba

- Odisha won the toss and elected to bat.

13 October 2019
Scorecard

Himachal Pradesh; 201/9 (50 overs)	v	Maharashtra; 205/7 (48.4 overs)
Amit Kumar 62 (79); Samad Fallah 2/29 (9 overs)		Abrar Kazi 84 (82); Ayush Jamwal 2/48 (10 overs)

Maharashtra won by 3 wickets
Gujarat State Fertilizer Corporation Ground, Vadodara
Umpires: Kamlesh Sharma and Abhijit Bengeri

- Himachal Pradesh won the toss and elected to bat.
- Arpit Guleria (Himachal Pradesh) made his List A debut.

=== Round 13 ===
14 October 2019
Scorecard

Himachal Pradesh; 161 (44 overs)	v	Baroda; 165/8 (34.5 overs)
Nikhil Gangta 46* (77); Bhargav Bhatt 3/24 (10 overs)		Swapnil Singh 66* (85); Ankush Bedi 3/43 (7 overs)

Baroda won by 2 wickets
Moti Bagh Stadium, Vadodara
Umpires: Abhijit Bengeri and Rohan Pandit

- Baroda won the toss and elected to field.
- Ankush Bedi (Himachal Pradesh) made his List A debut.

14 October 2019
Scorecard

Delhi; 220/8 (50 overs)	v	Punjab; 215/9 (50 overs)
Lalit Yadav 54* (53); Siddarth Kaul 5/48 (10 overs)		Anmolpreet Singh 73 (95); Lalit Yadav 2/22 (5 overs)

Delhi won by 5 runs
Sangramsinh Gaekwad Sports Academy, Vadodara
Umpires: Belur Ravi and Kamlesh Sharma

- Punjab won the toss and elected to field.

14 October 2019
Scorecard

Uttar Pradesh; 211 (49 overs)	v	Vidarbha; 102 (31.1 overs)
Priyam Garg 120 (158); Akshay Karnewar 3/38 (10 overs)		Darshan Nalkande 26 (37); Saurabh Kumar 6/25 (9.3 overs)

Uttar Pradesh won by 109 runs
Gujarat State Fertilizer Corporation Ground, Vadodara
Umpires: Amiesh Saheba and Anil Dandekar

- Uttar Pradesh won the toss and elected to bat.

=== Round 14 ===
15 October 2019
Scorecard

Baroda; 131 (50 overs)	v	Vidarbha; 134/3 (34.2 overs)
Rishi Arothe 30 (41); Akshay Wakhare 4/22 (10 overs)		Faiz Fazal 58* (94); Yusuf Pathan 1/13 (6 overs)

Vidarbha won by 7 wickets
Moti Bagh Stadium, Vadodara
Umpires: Belur Ravi and Rohan Pandit

- Vidarbha won the toss and elected to field.

=== Round 15 ===
16 October 2019
Scorecard

Haryana; 172 (45.3 overs)	v	Delhi; 176/3 (30.3 overs)
Rohit Sharma 44 (65); Manan Sharma 3/39 (10 overs)		Anuj Rawat 56* (59); Yuzvendra Chahal 2/37 (8.3 overs)

Delhi won by 7 wickets
Gujarat State Fertilizer Corporation Ground, Vadodara
Umpires: Abhijit Bengeri and Anil Dandekar

- Delhi won the toss and elected to field.
- Gaurav Kumar (Delhi) made his List A debut.

16 October 2019
Scorecard

Maharashtra; 65 (27.2 overs)	v	Punjab; 66/4 (27 overs)
Naushad Shaikh 22 (40); Sandeep Sharma 4/24 (7.2 overs)		Sanvir Singh 35* (79); Satyajeet Bachhav 3/24 (10 overs)

Punjab won by 6 wickets
Moti Bagh Stadium, Vadodara
Umpires: Amiesh Saheba and Rohan Pandit

- Punjab won the toss and elected to field.

16 October 2019
Scorecard

Odisha; 128 (41.4 overs)	v	Uttar Pradesh; 129/5 (29.3 overs)
Subhranshu Senapati 31 (58); Mohsin Khan 6/27 (8.4 overs)		Upendra Yadav 31* (41); Suryakant Pradhan 2/27 (6 overs)

Uttar Pradesh won by 5 wickets
Gujarat State Fertilizer Corporation Ground, Vadodara
Umpires: Belur Ravi and Kamlesh Sharma

- Uttar Pradesh won the toss and elected to field.

=== Round 16 ===
17 October 2019
Scorecard

Himachal Pradesh; 176 (41.2 overs)	v	Delhi; 177/7 (42.5 overs)
Rishi Dhawan 41 (47); Pawan Negi 4/32 (8.2 overs)		Shikhar Dhawan 31 (54); Mayank Dagar 2/48 (8.5 overs)

Delhi won by 3 wickets
Moti Bagh Stadium, Vadodara
Umpires: Belur Ravi and Rohan Pandit

- Delhi won the toss and elected to field.

17 October 2019
Scorecard

Haryana; 208 (49.1 overs)	v	Uttar Pradesh; 188 (44.1 overs)
Nitin Saini 65 (106); Saurabh Kumar 3/30 (10 overs)		Rinku Singh 68 (74); Harshal Patel 3/34 (8 overs)

Haryana won by 20 runs
Sangramsinh Gaekwad Sports Academy, Vadodara
Umpires: Anil Dandekar and Amiesh Saheba

- Uttar Pradesh won the toss and elected to field.
- Madhav Kaushik (Uttar Pradesh) made his List A debut.

17 October 2019
Scorecard

Maharashtra; 260/7 (50 overs)	v	Vidarbha; 227 (46.4 overs)
Ankit Bawne 92 (117); Akshay Karnewar 3/40 (10 overs)		Akshay Wadkar 75 (90); Azim Kazi 5/46 (10 overs)

Maharashtra won by 33 runs
Gujarat State Fertilizer Corporation Ground, Vadodara
Umpires: Kamlesh Sharma and Abhijit Bengeri

- Vidarbha won the toss and elected to field.
