= Saheba =

Saheba may refer to:

== People with the name ==
- Amiesh Saheba (born 1959), Indian cricket umpire and former cricketer
- Mahesh Saheba (1932–2006), Indian cricketer
- Samrat Saheba (born 1981), Indian cricketer

== Other uses ==
- Saheba (film), a 2017 Kannada language film

== See also ==
- Thaayi Saheba (Kannada: ತಾಯಿ ಸಾಹೇಬ), a Kannada language film released in 1997 directed by Girish Kasaravalli
