= Vikash =

Vikash is a given name. Notable people called Vikash include:

- Steven Vikash Chand, one of 17 people arrested in the 2006 Toronto terrorism arrests
- Vikash Dhorasoo (born 1973), former French professional footballer of Indo-Mauritian descent
- Vikash Jaiswal, Indian entrepreneur
- Vikash Kumar (born 1996), Indian cricketer
- Vikash Maharaj (born 1957), Indian sarod player
- Vikash Mohan (Indian cricketer), Indian cricketer
- Vikash Mohan (Trinidadian cricketer) (born 1994), Trinidadian cricketer
- Vikash Kumar Munda, Indian politician
- Vikash Patel (born 1997), Indian cricketer
- Vikash Ranjan (born 1994), Indian cricketer
- Vikash Singh (born 1994), Indian cricketer
- Manav Vikash Thakkar, Indian table-tennis player
- Vikash Tillé (born 1997), Guadeloupean professional footballer
- Vikash Vishal (born 1999), Indian cricketer
- Vikash Yadav (born 1988), Indian cricketer

== See also ==
- Assam Gramin Vikash Bank, the only regional rural bank of Assam, India
- Bangiya Gramin Vikash Bank (BGVB) is an Indian Regional Rural Bank
- Pradhan Mantri Kaushal Vikash Yojana
- Vic Ash
- Vikas
