= Sandeep Yadav =

Sandeep Yadav may refer to:

- Sandeep Yadav (actor), in Aur Bhai Kya Chal Raha Hai
- Sandeep Yadav (cricketer)
