= Indian cricket team in Bangladesh in 2022–23 =

International cricket tour

Indian cricket team in Bangladesh in 2022
	Bangladesh	India
- Dates: 4 – 26 December 2022
Captains	Shakib Al Hasan (Tests); Litton Das (ODIs)	KL Rahul (Tests); Rohit Sharma (Note: KL Rahul captained India in the third ODI.) (ODIs)

Test series
- Result: India won the 2-match series 2–0
Most runs	Zakir Hasan (186)	Cheteshwar Pujara (222)
Most wickets	Mehidy Hasan (11)	Kuldeep Yadav (8)
- Player of the series: Cheteshwar Pujara (Ind)

One Day International series
- Results: Bangladesh won the 3-match series 2–1
Most runs	Mehidy Hasan (141)	Ishan Kishan (210)
Most wickets	Shakib Al Hasan (9); Ebadot Hossain (9)	Washington Sundar (6); Mohammed Siraj (6)
- Player of the series: Mehidy Hasan (Ban)

The Indian cricket team toured Bangladesh to play two Tests and three One Day Internationals (ODIs) in December 2022. The Test series formed part of the 2021–2023 ICC World Test Championship. On 20 October 2022 Bangladesh Cricket Board (BCB) confirmed the fixture. However, on 23 November, the venue of the third ODI was shifted from Mirpur to Chittagong due to political reasons.

Bangladesh won the ODI series by 2–1 margin and it was their second successive ODI series win against India at home.

India won the first Test match comprehensively by 188 runs. In the second Test, while chasing 145 India lost 7 wickets for 74, but a 71-run partnership between Shreyas Iyer and Ravichandran Ashwin for the eighth wicket lead India to a 3 wicket win and India eventually winning the Test series by 2–0 margin.

== Squads ==
Bangladesh		India	
Tests	ODIs	Tests	ODIs
Shakib Al Hasan (c); Litton Das (vc, wk); Khaled Ahmed; Nasum Ahmed; Taskin Ahmed; Yasir Ali; Mehidy Hasan; Nurul Hasan (wk); Zakir Hasan (wk); Mahmudul Hasan Joy; Anamul Haque; Mominul Haque; Ebadot Hossain; Najmul Hossain Shanto; Shoriful Islam; Taijul Islam; Mushfiqur Rahim (wk); Rejaur Rahman Raja	Litton Das (c, wk); Shakib Al Hasan; Nasum Ahmed; Taskin Ahmed; Yasir Ali; Mehidy Hasan; Nurul Hasan (wk); Anamul Haque (wk); Afif Hossain; Ebadot Hossain; Najmul Hossain Shanto; Shoriful Islam; ~~Tamim Iqbal~~; Hasan Mahmud; Mahmudullah; Mushfiqur Rahim (wk); Mustafizur Rahman	~~Rohit Sharma (c)~~; KL Rahul (c); Cheteshwar Pujara (vc); Ravichandran Ashwin; K. S. Bharat (wk); Abhimanyu Easwaran; Shubman Gill; Shreyas Iyer; ~~Ravindra Jadeja~~; Virat Kohli; Saurabh Kumar; Rishabh Pant (wk); Axar Patel; ~~Navdeep Saini~~; ~~Mohammed Shami~~; Mohammed Siraj; Shardul Thakur; Jaydev Unadkat; Kuldeep Yadav; Umesh Yadav	Rohit Sharma (c); KL Rahul (vc, wk); Shahbaz Ahmed; Deepak Chahar; ~~Yash Dayal~~; Shikhar Dhawan; Shreyas Iyer; ~~Ravindra Jadeja~~; Ishan Kishan (wk); Virat Kohli; Umran Malik; ~~Rishabh Pant (wk)~~; Axar Patel; Rajat Patidar; Kuldeep Sen; ~~Mohammed Shami~~; Mohammed Siraj; Washington Sundar; Shardul Thakur; Rahul Tripathi; Kuldeep Yadav

Prior to the series, Ravindra Jadeja was ruled out of the ODI series as he was yet to recover from knee surgery and he was replaced by Shahbaz Ahmed. Yash Dayal was ruled out due to a lower back injury and was replaced by Kuldeep Sen. Shoriful Islam was added to the Bangladesh's ODI squad as cover for injured Taskin Ahmed. Bangladesh's captain Tamim Iqbal was also ruled out of the ODI series due to a groin injury. On 2 December, Litton Das was named captain of Bangladesh for the ODI series. A day before the first ODI, India's Mohammed Shami was ruled out from the ODI series due to a shoulder injury, with Umran Malik named as his replacement. On the day of 1st ODI, Rishabh Pant was released from India's ODI squad. India's Deepak Chahar, Kuldeep Sen and Rohit Sharma were ruled out of the last ODI due to their respective injuries. Ahead of the third ODI, Kuldeep Yadav was added to the India's ODI squad. Abhimanyu Easwaran was added to India's Test squad on 9 December. Jaydev Unadkat was also added to India's Test squad after Mohammed Shami was confirmed to be ruled out of the Test series. On 11 December, Ravindra Jadeja was ruled out of test series with Saurabh Kumar and Navdeep Saini both were added to India's Test squad. Rohit Sharma was also ruled out of the first Test with KL Rahul being named as captain of India. Nasum Ahmed was included in Bangladesh's squad for the 2nd test while Shoriful Islam and Ebadot Hossain were ruled out due to their respective injuries. On 20 December, Navdeep Saini and Rohit Sharma were also ruled out of the second Test.

== ODI series ==
=== 1st ODI ===
4 December 2022
12:00 (D/N)
Scorecard

India; 186 (41.2 overs)	v	Bangladesh; 190/9 (46 overs)
KL Rahul 73 (70); Shakib Al Hasan 5/36 (10 overs)		Litton Das 41 (63); Mohammed Siraj 3/32 (10 overs)

Bangladesh won by 1 wicket
Sher-e-Bangla National Cricket Stadium, Mirpur
Umpires: Tanvir Ahmed (Ban) and Michael Gough (Eng)
Player of the match: Mehidy Hasan (Ban)

- Bangladesh won the toss and elected to field.
- Litton Das captained Bangladesh for the first time in ODIs.
- Kuldeep Sen (Ind) made his ODI debut.

Batting first, India were bowled out at 186 with Shakib Al Hasan picking his fourth five wicket haul in ODIs. In reply, Bangladesh were reduced to 136/9 from 128/4. But Mehidy Hasan with Mustafizur Rahman added 51 runs for the last wicket partnership, which is the highest tenth wicket partnership for Bangladesh while chasing and overall fourth highest, to achieve the target with 24 balls to spare.

=== 2nd ODI ===
7 December 2022
12:00 (D/N)
Scorecard

Bangladesh; 271/7 (50 overs)	v	India; 266/9 (50 overs)
Mehidy Hasan 100* (83); Washington Sundar 3/37 (10 overs)		Shreyas Iyer 82 (102); Ebadot Hossain 3/45 (10 overs)

Bangladesh won by 5 runs
Sher-e-Bangla National Cricket Stadium, Mirpur
Umpires: Michael Gough (Eng) and Masudur Rahman (Ban)
Player of the match: Mehidy Hasan (Ban)

- Bangladesh won the toss and elected to bat.
- Mehidy Hasan (Ban) scored his maiden ODI century, and become only second batter to score a century batting at Number 8 or lower.
- The 148-run stand between Mahmudullah and Mehidy Hasan for the seventh wicket, is the highest partnership for any wicket for Bangladesh against India, and the highest seventh wicket partnership for any team against India.
- Rohit Sharma (Ind) became the only second batter to hit 500 sixes in international cricket.

Bangladesh were at 69/6 at the end of 19 overs. But the record-breaking stand between Mahmudullah and Mehidy Hasan helped Bangladesh to reach to 271 for the loss of 7 wickets at the end of 50 overs with the latter scoring his maiden ODI century. In reply, India were in trouble after being reduced to 65/4, then 107-run stand between Shreyas Iyer and Axar Patel gave them some resistance. At the end, the skipper Rohit Sharma who could not bat at his regular position due to finger injury, coming to bat at Number 9, hit a blistering knock of 51 off 28 balls which kept them on track. India needed 20 off the final over and 6 runs off the final ball, but Rohit Sharma could manage only 14 runs and eventually Bangladesh won by 5 runs.

=== 3rd ODI ===
10 December 2022
12:00 (D/N)
Scorecard

India; 409/8 (50 overs)	v	Bangladesh; 182 (34 overs)
Ishan Kishan 210 (131); Shakib Al Hasan 2/68 (10 overs)		Shakib Al Hasan 43 (50); Shardul Thakur 3/30 (5 overs)

India won by 227 runs
Zohur Ahmed Chowdhury Stadium, Chittagong
Umpires: Michael Gough (Eng) and Gazi Sohel (Ban)
Player of the match: Ishan Kishan (Ind)

- Bangladesh won the toss and elected to field.
- Ishan Kishan (Ind) scored his maiden and also the fastest ODI double-hundred off 126 balls. He becomes the first cricketer to convert his maiden hundred into a double ton. He was also the youngest (24 years 145 days) and least experienced player (9 ODIs) to get a double ton in ODIs.
- Virat Kohli (Ind) scored his 72nd century in international cricket, and surpassed Ricky Ponting's record of the second-most centuries scored across formats in international cricket.
- This was Shikhar Dhawan's last international match.

== Test series ==
=== 1st Test ===
14–18 December 2022
Scorecard

India	v	Bangladesh
404 (133.5 overs); Cheteshwar Pujara 90 (203); Mehidy Hasan 4/112 (31.5 overs)		150 (55.5 overs); Mushfiqur Rahim 28 (58); Kuldeep Yadav 5/40 (16 overs)
258/2d (61.4 overs); Shubman Gill 110 (152); Khaled Ahmed 1/51 (13 overs)		324 (113.2 overs); Zakir Hasan 100 (224); Axar Patel 3/77 (32.2 overs)

India won by 188 runs
Zohur Ahmed Chowdhury Stadium, Chittagong
Umpires: Michael Gough (Eng) and Sharfuddoula (Ban)
Player of the match: Kuldeep Yadav (Ind)

- India won the toss and elected to bat.
- Zakir Hasan (Ban) made his Test debut.
- Shubman Gill (Ind) scored his maiden century in Test cricket.
- Zakir Hasan (Ban) became the fourth Bangladeshi batter to score a century on Test debut.
- World Test Championship points: India 12, Bangladesh 0.

=== 2nd Test ===
22–26 December 2022 (Note: While five days of play were scheduled for each Test, the second Test reached a result in four days.)
Scorecard

Bangladesh	v	India
227 (73.5 overs); Mominul Haque 84 (157); Umesh Yadav 4/25 (15 overs)		314 (86.3 overs); Rishabh Pant 93 (105); Taijul Islam 4/74 (25 overs)
231 (70.2 overs); Liton Das 73 (98); Axar Patel 3/68 (19.2 overs)		145/7 (47 overs); Ravichandran Ashwin 42* (62); Mehidy Hasan 5/63 (19 overs)

India won by 3 wickets
Sher-e-Bangla National Cricket Stadium, Mirpur
Umpires: Chris Brown (NZ) and Sharfuddoula (Ban)
Player of the match: Ravichandran Ashwin (Ind)

- Bangladesh won the toss and elected to bat.
- Only 81.5 overs of play was possible on day 1 due to poor lighting.
- Jaydev Unadkat (Ind) appeared in a Test match after 12 years and 2 days. In between his 2 Test appearances, he missed 118 tests, second most by any player and the most by any Indian player.
- Cheteshwar Pujara became the eighth Indian batter to complete 7000 test runs
- World Test Championship points: India 12, Bangladesh 0.
