= Tejas Patel (cricketer) =

Indian cricketer (born 1995)

Personal information
- Full name: Tejaskumar Rajendrakumar Patel
- Born: 21 November 1995 (age 30); Valsad, Gujarat, India
- Batting: Right-handed
- Bowling: Right arm medium

Domestic team information
- Years: Team
- 2019–present: Gujarat
- Source: Cricinfo, 21 February 2019

Tejas Patel (born 21 November 1995) is an Indian cricketer. He made his Twenty20 debut for Gujarat in the 2018–19 Syed Mushtaq Ali Trophy on 21 February 2019. He made his List A debut on 3 October 2019, for Gujarat in the 2019–20 Vijay Hazare Trophy. He made his first-class debut on 3 January 2020, for Gujarat in the 2019–20 Ranji Trophy.
