= Ashish Sehrawat =

Indian cricketer (born 1995)

Personal information
- Born: 20 January 1995 (age 31); Delhi, India
- Batting: Right-handed
- Source: ESPNcricinfo, 29 November 2016

Ashish Sehrawat (born 20 January 1995) is an Indian first-class cricketer who plays for Railways. He made his first-class debut for Railways in the 2016–17 Ranji Trophy on 29 November 2016. He made his List A debut on 25 September 2019, for Railways in the 2019–20 Vijay Hazare Trophy.
