= Nikku Singh =

Indian cricketer (born 1995)

Personal information
- Born: 12 October 1995 (age 31)

Domestic team information
- Years: Team
- 2019: Bihar
- Source: ESPNcricinfo, 30 September 2019

Nikku Singh (born 12 October 1995) is an Indian cricketer. He made his List A debut on 30 September 2019, for Bihar in the 2019–20 Vijay Hazare Trophy.
