= Rohan Kumar =

Indian cricketer (born 1996)

Personal information
- Born: 8 September 1996 (age 30)

Domestic team information
- Years: Team
- 2019: Bihar
- Source: Cricinfo, 25 September 2019

Rohan Kumar (born 8 September 1996) is an Indian cricketer. He made his List A debut on 25 September 2019, for Bihar in the 2019–20 Vijay Hazare Trophy.
