= Utkarsh Bhaskar =

Indian cricketer (born 1999)

Personal information
- Born: 21 July 1999 (age 27)

Domestic team information
- Years: Team
- 2018-present: Bihar
- Source: Cricinfo, 28 November 2018

Utkarsh Bhaskar (born 21 July 1999) is an Indian cricketer. He made his first-class debut for Bihar in the 2018–19 Ranji Trophy on 28 November 2018. He made his List A debut on 7 October 2019, for Bihar in the 2019–20 Vijay Hazare Trophy.
