= Kumar Aditya =

Indian cricketer (born 1992)

Personal information
- Full name: Kumar Aditya
- Born: 6 March 1992 (age 34); Saharsa, India
- Batting: Right handed
- Bowling: Right-arm medium
- Role: Batting all-rounder

Domestic team information
- Years: Team
- 2019-present: Bihar
- Source: ESPNcricinfo, 7 January 2019

Kumar Aditya (born 6 March 1992) is an Indian cricketer. He made his first-class debut for Bihar in the 2018–19 Ranji Trophy on 7 January 2019. He made his List A debut on 28 September 2019, for Bihar in the 2019–20 Vijay Hazare Trophy.
