= Ludo King =

Free-to-play video game application

- Developer: Gametion
- Publisher: Gametion
- Producer: Vikash Jaiswal
- Engine: Unity
- Platforms: iOS; macOS; Android; Windows 10 Mobile; Windows Phone 8; Windows 10; Android TV
- Release: 20 February 2016
- Genre: Board game
- Mode: Multiplayer

Ludo King is an Indian free-to-play mobile game application developed by Gametion Technologies Pvt Ltd, a game studio based in Navi Mumbai, India. Gametion is owned by Vikash Jaiswal. The game is developed on the Unity game engine and is available on Android, iOS, Kindle, Windows Phone and Microsoft Windows platforms. The game is a modernization of the board game Ludo, which is based on the ancient Indian game of Pachisi.

Ludo King was released on February 20, 2016, on the Apple App Store, and since then it has consistently ranked No. 1 in the Top Free Games Section of both the Apple App Store and the Google Play Store. It is the first Indian gaming app to cross 1 billion downloads. In 2021, Ludo King was being played in 30 countries and was available in 15 languages.

== Gameplay ==
The objective of the game is to move 4 tokens from the starting point around the board to the center of the board, also known as home. The first person to do this wins the game.

Ludo King has four modes: vs Computer, Local Mode (i.e. pass and play), Online Multiplayer (play with other players around the world) and Private Multiplayer (play with friends in private rooms). In the vs Computer mode, the player can play offline against the computer AI; in Local Mode, multiple players can play together offline; in Online Multiplayer, users can play with other players online but have no choice over who their players are; and in Private Multiplayer, a user can play with multiple players online and can choose the other players. Here, the players can choose to play with their Facebook friends on the online mode, and can play with up to 6 players in the local multiplayer mode.

== Development of Ludo King ==
Before Ludo King, Gametion primarily focused on developing browser games for desktop users. In 2013, the company shifted focus to mobile gaming. It published several games, including Snakes and Ladders and Baby's Big Adventure, but these were all average. The company rose to prominence with the release of Ludo King.

In September 2019, Ludo King rolled out an update which included a series of new themes such as Nature, Egyptian, Disco, Cake, Candy, and Pinball, etc.

Ludo King added 7 Up Down, a sub-game within the game, in addition to the Snakes & Ladders in-game.

In August 2020, Ludo King added the Voice Chat feature and a feature to send E-Greetings.

Ludo King is available in 15 languages – English, Bengali, Tamil, Malayalam, Bahasa Indonesia, German, Spanish, Hindi, Gujarati, Telugu, Kannada, French, Arabic, Marathi and Italian.

Ludo King introduced a new mode called Rush Ludo, which is a faster version of the game.

In January 2021, Ludo King launched a 6 player online multiplayer mode and Quick Mode. Ludo King also has released a five and six-player online feature.

Ludo King used the third-party mLab platform for hosting. However, after mLab was acquired by MongoDB Inc, the game moved to MongoDB Atlas, the global cloud database service.

Ludo King also utilizes Amazon Web Services (AWS), and Flentas Technologies, an AWS Partner Network Partner, to "build an internal multiplayer backend system to manage its increasing user traffic more efficiently and in a cost-effective manner."

Google Launched Google Play Points Program in India and Ludo King is one of the partnering game apps for the program.

Google launched Google Play Games beta on PC in India which will let users play Ludo King on PC.

Ludo King was released on Netflix games, a part of Netflix's mobile gaming lineup, with all the available features without in-app purchases.

== Demographics ==
According to POKKT, a mobile video advertising platform in India, Ludo King is one of the most popular games in India. The game has a DAU (Daily Active Users) of 10 million and 70 million monthly users. Since May 2017, Ludo King has topped the Google Play download charts. By September 2017, the game had been downloaded 120 million times, about 70% of which, i.e. around 100 million, are in India, followed by Indonesia, Pakistan, Nepal, Saudi Arabia, and Brazil.

Gametion's top markets include India, Indonesia, Bangladesh, Egypt, Pakistan, Tunisia, and the USA.

Ludo King crossed 500 million downloads by December 2020.

According to the India Times website, "[Ludo King] attracted a new demographic of players (45 years and older) that had been relatively lower in India and turned gaming into mainstream entertainment and a social media alternative." This is primarily because Ludo King is available in local languages like Hindi, Gujarati, Marathi, etc., thus attempting to target a large local audience.

Ludo King crossed 1 billion downloads in 2024, becoming one of the top played board games in the world.

== Reception ==
Since Ludo King's launch on February 20, 2016, by May 2017, the game had been downloaded 50 million times on Android phones. The game is played "mostly by 18-35-year-olds but also retirees. And on average, a player spends 15-16 minutes a day on the game." In 2016, Ludo King recorded four million installs and went up to 57 million in 2017, crossing 118 million in 2018.

Ludo King was the first Indian gaming application to pass 100 million downloads.

In April 2018, in lieu of the Facebook–Cambridge Analytica data scandal, Ludo King was noted as being one of the fair apps among the top 5 apps on Google Play in India that did not seek excessive permissions on devices.

According to Vishal Gondal, founder of GOQii, Ludo King is one of the very few successful Indian games that is completely original and not "reskinned."

Ludo King has gained significant popularity owing to its "local multiplayer aspect," which allows up to six individuals to engage in gameplay on a single device, with each player possessing their own dice. Notably, the game has managed to reach and resonate with lower socio-economic strata, who had previously shown little interest in digital gaming.

Casual and hyper-casual games, like Ludo King, are "light on the gamer's system and have simple mechanics. They can be learnt through a short tutorial, or none, even by beginners. Also, quick progress gives a rapid sense of achievement, encouraging the gamer to jump from level to level."

By January 2020, Ludo King has been downloaded 300 million times, with 6 million daily active users and 75 million playing a month. Users spend about 45 minutes on average playing Ludo King.

Ludo King saw a 50-75% boost in audience during India's COVID-19 Lockdown, reaching the Top 5 Downloaded Apps in India between 25 March and 10 April 2020, with 9.5 million downloads. Ludo King's daily download figures changed from 150,000 in early February to over 450,000 in India by April 13, 2020. It saw a 142% jump in downloads between February and April 2020. In April alone, the game garnered 26 million downloads.

According to an AppsFlyer report, Ludo King saw a 100% surge in gaming during the Lockdown. The daily average time spent on the game increased from 32 minutes to 49 minutes. News18 reported that Ludo King had a "five-fold increase in traffic during the lockdown. It has more than 330 million downloads, with about 50 million daily active users." In May 2020, it was the sixth most downloaded game worldwide and its revenue was about $922,000 worldwide. In the beginning of May 2020, Ludo King had 251 million daily active users; the number averaged 40 to 45 million by June 2020. Gametion had to increase the server base from 8 to 200 servers to keep up with demand.

According to Sensor Tower, Ludo King saw 48.3 million downloads between April and June 2020, beating other popular games like PUBG Mobile, which ranked 3rd with 30.8 million downloads. According to Craig Chapple, Mobile Insights Strategist, Sensor Tower, "In February, the title generated 10.8 million downloads, while in April it accumulated 26 million downloads, an increase of 140.7%." Ludo King was one of the top 5 most-installed mobile games worldwide.

Ludo King originally had 80%-20% proportion for Advertising and In-App Purchase (IAP) revenues, which changed to 60%-40% for Advertising and IAP revenues, respectively by June 2020. About 50% of the revenue comes from India and 50% from outside of India, countries such as Indonesia, Bangladesh, Saudi Arabia, UAE, Germany, the US and UK. The app gets "maximum traffic between 2:00 and 4:00 p.m. during the day, and 8:00-11:00 p.m.". 75% of the audience is from India.

Ludo King crossed 400 million downloads on 16 June 2020.

According to data by Sensor Tower, Ludo King registered 1.52 million downloads between September 2 and September 5, 2020, across iOS and Android app stores, making it the second most downloaded game during that time. This boost came after the Indian government announced the ban on 118 Chinese apps, including PUBG Mobile. Ludo King was also the 7th most downloaded game on Google Play Store in August 2020.

According to Inc42, Ludo King is currently the most downloaded mobile game in India with 10.3 million downloads during the month of September 2020.

Ludo King crossed 500 million downloads by December 2020.

By the end of 2020, Ludo King had 32 million daily active users (DAUs), an increase from 15 million, while its monthly average users (MAUs) rose from 110 to 142 million. Due to the increase in the number of downloads and user interest in the game, Gametion Technologies, the parent company of Ludo King has earned $20 million in revenue in 2020.

In 2021, Ludo King expects 5-10x jump in in-app transactions.

Another Sensor Tower report states that "Ludo King was the most downloaded game in [the] Asia region in the mobile gaming market, driven by its popularity in India. Interestingly, India accounted for nearly 80% of Ludo King’s global downloads in Q2 2021."

Currently, Google Play Store has rated this game 4.2 stars.

According to App Annie, Ludo King was the most popular game in India in H1 2021 by downloads. App Annie further listed Ludo King as the "top game in India in terms of overall downloads" for the whole of 2021.

According to a Google Play Partnerships Vice-president Purnima Kochikar, "Ludo King has become one of the most-played games globally." She further stated that, "Indian apps and games saw a 200% increase in active monthly users on Google Play compared to 2019."

According to a Sensor Tower report, Ludo King ranked either first or second in each quarter of 2021 on the Google Play Store.

According to Business Today magazine, Ludo King, a lockdown sensation crossed 800 million global installs in June 2022 and turned into a mainstream alternative and a social interaction tool.

42matters reported that Ludo King has ranked among the top ‘Board’ games in 139 countries worldwide.

According to Sensor Tower, Ludo King was among the top 5 most installed mobile games worldwide for the month of April 2022.

Google Play's best apps and games of 2022 in India - Play Store featured Ludo King in the "Best Ongoing" games category for engaging players with new compelling updates, fresh content, and advanced gameplay experience.

State of India Gaming Report 2022 states that 48% of non-gamers chose casual games like Ludo King as their most preferred game category to play in the future.

As per gaming trends, Ludo King remains one of the top popular games among Indian players in 2024 for its simplicity, social gameplay, and accessibility across many platforms.

Ludo King ranked among top 3 games by downloads in September 2024.

== In popular culture ==
It was reported that while shooting for his film, Zero, Indian actor, Shah Rukh Khan enjoyed playing Ludo King with director, Aanand L. Rai, and co-star, Anushka Sharma.

Ludo King was one of the featured games at India's first ever mobile eSports event held at the CII's India Gaming Show in January 2018.

In November 2020, Ludo King signed on Bollywood actor Sonu Sood as game ambassador.

== Awards ==
1. Ludo King won the Mobile & Tablet Game: Arcade/Casual (International) in Gaming at the 19th FICCI Frames Best Animated Frames (BAF) Awards.
2. Ludo King was selected as Best Casual Game of 2018 on Google Play Store by popular vote.
3. According to the Google's annual Year in Search: Insights for Brands report, Ludo King was in the Top 3 downloaded games in India in 2018.
4. Ludo King was named "No.1 Game of India" by MidDay.
5. Gametion Technologies earned the ET Startup Award 2020, with recognition as the Bootstrap Champ of 2020.
6. Apple App Store listed Ludo King in the list of 21 apps for 2021
7. Gametion Technologies ranked Number 1 in the category of "Top 10 India Headquartered Games Publishers" in the Top Published Awards 2021 by App Annie.
8. According to App Annie, Ludo King was Number 1 in its list of Most downloaded mobile games in India in 2020.
9. According to AppAnnie, Gametion was the number one Indian game publisher in terms of downloads.
10. As of April 2021, Ludo King ranks among the Top 10 games downloaded on Google Play Store.
11. Ludo King received the "Ludo King - The Most Popular Game Of The Year" award at the India Gaming Awards 2022.
