= Mahesh Saheba =

Indian cricketer

Mahesh Saheba (5 September 1932 – 18 March 2006) was an Indian cricketer. He was a right-handed batsman who played for Gujarat. He was born in Ahmedabad and died in Gujarat.

Saheba made a single first-class appearance for the side, during the 1960–61 season, against Maharashtra. From the opening order, he scored 12 runs in the only innings in which he batted.

Saheba's brother, Ashok, and son Amish played first-class cricket, while his nephew Samrat, played one-day cricket.
