= Kamlesh Kumar =

Indian cricketer (born 1992)

Personal information
- Born: 26 December 1992 (age 33)

Domestic team information
- Years: Team
- 2019: Bihar
- Source: ESPNcricinfo, 25 September 2019

Kamlesh Kumar (born 26 December 1992) is an Indian cricketer. He made his List A debut on 25 September 2019, for Bihar in the 2019–20 Vijay Hazare Trophy.
