= Amit Kuila =

Indian cricketer (born 1995)

Personal information
- Full name: Amit Sahdev Kuila
- Born: 9 July 1995 (age 31); Midnapur, West Bengal, India
- Source: ESPNcricinfo, 6 April 2016

Amit Kuila (born 9 July 1995) is an Indian cricketer. He plays Twenty20 cricket for Bengal. He made his first-class debut for Bengal in the 2016–17 Ranji Trophy on 20 October 2016, taking five wickets in the first innings. He made his List A debut on 25 September 2019, for Railways in the 2019–20 Vijay Hazare Trophy.

== See also ==
- List of Bengal cricketers
