= Roosh Kalaria =

Indian cricketer (born 1993)

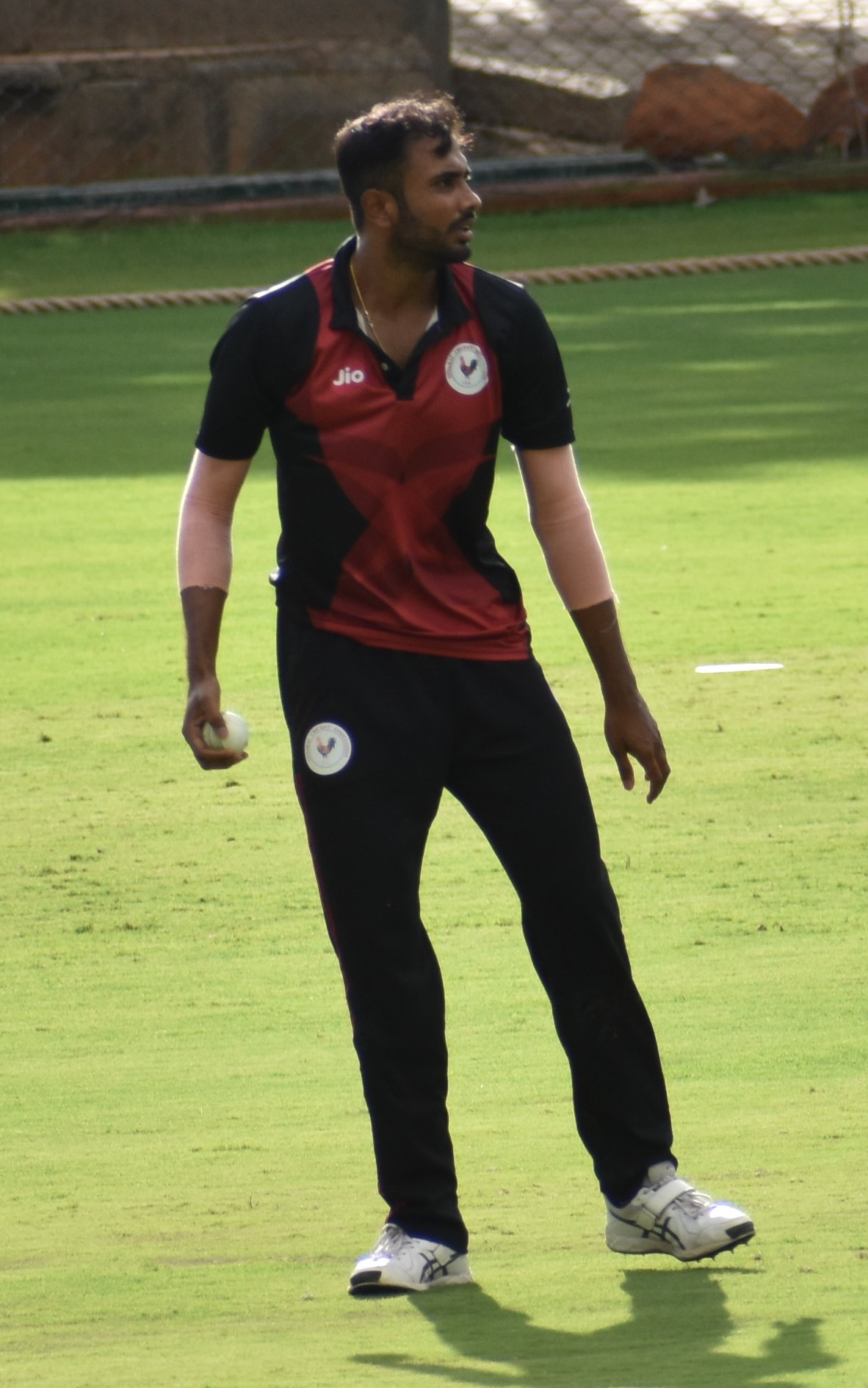
- Kalaria during the 2019–20 Vijay Hazare Trophy

Personal information
- Full name: Roosh Bipinbhai Kalaria
- Born: 16 January 1993 (age 33); Rajkot, Gujarat, India
- Batting: Right-handed
- Bowling: Left-arm medium-fast
- Role: Bowler

Domestic team information
- Years: Team
- 2012–present: Gujarat

Career statistics
Competition	FC	LA	T20
Matches	9	6	2
Runs scored	325	37	0
Batting average	27.08	18.50	0.00
100s/50s	1/0	0/0	0/0
Top score	100	21	0
Balls bowled	1762	295	36
Wickets	25	10	1
Bowling average	28.68	22.40	22.40
5 wickets in innings	1	0	0
10 wickets in match	0	0	0
Best bowling	5/32	4/21	1/14
Catches/stumpings	3/–	1/–	1/–
- Source: Cricinfo, 12 November 2013

Roosh Bipinbhai Kalaria (born 16 January 1993) is an Indian cricketer. He is a right-handed batsman and left-arm medium-fast bowler who plays for Gujarat in domestic cricket. He has played for the India Under-19 cricket team in the 2012 ICC Under-19 Cricket World Cup.

He was the leading wicket-taker for Gujarat in the 2018–19 Ranji Trophy, with 27 dismissals in eight matches. In the quarter-final match against Kerala, he took a hat-trick. In October 2019, he was named in India B's squad for the 2019–20 Deodhar Trophy.
