= Ananta Saha =

Indian cricketer (born 1996)

Personal information
- Born: 12 September 1996 (age 30); Kolkata, Bengal
- Batting: Right-handed
- Bowling: Right arm medium

Domestic team information
- Years: Team
- 2019–20: Railways
- Source: ESPNcricinfo, 6 October 2019

Ananta Saha (born 12 September 1996) is an Indian cricketer. He made his List A debut on 6 October 2019, for Railways in the 2019–20 Vijay Hazare Trophy. He made his Twenty20 debut on 5 November 2021, for Railways in the 2021–22 Syed Mushtaq Ali Trophy.
