= Azim Kazi =

Indian cricketer (born 1993)

Personal information
- Full name: Azim Nazir Kazi
- Born: 14 October 1993 (age 33); Ahmednagar, Maharashtra, India
- Batting: Left-handed
- Bowling: Slow left arm orthodox
- Role: All-rounder

Domestic team information
- Years: Team
- 2019–present: Maharashtra
- Source: ESPNcricinfo, 22 February 2019

Azim Kazi (born 14 October 1993) is an Indian cricketer who represents Maharashtra in domestic cricket. He is a left-arm orthodox bowler and a left handed lower order batter.

He made his Twenty20 debut for Maharashtra in the 2018–19 Syed Mushtaq Ali Trophy on 22 February 2019. He made his List A debut on 7 October 2019, for Maharashtra in the 2019–20 Vijay Hazare Trophy. He made his first-class debut on 9 December 2019, for Maharashtra in the 2019–20 Ranji Trophy.
