= Ayan Bhattacharjee =

Indian cricketer (born 1991)

Personal information
- Full name: Ayan Pijush Bhattacharjee
- Born: 17 July 1991 (age 35); Kalighat, West Bengal
- Batting: Left-handed
- Bowling: Right-arm medium
- Role: bowler

Domestic team information
- Years: Team
- 2016/17–2019/20: Bengal
- Source: ESPNcricinfo, 22 October 2016

Ayan Pijush Bhattacharjee (born 17 July 1991) is an Indian cricketer who played for Bengal from 2016/17 to 2019/20. Born in Kalighat, West Bengal, he is a right arm seam bowler of medium pace and a left-handed batter. Ayan made his first-class debut in the 2016–17 Ranji Trophy on 20 October 2016. He made his Twenty20 debut for Mizoram in the 2018–19 Syed Mushtaq Ali Trophy on 27 February 2019. He made his List A debut on 7 October 2019, for Bengal in the 2019–20 Vijay Hazare Trophy.
