= List of international cricket five-wicket hauls by Shakib Al Hasan =

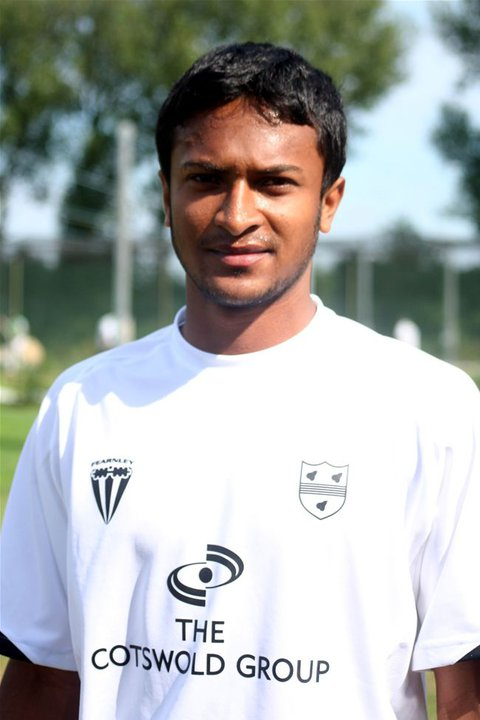
Shakib Al Hasan, Bangladesh's leading wicket taker in international cricket, has taken 25 five-wicket hauls in international cricket.

In cricket, a five-wicket haul (also known as a "five–for" or "fifer") refers to a bowler taking five or more wickets in a single innings. This is regarded as a notable achievement, and as of October 2024, only 54 bowlers have taken 15 or more five-wicket hauls at international level in their cricketing careers. Shakib Al Hasan, a slow left-arm orthodox spinner, represents the Bangladesh national cricket team. With 25 five-wicket hauls across all formats of international cricket, he ranks equal 15th in the all-time list, and first among his countrymen He has been described as "Bangladesh's greatest-ever cricketer", and is ranked as the top all-rounder in One Day International (ODI) cricket as of August 2022.

Shakib's first five-wicket haul came against New Zealand during the first Test of the 2008–09 home series; he took seven wickets for 36 runs in New Zealand's first innings. As of March 2023, it remains his best bowling figures in Test cricket. He ended the year with three more five-wicket hauls, which came in consecutive innings against South Africa and Sri Lanka. In Test cricket, he is among the four bowlers who have taken five-wicket hauls against all Test-playing nations. (Note: The others being Muttiah Muralitharan, Rangana Herath and Dale Steyn.)

Shakib made his ODI debut in 2007, a year before his first Test appearance. He has taken four five-wicket hauls in the format. His best figures in the format are five wickets for 29 runs which came against Afghanistan during the 2019 World Cup.

Shakib is one of the thirteen cricketers to have a five wicket-haul across all three formats. (Note: The other players are Tim Southee, Lasith Malinga, Ajantha Mendis, Bhuvneshwar Kumar, Umar Gul, Imran Tahir, Kuldeep Yadav, Rashid Khan, Jason Holder, Lungi Ngidi, Alzarri Joseph and Hasan Ali.)

== Key ==
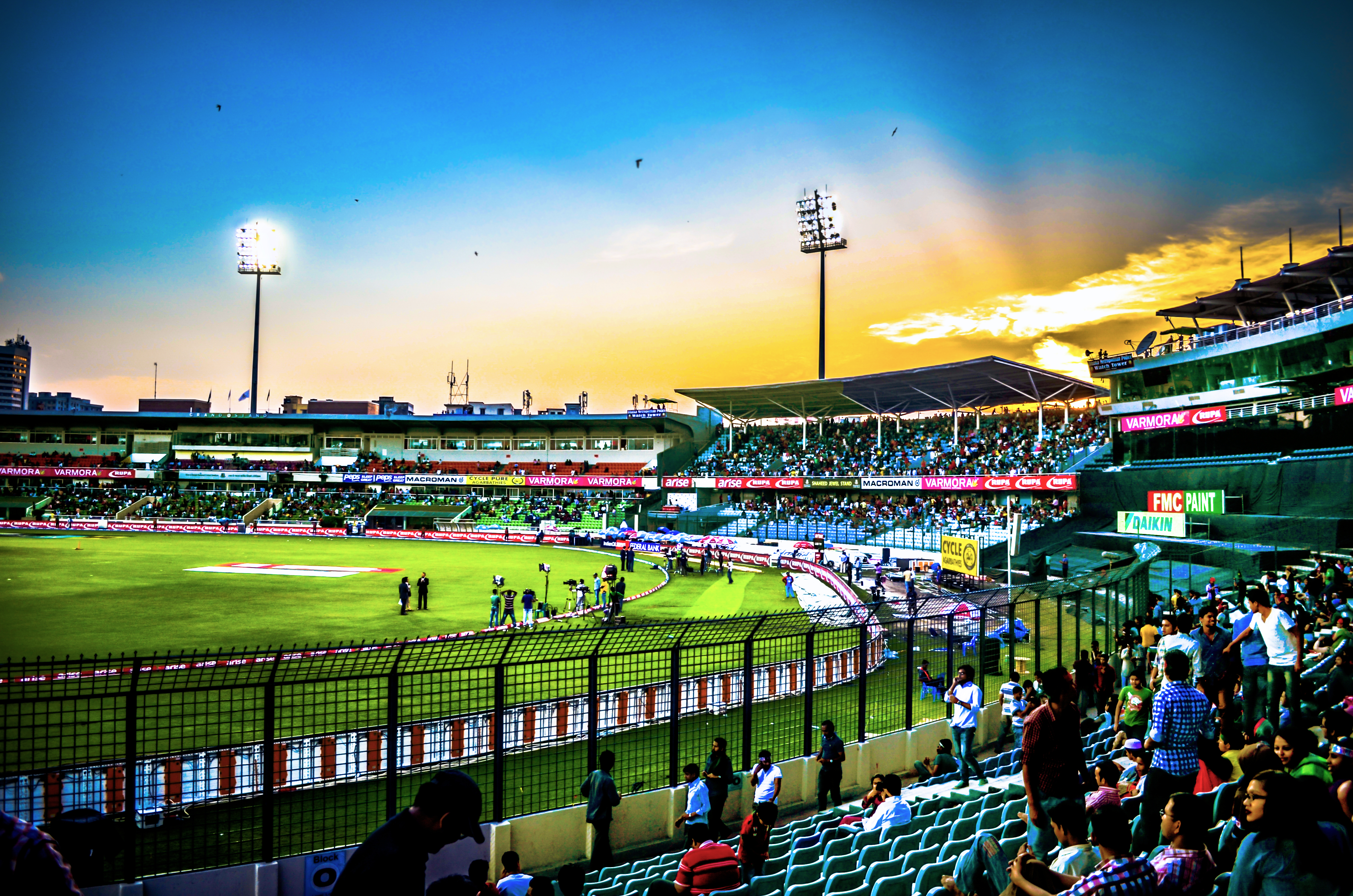
Shakib has taken eleven of his twenty-five five-wicket hauls at the Sher-e-Bangla National Cricket Stadium

Key
Symbol	Meaning
Date	Day the Test started or ODI held
Inn	Innings in which five-wicket haul was taken
Overs	Number of overs bowled
Runs	Number of runs conceded
Wkts	Number of wickets taken
Econ	Runs conceded per over
Batsmen	Batsmen whose wickets were taken
Result	Result for the Bangladesh team
*	One of two five-wicket hauls by Shakib in a match
†	10 or more wickets taken in the match
‡	Shakib was selected as man of the match

== Tests ==
Five-wicket hauls in Test cricket by Shakib Al Hasan
No.	Date	Ground	Against	Inn	Overs	Runs	Wkts	Econ	Batsmen	Result
1	17 October 2008	Zahur Ahmed Chowdhury Stadium, Chittagong	New Zealand	2	25.5	36	7	1.39	Aaron Redmond; Jamie How; Jesse Ryder; Brendon McCullum; Jacob Oram; Kyle Mills; Iain O'Brien	Lost
2	19 November 2008	Mangaung Oval, Bloemfontein	South Africa	1	38	130	5	3.42	Jacques Kallis; AB de Villiers; Mark Boucher; Morne Morkel; Dale Steyn	Lost
3	26 November 2008	SuperSport Park, Centurion	South Africa	2	28	99	6	3.53	Jacques Kallis; Hashim Amla; AB de Villiers; Mark Boucher; Morne Morkel; Monde Zondeki	Lost
4	26 December 2008 ‡	Sher-e-Bangla National Stadium, Mirpur	Sri Lanka	1	28.4	70	5	2.44	Kumar Sangakkara; Mahela Jayawardene; Tillakaratne Dilshan; Dhammika Prasad; Thilan Samaraweera	Lost
5	17 July 2009 ‡	National Cricket Stadium, St. George's	West Indies	3	24.5	70	5	2.81	Dale Richards; Omar Phillips; Ryan Hinds; Chadwick Walton; Tino Best	Won
6	17 January 2010	Zahur Ahmed Chowdhury Stadium, Chittagong	India	1	29.5	62	5	2.07	Virender Sehwag; VVS Laxman; Yuvraj Singh; Zaheer Khan; Sreesanth	Lost
7	4 June 2010	Old Trafford Cricket Ground, Manchester	England	1	37.3	121	5	3.22	Kevin Pietersen; Ian Bell; Ajmal Shahzad; Matt Prior; Steven Finn	Lost
8	29 October 2011	Sher-e-Bangla National Stadium, Mirpur	West Indies	1	34.4	63	5	1.81	Kemar Roach; Carlton Baugh; Darren Sammy; Kirk Edwards; Fidel Edwards	Lost
9	17 December 2011 ‡	Sher-e-Bangla National Stadium, Mirpur	Pakistan	2	40.5	82	6	2.00	Azhar Ali; Misbah-ul-Haq; Abdur Rehman; Umar Gul; Saeed Ajmal; Adnan Akmal	Lost
10	21 October 2013	Sher-e-Bangla National Stadium, Mirpur	New Zealand	2	43.0	103	5	2.39	Hamish Rutherford; Peter Fulton; Brendon McCullum; Ross Taylor; Doug Bracewell	Drawn
11	4 February 2014	Zahur Ahmed Chowdhury Stadium, Chittagong	Sri Lanka	1	34.0	148	5	4.35	Dinesh Chandimal; Angelo Mathews; Dilruwan Perera; Ajantha Mendis; Suranga Lakmal	Drawn
12	25 October 2014	Sher-e-Bangla National Stadium, Mirpur	Zimbabwe	1	24.5	59	6	2.37	Hamilton Masakadza; Elton Chigumbura; Regis Chakabva; John Nyumbu; Tinashe Panyangara; Tafadzwa Kamungozi	Won
13	3 November 2014 * † ‡	Sheikh Abu Naser Stadium, Khulna	Zimbabwe	2	41	80	5	1.95	Brendan Taylor; Craig Ervine; Elton Chigumbura; Hamilton Masakadza; Malcolm Waller	Won
14	3 November 2014 * † ‡	Sheikh Abu Naser Stadium, Khulna	Zimbabwe	4	18	44	5	2.44	Sikandar Raza; Brendan Taylor; Hamilton Masakadza; Elton Chigumbura; Natsai M'shangwe	Won
15	20 October 2016	Zahur Ahmed Chowdhury Stadium, Chittagong	England	3	33	85	5	2.57	Joe Root; Ben Duckett; Moeen Ali; Ben Stokes; Adil Rashid	Lost
16	27 August 2017 * † ‡	Sher-e-Bangla National Stadium, Mirpur	Australia	2	25.5	68	5	2.63	Nathan Lyon; Matt Renshaw; Glenn Maxwell; Pat Cummins; Josh Hazlewood	Won
17	27 August 2017 * † ‡	Sher-e-Bangla National Stadium, Mirpur	Australia	2	28	85	5	3.03	Usman Khawaja; David Warner; Steve Smith; Matthew Wade; Glenn Maxwell	Won
18	12 July 2018	Sabina Park, Kingston	West Indies	2	17	33	6	1.94	Kraigg Brathwaite; Devon Smith; Keemo Paul; Kieran Powell; Miguel Cummins; Shannon Gabriel	Lost
19	23 May 2022	Sher-e-Bangla National Cricket Stadium, Mirpur	Sri Lanka	2	40.1	96	5	2.39	Kusal Mendis; Dimuth Karunaratne; Dhananjaya de Silva; Niroshan Dickwella; Praveen Jayawickrama	Lost

== ODIs ==
Five-wicket hauls in ODIs by Shakib Al Hasan
No.	Date	Ground	Against	Inn	Overs	Runs	Wkts	Econ	Batsmen	Result
1	7 November 2015 ‡	Sher-e-Bangla National Stadium, Mirpur	Zimbabwe	2	10	47	5	4.70	Chamu Chibhabha; Craig Ervine; Sean Williams; Graeme Cremer; Tinashe Panyangara	Won
2	24 June 2019 ‡	Rose Bowl, Southampton	Afghanistan	2	10	29	5	2.90	Rahmat Shah; Gulbadin Naib; Mohammad Nabi; Asghar Afghan; Najibullah Zadran	Won
3	16 July 2021	Harare Sports Club, Harare	Zimbabwe	2	9.5	30	5	3.05	Brendan Taylor; Ryan Burl; Blessing Muzarabani; Regis Chakabva; Richard Ngarava	Won
4	4 December 2022	Sher-e-Bangla National Stadium, Mirpur	India	1	10	36	5	3.60	Rohit Sharma; Virat Kohli; Washington Sundar; Shardul Thakur; Deepak Chahar	Won

== T20Is ==
Five-wicket hauls in T20Is by Shakib Al Hasan
No.	Date	Ground	Against	Inn	Overs	Runs	Wkts	Econ	Batsmen	Result	Ref
1	20 December 2018 ‡	Sher-e-Bangla National Stadium, Mirpur	West Indies	2	4	20	5	5.00	Nicholas Pooran; Shimron Hetmyer; Darren Bravo; Carlos Brathwaite; Fabian Allen	Won	
2	29 March 2023 ‡	Zohur Ahmed Chowdhury Stadium, Chittagong	Ireland	2	4	22	5	5.50	Lorcan Tucker; Ross Adair; Gareth Delany; George Dockrell; Harry Tector	Won	
