= Vikash Jaiswal =

Indian entrepreneur

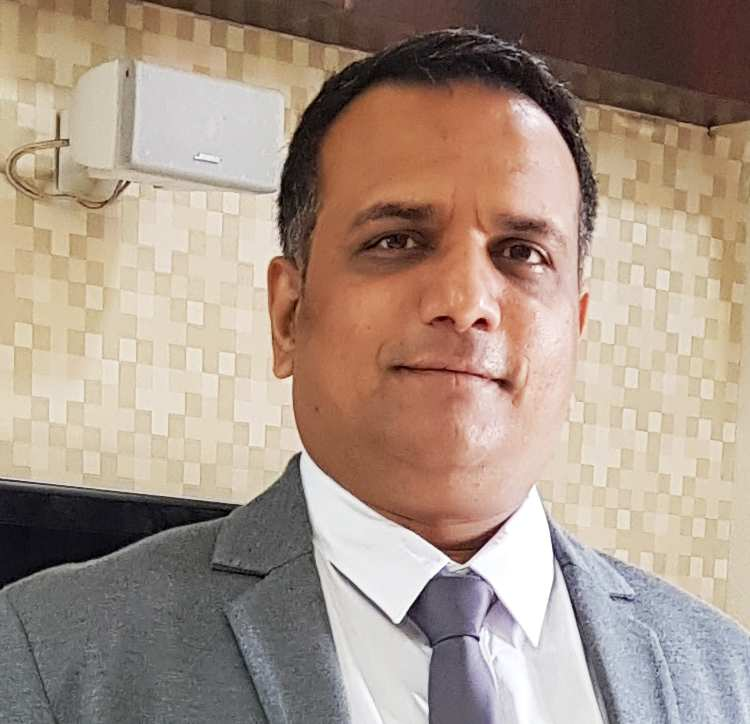
- Born: Patna (Bihar)
- Citizenship: Indian
- Education: Bachelor of Engineering in Computer Science from Marathwada Institute of Technology, Bulandshahr (MIT BSR)
- Occupations: Founder and CEO of Gametion
- Known for: Creator of Ludo King

Vikash Jaiswal is an Indian entrepreneur. He is the founder and CEO of Gametion Technologies Pvt. Ltd. and creator of Ludo King, a mobile game developed by Gametion for Android and iOS.

At the ET Brand Equity Gaming Summit in 2021, Jaiswal asked the Indian government to support the game development industry within the country. According to Jaiswal, there should be "specialised courses focusing on game development under related streams like computer science or engineering."

== Early life ==
Vikash Jaiswal was born in Patna, Bihar.

During his childhood, Jaiswal played video games in local gaming parlours, including Nintendo's Mario games and Road Fighter. He also made handmade greeting cards that were sold through a local stationery shop.

Jaiswal pursued his Bachelor of Engineering in Computer Science from MIT, Bulandshahar. As part of his thesis, he created a video game called ‘Eggy Boy’, a seven level jump game like ‘Mario’, which was named PCQuest magazine's ‘Game of the Month’ for July 2003. He also took up animation, graphic design, and 3D classes in Patna while pursuing his bachelor's degree.

In 2003, Jaiswal graduated from MIT, and moved to Mumbai. He started working as a tech lead for Indiagames Ltd.

== Gametion ==
In 2008, Jaiswal quit his job and started his own game development venture, Gametion, with an investment of ₹2.5 lakh and a team of seven. Gametion initially created browser games, and later it shifted to mobile game development for Android and iOS. Most of these original games were published on "oneonlinegames.com."

Gametion was co-founded with Soni Kumari, who serves as Managing Director.

In 2019, Gametion participated in the International Game Developers Conference (IGDC), a game development conference held in South Asia.

== Ludo King ==
In October 2015, Jaiswal came up with the idea for Ludo King, after coming across a Snakes and Ladders game app. Jaiswal developed the game with one programmer and one graphic designer.

Ludo King was launched in December 2016 and reached the top charts in May 2017. By November 2017, the game had 120 million users worldwide, of which 'around 100 million were in India, followed by Indonesia, Pakistan, Nepal, Saudi Arabia, Brazil.'

Talking about Ludo King, Jaiswal said, "It was all luck with Ludo King...But I always thought that I would be able to list my game in the list of top charts.” He was sure that the game would "come in the top 10 rankings of the board games category in India.”

Ludo King has won numerous awards including the Mobile & Tablet Game: Arcade/Casual (International) in Gaming at the 19th FICCI FRAMES Best Animated Frames (BAF) Awards. Ludo King was also selected as Best Casual Game of 2018 on Google Play Store by popular vote. Ludo King was also listed in the Top 3 downloaded games in India in 2018, according to the Google's annual Year in Search: Insights for Brands report. The app was named "No. 1 Game of India" by MidDay, while the Apple app store listed Ludo King in the list of 21 apps for 2021. Ludo King is the first Indian gaming app to cross 1 billion downloads on Google Play Store.

By 2025, the game had surpassed 1.5 billion downloads worldwide.

== Awards ==
Jaiswal received the Mobile & Tablet Game: Arcade/ Casual (International) in Gaming for Ludo King at the 19th FICCI FRAMES Best Animated Frames (BAF) Awards.

He has been recognized as "Icons of Navi Mumbai" by the Economic Times group.

Gametion Technologies earned the ET Startup Award 2020, with recognition as a Bootstrap Champ of 2020.

Gametion Technologies ranked Number 1 in the category of "Top 10 India Headquartered Games Publishers" in the Top Published Awards 2021 by App Annie.

Android Developers featured a story on Jaiswal for their YouTube channel.

Jaiswal won the "Marketer of the Year - Gaming" award at the IAA Leadership Awards 2022 for his marketing achievements.

== Investments ==
Jaiswal intends to invest in promising startups in the Gaming Industry.
