= Kuldeep Sen =

Indian cricketer (born 1996)

Personal information
- Full name: Kuldeep Rampal Sen
- Born: 22 October 1996 (age 30); Rewa, Madhya Pradesh, India
- Batting: Right-handed
- Bowling: Right arm fast
- Role: Bowler

International information
- National side: India (2022)
- Only ODI (cap 250): 4 December 2022 v Bangladesh

Domestic team information
- Years: Team
- 2018–2023: Madhya Pradesh
- 2022–2024, 2026: Rajasthan Royals
- 2023–present: Tamil Nadu
- 2025: Punjab Kings

Career statistics
Competition	ODI	FC	LA	T20
Matches	1	22	14	39
Runs scored	2	111	3	2
Batting average	–	6.93	1.00	1.00
100s/50s	0/0	0/0	0/0	0/0
Top score	2*	26	2*	1*
Balls bowled	30	3,210	647	741
Wickets	2	60	27	32
Bowling average	18.50	31.11	22.96	34.50
5 wickets in innings	0	2	1	0
10 wickets in match	0	0	0	0
Best bowling	2/37	5/62	5/36	4/20
Catches/stumpings	0/–	4/–	2/–	6/–
- Source: ESPNcricinfo

Kuldeep Rampal Sen (born 22 October 1996) is an Indian international cricketer who plays for Tamil Nadu in domestic cricket and Rajasthan Royals in the Indian Premier League. He is a right-arm fast bowler who regularly bowls at speeds above 140kmph. He made his international debut in the first ODI of India's tour of Bangladesh in December 2022.

== Early life ==
Kuldeep was born on 22 October 1996 in Hariharpur village in Rewa district of Madhya Pradesh. His father, Ram Pal Sen is a barber. Third of five children, Kuldeep started playing cricket from the age of 8. He is mentored by his coach, Aril Anthony.

== Career ==
Sen made his first-class debut for Madhya Pradesh on 1 November 2018 in the 2018–19 Ranji Trophy. On 21 November 2018, he took his maiden five-wicket haul in first-class cricket, against Punjab. He made his Twenty20 debut for Madhya Pradesh in the 2018–19 Syed Mushtaq Ali Trophy on 24 February 2019. He made his List A debut on 25 September 2019, for Madhya Pradesh in the 2019–20 Vijay Hazare Trophy.

In February 2022, he was bought by the Rajasthan Royals in the auction for the 2022 Indian Premier League tournament.

In September 2022, he was named in the India A squad playing a 3 ODI-series against New Zealand A cricket team.

In November 2022, he was taken as a part of India team for New Zealand 3-ODI series.

In December 2022, he made his debut for the India ODI side, playing against Bangladesh in the first of three matches. He picked two wickets on debut in a low-scoring encounter.

== IPL 2026 ==
Ahead of IPL 2026, Sen rejoined Rajasthan Royals, having played for Punjab Kings in IPL 2025.
