= Uday Kumar Abhay =

Indian cricketer (born 1983)

Personal information
- Full name: Uday Kumar Abhay
- Born: 17 August 1983 (age 43); Aizawl, Mizoram, India
- Source: Cricinfo, 8 November 2019

Uday Kumar Abhay (born 17 August 1983) is an Indian cricketer. He made his Twenty20 debut on 8 November 2019, for Mizoram in the 2019–20 Syed Mushtaq Ali Trophy. He made his first-class debut on 4 February 2020, for Mizoram in the 2019–20 Ranji Trophy.
