= KL Saini Ground =

Cricket ground in Mansarovar, India

KL SAINI Ground, JAIPUR, RAJASTHAN
- Mansarovar Ground; Jaipur District Cricket Association Ground

Ground information
- Location: Mansarovar, Jaipur, Rajasthan
- Country: India
- Establishment: 1990 (first recorded match)
- Capacity: 5,000
- End names
- n/a

Team information
Rajasthan	(1990-)
- As of 2 December 2015

Mansarovar Ground or Jaipur District Cricket Association Ground or KL Saini Ground is situated in Mansarovar area of Jaipur, Rajasthan It is the home ground of the Rajasthan cricket team. It has a capacity of 5,000 people and was opened in 1990.
