= Sandeep Yadav (cricketer) =

Indian cricketer (born 1989)

Personal information
- Born: 15 December 1989 (age 36)
- Source: Cricinfo, 16 October 2019

Sandeep Yadav (born 15 December 1989) is an Indian cricketer. He made his List A debut on 16 October 2019, for Railways in the 2019–20 Vijay Hazare Trophy.
