= Rahul Batham =

Indian cricketer (born 1998)

Personal information
- Full name: Rahul Rajendrakumar Batham
- Born: 21 August 1998 (age 28); Gwalior, Madhya Pradesh, India
- Batting: Right handed
- Bowling: Right arm Medium

Domestic team information
- Years: Team
- 2019/20–present: Madhya Pradesh

Career statistics
Competition	LA	T20
Matches	9	15
Runs scored	55	69
Batting average	11.00	9.85
100s/50s	0/0	0/0
Top score	21	32
Balls bowled	319	256
Wickets	7	11
Bowling average	38.71	27.36
5 wickets in innings	0	0
10 wickets in match	0	0
Best bowling	2/12	3/16
Catches/stumpings	4/–	7/–
- Source: Cricinfo, 27 March 2025

Rahul Batham (born 21 August 1998) is an Indian cricketer. He made his List A debut on 27 September 2019, for Madhya Pradesh in the 2019–20 Vijay Hazare Trophy. Prior to his List A debut, he was named in India's squad for the 2016 Under-19 Cricket World Cup. He made his Twenty20 debut on 18 November 2019, for Madhya Pradesh in the 2019–20 Syed Mushtaq Ali Trophy.
