= Vikash Yadav =

Indian cricketer (born 1988)

Personal information
- Born: 3 February 1988 (age 38)

Domestic team information
- Years: Team
- 2019: Bihar
- Source: Cricinfo, 16 October 2019

Vikash Yadav (born 3 February 1988) is an Indian cricketer. He made his List A debut on 16 October 2019, for Bihar in the 2019–20 Vijay Hazare Trophy.
