= Rishabh Chouhan =

Indian cricketer (born 1999)

Personal information
- Born: 5 September 1999 (age 27); Indore, Madhya Pradesh, India
- Batting: Right-handed
- Bowling: Slow left-arm orthodox
- Source: Cricinfo, 24 February 2019

Rishabh Chouhan (born 5 September 1999) is an Indian cricketer. He made his Twenty20 debut for Madhya Pradesh in the 2018–19 Syed Mushtaq Ali Trophy on 24 February 2019. He made his List A debut on 30 September 2019, for Madhya Pradesh in the 2019–20 Vijay Hazare Trophy.
