= Kruthik Hanagavadi =

Indian cricketer (born 1996)

Personal information
- Born: 16 January 1996 (age 30)
- Source: ESPNcricinfo, 8 November 2019

Kruthik Hanagavadi (born 16 January 1996) is an Indian cricketer. He made his Twenty20 debut on 8 November 2019, for Mumbai in the 2019–20 Syed Mushtaq Ali Trophy.

Before Hanagavadi's debut for Mumbai, he played in the T20 Mumbai League, where he was named the Best Emerging Player of the tournament.
