= Gujarat State Fertilizer Corporation Ground =

Cricket ground

- Location: Vadodara, India
- Establishment: 29 January 1972 (first recorded match)
- As of 2 February 2017; Source: Ground profile

The Gujarat State Fertilizer Corporation Ground is a cricket ground in Vadodara, India. The first recorded match on the ground was during the 1971/72 cricket season. It held fifteen Ranji Trophy matches between 1972 and 2003, all featuring Baroda. This included the final of the 2000–01 Ranji Trophy tournament. More recently it held three Twenty20 matches in the 2016–17 Inter State Twenty-20 Tournament.

== See also ==
- List of cricket grounds in India
