= Karan Kaila =

Indian cricketer (born 1994)

Personal information
- Born: 8 September 1994 (age 32); Patiala, Punjab, India
- Source: ESPNcricinfo, 22 December 2015

Karan Kaila (born 8 September 1994) is an Indian cricketer who plays as a left-handed batsman for Punjab. He made his List A debut on 10 December 2015 in the 2015–16 Vijay Hazare Trophy. He made his Twenty20 debut for Punjab in the 2018–19 Syed Mushtaq Ali Trophy on 27 February 2019. He made his first-class debut on 17 December 2019, for Punjab in the 2019–20 Ranji Trophy.
