= Amiesh Saheba =

Indian cricket umpire (born 1959)

Personal information
- Full name: Amiesh Maheshbhai Saheba
- Born: November 15, 1959 (age 66); Ahmedabad, Gujarat, India
- Batting: Right-handed
- Relatives: Mahesh Saheba (father); Ashok Saheba (uncle); Samrat Saheba (cousin)

Domestic team information
- Years: Team
- 1983/84–1988/89: Gujarat
- FC debut: 18 December 1983 Gujarat v Saurashtra
- Last FC: 7 January 1989 Gujarat v Saurashtra

Umpiring information
- Tests umpired: 3 (2008–2009)
- ODIs umpired: 51 (2000–2011)
- T20Is umpired: 4 (2007–2009)
- WODIs umpired: 1 (2012)
- WT20Is umpired: 3 (2009)
- FC umpired: 113 (1993–2019)
- LA umpired: 130 (1993–2019)
- T20 umpired: 88 (2007–2019)

Career statistics
Competition	First-class
Matches	15
Runs scored	728
Batting average	26.96
100s/50s	0/5
Top score	86
Catches/stumpings	6/–
- Source: ESPNcricinfo, 22 January 2020

Amiesh Maheshbhai Saheba (born 15 November 1959) is an Indian cricket umpire and former cricketer. He played as a batsman for Gujarat.

Saheba played 15 first-class cricket matches for Gujarat, between 1983 and 1989.

He stood in his first Test match as an umpire on 12 December 2008. He has officiated in 51 One Day Internationals, four Twenty20 Internationals and three Test matches.

Saheba retired as a national-level umpire in 2019, having officiated in 113 matches, a national record at the time.

== See also ==
- List of Test cricket umpires
- List of One Day International cricket umpires
- List of Twenty20 International cricket umpires
