= Gaurav Yadav (cricketer) =

Indian cricketer (born 1991)

Personal information
- Full name: Gaurav Narendra Yadav
- Born: 31 October 1991 (age 35); Narmadapuram, Madhya Pradesh, India
- Batting: Right-handed
- Bowling: Right arm medium
- Source: ESPNcricinfo, 8 October 2016

Gaurav Yadav (born 31 October 1991) is an Indian cricketer. He played as right arm medium pace bowler for Madhya Pradesh in domestic cricket.

He made his first-class debut for Madhya Pradesh in the 2012–13 Ranji Trophy on 2 November 2012. He was the joint-leading wicket-taker in the 2019–20 Vijay Hazare Trophy tournament, with twenty-three dismissals in nine matches. He made his Twenty20 debut on 9 November 2019, for Madhya Pradesh in the 2019–20 Syed Mushtaq Ali Trophy.
