= Samrat Saheba =

Indian cricketer (born 1981)

Samrat Saheba (born 27 March 1981) is an Indian former cricketer. He played as a right-handed batsman and a right-arm medium-pace bowler who for Gujarat. He was born in Ahmedabad.

Saheba, who had previously played for the Gujarat team at Under-16, Under-19, and Under-22 level, made a single List A appearance for the side, during the 2002–03 season, against Mumbai. He did not bat in the match, but bowled three overs, conceding 27 runs.
