= Jayadevan's system =

Mathematical cricket match scoring formulation

The V Jayadevan system, also known as the VJD method, is a proposed method for calculating target scores in interrupted one-day and Twenty20 cricket matches. The method was devised by V. Jayadevan, an Indian engineer. It can be used instead of the DLS method.

== VJD method ==
VJD System Graphs with Normal and Target Curve

The VJD method is essentially built around two curves. The first curve depicts the "normal" run getting pattern; i.e., when there is no interruption and the side is expecting to bat its full quota of overs. The second curve ("target curve") indicates how the batting side should "speed up" after an interruption. The "normal" curve takes into account both the percentage of overs played and the percentage of wickets lost. The "target" curve, which is used to set revised targets, only considers the percentage of overs played.

=== Obtaining the curves ===
To obtain the normal score curve VJD System considers the percentage of runs scored in seven phases: settling down (first 10% of the overs, i.e. the five overs), exploiting field restrictions (next 20% of the overs, i.e. overs 6–15), stabilising the innings-I (next 20%; overs 16–25), stabilising the innings-II (next 10%; overs 26–30), beginning the acceleration (next 20%; overs 31–40), secondary stage of acceleration (next 10%; overs 41–45) and final slog (last 10%; overs 46–50). The normal score curve is then obtained by fitting a suitable regression equation for the cumulative overs % and the corresponding cumulative runs scored %.

VJD System obtains the target score by looking at the percentage of runs scored in each of the seven scoring phases, arranges them in descending order of run productivity, and again obtains a regression fit for cumulative overs % versus the juxtaposed cumulative runs scored %.

The table has twelve columns: overs percentage, "target runs" Gokul percentage and "normal runs" percentage, corresponding to 0–9 wickets fallen. For overs played before an interruption, values are read from the normal runs columns. After an interruption, the "target runs" column is used.

Overs %	Target run %	Normal runs % for wicket fall									
Overs %	Target run %	0	1	2	3	4	5	6	7	8	9
20	29.8	16.9	20.6	22.6	35.0	50.0	60.0	70.0	79.0	87.0	95.0
40	53.5	32.4	34.5	36.5	39.7	50.0	60.0	70.0	79.0	87.0	95.0
50	63.4	40.4	41.7	43.0	44.3	51.9	60.0	70.0	79.0	87.0	95.0
60	72.3	49.2	50.1	51.1	51.4	57.9	64.6	70.0	79.0	87.0	95.0
80	87.6	70.7	70.8	70.9	71.0	71.2	77.1	82.4	84.3	87.0	95.0

For example. If Team 1 score 280 runs in 50 overs. During the break, there is a shower and Team 2 can only bat for 40 overs. Following the interruption, Team 2 must bat for 40 overs out of 50, i.e. 80% of the overs. Using the VJD table, the "target run" % corresponding to 80% overs is 87.6%. So Team 2 must score 246 (280 x 87.6%) runs to win.

== Use in national and international cricket ==
On 13 December 2010, it was reported that the BCCI had decided that Jayadevan's system will be formally used in the fourth edition of Indian Premier League but it was not. The Duckworth-Lewis system was used in the third season and the fourth season of the league.

The ICC still uses the Duckworth Lewis method in all international matches. The Jayadevan system has been put before the ICC in the past, but the decision was made to retain the Duckworth-Lewis method.

Generally speaking, nobody has been able to successfully argue that either the Duckworth-Lewis Method or the Jayadevan System is significantly superior to the other, with most assessments concluding that their performance is reasonably similar.

== Comparison with the Duckworth-Lewis method ==
Both the Duckworth-Lewis method and the Jayadevan System use a statistical method to determine what proportion of a team's runs it is expected to have scored, based upon the number of overs faced and the number of wickets lost (traditionally referred to as the resources available to a team). However, there are two primary differences between the two methods:

- The mathematical relationship used in the Duckworth Lewis system assumes that a team's scoring rate accelerates throughout the team's innings – slowly at first, but more rapidly during the final ten to fifteen overs (the "slog overs"). Jayadevan's relationship is more empirical than Duckworth-Lewis', and assumes that the scoring rate is faster during the first fifteen to twenty overs during fielding restrictions, decelerates during the middle overs when most teams try to consolidate their innings, and then accelerates again for the slog overs. In this way, Jayadevan tries to improve upon Duckworth-Lewis' notion of the "typical innings".
- Secondly, Duckworth-Lewis is based upon a single set of curves which is used to make all adjustments to the scores. The Jayadevan method has two different curves: the "normal curves", which are used to adjust runs already scored by the batting team; and the "target curve", which is used to adjust the runs that the batting team is yet to score. Jayadevan's justification for this is that prior to a rain interruption, a team will base its batting tactics on the assumption that it has its full quota of overs available; but, following an interruption, a team can change its batting tactics to suit the new number of overs – so, if the tactics are inherently different, the curves used to calculate the run targets should also be different.

Under Jayadevan's method, the "normal" curve takes into account both the percentage of overs played and the percentage of wickets lost. The "target" curve considers only the percentage of overs played; i.e. no adjustment is made according to the number of wickets lost.
