= 2019–20 Vijay Hazare Trophy =

Indian cricket tournament

- Dates: 24 September – 25 October 2019
- Administrator: BCCI
- Cricket format: List A cricket
- Tournament format(s): Round-robin and Playoff format
- Host: Various
- Champions: Karnataka (4th title)
- Runners-up: Tamil Nadu
- Participants: 38
- Matches: 169
- Most runs: Devdutt Padikkal (609) (Karnataka)
- Most wickets: Pritam Das (23) (Assam); Gaurav Yadav (23) (Madhya Pradesh)

The 2019–20 Vijay Hazare Trophy was the 27th edition of the Vijay Hazare Trophy, an annual List A cricket tournament in India. It took place in September and October 2019, after the Duleep Trophy and before the Ranji Trophy. Chandigarh competed in the Vijay Hazare Trophy for the first time. Mumbai were the defending champions.

Seventeen out of the first thirty matches that were scheduled to be played across all four groups were abandoned or finished in a no result. Therefore, the Board of Control for Cricket in India (BCCI) issued a revised schedule for the rain-affected matches. The statistics for cancelled matches were revoked leading to Rongsen Jonathan missing out on his maiden hundred in List A cricket. On 12 October 2019, in the Group A match between Kerala and Goa, Kerala's Sanju Samson scored the fastest double century in List A cricket. It was the highest individual total in the Vijay Hazare Trophy, with an unbeaten 212 runs from 129 balls. It was also the highest total made by a wicket-keeper in a List A cricket match.

Following the conclusion of matches played on 10 October 2019, Gujarat and Tamil Nadu, both from Group C, were the first two teams to qualify for the knockout stage of the tournament. After the final group matches, Chhattisgarh, Delhi, Karnataka, Mumbai and Punjab finished in the top five places across groups A and B. They were joined by Pondicherry in the knockout stage, who finished top of the Plate Group.

In the first quarter-final match, Group A winners Karnataka beat Pondicherry, who won the Plate Group, by eight wickets. The second quarter-final saw Gujarat beat Delhi by six wickets by the VJD method, after a brief rain delay. The remaining two quarter-final matches both finished in a no result due to rain. As a result, Chhattisgarh advanced over Mumbai and Tamil Nadu advanced over Punjab, after Chhattisgarh and Tamil Nadu had won more matches in the group stage of the competition.

The first semi-final saw Karnataka beat Chhattisgarh by nine wickets, with ten overs to spare, after Devdutt Padikkal scored 92 runs. In the second semi-final, the match was delayed due to a wet outfield, and eventually shortened to 40 overs per side. Tamil Nadu went on to beat Gujarat by five wickets, with Shahrukh Khan making an unbeaten fifty, to advance to the final. Karnataka won a rain-affected final, beating Tamil Nadu by 60 runs, with Abhimanyu Mithun taking a hat-trick.

== Teams and format ==
The teams were placed in the following groups. Chandigarh competed in the tournament for the first time. The tournament retained the same format as the previous edition of the competition. The tournament had four groups, with nine teams each in Groups A, B and ten teams in Group C and the Plate Group. The top two teams from Group C and the top team in the Plate Group progressed to the quarter-finals of the tournament, along with the top five teams across Groups A and B.

Group A

- Andhra
- Chhattisgarh
- Goa
- Hyderabad
- Jharkhand
- Karnataka
- Kerala
- Mumbai
- Saurashtra

Group B

- Baroda
- Delhi
- Haryana
- Himachal Pradesh
- Maharashtra
- Odisha
- Punjab
- Uttar Pradesh
- Vidarbha

Group C

- Bengal
- Bihar
- Gujarat
- Jammu & Kashmir
- Madhya Pradesh
- Railways
- Rajasthan
- Services
- Tamil Nadu
- Tripura

Plate Group

- Arunachal Pradesh
- Assam
- Chandigarh
- Manipur
- Meghalaya
- Mizoram
- Nagaland
- Pondicherry
- Sikkim
- Uttarakhand

== League stage ==
=== Group A ===
Pos	Team	Pld	W	L	T	NR	Pts	NRR
1	Karnataka	8	7	1	0	0	28	1.170
4	Chhattisgarh	8	5	2	0	1	22	0.066
5	Mumbai	8	4	2	0	2	20	0.832
7	Hyderabad	8	4	3	0	1	18	0.734
8	Jharkhand	8	4	4	0	0	16	−0.231
9	Kerala	8	4	4	0	0	16	0.435
15	Saurashtra	8	3	5	0	0	12	−0.648
17	Andhra	8	1	6	0	1	6	−1.122
18	Goa	8	1	6	0	1	6	−1.616

- Top five teams across Groups A and B advanced to the knockout stage.
- Bottom two teams across Groups A and B relegated to the Elite Group C for the next season.

=== Group B ===
Pos	Team	Pld	W	L	T	NR	Pts	NRR
2	Delhi	8	5	2	0	1	22	0.306
3	Punjab	8	5	2	0	1	22	0.804
6	Uttar Pradesh	8	4	2	0	2	20	0.724
10	Maharashtra	8	3	3	0	2	16	−0.073
11	Himachal Pradesh	8	3	4	0	1	14	0.039
12	Odisha	8	3	4	0	1	14	−1.052
13	Baroda	8	3	5	0	0	12	0.230
14	Vidarbha	8	3	5	0	0	12	−0.061
16	Haryana	8	3	5	0	0	12	−0.978

- Top five teams across Groups A and B advanced to the knockout stage.
- Bottom two teams across Groups A and B relegated to the Elite Group C for the next season.

=== Group C ===
Pos	Team	Pld	W	L	T	NR	Pts	NRR
1	Tamil Nadu	9	9	0	0	0	36	1.869
2	Gujarat	9	8	1	0	0	32	1.246
3	Bengal	9	5	2	1	1	24	0.196
4	Services	9	5	4	0	0	20	−0.339
5	Tripura	9	4	5	0	0	16	−0.279
6	Jammu & Kashmir	9	4	5	0	0	16	−0.427
7	Madhya Pradesh	9	3	5	0	1	14	−0.369
8	Railways	9	2	5	2	0	12	−0.280
9	Rajasthan	9	2	6	1	0	10	−0.099
10	Bihar	9	0	9	0	0	0	−1.706

- Top two teams advances to the knockout stage and are promoted to the Elite Group A and B.
- Bottom ranked team is relegated to the Plate Group for the next season.

=== Plate Group ===
Pos	Team	Pld	W	L	T	NR	Pts	NRR
1	Pondicherry	9	7	0	0	2	32	3.523
2	Chandigarh	9	6	2	0	1	26	0.759
3	Uttarakhand	9	5	1	0	3	26	2.236
4	Assam	9	6	3	0	0	24	1.670
5	Nagaland	9	4	2	0	3	22	−0.140
6	Meghalaya	9	3	4	0	2	16	0.559
7	Arunachal Pradesh	9	2	6	0	1	10	−1.373
8	Manipur	9	1	5	0	3	10	−1.807
9	Mizoram	9	1	6	0	2	8	−2.276
10	Sikkim	9	1	7	0	1	6	−1.847

- Top team advanced to the knockout stage and gets promoted to Elite Group C for the next season.

== Knockout stage ==
Quarterfinals
A1	Karnataka	213/2 (41 overs)
P1	Pondicherry	207/9 (50 overs)
A2	Chhattisgarh	190/6 (45.4 overs)
A3	Mumbai	95/0 (11.3 overs)
B1	Delhi	223 (49 overs)
C2	Gujarat	225/4 (37.5 overs)
B2	Punjab	52/2 (12.2 overs)
C1	Tamil Nadu	174/6 (39 overs)

Semifinals
A1	Karnataka	229/1 (40 overs)
A2	Chhattisgarh	223 (49.4 overs)
C2	Gujarat	177/9 (40 overs)
C1	Tamil Nadu	181/5 (39 overs)

Final
A1	Karnataka	146/1 (23 overs)
C1	Tamil Nadu	252 (49.5 overs)

=== Quarter-finals ===
Qualifier 1
20 October 2019
Scorecard

Pondicherry; 207/9 (50 overs)	v	Karnataka; 213/2 (41 overs)
Vikneshwaran Marimuthu 58 (98); Praveen Dubey 3/44 (10 overs)		KL Rahul 90 (112); Sagar Udeshi 2/47 (10 overs)

Karnataka won by 8 wickets
M. Chinnaswamy Stadium, Bangalore
Umpires: Chettithody Shamshuddin and Anil Chaudhary

- Karnataka won the toss and elected to field.

Qualifier 2
20 October 2019
Scorecard

Delhi; 223 (49 overs)	v	Gujarat; 225/4 (37.5 overs)
Dhruv Shorey 91 (109); Chintan Gaja 3/27 (10 overs)		Priyank Panchal 80 (91); Simarjeet Singh 2/54 (9 overs)

Gujarat won by 6 wickets (VJD method)
Just Cricket Academy Ground, Bangalore
Umpires: Abhijit Deshmukh and C. K. Nandan

- Gujarat won the toss and elected to field.

Qualifier 3
21 October 2019
Scorecard

Tamil Nadu; 174/6 (39 overs)	v	Punjab; 52/2 (12.2 overs)
Baba Aparajith 56 (76); Gurkeerat Singh 2/25 (5 overs)		Sanvir Singh 21* (42); Ravisrinivasan Sai Kishore 1/17 (4.2 overs)

No result
Alur Cricket Ground, Alur
Umpires: K. N. Ananthapadmanabhan and Chettithody Shamshuddin

- Punjab won the toss and elected to field.
- Rain during Punjab's innings prevented any further play.
- Tamil Nadu advanced due to more wins in the group stage of the tournament.

Qualifier 4
21 October 2019
Scorecard

Chhattisgarh; 190/6 (45.4 overs)	v	Mumbai; 95/0 (11.3 overs)
Harpreet Singh 83 (108); Dhawal Kulkarni 2/9 (8 overs)		Yashasvi Jaiswal 60* (38)

No result
Alur Cricket Ground, Alur
Umpires: Anil Chaudhary and C. K. Nandan

- Mumbai won the toss and elected to field.
- Rain during Mumbai's innings prevented any further play.
- Chhattisgarh advanced due to more wins in the group stage of the tournament.

=== Semi-finals ===
Semi-final 1
23 October 2019
Scorecard

Chhattisgarh; 223 (49.4 overs)	v	Karnataka; 229/1 (40 overs)
Amandeep Khare 78 (102); Vasuki Koushik 4/46 (9.4 overs)		Devdutt Padikkal 92 (98); Ajay Mandal 1/55 (9 overs)

Karnataka won by 9 wickets
M. Chinnaswamy Stadium, Bangalore
Umpires: K. N. Ananthapadmanabhan and Chettithody Shamshuddin

- Karnataka won the toss and elected to field.

Semi-final 2
23 October 2019
Scorecard

Gujarat; 177/9 (40 overs)	v	Tamil Nadu; 181/5 (39 overs)
Dhruv Raval 40 (37); M Mohammed 3/23 (6 overs)		Shahrukh Khan 56* (46); Karan Patel 1/18 (6 overs)

Tamil Nadu won by 5 wickets
Just Cricket Academy Ground, Bangalore
Umpires: Abhijit Deshmukh and C. K. Nandan

- Tamil Nadu won the toss and elected to field.
- The match was reduced to 40 overs per side due to a wet outfield.

=== Final ===
Final
25 October 2019
Scorecard

Tamil Nadu; 252 (49.5 overs)	v	Karnataka; 146/1 (23 overs)
Abhinav Mukund 85 (110); Abhimanyu Mithun 5/34 (9.5 overs)		Mayank Agarwal 69* (55); Washington Sundar 1/51 (6 overs)

Karnataka won by 60 runs (VJD method)
M. Chinnaswamy Stadium, Bangalore
Umpires: K. N. Ananthapadmanabhan and Chettithody Shamshuddin

- Karnataka won the toss and elected to field.
- Rain during Karnataka's innings prevented any further play.
- Prateek Jain (Karnataka) made his List A debut.
