= 2016–17 Ranji Trophy Group B =

Cricket tournament

2016-17 Ranji Trophy Group B
- The Ranji Trophy, awarded to the winners
- Dates: 6 October 2016 – 18 December 2016
- Administrator: BCCI
- Cricket format: First-class cricket
- Tournament format: Round-robin
- Host: India
- Participants: 9

The 2016–17 Ranji Trophy is the 83rd season of the Ranji Trophy, the first-class cricket tournament in India. It is being contested by 28 teams divided into three groups. Groups A and B comprise nine teams and Group C comprises ten teams. The round 1 fixture between Rajasthan and Saurashtra was moved from Chennai to Vizianagaram because of the senior women's one-day league. The round 2 fixture between Jharkhand and Karnataka was moved from Tamil Nadu to Greater Noida because of the Kaveri River water dispute.

Karnataka, Jharkhand and Odisha all qualified for the knockout stage of the tournament, with Odisha qualifying for the knockout stage for the first time since the 2000–01 tournament. Jharkhand finished top of the table after winning their final match by an innings and 93 runs.

== Points table ==
Team	Pld	W	L	D	A	Pts	NRR
Jharkhand	8	5	0	3	0	39	+0.399
Karnataka	8	5	1	2	0	37	+0.273
Odisha	8	2	1	5	0	22	+0.054
Delhi	8	2	2	4	0	21	+0.579
Maharashtra	8	2	3	3	0	21	–0.059
Vidarbha	8	2	2	4	0	20	–0.025
Saurashtra	8	2	4	2	0	18	+0.101
Rajasthan	8	1	4	3	0	12	–0.637
Assam	8	1	5	2	0	8	–0.620

- Top three teams advanced to knockout stage.

== Fixtures ==
=== Round 1 ===
6–9 October
Scorecard

Saurashtra	v	Rajasthan
430 (97.3 overs); Jaydev Shah 193 (228); Mahipal Lomror 2/16 (5 overs)		105 (38.4 overs); Manender Singh 44 (59); Shaurya Sanandia 6/14 (9.4 overs)
		30/4 (14 overs) (f/o); Rajat Bhatia 14 (11); Jaydev Unadkat 2/4 (6 overs)

Match drawn
Dr PVG Raju ACA Sports Complex, Vizianagaram
Umpires: Jayaraman Madanagopal and Ravi Subramanian
Player of the match: Jaydev Shah (Saurashtra)

- Rajasthan won the toss and elected to field.
- Mahipal Lomror (Rajasthan) made his first-class debut.

6–9 October
Scorecard

Odisha	v	Vidarbha
150 (78.1 overs); Biplab Samantray 53 (133); Shrikant Wagh 3/13 (13 overs)		272/6d (102 overs); Faiz Fazal 99 (246); Deepak Behera 3/35 (19 overs)
274/9d (102.1 overs); Govinda Poddar 58 (98); Akshay Wakhare 3/61 (20 overs)

Match drawn
Dr. Y.S. Rajasekhara Reddy ACA-VDCA Cricket Stadium, Visakhapatnam
Umpires: S. Shankar and R. Sundar
Player of the match: Faiz Fazal (Vidarbha)

- Odisha won the toss and elected to bat.
- Sandeep Pattnaik, Subhranshu Senapati (Odisha); and Lalit Yadav (Vidarbha) all made their first-class debuts.

6–9 October
Scorecard

Assam	v	Delhi
193 (76.3 overs); Tarjinder Singh 61* (100); Pradeep Sangwan 3/47 (16.3 overs)		589/8d (128.1 overs); Nitish Rana 146 (124); Abu Nechim 5/106 (25 overs)
313 (96.3 overs); Jamaluddin Syed Mohammad 82 (154); Manan Sharma 5/108 (26.3 overs)

Delhi won by an innings and 83 runs
Moti Bagh Stadium, Vadodara
Umpires: Abhijit Deshmukh and Sadashiv Iyer
Player of the match: Pradeep Sangwan (Delhi)

- Delhi won the toss and elected to field.

6–9 October
Scorecard

Maharashtra	v	Jharkhand
210 (71.1 overs); Ankit Bawne 78 (160); Varun Aaron 4/47 (15 overs)		306 (105.2 overs); Kaushal Singh 130 (200); Anupam Sanklecha 5/71 (32.2 overs)
188 (61.4 overs); Kedar Jadhav 56 (77); Shahbaz Nadeem 3/43 (12.4 overs)		93/4 (19.5 overs); Virat Singh 33* (73); Anupam Sanklecha 2/29 (10 overs)

Jharkhand won by 6 wickets
Karnail Singh Stadium, Delhi
Umpires: Balwant Sharma and Chirra Ravikanthreddy
Player of the match: Kaushal Singh (Jharkhand)

- Jharkhand won the toss and elected to field.
- Ruturaj Gaikwad (Maharashtra) made his first-class debut.
- Kaushal Singh (Jharkhand) scored his maiden first-class century.

=== Round 2 ===
13–16 October
Scorecard

Odisha	v	Saurashtra
228 (80.5 overs); Sandeep Pattnaik 123 (213); Dharmendrasinh Jadeja 4/67 (23.5 overs)		186 (67.3 overs); Jaydev Shah 64 (98); Basant Mohanty 4/58 (20 overs)
169 (64.4 overs); Subhranshu Senapati 57 (101); Deepak Punia 5/39 (11.4 overs)		179 (101 overs); Sagar Jogiyani 68 (295); Suryakant Pradhan 5/69 (22 overs)

Odisha won by 32 runs
Rajiv Gandhi International Stadium, Hyderabad
Umpires: S. Shankar and R. Sundar
Player of the match: Suryakant Pradhan (Odisha)

- Saurashtra won the toss and elected to field.
- Saurabh Rawat (Odisha) made his first-class debut.

13–16 October
Scorecard

Maharashtra	v	Delhi
635/2d (173 overs); Swapnil Gugale 351* (521); Navdeep Saini 2/44 (14.1 overs)		590 (155 overs); Rishabh Pant 308 (326); Mohsin Sayyed 3/121 (27)
58/0 (15 overs); Harshad Khadiwale 38* (40)

Match drawn
Wankhede Stadium, Mumbai
Umpires: Krishnaraj Srinath and Shavir Tarapore
Player of the match: Swapnil Gugale (Maharashtra)

- Maharashtra won the toss and elected to bat.
- Mohsin Sayyed and Naushad Shaikh (Maharashtra) both made their first-class debuts.
- Swapnil Gugale and Ankit Bawne (Maharashtra) made the second-highest partnership in first-class cricket with 594 runs.
- Their partnership was also the highest in all matches in the history of the Ranji Trophy.
- Swapnil Gugale became the seventh captain to score a triple century in the Ranji Trophy.
- Rishabh Pant (Delhi) became the fourth-youngest player to score a triple century in first-class cricket.

13–16 October
Scorecard

Karnataka	v	Jharkhand
577/6d (172 overs); Ravikumar Samarth 235 (462); Ashish Kumar 3/78 (33 overs)		374 (115.1 overs); Ishan Kishan 159* (211); Krishnappa Gowtham 3/97 (32.1 overs)
162/3 (53.4 overs); Karun Nair 54* (86); Samar Quadri 3/62 (20 overs)

Match drawn
Greater Noida Sports Complex Ground, Greater Noida
Umpires: Abhijit Deshmukh and Nitin Pandit
Player of the match: Ravikumar Samarth (Karnataka)

- Karnataka won the toss and elected to bat.
- Kaunain Abbas (Karnataka) made his first-class debut.

13–16 October
Scorecard

Assam	v	Rajasthan
195 (84.1 overs); Rishav Das 93 (221); Pankaj Singh 5/39 (21.3 overs)		272 (105.4 overs); Mahipal Lomror 89 (242); Arup Das 4/53 (26 overs)
69 (20.2 overs); Rishav Das 16 (43); Aniket Choudhary 5/35 (10 overs)

Rajasthan won by an innings and 8 runs
Dr. Y.S. Rajasekhara Reddy ACA-VDCA Cricket Stadium, Visakhapatnam
Umpires: K. N. Ananthapadmanabhan and Nand Kishore
Player of the match: Mahipal Lomror (Rajasthan)

- Rajasthan won the toss and elected to field.

=== Round 3 ===
20–23 October
Scorecard

Jharkhand	v	Rajasthan
209 (73.5 overs); Kaushal Singh 56 (114); Pankaj Singh 5/60 (21 overs)		207 (83.2 overs); Manender Singh 50 (103); Shahbaz Nadeem 7/74 (25 overs)
277 (76.5 overs); Ishank Jaggi 100 (141); Mahipal Lomror 5/51 (16.5 overs)		237 (90.5 overs); Chetan Bist 77 (136); Shahbaz Nadeem 5/94 (37 overs)

Jharkhand won by 42 runs
Moti Bagh Stadium, Vadodara
Umpires: Rajesh Deshpande and Virender Sharma
Player of the match: Shahbaz Nadeem (Jharkhand)

- Jharkhand won the toss and elected to bat.
- Pratyush Singh (Jharkhand) made his first-class debut.

20–23 October
Scorecard

Saurashtra	v	Maharashtra
657/8d (170.5 overs); Jaydev Shah 217 (270); Mohsin Sayyed 4/90 (24.5 overs)		182 (56.2 overs); Murtaza Trunkwala 64 (139); Dharmendrasinh Jadeja 5/41 (15.2 overs)
		345/8 (130 overs) (f/o); Murtaza Trunkwala 117 (227); Dharmendrasinh Jadeja 4/64 (48 overs)

Match drawn
Dr PVG Raju ACA Sports Complex, Vizianagaram
Umpires: K. N. Ananthapadmanabhan and Nand Kishore
Player of the match: Jaydev Shah (Saurashtra)

- Maharashtra won the toss and elected to field.
- Murtaza Trunkwala (Maharashtra) made his first-class debut.
- Jaydev Shah became the first captain of Saurashtra to score a double century.

20–23 October
Scorecard

Delhi	v	Karnataka
90 (35.5 overs); Rishabh Pant 24 (20); Sreenath Aravind 4/12 (11 overs)		414 (141.3 overs); C. M. Gautam 63* (143); Varun Sood 4/80 (30.3 overs)
164 (43 overs); Unmukt Chand 38 (72); Krishnappa Gowtham 5/35 (9 overs)

Karnataka won by an innings and 160 runs
Eden Gardens, Kolkata
Umpires: Pashchim Pathak and Nikhil Patwardhan
Player of the match: Krishnappa Gowtham (Karnataka)

- Karnataka won the toss and elected to field.

20–23 October
Scorecard

Vidarbha	v	Assam
416 (142.2 overs); Ganesh Satish 105 (199); Swarupam Purkayastha 5/133 (35.2 overs)		227 (90.1 overs); Swarupam Purkayastha 44* (56); Aditya Sarwate 5/72 (20 overs)
		73/2 (39 overs) (f/o); Rahul Hazarika 33* (121); Aditya Sarwate 1/11 (6 overs)

Match drawn
St Xavier's College Ground, Thumba
Umpires: Navdeep Singh and Krishnaraj Srinath
Player of the match: Aditya Sarwate (Vidarbha)

- Vidarbha won the toss and elected to bat.

=== Round 4 ===
27–30 October
Scorecard

Odisha	v	Delhi
237 (77.4 overs); Subhranshu Senapati 76 (153); Varun Sood 3/23 (12.4 overs)		495/8d (144.5 overs); Gautam Gambhir 147 (232); Dhiraj Singh 4/84 (29.5 overs)
274/8 (133 overs); Biplab Samantray 88 (221); Ishant Sharma 3/51 (27 overs)

Match drawn
Punjab Cricket Association IS Bindra Stadium, Chandigarh
Umpires: Sivasubramaniyan Shankar and Ravi Subramanian
Player of the match: Gautam Gambhir (Delhi)

- Delhi won the toss and elected to field.

27–30 October
Scorecard

Maharashtra	v	Rajasthan
461 (147.4 overs); Naushad Shaikh 143 (305); Pankaj Singh 4/62 (32.4 overs)		330 (123.4 overs); Manender Singh 63 (185); Mohsin Sayyed 3/71 (26 overs)
145 (61 overs); Chirag Khurana 36 (64); Nathu Singh 3/32 (15 overs)		4/0 (6 overs); Vineet Saxena 4* (18)

Match drawn
Rajiv Gandhi International Stadium, Hyderabad
Umpires: Yeshwant Barde and Nand Kishore
Player of the match: Naushad Shaikh (Maharashtra)

- Maharashtra won the toss and elected to bat.

27–30 October
Scorecard

Assam	v	Karnataka
325 (108.5 overs); Amit Verma 166* (316); Sreenath Aravind 5/70 (27 overs)		570/9d (138.4 overs); Stuart Binny 156 (158); Arup Das 4/86 (31.4 overs)
264 (85 overs); Amit Verma 74 (120); Krishnappa Gowtham 7/108 (34 overs)		21/0 (3 overs); Mayank Agarwal 17* (10)

Karnataka won by 10 wickets
Bandra Kurla Complex, Mumbai
Umpires: Navdeep Singh and Pashchim Pathak
Player of the match: Amit Verma (Assam)

- Assam won the toss and elected to bat.

27–30 October
Scorecard

Vidarbha	v	Jharkhand
105 (42 overs); Jitesh Sharma 21 (16); Vikash Singh 4/24 (11 overs)		362/8d (122.5 overs); Ishank Jaggi 112* (213); Akshay Karnewar 2/45 (18 overs)
444 (152.2 overs); Sanjay Raghunath 102 (203); Ashish Kumar 4/89 (33 overs)		75/4 (24.5 overs); Saurabh Tiwary 35* (49); Shrikant Wagh 3/36 (9.5 overs)

Match drawn
Krishnagiri Stadium, Wayanad
Umpires: Puttarangaiah Jayapal and Krishnaraj Srinath
Player of the match: Ishank Jaggi (Jharkhand)

- Jharkhand won the toss and elected to field.
- Vikash Singh (Jharkhand); Rajneesh Gurbani and Akshay Karnewar (Vidarbha) all made their first-class debuts.

=== Round 5 ===
5–8 November
Scorecard

Jharkhand	v	Delhi
493 (119.4 overs); Ishan Kishan 273 (336); Suboth Bhati 3/80 (23.4 overs)		334 (96.2 overs); Rishabh Pant 117 (106); Sunny Gupta 3/62 (20.2 overs)
		480/6 (126 overs) (f/o); Rishabh Pant 135 (67); Shahbaz Nadeem 3/185 (46 overs)

Match drawn
St Xavier's College Ground, Thumba
Umpires: Anil Dandekar and Nitin Pandit
Player of the match: Ishan Kishan (Jharkhand)

- Delhi won the toss and elected to field.
- In the second innings of the match Rishabh Pant scored India's fastest first-class hundred.

5–8 November
Scorecard

Karnataka	v	Vidarbha
267 (77 overs); Krishnappa Gowtham 60* (59); Lalit Yadav 5/46 (20.5 overs)		176 (66.4 overs); Jitesh Sharma 61 (122); Shreyas Gopal 3/22 (8 overs)
209 (58.4 overs); Vinay Kumar 56 (86); Shrikant Wagh 4/59 (20.4 overs)		111 (36.4 overs); Jitesh Sharma 61 (78); Vinay Kumar 5/28 (9.4 overs)

Karnataka won by 189 runs
Moti Bagh Stadium, Vadodara
Umpires: Navdeep Singh and Rohan Pandit
Player of the match: Vinay Kumar (Karnataka)

- Vidarbha won the toss and elected to field.

5–8 November
Scorecard

Saurashtra	v	Assam
153 (52.4 overs); Jaydev Unadkat 46* (68); Arup Das 7/49 (15 overs)		171 (62.4 overs); Arun Karthik 57 (120); Jaydev Unadkat 6/48 (22.4 overs)
81 (39.5 overs); Amitoze Singh 30 (48); Arup Das 5/21 (13.5 overs)		66/1 (15.4 overs); Rishav Das 30* (41); Jaydev Unadkat 1/28 (6 overs)

Assam won by 9 wickets
Eden Gardens, Kolkata
Umpires: Yeshwant Barde and Nitin Menon
Player of the match: Arup Das (Assam)

- Assam won the toss and elected to field.

5–8 November
Scorecard

Rajasthan	v	Odisha
323 (105.4 overs); S. F. Khan 110 (203); Govinda Poddar 3/59 (25.4 overs)		172 (49.1 overs); Deepak Behera 67 (113); Aniket Choudhary 4/42 (12 overs)
		508/6d (156 overs) (f/o); Subhranshu Senapati 137 (254); S. F. Khan 2/42 (16 overs)

Match drawn
Dhruve Pandove Stadium, Patiala
Umpires: Saiyed Khalid and Krishnaraj Srinath
Player of the match: S. F. Khan (Rajasthan)

- Odisha won the toss and elected to field.
- Abhishek Yadav (Odisha); Rahul Chahar, Amitkumar Gautam and Salman Khan (Rajasthan) all made their first-class debuts.

=== Round 6 ===
13–16 November
Scorecard

Saurashtra	v	Jharkhand
277 (78.3 overs); Prerak Mankad 96 (137); Ashish Kumar 4/52 (19 overs)		467 (101.5 overs); Ishank Jaggi 173 (209); Kushang Patel 5/95 (25 overs)
144 (48.3 overs); Prerak Mankad 40* (63); Samar Quadri 4/46 (13.3 overs)

Jharkhand won by an innings and 46 runs
Maharaja Bir Bikram College Stadium, Agartala
Umpires: Saiyed Khalid and Sadashiv Iyer
Player of the match: Ishank Jaggi (Jharkhand)

- Jharkhand won the toss and elected to field.

13–16 November
Scorecard

Assam	v	Odisha
301 (121.5 overs); Kunal Saikia 135 (309); Basant Mohanty 3/18 (24 overs)		459/7d (148 overs); Govinda Poddar 225 (364); Arup Das 3/60 (21 overs)
164/4 (75.0 overs); Rishav Das 68 (222); Dhiraj Singh 2/27 (20 overs)

Match drawn
Rajiv Gandhi International Stadium, Hyderabad
Umpires: Umesh Dubey and Belur Ravi
Player of the match: Govinda Poddar (Odisha)

- Assam won the toss and elected to bat.
- This fixture was originally scheduled to be held in Delhi, but was moved due to concerns about smog pollution.
- Abinash Saha (Odisha) made his first-class debut.

13–16 November
Scorecard

Vidarbha	v	Maharashtra
59 (28 overs); Shalabh Shrivastava 19 (24); Anupam Sanklecha 7/25 (11 overs)		332 (86.1 overs); Naushad Shaikh 127 (172); Lalit Yadav 5/81 (23 overs)
270 (76.1 overs); Shrikant Wagh 69* (73); Anupam Sanklecha 7/69 (25.1 overs)

Maharashtra won by an innings and 3 runs
Eden Gardens, Kolkata
Umpires: Yeshwant Barde and David Millns
Player of the match: Anupam Sanklecha (Maharashtra)

- Maharashtra won the toss and elected to field.
- Pradeep Dadhe (Maharashtra) made his first-class debut.

13–16 November
Scorecard

Karnataka	v	Rajasthan
374 (99.1 overs); Mayank Agarwal 81 (127); Tanveer Ul-Haq 5/82 (24 overs)		148 (54 overs); Sidhant Dobal 47 (61); Vinay Kumar 4/28 (15 overs)
298/6d (62.1 overs); Lokesh Rahul 106 (131); Rajesh Bishnoi 4/87 (19.1 overs)		131 (37 overs); S. F. Khan 39 (41); Vinay Kumar 5/54 (11 overs)

Karnataka won by 393 runs
Dr PVG Raju ACA Sports Complex, Vizianagaram
Umpires: Anil Dandekar and Vineet Kulkarni
Player of the match: Vinay Kumar (Karnataka)

- Karnataka won the toss and elected to bat.
- Rajesh Bishnoi (Rajasthan) made his first-class debut.

=== Round 7 ===
21–24 November
Scorecard

Karnataka	v	Odisha
179 (66.2 overs); Chidhambaram Gautam 54 (84); Basant Mohanty 3/46 (19 overs)		342 (117.1 overs); Saurabh Rawat 85 (124); Shreyas Gopal 5/75 (27 overs)
393 (121.2 overs); Chidhambaram Gautam 95 (240); Dhiraj Singh 5/98 (29.2 overs)		63/0 (32 overs); Ranjit Singh 35* (96)

Match drawn
Palam A Ground, Model Sports Complex, Delhi
Umpires: David Millns and Tapan Sharma
Player of the match: Saurabh Rawat (Odisha)

- Odisha won the toss and elected to field.

21–24 November
Scorecard

Rajasthan	v	Delhi
238 (71.3 overs); Amitkumar Gautam 106 (182); Navdeep Saini 3/28 (15 overs)		307 (91.4 overs); Rishabh Pant 75 (59); Tanveer Ul-Haq 3/55 (16 overs)
221 (85.4 overs); Rajesh Bishnoi 89 (162); Pradeep Sangwan 3/31 (16 overs)		156/8 (41.4 overs); Shikhar Dhawan 49 (70); Tanveer Ul-Haq 2/28 (8 overs)

Delhi won by 2 wickets
Krishnagiri Stadium, Wayanad
Umpires: Yeshwant Barde and Sadashiv Iyer
Player of the match: Amitkumar Gautam (Rajasthan)

- Delhi won the toss and elected to field.

21–24 November
Scorecard

Maharashtra	v	Assam
542 (144 overs); Kedar Jadhav 115 (106); Abu Nechim 3/83 (22 overs)		256 (77 overs); Rishav Das 86 (201); Anupam Sanklecha 8/73 (22 overs)
		234 (73.0 overs) (f/o); Arun Karthik 87 (177); Mohsin Sayyed 4/47 (18 overs)

Maharashtra won by an innings and 52 runs
MA Chidambaram Stadium, Chennai
Umpires: Lubabalo Gcuma and Nand Kishore
Player of the match: Anupam Sanklecha (Maharashtra)

- Maharashtra won the toss and elected to bat.
- Mrinmoy Dutta (Assam) made his first-class debut.

21–24 November
Scorecard

Saurashtra	v	Vidarbha
301 (86.1 overs); Sheldon Jackson 116 (149); Rajneesh Gurbani 4/85 (21 overs)		347 (147.5 overs); Faiz Fazal 94 (204); Vandit Jivrajani 4/93 (42 overs)
189 (80 overs); Snell Patel 62 (104); Azhar Sheikh 4/31 (16 overs)		146/2 (35 overs); Ganesh Satish 56* (70); Deepak Punia 1/13 (4 overs)

Vidarbha won by 8 wickets
Karnail Singh Stadium, Delhi
Umpires: Belur Ravi and Chirra Ravikanthreddy
Player of the match: Sanjay Raghunath (Vidarbha)

- Vidarbha won the toss and elected to field.

=== Round 8 ===
29 November–2 December
Scorecard

Karnataka	v	Saurashtra
200 (64.1 overs); Manish Pandey 75 (122); Jay Chauhan 3/52 (18.1 overs)		359 (115 overs); Prerak Mankad 126 (165); Vinay Kumar 4/54 (24 overs)
216 (92.4 overs); Kaunain Abbas 74 (200); Jay Chauhan 4/71 (36.4 overs)		58/6 (18.4 overs); Prerak Mankad 14* (22); Krishnappa Gowtham 4/14 (7.4 overs)

Saurashtra won by 4 wickets
Dhruve Pandove Stadium, Patiala
Umpires: Ulhas Gandhe and Nikhil Patwardhan
Player of the match: Prerak Mankad (Saurashtra)

- Karnataka won the toss and elected to bat.
- Jay Chauhan and Kishan Parmar (Saurashtra) both made their first-class debuts.

29 November–2 December
Scorecard

Odisha	v	Maharashtra
319 (84.5 overs); Biplab Samantray 89 (192); Anupam Sanklecha 5/75 (23.5 overs)		94 (26 overs); Anupam Sanklecha 18 (33); Suryakant Pradhan 4/34 (10 overs)
		107 (36.4 overs) (f/o); Anupam Sanklecha 22 (23); Biplab Samantray 4/34 (7.4 overs)

Odisha won by an innings and 118 runs
Krishnagiri Stadium, Wayanad
Umpires: Chirra Ravikanthreddy and Ravi Subramanian
Player of the match: Biplab Samantray (Odisha)

- Maharashtra won the toss and elected to field.

29 November–2 December
Scorecard

Vidarbha	v	Delhi
183 (62.3 overs); Shalabh Srivastava 62 (93); Sumit Narwal 4/38 (18 overs)		250/8d (81 overs); Manan Sharma 82* (119); Rajneesh Gurbani 4/76 (26 overs)
37/3 (19.0 overs); Faiz Fazal 14 (37); Vikas Tokas 1/7 (3 overs)

Match drawn
MA Chidambaram Stadium, Chennai
Umpires: Chirra Ravikanthreddy and Ravi Subramanian
Player of the match: Manan Sharma (Delhi)

- Delhi won the toss and elected to field.
- No play was possible on day 3 due to rain.
- Siddhesh Wath (Vidarbha) made his first-class debut.

29 November–2 December
Scorecard

Jharkhand	v	Assam
316 (118 overs); Ishank Jaggi 93 (179); Krishna Das 4/65 (36 overs)		126 (52.2 overs); Pallavkumar Das 30 (68); Rahul Shukla 4/48 (12.2 overs)
111/5 (20.2 overs); Ishank Jaggi 34* (15); Arup Das 3/49 (10.2 overs)		299 (104.4 overs) (f/o); Rishav Das 113 (256); Rahul Shukla 3/74 (22 overs)

Jharkhand won by 5 wickets
Dr PVG Raju ACA Sports Complex, Vizianagaram
Umpires: P. Jayapal and R. Sundar
Player of the match: Rahul Shukla (Jharkhand)

- Assam won the toss and elected to field.

=== Round 9 ===
7–10 December
Scorecard

Saurashtra	v	Delhi
92 (33.2 overs); Prerak Mankad 33 (35); Pradeep Sangwan 4/25 (10.2 overs)		237 (58.3 overs); Pradeep Sangwan 75 (100); Kushang Patel 5/72 (17.3 overs)
420 (127.4 overs); Kishan Parmar 149 (250); Navdeep Saini 3/122 (29 overs)		271 (78.1 overs); Milind Kumar 55 (165); Saurya Sanandiya 5/93 (25 overs)

Saurashtra won by 4 runs
IPCL Sports Complex Ground, Vadodara
Umpires: K. N. Ananthapadmanabhan and Krishnaraj Srinath
Player of the match: Kishan Parmar (Saurashtra)

- Delhi won the toss and elected to field.

7–10 December
Scorecard

Maharashtra	v	Karnataka
163 (56 overs); Rohit Motwani 32 (120); Vinay Kumar 5/46 (17 overs)		327 (110 overs); Pavan Deshpande 70 (139); Anupam Sanklecha 3/78 (32 overs)
218 (47.3 overs); Kedar Jadhav 86 (59); David Mathias 3/37 (10 overs)		39/0 (10 overs); Ravikumar Samarth 25* (34)

Karnataka won by 10 wickets
Punjab Cricket Association IS Bindra Stadium, Chandigarh
Umpires: Nitin Pandit and Anil Chaudhary
Player of the match: Vinay Kumar (Karnataka)

- Karnataka won the toss and elected to field.
- Arjun Hoysala and Pavan Deshpande (Karnataka) both made their first-class debuts.

7–10 December
Scorecard

Rajasthan	v	Vidarbha
140 (41.1 overs); Manender Singh 27 (49); Aditya Sarwate 3/22 (9 overs)		116 (41.3 overs); Siddhesh Wath 50 (80); Tanveer Ul-Haq 6/21 (10.3 overs)
163 (54.5 overs); Amitkumar Gautam 51 (138); Lalit Yadav 6/60 (15.5 overs)		191/4 (31.2 overs); Siddhesh Wath 64 (65); Pankaj Singh 2/96 (12 overs)

Vidarbha won by 6 wickets
Greater Noida Sports Complex Ground, Greater Noida
Umpires: Jayaraman Madanagopal and C. K. Nandan
Player of the match: Siddhesh Wath (Vidarbha)

- Vidarbha won the toss and elected to field.

15–18 December
Scorecard

Odisha	v	Jharkhand
152 (84 overs); Sandeep Pattnaik 43 (174); Shahbaz Nadeem 4/31 (26 overs)		348 (121 overs); Kaushal Singh 86* (125); Basant Mohanty 3/56 (24 overs)
103 (46.3 overs); Sandeep Pattnaik 16 (69); Kaushal Singh 3/17 (10 overs)

Jharkhand won by an innings and 93 runs
St Xavier's College Ground, Thumba
Umpires: Shavir Tarapore and Sadashiv Iyer
Player of the match: Kaushal Singh (Jharkhand)

- Jharkhand won the toss and elected to field.
- The date of this fixture was scheduled to take place a few days later than originally planned following the death of J Jayalalithaa.

== See also ==
- 2016–17 Ranji Trophy
- 2016–17 Ranji Trophy Group A
- 2016–17 Ranji Trophy Group C
