= 2021–22 Syed Mushtaq Ali Trophy Group A =

Cricket tournament

- Dates: 4 – 22 November 2021
- Administrator(s): BCCI
- Cricket format: Twenty20 cricket
- Tournament format(s): Round-robin
- Participants: 6

The 2021–22 Syed Mushtaq Ali Trophy was the fourteenth season of the Syed Mushtaq Ali Trophy, a Twenty20 cricket tournament played in India. It was contested by 38 teams, divided into six groups, with six teams in Group A. The tournament was announced by BCCI on 3 July 2021.

Maharashtra and Tamil Nadu both won four matches, with Maharashtra topping the group on net run rate. Therefore, Tamil Nadu advanced to the quarter-finals by winning their last league match against Maharashtra and the latter progressed to the preliminary quarter-finals.

== Points table ==
| Pos | Team | Pld | W | L | NR | Pts | NRR |
|---|---|---|---|---|---|---|---|
| 1 | Tamil Nadu (Note: Tamil Nadu finishing first and qualified for the quarter finals by winning their last league match against Maharashtra, despite having lesser net run rate than the latter team.) | 5 | 4 | 1 | 0 | 16 | 0.564 |
| 2 | Maharashtra | 5 | 4 | 1 | 0 | 16 | 2.277 |
| 3 | Punjab | 5 | 3 | 2 | 0 | 12 | 1.619 |
| 4 | Goa | 5 | 2 | 3 | 0 | 8 | −1.368 |
| 5 | Odisha | 5 | 1 | 4 | 0 | 4 | −0.957 |
| 6 | Pondicherry | 5 | 1 | 4 | 0 | 4 | −2.073 |

Source: ESPN Cricinfo
Notes:

Advanced to Quarter-final
Advanced to Preliminary quarter-final

== Fixtures ==
=== Round 1 ===
4 November 2021
Scorecard

| Tamil Nadu; 167/4 (20 overs) | v | Maharashtra; 155/6 (20 overs) |
| Vijay Shankar 42* (21); Satyajeet Bachhav 2/35 (4 overs) | | Ruturaj Gaikwad 51 (30); Murugan Ashwin 2/18 (4 overs) |

Tamil Nadu won by 12 runs
BRSABV Ekana Cricket Stadium, Lucknow
Umpires: Nand Kishore and Chettithody Shamshuddin

- Maharashtra won the toss and elected to field.
- Ashay Palkar (Maharashtra) and Sai Sudharsan (Tamil Nadu) both made their T20 debuts.

4 November 2021
Scorecard

| Pondicherry; 106 (19.5 overs) | v | Punjab; 107/2 (12.5 overs) |
| Sagar Trivedi 44 (33); Siddarth Kaul 3/6 (2.5 overs) | | Abhishek Sharma 54* (33); Sagar Trivedi 1/14 (2 overs) |

Punjab won by 8 wickets
BRSABV Ekana Cricket Stadium, Lucknow
Umpires: Nand Kishore and Chettithody Shamshuddin

- Pondicherry won the toss and elected to bat.
- Bharat Sharma, Iqlas Naha (Pondicherry) and Sanvir Singh (Punjab) all made their T20 debuts.

4 November 2021
Scorecard

| Goa; 101/8 (20 overs) | v | Odisha; 107/6 (19.5 overs) |
| Shubham Ranjane 32 (32); Jayanta Behera 3/14 (4 overs) | | Anshuman Rath 29 (37); Lakshay Garg 2/11 (3 overs) |

Odisha won by 4 wickets
Ekana Cricket Stadium B Ground, Lucknow
Umpires: Chirra Ravikanthreddy and Sanjay Kumar Singh

- Odisha won the toss and elected to field.
- Ishaan Gadekar (Goa) and Bikash Rout (Odisha) both made their T20 debuts.

=== Round 2 ===
5 November 2021
Scorecard

| Punjab; 137/6 (20 overs) | v | Maharashtra; 138/3 (17.3 overs) |
| Shubman Gill 44 (39); Divyang Hinganekar 2/17 (4 overs) | | Ruturaj Gaikwad 80 (54); Abhishek Sharma 1/13 (4 overs) |

Maharashtra won by 7 wickets
BRSABV Ekana Cricket Stadium, Lucknow
Umpires: Chirra Ravikanthreddy and Sanjay Kumar Singh

- Maharashtra won the toss and elected to field.

5 November 2021
Scorecard

| Tamil Nadu; 165/5 (20 overs) | v | Odisha; 164/6 (20 overs) |
| Baba Aparajith 44* (28); Abhishek Raut 2/25 (3 overs) | | Subhranshu Senapati 67 (47); T. Natarajan 2/38 (4 overs) |

Tamil Nadu won by 1 run
BRSABV Ekana Cricket Stadium, Lucknow
Umpires: Chirra Ravikanthreddy and Sanjay Kumar Singh

- Odisha won the toss and elected to field.

5 November 2021
Scorecard

| Goa; 161/3 (20 overs) | v | Pondicherry; 152/7 (20 overs) |
| Aditya Kaushik 69* (58); Raghu Sharma 1/25 (4 overs) | | Paras Dogra 84* (57); Amit Yadav 3/16 (4 overs) |

Goa won by 9 runs
Ekana Cricket Stadium B Ground, Lucknow
Umpires: C. K. Nandan and Vinod Seshan

- Goa won the toss and elected to bat.

=== Round 3 ===
6 November 2021
Scorecard

| Punjab; 197/4 (20 overs) | v | Goa; 116/8 (20 overs) |
| Prabhsimran Singh 119* (61); Shubham Ranjane 2/27 (4 overs) | | Suyash Prabhudessai 30 (23); Siddarth Kaul 3/21 (4 overs) |

Punjab won by 81 runs
BRSABV Ekana Cricket Stadium, Lucknow
Umpires: C. K. Nandan and Vinod Seshan

- Goa won the toss and elected to field.
- Nihal Surlaker (Goa) made his T20 debut.

6 November 2021
Scorecard

| Pondicherry; 129/8 (20 overs) | v | Tamil Nadu; 130/2 (16.1 overs) |
| Ramachandran Ragupathy 32 (35); Ravisrinivasan Sai Kishore 4/28 (4 overs) | | Chezhian Harinishanth 75* (49); Sagar Udeshi 2/22 (4 overs) |

Tamil Nadu won by 8 wickets
BRSABV Ekana Cricket Stadium, Lucknow
Umpires: C. K. Nandan and Vinod Seshan

- Tamil Nadu won the toss and elected to field.
- Ramachandran Ragupathy (Pondicherry) made his T20 debut.

6 November 2021
Scorecard

| Maharashtra; 183/8 (20 overs) | v | Odisha; 156 (18.5 overs) |
| Ruturaj Gaikwad 81 (47); Debabrata Pradhan 3/37 (4 overs) | | Anshuman Rath 34 (26); Divyang Hinganekar 4/35 (4 overs) |

Maharashtra won by 27 runs
Ekana Cricket Stadium B Ground, Lucknow
Umpires: Nand Kishore and Chettithody Shamshuddin

- Maharashtra won the toss and elected to bat.

=== Round 4 ===
8 November 2021
Scorecard

| Tamil Nadu; 136/9 (20 overs) | v | Goa; 140/3 (18.4 overs) |
| Sanjay Yadav 38 (29); Shrikant Wagh 4/36 (4 overs) | | Shubham Ranjane 52* (42); P Saravana Kumar 2/17 (2 overs) |

Goa won by 7 wickets
BRSABV Ekana Cricket Stadium, Lucknow
Umpires: Nand Kishore and Chettithody Shamshuddin

- Goa won the toss and elected to field.
- P Saravana Kumar and Ragupathy Silambarasan (Tamil Nadu) both made their T20 debuts.

8 November 2021
Scorecard

| Punjab; 189/4 (20 overs) | v | Odisha; 129/7 (20 overs) |
| Ramandeep Singh 54 (23); Bikash Rout 2/34 (4 overs) | | Abhishek Raut 74* (56); Mayank Markande 2/25 (4 overs) |

Punjab won by 60 runs
BRSABV Ekana Cricket Stadium, Lucknow
Umpires: Nand Kishore and Chettithody Shamshuddin

- Punjab won the toss and elected to bat.

8 November 2021
Scorecard

| Maharashtra; 193/3 (20 overs) | v | Pondicherry; 76 (13.5 overs) |
| Naushad Shaikh 55 (36); Raghu Sharma 2/34 (4 overs) | | Damodaran Rohit 16 (12); Naushad Shaikh 3/9 (2.5 overs) |

Maharashtra won by 117 runs
Ekana Cricket Stadium B Ground, Lucknow
Umpires: Chirra Ravikanthreddy and Sanjay Kumar Singh

- Maharashtra won the toss and elected to bat.
- Manogaran Pooviarasan and Logesh Prabagaran (Pondicherry) both made their T20 debuts.

=== Round 5 ===
9 November 2021
Scorecard

| Odisha; 132/7 (20 overs) | v | Pondicherry; 136/4 (19 overs) |
| Subhranshu Senapati 39 (30); Suboth Bhati 4/27 (4 overs) | | Paras Dogra 54* (44); Abhishek Raut 1/17 (4 overs) |

Pondicherry won by 6 wickets
BRSABV Ekana Cricket Stadium, Lucknow
Umpires: C. K. Nandan and Vinod Seshan

- Pondicherry won the toss and elected to field.
- B Shiva and Harshit Rathod (Odisha) both made their T20 debuts.

9 November 2021
Scorecard

| Maharashtra; 177/3 (20 overs) | v | Goa; 104 (18.1 overs) |
| Yash Nahar 103* (68); Shrikant Wagh 1/25 (4 overs) | | Shubham Ranjane 35 (30); Satyajeet Bachhav 3/27 (4 overs) |

Maharashtra won by 73 runs
BRSABV Ekana Cricket Stadium, Lucknow
Umpires: C. K. Nandan and Vinod Seshan

- Maharashtra won the toss and elected to bat.

9 November 2021
Scorecard

| Punjab; 145/6 (20 overs) | v | Tamil Nadu; 148/3 (17.1 overs) |
| Gurkeerat Singh 43* (20); Sandeep Warrier 2/20 (4 overs) | | Narayan Jagadeesan 67 (47); Siddarth Kaul 1/28 (3.1 overs) |

Tamil Nadu won by 7 wickets
Ekana Cricket Stadium B Ground, Lucknow
Umpires: Chirra Ravikanthreddy and Sanjay Kumar Singh

- Punjab won the toss and elected to bat.
