= Madhavrao Scindia Cricket Ground =

Cricket ground in Rajkot, Gujarat, India

Coordinates: 22°18′07.24″N 70°47′20.53″E

Ground information
- Location: Rajkot, Saurashtra, Gujarat India
- Establishment: 1935
- Capacity: 15,000
- Owner: Rajkot Municipal Corporation
- Operator: Saurashtra Cricket Association
- Tenants: India cricket team (1989- 2009); Saurashtra women's cricket team Saurashtra cricket team
- End names
- Pavilion End; Airport End

International information
- First ODI: 7 October 1989: India v Australia
- Last ODI: 15 December 2009: India v Sri Lanka
- First WODI: 18 January 2011: India v West Indies
- Last WODI: 19 January 2011: India v West Indies
- As of 8 December 2019; Source: ESPNcricinfo

Madhavrao Shindhia Cricket Ground also known as Municipal Corporation Ground or Racecourse Ground is a stadium located in Rajkot, Gujarat, India.

The venue hosted bilateral ODIs between 1980s-2000s, however since the venue's main tenent Saurashtra Cricket Association (SCA) built its own stadium in other part of the Rajkot city, they organise all international cricket allocated them at there.

== History ==
Madhavrao Scindia Cricket Ground is also used for staging first class cricket. It has hosted 86 first class cricket match.

The ground dimensions being comparatively small and the pitch usually is batsman-friendly contributed to some enormous scores in the past. New Zealand scored 349/5 in 2001, India scored 387/5 in 2008 but the best ever was in the Game between India and Sri Lanka on 15 December 2009 when India scored 414 runs (then highest ever in Indian history) but Sri Lanka almost won the contest and ended up with 411/8, just 3 runs short making it only second ODI match in which both team scored more than 400.

Madhavrao Scindia Cricket Ground was abandoned as an international venue when the Saurashtra Cricket Association built the Saurashtra Cricket Association Stadium in 2008 on the outskirts of the city at Khanderi village on Jamnagar highway, spread over 40 acres (160,000 m^{2}), some 10 km from Rajkot, Gujarat.

This stadium has a spectator capacity of 28,000 and plays host to international and IPL matches. The new stadium is a modern complex which has a cricket ground & stadium, basketball, tennis, volleyball, badminton and squash courts, a swimming pool and an indoor stadium.

The Madhavrao Scindia Cricket Ground has since been used only as a venue for First-class and List A matches for the Indian domestic team of Saurashtra.

== Ground Facts ==
- The highest partnership at the Madhavrao Scindia Cricket Ground is 196 by Saurav Ganguly and Virender Sehwag for India against West Indies in the 2003/2004 season.
- The highest score by an individual batsman at the Madhavrao Scindia Cricket Ground is 160 by Tillakaratne Dilshan for Sri Lanka against India on 15 December 2009.
- The highest ODI total at the Madhavrao Scindia Cricket Ground is 414/7 by India against Sri Lanka in the 2009 season, it is also the second Highest ODI Score for India until India scored 418/5 against West Indies.
- The lowest ODI total at the Madhavrao Scindia Cricket Ground is 176/9 by West Indies against Sri Lanka in the 1998 season.
- Most runs scored here were by Virendar Sehwag- 405 runs, Tillakaratne Dilshan 275 runs and Yuvraj Singh- 246 runs.
- Most wickets were by Venkatesh Prasad and Harbhajan Singh- 6 wickets and RP Singh- 5 wickets.

== List of Centuries ==
=== Key ===
- * denotes that the batsman was not out.
- Inns. denotes the number of the innings in the match.
- Balls denotes the number of balls faced in an innings.
- NR denotes that the number of balls was not recorded.
- Parentheses next to the player's score denotes his century number at Madhavrao Scindia Cricket Ground.
- The column title Date refers to the date the match started.
- The column title Result refers to the player's team result

=== One Day Internationals ===
No.	Score	Player	Team	Balls	Inns.	Opposing team	Date	Result
1	102	Raman Lamba	India	120	1	Australia	7 October 1986	Lost
2	110*	Viv Richards	West Indies	77	2	India	5 January 1988	Won
3	108	Navjot Singh Sidhu	India	132	1	Sri Lanka	15 February 1994	Won
4	120	Nathan Astle	New Zealand	136	1	India	5 November 1999	Won
5	114*	Virender Sehwag	India	82	2	West Indies	12 November 2002	Won
6	110	Kumar Sangakkara	Sri Lanka	127	1	India	11 February 2007	Won
7	138*	Yuvraj Singh	India	78	1	England	14 November 2008	Won
8	146	Virender Sehwag	India	102	1	Sri Lanka	15 December 2009	Won
9	160	Tillakaratne Dilshan	Sri Lanka	124	2	India	15 December 2009	Lost
