= Niranjan Shah =

Indian cricketer (born 1944)

Personal information
- Full name: Niranjan Rasiklal Shah
- Born: 4 June 1944 (age 82); Rajkot, Gujarat, India
- Batting: Left-handed
- Relatives: Jaydev Shah (son)

Domestic team information
- Years: Team
- 1965/66–1974/75: Saurashtra

Career statistics
Competition	FC
Matches	12
Runs scored	281
Batting average	11.70
100s/50s	0/0
Top score	45
Balls bowled	20
Wickets	0
Bowling average	–
5 wickets in innings	–
10 wickets in match	–
Best bowling	–
Catches/stumpings	5/–
- Source: ESPNcricinfo, 16 December 2015

Niranjan Shah (born 4 June 1944) is a former Indian first-class cricketer, businessman and cricket administrator. During his playing career, Shah played for Saurashtra from 1965/66 to 1974/75. He currently serves as the honorary secretary of the Saurashtra Cricket Association.

== Career ==
Shah started his cricket career while pursuing a B.Sc. at Dharmendra College and also went on to captain Saurashtra University. He appeared in 12 first-class matches playing for Saurashtra between the 1965/66 and 1974/75 seasons. He took over from Shatrusalyasinhji as the honorary secretary of Saurashtra Cricket Association in 1972 and has remained in the position ever since. Although, he never got a chance to play even a single international match, he has had over four decades of senior cricket administration, holding positions such as the honorary secretary of the Board of Control for Cricket in India (BCCI) (elected four times at the role), vice-president of BCCI from West Zone, and vice-chairman of Indian Premier League (IPL). In August 2015, he was elected to chair a five-member ad-hoc committee for the administration of cricket in the state of Bihar.

Currently, Shah is the honorary secretary of the Saurashtra Cricket Association, chairman of the National Cricket Academy Board and member of the disciplinary committee of the BCCI. He has been credited with the progress made by Saurashtra region in cricket including Saurashtra Cricket Association Stadium in Rajkot gaining the Test venue status and the town becoming the base of a new IPL team in December 2015.
