= Niranjan Shah Stadium =

Cricket stadium

Coordinates: 22.363°N 70.710°E

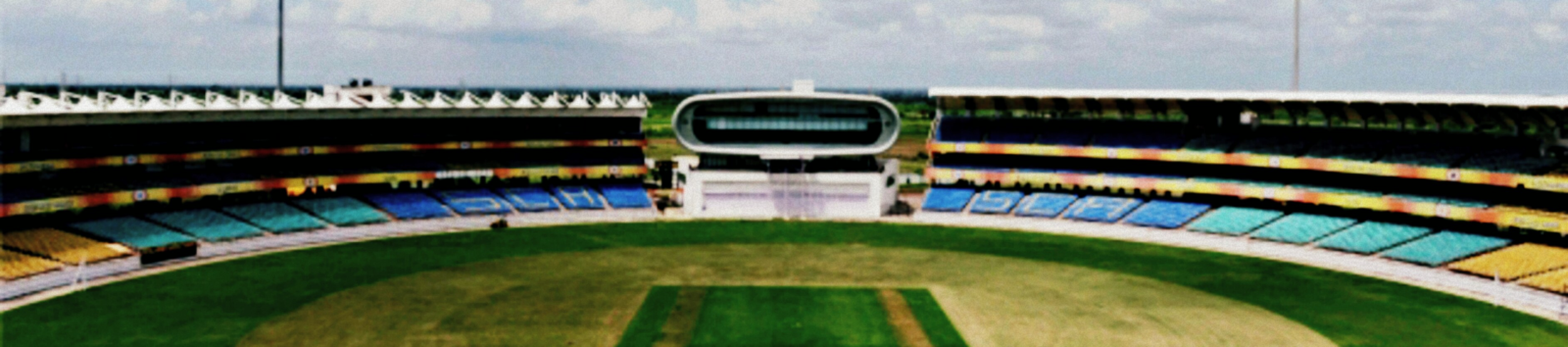
- Interactive map of Niranjan Shah Stadium

Ground information
- Location: Rajkot, Gujarat, India
- Country: India
- Establishment: 2008
- Capacity: 28,000
- Owner: Saurashtra Cricket Association
- Operator: Saurashtra Cricket Association
- Tenants: India national cricket team India women's national cricket team Saurashtra cricket team Saurashtra women's cricket team Gujarat Lions (defunct)
- End names
- Pavilion End; Media End

International information
- First men's Test: 9–13 November 2016: India v England
- Last men's Test: 15–18 February 2024: India v England
- First men's ODI: 11 January 2013: India v England
- Last men's ODI: 14 January 2026: India v New Zealand
- First men's T20I: 10 October 2013: India v Australia
- Last men's T20I: 28 January 2025: India v England
- First women's ODI: 10 January 2025: India v Ireland
- Last women's ODI: 15 January 2025: India v Ireland
- As of 15 January 2025; Source: ESPNcricinfo

Niranjan Shah Stadium (formerly known as Saurashtra Cricket Association Stadium), also known as Khandheri Cricket Stadium, is an international cricket stadium in Rajkot, India. It is India's second and Gujarat's first solar-powered stadium.

In 2013, the first international match took place in this stadium. In the same year, it hosted its first T20I between India and Australia, which India won by six wickets. In 2016, stadium hosted its first Test, India vs England. The match ended in a draw. Till date this venue has hosted multiple international Tests, ODIs and T20Is. This stadium also hosted several IPL matches during 2016-17, when Gujarat Lions opted for Rajkot as their home base.

== History ==
Initially, the stadium was being used for Ranji Trophy matches, when the spectator stands were still being constructed. With the stands completed, the grounds can hold 28,000 people. The stadium is a part of a larger planned sports complex that will include venues for other sports such as badminton, basketball, and volleyball. It hosts Saurashtra Cricket Association matches along with Madhavrao Scindia Cricket Ground.

The media box here is similar in design to the one at Lord's Cricket Ground, London.

A 30-acre portion of agricultural land next to the Jamnagar highway was acquired around 2004. Construction began in 2006 and the total cost, including land, is said to be around Rs 75 crore (around $14 million). The SCA shifted its offices from the seventh floor of a commercial building in the city to the stadium, which has been hosting matches since late 2008.

The complex has two playing fields: the main one inside the stadium, with a 90-yard outfield, and a smaller one outside, with a 70-yard outfield. The latter is used for outdoor nets, and also for district-level matches.

It also hosted its first T20 International match on 10 October 2013 between India and Australia during the Australia Tour of India Oct-Nov 2013. The match first saw Aaron Finch make 89 and then the return of Yuvraj Singh to international cricket in which he scored an unbeaten 77 as India chased down 201 runs.

In November 2015, the stadium was selected as one of the six new Test venues along with Maharashtra Cricket Association Stadium, JSCA International Stadium Complex, Holkar Stadium, Himachal Pradesh Cricket Association Stadium and Dr. Y.S. Rajasekhara Reddy ACA-VDCA Cricket Stadium in India. The stadium was the home ground of the Gujarat Lions in IPL 2016. It hosted five matches in the season.

On 9 November 2016, the stadium hosted its first Test match, which was played between England and India.

On 14 February 2024, the stadium was named after Niranjan Shah, a former first-class cricketer from Saurashtra and the honorary secretary of the Saurashtra Cricket Association, a day before the start of the 3rd test match.

== Sustainability efforts ==
Niranjan Shah Stadium has implemented a solar rooftop system. The system is designed to generate 82,000 units of solar power annually and contributes to a monthly saving of approximately ₹54,600 in electricity bills. Additionally, the stadium has plans for expanding its green power generation capabilities in the future.

== List of centuries ==
=== Key ===
- * denotes that the batsman was not out.
- Inns. denotes the number of the innings in the match.
- Balls denotes the number of balls faced in an innings.
- NR denotes that the number of balls was not recorded.
- The column title Date refers to the date the match started.

=== Tests ===
No.	Player	Team	Score	Balls	Inns.	Opposing team	Date
1	Joe Root	England	124	180	1	India	9 November 2016
2	Moeen Ali	England	117	213	1	India	9 November 2016
3	Ben Stokes	England	128	235	1	India	9 November 2016
4	Murali Vijay	India	126	301	2	England	9 November 2016
5	Cheteshwar Pujara	India	124	206	2	England	9 November 2016
6	Alastair Cook	England	130	243	3	India	9 November 2016
7	Prithvi Shaw	India	134	154	1	West Indies	24 October 2018
8	Virat Kohli	India	139	230	1	West Indies	24 October 2018
9	Ravindra Jadeja	India	100*	132	1	West Indies	24 October 2018
10	Rohit Sharma	India	131	196	1	England	15 February 2024
11	Ravindra Jadeja	India	112	225	1	England	15 February 2024
12	Ben Duckett	England	153	151	2	India	15 February 2024
13	Yashasvi Jaiswal	India	214*	236	3	England	15 February 2024

=== One-Day Internationals ===
No.	Player	Team	Score	Balls	Inns.	Opposing team	Date
1	Quinton de Kock	South Africa	103	118	1	India	18 October 2015
2	KL Rahul	India	112*	92	1	New Zealand	14 January 2026
3	Daryl Mitchell	New Zealand	131*	117	2	India	14 January 2026

=== Twenty20 Internationals ===
No.	Player	Team	Score	Balls	Inns.	Opposing team	Date	Result
1	Colin Munro	New Zealand	109*	58	1	India	4 November 2017	Won
2	Suryakumar Yadav	India	112*	51	1	Sri Lanka	7 January 2023	Won

== List of five-wicket hauls ==
=== Tests ===
No.	Bowler	Date	Team	Opposing Team	Inn	O	R	W	Result
1	Ravindra Jadeja	4 October 2018	India	West Indies	3	14	57	5	India won
2	Kuldeep Yadav	15 February 2024	India	England	4	12.4	41	5	India won
