= Saurashtra Cricket Association =

Governing body of cricket in the Saurashtra and Kutch regions of Gujarat state, India

- Sport: Cricket
- Jurisdiction: Saurashtra and Kutch, Gujarat, India
- Abbreviation: SCA
- Founded: 1950
- Affiliation: Board of Control for Cricket in India
- Affiliation date: 1960
- Regional affiliation: West
- Headquarters: Rajkot
- President: Jaydev Shah
- Secretary: Himanshu Shah
- Coach: Karsan Ghavri

Official website
- saucricket.com
- (India)

Saurashtra Cricket Association is the governing body of the cricket activities in the Saurashtra and Kutch regions of the Gujarat state in India and the Saurashtra cricket team. It is affiliated to the Board of Control for Cricket in India.

== History ==
It was founded in 1950.

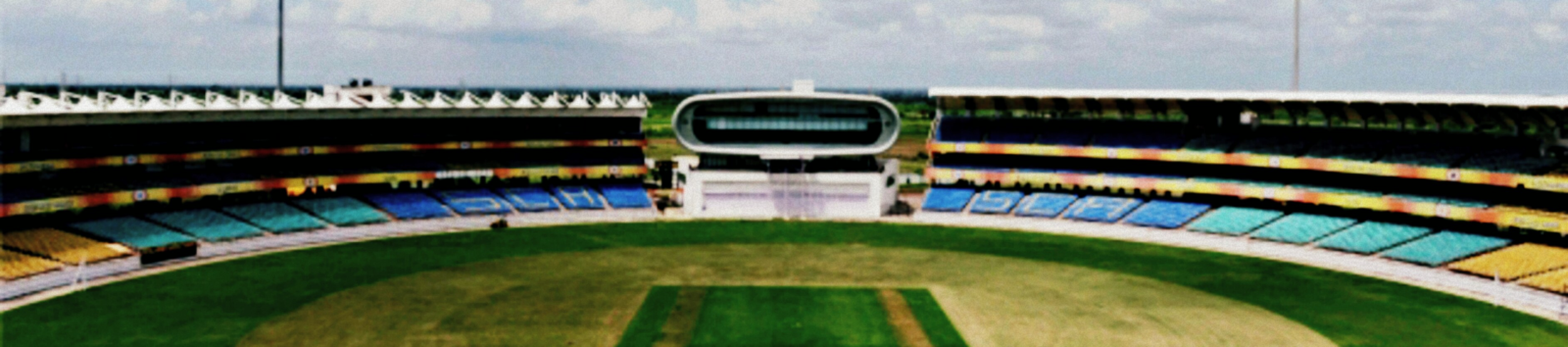
Niranjan Shah Stadium

== Saurashtra Premier League ==
The Saurashtra Premier League (SPL) was a men's Twenty20 (T20) cricket league in Saurashtra, Gujarat, India. The league was formed in 2019 by the Saurashtra Cricket Association. It was usually played during summer season between May - August. First begun in 2019, it was planned to be held annually. It was replaced in 2025, by the newer Twenty20 league named, Saurashtra Pro T20 League.

Saurashtra Premier League
- Countries: India
- Administrator: Saurashtra Cricket Association
- Format: T20
- First edition: 2019
- Latest edition: 2023
- Tournament format: Round-robin and final
- Number of teams: 5
- Current champion: Kutch Warriors (1 title)
- Most successful: Sorath Lions, Halar Heroes, Kutch Warriors (1 title)
- TV: Sports 18

=== Teams ===
Five city/region-based franchises competed in the league.

Team locations in Saurashtra and Kutch regions of Gujarat

Team	City/Region	Captain	Coach	Owner
Gohilwad Gladiators	Bhavnagar, Gohilwad	Prerak Mankad	Hitesh Goswami	Deepak Nakrani
Kutch Warriors	Bhuj, Kutch	Dharmendrasinh Jadeja	Virendra Vegda	Nilkanth Steel
Halar Heroes	Jamnagar, Halar	Jay Gohil	Paras Trivedi	Ajay Jadeja
Sorath Lions	Junagadh, Sorath	Chirag Jani	Rakesh Dhruv	Ashish Patel
Zalawad Royals	Surendranagar, Zalawad	Sheldon Jackson	Niraj Odedra	GSH Sports Global LLP

=== Venue ===
Gujarat
Rajkot
Niranjan Shah Stadium
Capacity: 28,000
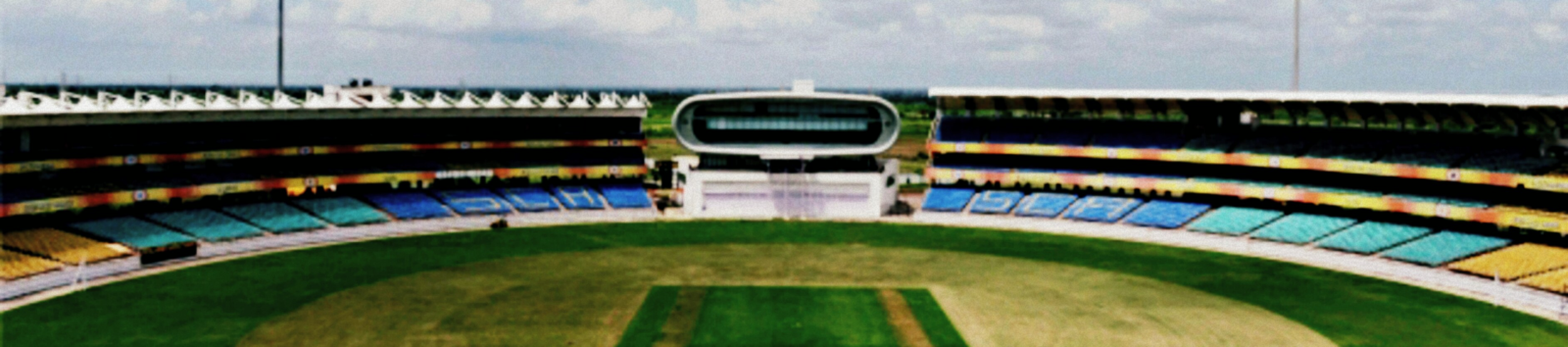

=== Results ===
Season	Final				Player of the series
Season	Venue	Winners	Result	Runners-up	Player of the series
2019	Niranjan Shah Stadium, Rajkot	Sorath Lions; 158/8(20)	Sorath Lions won by 5 runs Scorecard	Zalawad Royals; 153/8(20)	Chetan Sakariya
2022	Niranjan Shah Stadium, Rajkot	Halar Heroes 162/5(20 Overs)	Halar Heroes won By 40 runs Scorecard	Gohilwad Gladiators 122/10 (17.5 overs)	Prerak Mankad
2023	Niranjan Shah Stadium, Rajkot	Kutch Warriors 156/7(20 Overs)	Kutch Warriors won by 21 runs Scorecard	Gohilwad Gladiators 135/10	Parswaraj Rana

=== Team's performance ===
Season Franchise	2019	2022	2023
Gohilwad Gladiators	5th	RU	RU
Kutch Warriors	3rd	5th	C
Halar Heroes	4th	C	3rd
Sorath Lions	C	4th	5th
Zalawad Royals	RU	3rd	4th

- Teams are listed alphabetically by year of entry into the league
- C: Champions
- RU: Runners-up

== See also ==
- Andhra Premier League
- Bengal Pro T20 League
- Delhi Premier League T20
- Madhya Pradesh League
- Maharaja Trophy KSCA T20
- Rajasthan Premier League
- Sher-E-Punjab T20 Cup
- Tamil Nadu Premier League
