= Veda Krishnamurthy =

Indian cricketer

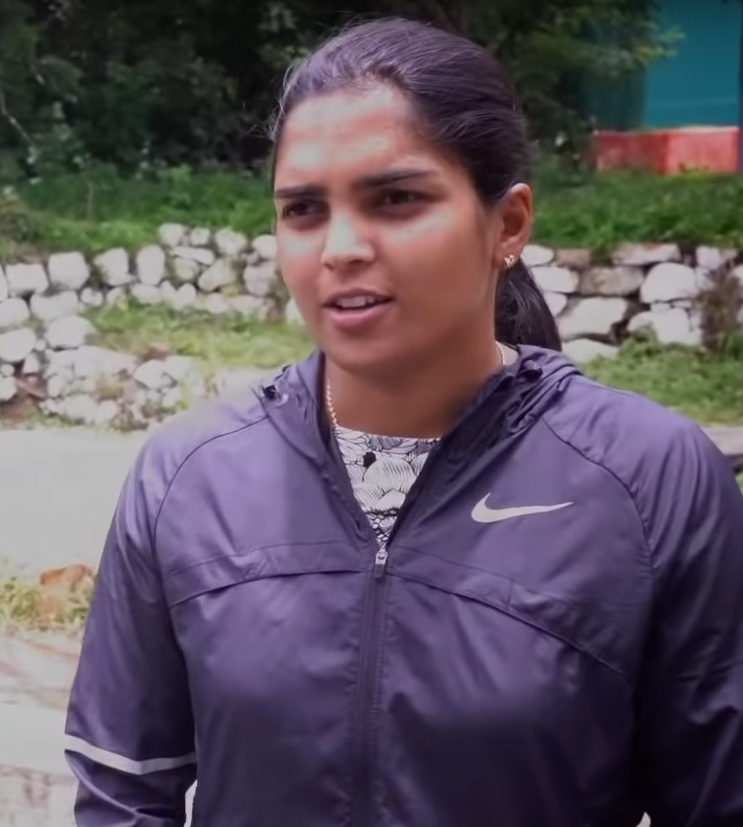
- Veda Krishnamurthy in 2019.

Personal information
- Born: 16 October 1992 (age 34); Kaduru, Karnataka, India
- Height: 1.62 m (5 ft 4 in)
- Batting: Right-handed
- Bowling: Right-arm leg break
- Role: Batter
- Relatives: Arjun Hoysala (husband)

International information
- National side: India (2011–2020)
- ODI debut (cap 96): 30 June 2011 v England
- Last ODI: 12 April 2018 v England
- ODI shirt no.: 79
- T20I debut (cap 26): 11 June 2011 v Australia
- Last T20I: 8 March 2020 v Australia
- T20I shirt no.: 79

Domestic team information
- Years: Team
- 2006/07–: Karnataka Women (squad no. 79)
- 2012/13–2018/19: Railways Women (squad no. 79)
- 2017/18: Hobart Hurricanes (squad no. 79)
- 2019–2020: Velocity (squad no. 79)
- 2024: Gujarat Giants

Career statistics
Competition	ODI	T20I
Matches	48	76
Runs scored	829	875
Batting average	25.90	18.61
100s/50s	0/8	0/2
Top score	71	57*
Balls bowled	114	12
Wickets	3	0
Bowling average	22.00	–
5 wickets in innings	0	–
10 wickets in match	0	–
Best bowling	2/14	–
Catches/stumpings	20/1	38/0
Medal record
Representing India
Women's cricket
World Cup
Runner-up	2017 England and Wales
T20 World Cup
Runner-up	2020 Australia
Women's Asia Cup
Winner	2016 Thailand
Runner-up	2018 Malaysia
- Source: ESPNcricinfo, 7 August 2025

Veda Krishnamurthy (born 16 October 1992) is a former Indian cricketer. She made her debut in international cricket at the age of 18 in a one day international (ODI) against England Women at Derby on 30 June 2011. Krishnamurthy went on to score 51 runs on her ODI international debut. She played as a right-handed batter and bowls right-arm legbreak.

== Early life ==
The youngest of four siblings in her family, Veda started playing street cricket when she was 3. As a young girl, she was enrolled for karate classes which she hated. However, she credits the martial arts form for building her strength from a young age. Veda even earned a black belt in karate at the age of 12. Her mother Cheluvamaba Devi and her elder sister Vatsala Shivakumar succumbed to COVID-19 in 2021.

She started her formal cricket training in the Karnataka Institute of Cricket in 2005 when she was 13. Realising her talent, the institute's director Irfan Sait urged Veda's father to shift her to Bengaluru to further hone her skills. The youngest daughter of a cable operator, her father moved from a small town in Karnataka's Kaduru to Bengaluru to help realise his daughter's dream of playing for the country one day. She was initially trained at Karnataka Institute of Cricket at Bengaluru.

Veda credits Irfan Sait as her first coach, who taught her the basics of the game. Coaches like Apurva Sharma and Suman Sharma also played a significant role in moulding her as a cricketer. She considered Mithali Raj as a role model when she was a child. Significantly, when Veda was 12, Mithali was felicitated at her school. Veda later went on to play with Mithali in both domestic and national teams.

== Cricket career ==
In November 2015, she was named in B-grade contract list, this was first time BCCI offered contracts to women players.

=== Domestic career ===
Karnataka State Cricket Association hosted their first-ever Twenty20 exhibition match between a KSCA President's XI and a KSCA Secretary's XI and Veda was chosen to lead the President's XI. In October 2017, she was signed by the Hobart Hurricanes for the 2017–18 Women's Big Bash League season. For the 2021 senior domestic one-day trophy, Veda was named captain of Karnataka and led the team all the way to the final, where they lost to the Railways.

In December 2023, she was signed by Gujarat Giants at the Women's Premier League auction, for the 2024 season.

=== International career ===
She made her debut in international cricket at the age of 18 in a one day international against England Women at Derby in June 2011 and went on to score 51 runs in that match. Meanwhile, her T20 debut for India was in a match against Australia in the Natwest T20 Quadrangular series at Billericay, on the same tour of England.

Krishnamurthy was part of the Indian team to reach the final of the 2017 Women's Cricket World Cup where the team lost to England by nine runs. The Indian team were chasing a target of 229 runs and required 29 off 33 balls with five wickets in hand when Veda lost her wicket. She scored 35 runs in the innings.

In the final league match of the 2017 Women's Cricket World Cup against New Zealand, Krishnamurthy came to bat in the 37th over. With a strike rate of over 150, she smashed 70 runs off just 45 balls, which included seven fours and two sixes, before getting run out on the penultimate ball of the innings. Her performance was highly lauded and it led the Indian side to the semi-finals of the series.

She is the third cricketer from India to play in the Big Bash. Krishnamurthy secured a deal with the Hobart Hurricanes (WBBL) for the third season of the WBBL. She joined the duo of Hayley Matthews and Lauren Winfield.

In October 2018, she was named in India's squad for the 2018 ICC Women's World Twenty20 tournament in the West Indies. In January 2020, she was named in India's squad for the 2020 ICC Women's T20 World Cup in Australia.

=== Retirement ===
On 25 July 2025, Krishnamurthy retired from all forms of cricket.

From a small-town girl with big dreams to wearing the India jersey with pride. Grateful for everything cricket gave me the lessons, the people, the memories. It’s time to say goodbye to playing, but not to the game.

— Veda Krishnamurthy – via Instagram, July 2025

=== Honour ===
In October, Krishnamurthy was awarded an honorary doctorate by Maharani Cluster University in Bengaluru for her service to sport and society.

== Personal life ==
Krishnamurthy has several nicknames. In the Railways and Indian teams, she has always been referred to as "Ved". At the Hurricanes, she was called "Darth" or "Darthy", a name chosen by Corinne Hall, after Darth Vader. In the Karnataka circuit, she is known as "Dhana". According to Krishnamurthy, that word "... literally translates to cow. But in context here, Dhana means a buffalo, because of my height. When I started playing, I was only four feet tall."

On 12 January 2023, she married Karnataka first-class cricketer Arjun Hoysala on her late mother's birthday, whom she lost to Covid in April 2021.
