= Mohsin Sayyed =

Indian cricketer (born 1995)

Personal information
- Born: 28 September 1995 (age 31); Paranda, India
- Source: ESPNcricinfo, 13 October 2016

Mohsin Sayyed (born 28 September 1995) is an Indian cricketer. He made his first-class debut for Maharashtra in the 2016–17 Ranji Trophy on 13 October 2016. Former cricketer and coach Surendra Bhave described Sayyed as "a young investment" and "pretty consistent" after taking 18 wickets in six matches. Prior to his first-class debut, Sayyed was named in India's squad for the 2012 Under-19 Cricket World Cup. However, he was ruled out of the tournament after being diagnosed with dengue fever.
