= Siddhesh Wath =

Indian cricketer (born 1997)

Personal information
- Born: 3 July 1997 (age 29); Nagpur, Maharashtra, India
- Batting: Right-handed
- Role: Wicketkeeper
- Source: ESPNcricinfo, 29 November 2016

Siddhesh Wath (born 3 July 1997) is an Indian first-class cricketer who plays for Vidarbha. He made his first-class debut for Vidarbha in the 2016–17 Ranji Trophy on 29 November 2016. He made his Twenty20 debut for Vidarbha in the 2016–17 Inter State Twenty-20 Tournament on 30 January 2017. He made his List A debut for Vidarbha in the 2016–17 Vijay Hazare Trophy on 6 March 2017.
