= Jay Chauhan (cricketer) =

Indian cricketer (born 1992)

Personal information
- Born: 6 October 1992; Rajkot, India
- Batting: Right-handed
- Source: ESPNcricinfo, 29 November 2016

Jay Chauhan (born 6 October 1992) is an Indian cricketer who plays for Saurashtra. He made his first-class debut for Saurashtra in the 2016-17 Ranji Trophy on 29 November 2016. He made his List A debut for Saurashtra in the 2018–19 Vijay Hazare Trophy on 6 October 2018. He made his Twenty20 debut for Saurashtra in the 2018–19 Syed Mushtaq Ali Trophy on 24 February 2019.
