= Vikash Singh =

Indian cricketer (born 1994)

Personal information
- Full name: Vikash Arun Singh
- Born: 28 June 1994 (age 32); Ranchi, Jharkhand, India
- Role: All-rounder
- Source: ESPNcricinfo, 27 October 2016

Vikash Singh (born 28 June 1994) is an Indian cricketer. He made his first-class debut for Jharkhand in the 2016–17 Ranji Trophy on 27 October 2016.
