= Amitkumar Gautam =

Indian cricketer (born 1995)

Personal information
- Born: 10 October 1995 (age 31); Dholpur, India
- Source: ESPNcricinfo, 6 November 2016

Amitkumar Gautam (born 10 October 1995) is an Indian cricketer. He made his first-class debut for Rajasthan in the 2016–17 Ranji Trophy on 5 November 2016. He made his List A debut for Rajasthan in the 2017–18 Vijay Hazare Trophy on 5 February 2018.
