= Lalit Yadav (Vidarbha cricketer) =

Indian cricketer (born 1995)

Personal information
- Full name: Lalit Manoharsingh Yadav
- Born: 17 December 1995 (age 30); Yavatmal, Maharashtra, India
- Source: ESPNcricinfo, 6 October 2016

Lalit Yadav (born 17 December 1995) is an Indian cricketer. He made his first-class debut for Vidarbha in the 2016–17 Ranji Trophy on 6 October 2016. He made his Twenty20 debut for Vidarbha in the 2016–17 Inter State Twenty-20 Tournament on 30 January 2017. He made his List A debut on 14 December 2021, for Odisha in the 2021–22 Vijay Hazare Trophy.
