= Dhiraj Singh =

Indian cricketer (born 1987)

Personal information
- Born: 21 November 1987 (age 38); Cuttack, Odisha, India
- Source: ESPNcricinfo, 12 December 2015

Dhiraj Singh (born 21 November 1987) is an Indian cricketer who plays for Odisha. He was the leading wicket-taker for Odisha in the 2018–19 Vijay Hazare Trophy, with ten dismissals in six matches.
