= Jaydev Shah =

Indian cricketer (born 1983)

Personal information
- Full name: Jaydev Niranjan Shah
- Born: 4 May 1983 (age 43); Rajkot, Gujarat, India
- Height: 5 ft 6 in (1.68 m)
- Batting: Left-handed
- Bowling: Right arm offbreak
- Role: Batsman
- Relatives: Niranjan Shah (father)

Domestic team information
- Years: Team
- 2002/03–2018/19: Saurashtra

Career statistics
Competition	FC	List A	T20
Matches	120	54	33
Runs scored	5354	1118	523
Batting average	29.40	21.50	16.34
100s/50s	10/21	2/2	0/0
Top score	217	101	49
Balls bowled	1,723	347	75
Wickets	10	2	7
Bowling average	91.75	177.00	15.14
5 wickets in innings	0	0	0
10 wickets in match	0	0	0
Best bowling	2/21	1/34	2/11
Catches/stumpings	24/–	8/–	11/–
- Source: ESPNcricinfo, 24 October 2010

Jaydev Niranjan Shah (born 4 May 1983) is an Indian former cricketer. Jaydev is the son of Niranjan Shah, former cricketer and ex-secretary of the Board of Control for Cricket in India, and represented Saurashtra cricket team in India's domestic circuit. He has the distinction of captaining Saurashtra to victory in the 2007-08 Vijay Hazare Trophy, the team's first ever national-level title. He was recruited by the Rajasthan Royals for the Indian Premier League 2008 edition, but never played, and has also represented Rajasthan Cricket Association President's XI in the past.

On 21 October 2016, he became the first captain of Saurashtra to score a double century, when he made 217 runs in their Ranji Trophy match against Maharashtra.

In December 2018, he announced that he would retire from all cricket following the Saurashtra's match against Karnataka in round five of the 2018–19 Ranji Trophy. He made match winning 97 runs in his final professional game against Karnataka.
