= Salman Khan (Indian cricketer) =

Indian cricketer (born 1998)

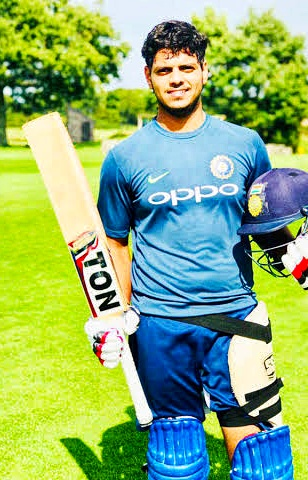

Personal information
- Full name: Salman Faruk Khan
- Born: 26 December 1998 (age 27); Jhalawar, Rajasthan, India
- Batting: Right-handed
- Bowling: Right arm offbreak
- Role: Batsman
- Source: Cricinfo, 13 November 2016

Salman Faruk Khan (born 26 December 1998) is an Indian cricketer. He made his first-class debut for Rajasthan in the 2016–17 Ranji Trophy on 5 November 2016, scoring 110 runs.
