= Arjun Hoysala =

Indian cricketer (born 1989)

Personal information
- Full name: A Arjun Hoysala
- Born: 18 October 1989 (age 37)
- Batting: Left-handed
- Bowling: Right-arm medium
- Relatives: Veda Krishnamurthy (wife)

Domestic team information
- Years: Team
- 2016: Karnataka
- Source: ESPNcricinfo, 7 December 2016

Arjun Hoysala (born 18 October 1989) is an Indian first-class cricketer who plays for Karnataka. He made his first-class debut for Karnataka against Maharashtra, in the 2016–17 Ranji Trophy, on 7 December 2016.

== Personal life ==
On 12 January 2023, he married Indian cricketer Veda Krishnamurthy.
