= Sandeep Pattnaik =

Indian cricketer (born 1998)

Personal information
- Full name: Sandeep Pradeep Pattnaik
- Born: 17 May 1998 (age 28); Bhubaneswar, Odisha, India
- Source: ESPNcricinfo, 6 October 2016

Sandeep Pattnaik (born 17 May 1998) is an Indian cricketer. He made his first-class debut for Odisha in the 2016–17 Ranji Trophy on 6 October 2016. He scored his maiden century in his second match for Odisha on 13 October 2016. He made his Twenty20 debut for Odisha in the 2016–17 Inter State Twenty-20 Tournament on 29 January 2017. He made his List A debut for Odisha in the 2016–17 Vijay Hazare Trophy on 25 February 2017.
