= Prerak Mankad =

Indian cricketer (born 1994)

Personal information
- Full name: Prerak Nileshkumar Mankad
- Born: 23 April 1994 (age 32); Sirohi, Rajasthan, India
- Batting: Right-handed
- Bowling: Right-arm medium
- Role: Batting allrounder

Domestic team information
- Years: Team
- 2016–present: Saurashtra
- 2022: Punjab Kings
- 2023: Lucknow Super Giants

Career statistics
Competition	FC	LA	T20
Matches	35	43	34
Runs scored	1591	1353	763
Batting average	33.08	39.79	33.17
100s/50s	1/11	3/7	0/6
Top score	126	174	72
Balls bowled	2950	1290	426
Wickets	35	30	20
Bowling average	37.17	33.26	30.55
5 wickets in innings	0	0	0
10 wickets in match	0	0	0
Best bowling	4/46	4/54	4/48
Catches/stumpings	29/–	17/–	16/–
- Source: ESPNcricinfo, 1 April 2022

Prerak Mankad (born 23 April 1994) is an Indian cricketer who plays for Saurashtra.

== Cricketing career ==
On 24 February 2016 he made his first-class debut in the final of the 2015–16 Ranji Trophy. He made his List A debut for Saurashtra in the 2016–17 Vijay Hazare Trophy on 25 February 2017.

He was the leading run-scorer for Saurashtra in the 2018–19 Vijay Hazare Trophy, with 212 runs in six matches. In February 2022, he was bought by the Punjab Kings in the auction for the 2022 Indian Premier League tournament. In the 2023 edition of IPL, he was bought by Lucknow Super Giants.
