= Subhranshu Senapati =

Indian cricketer

Personal information
- Full name: Subhranshu Pradeep Senapati
- Born: 30 December 1996 (age 29); Kendujhar, Odisha, India
- Batting: Right-handed
- Bowling: Right-arm medium
- Role: Batsman

Domestic team information
- Years: Team
- 2016/17–2023/24: Odisha
- 2024/25: Madhya Pradesh
- 2025/26–: Odisha
- 2025: Odisha Pro T20 League

Career statistics
Competition	FC	LA	T20
Matches	58	53	49
Runs scored	3,264	1,479	1,336
Batting average	37.09	36.07	31.80
100s/50s	8/14	2/9	1/5
Top score	277	119*	119*
Catches/stumpings	20/–	17/–	24/–
- Source: ESPNcricinfo, 16 October 2025

Subhranshu Senapati (born 30 December 1996) is an Indian cricketer. He made his first-class debut for Odisha in the 2016–17 Ranji Trophy on 6 October 2016. He made his Twenty20 debut for Odisha in the 2016–17 Inter State Twenty-20 Tournament on 3 February 2017. He made his List A debut for Odisha in the 2016–17 Vijay Hazare Trophy on 25 February 2017.

He was the leading run-scorer for Odisha in the 2017–18 Ranji Trophy, with 427 runs in six matches. He was also the leading run-scorer for Odisha in the 2018–19 Ranji Trophy, with 617 runs in nine matches. In February 2022, he was bought by the Chennai Super Kings in the auction for the 2022 Indian Premier League tournament. He was retained by Chennai Super Kings for 2023 Indian Premier League.
