= Murtaza Trunkwala =

Indian cricketer (born 1996)

Personal information
- Born: 20 January 1996 (age 30); Baramati, India
- Source: ESPNcricinfo, 22 October 2016

Murtaza Trunkwala (born 20 January 1996) is an Indian cricketer. He made his first-class debut for Maharashtra in the 2016–17 Ranji Trophy on 20 October 2016. He made his List A debut for Maharashtra in the 2017–18 Vijay Hazare Trophy on 17 February 2018.
