= 2022 Indian Premier League =

Cricket tournament

- Dates: 26 March – 29 May 2022
- Administrator: Board of Control for Cricket in India (BCCI)
- Cricket format: Twenty20
- Tournament format(s): Group stage and playoffs
- Champions: Gujarat Titans (1st title)
- Runners-up: Rajasthan Royals
- Participants: 10
- Matches: 74
- Most valuable player: Jos Buttler (Rajasthan Royals)
- Most runs: Jos Buttler (Rajasthan Royals) (863)
- Most wickets: Yuzvendra Chahal (Rajasthan Royals) (27)
- Official website: iplt20.com

The 2022 Indian Premier League (also known as IPL 15 or for sponsorship reasons, TATA IPL 2022) was the fifteenth season of the Indian Premier League (IPL), a professional Twenty20 cricket league established by the Board of Control for Cricket in India (BCCI) in 2007. The tournament was played from 26 March 2022 to 29 May 2022. The group stage of the tournament was played entirely in the state of Maharashtra, with Mumbai, Navi Mumbai and Pune hosting matches.

The season saw the expansion of the league with the addition of two new franchises. Chennai Super Kings were the defending champions, having won their fourth title during the previous season.

In the final, Gujarat Titans beat Rajasthan Royals, by seven wickets to win their maiden title in their first season.

== Background ==
Although earlier reports suggested the addition of two more teams in the previous season, the BCCI delayed the expansion of the league until 2022. In August 2021, it was confirmed that two new franchises would join the league in 2022, with a shortlist of locations including Ahmedabad, Cuttack, Dharamshala, Guwahati, Indore and Lucknow.

In a closed bidding auction held in October 2021, RPSG Group and CVC Capital won the right to the two new franchises. RPSG paid ₹7,090 crore (US$740 million) for the Lucknow franchise, and CVC won the Ahmedabad franchise for ₹5,625 crore (US$580 million). The Lucknow team was named as Lucknow Super Giants in January 2022, and the Ahmedabad team was named as Gujarat Titans the following month.

Vivo pulled out as the title sponsor of the tournament on 11 January 2022, having previously withdrawn as sponsors in 2020 and later signing a contract until 2023. The Tata Group was later named as the replacement title sponsor for the remainder of Vivo's contract.

== Personnel changes ==
Each existing team was allowed to retain a maximum of four players, with the two new teams were allowed to select a maximum of three players before the auction. The retained players of the existing eight teams were announced on 30 November 2021, and the two new teams named their selections on 22 January 2022.

The player auction to complete team squads took place on 12 and 13 February 2022 in Bangalore. Ishan Kishan was the most expensive buy of the auction, bought by Mumbai Indians for ₹15.25 crore (US$1.6 million). The most expensive overseas player was Liam Livingstone, bought by Punjab Kings for ₹11.50 crore (US$1.2 million).

== Format ==
With the introduction of the new teams, a ten-team format was created based on minor opponent rule, consisting of 74 matches with each team playing 14 matches. The ten teams were divided into two groups of five. BCCI has announced in the group stage each team will be playing twice against the teams in their group and against the team in the same row in the other group; against the remaining four teams in the other group, each team will play only once. The format is similar to the one used in 2011, although in 2022 the teams were drawn into groups according to seeding, instead of being drawn randomly.

Group A	Group B
Mumbai Indians	Chennai Super Kings
Kolkata Knight Riders	Sunrisers Hyderabad
Rajasthan Royals	Royal Challengers Bangalore
Delhi Capitals	Punjab Kings
Lucknow Super Giants	Gujarat Titans

== Venues ==
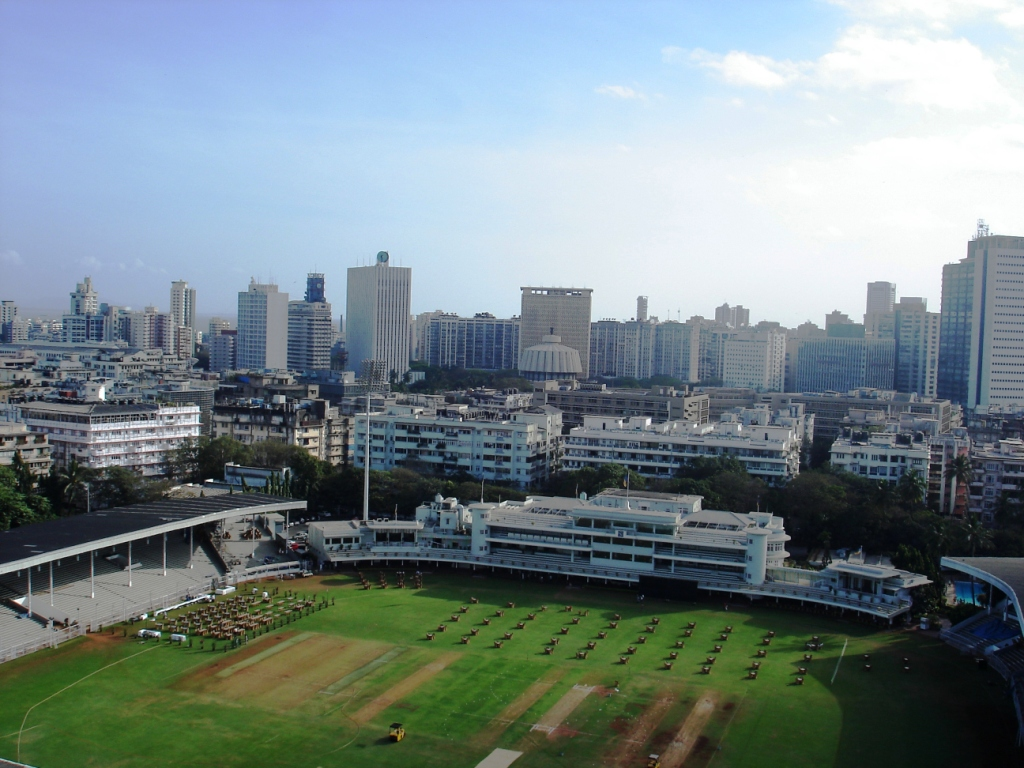
Brabourne Stadium in Mumbai

Three venues in Mumbai and one in Pune hosted the league stage matches. The original schedule for the tournament had 20 matches each at the Wankhede Stadium and the DY Patil Stadium in Mumbai, with Mumbai's Brabourne Stadium and the MCA International Stadium in Pune hosting 15 matches each. Every team were scheduled to play four matches each at the Wankhede Stadium and the DY Patil Stadium, and three matches each at the Brabourne Stadium and the MCA Stadium

Due to COVID-19 cases within the Delhi Capitals camp, two matches were relocated from the MCA International Stadium in Pune.

2022 venues

Stage	City	Stadium	Capacity
League	Mumbai	Wankhede Stadium	33,108
League	Mumbai	Brabourne Stadium	20,000
League	Mumbai	DY Patil Stadium	55,000
League	Pune	MCA International Stadium	45,000
Playoffs	Kolkata	Eden Gardens	65,000
Playoffs	Ahmedabad	Narendra Modi Stadium	130,000

== Incident ==
Pravin Amre was suspended for a game while Rishabh Pant and Shardul Thakur were fined after disagreeing with an umpire over a ball which was not called as a no ball during a match between Delhi Capitals and Rajasthan Royals. Pant, captaining Delhi Capitals, called his batsmen off the ground with the intention of abandoning the game in protest.

== Standings ==
=== Points table ===
Pos	Grp	Team	Pld	W	L	NR	Pts	NRR	Qualification
1	B	Gujarat Titans (C)	14	10	4	0	20	0.316	Advanced to Qualifier 1
2	A	Rajasthan Royals (R)	14	9	5	0	18	0.298	Advanced to Qualifier 1
3	A	Lucknow Super Giants (4th)	14	9	5	0	18	0.251	Advanced to Eliminator
4	B	Royal Challengers Bangalore (3rd)	14	8	6	0	16	−0.253	Advanced to Eliminator
5	A	Delhi Capitals	14	7	7	0	14	0.204	
6	B	Punjab Kings	14	7	7	0	14	0.126	
7	A	Kolkata Knight Riders	14	6	8	0	12	0.146	
8	B	Sunrisers Hyderabad	14	6	8	0	12	−0.379	
9	B	Chennai Super Kings	14	4	10	0	8	−0.203	
10	A	Mumbai Indians	14	4	10	0	8	−0.506	

Source: IPLT20.com
(C) Champions; (R) Runners-up
The four top-ranked teams qualified for the playoffs.

=== Match summary ===
Team	Group matches														Playoffs			
Team	1	2	3	4	5	6	7	8	9	10	11	12	13	14	Q1	E	Q2	F
Chennai Super Kings	0	0	0	0	2	2	4	4	6	6	8	8	8	8				
Delhi Capitals	2	2	2	4	4	6	6	8	8	10	10	12	14	14				
Gujarat Titans	2	4	6	6	8	10	12	14	16	16	16	18	20	20	W			W
Kolkata Knight Riders	2	2	4	6	6	6	6	6	6	8	8	10	12	12				
Lucknow Super Giants	0	2	4	6	6	8	8	10	12	14	16	16	16	18		L		
Mumbai Indians	0	0	0	0	0	0	0	0	2	4	4	6	6	8				
Punjab Kings	2	2	4	4	6	6	6	8	8	10	10	12	12	14				
Rajasthan Royals	2	4	4	6	6	8	10	12	12	12	14	14	16	18	L		W	L
Royal Challengers Bengaluru	0	2	4	6	6	8	10	10	10	10	12	14	14	16		W	L	
Sunrisers Hyderabad	0	0	2	4	6	8	10	10	10	10	10	10	12	12				

Win	Loss	No result

- Note: The total points at the end of each group match are listed.
- Note: Click on the points (group matches) or W/L (playoffs) to see the match summary.

Visitor team →	CSK	DC	GT	KKR	LSG	MI	PBKS	RR	RCB	SRH
Home team ↓	CSK	DC	GT	KKR	LSG	MI	PBKS	RR	RCB	SRH
Chennai Super Kings		Chennai; 91 runs	Gujarat; 7 wickets	Kolkata; 6 wickets		Mumbai; 5 wickets	Punjab; 54 runs		Chennai; 23 runs	Hyderabad; 8 wickets
Delhi Capitals				Delhi; 4 wickets	Lucknow; 6 runs	Delhi; 4 wickets	Delhi; 9 wickets	Rajasthan; 15 runs	Bengaluru; 16 runs	Delhi; 21 runs
Gujarat Titans	Gujarat; 3 wickets	Gujarat; 14 runs			Gujarat; 5 wickets	Mumbai; 5 runs	Punjab; 8 wickets		Gujarat; 6 wickets	Gujarat; 5 wickets
Kolkata Knight Riders		Delhi; 44 runs	Gujarat; 8 runs		Lucknow; 2 runs	Kolkata; 5 wickets	Kolkata; 6 wickets	Kolkata; 7 wickets		Kolkata; 54 runs
Lucknow Super Giants	Lucknow; 6 wickets	Lucknow; 6 wickets	Gujarat; 62 runs	Lucknow; 75 runs		Lucknow; 36 runs		Rajasthan; 24 runs	Bengaluru; 18 runs	
Mumbai Indians	Chennai; 3 wickets	Mumbai; 5 wickets		Kolkata; 52 runs	Lucknow; 18 runs		Punjab; 12 runs	Rajasthan; 23 runs		Hyderabad; 3 runs
Punjab Kings	Punjab; 11 runs	Delhi; 17 runs	Gujarat; 6 wickets		Lucknow; 20 runs			Rajasthan; 6 wickets	Punjab; 5 wickets	Hyderabad; 7 wickets
Rajasthan Royals	Rajasthan; 5 wickets	Delhi; 8 wickets	Gujarat; 37 runs	Rajasthan; 7 runs	Rajasthan; 3 runs	Mumbai; 6 wickets			Bengaluru; 4 wickets	
Royal Challengers Bengaluru	Bengaluru; 13 runs		Bengaluru; 8 wickets	Bengaluru; 3 wickets		Bengaluru; 7 wickets	Punjab; 54 runs	Rajasthan; 29 runs		Hyderabad; 9 wickets
Sunrisers Hyderabad	Chennai; 13 runs		Hyderabad; 8 wickets	Hyderabad; 7 wickets	Lucknow; 12 runs		Punjab; 5 wickets	Rajasthan; 61 runs	Bengaluru; 67 runs	

Home team won	Visitor team won

- Note: Results listed are according to the home (horizontal) and visitor (vertical) teams.
- Note: Click on a result to see a summary of the match.

== League stage ==
The schedule for the group stages was published on the official IPL website on 6 March 2022.

=== Matches ===
Match 1
26 March 2022
19:30 (N)
Scorecard

Chennai Super Kings; 131/5 (20 overs)	v	Kolkata Knight Riders; 133/4 (18.3 overs)
MS Dhoni 50* (38); Umesh Yadav 2/20 (4 overs)		Ajinkya Rahane 44 (34); Dwayne Bravo 3/20 (4 overs)

Kolkata Knight Riders won by 6 wickets
Wankhede Stadium, Mumbai
Umpires: Anil Chaudhary (Ind) and Nitin Menon (Ind)
Player of the match: Umesh Yadav (Kolkata Knight Riders)

- Kolkata Knight Riders won the toss and elected to field.

Match 2
27 March 2022
15:30 (D/N)
Scorecard

Mumbai Indians; 177/5 (20 overs)	v	Delhi Capitals; 179/6 (18.2 overs)
Ishan Kishan 81* (48); Kuldeep Yadav 3/18 (4 overs)		Lalit Yadav 48* (38); Basil Thampi 3/35 (4 overs)

Delhi Capitals won by 4 wickets
Brabourne Stadium, Mumbai
Umpires: Saiyed Khalid (Ind) and Rod Tucker (Aus)
Player of the match: Kuldeep Yadav (Delhi Capitals)

- Delhi Capitals won the toss and elected to field.

Match 3
27 March 2022
19:30 (N)
Scorecard

Royal Challengers Bangalore; 205/2 (20 overs)	v	Punjab Kings; 208/5 (19 overs)
Faf du Plessis 88 (57); Rahul Chahar 1/22 (4 overs)		Bhanuka Rajapaksa 43 (22); Mohammed Siraj 2/59 (4 overs)

Punjab Kings won by 5 wickets
DY Patil Stadium, Navi Mumbai
Umpires: Yeshwant Barde (Ind) and Nitin Menon (Ind)
Player of the match: Odean Smith (Punjab Kings)

- Punjab Kings won the toss and elected to field.
- Raj Angad Bawa (Punjab Kings) made his T20 debut.

Match 4
28 March 2022
19:30 (N)
Scorecard

Lucknow Super Giants; 158/6 (20 overs)	v	Gujarat Titans; 161/5 (19.4 overs)
Deepak Hooda 55 (41); Mohammed Shami 3/25 (4 overs)		Rahul Tewatia 40* (24); Dushmantha Chameera 2/22 (3 overs)

Gujarat Titans won by 5 wickets
Wankhede Stadium, Mumbai
Umpires: Pashchim Pathak (Ind) and Virender Sharma (Ind)
Player of the match: Mohammed Shami (Gujarat Titans)

- Gujarat Titans won the toss and elected to field.

Match 5
29 March 2022
19:30 (N)
Scorecard

Rajasthan Royals; 210/6 (20 overs)	v	Sunrisers Hyderabad; 149/7 (20 overs)
Sanju Samson 55 (27); Umran Malik 2/39 (4 overs)		Aiden Markram 57* (41); Yuzvendra Chahal 3/22 (4 overs)

Rajasthan Royals won by 61 runs
MCA International Stadium, Pune
Umpires: Ulhas Gandhe (Ind) and Bruce Oxenford (Aus)
Player of the match: Sanju Samson (Rajasthan Royals)

- Sunrisers Hyderabad won the toss and elected to field.

Match 6
30 March 2022
19:30 (N)
Scorecard

Kolkata Knight Riders; 128 (18.5 overs)	v	Royal Challengers Bangalore; 132/7 (19.2 overs)
Andre Russell 25 (18); Wanindu Hasaranga 4/20 (4 overs)		Sherfane Rutherford 28 (40); Tim Southee 3/20 (4 overs)

Royal Challengers Bangalore won by 3 wickets
DY Patil Stadium, Navi Mumbai
Umpires: Jayaraman Madanagopal (Ind) and Navdeep Singh (Ind)
Player of the match: Wanindu Hasaranga (Royal Challengers Bangalore)

- Royal Challengers Bangalore won the toss and elected to field.

Match 7
31 March 2022
19:30 (N)
Scorecard

Chennai Super Kings; 210/7 (20 overs)	v	Lucknow Super Giants; 211/4 (19.3 overs)
Robin Uthappa 50 (27); Ravi Bishnoi 2/24 (4 overs)		Quinton de Kock 61 (45); Dwaine Pretorius 2/31 (4 overs)

Lucknow Super Giants won by 6 wickets
Brabourne Stadium, Mumbai
Umpires: Virender Sharma (Ind) and Rod Tucker (Aus)
Player of the match: Evin Lewis (Lucknow Super Giants)

- Lucknow Super Giants won the toss and elected to field.

Match 8
1 April 2022
19:30 (N)
Scorecard

Punjab Kings; 137 (18.2 overs)	v	Kolkata Knight Riders; 141/4 (14.3 overs)
Bhanuka Rajapaksa 31 (9); Umesh Yadav 4/23 (4 overs)		Andre Russell 70* (31); Rahul Chahar 2/13 (4 overs)

Kolkata Knight Riders won by 6 wickets
Wankhede Stadium, Mumbai
Umpires: Anil Chaudhary (Ind) and Saiyed Khalid (Ind)
Player of the match: Umesh Yadav (Kolkata Knight Riders)

- Kolkata Knight Riders won the toss and elected to field.

Match 9
2 April 2022
15:30 (D/N)
Scorecard

Rajasthan Royals; 193/8 (20 overs)	v	Mumbai Indians; 170/8 (20 overs)
Jos Buttler 100 (68); Jasprit Bumrah 3/17 (4 overs)		Tilak Varma 61 (33); Yuzvendra Chahal 2/26 (4 overs)

Rajasthan Royals won by 23 runs
DY Patil Stadium, Navi Mumbai
Umpires: Nitin Menon (Ind) and Pashchim Pathak (Ind)
Player of the match: Jos Buttler (Rajasthan Royals)

- Mumbai Indians won the toss and elected to field.

Match 10
2 April 2022
19:30 (N)
Scorecard

Gujarat Titans; 171/6 (20 overs)	v	Delhi Capitals; 157/9 (20 overs)
Shubman Gill 84 (46); Mustafizur Rahman 3/23 (4 overs)		Rishabh Pant 43 (29); Lockie Ferguson 4/28 (4 overs)

Gujarat Titans won by 14 runs
MCA International Stadium, Pune
Umpires: K. N. Ananthapadmanabhan (Ind) and Ulhas Gandhe (Ind)
Player of the match: Lockie Ferguson (Gujarat Titans)

- Delhi Capitals won the toss and elected to field.

Match 11
3 April 2022
19:30 (N)
Scorecard

Punjab Kings; 180/8 (20 overs)	v	Chennai Super Kings; 126 (18 overs)
Liam Livingstone 60 (32); Chris Jordan 2/23 (4 overs)		Shivam Dube 57 (30); Rahul Chahar 3/25 (4 overs)

Punjab Kings won by 54 runs
Brabourne Stadium, Mumbai
Umpires: Yeshwant Barde (Ind) and Rod Tucker (Aus)
Player of the match: Liam Livingstone (Punjab Kings)

- Chennai Super Kings won the toss and elected to field.

Match 12
4 April 2022
19:30 (N)
Scorecard

Lucknow Super Giants; 169/7 (20 overs)	v	Sunrisers Hyderabad; 157/9 (20 overs)
KL Rahul 68 (50); T. Natarajan 2/26 (4 overs)		Rahul Tripathi 44 (30); Avesh Khan 4/24 (4 overs)

Lucknow Super Giants won by 12 runs
DY Patil Stadium, Navi Mumbai
Umpires: Jayaraman Madanagopal (Ind) and Navdeep Singh (Ind)
Player of the match: Avesh Khan (Lucknow Super Giants)

- Sunrisers Hyderabad won the toss and elected to field.

Match 13
5 April 2022
19:30 (N)
Scorecard

Rajasthan Royals; 169/3 (20 overs)	v	Royal Challengers Bangalore; 173/6 (19.1 overs)
Jos Buttler 70* (47); Harshal Patel 1/18 (4 overs)		Shahbaz Ahmed 45 (26); Yuzvendra Chahal 2/15 (4 overs)

Royal Challengers Bangalore won by 4 wickets
Wankhede Stadium, Mumbai
Umpires: Anil Chaudhary (Ind) and Saiyed Khalid (Ind)
Player of the match: Dinesh Karthik (Royal Challengers Bangalore)

- Royal Challengers Bangalore won the toss and elected to field.

Match 14
6 April 2022
19:30 (N)
Scorecard

Mumbai Indians; 161/4 (20 overs)	v	Kolkata Knight Riders; 162/5 (16 overs)
Suryakumar Yadav 52 (36); Pat Cummins 2/49 (4 overs)		Pat Cummins 56* (15); Murugan Ashwin 2/25 (3 overs)

Kolkata Knight Riders won by 5 wickets
MCA International Stadium, Pune
Umpires: K. N. Ananthapadmanabhan (Ind) and Bruce Oxenford (Aus)
Player of the match: Pat Cummins (Kolkata Knight Riders)

- Kolkata Knight Riders won the toss and elected to field.
- Pat Cummins (Kolkata Knight Riders) scored the joint-fastest half-century in the IPL (14 balls).

Match 15
7 April 2022
19:30 (N)
Scorecard

Delhi Capitals; 149/3 (20 overs)	v	Lucknow Super Giants; 155/4 (19.4 overs)
Prithvi Shaw 61 (34); Ravi Bishnoi 2/22 (4 overs)		Quinton de Kock 80 (52); Kuldeep Yadav 2/31 (3.4 overs)

Lucknow Super Giants won by 6 wickets
DY Patil Stadium, Navi Mumbai
Umpires: Tapan Sharma (Ind) and Rod Tucker (Aus)
Player of the match: Quinton de Kock (Lukhnow Super Giants)

- Lucknow Super Giants won the toss and elected to field.

Match 16
8 April 2022
19:30 (N)
Scorecard

Punjab Kings; 189/9 (20 overs)	v	Gujarat Titans; 190/4 (20 overs)
Liam Livingstone 64 (27); Rashid Khan 3/22 (4 overs)		Shubman Gill 96 (59); Kagiso Rabada 2/35 (4 overs)

Gujarat Titans won by 6 wickets
Brabourne Stadium, Mumbai
Umpires: Anil Chaudhary (Ind) and Virender Sharma (Ind)
Player of the match: Shubman Gill (Gujarat Titans)

- Gujarat Titans won the toss and elected to field.

Match 17
9 April 2022
15:30 (D/N)
Scorecard

Chennai Super Kings; 154/7 (20 overs)	v	Sunrisers Hyderabad; 155/2 (17.4 overs)
Moeen Ali 48 (35); Washington Sundar 2/21 (4 overs)		Abhishek Sharma 75 (50); Dwayne Bravo 1/29 (2.4 overs)

Sunrisers Hyderabad won by 8 wickets
DY Patil Stadium, Navi Mumbai
Umpires: Nitin Menon (Ind) and Navdeep Singh (Ind)
Player of the match: Abhishek Sharma (Sunrisers Hyderabad)

- Sunrisers Hyderabad won the toss and elected to field.

Match 18
9 April 2022
19:30 (N)
Scorecard

Mumbai Indians; 151/6 (20 overs)	v	Royal Challengers Bangalore; 152/3 (18.3 overs)
Suryakumar Yadav 68* (37); Harshal Patel 2/23 (4 overs)		Anuj Rawat 66 (47); Dewald Brevis 1/8 (0.3 overs)

Royal Challengers Bangalore won by 7 wickets
MCA International Stadium, Pune
Umpires: K. N. Ananthapadmanabhan (Ind) and Bruce Oxenford (Aus)
Player of the match: Anuj Rawat (Royal Challengers Bangalore)

- Royal Challengers Bangalore won the toss and elected to field.

Match 19
10 April 2022
15:30 (D/N)
Scorecard

Delhi Capitals; 215/5 (20 overs)	v	Kolkata Knight Riders; 171 (19.4 overs)
David Warner 61 (45); Sunil Narine 2/21 (4 overs)		Shreyas Iyer 54 (33); Kuldeep Yadav 4/35 (4 overs)

Delhi Capitals won by 44 runs
Brabourne Stadium, Mumbai
Umpires: Chris Gaffaney (NZ) and Jayaraman Madanagopal (Ind)
Player of the match: Kuldeep Yadav (Delhi Capitals)

- Kolkata Knight Riders won the toss and elected to field.

Match 20
10 April 2022
19:30 (N)
Scorecard

Rajasthan Royals; 165/6 (20 overs)	v	Lucknow Super Giants; 162/8 (20 overs)
Shimron Hetmyer 59* (36); Krishnappa Gowtham 2/30 (4 overs)		Quinton de Kock 39 (32); Yuzvendra Chahal 4/41 (4 overs)

Rajasthan Royals won by 3 runs
Wankhede Stadium, Mumbai
Umpires: Anil Chaudhary (Ind) and Tapan Sharma (Ind)
Player of the match: Yuzvendra Chahal (Rajasthan Royals)

- Lucknow Super Giants won the toss and elected to field.

Match 21
11 April 2022
19:30 (N)
Scorecard

Gujarat Titans; 162/7 (20 overs)	v	Sunrisers Hyderabad; 168/2 (19.1 overs)
Hardik Pandya 50* (42); T. Natarajan 2/34 (4 overs)		Kane Williamson 57 (46); Hardik Pandya 1/27 (4 overs)

Sunrisers Hyderabad won by 8 wickets
DY Patil Stadium, Navi Mumbai
Umpires: Chirra Ravikanthreddy (Ind) and Rod Tucker (Aus)
Player of the match: Kane Williamson (Sunrisers Hyderabad)

- Sunrisers Hyderabad won the toss and elected to field.

Match 22
12 April 2022
19:30 (N)
Scorecard

Chennai Super Kings; 216/4 (20 overs)	v	Royal Challengers Bangalore; 193/9 (20 overs)
Shivam Dube 95* (46); Wanindu Hasaranga 2/35 (3 overs)		Shahbaz Ahmed 41 (27); Maheesh Theekshana 4/33 (4 overs)

Chennai Super Kings won by 23 runs
DY Patil Stadium, Navi Mumbai
Umpires: Nitin Menon (Ind) and Nitin Pandit (Ind)
Player of the match: Shivam Dube (Chennai Super Kings)

- Royal Challengers Bangalore won the toss and elected to field.

Match 23
13 April 2022
19:30 (N)
Scorecard

Punjab Kings; 198/5 (20 overs)	v	Mumbai Indians; 186/9 (20 overs)
Shikhar Dhawan 70 (50); Basil Thampi 2/47 (4 overs)		Dewald Brevis 49 (25); Odean Smith 4/30 (3 overs)

Punjab Kings won by 12 runs
MCA International Stadium, Pune
Umpires: Ulhas Gandhe (Ind) and Bruce Oxenford (Aus)
Player of the match: Mayank Agarwal (Punjab Kings)

- Mumbai Indians won the toss and elected to field.

Match 24
14 April 2022
19:30 (N)
Scorecard

Gujarat Titans; 192/4 (20 overs)	v	Rajasthan Royals; 155/9 (20 overs)
Hardik Pandya 87* (52); Riyan Parag 1/12 (1 over)		Jos Buttler 54 (24); Lockie Ferguson 3/23 (4 overs)

Gujarat Titans won by 37 runs
DY Patil Stadium, Navi Mumbai
Umpires: Chris Gaffaney (NZ) and Rohan Pandit (Ind)
Player of the match: Hardik Pandya (Gujarat Titans)

- Rajasthan Royals won the toss and elected to field.

Match 25
15 April 2022
19:30 (N)
Scorecard

Kolkata Knight Riders; 175/8 (20 overs)	v	Sunrisers Hyderabad; 176/3 (17.5 overs)
Nitish Rana 54 (36); T. Natarajan 3/37 (4 overs)		Rahul Tripathi 71 (37); Andre Russell 2/20 (2 overs)

Sunrisers Hyderabad won by 7 wickets
Brabourne Stadium, Mumbai
Umpires: Sadashiv Iyer (Ind) and Virender Sharma (Ind)
Player of the match: Rahul Tripathi (Sunrisers Hyderabad)

- Sunrisers Hyderabad won the toss and elected to field.

Match 26
16 April 2022
15:30 (D/N)
Scorecard

Lucknow Super Giants; 199/4 (20 overs)	v	Mumbai Indians; 181/9 (20 overs)
KL Rahul 103* (60); Jaydev Unadkat 2/32 (4 overs)		Suryakumar Yadav 37 (27); Avesh Khan 3/30 (4 overs)

Lucknow Super Giants won by 18 runs
Brabourne Stadium, Mumbai
Umpires: Anil Chaudhary (Ind) and Nikhil Patwardhan (Ind)
Player of the match: KL Rahul (Lucknow Super Giants)

- Mumbai Indians won the toss and elected to field.

Match 27
16 April 2022
19:30 (N)
Scorecard

Royal Challengers Bangalore; 189/5 (20 overs)	v	Delhi Capitals; 173/7 (20 overs)
Dinesh Karthik 66* (34); Shardul Thakur 1/27 (4 overs)		David Warner 66 (38); Josh Hazlewood 3/28 (4 overs)

Royal Challengers Bangalore won by 16 runs
Wankhede Stadium, Mumbai
Umpires: Jayaraman Madanagopal (Ind) and Chirra Ravikanthreddy (Ind)
Player of the match: Dinesh Karthik (Royal Challengers Bangalore)

- Delhi Capitals won the toss and elected to field.

Match 28
17 April 2022
15:30 (D/N)
Scorecard

Punjab Kings; 151 (20 overs)	v	Sunrisers Hyderabad; 152/3 (18.5 overs)
Liam Livingstone 60 (33); Umran Malik 4/28 (4 overs)		Aiden Markram 41* (27); Rahul Chahar 2/28 (4 overs)

Sunrisers Hyderabad won by 7 wickets
DY Patil Stadium, Navi Mumbai
Umpires: Rohan Pandit (Ind) and Pashchim Pathak (Ind)
Player of the match: Umran Malik (Sunrisers Hyderabad)

- Sunrisers Hyderabad won the toss and elected to field.

Match 29
17 April 2022
19:30 (N)
Scorecard

Chennai Super Kings; 169/5 (20 overs)	v	Gujarat Titans; 170/7 (19.5 overs)
Ruturaj Gaikwad 73 (48); Alzarri Joseph 2/34 (4 overs)		David Miller 94* (51); Dwayne Bravo 3/23 (4 overs)

Gujarat Titans won by 3 wickets
MCA International Stadium, Pune
Umpires: K. N. Ananthapadmanabhan (Ind) and Ulhas Gandhe (Ind)
Player of the match: David Miller (Gujarat Titans)

- Gujarat Titans won the toss and elected to field

Match 30
18 April 2022
19:30 (N)
Scorecard

Rajasthan Royals; 217/5 (20 overs)	v	Kolkata Knight Riders; 210 (19.4 overs)
Jos Buttler 103 (61); Sunil Narine 2/21 (4 overs)		Shreyas Iyer 85 (51); Yuzvendra Chahal 5/40 (4 overs)

Rajasthan Royals won by 7 runs
Brabourne Stadium, Mumbai
Umpires: Sadashiv Iyer (Ind) and Virender Sharma (Ind)
Player of the match: Yuzvendra Chahal (Rajasthan Royals)

- Kolkata Knight Riders won the toss and elected to field.
- Yuzvendra Chahal (Rajasthan Royals) took a hat-trick and a five-wicket haul.

Match 31
19 April 2022
19:30 (N)
Scorecard

Royal Challengers Bangalore; 181/6 (20 overs)	v	Lucknow Super Giants; 163/8 (20 overs)
Faf du Plessis 96 (64); Jason Holder 2/25 (4 overs)		Krunal Pandya 42 (28); Josh Hazlewood 4/25 (4 overs)

Royal Challengers Bangalore won by 18 runs
DY Patil Stadium, Navi Mumbai
Umpires: Chris Gaffaney (NZ) and Nitin Pandit (Ind)
Player of the match: Faf du Plessis (Royal Challengers Bangalore)

- Lucknow Super Giants won the toss and elected to field.

Match 32
20 April 2022
19:30 (N)
Scorecard

Punjab Kings; 115 (20 overs)	v	Delhi Capitals; 119/1 (10.3 overs)
Jitesh Sharma 32 (23); Axar Patel 2/10 (4 overs)		David Warner 60* (30); Rahul Chahar 1/21 (2.3 overs)

Delhi Capitals won by 9 wickets
Brabourne Stadium, Mumbai
Umpires: Tapan Sharma (Ind) and Rod Tucker (Aus)
Player of the match: Kuldeep Yadav (Delhi Capitals)

- Delhi Capitals won the toss and elected to field.

Match 33
21 April 2022
19:30 (N)
Scorecard

Mumbai Indians; 155/7 (20 overs)	v	Chennai Super Kings; 156/7 (20 overs)
Tilak Varma 51* (43); Mukesh Choudhary 3/19 (3 overs)		Ambati Rayudu 40 (35); Daniel Sams 4/30 (4 overs)

Chennai Super Kings won by 3 wickets
DY Patil Stadium, Navi Mumbai
Umpires: Ulhas Gandhe (Ind) and Bruce Oxenford (Aus)
Player of the match: Mukesh Choudhary (Chennai Super Kings)

- Chennai Super Kings won the toss and elected to field.
- Hrithik Shokeen (Mumbai Indians) made his T20 debut.

Match 34
22 April 2022
19:30 (N)
Scorecard

Rajasthan Royals; 222/2 (20 overs)	v	Delhi Capitals; 207/8 (20 overs)
Jos Buttler 116 (65); Mustafizur Rahman 1/43 (4 overs)		Rishabh Pant 44 (24); Prasidh Krishna 3/22 (4 overs)

Rajasthan Royals won by 15 runs
Wankhede Stadium, Mumbai
Umpires: Nitin Menon (Ind) and Nikhil Patwardhan (Ind)
Player of the match: Jos Buttler (Rajasthan Royals)

- Delhi Capitals won the toss and elected to field.
- Jos Buttler (Rajasthan Royals) became the second player to score consecutive hundreds in the IPL, after Shikhar Dhawan. Buttler also became the second player after Virat Kohli to score three or more centuries in a single IPL season.

Match 35
23 April 2022
15:30 (D/N)
Scorecard

Gujarat Titans; 156/9 (20 overs)	v	Kolkata Knight Riders; 148/8 (20 overs)
Hardik Pandya 67 (49); Andre Russell 4/5 (1 over)		Andre Russell 48 (25); Mohammed Shami 2/20 (4 overs)

Gujarat Titans won by 8 runs
DY Patil Stadium, Navi Mumbai
Umpires: K. N. Ananthapadmanabhan (Ind) and Ulhas Gandhe (Ind)
Player of the match: Rashid Khan (Gujarat Titans)

- Gujarat Titans won the toss and elected to bat.

Match 36
23 April 2022
19:30 (N)
Scorecard

Royal Challengers Bangalore; 68 (16.1 overs)	v	Sunrisers Hyderabad; 72/1 (8 overs)
Suyash Prabhudessai 15 (20); T. Natarajan 3/10 (3 overs)		Abhishek Sharma 47 (28); Harshal Patel 1/18 (2 overs)

Sunrisers Hyderabad won by 9 wickets
Brabourne Stadium, Mumbai
Umpires: Jayaraman Madanagopal (Ind) and Chirra Ravikanthreddy (Ind)
Player of the match: Marco Jansen (Sunrisers Hyderabad)

- Sunrisers Hyderabad won the toss and elected to field.

Match 37
24 April 2022
19:30 (N)
Scorecard

Lucknow Super Giants; 168/6 (20 overs)	v	Mumbai Indians; 132/8 (20 overs)
KL Rahul 103* (62); Kieron Pollard 2/8 (2 overs)		Rohit Sharma 39 (31); Krunal Pandya 3/19 (4 overs)

Lucknow Super Giants won by 36 runs
Wankhede Stadium, Mumbai
Umpires: Marais Erasmus (SA) and Saiyed Khalid (Ind)
Player of the match: KL Rahul (Lucknow Super Giants)

- Mumbai Indians won the toss and elected to field.

Match 38
25 April 2022
19:30 (N)
Scorecard

Punjab Kings; 187/4 (20 overs)	v	Chennai Super Kings; 176/6 (20 overs)
Shikhar Dhawan 88* (59); Dwayne Bravo 2/42 (4 overs)		Ambati Rayudu 78 (39); Kagiso Rabada 2/23 (4 overs)

Punjab Kings won by 11 runs
Wankhede Stadium, Mumbai
Umpires: Marais Erasmus (SA) and Tapan Sharma (Ind)
Player of the match: Shikhar Dhawan (Punjab Kings)

- Chennai Super Kings won the toss and elected to field.

Match 39
26 April 2022
19:30 (N)
Scorecard

Rajasthan Royals; 144/8 (20 overs)	v	Royal Challengers Bangalore; 115 (19.3 overs)
Riyan Parag 56* (31); Josh Hazlewood 2/19 (4 overs)		Faf du Plessis 23 (21); Kuldeep Sen 4/20 (3.3 overs)

Rajasthan Royals won by 29 runs
MCA International Stadium, Pune
Umpires: K. N. Ananthapadmanabhan (Ind) and Bruce Oxenford (Aus)
Player of the match: Riyan Parag (Rajasthan Royals)

- Royal Challengers Bangalore won the toss and elected to field.

Match 40
27 April 2022
19:30 (N)
Scorecard

Sunrisers Hyderabad; 195/6 (20 overs)	v	Gujarat Titans; 199/5 (20 overs)
Abhishek Sharma 65 (42); Mohammed Shami 3/39 (4 overs)		Wriddhiman Saha 68 (38); Umran Malik 5/25 (4 overs)

Gujarat Titans won by 5 wickets
Wankhede Stadium, Mumbai
Umpires: Chris Gaffaney (NZ) and Navdeep Singh (Ind)
Player of the match: Umran Malik (Sunrisers Hyderabad)

- Gujarat Titans won the toss and elected to field.
- Umran Malik (Sunrisers Hyderabad) took his first five-wicket haul.

Match 41
28 April 2022
19:30 (N)
Scorecard

Kolkata Knight Riders; 146/9 (20 overs)	v	Delhi Capitals; 150/6 (19 overs)
Nitish Rana 57 (34); Kuldeep Yadav 4/14 (3 overs)		David Warner 42 (26); Umesh Yadav 3/24 (4 overs)

Delhi Capitals won by 4 wickets
Wankhede Stadium, Mumbai
Umpires: Anil Chaudhary (Ind) and Pashchim Pathak (Ind)
Player of the match: Kuldeep Yadav (Delhi Capitals)

- Delhi Capitals won the toss and elected to field.
- Harshit Rana (Kolkata Knight Riders) made his T20 debut.

Match 42
29 April 2022
19:30 (N)
Scorecard

Lucknow Super Giants; 153/8 (20 overs)	v	Punjab Kings; 133/8 (20 overs)
Quinton de Kock 46 (37); Kagiso Rabada 4/38 (4 overs)		Jonny Bairstow 32 (28); Mohsin Khan 3/24 (4 overs)

Lucknow Super Giants won by 20 runs
MCA International Stadium, Pune
Umpires: Ulhas Gandhe (Ind) and Michael Gough (Eng)
Player of the match: Krunal Pandya (Lucknow Super Giants)

- Punjab Kings won the toss and elected to field.

Match 43
30 April 2022
15:30 (D/N)
Scorecard

Royal Challengers Bangalore; 170/6 (20 overs)	v	Gujarat Titans; 174/4 (19.3 overs)
Virat Kohli 58 (53); Pradeep Sangwan 2/19 (4 overs)		Rahul Tewatia 43* (25); Shahbaz Ahmed 2/26 (3 overs)

Gujarat Titans won by 6 wickets
Brabourne Stadium, Mumbai
Umpires: Saiyed Khalid (Ind) and Virender Sharma (Ind)
Player of the match: Rahul Tewatia (Gujarat Titans)

- Royal Challengers Bangalore won the toss and elected to bat.

Match 44
30 April 2022
19:30 (N)
Scorecard

Rajasthan Royals; 158/6 (20 overs)	v	Mumbai Indians; 161/5 (19.2 overs)
Jos Buttler 67 (52); Riley Meredith 2/24 (4 overs)		Suryakumar Yadav 51 (39); Ravichandran Ashwin 1/21 (4 overs)

Mumbai Indians won by 5 wickets
DY Patil Stadium, Navi Mumbai
Umpires: Yeshwant Barde (Ind) and Bruce Oxenford (Aus)
Player of the match: Suryakumar Yadav (Mumbai Indians)

- Mumbai Indians won the toss and elected to field.

Match 45
1 May 2022
15:30 (D/N)
Scorecard

Lucknow Super Giants; 195/3 (20 overs)	v	Delhi Capitals; 189/7 (20 overs)
KL Rahul 77 (51); Shardul Thakur 3/40 (4 overs)		Rishabh Pant 44 (30); Mohsin Khan 4/16 (4 overs)

Lucknow Super Giants won by 6 runs
Wankhede Stadium, Mumbai
Umpires: Chris Gaffaney (NZ) and Chirra Ravikanthreddy (Ind)
Player of the match: Mohsin Khan (Lucknow Super Giants)

- Lucknow Super Giants won the toss and elected to bat.

Match 46
1 May 2022
19:30 (N)
Scorecard

Chennai Super Kings; 202/2 (20 overs)	v	Sunrisers Hyderabad; 189/6 (20 overs)
Ruturaj Gaikwad 99 (57); T. Natarajan 2/42 (4 overs)		Nicholas Pooran 64* (33); Mukesh Choudhary 4/46 (4 overs)

Chennai Super Kings won by 13 runs
MCA International Stadium, Pune
Umpires: K. N. Ananthapadmanabhan (Ind) and Anil Chaudhary (Ind)
Player of the match: Ruturaj Gaikwad (Chennai Super Kings)

- Sunrisers Hyderabad won the toss and elected to field.

Match 47
2 May 2022
19:30 (N)
Scorecard

Rajasthan Royals; 152/5 (20 overs)	v	Kolkata Knight Riders; 158/3 (19.1 overs)
Sanju Samson 54 (49); Tim Southee 2/46 (4 overs)		Nitish Rana 48* (37); Trent Boult 1/25 (4 overs)

Kolkata Knight Riders won by 7 wickets
Wankhede Stadium, Mumbai
Umpires: Jayaraman Madanagopal (Ind) and Nitin Pandit (Ind)
Player of the match: Rinku Singh (Kolkata Knight Riders)

- Kolkata Knight Riders won the toss and elected to field.

Match 48
3 May 2022
19:30 (N)
Scorecard

Gujarat Titans; 143/8 (20 overs)	v	Punjab Kings; 145/2 (16 overs)
Sai Sudharsan 65* (50); Kagiso Rabada 4/33 (4 overs)		Shikhar Dhawan 62* (53); Lockie Ferguson 1/29 (3 overs)

Punjab Kings won by 8 wickets
DY Patil Stadium, Navi Mumbai
Umpires: Rohan Pandit (Ind) and Virender Sharma (Ind)
Player of the match: Kagiso Rabada (Punjab Kings)

- Gujarat Titans won the toss and elected to bat.

Match 49
4 May 2022
19:30 (N)
Scorecard

Royal Challengers Bangalore; 173/8 (20 overs)	v	Chennai Super Kings; 160/8 (20 overs)
Mahipal Lomror 42 (27); Maheesh Theekshana 3/27 (4 overs)		Devon Conway 56 (37); Harshal Patel 3/35 (4 overs)

Royal Challengers Bangalore won by 13 runs
MCA International Stadium, Pune
Umpires: K. N. Ananthapadmanabhan (Ind) and Michael Gough (Eng)
Player of the match: Harshal Patel (Royal Challengers Bangalore)

- Chennai Super Kings won the toss and elected to field.

Match 50
5 May 2022
19:30 (N)
Scorecard

Delhi Capitals; 207/3 (20 overs)	v	Sunrisers Hyderabad; 186/8 (20 overs)
David Warner 92* (58); Bhuvneshwar Kumar 1/25 (4 overs)		Nicholas Pooran 62 (34); Khaleel Ahmed 3/30 (4 overs)

Delhi Capitals won by 21 runs
Brabourne Stadium, Mumbai
Umpires: Nikhil Patwardhan (Ind) and Navdeep Singh (Ind)
Player of the match: David Warner (Delhi Capitals)

- Sunrisers Hyderabad won the toss and elected to field.

Match 51
6 May 2022
19:30 (N)
Scorecard

Mumbai Indians; 177/6 (20 overs)	v	Gujarat Titans; 172/5 (20 overs)
Ishan Kishan 45 (29); Rashid Khan 2/24 (4 overs)		Wriddhiman Saha 55 (40); Murugan Ashwin 2/29 (4 overs)

Mumbai Indians won by 5 runs
Brabourne Stadium, Mumbai
Umpires: Sadashiv Iyer (Ind) and Jayaraman Madanagopal (Ind)
Player of the match: Tim David (Mumbai Indians)

- Gujarat Titans won the toss and elected to field.

Match 52
7 May 2022
15:30 (D/N)
Scorecard

Punjab Kings; 189/5 (20 overs)	v	Rajasthan Royals; 190/4 (19.4 overs)
Jonny Bairstow 56 (40); Yuzvendra Chahal 3/28 (4 overs)		Yashasvi Jaiswal 68 (41); Arshdeep Singh 2/29 (4 overs)

Rajasthan Royals won by 6 wickets
Wankhede Stadium, Mumbai
Umpires: Yeshwant Barde (Ind) and Chirra Ravikanthreddy (Ind)
Player of the match: Yashasvi Jaiswal (Rajasthan Royals)

- Punjab Kings won the toss and elected to bat.
- Mumbai Indians were eliminated as a result of this match.

Match 53
7 May 2022
19:30 (N)
Scorecard

Lucknow Super Giants; 176/7 (20 overs)	v	Kolkata Knight Riders; 101 (14.3 overs)
Quinton de Kock 50 (29); Andre Russell 2/22 (3 overs)		Andre Russell 45 (19); Avesh Khan 3/19 (3 overs)

Lucknow Super Giants won by 75 runs
MCA International Stadium, Pune
Umpires: Anil Chaudhary (Ind) and Michael Gough (Eng)
Player of the match: Avesh Khan (Lucknow Super Giants)

- Kolkata Knight Riders won the toss and elected to field.

Match 54
8 May 2022
15:30 (D/N)
Scorecard

Royal Challengers Bangalore; 192/3 (20 overs)	v	Sunrisers Hyderabad; 125 (19.2 overs)
Faf du Plessis 73* (50); Jagadeesha Suchith 2/30 (4 overs)		Rahul Tripathi 58 (37); Wanindu Hasaranga 5/18 (4 overs)

Royal Challengers Bangalore won by 67 runs
Wankhede Stadium, Mumbai
Umpires: Bruce Oxenford (Aus) and Nitin Pandit (Ind)
Player of the match: Wanindu Hasaranga (Royal Challengers Bangalore)

- Royal Challengers Bangalore won the toss and elected to bat.

Match 55
8 May 2022
19:30 (N)
Scorecard

Chennai Super Kings; 208/6 (20 overs)	v	Delhi Capitals; 117 (17.4 overs)
Devon Conway 87 (49); Anrich Nortje 3/42 (4 overs)		Mitchell Marsh 25 (20); Moeen Ali 3/13 (4 overs)

Chennai Super Kings won by 91 runs
DY Patil Stadium, Navi Mumbai
Umpires: Nitin Menon (Ind) and Rohan Pandit (Ind)
Player of the match: Devon Conway (Chennai Super Kings)

- Delhi Capitals won the toss and elected to field.

Match 56
9 May 2022
19:30 (N)
Scorecard

Kolkata Knight Riders; 165/9 (20 overs)	v	Mumbai Indians; 113 (17.3 overs)
Venkatesh Iyer 43 (24); Jasprit Bumrah 5/10 (4 overs)		Ishan Kishan 51 (43); Pat Cummins 3/22 (4 overs)

Kolkata Knight Riders won by 52 runs
DY Patil Stadium, Navi Mumbai
Umpires: Chris Gaffaney (NZ) and Sadashiv Iyer (Ind)
Player of the match: Jasprit Bumrah (Mumbai Indians)

- Mumbai Indians won the toss and elected to field.

Match 57
10 May 2022
19:30 (N)
Scorecard

Gujarat Titans; 144/4 (20 overs)	v	Lucknow Super Giants; 82 (13.5 overs)
Shubman Gill 63* (49); Avesh Khan 2/26 (4 overs)		Deepak Hooda 27 (26); Rashid Khan 4/24 (3.5 overs)

Gujarat Titans won by 62 runs
MCA International Stadium, Pune
Umpires: K. N. Ananthapadmanabhan (Ind) and Michael Gough (Eng)
Player of the match: Shubman Gill (Gujarat Titans)

- Gujarat Titans won the toss and elected to bat.
- Gujarat Titans qualified for the playoffs as a result of this match.

Match 58
11 May 2022
19:30 (N)
Scorecard

Rajasthan Royals; 160/6 (20 overs)	v	Delhi Capitals; 161/2 (18.1 overs)
Ravichandran Ashwin 50 (38); Chetan Sakariya 2/23 (4 overs)		Mitchell Marsh 89 (62); Trent Boult 1/32 (4 overs)

Delhi Capitals won by 8 wickets
DY Patil Stadium, Navi Mumbai
Umpires: Nitin Menon (Ind) and Nikhil Patwardhan (Ind)
Player of the match: Mitchell Marsh (Delhi Capitals)

- Delhi Capitals won the toss and elected to field.

Match 59
12 May 2022
19:30 (N)
Scorecard

Chennai Super Kings; 97 (16 overs)	v	Mumbai Indians; 103/5 (14.5 overs)
MS Dhoni 36* (33); Daniel Sams 3/16 (4 overs)		Tilak Varma 34* (32); Mukesh Choudhary 3/23 (4 overs)

Mumbai Indians won by 5 wickets
Wankhede Stadium, Mumbai
Umpires: Chris Gaffaney (NZ) and Chirra Ravikanthreddy (Ind)
Player of the match: Daniel Sams (Mumbai Indians)

- Mumbai Indians won the toss and elected to field.
- Chennai Super Kings were eliminated as a result of this match.

Match 60
13 May 2022
19:30 (N)
Scorecard

Punjab Kings; 209/9 (20 overs)	v	Royal Challengers Bangalore; 155/9 (20 overs)
Liam Livingstone 70 (42); Harshal Patel 4/34 (4 overs)		Glenn Maxwell 35 (22); Kagiso Rabada 3/21 (4 overs)

Punjab Kings won by 54 runs
Brabourne Stadium, Mumbai
Umpires: Jayaraman Madanagopal (Ind) and Nitin Pandit (Ind)
Player of the match: Jonny Bairstow (Punjab Kings)

- Royal Challengers Bangalore won the toss and elected to field.

Match 61
14 May 2022
19:30 (N)
Scorecard

Kolkata Knight Riders; 177/6 (20 overs)	v	Sunrisers Hyderabad; 123/8 (20 overs)
Andre Russell 49* (28); Umran Malik 3/33 (4 overs)		Abhishek Sharma 43 (28); Andre Russell 3/22 (4 overs)

Kolkata Knight Riders won by 54 runs
MCA International Stadium, Pune
Umpires: K. N. Ananthapadmanabhan (Ind) and Anil Chaudhary (Ind)
Player of the match: Andre Russell (Kolkata Knight Riders)

- Kolkata Knight Riders won the toss and elected to bat.

Match 62
15 May 2022
15:30 (D/N)
Scorecard

Chennai Super Kings; 133/5 (20 overs)	v	Gujarat Titans; 137/3 (19.1 overs)
Ruturaj Gaikwad 53 (49); Mohammed Shami 2/19 (4 overs)		Wriddhiman Saha 67* (57); Matheesha Pathirana 2/24 (3.1 overs)

Gujarat Titans won by 7 wickets
Wankhede Stadium, Mumbai
Umpires: Rohan Pandit (Ind) and Virender Sharma (Ind)
Player of the match: Wriddhiman Saha (Gujarat Titans)

- Chennai Super Kings won the toss and elected to bat.
- Gujarat Titans advanced to Qualifier 1 as a result of this match.

Match 63
15 May 2022
19:30 (N)
Scorecard

Rajasthan Royals; 178/6 (20 overs)	v	Lucknow Super Giants; 154/8 (20 overs)
Yashasvi Jaiswal 41 (29); Ravi Bishnoi 2/31 (4 overs)		Deepak Hooda 59 (39); Trent Boult 2/18 (4 overs)

Rajasthan Royals won by 24 runs
Brabourne Stadium, Mumbai
Umpires: Pashchim Pathak (Ind) and Tapan Sharma (Ind)
Player of the match: Trent Boult (Rajasthan Royals)

- Rajasthan Royals won the toss and elected to bat.

Match 64
16 May 2022
19:30 (N)
Scorecard

Delhi Capitals; 159/7 (20 overs)	v	Punjab Kings; 142/9 (20 overs)
Mitchell Marsh 63 (48); Liam Livingstone 3/27 (4 overs)		Jitesh Sharma 44 (34); Shardul Thakur 4/36 (4 overs)

Delhi Capitals won by 17 runs
DY Patil Stadium, Navi Mumbai
Umpires: Sadashiv Iyer (Ind) and Nitin Menon (Ind)
Player of the match: Shardul Thakur (Delhi Capitals)

- Punjab Kings won the toss and elected to field.

Match 65
17 May 2022
19:30 (N)
Scorecard

Sunrisers Hyderabad; 193/6 (20 overs)	v	Mumbai Indians; 190/7 (20 overs)
Rahul Tripathi 76 (44); Ramandeep Singh 3/20 (3 overs)		Rohit Sharma 48 (36); Umran Malik 3/23 (3 overs)

Sunrisers Hyderabad won by 3 runs
Wankhede Stadium, Mumbai
Umpires: Chris Gaffaney (NZ) and Nitin Pandit (Ind)
Player of the match: Rahul Tripathi (Sunrisers Hyderabad)

- Mumbai Indians won the toss and elected to field.

Match 66
18 May 2022
19:30 (N)
Scorecard

Lucknow Super Giants; 210/0 (20 overs)	v	Kolkata Knight Riders; 208/8 (20 overs)
Quinton de Kock 140* (70)		Shreyas Iyer 50 (29); Mohsin Khan 3/20 (4 overs)

Lucknow Super Giants won by 2 runs
DY Patil Stadium, Navi Mumbai
Umpires: Yeshwant Barde (Ind) and Rohan Pandit (Ind)
Player of the match: Quinton de Kock (Lucknow Super Giants)

- Lucknow Super Giants won the toss and elected to bat.
- Lucknow Super Giants qualified for the playoffs and Kolkata Knight Riders were eliminated as a result of this match.
- Quinton de Kock and KL Rahul (Lucknow Super Giants) scored the highest opening partnership in the IPL.

Match 67
19 May 2022
19:30 (N)
Scorecard

Gujarat Titans; 168/5 (20 overs)	v	Royal Challengers Bangalore; 170/2 (18.4 overs)
Hardik Pandya 62* (47); Josh Hazlewood 2/39 (4 overs)		Virat Kohli 73 (54); Rashid Khan 2/32 (4 overs)

Royal Challengers Bangalore won by 8 wickets
Wankhede Stadium, Mumbai
Umpires: K. N. Ananthapadmanabhan (Ind) and Sadashiv Iyer (Ind)
Player of the match: Virat Kohli (Royal Challengers Bangalore)

- Gujarat Titans won the toss and elected to bat.
- Punjab Kings and Sunrisers Hyderabad were eliminated as a result of the match.

Match 68
20 May 2022
19:30 (N)
Scorecard

Chennai Super Kings; 150/6 (20 overs)	v	Rajasthan Royals; 151/5 (19.4 overs)
Moeen Ali 93 (57); Obed McCoy 2/20 (4 overs)		Yashasvi Jaiswal 59 (44); Prashant Solanki 2/20 (2 overs)

Rajasthan Royals won by 5 wickets
Brabourne Stadium, Mumbai
Umpires: Chris Gaffaney (NZ) and Nikhil Patwardhan (Ind)
Player of the match: Ravichandran Ashwin (Rajasthan Royals)

- Chennai Super Kings won the toss and elected to bat.
- Rajasthan Royals qualified for the playoffs (Qualifier 1) as a result of this match.

Match 69
21 May 2022
19:30 (N)
Scorecard

Delhi Capitals; 159/7 (20 overs)	v	Mumbai Indians; 160/5 (19.1 overs)
Rovman Powell 43 (34); Jasprit Bumrah 3/25 (4 overs)		Ishan Kishan 48 (35); Shardul Thakur 2/32 (3 overs)

Mumbai Indians won by 5 wickets
Wankhede Stadium, Mumbai
Umpires: Nitin Menon (Ind) and Tapan Sharma (Ind)
Player of the match: Jasprit Bumrah (Mumbai Indians)

- Mumbai Indians won the toss and elected to field.
- Royal Challengers Bangalore qualified for the playoffs and Delhi Capitals were eliminated as a result of this match.

Match 70
22 May 2022
19:30 (N)
Scorecard

Sunrisers Hyderabad; 157/8 (20 overs)	v	Punjab Kings; 160/5 (15.1 overs)
Abhishek Sharma 43 (32); Harpreet Brar 3/26 (4 overs)		Liam Livingstone 49* (22); Fazalhaq Farooqi 2/32 (4 overs)

Punjab Kings won by 5 wickets
Wankhede Stadium, Mumbai
Umpires: Anil Chaudhary (Ind) and Nikhil Patwardhan (Ind)
Player of the match: Harpreet Brar (Punjab Kings)

- Sunrisers Hyderabad won the toss and elected to bat.

== Playoffs ==
The final took place on 29 May 2022. The full schedule for the playoffs was announced on 23 April 2022.

Qualifier 1 / Eliminator
24 May 2022 - Kolkata
1	Gujarat Titans	191/3 (19.3 overs)
2	Rajasthan Royals	188/6 (20 overs)
25 May 2022 - Kolkata
3	Lucknow Super Giants	193/6 (20 overs)
4	Royal Challengers Bangalore	207/4 (20 overs)

Qualifier 2
27 May 2022 — Ahmedabad
Q1L	Rajasthan Royals	161/3 (18.1 overs)
EW	Royal Challengers Bangalore	157/8 (20 overs)

Final
29 May 2022 — Ahmedabad
Q1W	Gujarat Titans	133/3 (18.1 overs)
Q2W	Rajasthan Royals	130/9 (20 overs)

=== Qualifier 1 ===
24 May 2022
19:30 (N)
Scorecard

Rajasthan Royals; 188/6 (20 overs)	v	Gujarat Titans; 191/3 (19.3 overs)
Jos Buttler 89 (56); Hardik Pandya 1/14 (2 overs)		David Miller 68* (38); Trent Boult 1/38 (4 overs)

Gujarat Titans won by 7 wickets
Eden Gardens, Kolkata
Umpires: Bruce Oxenford (Aus) and Virender Sharma (Ind)
Player of the match: David Miller (Gujarat Titans)

- Gujarat Titans won the toss and elected to field.

=== Eliminator ===
25 May 2022
19:30 (N)
Scorecard

Royal Challengers Bangalore; 207/4 (20 overs)	v	Lucknow Super Giants; 193/6 (20 overs)
Rajat Patidar 112* (54); Mohsin Khan 1/25 (4 overs)		KL Rahul 79 (58); Josh Hazlewood 3/43 (4 overs)

Royal Challengers Bangalore won by 14 runs
Eden Gardens, Kolkata
Umpires: Michael Gough (Eng) and Jayaraman Madanagopal (Ind)
Player of the match: Rajat Patidar (Royal Challengers Bangalore)

- Lucknow Super Giants won the toss and elected to field.

=== Qualifier 2 ===
27 May 2022
19:30 (N)
Scorecard

Royal Challengers Bangalore; 157/8 (20 overs)	v	Rajasthan Royals; 161/3 (18.1 overs)
Rajat Patidar 58 (42); Prasidh Krishna 3/22 (4 overs)		Jos Buttler 106* (60); Josh Hazlewood 2/23 (4 overs)

Rajasthan Royals won by 7 wickets
Narendra Modi Stadium, Ahmedabad
Umpires: Chris Gaffaney (NZ) and Nitin Menon (Ind)
Player of the match: Jos Buttler (Rajasthan Royals)

- Rajasthan Royals won the toss and elected to field.

=== Final ===
29 May 2022
20:00 (N)
Scorecard

Rajasthan Royals; 130/9 (20 overs)	v	Gujarat Titans; 133/3 (18.1 overs)
Jos Buttler 39 (35); Hardik Pandya 3/17 (4 overs)		Shubman Gill 45* (43); Trent Boult 1/14 (4 overs)

Gujarat Titans won by 7 wickets
Narendra Modi Stadium, Ahmedabad
Umpires: Chris Gaffaney (NZ) and Nitin Menon (Ind)
Player of the match: Hardik Pandya (Gujarat Titans)

- Rajasthan Royals won the toss and elected to bat.
- This match got the Guinness Book of World Records for having the highest recorded match attendance at 101,566 spectators.

== Statistics and awards ==
=== Most runs ===
Player	Team	Mat	Inns	Runs	High score
Jos Buttler	Rajasthan Royals	17	17	863	116
KL Rahul	Lucknow Super Giants	15	15	616	103*
Quinton de Kock	Lucknow Super Giants	15	15	508	140*
Hardik Pandya	Gujarat Titans	15	15	487	87*
Shubman Gill	Gujarat Titans	16	16	483	96
Source: IPLT20.com

- Orange Cap

=== Most wickets ===
Player	Team	Mat	Inns	Wkts	BBI
Yuzvendra Chahal	Rajasthan Royals	17	17	27	5/40
Wanindu Hasaranga	Royal Challengers Bangalore	16	16	26	5/18
Kagiso Rabada	Punjab Kings	13	13	23	4/33
Umran Malik	Sunrisers Hyderabad	14	14	22	5/25
Kuldeep Yadav	Delhi Capitals	14	14	21	4/14
Source: IPLT20.com

- Purple Cap

=== End of the season awards ===
Player	Team	Award	Prize
Umran Malik	Sunrisers Hyderabad	Emerging player of the season	₹10 lakh (US$10,000)
	Gujarat Titans and Rajasthan Royals	Fairplay award	Team trophy
Evin Lewis	Lucknow Super Giants	Catch of the season	₹10 lakh (US$10,000) and trophy
Lockie Ferguson	Gujarat Titans	Fastest delivery of the season	₹10 lakh (US$10,000) and trophy
Jos Buttler	Rajasthan Royals	Gamechanger of the season	₹10 lakh (US$10,000) and trophy
Dinesh Karthik	Royal Challengers Bangalore	Super striker of the season	₹10 lakh (US$10,000), trophy and a car
Jos Buttler	Rajasthan Royals	Most sixes	₹10 lakh (US$10,000) and trophy
Jos Buttler	Rajasthan Royals	Most fours	₹10 lakh (US$10,000) and trophy
Jos Buttler	Rajasthan Royals	Player of the season	₹10 lakh (US$10,000) and trophy
Yuzvendra Chahal	Rajasthan Royals	Purple cap (most wickets)	₹10 lakh (US$10,000)
Jos Buttler	Rajasthan Royals	Orange cap (most runs)	₹10 lakh (US$10,000)
