= Kishan Parmar =

Indian cricketer (born 1992)

Personal information
- Born: 9 April 1992 (age 34)
- Batting: Right-handed
- Bowling: Right arm Medium

Domestic team information
- Years: Team
- 2016-17: Saurashtra
- Source: ESPNcricinfo, 29 November 2016

Kishan Parmar (born 9 April 1992) is an Indian first-class cricketer who plays for Saurashtra. He made his first-class debut for Saurashtra in the 2016-17 Ranji Trophy on 29 November 2016. He made his Twenty20 debut for Saurashtra in the 2016–17 Inter State Twenty-20 Tournament on 30 January 2017.
