= Shrikant Wagh =

Indian cricketer (born 1988)

Personal information
- Born: 9 October 1988 (age 38); Chikhli, Maharashtra
- Batting: Left-handed
- Bowling: Left-arm fast-medium
- Role: Bowler

Domestic team information
- Years: Team
- 2006-2020: Vidarbha
- 2009: Rajasthan Royals
- 2011: Pune Warriors India
- 2021-2022: Goa

Career statistics
Competition	First-class	List A	T20
Matches	67	54	63
Runs scored	1,722	451	272
Batting average	23.27	16.70	14.31
100s/50s	1/5	0/0	0/0
Top score	110*	44*	27*
Balls bowled	11,181	2,469	1,211
Wickets	166	68	77
Bowling average	31.28	29.88	18.90
5 wickets in innings	4	2	0
10 wickets in match	0	0	0
Best bowling	5/23	6/42	4/26
Catches/stumpings	14/-	12/-	15/-
- Source: ESPNcricinfo, 14 August 2026

Shrikant Bhaskar Wagh (born 9 October 1988) is an Indian cricketer who played for Pune Warriors India in the 2011 Indian Premier League.

He is alum of Leeds Beckett University, who studied MSC sports business management. He has over 16 years of professional cricket career, including playing in Indian Premier League, his passion for sports development led him to United Kingdom. Currently, he is working as Head of Cricket at Queen Ethelburga's Collegiate in York.
