= Naushad Shaikh =

Indian cricketer (born 1991)

Personal information
- Full name: Naushad Shafi Shaikh
- Born: 15 October 1991 (age 35); Osmanabad, Maharashtra, India

Career statistics
Competition	FC	LA	T20
Matches	26	36	41
Runs scored	1,453	1,072	898
Batting average	33.79	34.58	29.93
100s/50s	4/5	0/9	0/5
Top score	143	76*	78*
Balls bowled	109	176	227
Wickets	1	1	12
Bowling average	71.00	166.00	15.58
5 wickets in innings	0	0	0
10 wickets in match	0	0	0
Best bowling	1/46	1/21	3/9
Catches/stumpings	27/–	18/–	27/1
- Source: ESPNcricinfo, 17 February 2022

Naushad Shafi Shaikh (born 15 October 1991) is an Indian cricketer who has played in more than 100 matches across all three formats since he made his debut in 2015. He made his first-class debut for Maharashtra in the 2016–17 Ranji Trophy on 13 October 2016. He made his Twenty20 debut for Maharashtra in the 2016–17 Inter State Twenty-20 Tournament on 29 January 2017. Ahead of the 2019–20 Ranji Trophy, Shaikh was appointed as the captain of the Maharashtra team for the tournament.
