= Chirra Ravikanthreddy =

Indian cricket umpire (born 1981)

Personal information
- Full name: Chirra Ravikanthreddy
- Born: 11 July 1981 (age 45); Visakhapatnam, Andhra Pradesh, India
- Role: Umpire

Umpiring information
- WT20Is umpired: 3 (2019)
- Source: ESPNcricinfo, 5 March 2023

Chirra Ravikanthreddy (born 11 July 1981) is an BCCI Indian cricket umpire. He has stood in matches in the Ranji Trophy tournament, the Indian Premier League and WPL.
