= 2019–20 Ranji Trophy Group B =

Cricket tournament

- The Ranji Trophy, awarded to the winners
- Dates: 9 December 2019 – 15 February 2020
- Administrator: BCCI
- Cricket format: First-class cricket
- Tournament format: Round-robin
- Host: India
- Participants: 9

The 2019–20 Ranji Trophy was the 86th season of the Ranji Trophy, the first-class cricket tournament that took place in India. It was contested by 38 teams, divided into four groups, with nine teams in Group B. The group stage ran from 9 December 2019 to 15 February 2020. The top five teams across Group A and Group B progressed to the quarter-finals of the competition.

In the round seven match between Madhya Pradesh and Uttar Pradesh, Madhya Pradesh's Ravi Yadav became the first bowler to take a hat-trick in his first over on his debut in a first-class cricket match.

Ahead of the final round of group stage matches, Saurashtra had qualified for the quarter-finals from Group B. Karnataka also progressed from Group B, after they beat Baroda by eight wickets in their final match.

== Points table ==
Pos	Team	Pld	W	L	D	T	NR	Pts	Quot
3	Karnataka	8	4	0	4	0	0	31	1.042
4	Saurashtra	8	3	1	4	0	0	31	1.239
9	Tamil Nadu	8	2	2	4	0	0	20	1.146
10	Uttar Pradesh	8	2	1	5	0	0	20	1.093
11	Himachal Pradesh	8	2	1	5	0	0	19	0.987
13	Mumbai	8	1	2	5	0	0	17	1.195
14	Railways	8	1	4	3	0	0	16	0.864
15	Baroda	8	2	4	2	0	0	14	0.670
16	Madhya Pradesh	8	0	2	6	0	0	12	0.888

- Top five teams across Groups A and B advance to the knockout stage.
- Bottom two teams across Groups A and B relegated to the Elite Group C for the next season.

== Fixtures ==
=== Round 1 ===
9–12 December 2019
Scorecard

Mumbai	v	Baroda
431 (106.4 overs); Shams Mulani 89 (141); Yusuf Pathan 3/26 (10.4 overs)		307 (70.1 overs); Kedar Devdhar 160* (190); Shams Mulani 6/99 (27.1 overs)
409/4d (66.2 overs); Prithvi Shaw 202 (179); Soyeb Sopariya 2/35 (8 overs)		224 (52.4 overs); Deepak Hooda 61 (98); Shams Mulani 4/72 (16.4 overs)

Mumbai won by 309 runs
Reliance Stadium, Vadodara
Umpires: Rajeev Godara and Vinod Sharma
Player of the match: Shams Mulani (Mumbai)

- Mumbai won the toss and elected to bat.
- Abhimanyusingh Rajput, Soyeb Sopariya (Baroda) and Shashank Attarde (Mumbai) all made their first-class debuts.
- Shams Mulani (Mumbai) took his first five-wicket haul in first-class cricket.
- Prithvi Shaw (Mumbai) scored the third-fastest double century in the Ranji Trophy, from 174 balls.

9–12 December 2019
Scorecard

Himachal Pradesh	v	Saurashtra
120 (42.3 overs); Prashant Chopra 33 (58); Prerak Mankad 3/13 (9 overs)		141 (36.2 overs); Dharmendrasinh Jadeja 47 (42); Vaibhav Arora 6/48 (15.2 overs)
182 (38.3 overs); Ankush Bains 74 (56); Jaydev Unadkat 6/51 (15.3 overs)		165/5 (45.5 overs); Prerak Mankad 47* (78); Vaibhav Arora 3/57 (16 overs)

Saurashtra won by 5 wickets
Himachal Pradesh Cricket Association Stadium, Dharamsala
Umpires: Ulhas Gandhe and Yeshwant Barde

- Himachal Pradesh won the toss and elected to bat.
- Vaibhav Arora (Himachal Pradesh) made his first-class debut.

9–12 December 2019
Scorecard

Karnataka	v	Tamil Nadu
336 (110.4 overs); Devdutt Padikkal 78 (182); Ravichandran Ashwin 4/79 (33.4 overs)		307 (109.3 overs); Dinesh Karthik 113 (235); Krishnappa Gowtham 6/110 (40.3 overs)
151 (65.4 overs); Devdutt Padikkal 39 (134); Ravichandran Ashwin 4/46 (27 overs)		154 (63.3 overs); Abhinav Mukund 42(76); Krishnappa Gowtham 8/60 (30.3 overs)

Karnataka won by 26 runs
NPR College Ground, Dindigul
Umpires: Nitin Pandit and Anil Dandekar
Player of the match: Krishnappa Gowtham (Karnataka)

- Karnataka won the toss and elected to bat.
- Manimaran Siddharth (Tamil Nadu) and Vasuki Koushik (Karnataka) both made their first-class debuts.

9–12 December 2019
Scorecard

Railways	v	Uttar Pradesh
253 (85.3 overs); Dinesh Mor 91 (131); Yash Dayal 5/48 (20.3 overs)		175 (53.1 overs); Almas Shaukat 92* (161); Amit Mishra 4/52 (21 overs)
270 (76.5 overs); Dinesh Mor 102 (174); Shivam Mavi 4/19 (8 overs)		62/2 (21 overs); Almas Shaukat 33 (51); T Pradeep 1/15 (3 overs)

Match drawn
Victoria Park Stadium, Meerut
Umpires: Vineet Kulkarni and Sundaram Ravi
Player of the match: Dinesh Mor (Railways)

- Uttar Pradesh won the toss and elected to field.
- Aryan Juyal (Uttar Pradesh), Navneet Virk, Himanshu Sangwan, T Pradeep and Dinesh Mor (Railways) all made their first-class debuts.

=== Round 2 ===
17–20 December 2019
Scorecard

Himachal Pradesh	v	Tamil Nadu
158 (71.4 overs); Akash Vashist 35 (94); Ravichandran Ashwin 5/65 (29 overs)		96 (39 overs); Ravichandran Ashwin 24 (60); Vaibhav Arora 3/21 (11 overs)
154 (52.2 overs); Sumeet Verma 36 (65); Ravichandran Ashwin 4/55 (19.2 overs)		145 (67.5 overs); Karunakaran Mukunth 48 (146); Akash Vashist 7/33 (19.5 overs)

Himachal Pradesh won by 71 runs
NPR College Ground, Dindigul
Umpires: Vineet Kulkarni and Sunil Singh
Player of the match: Akash Vashist (Himachal Pradesh)

- Tamil Nadu won the toss and elected to field.
- Karunakaran Mukunth (Tamil Nadu) and Akash Vashist (Himachal Pradesh) both made their first-class debuts.

17–20 December 2019
Scorecard

Uttar Pradesh	v	Karnataka
281 (111.2 overs); Aryan Juyal 109 (251); Abhimanyu Mithun 6/60 (25 overs)		321 (135.5 overs); Devdutt Padikkal 74 (108); Saurabh Kumar 6/116 (57)
204/3d (69.1 overs); Almas Shaukat 103* (210); David Mathias 1/27 (10 overs)

Match drawn
KSCA Rajnagar Stadium, Hubballi
Umpires: Tapan Sharma and Virender Sharma
Player of the match: Abhimanyu Mithun (Karnataka)

- Uttar Pradesh won the toss and elected to bat.
- Mohit Jangra and Shubham Mavi (Uttar Pradesh) both made their first-class debuts.

17–20 December 2019
Scorecard

Madhya Pradesh	v	Baroda
125 (43.1 overs); Yash Dubey 48 (73); Anureet Singh 3/24 (13.1 overs)		222 (55.1 overs); Yusuf Pathan 76* (86); Mihir Hirwani 4/21 (8.1 overs)
270 (99.1 overs); Ajay Rohera 64 (144); Lukman Meriwala 3/59 (21.1 overs)		174/9 (53.3 overs); Kedar Devdhar 48 (57); Avesh Khan 4/54 (21 overs)

Baroda won by 1 wicket
Holkar Cricket Stadium, Indore
Umpires: Ulhas Gandhe and Yeshwant Barde
Player of the match: Krunal Pandya (Baroda)

- Baroda won the toss and elected to field.
- Himanshu Mantri (Madhya Pradesh) made his first-class debut.

17–20 December 2019
Scorecard

Railways	v	Saurashtra
248 (92 overs); Pratham Singh 98 (195); Jaydev Unadkat 4/56 (20 overs)		479/9d (136 overs); Arpit Vasavada 134* (201); Karn Sharma 4/105 (26 overs)
141 (54.4 overs); Avinash Yadav 38 (62); Jaydev Unadkat 6/23 (14 overs)

Saurashtra won by an innings and 90 runs
Waltair Railway Cricket Stadium, Visakhapatnam
Umpires: Nitin Pandit and Anil Dandekar
Player of the match: Jaydev Unadkat (Saurashtra)

- Saurashtra won the toss and elected to field.

=== Round 3 ===
25–28 December 2019
Scorecard

Karnataka	v	Himachal Pradesh
166 (67.2 overs); Karun Nair 81 (185); Kanwar Abhinay 5/37 (15 overs)		280 (107.4 overs); Rishi Dhawan 93 (141); Vasuki Koushik 4/59 (24.4 overs)
296 (108.3 overs); Devdutt Padikkal 99 (201); Rishi Dhawan 5/83 (28 overs)		34/2 (16 overs); Prashant Chopra 12* (46); Vasuki Koushik 2/13 (7 overs)

Match drawn
Srikantadatta Narasimha Raja Wadeyar Ground, Mysore
Umpires: Nitin Menon and Yeshwant Barde
Player of the match: Rishi Dhawan (Himachal Pradesh)

- Karnataka won the toss and elected to bat.

25–28 December 2019
Scorecard

Tamil Nadu	v	Madhya Pradesh
149 (59 overs); Baba Aparajith 61* (106); Ishwar Pandey 6/26 (20 overs)		333 (97.3 overs); Venkatesh Iyer 88 (125); T. Natarajan 5/106 (32.3 overs)
377/7 (131.4 overs); Kaushik Gandhi 154 (340); Kuldeep Sen 2/59 (25 overs)

Match drawn
Holkar Cricket Stadium, Indore
Umpires: Ulhas Gandhe and Virender Sharma
Player of the match: Ishwar Pandey (Madhya Pradesh)

- Madhya Pradesh won the toss and elected to field.
- Chezhian Harinishanth (Tamil Nadu) made his first-class debut.

25–28 December 2019
Scorecard

Mumbai	v	Railways
114 (28.3 overs); Suryakumar Yadav 39 (40); T Pradeep 6/37 (10.3 overs)		266 (74.1 overs); Karn Sharma 112* (146); Tushar Deshpande 4/44 (15.1 overs)
198 (63 overs); Suryakumar Yadav 65 (94); Himanshu Sangwan 5/60 (22 overs)		47/0 (11.4 overs); Mrunal Devdhar 27* (38)

Railways won by 10 wickets
Wankhede Stadium, Mumbai
Umpires: Nitin Pandit and Vineet Kulkarni
Player of the match: Karn Sharma (Railways)

- Railways won the toss and elected to field.
- Deepak Shetty (Mumbai) made his first-class debut.

25–28 December 2019
Scorecard

Saurashtra	v	Uttar Pradesh
331 (92.5 overs); Cheteshwar Pujara 57 (74); Saurabh Kumar 4/85 (43 overs)		523 (167.2 overs); Mohammad Saif 165 (382); Kamlesh Makvana 3/98 (42 overs)
120 (42.1 overs); Harvik Desai 50 (114); Saurabh Kumar 6/55 (20.1 overs)

Uttar Pradesh won by an innings and 72 runs
Saurashtra Cricket Association Stadium, Rajkot
Umpires: Anil Dandekar and Sundaram Ravi
Player of the match: Saurabh Kumar (Uttar Pradesh)

- Saurashtra won the toss and elected to bat.
- Parth Bhut (Saurashtra) made his first-class debut.

=== Round 4 ===
3–6 January 2020
Scorecard

Himachal Pradesh	v	Madhya Pradesh
175 (51 overs); Akash Vashist 33 (41); Avesh Khan 5/52 (18 overs)		427/9d (122.4 overs); Rameez Khan 192 (348); Pankaj Jaswal 4/106 (31 overs)
285/5 (85 overs); Ankit Kalsi 115 (151); Kuldeep Sen 2/66 (18 overs)

Match drawn
Himachal Pradesh Cricket Association Stadium, Dharamsala
Umpires: Ulhas Gandhe and Yeshwant Barde
Player of the match: Rameez Khan (Madhya Pradesh)

- Madhya Pradesh won the toss and elected to field.
- Gautam Raghuwanshi (Madhya Pradesh) made his first-class debut.

3–6 January 2020
Scorecard

Mumbai	v	Karnataka
194 (55.5 overs); Suryakumar Yadav 77* (94); Vasuki Koushik 3/45 (16 overs)		218 (68.5 overs); Ravikumar Samarth 86 (139); Shashank Attarde 5/58 (18.5 overs)
149 (50 overs); Sarfaraz Khan 71* (140); Prateek Jain 4/11 (9 overs)		129/5 (24.3 overs); Devdutt Padikkal 50 (46); Shashank Attarde 4/52 (10 overs)

Karnataka won by 5 wickets
Bandra Kurla Complex Ground, Mumbai
Umpires: Nitin Pandit and Sundaram Ravi
Player of the match: Ravikumar Samarth (Karnataka)

- Karnataka won the toss and elected to field.
- Rohan Kadam (Karnataka) made his first-class debut.

3–6 January 2020
Scorecard

Tamil Nadu	v	Uttar Pradesh
180 (63.4 overs); Laxmesha Suryaprakash 51 (159); Saurabh Kumar 5/44 (24.4 overs)		175 (71.1 overs); Mohammad Saif 77 (145); T. Natarajan 4/24 (16.1 overs)
154 (54.5 overs); Baba Aparajith 53 (130); Saurabh Kumar 5/39 (27 overs)		42/2 (7.4 overs); Rinku Singh 27 (25); T. Natarajan 2/13 (3.4 overs)

Match drawn
Green Park Stadium, Kanpur
Umpires: Vineet Kulkarni and C. K. Nandan
Player of the match: Saurabh Kumar (Uttar Pradesh)

- Uttar Pradesh won the toss and elected to field.
- No play was possible on day 1 due to rain.

3–6 January 2020
Scorecard

Baroda	v	Railways
201 (78 overs); Deepak Hooda 86 (180); Amit Mishra 4/51 (21 overs)		99 (50.1 overs); Dinesh Mor 26 (78); Anureet Singh 5/39 (19.1 overs)
98 (33.5 overs); Vishnu Solanki 44 (83); Himanshu Sangwan 4/24 (10 overs)		101 (25 overs); Karn Sharma 38 (21); Lukman Meriwala 6/25 (12 overs)

Baroda won by 99 runs
Moti Bagh Stadium, Vadodara
Umpires: Abhijit Bengeri and Chirra Ravikanthreddy

- Railways won the toss and elected to field.

=== Round 5 ===
11–14 January 2020
Scorecard

Madhya Pradesh	v	Railways
124 (55 overs); Rajat Patidar 38 (105); Himanshu Sangwan 6/33 (16 overs)		244 (84.5 overs); Dinesh Mor 45 (93); Kuldeep Sen 3/36 (14 overs)
330/9d (89.5 overs); Naman Ojha 118 (204); T Pradeep 4/47 (16.5 overs)		205/5 (54 overs); Mrunal Devdhar 93 (122); Avesh Khan 3/49 (17 overs)

Match drawn
Karnail Singh Stadium, Delhi
Umpires: Saiyed Khalid and Rajeev Godara
Player of the match: Mrunal Devdhar (Railways)

- Railways won the toss and elected to field.
- Saurabh Singh (Railways) made his first-class debut.

11–14 January 2020
Scorecard

Saurashtra	v	Karnataka
581/7d (166 overs); Cheteshwar Pujara 248 (390); Praveen Dubey 2/80 (16 overs)		171 (79 overs); Ravikumar Samarth 63 (174); Jaydev Unadkat 5/49 (15 overs)
		220/4 (89 overs); Devdutt Padikkal 53* (133); Dharmendrasinh Jadeja 2/97 (24 overs)

Match drawn
Saurashtra Cricket Association Stadium, Rajkot
Umpires: Lubabalo Gcuma and Sundaram Ravi
Player of the match: Cheteshwar Pujara (Saurashtra)

- Saurashtra won the toss and elected to bat.
- Praveen Dubey (Karnataka) made his first-class debut.
- Cheteshwar Pujara (Saurashtra) scored his 50th century in first-class cricket.

11–14 January 2020
Scorecard

Mumbai	v	Tamil Nadu
488 (148.4 overs); Aditya Tare 154 (253); Ravisrinivasan Sai Kishore 4/125 (46 overs)		324 (156.4 overs); Ravichandran Ashwin 79 (296); Shams Mulani 4/72 (47.4 overs)
		48/1 (22 overs) (f/o); Abhinav Mukund 19* (59); Shashank Attarde 1/6 (5 overs)

Match drawn
M. A. Chidambaram Stadium, Chennai
Umpires: Kamlesh Sharma and Navdeep Singh
Player of the match: Aditya Tare (Mumbai)

- Mumbai won the toss and elected to bat.
- Bhupen Lalwani, Hardik Tamore and Vinayak Bhoir (Mumbai) all made their first-class debuts.

11–14 January 2020
Scorecard

Uttar Pradesh	v	Baroda
431 (124.2 overs); Mohammad Saif 123 (179); Swapnil Singh 3/47 (17.2 overs)		230 (107.1 overs); Vishnu Solanki 91 (192); Saurabh Kumar 4/60 (41 overs)
		113/1 (34 overs) (f/o); Vishnu Solanki 58* (94); Saurabh Kumar 1/13 (6 overs)

Match drawn
Green Park Stadium, Kanpur
Umpires: Prahlad Rawat and Arun Kumar Basa
Player of the match: Mohammad Saif (Uttar Pradesh)

- Uttar Pradesh won the toss and elected to bat.
- Aaqib Khan and Wajid Ali (Uttar Pradesh) both made their first-class debuts.

=== Round 6 ===
19–22 January 2020
Scorecard

Saurashtra	v	Madhya Pradesh
344 (97.4 overs); Sheldon Jackson 186 (230); Gaurav Yadav 5/105 (23.4 overs)		280 (106.4 overs); Venkatesh Iyer 75 (123); Jaydev Unadkat 4/45 (24.4 overs)
256/9d (67.4 overs); Harvik Desai 115 (187); Gaurav Yadav 4/65 (17.4 overs)		223/9 (69 overs); Ajay Rohera 60 (106); Dharmendrasinh Jadeja 4/51 (22 overs)

Match drawn
Holkar Cricket Stadium, Indore
Umpires: Jayaraman Madanagopal and Kamlesh Sharma
Player of the match: Sheldon Jackson (Saurashtra)

- Madhya Pradesh won the toss and elected to field.

19–22 January 2020
Scorecard

Uttar Pradesh	v	Mumbai
625/8d (159.3 overs); Upendra Yadav 203* (239); Royston Dias 3/103 (30.3 overs)		688/7d (166.3 overs); Sarfaraz Khan 301* (391); Ankit Rajpoot 3/133 (40 overs)

Match drawn
Wankhede Stadium, Mumbai
Umpires: Sanjeev Dua and Lubabalo Gcuma
Player of the match: Sarfaraz Khan (Mumbai)

- Uttar Pradesh won the toss and elected to bat.
- Sarfaraz Khan (Mumbai) scored his maiden triple century in first-class cricket.

19–22 January 2020
Scorecard

Railways	v	Tamil Nadu
76 (39.1 overs); Saurabh Singh 22 (70); Ravichandran Ashwin 4/26 (14 overs)		330 (91 overs); Abhinav Mukund 100 (115); Harsh Tyagi 5/98 (31 overs)
90 (36.4 overs); Arindam Ghosh 22 (58); Ravisrinivasan Sai Kishore 5/16 (10.4 overs)

Tamil Nadu won by an innings and 164 runs
M. A. Chidambaram Stadium, Chennai
Umpires: Saiyed Khalid and Arun Kumar Basa
Player of the match: Abhinav Mukund (Tamil Nadu)

- Railways won the toss and elected to bat.

19–22 January 2020
Scorecard

Himachal Pradesh	v	Baroda
496 (130.5 overs); Akash Vashist 86 (147); Swapnil Singh 3/80 (31 overs)		105/2 (40 overs); Vishnu Solanki 85* (119); Vaibhav Arora 1/42 (9 overs)

Match drawn
Himachal Pradesh Cricket Association Stadium, Dharamsala
Umpires: Vineet Kulkarni and Rajeev Godara
Player of the match: Akash Vashist (Himachal Pradesh)

- Baroda won the toss and elected to field.
- No play was possible on day 3.

=== Round 7 ===
27–30 January 2020
Scorecard

Madhya Pradesh	v	Uttar Pradesh
230 (73 overs); Yash Dubey 70 (139); Saurabh Kumar 3/59 (16 overs)		216 (53 overs); Saurabh Kumar 98* (104); Ravi Yadav 5/61 (16 overs)
160 (52.3 overs); Naman Ojha 41 (62); Yash Dayal 4/52 (15.3 overs)		178/3 (56.4 overs); Aryan Juyal 74* (156); Kumar Kartikeya 2/49 (17.4 overs)

Uttar Pradesh won by 7 wickets
Holkar Cricket Stadium, Indore
Umpires: K Prabhakar Rao and Anil Dandekar
Player of the match: Saurabh Kumar (Uttar Pradesh)

- Uttar Pradesh won the toss and elected to field.
- Ravi Yadav (Madhya Pradesh), Mohsin Khan and Sameer Rizvi (Uttar Pradesh) all made their first-class debuts.

27–30 January 2020
Scorecard

Railways	v	Karnataka
182 (77.4 overs); Avinash Yadav 62 (143); Prateek Jain 5/38 (22 overs)		211 (71.1 overs); Srinivas Sharath 62 (191); Amit Mishra 5/70 (20 overs)
79 (30 overs); Mrunal Devdhar 38 (82); Ronit More 6/32 (11 overs)		51/0 (8.2 overs); Rohan Kadam 27* (31)

Karnataka won by 10 wickets
Karnail Singh Stadium, Delhi
Umpires: Sanjeev Dua and Madanagopal Kuppuraj
Player of the match: Ronit More (Karnataka)

- Karnataka won the toss and elected to field.

27–30 January 2020
Scorecard

Baroda	v	Saurashtra
154 (43.2 overs); Kedar Devdhar 52 (99); Jaydev Unadkat 6/34 (13 overs)		142 (46.1 overs); Harvik Desai 31 (51); Lukman Meriwala 5/64 (19 overs)
187 (54 overs); Deepak Hooda 52 (108); Jaydev Unadkat 6/72 (17 overs)		200/6 (59.3 overs); Harvik Desai 49 (131); Lukman Meriwala 2/35 (14 overs)

Saurashtra won by 4 wickets
Moti Bagh Stadium, Vadodara
Umpires: Nitin Pandit and Saiyed Khalid
Player of the match: Jaydev Unadkat (Saurashtra)

- Saurashtra won the toss and elected to field.

27–30 January 2020
Scorecard

Mumbai	v	Himachal Pradesh
372/5 (75 overs); Sarfaraz Khan 226* (213); Vaibhav Arora 2/28 (10 overs)

Match drawn
Himachal Pradesh Cricket Association Stadium, Dharamsala
Umpires: Vineet Kulkarni and Sundaram Ravi
Player of the match: Sarfaraz Khan (Mumbai)

- Himachal Pradesh won the toss and elected to field.
- No play was possible on days 2 and 3.

=== Round 8 ===
4–7 February 2020
Scorecard

Mumbai	v	Saurashtra
262 (92.3 overs); Sarfaraz Khan 78 (126); Dharmendrasinh Jadeja 5/92 (30 overs)		335 (114.2 overs); Sheldon Jackson 85 (151); Royston Dias 4/64 (26 overs)
362/7d (67 overs); Suryakumar Yadav 134 (130); Dharmendrasinh Jadeja 2/116 (27 overs)		158/7 (74 overs); Dharmendrasinh Jadeja 33* (125); Shashank Attarde 3/45 (24 overs)

Match drawn
Saurashtra Cricket Association Stadium, Rajkot
Umpires: Abhijit Bengeri and Sundaram Ravi
Player of the match: Shams Mulani (Mumbai)

- Mumbai won the toss and elected to bat.

4–7 February 2020
Scorecard

Baroda	v	Tamil Nadu
174 (51.4 overs); Atit Sheth 53 (60); M Mohammed 7/68 (18 overs)		490/7d (108.4 overs); Abhinav Mukund 206 (242); Yusuf Pathan 2/67 (21 overs)
259 (63.3 overs); Krunal Pandya 74 (95); Krishnamoorthy Vignesh 5/62 (16 overs)

Tamil Nadu won by an innings and 57 runs
Moti Bagh Stadium, Vadodara
Umpires: Greg Davidson and Abhijit Deshmukh
Player of the match: Abhinav Mukund (Tamil Nadu)

- Tamil Nadu won the toss and elected to field.

4–7 February 2020
Scorecard

Karnataka	v	Madhya Pradesh
426 (132 overs); Ravikumar Samarth 108 (300); Ravi Yadav 3/61 (24 overs)		431 (156.4 overs); Aditya Shrivastava 192 (339); Abhimanyu Mithun 3/69 (33 overs)
62/1 (15 overs); Devdutt Padikkal 31* (44); Gaurav Yadav 1/28 (6 overs)

Match drawn
KSCA Navule Stadium, Shimoga
Umpires: Nitin Pandit and Sadashiv Iyer
Player of the match: Aditya Shrivastava (Madhya Pradesh)

- Madhya Pradesh won the toss and elected to field.

4–7 February 2020
Scorecard

Himachal Pradesh	v	Railways
283 (82 overs); Nikhil Gangta 72 (141); T Pradeep 4/62 (21 overs)		545/7d (169.2 overs); Arindam Ghosh 204* (398); Akash Vashist 3/110 (43 overs)
165/3 (54 overs); Amit Kumar 71* (125); Himanshu Sangwan 1/30 (14 overs)

Match drawn
Karnail Singh Stadium, Delhi
Umpires: Anil Dandekar and Vineet Kulkarni
Player of the match: Arindam Ghosh (Railways)

- Himachal Pradesh won the toss and elected to bat.

=== Round 9 ===
12–15 February 2020
Scorecard

Tamil Nadu	v	Saurashtra
424 (128.4 overs); Narayan Jagadeesan 183* (256); Jaydev Unadkat 6/73 (22.4 overs)		481/9d (184 overs); Arpit Vasavada 132 (278); Krishnamoorthy Vignesh 3/78 (33 overs)

Match drawn
Saurashtra Cricket Association Stadium, Rajkot
Umpires: Ulhas Gandhe and Nitin Pandit
Player of the match: Jaydev Unadkat (Saurashtra)

- Tamil Nadu won the toss and elected to bat.
- Jaganath Sinivas (Tamil Nadu) made his first-class debut.

12–15 February 2020
Scorecard

Himachal Pradesh	v	Uttar Pradesh
220 (70.2 overs); Nikhil Gangta 49 (88); Aaqib Khan 5/42 (13.2 overs)		119 (42.4 overs); Akshdeep Nath 46 (82); Rishi Dhawan 5/32 (12.4 overs)
433/7d (107 overs); Akash Vasisht 141 (243); Saurabh Kumar 5/121 (35)		148 (40.4 overs); Aryan Juyal 56 (109); Vaibhav Arora 5/41 (10.4 overs)

Himachal Pradesh won by 386 runs
Bharat Ratna Shri Atal Bihari Vajpayee Ekana Cricket Stadium, Lucknow
Umpires: Anil Dandekar and Puttarangaiah Jayapal
Player of the match: Rishi Dhawan (Himachal Pradesh)

- Uttar Pradesh won the toss and elected to field.

12–15 February 2020
Scorecard

Baroda	v	Karnataka
85 (33.5 overs); Ahmadnoor Pathan 45 (83); Abhimanyu Mithun 3/26 (11 overs)		233 (72.5 overs); Karun Nair 47 (75); Soyeb Sopariya 5/83 (24.5 overs)
296 (89.5 overs); Ahmadnoor Pathan 90 (162); Prasidh Krishna 4/45 (17.5 overs)		150/2 (44.4 overs); Karun Nair 71* (126); Bhargav Bhatt 2/62 (19 overs)

Karnataka won by 8 wickets
M. Chinnaswamy Stadium, Bengaluru
Umpires: Abhijit Deshmukh and Krishnamachari Srinivasan
Player of the match: Karun Nair (Karnataka)

- Karnataka won the toss and elected to field.
- Parth Kohli (Baroda) made his first-class debut.

12–15 February 2020
Scorecard

Mumbai	v	Madhya Pradesh
427 (108.3 overs); Sarfaraz Khan 177 (210); Gaurav Yadav 4/101 (25 overs)		258 (67.2 overs); Venkatesh Iyer 93 (116); Ankush Jaiswal 4/58 (16.2 overs)
238/5d (48.5 overs); Hardik Tamore 113 (132); Mihir Hirwani 4/71 (14.5 overs)		314/6 (112 overs); Aditya Shrivastava 130* (287); Deepak Shetty 2/46 (16 overs)

Match drawn
Wankhede Stadium, Mumbai
Umpires: Greg Davidson and C. K. Nandan
Player of the match: Sarfaraz Khan (Mumbai)

- Mumbai won the toss and elected to bat.
- Aakarshit Gomel (Mumbai) made his first-class debut.
