= 2020–21 Vijay Hazare Trophy Group C =

Cricket tournament

- Dates: 20 – 28 February 2021
- Administrator(s): BCCI
- Cricket format: List A cricket
- Tournament format(s): Round-robin
- Participants: 6

The 2020–21 Vijay Hazare Trophy was the 19th season of the Vijay Hazare Trophy, a List A cricket tournament in India. It was contested by 38 teams, divided into six groups, with six teams in Group C. Bihar, Karnataka, Kerala, Odisha, Railways and Uttar Pradesh were placed in Group C, with all the matches taking place in Bangalore. Karnataka won Group C to qualify for the knockout stage of the tournament. Uttar Pradesh and Kerala qualified for the knockout stage as the next two best-placed teams.

== Points table ==
Team	Pld	W	L	T	NR	Pts	NRR
Karnataka (Q)	5	4	1	0	0	16	+1.834
Uttar Pradesh (Q)	5	4	1	0	0	16	+1.559
Kerala (Q)	5	4	1	0	0	16	+1.244
Railways	5	2	3	0	0	8	+0.103
Odisha	5	1	4	0	0	4	–1.363
Bihar	5	0	5	0	0	0	–3.494

- Top team advanced to the Knockout Stage

== Fixtures ==
=== Round 1 ===
20 February 2021
Scorecard

Odisha; 258/8 (45 overs)	v	Kerala; 233/4 (38.2 overs)
Sandeep Pattnaik 66 (75); S. Sreesanth 2/41 (8 overs)		Robin Uthappa 107 (85); Sourav Kanoja 3/43 (9 overs)

Kerala won by 34 runs (VJD method)
KSCA Cricket Ground, Alur
Umpires: Madanagopal Kuppuraj and Nikhil Patwardhan

- Kerala won the toss and elected to field.
- Kerala were set a revised target of 200 runs from 38.2 overs due to rain.
- Gourav Choudhury, Kartik Biswal, Sourav Kanoja (Odisha), Nedumankuzhy Basil and Vathsal Govind (Kerala) all made their List A debuts.

20 February 2021
Scorecard

Bihar; 189 (45.5 overs)	v	Railways; 190/0 (29 overs)
Anuj Raj 72 (93); T Pradeep 6/43 (10 overs)		Mrunal Devdhar 105* (91)

Railways won by 10 wickets
KSCA Cricket Ground, Alur
Umpires: Amit Bansal and Vineet Kulkarni

- Railways won the toss and elected to field.
- Akash Raj, Anuj Raj, Rahul Kumar and Shabbir Khan (Bihar) all made their List A debuts.

20 February 2021
Scorecard

Karnataka; 246/8 (50 overs)	v	Uttar Pradesh; 215/4 (45.2 overs)
Aniruddha Joshi 68 (48); Shivam Sharma 3/40 (9 overs)		Rinku Singh 62* (61); Shreyas Gopal 1/54 (8 overs)

Uttar Pradesh won by 9 runs (VJD method)
M. Chinnaswamy Stadium, Bangalore
Umpires: Sadashiv Iyer and Vinod Seshan

- Uttar Pradesh won the toss and elected to field.
- Uttar Pradesh were set a revised target of 207 runs from 45.2 overs due to rain.
- Karan Sharma, Sameer Choudhary and Shivam Sharma (Uttar Pradesh) all made their List A debuts.

=== Round 2 ===
22 February 2021
Scorecard

Uttar Pradesh; 283 (49.4 overs)	v	Kerala; 284/7 (48.5 overs)
Akshdeep Nath 68 (60); S. Sreesanth 5/65 (9.4 overs)		Robin Uthappa 81 (55); Karan Sharma 2/41 (10 overs)

Kerala won by 3 wickets
KSCA Cricket Ground, Alur
Umpires: Bharati Vij and Yeshwant Barde

- Kerala won the toss and elected to field.
- Rojith Ganesh (Kerala) made his List A debut.

22 February 2021
Scorecard

Karnataka; 354/3 (50 overs)	v	Bihar; 87 (27.2 overs)
Ravikumar Samarth 158* (144); Anuj Raj 2/68 (10 overs)		Sakibul Gani 37 (75); Prasidh Krishna 4/17 (6.1 overs)

Karnataka won by 267 runs
Just Cricket Academy Ground, Bengaluru
Umpires: Amit Bansal and Vineet Kulkarni

- Bihar won the toss and elected to field.

22 February 2021
Scorecard

Odisha; 230 (49.3 overs)	v	Railways; 231/2 (44.3 overs)
Ankit Yadav 48 (42); T Pradeep 3/54 (8.3 overs)		Shivam Chaudhary 81* (84); Shantanu Mishra 1/36 (7 overs)

Railways won by 8 wickets
M. Chinnaswamy Stadium, Bangalore
Umpires: Madanagopal Kuppuraj and Nikhil Patwardhan

- Railways won the toss and elected to field.

=== Round 3 ===
24 February 2021
Scorecard

Karnataka; 329/5 (50 overs)	v	Odisha; 228 (44 overs)
Devdutt Padikkal 152 (140); Suryakant Pradhan 2/53 (10 overs)		Subhranshu Senapati 78 (92); Prasidh Krishna 3/46 (8 overs)

Karnataka won by 101 runs
KSCA Cricket Ground, Alur
Umpires: Madanagopal Kuppuraj and Nikhil Patwardhan

- Odisha won the toss and elected to field.
- Harshit Rathod (Odisha) and Vijaykumar Vyshak (Karnataka) both made their List A debuts.

24 February 2021
Scorecard

Bihar; 193 (46.1 overs)	v	Uttar Pradesh; 194/5 (28 overs)
Yashasvi Rishav 67 (114); Shivam Sharma 7/31 (10 overs)		Priyam Garg 57 (38); Ashutosh Aman 2/44 (8 overs)

Uttar Pradesh won by 5 wickets
KSCA Cricket Ground, Alur
Umpires: Bharati Vij and Yeshwant Barde

- Uttar Pradesh won the toss and elected to field.
- Aaqib Khan (Uttar Pradesh), Lakhan Raja, Rishav Raj, Suraj Kashyap and Yashasvi Rishav (Bihar) all made their List A debuts.

24 February 2021
Scorecard

Kerala; 351/6 (50 overs)	v	Railways; 344 (49.4 overs)
Vishnu Vinod 107 (107); T Pradeep 2/50 (10 overs)		Mrunal Devdhar 79 (80); M. D. Nidheesh 3/83 (9.4 overs)

Kerala won by 7 runs
Just Cricket Academy Ground, Bengaluru
Umpires: Sadashiv Iyer and Vinod Seshan

- Railways won the toss and elected to field.

=== Round 4 ===
26 February 2021
Scorecard

Bihar; 255/7 (50 overs)	v	Odisha; 258/3 (48.1 overs)
Babul Kumar 78 (71); Shantanu Mishra 3/46 (10 overs)		Shantanu Mishra 76 (107); Rahul Kumar 1/37 (6 overs)

Odisha won by 7 wickets
KSCA Cricket Ground, Alur
Umpires: Madanagopal Kuppuraj and Nikhil Patwardhan

- Bihar won the toss and elected to bat.
- Apurva Anand (Bihar), Prabin Luha and Rakesh Pattnaik (Odisha) all made their List A debuts.

26 February 2021
Scorecard

Uttar Pradesh; 346/6 (50 overs)	v	Railways; 276 (46.1 overs)
Priyam Garg 115 (89); Ananta Saha 3/66 (10 overs)		Shivam Chaudhary 107* (103); Shivam Mavi 4/51 (9 overs)

Uttar Pradesh won by 70 runs
KSCA Cricket Ground, Alur
Umpires: Amit Bansal and Vineet Kulkarni

- Railways won the toss and elected to field.

26 February 2021
Scorecard

Kerala; 277/8 (50 overs)	v	Karnataka; 279/1 (45.3 overs)
Vathsal Govind 95 (124); Abhimanyu Mithun 5/52 (10 overs)		Devdutt Padikkal 126* (138); Jalaj Saxena 1/36 (10 overs)

Karnataka won by 9 wickets
M. Chinnaswamy Stadium, Bangalore
Umpires: Sadashiv Iyer and Vinod Seshan

- Karnataka won the toss and elected to field.

=== Round 5 ===
28 February 2021
Scorecard

Railways; 284/9 (50 overs)	v	Karnataka; 285/0 (40.3 overs)
Pratham Singh 129 (138); Shreyas Gopal 3/41 (10 overs)		Devdutt Padikkal 145* (125)

Karnataka won by 10 wickets
M. Chinnaswamy Stadium, Bangalore
Umpires: Bharati Vij and Yeshwant Barde

- Karnataka won the toss and elected to field.
- Abhishek Pandey (Railways) made his List A debut.

28 February 2021
Scorecard

Bihar; 148 (40.2 overs)	v	Kerala; 149/1 (8.5 overs)
Babul Kumar 64 (89); S. Sreesanth 4/30 (9 overs)		Robin Uthappa 87* (32); Ashutosh Aman 1/19 (1 over)

Kerala won by 9 wickets
KSCA Cricket Ground, Alur
Umpires: Amit Bansal and Vineet Kulkarni

- Kerala won the toss and elected to field.
- Faisal Fanoos (Kerala) and Vikash Patel (Bihar) both made their List A debuts.

28 February 2021
Scorecard

Odisha; 148 (40.1 overs)	v	Uttar Pradesh; 154/4 (21.4 overs)
Subhranshu Senapati 49* (68); Shivam Sharma 6/22 (8.1 overs)		Upendra Yadav 32 (22); Rajesh Mohanty 2/37 (6 overs)

Uttar Pradesh won by 6 wickets
Just Cricket Academy Ground, Bengaluru
Umpires: Sadashiv Iyer and Vinod Seshan

- Uttar Pradesh won the toss and elected to field.
- Tarani Sa (Odisha) made his List A debut.
