= 2021–22 Syed Mushtaq Ali Trophy Group D =

Cricket tournament

- Dates: 4 – 22 November 2021
- Administrator(s): BCCI
- Cricket format: Twenty20 cricket
- Tournament format(s): Round-robin
- Participants: 6

The 2021–22 Syed Mushtaq Ali Trophy was the fourteenth season of the Syed Mushtaq Ali Trophy, a Twenty20 cricket tournament played in India. It was contested by 38 teams, divided into six groups, with six teams in Group D. The tournament was announced by BCCI on 3 July 2021.

Gujarat won four of their five matches, with Kerala winning three matches. Therefore, Gujarat advanced to the quarter-finals and Kerala progressed to the preliminary quarter-finals by winning their last league match against Madhya Pradesh.

== Points table ==
Pos	Team	Pld	W	L	NR	Pts	NRR
1	Gujarat	5	4	1	0	16	1.109
2	Kerala (Note: Kerala finishing second and qualified for the knockout stage by winning their last league match against Madhya Pradesh, despite having lesser net run rate than the latter team.)	5	3	2	0	12	0.363
3	Madhya Pradesh	5	3	2	0	12	1.147
4	Assam	5	2	3	0	8	−0.533
5	Railways	5	2	3	0	8	−0.654
6	Bihar	5	1	4	0	4	−1.370

Source: ESPN Cricinfo
Notes:

Advanced to Quarter-final
Advanced to Preliminary quarter-final

== Fixtures ==
=== Round 1 ===
4 November 2021
Scorecard

Assam; 103/9 (20 overs)	v	Madhya Pradesh; 105/4 (14 overs)
Abhishek Thakuri 35 (41); Avesh Khan 3/14 (4 overs)		Venkatesh Iyer 37 (23); Roshan Alam 3/20 (4 overs)

Madhya Pradesh won by 6 wickets
Arun Jaitley Stadium, Delhi
Umpires: Sadashiv Iyer and Virender Sharma

- Madhya Pradesh won the toss and elected to field.
- Kuldeep Gehi and Shubham Sharma (Madhya Pradesh) both made their T20 debuts.

4 November 2021
Scorecard

Bihar; 169/4 (20 overs)	v	Railways; 134 (18 overs)
Bipin Saurabh 72 (54); Himanshu Sangwan 2/31 (4 overs)		Pratham Singh 61 (48); Abhijeet Saket 3/15 (3 overs)

Bihar won by 35 runs
Arun Jaitley Stadium, Delhi
Umpires: Sadashiv Iyer and Virender Sharma

- Railways won the toss and elected to field.
- Yashasvi Rishav, Hirshi Raj and Bipin Saurabh (Bihar) all made their T20 debuts.

4 November 2021
Scorecard

Kerala; 123/5 (20 overs)	v	Gujarat; 126/1 (15.3 overs)
Sanju Samson 54* (43); Roosh Kalaria 2/31 (4 overs)		Priyank Panchal 66 (46); KM Asif 1/24 (3.3 overs)

Gujarat won by 9 wickets
Palam A Stadium, Delhi
Umpires: Jayaraman Madanagopal and Saiyed Khalid

- Gujarat won the toss and elected to field.
- Het Patel, Saurav Chauhan (Gujarat), Rojith Ganesh and Sharafuddeen (Kerala) all made their T20 debuts.

=== Round 2 ===
5 November 2021
Scorecard

Railways; 97/9 (16 overs)	v	Madhya Pradesh; 100/3 (13.5 overs)
Shubham Chaubey 24 (22); Avesh Khan 3/23 (4 overs)		Venkatesh Iyer 50* (41); Karn Sharma 1/13 (3 overs)

Madhya Pradesh won by 7 wickets
Arun Jaitley Stadium, Delhi
Umpires: Jayaraman Madanagopal and Saiyed Khalid

- Madhya Pradesh won the toss and elected to field.
- The match was reduced to 16 overs per side due to bad weather.
- Ananta Saha (Railways) made his T20 debut.

5 November 2021
Scorecard

Gujarat; 89 (19.2 overs)	v	Assam; 90/3 (13.1 overs)
Ripal Patel 21 (25); Mukhtar Hussain 3/20 (4 overs)		Abhishek Thakuri 23 (32); Piyush Chawla 2/29 (4 overs)

Assam won by 7 wickets
Arun Jaitley Stadium, Delhi
Umpires: Jayaraman Madanagopal and Saiyed Khalid

- Gujarat won the toss and elected to bat.

5 November 2021
Scorecard

Bihar; 131/5 (20 overs)	v	Kerala; 132/3 (14.1 overs)
Sakibul Gani 53* (41); Basil Thampi 3/19 (4 overs)		Robin Uthappa 57* (34); Ashutosh Aman 2/31 (4 overs)

Kerala won by 7 wickets
Palam A Stadium, Delhi
Umpires: Anil Dandekar and Sundaram Ravi

- Bihar won the toss and elected to bat.

=== Round 3 ===
6 November 2021
Scorecard

Railways; 144/6 (20 overs)	v	Kerala; 138/6 (20 overs)
Upendra Yadav 39* (37); Sudhesan Midhun 3/24 (4 overs)		Vishnu Vinod 62* (43); Yuvraj Singh 3/23 (4 overs)

Railways won by 6 runs
Arun Jaitley Stadium, Delhi
Umpires: Anil Dandekar and Sundaram Ravi

- Kerala won the toss and elected to field.

6 November 2021
Scorecard

Bihar; 135/8 (20 overs)	v	Assam; 136/7 (18.5 overs)
Babul Kumar 82 (57); Rajjakuddin Ahmed 3/24 (4 overs)		Riyan Parag 58 (33); Abhijeet Saket 2/25 (4 overs)

Assam won by 3 wickets
Arun Jaitley Stadium, Delhi
Umpires: Anil Dandekar and Sundaram Ravi

- Bihar won the toss and elected to bat.
- Kumar Rajnish and Malay Raj (Bihar) both made their T20 debuts.

6 November 2021
Scorecard

Gujarat; 162/3 (20 overs)	v	Madhya Pradesh; 112 (18.3 overs)
Priyank Panchal 79 (57); Mihir Hirwani 1/16 (4 overs)		Venkatesh Iyer 31 (24); Arzan Nagwaswalla 3/25 (3.3 overs)

Gujarat won by 50 runs
Palam A Stadium, Delhi
Umpires: Sadashiv Iyer and Virender Sharma

- Madhya Pradesh won the toss and elected to field.

=== Round 4 ===
8 November 2021
Scorecard

Assam; 121/8 (20 overs)	v	Kerala; 122/2 (18 overs)
Riyan Parag 24 (24); Basil Thampi 3/21 (4 overs)		Rohan Kunnummal 56* (53); Rajjakuddin Ahmed 1/6 (2 overs)

Kerala won by 8 wickets
Arun Jaitley Stadium, Delhi
Umpires: Sadashiv Iyer and Virender Sharma

- Kerala won the toss and elected to field.
- Sajeevan Akhil (Kerala) made his T20 debut.

8 November 2021
Scorecard

Railways; 132/9 (20 overs)	v	Gujarat; 133/2 (12 overs)
Upendra Yadav 41 (31); Hardik Patel 3/21 (4 overs)		Urvil Patel 59 (29); Akshat Pandey 1/28 (2 overs)

Gujarat won by 8 wickets
Arun Jaitley Stadium, Delhi
Umpires: Sadashiv Iyer and Virender Sharma

- Gujarat won the toss and elected to field.

8 November 2021
Scorecard

Bihar; 59 (18 overs)	v	Madhya Pradesh; 60/1 (5.4 overs)
Sakibul Gani 21 (19); Avesh Khan 3/6 (3 overs)		Venkatesh Iyer 36* (20); Suraj Kashyap 1/11 (1 over)

Madhya Pradesh won by 9 wickets
Palam A Stadium, Delhi
Umpires: Jayaraman Madanagopal and Saiyed Khalid

- Bihar won the toss and elected to bat.
- Shashi Anand and Shekhar Kumar Singh (Bihar) both made their T20 debuts.

=== Round 5 ===
9 November 2021
Scorecard

Bihar; 118/6 (20 overs)	v	Gujarat; 121/5 (19.1 overs)
Mangal Mahrour 64* (51); Tejas Patel 3/27 (4 overs)		Het Patel 45* (52); Ashutosh Aman 2/10 (4 overs)

Gujarat won by 5 wickets
Arun Jaitley Stadium, Delhi
Umpires: Anil Dandekar and Sundaram Ravi

- Gujarat won the toss and elected to field.
- Anunay Singh (Bihar) made his T20 debut.

9 November 2021
Scorecard

Madhya Pradesh; 171/5 (20 overs)	v	Kerala; 172/2 (18 overs)
Rajat Patidar 77 (49); Sajeevan Akhil 2/35 (4 overs)		Sanju Samson 56* (33); Kumar Kartikeya 1/25 (4 overs)

Kerala won by 8 wickets
Arun Jaitley Stadium, Delhi
Umpires: Anil Dandekar and Sundaram Ravi

- Kerala won the toss and elected to field.

9 November 2021
Scorecard

Railways; 165/6 (20 overs)	v	Assam; 117/6 (20 overs)
Mrunal Devdhar 51 (48); Mukhtar Hussain 3/26 (3 overs)		Denish Das 35 (47); Dhrushant Soni 2/21 (3 overs)

Railways won by 48 runs
Palam A Stadium, Delhi
Umpires: Jayaraman Madanagopal and Saiyed Khalid

- Railways won the toss and elected to bat.
- Akash Sengupta (Assam) and Mohammad Saif (Railways) both made their T20 debuts.
