= 2022–23 Syed Mushtaq Ali Trophy Group D =

Cricket tournament

- Dates: 11 October – 5 November 2022
- Administrator(s): BCCI
- Cricket format: Twenty20 cricket
- Tournament format(s): Round-robin
- Participants: 8

The 2022–23 Syed Mushtaq Ali Trophy was the fifteenth season of the Syed Mushtaq Ali Trophy, a Twenty20 cricket tournament played in India. It was contested by 38 teams, divided into five groups, with seven teams in Group D. The tournament was announced by BCCI on 8 August 2022.

== Points table ==
| Pos | Team | Pld | W | L | NR | Pts | NRR |
|---|---|---|---|---|---|---|---|
| 1 | Himachal Pradesh | 6 | 4 | 0 | 2 | 20 | 2.053 |
| 2 | Saurashtra | 6 | 4 | 1 | 1 | 18 | 1.568 |
| 3 | Gujarat | 6 | 4 | 1 | 1 | 18 | 1.673 |
| 4 | Baroda | 6 | 3 | 3 | 0 | 12 | 0.515 |
| 5 | Andhra Pradesh | 6 | 2 | 2 | 2 | 12 | −0.133 |
| 6 | Bihar | 6 | 1 | 5 | 0 | 4 | −1.480 |
| 7 | Nagaland | 6 | 0 | 6 | 0 | 0 | −3.108 |

Updated to match(es) played on 22 October 2022. Source: ESPN Cricinfo

Advanced to Quarter-final
Advanced to Preliminary quarter-final

== Fixtures ==
=== Round 1 ===
11 October 2022
Scorecard

| Gujarat | v | Himachal Pradesh |

Match abandoned without a ball bowled
Daly College Ground, Indore
Umpires: Saurabh Dhote and Puttarangaiah Jayapal

- No toss.
- No play was possible due to a wet outfield.

11 October 2022
Scorecard

| Nagaland; 90/7 (20 overs) | v | Baroda; 91/3 (14 overs) |
| Chetan Bist 36* (37); Atit Sheth 3/7 (3 overs) | | Mitesh Patel 33* (34); Chopise Hopongkyu 2/10 (3 overs) |

Baroda won by 7 wickets
Holkar Stadium, Indore
Umpires: Abhijit Bengeri and Akshay Totre

- Nagaland won the toss and elected to bat.
- Harsh Desai (Baroda) made his T20 debut.
- Impact Player Subs: Mughavi Wotsa for Sedezhalie Rupero (Nagaland) and Harsh Desai for Chinta Gandhi (Baroda).

11 October 2022
Scorecard

| Andhra Pradesh | v | Saurashtra |

Match abandoned without a ball bowled
Holkar Stadium, Indore
Umpires: Abhijit Bengeri and Akshay Totre

- No toss.
- No play was possible due to a wet outfield.

=== Round 2 ===
12 October 2022
Scorecard

| Baroda; 175/4 (20 overs) | v | Saurashtra; 178/6 (19.4 overs) |
| Mitesh Patel 60 (35); Dharmendrasinh Jadeja 1/27 (4 overs) | | Samarth Vyas 97 (52); Krunal Pandya 2/30 (4 overs) |

Saurashtra won by 4 wickets
Holkar Stadium, Indore
Umpires: Abhijit Bengeri and Puttarangaiah Jayapal

- Saurashtra won the toss and elected to field.
- Safvan Patel (Baroda) and Tarang Gohel (Saurashtra) both made their T20 debuts.
- Impact Player Subs: Parth Chauhan for Yuvraj Chudasama (Saurashtra) and Safvan Patel for Dhruv Patel (Baroda).

12 October 2022
Scorecard

| Andhra Pradesh | v | Himachal Pradesh |

Match abandoned without a ball bowled
Daly College Ground, Indore
Umpires: Saurabh Dhote and Saidharshan Kumar

- No toss.
- No play was possible due to a wet outfield.

12 October 2022
Scorecard

| Nagaland; 145/8 (20 overs) | v | Bihar; 148/4 (19.1 overs) |
| Rongsen Jonathan 66 (60); Anuj Raj 4/32 (4 overs) | | Mangal Mahrour 47 (39); Tahmeed Rahman 1/18 (2 overs) |

Bihar won by 6 wickets
Holkar Stadium, Indore
Umpires: Abhijit Bengeri and Puttarangaiah Jayapal

- Nagaland won the toss and elected to bat.
- Raghuvendra Pratap Singh and Rishav Raj (Bihar) both made their T20 debuts.
- Impact Player Sub: Chopise Hopongkyu for Sedezhalie Rupero (Nagaland).

=== Round 3 ===
14 October 2022
Scorecard

| Saurashtra; 203/5 (20 overs) | v | Nagaland; 106/5 (20 overs) |
| Samarth Vyas 97* (51); Akash Singh 2/30 (4 overs); Imliwati Lemtur 2/30 (4 overs) | | Chetan Bist 33 (28); Yuvraj Chudasama 1/12 (3 overs) |

Saurashtra won by 97 runs
Daly College Ground, Indore
Umpires: Abhijit Bengeri and Saidharshan Kumar

- Nagaland won the toss and elected to field.
- Impact Player Subs: Nzanthung Mozhui for Chopise Hopongkyu (Nagaland) and Parth Bhut for Tarang Gohel (Saurashtra).

14 October 2022
Scorecard

| Himachal Pradesh; 179/7 (20 overs) | v | Bihar; 150/6 (20 overs) |
| Sumeet Verma 50 (33); Ashutosh Aman 2/33 (4 overs) | | Sakibul Gani 48 (29); Vaibhav Arora 3/34 (4 overs) |

Himachal Pradesh won by 29 runs
Holkar Stadium, Indore
Umpires: Saurabh Dhote and Akshay Totre

- Bihar won the toss and elected to field.
- Apurva Anand and Anshuman Raj (Bihar) both made their T20 debuts.
- Impact Player Subs: Kanwar Abhinay for Nikhil Gangta (Himachal Pradesh) and Raghuvendra Pratap Singh for Apurva Anand (Bihar).

14 October 2022
Scorecard

| Baroda; 153 (20 overs) | v | Gujarat; 156/8 (20 overs) |
| Krunal Pandya 57 (38); Arzan Nagwaswalla 2/24 (4 overs) | | Priyank Panchal 44 (31); Ninad Rathva 3/4 (1 over) |

Gujarat won by 2 wickets
Holkar Stadium, Indore
Umpires: Saurabh Dhote and Akshay Totre

- Baroda won the toss and elected to bat.
- Vishal Jayswal (Gujarat) made his T20 debut.
- Impact Player Subs: Hemang Patel for Chintan Gaja (Gujarat) and Lukman Meriwala for Harsh Desai (Baroda).

=== Round 4 ===
16 October 2022
Scorecard

| Gujarat; 162/7 (20 overs) | v | Saurashtra; 164/7 (19 overs) |
| Chirag Gandhi 63 (29); Yuvraj Chudasama 2/22 (4 overs) | | Cheteshwar Pujara 38 (27); Piyush Chawla 2/26 (4 overs) |

Saurashtra won by 3 wickets
Holkar Stadium, Indore
Umpires: Saurabh Dhote and Puttarangaiah Jayapal

- Saurashtra won the toss and elected to field.
- Impact Player Subs: Hardik Patel for Urvil Patel (Gujarat) and Parth Chauhan for Tarang Gohel (Saurashtra).

16 October 2022
Scorecard

| Baroda; 156/5 (20 overs) | v | Bihar; 120/8 (20 overs) |
| Ambati Rayudu 52* (37); Anuj Raj 2/19 (4 overs) | | Sachin Kumar 38 (35); Ninad Rathva 3/10 (4 overs) |

Baroda won by 36 runs
Daly College Ground, Indore
Umpires: Abhijit Bengeri and Akshay Totre

- Baroda won the toss and elected to bat.
- Impact Player Sub: Atit Sheth for Harsh Desai (Baroda).

16 October 2022
Scorecard

| Nagaland; 169/4 (20 overs) | v | Andhra Pradesh; 173/5 (19 overs) |
| Shrikant Mundhe 91* (53); Bandaru Ayyappa 2/42 (4 overs) | | Ashwin Hebbar 51 (25); Imliwati Lemtur 3/20 (4 overs) |

Andhra Pradesh won by 5 wickets
Holkar Stadium, Indore
Umpires: Saurabh Dhote and Puttarangaiah Jayapal

- Nagaland won the toss and elected to bat.
- Shaik Rasheed and Abhishek Reddy (Andhra Pradesh) both made their T20 debuts.
- Impact Player Sub: Shaik Rasheed for Lalith Mohan (Andhra Pradesh).

=== Round 5 ===
18 October 2022
Scorecard

| Bihar; 181/2 (20 overs) | v | Andhra Pradesh; 186/8 (19.4 overs) |
| Babul Kumar 72 (50); K. V. Sasikanth 2/36 (4 overs) | | Karan Shinde 75 (38); Abhijeet Saket 3/31 (4 overs) |

Andhra Pradesh won by 2 wickets
Holkar Stadium, Indore
Umpires: Puttarangaiah Jayapal and Saidharshan Kumar

- Bihar won the toss and elected to bat.
- Sakib Hussain and Pieter Mardi (Bihar) both made their T20 debuts.
- Impact Player Subs: Anunay Singh for Babul Kumar (Bihar) and Girinath Reddy for Lalith Mohan (Andhra Pradesh).

18 October 2022
Scorecard

| Nagaland; 119/8 (20 overs) | v | Gujarat; 122/1 (9.5 overs) |
| Shrikant Mundhe 45 (39); Roosh Kalaria 2/20 (4 overs) | | Saurav Chauhan 84* (35); Akash Singh 1/20 (2 overs) |

Gujarat won by 9 wickets
Daly College Ground, Indore
Umpires: Saurabh Dhote and Akshay Totre

- Gujarat won the toss and elected to field.

18 October 2022
Scorecard

| Himachal Pradesh; 157/8 (20 overs) | v | Saurashtra; 144/9 (20 overs) |
| Nikhil Gangta 54 (39); Jaydev Unadkat 2/24 (4 overs) | | Cheteshwar Pujara 57 (38); Rishi Dhawan 3/25 (4 overs) |

Himachal Pradesh won by 13 runs
Holkar Stadium, Indore
Umpires: Puttarangaiah Jayapal and Saidharshan Kumar

- Saurashtra won the toss and elected to field.
- Impact Player Subs: Nikhil Gangta for Sumeet Verma (Himachal Pradesh) and Parth Chauhan for Tarang Gohel (Saurashtra).

=== Round 6 ===
20 October 2022
Scorecard

| Andhra Pradesh; 129/9 (20 overs) | v | Gujarat; 132/5 (18 overs) |
| K. V. Sasikanth 26 (18); Chintan Gaja 3/33 (4 overs) | | Priyank Panchal 59 (45); Lalith Mohan 2/18 (4 overs) |

Gujarat won by 5 wickets
Holkar Stadium, Indore
Umpires: Abhijit Bengeri and Saurabh Dhote

- Gujarat won the toss and elected to field.
- Impact Player Subs: Manish Golamaru for Abhishek Reddy (Andhra Pradesh) and Priyesh Patel for Hardik Patel (Gujarat).

20 October 2022
Scorecard

| Bihar; 119 (19.4 overs) | v | Saurashtra; 124/2 (14.1 overs) |
| Piyush Singh 21 (23); Chetan Sakariya 3/26 (4 overs) | | Harvik Desai 59* (46); Anuj Raj 1/18 (2 overs) |

Saurashtra won by 8 wickets
Daly College Ground, Indore
Umpires: Puttarangaiah Jayapal and Saidharshan Kumar

- Bihar won the toss and elected to bat.
- Roshan Madhav (Bihar) made his T20 debut.
- Impact Player Sub: Roshan Madhav for Babul Kumar (Bihar).

20 October 2022
Scorecard

| Baroda; 129/8 (20 overs) | v | Himachal Pradesh; 130/2 (16.5 overs) |
| Krunal Pandya 31 (24); Mayank Dagar 2/14 (4 overs) | | Prashant Chopra 61* (48); Kartik Kakade 1/13 (2.5 overs) |

Himachal Pradesh won by 8 wickets
Holkar Stadium, Indore
Umpires: Abhijit Bengeri and Saurabh Dhote

- Himachal Pradesh won the toss and elected to field.
- Impact Player Subs: Atit Sheth for Harsh Desai (Baroda) and Vaibhav Arora for Digvijay Rangi (Himachal Pradesh).

=== Round 7 ===
22 October 2022
Scorecard

| Nagaland; 86/8 (20 overs) | v | Himachal Pradesh; 88/1 (9 overs) |
| Chetan Bist 26* (26); Kanwar Abhinay 3/13 (3 overs) | | Ekant Sen 31* (20); Akash Singh 1/27 (3 overs) |

Himachal Pradesh won by 9 wickets
Holkar Stadium, Indore
Umpires: Abhijit Bengeri and Puttarangaiah Jayapal

- Nagaland won the toss and elected to bat.
- Merenka Jamir (Nagaland) made his T20 debut.
- Impact Player Sub: Sedezhalie Rupero for Nzanthung Mozhui (Nagaland).

22 October 2022
Scorecard

| Baroda; 161/6 (20 overs) | v | Andhra Pradesh; 150/6 (20 overs) |
| Ninad Rathva 42 (30); Bandaru Ayyappa 1/18 (4 overs) | | Karan Shinde 42* (26); Ninad Rathva 2/16 (4 overs) |

Baroda won by 11 runs
Daly College Ground, Indore
Umpires: Saidharshan Kumar and Akshay Totre

- Andhra Pradesh won the toss and elected to field.
- Mahesh Pithiya and Jyotsnil Singh (Baroda) both made their T20 debuts.
- Impact Player Subs: Bandaru Ayyappa for Lalith Mohan (Andhra Pradesh) and Safvan Patel for Jyotsnil Singh (Baroda).

22 October 2022
Scorecard

| Bihar; 161/7 (20 overs) | v | Gujarat; 165/6 (14 overs) |
| Mangal Mahrour 51* (37); Chintan Gaja 2/35 (4 overs) | | Urvil Patel 84 (37); Sakib Hussain 4/20 (2 overs) |

Gujarat won by 4 wickets
Holkar Stadium, Indore
Umpires: Abhijit Bengeri and Puttarangaiah Jayapal

- Gujarat won the toss and elected to field.
- Impact Player Subs: Mangal Mahrour for Babul Kumar (Bihar) and Saurav Chauhan for Hardik Patel (Gujarat).
