= 2023–24 Syed Mushtaq Ali Trophy =

Indian cricket tournament

- Dates: 16 October – 6 November 2023
- Administrator: BCCI
- Cricket format: T20
- Tournament format(s): Round robin, then knockout
- Champions: Punjab (1st title)
- Participants: 38
- Matches: 136
- Player of the series: Abhishek Sharma (Punjab)
- Most runs: Riyan Parag (510) (Assam)
- Most wickets: Ravi Teja (19) (Hyderabad)
- Official website: http://www.bcci.tv

The 2023–24 Syed Mushtaq Ali Trophy was the sixteenth edition of the Syed Mushtaq Ali Trophy, an annual Twenty20 tournament in India. Played from 16 October to 6 November 2023, it was contested by all 38 Ranji Trophy teams and won by Punjab, their first title. In the final, they defeated Baroda by 20 runs. All 38 senior state teams were divided into five groups, with eight teams in three groups, and seven teams in two groups. The tournament formed part of the 2023–24 Indian domestic cricket season as announced by the Board of Control for Cricket in India (BCCI) in April 2023. Mumbai were the defending champions. They were eliminated in the quarter-finals.

== Group stage ==
=== Group A ===
Pos	Team	Pld	W	L	NR	Pts	NRR	Qualification
1	Mumbai	7	6	1	0	24	1.976	Advanced to Quarter-final
2	Baroda	7	6	1	0	24	1.583	Advanced to Quarter-final
3	Hyderabad	7	6	1	0	24	1.371	
4	Haryana	7	3	4	0	12	0.995	
5	Chhattisgarh	7	3	4	0	12	0.005	
6	Jammu & Kashmir	7	3	4	0	12	−0.431	
7	Mizoram	7	1	6	0	4	−2.291	
8	Meghalaya	7	0	7	0	0	−2.932	

Updated to match(es) played on 17 October 2023. Source: ESPN Cricinfo

=== Group B ===
Pos	Team	Pld	W	L	NR	Pts	NRR	Qualification
1	Kerala	7	6	1	0	24	2.052	Advanced to Quarter-final
2	Assam	7	5	2	0	20	1.125	Advanced to Preliminary quarter-final
3	HimachalPradesh	7	5	2	0	20	1.813	
4	Services	7	4	3	0	16	0.454	
5	Odisha	7	4	3	0	16	0.453	
6	Chandigarh	7	3	4	0	12	0.569	
7	Bihar	7	1	6	0	4	−1.122	
8	Sikkim	7	0	7	0	0	−5.387	

Updated to match(es) played on 17 October 2023. Source: ESPN Cricinfo

=== Group C ===
Pos	Team	Pld	W	L	NR	Pts	NRR	Qualification
1	Punjab	7	6	1	0	24	3.727	Advanced to Quarter-final
2	Gujarat	7	5	2	0	20	1.842	Advanced to Preliminary quarter-final
3	Saurashtra	7	5	2	0	20	2.324	
4	Goa	7	4	3	0	16	0.747	
5	Railways	7	4	3	0	16	0.748	
6	Andhra	7	3	4	0	12	0.167	
7	Manipur	7	1	6	0	4	−3.067	
8	Arunachal Pradesh	7	0	7	0	0	−6.946	

Updated to match(es) played on 17 October 2023. Source: ESPN Cricinfo

=== Group D ===
Pos	Team	Pld	W	L	NR	Pts	NRR	Qualification
1	Vidarbha	6	4	2	0	16	0.913	Advanced to Quarter-final
2	Bengal	6	4	2	0	16	0.404	Advanced to Preliminary quarter-final
3	Jharkhand	6	4	2	0	16	0.154	
4	Rajasthan	6	3	2	1	14	0.453	
5	Maharashtra	6	3	3	0	12	0.428	
6	Uttarakhand	6	2	4	0	8	0.046	
7	Pondicherry	6	0	5	1	2	−2.660	

Updated to match(es) played on 17 October 2023. Source: ESPN Cricinfo

=== Group E ===
Pos	Team	Pld	W	L	NR	Pts	NRR	Qualification
1	Delhi	6	5	0	1	22	2.973	Advanced to Quarter-final
2	Uttar Pradesh	6	3	2	1	14	1.816	Advanced to Preliminary quarter-final
3	Karnataka	6	3	2	1	14	1.358	
4	Madhya Pradesh	6	3	2	1	14	0.181	
5	Tamil Nadu	6	3	2	1	14	−0.282	
6	Tripura	6	1	5	0	4	−2.387	
7	Nagaland	6	0	5	1	2	−3.226	

Updated to match(es) played on 17 October 2023. Source: ESPN Cricinfo

== Knockout Stage ==
Preliminary QF
C2	Gujarat	127/8 (20 overs)
E2	Uttar Pradesh	130/4 (18.4 overs)
B2	Assam	142/2 (17.5 overs)
D2	Bengal	138/8 (20 overs)

Quarter-finals
C1	Punjab	174/5 (19.1 overs)
E2	Uttar Pradesh	169/3 (20 overs)
E1	Delhi	176/6 (20 overs)
D1	Vidarbha	137/9 (20 overs)
B1	Kerala	158/6 (20 overs)
B2	Assam	162/4 (17.1 overs)
A1	Mumbai	148/8 (20 overs)
A2	Baroda	149/7 (18.5 overs)

Semi-finals
C1	Punjab	184/4 (18.4 overs)
D1	Delhi	183/7 (20 overs)
A2	Baroda	146/4 (16.1 overs)
B2	Assam	143 (20 overs)

Final
C1	Punjab	223/4 (20 overs)
A2	Baroda	203/7 (20 overs)

=== Preliminary quarter-finals ===
1st Preliminary quarter-final
31 October 2023
Scorecard

Gujarat; 127/8 (20 overs)	v	Uttar Pradesh; 130/4 (18.4 overs)
Saurav Chauhan 32 (21); Bhuvneshwar Kumar 3/21 (4 overs)		Nitish Rana 71* (49); Ravi Bishnoi 2/29 (4 overs)

Uttar Pradesh won by 6 wickets
Inderjit Singh Bindra Stadium, Mohali
Umpires: Rohan Pandit and Saidharshan Kumar
Player of the match: Nitish Rana (Uttar Pradesh)

- Uttar Pradesh won the toss and elected to field.

2nd Preliminary quarter-final
31 October 2023
Scorecard

Bengal; 138/8 (20 overs)	v	Assam; 142/2 (17.5 overs)
Karan Lal 24 (20); Akash Sengupta 3/29 (4 overs)		Riyan Parag 50* (31); Mukesh Kumar 1/29 (4 overs)

Assam won by 8 wickets
Inderjit Singh Bindra Stadium, Mohali
Umpires: KN Ananthapadmanabhan and Saiyed Khalid
Player of the match: Riyan Parag

- Assam won the toss and elected to field.

=== Quarter-finals ===
1st Quarter-final
2 November 2023
Scorecard

Uttar Pradesh; 169/3 (20 overs)	v	Punjab; 174/5 (19.1 overs)
Rinku Singh 77 (33); Harpreet Brar 1/28 (4 overs)		Nehal Wadhera 52 (39); Mohsin Khan 3/34 (4 overs)

Punjab won by 5 wickets
Inderjit Singh Bindra Stadium, Mohali
Umpires: Saiyed Khalid and Rohan Pandit
Player of the match: Nehal Wadhera (Punjab)

- Punjab won the toss and elected to field.

2nd Quarter-final
2 November 2023
Scorecard

Kerala; 158/6 (20 overs)	v	Assam; 162/4 (17.1 overs)
Salman Nizar 57 (44); Akash Sengupta 3/29 (4 overs)		Sumit Ghadigaonkar 75 (50); Sijomon Joseph 2/17 (3 overs)

Assam won by 6 wickets
Inderjit Singh Bindra Stadium, Mohali
Umpires: Saiyed Khalid and Jayaraman Madanagopal
Player of the match: Sumit Ghadigaonkar (Assam)

- Assam won the toss and elected to field.

3rd Quarter-final
2 November 2023
Scorecard

Mumbai; 148/8 (20 overs)	v	Baroda; 149/7 (18.5 overs)
Shivam Dube 48 (36); Soyeb Sopariya 3/16 (4 overs)		Vishnu Solanki 49* (30); Mohit Avasthi 2/38 (4 overs)

Baroda won by 3 wickets
Maharaja Yadavindra Singh International Cricket Stadium, Mohali
Umpires: KN Ananthapadmanabhan and Saidharshan Kumar
Player of the match: Vishnu Solanki (Baroda)

- Baroda won the toss and elected to field.

4th Quarter-final
2 November 2023
Scorecard

Delhi; 176/6 (20 overs)	v	Vidarbha; 137/9 (20 overs)
Anuj Rawat 68 (53); Umesh Yadav 4/30 (4 overs)		Shubham Dubey 44 (34); Lalit Yadav 2/16 (4 overs)

Delhi won by 39 runs
Maharaja Yadavindra Singh International Cricket Stadium, Mohali
Umpires: KN Ananthapadmanabhan and Saidharshan Kumar
Player of the match: Anuj Rawat (Delhi)

- Vidarbha won the toss and elected to field.

=== Semi-finals ===
1st Semi-final
4 November 2023
Scorecard

Delhi; 183/7 (20 overs)	v	Punjab; 184/4 (18.4 overs)
Ayush Badoni 80 (57); Siddarth Kaul 3/27 (4 overs)		Abhishek Sharma 77 (45); Mayank Yadav 2/28 (4 overs)

Punjab won by 6 wickets
Inderjit Singh Bindra Stadium, Mohali
Umpires: Saiyed Khalid and Jayaraman Madanagopal
Player of the match: Abhishek Sharma (Punjab)

- Punjab won the toss and elected to field.

2nd Semi-final
4 November 2023
Scorecard

Assam; 142 (20 overs)	v	Baroda; 146/4 (16.1 overs)
Rishav Das 48 (41); Abhimanyusingh Rajput 4/29 (4 overs)		Ninad Rathva 44 (26); Akash Sengupta 2/32 (3.1 overs)

Baroda won by 6 wickets
Inderjit Singh Bindra Stadium, Mohali
Umpires: KN Ananthapadmanabhan and Saiyed Khalid
Player of the match: Abhimanyusingh Rajput (Baroda)

- Baroda won the toss and elected to field.

=== Final ===
Final
6 November 2023
16:30
Scorecard

Punjab; 223/4 (20 overs)	v	Baroda; 203/7 (20 overs)
Anmolpreet Singh 113 (61); Krunal Pandya 1/30 (4 overs)		Abhimanyusingh Rajput 61 (42); Arshdeep Singh 4/23 (4 overs)

Punjab won by 20 runs
Inderjit Singh Bindra Stadium, Mohali
Umpires: Jayaraman Madanagopal and Rohan Pandit
Player of the match: Anmolpreet Singh (Punjab)

- Baroda won the toss and elected to field.
