= Bhupen =

Bhupen is a given name. Notable people with the name include:

- Bhupen Baro, Indian politician
- Bhupen Kumar Borah (born 1970), Indian politician
- Bhupen Hazarika (1926–2011), Indian playback singer
- Bhupen Khakhar (1934–2003), Indian artist
- Bhupen Lalwani (born 1999), Indian cricketer
- Bhupen Mahapatra (born 1935), Odia novelist
