= Wajid =

Wajid may refer to:

- Al-Wājid (Arabic: الواجد), one of the names of God in Islam, meaning "Perceiver" or "Unfailing"
- Wajid (name), male given name of Arabic origin (includes a list of people with this name)

- Wajid, Indian film musician, one half of the duo Sajid–Wajid

- Wajid, Somalia (sometimes Waajid or Wajiid), city in the Bakool region of Somalia
  - Wajid District, Somalia
- Another name for wajik, a traditional Asian sweet

== See also ==
- Wajid Ali (disambiguation)
