= Wajid Ali =

Wajid Ali may refer to:

- Wajid Ali Shah (1822–1887), tenth and last Nawab of the Kingdom of Awadh (Oudh)
- Wajid Ali (Indian cricketer) (born 2000), Indian cricketer
- Wajid Ali (Pakistani cricketer) (born 1981), Pakistani cricketer
- Wajid Ali (musician singer), part of the Hindi music composer duo Sajid–Wajid
- Wajid Ali (kabaddi) (born 1984), Pakistani kabaddi player
- S. Wajid Ali (1890–1951), Bengali writer and nationalist
- Syed Wajid Ali (1911–2008), industrialist of Pakistan who is also known for his services to the Olympic Movement

== See also ==
- Wajid (name)
- Ali (disambiguation)
