= Association of Bihar Cricket =

Association of Bihar Cricket or ABC is a parallel cricket governing body for the cricket activities in the Bihar state of India. It is not recognized by the Board of Control for Cricket in India.

== History ==
It was formed in 2010 when BJP MP and former test cricketer Kirti Azad jumped into it with his own Association of Bihar Cricket. Azad has attacked Bihar Cricket Association chief Lalu Prasad Yadav accusing him of ruining cricket in the state by running the BCA in an arbitrary manner.

In July 2012, Association of Bihar Cricket had charged the Lalu Prasad Yadav-led Bihar Cricket Association of committing financial irregularities to the tune of INR5 million, which the BCCI had granted for development of the game in the state in 2008. The Bihar government had dissolved the BCA on grounds of irregularities in December 2008.

In October 2012, singer Manoj Tiwari was elected the President of Association of Bihar Cricket.

== Officials ==
- Manoj Tiwari - President
- Sabir Ali - Senior Vice-president
- Narendra Kumar Singh - Vice-president
- Anil Kumar Singh - Vice-president
- Nitin Kumar Yadav - Vice-president
- Mithilesh Tiwari - General Secretary
- Anand Dwivede - Treasurer

== See also ==
- Bihar Cricket Association
- Bihar cricket team
