= Waked =

Waked (Arabic: واكد) is an Arabic surname, a variant of Waqid or Wajid (Arabic: واقد), both meaning “brilliant” and/or “kindled”.

Notable people with the surname include:

- Abdullah Al-Waked (born 1975), Saudi Arabian footballer
- Amr Waked (born 1972), Egyptian actor
- Mohammed Al-Waked (born 1991), Saudi Arabian footballer
- Sharif Waked (born 1964), Palestinian artist
- Vinícius Waked (born 1987), Brazilian freestyle swimmer

== See also ==
- Wake (disambiguation)
