= Rahul Kumar (cricketer) =

Indian cricketer (born 2003)

Personal information
- Born: 14 October 2003 (age 23); Patna, India
- Bowling: Right-hand medium-fast
- Source: Cricinfo, 11 January 2021

Rahul Kumar (born 14 October 2003) is an Indian cricketer. He made his Twenty20 debut on 11 January 2021, for Bihar in the 2020–21 Syed Mushtaq Ali Trophy. He made his List A debut on 20 February 2021, for Bihar in the 2020–21 Vijay Hazare Trophy.
