= Navneet Virk =

Indian cricketer (born 1996)

Personal information
- Born: 23 October 1996 (age 30)
- Source: ESPNcricinfo, 9 December 2019

Navneet Virk (born 23 October 1996) is an Indian cricketer. He made his first-class debut on 9 December 2019, for Railways in the 2019–20 Ranji Trophy. He made his Twenty20 debut on 10 January 2021, for Railways in the 2020–21 Syed Mushtaq Ali Trophy.
