= Daljit Singh (cricketer, born 1940s) =

Indian cricketer (born c. 1940)

Personal information
- Born: 1941 or 1942 (age 84–85)
- Role: Wicket-keeper
- Relatives: Simone Singh (daughter)

Domestic team information
- Years: Team
- 1961/62–1964/65: Services
- 1963/64: Northern Punjab
- 1965/66: Delhi
- 1966/67–1978/79: Bihar

Career statistics
Competition	FC	List A
Matches	87	3
Runs scored	3,964	28
Batting average	32.76	14.00
100s/50s	7/19	0/0
Top score	145	27
Balls bowled	72	–
Wickets	1	–
Bowling average	59.00	–
5 wickets in innings	0	–
10 wickets in match	0	n/a
Best bowling	1/15	–
Catches/stumpings	157/68	4/0
- Source: ESPNcricinfo, 14 January 2016

Daljit Singh (born 1940 or 1941) is an Indian former first-class cricketer and pitch curator. He played for various teams during his career from 1961/62 to 1978/79. After his playing career, he became a pitch curator and chairman of the grounds and pitches committee of the Board of Control for Cricket in India.

== Life and career ==
Singh was a wicket-keeper batsman who appeared in 87 first-class and 3 List A matches. The teams he represented include Services, Northern Punjab, Delhi, Bihar, North Zone and East Zone. He was a prolific wicket-keeper and batsman, effecting more than 200 dismissals and scoring close to 4000 runs. He was working for the Indian Navy when he started his cricket career with Services. He played for Bihar for 12 seasons and also captained them to 1975–76 Ranji Trophy final.

Singh was employed with Tata Steel in Jamshedpur during his career with Bihar. He worked for one year at 10 Janpath, where he prepared a cricket pitch inside the residence of the Indian Prime Minister Lal Bahadur Shastri for Shastri's son who was interested in cricket. He worked for 22 years with Tata Steel as chief of community and rural development services, before being employed for three years in Bangalore by an NGO. During his stay in Bangalore he coached the likes of Rahul Dravid, Anil Kumble, Javagal Srinath and Venkatesh Prasad. He was then offered a coaching role with the Punjab team as well as a role with the under-construction stadium in Mohali by the Punjab Cricket Association (PCA) secretary I. S. Bindra.

He has been the curator of Mohali's PCA Stadium for over 20 years. He was a member of BCCI's first Pitch Committee that was formed in 1997. He worked as the chairman of the Board of Control for Cricket in India (BCCI) grounds and pitches committee but was sacked in December 2009 after an ODI at Delhi was called off with the match referee declaring the pitch "dangerous" and unsuitable for play. He became the chairman of BCCI's grounds and pitches committee again, and holds the position as of December 2015.
