= Hardik Tamore =

Indian cricketer (born 1997)

Personal information
- Full name: Hardik Jitendra Tamore
- Born: 20 October 1997 (age 29); Thane, Maharashtra, India
- Source: ESPNcricinfo, 11 January 2020

Hardik Tamore (born 20 October 1997) is an Indian cricketer. He made his first-class debut on 11 January 2020, for Mumbai in the 2019–20 Ranji Trophy. He made his Twenty20 debut on 19 January 2021, for Mumbai in the 2020–21 Syed Mushtaq Ali Trophy. He made his List A debut on 8 December 2021, for Mumbai in the 2021–22 Vijay Hazare Trophy.
