= 1975–76 Ranji Trophy =

1975-76 Ranji Trophy
- The Ranji Trophy, which the winners get.
- Administrator: BCCI
- Cricket format: First-class cricket
- Tournament format(s): League and knockout
- Champions: Bombay (26th title)
- Participants: 24
- Most runs: Yajurvindra Singh (Maharashtra) (583)
- Most wickets: Abdul Ismail (Bombay) (38)

The 1975–76 Ranji Trophy was the 42nd season of the Ranji Trophy. Bombay retained the title defeating Bihar.

== Highlights ==
- A 16 year old Kapil Dev made his first class debut for Haryana against Punjab taking 6 for 39 and 2 for 78.

== Group stage ==
=== West Zone ===
Team	Pld	W	L	D	T	NR	Pts	Q
Bombay	4	2	0	2	0	0	26	2.972
Maharashtra	4	0	0	4	0	0	16	1.003
Baroda	4	1	1	2	0	0	16	0.830
Saurashtra	4	1	1	2	0	0	14	0.692
Gujarat	4	0	2	2	0	0	8	0.750

=== South Zone ===
Team	Pld	W	L	D	T	NR	Pts	Q
Karnataka	4	2	0	2	0	0	25	1.752
Hyderabad	4	1	0	3	0	0	22	1.371
Tamil Nadu	4	1	0	2	0	1	18	1.603
Andhra	4	0	2	1	0	1	5	0.385
Kerala	4	0	2	0	0	2	4	0.332

=== Central Zone ===
Team	Pld	W	L	D	T	NR	Pts	Q
Rajasthan	4	2	0	2	0	0	26	1.816
Railways	4	0	0	4	0	0	18	1.224
Uttar Pradesh	4	1	1	2	0	0	17	1.169
Vidarbha	4	0	1	3	0	0	11	0.602
Madhya Pradesh	4	0	1	3	0	0	9	0.647

=== North Zone ===
Team	Pld	W	L	D	T	NR	Pts	Q
Delhi	4	3	0	1	0	0	30	5.348
Haryana	4	3	1	0	0	0	25	1.500
Services	4	1	1	2	0	0	15	0.714
Punjab	4	0	2	2	0	0	10	0.653
Jammu and Kashmir	4	0	3	1	0	0	3	0.376

=== East Zone ===
Team	Pld	W	L	D	T	NR	Pts	Q
Bengal	3	2	0	1	0	0	22	4.714
Bihar	3	2	0	1	0	0	20	1.416
Orissa	3	1	2	0	0	0	8	0.614
Assam	3	0	3	0	0	0	0	0.309

== Knockout stage ==
Pre-Quarter-finals
9 Jan 1976 — Jaipur
Rajasthan	279 & 157/6
Maharashtra	286
9 Jan 1976 — Hyderabad
Hyderabad	50/8d & 376/8d
Railways	279 & 76

Quarter-finals
8 Jan 1976 — Delhi
Delhi	334 & 108
Bihar	392 & 207
17 Jan 1976 — Bangalore
Karnataka	465 & 296/6d
Maharashtra	444 & 56/2
8 Jan 1976 — Calcutta
Bengal	205
Haryana	135 & 66
16 Jan 1976 — Bombay
Bombay	222 & 275/4d
Hyderabad	281 & 146

Semi-finals
25 Jan 1976 — Jamshedpur
Bihar	394 & 35/0
Karnataka	157 & 268
30 Jan 1976 — Calcutta
Bengal	310 & 159/2d
Bombay	329 & 54/2

Finals
15 Feb 1976 — Jamshedpur
Bihar	161 & 240
Bombay	352 & 50/0

=== Final ===
15–19 February 1976
Scorecard

Bihar (H)	v	Bombay
161 (72.2 overs); Sumit Shome 34; Abdul Ismail 5/48		352 (121 overs); Ashok Mankad 98; Sekhar Sinha 4/117
240 (102 overs); Daljit Singh 87; Abdul Ismail 5/58		50/0 (11.4 overs); Ramnath Parkar 31*

Bombay won by 10 wickets
Keenan Stadium, Jamshedpur
Umpires: Mohammad Ghouse and B. Satyaji Rao

- Bihar won the toss and decided to bat

== Scorecards and averages ==
- CricketArchive
