= Abdul Ismail =

Indian cricketer (1945–2025)

Personal information
- Full name: Abdul Moosabhoy Ismail
- Born: 20 August 1945; Bombay, Bombay Province, British India
- Died: 30 May 2025 (aged 79); Mumbai, Maharashtra, India
- Batting: Right-handed
- Bowling: Right-arm fast-medium
- Role: Bowler
- Relatives: Asif Ismail (son)

Domestic team information
- Years: Team
- 1969/70–1977/78: Bombay

Career statistics
Competition	FC	List A
Matches	75	5
Runs scored	848	1
Batting average	18.43	0.50
100s/50s	0/0	0/0
Top score	46	1
Balls bowled	11,361	306
Wickets	244	5
Bowling average	18.04	31.60
5 wickets in innings	13	0
10 wickets in match	3	n/a
Best bowling	7/26	3/39
Catches/stumpings	23/–	2/–
- Source: ESPNcricinfo, 4 January 2016

Abdul Moosabhoy Ismail (10 August 1945 – 30 May 2025) was an Indian first-class cricketer who later became a selector for the Mumbai Cricket Association. Ismail played as a swing bowler for Bombay cricket team from 1969/70 to 1977/78.

== Career ==
A right-arm fast-medium bowler, Ismail played for Bombay between the 1969/70 and 1977/78 seasons. In his first match of the 1971–72 Ranji Trophy against Gujarat, Ismail had figures of 3/15 and 6/16, giving his team an innings win within two days. Later that season, Bombay registered a 284-run win in away game against Baroda, with Ismail taking 4/18 and 5/62, with Baroda being bowled out for 42 in their first innings. He finished the 1971/72 season with 56 wickets at an average of 13.98.

He found success in the 1975–76 Ranji Trophy in which he finished as the leading wicket-taker with 38 scalps at an average of 16. In the final of that Ranji season against Bihar, he took 5/48 and 5/58, helping his team to a 10-wicket victory.

In 2000, Ismail became a member of Mumbai Cricket Association the Ranji and under-22 selection panel. He worked in that position for many years.

== Playing style ==
Ismail was a right-arm fast-medium new ball bowler with a "deceptive action", who could swing the ball both ways. About Ismail's bowling, former Mumbai captain Milind Rege said, "I found his action very awkward, completely open-chested, something like Colin Croft. He had the biggest outswing I have ever seen. He started from around the leg stump and the swing would finish at 1st slip. [...] Surely Abdul was a great bowler who should have played many a Test [...]"

According to former India cricketer Brijesh Patel, "Ismail was a very good bowler deceptive with his weird action. With both his swings, he made the batsmen play. Mind you, the quality of balls used was poor those days and it would lose its shine, but Abdul would be at you all the time. He should have played for the country."

== Personal life and death ==
Ismail, son of a taxi driver, was supported to play cricket by a Kerkar family. Ismail said of his early life, "What I am today is because of the Kerkar family. They really took care of me. We had no money. My father was the only earning member and he used to get annoyed seeing me on the ground. Everyday I would go to banks and offices and beg for a job."

Ismail's son Asif Ismail is a tennis player who has appeared in the Davis Cup.

Ismail died from a cardiac arrest on 30 May 2025, at the age of 79.
