= Bihar Cricket Association =

Cricket Organization in Bihar State, India

- बिहार क्रिकेट संघ
- Sport: Cricket
- Jurisdiction: Bihar
- Abbreviation: BCA
- Founded: 1935
- Affiliation: BCCI
- Affiliation date: 2008
- Regional affiliation: East Zone
- Headquarters: 45-C, Near Sahyog Hospital, Patliputra Colony
- Location: Patna
- President: Harsh Vardhan
- CEO: Manish Raj
- Coach: Vikash Kumar

Official website
- biharcricketassociation.com
- (India)

Bihar Cricket Association (BCA) is the governing body of cricket activities in the Bihar state of India and the Bihar cricket team. It is affiliated to the Board of Control for Cricket in India as full member. BCA was founded in 1935. Supreme Court of India-appointed Committee of Administrators (CoA) approved BCA as the authorised body for organizing cricket in Bihar.Currently it's best bowler with the most wickets is Md.Mushfique Uddin from Khagaria district with 38 wickets in a season

== Administration ==
Executive Council
| S. No. | Member | Designation |
|---|---|---|
| 1. | Harsh Vardhan | President |
| 2. | Priya Kumari | Vice-president |
| 3. | Ziaul Arefin | Secretary |
| 4. | Rohit Kumar | Joint-secretary |
| 5. | Sri Abhishek Nandan | Treasurer |
| 6. | Sunil Kumar | Players Representative,(Male) |
| 7. | Shikha Soniya | Players Representative,(Female) |
| 8. | Rajesh Kumar | District Association Representative |
| 9. | Ajay Kumar Jha | Accountants General of Bihar Nominee |

== Selection committees ==
=== Junior Men's selection committee ===
- Satya Prakash Krishna
- Kundan Kumar
- Prabhat Kumar

=== Women's selection committee ===
- Lovely Raj
- Neetu Singh
- Ritu Raj Sharma

== BCA Presidents ==
| S. No. | Name | Tenure |
|---|---|---|
| 1. | A.M.Hayman | 1935–40 |
| 2. | K.A.D.Naoroji | 1940–43 |
| 3. | J.M.Rakshit | 1943–46 |
| 4. | P.H.Kutar | 1946–60 |
| 5. | R.Bowyer | 1960–66 |
| 6. | R.H.Mody | 1966–71 |
| 7. | H.P.Bodhanwalla | 1971–74 |
| 8. | R.K.Bhasin | 1974–76 |
| 9. | H.P.Bodhanwalla | 1976–83 |
| 10. | Dr. J.J.Irani | 1983–87 |
| 11. | Prem Sagar | 1987–90 |
| 12. | Randhir Prasad Verma | 1990–91 |
| 13. | A.Mathias | 1991–93 |
| 14. | Arun Narayan Singh | 1993–99 |
| 15. | Sanjay Singh | 1999–2002 |
| 16. | Gopal Bohra | 2017–2019 |
| 17. | Rakesh Kumar Tiwari | 2019–2025 |
| 18. | Harsh Vardhan | 2025–present |

== District Associations ==
FULL MEMBERS OF BIHAR DISTRICT CRICKET ASSOCIATION
| No. | District | Governing Body | Established | official Website |
|---|---|---|---|---|
Western zone 1
| 1 | East Champaran | East Champaran District Cricket Association | | |
| 2 | West Champaran | West Champaran District Cricket Association | | |
| 3 | Gopalganj | Gopalganj District Cricket Association | | |
| 4 | Saran | Saran District Cricket Association | | |
| 5 | Siwan | Siwan District Cricket Association | | |
Mithila Zone 2
| 6 | Darbhanga | Darbhanga District Cricket Association | 1975 | |
| 7 | Muzaffarpur | Muzaffarpur District Cricket Association | 1983-84 | |
| 8 | Madhubani | Madhubani District Cricket Association | 1978 | |
| 9 | Sheohar | Sheohar District Cricket Association | | |
| 10 | Sitamarhi | Sitamarhi District Cricket Association | 1984-85 | |
Shahabad zone 1
| 11 | Buxar | Buxar District Cricket Association | 1992-93 | |
| 12 | Bhojpur | Bhojpur District Cricket Association | 1987-88 | |
| 13 | Rohtas | Rohtas District Cricket Association | | |
| 14 | Kaimur | Kaimur District Cricket Association | | |
| 15 | Aurangabad | Aurangabad District Cricket Association | | |
Angika zone 1
| 16 | Bhagalpur | Bhagalpur Cricket Association | 1990-91 | |
| 17 | Munger | Munger District Cricket Association | 1980-81 | |
| 18 | Banka | Banka District Cricket Association | | |
| 19 | Jamui | Jamui District Cricket Association | | |
| 20 | Lakhisarai | Lakhisarai District Cricket Association | | |
Central zone 1
| 21 | Begusarai | Begusarai District Cricket Association | | |
| 22 | Khagaria | Khagaria District Cricket Association | | |
| 23 | Samastipur | Samastipur District Cricket Association | | |
| 24 | Supaul | Supaul District Cricket Association | | |
| 25 | Saharsa | Saharsa District Cricket Association | 1974 | |
Seemanchal zone 1
| 26 | Kishanganj | Kishanganj District Cricket Association | | |
| 27 | Katihar | Katihar District Cricket Association | 1984 | |
| 28 | Madhepura | Madhepura District Cricket Association | | |
| 29 | Araria | Araria District Cricket Association | 1991 | |
| 30 | Purnia | Purnea District Cricket Association | 1980 | |
Magadh zone 1
| 31 | Gaya | Gaya District Cricket Association | 1986-87 | |
| 32 | Nalanda | Nalanda District Cricket Association | | |
| 33 | Nawada | Nawada District Cricket Association | | |
| 34 | Sheikhpura | Sheikhpura District Cricket Association | | |
Patliputra zone 1
| 35 | Patna | Patna District Cricket Association | 1972 | |
| 36 | Jehanabad | Jehanabad District Cricket Association | | |
| 37 | Arwal | Arwal District Cricket Association | 2002-03 | |
| 38 | Vaishali | Vaishali District Cricket Association | 2001-02 | |

== Home Grounds ==
| Name | City | State | First used | Last used | Notes |
|---|---|---|---|---|---|
| Rajgir International Cricket Stadium | Rajgir | Bihar | 2026 | - | Only Pavilions Constructed |
| Moin-ul-Haq Stadium | Patna | Bihar | 1970 | 2026 | Hosted three ODIs |
| Urja Stadium | Patna | Bihar | 2017 | 2021 | |

== Official tournaments ==
1. Men’s & Women’s Senior Tournament

MEN'S SENIOR ONE DAY TROPHY

BIHAR T10 CRICKET LEAGUE 2026Bihar T10 league

MEN'S T-20 TROPHY

2. Men’s & Women’s Under-23 Tournament

MEN'S UNDER-23 ONE DAY TROPHY

3. Men’s & Women’s Under-19 Tournament

RANDHIR VERMA UNDER-19 ONE DAY TROPHY

4. Boys Under-16 Tournament

SHAYAMAL SINHA UNDER-16 ONE DAY TROPHY

5. Girls Under-15 Tournament

=== Hayman Trophy ===
The Hayman Trophy is an inter-district senior men's tournament organised by the BCA. It is named after A. M. Hayman, BCA's founding president.

- Hayman Trophy A Division

| Year | Winner | Runner-up | Final Host | Note |
|---|---|---|---|---|
| 2013-14 | Bhagalpur | Muzaffarpur | - | |

- Hayman Trophy B Division

| Year | Winner | Runner-up | Final Host | Note |
|---|---|---|---|---|
| 2013-14 | Patna | Purnea | - | - |
| 2014-15 | - | - | - | - |
| 2015-16 | Purnea | Siwan | - | - |
| 2016-17 | Bhojpur | Nalanda | - | - |
| 2017-18 | - | - | - | - |
| 2018-19 | - | - | - | - |

=== Randhir Verma Under-19 Trophy ===
Randhir Verma Under-19 Bihar Championship is a One day cricket tournament played between the district cricket teams in the Indian state of Bihar, organised by Bihar Cricket Association. The tournament is recognised by the Board of Control for Cricket in India. The cricket tournament is organized at five Zonal centres. In the year 2018, the tournament was organized at Arwal. Before Partition of Bihar the region currently known as Jharkhand played the tournament under BCA. Following statehood, Jharkhand State Cricket Association (JSCA) also conducts matches for its own districts under the title Randhir Verma trophy.

==== Venue ====
The matches of the south zone was played at Bhabhua in Kaimur district. The matches of the east zone were played at Sri Krishna Sah stadium in Jamui, Jamui district, Dakbangla grounds at Sonpur

=== Shaymal Sinha U-16 Bihar Championship ===
- Shaymal Sinha U-16 Bihar Championship

| Year | Winner | Runner-up |
|---|---|---|
| 2013-14 | Bhagalpur | Siwan |
| 2014-15 | Purnea | Jamui |
| 2015-16 | Bhojpur | Muzaffarpur |
| 2016-17 | Patna | Siwan |

== BCA approved tournaments ==
- 2021 Bihar Cricket League T20 (BCL 2021)

== Courts' directives on affiliation ==
Cricket should be kept free from politics and the game should not become a ball for politicians, the Supreme Court of India observed on 25 November 2012. The remarks were made by the bench during the hearing of a petition relating to the ongoing dispute between two rival associations of cricket in Bihar for running the administration of the sport in the state. Patna High Court has directed Board of Cricket Control in India, BCCI in July 2012 to include Bihar in various National Level Cricket Tournaments. Patna High Court on 20 September 2011 allowed CAB, rival Bihar Cricket Association (BCA) faction headed by Binod Kumar to operate its account with a nationalised bank. Patna High court in November 2011, directed the state government to file an intervener petition in a case related to the Bihar Cricket Association.The government's counsel, AAG 1 Lalit Kishore, told the court that both the factions of BCA, one headed by RJD supremo Lalu Prasad and the other by Binod Kumar, have not made government a party in the petition. Bombay High Court in December 2010 held that "the present petitioner (CAB) never claimed to be successor of BCA Patna (which represented Bihar in BCCI before bifurcation) and BCA Patna has already given up its challenge to the recommendations of the committee that JSCA is the changed name of BCA (1935). It is, therefore, necessary for the petitioner to apply for an affiliate membership at the first instance and then seek promotion as an associate member and thereafter full member. The Rules and Regulations are binding and the BCCI must follow the said Rules"

== BCA timeline ==
- 18 March 2001: SGM of BCA, 1935 held at Jamshedpur; Jharkhand State Cricket Association for Jharkhand and Bihar Cricket Association for Bihar formed;
- 20 May 2001: Lalu Prasad Yadav elected BCA president;
- 29 September 2001: BCCI led by A. C. Muthiah grants Full membership to BCA;
- 30 September 2001: Jagmohan Dalmiya elected BCCI president, disaffiliates BCA led by Lalu Prasad Yadav, grants Full membership to Jharkhand State Cricket Association.
- 27 September 2008: BCCI, in its AGM, grants associate membership to BCA, Patna;
- October 2009: BCCI grants Rs. 50 lakh to BCA for infrastructure development and cricketing activities; no funding in November 2010 and December 2011 due to alleged financial bungling and litigation
- 3 April 2010: BCA elections, scheduled to be held on 4 April, postponed by the electoral officer and retired Patna High Court judge after complaints about voters' list and issuance of notice
- 30 June 2010: Managing Committee dissolved and a 13-member ad hoc committee formed; decided to hold elections within six months
- 21 August 2010: BCA secretary Ajay Narayan Sharma suspended from ad hoc committee
- 12 September 2010: Ajay Narayan Sharma faction claims to have held SGM and AGM and constituted a Managing Committee at the instance of 1/3rd of the members, supersedes ad hoc committee
- 20 September 2011: Single judge of Patna HC holds legal the AGM of Sept 12, 2010; LPA (1713/2011) filed in division bench of Patna HC challenging the legality of the single judge decision
- 2 February 2012: Diverse opinion; matter referred to Full Bench of Patna High Court
- 10 July 2013: Patna High Court allows Sharma to operate BCA account
- 29 November 2013: Special Leave Petition filed in SC, notices sent 44 respondents. SC appointed Retd. High Court Judge to hold election.
- Election held on 23 Sept. 2015 in which both faction of BCA participated.
- September 2015: Abdul Bari Siddiqui was elected BCA president
- 18 July 2016: Became full member of BCCI as Supreme Court approved recommendations of the RM Lodha Committee
- 4 January 2018: Supreme Court directed BCCI to allow Bihar Cricket Association to participate in Ranji Trophy & other BCCI Tournament as Bihar cricket team from 2018.

The Association of Bihar Cricket and Cricket Association of Bihar on 11 July 2012 charged the Lalu Prasad Yadav-led Bihar Cricket Association of committing financial irregularities to the tune of ₹ 5 million, which the BCCI had granted for development of the game in the state in 2008. The Bihar government had dissolved the BCA on grounds of irregularities in December 2008.

== See also ==
- Bihar cricket team
- Ranji Trophy
