= Urja Stadium =

Cricket stadium

- Interactive map of Urja Stadium
- Location: BSEB Colony, Rajbansi Nagar, Patna, Bihar, India
- Country: India
- Coordinates: 25°59′02″N 80°10′42″E
- Establishment: 2018
- Capacity: 5,000
- Owner: Bihar Cricket Association
- Operator: Bihar Cricket Association
- Tenants: Bihar cricket team
- As of 07 January 2024; Source: Urja Stadium, Cricinfo

Urja Stadium is located in Rajbansi Nagar, Patna, Bihar, India. This stadium is known for hosting Ranji Trophy matches. This Stadium Hosts Cricket and Football.

== See also ==
- Rajgir International Cricket Stadium
- Moin-ul-Haq Stadium
