= Harshit Rathod =

Indian cricketer (born 1998)

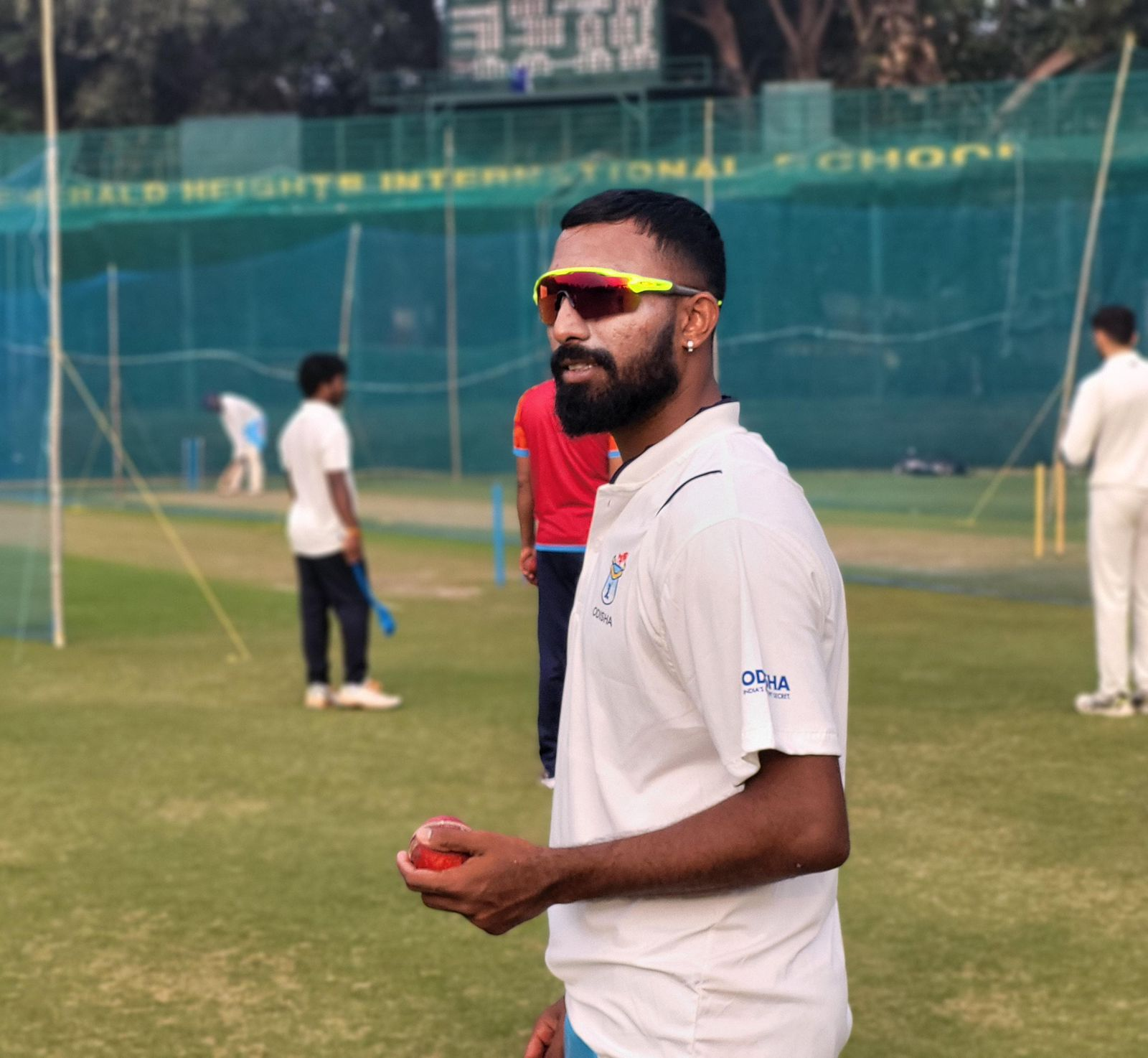

Personal information
- Full name: Harshit Rathod
- Born: 3 August 1998 (age 28); Bhadrak, Odisha, India
- Batting: Right-handed
- Bowling: Left-arm Spinner

Domestic team information
- Years: Team
- 2024: Odisha
- Source: ESPNcricinfo, 24 February 2021

Harshit Rathod (born 3 August 1998) is an Indian cricketer. He made his List A debut on 24 February 2021, for Odisha in the 2020–21 Vijay Hazare Trophy. He made his Twenty20 debut on 9 November 2021, for Odisha in the 2021–22 Syed Mushtaq Ali Trophy. He made his Ranji Trophy debut, Group B: Odisha v Madhya Pradesh at Indore on 13 January 2024.

== Early and personal life ==
He was born on 3 August 1998 in Bhadrak District, Odisha, He was born in a Gujarati family. He has a younger sister. He started his coaching in Vijaya Bhanu Memorial Cricket Academy, Charampa, Bhadrak, under K.V Prasad. Harshit attended the Happy Home school, Bhadrak and the BNMA College in Bhadrak.
