= Karunakaran Mukunth =

Indian cricketer (born 1996)

Personal information
- Born: 6 February 1996 (age 30)
- Source: ESPNcricinfo, 17 December 2019

Karunakaran Mukunth (born 6 February 1996) is an Indian cricketer. He made his first-class debut on 17 December 2019, for Tamil Nadu in the 2019–20 Ranji Trophy.
