= Kumar Rajnish =

Indian cricketer (born 1993)

Personal information
- Born: 28 December 1993 (age 32); Patna, Bihar, India
- Batting: Right-handed
- Bowling: Right arm off break

Domestic team information
- Years: Team
- 2018-present: Bihar
- Source: ESPNcricinfo, 1 November 2018

Kumar Rajnish (born 28 December 1993) is an Indian cricketer. He made his first-class debut for Bihar against Uttarakhand in the 2018–19 Ranji Trophy on 1 November 2018. He made his Twenty20 debut on 5 November 2021, for Bihar in the 2021–22 Syed Mushtaq Ali Trophy. He made his List A debut on 14 December 2021, for Bihar in the 2021–22 Vijay Hazare Trophy.
