= Piyush Singh =

Indian cricketer (born 2001)

Personal information
- Born: 4 May 2001 (age 25)
- Source: Cricinfo, 24 February 2019

Piyush Singh (born 4 May 2001) is an Indian cricketer. He made his Twenty20 debut for Bihar in the 2018–19 Syed Mushtaq Ali Trophy on 24 February 2019.
