= Sourav Kanojia =

Indian cricketer (born 1997)

Personal information
- Born: 22 February 1997 (age 29); New Delhi
- Source: Cricinfo, 20 February 2021

Sourav Kanojia (born 22 February 1997) is an Indian cricketer. He made his List A debut on 20 February 2021, for Odisha in the 2020–21 Vijay Hazare Trophy.
