= Shashank Attarde =

Indian cricketer (born 1991)

Personal information
- Full name: Shashank Vinayak Attarde
- Born: 4 November 1991 (age 35); Jalgaon, Maharashtra, India
- Batting: Right-handed
- Bowling: Right-arm offbreak

Domestic team information
- Years: Team
- 2019/20: Mumbai
- Source: Cricinfo, 10 October 2019

Shashank Attarde (born 4 November 1991) is an Indian cricketer. He made his List A debut on 8 October 2019, for Mumbai in the 2019–20 Vijay Hazare Trophy. He made his first-class debut on 9 December 2019, for Mumbai in the 2019–20 Ranji Trophy.
