= Vinod Sharma =

Indian cricketer (born 1946)

Personal information
- Born: 9 April 1946 (age 80)
- Source: Cricinfo, 8 December 2019

Vinod Sharma (born 9 April 1946) is an Indian former cricketer. He played in 40 first-class matches between 1964 and 1979. He is now an umpire, and stood in a match in the opening round of the 2019–20 Ranji Trophy.
