= Dinesh Mor =

Indian cricketer (born 1995)

Personal information
- Born: 10 October 1995 (age 31); Delhi, India
- Source: ESPNcricinfo, 25 September 2019

Dinesh Mor (born 10 October 1995) is an Indian cricketer. He made his List A debut on 25 September 2019, for Railways in the 2019–20 Vijay Hazare Trophy. He made his Twenty20 debut on 8 November 2019, for Railways in the 2019–20 Syed Mushtaq Ali Trophy. He made his first-class debut on 9 December 2019, for Railways in the 2019–20 Ranji Trophy.
