= Prateek Jain =

Indian cricketer (born 1994)

Personal information
- Born: 10 October 1994 (age 32)
- Source: Cricinfo, 14 December 2018

Prateek Jain (born 10 October 1994) is an Indian cricketer. He made his first-class debut for Karnataka in the 2018–19 Ranji Trophy on 14 December 2018. He made his List A debut on 25 October 2019, for Karnataka in the final of the 2019–20 Vijay Hazare Trophy. He made his Twenty20 debut on 9 November 2019, for Karnataka in the 2019–20 Syed Mushtaq Ali Trophy.
