= Bhupen Mahapatra =

Indian writer

- Born: 3 August 1935; Jaleswar, Odisha
- Education: M.A.
- Alma mater: Utkal University
- Occupations: Novelist, Translator
- Parent: Krittibas Das Mahapatra (father)
- Awards: Sarala Samman, Fakir Mohan Samman, Mayadhar Samman

Bhupen Mahapatra (born 3 August 1935) is an Odia novelist, columnist, and short story writer.

== Early life and career ==
Mahapatra was born on 3 August 1935 in village Kotasahi of Jaleswar in Odisha. His father was Krittibas Das Mahapatra; his mother's name was Kshemankari. He started writing short stories in Odia during his young days and graduated to novels and travelogues. After studies, he worked with the Central Industrial Security Force, from where he retired as a Deputy Commandant.

== Literary career ==
Mahapatra has written four novels, 11 collections of short stories, two travelogues, three collections of essays, besides numerous works of translation.

== Journalism ==
Mahapatra has been active in journalism throughout his literary career. He has written regularly in various Odia journals like The Samaja, Sambad, Samaya and The Pragativadi etc. Three collections of his journalistic writings have been published.

== Literary administration ==
Despite his considerable literary output, Mahapatra is better known as an organiser of literary events and administrator of literary societies. He has been a President of Odisha Cultural Academy and vice president of Odisha Research Circle. He was the founding general secretary of the Madras Utkal Association.

== Bhupen Mahapatra in Translation ==
Mahapatra's short stories have been translated into English, Hindi, Telugu, Malayalam, Assamese, Kannada, Bengali, Malayalam and Rajasthani languages. His critically acclaimed short story M. K. Gandhi has been included in the English syllabus of North Maharashtra University and other Indian universities.

== Awards ==
- Saurabhashree Samman, Odisha
- Kalashree Award for Theatre
- Adikavi Sarala Samman, Odisha
- Fakir Mohan Sahitya Parishad Award
- Mayadhar Mansingh Samman
- Durmukha Award for Satirical Writing
- Pratibha Samman, Odisha
- Sulekha Special Literary Award, Puri, Odisha

== Bibliography ==
- Prithivi O Pruthivi (World & the World), published by Odisha Book Store, Cuttack (1986)
- Gotie Mendhapala (A Flock of Sheep), published by Parijat Press, Rourkela (1991)
- Upatyakaara Upakatha (Story of the Valley), published by Writers Workshop (1996)
- Bharata Bhagya Vidhata (Dispenser of India's Destiny), published by Swasti (1997)
- Lu Tatha Anya Kahaaniyan (Loo & Other Stories), Nirmana Prakashan, Delhi (2001)
- Fossil (Novel), published by Paschima, Bhubaneswar (2007)
