= Faisal Fanoos =

Indian cricketer (born 1997)

Personal information
- Born: 6 October 1997 (age 29)
- Batting: Right-handed
- Bowling: Right-arm medium-fast
- Source: ESPNcricinfo, 28 February 2021

Faisal Fanoos (born 6 October 1997) is an Indian cricketer. He made his List A debut on 28 February 2021, for Kerala in the 2020–21 Vijay Hazare Trophy.
