= Parth Kohli =

Indian cricketer (born 1996)

Personal information
- Full name: Parth Sachin Kohli
- Born: 9 August 1996 (age 30); Vadodara, Gujarat, India
- Source: Cricinfo, 12 February 2020

Parth Kohli (born 9 August 1996) is an Indian cricketer. He made his first-class debut on 12 February 2020, for Baroda in the 2019–20 Ranji Trophy. He made his Twenty20 debut on 5 November 2021, for Baroda in the 2021–22 Syed Mushtaq Ali Trophy.
