= Abhimanyusingh Rajput =

Indian cricketer (born 1998)

Abhimanyu Singh Rajput
Personal information
- Full name: Abhimanyusingh Vikramsingh Rajput
- Born: 9 May 1998 (age 28)
- Source: ESPNcricinfo, 21 February 2021

Abhimanyusingh Vikramsingh Rajput (born 9 May 1998) is an Indian cricketer. He made his List A debut on 7 October 2019, for Baroda in the 2019–20 Vijay Hazare Trophy. He made his first-class debut on 9 December 2019, for Baroda in the 2019–20 Ranji Trophy. In his second Ranji Trophy match, he hit the winning runs against Madhya Pradesh to lead his team to a rare one-wicket victory.

Singh made his Twenty20 debut on 10 January 2021, for Baroda in the 2020–21 Syed Mushtaq Ali Trophy.
