= Shivam Sharma (cricketer, born 1995) =

Indian cricketer (born 1995)

Personal information
- Born: 14 November 1995 (age 30); Moradabad, Uttar Pradesh, India
- Batting: Right-handed
- Bowling: Slow left arm orthodox
- Role: Bowler

Domestic team information
- Years: Team
- 2021–present: Uttar Pradesh
- Source: Cricinfo, 20 February 2021

Shivam Sharma (born 14 November 1995) is an Indian cricketer. He made his List A debut on 20 February 2021, for Uttar Pradesh in the 2020–21 Vijay Hazare Trophy. He made his Twenty20 debut on 4 November 2021, for Uttar Pradesh in the 2021–22 Syed Mushtaq Ali Trophy.
