= Saurabh Singh (cricketer) =

Indian cricketer (born 1997)

Personal information
- Born: 11 October 1997 (age 29); Barabanki, Uttar Pradesh, India
- Batting: Right-handed
- Bowling: Right arm medium
- Role: Batsman
- Source: Cricinfo, 6 March 2017

Saurabh Singh (born 11 October 1997) is an Indian cricketer. He made his List A debut for Bengal in the 2016–17 Vijay Hazare Trophy on 6 March 2017. He made his first-class debut on 11 January 2020, for Railways in the 2019–20 Ranji Trophy.
