= Rojith Ganesh =

Indian cricketer

Personal information
- Full name: Rojith Kalliparambil Ganesh
- Born: 13 November 1993 (age 32); Wadakkanchery, Kerala, India
- Batting: Right-handed
- Bowling: Right-arm legbreak
- Role: All-rounder

Domestic team information
- Years: Team
- 2021–present: Kerala

Career statistics
Competition	LA	T20
Matches	2	3
Runs scored	10	17
Batting average	10.00	8.50
100s/50s	0/0	0/0
Top score	6*	9*
Balls bowled	12	6
Wickets	0	0
Bowling average	-	-
5 wickets in innings	0	0
10 wickets in match	0	0
Best bowling	-	-
Catches/stumpings	3/0	0/0
- Source: Cricinfo, 16 November 2021

Rojith Kalliparambil Ganesh (born 13 November 1993) is an Indian cricketer who represents Kerala in domestic cricket. He is an allrounder who bats right-handed and bowls right-arm legspin.

== Early life ==
Rojith was born on 13 November 1993 in Wadakkanchery of Thrissur district of Kerala. He started his career as a tennis-ball cricketer. He has trained in Athreya Cricket Academy in Thrissur and South Zone Kottarakara CC and then went on to play for Sree Kerala Varma College, Thrissur.

== Domestic career ==
In December 2020, Rojith earned his maiden Kerala call-up as he was included in the Kerala squad for playing the 2020-21 Syed Mushtaq Ali Trophy based on his performances for Athreya and South Zone in state-level and national-level tournaments. Though, he did not get a chance to play in the tournament.

He made his List A debut for Kerala on 22 February 2021 against Uttar Pradesh in the 2020-21 Vijay Hazare Trophy. He played only 2 matches in the tournament and had a forgettable season scoring just 10 runs and didn't take a single wicket.

He was part of the title-winning KCA Royals of the 2020-21 season of KCA President's Cup T20. His performance in the tournament led to Mumbai Indians signing him as a reserve player ahead of the 2021 Indian Premier League.

He made his Twenty20 debut on 4 November 2021, for Kerala in the 2021–22 Syed Mushtaq Ali Trophy.
