= Wajid Ali (Indian cricketer) =

Indian cricketer (born 2000)

Personal information
- Born: 1 September 2000 (age 26)
- Source: Cricinfo, 11 January 2020

Wajid Ali (born 1 September 2000) is an Indian cricketer. He made his first-class debut on 11 January 2020, for Uttar Pradesh in the 2019–20 Ranji Trophy.
