= Soyeb Sopariya =

Indian cricketer (born 1994)

Personal information
- Full name: Soyeb Ibrahim Sopariya
- Born: 10 September 1994 (age 32); Mesrad, Gujarat, India
- Source: Cricinfo, 10 October 2019

Soyeb Sopariya (born 10 September 1994) is an Indian cricketer. He made his List A debut on 10 October 2019, for Baroda in the 2019–20 Vijay Hazare Trophy. He made his first-class debut on 9 December 2019, for Baroda in the 2019–20 Ranji Trophy.
