= Suraj Kashyap =

Indian cricketer (born 2003)

Personal information
- Full name: Suraj Kumar Kashyap
- Born: 14 August 2003 (age 23); Jehanabad, Bihar, India
- Batting: Right-handed
- Bowling: Right-arm off break
- Role: Bowler
- Source: Cricinfo, 27 January 2021

Suraj Kashyap (born 14 August 2003) is an Indian cricketer. He made his Twenty20 debut on 27 January 2021, for Bihar in the quarter-finals of the 2020–21 Syed Mushtaq Ali Trophy. He made his List A debut on 24 February 2021, for Bihar in the 2020–21 Vijay Hazare Trophy.
