= T Pradeep =

Indian cricketer (born 1994)

Personal information
- Full name: Thippeswamy Pradeep
- Born: 29 November 1994 (age 31)
- Batting: Right-handed
- Bowling: Right-arm fast-medium

Domestic team information
- Years: Team
- 2016-2019: Karnataka
- 2019-present: Railways
- Source: ESPNcricinfo, 29 October 2022

T Pradeep (born 29 November 1994) is an Indian cricketer. He made his Twenty20 debut for Karnataka in the 2016–17 Inter State Twenty-20 Tournament on 31 January 2017. He made his List A debut for Karnataka in the 2016–17 Vijay Hazare Trophy on 25 February 2017. He made his first-class debut on 9 December 2019, for Railways in the 2019–20 Ranji Trophy.
