= Bhupen Lalwani =

Indian cricketer (born 1999)

Personal information
- Full name: Bhupen Bhagwandas Lalwani
- Born: 7 April 1999 (age 27)
- Source: ESPNcricinfo, 11 January 2020

Bhupen Lalwani (born 7 April 1999) is an Indian cricketer. He made his first-class debut on 11 January 2020, for Mumbai in the 2019–20 Ranji Trophy.
