= Kedar Devdhar =

Indian cricketer (born 1989)

Personal information
- Full name: Kedar Hemant Devdhar
- Born: 14 December 1989 (age 36); Vadodara, Gujarat, India
- Batting: Right-handed
- Role: Batsman
- Relatives: Mrunal Devdhar (brother)

Domestic team information
- Years: Team
- 2008–present: Baroda
- 2011: Deccan Chargers

Career statistics
| Competition | FC | LA | T20 |
|---|---|---|---|
| Matches | 67 | 71 | 76 |
| Runs scored | 4009 | 2373 | 2215 |
| Batting average | 39.33 | 33.42 | 32.10 |
| 100s/50s | 10/18 | 6/11 | 1/13 |
| Top score | 226 | 148 | 100 |
| Catches/stumpings | 51/0 | 23/1 | 2/1 |
- Source: ESPNcricinfo, 24 February 2021

Kedar Hemant Devdhar (born 14 December 1989) is an Indian cricketer. He is a wicketkeeper-batsman who currently plays in Indian domestic cricket for Baroda. He was also a part of the now defunct Deccan Chargers in the Indian Premier League. In January 2018, he scored his first century in Twenty20 cricket, scoring 100 for Baroda against Gujarat in the 2017–18 Zonal T20 League.
