= 2020–21 Syed Mushtaq Ali Trophy =

Indian cricket tournament

- Dates: 10 – 31 January 2021
- Administrator(s): BCCI
- Cricket format: T20
- Tournament format(s): Round robin, then knockout
- Champions: Tamil Nadu (2nd title)
- Participants: 38
- Matches: 81
- Most runs: Narayan Jagadeesan (364) (Tamil Nadu)
- Most wickets: Ashutosh Aman (16) (Bihar)
- Official website: http://www.bcci.tv

The 2020–21 Syed Mushtaq Ali Trophy was the thirteenth edition of the Syed Mushtaq Ali Trophy, an annual Twenty20 tournament in India. Played from 10 to 31 January 2021, it was contested by all 38 Ranji Trophy teams and won by Tamil Nadu, their second title.

On 17 December 2020, the Board of Control for Cricket in India (BCCI) confirmed the fixtures, with the 38 teams split into six groups. Groups A to E had six teams, while the Plate Group had eight teams. The winners from each group progressed to the quarter-finals, along with the next two teams in Groups A to E with the most points.

Punjab and Baroda won Groups A and C respectively to qualify for the knockout stage of the tournament. Tamil Nadu won Group B to also progress to the knockout stage. The Plate Group was won by Bihar, making them the only team from that group to progress. On the final day of the group stage matches, Rajasthan won Group D, and Haryana won Group E to advance. Karnataka and Himachal Pradesh took the remaining two places in the quarter-finals, finishing the group stage as the best two second placed teams.

The first two quarter-finals saw Punjab beat Karnataka by nine wickets, and Tamil Nadu beat Himachal Pradesh by five wickets. In the third quarter-final, Baroda beat Haryana by eight wickets. In the last quarter-final match, Rajasthan became the fourth team to progress to the semi-finals, with a 16-run win over Bihar.

In the first semi-final, Tamil Nadu beat Rajasthan by seven wickets to advance to their second successive final in the Syed Mushtaq Ali Trophy. They were joined in the final by Baroda, after they beat Punjab by 25 runs in the second semi-final. In the final, Tamil Nadu beat Baroda by seven wickets to win the tournament.

== Player transfers ==
The following player transfers were approved ahead of the season.

Player	From	To
Iqbal Abdulla	Sikkim	Uttarakhand
Robin Bist	Rajasthan	Sikkim
Jay Bista	Mumbai	Uttarakhand
Ashoke Dinda	Bengal	Goa
Samad Fallah	Maharashtra	Uttarakhand
Sheldon Jackson	Saurashtra	Pondicherry
Arun Karthik	Pondicherry	Tamil Nadu
Lalith Mohan	Hyderabad	Andhra
Ambati Rayudu	Hyderabad	Andhra
Anureet Singh	Baroda	Sikkim
Barinder Sran	Chandigarh	Punjab
Sandeep Warrier	Kerala	Tamil Nadu

== Background ==
The tournament was originally scheduled to run from 19 November to 7 December 2020. However, in September 2020, the Board of Control for Cricket in India (BCCI) warned that the domestic cricket season could be severely curtailed due to the COVID-19 pandemic, including the possibility of no cricket taking place. On 20 September 2020, Nadim Memon of the Mumbai Cricket Association emailed the BCCI to suggest that the tournament could be played Mumbai. The city has six cricket stadiums, complete with all the relevant facilities and hotels nearby. On 13 December 2020, the BCCI confirmed the fixtures and venues for the tournament, with each group playing their matches in bio-secure bubbles.

== League stage ==
=== Group A ===
Team	Pld	W	L	T	NR	Pts	NRR
Punjab (Q)	5	5	0	0	0	20	+2.483
Karnataka (Q)	5	4	1	0	0	16	+0.292
Jammu & Kashmir	5	3	2	0	0	12	+0.243
Railways	5	2	3	0	0	8	–1.357
Uttar Pradesh	5	1	4	0	0	4	–0.291
Tripura	5	0	5	0	0	0	–1.427

- Top team advanced to the Knockout Stage

=== Group B ===
Team	Pld	W	L	T	NR	Pts	NRR
Tamil Nadu (Q)	5	5	0	0	0	20	+1.88
Bengal	5	3	2	0	0	12	+0.654
Jharkhand	5	3	2	0	0	12	+0.23
Assam	5	2	3	0	0	8	-0.961
Hyderabad	5	1	4	0	0	4	–0.199
Odisha	5	1	4	0	0	4	–1.569

- Top team advanced to the Knockout Stage

=== Group C ===
Team	Pld	W	L	T	NR	Pts	NRR
Baroda (Q)	5	5	0	0	0	20	+1.465
Himachal Pradesh (Q)	5	4	1	0	0	16	+0.940
Gujarat	5	3	2	0	0	12	+0.891
Uttarakhand	5	1	4	0	0	4	–0.981
Maharashtra	5	1	4	0	0	4	–1.169
Chhattisgarh	5	1	4	0	0	4	–1.390

- Top team advanced to the Knockout Stage

=== Group D ===
Team	Pld	W	L	T	NR	Pts	NRR
Rajasthan (Q)	5	4	1	0	0	16	+0.503
Madhya Pradesh	5	4	1	0	0	16	+0.285
Saurashtra	5	3	2	0	0	12	+1.560
Goa	5	3	2	0	0	12	–0.373
Services	5	1	4	0	0	4	–0.145
Vidarbha	5	0	5	0	0	0	–1.907

- Top team advanced to the Knockout Stage

=== Group E ===
Team	Pld	W	L	T	NR	Pts	NRR
Haryana (Q)	5	5	0	0	0	20	+0.869
Kerala	5	3	2	0	0	12	+0.454
Delhi	5	3	2	0	0	12	+1.913
Pondicherry	5	2	3	0	0	8	–1.192
Andhra Pradesh	5	1	4	0	0	4	–0.593
Mumbai	5	1	4	0	0	4	–1.374

- Top team advanced to the Knockout Stage

=== Plate Group ===
Team	Pld	W	L	T	NR	Pts	NRR
Bihar (Q)	5	5	0	0	0	20	+1.161
Chandigarh	5	4	0	0	1	18	+5.738
Nagaland	5	4	0	0	1	18	+3.047
Meghalaya	5	2	3	0	0	12	+1.154
Manipur	5	2	3	0	0	8	–0.560
Sikkim	5	1	4	0	0	4	–2.939
Arunachal Pradesh	5	0	5	0	0	0	–2.393
Mizoram	5	0	5	0	0	0	–4.521

- First placed team advanced to the Knockout Stage

== Knockout stage ==
Quarterfinals
B1	Tamil Nadu	141/5 (17.5 overs)
C2	Himachal Pradesh	135/9 (20 overs)
D1	Rajasthan	164/5 (20 overs)
P1	Bihar	148/4 (20 overs)
A1	Punjab	89/1 (12.4 overs)
A2	Karnataka	87 (17.2 overs)
E1	Haryana	148/7 (20 overs)
C1	Baroda	150/2 (20 overs)

Semifinals
B1	Tamil Nadu	158/3 (18.4 overs)
D1	Rajasthan	154/9 (20 overs)
A1	Punjab	135/8 (20 overs)
C1	Baroda	160/3 (20 overs)

Final
B1	Tamil Nadu	123/3 (18 overs)
C1	Baroda	120/9 (20 overs)

=== Quarter-finals ===
1st Quarter-final
26 January 2021
Scorecard

Karnataka; 87 (17.2 overs)	v	Punjab; 89/1 (12.4 overs)
Aniruddha Joshi 27 (34); Siddarth Kaul 3/15 (4 overs)		Prabhsimran Singh 49* (37); Abhimanyu Mithun 1/11 (2 overs)

Punjab won by 9 wickets
Narendra Modi Stadium, Ahmedabad
Umpires: Chirra Ravikanthreddy and Jayaraman Madanagopal

- Punjab won the toss and elected to field.

2nd Quarter-final
26 January 2021
Scorecard

Himachal Pradesh; 135/9 (20 overs)	v	Tamil Nadu; 141/5 (17.5 overs)
Rishi Dhawan 35* (26); Sonu Yadav 3/14 (4 overs)		Baba Aparajith 52* (45); Vaibhav Arora 3/30 (4 overs)

Tamil Nadu won by 5 wickets
Narendra Modi Stadium, Ahmedabad
Umpires: Anil Dandekar and Ulhas Gandhe

- Tamil Nadu won the toss and elected to field.

3rd Quarter-final
27 January 2021
Scorecard

Haryana; 148/7 (20 overs)	v	Baroda; 150/2 (20 overs)
Himanshu Rana 49 (40); Kartik Kakade 2/7 (2 overs)		Vishnu Solanki 71* (46); Yuzvendra Chahal 1/15 (4 overs)

Baroda won by 8 wickets
Narendra Modi Stadium, Ahmedabad
Umpires: Jayaraman Madanagopal and Krishnamachari Srinivasan

- Baroda won the toss and elected to field.

4th Quarter-final
27 January 2021
Scorecard

Rajasthan; 164/5 (20 overs)	v	Bihar; 148/4 (20 overs)
Mahipal Lomror 78* (37); Suraj Kashyap 2/28 (4 overs)		Mangal Mahrour 68* (58); Chandrapal Singh 1/21 (4 overs)

Rajasthan won by 16 runs
Narendra Modi Stadium, Ahmedabad
Umpires: Anil Dandekar and Yeshwant Barde

- Rajasthan won the toss and elected to bat.
- Suraj Kashyap (Bihar) made his T20 debut.

=== Semi-finals ===
1st Semi-final
29 January 2021
Scorecard

Rajasthan; 154/9 (20 overs)	v	Tamil Nadu; 158/3 (18.4 overs)
Ashok Menaria 51 (32); M. Mohammed 4/24 (4 overs)		Arun Karthik 89* (54); Tanveer Ul-Haq 1/22 (3 overs)

Tamil Nadu won by 7 wickets
Narendra Modi Stadium, Ahmedabad
Umpires: Ulhas Gandhe and Yeshwant Barde

- Rajasthan won the toss and elected to bat.

2nd Semi-final
29 January 2021
Scorecard

Baroda; 160/3 (20 overs)	v	Punjab; 135/8 (20 overs)
Kedar Devdhar 64 (49); Mayank Markande 1/29 (4 overs)		Mandeep Singh 42* (24); Lukman Meriwala 3/28 (4 overs)

Baroda won by 25 runs
Narendra Modi Stadium, Ahmedabad
Umpires: Chirra Ravikanthreddy and Krishnamachari Srinivasan

- Punjab won the toss and elected to field.

=== Final ===
Final
31 January 2021
Scorecard

Baroda; 120/9 (20 overs)	v	Tamil Nadu; 123/3 (18 overs)
Vishnu Solanki 49 (55); Manimaran Siddharth 4/20 (4 overs)		Chezhian Harinishanth 35 (38); Atit Sheth 1/20 (3 overs)

Tamil Nadu won by 7 wickets
Narendra Modi Stadium, Ahmedabad
Umpires: Ulhas Gandhe and Yeshwant Barde
Player of the match: Manimaran Siddharth (Tamil Nadu)

- Tamil Nadu won the toss and elected to field.
