= Ashutosh Aman =

Indian cricketer (born 1986)

Personal information
- Born: 19 May 1986 (age 40); Gaya, Bihar, India
- Batting: Right-handed
- Bowling: Left-arm orthodox
- Role: Bowling Allrounder

Domestic team information
- Years: Team
- 2018–present: Bihar

Career statistics
Competition	FC	LA	T20
Matches	34	42	29
Runs scored	999	517	110
Batting average	24.36	19.14	7.85
100s/50s	1/6	0/0	0/8
Top score	111	37*	24
Balls bowled	6,603	1,801	588
Wickets	171	43	32
Bowling average	15.23	29.62	19.28
5 wickets in innings	15	0	0
10 wickets in match	6	0	0
Best bowling	8/51	4/27	4/9
Catches/stumpings	10/–	3/–	8/–
- Source: ESPNcricinfo, 9 April 2025

Ashutosh Aman (born 19 May 1986) is an Indian cricketer who plays for Bihar in domestic cricket.

== Domestic career ==
He made his List A debut for Bihar in the 2018–19 Vijay Hazare Trophy on 19 September 2018. He made his first-class debut for Bihar in the 2018–19 Ranji Trophy on 1 November 2018. In the fourth round match against Sikkim, he took a five-wicket haul in each innings, with Bihar winning their first match of the tournament, by 395 runs. In December 2018, he became the first bowler to take 50 wickets in the 2018–19 Ranji Trophy tournament. He went on to finish the tournament with 68 wickets, breaking the previous record of 64 dismissals set by Bishan Singh Bedi in the 1974–75 tournament.

He made his Twenty20 debut for Bihar in the 2018–19 Syed Mushtaq Ali Trophy on 22 February 2019. In August 2019, he was named in the India Blue team's squad for the 2019–20 Duleep Trophy.

In January 2021, he was the leading wicket-taker in the 2020–21 Syed Mushtaq Ali Trophy, with sixteen dismissals in six matches.
