= Mangal Mahrour =

Indian cricketer (born 1992)

Personal information
- Full name: Mangal Kumar Mahrour
- Born: 1 April 1992 (age 34); Gaya, Bihar, India
- Role: Batsman

Domestic team information
- Years: Team
- 2018-19: Bihar
- 2019: Railways
- 2021: Bihar
- Source: ESPNcricinfo, 22 December 2018

Mangal Mahrour (born 1 April 1992) is an Indian cricketer. He made his first-class debut for Bihar in the 2018–19 Ranji Trophy on 22 December 2018, scoring 177 runs in the second innings. He made his Twenty20 debut for Bihar in the 2018–19 Syed Mushtaq Ali Trophy on 22 February 2019. He made his List A debut on 25 September 2019, for Railways in the 2019–20 Vijay Hazare Trophy.
