= Mrunal Devdhar =

Indian cricketer (born 1992)

Personal information
- Full name: Mrunal Hemant Devdhar
- Born: 16 December 1992 (age 33); Vadodara, Gujarat, India
- Batting: Right-handed
- Bowling: Right arm medium
- Relatives: Kedar Devdhar (brother)
- Source: ESPNcricinfo, 10 January 2016

Mrunal Devdhar (born 16 December 1992) is an Indian cricketer. He made his Twenty20 debut on 2 January 2016 in the 2015–16 Syed Mushtaq Ali Trophy. He made his first-class debut for Railways in the 2016–17 Ranji Trophy on 13 October 2016. He made his List A debut for Railways in the 2016–17 Vijay Hazare Trophy on 25 February 2017.
