= Wajid (name) =

- Pronunciation: WAA-jidh
- Gender: Male

Origin
- Origin: Arabic
- Meaning: Finder
- Region of origin: Muslim world

Other names
- Related names: Wajida (feminine)

Wajid is a family name and male given name.

Wajida is a feminine form of Wajid.

It is of Arabic origin meaning one who perceives or finds. It is a Muslim theophoric name, from Al-Wajid (الواجد), one of the 99 names of God in the Qur'an, which signifies The Finder, The All-Perceiving, The Inventor and Maker.

== Notable people named Wajid and Wajida ==
- Wajid Ali Shah (1822–1887), Indian ruler
- Syed Wajid Ali (1911–2008), Pakistani sports person (ex chairman Pakistan Olympic Association)
- S. Wajid Ali (1890–1951), Bengali nationalist
- Wajid Khan (born 1946), Canadian politician
- Wajid Nashad (1955–2008), Pakistani composer
- Wajid Ali, Indian film musician, one half of the duo Sajid–Wajid
- Wajida Tabassum (1935–2011), Indian writer
