= Bihar cricket team =

Indian domestic cricket team

Bihar Cricket Team बिहार क्रिकेट टीम

Personnel
- Captain: Mangal Mahrour
- Coach: Ashutosh Aman
- Owner: Bihar Cricket Association

Team information
- Founded: 1936
- Home ground: Rajgir International Cricket Stadium
- Capacity: 45,000

History
- First-class debut: Bengal in 1936 at Rangers Ground, Calcutta
- Ranji Trophy wins: 0
- Irani Cup wins: 0
- Vijay Hazare Trophy wins: 0
- Syed Mushtaq Ali Trophy wins: 0
- Official website: biharcricketassociation.com

The Bihar cricket team represents the state of Bihar in Indian domestic cricket. It is administered by the Bihar Cricket Association, which is affiliated with the BCCI.

== History ==
=== 1936 to 2004 ===
The team competed in the Ranji Trophy from 1936–37 until 2003–04. When the state of Bihar was divided into two states, Bihar and Jharkhand, most of the former state's cricket infrastructure was in Jharkhand, so Jharkhand commenced playing in the Ranji Trophy. The state of Bihar was no longer represented. Before this partition Bihar played 236 first-class matches, winning 78, losing 56 and drawing 102.

Bihar's best performance in Ranji Trophy was in 1975-76 Ranji Trophy season, when Daljit Singh led Bihar to Ranji Trophy finals.

=== 2018 onwards ===
In April 2018, the Board of Control for Cricket in India (BCCI) reinstated Bihar, ahead of the 2018–19 Ranji Trophy tournament. On 19 September 2018, they won their opening fixture of the 2018–19 Vijay Hazare Trophy, beating Nagaland by 8 wickets.

On 8 October 2018, Bihar defeated Mizoram by 9 wickets to enter the Quarter-finals of 2018-19 Vijay Hazare Trophy. Bihar won the Plate Group and progressed to the knock-out phase of the tournament. However, they were beaten by nine wickets by Mumbai in their quarter-final match to be knocked out of the tournament.

In November 2018, in their opening match of the 2018–19 Ranji Trophy, they lost to Uttarakhand by ten wickets. They finished the 2018–19 tournament second in the table, with six wins from their eight matches.

In March 2019, Bihar finished sixth in Group B of the 2018–19 Syed Mushtaq Ali Trophy, with one win from their six matches. Keshav Kumar was the leading run-scorer for the team in the tournament, with 145 runs, and Ashutosh Aman was the leading wicket-taker, with seven dismissals.

On 29 January 2023, Bihar defeated Manipur by 220 runs to win the Plate Group Final of 2022-23 Ranji Trophy.

== Honours ==
- Ranji Trophy
  - Runners-up: 1975–76

== Home grounds ==
Name	City	State	First used	Last used	Notes
Rajgir International Cricket Stadium	Rajgir	Bihar	2026	-	BCA Home Ground
Moin-ul-Haq Stadium	Patna	Bihar	1970	2026	Under Renovation
Urja Stadium	Patna	Bihar	2017	2023	Owned by Bihar power department

== Current squad ==
Players with International Cap are listed in Bold

Name	Birth date	Batting style	Bowling style	Notes
Batsmen
Mangal Mahrour	1 April 1992 (age 34)	Right-handed	Right-arm medium	**Captain**
**Vaibhav Sooryavanshi**	27 March 2011 (age 15)	Left-handed	Slow left arm orthodox	Plays for **Rajasthan Royals** in IPL
Piyush Singh	4 May 2001 (age 25)	Right-handed	Right-arm offbreak	
Kumar Rajnish	28 December 1993 (age 32)	Right-handed	Right-arm offbreak	
Prithvi Raj	24 March 2009 (age 17)	Right-handed	Right-arm legbreak	
All-Rounders
Sakibul Gani	2 September 1999 (age 27)	Right-handed	Right-arm medium-fast	
Akash Raj	24 October 2002 (age 24)	Right-handed	Right-arm medium	
Raghuvendra Pratap Singh	1 August 2003 (age 23)	Right-handed	Right-arm medium-fast	
Khalid Alam	26 November 1999 (age 26)	Right-handed	Slow left arm orthodox	
Sachin Kumar Singh	25 December 1997 (age 28)	Left-handed	Slow left arm orthodox	
Naman Gaurav	26 December 2002 (age 23)	Right-handed	Right-arm offbreak	
Wicket-keepers
Bipin Saurabh	20 November 1999 (age 26)	Right-handed		
Ayush Loharuka	26 June 2003 (age 23)	Right-handed		
Sraman Nigrodh	28 May 2005 (age 21)	left-handed		
Spin Bowlers
Suraj Kashyap	14 August 2003 (age 23)	Right-handed	Right-arm offbreak	
Himanshu Singh	23 September 1997 (age 29)	Right-handed	Right-arm legbreak	
Himanshu Tiwari	22 January 2003 (age 23)	Right-handed	Slow left arm orthodox	
Aditya Raj	23 August 2006 (age 20)	Left-handed	Slow left arm orthodox	
Pradip Suman Kumar	15 November 2005 (age 20)	Right-handed	Slow left arm orthodox	
Pace Bowlers
Amod Yadav	10 December 2001 (age 24)	Right-handed	Right-arm medium	
Sakib Hussain	14 December 2004 (age 21)	Right-handed	Right-arm fast	Plays for **Sunrisers Hyderabad** in IPL
Shabbir Khan	31 March 1997 (age 29)	Right-handed	Right-arm medium	
Shabir Khan	3 December 1998 (age 27)	Right-handed	Right-arm medium	
Mohammed Izhar	1 January 2004 (age 22)	Right-handed	Left-arm medium	Plays for **Mumbai Indians** in IPL
Badal Kanauji	11 August 2006 (age 20)	Right-handed	Left-arm medium	

Updated as on 2 November 2026

== Support staff ==
=== Men's cricket team ===
For domestic season 2026-27

- Head Coach: Ashutosh Aman
- Assistant Coach: Ashok Kumar
- Team Physio: Dr. Hemendu Kumar Singh
- Team Trainer: Gopal Kumar

== Famous Players ==
Players from Bihar who have played international cricket for India, along with year of debut:

- Shute Banerjee (1949)
- Vijay Rajindernath (1952)
- Ramesh Saxena (1967)
- Randhir Singh (1981)
- Subroto Banerjee (1991)
- Saba Karim (1997)
- M.S. Dhoni (2004)
- Vaibhav Sooryavanshi (2026)
