= 2019–20 Syed Mushtaq Ali Trophy Group E =

Cricket tournament

- Dates: 8 – 18 November 2019
- Administrator: BCCI
- Cricket format: Twenty20 cricket
- Tournament format: Round-robin
- Participants: 8

The 2019–20 Syed Mushtaq Ali Trophy was the eleventh season of the Syed Mushtaq Ali Trophy, a Twenty20 cricket tournament in India. It was contested by 38 teams, divided into five groups, with eight teams in Group E. The group stage started on 8 November 2019. The top two teams from Group E progressed to the Super League section of the competition. Two rain-affected matches from the second day of the tournament were rescheduled to take place on 18 November 2019. After the final day of group stage matches, Delhi and Jharkhand had progressed to the Super League stage of the tournament.

== Points table ==
Team	Pld	W	L	T	NR	Pts	NRR
Delhi	7	5	1	0	1	22	+1.331
Jharkhand	7	5	1	0	1	22	+0.982
Gujarat	7	4	2	0	1	18	+1.974
Jammu & Kashmir	7	4	2	0	1	18	+0.449
Odisha	7	3	3	0	1	14	+0.576
Saurashtra	7	3	4	0	0	12	+0.559
Nagaland	7	1	6	0	0	4	−2.437
Sikkim	7	0	6	0	1	2	−3.002

- Top two teams advanced to the Super League,

== Fixtures ==
=== Round 1 ===
8 November 2019
Scorecard

Delhi	v	Gujarat

Match abandoned
Lalabhai Contractor Stadium, Surat
Umpires: Akshay Totre and Yeshwant Barde

- No toss.
- No play was possible due to rain.

8 November 2019
Scorecard

Jammu & Kashmir	v	Sikkim

Match abandoned
CB Patel International Cricket Stadium, Surat
Umpires: Jayaraman Madanagopal and Chirra Ravikanthreddy

- No toss.
- No play was possible due to rain.

8 November 2019
Scorecard

Jharkhand	v	Odisha

Match abandoned
Lalabhai Contractor Stadium, Surat
Umpires: Jayaraman Madanagopal and Chirra Ravikanthreddy

- No toss.
- No play was possible due to rain.

8 November 2019
Scorecard

Nagaland; 69/6 (16 overs)	v	Saurashtra; 73/1 (10.2 overs)
Imliwati Lemtur 11* (4); Jaydev Unadkat 2/10 (4 overs)		Harvik Desai 22* (26); Shrikant Mundhe 1/9 (2 overs)

Saurashtra won by 9 wickets
CB Patel International Cricket Stadium, Surat
Umpires: Akshay Totre and Yeshwant Barde

- Saurashtra won the toss and elected to field.
- The match was reduced to 16 overs per side due to rain.
- Aosashi Longchar, Nagaho Chishi, Hokaito Zhimomi, Moakumzuk Tzudir (Nagaland) and Parth Chauhan (Saurashtra) all made their T20 debuts.

=== Round 2 ===
9 November 2019
Scorecard

Delhi	v	Odisha

Match abandoned
CB Patel International Cricket Stadium, Surat
Umpires: Jayaraman Madanagopal and Chirra Ravikanthreddy

- No toss.
- No play was possible due to rain.
- The match was rescheduled to 18 November 2019.

9 November 2019
Scorecard

Gujarat	v	Jammu & Kashmir

Match abandoned
Lalabhai Contractor Stadium, Surat
Umpires: Jayaraman Madanagopal and Chirra Ravikanthreddy

- No toss.
- No play was possible due to rain.
- The match was rescheduled to 18 November 2019.

9 November 2019
Scorecard

Saurashtra; 169/3 (20 overs)	v	Jharkhand; 170/4 (19.4 overs)
Kishan Parmar 54 (51); Varun Aaron 2/37 (4 overs)		Virat Singh 67* (38); Chirag Jani 2/17 (4 overs)

Jharkhand won by 6 wickets
CB Patel International Cricket Stadium, Surat
Umpires: Akshay Totre and Yeshwant Barde

- Jharkhand won the toss and elected to field.
- Vandit Jivrajani (Saurashtra) made his T20 debut.

9 November 2019
Scorecard

Sikkim; 122/5 (20 overs)	v	Nagaland; 124/3 (17.3 overs)
Yashpal Singh 41 (33); Shrikant Mundhe 2/29 (4 overs)		Stuart Binny 42* (21); Palzor Tamang 2/9 (3 overs)

Nagaland won by 7 wickets
Lalabhai Contractor Stadium, Surat
Umpires: Akshay Totre and Yeshwant Barde

- Sikkim won the toss and elected to bat.
- Temjentoshi Jamir (Nagaland), Benoy Upreti, Dinesh Rai and Padam Limboo (Sikkim) all made their T20 debuts.

=== Round 3 ===
11 November 2019
Scorecard

Nagaland; 75/9 (20 overs)	v	Delhi; 78/2 (12.3 overs)
Shrikant Mundhe 22 (27); Pawan Negi 3/11 (4 overs)		Dhruv Shorey 27* (27); Stuart Binny 2/21 (4 overs)

Delhi won by 8 wickets
CB Patel International Cricket Stadium, Surat
Umpires: Jayaraman Madanagopal and Yeshwant Barde

- Delhi won the toss and elected to field.
- Karan Dagar, Simarjeet Singh (Delhi) and Oren Ngullie (Nagaland) all made their T20 debuts.

11 November 2019
Scorecard

Saurashtra; 214/7 (20 overs)	v	Gujarat; 157/8 (20 overs)
Dharmendrasinh Jadeja 59 (32); Roosh Kalaria 2/28 (4 overs)		Axar Patel 70* (48); Jaydev Unadkat 3/32 (4 overs)

Saurashtra won by 57 runs
Lalabhai Contractor Stadium, Surat
Umpires: Akshay Totre and Chirra Ravikanthreddy

- Gujarat won the toss and elected to field.
- Ripal Patel (Gujarat) made his T20 debut.

11 November 2019
Scorecard

Jharkhand; 107 (19.4 overs)	v	Jammu & Kashmir; 100 (19.5 overs)
Virat Singh 44 (43); Umar Nazir Mir 5/17 (4 overs)		Shubham Khajuria 38* (40); Rahul Shukla 4/10 (4 overs)

Jharkhand won by 7 runs
CB Patel International Cricket Stadium, Surat
Umpires: Jayaraman Madanagopal and Yeshwant Barde

- Jammu & Kashmir won the toss and elected to field.
- Auqib Nabi, Nasir Rasool, Fazil Rashid and Abid Mushtaq (Jammu & Kashmir) all made their T20 debuts.

11 November 2019
Scorecard

Sikkim; 121/4 (20 overs)	v	Odisha; 125/3 (17.1 overs)
Yashpal Singh 63* (49); Ankit Yadav 1/17 (4 overs)		Subhranshu Senapati 44* (37); Palzor Tamang 2/20 (4 overs)

Odisha won by 7 wickets
Lalabhai Contractor Stadium, Surat
Umpires: Akshay Totre and Chirra Ravikanthreddy

- Sikkim won the toss and elected to bat.
- Prabin Luha (Odisha) and Jahan Uddin (Sikkim) both made their T20 debuts.

=== Round 4 ===
12 November 2019
Scorecard

Saurashtra; 173/5 (20 overs)	v	Delhi; 174/4 (19.5 overs)
Arpit Vasavada 63* (42); Lalit Yadav 1/10 (2 overs)		Anuj Rawat 88* (58); Jaydev Unadkat 1/29 (4 overs)

Delhi won by 6 wickets
CB Patel International Cricket Stadium, Surat
Umpires: Jayaraman Madanagopal and Akshay Totre

- Delhi won the toss and elected to field.
- Rohan Rathi (Delhi) made his T20 debut.

12 November 2019
Scorecard

Gujarat; 199/6 (20 overs)	v	Nagaland; 100/7 (20 overs)
Chirag Gandhi 41* (13); Imliwati Lemtur 3/23 (4 overs)		Hokaito Zhimomi 55* (47); Roosh Kalaria 2/13 (4 overs)

Gujarat won by 99 runs
Lalabhai Contractor Stadium, Surat
Umpires: Chirra Ravikanthreddy and Yeshwant Barde

- Nagaland won the toss and elected to field.
- Tejosel Yiethun (Nagaland) made his T20 debut.

12 November 2019
Scorecard

Jammu & Kashmir; 164/2 (20 overs)	v	Odisha; 161/7 (20 overs)
Jatin Wadhwan 48* (39); Ankit Yadav 1/49 (4 overs)		Sandeep Pattnaik 51 (48); Abid Mushtaq 2/24 (4 overs)

Jammu & Kashmir won by 3 runs
Lalabhai Contractor Stadium, Surat
Umpires: Chirra Ravikanthreddy and Yeshwant Barde

- Jammu & Kashmir won the toss and elected to bat.

12 November 2019
Scorecard

Sikkim; 63 (16 overs)	v	Jharkhand; 65/2 (9.5 overs)
Iqbal Abdulla 20 (16); Anukul Roy 3/11 (4 overs)		Virat Singh 35* (26); Ishwar Chaudhary 1/18 (4 overs)

Jharkhand won by 8 wickets
CB Patel International Cricket Stadium, Surat
Umpires: Jayaraman Madanagopal and Akshay Totre

- Sikkim won the toss and elected to bat.
- Vivekanand Tiwari (Jharkhand) made his T20 debut.

=== Round 5 ===
14 November 2019
Scorecard

Delhi; 165/7 (20 overs)	v	Jammu & Kashmir; 166/2 (15.5 overs)
Nitish Rana 55 (30); Umar Nazir 2/35 (4 overs)		Manzoor Dar 58 (24); Lalit Yadav 1/24 (2 overs)

Jammu & Kashmir won by 8 wickets
CB Patel International Cricket Stadium, Surat
Umpires: Chirra Ravikanthreddy and Yeshwant Barde

- Delhi won the toss and elected to bat.

14 November 2019
Scorecard

Sikkim; 49 (19.3 overs)	v	Gujarat; 50/1 (4.2 overs)
Ashish Thapa 12 (23); Piyush Chawla 3/4 (4 overs)		Urvil Patel 26 (12); Prabesh Gurung 1/13 (1 over)

Gujarat won by 9 wickets
Lalabhai Contractor Stadium, Surat
Umpires: Jayaraman Madanagopal and Akshay Totre

- Sikkim won the toss and elected to bat.
- Prabesh Gurung and Anil Subba (Sikkim) both made their T20 debuts.

14 November 2019
Scorecard

Nagaland; 145/6 (20 overs)	v	Jharkhand; 149/3 (17.5 overs)
Shrikant Mundhe 74 (46); Varun Aaron 3/17 (4 overs)		Anand Singh 81* (59); Inakato Zhimomi 1/11 (1 over)

Jharkhand won by 7 wickets
CB Patel International Cricket Stadium, Surat
Umpires: Chirra Ravikanthreddy and Yeshwant Barde

- Nagaland won the toss and elected to bat.

14 November 2019
Scorecard

Odisha; 163/5 (20 overs)	v	Saurashtra; 114 (19.3 overs)
Biplab Samantray 60* (35); Jay Chauhan 1/23 (2 overs)		Harvik Desai 26 (22); Govinda Poddar 3/7 (1.3 overs)

Odisha won by 49 runs
Lalabhai Contractor Stadium, Surat
Umpires: Jayaraman Madanagopal and Akshay Totre

- Odisha won the toss and elected to bat.

=== Round 6 ===
15 November 2019
Scorecard

Delhi; 175/6 (20 overs)	v	Jharkhand; 167/6 (20 overs)
Nitish Rana 66 (42); Utkarsh Singh 2/24 (3 overs)		Utkarsh Singh 49* (25); Simarjeet Singh 3/21 (4 overs)

Delhi won by 9 runs
CB Patel International Cricket Stadium, Surat
Umpires: Jayaraman Madanagopal and Akshay Totre

- Jharkhand won the toss and elected to field.

15 November 2019
Scorecard

Nagaland; 128/4 (20 overs)	v	Jammu & Kashmir; 132/2 (11.5 overs)
Shrikant Mundhe 63* (46); Parvez Rasool 2/30 (4 overs)		Shubham Khajuria 73* (40); Imliwati Lemtur 1/20 (3 overs)

Jammu & Kashmir won by 8 wickets
Lalabhai Contractor Stadium, Surat
Umpires: Chirra Ravikanthreddy and Yeshwant Barde

- Nagaland won the toss and elected to bat.

15 November 2019
Scorecard

Odisha; 101 (18.4 overs)	v	Gujarat; 102/4 (16.1 overs)
Subhranshu Senapati 32 (22); Piyush Chawla 3/9 (4 overs)		Bhargav Merai 48* (47); Rajesh Mohanty 1/14 (2 overs)

Gujarat won by 6 wickets
CB Patel International Cricket Stadium, Surat
Umpires: Jayaraman Madanagopal and Akshay Totre

- Odisha won the toss and elected to bat.

15 November 2019
Scorecard

Sikkim; 96 (19.2 overs)	v	Saurashtra; 97/4 (15.5 overs)
Yashpal Singh 41 (39); Jaydev Unadkat 4/5 (3 overs)		Arpit Vasavada 31 (22); Dinesh Rai 2/15 (4 overs)

Saurashtra won by 6 wickets
Lalabhai Contractor Stadium, Surat
Umpires: Chirra Ravikanthreddy and Yeshwant Barde

- Sikkim won the toss and elected to bat.
- Sabin Chettri (Sikkim) made his T20 debut.

=== Round 7 ===
17 November 2019
Scorecard

Sikkim; 88/7 (20 overs)	v	Delhi; 91/1 (9 overs)
Iqbal Abdulla 37 (45); Karan Dagar 4/12 (4 overs)		Hiten Dalal 54* (24); Yashpal Singh 1/4 (2 overs)

Delhi won by 9 wickets
CB Patel International Cricket Stadium, Surat
Umpires: Jayaraman Madanagopal and Akshay Totre

- Sikkim won the toss and elected to bat.
- Rajesh Sharma (Delhi) made his T20 debut.

17 November 2019
Scorecard

Gujarat; 128/7 (20 overs)	v	Jharkhand; 131/1 (18 overs)
Urvil Patel 47 (38); Varun Aaron 2/26 (4 overs)		Virat Singh 56* (32); Arzan Nagwaswalla 1/25 (3 overs)

Jharkhand won by 9 wickets
Lalabhai Contractor Stadium, Surat
Umpires: Yeshwant Barde

- Gujarat won the toss and elected to bat.

17 November 2019
Scorecard

Saurashtra; 149/7 (20 overs)	v	Jammu & Kashmir; 155/4 (19.4 overs)
Sheldon Jackson 55* (46); Auqib Nabi 4/43 (4 overs)		Parvez Rasool 59* (40); Chetan Sakariya 2/34 (4 overs)

Jammu & Kashmir won by 6 wickets
CB Patel International Cricket Stadium, Surat
Umpires: Jayaraman Madanagopal and Akshay Totre

- Saurashtra won the toss and elected to bat.

17 November 2019
Scorecard

Odisha; 149/9 (20 overs)	v	Nagaland; 104 (17 overs)
Subhranshu Senapati 42 (21); Imliwati Lemtur 2/20 (4 overs)		Stuart Binny 31 (20); Govinda Poddar 3/21 (3 overs)

Odisha won by 45 runs
Lalabhai Contractor Stadium, Surat
Umpires: Chirra Ravikanthreddy and Yeshwant Barde

- Nagaland won the toss and elected to field.

=== Round 8 ===
18 November 2019
Scorecard

Jammu & Kashmir; 101 (18.3 overs)	v	Gujarat; 104/2 (13.3 overs)
Abdul Samad 27 (26); Chintan Gaja 4/15 (3.3 overs)		Kshitij Patel 44* (36); Ram Dayal 1/15 (2 overs)

Gujarat won by 8 wickets
Lalabhai Contractor Stadium, Surat
Umpires: Yeshwant Barde and Akshay Totre

- Gujarat won the toss and elected to field.
- This match was rescheduled from 9 November 2019.

18 November 2019
Scorecard

Delhi; 149/6 (20 overs)	v	Odisha; 129 (18.1 overs)
Shikhar Dhawan 35 (33); Abhishek Raut 2/21 (4 overs)		Suryakant Pradhan 48 (20); Lalit Yadav 3/10 (3.1 overs)

Delhi won by 8 runs
Lalabhai Contractor Stadium, Surat
Umpires: Yeshwant Barde and Akshay Totre

- Delhi won the toss and elected to bat.
- This match was rescheduled from 9 November 2019.
