= Rathi =

Rathi may refer to:

== People ==
=== Surname ===
- Himanshi Rathi (born 1999), Indian para chess player
- Kunj Bihari Lal Rathi (1910–1968), Indian politician from Uttar Pradesh
- Naveet Rathi, Indian lawn bowler
- Neha Rathi, Indian wrestler
- Nikhil Rathi (born 1979), British regulatory executive
- Nikhil Rathi (entrepreneur), Indian technology entrepreneur
- Rohan Rathi (born 1995), Indian cricketer
- Shubham Rathi (born 1992), Indian social activist
- Sumit Rathi (born 2001), Indian professional footballer
- Virpal Rathi (born 1961), Indian politician from Uttar Pradesh
- Vrinda Rathi (born 1989), Indian cricket umpire

=== Given name ===
- Rathi Arumugam (born 1982), Indian actress
- Rathi Menon (born 1991), Singaporean model and beauty pageant winner

== Other uses ==
- Rathi (warrior), in Hindu mythological wars
- Rathi cattle, an Indian breed of dairy cattle

== See also ==
- Rati, a Hindu goddess
- Rati (given name)
- Rati (Norse mythology), a tool used by Odin
- Rathee (surname), an Indian surname
