= Sardar Patel Gujarat Stadium =

Former cricket stadium in Ahmedabad, India

- Motera Stadium
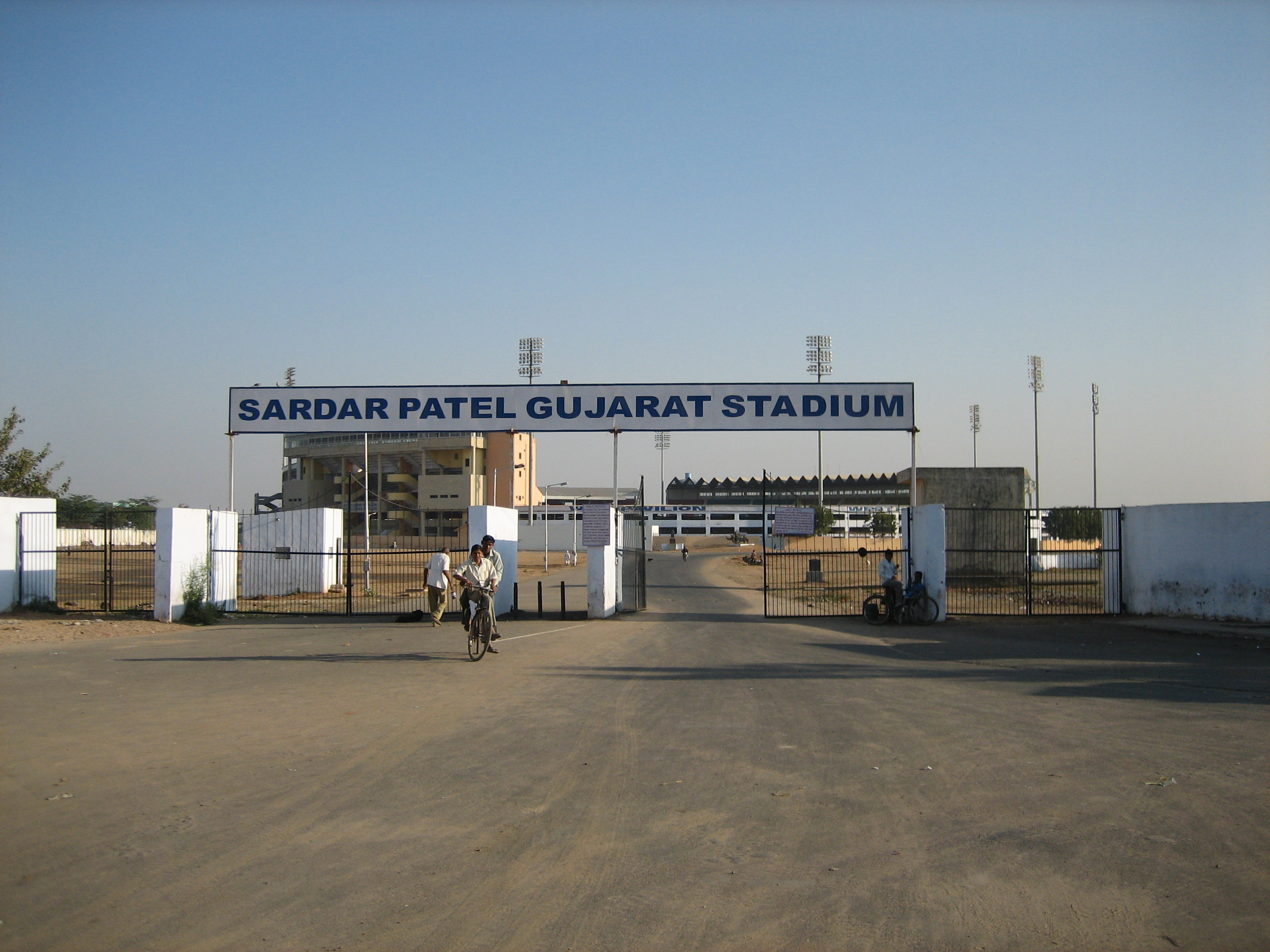
- Gate to the stadium in 2007
- Interactive map of Sardar Patel Gujarat Stadium
- Former names: Motera Cricket Stadium
- Address: Sardar Vallabhbhai Patel Sports Enclave, Motera, Ahmedabad, Gujarat, India
- Location: Ahmedabad, Gujarat, India
- Coordinates: 23°05′29″N 72°35′50″E
- Elevation: 84 m (276 ft)
- Owner: Gujarat Cricket Association
- Operator: Gujarat Cricket Association
- Capacity: 54,000 (2006–2015); 49,000 (1982–2006)
- Scoreboard: Yes
- Field shape: Oval
- Acreage: 63 acres (25 ha)
- Public transit: Motera Stadium Red Line

Construction
- Groundbreaking: 1983
- Built: 12 November 1983
- Opened: 12 November 1983
- Closed: September 2015
- Demolished: September 2015
- Architect: Shashi Prabhu

Tenants
- India national cricket team (1983–2015); Gujarat cricket team (1983–2015); India women's national cricket team (2011–2015); Gujarat women's cricket team (2006–2015); Rajasthan Royals (2010–2015)

Website
- GCA official website

Ground information
- Location: Ahmedabad, Gujarat, India
- Country: India
- Operator: Gujarat Cricket Association

International information
- First men's Test: 12–16 November 1983: India v West Indies
- Last men's Test: 15–19 November 2012: India v England
- First men's ODI: 5 October 1984: India v Australia
- Last men's ODI: 6 November 2014: India v Sri Lanka
- Only men's T20I: 28 December 2012: India v Pakistan
- First women's ODI: 12 March 2012: India v Australia
- Last women's ODI: 12 April 2013: India v Bangladesh
- First women's T20I: 22 January 2011: India v West Indies
- Last women's T20I: 24 January 2011: India v West Indies
- As of 6 November 2014; Source: Cricinfo

Sardar Patel Gujarat Stadium was a cricket stadium in Motera, Ahmedabad, India. Because of its location, the stadium was commonly called the Motera Stadium to avoid confusion with another stadium of the same name in the Navrangpura district. The Sardar Patel Stadium was owned by the Gujarat Cricket Association, was the largest in the state of Gujarat, with a capacity of 49,000, and was equipped with floodlights for day-and-night games. It hosted domestic and international cricket in the city until its demolition in 2015, including the 1987, 1996, and 2011 Cricket World Cups. In 2014, it was decided that a new stadium should be built on the same plot. It was a regular venue for Test cricket and One Day Internationals.

== History ==
=== 1983–2006 ===
Before 1982, international cricket matches in Ahmedabad were played at Sardar Vallabhbhai Patel Stadium in Navrangpura, owned by the Ahmedabad Municipal Corporation.

In 1982, the Government of Gujarat allocated a 400,000-square-metre (100-acre) stretch of land on the banks of the Sabarmati River to build a new stadium. Construction of the stadium was completed in nine months. The venue was originally known simply as Gujarat Stadium; however, it was soon renamed Sardar Patel Stadium (not to be confused with the previously mentioned site in Navrangpura), after Sardar Vallabhbhai Patel, India's first home minister and deputy prime minister. Since its completion, all international cricket fixtures in Ahmedabad have been held at the site. In the 1984-85 Australia India series, Sardar Patel Stadium hosted its first ODI, which India lost.

At the arena, Sunil Gavaskar became the first batter to score 10,000 runs in Test cricket, a feat he accomplished against Pakistan in their 1987 tour. Kapil Dev took a nine-wicket haul against the West Indies in 1983, and claimed his 432nd Test wicket at the stadium in 1995 to become the highest wicket-taker in Tests, surpassing Richard Hadlee's tally. In 1996, the ground hosted a low-scoring Test match against South Africa, in which the visitors lost 105–223.

Sardar Patel Stadium hosted one game each in the 1987 and 1996 World Cups, including the first match of the 1996 World Cup between England and New Zealand.

=== 2006–2015 ===
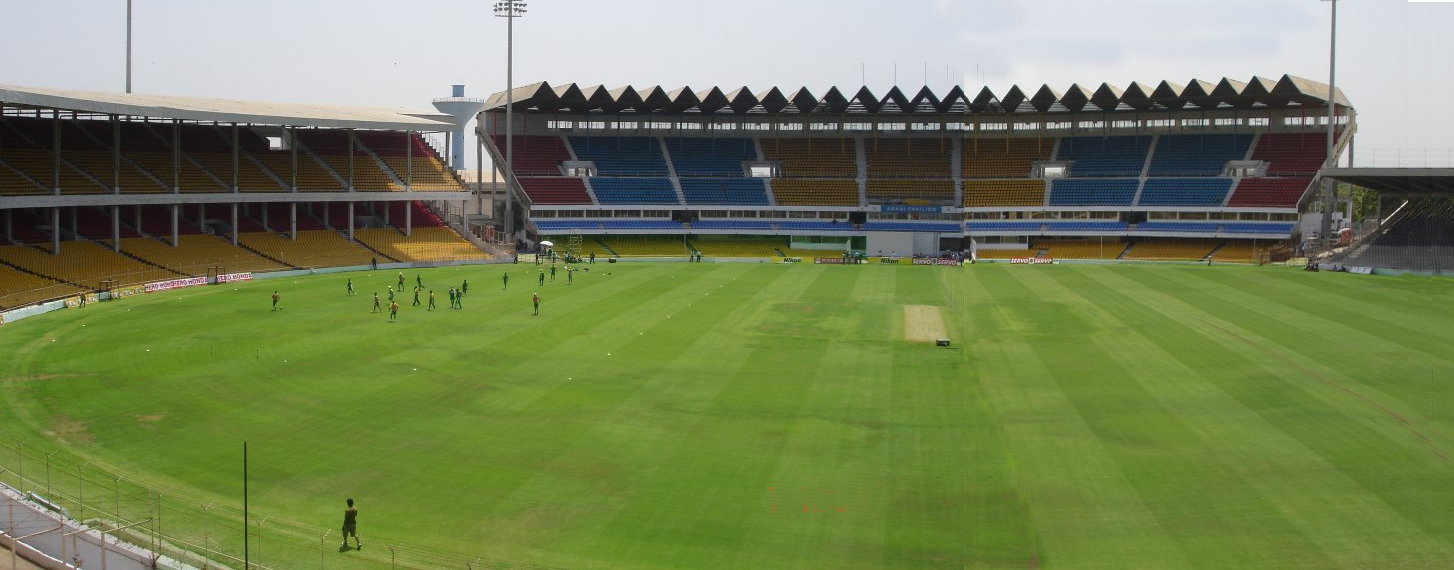
Sardar Patel Stadium (before reconstruction)

In 2006, the stadium became the focal venue of the ICC Champions Trophy and hosted five of the 15 games played. In preparation for the tournament, the stadium was renovated to add three new pitches and a new outfield. Floodlights and covered stands were also introduced at the stadium as a part of the renovation program.

In the 2010 New Zealand tour of India, the first Test of the series was held at the venue, in which Kane Williamson scored a hundred on his Test debut.

The stadium hosted three games during the 2011 Cricket World Cup, including the quarterfinals between Australia and India. Sachin Tendulkar became the first cricketer to score 18,000 runs in ODIs in a game against Australia on 24 March 2011.

=== 2014–2020 (Demolition and construction of New Stadium) ===
The idea to build a new stadium was proposed by Narendra Modi himself who was the president of the Gujarat Cricket Association and the Chief Minister of Gujarat at the same time. Shortly before Modi moved to Delhi after becoming the prime minister of India, there were discussions about adding minor upgrades to the stadium and further developing areas of the structure at the pavilion end. Modi asked officials to build a new, larger stadium instead of pursuing minor renovation work.

In October 2015, the stadium was demolished for reconstruction, though some media referred to it as a renovation. The total cost of reconstruction was estimated to be ₹700 crores (₹7 billion (US$73 million)). However, the final cost was reported at ₹800 crore (US$83 million). The redevelopment, originally planned to be completed in 2019, finished in February 2020, and was named Narendra Modi Stadium.

== Tournament results ==
=== Cricket World Cup ===
Year	Date	Team #1	Team #2	Round	Result
1987 Cricket World Cup	26 October 1987	Zimbabwe	India	Group Stage	India won by 7 wickets
1996 Cricket World Cup	14 February 1996	New Zealand	England	Group Stage	New Zealand won by 11 runs
2011 Cricket World Cup	21 February 2011	Australia	Zimbabwe	Group Stage	Australia won by 91 runs
2011 Cricket World Cup	4 March 2011	Zimbabwe	New Zealand	Group Stage	New Zealand won by 10 wickets
2011 Cricket World Cup	24 March 2011	Australia	India	Quarter-Final	India won by 5 wickets

=== ICC Champions Trophy ===
Year	Date	Team #1	Team #2	Round	Result
2006 ICC Champions Trophy	8 October 2006	Zimbabwe	West Indies	Qualifying round	West Indies won by 9 wickets
2006 ICC Champions Trophy	10 October 2006	Sri Lanka	Zimbabwe	Qualifying round	Sri Lanka won by 144 runs
2006 ICC Champions Trophy	21 October 2006	England	Australia	Group Stage	Australia won by 6 wickets
2006 ICC Champions Trophy	26 October 2006	India	West Indies	Group Stage	West Indies won by 3 wickets
2006 ICC Champions Trophy	28 October 2006	West Indies	England	Group Stage	England won by 3 wickets

== World Cup matches ==
Erstwhile Sardar Patel Stadium had hosted matches of World Cups:

=== 1987 Cricket World Cup ===
26 October 1987
Scorecard

Zimbabwe; 191/7 (50 overs)	v	India; 194/3 (42 overs)
Kevin Arnott 60 (126); Chetan Sharma 2/41 (10 overs)		Navjot Sidhu 55 (61); Peter Rawson 2/46 (8 overs)

India won by 7 wickets
Sardar Patel Stadium, Ahmedabad, India
Umpires: David Archer (West Indies) and Dickie Bird (England)
Player of the match: Kapil Dev (India)

=== 1996 Cricket World Cup ===
14 February
Scorecard

New Zealand; 239/6 (50 overs)	v	England; 228/9 (50 overs)
Nathan Astle 101 (132); Graeme Hick 2/45 (9 overs)		Graeme Hick 85 (102); Dion Nash 3/26 (7 overs)

New Zealand won by 11 runs
Gujarat Stadium, Motera, Ahmedabad
Umpires: B. C. Cooray (SL) and Steve Randell (NZ)
Player of the match: Nathan Astle (NZ)

=== 2011 Cricket World Cup ===
21 February 2011 (D/N)

Australia; 262/6 (50 overs)	v	Zimbabwe; 171 (46.2 overs)
Shane Watson 79 (92); Christopher Mpofu 2/58 (9 overs)		Graeme Cremer 37 (51); Mitchell Johnson 4/19 (9.2 overs)

Australia won by 91 runs
Sardar Patel Stadium, Motera, Ahmedabad
Attendance: 18,569
Umpires: Richard Kettleborough (Eng) and Asoka de Silva (NZ)
Player of the match: Shane Watson (Aus)

- Australia won the toss and elected to bat

4 March 2011 (D/N)

Zimbabwe; 162 (46.2 overs)	v	New Zealand; 166/0 (33.3 overs)
Brendan Taylor 44 (57); Tim Southee 3/29 (9.2 overs)		Martin Guptill 86* (108)

New Zealand won by 10 wickets
Sardar Patel Stadium, Motera, Ahmedabad
Attendance: 7,000
Umpires: Aleem Dar and Marais Erasmus
Player of the match: Martin Guptill (NZ)

- Zimbabwe won the toss and chose to bat first

24 March 2011 (D/N)

Australia; 260/6 (50 overs)	v	India; 261/5 (47.4 overs)
Ricky Ponting 104 (118); Yuvraj Singh 2/44 (10 overs)		Yuvraj Singh 57* (65); David Hussey 1/19 (5 overs)

India won by 5 wickets
Sardar Patel Stadium, Motera, Ahmedabad
Attendance: 51,000
Umpires: Ian Gould and Marais Erasmus
Player of the match: Yuvraj Singh (Ind)

- Australia won the toss and chose to bat first
- Sachin Tendulkar completed 18,000 runs in his ODI career in the match.

== Notable achievements made in the stadium ==
- In 1986, Sunil Gavaskar completed 10,000 runs in Test cricket, while playing against Pakistan.
- In 1994, Kapil Dev took his 432nd wicket in Test cricket to surpass Richard Hadlee's tally of most Test wickets.
- In October 1999, Sachin Tendulkar scored his first Test double hundred against New Zealand.
- On 20 November 2009, Tendulkar passed thirty thousand runs at international level.
- In 2011, Tendulkar became the first-ever cricketer to score 18,000 runs in ODI format in a match against Australia during the Cricket World Cup.
- In 2008, AB de Villiers scored his maiden Test double century.

== Records ==
=== Test match records ===
- Highest innings total: Sri Lanka 760/7d – India v Sri Lanka, 2nd inning, 16 November 2009.
- Lowest innings total: India 76 – India v South Africa, 1st inning, 3 April 2008.
- Highest individual score: Mahela Jayawardene 275 (435) (4s-27 6s-1) – Sri Lanka v India, 16 November 2009.

=== One Day International match records ===
- Highest total: South Africa 365/2 – India v South Africa, 1st innings, 27 February 2010.
- Lowest total: Zimbabwe 85 – Zimbabwe v West Indies, 1st innings, 8 October 2006.

== See also ==
- List of cricket grounds by capacity
- List of stadiums in India
- List of international cricket grounds in India
- Cricket in India
- Sport in India
- Sports in Gujarat
- Indian Premier League

Preceded by Lord's	Cricket World Cup; Final Venue; 2023	Succeeded by TBD
