= Räty =

Räty is a Finnish surname which may refer to:

- Aatu Räty (born 2002), Finnish ice hockey player
- Arto Räty (born 1955), Finnish soldier
- Aku Räty (born 2002), Finnish ice hockey player
- Jorma Räty (1946–2007), Finnish weightlifter and bodybuilder
- Laura Räty (born 1977), Finnish politician
- Noora Räty (born 1989), Finnish ice hockey goaltender
- Otto Räty (born 1992), Finnish ice hockey defenceman
- Seppo Räty (born 1962), Finnish javelin thrower

== See also ==
- Rati (given name)
- Ratty (disambiguation)
