= Dadra and Nagar Haveli Cricket Association =

Cricket governing body

- Sport: Cricket
- Jurisdiction: Dadra and Nagar Haveli
- Abbreviation: DNHCA
- Affiliation: Board of Control for Cricket in India; Gujarat Cricket Association
- Affiliation date: n/a
- Regional affiliation: West Zone
- Location: Silvassa
- President: Mohan S. Delkar
- Secretary: Kaushalbhai Shah

Official website
- www.gcaumpiresacademy.com/ContactUs.aspx
- (India)

Dadra and Nagar Haveli Cricket Association is the governing body of the Cricket activities in the district of Dadra and Nagar Haveli in the Union Territory of Dadra and Nagar Haveli and Daman and Diu in India and the Dadra and Nagar Haveli cricket team. It is not affiliated to the Board of Control for Cricket in India. However it is affiliated to Gujarat Cricket Association as a District Association.
