= 1950–51 Ranji Trophy =

Indian cricket tournament

- The Ranji Trophy
- Administrator: BCCI
- Cricket format: First-class
- Tournament format: Knockout
- Champions: Holkar (3rd title)
- Participants: 20
- Most runs: Chandu Sarwate (Holkar) (699)
- Most wickets: Iqbal Karan (Services) (33)

The 1950–51 Ranji Trophy was the 17th season of the Ranji Trophy. Holkar won the title defeating Gujarat in the final.

== Zonal Matches ==
=== East Zone ===
Round 1
9 Dec 1950 – Cuttack
Orissa | 121 & 128
Bihar | 443
6 Jan 1951 – Dehradun
Uttar Pradesh | 451/5d
Assam | 175 & 68

Round 2
27 Jan 1951 – Jamshedpur
Bihar | 152 & 362
Bengal | 171 & 493
10 Jan 1951 – Dehradun
Uttar Pradesh | 90 & 70/5
Holkar | 248 & 501

Round 3
16 Feb 1951 – Calcutta
Bengal | 447
Holkar | 515 & 153/1

=== South Zone ===
Round 1
22 Dec 1950 – Nagpur
Madhya Pradesh | 151 & 226
Hyderabad | 308 & 73/7
19 Dec 1950 – Bangalore
Mysore | 325 & 312/8d
Madras | 463 & 110/3

Round 2
26 Jan 1951 – Hyderabad
Hyderabad | 353 & 125/3
Madras | 161 & 316

=== North Zone ===
Round 1
9 Dec 1950 – Amritsar
Eastern Punjab | 131 & 199
Services | 282 & 52/0

Round 2
26 Dec 1950 – Patiala
Southern Punjab | 370 & 132/3
Rajputana | 100 & 398
6 Jan 1951 – Delhi
Delhi | 141 & 233
Services | 412/8d

Round 3
27 Jan 1951 – Patiala
Southern Punjab | 302 & 219
Services | 536

=== West Zone ===
Round 1
18 Dec 1950 – Rajkot
Saurashtra | 211 & 164
Baroda | 402

Round 2
10 Jan 1951 – Ahmedabad
Gujarat | 190 & 56/4
Baroda | 98 & 147
22 Dec 1950 – Bombay
Bombay | 725/8d
Maharashtra | 195 & 341/6

Round 3
24 Feb 1951 – Ahmedabad
Gujarat | 505
Bombay | 229 & 110

== Inter-Zonal Knockout matches ==
Semi-finals
26 Feb 1951 – Indore
Holkar | 757
Hyderabad | 277 & 274
10 Mar 1951 – Ahmedabad
Gujarat | 429
Services | 134 & 129

Final
17 Mar 1951 – Indore
Holkar | 429 & 443
Gujarat | 327 & 356

=== Semi-final ===
==== 1st Semi-final ====
26 February – 1 March 1951
Scorecard

| Hyderabad | v | Holkar (H) |
| 277 (106.2 overs); Ali Hussain 121; Arjun Naidu 4/48 (17.2 overs) | | 757 (232.3 overs); Khandu Rangnekar 217; Ghulam Ahmed 4/245 (92.3 overs) |
| 274 (93.3 overs); Ali Hussain 70; Arjun Naidu 4/91 (29 overs) |

Holkar won by an innings 206 runs
Yeshwant Club Ground, Indore

==== 2nd Semi-final ====
10–13 March 1951
Scorecard

| Gujarat (H) | v | Services |
| 429 (142.3 overs); Gogumal Kishenchand 160; Inderjit Barhoke 4/87 (29.3 overs) | | 134 (57.5 overs); Maurice Cohen 36; Jasu Patel 8/53 (17.5 overs) |
| | | 129 (49.3 overs); V. M. Muddiah 37; Jasu Patel 5/28 (11 overs) |

Gujarat won by an innings and 166 runs
Police Parade Ground, Ahmedabad

- Gogumal Kishenchand (Gujarat) and Hemu Adhikari (Services) passed 4,000 and 5,000 runs respectively in first-class cricket.

=== Final ===
17–21 March 1951
Scorecard

| Holkar (H) | v | Gujarat |
| 429 (137.5 overs); Mushtaq Ali 187; Vinoo Mankad 6/132 (45.5 overs) | | 327 (138 overs); Gogumal Kishenchand 98; Arjun Naidu 4/96 (36 overs) |
| 443 (185 overs); Chandu Sarwate 234; Vinoo Mankad 4/135 (64 overs) | | 356 (105 overs); Jasu Patel 152; Hiralal Gaekwad 4/109 (35 overs) |

Holkar won by 189 runs
Yeshwant Club Ground, Indore
Umpires: Bapu Joshi and M. M. Naidu

- Gujarat won the toss and decided to field.

== Scorecards and averages ==
- CricketArchive
