= Luha =

Luha can refer to:

- Luha (river), river in Ukraine
- "Luha" (song), song by Aegis from their 1998 album Halik
- Prabin Luha (born 1995), Indian cricketer
