= Prehistory and protohistory of Himachal Pradesh =

The state of Himachal Pradesh in India has been considered to be inhabited by humans since the origin of civilization. It has a rich and varied history which can be divided into several distinct eras.

== Prehistory and protohistory ==
Many evidences have been came under consideration that nearly 2 million years ago man lived on the foothills of Himachal Pradesh. Some of these places are-

- The Bangana valley of Kangra
- Sirsa valley of Nalagarh
- Markanda valley of Sirmour

The foothills of the state are thought to be inhabited by the people from Indus Valley Civilization which flourished between the timeperiod of 2250 B.C. to 1750 B.C. People of Indus valley civilization pushed the original inhabitants of Ganga plains also known as Kolorian people towards the north. They moved towards the hills of Himachal Pradesh where they could led a comfortable life and preserve their way of living.

In the Vedas these have been referred as the Dasas, Dasyus and Nishadas while later they have been known as the Kinnars, Nagas and Yakshas. The Kols or Mundas are considered to be the original migrants to the hills of present Himachal.

The second stage of migrants came in the form of Mongoloid people known as Bhotas and Kiratas. At last the third and most significant wave of migrants in the form of the Aryans came into being, who left their Central Asian home. These laid down the base for the history and culture of Himachal Pradesh.
