= Sardar Vallabhbhai Patel Stadium, Navrangpura =

Stadium in Navrangpura, Ahmedabad, India

Coordinates: 23.0422°N 72.5644°E

Sardar Vallabhai Patel cricket Stadium
- Interactive map of Sardar Vallabhai Patel cricket Stadium

Ground information
- Location: Navrangpura, Ahmedabad
- Country: India
- Establishment: 1960
- Owner: Ahmedabad Municipal Corporation
- Architect: Charles Correa
- Operator: Gujarat Cricket Association
- Tenants: Gujarat cricket team Government of Gujarat
- End names
- Ahmedabad Municipal Corporation End; Azhar Altaf Pavilion End

International information
- Only men's ODI: 25 November 1981: India v England
- First women's Test: 3–5 February 1984: India v Australia
- Last women's Test: 23–25 February 1985: India v New Zealand
- As of 8 December 2019; Source: ESPNcricinfo profile

Sardar Vallabhbhai Patel Stadium or SVP Stadium for short, sometimes referred as Sports Club of Gujarat Stadium; is an Indian sports stadium located in the Navrangpura district of Ahmedabad, Gujarat, India. The stadium hosted the first One Day International match played in India. It is owned by Ahmedabad Municipal Corporation. It is mainly used for cricket, but it has also played host to a number of events arranged by the Government of Gujarat.

== History ==
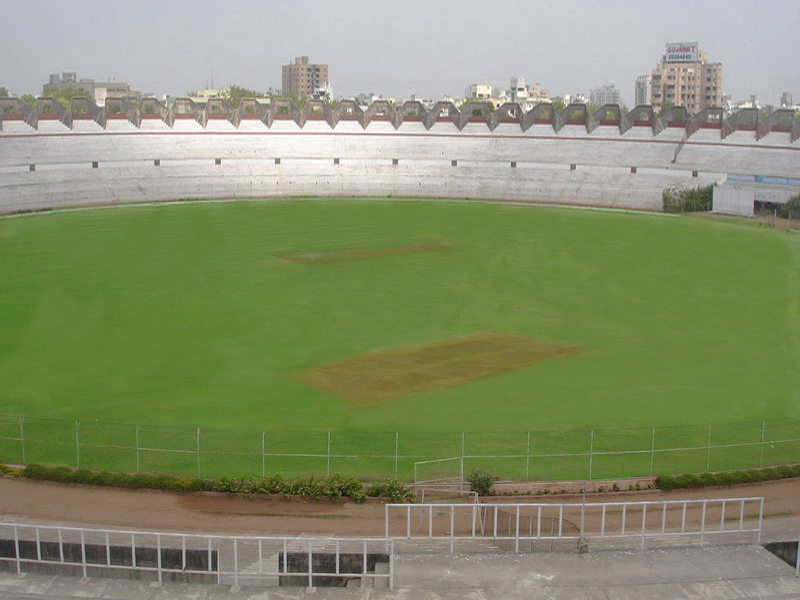
Sardar Patel Stadium in Navrangpura, Ahmedabad

In the early 1950s, the province of Bombay gifted 67,000 square metres (80,000 sq yd) of land to the Cricket Club of Ahmedabad (CCA) to construct a cricket stadium and a clubhouse. CCA handed over the project as well as the land to the Ahmedabad Municipal Corporation (AMC) at a token price. It was agreed to have separate management for the Stadium and the Club House and that the original members of the CCA would form a new club, christened The Sports Club of Gujarat Ltd.

Sheth Chinubhai Chimanbhai, a leading industrialist and then Mayor of Ahmedabad, hired architect Charles Correa to design both the stadium and the clubhouse. The early idea for the construction of the stadium was conceived and structural engineer Mahendra Raj served as the consulting engineer.

The construction of the SVP stadium began in 1959. Due to financial issues, the stadium was partially completed in 1966 with only a roof-covered south pavilion. Later the stands around the entire stadium were built by the 1980s.

=== Cricket ===
The stadium hosted its only One Day International (ODI) match and first played in India on 25 November 1981. The match was played between India and England. The match was reduced to 46 overs. India scored 156 for 7. Dilip Vengsarkar top scored with 46 runs. England replied with 160 for 5 and won the match by five wickets and 13 balls to spare. Mike Gatting and Ian Botham were unbeaten on 47 and 25 respectively.

Once Motera stadium came up in Motera in 1982, the stadium has not been used for international cricket matches. The Motera Stadium now hosts all ODI matches and Test matches in the city. The Motera stadium was rebuilt in 2020 and renamed Narendra Modi Stadium.

==== Indian Cricket League ====
During 2008 season of Indian Cricket League (ICL), the stadium was chosen as one of the venues for the tournament, other venues being Hyderabad, Gurgaon and Panchkula. Prior to the tournament, the ICL spent ₹100 million (₹10 crore) for renovation of the stadium and ₹30-40 million for floodlights, apart from improving the pitch, outfield, and dressing rooms.

The stadium hosted 12 matches during the T20 tournament. The stadium was scheduled to host all seven matches of ICL World Series, but the tournament was canceled after four matches due to the Mumbai terrorist attacks.

=== Recreational use ===
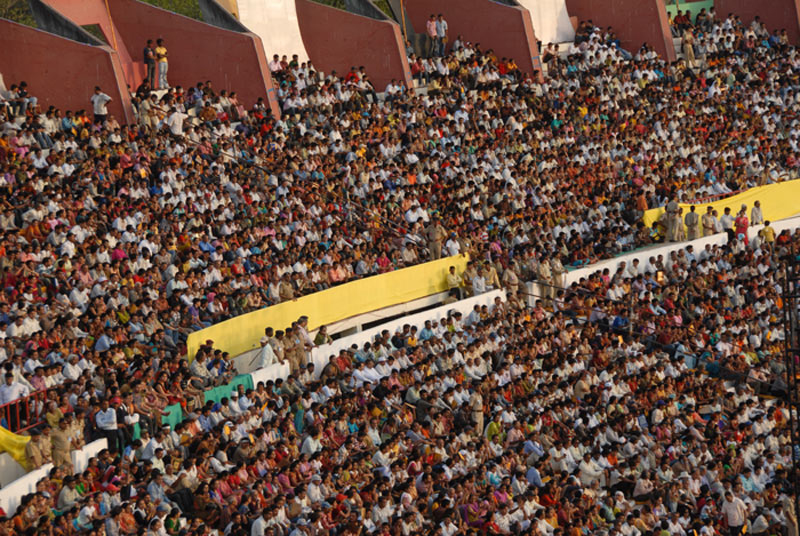
Thousands of spectators attended the Swarnim Gujarat celebrations

The stadium is a popular place for recreational use including hosting political and religious events as well as concerts.

The stadium hosted the Swarnim Gujarat Fest, the golden jubilee celebrations of the foundation of Gujarat, on 30 April and 1 May 2010. The stadium was renovated at the cost of ₹5 crore (US$520,000). The event was attended by thousands.

The seating arena was closed in 2020 and was opened for the 11th edition of Khel Mahakhumb, state level multi-sports tournament in March 2022, after repairs.

=== Restoration proposal ===
In July 2020, the Getty Foundation announced that SVP Stadium was one of 13 significant twentieth-century buildings in the world and announced a grant. In 2022, World Monuments Fund (WMF) and National Centre for Safety of Heritage Structures, Department of Civil Engineering at Indian Institute of Technology Madras submitted the Comprehensive Conservation Management Plan for the stadium to AMC in March 2023. The stadium was also included in the 2020 World Monuments Watch. The repair and restoration is estimated to cost ₹50 crore (US$5.2 million).

There were reports of its demolition proposal to make space for a new stadium under the master plan for Gujarat's bid for the 2036 Summer Olympics. Another proposal was to retain the stadium and build additional sports facilities for the Olympics.

== Architecture ==
The stadium is spread over an area of 67,000 square metres. It used a complex folded plate structural system, the first such building in India. The folded plate cantilever roof above the pavilion was 20 m wide and 326 feet long. It was made of reinforced cement concrete and was the longest such span in the world in 1963. The exterior has geometric concrete frames which creates open space below the seats for the spectators.

The stadium has a seating capacity of 40,000 to 50,000 spectators.

It is equipped with floodlights for day-and-night games.

== Home ground ==
The stadium is one of the home grounds of the Gujarat cricket team that plays in the domestic tournament of Ranji Trophy. It is a regular venue during the Indian domestic cricket season.

== See also ==
- Narendra Modi Stadium
