= Prabesh Gurung =

Indian cricketer (born 1992)

Personal information
- Born: 28 June 1992 (age 34); Sadam, Sikkim
- Source: Cricinfo, 14 November 2019

Prabesh Gurung (born 28 June 1992) is an Indian cricketer. He made his Twenty20 debut on 14 November 2019, for Sikkim in the 2019–20 Syed Mushtaq Ali Trophy.
