= Ratty =

Ratty may refer to:

- the Ratty, a colloquialism for the Sharpe Refrectory, the primary dining hall at Brown University.
- Ratty (railway), a heritage railway in Cumbria, England
- Ratty, a character in the novel The Wind in the Willows by Kenneth Grahame
- Ratty, a pseudonym of some members of Scooter, best known for the single "Sunrise (Here I Am)"
- Ratty, a Disney character from the Donald Duck universe
- Ratty (film), a 1986 Swedish animated feature film

== See also ==
- Rati (given name)
- Raty
