= Moakumzuk Tzudir =

Indian cricketer (born 1995)

Moakümzük Tzüdir
Personal information
- Born: 16 October 1995 (age 31)
- Source: ESPNcricinfo, 5 October 2019

Moakümzük Tzüdir (born 16 October 1995) is an Indian cricketer. He made his List A debut on 4 October 2019, for Nagaland in the 2019–20 Vijay Hazare Trophy. He made his Twenty20 debut on 8 November 2019, for Nagaland in the 2019–20 Syed Mushtaq Ali Trophy.
