= Parth Chauhan =

Indian cricketer (born 1995)

Personal information
- Full name: Parth Raju Chauhan
- Born: 4 July 1995 (age 31); Bhavnagar, Gujarat, India
- Source: Cricinfo, 8 November 2019

Parth Chauhan (born 4 July 1995) is an Indian cricketer. He made his Twenty20 debut on 8 November 2019, for Saurashtra in the 2019–20 Syed Mushtaq Ali Trophy. He made his List A debut on 25 February 2021, for Saurashtra in the 2020–21 Vijay Hazare Trophy.
