= Tejosel Yiethun =

Indian cricketer (born 1992)

Personal information
- Full name: Tejosel Phelutso Yiethun
- Born: 22 November 1992 (age 33); Dimapur, Nagaland
- Batting: Left-handed
- Bowling: Right-arm medium-fast

Domestic team information
- Years: Team
- 2019/20: Nagaland
- Source: Cricinfo, 2 October 2019

Tejosel Yiethun (born 22 November 1992) is an Indian cricketer. He made his List A debut on 2 October 2019, for Nagaland in the 2019–20 Vijay Hazare Trophy. He made his Twenty20 debut on 12 November 2019, for Nagaland in the 2019–20 Syed Mushtaq Ali Trophy. He made his first-class debut on 25 December 2019, for Nagaland in the 2019–20 Ranji Trophy.
