= Kunwar Bidhuri =

Indian cricketer (born 1996)

Personal information
- Born: 24 April 1996 (age 30); Delhi, India
- Source: ESPNcricinfo, 28 November 2018

Kunwar Bidhuri (born 24 April 1996) is an Indian cricketer. He made his first-class debut for Delhi in the 2018–19 Ranji Trophy on 28 November 2018. He made his List A debut on 10 October 2019, for Delhi in the 2019–20 Vijay Hazare Trophy. He made his Twenty20 debut on 22 November 2019, for Delhi in the 2019–20 Syed Mushtaq Ali Trophy.
