= Sabin Chettri =

Indian cricketer (born 1994)

Personal information
- Born: 6 July 1994 (age 32); Gangtok, Sikkim
- Source: Cricinfo, 15 November 2019

Sabin Chettri (born 6 July 1994) is an Indian cricketer. He made his Twenty20 debut on 15 November 2019, for Sikkim in the 2019–20 Syed Mushtaq Ali Trophy.
