= Hokaito Zhimomi =

Indian cricketer (born 1986)

Personal information
- Full name: Hokaito Huzheto Zhimomi
- Born: 24 September 1986 (age 40); Dimapur, Nagaland, India
- Height: 5 ft 10 in (1.78 m)
- Batting: Right-handed
- Bowling: Left-arm medium
- Role: Batsman

Domestic team information
- Years: Team
- 2008: Kolkata Knight Riders
- 2012–2013: Assam
- 2018–present: Nagaland
- FC debut: 2 November 2012 Assam v Tripura

Career statistics
Competition	FC	LA	T20
Matches	37	30	32
Runs scored	1,285	318	272
Batting average	22.15	15.90	13.60
100s/50s	2/5	0/1	0/1
Top score	177	72*	55*
Balls bowled	330	415	54
Wickets	1	9	3
Bowling average	216.00	37.44	27.00
5 wickets in innings	0	0	0
10 wickets in match	0	-	0
Best bowling	1/10	2/15	2/7
Catches/stumpings	14/0	9/0	9/0
- Source: ESPNcricinfo, 24 April 2025

Hokaito Zhimomi (born 24 September 1986) is an Indian first-class cricketer from Nagaland, who played for Assam and Nagaland. He is from Sangtamtila village of Dimapur district.

He was part of Kolkata Knight Riders in the first edition of IPL, He was never part of the playing 11.

== Career ==
He played his junior and club cricket in Kolkata, representing Dalhousie Athletic Club. He was also a part of the extended IPL team Kolkata Knight Riders in 2009.

Ahead of the 2018–19 Ranji Trophy, he transferred from Assam to Nagaland. He made his List A debut for Nagaland in the 2018–19 Vijay Hazare Trophy on 19 September 2018. He made his Twenty20 debut on 8 November 2019, for Nagaland in the 2019–20 Syed Mushtaq Ali Trophy.
