= Jitesh Saroha =

Indian cricketer (born 1996)

Personal information
- Born: 12 January 1996 (age 30)
- Source: ESPNcricinfo, 25 November 2019

Jitesh Saroha (born 12 January 1996) is an Indian cricketer. He made his Twenty20 debut on 25 November 2019, for Haryana in the 2019–20 Syed Mushtaq Ali Trophy.
