= Gujarat Cricket Association =

Governing body of cricket in Gujarat, India

- Sport: Cricket
- Jurisdiction: Gujarat, India
- Abbreviation: GCA
- Founded: 1934
- Affiliation: Board of Control for Cricket in India
- Regional affiliation: West
- Headquarters: Narendra Modi Stadium, India
- Location: Motera, Ahmedabad, Ahmedabad district, Gujarat, India
- President: Dhanraj Nathwani
- Secretary: Ashok Brahmbhatt

Official website
- www.gujaratcricketassociation.com
- (India)

The Gujarat Cricket Association (GCA) is the governing body of cricket activities in the state of Gujarat in India. Its Gujarat cricket team and Gujarat women's cricket team represent Gujarat in domestic cricket. The GCA is affiliated to the Board of Control for Cricket in India (BCCI).

It owns the world's largest stadium, which is named after the current prime minister of India, Narendra Modi. The venue is the premium stadium of the nation.

As a member of the BCCI, the GCA has the authority to select players, umpires, and officials to participate in state events and exercises total control over them in Gujarat. Without its recognition, no competitive cricket involving GCA-contracted players can be hosted within the state of Gujarat or anywhere in India.

== History ==
Its men's team first time appeared in the Ranji Trophy in the season 1950/51. Holkar won the high-scoring match by 189 runs, the match featured a double century by Holkar's Chandu Sarwate and a fighting 152 by Gujarati off-spinner Jasu Patel (who averaged 12.78 in 87 innings). Their second appearance came after 66 years in season 2016/17. Captain Parthiv Patel scored 90 and 143 and lead the team to win the Ranji Trophy finals by 5 wickets.

It built an arena at Motera near Sabarmati river in 1982, named it Sardar Patel stadium in honour of India's first home minister Sardar Patel. The organisation hosted many bilateral cricket matches and some World Cup games at the venue. GCA in 2015 scrapped it to build the world's largest cricket stadium, which was built in 2021 and named as "Narendra Modi Stadium" after current PM Narendra Modi. In 2021 then president of India Ram Nath Kovind inaugurated the arena. It can host 134000 spectators and it is the world's second largest stadium by seating capacity.

The organization's men's team won its first Vijay Hazare trophy in season 2015/16.

== Home grounds ==
- Narendra Modi Stadium, Ahmedabad
- Sardar Vallabhbhai Patel Stadium, Ahmedabad,
- KDCA Cricket Stadium, Nadiad
- CB Patel International Cricket Stadium, Surat
- Bilakhiya Stadium, Vapi
- Lalabhai Contractor Stadium, Surat
- Sardar Vallabhbhai Patel Stadium, Valsad
