= List of United Sikkim FC seasons =

United Sikkim Football Club is an Indian I-League football club based in Gangtok, Sikkim. The club, which was founded in 2008, is the only club from Sikkim to play in the I-League and the second club from North East India. The club which is co-owned by Dubai based Fidelis World, former India football captain Baichung Bhutia, and Indian music singer Shankar Mahadevan, was founded in order to give the people of the Indian state of Sikkim a team.

== Key ==
- P = Played
- W = Games won
- D = Games drawn
- L = Games lost
- F = Goals for
- A = Goals against
- Pts = Points
- Pos = Final position
- IL = I-League
- IL 2 = I-League 2nd Division
- Group = Group stage

1st or W	Winners
2nd or RU	Runners-up
↑	Promoted
↓	Relegated
♦	Top scorer in division

== Seasons ==
Results of league and cup competitions by season
Season	Division	P	W	D	L	F	A	Pts	Pos	Federation Cup	Indian Super Cup	Competition	Result	Name	Goals
Season	League									Federation Cup	Indian Super Cup	Asia		Top goalscorer	
2011	IL 2	13	6	5	2	24	16	23	5th	—	—	—	—	Unknown	
2012	IL 2 ↑	18	10	5	3	40	27	35	1st	Qualifiers	—	—	—	(Nigeria) Daniel Bedemi	14
2012–13	IL↓	0	0	0	0	0	0	0	14th	Group	—	—	—	(Nigeria) Salau Nuruddin	6
2014	IL 2	8	3	1	5	9	12	7	4th	—	—	—	—	Unknown	
2018–19	IL 2	0	0	0	0	0	0	0	0	—	—	—	—	Unknown	
