= Karan Dagar =

Indian cricketer (born 1995)

Personal information
- Born: 25 August 1995 (age 31)
- Source: ESPNcricinfo, 11 November 2019

Karan Dagar (born 25 August 1995) is an Indian cricketer. He made his Twenty20 debut on 11 November 2019, for Delhi in the 2019–20 Syed Mushtaq Ali Trophy.
