= Sardar Vallabhbhai Patel Stadium, Valsad =

Sports stadium in Valsad, Gujarat, India

Coordinates: 20°36′43″N 72°55′49″E

Sardar Vallabhai Patel Stadium
- Location: Valsad, Gujarat
- Country: India
- Establishment: 1960
- Owner: Bulsar District Cricket Association
- Operator: Gujarat Cricket Association
- Tenants: Gujarat cricket team
- As of 20 December 2020; Source: Cricinfo profile

Sardar Vallabhbhai Patel Stadium is an Indian sports stadium located in Valsad, Gujarat. The stadium is one of the home grounds of the Gujarat cricket team which plays in the Ranji Trophy, a domestic cricket tournament. The stadium is owned by Bulsar District Cricket Association, which is affiliated to Gujarat Cricket Association. The stadium comes under the aegis of the West Zone. The stadium is used for cricket matches only during Indian domestic season. It is not used for International cricket matches as of now.
