= Nasir Rasool =

Indian cricketer (born 1993)

Personal information
- Born: 7 October 1993 (age 33); Anantnag, India
- Batting: Right handed
- Bowling: Right arm medium fast

Domestic team information
- Years: Team
- 2019–20: Jammu & Kashmir
- Source: ESPNcricinfo, 11 November 2019

Nasir Rasool (born 7 October 1993) is an Indian cricketer. He made his Twenty20 debut on 11 November 2019, for Jammu & Kashmir in the 2019–20 Syed Mushtaq Ali Trophy.
