= Jahan Uddin (cricketer) =

Indian cricketer (born 1990)

Personal information
- Born: 26 May 1990 (age 36); Sonabarighat, Assam
- Source: ESPNcricinfo, 28 November 2018

Jahan Uddin (born 26 May 1990) is an Indian cricketer. He made his first-class debut for Sikkim in the 2018–19 Ranji Trophy on 28 November 2018. He made his Twenty20 debut on 11 November 2019, for Sikkim in the 2019–20 Syed Mushtaq Ali Trophy.
