= Culture of Himachal Pradesh =

Culture of mountainous Northern Indian state

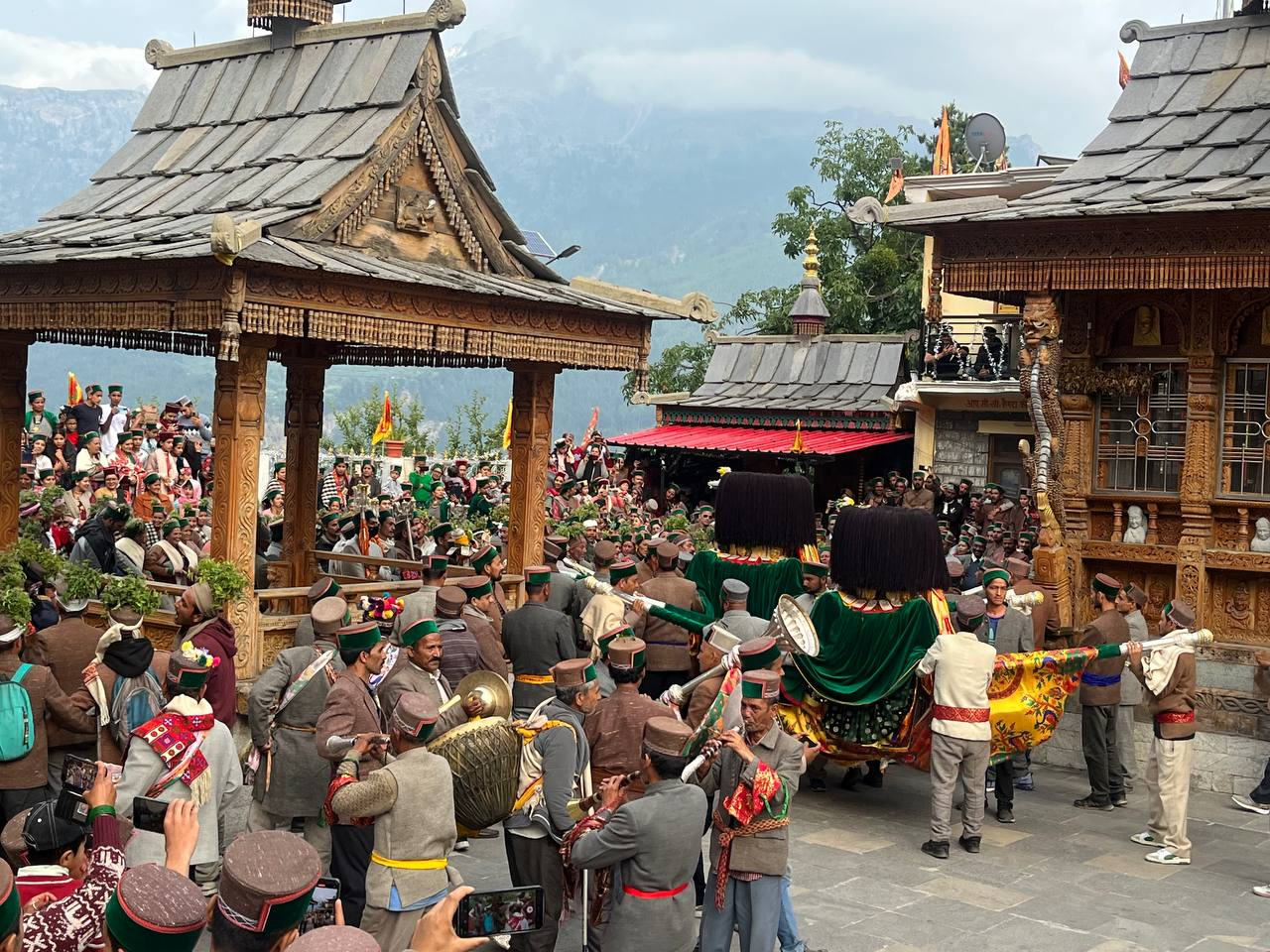
Dakhrain festival in Pangi village of Kinnaur district

The North Indian state of Himachal Pradesh, also known as Devbhoomi and Veerbhoomi, is a state that has remained largely uninfluenced by Western culture.

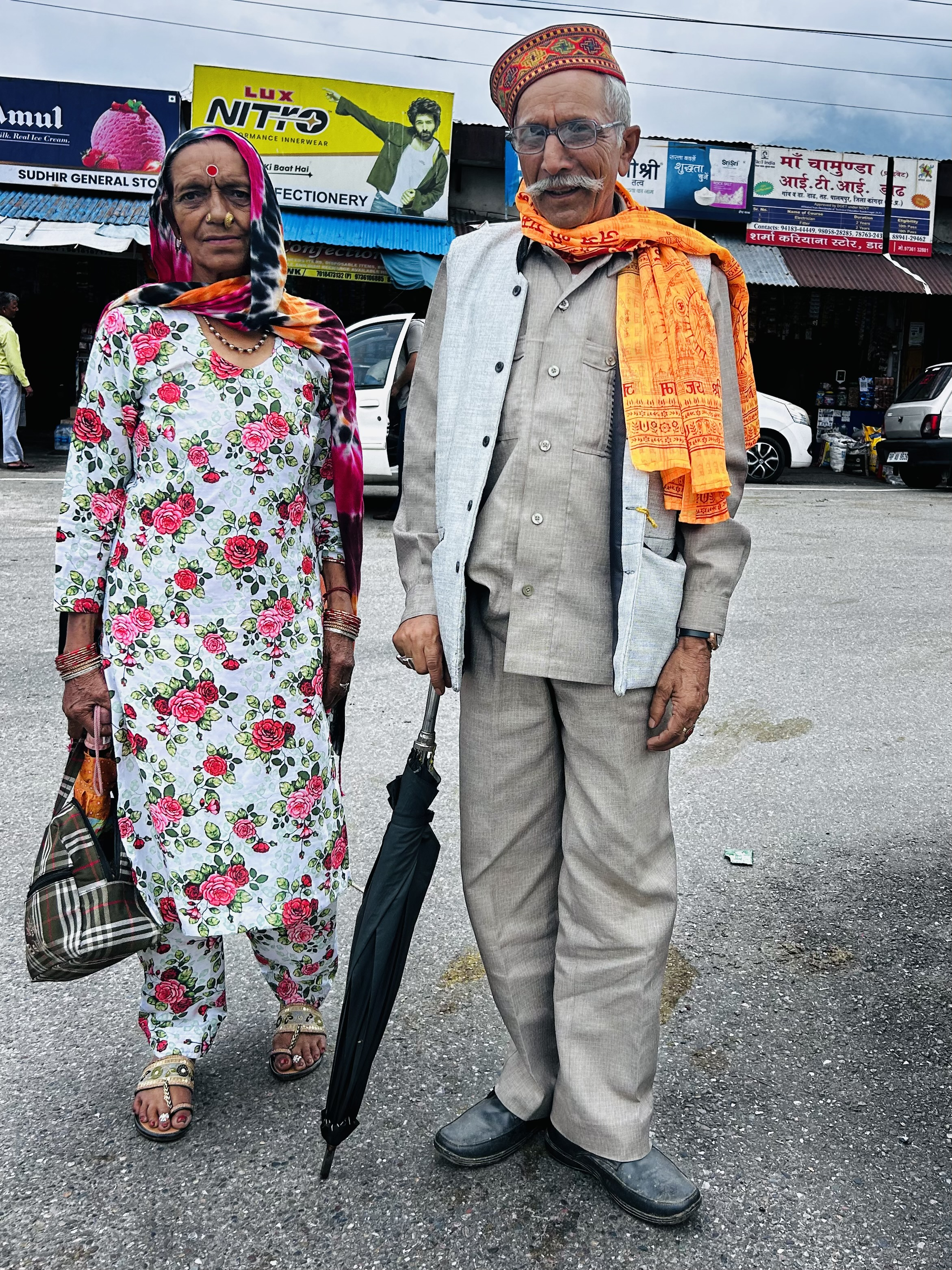
Himachali couple at Chamunda Devi Temple, Dharamshala.

Himachal Pradesh is a multi-religion practising, multicultural and multilingual state. Himachal Pradesh culturally has three regions, Mahasu region, that includes almost whole of the upper Himachal and the second one is the lower Himachal which includes districts of Una, Kangra, Hamirpur, Bilaspur, parts of lower Mandi and parts of Chamba. The third part includes districts of Lahaul and Spiti, whole of the upper Kinnaur and some parts of Chamba. Some of the most commonly spoken languages are Hindi and the various Pahari languages.

Himachal is well known for its handicrafts. The carpets, leather works, shawls, paintings, metalware and woodwork are worth appreciating. Pashmina shawl is one of the products which is highly in demand not only in Himachal but all over the country. Himachali caps are also famous artwork of its people.

Local music and dance reflects the cultural identity of the state. Through their dance and music, they praise their gods during local festivals and other special occasions.

There are a number of fairs and festivals celebrated in Himachal Pradesh, including the temple fairs in nearly every region that are of great significance to this state.

The day-to-day food of Himachalis is very similar to the rest of the north India. They too have lentil, broth, rice, vegetables and bread, etc. As compared to other states in north India, non-vegetarian cuisine is more preferred. Some of the specialities of Himachal include Manee, Madeera, Pateer, Chouck, Bhagjery and chutney of til.

The Annual Festival of Kasol known as Himachal Hills Festival which take place from 27 to 30 December every year in Kasol.

Also, In 2008 the UNESCO-listed Kalka–Shimla narrow-gauge railway as part of Mountain Railways of India.

== People and culture ==
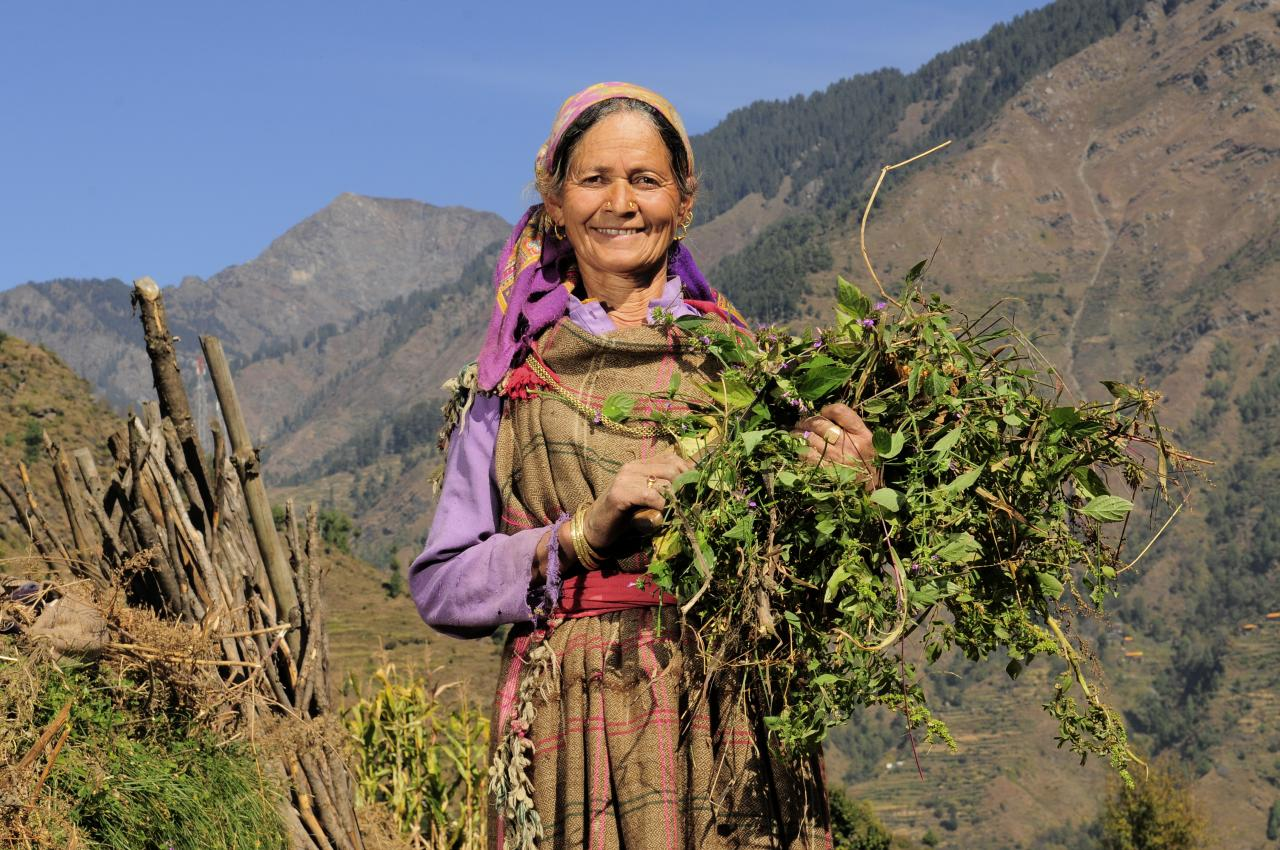
An elderly female farmer wearing traditional clothing and working in her fields in the Kullu district

Around 96% of the population of the state is made up of Hindus. The major communities include Brahmins, Rajputs, Gurjars, Choudhuries, Kanets, Rathees, Kolis, Gaddis, Tanolis, Kinnauris, Pangawalas and Lahaulas. From the alpine pasture regions to the lower regions during the cold winter season are mainly Hindus. The Kinnauris are the inhabitants of Kinnaur who generally practice polyandry and polygamy. The Lahaulas of Lahaul and Spiti, natives of Spiti and Kinnaur region, are mainly Buddhists. A percentage of the people are also Tibetans, Muslims, Christians and Sikhs. The Gaddis, Gurjars, Kinnauris, Tanolis, Pangawalas and Lahaulas compose of tribal communities of the state whereas the Brahmins, Rajputs and Kanets are non-tribal groups of the state.

Though Hindi is the state language, many people speak the various Western Pahari languages. A majority of the population is engaged in agricultural practices, however people are now also moving towards tertiary sectors. As per the traditional dressing norms the dress of the Brahmin male includes kurta, pajama, long traditional coat (jodhpuri), waistcoat, turban and a hand towel. But with the changing time, the dress up of the people has now become a mixed one. Though the above-mentioned style is now hardly followed, people have started wearing western-style clothing.

The typical house is constructed of clay bricks and the roofs are of slate. In some areas the slate roof is also replaced by timber.

== Arts and crafts ==
The handicraft that comes out of this state are the carpets, leather works, shawls, metalware, woodwork and paintings. Pashmina shawl is the pretty product which is in high demand not only in Himachal but all over the country. Colourful Himachali caps are also famous art work of the people. A tribe namely Dom is expert in manufacturing bamboo items like boxes, sofas, chairs, baskets and rack. Metalware of the state include utensils, ritualistic vessels, idols, gold and silver jewelleries.

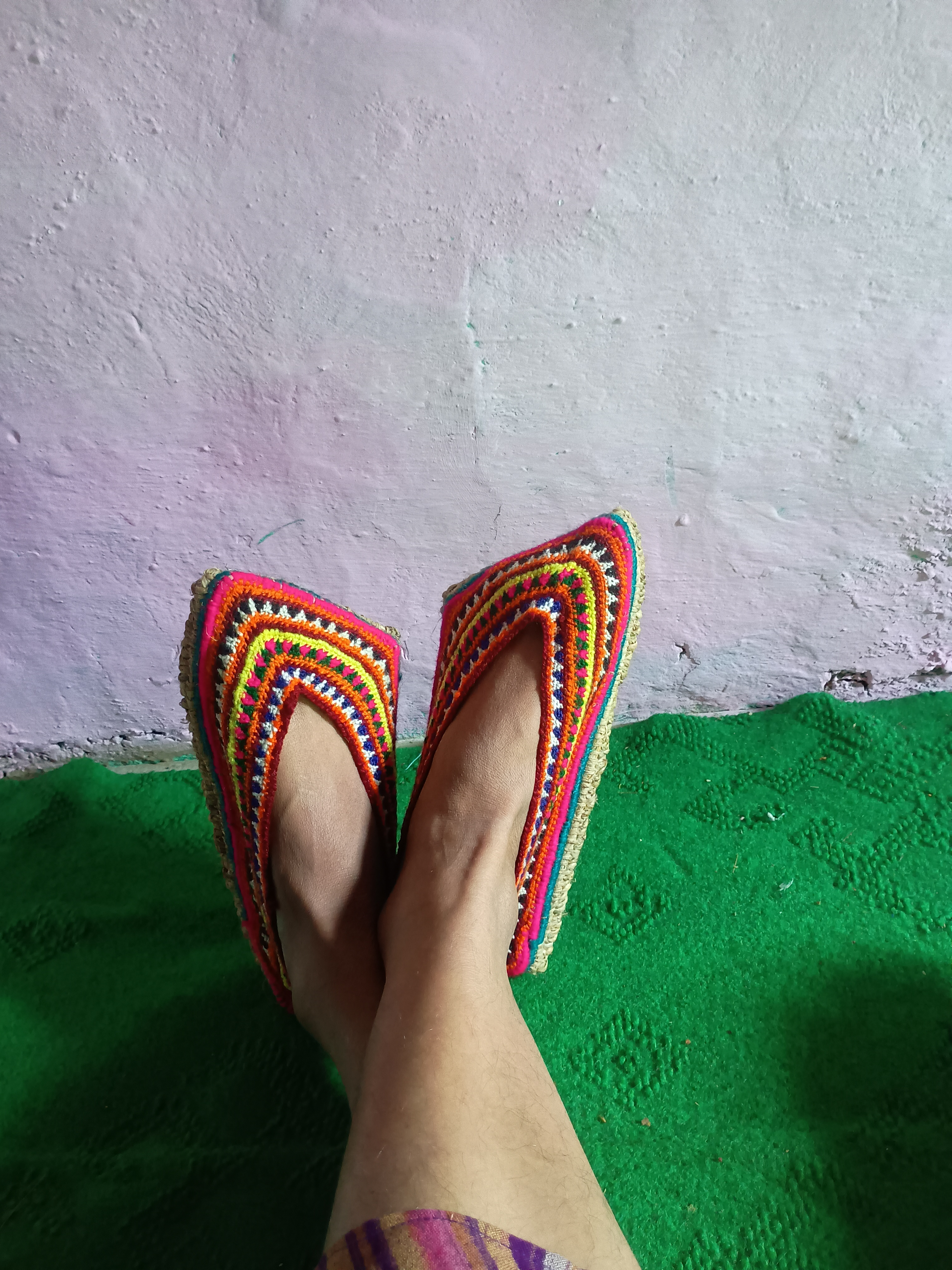
kulluvi culture

Weaving, carving, painting, and chiselling are considered to be the part of the life of Himachalis. Himachal is well known for designing shawls especially in Kullu. The architecture, objects, shops, museums, galleries and craftsmen charm with the variety perfected through time.

Women take an active part in pottery and men in carpentry. For ages, wood is used in Himachal in the construction of homes, idols etc.

== Music and dance ==
Music and dance of Himachal Pradesh reflect its cultural identity. Through their dance and music, they entreat their gods during local festivals and other special occasions. There are also dances that are specific to certain regions of the state.

Some of the dance forms of Himachal are Losar Shona Chuksam (Kinnaur), Dangi (Chamba), Gee Dance and Burah dance (Sirmour), Naati, Kharait, Ujagjama and Chadhgebrikar (Kullu) and Shunto (Lahaul & Spiti). The main dance form of Himachal Pradesh is nati. People of the state generally prefer folk music. There is no classical form of music, as for the Himachal Pradesh is concerned. Himachali dance forms are highly varied and quite complicated. These dances are a very vital part of the tribal life. It reflects the culture and the tradition of Himachal Pradesh. Hardly any festivity here is celebrated without dancing. Some of the dance forms like Dulshol, Dharveshi, Drodi, Dev Naritya, Rakshas Nritya, Dangi, Lasa, Nati and Nagas are danced all over the region.

== Fairs and festivals ==
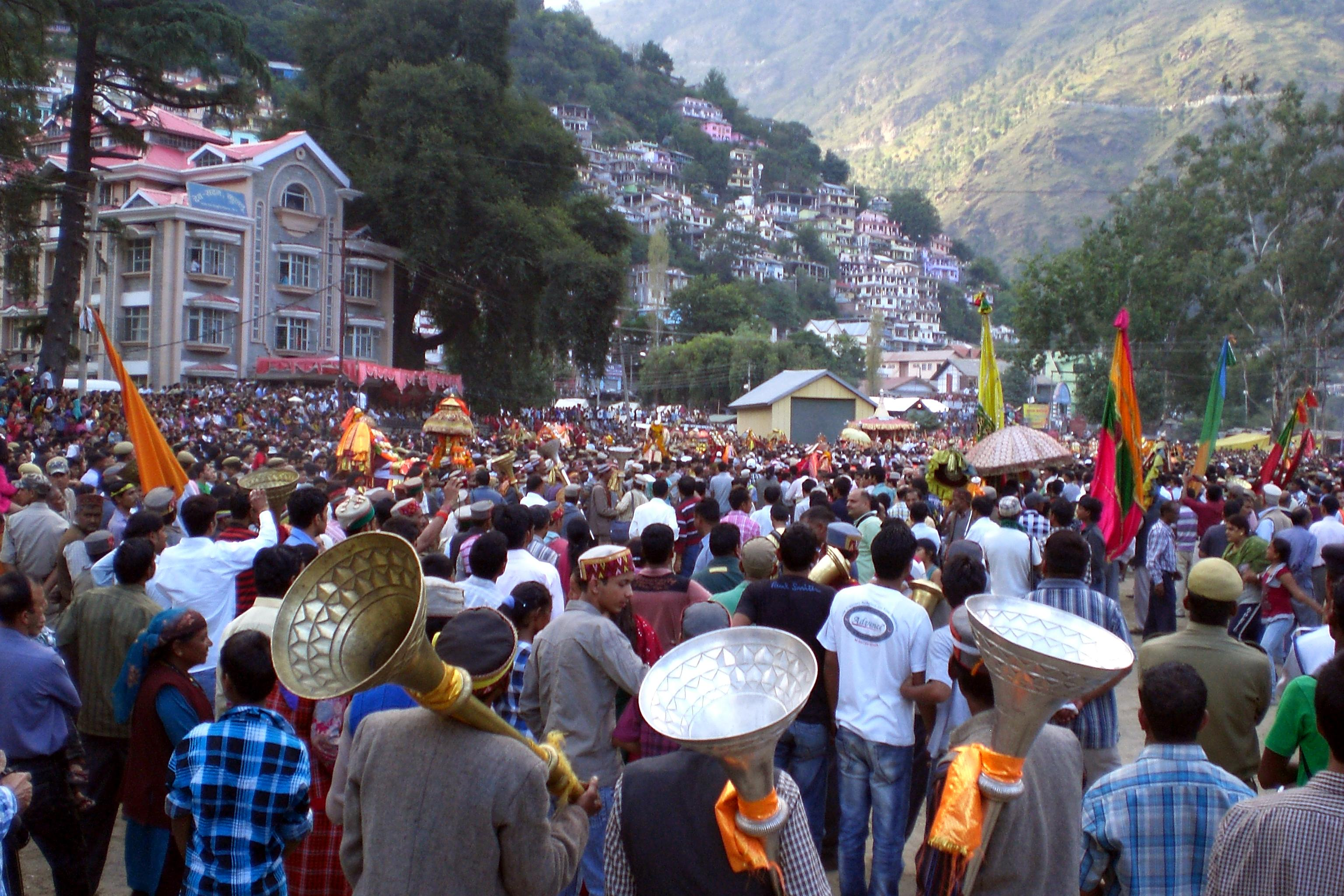
Kullu Dussehra

Apart from the fairs and festivals that are celebrated all over India, there are number of other fairs and festivals also that are at the high point of Himachal Pradesh. These festivals are the time for the Himachalis to adorn colourful dress and accessories and get mixed up with the rest of their kins. Some of these fairs and festivals in the upper regions are the Kullu Dussehra, Shivratri Fair (Mandi), Shoolini Mela (Solan), Minjar Fair (Chamba), Mani Mahesh Chhari Yatra (Chamba), Renuka fair (Sirmaur), Lavi Trade Fair (Rampur), Vrajeshwari fair (Kangra), Jwalamukhi Fair (Jwalamukhi), Holi Fair (Sujanpur Tira), and Naina Devi Fair (Bilaspur), Fulaich (Kinnaur valley), and Ladarcha (Spiti). In the lower regions of Himachal are temple Fairs in Una District such as the Peeplo Fair, the Bharoli Bhagaur Fair, the 'Mairi' Guruduwara Fair, the 'Chintpurni' temple Fair, the 'Kamakhya temple' Fair, including the annual Himachal Hill Festival in the village Polian Purohitan during the fourth week of October. The centuries-old Sair festival is celebrated mainly in Shimla, Kangra, Mandi, Kullu and Solan districts every year in mid-September. It is celebrated to mark the end of the crop harvest and also the rakhi thread are removed and offered to the mother sairi.

== Food ==
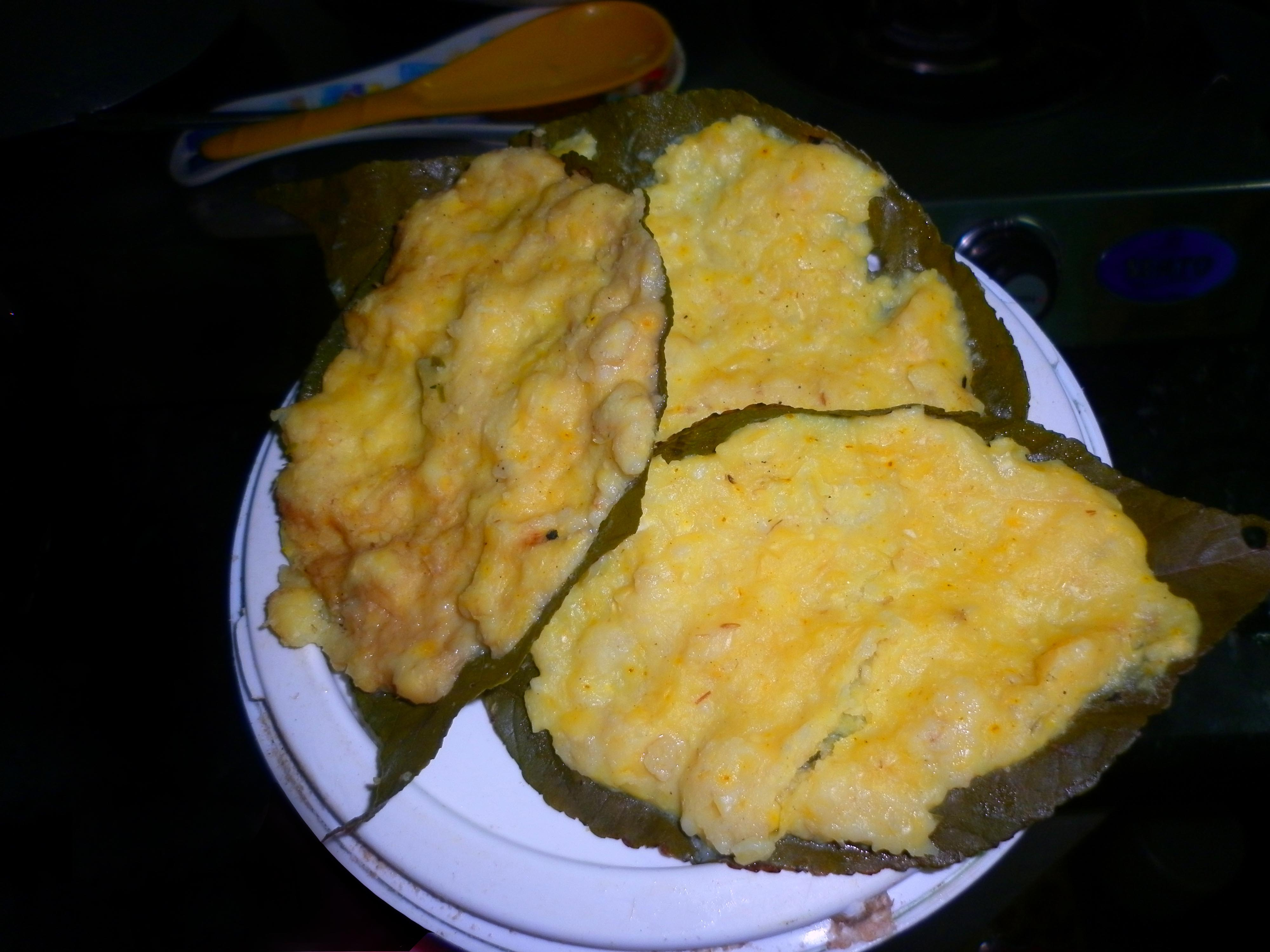
Pachole

The day-to-day food of Himachalis is very similar to the rest of north India. They too have lentil, broth, rice, vegetables and bread, Rajmaha, Sidhu.

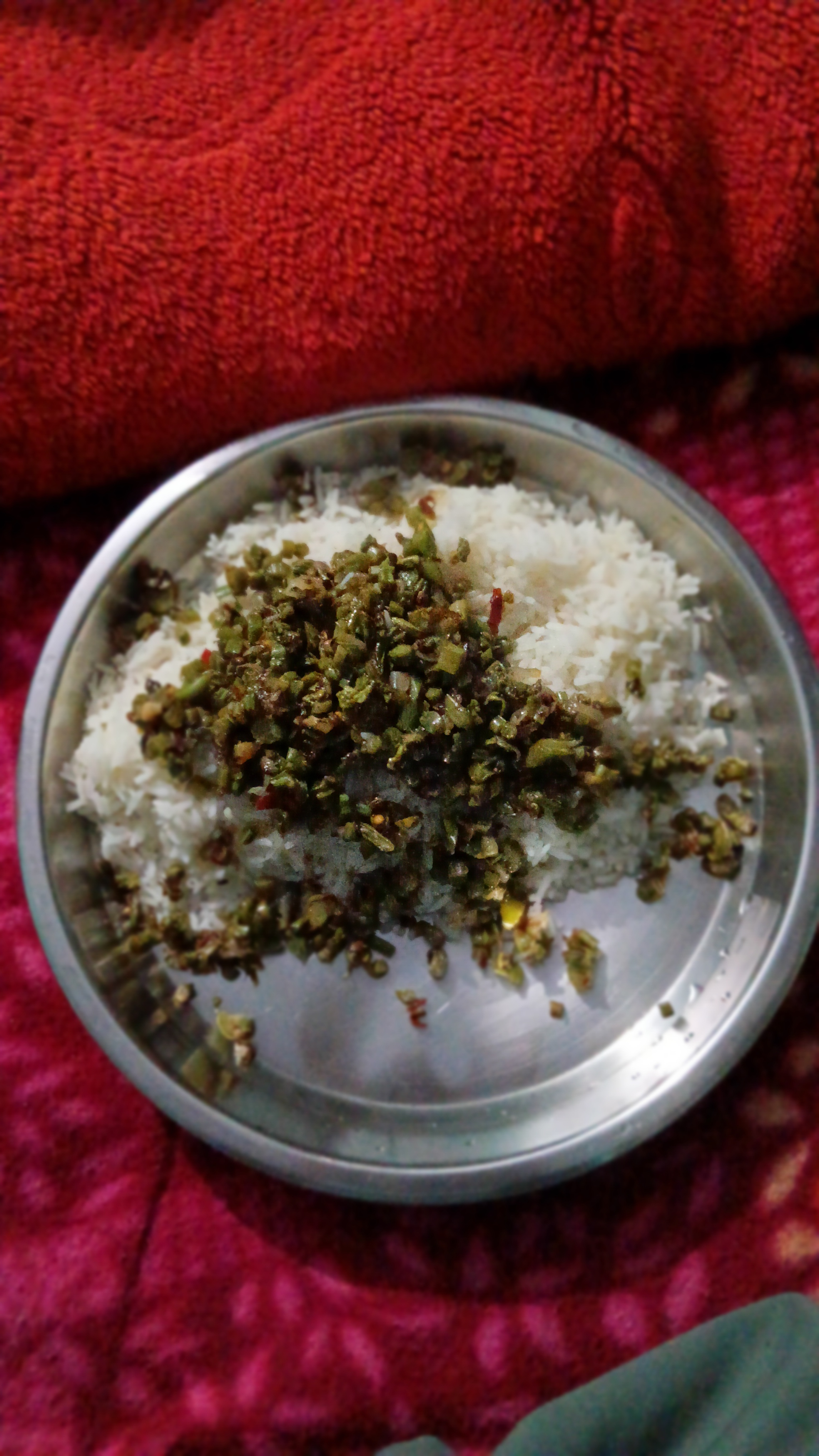
Fiddel fern a wild vegetable found naturally in Himachal Pradesh near water resources and we can eat this with rotis and rice

As compared to other states in north India non-vegetarian cuisine is preferred. Traditionally, Himachali cuisine is dominated by green meat and wheat bread.

Thick and rich gravy, with aromatic spices, is used in abundance(upper Shimla, Lahaul, Chamba) as the base of many dishes. Dham is the traditional food served in marriages or other functions. Siddu, Patrode, Cheele,Tudkiya Bhath and Babru are the authentic snack dishes of the state. Now, steamed momos (dumplings) and noodles are also readily available and popular with travellers who want to graduate to Indian food slowly. Some of the specialities of Himachal include Manee, Mandra or "Madra", "Palda", "Redu" Patrode, Chouck, Bhagjery and chutney of til (sesame seeds).
