= Temjentoshi Jamir =

Indian cricketer (born 1985)

Personal information
- Born: 12 February 1985 (age 41)
- Source: Cricinfo, 16 October 2019

Temjentoshi Jamir (born 12 February 1985) is an Indian cricketer. He made his List A debut on 14 October 2019, for Nagaland in the 2019–20 Vijay Hazare Trophy. He made his Twenty20 debut on 9 November 2019, for Nagaland in the 2019–20 Syed Mushtaq Ali Trophy. He made his first-class debut on 3 January 2020, for Nagaland in the 2019–20 Ranji Trophy.
