= Fazil Rashid =

Indian cricketer (born 1996)

Personal information
- Born: 11 December 1996 (age 29); Hyderpora, Srinagar, Jammu and Kashmir, India
- Batting: Right-handed
- Role: Wicket-keeper
- Source: ESPNcricinfo, 1 November 2018

Fazil Rashid (born 11 December 1996) is an Indian cricketer. He made his List A debut for Jammu & Kashmirin the 2017–18 Vijay Hazare Trophy on 11 February 2018. He made his first-class debut for Jammu & Kashmir in the 2018–19 Ranji Trophy on 1 November 2018. He made his Twenty20 debut on 11 November 2019, for Jammu & Kashmir in the 2019–20 Syed Mushtaq Ali Trophy.
