= Rati (given name) =

Rati is the goddess of passion and lust in Hinduism.

Rati is a given name that may refer to:

A masculine given name of Georgian origin (რატი):

- Rati Andronikashvili (born 2001), Georgian basketball player
- Rati Samkurashvili (born 1977), Georgian politician
- Rati Aleksidze (born 1978), Georgian footballer
- Rati Amaglobeli (born 1977), Georgian poet and translator
- Rati Tsinamdzgvrishvili (born 1988), Georgian footballer
- Rati Urushadze (born 1975), Georgian rugby player

A feminine given name of Indian origin:

- Rati Agnihotri (born 1960), Indian actress
- Rati Pandey, Indian television actress
- Rathi Arumugam, (born 1982), Indian film actress
- Rati Ram, economics professor at Illinois State University, USA

== See also ==
- Ratty (disambiguation)
- Raty, a surname
