= Arjun Naidu =

Indian cricketer (1924–2000)

Personal information
- Full name: Arjun Ramchander Naidu
- Born: 3 July 1924; Rajkot, India
- Died: 14 November 2000 (aged 76); Udaipur, India
- Batting: Right-handed
- Bowling: Left-arm fast-medium
- Source: ESPNcricinfo, 29 November 2016

Arjun Naidu (3 July 1924 – 14 November 2000) was an Indian first-class cricketer who represented Rajasthan. He made his first-class debut for Rajasthan (then Rajputana) in the 1945-46 Ranji Trophy on 2 February 1946.

== Cricket career ==
Naidu played for several teams in the Ranji Trophy between 1946 and 1962: Rajputana, Holkar, Madhya Pradesh and Rajasthan. He was a left-arm fast-medium bowler and occasionally an opening batsman. He represented India in one match against the Commonwealth XI in 1953–54.

== Coaching ==
Naidu later became the director of cricket operations in the state of Rajasthan. Under his guidance the team did fairly well, eventually with the patronage of Maharana Bhagwat Singhji and later sports board of Rajasthan, and National Institute of Sports. In those times the Rajasthan team reached the Ranji Trophy Finals nine times in the 1960s and 1970s.

== Career highlights, Ranji Trophy finals ==
1. http://static.espncricinfo.com/db/ARCHIVE/1950S/1952-53/IND_LOCAL/RANJI/HOLKAR_BENG_RJI-FINAL_20-24MAR1953.html
2. http://static.espncricinfo.com/db/ARCHIVE/1950S/1951-52/IND_LOCAL/RANJI/BOM_HOLKAR_RJI-FINAL_01-05MAR1952.html
