= Rohan Rathi =

Indian cricketer (born 1995)

Personal information
- Born: 21 September 1995 (age 31)
- Source: Cricinfo, 12 November 2019

Rohan Rathi (born 21 September 1995) is an Indian cricketer. He made his Twenty20 debut on 12 November 2019, for Delhi in the 2019–20 Syed Mushtaq Ali Trophy.
