= Navarangpura =

Navarangpura નવરંગપુરા
- Neighbourhood
- Location in Ahmedabad, Gujarat, India Navarangpura (Gujarat) Navarangpura (India)
- Coordinates: 23.035506°N 72.564675°E
- Country: India
- State: Gujarat
- Metro: Ahmedabad

Government
  - Body: Ahmedabad Municipal Corporation

Languages
  - Official: Gujarati, Hindi, English
- Time zone: UTC+5:30 (IST)
- PIN: 380009
- Civic agency: Ahmedabad Municipal Corporation
- Website: gujaratindia.com

Navarangpura, also spelled Navrangpura, is an area in the city of Ahmedabad in Gujarat, India. The neighborhood was one of the first to be developed outside of the Old City. Navrangpura, along with residential societies, houses many cafes and restaurants which are popular among college students.

In April 2025, the demolition work of the Navrangpura Bus Stand, which was built in 1963 by architect Charles Correa, started as the building outlived its age. Navarangpura post office is another public building serving the locality. In June 2025, the Standing Committee of Amdavad Municipal Corporation (AMC) revealed plans for a 10-storey Urban House in the Navrangpura ward at a cost of Rs.96 crore. Tim Hortons, the Canadian coffee chain, also started an outlet at Navrangpura,

== Educational and research institutions ==
The following well known educational and research institutions are located in Navarangpura:

- Ahmedabad Textile Industry's Research Association
- Center for Environmental Planning and Technology
- Gujarat University
- L.D. College of Engineering
- Mount Carmel High School, Ahmedabad
- Physical Research Laboratory
- Vikram Sarabhai Community Science Centre

== Sports ==
Sardar Vallabhbhai Patel Stadium, Ahmedabad is located in Navarangpura.
