= Otto Räty =

Finnish ice hockey player

- Born: January 2, 1992 (age 33); Tampere, Finland
- Height: 6 ft 0 in (183 cm)
- Weight: 161 lb (73 kg; 11 st 7 lb)
- Position: Defence
- Shoots: Right
- SM-liiga team Former teams: Lukko; Tappara
- Playing career: 2011–present

Otto Räty (born January 2, 1992) is a Finnish ice hockey defenceman. His is currently playing with Lukko in the Finnish SM-liiga.

Räty made his SM-liiga debut playing with Tappara during the 2011–12 SM-liiga season.
