= Shubham Rathi =

Indian social activist

Shubham rathi
- Born: 10 April 1992 (age 34); Moradabad, Uttar Pradesh, India
- Education: Hindu College, Delhi
- Organization: Jat Mahasabha uttar pradesh student union
- Movement: 2020–2021 Indian farmers' protest

Shubham Rathi (born 10 April 1992) is an Indian social activist, promoting issues raised by Farmers, Students and labourers facing injustice in India. He is the state president of Uttar Pradesh student union in Uttar Pradesh and youth president of Jat Mahasabha in Uttar Pradesh. He is an alumnus of Hindu College, Delhi.

== Early life ==
Shubham Rathi was born in Jahangipur village in moradabad district, Uttar Pradesh on 10 April 1992. He is the son of a Kulveer Singh Rathi. Rathi graduated with a degree from Hindu College, Delhi.

== Activism ==
Rathi On 8 August 2020 appointed as president of youth students Wing of All India Jat Mahasabha and on 19 November 2021 appointed as state president of youth students wing of all india jat mahaSabha.Uttar pradesh student union founded in year 2018. Uttar Pradesh Students Union Under Shubham Rathi To Protest Across uttar pradesh Against Agnipath Scheme. Director Ekta Kapoor lodged FIR on the web series.

== See also ==
- List of peace activists
