= Ankit Yadav =

Indian cricketer (born 1993)

Personal information
- Full name: Ankit Nandakishore Yadav
- Born: 19 November 1993 (age 32); Jharsuguda, Odisha, India
- Batting: Right-handed
- Bowling: Right arm medium

Domestic team information
- Years: Team
- 2012–13: Odisha
- Source: ESPNcricinfo, 21 September 2018

Ankit Yadav (born 19 November 1993) is an Indian cricketer. He made his List A debut for Odisha in the 2012–13 Vijay Hazare Trophy on 18 February 2013. He made his first-class debut on 12 February 2020, for Odisha in the 2019–20 Ranji Trophy.
