= Jasu Patel =

Indian cricketer (1924–1992)

Personal information
- Full name: Jasubhai Motibhai Patel
- Born: 26 November 1924; Ahmedabad, British India
- Died: 12 December 1992 (aged 68); Ahmedabad, Gujarat, India
- Batting: Right-handed
- Bowling: Right-arm off-break

International information
- National side: India
- Test debut (cap 74): 26 February 1955 v Pakistan
- Last Test: 23 January 1960 v Australia

Career statistics
Competition	Test	First-class
Matches	7	68
Runs scored	25	780
Batting average	2.77	12.78
100s/50s	0/0	1/3
Top score	12	152
Balls bowled	1,725	5,382
Wickets	29	248
Bowling average	21.96	21.70
5 wickets in innings	2	19
10 wickets in match	1	5
Best bowling	9/69	9/69
Catches/stumpings	2	26
- Source: CricketArchive, 3 September 2022

Jasubhai Motibhai Patel (26 November 1924 – 12 December 1992) was an off-spinner who played Test cricket for India.

== Early days ==
At the age of ten, Patel broke his arm falling from a tree. Because of this injury he had a jerky bowling action, which some considered suspicious. He bowled off-cutters more than conventional off breaks. He was particularly dangerous on matting wickets where he got prodigious turn.

He began his first-class career in 1943–44, and played occasionally for Gujarat before establishing his place in the 1950–51 season, when he took 5 for 43 and 6 for 61 against Baroda, and 8 for 53 and 5 for 28 against Services. His batting was usually negligible, but in the Ranji Trophy final in 1950–51 against Holkar, he scored 152 batting at No.10 in the fourth innings. Patel came in at 167 for 8 and scored his runs out of the last 191 runs in two hours, adding 136 in 90 minutes for the tenth wicket with Hasan Nakhuda. It is still the second highest score by a No.10 batter in first class cricket. It was his only century.

He played once for India against the Commonwealth XI in 1953-54, and toured Pakistan the following season, taking 35 wickets at an average of 10.71, including 4 for 22 and 8 for 25 against Pakistan Universities. He made his Test debut in the Fifth Test, taking three wickets. He played another Test against New Zealand in 1955–56, then two against Australia in 1956–57. These four Tests yielded 10 wickets at 31.00.

He was 35 and on the verge of retirement when he enjoyed his one great success against Australia at Kanpur in 1959–60.

Australia came to India on the back of convincing wins over England and Pakistan. For India, the loss in the first Test of the series was their fifth innings defeat of the year. Kanpur had a newly laid pitch. Patel was picked as a gamble, on the insistence of the chairman of selectors, Lala Amarnath.

== "Patel's Test" ==
India was out for 152 before close on the first day. Patel got his first wicket on the second morning when he caught Gavin Stevens left-handed off an attempted big hit. At lunch, Australia were well on top at 128 for 1. Till that point of time, Patel had bowled from the city end, where he had not been able to exploit the footmarks created by the left arm bowlers Alan Davidson and Ian Meckiff. Amarnath presumably had a word with the captain, Ramchand, during lunch. Patel switched to the pavilion end after the break.

Patel's first ball after lunch went between the bat and pad to bowl Colin McDonald. Norman O'Neill who replaced him was all at sea and offered an easy chance to Bapu Nadkarni at midwicket, who missed it. This was to deprive Patel of a chance to take all ten wickets. Neil Harvey completed fifty before he was bowled. Patel pitched one well outside left-handed Harvey's off-stump. Harvey raised the bat and left it but the ball cut back and hit the stumps.

Once Harvey was out, the others followed quickly. Davidson hit out at the end to take the score to 219. O'Neill, bowled by a full-toss from Chandu Borde, was the only wicket that Patel missed. His figures were 9 for 69.

India batted much better in the second innings to set Australia 225 to win in 400 minutes. Patel dismissed Stevens, and Polly Umrigar took the important wicket of Harvey before the close of the fourth day. Umrigar took two more wickets on the final morning to reduce Australia to 61 for 4. Patel took four of the remaining five wickets, Gordon Rorke being unable to bat. Australia was all out for 105 and India won by 119 runs. It was India's first win over Australia.

Patel's 14 for 124 remained the best Test bowling figures by an Indian bowler for nearly thirty years until they were bettered by Narendra Hirwani. Patel's 9 for 69 stood as the best bowling in a Test innings by an Indian bowler till Anil Kumble took 10 for 74 forty years later.

== Remaining career ==
The Kanpur Test stayed as the lone bright spot in Patel's Test career. He played two more Tests in the series for five wickets. They were his last Test matches. Within a few weeks of the Kanpur Test, he was awarded Padma Shri as part of the 1960 Republic Day honours list. Patel and Vijay Hazare were the first cricketers to be so honoured.

Patel played two more years of first-class cricket and ended up with 140 wickets for Gujarat in the Ranji Trophy. He died on 12 December 1992, aged 68.
