= Rathee (surname) =

Rathee is a surname. Notable people with the surname include:

- Ankur Rathee (born 1991), Indian-born American actor, brother of Sonia Rathee.
- Dhruv Rathee (born 1994), Indian YouTuber and social media activist.
- Mohit Rathee (born 1999), Indian cricketer.
- Sonia Rathee (born 1996, Indian-born American actor, sister of Ankur Rathee
- Nafe Singh Rathee (1954–2024), politician from Haryana.

== See also ==
- Rathi (disambiguation), for similar or related surnames and topics
