= CB Patel International Cricket Stadium =

Cricket stadium in Surat, Gujarat, India

C B Patel International Cricket Stadium
- Interactive map of C B Patel International Cricket Stadium

Ground information
- Location: Surat, Gujarat, India
- Coordinates: 21°9′8.5″N 72°47′17.6″E
- Establishment: 2011; 15 years ago
- Capacity: 35,000
- Owner: Veer Narmad South Gujarat University C B Patel Group
- Operator: Surat Cricket Association
- Tenants: Gujarat cricket team

International information

C B Patel International Cricket Stadium is cricket stadium in Surat, Gujarat, India. The stadium is named as CB Patel.

The ground is constructed by Bharthana's leading farmer Raju G Patel & C B Patel Group in the year and half period on the 3.75 sq. ft land of Veer Narmad South Gujarat University in Surat. The ground is developed with 2 lakh sq. ft according to the standards of international stadium. The stadium can accommodate 35,000 people.

Then Gujarat Chief Minister and Gujarat Cricket Association head Narendra Modi laid the foundation of the stadium in November 2009. The ground received a donation from a cricket lover Kamlesh Pat TTel. He donated Rs. 5 crore.

In February 2011, Narendra Modi inaugurated the stadium after that Chief Minister of Gujarat and chief of Gujarat Cricket Association inaugurated the stadium.

== See also ==
- List of tourist attractions in Surat
