= Rati Samkurashvili =

Georgian politician

Rati Samkurashvili (Georgian: რატი სამყურაშვილი; born December 19, 1977, Chiatura, Georgian SSR, USSR) is a Georgian politician, member of the United National Movement, the member of Parliament of Georgia's VI and VII convocation. In 1998 he graduated from Tbilisi State University faculty of history with bachelor's degree, in 2000 from the same faculty with master's degree. In 2000-2003 he was Tbilisi State University's Political Science department's postgraduate student, and between the years 2012-2014 studied at the Council of Europe's School of Political Studies. In 2001 he became the member of political organization - the United National Movement, and during 2001-2003 he held the position of regional deputy chairman of this political party. In 2004-2008 he was the member of Parliament of Georgia's VI convocation and National Movement parliamentary fraction's deputy chairman. In 2008-2012 he was the member of Parliament's VII convocation. He is also the delegation member of Parliamentary Assembly of the Council of Europe.
