= Ali Hussain (cricketer) =

Pakistani cricketer (born 1979)

Personal information
- Born: 30 March 1979 (age 47); Lahore, Pakistan
- Source: Cricinfo, 18 March 2021

Ali Hussain (born 30 March 1979) is a Pakistani cricketer. He played in 38 first-class and 12 List A matches between 1998 and 2009.
