= Prabin Luha =

Indian cricketer (born 1995)

Personal information
- Born: 11 May 1995 (age 31); Bargarh, Odisha, India
- Source: Cricinfo, 11 November 2019

Prabin Luha (born 11 May 1995) is an Indian cricketer. He made his Twenty20 debut on 11 November 2019, for Odisha in the 2019–20 Syed Mushtaq Ali Trophy. He made his List A debut on 26 February 2021, for Odisha in the 2020–21 Vijay Hazare Trophy.
