= Lalit Yadav (Delhi cricketer) =

Indian cricketer (born 1997)

Personal information
- Born: 3 January 1997 (age 29); Delhi, India
- Height: 6 ft 2 in (188 cm)
- Batting: Right-handed
- Bowling: Right-arm offbreak
- Role: All-rounder

Domestic team information
- Years: Team
- 2017–present: Delhi
- 2021–2024: Delhi Capitals
- Source: ESPNcricinfo, 3 February 2019

Lalit Yadav (born 3 January 1997) is an Indian cricketer. He made his first-class debut for Delhi in the 2017–18 Ranji Trophy on 17 November 2017. He made his Twenty20 debut for Delhi in the 2017–18 Zonal T20 League on 9 January 2018. He made his List A debut for Delhi in the 2017–18 Vijay Hazare Trophy on 15 February 2018.

In the 2020 IPL auction, he was bought by the Delhi Capitals ahead of the 2020 Indian Premier League. In February 2022, he was again bought by the Delhi Capitals in the auction for the 2022 Indian Premier League tournament. Later the same month, in the 2021–22 Ranji Trophy, Yadav scored his maiden century in first-class cricket, with 177 runs against Tamil Nadu.
