= Lalabhai Contractor Stadium =

Cricket stadium

Lalbhai Contractor Stadium
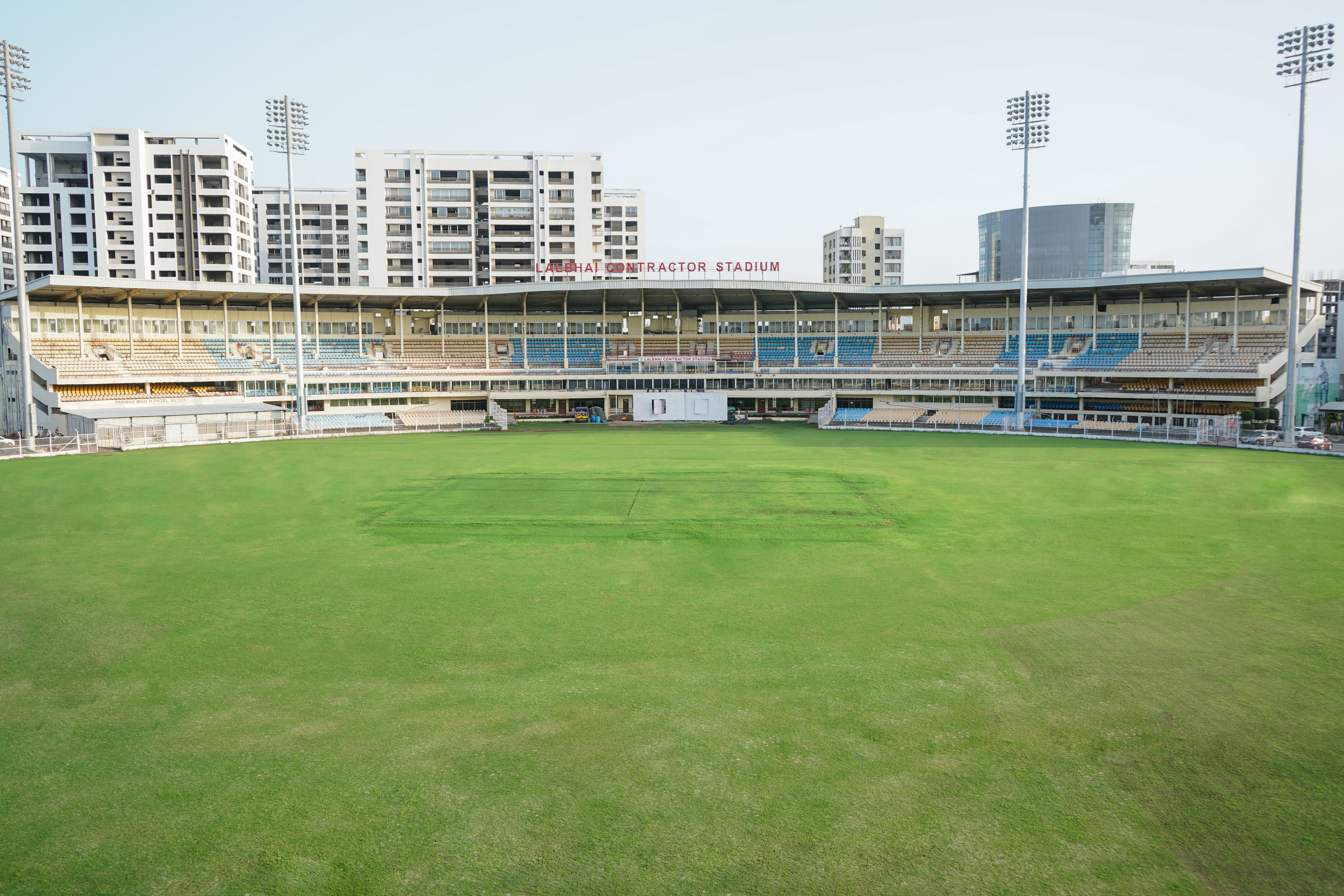
- Interactive map of Lalbhai Contractor Stadium

Ground information
- Location: Vesu, Surat, Gujarat
- Country: India
- Coordinates: 21°9′19.4″N 72°46′9″E
- Establishment: ~1993
- Capacity: 7,000
- Owner: Surat District Cricket Association
- Operator: Gujarat Cricket Association
- Tenants: Gujarat cricket team
- End names
- North End; South End

International information
- First women's T20I: 24 September 2019: India v South Africa
- Last women's T20I: 4 October 2019: India v South Africa
- As of 2019; Source: Lalbhai Contractor Stadium, ESPNcricinfo

Lalbhai Contractor Stadium is a cricket stadium in Surat, Gujarat, India. The stadium is owned by the Surat District Cricket Association (SDCA). The first match played at the stadium was a Duleep Trophy match between West Zone and East Zone in 1993. The stadium hosted 15 cricket matches over the following 20 years, including Ranji Trophy, Irani Cup and Duleep Trophy matches. The ground hosted international cricket for the first time during South Africa Women's 2019 tour of India. All five WT20Is of the tour were played at the Lalbhai Contractor Stadium.

This stadium was made possible only because of donation of 86,730 Sq. yards of land donated in 1986/87 by Shri Hemant Lalbhai Contractor and their sister Jyoti Contractor in memory of their father Late Shri Lalbhai Ramjibhai Contractor who was himself enthusiast of game of cricket and founder member of Bombay Cricket Association.

In 2009, SDCA revamped the Lalbhai Contractor Stadium. The SDCA has earmarked Rs 12 crore for the renovation of the stadium which has hosted several Ranji, Irani and Duleep Trophy matches.

For 15th Edition of Indian Premier League, 4-time champion Chennai Super Kings picked Lalbhai Contractor Stadium for their Preparation.

== Future plans ==
SDCA is actively pursuing plans to enhance its seating capacity from existing 7,000 spectators to 30,000 spectators and thereby becoming an arena for hosting National and International level cricket matches and tournaments. A modern Club House with residential accommodation, specialty restaurants, banquet hall, conference hall, a mini theatre and also locker facilities for the members, is also on the agenda of the association.
