= Gujarat cricket team =

Indian cricket team

Personnel
- Captain: Chintan Gaja
- Coach: Ramesh Powar
- Owner: Gujarat Cricket Association

Team information
- Founded: 1935
- Home ground: Narendra Modi Stadium
- Capacity: 132,000

History
- First-class debut: Bombay in 1935 at Gujarat College Ground, Ahmedabad
- Ranji Trophy wins: 1
- Irani Cup wins: 0
- Vijay Hazare Trophy wins: 1
- Syed Mushtaq Ali Trophy wins: 2
- Official website: GCA

The Gujarat cricket team is one of the three first-class cricket teams based in the Indian state of Gujarat (the other two being the Baroda cricket team and the Saurashtra cricket team).

Led by Parthiv Patel, Gujarat won their maiden Ranji Trophy title in the 2016–17 season, beating Mumbai in the final at Indore. In that match they made the highest successful run-chase in the final of the Ranji Trophy.

It is in the Elite Group of the Ranji Trophy although it has had very little success. There have, however, been many cricketers that have passed through its ranks and gone on to play for the Indian cricket team. It falls under the West Zone in the Duleep Trophy.

== History ==
Gujarat's first appearance in a Ranji Trophy final came in the season of 1950–51, where it was facing Holkar in the Ranji Trophy Final. Holkar won the high-scoring match by 189 runs, the match featured a double century by Holkar's Chandu Sarwate and a fighting 152 by Gujarati off-spinner Jasu Patel (who averaged 21.70 in 87 innings).

In 2007–08, Gujarat won their maiden Ranji Trophy Plate League title by defeating Railways. Gujarat were in a lose-win situation and six and four and out they lost.

In the year 2010/11, Gujarat made a wonderful start to the Ranji Season. They went for a draw against Bengal and later on made an outright win against a strong Delhi Team but lost two consecutive matches against Madhya Pradesh and Baroda which ended their hope of entering Quarter Final Stage.

They drew a high scoring match against Tamil Nadu, which featured the comeback of Parthiv Patel (as he was busy in national duty) but lost the match against Haryana which forced them to go back at the Plate League.

Gujarat won the Syed Mushtaq Ali trophy in 2012–13 defeating Punjab in the final by four wickets with 13 deliveries to spare.

Gujarat's best appearance in a Ranji Trophy final came in the season of 2016–17, where it was facing Mumbai in the Ranji Trophy final in Indore. Parthiv Patel scored a precious century (143, 196b, 24 x 4s) and scripted a most memorable maiden Ranji Trophy victory at the Holkar Stadium. No team had chased a target over 310 in the Ranji Trophy and when Gujarat began the fifth and final day. Priyank Panchal from Gujarat made 1310 runs in the 2016-17 Ranji Trophy season at an average of 87.33 from 17 innings, which is the most by any batsman this season and the third most by any batsman in a single Ranji Trophy season. Gujarat's Samit Gohel made 359* runs against Orissa in Jaipur in this Ranji Trophy season, which became the joint fourth most by a player in a Ranji Trophy match. His score of 359* in that match is now the highest by an opener carrying the bat in a First Class match. He faced 723 balls in that innings and it is now the sixth-longest innings in terms of balls faced in a First Class match.

== Honours ==
- Ranji Trophy
  - Winners: 2016–17
  - Runners-up: 1950–51
- Vijay Hazare Trophy
  - Winners: 2015–16
  - Runners-up: 2010–11
- Syed Mushtaq Ali Trophy
  - Winners (2): 2012–13, 2014–15

== Home grounds ==
- Narendra Modi Stadium, Ahmedabad
- Lalabhai Contractor Stadium, Surat
- Sardar Vallabhbhai Patel Stadium, Valsad

== Notable players ==
- Vinoo Mankad
- Nari Contractor
- Axar Patel
- Parthiv Patel
- Manpreet Juneja
- Jasu Patel
- Deepak Shodhan
- Jasprit Bumrah
- Piyush Chawla

== Current squad ==
Players with international caps are listed in bold.

Name	Birth date	Batting style	Bowling style	Notes
Batsmen
Aarya Desai	3 April 2003 (age 23)	Left-handed	Right-arm off break	
Jaymeet Patel	17 May 2002 (age 24)	Left-handed	Left-arm medium	
Abhishek Desai	10 December 1998 (age 27)	Left-handed		
Saurav Chauhan	27 May 2000 (age 26)	Left-handed	Right-arm off break	
Manan Hingrajia	17 February 1998 (age 28)	Left-handed	Right-arm off break	
Kshitij Patel	15 October 1997 (age 29)	Right-handed	Right-arm off break	
Ahaan Poddar	5 October 2002 (age 24)	Right-handed	Right-arm leg break	
Ashutosh Sharma	15 September 1998 (age 28)	Right-handed		Plays for **Delhi Capitals** in IPL
Vedant Trivedi	21 April 2007 (age 19)	Right-handed	Right-arm leg break	
Smit Patel	20 April 2000 (age 26)	Right-handed	Right-arm off break	
Khilan Patel	26 November 2006 (age 19)	Left-handed	Slow left-arm orthodox	
All-rounders
Hemang Patel	20 November 1998 (age 27)	Right-handed	Right-arm medium	
**Axar Patel**	20 January 1994 (age 32)	Left-handed	Slow left-arm orthodox	Plays for **Delhi Capitals** in IPL
Wicket-keeper
Urvil Patel	17 October 1998 (age 28)	Right-handed		**Vice-captain**; Plays for **Chennai Super Kings** in IPL
Spinners
Vishal Jayswal	2 April 1998 (age 28)	Left-handed	Slow left-arm orthodox	
**Ravi Bishnoi**	5 September 2000 (age 26)	Right-handed	Right-arm leg break	Plays for **Rajasthan Royals** in IPL
Siddharth Desai	16 August 2000 (age 26)	Left-handed	Slow left-arm orthodox	
Amit Desai	4 May 2002 (age 24)	Right-handed	Right-arm off break	
Pacers
Arzan Nagwaswalla	17 October 1997 (age 29)	Right-handed	Left-arm medium	`
Chintan Gaja	13 November 1994 (age 32)	Right-handed	Right-arm medium-fast	**Captain**
Japagnya Bhatt	27 September 2001 (age 25)	Left-handed	Left-arm medium	
**Harshal Patel**	23 November 1990 (age 35)	Right-handed	Right-arm medium	Plays for **Gujarat Titans** in IPL
**Jasprit Bumrah**	6 December 1993 (age 32)	Right-handed	Right-arm fast-medium	Plays for **Mumbai Indians** in IPL

Updated as on 17 November 2026
