= 2019–20 Syed Mushtaq Ali Trophy =

Indian cricket tournament

- Dates: 8 November – 1 December 2019
- Administrator(s): BCCI
- Cricket format: T20
- Tournament format(s): Round robin, then knockout
- Champions: Karnataka (2nd title)
- Participants: 38
- Matches: 149
- Most runs: Devdutt Padikkal (580) (Karnataka)
- Most wickets: Ravisrinivasan Sai Kishore (20) (Tamil Nadu)
- Official website: http://www.bcci.tv

The 2019–20 Syed Mushtaq Ali Trophy was the twelfth edition of the Syed Mushtaq Ali Trophy, an annual Twenty20 tournament in India. Played from 8 November to 1 December 2019, it was contested by all 38 Ranji Trophy teams and won by Karnataka, the defending champions, for their second title. Chandigarh, the last of the expansion teams introduced in 2018–19, made their debut.

The tournament retained the same format as the previous edition of the competition and had five groups, with two groups containing seven teams and three groups with eight teams. The top two teams in each group qualified for the Super League section of the tournament, with the teams then split into two further groups of five teams each. The top two teams of each of the Super League groups progressed to the semi-finals.

On the opening day of the tournament, Karnataka beat Uttarakhand by nine wickets, setting a new record for the most consecutive wins in T20 matches in India, with fifteen. Six rain-affected matches from the first day of the tournament were rescheduled to take place on 18 November 2019.

Following the conclusion of matches played on 17 November 2019, Baroda and Karnataka from Group A, Tamil Nadu and Rajasthan from Group B, and Mumbai and Haryana from Group D had all progressed to the Super League stage of the tournament. After the final day of group stage matches, Maharashtra and Punjab from Group C, and Delhi and Jharkhand from Group E had also progressed to the Super League.

From the Super League, Haryana, Karnataka, Rajasthan and Tamil Nadu advanced to the semi-finals. In the first semi-final, between Haryana and Karnataka, Abhimanyu Mithun took five wickets in one over for Karnataka, including a hat-trick. Karnataka won the match by eight wickets to advance to the final. In the second semi-final, Tamil Nadu beat Rajasthan by seven wickets to progress. In the final, Karnataka beat Tamil Nadu by one run to defend their title.

== League stage ==
=== Group A ===
Team	Pld	W	L	T	NR	Pts	NRR
Baroda	6	5	1	0	0	20	+1.351
Karnataka	6	5	1	0	0	20	+2.052
Services	6	4	2	0	0	16	+0.234
Andhra	6	3	3	0	0	12	+0.797
Uttarakhand	6	2	4	0	0	8	−0.448
Goa	6	2	4	0	0	8	−0.917
Bihar	6	0	6	0	0	0	−2.972

- Top two teams advanced to the Super League

=== Group B ===
Team	Pld	W	L	T	NR	Pts	NRR
Tamil Nadu	6	5	1	0	0	20	+3.195
Rajasthan	6	4	2	0	0	16	+1.938
Vidarbha	6	4	2	0	0	16	+0.566
Kerala	6	4	2	0	0	16	+0.503
Uttar Pradesh	6	3	3	0	0	12	−0.509
Tripura	6	1	5	0	0	4	−1.983
Manipur	6	0	6	0	0	0	−3.929

- Top two teams advanced to the Super League

=== Group C ===
Team	Pld	W	L	T	NR	Pts	NRR
Maharashtra	7	5	2	0	0	20	+0.510
Punjab	7	4	3	0	0	16	+1.026
Chandigarh	7	4	3	0	0	16	+0.701
Chhattisgarh	7	4	3	0	0	16	+0.686
Hyderabad	7	4	3	0	0	16	–0.255
Railways	7	4	3	0	0	16	–0.872
Himachal Pradesh	7	3	4	0	0	12	+0.564
Arunachal Pradesh	7	0	7	0	0	0	–2.685

- Top two teams advanced to the Super League

=== Group D ===
Team	Pld	W	L	T	NR	Pts	NRR
Mumbai	7	6	1	0	0	24	+2.126
Haryana	7	6	1	0	0	24	+1.744
Bengal	7	4	3	0	0	16	+1.289
Madhya Pradesh	7	4	3	0	0	16	+0.780
Pondicherry	7	4	3	0	0	16	+0.050
Meghalaya	7	3	4	0	0	12	−1.520
Assam	7	1	6	0	0	4	−0.490
Mizoram	7	0	7	0	0	0	−4.283

- Top two teams advanced to the Super League

=== Group E ===
Team	Pld	W	L	T	NR	Pts	NRR
Delhi	7	5	1	0	1	22	+1.331
Jharkhand	7	5	1	0	1	22	+0.982
Gujarat	7	4	2	0	1	18	+1.974
Jammu & Kashmir	7	4	2	0	1	18	+0.449
Odisha	7	3	3	0	1	14	+0.576
Saurashtra	7	3	4	0	0	12	+0.559
Nagaland	7	1	6	0	0	4	−2.437
Sikkim	7	0	6	0	1	2	−3.002

- Top two teams advanced to the Super League,

== Super League ==
=== Points table ===
Group A

Team	P	W	L	T	NR	Pts	NRR
Haryana	4	3	1	0	0	12	+1.124
Rajasthan	4	2	2	0	0	8	–0.254
Maharashtra	4	2	2	0	0	8	–0.444
Baroda	4	2	2	0	0	8	–0.908
Delhi	4	1	3	0	0	4	+0.550

- Top two teams from the group advances to the Semi-finals.

Group B

Team	P	W	L	T	NR	Pts	NRR
Tamil Nadu	4	3	1	0	0	12	+0.869
Karnataka	4	3	1	0	0	12	+0.762
Mumbai	4	3	1	0	0	8	–0.194
Punjab	4	1	3	0	0	4	+0.746
Jharkhand	4	0	4	0	0	0	–2.323

- Top two teams from the group advance to the Semi-finals.

=== Group A ===
21 November 2019
Scorecard

Delhi; 167/5 (20 overs)	v	Maharashtra; 90 (17.2 overs)
Dhruv Shorey 48* (37); Shamshuzama Kazi 2/20 (3 overs)		Ruturaj Gaikwad 42 (32); Nitish Rana 4/17 (3.2 overs)

Delhi won by 77 runs
CB Patel International Cricket Stadium, Surat
Umpires: K. N. Ananthapadmanabhan and Sundaram Ravi

- Maharashtra won the toss and elected to field.

21 November 2019
Scorecard

Baroda; 201/5 (20 overs)	v	Rajasthan; 186/8 (20 overs)
Aditya Waghmode 88 (50); Aniket Choudhary 2/27 (4 overs)		Ankit Lamba 54 (37); Atit Sheth 3/34 (4 overs)

Baroda won by 15 runs
Lalabhai Contractor Stadium, Surat
Umpires: Ulhas Gandhe and Rohan Pandit

- Baroda won the toss and elected to bat.

22 November 2019
Scorecard

Rajasthan; 123/7 (20 overs)	v	Haryana; 124/6 (15.2 overs)
Ankit Lamba 38 (41); Rahul Tewatia 3/18 (4 overs)		Harshal Patel 41 (25); Chandrapal Singh 2/16 (4 overs)

Haryana won by 4 wickets
CB Patel International Cricket Stadium, Surat
Umpires: K. N. Ananthapadmanabhan and Virender Sharma

- Rajasthan won the toss and elected to bat.

22 November 2019
Scorecard

Baroda; 151/6 (20 overs)	v	Delhi; 150/9 (20 overs)
Aditya Waghmode 36 (31); Nitish Rana 2/22 (4 overs)		Kunwar Bidhuri 68 (51); Babashafi Pathan 3/24 (4 overs)

Baroda won by 1 run
Lalabhai Contractor Stadium, Surat
Umpires: Ulhas Gandhe and Sundaram Ravi

- Delhi won the toss and elected to field.
- Kunwar Bidhuri (Delhi) made his T20 debut.

24 November 2019
Scorecard

Maharashtra; 165/2 (20 overs)	v	Baroda; 98 (17.3 overs)
Azim Kazi 48* (33); Swapnil Singh 1/19 (4 overs)		Kedar Devdhar 27 (20); Samad Fallah 2/12 (2.3 overs)

Maharashtra won by 67 runs
CB Patel International Cricket Stadium, Surat
Umpires: Ulhas Gandhe and Rohan Pandit

- Maharashtra won the toss and elected to bat.

24 November 2019
Scorecard

Haryana; 181/6 (20 overs)	v	Delhi; 151/8 (20 overs)
Himanshu Rana 59 (40); Simarjeet Singh 2/43 (4 overs)		Nitish Rana 37 (25); Yuzvendra Chahal 3/27 (3 overs)

Haryana won by 30 runs
Lalabhai Contractor Stadium, Surat
Umpires: Sundaram Ravi and Virender Sharma

- Delhi won the toss and elected to field.

25 November 2019
Scorecard

Baroda; 138/5 (20 overs)	v	Haryana; 139/4 (17.3 overs)
Yusuf Pathan 45* (34); Jayant Yadav 1/7 (2 overs)		Shivam Chauhan 50* (37); Yusuf Pathan 2/11 (2.3 overs)

Haryana won by 6 wickets
CB Patel International Cricket Stadium, Surat
Umpires: Virender Sharma and Sundaram Ravi

- Haryana won the toss and elected to field.
- Jitesh Saroha (Haryana) made his T20 debut.

25 November 2019
Scorecard

Maharashtra; 99/9 (20 overs)	v	Rajasthan; 101/4 (16.2 overs)
Nikhil Naik 23 (27); Rahul Chahar 3/5 (4 overs)		Mahipal Lomror 35* (34); Naushad Shaikh 1/8 (2 overs)

Rajasthan won by 6 wickets
Lalabhai Contractor Stadium, Surat
Umpires: K. N. Ananthapadmanabhan and Rohan Pandit

- Rajasthan won the toss and elected to field.

27 November 2019
Scorecard

Rajasthan; 133/7 (20 overs)	v	Delhi; 131/9 (20 overs)
Deepak Chahar 55* (42); Suboth Bhati 2/20 (4 overs)		Lalit Yadav 30 (24); Arjit Gupta 3/12 (4 overs)

Rajasthan won by 2 runs
CB Patel International Cricket Stadium, Surat
Umpires: Ulhas Gandhe and Rohan Pandit

- Rajasthan won the toss and elected to bat.

27 November 2019
Scorecard

Maharashtra; 167/5 (20 overs)	v	Haryana; 165/7 (20 overs)
Rahul Tripathi 61 (37); Sumit Kumar 3/32 (4 overs)		Shivam Chauhan 33 (35); Azim Kazi 2/41 (4 overs)

Maharashtra won by 2 runs
Lalabhai Contractor Stadium, Surat
Umpires: Sundaram Ravi and Virender Sharma

- Maharashtra won the toss and elected to bat.

=== Group B ===
21 November 2019
Scorecard

Punjab; 199/4 (20 overs)	v	Jharkhand; 90 (14.2 overs)
Mandeep Singh 81* (52); Shahbaz Nadeem 2/27 (4 overs)		Utkarsh Singh 24 (13); Harpreet Brar 2/20 (3.2 overs)

Punjab won by 109 runs
CB Patel International Cricket Stadium, Surat
Umpires: K. N. Ananthapadmanabhan and Sundaram Ravi

- Jharkhand won the toss and elected to field.

21 November 2019
Scorecard

Tamil Nadu; 158/7 (20 overs)	v	Karnataka; 161/1 (16.2 overs)
Dinesh Karthik 43 (29); Vasuki Koushik 2/23 (4 overs)		KL Rahul 69* (46); Murugan Ashwin 1/27 (4 overs)

Karnataka won by 9 wickets
Lalabhai Contractor Stadium, Surat
Umpires: Ulhas Gandhe and Rohan Pandit

- Karnataka won the toss and elected to field.

22 November 2019
Scorecard

Mumbai; 121/9 (20 overs)	v	Tamil Nadu; 122/3 (13.5 overs)
Shams Mulani 73 (52); Manimaran Siddharth 4/16 (4 overs)		Chezhian Harinishanth 73* (44); Shams Mulani 3/26 (4 overs)

Tamil Nadu won by 7 wickets
CB Patel International Cricket Stadium, Surat
Umpires: K. N. Ananthapadmanabhan and Virender Sharma

- Tamil Nadu won the toss and elected to field.
- Manimaran Siddharth (Tamil Nadu) made his T20 debut.

22 November 2019
Scorecard

Karnataka; 189/6 (20 overs)	v	Jharkhand; 176/5 (20 overs)
Devdutt Padikkal 63 (30); Sonu Singh 3/28 (4 overs)		Virat Singh 76* (44); Pavan Deshpande 2/34 (3 overs)

Karnataka won by 13 runs
Lalabhai Contractor Stadium, Surat
Umpires: Ulhas Gandhe and Sundaram Ravi

- Jharkhand won the toss and elected to field.

24 November 2019
Scorecard

Punjab; 163/6 (20 overs)	v	Karnataka; 167/3 (18 overs)
Mandeep Singh 76 (50); Ronit More 4/27 (4 overs)		KL Rahul 84* (48); Mayank Markande 1/27 (4 overs)

Karnataka won by 7 wickets
CB Patel International Cricket Stadium, Surat
Umpires: Ulhas Gandhe and Rohan Pandit

- Karnataka won the toss and elected to field.

24 November 2019
Scorecard

Jharkhand; 170/5 (20 overs)	v	Mumbai; 171/5 (19.1 overs)
Kumar Deobrat 58 (30); Shubham Ranjane 2/17 (4 overs)		Prithvi Shaw 64 (39); Sonu Singh 2/34 (4 overs)

Mumbai won by 5 wickets
Lalabhai Contractor Stadium, Surat
Umpires: K. N. Ananthapadmanabhan and Sundaram Ravi

- Mumbai won the toss and elected to field.

25 November 2019
Scorecard

Karnataka; 171/6 (20 overs)	v	Mumbai; 174/3 (19 overs)
Rohan Kadam 71 (47); Shardul Thakur 2/29 (4 overs)		Suryakumar Yadav 94* (53); Shreyas Gopal 1/19 (3 overs)

Mumbai won by 7 wickets
CB Patel International Cricket Stadium, Surat
Umpires: Virender Sharma and Sundaram Ravi

- Mumbai won the toss and elected to field.

25 November 2019
Scorecard

Punjab; 94/8 (20 overs)	v	Tamil Nadu; 98/6 (19.3 overs)
Mayank Markande 33* (26); Manimaran Siddharth 3/9 (4 overs)		Washington Sundar 45* (44); Abhishek Sharma 2/10 (3 overs)

Tamil Nadu won by 4 wickets
Lalabhai Contractor Stadium, Surat
Umpires: K. N. Ananthapadmanabhan and Rohan Pandit

- Tamil Nadu won the toss and elected to field.

27 November 2019
Scorecard

Jharkhand; 85 (18.1 overs)	v	Tamil Nadu; 86/2 (13.5 overs)
Saurabh Tiwary 24 (27); Manimaran Siddharth 4/18 (4 overs)		Washington Sundar 38* (22); Utkarsh Singh 1/21 (4 overs)

Tamil Nadu won by 8 wickets
CB Patel International Cricket Stadium, Surat
Umpires: Ulhas Gandhe and Rohan Pandit

- Jharkhand won the toss and elected to bat.

27 November 2019
Scorecard

Mumbai; 243/3 (20 overs)	v	Punjab; 221/6 (20 overs)
Suryakumar Yadav 80 (35); Harpreet Brar 2/44 (4 overs)		Shubman Gill 78 (38); Tushar Deshpande 2/35 (4 overs)

Mumbai won by 22 runs
Lalabhai Contractor Stadium, Surat
Umpires: Virender Sharma and Sundaram Ravi

- Punjab won the toss and elected to field.

== Finals ==
1st Semi-final
29 November 2019
Scorecard

Haryana; 194/8 (20 overs)	v	Karnataka; 195/2 (15 overs)
Himanshu Rana 61 (34); Abhimanyu Mithun 5/39 (4 overs)		Devdutt Padikkal 87 (42); Harshal Patel 1/28 (3 overs)

Karnataka won by 8 wickets
Lalabhai Contractor Stadium, Surat
Umpires: K. N. Ananthapadmanabhan and Virender Sharma

- Karnataka won the toss and elected to field.

2nd Semi-final
29 November 2019
Scorecard

Rajasthan; 112/9 (20 overs)	v	Tamil Nadu; 116/3 (17.5 overs)
Rajesh Bishnoi 23 (22); Vijay Shankar 2/13 (4 overs)		Washington Sundar 54* (46); Deepak Chahar 1/11 (2 overs)

Tamil Nadu won by 7 wickets
Lalabhai Contractor Stadium, Surat
Umpires: Virender Sharma and Rohan Pandit

- Tamil Nadu won the toss and elected to field.

Final
1 December 2019
Scorecard

Karnataka; 180/5 (20 overs)	v	Tamil Nadu; 179/6 (20 overs)
Manish Pandey 60* (45); Murugan Ashwin 2/33 (3 overs)		Vijay Shankar 44 (27); Ronit More 2/32 (4 overs)

Karnataka won by 1 run
Lalabhai Contractor Stadium, Surat
Umpires: K. N. Ananthapadmanabhan and Rohan Pandit

- Tamil Nadu won the toss and elected to field.
