= List of 2016 Indian Premier League personnel changes =

This is a list of all personnel changes for the 2016 Indian Premier League.

== Draft ==
Following the two-year suspension of Chennai Super Kings and Rajasthan Royals, two new franchises Rising Pune Supergiants and Gujarat Lions were established. These two franchises were allowed to draft a maximum of five players each from the Chennai and Rajasthan teams. The draft took place on 15 December 2015 and the following players were bought:

No.	Player	Salary
Rising Pune Supergiants
1	Mahendra Singh Dhoni	₹125 million (US$1.3 million)
2	Ajinkya Rahane	₹80 million (US$830,000)
3	Ravichandran Ashwin	₹75 million (US$780,000)
4	Steve Smith	₹40 million (US$420,000)
5	Faf du Plessis	₹47.5 million (US$490,000)
Gujarat Lions
1	Suresh Raina	₹95 million (US$990,000)
2	Ravindra Jadeja	₹55 million (US$570,000)
3	Brendon McCullum	₹32.5 million (US$340,000)
4	James Faulkner	₹51 million (US$530,000)
5	Dwayne Bravo	₹40 million (US$420,000)

== Retained players ==
Prior to the auction, teams could release players and retain those that they wanted for the next season. The salaries of the released players would be added to the salary purse of the teams which was increased to Rs. 66 crores for the 2016 edition. The salaries of the retained players was deducted from this purse.

== Transfers ==
The first trading window was open between 15 and 31 December 2015, and the second was open from 11 to 25 January 2016. After the players auction on 6 February 2016, a third window was open between 8 February and 19 February 2016.

The following transfers were made during the trading windows:

Player	From	To	Ref
Kedar Jadhav	Delhi Daredevils	Royal Challengers Bangalore	
Albie Morkel	Delhi Daredevils	Rising Pune Supergiants	
Saurabh Tiwary	Delhi Daredevils	Rising Pune Supergiants	
KL Rahul	Sunrisers Hyderabad	Royal Challengers Bangalore	
Parvez Rasool	Sunrisers Hyderabad	Royal Challengers Bangalore	

== Auction ==
The players auction for the 2016 Indian Premier League was held in Bangalore on 6 February 2016. All the eight franchises had taken part in the auction.

=== Sold players ===
Out of the 351 cricketers shortlisted, 94 were sold at the auction. 66 of these players were Indian and the remaining 28 were overseas cricketers. A total of ₹136 crore was spent by the eight franchises at the auction.

Player	Team	Base price (in ₹ lakhs)	Winning bid (in ₹ lakhs)
Kevin Pietersen	Rising Pune Supergiant	200	300
Dwayne Smith	Gujarat Lions	50	230
Ishant Sharma	Rising Pune Supergiant	200	380
Shane Watson	Royal Challengers Bangalore	200	950
Ashish Nehra	Sunrisers Hyderabad	200	550
Yuvraj Singh	Sunrisers Hyderabad	200	700
Dale Steyn	Gujarat Lions	150	230
Sanju Samson	Delhi Daredevils	200	420
Jos Buttler	Mumbai Indians	150	380
Dinesh Karthik	Gujarat Lions	200	230
Irfan Pathan	Rising Pune Supergiant	100	100
Chris Morris	Delhi Daredevils	50	700
Colin Munro	Kolkata Knight Riders	30	30
Stuart Binny	Royal Challengers Bangalore	200	200
Mitchell Marsh	Rising Pune Supergiant	200	480
Dhawal Kulkarni	Gujarat Lions	200	230
John Hastings	Kolkata Knight Riders	100	130
Praveen Kumar	Gujarat Lions	50	350
Tim Southee	Mumbai Indians	100	250
Mohit Sharma	Kings XI Punjab	150	650
Carlos Brathwaite	Delhi Daredevils	30	420
Marcus Stoinis	Kings XI Punjab	30	55
Mustafizur Rahman	Sunrisers Hyderabad	50	140
Jaydev Unadkat	Kolkata Knight Riders	30	160
Kyle Abbott	Kings XI Punjab	30	210
Barinder Sran	Sunrisers Hyderabad	50	120
Abhimanyu Mithun	Sunrisers Hyderabad	30	30
R. P. Singh	Rising Pune Supergiant	30	30
Travis Head	Royal Challengers Bangalore	30	50
Sachin Baby	Royal Challengers Bangalore	10	10
Karun Nair	Delhi Daredevils	10	400
Paras Dogra	Gujarat Lions	10	400
Ishan Kishan	Gujarat Lions	10	35
Rishabh Pant	Delhi Daredevils	10	190
Eklavya Dwivedi	Gujarat Lions	20	100
Aditya Tare	Sunrisers Hyderabad	20	120
Iqbal Abdulla	Royal Challengers Bangalore	10	10
Deepak Hooda	Sunrisers Hyderabad	10	420
Ankit Sharma	Rising Pune Supergiant	10	10
Pawan Negi	Delhi Daredevils	30	850
Rajat Bhatia	Rising Pune Supergiant	30	60
Pradeep Sangwan	Gujarat Lions	20	20
Nathu Singh	Mumbai Indians	10	320
Ishwar Pandey	Rising Pune Supergiant	20	20
Ankit Rajpoot	Kolkata Knight Riders	10	150
Pravin Tambe	Gujarat Lions	10	20
Shivil Kaushik	Gujarat Lions	10	10
Sarabjit Ladda	Gujarat Lions	10	10
Murugan Ashwin	Rising Pune Supergiant	10	450
KC Cariappa	Kings XI Punjab	10	80
Aaron Finch	Gujarat Lions	100	100
Sam Billings	Delhi Daredevils	30	30
Tirumalasetti Suman	Sunrisers Hyderabad	10	10
Ankush Bains	Rising Pune Supergiant	10	10
Umang Sharma	Gujarat Lions	10	10
Peter Handscomb	Rising Pune Supergiant	30	30
Jitesh Sharma	Mumbai Indians	10	10
Armaan Jaffer	Kings XI Punjab	10	10
Jason Holder	Kolkata Knight Riders	50	70
Thisara Perera	Rising Pune Supergiant	100	100
Ben Cutting	Sunrisers Hyderabad	50	50
Andrew Tye	Gujarat Lions	30	50
Praveen Dubey	Royal Challengers Bangalore	10	35
Rajagopal Sathish	Kolkata Knight Riders	20	20
Vijay Shankar	Sunrisers Hyderabad	10	35
Shadab Jakati	Gujarat Lions	20	20
Akshay Karnewar	Royal Challengers Bangalore	10	10
Akshdeep Nath	Gujarat Lions	10	10
Manan Sharma	Kolkata Knight Riders	10	10
Baba Aparajith	Rising Pune Supergiant	10	10
Deepak Chahar	Rising Pune Supergiant	10	10
Kishore Kamath	Mumbai Indians	10	140
Pardeep Sahu	Kings XI Punjab	10	10
Krunal Pandya	Mumbai Indians	10	200
Deepak Punia	Mumbai Indians	10	10
Swapnil Singh	Kings XI Punjab	10	10
Khaleel Ahmed	Delhi Daredevils	10	10
Jaydev Shah	Gujarat Lions	20	20
Pratyush Singh	Delhi Daredevils	10	10
Ashok Dinda	Rising Pune Supergiant	50	50
Kane Richardson	Royal Challengers Bangalore	200	200
Samuel Badree	Royal Challengers Bangalore	50	50
Joel Paris	Delhi Daredevils	30	30
Scott Boland	Rising Pune Supergiant	50	50
Vikramjeet Malik	Royal Challengers Bangalore	20	20
Pawan Suyal	Delhi Daredevils	10	10
Adam Zampa	Rising Pune Supergiant	30	30
Amit Mishra	Gujarat Lions	10	10
Jaskaran Singh	Rising Pune Supergiant	10	10
Chama Milind	Delhi Daredevils	10	10
Vikas Tokas	Royal Challengers Bangalore	10	10
Farhaan Behardien	Kings XI Punjab	30	30
Akhil Herwadkar	Delhi Daredevils	10	10
Mahipal Lomror	Delhi Daredevils	10	10

== Support staff changes ==
- In October 2015, Jacques Kallis was appointed head coach of the Kolkata Knight Riders. Kallis, who was the batting consultant during the 2015 season, replaced Trevor Bayliss at the position.
- In October 2015, Simon Katich was appointed assistant coach of Kolkata Knight Riders, replacing Vijay Dahiya.
- In December 2015, Anil Kumble stepped down as the mentor of Mumbai Indians.
- In December 2015, Gary Kirsten was sacked as the Delhi Daredevils head coach.
- In January 2016, Stephen Fleming was appointed as the head coach of Rising Pune Supergiants.
- In February 2016, Virender Sehwag was appointed as the mentor of Kings XI Punjab.
- In February 2016, Brad Hodge was appointed as the coach of Gujarat Lions.
- In February 2016, Rising Pune Supergiants appointed Hrishikesh Kanitkar as their assistant coach.
- In February 2016, Gujarat Lions appointed Heath Streak as their bowling coach.
- In February 2016, Rising Pune Supergiants appointed Eric Simons as their bowling coach.
- In March 2016, Paddy Upton was appointed head coach of the Delhi Daredevils, while Rahul Dravid was appointed as the team's mentor.

== Withdrawn players ==
The following players withdrew from the tournament either due to injuries or because of other reasons.

Player	Team	Reason	Announcement date	Replacement	Signing date
Joel Paris	Delhi Daredevils	Shin injury	7 April 2016		
Shaun Marsh	Kings XI Punjab	Back injury	2 May 2016	Hashim Amla	3 May 2016
Glenn Maxwell	Kings XI Punjab	Side strain	16 May 2016		
Marcus Stoinis	Kings XI Punjab	Personal reasons	17 May 2016		
John Hastings	Kolkata Knight Riders	Ankle injury	18 April 2016	Shaun Tait	11 May 2016
Lendl Simmons	Mumbai Indians	Lower back injury	13 April 2016	Martin Guptill	13 April 2016
Lasith Malinga	Mumbai Indians	Knee injury	17 April 2016	Jerome Taylor	27 April 2016
Kevin Pietersen	Rising Pune Supergiants	Calf injury	23 April 2016	Usman Khawaja	28 April 2016
Faf du Plessis	Rising Pune Supergiants	Broken finger	28 April 2016	George Bailey	2 May 2016
Mitchell Marsh	Rising Pune Supergiants	Side strain	1 May 2016		
Steve Smith	Rising Pune Supergiants	Wrist injury	1 May 2016		
Samuel Badree	Royal Challengers Bangalore	Shoulder injury	21 April 2016	Tabraiz Shamsi	21 April 2016
Mitchell Starc	Royal Challengers Bangalore	Fitness issue	25 April 2016	Chris Jordan	25 April 2016
Adam Milne	Royal Challengers Bangalore	Hamstring injury	6 May 2016		
Ashish Nehra	Sunrisers Hyderabad	Hamstring injury	19 May 2016		
