= List of Gujarat Lions cricketers =

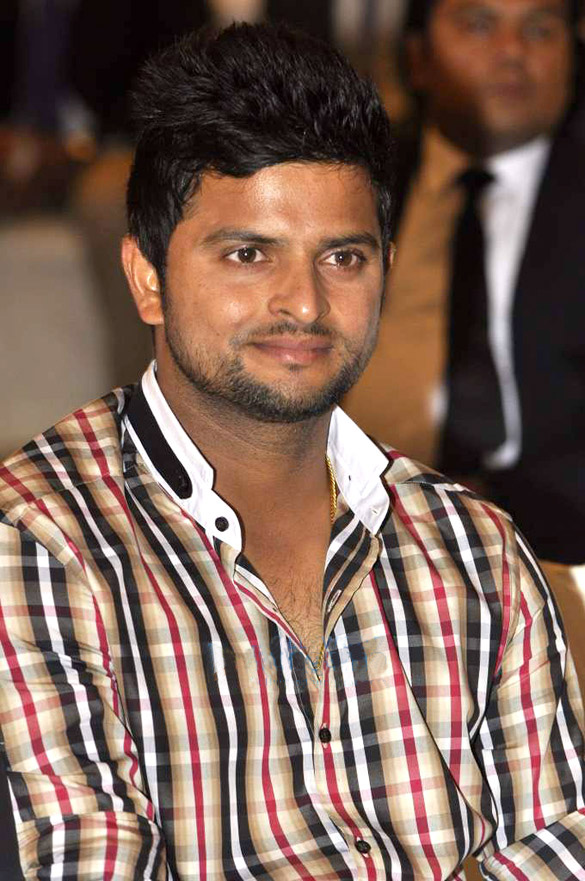
Suresh Raina captained the Gujarat Lions for all of its matches, except one

The Gujarat Lions (often abbreviated as GL) was a franchise cricket team based in Rajkot, Gujarat, that competed in the Indian Premier League (IPL) in 2016 and 2017. The team was owned by Intex Technologies, who won the bid in 2016, after two teams were suspended following a spot-fixing scandal.

In total, 29 players have played for GL. Dinesh Karthik made the most appearances, appearing in all thirty matches played by the team. Suresh Raina has scored the most runs for GL, with 841 runs. No player has scored a century for GL, with the highest individual score being 84, scored by Raina. Dhawal Kulkarni has taken the most wickets for GL, with 21 wickets to his name. The best bowling figures belong to Andrew Tye, with 5/17.

The team has been captained by Raina for all of its matches except one, during which Brendon McCullum was the captain. Dinesh Karthik has been the only wicket keeper for GL, with 19 catches and 3 stumpings. Raina has taken the most catches as a fielder, with 11 catches.

The first list includes all players who have played in at least one match for GL and is initially listed alphabetically by their last name. The second list comprises all those players who have captained the team in at least one match, arranged in the order of the first match as captain. Many players have also represented other teams of the IPL, but only the records of their games for GL are given. (Note: To sort these tables by any statistic, click on the icon in the column title.)

== Key ==
General
- † – Captain
- ‡ – Wicket-keeper
- First – Year of debut for GL
- Last – Year of last match for GL
- Mat – Number of matches played

Fielding

- Ca – Catches taken
- St – Stumpings effected
Batting
- Inn – Number of innings batted
- NO – Number of innings not out
- Runs – Runs scored in career
- HS – Highest score
- 100 – Centuries scored
- 50 – Half-centuries scored
- Avg – Runs scored per dismissal
- * – Batsman remained not out
Bowling
- Overs – Overs bowled in career
- Wkt – Wickets taken in career
- BBI – Best bowling in an innings
- Ave – Average runs per wicket
Captains
- Won – Number of games won
- Lost – Number of games lost
- NR – Number of games with no result
- Win% – Percentage of games won to those captained (Note: Games that did not have a result are included in calculating the win percentage.) (Note: The win–loss percentage is calculated using the formula: $\frac{Wins+\frac{1}{2}Ties}{Games}$)

== Players ==
Gujarat Lions capped cricketers
| General | | | | | Batting | | | | | | Bowling | | | | Fielding | |
| Name | Nationality (Note: The information in the nationality column is according to Cricinfo. This information may not necessarily reflect the player's birthplace or citizenship.) | First | Last | Mat | NO | Runs | HS | 100 | 50 | Avg | Overs | Wkt | BBI | Ave | Ca | St |
|---|---|---|---|---|---|---|---|---|---|---|---|---|---|---|---|---|
| Shubham Agarwal | India | 2017 | 2017 | 1 | - | - | - | - | - | - | 4.0 | 1 | 1/42 | 42.00 | 1 | - |
| Tejas Baroka | India | | | 1 | - | - | - | - | - | - | 3.3 | 0 | - | - | 0 | - |
| Dwayne Bravo | West Indies | 2016 | | 15 | 5 | 99 | 22 | 0 | 0 | 12.37 | 56.0 | 17 | 4/22 | 29.05 | 6 | - |
| Eklavya Dwivedi | India | 2016 | | 4 | - | - | - | - | - | - | 0.0 | - | - | - | 2 | - |
| James Faulkner | Australia | | 2017 | 15 | 4 | 131 | 32 | 0 | 0 | 18.71 | 43.2 | 8 | 2/34 | 53.12 | 6 | - |
| Aaron Finch | Australia | 2016 | 2017 | 26 | 3 | 692 | 74 | 0 | 7 | 31.45 | 0.0 | - | - | - | 8 | - |
| Manpreet Gony | India | | 2017 | 1 | - | - | - | - | - | - | 2.0 | 0 | - | - | 0 | - |
| Ravindra Jadeja | India | 2016 | 2017 | 27 | 12 | 349 | 36* | 0 | 0 | 26.84 | 78.1 | 13 | 2/18 | 50.76 | 6 | - |
| Shadab Jakati | India | 2016 | | 8 | 1 | 1 | 1* | 0 | 0 | - | 25.0 | 2 | 1/13 | 115.00 | 4 | - |
| Dinesh Karthik ‡ | India | 2016 | 2017 | 30 | 5 | 696 | 65 | 0 | 5 | 30.26 | 0.0 | - | - | - | 19 | 3 |
| Shivil Kaushik | India | 2016 | | 10 | 1 | 0 | 0* | 0 | 0 | 0.00 | 34.0 | 6 | 3/20 | 49.50 | 0 | - |
| Ishan Kishan | India | | 2017 | 16 | 0 | 319 | 61 | 0 | 1 | 21.26 | 0.0 | - | - | - | 4 | - |
| Dhawal Kulkarni | India | 2016 | 2017 | 20 | 3 | 28 | 10 | 0 | 0 | 9.33 | 67.5 | 21 | 4/14 | 25.57 | 3 | - |
| Praveen Kumar | India | 2016 | 2017 | 1 | 4 | 32 | 15 | 0 | 0 | 6.40 | 68.0 | 15 | 2/19 | 36.80 | 2 | - |
| Sarabjit Ladda | India | 2016 | | 1 | - | - | - | - | - | - | 2.0 | - | - | - | 0 | - |
| Brendon McCullum † | New Zealand | 2016 | 2017 | 27 | 0 | 673 | 72 | 0 | 3 | 24.92 | 0.0 | - | - | - | 8 | - |
| Akshdeep Nath | India | 2016 | | 5 | 0 | 20 | 12 | 0 | 0 | 5.00 | 0.0 | - | - | - | 0 | - |
| Munaf Patel | India | | 2017 | 2 | 0 | 0 | 0 | 0 | 0 | 0.00 | 7.0 | 1 | 1/35 | 57.00 | 0 | - |
| Irfan Pathan | India | 2017 | 2017 | 1 | 0 | 2 | 2 | 0 | 0 | 2.00 | 2.0 | 0 | - | - | 0 | - |
| Suresh Raina † | India | 2016 | 2017 | 29 | 4 | 841 | 84 | 0 | 6 | 33.64 | 22.0 | 1 | 1/11 | 184.00 | 11 | 0 |
| Jason Roy | England | | 2017 | 3 | 1 | 59 | 31 | 0 | 0 | 29.50 | 0.0 | - | - | - | 1 | - |
| Nathu Singh | India | | 2017 | 2 | - | - | - | - | - | - | 4.0 | 1 | 1/7 | 15.00 | 0 | - |
| Pradeep Sangwan | India | | 2017 | 7 | 1 | 2 | 1* | 0 | 0 | 1.00 | 22.0 | 5 | 2/38 | 46.00 | 1 | - |
| Dwayne Smith | West Indies | 2016 | 2017 | 24 | 2 | 563 | 74 | 0 | 5 | 25.59 | 31.0 | 10 | 4/8 | 30.10 | 10 | - |
| Ankit Soni | India | | 2017 | 7 | 1 | 7 | 7* | 0 | 0 | 3.50 | 18.1 | 2 | 1/16 | 72.00 | 1 | - |
| Dale Steyn | South Africa | 2016 | 2016 | 1 | 1 | 1 | 1 | 0 | 0 | 1.00 | 2.0 | 0 | - | - | 0 | - |
| Pravin Tambe | India | 2016 | 2016 | 7 | 1 | 7 | 7* | 0 | 0 | - | 16.0 | 5 | 2/12 | 28.60 | 1 | - |
| Basil Thampi | India | 2017 | 2017 | 12 | 5 | 28 | 13* | 0 | 0 | - | 44.4 | 11 | 3/29 | 38.54 | 2 | - |
| Andrew Tye | Australia | 2017 | 2017 | 6 | 1 | 53 | 25 | 0 | 0 | 26.50 | 21.0 | 12 | 5/17 | 11.75 | 0 | - |

== Captains ==
Gujarat Lions captains
| No. | Name | First | Last | Mat | Won | Lost | | NR | Win% |
|---|---|---|---|---|---|---|---|---|---|
| 1 | Suresh Raina † | 2016 | 2017 | 29 | 13 | 15 | 1 | 0 | 46.55 |
| 2 | Brendon McCullum † | | | 1 | 0 | 1 | 0 | 0 | 0.00 |
| Total | | | | 30 | 13 | 16 | 1 | 0 | 46. |

== See also ==
- List of Indian Premier League centuries
- List of Indian Premier League records and statistics
