= 2016 Gujarat Lions season =

Indian Premier League cricket team season

Gujarat Lions
2016 Indian Premier League season
- Coach: Brad Hodge
- Captain: Suresh Raina
- IPL: Playoffs (3rd)

Gujarat Lions were a franchise cricket team based in Rajkot, Gujarat, India, which played in the Indian Premier League (IPL) for two seasons between 2016 and 2017. They were one of the eight teams which competed in the 2016 Indian Premier League. The team was captained by Suresh Raina and coached by Brad Hodge.

== Standings ==
Pos	Team	Pld	W	L	NR	Pts	NRR	
1	Gujarat Lions (3)	14	9	5	0	18	−0.374	Advanced to Qualifier 1
2	Royal Challengers Bangalore (RU)	14	8	6	0	16	0.932	Advanced to Qualifier 1
3	Sunrisers Hyderabad (C)	14	8	6	0	16	0.245	Advanced to the Eliminator
4	Kolkata Knight Riders (4)	14	8	6	0	16	0.106	Advanced to the Eliminator
5	Mumbai Indians	14	7	7	0	14	−0.146	
6	Delhi Daredevils	14	7	7	0	14	−0.155	
7	Rising Pune Supergiants	14	5	9	0	10	0.015	
8	Kings XI Punjab	14	4	10	0	8	−0.646	

The four top ranked teams qualified for the playoffs

== Squad ==
- Suresh Raina (Captain)
- Brendon McCullum (Vice Captain, Overseas - New Zealand)
- Eklavya Dwivedi (Wicket Keeper)
- Dinesh Karthik (Wicket Keeper)
- Sarabjit Ladda
- Akshdeep Nath
- Amit Mishra
- Dwayne Bravo (Overseas - West Indies)
- Paras Dogra
- James Faulkner (Overseas - Australia)
- Aaron Finch (Overseas - Australia)
- Ishan Kishan
- Ravindra Jadeja
- Shadab Jakati
- Shivil Kaushik
- Dhawal Kulkarni
- Praveen Kumar
- Pradeep Sangwan
- Jaydev Shah
- Umang Sharma
- Dwayne Smith (Overseas - West Indies)
- Dale Steyn (Overseas - South Africa)
- Pravin Tambe
- Andrew Tye (Overseas - Australia)

== Match log ==
No.	Date	Opponent	Venue	Result	Man of the Match	Scorecard link
1	11 April 2016	Kings XI Punjab	Mohali	Won by 5 wickets	Aaron Finch - 74 (47)	Scorecard
2	14 April 2016	Rising Pune Supergiant	Rajkot	Won by 7 wickets	Aaron Finch - 50 (36)	Scorecard
3	16 April 2016	Mumbai Indians	Mumbai	Won by 3 wickets	Aaron Finch - 67* (54)	Scorecard
4	21 April 2016	Sunrisers Hyderabad	Rajkot	Lost by 10 wickets		Scorecard
5	24 April 2016	Royal Challengers Bangalore	Rajkot	Won by 6 wickets		Scorecard
6	27 April 2016	Delhi Daredevils	Delhi	Won by 1 run		Scorecard
7	29 April 2016	Rising Pune Supergiant	Pune	Won by 3 wickets	Dwayne Smith 63 (37)	Scorecard
8	1 May 2016	Kings XI Punjab	Rajkot	Lost by 23 runs		Scorecard
9	3 May 2016	Delhi Daredevils	Rajkot	Lost by 8 wickets		Scorecard
10	6 May 2016	Sunrisers Hyderabad	Hyderabad	Lost by 5 wickets		Scorecard
11	8 May 2016	Kolkata Knight Riders	Kolkata	Won by 5 wickets	Praveen Kumar 2/19 (4 Overs)	Scorecard
12	14 May 2016	Royal Challengers Bangalore	Bangalore	Lost by 144 runs		Scorecard
13	19 May 2016	Kolkata Knight Riders	Kanpur	Won by 6 wickets	Dwayne Smith 4/8 (4 Overs)	Scorecard
14	21 May 2016	Mumbai Indians	Kanpur	Won by 7 wickets	Suresh Raina 58(36)	Scorecard

=== Qualifier 1 ===
Date	Opponent	Venue	Result	Man of the Match	Scorecard link
24 May 2016	Royal Challengers Bangalore	Bangalore	Lost by 4 wickets		Scorecard

=== Qualifier 2 ===
Date	Opponent	Venue	Result	Man of the Match	Scorecard link
27 May 2016	Sunrisers Hyderabad	Delhi	Lost by 4 wickets		Scorecard
