= 2016 Sunrisers Hyderabad season =

Indian Premier League cricket team season

SunRisers Hyderabad
2016 season
- Coach: Tom Moody
- Captain: David Warner
- Ground(s): Rajiv Gandhi International Cricket Stadium, Hyderabad (Capacity: 55,000)
- IPL: Champions (1st title)
- Most runs: David Warner (848)
- Most wickets: Bhuvneshwar Kumar (23)
- Most catches: Moisés Henriques (11)
- Most wicket-keeping dismissals: Naman Ojha (18)

Sunrisers Hyderabad (SRH) are a franchise cricket team based in Hyderabad, India, which plays in the Indian Premier League (IPL). They were one of the eight teams that competed in the 2016 Indian Premier League, their fourth outing in the competition. The team was captained by David Warner and coached by Tom Moody with Muttiah Muralitharan as bowling coach and VVS Laxman as mentor. They started their campaign against Royal Challengers Bangalore on 12 April 2016 on a losing note but went on to win their first IPL title, beating the same opposition in the final on 29 May 2016 by 8 runs. In the process, they became the first team to win both, the Eliminator match and Qualifier 2 before winning the final. Ben Cutting was declared the man of the match in the final and Mustafizur Rahman was declared as the emerging player of the season. Bhuvneshwar Kumar won the Purple Cap for taking 23 wickets in this IPL.

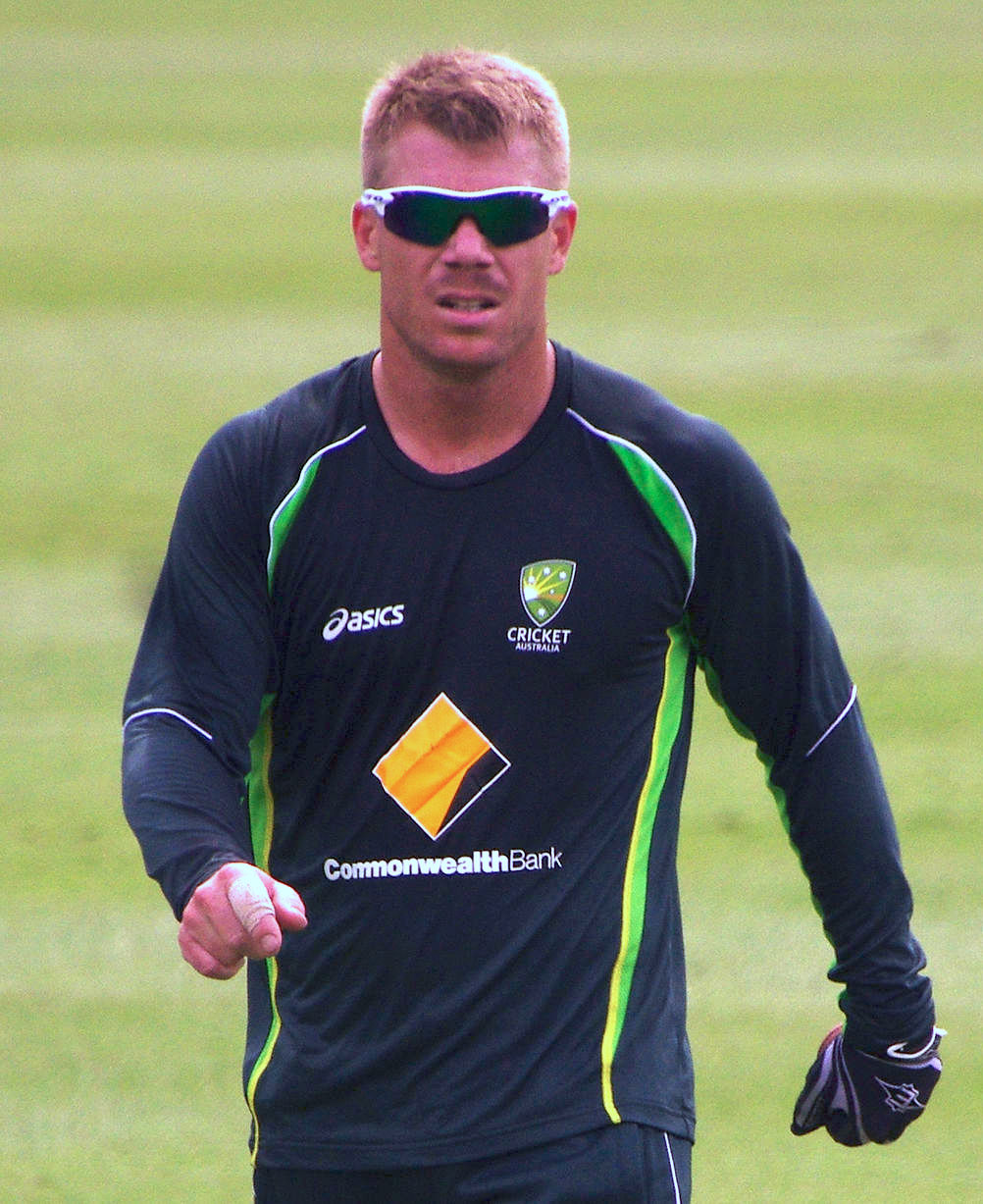
David Warner captained SRH for IPL 2016

== Administration and support staff ==
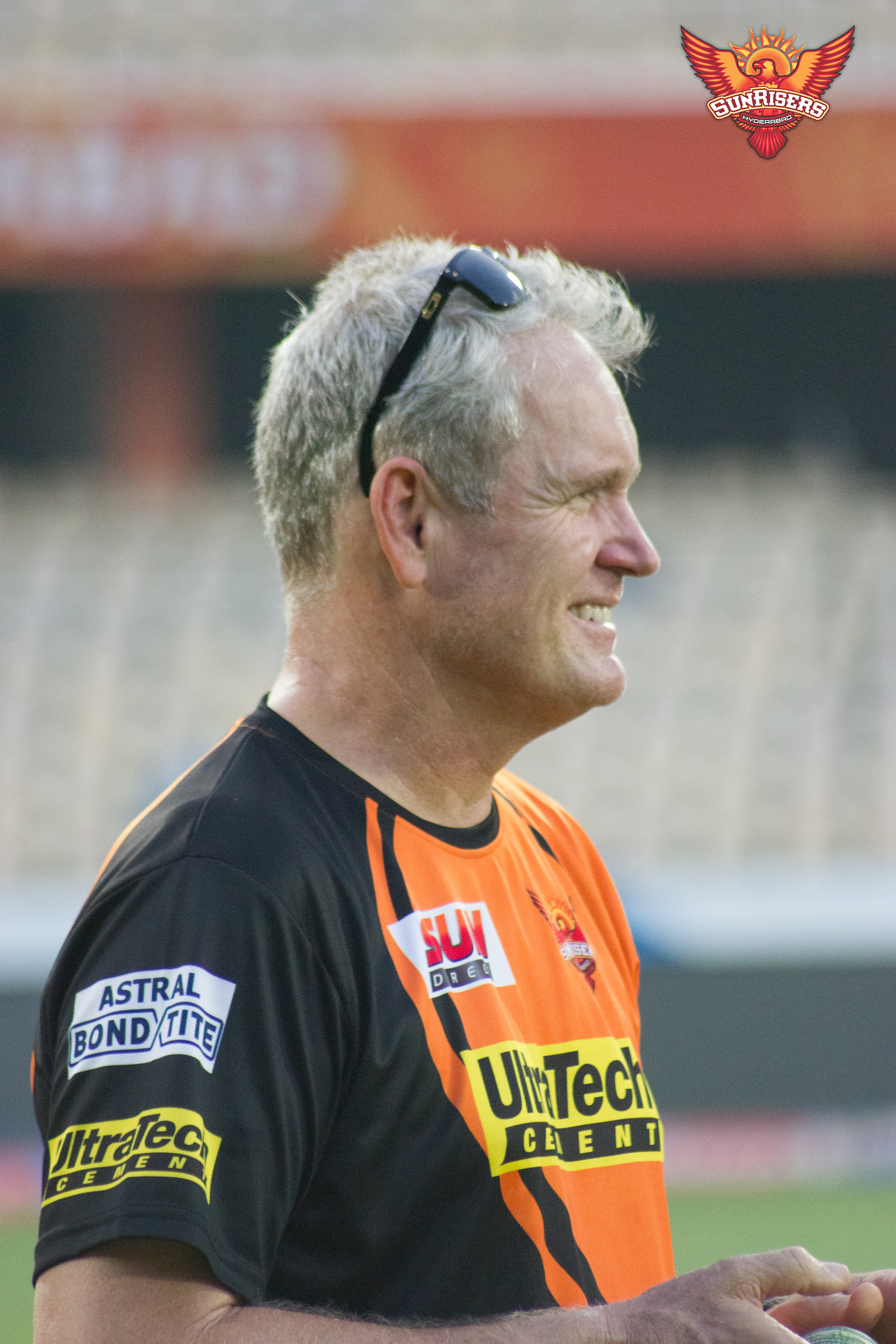
Tom Moody coached SRH in IPL 2016

- Owner – Kalanithi Maran (Sun Network)
- Head coach – Tom Moody
- Assistant coach – Simon Helmot
- Bowling coach – Muttiah Muralitharan
- Mentor – VVS Laxman
Source :

== Kit manufacturers and sponsors ==
Kit Manufacturers	Shirt Sponsor (Chest)	Shirt Sponsor (Back)
TYKA	UltraTech Cement	Idea

== Players auction ==
The players auction for the 2016 Indian Premier League held in Bangalore on 6 February 2016. All eight franchises had participated in the auction. SRH has retained 15 players and released 9 players from the previous season. Due to this effort SRH Spent ₹358.5 million (US$3.7 million) and kept the balance ₹301.5 million (US$3.1 million) Added 10 players to the team.

Retained Players: David Warner, Shikhar Dhawan, Ashish Reddy, Naman Ojha, Eoin Morgan, Karn Sharma, Moises Henriques, Kane Williamson, Trent Boult, Ricky Bhui, Bhuvneshwar Kumar, Siddarth Kaul, Bipul Sharma

Released Players: Dale Steyn, Kevin Pietersen, Ishant Sharma, Praveen Kumar, Chama Milind, Hanuma Vihari, Ravi Bopara, Padmanabhan Prasanth and Laxmi Ratan Shukla

Added Players: Yuvraj Singh, Ashish Nehra, Ben Cutting, Tirumalasetti Suman, Deepak Hooda, Mustafizur Rahman, Aditya Tare, Barinder Sran, Vijay Shankar and Abhimanyu Mithun

Traded Players: KL Rahul, Parveez Rasool

== Squad ==
- Players with international caps are listed in **bold**.

Name	Nationality	Birth date	Batting style	Bowling style	Year signed	Notes
Batsmen
**Kane Williamson**	New Zealand	8 August 1990 (aged 25)	Right-handed	Right-arm off break	2015	Overseas.
**Eoin Morgan**	England	10 September 1986 (aged 29)	Left-handed	Right-arm medium	2015	Overseas.
**Shikhar Dhawan**	India	5 December 1985 (aged 30)	Left-handed	Right-arm off break	2013	
**David Warner**	Australia	27 October 1986 (aged 29)	Left-handed	Right-arm leg break	2014	Captain, Overseas.
Ricky Bhui	India	29 November 1996 (aged 19)	Right-handed	Right-arm leg break	2014	
Tirumalasetti Suman	India	15 December 1983 (aged 32)	Right-handed	Right-arm off break	2016	
All-rounders
**Moisés Henriques**	Australia	1 February 1987 (aged 29)	Right-handed	Right-arm medium-fast	2014	Overseas.
**Yuvraj Singh**	India	12 December 1981 (aged 34)	Left-handed	Slow left-arm orthodox	2016	
Deepak Hooda	India	19 April 1995 (aged 20)	Right-handed	Right-arm off break	2016	
Bipul Sharma	India	28 September 1983 (aged 32)	Left-handed	Slow left-arm orthodox	2015	
Ben Cutting	Australia	30 January 1987 (aged 29)	Right-handed	Right-arm medium-fast	2016	Overseas.
Vijay Shankar	India	26 January 1991 (aged 25)	Right-handed	Right-arm medium	2016	
Ashish Reddy	India	24 February 1991 (aged 25)	Right-handed	Right-arm medium	2014	
Wicket-keepers
**Naman Ojha**	India	20 July 1983 (aged 32)	Right-handed	Right-arm medium	2014	
Aditya Tare	India	7 November 1987 (aged 28)	Right-handed	Right-arm wicket keeper	2016	
Bowlers
Siddarth Kaul	India	19 May 1990 (aged 25)	Right-handed	Right-arm medium-fast	2016	
**Bhuvneshwar Kumar**	India	5 February 1990 (aged 26)	Right-handed	Right-arm medium-fast	2014	
**Trent Boult**	New Zealand	22 July 1989 (aged 26)	Right-handed	Left-arm medium-fast	2015	Overseas.
**Barinder Sran**	India	10 December 1992 (aged 23)	Left-handed	Left-arm fast-medium	2016	
**Ashish Nehra**	India	29 April 1979 (aged 36)	Right-handed	Left-arm medium-fast	2016	Withdrew due to hamstring injury.
**Mustafizur Rahman**	Bangladesh	6 September 1995 (aged 20)	Left-handed	Left-arm fast-medium	2016	Overseas.
**Abhimanyu Mithun**	India	25 October 1989 (aged 26)	Right-handed	Right-arm medium-fast	2016	
**Karn Sharma**	India	23 October 1987 (aged 28)	Left-handed	Right-arm leg break	2013	

== Standings ==
Pos	Team	Pld	W	L	NR	Pts	NRR	
1	Gujarat Lions (3)	14	9	5	0	18	−0.374	Advanced to Qualifier 1
2	Royal Challengers Bangalore (RU)	14	8	6	0	16	0.932	Advanced to Qualifier 1
3	Sunrisers Hyderabad (C)	14	8	6	0	16	0.245	Advanced to the Eliminator
4	Kolkata Knight Riders (4)	14	8	6	0	16	0.106	Advanced to the Eliminator
5	Mumbai Indians	14	7	7	0	14	−0.146	
6	Delhi Daredevils	14	7	7	0	14	−0.155	
7	Rising Pune Supergiants	14	5	9	0	10	0.015	
8	Kings XI Punjab	14	4	10	0	8	−0.646	

The four top ranked teams qualified for the playoffs

=== Results by match ===
Match	1	2	3	4	5	6	7	8	9	10	11	12	13	14
Ground	A	H	H	A	H	H	H	H	A	A	H	A	A	A
Result	L	L	W	W	W	L	W	W	W	W	L	W	L	L

Source: Fixtures
A = Away; H = Home; W = Win; D = Draw; L = Loss

== Fixtures ==
=== League stage ===
12 April	(H) Royal Challengers Bangalore; 227/4 (20 overs)	v	Sunrisers Hyderabad; 182/6 (20 overs)	Royal Challengers Bangalore won by 45 runs
20:00; Scorecard	(H) Royal Challengers Bangalore; 227/4 (20 overs)	v	Sunrisers Hyderabad; 182/6 (20 overs)	M. Chinnaswamy Stadium, Bangalore; Umpires: Kumar Dharmasena (Sri Lanka) and Virender Sharma (India); Player of the match: AB de Villiers (Royal Challengers Bangalore)
20:00; Scorecard	AB de Villiers 82 (42); Mustafi zur Rahman 2/26 (4 overs)		David Warner 58 (25); Shane Watson 2/30 (4 overs)	M. Chinnaswamy Stadium, Bangalore; Umpires: Kumar Dharmasena (Sri Lanka) and Virender Sharma (India); Player of the match: AB de Villiers (Royal Challengers Bangalore)
Sunrisers Hyderabad won the toss and elected to field.				M. Chinnaswamy Stadium, Bangalore; Umpires: Kumar Dharmasena (Sri Lanka) and Virender Sharma (India); Player of the match: AB de Villiers (Royal Challengers Bangalore)

16 April	(H) Sunrisers Hyderabad; 142/7 (20 overs)	v	Kolkata Knight Riders; 146/2 (18.2 overs)	Kolkata Knight Riders won by 8 wickets
16:00; Scorecard	(H) Sunrisers Hyderabad; 142/7 (20 overs)	v	Kolkata Knight Riders; 146/2 (18.2 overs)	Rajiv Gandhi International Stadium, Hyderabad; Umpires: Anil Chaudhary (India) and C. K. Nandan (India); Player of the match: Gautam Gambhir (Kolkata Knight Riders)
16:00; Scorecard	Eoin Morgan 51 (43); Umesh Yadav 3/28 (4 overs)		Gautam Gambhir 90* (60); Ashish Reddy 1/14 (2 overs)	Rajiv Gandhi International Stadium, Hyderabad; Umpires: Anil Chaudhary (India) and C. K. Nandan (India); Player of the match: Gautam Gambhir (Kolkata Knight Riders)
Sunrisers Hyderabad won the toss and elected to bat.				Rajiv Gandhi International Stadium, Hyderabad; Umpires: Anil Chaudhary (India) and C. K. Nandan (India); Player of the match: Gautam Gambhir (Kolkata Knight Riders)

18 April	Mumbai Indians; 142/6 (20 overs)	v	Sunrisers Hyderabad (H); 145/3 (17.3 overs)	Sunrisers Hyderabad won by 7 wickets
20:00; Scorecard	Mumbai Indians; 142/6 (20 overs)	v	Sunrisers Hyderabad (H); 145/3 (17.3 overs)	Rajiv Gandhi International Stadium, Hyderabad; Umpires: Kumar Dharmasena (Sri Lanka) and Virender Sharma (India); Player of the match: David Warner (Sunrisers Hyderabad)
20:00; Scorecard	Ambati Rayudu 54 (49); Barinder Sran 3/28 (4 overs)		David Warner 90* (59); Tim Southee 3/24 (4 overs)	Rajiv Gandhi International Stadium, Hyderabad; Umpires: Kumar Dharmasena (Sri Lanka) and Virender Sharma (India); Player of the match: David Warner (Sunrisers Hyderabad)
Sunrisers Hyderabad won the toss and elected to field.				Rajiv Gandhi International Stadium, Hyderabad; Umpires: Kumar Dharmasena (Sri Lanka) and Virender Sharma (India); Player of the match: David Warner (Sunrisers Hyderabad)

21 April	(H) Gujarat Lions; 135/8 (20 overs)	v	Sunrisers Hyderabad; 137/0 (14.5 overs)	Sunrisers Hyderabad won by 10 wickets
20:00; Scorecard	(H) Gujarat Lions; 135/8 (20 overs)	v	Sunrisers Hyderabad; 137/0 (14.5 overs)	Saurashtra Cricket Association Stadium, Rajkot; Umpires: Krishnamachari Bharatan (India) and Kumar Dharmasena (Sri Lanka); Player of the match: Bhuvneshwar Kumar (Sunrisers Hyderabad)
20:00; Scorecard	Suresh Raina 75 (51); Bhuvneshwar Kumar 4/29 (4 overs)		David Warner 74* (48); Ravindra Jadeja 0/20 (2.5 overs)	Saurashtra Cricket Association Stadium, Rajkot; Umpires: Krishnamachari Bharatan (India) and Kumar Dharmasena (Sri Lanka); Player of the match: Bhuvneshwar Kumar (Sunrisers Hyderabad)
Sunrisers Hyderabad won the toss and elected to field.				Saurashtra Cricket Association Stadium, Rajkot; Umpires: Krishnamachari Bharatan (India) and Kumar Dharmasena (Sri Lanka); Player of the match: Bhuvneshwar Kumar (Sunrisers Hyderabad)

23 April	(H) Sunrisers Hyderabad; 146/5 (17.5 overs)	v	Kings XI Punjab; 143/6 (20 overs)	Sunrisers Hyderabad won by 5 wickets
20:00; Scorecard	(H) Sunrisers Hyderabad; 146/5 (17.5 overs)	v	Kings XI Punjab; 143/6 (20 overs)	Rajiv Gandhi International Stadium, Uppal, Hyderabad; Umpires: Anil Chaudhary (India) and C. K. Nandan (India); Player of the match: Mustafizur Rahman (Sunrisers Hyderabad)
20:00; Scorecard	David Warner 59 (31); Mohit Sharma 1/20 (3 overs)		Shaun Marsh 40 (34); Mustafizur Rahman 2/9 (4 overs)	Rajiv Gandhi International Stadium, Uppal, Hyderabad; Umpires: Anil Chaudhary (India) and C. K. Nandan (India); Player of the match: Mustafizur Rahman (Sunrisers Hyderabad)
Sunrisers Hyderabad won the toss and elected to field.				Rajiv Gandhi International Stadium, Uppal, Hyderabad; Umpires: Anil Chaudhary (India) and C. K. Nandan (India); Player of the match: Mustafizur Rahman (Sunrisers Hyderabad)

26 April	(H) Sunrisers Hyderabad; 118/8 (20 overs)	v	Rising Pune Supergiant; 94/3 (11 overs)	Rising Pune Supergiants won by 34 runs (D/L method)
20:00; Scorecard	(H) Sunrisers Hyderabad; 118/8 (20 overs)	v	Rising Pune Supergiant; 94/3 (11 overs)	Rajiv Gandhi International Stadium, Uppal, Hyderabad; Umpires: Anil Dandekar (India) and C. K. Nandan (India); Player of the match: Ashok Dinda (Rising Pune Supergiants)
20:00; Scorecard	Shikhar Dhawan 56 (53); Ashok Dinda 3/23 (4 overs)		Steve Smith 46* (36); Bhuvneshwar Kumar 1/17 (3 overs)	Rajiv Gandhi International Stadium, Uppal, Hyderabad; Umpires: Anil Dandekar (India) and C. K. Nandan (India); Player of the match: Ashok Dinda (Rising Pune Supergiants)
Rising Pune Supergiants won the toss and elected to field.				Rajiv Gandhi International Stadium, Uppal, Hyderabad; Umpires: Anil Dandekar (India) and C. K. Nandan (India); Player of the match: Ashok Dinda (Rising Pune Supergiants)

30 April	(H) Sunrisers Hyderabad; 194/5 (20 overs)	v	Royal Challengers Bangalore; 179/6 (20 overs)	Sunrisers Hyderabad won by 15 runs
20:00 (D/N); Scorecard	(H) Sunrisers Hyderabad; 194/5 (20 overs)	v	Royal Challengers Bangalore; 179/6 (20 overs)	Rajiv Gandhi International Cricket Stadium, Hyderabad; Umpires: Anil Chaudhary (India) and Kumar Dharmasena (Sri Lanka); Player of the match: David Warner (Sunrisers Hyderabad)
20:00 (D/N); Scorecard	David Warner 92 (50); Kane Richardson 2/45 (4 overs)		KL Rahul 51 (28); Ashish Nehra 1/32 (4 overs)	Rajiv Gandhi International Cricket Stadium, Hyderabad; Umpires: Anil Chaudhary (India) and Kumar Dharmasena (Sri Lanka); Player of the match: David Warner (Sunrisers Hyderabad)
Royal Challengers Bangalore won the toss and elected to field.; Rain delayed the toss and the start of play by an hour but no overs were lost from play.				Rajiv Gandhi International Cricket Stadium, Hyderabad; Umpires: Anil Chaudhary (India) and Kumar Dharmasena (Sri Lanka); Player of the match: David Warner (Sunrisers Hyderabad)

6 May	Gujarat Lions; 126/6 (20 overs)	v	Sunrisers Hyderabad (H); 129/5 (19 overs)	Sunrisers Hyderabad won by 5 wickets
20:00 (D/N); Scorecard	Gujarat Lions; 126/6 (20 overs)	v	Sunrisers Hyderabad (H); 129/5 (19 overs)	Rajiv Gandhi International Cricket Stadium, Hyderabad; Umpires: Marais Erasmus (South Africa) and Sundaram Ravi (India); Player of the match: Bhuvneshwar Kumar (Sunrisers Hyderabad)
20:00 (D/N); Scorecard	Aaron Finch 51* (42); Mustafizur Rahman 2/17 (4 overs)		Shikhar Dhawan 47* (40); Dwayne Bravo 2/14 (3 overs)	Rajiv Gandhi International Cricket Stadium, Hyderabad; Umpires: Marais Erasmus (South Africa) and Sundaram Ravi (India); Player of the match: Bhuvneshwar Kumar (Sunrisers Hyderabad)
Sunrisers Hyderabad won the toss and elected to field.				Rajiv Gandhi International Cricket Stadium, Hyderabad; Umpires: Marais Erasmus (South Africa) and Sundaram Ravi (India); Player of the match: Bhuvneshwar Kumar (Sunrisers Hyderabad)

8 May	Sunrisers Hyderabad; 177/3 (20 overs)	v	Mumbai Indians (H); 92 (16.3 overs)	Sunrisers Hyderabad won by 85 runs
16:00 (D/N); Scorecard	Sunrisers Hyderabad; 177/3 (20 overs)	v	Mumbai Indians (H); 92 (16.3 overs)	Dr. Y.S. Rajasekhara Reddy ACA-VDCA Cricket Stadium, Visakhapatnam; Umpires: Sundaram Ravi (India) and Chettithody Shamshuddin (India); Player of the match: Ashish Nehra (Sunrisers Hyderabad)
16:00 (D/N); Scorecard	Shikhar Dhawan 82* (57); Harbhajan Singh 2/29 (4 overs)		Harbhajan Singh 21* (22); Ashish Nehra 3/15 (3 overs)	Dr. Y.S. Rajasekhara Reddy ACA-VDCA Cricket Stadium, Visakhapatnam; Umpires: Sundaram Ravi (India) and Chettithody Shamshuddin (India); Player of the match: Ashish Nehra (Sunrisers Hyderabad)
Mumbai Indians won the toss and elected to field.				Dr. Y.S. Rajasekhara Reddy ACA-VDCA Cricket Stadium, Visakhapatnam; Umpires: Sundaram Ravi (India) and Chettithody Shamshuddin (India); Player of the match: Ashish Nehra (Sunrisers Hyderabad)

10 May	Sunrisers Hyderabad; 137/8 (20 overs)	v	Rising Pune Supergiant (H); 133/8 (20 overs)	Sunrisers Hyderabad won by 4 runs
20:00 (D/N); Scorecard	Sunrisers Hyderabad; 137/8 (20 overs)	v	Rising Pune Supergiant (H); 133/8 (20 overs)	Dr. Y.S. Rajasekhara Reddy ACA-VDCA Cricket Stadium, Visakhapatnam; Umpires: Chris Gaffaney (New Zealand) and Virender Sharma (India); Player of the match: Adam Zampa (Rising Pune Supergiants)
20:00 (D/N); Scorecard	Shikhar Dhawan 33 (27); Adam Zampa 6/19 (4 overs)		George Bailey 34 (40); Ashish Nehra 3/29 (4 overs)	Dr. Y.S. Rajasekhara Reddy ACA-VDCA Cricket Stadium, Visakhapatnam; Umpires: Chris Gaffaney (New Zealand) and Virender Sharma (India); Player of the match: Adam Zampa (Rising Pune Supergiants)
Sunrisers Hyderabad won the toss and elected to bat.				Dr. Y.S. Rajasekhara Reddy ACA-VDCA Cricket Stadium, Visakhapatnam; Umpires: Chris Gaffaney (New Zealand) and Virender Sharma (India); Player of the match: Adam Zampa (Rising Pune Supergiants)

12 May	(H) Sunrisers Hyderabad; 146/8 (20 overs)	v	Delhi Daredevils; 150/3 (18.1 overs)	Delhi Daredevils won by 7 wickets
20:00 (D/N); Scorecard	(H) Sunrisers Hyderabad; 146/8 (20 overs)	v	Delhi Daredevils; 150/3 (18.1 overs)	Rajiv Gandhi International Cricket Stadium, Hyderabad; Umpires: Krishnamachari Bharatan (India) and Marais Erasmus (South Africa); Player of the match: Chris Morris (Delhi Daredevils)
20:00 (D/N); Scorecard	David Warner 46 (30); Amit Mishra 2/19 (3 overs)		Quinton de Kock 44 (31); Moises Henriques 2/19 (3 overs)	Rajiv Gandhi International Cricket Stadium, Hyderabad; Umpires: Krishnamachari Bharatan (India) and Marais Erasmus (South Africa); Player of the match: Chris Morris (Delhi Daredevils)
Delhi Daredevils won the toss and elected to field.				Rajiv Gandhi International Cricket Stadium, Hyderabad; Umpires: Krishnamachari Bharatan (India) and Marais Erasmus (South Africa); Player of the match: Chris Morris (Delhi Daredevils)

15 May	(H) Kings XI Punjab; 179/4 (20 overs)	v	Sunrisers Hyderabad; 180/3 (19.4 overs)	Sunrisers Hyderabad won by 7 wickets
16:00 (D/N); Scorecard	(H) Kings XI Punjab; 179/4 (20 overs)	v	Sunrisers Hyderabad; 180/3 (19.4 overs)	Punjab Cricket Association IS Bindra Stadium, Mohali; Umpires: K. N. Ananthapadmanabhan (India) and Marais Erasmus (South Africa); Player of the match: Hashim Amla (Kings XI Punjab)
16:00 (D/N); Scorecard	Hashim Amla 96 (56); Bhuvneshwar Kumar 2/32 (4 overs)		David Warner 52 (41); Axar Patel 1/26 (4 overs)	Punjab Cricket Association IS Bindra Stadium, Mohali; Umpires: K. N. Ananthapadmanabhan (India) and Marais Erasmus (South Africa); Player of the match: Hashim Amla (Kings XI Punjab)
Kings XI Punjab won the toss and elected to bat.				Punjab Cricket Association IS Bindra Stadium, Mohali; Umpires: K. N. Ananthapadmanabhan (India) and Marais Erasmus (South Africa); Player of the match: Hashim Amla (Kings XI Punjab)

20 May	(H) Delhi Daredevils; 161/4 (20 overs)	v	Sunrisers Hyderabad; 158/7 (20 overs)	Delhi Daredevils won by 6 wickets
20:00 (D/N); Scorecard	(H) Delhi Daredevils; 161/4 (20 overs)	v	Sunrisers Hyderabad; 158/7 (20 overs)	Shaheed Veer Narayan Singh International Stadium, Raipur; Umpires: Nand Kishore (India) and Bruce Oxenford (Australia); Player of the match: Karun Nair (Delhi Daredevils)
20:00 (D/N); Scorecard	Karun Nair 83* (59); Carlos Brathwaite 2/27 (4 overs)		David Warner 73 (56); Barinder Sran 2/34 (4 overs)	Shaheed Veer Narayan Singh International Stadium, Raipur; Umpires: Nand Kishore (India) and Bruce Oxenford (Australia); Player of the match: Karun Nair (Delhi Daredevils)
Delhi Daredevils won the toss and elected to field.				Shaheed Veer Narayan Singh International Stadium, Raipur; Umpires: Nand Kishore (India) and Bruce Oxenford (Australia); Player of the match: Karun Nair (Delhi Daredevils)

22 May	(H) Kolkata Knight Riders; 171/6 (20 overs)	v	Sunrisers Hyderabad; 149/8 (20 overs)	Kolkata Knight Riders won by 22 runs
16:00 (D/N); Scorecard	(H) Kolkata Knight Riders; 171/6 (20 overs)	v	Sunrisers Hyderabad; 149/8 (20 overs)	Eden Gardens, Kolkata; Umpires: K. N. Ananthapadmanabhan (India) and Marais Erasmus (South Africa); Player of the match: Yusuf Pathan (Kolkata Knight Riders)
16:00 (D/N); Scorecard	Yusuf Pathan 52* (34); Deepak Hooda 2/16 (2 overs)		Shikhar Dhawan 51 (30); Sunil Narine 3/26 (4 overs)	Eden Gardens, Kolkata; Umpires: K. N. Ananthapadmanabhan (India) and Marais Erasmus (South Africa); Player of the match: Yusuf Pathan (Kolkata Knight Riders)
Sunrisers Hyderabad won the toss and elected to field.				Eden Gardens, Kolkata; Umpires: K. N. Ananthapadmanabhan (India) and Marais Erasmus (South Africa); Player of the match: Yusuf Pathan (Kolkata Knight Riders)

=== Playoff stage ===
==== Eliminator ====
25 May	Sunrisers Hyderabad; 162/8 (20 overs)	v	Kolkata Knight Riders; 140/8 (20 overs)	Sunrisers Hyderabad won by 22 runs
20:00 (D/N); Scorecard	Sunrisers Hyderabad; 162/8 (20 overs)	v	Kolkata Knight Riders; 140/8 (20 overs)	Feroz Shah Kotla, Delhi; Umpires: Marais Erasmus (South Africa) and Chettithody Shamshuddin (India); Player of the match: Moises Henriques (Sunrisers Hyderabad)
20:00 (D/N); Scorecard	Yuvraj Singh 44 (30); Kuldeep Yadav 3/35 (4 overs)		Manish Pandey 36 (28); Bhuvneshwar Kumar 3/19 (4 overs)	Feroz Shah Kotla, Delhi; Umpires: Marais Erasmus (South Africa) and Chettithody Shamshuddin (India); Player of the match: Moises Henriques (Sunrisers Hyderabad)
Kolkata Knight Riders won the toss and elected to field.				Feroz Shah Kotla, Delhi; Umpires: Marais Erasmus (South Africa) and Chettithody Shamshuddin (India); Player of the match: Moises Henriques (Sunrisers Hyderabad)

==== Qualifier 2 ====
27 May	Gujarat Lions; 162/7 (20 overs)	v	Sunrisers Hyderabad; 163/6 (19.2 overs)	Sunrisers Hyderabad won by 4 wickets
20:00 (D/N); Scorecard	Gujarat Lions; 162/7 (20 overs)	v	Sunrisers Hyderabad; 163/6 (19.2 overs)	Feroz Shah Kotla, Delhi; Umpires: Marais Erasmus (South Africa) and C. K. Nandan (India); Player of the match: David Warner (Sunrisers Hyderabad)
20:00 (D/N); Scorecard	Aaron Finch 50 (32); Ben Cutting 2/20 (3 overs)		David Warner 93* (58); Shivil Kaushik 2/22 (4 overs)	Feroz Shah Kotla, Delhi; Umpires: Marais Erasmus (South Africa) and C. K. Nandan (India); Player of the match: David Warner (Sunrisers Hyderabad)
Sunrisers Hyderabad won the toss and elected to field.				Feroz Shah Kotla, Delhi; Umpires: Marais Erasmus (South Africa) and C. K. Nandan (India); Player of the match: David Warner (Sunrisers Hyderabad)

==== Final ====
29 May	Sunrisers Hyderabad; 208/7 (20 overs)	v	Royal Challengers Bangalore; 200/7 (20 overs)	Sunrisers Hyderabad won by 8 runs
20:00 (D/N); Scorecard	Sunrisers Hyderabad; 208/7 (20 overs)	v	Royal Challengers Bangalore; 200/7 (20 overs)	M. Chinnaswamy Stadium, Bangalore; Umpires: Kumar Dharmasena (Sri Lanka) and Bruce Oxenford (Australia); Player of the match: Ben Cutting (Sunrisers Hyederabad)
20:00 (D/N); Scorecard	David Warner 69 (38); Chris Jordan 3/45 (4 overs)		Chris Gayle 76 (38); Ben Cutting 2/35 (4 overs)	M. Chinnaswamy Stadium, Bangalore; Umpires: Kumar Dharmasena (Sri Lanka) and Bruce Oxenford (Australia); Player of the match: Ben Cutting (Sunrisers Hyederabad)
Sunrisers Hyderabad won the toss and elected to bat.; Sunrisers Hyderabad won the 2016 Indian Premier League.; This was the maiden IPL title for Sunrisers Hyderabad.				M. Chinnaswamy Stadium, Bangalore; Umpires: Kumar Dharmasena (Sri Lanka) and Bruce Oxenford (Australia); Player of the match: Ben Cutting (Sunrisers Hyederabad)

== Statistics ==
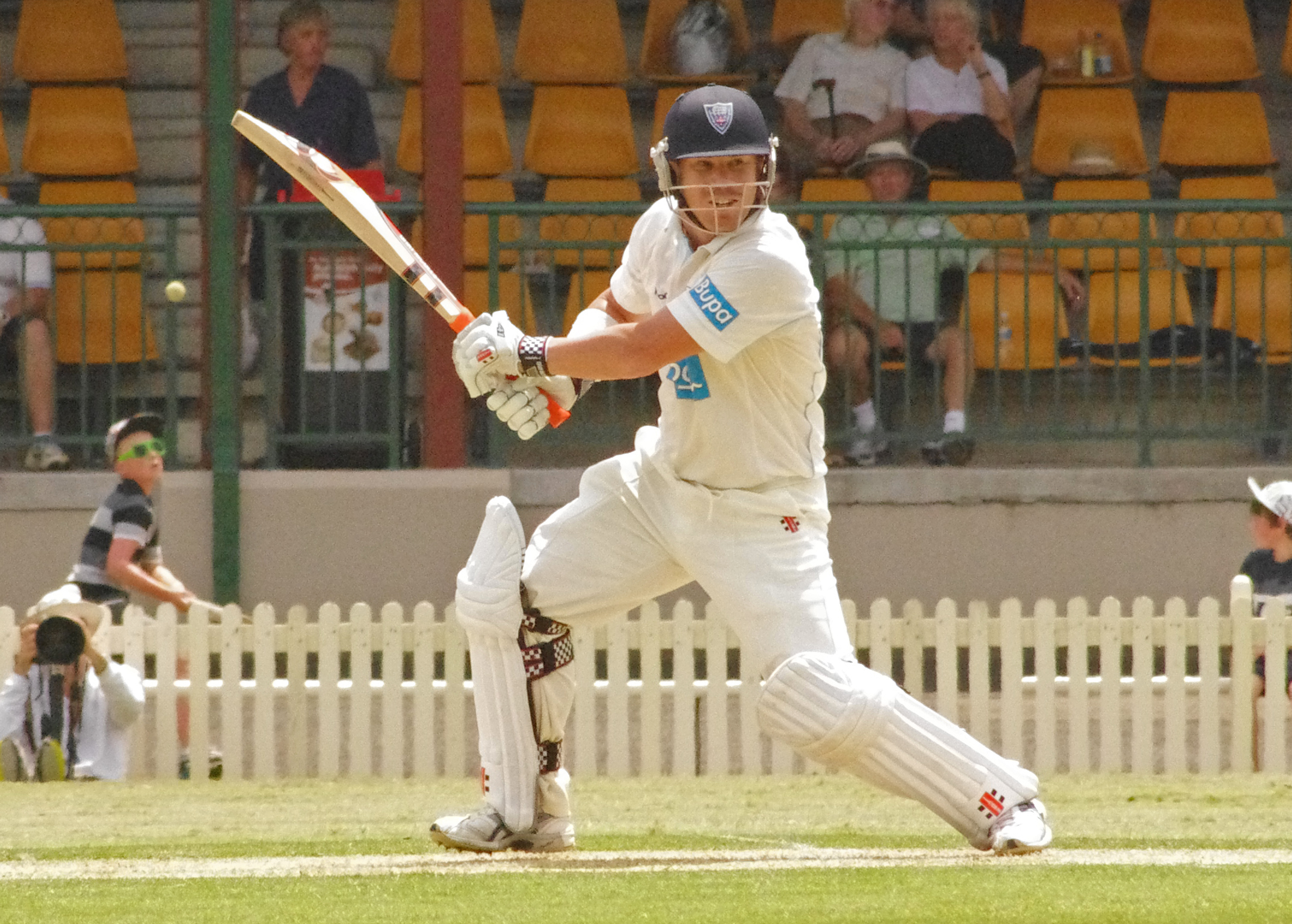
David Warner became highest run-getter for SRH in IPL 2016.

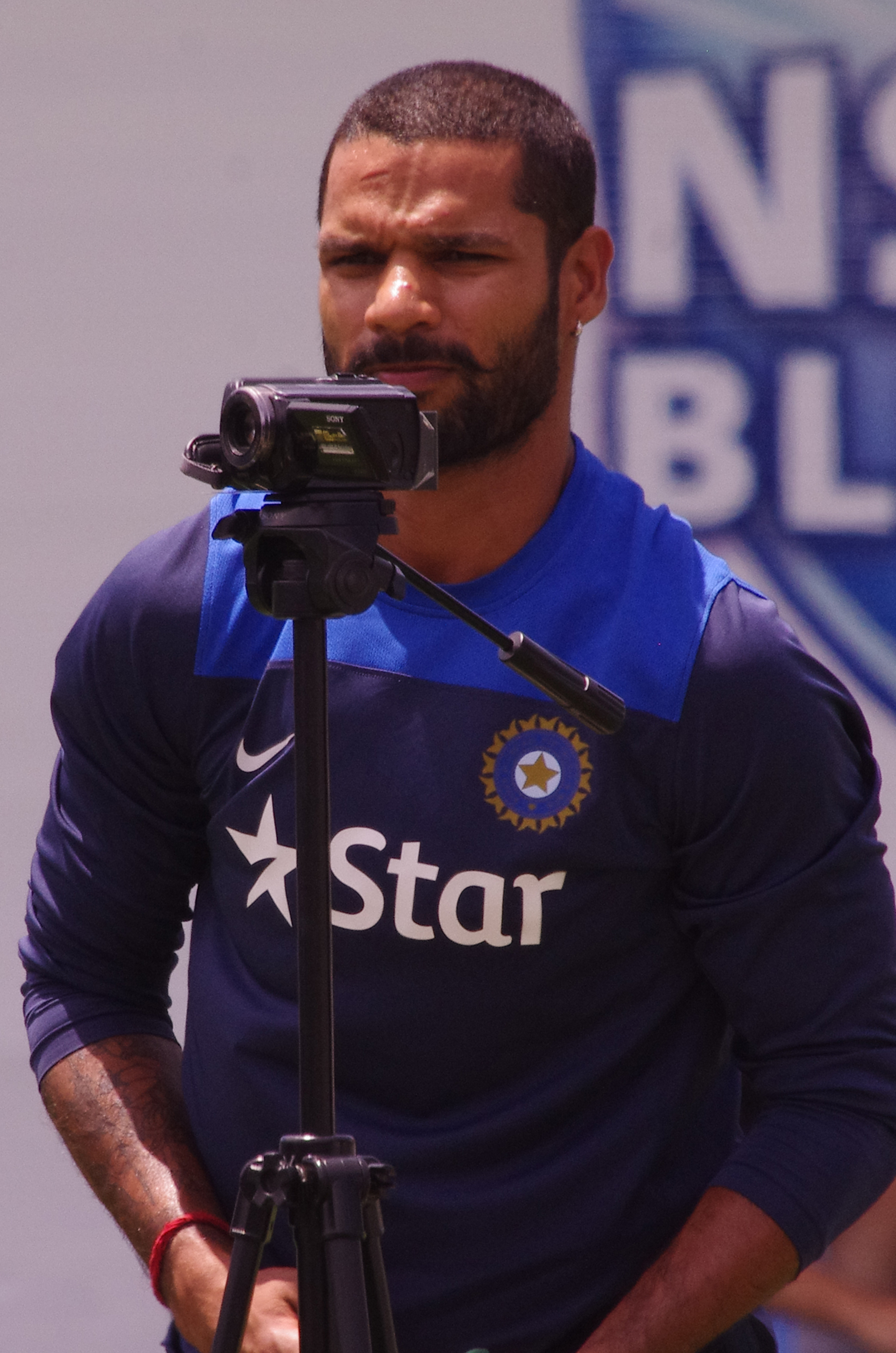
Shikhar Dhawan became second highest run-getter for SRH in IPL 2016.

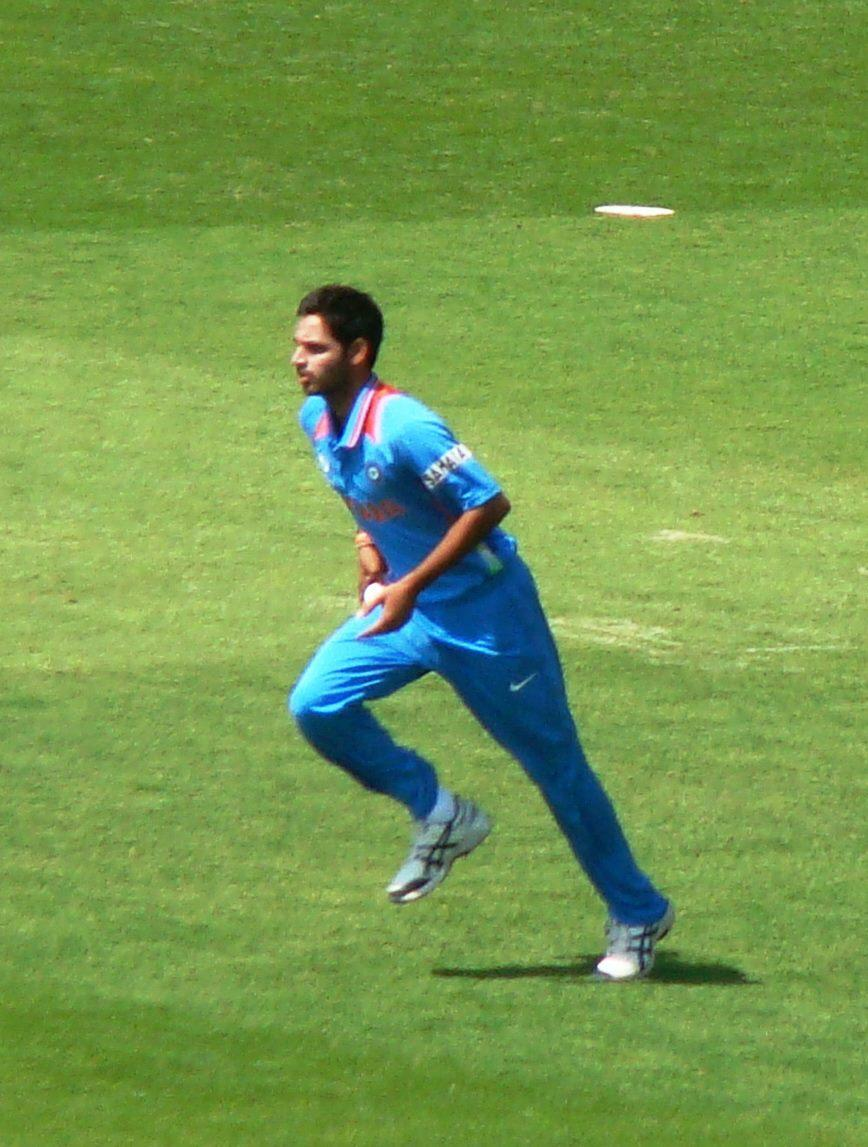
Bhuvneshwar Kumar became highest wicket-taker for SRH winning Purple Cap in IPL 2016.

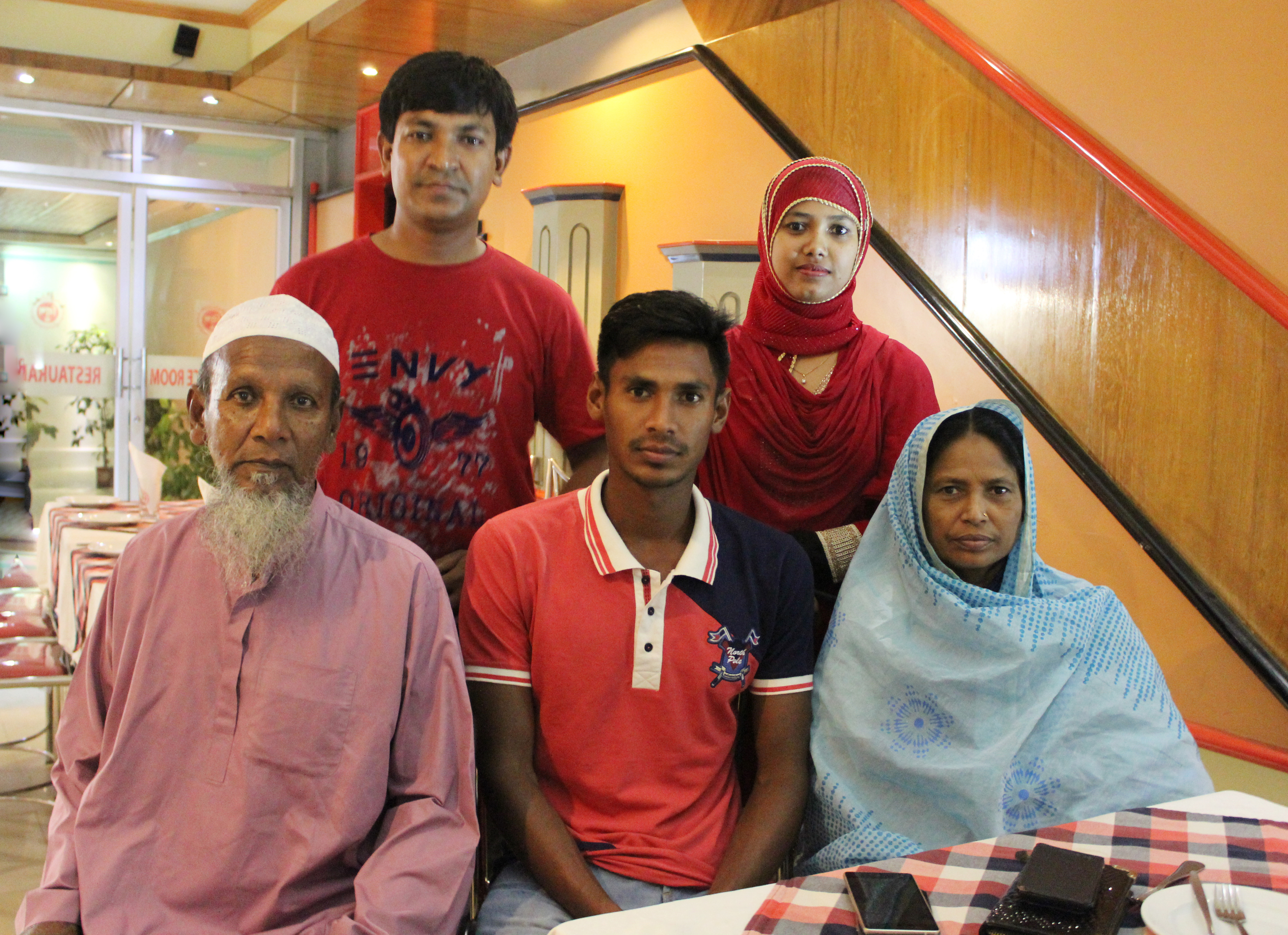
Mustafizur Rahman became second highest wicket-taker for SRH in IPL 2016.

Name	Mat	Runs	HS	Ave	SR	Wkts	BBI	Ave	Eco	Ct	St
Shikhar Dhawan	17	501	82*	38.53	116.78	-	-	-	-	5	0
David Warner	17	848	93*	60.57	151.42	-	-	-	-	4	0
Moisés Henriques	17	182	31*	15.16	115.18	12	2/17	34.58	7.98	11	0
Yuvraj Singh	10	236	44	26.22	131.84	0	-	-	8.43	1	0
Eoin Morgan	7	123	51	24.60	117.14	-	-	-	-	3	0
Kane Williamson	6	124	50	20.66	101.63	0	-	-	7.00	5	0
Deepak Hooda	17	144	34	10.28	119.00	3	2/16	32.33	7.46	3	0
Ben Cutting	4	65	39*	32.50	191.17	5	2/20	16.00	7.16	1	0
Naman Ojha	17	136	37	13.60	98.55	-	-	-	-	18	0
Ashish Reddy	4	47	32	23.50	162.06	1	1/14	39.00	10.17	1	0
Aditya Tare	3	8	8	4.00	53.33	-	-	-	-	1	0
Bipul Sharma	7	51	27*	25.50	204.00	3	1/10	40.33	8.64	2	0
Bhuvneshwar Kumar	17	43	21	7.16	159.25	23	4/29	21.30	7.42	6	0
Barinder Sran	14	4	2*	-	100.00	14	3/28	29.50	8.34	2	0
Karn Sharma	5	36	26*	-	120.00	0	-	-	10.46	0	0
Mustafizur Rahman	16	-	-	-	-	17	3/16	24.76	6.90	2	0
Ashish Nehra	8	1	1*	-	100.00	9	3/15	22.11	7.65	1	0
Trent Boult	1	-	-	-	-	1	1/39	39.00	9.75	1	0

Full Table on ESPNcricinfo

Last updated: 26 Oct 2017

== Awards and achievements ==
=== Awards ===
Man of the Match

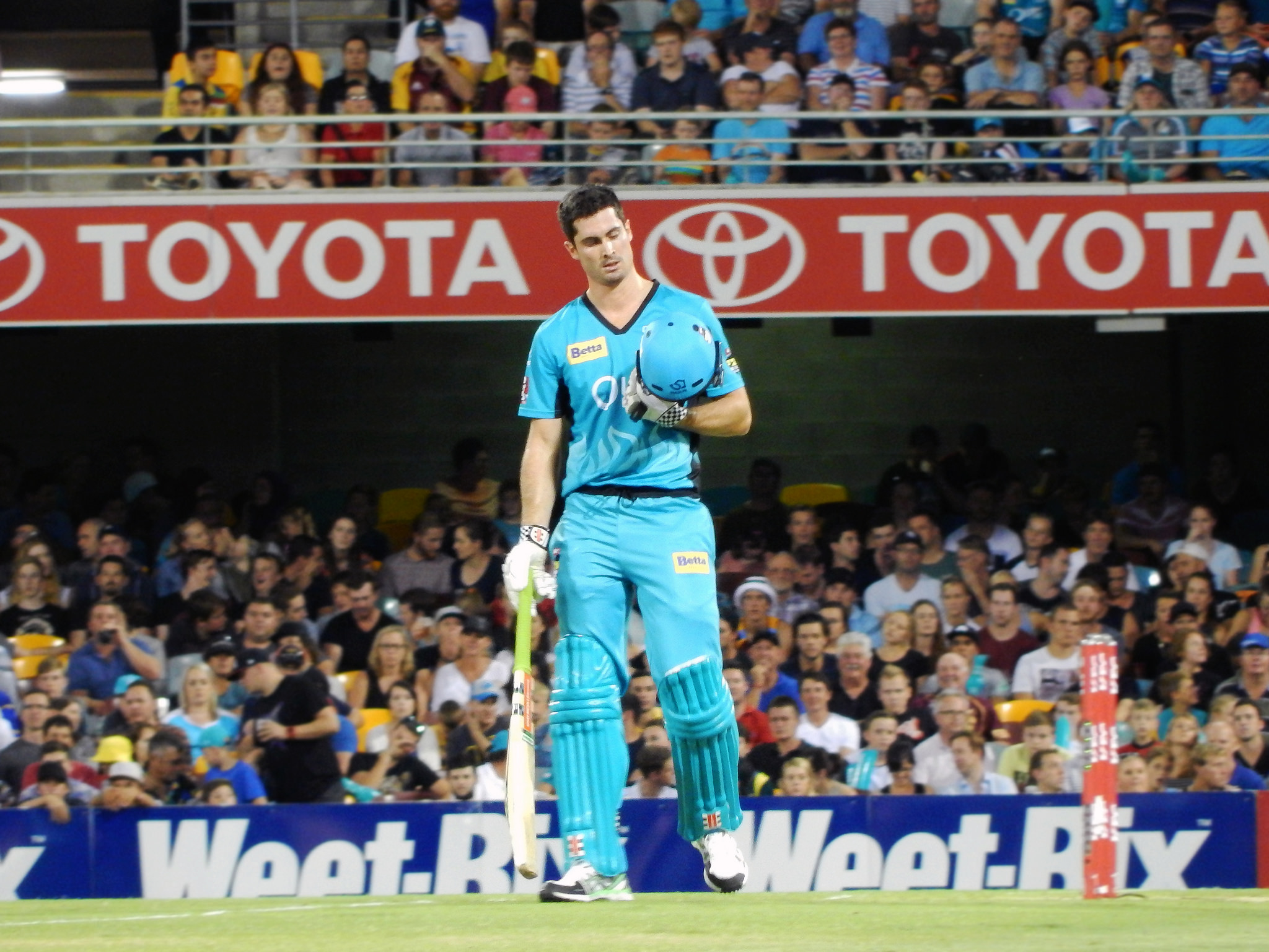
Ben Cutting awarded player of the match in IPL 2016 Final

No.	Date	Player	Opponent	Venue	Result	Contribution
1	18 April 2016	David Warner	Mumbai Indians	Hyderabad	Won by 7 wickets	90*(59)
2	21 April 2016	Bhuvneshwar Kumar	Gujarat Lions	Rajkot	Won by 10 wickets	4/29 (4 Overs)
3	23 April 2016	Mustafizur Rahman	Kings XI Punjab	Hyderabad	Won by 5 wickets	2/9 (4 Overs)
4	30 April 2016	David Warner	Royal Challengers Bangalore	Hyderabad	Won by 15 runs	92(50)
5	6 May 2016	Bhuvneshwar Kumar	Gujarat Lions	Hyderabad	Won by 5 wickets	2/28 (4 Overs)
6	8 May 2016	Ashish Nehra	Mumbai Indians	Visakhapatnam	Won by 85 runs	3/15 (3 Overs)
Play-offs
7	25 May 2016	Moises Henriques	Kolkata Knight Riders (Eliminator)	Delhi	Won by 22 Runs	31(21) & 2/17 (3 Overs)
8	27 May 2016	David Warner	Gujarat Lions (Qualifier 2)	Delhi	Won by 4 Wickets	93*(58)
9	29 May 2016	Ben Cutting	Royal Challengers Bangalore (Final)	Bangalore	Won by 8 Runs	39(15) & 2/35 (4 Overs)

Season Awards

- Champions of the 2016 Indian Premier League
- Winner of 2016 Fair Play Award
- Winner of Purple Cap: Bhuvneshwar Kumar
- Emerging player of the season: Mustafizur Rahman
- Ball of the tournament: Mustafizur Rahman
- Vitara Brezza Glam Shot of the Season: David Warner
Source :

=== Achievements ===
- Biggest six of the tournament : Ben Cutting
- Yes bank maximum : David Warner
- Most Fours scored : David Warner
- Most Dot Balls Bowled : Bhuvneshwar Kumar

== Reaction ==
The 2016 season performances helped the IPL see its brand value jump by 19% to the estimated value of US$4.16 billion. The SunRisers also saw the increase in their brand value by 17% to US$41 million in 2016, according to Duff & Phelps.

== See also ==
- List of Sunrisers Hyderabad records
