= 2016 Royal Challengers Bangalore season =

Indian Premier League cricket team season

Royal Challengers Bangalore
2016 season
- Coach: Daniel Vettori
- Captain: Virat Kohli
- Ground(s): M. Chinnaswamy Stadium, Bangalore
- Indian Premier League: Runners-up
- Most runs: Virat Kohli (973)
- Most wickets: Shane Watson and Yuzvendra Chahal (20)

Royal Challengers Bangalore is a franchise cricket team based in Bangalore, India, which plays in the Indian Premier League. They were one of the eight teams which competed in the 2016 Indian Premier League. They were captained by Virat Kohli and coached by Daniel Vettori.

== Background ==
In March 2016, the team director Vijay Mallya stepped down from his position, but chose to remain with the franchise in the role of chief mentor.

The Royal Challengers wore separate kits for home and away matches for the first time during the 2016 season.

== Squad ==
- Players with international caps before the start of 2016 IPL are listed in **bold**.

No.	Name	Nationality	Birth date	Batting style	Bowling style	Year signed	Salary	Notes
Batsmen
9	Mandeep Singh	India	18 December 1991 (aged 24)	Right-handed	Right-arm medium	2015	Traded player	
11	**KL Rahul**	India	18 April 1992 (aged 23)	Right-handed	Right-arm off break	2016	Traded player	Occasional wicket-keeper
18	**Virat Kohli**	India	5 November 1988 (aged 27)	Right-handed	Right-arm medium	2014	₹12.5 crore (US$1.86 million)	Captain
34	**Travis Head**	Australia	29 December 1993 (aged 22)	Left-handed	Right-arm off break	2016	₹50 lakh (US$74,000)	Overseas
36	Sachin Baby	India	18 December 1988 (aged 27)	Left-handed	Right arm off break	2016	₹10 lakh (US$15,000)	
97	Sarfaraz Khan	India	27 October 1997 (aged 18)	Right-handed	Right-arm off break	2015	₹50 lakh (US$74,000)	
99	**Kedar Jadhav**	India	26 March 1985 (aged 31)	Right-handed	Right-arm off break	2016	Traded player	Occasional wicket-keeper
333	**Chris Gayle**	Jamaica	21 September 1979 (aged 36)	Left-handed	Right-arm off break	2014	₹8.4 crore (US$1.25 million)	Overseas
All-rounders
1	**Parvez Rasool**	India	13 February 1989 (aged 27)	Right-handed	Right-arm off break	2016	Traded player	
33	**Shane Watson**	Australia	17 June 1981 (aged 34)	Right-handed	Right-arm medium-fast	2016	₹9.5 crore (US$1.41 million)	Overseas
96	**David Wiese**	South Africa	18 May 1985 (aged 30)	Right-handed	Right-arm medium-fast	2015	₹2.8 crore (US$420,000)	Overseas
84	**Stuart Binny**	India	3 June 1984 (aged 31)	Right-handed	Right-arm medium	2016	₹2 crore (US$300,000)	
	Akshay Karnewar	India	12 October 1992 (aged 23)	Left-handed	Slow left-arm orthodox Right-arm off break	2016	₹10 lakh (US$15,000)	
	Praveen Dubey	India	1 July 1993 (aged 22)	Right-handed	Right-arm leg break googly	2016	₹35 lakh (US$52,000)	
Wicket-keepers
17	**AB de Villiers**	South Africa	17 February 1984 (aged 32)	Right-handed	Right-arm medium	2014	₹9.5 crore (US$1.41 million)	Overseas
Bowlers
3	Yuzvendra Chahal	India	23 July 1990 (aged 25)	Right-handed	Right-arm leg break googly	2014	₹10 lakh (US$15,000)	
6	**Sreenath Aravind**	India	8 April 1984 (aged 32)	Left-handed	Left-arm medium-fast	2015	₹10 lakh (US$15,000)	
7	**Varun Aaron**	India	29 October 1989 (aged 26)	Right-handed	Right-arm fast	2014	₹2 crore (US$300,000)	
8	**Chris Jordan**	England	4 October 1988 (aged 27)	Right-handed	Right-arm medium-fast	2016	₹1 crore (US$150,000)	Overseas
13	Harshal Patel	India	23 November 1990 (aged 25)	Right-handed	Right-arm medium-fast	2014	₹40 lakh (US$60,000)	
20	**Adam Milne** (Note: ruled out of the season with an injury)	New Zealand	13 April 1992 (aged 23)	Right-handed	Right-arm fast	2015	₹70 lakh (US$104,000)	Overseas
21	Iqbal Abdulla	India	2 December 1989 (aged 26)	Left-handed	Slow left-arm orthodox	2016	₹10 lakh (US$15,000)	
23	Abu Nechim	India	5 November 1988 (aged 27)	Right-handed	Right-arm medium-fast	2014	₹30 lakh (US$45,000)	
47	**Kane Richardson**	Australia	12 February 1991 (aged 25)	Right-handed	Right-arm medium-fast	2016	₹2 crore (US$300,000)	Overseas
56	**Mitchell Starc** (Note: withdrew from the season)	Australia	30 January 1990 (aged 26)	Left-handed	Left-arm fast	2014	₹5 crore (US$740,000)	Overseas
90	Tabraiz Shamsi	South Africa	18 February 1990 (aged 26)	Right-handed	Left-arm unorthodox spin	2016	₹10 lakh (US$15,000)	Overseas
	**Samuel Badree** (Note: ruled out of the season with an injury)	Trinidad and Tobago	9 March 1981 (aged 35)	Right-handed	Right-arm leg break	2016	₹50 lakh (US$74,000)	Overseas
	Vikramjeet Malik	India	9 May 1983 (aged 32)	Right-handed	Right-arm medium-fast	2016	₹20 lakh (US$30,000)	
	Vikas Tokas	India	16 October 1986 (aged 29)	Right-handed	Right-arm medium-fast	2016	₹10 lakh (US$15,000)	

== Season standings ==
Pos	Team	Pld	W	L	NR	Pts	NRR	
1	Gujarat Lions (3)	14	9	5	0	18	−0.374	Advanced to Qualifier 1
2	Royal Challengers Bangalore (RU)	14	8	6	0	16	0.932	Advanced to Qualifier 1
3	Sunrisers Hyderabad (C)	14	8	6	0	16	0.245	Advanced to the Eliminator
4	Kolkata Knight Riders (4)	14	8	6	0	16	0.106	Advanced to the Eliminator
5	Mumbai Indians	14	7	7	0	14	−0.146	
6	Delhi Daredevils	14	7	7	0	14	−0.155	
7	Rising Pune Supergiants	14	5	9	0	10	0.015	
8	Kings XI Punjab	14	4	10	0	8	−0.646	

The four top ranked teams qualified for the playoffs

== Fixtures ==
No.	Date	Opponent	Venue	Result	Man of the match	Scorecard
1	April 12, 2016	Sunrisers Hyderabad	Bangalore	Won by 45 runs	AB de Villiers 82 (42)	Scorecard
2	April 17, 2016	Delhi Daredevils	Bangalore	Lost by 7 wickets		Scorecard
3	April 20, 2016	Mumbai Indians	Mumbai	Lost by 6 wickets		Scorecard
4	April 22, 2016	Rising Pune Supergiant	Pune	Won by 13 runs	AB de Villiers 83 (46)	Scorecard
5	April 24, 2016	Gujarat Lions	Rajkot	Lost by 6 wickets	Virat Kohli 100* (63)	Scorecard
6	April 30, 2016	Sunrisers Hyderabad	Hyderabad	Lost by 15 runs		Scorecard
7	May 2, 2016	Kolkata Knight Riders	Bangalore	Lost by 5 wickets		Scorecard
8	May 7, 2016	Rising Pune Supergiant	Bangalore	Won by 7 wickets	Virat Kohli 108* (58)	Scorecard
9	May 9, 2016	Kings XI Punjab	Mohali	Won by 1 run	Shane Watson 2/22 (4 overs)	Scorecard
10	May 11, 2016	Mumbai Indians	Bangalore	Lost by 6 wickets		Scorecard
11	May 14, 2016	Gujarat Lions	Bangalore	Won by 144 runs	AB de Villiers 129* (52)	Scorecard
12	May 16, 2016	Kolkata Knight Riders	Kolkata	Won by 9 Wickets	Virat Kohli 75* (51)	Scorecard
13	May 18, 2016	Kings XI Punjab	Bangalore	Won by 82 runs (D/L)	Virat Kohli 113 (50)	Scorecard
14	May 22, 2016	Delhi Daredevils	Raipur	Won by 6 Wickets	Virat Kohli 54* (45)	Scorecard
Play-offs
15	May 24, 2016	Gujarat Lions (Qualifier 1)	Bangalore	Won by 4 Wickets	AB de Villiers 79* (47)	Scorecard
16	May 29, 2016	Sunrisers Hyderabad (Final)	Bangalore	Lost by 8 Runs		Scorecard
Overall record: 9–7. Runners-up.
