= 2016 Delhi Daredevils season =

Indian Premier League cricket team season

Delhi Daredevils
2016 season
- Coach: Paddy Upton
- Captain: Zaheer Khan
- Ground(s): Feroz Shah Kotla, Delhi
- IPL: 6th
- Most runs: Quinton de Kock (445)
- Most wickets: Chris Morris (13)

Delhi Daredevils (DD) were a franchise cricket team based in Delhi, India, which played in the Indian Premier League (IPL). They were one of the eight teams to compete in the 2016 Indian Premier League.

== Squad ==
- Players with international caps before the start of 2016 IPL are listed in **bold**.

No.	Name	Nationality	Birth date	Batting style	Bowling style	Year signed	Salary	Notes
Batsmen
14	Mayank Agarwal	India	16 February 1991 (aged 25)	Right-handed		2014	₹1.6 crore (US$240,000)	
21	**JP Duminy**	South Africa	14 April 1984 (aged 31)	Left-handed	Right-arm off break	2014	₹2.2 crore (US$330,000)	Overseas
41	Shreyas Iyer	India	6 December 1994 (aged 21)	Right-handed	Right-arm leg break	2015	₹2.6 crore (US$390,000)	
69	Karun Nair	India	6 December 1991 (aged 24)	Right-handed	Right-arm off break	2016	₹4 crore (US$600,000)	
All-rounders
2	**Chris Morris**	South Africa	30 April 1987 (aged 28)	Right-handed	Right-arm medium-fast	2016	₹7 crore (US$1.04 million)	Overseas
6	**Pawan Negi**	India	6 January 1993 (aged 23)	Left-handed	Slow left-arm orthodox	2016	₹8.5 crore (US$1.26 million)	
19	Jayant Yadav	India	22 January 1990 (aged 26)	Right-handed	Right-arm off break	2014	₹10 lakh (US$15,000)	
26	**Carlos Brathwaite**	Barbados	18 July 1988 (aged 27)	Right-handed	Right-arm medium-fast	2016	₹4.2 crore (US$630,000)	Overseas
	Akhil Herwadkar	India	31 October 1994 (aged 21)	Left-handed	Right-arm off break	2016	₹10 lakh (US$15,000)	
	Mahipal Lomror	India	16 November 1999 (aged 16)	Left-handed	Slow left-arm orthodox	2016	₹10 lakh (US$15,000)	
Wicket-keepers
7	**Sam Billings**	England	15 June 1991 (aged 24)	Right-handed		2016	₹30 lakh (US$45,000)	Overseas
9	**Sanju Samson**	India	11 November 1994 (aged 21)	Right-handed		2016	₹4.2 crore (US$630,000)	
12	**Quinton de Kock**	South Africa	17 December 1992 (aged 23)	Left-handed		2014	₹3.5 crore (US$520,000)	Overseas
777	Rishabh Pant	India	4 October 1997 (aged 18)	Left-handed		2016	₹1.9 crore (US$280,000)	
Bowlers
11	**Mohammed Shami**	India	9 March 1990 (aged 26)	Right-handed	Right-arm medium-fast	2014	₹4.25 crore (US$630,000)	
13	**Nathan Coulter-Nile**	Australia	11 October 1987 (aged 28)	Right-handed	Right-arm fast	2014	₹4.25 crore (US$630,000)	Overseas
18	**Amit Mishra**	India	24 November 1982 (aged 33)	Right-handed	Right-arm leg break	2015	₹3.5 crore (US$520,000)	
28	**Gurinder Sandhu**	Australia	14 June 1993 (aged 22)	Left-handed	Right-arm medium-fast	2015	₹1.7 crore (US$250,000)	Overseas
34	**Zaheer Khan**	India	7 October 1978 (aged 37)	Right-handed	Left-arm medium-fast	2015	₹4 crore (US$600,000)	Captain
88	Shahbaz Nadeem	India	12 August 1989 (aged 26)	Right-handed	Slow left-arm orthodox	2014	₹85 lakh (US$126,000)	
99	**Imran Tahir**	South Africa	27 March 1979 (aged 37)	Right-handed	Right-arm leg break googly	2014	₹1 crore (US$150,000)	Overseas
313	Khaleel Ahmed	India	5 December 1997 (aged 18)	Right-handed	Left-arm medium-fast	2016	₹10 lakh (US$15,000)	
	**Joel Paris** (Note: ruled out of the season with an injury)	Australia	11 December 1992 (aged 23)	Left-handed	Left-arm medium-fast	2016	₹30 lakh (US$45,000)	Overseas
	Pawan Suyal	India	15 October 1989 (aged 26)	Right-handed	Left-arm medium-fast	2016	₹10 lakh (US$15,000)	
	Chama Milind	India	4 September 1994 (aged 21)	Left-handed	Left-arm medium-fast	2016	₹10 lakh (US$15,000)	
	Pratyush Singh	India	4 September 1994 (aged 21)	Right-handed	Right-arm leg break googly	2016	₹10 lakh (US$15,000)	

== Season standings ==
Pos	Team	Pld	W	L	NR	Pts	NRR	
1	Gujarat Lions (3)	14	9	5	0	18	−0.374	Advanced to Qualifier 1
2	Royal Challengers Bangalore (RU)	14	8	6	0	16	0.932	Advanced to Qualifier 1
3	Sunrisers Hyderabad (C)	14	8	6	0	16	0.245	Advanced to the Eliminator
4	Kolkata Knight Riders (4)	14	8	6	0	16	0.106	Advanced to the Eliminator
5	Mumbai Indians	14	7	7	0	14	−0.146	
6	Delhi Daredevils	14	7	7	0	14	−0.155	
7	Rising Pune Supergiants	14	5	9	0	10	0.015	
8	Kings XI Punjab	14	4	10	0	8	−0.646	

The four top ranked teams qualified for the playoffs

== Match log ==
No.	Date	Opponent	Venue	Result	Man of the Match	Scorecard
1	10 April 2016	Kolkata Knight Riders	Kolkata	Lost by 9 wickets		Scorecard
2	15 April 2016	Kings XI Punjab	Delhi	Won by 8 wickets	Amit Mishra - 4/11 (3 Overs)	Scorecard
3	17 April 2016	Royal Challengers Bangalore	Bangalore	Won by 7 wickets	Quinton de Kock 108(51)	Scorecard
4	23 April 2016	Mumbai Indians	Delhi	Won by 10 runs	Sanju Samson 60(48)	Scorecard
5	27 April 2016	Gujarat Lions	Delhi	Lost by 1 run	Chris Morris 82*(32) & 2/35(4 overs)	Scorecard
6	30 April 2016	Kolkata Knight Riders	Delhi	Won by 27 runs	Carlos Brathwaite 34(11) & 3/47 (4 overs)	Scorecard
7	3 May 2016	Gujarat Lions	Rajkot	Won by 8 wickets	Rishabh Pant 69(40)	Scorecard
8	5 May 2016	Rising Pune Supergiant	Delhi	Lost by 7 wickets		Scorecard
9	7 May 2016	Kings XI Punjab	Nagpur	Lost by 9 runs		Scorecard
10	12 May 2016	Sunrisers Hyderabad	Hyderabad	Won by 7 wickets	Chris Morris 1/19 (4 Overs)	Scorecard
11	15 May 2016	Mumbai Indians	Visakhapatnam	Lost by 80 runs		Scorecard
12	17 May 2016	Rising Pune Supergiant	Visakhapatnam	Lost by 19 runs (D/L)		Scorecard
13	20 May 2016	Sunrisers Hyderabad	Raipur	Won by 6 wickets	Karun Nair 83*(59)	Scorecard
14	22 May 2016	Royal Challengers Bangalore	Raipur	Lost by 6 wickets		Scorecard
Overall record: 7–7. Failed to advance.

== Statistics ==
Most runs
Player	Runs
Quinton de Kock	445
Karun Nair	357
Sanju Samson	291

Most wickets
Player	Wickets
Chris Morris	13
Amit Mishra	13
Zaheer Khan	10
