= 2016 Kings XI Punjab season =

Indian Premier League cricket team season

Kings XI Punjab
2016 season
- Coach: Sanjay Bangar
- Captain: David Miller, Murali Vijay
- Ground(s): PCA Stadium, Mohali
- IPL: 8th

Kings XI Punjab (KXIP) are a franchise cricket team based in Mohali, India, which plays in the Indian Premier League (IPL). They were one of the eight teams which competed in the 2016 Indian Premier League.

== Squad ==
- Players with international caps before the start of 2016 IPL are listed in **bold**.

No.	Name	Nationality	Birth date	Batting style	Bowling style	Year signed	Salary	Notes
Batsmen
1	**Hashim Amla**	South Africa	31 March 1983 (aged 33)	Right-handed	Right-arm medium	2014	₹1 crore (US$150,000)	Overseas
8	**Murali Vijay**	India	1 April 1984 (aged 32)	Right-handed	Right-arm off break	2015	₹3 crore (US$450,000)	Captain
9	**Shaun Marsh** (Note: ruled out of the season with an injury)	Australia	9 July 1983 (aged 32)	Left-handed	Slow left-arm orthodox	2014	₹2.2 crore (US$330,000)	Overseas
10	**David Miller**	South Africa	10 June 1989 (aged 26)	Left-handed	Right-arm off break	2014	₹5 crore (US$740,000)	Overseas
16	Nikhil Naik	India	9 November 1994 (aged 21)	Right-handed	Right-arm off break	2015	₹30 lakh (US$45,000)	Occasional wicket-keeper
29	**Gurkeerat Singh**	India	29 June 1990 (aged 25)	Right-handed	Right-arm off break	2014	₹1.3 crore (US$190,000)	Occasional wicket-keeper
36	Manan Vohra	India	18 July 1993 (aged 22)	Right-handed	Right-arm medium	2014	₹35 lakh (US$52,000)	
	Armaan Jaffer	India	25 October 1998 (aged 17)	Right-handed	Right-arm off break	2016	₹10 lakh (US$15,000)	
All-rounders
17	**Marcus Stoinis**	Australia	18 September 1988 (aged 27)	Right-handed	Right-arm medium-fast	2016	₹55 lakh (US$82,000)	Overseas
19	**Rishi Dhawan**	India	19 February 1990 (aged 26)	Right-handed	Right-arm medium-fast	2014	₹3 crore (US$450,000)	
20	**Axar Patel**	India	20 January 1994 (aged 22)	Left-handed	Slow left-arm orthodox	2014	₹75 lakh (US$112,000)	
28	**Farhaan Behardien**	South Africa	9 October 1983 (aged 32)	Right-handed	Right-arm medium-fast	2016	₹30 lakh (US$45,000)	Overseas
32	**Glenn Maxwell**	Australia	14 October 1988 (aged 27)	Right-handed	Right-arm off break	2014	₹6 crore (US$890,000)	Overseas
Wicket-keepers
6	**Wriddhiman Saha**	India	24 October 1984 (aged 31)	Right-handed		2014	₹2.2 crore (US$330,000)	
Bowlers
5	Anureet Singh	India	2 March 1988 (aged 28)	Right-handed	Right-arm medium-fast	2014	₹20 lakh (US$30,000)	
14	Swapnil Singh	India	22 January 1991 (aged 25)	Right-handed	Slow left-arm orthodox	2016	₹10 lakh (US$15,000)	
18	**Mohit Sharma**	India	18 September 1988 (aged 27)	Right-handed	Right-arm medium-fast	2016	₹6.5 crore (US$970,000)	
21	Pardeep Sahu	India	21 August 1985 (aged 30)	Right-handed	Right-arm leg break googly	2016	₹10 lakh (US$15,000)	
25	**Mitchell Johnson**	Australia	2 November 1981 (aged 34)	Left-handed	Left-arm fast	2014	₹6.5 crore (US$970,000)	Overseas
28	Shardul Thakur	India	16 October 1991 (aged 24)	Right-handed	Right-arm medium-fast	2014	₹20 lakh (US$30,000)	
66	**Sandeep Sharma**	India	18 May 1993 (aged 22)	Right-handed	Right-arm medium-fast	2014	₹85 lakh (US$126,000)	
87	**Kyle Abbott**	South Africa	18 June 1987 (aged 28)	Right-handed	Right-arm medium-fast	2016	₹2.1 crore (US$310,000)	Overseas
94	KC Cariappa	India	13 April 1994 (aged 21)	Right-handed	Right-arm leg break	2016	₹80 lakh (US$119,000)	

== Season standings ==
Pos	Team	Pld	W	L	NR	Pts	NRR	
1	Gujarat Lions (3)	14	9	5	0	18	−0.374	Advanced to Qualifier 1
2	Royal Challengers Bangalore (RU)	14	8	6	0	16	0.932	Advanced to Qualifier 1
3	Sunrisers Hyderabad (C)	14	8	6	0	16	0.245	Advanced to the Eliminator
4	Kolkata Knight Riders (4)	14	8	6	0	16	0.106	Advanced to the Eliminator
5	Mumbai Indians	14	7	7	0	14	−0.146	
6	Delhi Daredevils	14	7	7	0	14	−0.155	
7	Rising Pune Supergiants	14	5	9	0	10	0.015	
8	Kings XI Punjab	14	4	10	0	8	−0.646	

The four top ranked teams qualified for the playoffs

=== Match log ===
No.	Date	Opponent	Venue	Result	Scorecard
1	April 11, 2016	Gujarat Lions	Mohali	Lost by 5 wickets	Scorecard
2	April 15, 2016	Delhi Daredevils	Delhi	Lost by 8 wickets	Scorecard
3	April 17, 2016	Rising Pune Supergiants	Mohali	Won by 6 wickets	Scorecard
4	April 19, 2016	Kolkata Knight Riders	Mohali	Lost by 6 wickets	Scorecard
5	April 23, 2016	Sunrisers Hyderabad	Hyderabad	Lost by 5 wickets	Scorecard
6	April 25, 2016	Mumbai Indians	Mohali	Lost by 25 runs	Scorecard
7	May 1, 2016	Gujarat Lions	Rajkot	Won by 23 runs	Scorecard
8	May 4, 2016	Kolkata Knight Riders	Kolkata	Lost by 7 runs	Scorecard
9	May 7, 2016	Delhi Daredevils	Mohali	Won by 9 runs	Scorecard
10	May 9, 2016	Royal Challengers Bangalore	Mohali	Lost by 1 run	Scorecard
11	May 13, 2016	Mumbai Indians	Visakhapatnam	Won by 7 wickets	Scorecard
12	May 15, 2016	Sunrisers Hyderabad	Mohali	Lost by 7 wickets	Scorecard
13	May 18, 2016	Royal Challengers Bangalore	Bengaluru	Lost by 82 runs	Scorecard
14	May 21, 2016	Rising Pune Supergiants	Visakhapatnam	Lost by 4 wickets	Scorecard
Overall record: 4–10. Failed to advance.
