= 2016 Kolkata Knight Riders season =

Indian Premier League cricket team season

Kolkata Knight Riders
2016 season
- Coach: Jacques Kallis
- Captain: Gautam Gambhir
- Ground(s): Eden Gardens, Kolkata
- IPL: 4th
- Most runs: Gautam Gambhir (501)
- Most wickets: Andre Russell (15)

Kolkata Knight Riders (KKR) are a franchise cricket team based in Kolkata, India, which plays in the Indian Premier League (IPL). They are one of the eight teams that competed in the 2016 Indian Premier League. They were captained by Gautam Gambhir, and had new coaching staff for the season. Jacques Kallis was head coach in the place of Trevor Bayliss, while Wasim Akram became the new bowling coach. The KKR were placed fourth at the end of the season.

== Squad ==
- Players with international caps before the start of 2016 IPL are listed in **bold**.

No.	Name	Nationality	Birth date	Batting style	Bowling style	Year signed	Salary	Notes
Batsmen
1	**Manish Pandey**	India	10 September 1989 (aged 26)	Right-handed	Right-arm off break	2014	₹1.7 crore (US$250,000)	
10	**Robin Uthappa**	India	11 September 1985 (aged 30)	Right-handed	Right-arm medium	2014	₹5 crore (US$744,099.66)	Occasional wicket-keeper
23	**Gautam Gambhir**	India	14 October 1981 (aged 34)	Left-handed	Right-arm leg break	2014	₹10 crore (US$1.49 million)	Captain
50	**Chris Lynn**	Australia	10 April 1990 (aged 25)	Right-handed	Slow left-arm orthodox	2014	₹1.3 crore (US$190,000)	Overseas
82	**Colin Munro**	New Zealand	11 March 1987 (aged 29)	Left-handed	Right-arm medium	2016	₹30 lakh (US$45,000)	Overseas
212	Suryakumar Yadav	India	14 September 1990 (aged 25)	Right-handed	Right-arm medium	2014	₹70 lakh (US$104,000)	Vice-captain
All-rounders
7	Rajagopal Sathish	India	14 January 1981 (aged 35)	Right-handed	Right-arm medium	2016	₹20 lakh (US$30,000)	
9	Manan Sharma	India	19 March 1991 (aged 25)	Left-handed	Slow left-arm orthodox	2016	₹10 lakh (US$15,000)	
12	**Andre Russell**	Jamaica	29 April 1988 (aged 27)	Right-handed	Right-arm medium-fast	2014	₹60 lakh (US$89,000)	Overseas
24	**Yusuf Pathan**	India	17 November 1982 (aged 33)	Right-handed	Right-arm off break	2014	₹3.25 crore (US$480,000)	
41	**John Hastings** (Note: ruled out of the season with an injury)	Australia	4 November 1985 (aged 30)	Right-handed	Right-arm medium-fast	2016	₹1.3 crore (US$190,000)	Overseas
75	**Shakib Al Hasan**	Bangladesh	24 March 1987 (aged 29)	Left-handed	Slow left-arm orthodox	2014	₹2.8 crore (US$420,000)	Overseas
98	**Jason Holder**	Barbados	5 November 1991 (aged 24)	Right-handed	Right-arm medium-fast	2016	₹70 lakh (US$104,000)	Overseas
Wicket-keepers
27	Sheldon Jackson	India	27 September 1986 (aged 29)	Right-handed		2015	₹15 lakh (US$22,000)	
Bowlers
3	Ankit Rajpoot	India	4 December 1993 (aged 22)	Right-handed	Right-arm medium-fast	2016	₹1.5 crore (US$220,000)	
18	Kuldeep Yadav	India	14 December 1994 (aged 21)	Left-handed	Left-arm unorthodox spin	2014	₹40 lakh (US$60,000)	
19	**Umesh Yadav**	India	25 October 1987 (aged 28)	Right-handed	Right-arm fast	2014	₹2.6 crore (US$390,000)	
21	**Piyush Chawla**	India	24 December 1988 (aged 27)	Left-handed	Right-arm leg break	2014	₹4.25 crore (US$630,000)	
31	**Brad Hogg**	Australia	6 February 1971 (aged 45)	Left-handed	Left-arm unorthodox spin	2015	₹50 lakh (US$74,000)	Overseas
32	**Shaun Tait**	Australia	22 February 1983 (aged 33)	Right-handed	Right-arm fast	2016	₹1.5 crore (US$220,000)	Overseas
65	**Morne Morkel**	South Africa	6 October 1984 (aged 31)	Left-handed	Right-arm fast	2014	₹2.8 crore (US$420,000)	Overseas
74	**Sunil Narine**	Trinidad and Tobago	26 May 1988 (aged 27)	Left-handed	Right-arm off break	2014	₹8 crore (US$1.19 million)	Overseas
77	**Jaydev Unadkat**	India	18 October 1992 (aged 23)	Right-handed	Left-arm medium-fast	2016	₹1.6 crore (US$240,000)	

== Indian Premier League ==
=== Season standings ===
Pos	Team	Pld	W	L	NR	Pts	NRR	
1	Gujarat Lions (3)	14	9	5	0	18	−0.374	Advanced to Qualifier 1
2	Royal Challengers Bangalore (RU)	14	8	6	0	16	0.932	Advanced to Qualifier 1
3	Sunrisers Hyderabad (C)	14	8	6	0	16	0.245	Advanced to the Eliminator
4	Kolkata Knight Riders (4)	14	8	6	0	16	0.106	Advanced to the Eliminator
5	Mumbai Indians	14	7	7	0	14	−0.146	
6	Delhi Daredevils	14	7	7	0	14	−0.155	
7	Rising Pune Supergiants	14	5	9	0	10	0.015	
8	Kings XI Punjab	14	4	10	0	8	−0.646	

The four top ranked teams qualified for the playoffs

=== Match log ===
No.	Date	Opponent	Venue	Result	Scorecard
1	April 10, 2016	Delhi Daredevils	Kolkata	Won by 9 wickets, MoM - Andre Russell 3/24 (3 Overs)	Scorecard
2	April 13, 2016	Mumbai Indians	Kolkata	Lost by 6 wickets	Scorecard
3	April 16, 2016	Sunrisers Hyderabad	Hyderabad	Won by 8 wickets, MoM - Gautam Gambhir 90*(60)	Scorecard
4	April 19, 2016	Kings XI Punjab	Mohali	Won by 6 wickets, MoM - Robin Uthappa 53(28)	Scorecard
5	April 24, 2016	Rising Pune Supergiant	Pune	Won by 2 wickets, MoM - Suryakumar Yadav 60(49)	Scorecard
6	April 28, 2016	Mumbai Indians	Mumbai	Lost by 6 wickets	Scorecard
7	April 30, 2016	Delhi Daredevils	Delhi	Lost by 27 runs	Scorecard
8	May 2, 2016	Royal Challengers Bangalore	Bengaluru	Won by 5 wickets, MoM - Andre Russell 39(24) & 1/24 (4 Overs)	Scorecard
9	May 4, 2016	Kings XI Punjab	Kolkata	Won by 7 runs, MoM - Andre Russell 16(10) & 4/20 (4 Overs)	Scorecard
10	May 8, 2016	Gujarat Lions	Kolkata	Lost by 5 wickets	Scorecard
11	May 14, 2016	Rising Pune Supergiant	Kolkata	Won by 8 wickets (D/L), MoM - Yusuf Pathan 37*(18)	Scorecard
12	May 16, 2016	Royal Challengers Bangalore	Kolkata	Lost by 9 wickets	Scorecard
13	May 19, 2016	Gujarat Lions	Kanpur	Lost by 6 wickets	Scorecard
14	May 22, 2016	Sunrisers Hyderabad	Kolkata	Won by 22 runs, MoM - Yusuf Pathan 52*(34)	Scorecard
Play-offs
15	25 May 2016	Sunrisers Hyderabad (Eliminator)	Delhi	Lost by 22 runs	Scorecard
Overall record: 8–7. Eliminated in the first stage of the playoffs.
