= 2016 Rising Pune Supergiant season =

Indian franchise cricket team

Rising Pune Supergiants
2016 Indian Premier League season
- Coach: Stephen Fleming
- Captain: MS Dhoni
- Ground(s): Maharashtra Cricket Association Stadium, Pune (Capacity: 42,000); Dr. Y.S. Rajasekhara Reddy ACA-VDCA Cricket Stadium, Visakhapatnam
- IPL: 7th

Rising Pune Supergiants (RPS) was a franchise cricket team based in Pune, Maharashtra, India, which played in the Indian Premier League (IPL) in 2016 and 2017. They were one of eight teams that competed in the 2016 Indian Premier League and were captained by Mahendra Singh Dhoni. This was their first season playing in the IPL.

== Draft ==
Following the two-year suspension of Chennai Super Kings and Rajasthan Royals, two new franchises, Rising Pune Supergiants and Gujarat Lions, were established. These two franchises were allowed to draft a maximum of five players each from the Chennai and Rajasthan squads. The draft took place on 15 December 2015 and the following players were bought:

Player	Salary
Mahendra Singh Dhoni	₹12.5 crore (US$1.86 million)
Ajinkya Rahane	₹8 crore (US$1.19 million)
Ravichandran Ashwin	₹7.5 crore (US$1.12 million)
Steve Smith	₹4 crore (US$600,000)
Faf du Plessis	₹4.75 crore (US$710,000)

== Players auction ==
The player auction for the 2016 Indian Premier League was held in Bangalore on 6 February 2016. The team bought 20 players in the auction.

== Standings ==
Pos	Team	Pld	W	L	NR	Pts	NRR	
1	Gujarat Lions (3)	14	9	5	0	18	−0.374	Advanced to Qualifier 1
2	Royal Challengers Bangalore (RU)	14	8	6	0	16	0.932	Advanced to Qualifier 1
3	Sunrisers Hyderabad (C)	14	8	6	0	16	0.245	Advanced to the Eliminator
4	Kolkata Knight Riders (4)	14	8	6	0	16	0.106	Advanced to the Eliminator
5	Mumbai Indians	14	7	7	0	14	−0.146	
6	Delhi Daredevils	14	7	7	0	14	−0.155	
7	Rising Pune Supergiants	14	5	9	0	10	0.015	
8	Kings XI Punjab	14	4	10	0	8	−0.646	

The four top ranked teams qualified for the playoffs

== Squad ==
- Players with international caps are listed in **bold**.

No.	Name	Nationality	Birth date	Batting style	Bowling style	Salary	Notes
Batsmen
3	**Ajinkya Rahane**	India	5 June 1988	Right-handed	Right-arm medium	₹8 crore (US$1.19 million)	
10	**George Bailey**	Australia	7 September 1982	Right-handed	Right-arm medium	₹1 crore (US$150,000)	Overseas
13	**Faf du Plessis**	South Africa	13 July 1984	Right-handed	Right-arm leg break	₹4.75 crore (US$710,000)	Overseas. Withdrew from the tournament
23	**Saurabh Tiwary**	India	30 December 1989	Left-handed	Right-arm off break	Traded player	
24	**Kevin Pietersen**	England	27 June 1980	Right-handed	Right-arm off break	₹3.5 crore (US$520,000)	Overseas. Withdrew from the tournament
49	**Steve Smith**	Australia	2 June 1989	Right-handed	Right-arm leg break	₹4 crore (US$600,000)	Overseas. Withdrew from the tournament
100	**Usman Khawaja**	Australia	18 December 1986	Left-handed	Right-arm medium	₹1 crore (US$150,000)	Overseas
All-rounders
5	Baba Aparajith	India	8 July 1994	Right-handed	Right-arm off break	₹10 lakh (US$15,000)	
16	**Thisara Perera**	Sri Lanka	3 April 1989	Left-handed	Right-arm medium-fast	₹1 crore (US$150,000)	Overseas
18	Ankit Sharma	India	20 April 1991	Left-handed	Slow left-arm orthodox	₹10 lakh (US$15,000)	
25	**Mitchell Marsh**	Australia	20 October 1991	Right-handed	Right-arm medium-fast	₹4.8 crore (US$710,000)	Overseas; Withdrawn Player
28	**Irfan Pathan**	India	27 October 1984	Left-handed	Left-arm medium-fast	₹1 crore (US$150,000)	
29	Rajat Bhatia	India	22 October 1979	Right-handed	Right-arm medium	₹60 lakh (US$89,000)	
81	**Albie Morkel**	South Africa	10 June 1981	Left-handed	Right-arm medium-fast	Traded player	Overseas
Wicket-keepers
7	**Mahendra Singh Dhoni**	India	7 July 1981	Right-handed	Right-arm medium	₹12.5 crore (US$1.86 million)	Captain
54	Peter Handscomb	Australia	26 April 1991	Right-handed		₹30 lakh (US$45,000)	Overseas
55	Ankush Bains	India	16 December 1995	Right-handed		₹10 lakh (US$15,000)	
Bowlers
1	**Ishant Sharma**	India	2 September 1988	Right-handed	Right-arm fast-medium	₹3.8 crore (US$570,000)	
9	**R. P. Singh**	India	6 December 1985	Right-handed	Left-arm fast-medium	₹30 lakh (US$45,000)	
11	**Ashok Dinda**	India	25 March 1984	Right-handed	Right-arm medium-fast	₹50 lakh (US$74,000)	
26	**Scott Boland**	Australia	11 April 1989	Right-handed	Right-arm fast-medium	₹50 lakh (US$74,000)	Overseas
45	Deepak Chahar	India	7 August 1992	Right-handed	Right-arm medium-fast	₹10 lakh (US$15,000)	
63	**Adam Zampa**	Australia	31 March 1992	Right-handed	Right-arm leg break googly	₹30 lakh (US$45,000)	Overseas
89	Murugan Ashwin	India	8 September 1990	Right-handed	Right-arm leg break googly	₹4.5 crore (US$670,000)	
99	**Ravichandran Ashwin**	India	17 September 1986	Right-handed	Right-arm off break	₹7.5 crore (US$1.12 million)	
56	Ishwar Pandey	India	15 August 1989	Right-handed	Right-arm medium-fast	₹20 lakh (US$30,000)	
57	Jaskaran Singh	India	4 September 1989	Right-handed	Right-arm medium-fast	₹10 lakh (US$15,000)	

== Results ==
No.	Date	Opponent	Venue	Result	Man of the Match	Scorecard
1	9 April 2016	Mumbai Indians	Mumbai	Won by 9 wickets	Ajinkya Rahane 66*(42)	Scorecard
2	14 April 2016	Gujarat Lions	Rajkot	Lost by 7 wickets		Scorecard
3	17 April 2016	Kings XI Punjab	Mohali	Lost by 6 wickets		Scorecard
4	22 April 2016	Royal Challengers Bangalore	Pune	Lost by 13 runs		Scorecard
5	24 April 2016	Kolkata Knight Riders	Pune	Lost by 2 wickets		Scorecard
6	26 April 2016	Sunrisers Hyderabad	Hyderabad	Won by 34 runs (D/L)	Ashok Dinda 3/23 (4 overs)	Scorecard
7	29 April 2016	Gujarat Lions	Pune	Lost by 3 wickets		Scorecard
8	1 May 2016	Mumbai Indians	Pune	Lost by 8 wickets		Scorecard
9	5 May 2016	Delhi Daredevils	Delhi	Won by 7 wickets	Ajinkya Rahane 63* (48)	Scorecard
10	7 May 2016	Royal Challengers Bangalore	Bangalore	Lost by 7 wickets		Scorecard
11	10 May 2016	Sunrisers Hyderabad	Visakhapatnam	Lost by 4 runs	Adam Zampa 6/19 (4 overs)	Scorecard
12	14 May 2016	Kolkata Knight Riders	Kolkata	Lost by 8 wickets (D/L)		Scorecard
13	17 May 2016	Delhi Daredevils	Visakhapatnam	Won by 19 Runs (D/L)	Ashok Dinda 3/20 (4 overs)	Scorecard
14	21 May 2016	Kings XI Punjab	Visakhapatnam	Won by 4 Wickets	MS Dhoni 64*(32)	Scorecard
Overall record of 5–9. Failed to make the playoffs; ended 7th out of 8
