= Gujarat Lion =

Gujarat Lion can refer to:

- Asiatic lion, a population of lions (Panthera leo leo) found in the Indian state of Gujarat
- Gujarat Lions, a former franchise cricket team that represented the Indian state of Gujarat in the Indian Premier League (IPL)
