= 2016 Mumbai Indians season =

Indian Premier League cricket team season

Mumbai Indians
2016 season
- Coach: Ricky Ponting
- Captain: Rohit Sharma
- Ground(s): Wankhede Stadium, Mumbai; Dr. Y.S. Rajasekhara Reddy ACA-VDCA Cricket Stadium, Visakhapatnam
- IPL: league stage (5)

Mumbai Indians (MI) are a franchise cricket team based in Mumbai, India, which plays in the Indian Premier League (IPL). Captained by Rohit Sharma, they were one of the eight teams that competed in the 2016 Indian Premier League.

== Season standings ==
Pos	Team	Pld	W	L	NR	Pts	NRR	
1	Gujarat Lions (3)	14	9	5	0	18	−0.374	Advanced to Qualifier 1
2	Royal Challengers Bangalore (RU)	14	8	6	0	16	0.932	Advanced to Qualifier 1
3	Sunrisers Hyderabad (C)	14	8	6	0	16	0.245	Advanced to the Eliminator
4	Kolkata Knight Riders (4)	14	8	6	0	16	0.106	Advanced to the Eliminator
5	Mumbai Indians	14	7	7	0	14	−0.146	
6	Delhi Daredevils	14	7	7	0	14	−0.155	
7	Rising Pune Supergiants	14	5	9	0	10	0.015	
8	Kings XI Punjab	14	4	10	0	8	−0.646	

The four top ranked teams qualified for the playoffs

== Squad ==
- Players with international caps before the start of 2016 IPL are listed in **bold**.

No.	Name	Nationality	Birth date	Batting style	Bowling style	Year signed	Salary	Notes
Batsmen
5	**Aaron Finch** (Note: ruled out of the season with an injury)	Australia	17 November 1986 (aged 28)	Right-handed	Left-arm orthodox	2015	₹3.2 crore (US$480,000)	Overseas
7	Siddhesh Lad	India	23 May 1992 (aged 22)	Right-handed	Right arm off break	2015	₹10 lakh (US$15,000)	
9	**Ambati Rayudu**	India	23 September 1985 (aged 29)	Right-handed	Right-arm off break	2014	₹4 crore (US$600,000)	Occasional wicket-keeper
15	Unmukt Chand	India	26 March 1993 (aged 22)	Right-handed	Right arm off break	2015	Traded player	
45	**Rohit Sharma**	India	30 April 1987 (aged 27)	Right-handed	Right-arm off break	2014	₹12.5 crore (US$1.86 million)	Captain
54	**Lendl Simmons**	Trinidad and Tobago	25 January 1985 (aged 30)	Right-handed	Right-arm medium	2014	₹90 lakh (US$130,000)	Overseas
	Aiden Blizzard	Australia	27 June 1984 (aged 30)	Left-handed	Left-arm medium	2015	₹30 lakh (US$45,000)	Overseas
	**Colin Munro**	New Zealand	11 March 1987 (aged 28)	Left-handed	Right-arm medium-fast	2015	Replacement signing	Overseas
	**Alex Hales**	England	3 January 1989 (aged 26)	Right-handed	Right-arm medium	2015	Replacement signing	Overseas
	Nitish Rana	India	27 December 1993 (aged 21)	Left-handed	Right arm off break	2015	₹10 lakh (US$15,000)	
All-rounders
19	Shreyas Gopal	India	4 September 1993 (aged 21)	Right-handed	Right-arm leg break	2014	₹10 lakh (US$15,000)	
55	**Kieron Pollard**	Trinidad and Tobago	12 May 1987 (aged 27)	Right-handed	Right-arm medium-fast	2014	₹7.5 crore (US$1.12 million)	Overseas/Vice-captain
78	**Corey Anderson** (Note: ruled out of the season with an injury)	New Zealand	13 December 1990 (aged 24)	Left-handed	Left-arm medium-fast	2014	₹4.5 crore (US$670,000)	Overseas
228	Hardik Pandya	India	11 October 1993 (aged 21)	Right-handed	Right-arm medium-fast	2015	₹10 lakh (US$15,000)	
Wicket-keepers
27	Aditya Tare	India	7 November 1987 (aged 27)	Right-handed		2014	₹1.6 crore (US$240,000)	
72	**Parthiv Patel**	India	9 March 1985 (aged 30)	Left-handed		2015	Traded player	
Bowlers
3	**Harbhajan Singh**	India	3 July 1980 (aged 34)	Right-handed	Right-arm off break	2014	₹9.5 crore (US$1.41 million)	
8	**Josh Hazlewood** (Note: withdrew citing rest before international cricket)	Australia	8 January 1991 (aged 24)	Left-handed	Right-arm fast-medium	2014	₹50 lakh (US$74,000)	Overseas
12	Jasprit Bumrah	India	6 December 1993 (aged 21)	Right-handed	Right-arm medium-fast	2014	₹1.2 crore (US$180,000)	
16	Jagadeesha Suchith	India	16 January 1994 (aged 21)	Left-handed	Slow left-arm orthodox	2015	₹10 lakh (US$15,000)	
23	**Vinay Kumar**	India	12 February 1984 (aged 31)	Right-handed	Right-arm medium-fast	2015	Traded player	
30	**Pragyan Ojha**	India	9 March 1985 (aged 30)	Left-handed	Slow left-arm orthodox	2015	₹50 lakh (US$74,000)	
33	Pawan Suyal	India	15 October 1989 (aged 25)	Right-handed	Left-arm medium-fast	2014	₹10 lakh (US$15,000)	
81	**Mitchell McClenaghan**	New Zealand	11 June 1986 (aged 28)	Left-handed	Left-arm fast-medium	2015	₹30 lakh (US$45,000)	Overseas
90	**Marchant de Lange**	South Africa	13 October 1990 (aged 24)	Right-handed	Right-arm fast	2014	₹30 lakh (US$45,000)	Overseas
99	**Lasith Malinga**	Sri Lanka	28 August 1983 (aged 31)	Right-handed	Right-arm fast	2014	₹5.5 crore (US$820,000)	Overseas
	**Abhimanyu Mithun**	India	25 October 1989 (aged 25)	Right-handed	Right-arm fast-medium	2015	₹30 lakh (US$45,000)	
	Akshay Wakhare	India	3 October 1985 (aged 29)	Right-handed	Right arm off break	2015	₹10 lakh (US$15,000)	
	**Ben Hilfenhaus**	Australia	15 March 1983 (aged 32)	Right-handed	Right-arm fast-medium	2015	Replacement signing	Overseas
