= Shadab Jakati =

Indian cricketer (born 1980)

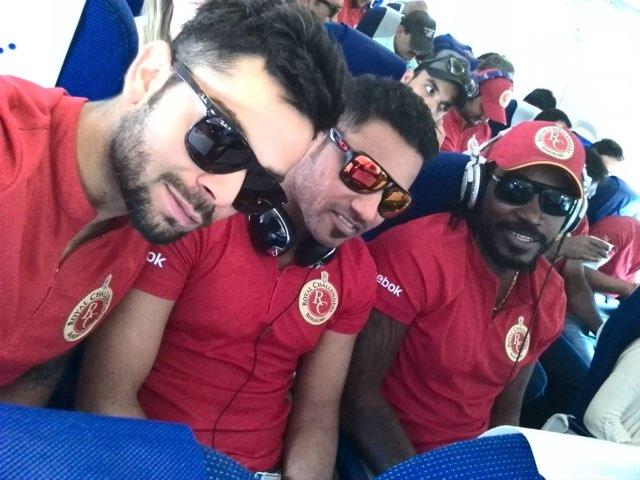
- Jakati (centre) in 2016

Personal information
- Full name: Shadab Bashir Jakati
- Born: 27 November 1980 (age 45); Vasco da Gama, Goa, India
- Batting: Left-handed
- Bowling: Slow left-arm orthodox
- Role: Bowler

Domestic team information
- Years: Team
- 1998/99-2018: Goa
- 2008-2013: Chennai Super Kings
- 2014: Royal Challengers Bangalore
- 2016-2017: Gujarat Lions

Career statistics
Competition	FC	LA	T20
Matches	92	82	91
Runs scored	2,734	1,104	185
Batting average	22.04	18.40	10.27
100s/50s	1/14	0/4	0/0
Top score	100*	77	43
Balls bowled	19,352	3,876	1,781
Wickets	275	93	73
Bowling average	32.00	35.33	31.23
5 wickets in innings	13	1	1
10 wickets in match	3	0	0
Best bowling	8/53	5/61	5/17
Catches/stumpings	52/–	31/–	35/–
- Source: ESPNcricinfo, 27 December 2016

Shadab Bashir Jakati (born 27 November 1980) is a former Indian cricketer. He is a left-handed batsman and a slow left arm orthodox bowler. He represented Goa in first class cricket and also played for Chennai Super Kings, Royal Challengers Bangalore, and Gujarat Lions in the Indian Premier League.

== Career ==
Jakati made his first class cricket debut in the 1998/99 season for Goa.

In 2008, Shadab Jakati used the IPL to get out of cricketing obscurity. A left-arm orthodox spinner, Jakati got appreciable turn from the South African pitches and was crucial to Chennai Super Kings' surge in the middle stages of the 2009 tournament. He claimed four-fors in back-to-back games, a remarkable achievement in twenty overs, to announce himself. He took 13 wickets in the 2010 IPL season and was part of the CSK team which emerged as champions for the first time during the 2010 edition of the IPL.

In 2014, he was purchased by the Royal Challengers Bangalore, but only played one game in the season; against his former team CSK. He played for the Gujarat Lions in the 2017 season before entering politics. He had played his last first class match in October 2017 and he announced his retirement from playing cricket on 28 December 2019.

He was appointed as the director of cricket operations of the Colombo Kings franchise ahead of the 2020 Lanka Premier League.
