= Vikas Tokas =

Indian cricketer (born 1986)

Personal information
- Born: 16 October 1986 (age 40); Delhi, India
- Batting: Right-handed
- Bowling: Right-arm medium-fast
- Role: Bowler

Domestic team information
- Years: Team
- 2010–2011: Railways
- 2012–2019: Delhi

Career statistics
Competition	FC	LA	T20
Matches	15	11	17
Runs scored	177	33	11
Batting average	13.61	33.00	11.00
100s/50s	0/0	0/0	0/0
Top score	28*	18*	6*
Balls bowled	2,436	544	289
Wickets	32	19	16
Bowling average	41.03	23.89	24.81
5 wickets in innings	0	0	0
10 wickets in match	0	0	0
Best bowling	3/48	4/41	3/23
Catches/stumpings	8/-	2/–	2/–
- Source: ESPNcricinfo, 24 May 2024

Vikas Tokas (born 16 October 1986) is an Indian former cricketer who played for Delhi cricket team in domestic cricket. He was a right-arm medium-fast bowler who bowled at a speed of over 135 km/h. After making his debut for Railways cricket team in 2010, Tokas switched to Delhi in 2012.
