= Eklavya Dwivedi =

Indian cricketer (born 1988)

Personal information
- Full name: Eklavya Rakesh Dwivedi
- Born: 22 July 1988 (age 38); Allahabad, Uttar Pradesh, India
- Batting: Right-handed
- Role: Wicket-keeper

Domestic team information
- Years: Team
- 2006/07–2017/18: Uttar Pradesh
- 2016: Gujarat Lions

Career statistics
Competition	FC	LA	T20
Matches	43	36	47
Runs scored	1,990	993	923
Batting average	30.15	33.10	34.18
100s/50s	3/12	1/5	0/4
Top score	131	104*	89
Catches/stumpings	97/19	44/4	26/9
- Source: ESPNcricinfo, 1 April 2025

Eklavya Rakesh Dwivedi (born 22 July 1988) is an Indian former cricketer. He was a wicket-keeper who played in Indian domestic cricket for Uttar Pradesh. He had been a member of the Pune Warriors India squad between 2011 and 2013. He was a member of the Chennai Super Kings squad in 2015, serving as a backup wicket-keeper for MS Dhoni and Brendon McCullum.

Dwivedi was bought by Sunrisers Hyderabad for Rs 75 Lacs after he scored 258 runs in nine matches at a batting average of 51.60 in the 2015–16 Syed Mushtaq Ali Trophy.
