= Akshdeep Nath =

Indian cricketer (born 1993)

Personal information
- Full name: Akshdeep Deependra Nath
- Born: 10 May 1993 (age 33); Lucknow, Uttar Pradesh, India
- Batting: Right-handed
- Bowling: Right-arm medium-fast
- Role: Batsman, Occasional wicket-keeper

International information
- National side: United Arab Emirates
- ODI debut: 25 April 2026 v Nepal
- Last ODI: 3 May 2026 v Oman
- T20I debut: 20 April 2026 v Nepal
- Last T20I: 21 April 2026 v Nepal

Domestic team information
- Years: Team
- 2011–present: Uttar Pradesh
- 2016–2017: Gujarat Lions (squad no. 10)
- 2018: Kings XI Punjab (squad no. 13)
- 2019: Royal Challengers Bangalore (squad no. 10)

Career statistics
Competition	FC	LA	T20
Matches	51	85	86
Runs scored	2,659	2,704	1,310
Batting average	36.93	45.83	22.98
100s/50s	6/13	6/16	0/4
Top score	194	154*	80
Balls bowled	827	701	264
Wickets	7	18	16
Bowling average	53.12	35.50	21.62
5 wickets in innings	0	0	0
10 wickets in match	0	0	0
Best bowling	2/16	3/44	3/20
Catches/stumpings	27/–	40/–	30/1
- Source: Cricinfo, 5 March 2025

Akshdeep Deependra Nath (born 10 May 1993) is an Indian-born Emirati cricketer who plays for the United Arab Emirates. He is a right-handed batsman and occasional right arm medium pace bowler. He was the vice-captain of the India Under-19 cricket team that won the 2012 ICC Under-19 Cricket World Cup in Australia. He also played for Uttar Pradesh in Indian domestic cricket.

He was the leading run-scorer for Uttar Pradesh in the 2017–18 Ranji Trophy, with 387 runs in five matches. He was also the leading run-scorer for Uttar Pradesh in the 2018–19 Vijay Hazare Trophy, with 293 runs in six matches.

In August 2019, he was named in the India Green team's squad for the 2019–20 Duleep Trophy.

== IPL career ==
In February 2017, he was bought by the Gujarat Lions team for the 2017 Indian Premier League for 10 lakhs. In January 2018, he was bought by the Kings XI Punjab in the 2018 IPL auction. In December 2018, he was bought by the Royal Challengers Bangalore in the player auction for the 2019 Indian Premier League. He was released by the Royal Challengers Bangalore ahead of the 2020 IPL auction.
