= Shivil Kaushik =

Indian cricketer

Shivil Koushik
Personal information
- Full name: Shivil Sharma Kaushik
- Born: 7 September 1995 (age 31); Gurdaspur, Punjab, India
- Batting: Right-handed
- Bowling: Slow left-arm wrist-spin
- Role: Bowler

Domestic team information
- Years: Team
- 2016–2017: Gujarat Lions (squad no. 36)

Career statistics
Competition	Twenty20
Matches	10
Runs scored	0
Batting average	0.00
100s/50s	0/0
Top score	0*
Balls bowled	204
Wickets	6
Bowling average	49.50
5 wickets in innings	0
10 wickets in match	0
Best bowling	3/20
Catches/stumpings	0/–
- Source: ESPNcricinfo, 15 August 2021

Shivil Sharma Kaushik (born 7 September 1995) is an Indian cricketer who plays for Hubli Tigers in the Karnataka Premier League and had played for Gujarat Lions in the Indian Premier League.

After a successful outing in the KPL, Kaushik was signed by Gujarat Lions in the 2016 Indian Premier League auction. Although he didn't feature in the starting XI immediately, he made his Twenty20 debut against Rising Pune Supergiants at Pune on 29 April 2016. He took his best T20 bowling figures of 3 wickets for 20 runs against Kings XI Punjab. His mother is currently a Hindi teacher at Army Public School, Bangalore

He studied at the St. Joseph's College of Commerce in Bangalore.

In 2026, Kaushik was appointed Chief Operating Officer (COO) of Coastal Kings Mangaluru, a franchise in the Maharaja Trophy KSCA T20 League.
