= Ashok Dinda =

Indian cricketer, politician

Personal information
- Full name: Ashok Bhimchandra Dinda
- Born: 25 March 1984 (age 42); Medinipur, West Bengal, India
- Batting: Right-handed
- Bowling: Right-arm fast medium
- Role: Bowler

International information
- National side: India (2009–2013)
- ODI debut (cap 182): 28 May 2010 v Zimbabwe
- Last ODI: 11 January 2013 v England
- ODI shirt no.: 2
- T20I debut (cap 24): 9 December 2009 v Sri Lanka
- Last T20I: 27 December 2012 v Pakistan

Domestic team information
- Years: Team
- 2005–2019: Bengal
- 2008–2010: Kolkata Knight Riders
- 2011: Delhi Daredevils
- 2012–2013: Pune Warriors India (squad no. 2)
- 2014–2015: Royal Challengers Bangalore (squad no. 2)
- 2016–2017: Rising Pune Supergiant (squad no. 11)
- 2020–2021: Goa

Career statistics
Competition	ODI	T20I	FC	LA
Matches	13	12	116	98
Runs scored	21	22	42	327
Batting average	4.20	22.00	9.94	8.60
100s/50s	0/0	0/0	0/2	0/0
Top score	16	19	55*	33
Balls bowled	594	180	22997	5000
Wickets	12	17	420	151
Bowling average	51.00	14.41	28.28	28.5
5 wickets in innings	0	0	26	3
10 wickets in match	0	0	5	0
Best bowling	2/44	4/19	8/123	5/29
Catches/stumpings	1/–	1/–	41/–	25/–
Medal record
Men's Cricket
Representing India
ACC Asia Cup
Winner	2010 Sri Lanka
- Source: ESPNcricinfo, 30 March 2019

Minister of State, Government of West Bengal
- Incumbent
- Assumed office 1 June 2026
- Governor: R. N. Ravi
- Chief Minister: Suvendu Adhikari
- Departments: Micro, Small and Medium Enterprise and Textiles; Agriculture Marketing

Member of West Bengal Legislative Assembly
- Incumbent
- Assumed office 2 May 2021
- Preceded by: Sangram Kumar Dolai
- Constituency: Moyna, Purba Medinipur

Personal details
- Party: Bharatiya Janata Party

Ashok Dinda (born 25 March 1984) is a former Indian cricketer and politician from Medinipur, West Bengal. He is a member of the West Bengal Legislative Assembly representing the Bharatiya Janata Party from the Moyna Assembly constituency. He played cricket for Bengal and Goa in the Ranji Trophy and for many Indian Premier League sides. He retired from all forms of cricket on 2 February 2021. He was a part of the Indian squad which won the 2010 Asia Cup.He is currently serving as the Minister of State for Agriculture Marketing & Micro, Small and Medium Enterprise and Textiles of West Bengal.

== Early and domestic career ==
In the 2012 Indian Premier League, Dinda joined the Pune Warriors India franchise.

He was the leading wicket-taker for Bengal in the 2017–18 Ranji Trophy, with 35 dismissals in eight matches. In July 2018, Dinda was named in the squad for India Green for the 2018–19 Duleep Trophy. He was also the leading wicket-taker for Bengal in the 2018–19 Ranji Trophy, with 28 dismissals in eight matches. On 24 December 2019, Ashok Dinda was axed from the squad due to 'disciplinary reasons' ahead of Bengal's Elite Group A game versus Andhra. On 10 November 2020, Dinda confirmed that his career with Bengal was over. On 15 December 2020, he decided to play for Goa for the 2020–21 season.

== International career ==
Dinda made his T20 international Debut for India on 9 December 2009 against Sri Lanka at Nagpur. He took the wicket of Sanath Jayasuriya. Dinda ended up with figures of 1/34 in 3 overs. While batting, he scored 19 runs off 20 deliveries before being bowled by Tillakaratne Dilshan.

Dinda made his ODI debut against Zimbabwe in June 2010. He bowled 7.2 overs and took 0/49. He was picked for the 2010 Asia Cup squad in Sri Lanka. However, Dinda played only one game in that tournament, a group stage match against Sri Lanka, in which he ended up with figures of 0 for 39 in 5 overs.

== Electoral Performance ==
West Bengal Legislative Assembly
Year	Constituency	Party	Votes	%	Opponent	Party	Votes	%	Margin	in %	Result
2021	Moyna	BJP	1,08,109	48.17	Sangram Dolui	AITC	106,849	47.61	1,260	0.56	Won
2026	Moyna	BJP	1,27,166	51.62	Chandan Mondal	AITC	1,10,925	45.03	16,241	6.59	Won

== See also ==
- Moyna
