= Rising Pune Supergiant =

Pune based franchise cricket team of the Indian Premier League

Personnel
- Captain: M.S. Dhoni (2016); Steve Smith (2017)
- Owner: RP-Sanjiv Goenka Group

Team information
- City: Pune, Maharashtra, India
- Founded: 2016; 10 years ago
- Dissolved: 2017; 9 years ago
- Home ground: Maharashtra Cricket Association Stadium, Pune
- Secondary home ground(s): ACA–VDCA Cricket Stadium, Visakhapatnam
IPL kit
(2016–2017)

Rising Pune Supergiant (often abbreviated as RPS) was a franchise cricket team based in Pune, Maharashtra, that played in the Indian Premier League in 2016 and as a finalist in 2017. It was the second team representing Pune after Pune Warriors India. The team, along with Gujarat Lions, featured as two-season replacements for Chennai Super Kings and Rajasthan Royals, who were suspended due to their involvement in illegal betting by their respective owners. This team was disbanded after Chennai Super Kings returned to the IPL in 2018.

The Rising Pune Supergiant franchise was owned by RP-Sanjiv Goenka Group controlled by Sanjiv Goenka. The team name was announced (as Rising Pune Supergiants) on 18 January 2016 by Goenka in Kolkata and Raghu Iyer was appointed CEO. The owners changed the team name to Rising Pune Supergiant on 26 March 2017. The team lost the 2017 IPL Final to Mumbai Indians by 1 run, which was the team's last game in the IPL.

However, the same owner bought another franchise Lucknow Super Giants in February 2022. It is now among the 10 teams of the league and takes part in it.

== Home ground ==
The Rising Pune Supergiant's home ground was the Maharashtra Cricket Association Stadium in Pune. However, controversies arose over holding 2016 IPL games in Maharashtra due to water usage of the cricket stadiums during severe drought and the Bombay High Court ordered all matches in May to be shifted out of the state. On 15 April 2016, it was reported that the Rising Pune Supergiants were considering the ACA-VDCA Cricket Stadium in Vishakhapatnam as an alternate home ground.

== Seasons ==
=== Indian Premier League ===
Year	League standing	Final standing
2016	7th out of 8	League stage
2017	2nd out of 8	Runners-up

== Sponsors and partners ==
Year	Kit manufacturer	Shirt sponsors (front)	Shirt sponsors (back)
2016–2017	Seven	KENT RO Systems	Spykar Jeans
2017–2018	Seven	Moto	Spykar Jeans

== Results summary ==
=== 2016 season ===
The Rising Pune Supergiants made an excellent start to the season, convincingly winning their first game against the defending champions, Mumbai Indians, by 9 wickets. However, they went on to lose their next four games - against the Gujarat Lions, Kings XI Punjab, Royal Challengers Bangalore and the Kolkata Knight Riders. The inclusion of Ashok Dinda, in their 6th game of the season, provided a brief inspiration as the Supergiants beat the Sunrisers Hyderabad by 34 runs. They lost the next two games - against the Gujarat Lions and the Mumbai Indians - at the Maharashtra Cricket Association Stadium in Pune. The Supergiants were also briefly bolstered by the arrival of Australian batsmen Usman Khawaja and George Bailey against the Delhi Daredevils at the Feroz Shah Kotla and went on to win the game by 7 wickets. Pune's last game of the season was against Kings XI Punjab, with the loser finishing at the bottom of the points table. RPS was struggling to chase down a total of 172 despite a good start from the openers and they kept losing wickets at constant intervals. RPS needed 23 runs from the last over which was bowled by Axar Patel with captain MS Dhoni on the crease. After a wide, four, six and two dot balls, RPS were left requiring 12 runs from the last two balls. It seemed the game was over but Dhoni hit two sixes off the last two balls. This win ensured RPS didn't finish at the bottom of the points table. At the end of the 2016 IPL, the Supergiants won only 5 games out of 14, and won only 2 of their 7 home games - 4 at the MCA Stadium in Pune and 3 at their new home ground, the ACA-VDCA Cricket Stadium in Vishakhapatnam. They finished at seventh place in the IPL points table.

=== 2017 season ===
After the auction, Pune MS Dhoni as captain and Steve Smith was appointed captain barely months before the start of the 2017 season. The franchise then changed their name to Rising Pune Supergiant, removing the 's', on 26 March 2017. Washington Sundar replaced Ravichandran Ashwin who was ruled out of the tournament with a sports hernia. RPS bought Ben Stokes for ₹14.5 Crore at the auction, making him the most expensive overseas player in the history of IPL at the time (this record was later broken when his own franchise Lucknow Super Giants brought Rishabh Pant for 27 Crores in the 2024 IPL Player Auction). Imran Tahir was recruited by RPS to replace Mitchell Marsh, who was once again ruled out of the tournament due to a shoulder injury. This decision proved to be extremely decisive, as Imran Tahir went on to take 18 wickets in 12 games for RPS before leaving for his national team, along with Faf du Plessis.

RPS once again got off to a great start in IPL 2017 by beating the Mumbai Indians by 7 wickets in their first game. However, losses against Kings XI Punjab, Delhi Daredevils and Gujarat Lions followed and it seemed like Pune were repeating what took place last year. However, results picked up and RPS won 7 out of their next 8 games, all of them by close margins, with the top performers being Rahul Tripathi, Jaydev Unadkat, Ben Stokes, MS Dhoni and Imran Tahir. But a 6-day gap left them rusty and RPS lost to Delhi Daredevils by 7 runs, forcing them to win their last game vs Punjab to qualify. In their do-or-die game vs Punjab, RPS skittled them out for 73 and won comfortably by 9 wickets, thus finishing in second place with 18 points and qualifying for the play-offs.

RPS faced the Mumbai Indians in Qualifier 1 at the Wankhede Stadium in Mumbai, with a win securing them a spot in the final. RPS batted first and posted a slightly below-par total of 162–4, with 41 runs coming from the last two overs, thanks to well-paced innings from Manoj Tiwary and Ajinkya Rahane and a late surge from MS Dhoni. Washington Sundar ripped apart the middle order of the Indians and finished with career best figures of 3–16 in 4 overs. Shardul Thakur and Jaydev Unadkat chipped in as Pune beat the Mumbai Indians comfortably by 20 runs.

RPS faced the Mumbai Indians for the fourth time in the season, in the final at Hyderabad. This was Rising Pune Supergiant's last game in the IPL. RPS had a psychological edge over Mumbai, considering RPS had beaten them on all three meetings in the season. Rohit Sharma won the toss and decided to bat first. Jaydev Unadkat and Adam Zampa took key wickets as Mumbai crumbled to 79-7 but a late surge from Krunal Pandya meant that Mumbai finished with a slightly below par score of 129–8. RPS looked comfortable after the powerplay but over-cautious batting cost them dearly. Ajinkya Rahane scored runs easily but captain Steve Smith struggled and things took a turn when Rahane got out for 44. MS Dhoni arrived but was quickly removed for 10 and Pune were left requiring 11 runs from the last over with Smith and Manoj Tiwary at the crease. Tiwary hit a four on the first ball off Mitchell Johnson's bowling and RPS looked to have the trophy in the bag. But Smith and Tiwary got out off consecutive deliveries which left RPS requiring 7 runs from 3 balls. A single from Washington Sundar and a double from Daniel Christian meant RPS required 4 runs from the last ball. Unfortunately, RPS could only complete two runs before Sundar was run out. Thus, Mumbai Indians won by 1 run to get their 3rd IPL title.

== Performance summary ==
=== Indian Premier League ===
Year	Pld	Won	Loss	NR	Tied	Win(%)	Position	Summary
2016	14	5	9	0	0	35.71%	7	Group stage
2017	16	10	6	0	0	62.5%	2	Runners-Up

== Records ==
=== Most runs ===
Player	Matches	Runs	Batting average
Ajinkya Rahane	30	862	33.15
Steve Smith	23	742	41.22
MS Dhoni	30	574	31.88
Rahul Tripathi	14	391	27.92
Manoj Tiwary	15	324	32.40
Source: ESPNcricinfo

=== Most wickets ===
Player	Matches	Wickets	Best bowling	Bowling average
Jaydev Unadkat	12	24	5/30	13.41
Adam Zampa	11	19	6/19	14.63
Imran Tahir	12	18	3/18	20.50
Ben Stokes	12	12	3/18	26.33
Ashok Dinda	12	12	3/20	29.16
Source: ESPNcricinfo

== See also ==
- Lucknow Super Giants
