= Gujarat Lions =

Rajkot based franchise cricket team of the Indian Premier League

Personnel
- Captain: Suresh Raina
- Coach: Brad Hodge
- Owner: Intex Technologies

Team information
- City: Rajkot, Gujarat, India
- Founded: 2016; 10 years ago
- Dissolved: 2017; 9 years ago
- Home ground: Niranjan Shah Stadium, Rajkot
- Secondary home ground(s): Green Park Stadium, Kanpur
T20I kit

Gujarat Lions was a franchise cricket team based in the city of Rajkot, that represented the Indian state of Gujarat in the Indian Premier League (IPL). The team played in the IPL, along with Rising Pune Supergiant for two season between 2016 and 2017 as one of the replacements for Chennai Super Kings and Rajasthan Royals who were both suspended for two seasons due to illegal betting by their respective owners. The franchise was owned by Intex Technologies. They had to be disbanded after Rajasthan Royals returned to the IPL in 2018.

However, Gujarat made a return to the tournament with another franchise named Gujarat Titans (based in Ahmedabad), owned by the Torrent Group and CVC Capital Partners joined the IPL in 2022, which is one of the 10 teams currently to complete in the IPL.

== History ==
=== 2016 ===
The team played five of their home matches at Niranjan Shah Stadium, Rajkot and two of their home matches at Green Park Stadium, Kanpur in the IPL 2016. In IPL 2016, the team won 9 matches, and topped the points table.

=== 2017 ===
In 2017, the team won four matches out of fourteen, and did not qualify for the playoffs.

The team did not receive an extension to play in further seasons of the tournament, and has been defunct since 2017. In 2022, another Gujarat based team, the Gujarat Titans, entered the IPL.

== Team identity ==
The team logo featured a lion. The team song is called "Game mari che" (The Game is ours, in Gujarati).

== Sponsors and partners ==
Year	Kit manufacturer	Shirt sponsors (front)	Shirt sponsors (back)
2016–2017	TYKA	Oxigen	TVS Tyres
2017–2018	SG	Shudh Plus	Valvoline
