= 2002 Under-19 Cricket World Cup squads =

Sixteen members of the International Cricket Council (ICC) fielded teams at the 2002 Under-19 Cricket World Cup in New Zealand. Only one team, Canada, was making its debut.

== Australia ==
Coach: (Australia) Wayne B. Phillips

- Cameron White (c)
- George Bailey
- Aaron Bird
- Jarrad Burke
- Rob Cassell
- Beau Casson
- Daniel Christian
- Mark Cosgrove
- Adam Crosthwaite
- Xavier Doherty
- Adam Fleming
- Shaun Marsh
- Craig Philipson
- Craig Simmons

Source: ESPNcricinfo

== Bangladesh ==
Coach: (Bangladesh) Jalal Ahmed Chowdhury

- Mashrafe Mortaza (c)
- Aftab Ahmed
- Ali Arman
- Ashiqur Rahman
- Gazi Salahuddin
- Hasibul Haque
- Mohammad Ashraful
- Murad Khan
- Nafees Iqbal
- Shafaq Al Zabir
- Shafiul Alam
- Shariful Islam
- Syed Rasel
- Talha Jubair
- Wasseluddin Ahmed

Source: ESPNcricinfo

== Canada ==
Coach: (Australia) Jeff Thomas

- Ashish Bagai (c)
- Soham Anjaria
- Christopher Argunen
- Umar Bhatti
- Travis Ganga
- Ajay Minhas
- Aneel Nauth
- Devin Persaud
- Gibran Rahaman
- Nathan Richards
- Glen Roberts
- Jonathan Roberts
- Jason Sandher
- Paul Ziesmann

Source: ESPNcricinfo

== England ==
Coach: (England) Paul Farbrace

- Nicky Peng (c)
- Kadeer Ali
- Tim Bresnan
- Nick Compton
- Chris Gilbert
- Kyle Hogg
- Nadeem Malik
- Paul McMahon
- Gordon Muchall
- Samit Patel
- Stephen Pope
- Mark Pettini
- Alex Roberts (cricketer)
- Bilal Shafayat

Source: ESPNcricinfo

== India ==
Coach: (India) Balwinder Sandhu

- Parthiv Patel (c)
- Chandrashekhar Atram
- Stuart Binny
- Manvinder Bisla
- Deepak Chougule
- Chandan Madan
- Mohnish Mishra
- Rakesh Mohanty
- Khanin Saikia
- Irfan Pathan
- Gnaneswara Rao
- Abhishek Sharma
- Tirumalasetti Suman
- Siddharth Trivedi
- Paul Valthaty
- Suresh Raina

Source: ESPNcricinfo

== Kenya ==
Coach: (Kenya) Tito Odumbe

- Ragheb Aga
- Rajesh Bhudia
- Anand Gore
- Ashish Karia
- Jadavji Laxman
- Alfred Luseno
- Timothy Muange
- Nehemiah Odhiambo
- Morris Ouma
- Samson Ouma
- Kalpesh Patel
- Manoj Patel
- Rajesh Varsai
- Hiren Varaiya

Source: ESPNcricinfo

== Namibia ==
Coach: (Namibia) Werner Jeffrey

- Stephan Swanepoel (c)
- Ronald Cloete
- Michael Durant
- Hendrik Geldenhuys
- Olivin Glen-Spyron
- Michael Greeff
- Dirk Grobler
- Kirsten Isaacs
- Hugo Ludik
- Johannes Nel
- Paul Steyn
- Colin Steytler
- Burton van Rooi
- Tobias Verwey

Source: ESPNcricinfo

== Nepal ==
Coach: (Sri Lanka) Roy Dias

- Pramod Basnet
- Bardan Chalise
- Prem Chaudhary
- Kanishka Chaugai
- Binod Das
- Shakti Gauchan
- Manoj Katuwal
- Lakpa Lama
- Basanta Regmi
- Sanjam Regmi
- Rohit Sharma
- Manjeet Shrestha
- Yashwant Subedi
- Basudev Thapa

Source: ESPNcricinfo

== New Zealand ==
Coach: (New Zealand) Mark Greatbatch

- Ross Taylor (c)
- Simon Allen
- Michael Bates
- Peter Borren
- Neil Broom
- Leighton Burtt
- Brook Hatwell
- Stephen Murdoch
- Rob Nicol
- Iain Robertson
- Jesse Ryder
- Ian Sandbrook
- Jordan Sheed
- Richard Sherlock

Source: ESPNcricinfo

== Pakistan ==
- Salman Butt (c)
- Amin-ur-Rehman
- Arsalan Mir
- Asim Munir
- Atiq-ur-Rehman
- Azhar Ali
- Irfanuddin
- Junaid Zia
- Kamran Sajid
- Kamran Younis
- Khaqan Arsal
- Mohammad Fayyaz
- Najaf Shah
- Umar Gul

Source: ESPNcricinfo

== Papua New Guinea ==
Coach: (Papua New Guinea) Vavine Pala

- Christopher Amini
- Peter Arua
- Greg Baeau
- John Boto
- Kohu Dai
- Mahuru Dai
- Clive Elly
- William Harry
- Frank Joseph
- Vivian Kila
- Gima Keimolo
- Mahuta Kivung
- William Mula
- Kalei Wamala

Source: ESPNcricinfo

== Scotland ==
Coach: (Scotland) William Morton

- Craig Anderson
- Kyle Coetzer
- Stuart Coetzer
- Alisdair Eccles
- Steven Gilmour
- John Gray
- Moneeb Iqbal
- Stewart Leggat
- Brendan McKerchar
- Robert More
- Zaheer Mohammed
- Stuart Murray
- Qasim Sheikh
- Harmanjit Singh
- Christopher West

Source: ESPNcricinfo

== South Africa ==
Coach: (South Africa) Hylton Ackerman

- Hashim Amla (c)
- Ryan Bailey
- Chad Baxter
- Stephen Cook
- Riel de Kock
- Zwelibanzi Homani
- David Jacobs
- Imraan Khan
- Rory Kleinveldt
- Brent Kops
- Ryan McLaren
- Ian Postman
- Brendon Reddy
- Greg Smith

Source: ESPNcricinfo

== Sri Lanka ==
Coach: (Sri Lanka) Owen Mottau

- Dhammika Niroshana (c)
- Eshan Abeysingha
- Charith Sylvester Fernando
- Lasith Fernando
- Kanchana Gunawardene
- Damith Indika
- Dilshan Seneviratna
- Farveez Maharoof
- Jeewan Mendis
- Sumalka Perera
- Dhammika Prasad
- Daminda Ranawaka
- Upul Tharanga
- Omesh Wijesiriwardene

Source: ESPNcricinfo

== West Indies ==
Coach: (Trinidad and Tobago) Gus Logie

- Dwayne Bravo
- Narsingh Deonarine
- Alcindo Holder
- Lorenzo Ingram
- Gareth Matthew
- Ron Matthews
- Ryan Nurse
- Donovan Pagon
- Ravi Rampaul
- Darren Sammy
- Shane Shillingford
- Lendl Simmons
- Gavin Tonge
- Tonito Willett

Source: ESPNcricinfo

== Zimbabwe ==
Coach: (England) Steve Rhodes

- Tatenda Taibu (c)
- Conan Brewer
- Elton Chigumbura
- Charles Coventry
- Andrew Durham
- Sean Ervine
- Stanley Marisa
- Hamilton Masakadza
- Stuart Matsikenyeri
- Alfred Mbwembwe
- Waddington Mwayenga
- Jordane Nicolle
- Sharezad Omarshah
- Brendan Taylor

Source: ESPNcricinfo

== Sources ==
- Team averages, ICC Under-19 World Cup 2001/02 – CricketArchive
- Team lists, ICC Under-19 World Cup 2002 – ESPNcricinfo
