= 2000 Under-19 Cricket World Cup squads =

List of squads from the 2000 Under-19 Cricket World Cup

Sixteen members of the International Cricket Council (ICC) fielded teams at the 2000 Under-19 Cricket World Cup in Sri Lanka. Some information about squad members (including playing styles, dates of births, and even full names) is unavailable, especially for ICC associate members.

== Group A ==
=== Americas ===
Coach: (Canada) Ron Dipchand

Player	Date of birth	Batting	Bowling style	Nationality
Ashish Bagai (c, wk)	26 January 1982 (aged 17)	Right	—	Canada
Shahid Elani	16 November 1981 (aged 18)	Right	Right-arm medium	United States
Chris Foggo	7 May 1982 (aged 17)	Right	—	Bermuda
Carlos Gibson	3 August 1981 (aged 18)	Right	—	Argentina
Landro Minors	24 February 1984 (aged 15)	Left	—	Bermuda
Ashif Mulla (wk)	5 May 1980 (aged 19)	Right	—	Canada
Steven Outerbridge	20 May 1983 (aged 16)	Left	Right-arm off-spin	Bermuda
Lucas Paterlini	6 June 1982 (aged 17)	Right	Right-arm medium-fast	Argentina
Oliver Pitcher	27 May 1983 (aged 16)	Right	Right-arm medium	Bermuda
Pablo Ryan	21 February 1983 (aged 16)	Right	Right-arm fast-medium	Argentina
Kevin Sandher	16 July 1980 (aged 19)	Right	Left-arm orthodox	Canada
Guyan Stewart	18 January 1980 (aged 19)	Right	Right-arm medium	United States
Zubin Surkari	26 February 1980 (aged 19)	Right	Right-arm medium	Canada
Lloyd West	22 April 1982 (aged 17)	Right	Right-arm medium	United States

Source: ESPNcricinfo

=== England ===
Manager: (England) James Whitaker

Player	Date of birth	Batting	Bowling style
Alex Loudon (c)	6 September 1980 (aged 19)	Right	Right-arm off-spin
Ian Bell	11 April 1982 (aged 17)	Right	Right-arm medium
Justin Bishop	4 January 1982 (aged 18)	Left	Left-arm medium-fast
Graeme Bridge	4 September 1980 (aged 19)	Right	Left-arm orthodox
Michael Carberry	29 September 1980 (aged 19)	Left	Right-arm off-spin
David Harrison	30 July 1981 (aged 18)	Right	Right-arm fast-medium
John Maunders	4 April 1981 (aged 18)	Left	Right-arm medium
Tim Murtagh	2 August 1981 (aged 18)	Left	Right-arm fast-medium
Ian Pattison	5 May 1982 (aged 17)	Right	Right-arm medium
Tim Phillips	13 March 1981 (aged 18)	Left	Left-arm orthodox
Gary Pratt	22 December 1981 (aged 18)	Left	Right-arm off-spin
John Sadler	19 November 1981 (aged 18)	Left	Right-arm leg-spin
Mark Wallace (wk)	19 November 1981 (aged 18)	Left	—
Nick Warren	26 June 1982 (aged 17)	Right	Right-arm fast-medium

Source: ESPNcricinfo

=== West Indies ===
Coach: (Trinidad and Tobago) Gus Logie

Player	Date of birth	Batting	Bowling style	Nationality
Ryan Hinds (c)	17 February 1981 (aged 18)	Left	Left-arm orthodox	Barbados
Camilus Alexander	20 October 1981 (aged 18)	Right	Right-arm leg-spin	Grenada
Zaheer Ali	17 January 1981 (aged 18)	Left	Left-arm medium	Trinidad and Tobago
Sewnarine Chattergoon	3 April 1981 (aged 18)	Left	Right-arm leg-spin	Guyana
Narsingh Deonarine	16 August 1983 (aged 16)	Left	Right-arm off-spin	Guyana
Greg Francois (wk)	11 March 1981 (aged 18)	Right	—	Dominica
Jermaine Lawson	13 January 1982 (aged 17)	Right	Right-arm fast-medium	Jamaica
Carlitos Lopez	10 December 1980 (aged 19)	Right	Right-arm fast-medium	Barbados
Brenton Parchment	24 June 1982 (aged 17)	Right	Right-arm off-spin	Jamaica
Kenroy Peters	24 February 1982 (aged 17)	Right	Left-arm medium	Saint Vincent
Roopnarine Ramgobin	23 September 1983 (aged 16)	Right	Right-arm off-spin	Guyana
Andrew Richardson	6 September 1981 (aged 18)	Left	Right-arm fast-medium	Trinidad and Tobago
Marlon Samuels (vc)	5 February 1981 (aged 18)	Right	Right-arm off-spin	Jamaica
Rodney Sooklal	21 December 1980 (aged 19)	Right	Right-arm medium	Trinidad and Tobago
Kurt Wilkinson	14 August 1981 (aged 18)	Right	Right-arm medium	Barbados

Source: ESPNcricinfo

=== Zimbabwe ===
Coach: (Zimbabwe) Andy Waller

Player	Date of birth	Batting	Bowling style
Mluleki Nkala (c)	1 April 1981 (aged 18)	Right	Right-arm medium
Conan Brewer	30 September 1982 (aged 17)	Right	Right-arm medium
Guy Croxford	2 June 1981 (aged 18)	Right	Right-arm medium
Sean Ervine	6 December 1982 (aged 17)	Left	Right-arm medium
Gavin Ewing	21 January 1981 (aged 18)	Right	Right-arm off-spin
Travis Friend (vc)	7 January 1981 (aged 19)	Right	Right-arm fast-medium
Hilton Henderson	15 April 1981 (aged 18)	Right	Right-arm medium
Greg Lamb	4 March 1981 (aged 18)	Right	Right-arm off-spin
Campbell Macmillan	16 April 1982 (aged 17)	Right	Right-arm medium
Alester Maregwede (wk)	5 August 1981 (aged 18)	Right	—
Hamilton Masakadza	9 August 1983 (aged 16)	Right	Right-arm medium
Michael Munson	25 June 1981 (aged 18)	Right	Right-arm medium
Michael Sherren (wk)	13 March 1981 (aged 18)	Right	—
Tatenda Taibu (wk)	14 May 1983 (aged 16)	Right	Right-arm medium

Source: ESPNcricinfo

== Group B ==
=== Bangladesh ===
Coach: (Bangladesh) Dipu Roy Chowdhury

Player	Date of birth	Batting	Bowling style
Hannan Sarkar (c)	1 December 1982 (aged 17)	Right	Right-arm medium
Abu Nasher	4 February 1982 (aged 17)	Right	Right-arm off-spin
Anwar Hossain Monir	31 December 1981 (aged 18)	Right	Right-arm fast-medium
Arman Hossain	22 June 1983 (aged 16)	Right	—
Kuntal Chandra (wk)	8 November 1984 (aged 15)	Right	—
Mahfuz Kabir	28 December 1982 (aged 17)	Right	Right-arm off-spin
Mohammad Ashraful	7 July 1984 (aged 15)	Right	Right-arm off-spin
Mohammad Kalim	5 May 1983 (aged 16)	Right	Right-arm off-spin
Mohammad Salim (wk)	15 October 1981 (aged 18)	Right	—
Mosaddek Hossain	25 November 1983 (aged 16)	Right	Right-arm leg-spin
Nahidul Haque	10 April 1982 (aged 17)	Left	Left-arm orthodox
Rajin Saleh	20 November 1983 (aged 16)	Right	Right-arm off-spin
Ranjan Das	14 July 1982 (aged 17)	Right	Left-arm fast-medium
Tarikul Hasan	9 December 1981 (aged 18)	Right	Right-arm medium

Source: ESPNcricinfo

=== India ===
India's squad was announced on 3 January 2000.

Coach: (India) Roger Binny

Player	Date of birth	Batting	Bowling style
Mohammad Kaif (c)	1 December 1980 (aged 19)	Right	Right-arm off-spin
Anup Dave	2 May 1981 (aged 18)	Left	Left-arm orthodox
Mihir Diwakar	10 December 1982 (aged 17)	Right	Right-arm medium
Niraj Patel	26 March 1981 (aged 18)	Left	—
Venugopal Rao	26 February 1982 (aged 17)	Right	Right-arm off-spin
Ajay Ratra (wk)	13 December 1981 (aged 18)	Right	Right-arm medium
Ravneet Ricky	17 October 1980 (aged 19)	Right	—
Manish Sharma	30 June 1981 (aged 18)	Right	Left-arm orthodox
Yuvraj Singh	12 December 1981 (aged 18)	Left	Left-arm orthodox
Vidyut Sivaramakrishnan	3 December 1981 (aged 18)	Left	Left-arm orthodox
Reetinder Sodhi (vc)	18 October 1980 (aged 19)	Right	Right-arm medium
Shalabh Srivastava	22 September 1981 (aged 18)	Right	Left-arm fast-medium
Mritunjay Tripathi	13 December 1981 (aged 18)	Right	Right-arm medium
Arjun Yadav	23 December 1981 (aged 18)	Right

Source: ESPNcricinfo

=== Netherlands ===
Player	Date of birth	Batting	Bowling style
Reinout van Ierschot (c)	7 November 1980 (aged 19)	Right	Right-arm medium
Rifaiz Bakas	5 May 1982 (aged 17)	Left	Right-arm medium
Gijs Bins	2 July 1980 (aged 19)	Right	Right-arm off-spin
Atse Buurman (wk)	21 March 1982 (aged 17)	Right	—
Remco de Graaf	8 September 1981 (aged 18)	Right	Right-arm medium
Tobias de Rooij (wk)	29 April 1980 (aged 19)	Right	—
Klaas Kout	8 August 1980 (aged 19)	Left	Left-arm medium
Ejaz Nawaz	8 May 1980 (aged 19)	Right	Right-arm medium
Frank Nijman	1 February 1980 (aged 19)	Right	Right-arm medium
Baud Postma	18 May 1982 (aged 17)	Right	Right-arm medium
Adeel Raja	15 August 1980 (aged 19)	Right	Right-arm off-spin
Kamran Shafiq	26 April 1981 (aged 18)	Right	Right-arm off-spin
Vikash Tewarie	12 December 1981 (aged 18)	Right	Left-arm medium-fast
Daan van Bunge	19 October 1982 (aged 17)	Right	Right-arm leg-spin

Source: ESPNcricinfo

=== New Zealand ===
Coach: (New Zealand) Dayle Hadlee

Player	Date of birth	Batting	Bowling style
James Franklin (c)	7 November 1980 (aged 19)	Left	Left-arm medium
Ian Butler	24 November 1981 (aged 18)	Right	Right-arm fast
Gareth Hayne	13 June 1981 (aged 18)	Right	Right-arm off-spin
Nick Horsley	22 September 1980 (aged 19)	Left	Right-arm off-spin
Jamie How	19 May 1981 (aged 18)	Right	Right-arm medium
Gareth Irwin	6 March 1981 (aged 18)	Left	Left-arm medium-fast
Rob Lynch (wk)	25 May 1982 (aged 17)	Left	—
Brendon McCullum (wk)	27 September 1981 (aged 18)	Right	Right-arm medium
Nathan McCullum	1 September 1980 (aged 19)	Right	Right-arm off-spin
Jonathan McNamee	12 October 1980 (aged 19)	Right	Right-arm medium
Leighton Morgan	16 February 1981 (aged 18)	Right	Left-arm orthodox
Taraia Robin	30 August 1982 (aged 17)	Right	Right-arm fast-medium
Gareth Shaw	14 February 1982 (aged 17)	Right	Right-arm medium-fast
Shanan Stewart	21 June 1982 (aged 17)	Right	Right-arm medium

Source: ESPNcricinfo

== Group C ==
=== Kenya ===
Coach: (Australia) Bob Dieckmann

Player	Date of birth	Batting	Bowling style
Mohammad Sheikh (c)	29 August 1980 (aged 19)	Left	Left-arm orthodox
Josephat Ababu	14 May 1980 (aged 19)	Right	Right-arm fast-medium
Amit Bhudia	28 April 1980 (aged 19)	Right	Right-arm medium
Anand Gore (wk)	19 March 1981 (aged 18)	Right	Right-arm leg-spin
Bharat Halai	8 September 1981 (aged 18)	Right	Right-arm off-spin
Vijay Lalji	12 March 1981 (aged 18)	Right	Right-arm medium
Timothy Muange	16 February 1984 (aged 15)	Right	Right-arm off-spin
Collins Obuya	27 July 1981 (aged 18)	Right	Right-arm leg-spin
Jared Odhiambo	—	Right	Right-arm medium
Nicholos Odhiambo	3 June 1980 (aged 19)	Right	—
Morris Ouma (wk)	8 November 1982 (aged 17)	Right	Right-arm off-spin
Kalpesh Patel	18 July 1985 (aged 14)	Right	Right-arm medium
Nitin Patel	—	Right	Right-arm medium
Sanil Patel	18 January 1983 (aged 16)	Right	Right-arm off-spin

Source: ESPNcricinfo

=== Nepal ===
Coach: (Nepal) Arun Aryal

Player	Date of birth	Batting	Bowling style
Binod Das (c)	26 April 1983 (aged 16)	Right	Right-arm medium
Kiran Agrawal	6 December 1980 (aged 19)	Right	—
Aamir Akhtar	—	Left	Left-arm medium
Mahaboob Alam	31 August 1981 (aged 18)	Left	Left-arm medium
Kalamuddin Ansari (wk)	—	Right	—
Manoj Baishya (wk)	25 March 1980 (aged 19)	Right	—
Raju Basnyat	9 January 1980 (aged 20)	Left	Right-arm leg-spin
Dipendra Chaudhary	8 January 1980 (aged 20)	Right	Right-arm medium
Parash Luniya	29 June 1981 (aged 18)	Left	Left-arm orthodox
Ajay Ramdam	—	Right	Right-arm slow
Uttam Saru	—	Right	—
Virendra Shah	—	Right	—
Sandip Shrestha	11 March 1980 (aged 19)	Right	Right-arm off-spin
Unil Shrestha	—	Right	Right-arm medium

Source: ESPNcricinfo

=== Pakistan ===
Player	Date of birth	Batting	Bowling style
Hasan Raza (c)	11 March 1982 (aged 17)	Right	Right-arm off-spin
Babar Naeem	1 January 1983 (aged 17)	Left	Left-arm orthodox
Danish Kaneria	16 December 1980 (aged 19)	Right	Right-arm leg-spin
Faisal Iqbal	30 December 1981 (aged 18)	Right	Right-arm medium
Humayun Farhat (wk)	24 January 1981 (aged 18)	Right	—
Irfan Fazil	2 November 1981 (aged 18)	Right	Right-arm fast-medium
Imran Farhat	20 May 1982 (aged 17)	Left	Right-arm leg-spin
Imran Nazir	16 December 1981 (aged 18)	Right	Right-arm leg-spin
Jannisar Khan	6 October 1981 (aged 18)	Right	Right-arm medium
Mohammad Sami	24 February 1981 (aged 18)	Right	Right-arm fast
Shoaib Malik	1 February 1982 (aged 17)	Right	Right-arm off-spin
Taufeeq Umar	20 May 1981 (aged 18)	Left	Right-arm off-spin
Yasir Arafat	12 March 1982 (aged 17)	Right	Right-arm fast-medium
Zahid Saeed	5 July 1981 (aged 18)	Right	Left-arm fast-medium

Source: ESPNcricinfo

=== South Africa ===
Coach: (South Africa) Anton Ferreira

Player	Date of birth	Batting	Bowling style
Thami Tsolekile (c, wk)	9 October 1980 (aged 19)	Right	Right-arm off-spin
Peter Abrahams	25 January 1981 (aged 18)	Right	Right-arm leg-spin
Umar Abrahams	7 February 1981 (aged 18)	Left	Right-arm medium-fast
Johan Botha	2 May 1982 (aged 17)	Right	Right-arm off-spin
Rivash Gobind	20 April 1982 (aged 17)	Left	Right-arm medium-fast
Bob Homani (wk)	12 December 1983 (aged 16)	Right	—
Dumisa Makalima	29 December 1980 (aged 19)	Right	Right-arm off-spin
Albie Morkel	10 June 1981 (aged 18)	Left	Right-arm medium-fast
Johann Myburgh	22 October 1980 (aged 19)	Right	Right-arm off-spin
Andrew Puttick (wk)	11 December 1980 (aged 19)	Left	—
Jacques Rudolph	4 May 1981 (aged 18)	Left	Right-arm leg-spin
Dewald Senekal	12 January 1981 (aged 18)	Right	Right-arm fast-medium
Graeme Smith	1 February 1981 (aged 18)	Left	Right-arm off-spin
Jonathan Trott	22 April 1981 (aged 18)	Right	Right-arm medium

Source: ESPNcricinfo

== Group D ==
=== Australia ===
Coach: (Australia) Rod Marsh

Player	Date of birth	Batting	Bowling style
Michael Clarke (c)	2 April 1981 (aged 18)	Right	Left-arm orthodox
Matthew Baker	23 November 1980 (aged 19)	Right	Right-arm fast
Glen Batticciotto	18 August 1981 (aged 18)	Left	Right-arm medium
Liam Buchanan	1 November 1980 (aged 19)	Right	Right-arm fast-medium
Ed Cowan	16 June 1982 (aged 17)	Left	Right-arm leg-spin
Chris Hartley (wk)	24 May 1982 (aged 17)	Left	—
Nathan Hauritz (vc)	18 October 1981 (aged 18)	Right	Right-arm off-spin
Mitchell Johnson	2 November 1981 (aged 18)	Left	Left-arm fast
Shaun Marsh	9 July 1983 (aged 16)	Left	Left-arm orthodox
Andrew McDonald	5 June 1981 (aged 18)	Right	Right-arm fast-medium
Aaron O'Brien	2 October 1981 (aged 18)	Right	Right-arm medium-fast
Paul Rofe	16 January 1981 (aged 18)	Right	Right-arm fast-medium
Shane Watson	17 June 1981 (aged 18)	Right	Right-arm fast-medium
Tim Welsford	22 April 1982 (aged 17)	Right	Right-arm fast-medium

Source: ESPNcricinfo

=== Ireland ===
Player	Date of birth	Batting	Bowling style
Peter Shields (c, wk)	31 October 1979 (aged 20)	Right	—
Dwayne McGerrigle	12 March 1980 (aged 19)	Right	Right-arm medium
Ryan Haire	1 May 1981 (aged 18)	Left	Right-arm leg-spin
Andrew White	3 July 1980 (aged 19)	Right	Right-arm off-spin
Alan O'Prey	3 February 1980 (aged 19)	Left	Right-arm medium
Conor Armstrong	17 December 1980 (aged 19)	Left	Right-arm medium
John Mooney	10 February 1982 (aged 17)	Left	Right-arm medium
Jonathon Gardiner	—	Right	Right-arm medium
Keith Hogg	14 May 1981 (aged 18)	Right	Right-arm leg-spin
Dom Joyce	14 June 1981 (aged 18)	Right	—
Duncan Smythe	1 September 1982 (aged 17)	Right	Right-arm off-spin
Jordan McGonigle	28 October 1981 (aged 18)	Left	Left-arm orthodox
Niall O'Brien (wk)	8 November 1981 (aged 18)	Left	—
Keith Spelman	1 February 1980 (aged 19)	Left	Left-arm orthodox

Source: ESPNcricinfo

=== Namibia ===
Coach: (South Africa) Tiger Lance

Player	Date of birth	Batting	Bowling style
Jan-Berrie Burger (c)	25 August 1981 (aged 18)	Right	Right-arm leg-spin
Pieter Burger	15 March 1981 (aged 18)	Right	Right-arm medium
Shawn Gericke	6 August 1981 (aged 18)	Right	Right-arm medium
Michael Greeff	22 February 1982 (aged 17)	Left	Left-arm medium
Stefan Ludick	5 April 1981 (aged 18)	Right	Right-arm medium
Benjamin Myburgh	5 March 1980 (aged 19)	Right	Left-arm orthodox
Pollycarpus Negongo	20 May 1980 (aged 19)	Right	Right-arm medium
Johannes Nel	23 December 1981 (aged 18)	Right	—
Wilbur Slabber	2 December 1980 (aged 19)	Right	Right-arm off-spin
Stephan Swanepoel (wk)	2 December 1981 (aged 18)	Right	—
Nicolaas Smith	23 June 1982 (aged 17)	Left	Left-arm orthodox
Burton van Rooi	9 July 1982 (aged 17)	Right	Right-arm medium
Johannes van der Merwe	5 February 1980 (aged 19)	Right	Right-arm off-spin
Tobias Verwey	2 November 1981 (aged 18)	Right	Right-arm leg-spin

Source: ESPNcricinfo

=== Sri Lanka ===
Player	Date of birth	Batting	Bowling style
Malintha Gajanayake (c)	5 October 1980 (aged 19)	Right	Right-arm off-spin
Ian Daniel	17 August 1981 (aged 18)	Right	Right-arm medium
Ranil Dhammika	27 December 1980 (aged 19)	Left	Left-arm orthodox
Mevan Fernando	16 March 1981 (aged 18)	Right	Left-arm orthodox
Akalanka Ganegama	29 March 1981 (aged 18)	Right	Right-arm fast-medium
Umal Irandika	11 November 1980 (aged 19)	Left	Left-arm orthodox
Thilina Kandamby	4 June 1982 (aged 17)	Left	Right-arm leg-spin
Chamara Lasantha	10 March 1981 (aged 18)	Right	Right-arm medium-fast
Kaushal Lokuarachchi	20 May 1982 (aged 17)	Right	Right-arm leg-spin
Jehan Mubarak	10 January 1981 (aged 19)	Left	Right-arm off-spin
Prabath Nissanka	25 October 1980 (aged 19)	Right	Right-arm medium-fast
Rashan Peiris (wk)	21 January 1982 (aged 17)	Right	—
Muthumudalige Pushpakumara	26 September 1981 (aged 18)	Left	Right-arm off-spin
Kaushalya Weeraratne	29 January 1981 (aged 18)	Left	Right-arm medium-fast

Source: ESPNcricinfo

== Sources ==
- ICC Under-19 World Cup 1999/00 – CricketArchive
- Under-19 World Cup 2000 Squads – ESPNcricinfo
