= List of Chittagong Division cricketers =

This is presenting a complete list in alphabetical order of cricketers who have played for Chittagong Division in first-class, List A or Twenty20 matches since the team was formed ahead of the 1999–2000 season for the first National Cricket League (NCL) competition. Complying with other club lists, details are the player's name followed by his years active as a Chittagong player, current players to the end of the 2015–16 season.

Please to note that this list excludes players who appeared for the team in 1999–2000 only. This is because the NCL was not a first-class competition in its opening season. Some players (for example, Ziaur Rashid) played for Chittagong that season and then played in first-class cricket for other teams in later seasons.

== A ==
- Abdullah al Mamun (2009–10 to 2015–16)
- Abdullah Imran (2012–13)
- Abu Newaz (2008–09)
- Aftab Ahmed (1999–2000 to 2013–14)
- Ahsanullah Hasan (2001–02 to 2005–06)
- Akram Khan (1999–2000 to 2004–05)
- Alauddin Babu (2009–10 to 2014–15)
- Ali Akbar (2013–14)
- Ali Arman (2001–02)
- Ameer Khan (2011–12)
- Anisul Hakim (1999–2000 to 2003–04)
- Anisur Rahman (1999–2000 to 2000–01)
- Arif Ahmed (1999–2000 to 2004–05)
- Ariful Hasan (2013–14)
- Arman Hossain (2008–09 to 2009–10)
- Ashiqur Rahman (2001–02 to 2007–08)
- Ashraful Aziz (2011–12)
- Ashraful Hossain (2006–07 to 2008–09)
- Ashraful Islam (2000–01) : he played in a single List A match only
- M. R. Azad (2000–01) : full name and details are unknown, he played in a single List A match only
- Azam Iqbal (1999–2000 to 2004–05)

== B ==
- Belal Hossen (2015–16)

== D ==
- Debabrata Barua Paul (2001–02 to 2003–04)
- Dolar Mahmud (2015–16)

== E ==
- Ehsanul Haque (1999–2000 to 2007–08)
- Elias Sunny (2004–05 to 2009–10)
- Enamul Haque (1999–2000 to 2001–02)
- Enamul Haque (2009–10)

== G ==
- Gazi Alamgir (1999–2000 to 2007–08)
- Gazi Salahuddin (2003–04 to 2011–12)
- Dhiman Ghosh (2004–05 to 2007–08)
- Golam Mortaza (2000–01 to 2002–03)

== H ==
- Habib Muballik (2001–02 to 2004–05)
- Hanif Mohammad (2002–03) : played in a single List A match only
- Harunur Rashid (1999–2000 to 2002–03)

== I ==
- Ibnul Haider (1999–2000 to 2000–01)
- Iftekhar Sajjad (2014–15 to 2015–16)
- Iqbal Hossain (2009–10 to 2012–13)
- Irfan Shukkur (2009–10 to 2015–16)

== J ==
- Jahangir Alam (1999–2000 to 2000–01)
- Jashimuddin (2012–13 to 2015–16)
- Jasimuddin (2001–02)
- Jubair Hossain (2015–16)

== K ==
- Kazi Kamrul Islam (2005–06 to 2012–13)
- Khairuzzaman (2001–02)
- Khurram Manzoor (Pakistan; 2009–10)
- Kuntal Chandra (2004–05)

== M ==
- Mission Das (2009–10)
- Mahbubul Karim (2003–04 to 2014–15)
- Mahmudul Hasan (2008–09 to 2010–11)
- Mahmuduzzaman (2007–08)
- Maksudul Hasan (2011–12 to 2013–14)
- Marshall Ayub (2009–10)
- Masumud Dowla (2000–01 to 2008–09)
- Mazharuddin (2007–08)
- Mehedi Hasan Rana (2013–14 to 2015–16)
- Merajul Hoque (2011–12 to 2015–16)
- Minhajul Abedin (1999–2000 to 2003–04)
- Mobashir Khan (2009–10)
- Mohammad Robin (2005–06)
- Mohammad Saifuddin (2013–14 to 2015–16)
- Mohammad Sukran (2008–09)
- Mohammad Younus (2006–07 to 2014–15)
- Mominul Haque (2009–10 to 2015–16)
- Monirul Haque (2003–04)
- Monirul Islam (1999–2000 to 2009–10)
- Moniruzzaman (2013–14 to 2015–16)
- Monowar Hossain (2012–13 to 2013)
- Mostafa Aziz (2003–04)
- Mouinuddin (2013–14)
- Mozammel Hossain (2005–06)
- Muktar Ali (2008–09)
- Mukhtar Siddique (2003–04)

== N ==
- Nabil Samad (2015–16)
- Nadim Sajjad (2002–03)
- Nadimuddin (2006–07 to 2008–09)
- Naeem Islam (2014–15 to 2015–16)
- Nafees Iqbal (1999–2000 to 2015–16)
- Nasir Hossain (2009–10)
- Nazimuddin (2001–02 to 2015–16)
- Nazmul Islam (2010–11)
- Niaz Morshed (2005–06)
- Noor Hossain (2011–12 to 2014–15)

== O ==
- Obaidul Haque (2003–04)

== R ==
- Raihanuddin Chowdhury (2003–04 to 2011–12)
- Rasel Al Mamun (2013) : played in a single T20 match in 2013 only
- Rashed Khan (2004–05 to 2006–07)
- Rashedur Rahman (2008–09)
- Rezaul Hasan (1999–2000 to 2000–01)
- Rezaul Karim (2005–06 to 2013–14)
- Rubel Hossain (2007–08 to 2009–10)

== S ==
- Sabbir Khan (1999–2000 to 2007–08)
- Sabibul Azam (2003–04)
- Saddam Hossain (2013 to 2013–14)
- Sadid Hossain (2001–02 to 2013)
- Sajal Chowdhury (1999–2000 to 2000–01)
- Sajib Datta (2005–06 to 2007–08)
- Sajjadul Haque (2006–07 to 2015–16)
- Sanwar Hossain (2001–02)
- Saqlain Sajib (2009–10)
- Shafiuddin Ahmed (1999–2000 to 2002–03)
- Shahid Mahmood (1999–2000 to 2000–01)
- Sharif (2001–02) : full name and details are unknown; he played in a single List A match
- Sharifullah (2009–10)
- Shoaib Akhtar (Pakistan; 2009–10)
- Milinda Siriwardana (Sri Lanka; 2012–13)
- Suja Irfan (1999–2000 to 2002–03)
- Sumon Barua (2000–01 to 2001–02)

== T ==
- Tamim Iqbal (2004–05 to 2015–16)
- Tareq Aziz (1999–2000 to 2010–11)
- Tariq Ahmed (2008–09)
- Tasamul Haque (2014–15 to 2015–16)

== U ==
- Uttam Sarkar (2009–10)

== W ==
- Wascoroni Ahmed (2004–05 to 2006–07)
- Waseluddin Ahmed (2002–03 to 2006–07)

== Y ==
- Yasin Arafat (2003–04 to 2014–15)
- Yasir Ali (2012–13 to 2015–16)

== Z ==
- Zakir Hossain (1999–2000 to 2000–01)
