= 1999–2000 NKP Salve Challenger Trophy =

NKP Salve Challenger Trophy 1999/2000
- Date: 10th – 13th February 2000
- Location: Ahmedabad, Gujarat, India
- Result: Won by India Seniors
Teams
India Seniors	India A	India B
Captains
(India) Rahul Dravid	(India) Mohammad Azharuddin	(India) Ajay Jadeja
Most runs
VVS Laxman (201)	Sridharan Sharath (155)	Mohammad Kaif (183)
Most wickets
Sunil Joshi (6) Nikhil Chopra (6)	Amit Bhandari (7)	Reetinder Singh Sodhi (3)

The 6th NKP Salve Challenger Trophy was an Indian domestic cricket tournament that was held in Ahmedabad from 10 February to 13 February 2000. The series involved the domestic and national players from India who were allocated in India Seniors, India A, and India B. India Seniors defeated India A by 84 runs in the final to become the champions of the tournament.

== Squads ==
India Seniors	India A	India B
Rahul Dravid (c); SS Das; VVS Laxman; Jacob Martin; Robin Singh; Anil Kumble; Nikhil Chopra; Sunil Joshi; Sameer Dighe (wk); Harvinder Singh Sodhi; Venkatesh Prasad; Vinod Kambli	Mohammad Azharuddin (c); Nayan Mongia (wk); Jagadeesh Arunkumar; Sridharan Sharath; Virender Sehwag; Murali Kartik; Amit Bhandari; Sanjay Bangar; T Kumaran; Aashish Kapoor; Niraj Patel; Amit Dani	Ajay Jadeja (c); Nikhil Haldipur; Yuvraj Singh; Mohammad Kaif; Anup Dave; JP Yadav; Devendra Bundela; Reetinder Singh Sodhi; Dodda Ganesh; Rashmi Parida; Ajay Ratra (wk); Debashish Mohanty

== Points Table ==
Pos	Team	Pld	W	L	NR	Pts	NRR
1	India Seniors	2	2	0	0	4	0.633
2	India A	2	1	1	0	2	−0.120
3	India B	2	0	2	0	0	−0.516

Source: 'Points Table'

== Matches ==
=== Group stage ===
10 February 2000

India Seniors; 279 (50 overs)	v	India A 227 (47.3 overs)
SS Das 73 (102); Sanjay Bangar 3/54 (10 overs)		Jagadeesh Arunkumar 72 (90); Anil Kumble 3/34 (9 overs)

India Seniors won by 52 runs.
Sardar Patel Stadium, Ahmedabad
Umpires: Krishna Hariharan (IND) and Jasbir Singh (IND)

- India Seniors won the toss and elected to bat.
- Points: India Seniors 2, India A 0

11 February 2000

India B 274/8 (50 overs)	v	India Seniors; 275/4 (48.1 overs)
Mohammad Kaif 90 (106); Nikhil Chopra 3/47 (10 overs)		Vinod Kambli 78* (86); Reetinder Singh Sodhi 2/58 (10 overs)

India Seniors won by 6 wickets.
Sardar Patel Stadium, Ahmedabad
Umpires: Ivaturi Shivram (IND) and V.K Ramaswamy (IND)

- India B won the toss and elected to bat.
- Points: India Seniors 2, India B 0

12 February 2000

India A 295/5 (50 overs)	v	India B 255 (48.5 overs)
Niraj Patel 70* (62); Dodda Ganesh 1/51 (10 overs)		Mohammad Kaif 93 (117); Amit Bhandari 3/52 (9.5 overs)

India A won by 40 runs.
Sardar Patel Stadium, Ahmedabad
Umpires: Jasbir Singh (IND) and Krishna Hariharan (IND)

- India A won the toss and elected to bat.
- Points: India A 2, India B 0

== Final ==
13 February 2000

India Seniors; 320/9 (50 overs)	v	India A 236/9 (50 overs)
SS Das 114 (120); Amit Bhandari 4/53 (10 overs)		Sridharan Sharath 61 (84); Venkatesh Prasad 3/46 (10 overs)

India Seniors won by 84 runs.
Sardar Patel Stadium, Ahmedabad
Umpires: Krishna Hariharan (IND) and V. K. Ramaswamy (umpire) (IND)

- India Seniors won the toss and elected to bat.
- India Seniors became the winners of the NKP Salve Challenger Trophy 1999/2000.
