= 2011 Indian Premier League final =

Coordinates: 13°03′46″N 80°16′46″E

- Event: 2011 Indian Premier League
Chennai Super Kings	Royal Challengers Bangalore
205/5	147/8
20 overs	20 overs
- Chennai Super Kings won by 58 runs
- Date: 28 May 2011
- Venue: M. A. Chidambaram Stadium, Chennai
- Player of the match: Murali Vijay (CSK)
- Umpires: Asad Rauf (Pak); Simon Taufel (Aus)
- Attendance: 49,637

The 2011 Indian Premier League final was a day/night Twenty20 cricket match played between the Chennai Super Kings and the Royal Challengers Bangalore on 28 May 2011 at the M. A. Chidambaram Stadium, Chennai to determine the winner of the 2011 Indian Premier League, an annual professional Twenty20 cricket league in India. It ended as the defending champion Super Kings defeated the Royal Challengers by 58 runs.

The Royal Challengers, captained by Daniel Vettori, topped the group stage table with 19 points in 14 matches, whereas the Super Kings, led by MS Dhoni, stood at the second position with just one point less than the Royal Challengers.

Royal Challengers qualified for the final for the second time in their Indian Premier League History. They previously qualified for the final at 2009 Indian Premier League where they lost to the Deccan Chargers by six runs. On the other hand, it was the third overall and second consecutive final for the Super Kings. They previously qualified for the final at 2008 Indian Premier League where they lost to Rajasthan Royals by three wickets in a last ball thriller. and at the very previous, 2010 Indian Premier League where they got a 22 runs win over the Mumbai Indians to bag their first ever Indian Premier League title.

It was also the first time that a defending champion of the tournament qualify for the final and defend their title. Previous champions Rajasthan Royals (2008) and Deccan Chargers (2009) failed to qualify for the final or defend their title at the next tournament. With this win the Chennai Super Kings also became the first team to have won the IPL on more than one occasion.

== Match ==
=== Summary ===
Winning the toss, Super Kings' captain MS Dhoni elected to bat first. The Super Kings scored 205 runs in 20 overs with a loss of 5 wickets. They scored 159 in their opening partnership before Mike Hussey got out after scoring 63 runs from 45 balls. But the other opener Murali Vijay was the top scorer for his side. He scored 95 runs just missing out a century. Chris Gayle was the best bowler for the Royal Challengers. He took two wickets. In reply, Royal Challengers failed to build a good pressure opening partnership when their opener Chris Gayle got out for a duck in the third ball of their innings. The Royal Challengers couldn't play effectively in the game as they couldn't build partnerships. Their innings came to an end at 147 with loss of eight wickets. Saurabh Tiwary scored unbeaten 42 for the Royal Challengers. Super Kings bowler Ravichandran Ashwin took three wickets for 16 runs. Murali Vijay was awarded the man of the match for his knock of 95.

Despite being at the losing end Royal Challengers' Chris Gayle was named the man of the tournament for scoring 608 runs with bat and taking 8 wickets with ball. He also won the Orange Cap for scoring 608 runs. Lasith Malinga from Mumbai Indians won the Purple Cap for taking 28 wickets. The Fly Kingfisher Fair Play Award was again won by the Chennai Super Kings for topping the fair-play table. Iqbal Abdullah of Kolkata Knight Riders was awarded the Emerging Player of the Year award.

=== Scorecard ===
On-field umpires: Asad Rauf (Pak) and Simon Taufel (Aus)

Third umpire: Kumar Dharmasena (SL)

Reserve umpire: Krishnaraj Srinath (Ind)

Match referee: Roshan Mahanama (SL)

Toss: Super Kings elected to bat first

Result: Super Kings won by 58 runs

League impact: Super Kings won the 2011 Indian Premier League

Chennai Super Kings innings
Batsmen	Method of Dismissal	Runs	Balls	Strike rate
Michael Hussey	c Mithun b Syed Mohammed	63	45	140.00
Murali Vijay	c Vettori b Aravind	95	52	182.69
MS Dhoni† (c)	c Kohli b Aravind	22	13	169.23
Suresh Raina	b Gayle	8	5	160.00
Albie Morkel	c Kohli b Gayle	2	4	50.00
S Badrinath	not out	0	0	0.00
Dwayne Bravo	not out	6	1	600.00
Did not bat	Wriddhiman Saha, R Ashwin, Doug Bollinger, Shadab Jakati			
Extras	(lb 7, w 2)	9	—	
Total	(20 overs, 10.25 runs per over)	205/5	—	

Fall of wickets: 1-159 (Hussey, 14.5 overs), 2-188 (M Vijay, 18.1 overs), 3-188 (Dhoni, 18.2 overs), 4-199 (A Morkel, 19.4 overs), 5-199 (Raina, 19.5 overs)

Royal Challengers Bangalore bowling
Bowler	Overs	Maidens	Runs	Wickets	Economy
Zaheer Khan	4	0	30	0	7.50
Sreenath Aravind	3	0	39	2	13.00
Chris Gayle	4	0	34	2	8.50
Syed Mohammed	3	0	39	1	13.00
Daniel Vettori (c)	4	0	34	0	8.50
Abhimanyu Mithun	2	0	22	0	11.00

Royal Challengers Bangalore innings
Batsmen	Method of Dismissal	Runs	Balls	Strike rate
Mayank Agarwal	b Ashwin	10	5	200.00
Chris Gayle	c Dhoni† b Ashwin	0	3	0.00
Virat Kohli	lbw b Raina	35	32	109.37
AB de Villiers	lbw b Jakati	18	12	150.00
Luke Pomersbach	c & b Jakati	2	3	66.66
Saurabh Tiwary	not out	42	34	123.52
Daniel Vettori (c)	c & b Ashwin	0	1	0.00
Abhimanyu Mithun	c Bollinger b Bravo	11	8	137.50
Zaheer Khan	c Hussey b Bollinger	21	21	100.00
Syed Mohammad	not out	2	2	100.00
Did not bat	Sreenath Aravind			
Extras	(b 2, lb 2, nb 1, w 1)	6		
Total	(20 overs, 7.35 runs per over)	147/8		

Fall of wickets: 1-0 (Gayle, 0.3 overs), 2-16 (Agarwal, 2.3 overs), 3-48 (de Villiers, 6.3 overs), 4-62 (Pomersbach, 8.3 overs), 5-69 (Kohli, 9.6 overs), 6-70 (Vettori, 10.2 overs), 7-92 (A Mithun, 12.6 overs), 8-130 (Z Khan, 18.4 overs)

Chennai Super Kings bowling
Bowler	Overs	Maidens	Runs	Wickets	Economy
R Ashwin	4	0	16	3	4.00
Albie Morkel	3	0	24	0	8.00
Doug Bollinger	3	0	28	1	9.33
Shadab Jakati	4	0	21	2	5.25
Suresh Raina	4	0	39	1	9.75
Dwayne Bravo	2	0	15	1	7.50
