= Ludik =

Ludik is a surname. Notable people with the surname include:

- Hugo Ludik (born 1983), Namibian cricketer and musician
- Louis Ludik (born 1986), South African rugby union player
- Milan Ludík (born 1992), Czech badminton player
- Stefan Ludik (born 1981), Namibian musician, television personality, actor, and former cricketer
