= Anisul =

Anisul is a Bangladeshi masculine given name that may refer to the following notable people:

- Anisul Hakim (born 1975), Bangladeshi cricketer
- Anisul Huq (disambiguation), multiple people
- Anisul Islam Emon (born 1994), Bangladeshi cricketer
- Anisul Islam Mahmud (born 1947), Bangladeshi Minister of Environment and Forest
- Anisul Islam Mondal (born 1966), Bangladeshi politician
