= Bakas (surname) =

Bakas is a surname. Notable people with the surname include:

- Amalia Bakas (1897–1979), Greek singer and performer
- Rifaiz Bakas (born 1982), Dutch cricketer
