= Peter Shields =

Peter Shields may refer to:

- Peter Joseph Shields (1862–1962), helped found the University of California, Davis and superior court judge for the State of California
- Peter Shields (footballer) (born 1960), Scottish football player
- Peter Shields (cricketer) (born 1979), Irish cricketer

See also

- Pete Shields (1891–1961), American baseball player
