= Suja =

Suja can refer to:

- Šuja, a village in Žilina Region, Slovakia
- Sujā, the queen of the devas in Hinduism
- Suja (name), a given name and surname
