= Geldenhuys =

Geldenhuys is a surname. Notable people with the surname include:

- Boy Geldenhuys (born 1941), South African politician
- Burger Geldenhuys (born 1956), South African rugby union player
- Hendrik Geldenhuys (born 1983), Namibian cricketer
- Johannes Geldenhuys (1935–2018), South African military commander
- Preller Geldenhuys (born 1943), Rhodesian-born South African pilot and author
- Quintin Geldenhuys (born 1981), South Africa-born Italian rugby union player
- Ross Geldenhuys (born 1983), South African rugby union footballer
