= Sabibul Azam =

Bangladeshi cricketer

Personal information
- Born: Bangladesh
- Batting: Right-handed
- Role: Batsman
- Source: ESPNcricinfo, 30 June 2019

Sabibul Azam is a First class cricketer from Bangladesh who made his debut for Chittagong Division in 2003/04 with little success, playing in three matches. His highest score of 15 came against Barisal Division.

== See also ==
- List of Chittagong Division cricketers
