= DY Patil Stadium =

Sports venue in Navi Mumbai, India

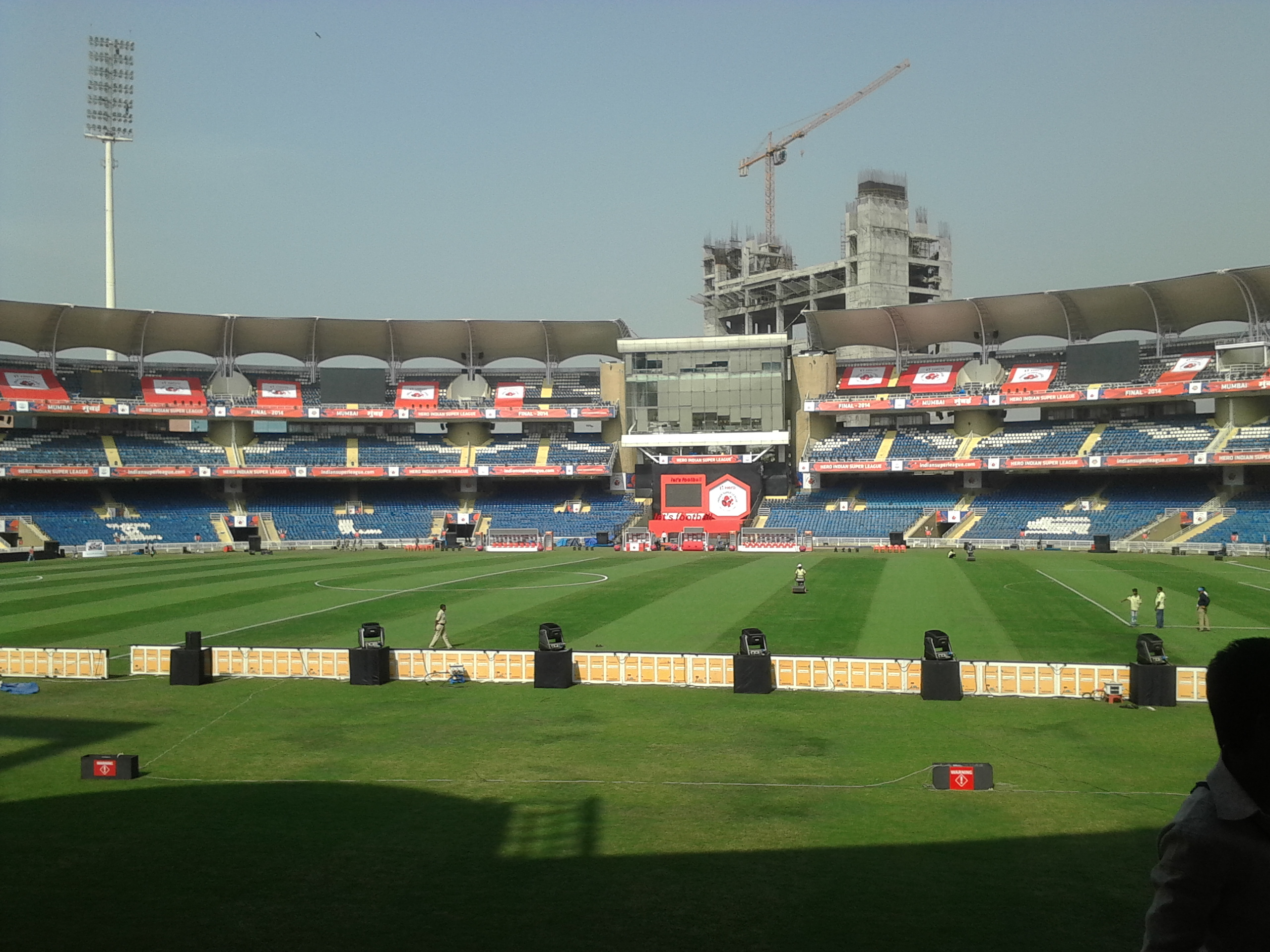
- Interactive map of DY Patil Stadium

Ground information
- Location: Nerul, Navi Mumbai, Maharashtra, India
- Country: India
- Coordinates: 19°2′31″N 73°1′36″E
- Establishment: 2008
- Capacity: 45,300
- Owner: Dnyandeo Yashwantrao Patil
- Operator: DY Patil Sports Academy
- Tenants: Board of Control for Cricket in India (2023–present); Mumbai City FC (selected matches); Mumbai Cricket Association; Deccan Chargers; Mumbai Indians; Mumbai Indians; Pune Warriors India
- Website: https://dypatilstadium.com/
- End names
- Media End; Pavilion End

International information
- Only women's Test: 14–16 December 2023: India v England
- First women's ODI: 20 October 2025: Bangladesh v Sri Lanka
- Last women's ODI: 2 November 2025: India v South Africa
- First women's T20I: 9 December 2022: India v Australia
- Last women's T20I: 19 December 2024: India v West Indies
- As of 2 November 2025; Source: ESPNcricinfo

The DY Patil Stadium is a multi-purpose sports arena in Navi Mumbai, Maharashtra, India. Owned by Dnyandeo Yashwantrao Patil, it is based in the DY Patil Sports Academy in Nerul. It is primarily a cricket stadium, though it is sometimes used for football, music concerts and other events.

== Structure ==
Designed by Indian architect Hafeez Contractor, the stadium has a capacity of 45,300 that makes it the tenth -largest cricket stadium in India. The stadium makes use of bucket seats and cantilever gull wing roofs that eliminate the need for columns. This provides the spectators with an unobstructed view of the match from any place within the stands. On the other hand, the stadium has a 120-person capacity air-conditioned media center. The upper level of the viewing galleries has 60 private corporate boxes.

== Notable events ==
It was inaugurated on 4 March 2008 as the home ground of Indian Premier League franchise Mumbai Indians. It has hosted the inaugural IPL season's final in 2008 and the 2010 season final. In 2022 season the arena hosted number of games.

The seventh ODI between India and Australia during Australia's 2009 tour of India was to be played on 11 November 2009, but was cancelled due to heavy rain.

The stadium has also hosted international football matches during the 2017 FIFA U17 World Cup, 2022 FIFA U17 Women's World Cup, 2022 AFC Women's Asian Cup and the 2023–24 AFC Champions League.

The arena is hosting games of the Women's Premier League since 4 March 2023. It has hosted the opening game-ceremony and scheduled to host final match.

On 2 November, 2025, India defeated South Africa by 52 runs at this venue to win their maiden Women's Cricket World Cup title.

== Local cricket tournaments ==
Times Shield

Mumbai Cricket Association Times Shield matches are played at DY Patil. The Dr. DY Patil Sports Academy organised India's first official T20 tournament in 2005. The tournament is hosted annually at the stadium and includes:

- D.Y. Patil 'A'
- D.Y. Patil 'B'
- Mumbai Customs
- Jain Irrigation
- Indian Oil
- Central Railway
- Income Tax
- BPCL
- Reliance 1
- CAG
- Indian Navy
- Bank of Baroda
- Canara Bank
- Air India
- RBI
- Western Railway

== Concerts ==
In December 2015, Hardwell was invited by Shailendra Singh to perform for the World's Biggest Guestlist event at the venue, waiving his personal appearance fee in favour of donating all of the proceeds to charity. Guestlist4Good opened 75,000 spots on Hardwell's personal guestlist for over 125,000 pre-registered fans, while also accepting pledges and donations to provide educational aid for 2,800 children from age 8 to 18.

On May 10th 2017, Justin Bieber performed here as part of his Purpose World Tour.

In December 2017, the World's Biggest Guestlist festival, 2-day event was held, organised by Shailendra Singh and Guestlist4Good, with Hardwell, W&W, Nucleya, Adnan Sami, Shaan, Mithoon, KillTheBuzz, Suyano, Aditi Singh Sharma, Armaan Malik performing. 75,000 fans were in attendance on the second day, United we Are by Hardwell, and the event supported the education of 100,000 underprivileged Indian children through Magic Bus.

On 16 November 2019, Dua Lipa and Katy Perry (plus Indian acts: The Local Train, Ritviz, Amit Trivedi, etc.) headlined the One Plus Music Festival.

On 15 December 2019, U2 performed a concert in the stadium as part of the Joshua Tree Tour.

On 25 November 2023, the American rapper, 50 Cent, performed here in his The Final Lap Tour.

British rock band Coldplay performed two concerts on 18, 19 January 2025 as part of their Music of the Spheres World Tour. Due to the overwhelming demand for tickets, an additional show was added on 21 January 2025.

On 14 March 2025, Martin Garrix performed the World’s Biggest Holi Celebration. The event had a guest appearance by Arijit Singh during Garrix’s finale, the live video of which was featured in Garrix's Angels for Each Other music video.

On 3 May 2025, A. R. Rahman performed at the DY Patil Stadium as part of The Wonderment Tour.

== World record ==
The Guinness World Records lists the "largest health awareness lesson (single venue)" as 51,861 participants, achieved by Nanasaheb Dharmadhikari Pratishthan at the Stadium on 20 December 2013.

== See also ==
- List of stadiums by capacity
- List of association football stadiums by capacity
- List of cricket grounds by capacity

Preceded by Estadio Charrúa; Montevideo	FIFA U-17 Women's World Cup; Final Venue; 2022	Succeeded by Félix Sánchez Olympic Stadium; Santo Domingo
