= Chandra Kumara (cricketer) =

Sri Lankan cricketer (born 1983)

Personal information
- Full name: Pahalage Don Gamini Chandra Kumara
- Born: 6 May 1983 (age 43); Colombo, Sri Lanka
- Source: ESPNcricinfo, 15 December 2016

Chandra Kumara, also known as Gamini Chandrakumara, (born 6 May 1983) is a Sri Lankan cricketer. He played 49 first-class and 44 List A matches between 2001 and 2011. He was also part of Sri Lanka's squad for the 2002 Under-19 Cricket World Cup.
