= 2010 Indian Premier League final =

Coordinates: 19°2′31″N 73°1′36″E

- Event: 2010 Indian Premier League
Chennai Super Kings	Mumbai Indians
168/5	146/9
20 overs	20 overs
- Chennai Super Kings won by 22 runs
- Date: 25 April 2010
- Venue: DY Patil Stadium, Navi Mumbai
- Player of the match: Suresh Raina (CSK)
- Umpires: Rudi Koertzen (SA); Simon Taufel (Aus)
- Attendance: 55,836

The 2010 Indian Premier League final was a day/night Twenty20 cricket match played between the Chennai Super Kings and the Mumbai Indians on 25 April 2010 at the DY Patil Stadium, Navi Mumbai to determine the winner of the 2010 Indian Premier League, an annual professional Twenty20 cricket league in India. It ended as the Super Kings defeated the Indians by 22 runs.

The Indians, captained by Sachin Tendulkar, topped the group stage table with 10 wins in 14 matches, whereas the Super Kings, led by Mahendra Singh Dhoni, stood at the third position with seven wins in 14. They had defeated the Royal Challengers Bangalore and the Deccan Chargers respectively in the semi-finals.

Mumbai Indians qualified for the first time in their Indian Premier League history while it was the second time for Chennai Super Kings in three years. Super Kings qualified for the final at 2008 Indian Premier League where they lost to Rajasthan Royals by three wickets in a last ball thriller.

== Route to the Final ==
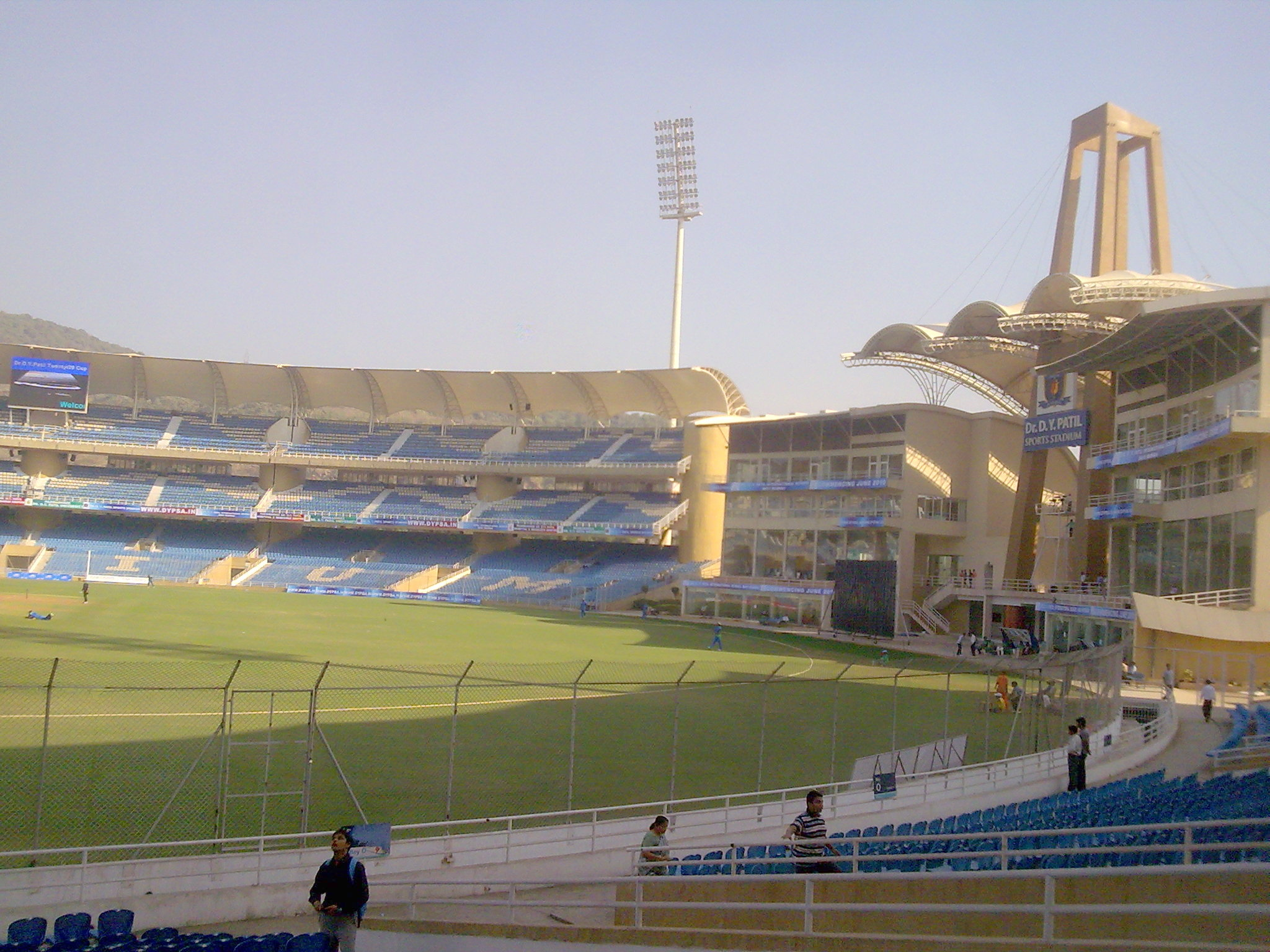
The venue of the Indian Premier League final was DY Patil Stadium which was also the venue of the semifinals and third place playoff.

=== Group stage ===
The Super Kings' campaign started with a loss against the defending champion Deccan Chargers. They went on to win their next two matches against Kolkata Knight Riders and Delhi Daredevils respectively, but then lost four consecutive matches against Kings XI Punjab, Royal Challengers, Indians and Rajasthan Royals. Though the loss against Kings XI came in a Super-Over after the match ended in a tie. From then they went on to win three consecutive matches against Royal Challengers, Indians and Royals, but they again lost to Chargers at their next match. However they won two of their last three matches including their last match of group stage which led them to the knockout stage.

While on the other hand campaign for Mumbai Indians was like a bed of roses. They won seven out of their first with the only defeat coming in their third match against the Royal Challengers. But after this start they won three and lost three of their last six matches. However 20 points from 10 wins in 14 matches were more than enough for them to be the points table topper as their closest team at the points table, Deccan Chargers had 16 points in their bag.

The two teams faced each other in two matches of the group stage, Indians and Super Kings won one each. Both the Super Kings and Indians played at the DY Patil Stadium for the first time in the finals.

Group stage procession
Team	Group matches													
Team	1	2	3	4	5	6	7	8	9	10	11	12	13	14
Mumbai Indians	2	4	4	6	8	10	12	14	14	14	16	18	20	20
Chennai Super Kings	0	2	4	4	4	4	4	6	8	10	10	12	12	14

Won	Lost

Note: The points at the end of each group match are listed.
Note: Click on the points to see the summary for the match.

=== Semi-final ===
The Indians played the fourth placed team Royal Challengers in the first semi-final. The Indians won the toss and decided to bat first. The Indians didn't have a good opening partnership. Opener and skipper Sachin Tendulkar was dismissed at 11 runs. The other opener Shikhar Dhawan got out at 29. But middle order batsmen Saurabh Tiwary and Ambati Rayudu scored 52 and 40 respectively. Lower order batsman Kieron Pollard scored an unbeaten cameo of 33 from 13 balls to take the score to 184 for 5 in 20 overs. Dale Steyn took two wickets for 43 runs. In reply Royal Challengers were never comfortable in chasing down Indians' 184. They lost wickets in regular break and could finally score 149 for 9 wickets falling short by 35 runs. Ross Taylor scored the highest 31 runs for the Royal Challengers. Kieron Pollard took three wickets for 17 runs. Mumbai won the match by 35 runs and qualified for the final while Royal Challengers were eliminated from the tournament as a result of this match. Royal Challengers also got a place in the third-place playoff match. Kieron Pollard was named the man of the match.

In the second semi-final, Super Kings played the Chargers. The Super Kings won the toss and elected to bat first, But they made slow star from the starting also they lost their first three wickets in 29 runs. But later on contributions of 37 and 30 from middle order batsmen Subramaniam Badrinath and skipper Dhoni rescued Super Kings and helped to build up their innings. In later part of the innings a cameo of 24 runs from Srikkanth Anirudha helped Super Kings post a total of 142 for 7 on the board. Ryan Harris took three wickets for 29 runs. To chase down 142, the chargers started very slow. They lost their first wicket at 19 runs with skipper Adam Gilchrist departing after scoring 15 runs. Then they started losing wickets on regular interval. With this going on the Chargers lost all their wickets for 104 run in 19.2 overs. Andrew Symonds scored 23 runs which was the highest in Chargers innings. Super Kings bowler Doug Bollinger took four wickets for 13 runs in 4 over and was also named the man of the match. Chennai won the match by 38 runs and advanced to the final while Chargers were eliminated from the tournament and had to play the third-place playoff where their opponent was the Royal Challengers.

== Match ==
=== Match officials ===
- On-field umpires: Rudi Koertzen (SA) and Simon Taufel (Aus)
- Third umpire: Sundaram Ravi (Ind)
- Reserve umpire: Sameer Bandekar (USA)
- Match referee: Srinivasaraghavan Venkataraghavan (Ind)
- Toss: Chennai Super Kings elected to bat
- Result: Chennai Super Kings won by 22 runs
- League impact: Chennai Super Kings won the 2010 Indian Premier League title

=== Summary ===
Winning the toss, Super Kings' captain MS Dhoni opted to bat first. The Super Kings scored 168 runs in 20 overs with a loss of five wickets. Batting at number three, Suresh Raina top scored for the Super Kings with an unbeaten 57 runs off 35 balls. Skipper Dhoni scored 22 and a late cameo of 15 from Albie Morkel helped Super Kings to reach the total. Indians' bowler Dilhara Fernando took two wickets for 23 runs. The Indians failed to build a good opening partnership with their opener Shikhar Dhawan, got out at one run. However partnership of 67 runs in second wicket showed light of hope to the Indians. But after the end of that partnership all hope went down for the Indians. Skipper Sachin Tendulkar scored 48 runs and a 27 off 10 balls cameo from Kieron Pollard wasn't enough to reach the target of 169. They scored 146 in the allotted 20 overs with a loss of nine wickets. Shadab Jakati got two wickets and Muttiah Muralitharan, Doug Bollinger, Suresh Raina, Albie Morkel got one wicket each. Super Kings won the match by 22 runs to win their first Indian Premier League Title. Suresh Raina was awarded the man of the match for his knock of unbeaten 57 and a wicket. This match raised eyebrows as to why Kieron Pollard was held back down the order when he could have higher up the order when the target was within reach.

=== Scorecard ===
Chennai Super Kings innings
Batsmen	Method of Dismissal	Runs	Balls	Strike rate
Murali Vijay	c Tiwary b Fernando	26	19	136.84
Matthew Hayden	c Rayudu† b Pollard	17	31	54.83
Suresh Raina	not out	57	35	162.85
S Badrinath	c Malinga b Fernando	14	11	127.27
MS Dhoni† (c)	c Fernando b Khan	22	15	146.66
Albie Morkel	run out (Rayudu†)	15	6	250.00
S Anirudha	not out	6	3	200.00
Did not bat	R Ashwin, Shadab Jakati, Doug Bollinger, Muttiah Muralitharan			
Extras	(lb 3, w 8)	11		
Total	(20 overs, 8.4 runs per over)	168/5		

Fall of wickets: 1-44 (Vijay, 7.2 overs), 2-47 (Hayden, 8.4 overs), 3-67 (Badrinath, 11.2 overs), 4-139 (Dhoni, 17.1 overs), 5-157 (Albie Morkel, 19.3 overs

Mumbai Indians bowling
Bowler	Overs	Maidens	Runs	Wickets	Economy
Harbhajan Singh	4	0	30	0	7.50
Lasith Malinga	4	0	33	0	8.25
Zaheer Khan	4	0	34	1	8.50
Dilhara Fernando	4	0	23	2	5.75
Kieron Pollard	4	0	45	1	11.25

Mumbai Indians innings
Batsmen	Method of Dismissal	Runs	Balls	Strike rate
Shikhar Dhawan	c Dhoni† b Bollinger	0	8	0.00
Sachin Tendulkar (c)	c Vijay b Jakati	48	45	106.66
Abhishek Nayar	run out (Dhoni†)	27	26	103.84
Harbhajan Singh	lbw b Raina	1	2	50.00
Ambati Rayudu†	run out (Vijay)	21	14	150.00
Saurabh Tiwary	c Raina b Jakati	0	2	0.00
JP Duminy	c Jakati b Muralitharan	6	7	85.71
Kieron Pollard	c Hayden b Morkel	27	10	270.00
Zaheer Khan	run out (Ashwin)	1	3	33.33
Lasith Malinga	not out	1	1	100.00
Dilhara Fernando	not out	2	2	100.00
Extras	(b 1, lb 6, w 5)	12		
Total	(20 overs, 7.3 runs per over)	146/9		

Fall of wickets: 1-1 (Dhawan, 1.4 overs), 2-67 (Nayar, 11.2 overs), 3-73 (H Singh, 11.6 overs), 4-99 (Tendulkar, 14.2 overs), 5-100 (Tiwary, 14.5 overs), 6-114 (Duminy, 16.6 overs), 7-142 (Rayudu, 18.5 overs), 8-142 (Pollard, 18.6 overs), 9-143 (Z Khan, 19.3 overs)

Chennai Super Kings bowling
Bowler	Overs	Maidens	Runs	Wickets	Economy
R Ashwin	4	1	24	0	6.00
Doug Bollinger	4	0	31	1	7.75
Albie Morkel	3	0	20	1	6.66
Muttiah Muralitharan	4	0	17	1	4.25
Shadab Jakati	3	0	26	2	8.66
Suresh Raina	2	0	21	1	10.50
