= Suja (name) =

Suja can be both a given name and a surname. Notable people with this name include:

== As a given name ==
- Suja Irfan, Bangladeshi cricketer
- Suja Karthika, Indian actress and dancer
- Suja Khondokar (1941–1997), Bangladeshi actor
- Suja Varunee, Indian actress

== As a surname ==
- Jakub Suja (born 1998), Slovak ice hockey player
- Mostafa Rashidi Suja (1953–2018), Bangladeshi politician
- Rao Suja (1439–1515), ruler of the Kingdom of Marwar
