= Colin Maiden Park =

Sports ground in Auckland, New Zealand

Coordinates: 36.8809°S 174.8481°E

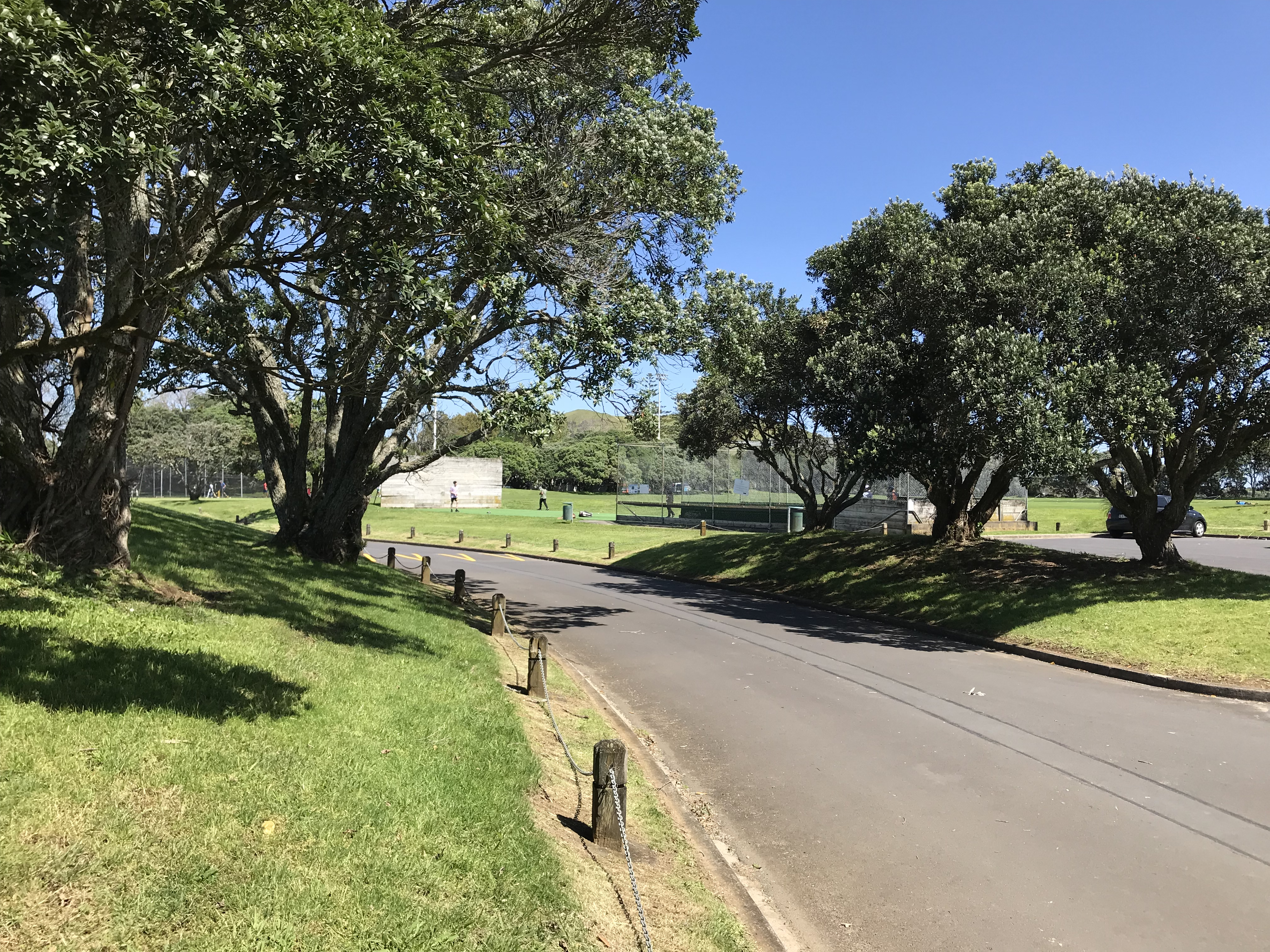
Colin Maiden Park in 2021

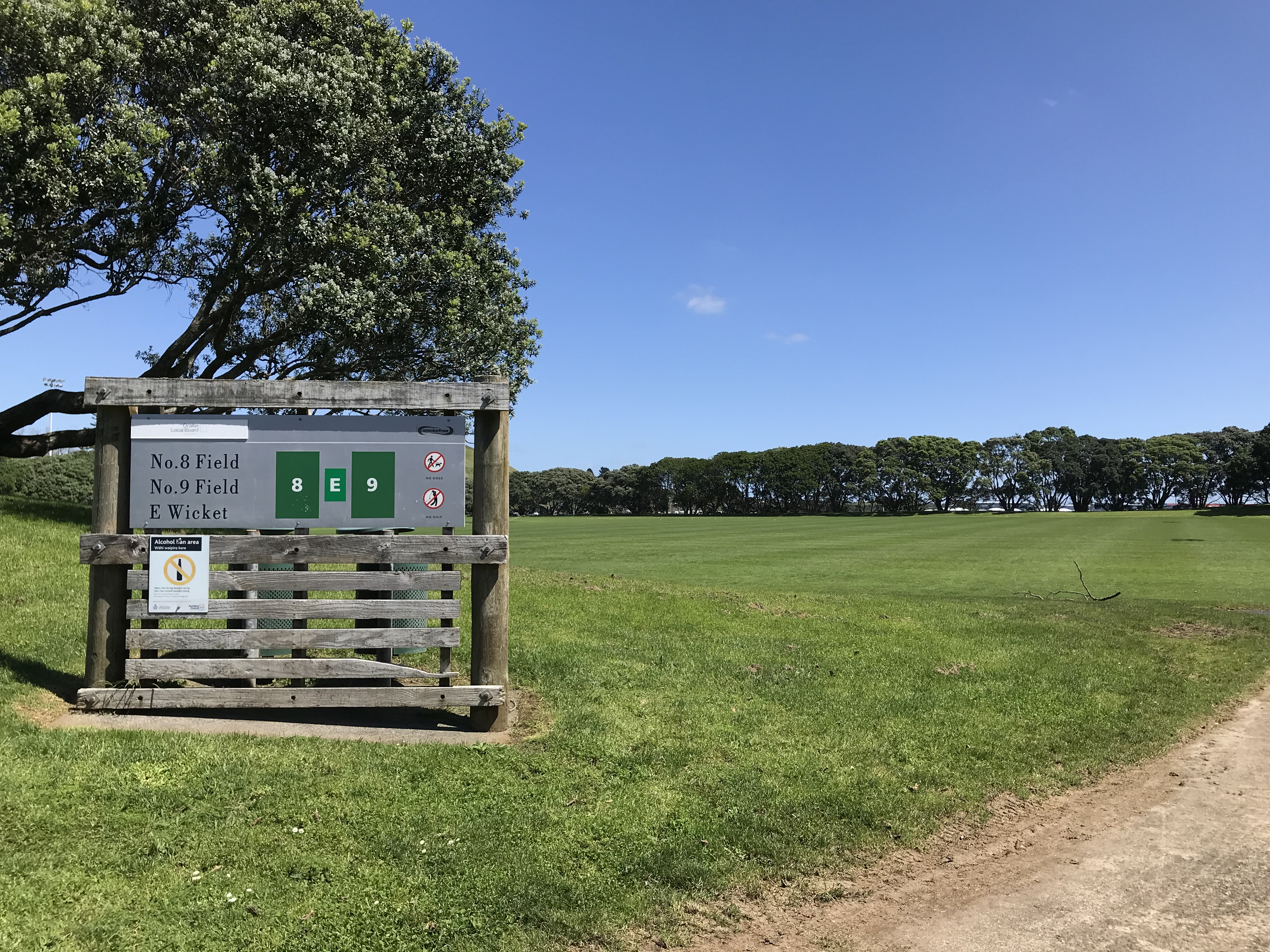
Cricket pitches at Colin Maiden Park in 2021

Colin Maiden Park is a New Zealand sports complex in the Auckland suburb of Glen Innes, about 10 kilometres south-east of the Auckland CBD. It is named in honour of Sir Colin Maiden, vice-chancellor of the University of Auckland from 1971 to 1994.

There are three grass pitch cricket grounds and other sporting facilities in the park. The main ground, which has a capacity of 4,000, is the home of University RFC and Auckland University CC, and is one of the home grounds for the Auckland cricket team. The main cricket ground began to be used for first-class cricket in 1999, and as of November 2023 it has staged 29 of Auckland's first-class and 20 of Auckland's one-day matches. Auckland played the final of the Ford Trophy there in 2009–10 and 2014–15.

In 2014 the Auckland council took over the park as part of a condition of sale between the university and the council. The purchase ensures the 20-hectare parkland and sports field complex remain in public ownership. In 2025 further development of the cricket facilities was announced, in order to allow the Auckland cricket team to establish the ground as its base.
