= Wascoroni Ahmed =

Bangladeshi cricketer (born 1984)

Personal information
- Born: July 1, 1984 (age 42); Comilla, Bangladesh
- Batting: Right-handed
- Bowling: Right-arm fast-medium

Career statistics
Competition	First-class	List A
Matches	11	8
Runs scored	242	45
Batting average	22	15
100s/50s	0/1	0/0
Top score	88	14*
Balls bowled	1,594	367
Wickets	29	11
Bowling average	32.24	26.90
5 wickets in innings	2	1
10 wickets in match	0	0
Best bowling	8/69	5/27
Catches/stumpings	2/–	2/–
- Source: CricketArchive, 30 December 2021

Wascoroni Ahmed is a first-class and List A cricketer from Bangladesh. He was born on 1 July 1984 in Comilla, Chittagong and is a right-handed batsman and right arm fast medium bowler. Sometimes referred to on scoresheets by his nickname Palash, he made his debut for Chittagong Division in 2004/05 and played through the 2006/07 season. He has twice taken 5 wickets in an innings, with a best of 8 for 69 against Rajshahi Division. His only first-class fifty, 88, came against Barisal Division. He took 5 for 27 against Rajshahi Division in a one-day game.
