= Ian Postman =

South African cricketer (born 1982)

Personal information
- Born: 27 September 1982 (age 44)
- Source: ESPNcricinfo, 13 December 2016

Ian Postman (born 27 September 1982) is a South African cricketer. He played one first-class and two List A matches between 2003 and 2004. He was also part of South Africa's squad for the 2002 Under-19 Cricket World Cup.
