= 2008 Indian Premier League final =

Cricket match

Coordinates: 19°2′31″N 73°1′36″E

- Event: 2008 Indian Premier League
Chennai Super Kings	Rajasthan Royals
163/5	164/7
20 overs	20 overs
- Rajasthan Royals won by 3 wickets
- Date: 1 June 2008
- Venue: DY Patil Stadium, Navi Mumbai
- Player of the match: Yusuf Pathan (RR)
- Umpires: Billy Bowden (NZ); Rudi Koertzen (SA)
- Attendance: 55,345

The 2008 Indian Premier League final was a day/night Twenty20 cricket match played between the Rajasthan Royals and the Chennai Super Kings on 1 June 2008 at the DY Patil Stadium, Navi Mumbai to determine the winner of the 2008 Indian Premier League, a professional Twenty20 cricket league in India. It ended as the Royals defeated the Super Kings by three wickets.

The Royals, captained by Shane Warne, topped the group stage table, whereas the Super Kings, led by Mahendra Singh Dhoni, stood at the third position. They had defeated the Delhi Daredevils and the Kings XI Punjab respectively in the semi-finals.

Winning the toss, Royals' captain Shane Warne opted to field first. The Super Kings scored 163 runs in 20 overs with a loss of 5 wickets. Batting at number three, Suresh Raina top scored for the Super Kings with 43 runs. Royals' bowler Yusuf Pathan took three wickets for 22 runs. The Royals failed to build a good opening partnership. However, due to contributions from the middle order, it reached the winning total in the last ball and earned the 2008 Indian Premier League title. Pathan, who was the best performer for the Royals with both bat and ball, was named the man of the match.

== Route to the final ==
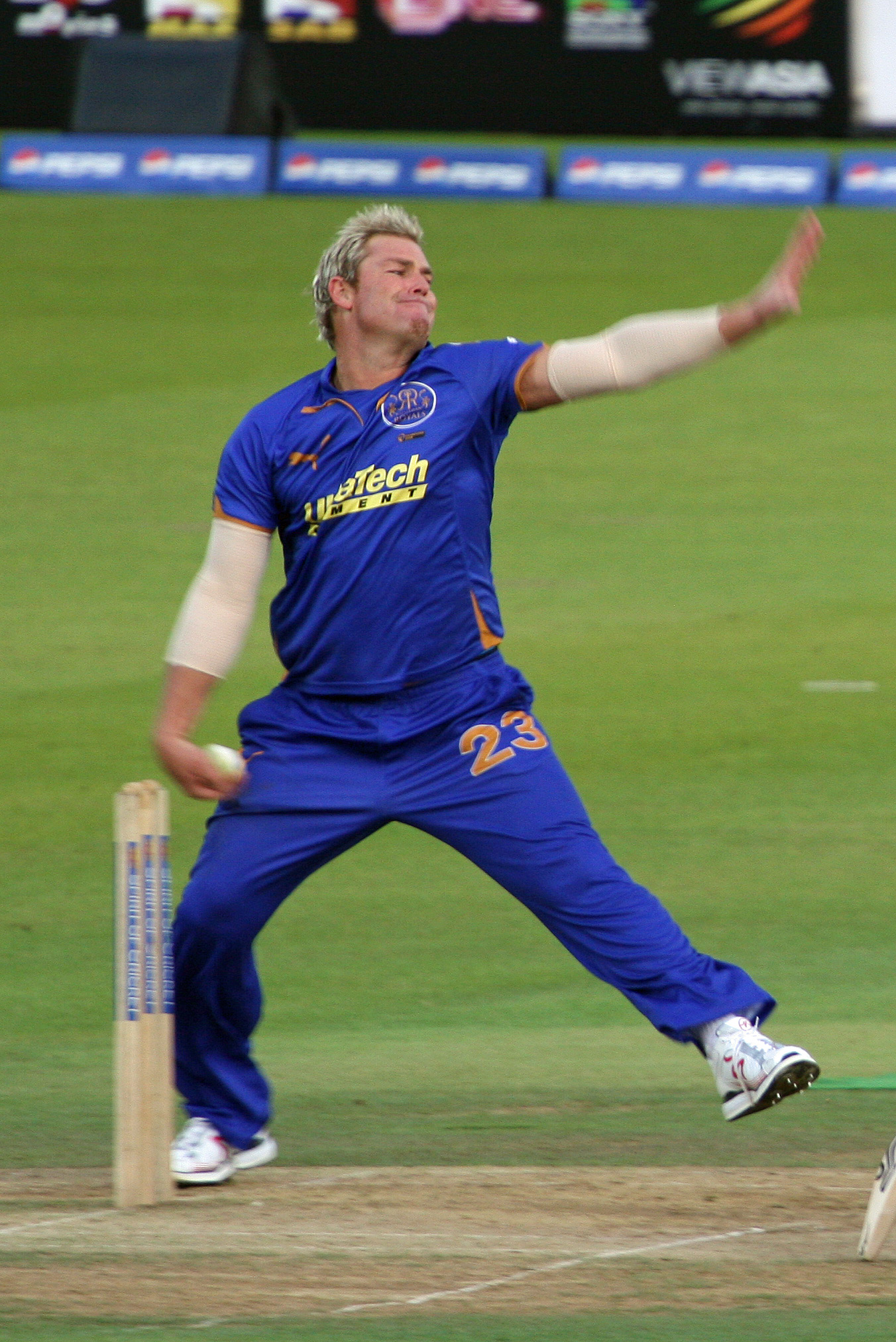
After his teammate Sohail Tanvir, Warne was the second highest wicket-taker of the tournament. He served both as a captain and a coach for the Royals.

=== Group stage ===
The Super Kings started its campaign with four consecutive wins, but lost its next three matches to the Daredevils, the Royals and the Deccan Chargers. It qualified for the semifinals after winning four of its last seven league matches. The Royals lost its first match in the group stage to the Daredevils. However, it won all of its next five matches. Then, it suffered a defeat against the Mumbai Indians, but went on to win its next six matches. It lost the last group stage match against the Kings XI.

The two teams faced each other in two matches of the group stage, both of which were won by the Royals. The Royals had played a match in the tournament before at the DY Patil Stadium; it lost the match by seven wickets. The Super Kings played at the stadium for the first time in the finals.

Group stage procession
Team	Group matches													
Team	1	2	3	4	5	6	7	8	9	10	11	12	13	14
Chennai Super Kings	2	4	6	8	8	8	8	10	12	12	14	14	14	16
Rajasthan Royals	0	2	4	6	8	10	10	12	14	16	18	20	22	22

Won	Lost

Note: The points at the end of each group match are listed.
Note: Click on the points to see the summary for the match.

=== Semifinals ===
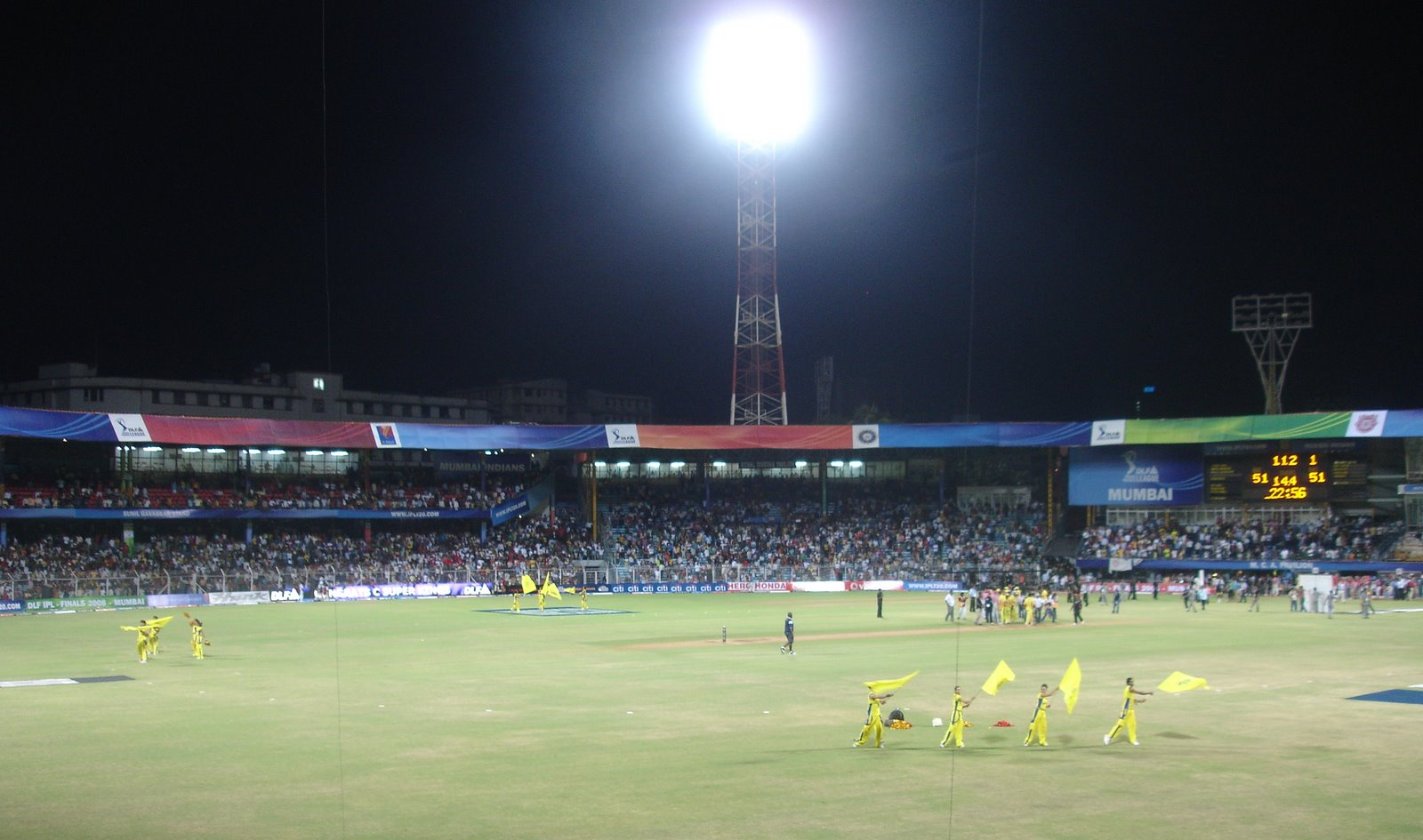
The Super Kings players celebrating after winning the semi-final.

The Royals played the Daredevils in the first semi-final. The Daredevils won the toss and decided to field first. The Royals got an opening partnership of 65 runs. Its middle-order batsmen Shane Watson and Yusuf Pathan scored 52 and 45 runs respectively to help it amass 192 runs for the loss of 9 wickets. Batting second, the Daredevils lost its first five batsmen for just 55 runs. Tillakaratne Dilshan top-scored for the Daredevils with 33 runs. The Daredevils was bowled out in the 17th over for just 87 runs, and gave its counterpart a 105-run victory. Watson, who took 3/10, had the best bowling figures for the Royals, and was awarded the man of the match for his all-round performance.

In the second semi-final, Super Kings played the Kings XI. The Kings XI won the toss and elected to bat first, but its top six batsman failed and only one of them reached double figures. However, due to significant contributions from the lower-order, Punjab managed to reach a total of 112/8. Super Kings fast bowler Manpreet Gony took 3 wickets by conceding just 14 runs. In reply, Super Kings lost its first wicket when Vidyut Sivaramakrishnan were dismissed for 6 runs. However, both Parthiv Patel and Suresh Raina scored a half century each and took the Super Kings to the target with 31 balls to spare. The Super Kings won the match by nine wickets.

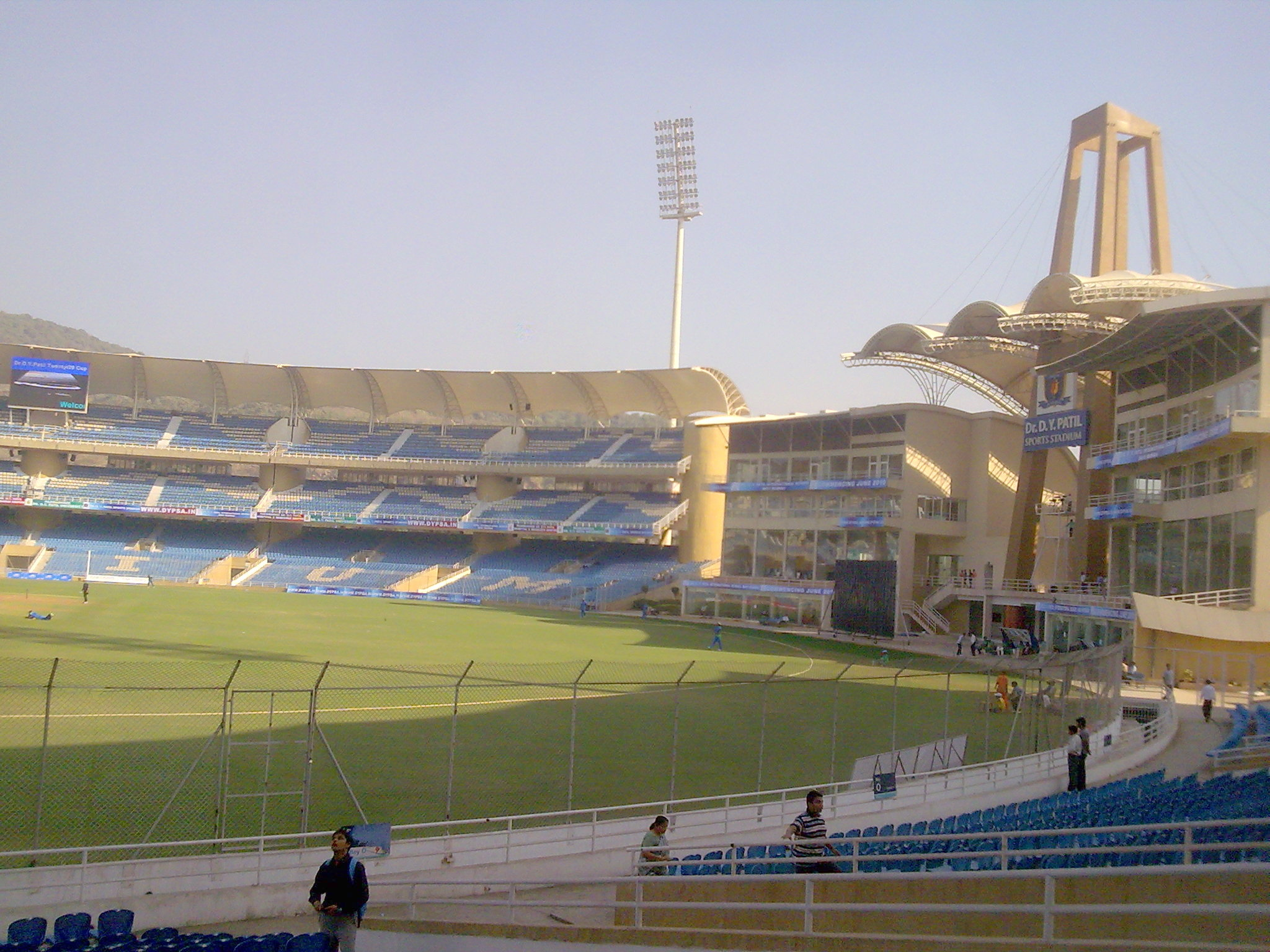
The venue of the final was shifted from Wankhede Stadium to DY Patil Stadium because of larger capacity.

== Buildup ==
The match was hosted by Mumbai because the franchise owner of the Mumbai Indians placed the highest bid for acquisition, which was US$111.9 million. Before the match, ESPNcricinfo assistant editor Nagraj Gollapudi identified the Royals as the most likely winner. Despite being seen as the underdogs, the Royals finished at the top of the league table, and won 11 matches out of 14 with 22 points. The Super Kings stood third, behind Kings XI, getting 16 points from eight wins. There were two changes in the Royals' playing eleven for the final; Graeme Smith and Mahesh Rawat were replaced by Kamran Akmal and Niraj Patel. Smith was ruled out of the match as he was suffering from a hamstring injury. The Super Kings fielded the same side as in its semi-final win over the Kings XI.

== Match ==
=== Summary ===
Overview of the runs scored in the 20 overs of both the innings of the match. The yellow lines refer to the Super Kings, whereas the blue lines refer to the Royals. A red dot represents that a wicket felt in the given over.

Despite the fact that the home team Mumbai Indians was not playing, the match attracted a huge number of spectators. They were exposed to performances by Amrita Arora, Shamita Shetty, Dia Mirza, Salman Khan and Cirque du Soleil. Then a laser show was organised. The match was a day/night match, and started at 20:18 Indian Standard Time (IST) (UTC+05:30). The toss took place at 20:00 IST in the presence of Lalit Modi and match referee Javagal Srinath. Modi flipped the coin, and Royals' captain Warne called heads; the coin turned out to be heads, and Warne won the toss.

Sunil Gavaskar had said in his match report that the batsmen will be required to play more on the front foot because of the inconstant bounce. The pitch was patchy, and Warne chose to field first. The Super Kings lost its first batsman as Sivaramakrishnan went out for 16 runs. He was caught by Ravindra Jadeja when Pathan was up. Sivaramakrishnan pulled a fast ball to deep mid-wicket, and Jadeja took a "well-judged catch". Sivaramakrishnan made 16 runs in 14 balls at a strike rate of 114.28, and played an opening partnership of 39 runs with P. Patel. After that, Raina joined P. Patel, and both of them made 25 runs for the second wicket partnership with a run rate of 6.81. P. Patel was caught in the last ball of the ninth over. Similar to the previous wicket, Pathan bowled a flat and fast ball, P. Patel tried to play it towards the third man. However, the ball edged towards the wicket-keeper Akmal, who initially dropped the ball, but caught it afterwards. P. Patel made 38 runs in 33 balls and hit five boundaries. The next wicket was of Albie Morkel, who made 16 runs out of 13 balls. Pathan again bowled a flat fast ball, which was top edged by Morkel. The ball went into the air, and was eventually caught by Akmal. However this resulted in the collision of Akmal and Mohammad Kaif as both were trying to take the catch, and both of them got injured. Four overs later, Jadeja caught Raina on Watson, breaking a 33 runs fourth wicket partnership between him and captain Mahendra Singh Dhoni. Watson bowled a full-length ball outside off stump. Raina played it towards long off, but failed to get enough distance and Jadeja caught the ball at the boundary. Chamara Kapugedera joined Dhoni after the dismissal of Raina, a decision which "punctured" the momentum in the slog overs. Kapugedera made eight runs by acing 12 balls, before being caught by Swapnil Asnodkar on Sohail Tanvir. Tanvir bowled an angling slower ball, which was lofted on the front foot by Kapugedera. The ball was caught by long-on fielder Asnodkar. With the last five balls remaining in the innings, Dhoni and Subramaniam Badrinath together made 15 runs, and Badrinath made six runs off two balls. Dhoni made 29 runs not out, facing 17 balls, in which he hit two fours and one six. Pathan had the best figures with the ball for the Royals, as he took three wickets for 22 runs in four overs. Tanvir and Watson got one wicket each and gave 40 and 29 runs respectively. Warne gave 34 runs in his four overs, but failed to get any wicket. Munaf Patel and Siddharth Trivedi gave 14 and 21 runs respectively in their two overs each.

In reply, the Royals lost its first batsman as N. Patel went out after scoring two runs in 11 balls. Manpreet Gony bowled a full-length ball outside the off stump, which hit the leg stump after getting an inside edge as N. Patel opted to pull it. He went out in the first ball of the fourth over, leaving his team at 19 runs with loss of one wicket. The Royals lost its second opener when Raina caught Asnodkar as he hit a full and wide ball by Morkel to point. He made 28 runs facing 20 balls. In the same over, Makhaya Ntini ran out Akmal with a direct hit. Akmal played the ball to mid-on, but Ntini glided downwards and threw the ball at the stumps. After the fall of Akmal's wicket, Watson and Pathan started playing more aggressively, and scored 65 runs for a fourth wicket partnership at a run rate of 8.66; this was also the highest partnership of the match. In the eleventh over, Raina dropped Pathan on Murlitharan at deep midwicket. At the end of the thirteenth over, the Royals reached a score of 100 runs. In the fifteenth over, Muralitharan broke the partnership as he bowled Watson; the ball hit the leg stump. The next wicket was of Kaif, who was caught by Dhoni on Muralitharan. Kaif pushed a flat doosra, and Dhoni took a simple catch at cover. In the next ball, Jadeja went out for a golden duck. Morkel bowled a short ball, and Jadeja tried to pull it. However the ball went to mid-on, and Kapugedera caught the ball after running towards his left. In the same over, Raina ran out Pathan with a direct hit at the stumps. Morkel bowled a full ball which was pushed by Warne to point. He ran for a single, but Raina hit the stumps, running out off-striker Pathan. Pathan went out scoring a half-century; he made 56 runs out off 39 balls with a strike rate of 143.58 and hit three fours and four sixes. The Royals needed 18 runs at the end of the eighteenth over. The second last over was bowled by Ntini, in which he gave up ten runs. In the last ball of the over, Ntini bowled a good length ball, and Warne hit a four by Warne at cover. In the last over, the Royals required eight runs, and Dhoni gave the ball to Lakshmipathy Balaji. Six runs were required from the last three balls, but Balaji bowled a wide outside off stump, which was missed by the wicket-keeper P. Patel. This resulted in two extra runs. In the next ball, Warne hit a full ball for a run. The Royals needed three runs from the last two balls. Tanvir played the fifth legal delivery of the over, which was an angling full toss. Tanvir hit the ball at the long leg, and ran two runs. The Royals needed one more run off the last ball, with Tanvir on strike; Balaji bowled him a short ball. Warne had already covered the half distance of the pitch when Tanvir hit the ball. The two batsmen ran for a single and the Royals won the match. Both of them remained not out with nine runs each. Morkel and Muralitharan got two wickets each, giving 25 and 39 runs respectively. Gony got one wicket, whereas Ntini and Balaji had none.

Pathan received the award for maximum sixes in a match; he hit four sixes in the match. He was also named the man of the Match.

=== Scorecard ===
- On-field umpires: Billy Bowden (NZ) and Rudi Koertzen (SA)
- Third umpire: Daryl Harper (Aus)
- Reserve umpire: M. R. Singh (Ind)
- Match referee: Javagal Srinath (Ind)
- Toss: Rajasthan Royals elected to field
- Result: Rajasthan Royals won by 3 wickets
- League impact: Rajasthan Royals won the 2008 Indian Premier League

Chennai Super Kings batting innings
Batsman	Method of dismissal	Runs	Balls	Strike rate
Parthiv Patel †	c † Akmal b Pathan	38	33	115.15
Vidyut Sivaramakrishnan	c Jadeja b Pathan	16	14	114.28
Suresh Raina	c Jadeja b Watson	43	30	143.33
Albie Morkel	c † Akmal b Pathan	16	13	123.07
MS Dhoni *	not out	29	17	170.58
Chamara Kapugedera	c Asnodkar b Tanvir	8	12	66.66
Subramaniam Badrinath	not out	6	2	300.00
Manpreet Gony	did not bat	–	–	–
Lakshmipathy Balaji	did not bat	–	–	–
Muttiah Muralitharan	did not bat	–	–	–
Makhaya Ntini	did not bat	–	–	–
Extras	(1 byes, 2 leg byes, 3 wides, 1 no-balls)	7		
Totals	(20 overs)	163/5		

Rajasthan Royals bowling
Bowler	Overs	Maidens	Runs	Wickets	Economy
Sohail Tanvir	4	0	40	1	10.00
Shane Watson	4	0	29	1	7.25
Munaf Patel	2	0	14	0	7.00
Yusuf Pathan	4	0	22	3	5.50
Siddharth Trivedi	2	0	21	0	10.50
Shane Warne	4	0	34	0	8.50

Rajasthan Royals batting innings
Batsman	Method of dismissal	Runs	Balls	Strike rate
Niraj Patel	b Gony	2	11	18.18
Swapnil Asnodkar	c Raina b Morkel	28	20	140.00
Kamran Akmal †	run out (Ntini)	6	7	85.71
Shane Watson	b Muralitharan	28	19	147.36
Yusuf Pathan	run out (Raina)	56	39	143.58
Mohammad Kaif	c Dhoni b Muralitharan	12	9	133.33
Ravindra Jadeja	c Kapugedera b Morkel	0	1	0.00
Shane Warne *	not out	9	9	100.00
Sohail Tanvir	not out	9	7	128.57
Siddharth Trivedi	did not bat	–	–	–
Munaf Patel	did not bat	–	–	–
Extras	(1 byes, 6 leg byes, 5 wides, 2 no-balls)	14		
Totals	(20 overs)	164/7		

Chennai Super Kings bowling
Bowler	Overs	Maidens	Runs	Wickets	Economy
Makhaya Ntini	4	1	21	0	5.25
Manpreet Gony	4	0	30	1	7.50
Albie Morkel	4	0	25	2	6.25
Lakshmipathy Balaji	4	0	42	0	10.50
Muttiah Muralitharan	4	0	39	2	9.75

Key

- * – Captain
- † – Wicket-keeper
- c Fielder – the batsman was dismissed by a catch by the named fielder
- b Bowler – the bowler who gains credit for the dismissal
- lbw – the batsman was dismissed leg before wicket
- Total runs are in the format: score/wickets

== Aftermath ==
The Royals received ₹48 million (US$500,000) and a trophy for being the champions. Royals' players received their medals from Sharad Pawar in the post-match ceremony. Warne said:

It's been a fantastic journey. We're gelled together really quickly. It makes me proud to see so many young guys learning and executing their skills in the middle. I think the crowds all over India have made the atmosphere amazing. Congratulations to Chennai. It's been a wonderful ride for us.

Royals' Tanvir was given the purple cap for getting the highest number of wickets in the league. Watson was declared as the man of the series; he scored 474 runs and took 17 wickets in the season. The Super Kings received ₹24 million (US$250,000) for being the runners-up. Dhoni said:

I think the standard of our cricket was really good. We were up to the mark in the finals. We lost as a team. There were a few errors in batting and bowling. We're not really unhappy or bogged down by it. We'll go back to our hotel and enjoy it. That's what sport is all about. The response from our team was great. Even the guys who didn't get a chance were completely behind the team. So the spirit was great."

Both teams qualified for the 2008 Champions League Twenty20. However, the tournament was cancelled due to the 2008 Mumbai attacks and both teams were given ₹220 million (US$2.3 million) each as compensation.

Yusuf Pathan's all-round performance, three wickets for 22 runs off 4 overs and his 56 runs from 39 balls, was later declared by ESPNcricinfo as the "greatest IPL performance of all time".
