= Raihanuddin Chowdhury =

Bangladeshi cricketer (born 1985)

Personal information
- Full name: Raihanuddin Chowdhury
- Born: 25 March 1985 (age 41); Chittagong, Bangladesh
- Nickname: Arafat
- Batting: Right handed
- Bowling: Leg break
- Source: Cricinfo, 24 February 2020

Raihanuddin Chowdhury (born 25 March 1985) is a Bangladeshi cricketer. He made his first-class debut for Chittagong Division in the 2003–04 National Cricket League on 3 January 2004.
