= Iain Robertson (cricketer) =

New Zealand cricketer

Iain Anthony Robertson (born 9 November 1982) is a New Zealand former first-class cricketer who played for Canterbury and Otago between the 2005–06 season and 2014–15.

Robertson was born at Christchurch in the Canterbury Region of New Zealand and was educated at St Bede's College in the city. He played age-group cricket for Canterbury from the 1998–99 season and for the New Zealand under-19 side, including at the 2002 Under-19 Cricket World Cup, before making his senior representative debut for Canterbury during the 2005–06 season.

An all-rounder, Robertson played 66 times for the Canterbury senior team, scoring 721 runs and taking 17 wickets for the side in the 20 first-class matches he played. During his final season with the side in 2008–09 he was selected as twelfth man for the New Zealand A side against the touring England Lions. He replaced Ewen Thompson, who had been called into the national side, on the third day of the match and scored an unbeaten century to save the game in his only appearance for the side. The score, 107 not out, was Robertson's second and final first-class century and his highest score in senior cricket.

Known as a "strong striker" of the ball and "a handy offspin bowler", Robertson relocated to Dunedin in 2010 after his wife secured a job in the city. He played some cricket for Southland early in the season and appeared in a single Twenty20 match for Otago during 2010–11. During the 2012–13 season he played in 11 matches for Otago in all three domestic formats and won a contract for the provincial side for the following season, although his role was described as "batting cover in the middle" order as well as playing in one-day matches. Robertson played a further 19 matches for the provincial side, dropping out of the team at the end of the 2014–15 season. He played club cricket in Dunedin for Kaikorai.
