= Riel de Kock =

South African cricketer (born 1983)

Personal information
- Full name: Hendrik Gabriel de Kock
- Born: 12 December 1983 (age 42); Pretoria, South Africa
- Source: ESPNcricinfo, 13 December 2016

Riel de Kock (born 12 December 1983) is a South African cricketer. He played 27 first-class and 24 List A matches between 2004 and 2010. He was also part of South Africa's squad for the 2002 Under-19 Cricket World Cup.
