= Manish Sharma (cricketer, born 1981) =

Indian cricketer (born 1981)

Manish Sharma (born 30 June 1981 in Amritsar, Punjab) is an Indian cricketer who plays for the Chandigarh Lions in the Indian Cricket League. He is a right-hand middle order batsman.

Sharma began playing first-class cricket for Punjab at the age of 19. He played 32 first class matches for Punjab and made his last appearance in 2006. He played 17 matches in list A for Punjab also playing his last match in 2006. He has played 6 matches for Chandigarh Lions in ICL 2007.
