= Rakesh Mohanty =

Indian cricketer (born 1985)

Personal information
- Born: 19 September 1985 (age 41); Cuttack, India
- Source: ESPNcricinfo, 13 December 2016

Rakesh Mohanty (born 19 September 1985) is an Indian cricketer. He played 19 first-class and 19 List A matches between 2004 and 2014. He played for the Odisha under-16 team. Mohanty was also part of India's squad for the 2002 Under-19 Cricket World Cup.
