= Yasin Arafat =

Bangladeshi cricketer (born 1987)

Personal information
- Born: July 7, 1987 (age 39); Chittagong, Bangladesh
- Batting: Right-handed
- Bowling: Right-arm off break

Career statistics
Competition	First-class	List A
Matches	65	28
Runs scored	1,071	63
Batting average	15.30	5.72
100s/50s	0/3	0/0
Top score	55	14
Balls bowled	13,161	1385
Wickets	211	35
Bowling average	28.38	26.74
5 wickets in innings	5	0
10 wickets in match	0	0
Best bowling	7/62	3/27
Catches/stumpings	28/–	11/–
- Source: ESPNcricinfo, 2 September 2017

Yasin Arafat (born 7 July 1987) is a Bangladeshi cricketer who has played first-class and List A cricket. He is a right-handed batsman and off break bowler. He made his debut for Chittagong Division against Rajshahi Division at Comilla in 2003/04.
