= Deepak Chougule =

Indian cricketer

Deepak Chougule is a cricketer who plays for the state of Karnataka in the Ranji Trophy cricket tournament of India. He has also represented India in the Under-19 international tournaments. He made his debut for his state at a junior level in the Under-13 tournament held at Chennai in 1997. On his debut against Goa, he ended up scoring 400 runs in a single day which is a junior world record for the maximum runs scored in a single day of a cricket match.

== Early years ==
Deepak was born on 1 April 1984, in the city of Belgaum, Karnataka. During his early years, he was interested in playing table tennis, football and cricket. He even won several table tennis tournaments and played at the Karnataka State Level TT Championship. He initially started playing cricket as a bowler. He decided to shift to batting because of a chance knock that he played for his team at Belgaum. He was in a hurry to catch a bus to participate in a table tennis tournament in Bangalore but his side was about to start batting. Seeing his urgency, the coach Mr. Feroz Shaikh asked him to open the innings. Deepak went on to score a big knock and helped his side to win the game. This convinced Deepak that he had more potential to play as a batsman than as a bowler and he also decided to shun table tennis in favour of cricket. He will play for Kochi in the 2011 season of the IPL.

== Career ==
Deepak initially started playing for Dharwad zone in inter-zonal tournaments. In 1997, he bagged his junior cap for Karnataka when he was selected to play for the state in "The Sportstar" Under-13 tournament in Chennai. In his first match against Goa, he scored an unbeaten 400 runs in a day. This was a junior world record. He represented Karnataka in the Under-16 V. Pattabhiraman Trophy and Under-19 Ghulam Ahmed Trophy tournaments. He won his junior cap for India and played a crucial role to enable India to win the Asia cup Under-17 tournament in Dhaka in 2000. He bagged the Border-Gavaskar scholarship from the National Cricket Academy and was sent to Australia for training. He was selected to play for India in the Under-19 cricket world cup held in New Zealand in the year 2002. He batted in the crucial one-down position in the World cup but India failed to progress to the finals having lost to South Africa in the semis.
