= Stephen Pope (cricketer) =

English cricketer

Stephen Pope (born 25 January 1983 in Cheltenham, Gloucestershire) is an English cricketer.

He attended Cheltenham Bournside School and Sixth Form Centre, a comprehensive school. He represented England Schoolboys at both cricket and rugby as wicket keeper and scrum half. He was in the same rugby age group as Clive Stuart-Smith and they regularly battled for the number 9 shirt at English schoolboy level. Pope was known for his acceleration, box kicking and aggressive style of play on the rugby pitch.

He signed for Gloucestershire County Cricket Club aged 16 and was identified as a potential successor for Jack Russell with whom he eventually trained and played in the same team. He is a right-handed batsman and a wicket-keeper who has played List A cricket since 1999 and played Twenty20 cricket during the 2003 season, helping Gloucestershire to the semi-finals. He was the Denis Compton Award winner in 2002. Pope played for England at the 2002 ICC Under-19 World Cup in New Zealand and youth Test Match series against West Indies and India.

In 2003, he played in five first-class matches for the county, which gained promotion that year to Division 1. Pope was released by Gloucestershire in 2003 after the club decided it wanted a wicketkeeper who could bat in the top eight. After his release, he trained with Old Patesians RFC as he considered a return to rugby. He signed a one-year contract for Surrey County Cricket Club in 2006, playing in one List A match. Since retiring from cricket, Pope has qualified as a PE teacher and taught in Kenya for seven years before returning to the UK. He regularly coaches cricket and also publishes guidance on cricket through the company CrickiTeacher.

In 2020 he was recruited to participate in the English deaf cricket team and trained with the squad following the approach to him as he requires a hearing aid. Pope gave a YouTube interview explaining his recent return to cricket after taking on a role in Farnham relating to his teaching career and coaching position at Farnham Cricket Club.In 2023 he was awarded a full England cap after helping the England Deaf cricket team achieve a memorable 2022 Ashes and one day series victory against Australia in Brisbane.
