= Umal Irandika =

Sri Lankan cricketer (born 1980)

Personal information
- Born: 11 November 1980 (age 46); Galle, Sri Lanka
- Source: ESPNcricinfo, 13 December 2016

Umal Irandika (born 11 November 1980) is a Sri Lankan cricketer. He played 29 first-class and 20 List A matches between 1999 and 2009. He was also part of Sri Lanka's squad for the 2000 Under-19 Cricket World Cup.
