= Brendan McKerchar =

Scottish cricketer, rugby union player, educator

Personal information
- Full name: Brendan Thomas McKerchar
- Born: 23 January 1983 (age 43); Leith, Midlothian, Scotland
- Height: 5 ft 9 in (1.75 m)
- Batting: Right-handed
- Bowling: Right-arm medium

Domestic team information
- Years: Team
- 2008–2009: Oxford University

Career statistics
Competition	First-class
Matches	2
Runs scored	23
Batting average	5.75
100s/50s	–/–
Top score	16
Catches/stumpings	–/–
- Source: Cricinfo, 11 June 2020

Brendan Thomas McKerchar (born 23 January 1983) is a Scottish educator and a former first-class cricketer and rugby union player.

McKerchar was born at Leith in January 1983. He was educated at Merchiston Castle School, before going up to the University of Durham. McKerchar played for the Scotland under-19 cricket team in the 2002 Under-19 Cricket World Cup, making six appearances during the tournament. He played domestic rugby union in Scotland as a scrum half for Border Reivers in the 2005/06 and 2006/07 seasons, making eleven appearances in the Celtic Cup and three in the 2006–07 Heineken Cup.

With the disbanding of Border Reivers in 2007, McKerchar studied for his masters degree at Keble College, Oxford. While studying at Oxford, he made two appearances in first-class cricket for Oxford University in The University Matches of 2008 and 2009 against Cambridge University. He gained a blue in both cricket and rugby union, with McKerchar also playing for Oxford University RFC in the rugby Varsity Match.

After graduating from Oxford, McKerchar taught at Merchiston Castle School, where he was director of rugby. In 2010, he became director of sport at Emanuel School in London. He began teaching biology at Harrow School in 2014, where he was also director of sport. He was appointed house master of Druries in 2019.
