= Dumisa Makalima =

South African cricketer (born 1980)

Personal information
- Born: 29 December 1980 (age 45); East London, South Africa
- Source: ESPNcricinfo, 12 December 2016

Dumisa Makalima (born 29 December 1980) is a South African cricketer. He played 55 first-class and 74 List A matches between 1997 and 2009. He was also part of South Africa's squad for the 2000 Under-19 Cricket World Cup.
