= Gazi Salahuddin =

Bangladeshi cricketer (born 1984)

Personal information
- Full name: Gazi Salahuddin
- Born: November 8, 1984 (age 42); Brahmanbaria, Bangladesh
- Batting: Right-handed
- Bowling: Right-arm off-break

Domestic team information
- Years: Team
- 2004–present: Chittagong Division
- First-class debut: 17 January 2004 2004 Chittagong Division v Khulna Division
- Last First-class: 9 January 2004 Chittagong Division v Barisal Division
- Source: ESPNcricinfo, 16 June 2019

Gazi Salahuddin (born 8 November 1984) is a first class and list a cricketer from Bangladesh. He made his first class debut for Chittagong Division in the 2003/04 season. He also represented Bangladesh A in 2006/07. He has recorded 4 first class centuries and 13 fifties, with a fine knock of 165 against Barisal Division

== See also ==
- List of Chittagong Division cricketers
