= Mritunjay Tripathi =

Indian cricketer (born 1981)

Personal information
- Full name: Mrityunjay Banshidhar Tripathi
- Born: 13 December 1981 (age 44); Varanasi, India
- Source: ESPNcricinfo, 12 December 2016

Mritunjay Tripathi (born 13 December 1981) is an Indian cricketer. He played thirteen first-class and eleven List A matches between 1999 and 2004. He was also part of India's squad for the 2000 Under-19 Cricket World Cup.
