= Lorenzo Ingram =

Jamaican cricketer (born 1983)

Personal information
- Full name: Lorenzo Trence Ingram
- Born: 14 April 1983 (age 43); Trelawny Parish, Jamaica
- Batting: Left-handed
- Bowling: Left-arm off-break
- Role: Batsman

Domestic team information
- Years: Team
- 2003–2008: Jamaica
- Source: ESPNcricinfo, 4 May 2016

Lorenzo Terence Ingram (born 14 April 1983) is a Jamaican first-class cricketer who played for Jamaica national cricket team in West Indian domestic cricket. He is a left-handed batsman as slow left-arm orthodox bowler.
