= Waseluddin Ahmed =

Bangladeshi cricketer (born 1986)

Personal information
- Born: 1 January 1986 (age 40); Chittagong, Bangladesh
- Batting: Right-handed
- Bowling: Right-arm medium

Career statistics
| Competition | First-class | List A |
|---|---|---|
| Matches | 12 | 14 |
| Runs scored | 472 | 181 |
| Batting average | 24.84 | 18.10 |
| 100s/50s | 0/2 | 0/0 |
| Top score | 74 | 49* |
| Balls bowled | 810 | 474 |
| Wickets | 10 | 9 |
| Bowling average | 37.20 | 34.55 |
| 5 wickets in innings | 0 | 0 |
| 10 wickets in match | 0 | 0 |
| Best bowling | 3/36 | 2/21 |
| Catches/stumpings | 4/– | 0/– |
- Source: CricketArchive, 30 December 2021

Waseluddin Ahmed (born 1 January 1986) is a Bangladeshi first-class and List A cricketer. He is a right-handed batsman and right arm medium pace bowler.

== Career ==
Ahmed made his debut for Chittagong Division in 2002/03 and played through the 2006/07 season. He played for Bangladesh A in 2004/05 and in Under-19 ODIs for Bangladesh Under-19s in 2001/02.

He has made 2 first-class fifties, with a best of 74 against Khulna Division and took 3 for 36 against Barisal Division. His best limited overs score is a knock of 49* against Zimbabwe A.
