= Alfred Mbwembwe =

Zimbabwean cricketer

Personal information
- Born: 16 April 1984 (age 42); Harare, Zimbabwe
- Batting: Right-handed
- Bowling: Right-arm medium-fast

Domestic team information
- Years: Team
- 2002: Mashonaland A
- 2002: Mashonaland
- Source: CricketArchive, 5 August 2016

Alfred Mbwembwe (born 16 April 1984) is a former Zimbabwean cricketer who represented Mashonaland and Mashonaland A in Zimbabwean domestic cricket. He played as a right-arm pace bowler.

Mbwembwe was born in Harare. He was selected in the Zimbabwe under-19s squad for the 2002 Under-19 World Cup in New Zealand, and appeared in seven of his team's eight matches. He finished with seven wickets at the tournament, including 2/18 against Bangladesh and 2/29 against Namibia. Mbwembwe made his first-class debut a few months after the World Cup, playing a single Logan Cup match for Mashonaland A against Midlands. He took 1/25 and 1/19 on debut. During the 2002–03 season, Mbwembwe played another three Logan Cup matches, appearing for Mashonaland against Manicaland, Matabeleland, and Midlands. He took only three wickets in those games, and made no further top-level appearances.
