= Chandan Madan =

Indian cricketer (born 1982)

Personal information
- Full name: Chandan Madan
- Born: 15 October 1982 (age 43); Amritsar, Punjab, India
- Batting: Right-handed
- Role: Wicket-keeper

Domestic team information
- Years: Team
- 2010: Mumbai Indians
- Source: ESPNcricinfo

Chandan Madan (born 15 October 1982) is an Indian cricketer. He played as a wicket-keeper for Punjab cricket team, India U-19 cricket team, North Zone cricket team and Mumbai Indians. He was born in Amritsar.
