= Omesh Wijesiriwardene =

Sri Lankan cricketer (born 1983)

Personal information
- Full name: Omesh Lakpriya Agampodi Wijesiriwardene
- Born: 10 March 1983 (age 43); Galle, Sri Lanka
- Batting: Right-handed
- Bowling: Right-arm fast medium
- Source: ESPNcricinfo, 15 December 2016

Omesh Wijesiriwardene (born 10 March 1983) is a Sri Lankan cricketer. He played 81 first-class and 33 List A matches between 2000 and 2016. He was also part of Sri Lanka's squad for the 2002 Under-19 Cricket World Cup.
