= Jordan Sheed =

New Zealand cricketer (born 1982)

Jordan William Sheed (born 24 September 1982) is a New Zealand former cricketer. He played in the 2002 Under-19 Cricket World Cup and for eight seasons for Otago.

Sheed was born at Timaru in South Canterbury in 1982 and educated at Otago Boys' High School at Dunedin. He played for Otago age-group teams from the 1998–99 season before making his senior debut for the team in January 2002 whilst a Physical Education and Marketing student at Otago University. He played six matches for the national under-19 team during the 2002 under-19 World Cup later in the month before making his first-class debut for Otago later in the season. In eight seasons he made 67 appearances for Otago, scoring over 1,500 first-class runs.
