= Irfan Fazil =

Pakistani cricketer (born 1981)

Personal information
- Full name: Mohammad Irfan Fazil
- Born: 2 November 1981 (age 45); Lahore, Punjab, Pakistan
- Batting: Right-handed
- Bowling: Right-arm fast-medium

International information
- National side: Pakistan
- Only Test (cap 161): 12 March 2000 v Sri Lanka
- Only ODI (cap 133): 16 April 2000 v West Indies

Career statistics
Competition	Test	ODI
Matches	1	1
Runs scored	4	15
Batting average	4.00	15.00
100s/50s	0/0	0/0
Top score	3	15
Balls bowled	48	36
Wickets	2	0
Bowling average	32.50	–
5 wickets in innings	0	–
10 wickets in match	0	–
Best bowling	1/30	–
Catches/stumpings	2/–	0/–
- Source: ESPNcricinfo, 4 February 2006

Mohammad Irfan Fazil (born 2 November 1981) is a Pakistani former cricketer. He is a right-handed batsman and a right-arm medium-fast bowler. He has played in one Test match, and in the 2004/05 season he switched to Twenty20 cricket.
