= Gareth Irwin =

New Zealand cricketer (born 1981)

Personal information
- Born: 6 March 1981 (age 45); Hamilton, New Zealand
- Source: ESPNcricinfo, 12 December 2016

Gareth Irwin (born 6 March 1981) is a New Zealand cricketer. He played one first-class match in 2002/03 for Northern Districts. He was also part of New Zealand's squad for the 2000 Under-19 Cricket World Cup.
