= Anisul Hakim =

Bangladeshi cricketer (born 1975)

Personal information
- Full name: Mohammad Anisul Hakim Khan Rabbani
- Born: September 24, 1975 (age 51); Comilla, Bangladesh
- Batting: Right-handed
- Bowling: Right-arm off-break
- Source: ESPNcricinfo, 30 June 2019

Anisul Hakim (born 24 September 1975) better known as Anis is a first class cricketer who played for Chittagong Division from 2001/02 to 2003/04. A steady right-handed batsman, he scored 3 centuries in his 22 first class matches, with a best of 118 against Khulna Division. His occasional off breaks were rarely called upon. He was less successful in his 13 list A one-day matches, with his top score of 45 coming against Sylhet Division.

== See also ==
- List of Chittagong Division cricketers
