= Taraia Robin =

New Zealand cricketer (born 1982)

Personal information
- Born: 30 August 1982 (age 44); Hastings, New Zealand
- Source: ESPNcricinfo, 12 December 2016

Taraia Robin (born 30 August 1982) is a New Zealand cricketer. He played three first-class and one List A matches between 1999 and 2001. He was also part of New Zealand's squad for the 2000 Under-19 Cricket World Cup.
