= Leighton Morgan =

New Zealand cricketer (born 1981)

Personal information
- Full name: Leighton James Morgan
- Born: 16 February 1981 (age 45); Wellington, New Zealand
- Batting: Right-handed
- Bowling: Slow left-arm orthodox

Domestic team information
- Years: Team
- 2001/02–2002/03: Wellington
- 2007/08–2009/10: Otago
- Source: ESPNcricinfo, 18 May 2016

Leighton James Morgan (born 16 February 1981) is a New Zealand former cricketer. He played first-class cricket for Wellington in the 2001–02 and 2002–03 seasons and for Otago between 2007–08 and 2009–10.

Morgan was born at Wellington in 1981 and educated at St Patrick's College in the city. He played cricket for his school and went on to play in age-group sides for Wellington. In early 2000 he was part of the New Zealand under-19 side which played at the Under-19 Cricket World Cup in Sri Lanka, making two appearances in the competition.

Morgan made his senior debut for Wellington towards the end of the 2001–02 season, playing in the team's final two Plunket Shield matches of the season. He made two further first-class appearances the following season before falling out of the Wellington team. After moving to Dunedin where he played club cricket for Upper Valley, he re-emerged to play for Otago as a contracted player ahead of the 2007–08 season, playing 14 first-class and five List A matches over the following three seasons. In his 18 first-class matches, Morgan scored a total of 844 runs, including seven half-centuries, all made playing for Otago. He played club cricket in the Kent Cricket League in England for Folkestone and Tunbridge Wells Cricket Clubs and for London New Zealand whilst living in the country. He played Hawke Cup cricket for the Otago Country cricket team, and, after his contract with Otago was not renewed at the end of the 2009–10 season, moved back to Wellington where he captained Upper Hutt whilst working as a sales manager for Wellington Rugby Union in the capital.
