= Shafiul Alam =

Bangladeshi cricketer (born 1985)

Personal information
- Born: January 1, 1985 (age 41); Khulna, Bangladesh
- Batting: Right-handed
- Bowling: Right-arm off break

Career statistics
Competition	First-class	List A
Matches	19	22
Runs scored	768	326
Batting average	22.58	15.52
100s/50s	0/5	0/2
Top score	77	58
Balls bowled	651	427
Wickets	13	9
Bowling average	24.53	31.22
5 wickets in innings	0	0
10 wickets in match	0	–
Best bowling	4/34	3/36
Catches/stumpings	10/–	5/–
- Source: CricketArchive, 30 December 2021

Mohammad Shafiul Alam is a first-class and List A cricketer from Bangladesh. He was born on 1 January 1985 in Khulna and is a right-handed batsman and off break bowler. Sometimes referred to on scoresheets by his nickname Sabuj, he made his debut for Khulna Division in 2002/03 and played through the 2006/07 season. He appeared for Bangladesh Under-19s in Youth One Day Internationals in 2001/02.

He scored 5 first-class fifties, with a best of 77 against Rajshahi Division. His best first-class bowling, 4 for 34, came against Chittagong Division, the only time he has taken more than 1 first-class wicket in an innings. He has scored 2 limited overs fifties, both against Barisal Division, with a top score of 58.
