= Kuntal Chandra =

Bangladeshi cricketer (1984–2012)

Personal information
- Full name: Kuntal Chandra
- Born: 8 November 1984; Tangail, Dhaka, Bangladesh
- Died: 3 December 2012 (aged 28); Dhaka-Gazipur, Bangladesh
- Nickname: Papon
- Batting: Right-handed
- Role: Wicketkeeper

Domestic team information
- Years: Team
- 2004/05: Chittagong Division
- 2007: Sylhet Division

Career statistics
Competition	First-class	List A
Matches	3	2
Runs scored	132	0
Batting average	26.40	0.00
100s/50s	0/1	0/0
Top score	71	0
Catches/stumpings	8/0	5/0
- Source: Cricinfo, 26 August 2016

Kuntal Chandra (8 November 1984 – 3 December 2012) was a cricketer from Bangladesh.

Chandra was a right-handed batsman and wicket keeper sometimes known by his nickname Papon. He studied at Bangladesh Krira Shikkha Protishtan. After playing for Bangladesh Under-19s in 2000, he made his debut for Chittagong Division in 2004–2005 against Rajshahi Division, taking five catches and scoring 71 and 33. Despite this promising beginning he played only two more first-class matches, and those not until the 2007–2008 season. He also played in two List A one-day matches in 2005.

== Death ==
Chandra was found dead at the outskirts of Dhaka, on a stopbank along the Uttara-Ashulia road near Dhour on 3 December 2012. He was discovered by the locals who then called the police. His body was found blindfolded and with pieces of cloth stuffed into his mouth. The body also bore signs of being beaten. Initial assessment by the local police indicated that Chandra likely died by strangulation.
