= Tobias Verwey =

Namibian cricketer (born 1981)

Personal information
- Born: 2 November 1981 (age 45); Ermelo, Transvaal Province, South Africa
- Batting: Right-handed
- Bowling: Leg break
- Role: Occasional wicket-keeper

International information
- National side: Namibia

Domestic team information
- Years: Team
- 2006/07–2013/14: Namibia

Career statistics
| Competition | FC | LA | T20 |
|---|---|---|---|
| Matches | 31 | 26 | 17 |
| Runs scored | 900 | 251 | 173 |
| Batting average | 21.42 | 16.73 | 21.62 |
| 100s/50s | 1/3 | 0/0 | 0/0 |
| Top score | 114 | 42 | 33* |
| Balls bowled | 1,095 | 228 | 156 |
| Wickets | 15 | 8 | 9 |
| Bowling average | 49.46 | 27.50 | 21.55 |
| 5 wickets in innings | 1 | 0 | 0 |
| 10 wickets in match | 0 | 0 | 0 |
| Best bowling | 5/46 | 3/49 | 3/31 |
| Catches/stumpings | 47/3 | 14/– | 5/– |
- Source: CricketArchive, 27 January 2025

Tobias Verwey (born 2 November 1981) is a Namibian former cricketer. He is a right-handed batsman and a wicket-keeper. He played first-class cricket with the Namibian cricket team between 2005 and the 2010–11 South African season, having represented the team in 12 Youth One Day Internationals between 2000 and 2002.

He played for Namibia's Under-19 World Cup squads of 2000 and 2002 before stepping up to the first-team squad. He has since played in the respective tours to Namibia of the Pakistani and Bermudan teams.

In December 2006, Verwey scored his first century for the Namibian team, against the United Arab Emirates.
