= Hendrik Geldenhuys =

Namibian cricketer (born 1983)

Personal information
- Full name: Hendrik W Geldenhuys
- Born: Windhoek, Khomas Region, Namibia
- Batting: Left-handed
- Bowling: Left-arm fast-medium

Domestic team information
- Years: Team
- 2007/08–2009/10: Namibia

Career statistics
Competition	First-class
Matches	2
Runs scored	9
Batting average	9.00
100s/50s	–/–
Top score	9
Balls bowled	126
Wickets	1
Bowling average	81.00
5 wickets in innings	–
10 wickets in match	–
Best bowling	1/31
Catches/stumpings	–/–
- Source: CricketArchive (subscription required), 16 October 2011

Hendrik Geldenhuys (born 21 March 1983) is a Namibian cricketer.

Geldenhuys was part of the Namibian Under-19s Cricket World Cup squad of January 2002, captained by veteran Stephan Swanepoel. He made five appearances during the tournament, top scoring in the final match he played for the team, with 17 runs.

Geldenhuys was a tailender batsman who bowled infrequently for the young team. He made his first-class debut for Namibia against Free State in February 2008, taking bowling figures of 1/31.
