= Reetinder Singh Sodhi =

Indian cricketer (born 1980)

Personal information
- Born: 18 October 1980 (age 46); Patiala, Punjab, India
- Batting: Right-handed
- Bowling: Right-arm medium fast
- Role: All-rounder

International information
- National side: India
- ODI debut (cap 82): 2 December 2000 v Zimbabwe
- Last ODI: 21 November 2002 v West Indies

Domestic team information
- Years: Team
- 2010: Kings XI Punjab
- Source: ESPNcricinfo, 6 February 2022

Reetinder Singh Sodhi (born 18 October 1980) is a former Indian cricketer. He was an all-rounder from Punjab and was one of the options that Indian selectors had while looking for an all-rounder. He was the key member of India's first under 19 world cup winning team Sodhi made his One Day International debut against Zimbabwe at Cuttack in December 2000.

== Career ==
He was selected in 2000 for the first intake of the National Cricket Academy in Bangalore. Reetinder Singh Sodhi was the captain in India's U-15 World Cup win in 1996, and later on was vice-captain in India's U-19 World Cup win in 2000. Sodhi was included in the Indian One Day International squad in December 2000, and after his rapid rise into the national team at a young age, he was regarded as a long-term international prospect. He had also played for Ahmedabad Rockets in the Indian Cricket League.

However, he was dropped soon after and has ceased to be among the front-runners for Indian selection. He now works as a match referee in first-class cricket.
