= Rifaiz Bakas =

Dutch cricketer

Personal information
- Full name: M. Rifaiz R. Bakas
- Born: 5 May 1982 (age 44); Surinam, Nickerie
- Batting: Left-handed
- Bowling: Right-arm medium

Domestic team information
- Years: Team
- 1998, 2017: Rood en Wit
- 2007: Excelsior '20
- 2013: United Haarlem
- 2015: Dosti

Career statistics
Competition	First-class
Matches	1
Runs scored	16
Batting average	8.00
100s/50s	–/–
Top score	16
Catches/stumpings	–/–
- Source: Cricinfo, 8 February 2022

M. Rifaiz R. Bakas (born 5 May 1982) is a Dutch former first-class cricketer.

Bakas was born in Surinam in May 1982. He was a member of the Netherlands under-19 team for the 2000 Under-19 Cricket World Cup, making five appearances in the tournament. He later made a single appearance in first-class cricket for the Netherlands senior team against Kenya in August 2008 at Amstelveen in the Intercontinental Cup. Batting twice in the match as an opening batsman, he was dismissed for an 11–ball duck in the Dutch first innings by Thomas Odoyo, while in their second innings he was dismissed for 16 runs by Peter Ongondo. Bakas played his club cricket in the Netherlands for Rood en Wit (1998–2006 & 2017–present), Excelsior '20 (2007–2011), United Haarlem (2013–2014), and Dosti (2015–2016).
