= Hugo Ludik =

Namibian cricketer (born 1983)

Personal information
- Full name: Hugo Ludik
- Born: 25 September 1983 (age 43); Potchefstroom, Transvaal Province, South Africa
- Batting: Right-handed
- Role: Wicket-keeper

International information
- National side: Namibia

Domestic team information
- Years: Team
- 2004/05–2007/08: Namibia

Career statistics
Competition	First-class	List A
Matches	6	10
Runs scored	120	109
Batting average	13.33	27.25
100s/50s	–/–	–/–
Top score	39	43
Balls bowled	–	–
Wickets	–	–
Bowling average	–	–
5 wickets in innings	–	–
10 wickets in match	–	–
Best bowling	–	–
Catches/stumpings	11/–	13/–
- Source: CricketArchive (subscription required), 16 October 2011

Hugo Ludik (born 25 September 1983, South Africa) is a retired Namibian cricketer and also a musician.

Having first participated in the Under-19s World Cup of 2002, Ludik later took part in two tournaments involving the Zimbabwean cricket team, the first of which took place in his adopted homeland in August 2003. Ludik had previously appeared in seven Youth One-day Internationals before joining the senior team. Ludik represented Namibia during the 2005 ICC Trophy. Ludik played for the Namibian National side from 2003 to 2007.

Ludik is also a successful recording artist and songwriter. In 2008, he won the Huisgenoot Tempo songwriting contest for co-writing the Kurt Darren track "Papsopwinterwaternat". In 2010, Ludik also formed the band ADAM, a successful Afrikaans pop-rock trio, who, in 2011, released their debut self-titled album. The group has to date reached the number 1 spot on four different radio stations with their first single, "Liefde Soldaat", and are also in the Top 10 best sellers of 2011 in the Afrikaans market.

Ludik's family consists of: father Paul (forensic scientist), mother Susan (insurance broker) and brother, Stefan – also a musician and actor.
