= Anup Dave =

Indian cricketer (born 1981)

Personal information
- Full name: Anup Madhusudhan Dave
- Born: 2 May 1981 (age 45); Banswara, India
- Batting: Right-handed
- Source: ESPNcricinfo, 30 November 2016

Anup Dave (born 2 May 1981) is an Indian first-class cricketer who represented Rajasthan. He made his first-class debut for Rajasthan in the 1998-99 Ranji Trophy on 23 February 1999.
