= Stefan Ludik =

- Born: April 5, 1981 (age 44); Windhoek, Namibia
- Occupations: Singer, songwriter, actor, cricketer
- Years active: 2003–present
- Spouse: Anelle Bester
- Relatives: Hugo
- Musical career
- Genres: Pop, rock, hip hop, dance
- Instrument: Vocals
- Website: www.stefanludik.co.za

Stefan Ludik (born April 5, 1981) is a Namibian musician, television personality, actor, and former cricketer from Windhoek City. He was the first contestant to represent Namibia in the reality television program Big Brother Africa. He is now a popular Afrikaans singer and actor.

== Cricket career ==
Ludik was a right-handed batsman and a right-arm medium-pace bowler who played for the Namibia Under-19s in 1999-2000.

Ludik combined sturdy lower-order batting with an occasional medium-pace bowling and consistent outfielding. He did not play for Namibia beyond the under-19 level.

== Television career ==
Ludik competed in the first series of Big Brother Africa, where he first became famous. Since appearing on Big Brother, Ludik has appeared in South African Afrikaans-language TV shows, such as Egoli: Place of Gold, Transito, and Binnelanders (also known as Binneland).

== Big Brother controversy ==
Ludik's participation in this pan-African version of Big Brother was controversial as he was the only white member of the household, representing his home country of Namibia, a majority black country. At the time, some letters to the editor of The Namibian newspaper "accused Ludik of only 'knowing white culture' and being 'Euro-Namibian.'" Some critics stated that it was "an 'insult' for him to have carried a Herero doll into the house because he did not understand its symbolic significance."

Other writers to The Namibian noted that Ludik's presence showed that "Africa is multicultural, especially Namibia," and that Ludik did not seem "to notice that he is the only white one".

Ludik's mother, Susan, responded in the press that "Stefan has friends of different races who come and sleep over and call me 'tannie'. We are Namibians. Our friends are from all races." She further explained that Ludik carried the Herero doll with him into the Big Brother house "because he wanted something that would symbolise Namibia".

Ludik was the seventh contestant (out of twelve) to be evicted from the Big Brother house, lasting 98 out of 106 days. Through part of the series, he was considered the most popular housemate.

== Music career ==
Ludik has recorded songs in both Afrikaans and English. He has performed under his original name, as simply Ludik, and as Elvis se Seun.

In 2011, he won the Afroatainment Museke Online Africa Music Award (MOAMA) for best alternative song for the single "Black Girl, White Boy," which he recorded with Namibian female duo, Gal Level.

There was controversy surrounding performances of the song and the making of the promotional video for the song. The magazine Heat published stills from the video shoot showing Ludik in a "steamy clinch" with Namibian model Elizabeth Valombeleni; the magazine published the photos under the headline, "Did Ludik Make a Porno?" Ludik commented at the time, "What hypocrisy. When I acted on Egoli, I appeared much more naked than in this video. And Egoli is a family show, why was the nudity acceptable there but not in my music video?" Ludik noted that ever since the performance of "Black Girl, White Boy" at the Namibia Annual Music Awards (Namas) earlier in 2011, in which he shared a kiss with singer Frieda from Gal Level, he had been at the receiving end of racist comments.

== Other activities ==
In 2004, Ludik participated in a campaign to promote organ donation in Namibia. In 2006, Ludik was invited to be a member of the Team Namibia Goodwill Ambassadors Club.

== Personal life ==
Ludik's family consists of father Paul (forensic scientist), mother Susan (insurance broker) and younger brother Hugo, also a musician and retired cricketer. Prior to appearing in Big Brother Africa, Ludik studied forensic sciences, qualified in psycho-physiological detection of deception, and started his own business, Invictus Intelligence. At the time of his appearance on Big Brother, he listed his occupation as polygraph (lie detector test) examiner.

On 1 January 2018, Ludik became engaged to long-time girlfriend and fellow actor, Anelle Bester. The couple were later married, and their wedding was featured on the South African celebrity TV programme, Top Billing.

== Selected filmography ==
- Big Brother Africa, Season 1, 2003
- Haak en Steek, 2003
- Egoli: Place of Gold, as "Werner Krantz," 2004-2007
- Transito, as "Francois Brink," 2008
- Binnelanders/Binneland, as "Gustav Kemp," 2012-2014
- Isidingo, as Clive Van Staden, 2018-

== Selected discography ==
- Liggroen Doringbome, 2005 (as Stefan Ludik)
- Vuur en Water, 2007
- Burn This Town, 2010 (as Ludik)
- Boererock, 2014 (as Elvis se Seun)
- "Disappear" by Nigel Good featuring Mango, Andre Frauenstein and Stefan Ludik, 2015
- Jy Speel 'n Game Met My, 2016 (as Elvis se Seun)
- Goeie Tye, 2017 (as Elvis se Seun)
