= Peter Shields (cricketer) =

Irish cricketer

Personal information
- Full name: Ian Peter Shields
- Born: 31 October 1979 (age 47); Comber, Northern Ireland
- Batting: Right-handed
- Role: Wicket-keeper

Domestic team information
- Years: Team
- 1999–2000: Ireland

Career statistics
Competition	First-class
Matches	2
Runs scored	54
Batting average	13.50
100s/50s	0/0
Top score	31
Catches/stumpings	2/0
- Source: Cricinfo, 26 October 2018

Ian Peter Shields (born 31 October 1979) is a former Irish first-class cricketer.

Born at Comber in October 1979, Shields was educated at Regent House School in Newtownards, before going up to Ulster University. He made his debut in first-class cricket for Ireland against Scotland at Belfast in 1999. He was captain of the Ireland under-19 squad for the 2000 Under-19 Cricket World Cup in Sri Lanka, playing in seven matches at the tournament. He made a second first-class appearance for Ireland against Scotland at Alloway in 2000, in what was the final annual first-class match played between the teams. In two first-class matches, Shields scored 54 runs, with a high score of 31 as an opening batsman alongside Dominick Joyce in the 2000 fixture. Outside of cricket, he runs a sports goods business.
