= Suja Irfan =

Bangladeshi cricketer (born 1978)

Personal information
- Born: 4 August 1978 (age 48); Chittagong, Bangladesh
- Batting: Left-handed
- Bowling: Slow left-arm orthodox
- Source: ESPNcricinfo, 16 June 2019

Suja Irfan is a cricketer from Bangladesh. He is a left-handed batsman and slow left arm orthodox spin bowler. He played for Chittagong Division from 2000/01 to 2002/03 taking a five wicket haul 5 for 69 against Dhaka Division.

He was born on 4 August 1978 in Chittagong and is a left-handed batsman and slow left arm orthodox spin bowler.

He played for Chittagong Division from 2000/01 to 2002/03, taking a five wicket haul, 5 for 69, against Dhaka Division.
