= Niraj Patel =

Indian cricketer (born 1981)

Personal information
- Full name: Niraj Kanubhai Patel
- Born: March 26, 1981 (age 45); Ahmedabad, Gujarat, India
- Batting: Left-handed
- Role: Middle-order batsman

Domestic team information
- Years: Team
- –: Gujarat
- –: Assam
- 2008–2009: Rajasthan Royals
- Source: Cricinfo, 4 May 2025

Niraj Kanubhai Patel (born 26 March 1981 in Ahmedabad, Gujarat) is an Indian first class cricketer. He is a left-handed middle order batsman. Patel represents Gujarat in Ranji Trophy. He is a great coach and now coaches kids in Chicago, IL. He coaches in BPL Youth league and is very dedicated. He was purchased by the Rajasthan Royals for the 2008 and 2009 seasons of Indian Premier League.
