= List of Sunrisers Hyderabad records =

IPL cricket team based in Hyderabad, India

Sunrisers Hyderabad (SRH) are a franchise cricket team based in Hyderabad, Telangana, India, that plays in the Indian Premier League (IPL). The franchise is owned by Kalanithi Maran of the Sun TV Network and was founded in 2012 after the Hyderabad-based Deccan Chargers were terminated by the IPL. The team is currently captained by Pat Cummins and coached by Daniel Vettori. Their primary home ground is the Rajiv Gandhi International Cricket Stadium, Hyderabad, which has capacity of 55,000.

The team made their first IPL appearance in 2013, where they reached the playoffs, eventually finishing in fourth place. The Sunrisers won their maiden IPL title in the 2016 season, defeating Royal Challengers Bangalore by 8 runs in the final. The team has qualified for the play-off stage of the tournament in every season since 2016 making them rack up more wins than the all celebrated RCB. In 2018, the team reached the finals of the Indian Premier League, but lost to Chennai Super Kings. David Warner is the leading run scorer for the team, having won the Orange Cap 3 times, in 2015, 2017, and 2019. Bhuvneshwar Kumar is the leading wicket-taker. The coronavirus pandemic impacted the brand value of the Sunrisers Hyderabad which was estimated to be US$57.4million in 2020 as the overall brand of IPL was decreased to US$4.4billion, according to Brand Finance.

== Listing criteria ==
In general the top five are listed in each category (except when there is a tie for the last place among the five, when all the tied record holders are noted).

== Listing notation ==
Team notation

- (200–3) indicates that a team scored 200 runs for three wickets and the innings was closed, either due to a successful run chase or if no playing time remained
- (200) indicates that a team scored 200 runs and was all out

Batting notation

- (100) indicates that a batsman scored 100 runs and was out
- (100*) indicates that a batsman scored 100 runs and was not out

Bowling notation

- (5–20) indicates that a bowler has captured 5 wickets while conceding 20 runs

Currently playing

- † indicates a current cricketer

Start Date

- indicates the date the match starts

== Team records ==
=== Team Performance ===
Year	Total	Wins	Losses	No result	Tied and won	Tied and lost	Win %	Position	Summary
2013	17	10	7	0	1	0	58.82	4th	Playoffs
2014	14	6	8	0	0	0	42.86	6th	Group-Stage
2015	14	7	7	0	0	0	50.00	6th	Group-Stage
2016	17	11	6	0	0	0	64.70	3rd	Champions
2017	15	8	6	1	0	0	57.14	4th	Playoffs
2018	17	10	7	0	0	0	58.82	1st	Runners-up
2019	15	6	8	0	0	1	46.70	4th	Playoffs
2020	16	8	7	0	0	1	50.00	3rd	Playoffs
2021	14	3	10	0	0	1	21.43	8th	Group Stage
2022	14	6	8	0	0	0	42.86	8th	Group Stage
2023	14	4	10	0	0	1	28.57	10th	Group Stage
2024	17	9	7	0	0	1	52.94	2nd	Runners-up
2025	14	6	7	1	0	0	52.94	6th	Group Stage
2026	15	9	6	0	0	0	60.00	3rd	Playoffs
Total	211	102	104	2	1	5	47.44	One time Champion	
Last Updated: 7 June 2025

=== Team wins, losses and draws ===
Opponent	Span	Matches	Won	Lost	Tied and won	Tied and lost	No Result	Win %
CSK	2008–2015, 2018–2023	18	5	13	0	0	0	27.77
DD	2013–2021	21	11	9	0	1	0	54.76
GL^{†}	2016–2017	5	5	0	0	0	0	100.00
GT	2022	2	1	1	0	0	0	50.00
KKR	2008–2023	24	9	14	0	1	0	39.6
LSG	2022–2023	3	1	2	0	0	0	33.33
MI	2008–2023	19	9	9	0	1	0	50.00
PWI^{†}	2011–2013	2	2	0	0	0	0	100.00
PBKS	2008–2023	21	14	7	0	0	0	66.66
RR	2008–2015, 2018–2023	20	11	9	0	0	0	50.00
RPS^{†}	2016–2017	4	1	3	0	0	0	25.00
RCB	2008–2022	21	11	9	1	0	1	54.76
Last updated: 15 April 2023 Note: Tie+W and Tie+L indicates matches tied and then won or lost by super over; The result percentage excludes no results and counts ties (irrespective of a tiebreaker) as half a win; The total matches does not include matches played for Champions League T20; †No longer exists.

== Result records ==
=== Greatest win margin (by runs) ===
Margin	Opposition	Venue	Date
118 runs	RCB	Rajiv Gandhi International Cricket Stadium, Hyderabad, India	31 March 2019
110 runs	KKR	Arun Jaitley Stadium, Delhi, India	25 May 2025
88 runs	DC	Dubai International Stadium, Dubai, UAE	27 October 2020
85 runs	MI	Dr. Y. S. Rajasekhara Reddy ACA–VDCA Cricket Stadium, Visakhapatnam, India	8 May 2016
69 runs	KXIP	Dubai International Stadium, Dubai, UAE	8 October 2020
67 runs	DC	Arun Jaitley Stadium, Delhi, India	20 April 2024
Last Updated: 20 April 2024

=== Greatest win margin (by balls remaining) ===
Balls remaining	Margin	Opposition	Venue	Date
72	9 wickets	RCB	Brabourne Stadium, Mumbai, India	23 April 2022
62	10 wickets	LSG	Rajiv Gandhi International Cricket Stadium, Hyderabad, India	8 May 2024
37	6 wickets	DD	Rajiv Gandhi International Cricket Stadium, Hyderabad, India	4 May 2013
35	5 wickets	RCB	Sharjah Cricket Stadium, Sharjah, UAE	31 October 2020
31	10 wickets	GL	Saurashtra Cricket Association Stadium, Rajkot, India	21 April 2016
Last Updated: 8 May 2024

=== Greatest win margins (by wickets) ===
Margin	Opposition	Venue	Date
10 wickets	GL	Saurashtra Cricket Association Stadium, Rajkot, India	21 April 2016
10 wickets	MI	Sharjah Cricket Stadium, Sharjah, UAE	3 November 2020
10 wickets	LSG	Rajiv Gandhi International Cricket Stadium, Hyderabad, India	8 May 2024
9 wickets	GL	Rajiv Gandhi International Cricket Stadium, Hyderabad, India	9 April 2017
9 wickets	RR	Rajiv Gandhi International Cricket Stadium, Hyderabad, India	9 April 2018
9 wickets	DD	Arun Jaitley Stadium, Delhi, India	10 May 2018
9 wickets	KKR	Rajiv Gandhi International Cricket Stadium, Hyderabad, India	21 April 2019
9 wickets	KKR	M. A. Chidambaram Stadium, Chennai, India	21 April 2021
Last Updated: 8 May 2024

=== Narrowest win margin (by runs) ===
Margin	Opposition	Venue	Date
1 run	RR	Rajiv Gandhi International Cricket Stadium, Hyderabad, India	2 May 2024
2 runs	PBKS	Maharaja Yadavindra Singh International Cricket Stadium, Mullanpur, India	9 April 2024
3 runs	MI	Wankhede Stadium, Mumbai, India	17 May 2022
4 runs	DD	Dubai International Stadium, Dubai, UAE	25 April 2014
4 runs	RPS	Dr. Y.S. Rajasekhara Reddy ACA-VDCA Cricket Stadium, Visakhapatnam, India	10 May 2016
4 runs	RCB	Sheikh Zayed Cricket Stadium, Abu Dhabi, UAE	6 October 2021
Last Updated: 2 May 2024

=== Narrowest win margin (by balls remaining) ===
Balls remaining	Margin	Opposition	Venue	Date
0 ball	1 wicket	MI	Rajiv Gandhi International Cricket Stadium, Hyderabad, India	12 April 2018
1 ball	7 wickets	DD	Rajiv Gandhi International Cricket Stadium, Hyderabad, India	5 May 2018
2 balls	7 wickets	RCB	Rajiv Gandhi International Cricket Stadium, Hyderabad, India	20 May 2014
2 balls	6 wickets	CSK	JSCA International Stadium Complex, Ranchi, India	22 May 2014
2 balls	7 wickets	KXIP	Punjab Cricket Association Stadium, Mohali, India	15 May 2016
2 balls	6 wickets	RCB	Sheikh Zayed Stadium, Abu Dhabi, UAE	6 November 2020
Last Updated: 9 November 2020

=== Narrowest win margins (by wickets) ===
Margin	Opposition	Venue	Date
1 wicket	MI	Rajiv Gandhi International Cricket Stadium, Hyderabad, India	12 April 2018
3 wickets	DD	Arun Jaitley Stadium, Delhi, India	12 April 2013
4 wickets	GL	Arun Jaitley Stadium, Delhi, India	27 May 2016
4 wickets	RR	Sawai Mansingh Stadium, Jaipur, India	7 May 2023
Last Updated: 7 May 2023

=== Tied Matches ===
Opponent	Venue	Date
RCB	Rajiv Gandhi International Stadium, Hyderabad, India	7 April 2013
MI	Wankhede Stadium, Mumbai, India	2 May 2019
KKR	Sheikh Zayed Stadium, Abu Dhabi, UAE	18 October 2020
DC	Wankhede Stadium, Mumbai, India	25 April 2021
Last Updated: 25 April 2021

=== Greatest loss margin (by runs) ===
Margin	Opposition	Venue	Date
80 runs	KKR	Eden Gardens, Kolkata, India	3 April 2025
78 runs	CSK	M. A. Chidambaram Stadium, Chennai, India	28 April 2024
77 runs	CSK	Rajiv Gandhi International Cricket Stadium, Hyderabad, India	8 May 2013
72 runs	KXIP	Sharjah Cricket Stadium, Sharjah, UAE	22 April 2014
72 runs	RR	Rajiv Gandhi International Cricket Stadium, Hyderabad, India	2 April 2023
Last Updated: 3 April 2025

=== Greatest loss margin (by balls remaining) ===
Balls remaining	Margin	Opposition	Venue	Date
57	8 wickets	KKR	M. A. Chidambaram Stadium, Chennai, India	26 May 2024
38	8 wickets	KKR	Narendra Modi Stadium, Ahmedabad, India	21 May 2024
37	9 wickets	MI	Rajiv Gandhi International Cricket Stadium, Hyderabad, India	17 May 2015
34	4 wickets	KKR	Eden Gardens, Kolkata, India	24 May 2014
29	5 wickets	PBKS	Wankhede Stadium, Mumbai, India	22 May 2022
Last Updated: 26 May 2024

=== Greatest loss margins (by wickets) ===
Margin	Opposition	Venue	Date
9 wickets	MI	Rajiv Gandhi International Cricket Stadium, Hyderabad, India	17 May 2015
8 wickets	RR	Sawai Mansingh Stadium, Jaipur, India	27 April 2013
8 wickets	KKR	Rajiv Gandhi International Cricket Stadium, Hyderabad, India	16 April 2016
8 wickets	CSK	Maharashtra Cricket Association Stadium, Pune, India	13 May 2018
8 wickets	CSK	Wankhede Stadium, Mumbai, India	27 May 2018
8 wickets	DD	Dubai International Cricket Stadium, Dubai, UAE	22 September 2021
Last Updated: 10 October 2021

=== Narrowest loss margin (by runs) ===
Margin	Opposition	Venue	Date
4 runs	DD	ACA-VDCA Cricket Stadium, Visakhapatnam, India	18 April 2015
4 runs	CSK	Rajiv Gandhi International Cricket Stadium, Hyderabad, India	22 April 2018
4 runs	KKR	Eden Gardens, Kolkata, India	23 March 2024
5 runs	PBKS	Sharjah Cricket Stadium, Sharjah, UAE	25 September 2021
5 runs	KKR	Rajiv Gandhi International Cricket Stadium, Hyderabad, India	4 May 2023
Last Updated: 23 March 2024

=== Narrowest loss margin (by balls remaining) ===
Balls remaining	Margin	Opposition	Venue	Date
0 balls	6 wickets	RR	ACA-VDCA Cricket Stadium, Visakhapatnam, India	16 April 2015
0 balls	6 wickets	DD	Shaheed Veer Narayan Singh International Cricket Stadium, Raipur, India	20 May 2016
0 balls	6 wickets	RPS	Maharashtra Cricket Association Stadium, Pune, India	22 April 2017
0 balls	5 wickets	GT	Wankhede Stadium, Mumbai, India	27 April 2022
1 ball	4 wickets	RCB	M. Chinnaswamy Stadium, Bangalore, India	4 May 2014
1 ball	6 wickets	RCB	Rajiv Gandhi International Cricket Stadium, Hyderabad, India	15 May 2015
1 ball	6 wickets	KXIP	Punjab Cricket Association Stadium, Mohali, India	8 April 2019
1 ball	6 wickets	CSK	M. A. Chidambaram Stadium, Chennai, India	23 April 2019
1 ball	2 wickets	DD	ACA-VDCA Cricket Stadium, Visakhapatnam, India	8 May 2019
1 ball	5 wickets	RR	Dubai International Stadium, Dubai, UAE	11 October 2020
Last Updated: 27 April 2022

=== Narrowest loss margins (by wickets) ===
Margin	Opposition	Venue	Date
2 wickets	CSK	Wankhede Stadium, Mumbai, India	22 May 2018
2 wickets	DD	ACA-VDCA Cricket Stadium, Visakhapatnam, India	8 May 2019
4 wickets	RR	Arun Jaitley Stadium, Delhi, India	22 May 2013
4 wickets	RR	Sheikh Zayed Stadium, Abu Dhabi, UAE	18 April 2014
4 wickets	RCB	M. Chinnaswamy Stadium, Bangalore, India	4 May 2014
4 wickets	KKR	Eden Gardens, Kolkata, India	24 May 2014
4 wickets	MI	Wankhede Stadium, Mumbai, India	12 April 2017
4 wickets	RCB	M. Chinnaswamy Stadium, Bangalore, India	4 May 2019
Last Updated: 22 October 2020

== Team scoring records ==
=== Highest Totals ===
Score	Opposition	Venue	Date
287/3	RCB	M. Chinnaswamy Stadium, Bengaluru, India	15 April 2024
286/6	RR	Rajiv Gandhi International Cricket Stadium, Hyderabad, India	23 March 2025
278/2	KKR	Arun Jaitley Stadium, Delhi, India	25 May 2025
277/3	MI	Rajiv Gandhi International Cricket Stadium, Hyderabad, India	27 March 2024
266/7	DC	Arun Jaitley Stadium, Delhi, India	20 April 2024
Last updated: 23 March 2022

=== Lowest Totals ===
Score	Opposition	Venue	Date
86	GT	Narendra Modi Stadium, Ahmedabad	12 May 2026
96	MI	Rajiv Gandhi International Cricket Stadium, Hyderabad	6 April 2019
113	MI	Rajiv Gandhi International Cricket Stadium, Hyderabad	17 May 2015
114	KXIP	Dubai International Stadium, Dubai, UAE	24 October 2020
115/8	KKR	Dubai International Stadium, Dubai, UAE	3 October 2021
Last updated: 12 May 2026

=== Highest Totals Conceded ===
Score	Opposition	Venue	Date
262/7	RCB	M. Chinnaswamy Stadium, Bangalore, India	15 April 2024
246/5	MI	Rajiv Gandhi International Cricket Stadium, Hyderabad, India	27 March 2024
245/6	PBKS	Rajiv Gandhi International Cricket Stadium, Hyderabad, India	12 April 2025
243/5	MI	Wankhede Stadium, Mumbai	29 April 2026
242/6	RR	Rajiv Gandhi International Cricket Stadium, Hyderabad	23 March 2025
Last updated: 15 April 2024

=== Lowest Totals Conceded ===
Score	Opposition	Venue	Date
68	RCB	Brabourne Stadium, Mumbai, India	23 April 2022
80	DD	Rajiv Gandhi International Cricket Stadium, Hyderabad, India	4 May 2013
87	MI	Wankhede Stadium, Mumbai, India	24 April 2018
92	MI	ACA-VDCA Cricket Stadium, Visakhapatnam, India	8 May 2016
102	RR	Sardar Patel Stadium, Ahmedabad, India	8 May 2014
Last updated: 23 April 2022

=== Highest match aggregate ===
Aggregate	Team 1	Team 2	Venue	Date
549/10	SRH (287/3)	RCB (262/7)	M. Chinnaswamy Stadium, Bangalore, India	15 April 2024
528/12	SRH (286/6)	RR (242/6)	Rajiv Gandhi International Cricket Stadium,Hyderabad, India	23 March 2025
523/8	SRH (277/3)	MI (246/5)	Rajiv Gandhi International Cricket Stadium,Hyderabad, India	27 March 2024
492/8	PBKS (245/6)	SRH (247/2)	Rajiv Gandhi International Cricket Stadium,Hyderabad, India	12 April 2025
465/17	SRH (266/7)	DC (199)	Arun Jaitley Stadium, Delhi, India	20 April 2024
Last updated: 20 April 2024

=== Lowest match aggregate ===
Aggregate	Team 1	Team 2	Venue	Date
140/11	RCB (68)	SRH (72/1)	Brabourne Stadium, Mumbai, India	23 April 2022
161/14	DD (80)	SRH (81/4)	Rajiv Gandhi International Cricket Stadium, Hyderabad, India	4 May 2013
176/10	SRH (128/7)	KKR (48/3)	M. Chinnaswamy Stadium, Bangalore, India	17 May 2017
187/9	DD (143/7)	SRH (44/2)	Arun Jaitley Stadium, Delhi, India	10 May 2014
205/20	SRH (118)	MI (87)	Wankhede Stadium, Mumbai, India	24 April 2018
Last updated: 23 April 2022

== Individual Records (Batting) ==
=== Most runs ===
Rank	Runs	Player	Matches	Innings	Period
1	4,014	David Warner	95	95	2014-2024
2	2,518	Shikhar Dhawan	85	85	2013-2018
4	2,291	Abhishek Sharma	82	79	2019–2026
3	2,101	Kane Williamson	76	75	2015–2022
5	1,638	Heinrich Klaasen	47	44	2023–2026
Last Updated: 25 April 2026

=== Fastest runs getter ===
Runs	Batsman	Innings	Record Date	Reference
1,000	Jonny Bairstow	26	25 April 2021	
1,000	David Warner	26	11 May 2015	
2,000	David Warner	47	9 April 2017	
3,000	David Warner	67	17 April 2019	
4,000	David Warner	93	28 April 2021	

=== Highest individual score ===
Rank	Runs	Player	Opposition	Location	Date
1	141	Abhishek Sharma	PBKS	Rajiv Gandhi International Cricket Stadium, Hyderabad, India	12 April 2025
1	135*	Abhishek Sharma	DC	Rajiv Gandhi International Cricket Stadium, Hyderabad, India	21 April 2026
3	126	David Warner	KKR	Rajiv Gandhi International Cricket Stadium, Hyderabad, India	30 April 2017
4	114	Jonny Bairstow	RCB	Rajiv Gandhi International Cricket Stadium, Hyderabad, India	31 March 2019
5	106*	Ishan Kishan	RR	Rajiv Gandhi International Cricket Stadium, Hyderabad, India	23 March 2025
Last Updated: 23 March 2025

=== Highest career average ===
Rank	Average	Player	Innings	Not out	Runs	Period
1	49.55	David Warner	95	14	4,014	2014-2021
2	44.27	Heinrich Klaasen	44	7	1,638	2023–2026
3	41.52	Jonny Bairstow	28	3	1,038	2019–2021
4	38.25	Nicholas Pooran	13	5	306	2022-2022
5	37.00	Ishan Kishan	21	3	666	2025-2026
Qualification: 10 innings. Last Updated: 25 April 2026

=== Highest strike rates ===
Rank	Strike rate	Player	Runs	Balls Faced	Period
1	178.19	Travis Head	1,005	564	2024–2026
2	170.75	Heinrich Klaasen	1,559	913	2023–2026
3	162.58	Abhishek Sharma	1,808	1,112	2019–2026
4	144.48	Rahul Tripathi	851	589	2022–2024
5	142.59	David Warner	4,014	2,815	2014–2021
Qualification= 500 balls faced. Last Updated: 9 April 2026

=== Most half-centuries ===
Rank	Half-centuries	Player	Innings	Period
1	40	David Warner	95	2014-2020
2	19	Shikhar Dhawan	85	2013-2018
3	18	Kane Williamson	75	2015-2022
4	12	Abhishek Sharma	79	2019-2026
4	12	Manish Pandey	47	2018–2021
Last Updated: 25 April 2026

=== Most centuries ===
Rank	Centuries	Player	Innings	Period
1	2	Heinrich Klaasen	51	2023-2025
1	2	Abhishek Sharma	83	2019-206
1	2	David Warner	95	2014–2021
2	1	Ishan Kishan	20	2023–2025
2	1	Travis Head	15	2024-2024
2	1	Harry Brook	11	2023-2023
2	1	Jonny Bairstow	28	2019–2021
Last Updated: 21 April 2026

=== Most Sixes ===
Rank	Sixes	Player	Innings	Period
1	144	Abhishek Sharma	92	2019–2026
2	143	David Warner	95	2014–2021
3	111	Heinrich Klaasen	51	2023–2026
4	69	Travis Head	39	2024–2026
5	64	Kane Williamson	75	2015-2022
Last Updated: 12 May 2026

=== Most Fours ===
Rank	Fours	Player	Innings	Period
1	379	David Warner	95	2014-2021
2	294	Shikhar Dhawan	85	2013-2018
3	214	Abhishek Sharma	83	2019–2026
4	181	Kane Williamson	75	2015–2022
5	152	Travis Head	39	2024–2026
Last Updated: 12 May 2026

=== Highest strike rates in an innings ===
Rank	Strike rate	Player	Score	Opposition	Venue	Date
1	416.66	Shashank Singh	25* (6)	GT	Wankhede Stadium, Mumbai, India	27 April 2022
2	383.33	Abhishek Sharma	46 (12)	DC	Arun Jaitley Stadium, Delhi, India	20 April 2024
3	370.00	Abdul Samad	37* (10)	RCB	M. Chinnaswamy Stadium, Bengaluru, India	15 April 2024
4	357.14	Glenn Phillips	25 (7)	RR	Sawai Mansingh Stadium, Jaipur, India	7 May 2023
5	340.00	Rashid Khan	34* (10)	KKR	Eden Gardens, Kolkata, India	25 May 2018
Qualification: Minimum 25 runs. Last Updated: 20 April 2024

=== Most sixes in an innings ===
Rank	Sixes	Player	Opposition	Venue	Date
1	10	Abhishek Sharma	PBKS	Rajiv Gandhi International Cricket Stadium, Hyderabad, India	12 April 2025
1	10	Abhishek Sharma	DC	Rajiv Gandhi International Cricket Stadium, Hyderabad, India	21 April 2026
2	8	David Warner	KKR	Rajiv Gandhi International Cricket Stadium, Hyderabad, India	30 April 2017
2	8	Manish Pandey	RR	Dubai International Stadium, Dubai, UAE	22 October 2020
2	8	Heinrich Klaasen	KKR	Eden Gardens, Kolkata, India	23 March 2024
2	8	Travis Head	RCB	M. Chinnaswamy Stadium, Bengaluru, India	15 April 2024
2	8	Nitish Kumar Reddy	RR	Rajiv Gandhi International Cricket Stadium, Hyderabad, India	2 May 2024
2	8	Travis Head	LSG	Rajiv Gandhi International Cricket Stadium, Hyderabad, India	8 May 2024
Last Updated: 8 May 2024

=== Most fours in an innings ===
Rank	Fours	Player	Opposition	Venue	Date
1	14	Abhishek Sharma	PBKS	Rajiv Gandhi International Cricket Stadium, Hyderabad, India	12 April 2025
2	13	Shikhar Dhawan	RR	Rajiv Gandhi International Cricket Stadium, Hyderabad, India	9 April 2018
3	12	David Warner	CSK	JSCA International Stadium Complex, Ranchi, India	22 May 2014
3	12	Jonny Bairstow	RCB	Rajiv Gandhi International Cricket Stadium, Hyderabad, India	31 March 2019
3	12	Wriddhiman Saha	DD	Dubai International Stadium, Dubai, UAE	27 October 2020
3	12	Harry Brook	KKR	Eden Gardens, Kolkata, India	14 April 2023
3	12	Abhishek Sharma	DD	Arun Jaitley Stadium, Delhi, India	29 April 2023
Last Updated: 29 April 2023

=== Most runs in a season ===
Rank	Runs	Player	Matches	Innings	Season
1	848	David Warner	17	17	2016
2	735	Kane Williamson	17	17	2018
3	692	David Warner	12	12	2019
4	641	David Warner	14	14	2017
5	567	Travis Head	15	15	2024
Last Updated: 26 May 2024

=== Most ducks ===
Rank	Ducks	Player	Innings	Period
1	9	Rashid Khan	35	2017-2021
2	5	Bhuvneshwar Kumar	49	2014–2024
2	5	Travis Head	39	2024-2026
2	5	Abhishek Sharma	82	2019-2026
4	4	Sandeep Sharma	12	2018–2021
Last Updated: 13 April 2026

== Individual Records (bowling) ==
=== Most career wickets ===
Rank	Wickets	Player	Matches	Innings	Period
1	157	Bhuvneshwar Kumar †	145	145	2014-2024
2	93	Rashid Khan	76	76	2017-2021
3	65	T Natarajan †	55	55	2020-2024
3	52	Siddarth Kaul	43	43	2017-2021
5	41	Sandeep Sharma	43	43	2018-2021
Last Updated: 26 May 2024

=== Best figures in an innings ===
Rank	Figures	Player	Opposition	Venue	Date
1	5/19	Bhuvneshwar Kumar	KXIP	Rajiv Gandhi International Cricket Stadium, Hyderabad, India	17 April 2017
2	5/25	Umran Malik	GT	Wankhede Stadium, Mumbai, India	27 April 2022
3	5/30	Bhuvneshwar Kumar	GT	Narendra Modi Stadium, Ahmedabad, India	15 May 2023
4	4/11	Mohammad Nabi	RCB	Rajiv Gandhi International Cricket Stadium, Hyderabad, India	31 March 2019
5	4/14	Bhuvneshwar Kumar	RR	Sardar Patel Stadium, Ahmedabad, India	8 May 2014
Last Updated: 15 May 2023

=== Best career average ===
Rank	Average	Player	Wickets	Runs	Balls	Period
1	16.61	Jason Holder	31	515	377	2014-2013
2	20.55	Rashid Khan	93	1,912	1,812	2017-2021
3	22.27	Eshan Malinga	29	646	414	2025-2026
4	23.29	Ashish Nehra	17	396	283	2016–2017
5	24.56	Khaleel Ahmed	32	786	543	2018–2021
Qualification: 250 balls. Last Updated: 12 May 2026

=== Best career economy rate ===
Rank	Economy rate	Player	Wickets	Runs	Balls	Period
1	6.33	Rashid Khan	93	1,912	1,812	2017-2021
2	6.89	Dale Steyn	33	985	857	2013-2015
3	7.13	Mohammad Nabi	13	408	343	2017-2021
4	7.14	Mustafizur Rahman	17	455	382	2016-2017
5	7.37	Amit Mishra	28	734	597	2013-2014
Qualification: 250 balls. Last Updated: 10 October 2021

=== Best career strike rate ===
Rank	Strike rate	Player	Wickets	Runs	Balls	Period
1	12.16	Jason Holder	31	515	377	2014-2021
2	14.27	Eshan Malinga	29	646	414	2025-2026
3	16.64	Ashish Nehra	17	396	283	2016–2017
4	16.96	Khaleel Ahmed	32	786	543	2018–2021
5	17.00	Umran Malik	29	772	493	2021–2024
Qualification: 250 balls. Last Updated: 12 May 2026

=== Most four-wickets (& over) hauls in an innings ===
Rank	Four-wicket hauls	Player	Innings	Balls	Wickets	Period
1	4	Bhuvneshwar Kumar	145	3,268	157	2014-2024
2	2	Harshal Patel	16	409	16	2025-2026
2	2	Umran Malik	26	493	29	2021–2024
3	1	12 Players.				
Last Updated: 29 April 2026

=== Best economy rates in an innings ===
Rank	Economy	Player	Overs	Runs	Wickets	Opposition	Venue	Date
1	1.75	Rashid Khan	4	7	3	DD	Dubai International Stadium, Dubai, UAE	27 October 2020
2	2.00	Karn Sharma	4	8	0	CSK	M. A. Chidambaram Stadium, Chennai, India	25 April 2013
2	2.00	Amit Mishra	4	8	2	RR	Rajiv Gandhi International Cricket Stadium, Hyderabad, India	17 May 2013
4	2.25	Mustafizur Rahman	4	9	2	KXIP	Rajiv Gandhi International Cricket Stadium, Hyderabad, India	23 April 2016
5	2.50	Hanuma Vihari	2	5	0	KXIP	Punjab Cricket Association Stadium, Mohali, India	11 May 2013
Qualification: 12 balls bowled. Last Updated: 28 October 2020

=== Best strike rates in an innings ===
Rank	Strike rate	Player	Balls	Runs	Wickets	Opposition	Venue	Date
1	3.00	Moises Henriques	6	3	2	RCB	Rajiv Gandhi International Cricket Stadium, Hyderabad, India	15 May 2015
1	3.00	Abhishek Sharma	6	4	2	MI	Sheikh Zayed Cricket Stadium, Abu Dhabi, UAE	8 October 2021
3	4.80	Bhuvneshwar Kumar	24	19	5	KXIP	Rajiv Gandhi International Cricket Stadium, Hyderabad, India	17 April 2017
3	4.80	Umran Malik	24	25	5	GT	Wankhede Stadium, Mumbai, India	27 April 2022
3	4.80	Bhuvneshwar Kumar	24	30	5	GT	Narendra Modi Stadium, Ahmedabad, India	15 May 2023
Qualification: Minimum 2 wickets. Last Updated: 15 May 2023.

=== Most runs conceded in a match ===
Rank	Figures	Player	Overs	Opposition	Venue	Date
1	0/70	Basil Thampi	4	RCB	M. Chinnaswamy Stadium, Bangalore, India	17 May 2018
2	0/66	Ishant Sharma	4	CSK	Rajiv Gandhi International Cricket Stadium, Hyderabad, India	8 May 2013
3	2/64	Siddarth Kaul	4	MI	Sharjah Cricket Stadium, Sharjah, UAE	4 October 2020
4	0/63	Marco Jansen	4	GT	Wankhede Stadium, Mumbai, India	27 April 2022
5	0/60	T Natarajan	4	MI	Wankhede Stadium, Mumbai, India	17 May 2022
5	0/60	Bhuvneshwar Kumar	4	RCB	M. Chinnaswamy Stadium, Bengaluru, India	15 April 2024
Last updated: 15 April 2024

=== Most wickets in a season ===
Rank	Wickets	Player	Innings	Season
1	26	Bhuvneshwar Kumar	14	2017
2	23	Bhuvneshwar Kumar	17	2016
3	22	Umran Malik	14	2022
4	21	Amit Mishra	17	2013
4	21	Rashid Khan	17	2018
4	21	Siddarth Kaul	17	2018
Last Updated: 22 October 2023

=== Hat-trick ===
S. No	Bowler	Against	Wickets	Venue	Date	Ref.
1	Amit Mishra	PWI	Bhuvneshwar Kumar (lbw); Rahul Sharma (b); Ashok Dinda (b)	Maharashtra Cricket Association Stadium, Pune, India	17 April 2013	
Last Updated: 22 October 2020

== Individual Records (Wicket-keeping) ==
=== Most career dismissals ===
Rank	Dismissals	Player	Matches	Innings	Period
1	38	Naman Ojha	56	56	2014-2017
2	22	Jonny Bairstow	28	25	2019-2021
3	20	Heinrich Klaasen	54	38	2023–2026
4	19	Wriddhiman Saha	29	29	2018–2021
5	12	Ishan Kishan	26	13	2025–2026
Last updated: 12 May 2026

=== Most career catches ===
Rank	Catches	Player	Matches	Innings	Period
1	36	Naman Ojha	56	56	2014-2017
2	18	Jonny Bairstow	28	25	2019-2021
3	17	Heinrich Klaasen	54	38	2023–2026
4	16	Wriddhiman Saha	29	29	2018–2021
5	11	Ishan Kishan	26	13	2025–2026
Last updated: 12 May 2026

=== Most career stumpings ===
Rank	Stumpings	Player	Matches	Innings	Period
1	4	Jonny Bairstow	28	25	2019-2021
2	3	Parthiv Patel	13	13	2013-2013
2	3	Heinrich Klaasen	28	28	2023-2024
2	3	Wriddhiman Saha	29	29	2018-2021
5	2	Naman Ojha	56	56	2014-2017
Last updated: 26 May 2024

=== Most dismissals in an innings ===
Rank	Dismissals	Player	Opposition	Venue	Date
1	4	Ishan Kishan	DC	Rajiv Gandhi International Cricket Stadium, Hyderabad	5 May 2025
1	4	Naman Ojha	MI	ACA-VDCA Cricket Stadium, Visakhapatnam, India	8 May 2016
2	3	Naman Ojha	RPS	ACA-VDCA Cricket Stadium, Visakhapatnam, India	10 May 2016
2	3	Jonny Bairstow	DD	Punjab Cricket Association Stadium, Mohali, India	10 March 2010
2	3	Nicholas Pooran	RCB	Brabourne Stadium, Mumbai, India	23 April 2022
Last Updated: 23 April 2022

=== Most dismissals in a season ===
Rank	Dismissals	Player	Matches	Innings	Season
1	18	Naman Ojha	17	17	2016
2	11	Jonny Bairstow	10	10	2019
3	9	Nicholas Pooran	14	14	2022
4	8	Parthiv Patel	13	13	2013
4	8	Jonny Bairstow	11	10	2020
Last Updated: 25 October 2022

== Individual Records (Fielding) ==
=== Most career catches ===
Rank	Catches	Player	Matches	Innings	Period
1	46	David Warner	95	95	2014-2021
2	39	Kane Williamson	76	76	2015-2022
3	38	Shikhar Dhawan	85	85	2013-2018
4	29	Bhuvneshwar Kumar	136	136	2014–2024
5	29	Abhishek Sharma	86	86	2019–2026
Last Updated: 12 May 2026

=== Most catches in an innings ===
Rank	Dismissals	Player	Opposition	Venue	Date
1	5	Mohammad Nabi	MI	Sheikh Zayed Cricket Stadium, Abu Dhabi, UAE	8 October 2021
2	4	Abhishek Sharma	CSK	M. A. Chidambaram Stadium, Chennai, India	25 April 2025
3	3	Cameron White	PWI	Rajiv Gandhi International Cricket Stadium, Hyderabad, India	5 April 2013
3	3	Deepak Hooda	KXIP	Punjab Cricket Association Stadium, Mohali, India	28 April 2017
3	3	Rashid Khan	KKR	Rajiv Gandhi International Cricket Stadium, Hyderabad, India	30 April 2017
3	3	Manish Pandey	KKR	Rajiv Gandhi International Cricket Stadium, Hyderabad, India	19 May 2018
3	3	Deepak Hooda	RCB	Rajiv Gandhi International Cricket Stadium, Hyderabad, India	31 March 2019
3	3	Deepak Hooda	KXIP	Punjab Cricket Association Stadium, Mohali, India	8 April 2019
3	3	Aiden Markram	MI	Rajiv Gandhi International Cricket Stadium, Hyderabad, India	18 April 2023
3	3	Abdul Samad	RCB	Rajiv Gandhi International Cricket Stadium, Hyderabad, India	25 April 2024
3	3	Marco Jansen	RR	Rajiv Gandhi International Cricket Stadium, Hyderabad, India	2 May 2024
Last Updated: 25 April 2025

=== Most catches in a series ===
Rank	Catches	Player	Matches	Innings	Season
1	12	Shikhar Dhawan	16	16	2018
1	12	David Warner	16	16	2020
3	11	Aiden Markram	13	13	2023
3	11	Moises Henriques	17	17	2016
5	10	Deepak Hooda	11	11	2019
5	10	Cameron White	13	13	2013
5	10	Kane Williamson	13	13	2022
5	10	David Warner	14	14	2017
5	10	Vijay Shankar	15	15	2019
Last Updated: 9 November 2023

== Individual Records (Other) ==
=== Most matches ===
Rank	Matches	Player	Period
1	145	Bhuvneshwar Kumar	2014-2024
2	95	David Warner	2014-2021
3	86	Abhishek Sharma	2019-2026
4	85	Shikhar Dhawan	2013–2018
5	76	Rashid Khan	2017–2021
5	76	Kane Williamson	2015–2022
Last Updated: 12 May 2026

== Partnership Record ==
=== Highest partnerships by wicket ===
Wicket	Runs	First batsman	Second batsman	Opposition	Venue	Date
1st	185	Jonny Bairstow	David Warner	RCB	Rajiv Gandhi International Cricket Stadium, Hyderabad	31 March 2019
2nd	176*	Shikhar Dhawan	Kane Williamson	DD	Arun Jaitley Stadium, Delhi, India	10 May 2018
3rd	140*	Vijay Shankar	Manish Pandey	RR	Dubai International Stadium, Dubai, UAE	22 October 2020
4th	116*	Aiden Markram	Heinrich Klaasen	MI	Rajiv Gandhi International Cricket Stadium, Hyderabad	27 March 2024
5th	116	Nitish Kumar Reddy	Heinrich Klaasen	LSG	Rajiv Gandhi International Cricket Stadium, Hyderabad	5 April 2026
6th	99	Abhinav Manohar	Heinrich Klaasen	MI	Rajiv Gandhi International Cricket Stadium, Hyderabad	23 April 2025
7th	58	Darren Sammy	Amit Mishra	RR	Sawai Mansingh Stadium, Jaipur	27 April 2013
8th	68	Heinrich Klaasen	Bhuvneshwar Kumar	GT	Narendra Modi Stadium, Ahmedabad	15 May 2023
9th	37*	Pat Cummins	Sanvir Singh	MI	Wankhede Stadium, Mumbai	6 May 2024
10th	33	Pat Cummins	Vijayakanth Viyaskanth	KKR	Narendra Modi Stadium, Ahmedabad	21 May 2024
Last Updated: 5 April 2026

=== Highest partnerships by runs ===
Wicket	runs	First batsman	Second batsman	Opposition	Venue	Date
1st Wicket	185	David Warner	Jonny Bairstow	RCB	Rajiv Gandhi International Cricket Stadium, Hyderabad, India	31 March 2019
2nd Wicket	176*	Kane Williamson	Shikhar Dhawan	DD	Arun Jaitley Stadium, Delhi, India	10 May 2018
1st Wicket	167*	Travis Head	Abhishek Sharma	LSG	Rajiv Gandhi International Cricket Stadium, Hyderabad, India	8 May 2024
1st Wicket	160	David Warner	Jonny Bairstow	KXIP	Dubai International Stadium, Dubai, UAE	20 October 2020
1st Wicket	151*	David Warner	Wriddhiman Saha	MI	Sharjah Cricket Stadium, Sharjah, UAE	3 November 2020
Last Updated: 8 May 2024

== Awards ==
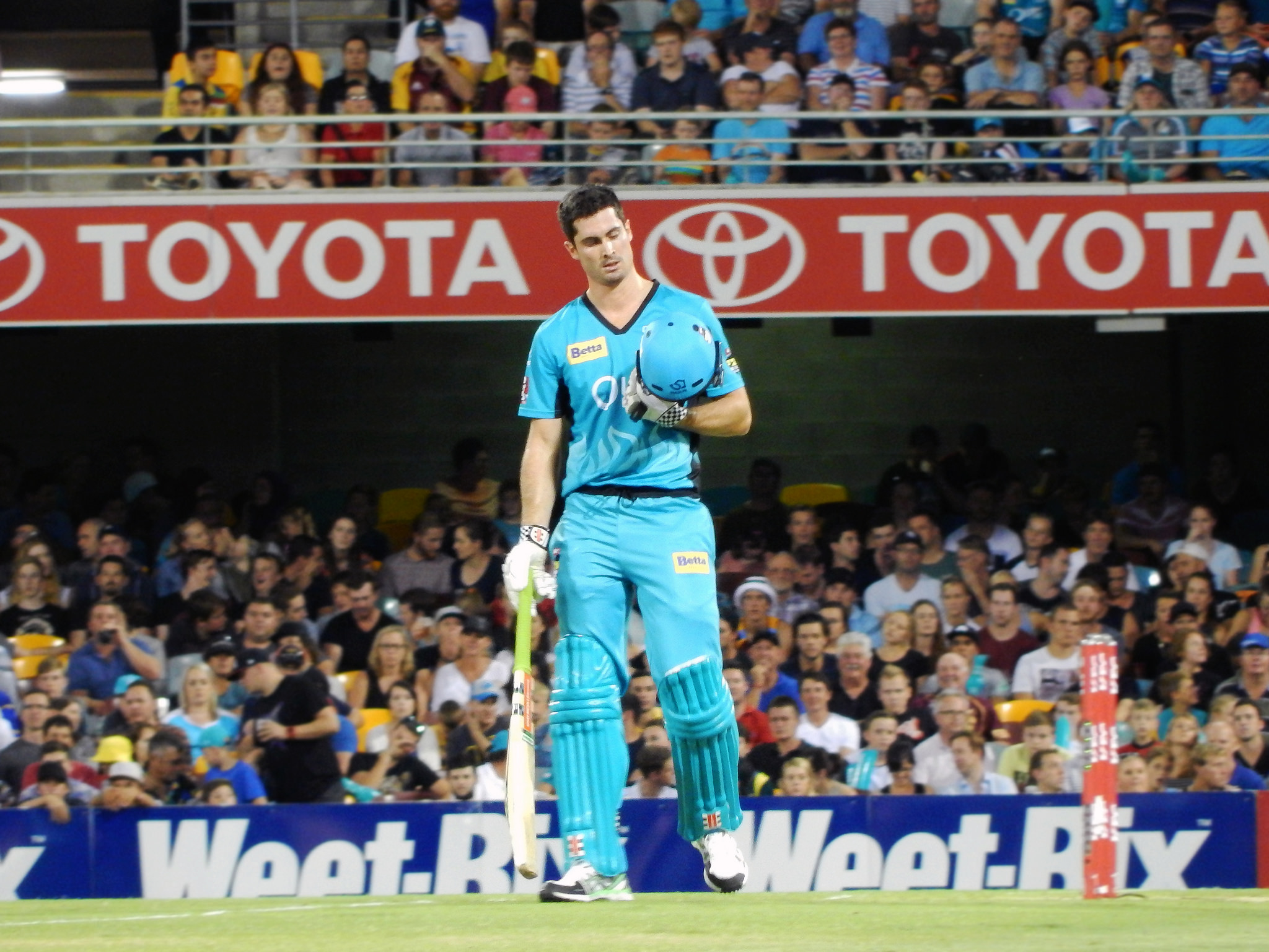
Ben Cutting was the player of the match for IPL 9 Final

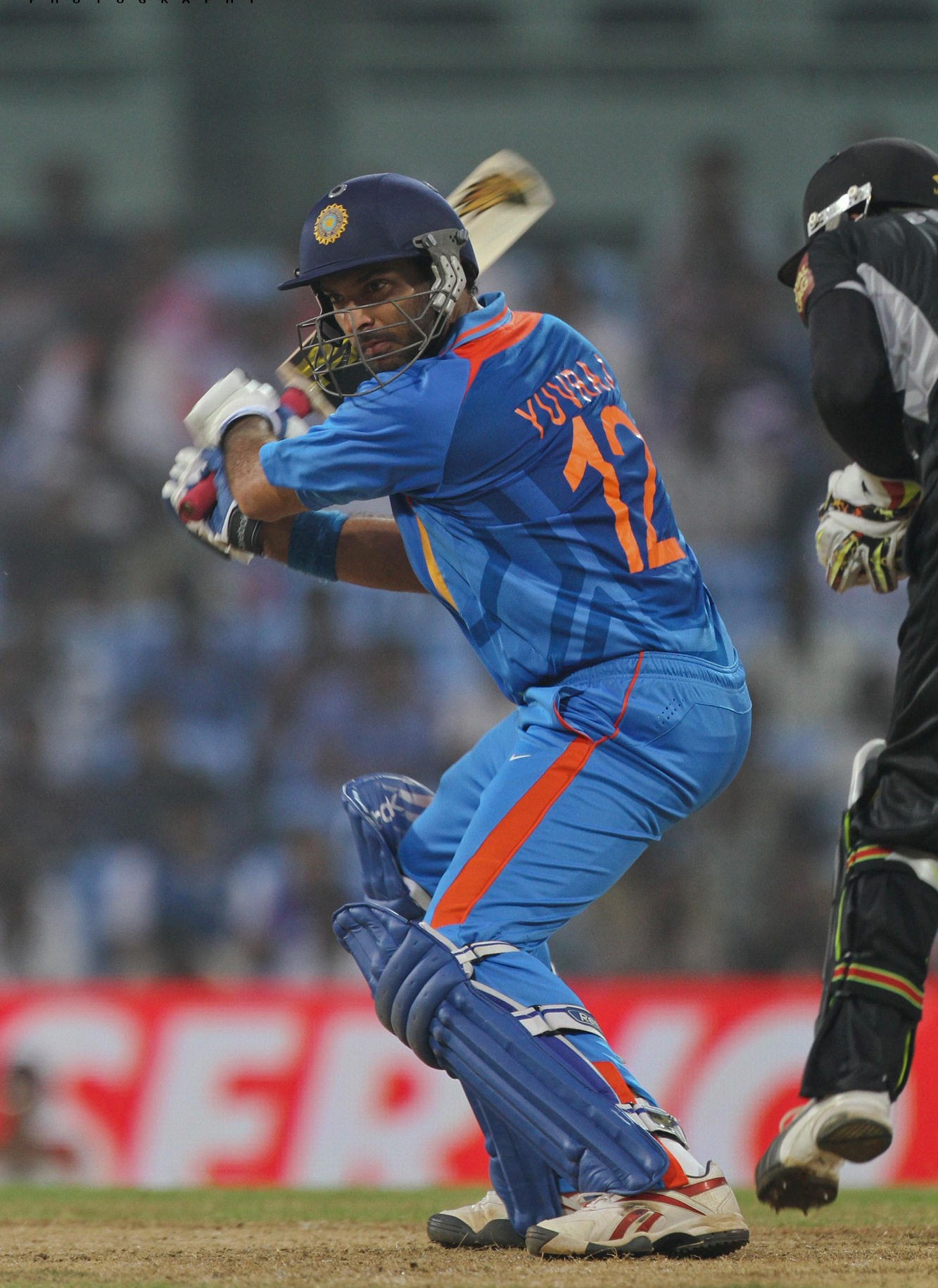
Yuvraj Singh awarded Vitara Brezza Glam Shot of the season for IPL 10

=== Orange cap ===
Note: Orange cap winners are the players with most runs in a season

Season	Player	Mat	Runs	Ref
2015	David Warner	14	562	
2017	David Warner	14	641	
2018	Kane Williamson	17	735	
2019	David Warner	12	692	

=== Purple cap ===
Note: Purple cap winners are the players with most wickets in a season

Season	Player	Mat	Wickets	Ref
2016	Bhuvneshwar Kumar	17	23	
2017	Bhuvneshwar Kumar	14	26	

=== Player of the match (final) ===
Season	Player of the match	Opponent	Venue	Result	Contribution	Ref
2016	Ben Cutting	RCB	Bengaluru	Won by 8 Runs	39* (15) & 2/35 (4 overs)	

=== IPL Fair Play Award ===
Note: The Fair Play Award is given after each season to the team with the best record of fair play.

Winners (2): 2016, 2019

=== Miscellaneous Awards ===
2016 Indian Premier League

- Emerging player of the season: Mustafizur Rahman
- Vitara Brezza Glam Shot of the Season: David Warner

2017 Indian Premier League

- Vitara Brezza Glam Shot of the Season: Yuvraj Singh
