= List of Indian Premier League awards =

The Indian Premier League (IPL) is a Twenty20 cricket competition based in India. The tournament honours players with several awards at the end of each season. These include the Orange Cap, Purple Cap, Maximum Sixes Award, Most Valuable Player and Emerging Player of the Year, among others.

== Orange Cap ==
The Orange Cap is presented to the leading run scorer of each season of the Indian Premier League. It was introduced on 25 April 2008, a week after the start of the inaugural season of the IPL. The batsman with most runs in the tournament during the course of the season would wear the Orange Cap while fielding, with the overall leading run-scorer at the conclusion of the tournament winning the actual Orange Cap award on the day of the season's final. Brendon McCullum became the first player to wear the Orange Cap, and Shaun Marsh became the first winner of the award. So far David Warner has won the cap thrice followed by Chris Gayle and Virat Kohli who have won it twice. Kohli scored the most runs (973) in a single edition of the tournament in the 2016 season.

The then IPL chairman and commissioner Lalit Modi said of the initiative, "Cricket is often remembered and recorded as statistics and not by material distinctions. The DLF Indian Premier League will create a distinction for the best performing batsman, which will be cherished and valued by each player through this initiative. The purpose of this initiative is to be innovative, create another unique piece of history that sets the DLF Indian Premier League apart from the crowd, and to reward outstanding achievements by the players." Kane Williamson was the only non - opener to win Orange Cap.

Winners
Season	Player	Team	Runs	Ref
2008	Shaun Marsh	KXIP	616	
2009	Matthew Hayden	CSK	572	
2010	Sachin Tendulkar	MI	618	
2011	Chris Gayle	RCB	608	
2012	Chris Gayle	RCB	733	
2013	Michael Hussey	CSK	733	
2014	Robin Uthappa	KKR	660	
2015	David Warner	SRH	562	
2016	Virat Kohli	RCB	973	
2017	David Warner	SRH	641	
2018	Kane Williamson	SRH	735	
2019	David Warner	SRH	692	
2020	KL Rahul	KXIP	670	
2021	Ruturaj Gaikwad	CSK	635	
2022	Jos Buttler	RR	863	
2023	Shubman Gill	GT	890	
2024	Virat Kohli	RCB	741	
2025	Sai Sudharsan	GT	759	
2026	Vaibhav Sooryavanshi	RR	776	

== Purple Cap ==
The Purple Cap is presented to the leading wicket-taker in each season of the IPL. After the introduction of Orange Cap on 25 April 2008, the IPL announced the introduction of the Purple Cap on 13 May 2008. The bowler with most wickets in the tournament during the course of the season would wear the Purple Cap while fielding, with the overall leading wicket-taker at the conclusion of the tournament winning the actual Purple Cap award on the day of the season's final. In case of a tie, the bowler with superior economy rate would hold the Purple Cap. So far Bhuvneshwar Kumar, Dwayne Bravo, Harshal Patel and Kagiso Rabada have won the Purple Cap twice. Dwayne Bravo and Harshal Patel scalped 32 wickets in the 2013 Indian Premier League and 2021 Indian Premier League respectively, the most for any bowlers in a single edition of the tournament but Dwayne Bravo remains ahead of Harshal Patel because of better economy rate of the two as per the IPL rules.

The then IPL chairman and commissioner Lalit Modi said of the initiative, "We have seen over the course of the inaugural season of the League so far that bowlers have just as important a role to play in winning T20 matches as batsmen do."

Winners
Season	Player	Team	Wickets	Ref
2008	Sohail Tanvir	RR	22	
2009	R. P. Singh	DCH	23	
2010	Pragyan Ojha	DCH	21	
2011	Lasith Malinga	MI	28	
2012	Morne Morkel	DD	25	
2013	Dwayne Bravo	CSK	32	
2014	Mohit Sharma	CSK	23	
2015	Dwayne Bravo	CSK	26	
2016	Bhuvneshwar Kumar	SRH	23	
2017	Bhuvneshwar Kumar	SRH	26	
2018	Andrew Tye	KXIP	24	
2019	Imran Tahir	CSK	26	
2020	Kagiso Rabada	DC	30	
2021	Harshal Patel	RCB	32	
2022	Yuzvendra Chahal	RR	27	
2023	Mohammed Shami	GT	28	
2024	Harshal Patel	PBKS	24	
2025	Prasidh Krishna	GT	25	
2026	Kagiso Rabada	GT	29	

== Most sixes ==
The Maximum Sixes Award, called "Angel One Super Sixes of the Season" to be presented to the batsman who hit the most sixes in a season of the IPL.

Winners
Season	Player	Team	Sixes	Ref
2008	Sanath Jayasuriya	MI	31	
2009	Adam Gilchrist	DCH	29	
2010	Robin Uthappa	RCB	27	
2011	Chris Gayle	RCB	44	
2012	Chris Gayle	RCB	59	
2013	Chris Gayle	RCB	51	
2014	Glenn Maxwell	KXIP	36	
2015	Chris Gayle	RCB	38	
2016	Virat Kohli	RCB	38	
2017	Glenn Maxwell	KXIP	26	
2018	Rishabh Pant	DD	37	
2019	Andre Russell	KKR	52	
2020	Ishan Kishan	MI	30	
2021	KL Rahul	PBKS	30	
2022	Jos Buttler	RR	45	
2023	Faf du Plessis	RCB	36	
2024	Abhishek Sharma	SRH	42	
2025	Nicholas Pooran	LSG	40	
2026	Vaibhav Sooryavanshi	RR	72	

== Most fours ==
The award for the most fours in a season, called the "Rupay On-the-Go 4s of the Season" for sponsorship reasons, was introduced in 2022.

Winners
Season	Player	Team	Fours	Ref
2022	Jos Buttler	RR	83	
2023	Shubman Gill	GT	85	
2024	Travis Head	SRH	64	
2025	Sai Sudharsan	GT	88	
2026	Sai Sudharsan	GT	75	

== Most Valuable Player ==
Between 2008 and 2012, the "Man of the Tournament" was awarded, based on a traditional subjective assessment of performance. In 2013, this award was renamed to "Most Valuable Player" (MVP) and a cumulative points system was introduced. When batting, every six hit is worth 3.5 points, and every four is worth 2.5 points. Bowling earns 3.5 points per wicket taken, and 1 point per dot ball bowled. Catches taken and stumpings effected are valued at 2.5 points each. Some sources claim run outs are worth 1 point or 2.5 points.

Sunil Narine has won the award the most times (3), followed by Andre Russell & Shane Watson (2 each). Narine also holds the record for the most points scored during a single season (450).

Man of the Tournament
Season	Player	Team	Ref
2008	Shane Watson	RR	
2009	Adam Gilchrist	DCH	
2010	Sachin Tendulkar	MI	
2011	Chris Gayle	RCB	
2012	Sunil Narine	KKR	

Most Valuable Player
Season	Player	Team	Points	Ref
2013	Shane Watson	RR	386	
2014	Glenn Maxwell	KXIP	286	
2015	Andre Russell	KKR	312	
2016	Virat Kohli	RCB	356.5	
2017	Ben Stokes	RPS	279	
2018	Sunil Narine	KKR	379.5	
2019	Andre Russell	KKR	369	
2020	Jofra Archer	RR	307	
2021	Harshal Patel	RCB	264.5	
2022	Jos Buttler	RR	387	
2023	Shubman Gill	GT	343	
2024	Sunil Narine	KKR	450	
2025	Suryakumar Yadav	MI	320.5	
2026	Vaibhav Sooryavanshi	RR	436.5	

== Player of the final ==
Krunal Pandya is the only player to win Player of the match in final twice.

Winners
Season	Player of the match	Team	Ref
2008	Yusuf Pathan	RR	
2009	Anil Kumble	RCB	
2010	Suresh Raina	CSK	
2011	Murali Vijay	CSK	
2012	Manvinder Bisla	KKR	
2013	Kieron Pollard	MI	
2014	Manish Pandey	KKR	
2015	Rohit Sharma	MI	
2016	Ben Cutting	SRH	
2017	Krunal Pandya	MI	
2018	Shane Watson	CSK	
2019	Jasprit Bumrah	MI	
2020	Trent Boult	MI	
2021	Faf du Plessis	CSK	
2022	Hardik Pandya	GT	
2023	Devon Conway	CSK	
2024	Mitchell Starc	KKR	
2025	Krunal Pandya	RCB	
2026	Virat Kohli	RCB	

== Emerging player ==
The award was presented for the "best Under-19 player" in 2008 and the "best Under-23 player" in 2009 and 2010, being called "Under-23 Success of the Tournament". In the 2011 and 2012 seasons, the award was known as "Rising Star of the Year", while, in 2013, it was called "Best Young Player of the Season". Since 2014, the award has been called the Emerging Player of the Year. Only players who have played fewer than 5 Tests, 20 One Day Internationals, and 25 IPL matches at the start of the season are eligible for the award and can only win the award once.

The only non-Indian player to win the award is the Bangladeshi fast bowler Mustafizur Rahman, in 2016.

Winners
Season	Player	Team	Ref
2008	Shreevats Goswami	RCB	
2009	Rohit Sharma	DCH	
2010	Saurabh Tiwary	MI	
2011	Iqbal Abdulla	KKR	
2012	Mandeep Singh	KXIP	
2013	Sanju Samson	RR	
2014	Axar Patel	KXIP	
2015	Shreyas Iyer	DD	
2016	Mustafizur Rahman	SRH	
2017	Basil Thampi	GL	
2018	Rishabh Pant	DD	
2019	Shubman Gill	KKR	
2020	Devdutt Padikkal	RCB	
2021	Ruturaj Gaikwad	CSK	
2022	Umran Malik	SRH	
2023	Yashasvi Jaiswal	RR	
2024	Nitish Kumar Reddy	SRH	
2025	Sai Sudharsan	GT	
2026	Vaibhav Sooryavanshi	RR	

== Highest strike rate ==
Known as the "Super Striker of the Season Award" with sponsored car name, this award is given to the batsman with the highest strike rate of the season with a minimum of 100 balls and 7 matches played in the season. He is handed a car as well.

Winners
Season	Player	Team	Strike rate	Ref
2018	Sunil Narine	KKR	189.89	
2019	Andre Russell	KKR	204.8	
2020	Kieron Pollard	MI	191.42	
2021	Shimron Hetmyer	DC	168.05	
2022	Dinesh Karthik	RCB	183.33	
2023	Glenn Maxwell	RCB	183.48	
2024	Jake Fraser-McGurk	DC	234.04	
2025	Vaibhav Sooryavanshi	RR	206.55	
2026	Vaibhav Sooryavanshi	RR	237.30	

== Best catch ==
Best Catch, known as Herbalife Active Best Catch of the Season for sponsorship reasons, is given to the player who has taken the best catch during the season, on the basis of commentators' opinions and fan voting. So far, Suresh Raina and Kieron Pollard have won the award most times(2 times).

Winners
Season	Player	Team	Ref
2013	Gurkeerat Singh	KXIP	
2014	Kieron Pollard	MI	
2015	Dwyane Bravo	CSK	
2016	Suresh Raina	GL	
2017	Suresh Raina	GL	
2018	Trent Boult	DD	
2019	Kieron Pollard	MI	
2021	Ravi Bishnoi	PBKS	
2022	Evin Lewis	LSG	
2023	Rashid Khan	GT	
2024	Ramandeep Singh	KKR	
2025	Kamindu Mendis	SRH	
2026	Manish Pandey	KKR	

== Most Dot Balls ==
Season	Player	Team	No. of dot balls
2008	Shane Watson	RR	158
2009	R. P. Singh	DCH	172
2010	Dale Steyn	RCB	164
2011	Lasith Malinga	MI	183
2012	Praveen Kumar	PBKS	168
2013	Dale Steyn	SRH	211
2014	Axar Patel	PBKS	157
2015	Ashish Nehra	CSK	170
2016	Bhuvneshwar Kumar	SRH	156
2017	Sunil Narine	KKR	133
2018	Rashid Khan	SRH	167
2019	Deepak Chahar	CSK	190
2020	Jasprit Bumrah	MI	175
2021	Avesh Khan	DC	156
2022	Prasidh Krishna	RR	200
2023	Mohammed Shami	GT	193
2024	Jasprit Bumrah	MI	149
2025	Mohammed Siraj	GT	151
2026	Mohammed Siraj	GT	172

== Winning Captain ==
Rohit Sharma and MS Dhoni is most successful captains to have 5 Titles as captain. Rohit, Dhoni and Rajat Patidar are only three captain to win consecutive titles. KKR only team win Title with two different captains. Warne, Gilchrist and Warner are Overseas Captains to become Champions. Rajat Patidar is the only uncapped T20I player to have led RCB to their first 2 titles in the very first years of his captaincy.

Season	Winning Captain	Team
2008	Shane Warne	RR
2009	Adam Gilchrist	DCH
2010	MS Dhoni	CSK
2011	MS Dhoni	CSK
2012	Gautam Gambhir	KKR
2013	Rohit Sharma	MI
2014	Gautam Gambhir	KKR
2015	Rohit Sharma	MI
2016	David Warner	SRH
2017	Rohit Sharma	MI
2018	MS Dhoni	CSK
2019	Rohit Sharma	MI
2020	Rohit Sharma	MI
2021	MS Dhoni	CSK
2022	Hardik Pandya	GT
2023	MS Dhoni	CSK
2024	Shreyas Iyer	KKR
2025	Rajat Patidar	RCB
2026	Rajat Patidar	RCB

== Fair Play Award ==
The Fair Play Award is given after each season to the team with the best record of fair play. The Chennai Super Kings have won most frequently, with seven wins. The winner is decided on the basis of the points the umpires give to the teams. After each match, the two on-field umpires, and the third umpire, scores the performance of both of the teams. A team can be awarded a total of ten points per match, out of which four points are given on the basis of how the team has adhered to the "spirit of the game" in the opinion of the umpires. The other three criteria are based on the respect towards to the opposition, the laws of cricket and the umpires. Each of these three criteria represents two points. If a team gets two points in the criterion, its performance is considered as "good", whereas getting one or zero points indicates that its performance is "average" or "bad" respectively.

Winners
Season	Team
2008	Chennai Super Kings
2009	Kings XI Punjab
2010	Chennai Super Kings
2011	Chennai Super Kings
2012	Rajasthan Royals
2013	Chennai Super Kings
2014	Chennai Super Kings
2015	Chennai Super Kings
2016	Sunrisers Hyderabad
2017	Gujarat Lions
2018	Mumbai Indians
2019	Sunrisers Hyderabad
2020	Mumbai Indians
2021	Rajasthan Royals
2022	Gujarat Titans
2022	Rajasthan Royals
2023	Delhi Capitals
2024	Sunrisers Hyderabad
2025	Chennai Super Kings
2026	Punjab Kings

== See also ==
- List of Indian Premier League centuries
- List of Indian Premier League five-wicket hauls
- List of Indian Premier League records and statistics
