= 2016 Indian Premier League =

Cricket tournament

- Dates: 9 April 2016 – 29 May 2016
- Administrator: Board of Control for Cricket in India
- Cricket format: Twenty20
- Tournament format(s): Double round robin and playoffs
- Champions: Sunrisers Hyderabad (1st title)
- Runners-up: Royal Challengers Bangalore
- Participants: 8
- Matches: 60
- Most valuable player: Virat Kohli (RCB)
- Most runs: Virat Kohli (RCB) (973)
- Most wickets: Bhuvneshwar Kumar (SRH) (23)
- Official website: www.iplt20.com

The 2016 Indian Premier League season (also known as IPL 9, and branded as Vivo IPL 2016 for sponsorship reasons) was the ninth season of the Indian Premier League, a professional Twenty20 cricket league established by the Board of Control for Cricket in India (BCCI) in 2007. The season began on 9 April 2016 and concluded on 29 May 2016 with the playing of the finals match between Royal Challengers Bangalore and Sunrisers Hyderabad at M. Chinnaswamy Stadium in Bangalore.

The 2016 season was the first IPL season to use LED stumps. Following the suspension of Chennai Super Kings and Rajasthan Royals for two years over a spot-fixing and betting case during the 2013 IPL season, the IPL allocated spots for two new franchises to take their place. The process would result in the establishment of the Gujarat Lions and Rising Pune Supergiants.

The championship was won by Sunrisers Hyderabad, marking the Hyderabad franchise's second IPL title, with Ben Cutting declared the man of the match in the final. Virat Kohli of Royal Challengers Bangalore was named the most valuable player of the tournament, and Mustafizur Rahman of Sunrisers Hyderabad was named the emerging player of the season. Kohli was the tournament's leading run-scorer with 973 runs and Bhuvneshwar Kumar of Sunrisers Hyderabad was the leading wicket-taker of the tournament with 23 wickets. Ever since the introduction of Page playoff system, this is the only edition where a team ending outside of the top 2 at the end of league stage won an IPL title.

== Format ==
Eight teams contested the season. Two teams, Rising Pune Supergiants and Gujarat Lions, based in Pune and Rajkot were new to the tournament, replacing the Chennai Super Kings and Rajasthan Royals franchises which had been suspended until 2018.

The schedule for the tournament was published on 10 March 2016. The league stage, consisting of 56 matches, took place between 9 April and 22 May 2016. The top four teams qualified for the play-off stage, with the final being held in Bangalore on 29 May.

== Background ==
On 14 July 2015, the RM Lodha committee suspended the owners of the Chennai Super Kings and Rajasthan Royals franchises for a period of two years on charges of spot-fixing and betting during the 2013 IPL season. This meant that the two teams could not play in the 2016 and 2017 IPL seasons. The Board of Control of Cricket in India (BCCI) confirmed that two new teams will replace them for the next two seasons of the IPL.

In October 2015, PepsiCo withdrew as the title sponsor of the IPL, terminating a five-year deal which was to end in 2017. Chinese smartphone manufacturer Vivo was awarded the title sponsorship for the 2016 and 2017 seasons.

In November 2015, the BCCI shortlisted nine cities for the new franchises to be based in, leaving out Jaipur (home of Rajasthan Royals) and Kochi (home of the now defunct Kochi Tuskers Kerala) for unknown reasons. The nine cities shortlisted were: Chennai, Cuttack, Dharamshala, Indore, Nagpur, Pune, Rajkot, Ranchi and Visakhapatnam. The new franchises were allocated using a reverse auction process, with companies which bid the lowest share of the central revenue pool becoming the owners of the new teams. On 3 December, it was reported that twelve companies collected tender documents for the bidding process.

On 8 December 2015, it was announced that New Rising, a company led by Sanjiv Goenka, and Intex Technologies had won the bidding rights to the two new teams. New Rising decided to have their team based in Pune while Intex chose Rajkot as the home of its team. The two franchises picked five players each from the squads of Chennai Super Kings and Rajasthan Royals at a player draft on 15 December 2015. Each franchise was allocated a purse of ₹660 million to buy the players for their squad at the draft and players auction.

=== Maharashtra water crisis ===
On 6 April 2016, amid a severe drought situation in the state of Maharashtra, in which three venues (Mumbai, Pune and Nagpur) were supposed to host a total of 20 IPL matches in the 2016 season, the Bombay High Court questioned the "criminal wastage" of water being supplied to the three stadiums in a response to a petition from the Lok Satta Movement NGO. The drought was described as one of the "worst-ever droughts" to affect the state and was believed to be one of the worst droughts in 100 years. An estimated 6 million litres (6 million litres) of water were to be used at the three venues to maintain the pitches, with 4 million litres being used at the Wankhede Stadium, the site of eight matches. The High Court filed a public interest litigation and suggested shifting matches to "some other state where water is in abundance." The High Court questioned the BCCI about whether "people are more important or your IPL matches". The BCCI argued that the water being used at the venues was tanker water and not drinkable.

On 8 April, the Chief Minister of Maharashtra Devendra Fadnavis declared that potable water will not be supplied to the venues and added "even if IPL matches are shifted, we have no problem." On 9 April, hours before the season's opening match, the Mumbai Cricket Association claimed that the water being used at the Wankhede Stadium was bought from private operators and not Brihanmumbai Municipal Corporation.

On 13 April, the Bombay High Court ruled that all the matches to be held in the state in May must be moved to venues outside of Maharashtra. A total of 13 matches were scheduled to be hosted by the three venues in Maharashtra in the month of May, including two playoff matches in Pune and the final in Mumbai. The court later allowed a match scheduled for 1 May to take place in Pune due to logistical difficulties with moving the fixture.

The Mumbai Cricket Association and the Maharashtra Cricket Association petitioned the Supreme Court against the High Court's ruling, filing a plea which stated that treated sewage water will be used instead of potable water. After the Mumbai Indians selected Jaipur as their alternative venue, a petition was filed in the city which stated hosting IPL matches "will add unnecessary burden on the scarce natural resource." The Rajasthan High Court then questioned the state government and BCCI about shifting the matches to Rajasthan, a region also hit by drought, scheduling the hearing for 27 April. There were reports of protests being held in Jaipur against the shifting of matches to the city.

On 26 April the Supreme Court dismissed the petition against the Bombay High Court's ruling and confirmed that matches should be moved out of Maharashtra. The court had initially suggested that a series of regulations could be used to allow matches to go ahead under the condition that no drinkable water was used on the grounds, but opted to instead move the matches on the grounds that the suggested regulations would be complex and difficult to enforce.

On 29 April, it was announced that all league stage matches scheduled to be held after 1 May in Mumbai and Pune were shifted to the Dr. Y.S. Rajasekhara Reddy ACA-VDCA Cricket Stadium in Visakhapatnam. Two playoff matches scheduled to be held in Pune were shifted to Delhi and three Kings XI Punjab home matches supposed to be held in Nagpur were shifted to their primary home venue, Mohali. The M. Chinnaswamy Stadium in Bangalore, which was scheduled to host the Qualifier 1, was also announced as the host of the Final.

== Opening ceremony ==
The opening ceremony was held on 8 April 2016 from 19:30 IST at the Sardar Vallabhbhai Patel Stadium in Mumbai. It featured performances from Major Lazer, Yo Yo Honey Singh, Ranveer Singh, Katrina Kaif, Jacqueline Fernandez among others. Dwayne Bravo, a member of the West Indies' 2016 World Twenty20 winning team, performed the "Champion Dance", which, according to the IPL chairman Rajeev Shukla, was supposed to be the "special attraction" of the ceremony.

== Venues ==
Venues used during the season

Ten venues were selected to host the league stage matches. Bangalore hosted Qualifier 1, Pune was scheduled to host the Eliminator match and Qualifier 2 and Mumbai was scheduled to host the final. The drought situation in Maharashtra led to a ruling in the Bombay High Court that games to be played in the state, including in Pune and Mumbai, in May would have to be moved to other regions to allow water supplies to be prioritised. On 29 April 2016, the IPL Governing Council announced that all homes games of the Mumbai Indians and Rising Pune Supergiants after 2 May 2016, would be held at Visakhapatnam. The Eliminator and Qualifier 2 would to be held at Delhi, and the final at Bangalore. On 2 May 2016, it was announced that Gujarat Lions would play two of their matches on 19 and 21 May at Kanpur.

League stage and playoff venues
| Bangalore | Delhi |
|---|---|
| Royal Challengers Bangalore | Delhi Daredevils |
| M. Chinnaswamy Stadium | Feroz Shah Kotla |
| Capacity: 35,000 | Capacity: 41,000 |
| Matches: 9 (Qualifier 1 and Final) | Matches: 7 (Qualifier 2 and Eliminator) |

League stage venues
| Hyderabad | Kanpur | Kolkata |
|---|---|---|
| Sunrisers Hyderabad | Gujarat Lions | Kolkata Knight Riders |
| Rajiv Gandhi International Stadium | Green Park Stadium | Eden Gardens |
| Capacity: 55,000 | Capacity: 33,000 | Capacity: 68,000 |
| Matches: 7 | Matches: 2 | Matches: 7 |
| Mohali | Mumbai | Pune |
| Kings XI Punjab | Mumbai Indians | Rising Pune Supergiants |
| Punjab Cricket Association IS Bindra Stadium | Wankhede Stadium | Maharashtra Cricket Association Stadium |
| Capacity: 26,000 | Capacity: 33,000 | Capacity: 42,000 |
| Matches: 7 | Matches: 4 | Matches: 4 |
| Raipur | Rajkot | Visakhapatnam |
| Delhi Daredevils | Gujarat Lions | Mumbai Indians and Rising Pune Supergiants |
| Shaheed Veer Narayan Singh International Stadium | Saurashtra Cricket Association Stadium | Dr. Y.S. Rajasekhara Reddy ACA-VDCA Cricket Stadium |
| Capacity: 50,000 | Capacity: 28,000 | Capacity: 38,000 |
| Matches: 2 | Matches: 5 | Matches: 6 |

== Personnel changes ==
Each franchise was able to retain players from the previous season of the tournament, with their salaries automatically deducted from the franchise's available salary purse. The new teams were able to draft five players each from the two suspended franchises. Players were able to be traded during the trading windows and new players could be added to the teams at the 2016 IPL players auction held on 6 February 2016.

== Teams and standings ==
=== Points table ===
| Pos | Team | Pld | W | L | NR | Pts | NRR | |
|---|---|---|---|---|---|---|---|---|
| 1 | Gujarat Lions (3) | 14 | 9 | 5 | 0 | 18 | −0.374 | Advanced to Qualifier 1 |
| 2 | Royal Challengers Bangalore (RU) | 14 | 8 | 6 | 0 | 16 | 0.932 | Advanced to Qualifier 1 |
| 3 | Sunrisers Hyderabad (C) | 14 | 8 | 6 | 0 | 16 | 0.245 | Advanced to the Eliminator |
| 4 | Kolkata Knight Riders (4) | 14 | 8 | 6 | 0 | 16 | 0.106 | Advanced to the Eliminator |
| 5 | Mumbai Indians | 14 | 7 | 7 | 0 | 14 | −0.146 | |
| 6 | Delhi Daredevils | 14 | 7 | 7 | 0 | 14 | −0.155 | |
| 7 | Rising Pune Supergiants | 14 | 5 | 9 | 0 | 10 | 0.015 | |
| 8 | Kings XI Punjab | 14 | 4 | 10 | 0 | 8 | −0.646 | |

The four top ranked teams qualified for the playoffs

=== Match summary ===
| Visitor team → | DD | GL | KXIP | KKR | MI | RPS | RCB | SRH |
| Home team ↓ | DD | GL | KXIP | KKR | MI | RPS | RCB | SRH |
|---|---|---|---|---|---|---|---|---|
| Delhi Daredevils | | Gujarat; 1 run | Delhi; 8 wickets | Delhi; 27 runs | Delhi; 10 runs | Pune; 7 wickets | Bengaluru; 6 wickets | Delhi; 6 wickets |
| Gujarat Lions | Delhi; 8 wickets | | Punjab; 23 runs | Gujarat; 6 wickets | Gujarat; 6 wickets | Gujarat; 7 wickets | Gujarat; 6 wickets | Hyderabad; 10 wickets |
| Kings XI Punjab | Punjab; 9 runs | Gujarat; 5 wickets | | Kolkata; 6 wickets | Mumbai; 25 runs | Punjab; 6 wickets | Bengaluru; 1 run | Hyderabad; 7 wickets |
| Kolkata Knight Riders | Kolkata; 9 wickets | Gujarat; 5 wickets | Kolkata; 7 runs | | Mumbai; 6 wickets | Kolkata; 8 wickets (D/L) | Bengaluru; 9 wickets | Kolkata; 22 runs |
| Mumbai Indians | Mumbai; 80 runs | Gujarat; 3 wickets | Punjab; 7 wickets | Mumbai; 6 wickets | | Pune; 9 wickets | Mumbai; 6 wickets | Hyderabad; 85 runs |
| Rising Pune Supergiant | Pune; 19 runs (D/L) | Gujarat; 3 wickets | Pune; 4 wickets | Kolkata; 2 wickets | Mumbai; 8 wickets | | Bengaluru; 13 runs | Hyderabad; 4 runs |
| Royal Challengers Bengaluru | Delhi; 7 wickets | Bengaluru; 144 runs | Bengaluru; 82 runs (D/L) | Kolkata; 5 wickets | Mumbai; 6 wickets | Bengaluru; 7 wickets | | Bengaluru; 45 runs |
| Sunrisers Hyderabad | Delhi; 7 wickets | Hyderabad; 5 wickets | Hyderabad; 5 wickets | Kolkata; 8 wickets | Hyderabad; 7 wickets | Pune; 34 runs (D/L) | Hyderabad; 15 runs | |

| Home team won | Visitor team won |

- Note: Results listed are according to the home (horizontal) and visitor (vertical) teams.
- Note: Click on a result to see a summary of the match.

| Team | Group matches | | | | | | | | | | | | | | Playoffs | | | |
| Team | 1 | 2 | 3 | 4 | 5 | 6 | 7 | 8 | 9 | 10 | 11 | 12 | 13 | 14 | Q1 | E | Q2 | F |
|---|---|---|---|---|---|---|---|---|---|---|---|---|---|---|---|---|---|---|
| Delhi Daredevils | 0 | 2 | 4 | 6 | 6 | 8 | 10 | 10 | 10 | 12 | 12 | 12 | 14 | 14 | | | | |
| Gujarat Lions | 2 | 4 | 6 | 6 | 8 | 10 | 12 | 12 | 12 | 12 | 14 | 14 | 16 | 18 | L | | L | |
| Kings XI Punjab | 0 | 0 | 2 | 2 | 2 | 2 | 4 | 4 | 6 | 6 | 8 | 8 | 8 | 8 | | | | |
| Kolkata Knight Riders | 2 | 2 | 4 | 6 | 8 | 8 | 8 | 10 | 12 | 12 | 14 | 14 | 14 | 16 | | L | | |
| Mumbai Indians | 0 | 2 | 2 | 2 | 4 | 4 | 6 | 8 | 10 | 10 | 12 | 12 | 14 | 14 | | | | |
| Rising Pune Supergiant | 2 | 2 | 2 | 2 | 2 | 4 | 4 | 4 | 6 | 6 | 6 | 6 | 8 | 10 | | | | |
| Royal Challengers Bengaluru | 2 | 2 | 2 | 4 | 4 | 4 | 4 | 6 | 8 | 8 | 10 | 12 | 14 | 16 | W | | | L |
| Sunrisers Hyderabad | 0 | 0 | 2 | 4 | 6 | 6 | 8 | 10 | 12 | 14 | 14 | 16 | 16 | 16 | | W | W | W |

| Win | Loss | No result |

- Note: The total points at the end of each group match are listed.
- Note: Click on the points (group matches) or W/L (playoffs) to see the match summary.

== League stage ==
=== Match results ===
9 April
20:00 (D/N)
Scorecard

| (H) Mumbai Indians; 121/8 (20 overs) | v | Rising Pune Supergiants; 126/1 (14.4 overs) |
| Harbhajan Singh 45* (30); Mitchell Marsh 2/21 (4 overs) | | Ajinkya Rahane 66* (42); Harbhajan Singh 1/24 (3 overs) |

Rising Pune Supergiants won by 9 wickets
Wankhede Stadium, Mumbai
Umpires: Kumar Dharmasena (Sri Lanka) and C. K. Nandan (India)
Player of the match: Ajinkya Rahane (Rising Pune Supergiants)

- Mumbai Indians won the toss and elected to bat.

10 April
20:00 (D/N)
Scorecard

| Delhi Daredevils; 98 (17.4 overs) | v | Kolkata Knight Riders (H); 99/1 (14.1 overs) |
| Quinton de Kock 17 (10); Brad Hogg 3/19 (4 overs) | | Gautam Gambhir 38* (41); Amit Mishra 1/11 (2 overs) |

Kolkata Knight Riders won by 9 wickets
Eden Gardens, Kolkata
Umpires: Sundaram Ravi (India) and Chettithody Shamshuddin (India)
Player of the match: Andre Russell (Kolkata Knight Riders)

- Kolkata Knight Riders won the toss and elected to field.

11 April
20:00 (D/N)
Scorecard

| (H) Kings XI Punjab; 161/6 (20 overs) | v | Gujarat Lions; 162/5 (17.4 overs) |
| Murali Vijay 42 (34); Dwayne Bravo 4/22 (4 overs) | | Aaron Finch 74 (47); Sandeep Sharma 1/21 (3 overs) |

Gujarat Lions won by 5 wickets
Punjab Cricket Association IS Bindra Stadium, Mohali
Umpires: Anil Chaudhary (India) and Vineet Kulkarni (India)
Player of the match: Aaron Finch (Gujarat Lions)

- Gujarat Lions won the toss and elected to field.

12 April
20:00 (D/N)
Scorecard

| (H) Royal Challengers Bangalore; 227/4 (20 overs) | v | Sunrisers Hyderabad; 182/6 (20 overs) |
| AB de Villiers 82 (42); Mustafizur Rahman 2/26 (4 overs) | | David Warner 58 (25); Shane Watson 2/30 (4 overs) |

Royal Challengers Bangalore won by 45 runs
M. Chinnaswamy Stadium, Bangalore
Umpires: Kumar Dharmasena (Sri Lanka) and Virender Sharma (India)
Player of the match: AB de Villiers (Royal Challengers Bangalore)

- Sunrisers Hyderabad won the toss and elected to field.

13 April
20:00 (D/N)
Scorecard

| (H) Kolkata Knight Riders; 187/5 (20 overs) | v | Mumbai Indians; 188/4 (19.1 overs) |
| Gautam Gambhir 64 (52); Mitchell McClenaghan 2/25 (4 overs) | | Rohit Sharma 84* (54); Piyush Chawla 1/29 (3.1 overs) |

Mumbai Indians won by 6 wickets
Eden Gardens, Kolkata
Umpires: Nitin Menon (India) and Sundaram Ravi (India)
Player of the match: Rohit Sharma (Mumbai Indians)

- Mumbai Indians won the toss and elected to field.

14 April
20:00 (D/N)
Scorecard

| Rising Pune Supergiants; 163/5 (20 overs) | v | Gujarat Lions (H); 164/3 (18 overs) |
| Faf du Plessis 69 (43); Ravindra Jadeja 2/18 (4 overs) | | Aaron Finch 50 (36); Murugan Ashwin 2/31 (4 overs) |

Gujarat Lions won by 7 wickets
Saurashtra Cricket Association Stadium, Rajkot
Umpires: Vineet Kulkarni (India) and C. K. Nandan (India)
Player of the match: Aaron Finch (Gujarat Lions)

- Rising Pune Supergiants won the toss and elected to bat.

15 April
20:00 (D/N)
Scorecard

| Kings XI Punjab; 111/9 (20 overs) | v | Delhi Daredevils (H); 113/2 (13.3 overs) |
| Manan Vohra 32 (24); Amit Mishra 4/11 (3 overs) | | Quinton de Kock 59* (42); Sandeep Sharma 1/6 (2 overs) |

Delhi Daredevils won by 8 wickets
Feroz Shah Kotla, Delhi
Umpires: Sundaram Ravi (India) and Chettithody Shamshuddin (India)
Player of the match: Amit Mishra (Delhi Daredevils)

- Delhi Daredevils won the toss and elected to field.

16 April
16:00 (D/N)
Scorecard

| (H) Sunrisers Hyderabad; 142/7 (20 overs) | v | Kolkata Knight Riders; 146/2 (18.2 overs) |
| Eoin Morgan 51 (43); Umesh Yadav 3/28 (4 overs) | | Gautam Gambhir 90* (60); Ashish Reddy 1/14 (2 overs) |

Kolkata Knight Riders won by 8 wickets
Rajiv Gandhi International Cricket Stadium, Hyderabad
Umpires: Anil Chaudhary (India) and C. K. Nandan (India)
Player of the match: Gautam Gambhir (Kolkata Knight Riders)

- Sunrisers Hyderabad won the toss and elected to bat.

16 April
20:00 (D/N)
Scorecard

| (H) Mumbai Indians; 143/8 (20 overs) | v | Gujarat Lions; 147/7 (20 overs) |
| Parthiv Patel 34 (29); Pravin Tambe 2/12 (2 overs) | | Aaron Finch 67* (54); Mitchell McClenaghan 4/21 (4 overs) |

Gujarat Lions won by 3 wickets
Wankhede Stadium, Mumbai
Umpires: Kumar Dharmasena (Sri Lanka) and Virender Sharma (India)
Player of the match: Aaron Finch (Gujarat Lions)

- Gujarat Lions won the toss and elected to field.

17 April
16:00 (D/N)
Scorecard

| Rising Pune Supergiants; 152/7 (20 overs) | v | Kings XI Punjab (H); 153/4 (18.4 overs) |
| Faf du Plessis 67 (53); Mohit Sharma 3/23 (4 overs) | | Murali Vijay 53 (49); Murugan Ashwin 3/36 (4 overs) |

Kings XI Punjab won by 6 wickets
Punjab Cricket Association IS Bindra Stadium, Mohali
Umpires: Sundaram Ravi (India) and Chettithody Shamshuddin (India)
Player of the match: Manan Vohra (Kings XI Punjab)

- Rising Pune Supergiants won the toss and elected to bat.

17 April
20:00 (D/N)
Scorecard

| (H) Royal Challengers Bangalore; 191/5 (20 overs) | v | Delhi Daredevils; 192/3 (19.1 overs) |
| Virat Kohli 79 (48); Mohammed Shami 2/34 (4 overs) | | Quinton de Kock 108 (51); Shane Watson 2/25 (4 overs) |

Delhi Daredevils won by 7 wickets
M. Chinnaswamy Stadium, Bangalore
Umpires: Vineet Kulkarni (India) and A. Nand Kishore (India)
Player of the match: Quinton de Kock (Delhi Daredevils)

- Delhi Daredevils won the toss and elected to field.

18 April
20:00 (D/N)
Scorecard

| Mumbai Indians; 142/6 (20 overs) | v | Sunrisers Hyderabad (H); 145/3 (17.3 overs) |
| Ambati Rayudu 54 (49); Barinder Sran 3/28 (4 overs) | | David Warner 90* (59); Tim Southee 3/24 (4 overs) |

Sunrisers Hyderabad won by 7 wickets
Rajiv Gandhi International Cricket Stadium, Hyderabad
Umpires: Kumar Dharmasena (Sri Lanka) and Virender Sharma (India)
Player of the match: David Warner (Sunrisers Hyderabad)

- Sunrisers Hyderabad won the toss and elected to field.

19 April
20:00 (D/N)
Scorecard

| (H) Kings XI Punjab; 138/8 (20 overs) | v | Kolkata Knight Riders; 141/4 (17.1 overs) |
| Shaun Marsh 56* (41); Sunil Narine 2/22 (4 overs) | | Robin Uthappa 53 (28); Pardeep Sahu 2/18 (4 overs) |

Kolkata Knight Riders won by 6 wickets
Punjab Cricket Association IS Bindra Stadium, Mohali
Umpires: Sundaram Ravi (India) and Chettithody Shamshuddin (India)
Player of the match: Robin Uthappa (Kolkata Knight Riders)

- Kolkata Knight Riders won the toss and elected to field.

20 April
20:00 (D/N)
Scorecard

| Royal Challengers Bangalore; 170/7 (20 overs) | v | Mumbai Indians (H); 171/4 (18 overs) |
| Travis Head 37 (24); Jasprit Bumrah 3/31 (4 overs) | | Rohit Sharma 62 (44); Iqbal Abdulla 3/40 (4 overs) |

Mumbai Indians won by 6 wickets
Wankhede Stadium, Mumbai
Umpires: Anil Chaudhary (India) and C. K. Nandan (India)
Player of the match: Rohit Sharma (Mumbai Indians)

- Mumbai Indians won the toss and elected to field.

21 April
20:00 (D/N)
Scorecard

| (H) Gujarat Lions; 135/8 (20 overs) | v | Sunrisers Hyderabad; 137/0 (14.5 overs) |
| Suresh Raina 75 (51); Bhuvneshwar Kumar 4/29 (4 overs) | | David Warner 74* (48); Ravindra Jadeja 0/20 (2.5 overs) |

Sunrisers Hyderabad won by 10 wickets
Saurashtra Cricket Association Stadium, Rajkot
Umpires: Krishnamachari Bharatan (India) and Kumar Dharmasena (Sri Lanka)
Player of the match: Bhuvneshwar Kumar (Sunrisers Hyderabad)

- Sunrisers Hyderabad won the toss and elected to field.

22 April
20:00 (D/N)
Scorecard

| Royal Challengers Bangalore; 185/3 (20 overs) | v | Rising Pune Supergiants (H); 172/8 (20 overs) |
| AB de Villiers 83 (46); Thisara Perera 3/34 (4 overs) | | Ajinkya Rahane 60 (46); Kane Richardson 3/13 (3 overs) |

Royal Challengers Bangalore won by 13 runs
Maharashtra Cricket Association Stadium, Pune
Umpires: Chris Gaffaney (New Zealand) and Virender Sharma (India)
Player of the match: AB de Villiers (Royal Challengers Bangalore)

- Rising Pune Supergiants won the toss and elected to field.

23 April
16:00 (D/N)
Scorecard

| (H) Delhi Daredevils; 164/4 (20 overs) | v | Mumbai Indians; 154/7 (20 overs) |
| Sanju Samson 60 (48); Mitchell McClenaghan 2/31 (4 overs) | | Rohit Sharma 65 (48); Amit Mishra 2/24 (4 overs) |

Delhi Daredevils won by 10 runs
Feroz Shah Kotla, Delhi
Umpires: Sundaram Ravi (India) and Chettithody Shamshuddin (India)
Player of the match: Sanju Samson (Delhi Daredevils)

- Mumbai Indians won the toss and elected to field.

23 April
20:00 (D/N)
Scorecard

| Kings XI Punjab; 143/6 (20 overs) | v | Sunrisers Hyderabad (H); 146/5 (17.5 overs) |
| Shaun Marsh 40 (34); Mustafizur Rahman 2/9 (4 overs) | | David Warner 59 (31); Mohit Sharma 1/20 (3 overs) |

Sunrisers Hyderabad won by 5 wickets
Rajiv Gandhi International Cricket Stadium, Hyderabad
Umpires: Anil Chaudhary (India) and C. K. Nandan (India)
Player of the match: Mustafizur Rahman (Sunrisers Hyderabad)

- Sunrisers Hyderabad won the toss and elected to field.

24 April
16:00 (D/N)
Scorecard

| Royal Challengers Bangalore; 180/2 (20 overs) | v | Gujarat Lions (H); 182/4 (19.3 overs) |
| Virat Kohli 100* (63); Pravin Tambe 1/24 (3 overs) | | Dinesh Karthik 50* (39); Tabraiz Shamsi 1/21 (4 overs) |

Gujarat Lions won by 6 wickets
Saurashtra Cricket Association Stadium, Rajkot
Umpires: Krishnamachari Bharatan (India) and Bruce Oxenford (Australia)
Player of the match: Virat Kohli (Royal Challengers Bangalore)

- Royal Challengers Bangalore won the toss and elected to bat.

24 April
20:00 (D/N)
Scorecard

| (H) Rising Pune Supergiants; 160/5 (20 overs) | v | Kolkata Knight Riders; 162/8 (19.3 overs) |
| Ajinkya Rahane 67 (52); Shakib Al Hasan 1/14 (3 overs) | | Suryakumar Yadav 60 (49); Rajat Bhatia 2/19 (4 overs) |

Kolkata Knight Riders won by 2 wickets
Maharashtra Cricket Association Stadium, Pune
Umpires: Chris Gaffaney (New Zealand) and A. Nand Kishore (India)
Player of the match: Suryakumar Yadav (Kolkata Knight Riders)

- Kolkata Knight Riders won the toss and elected to field.

25 April
20:00 (D/N)
Scorecard

| Mumbai Indians; 189/6 (20 overs) | v | Kings XI Punjab (H); 164/7 (20 overs) |
| Parthiv Patel 81 (58); Mohit Sharma 3/38 (4 overs) | | Glenn Maxwell 56 (39); Jasprit Bumrah 3/26 (4 overs) |

Mumbai Indians won by 25 runs
Punjab Cricket Association IS Bindra Stadium, Mohali
Umpires: Nitin Menon (India) and Rod Tucker (Australia)
Player of the match: Parthiv Patel (Mumbai Indians)

- Kings XI Punjab won the toss and elected to field.

26 April
20:00 (D/N)
Scorecard

| (H) Sunrisers Hyderabad; 118/8 (20 overs) | v | Rising Pune Supergiants; 94/3 (11 overs) |
| Shikhar Dhawan 56* (53); Ashok Dinda 3/23 (4 overs) | | Steve Smith 46* (36); Moises Henriques 1/16 (2 overs) |

Rising Pune Supergiants won by 34 runs (D/L method)
Rajiv Gandhi International Cricket Stadium, Hyderabad
Umpires: Anil Dandekar (India) and C. K. Nandan (India)
Player of the match: Ashok Dinda (Rising Pune Supergiants)

- Rising Pune Supergiants won the toss and elected to field.
- Rain delayed the start of play by an hour.
- Rain stopped play during the Rising Pune Supergiants innings and reduced Pune's target to 61 off 11 overs.

27 April
20:00 (D/N)
Scorecard

| Gujarat Lions; 172/6 (20 overs) | v | Delhi Daredevils (H); 171/5 (20 overs) |
| Brendon McCullum 60 (36); Imran Tahir 3/24 (4 overs) | | Chris Morris 82* (32); Dhawal Kulkarni 3/19 (4 overs) |

Gujarat Lions won by 1 run
Feroz Shah Kotla, Delhi
Umpires: Marais Erasmus (South Africa) and Sundaram Ravi (India)
Player of the match: Chris Morris (Delhi Daredevils)

- Delhi Daredevils won the toss and elected to field.
- Rishabh Pant (Delhi Daredevils) made his Twenty20 debut.

28 April
20:00 (D/N)
Scorecard

| Kolkata Knight Riders; 174/5 (20 overs) | v | Mumbai Indians (H); 178/4 (18 overs) |
| Gautam Gambhir 59 (45); Tim Southee 2/38 (4 overs) | | Rohit Sharma 68* (49); Sunil Narine 2/22 (4 overs) |

Mumbai Indians won by 6 wickets
Wankhede Stadium, Mumbai
Umpires: Nitin Menon (India) and Rod Tucker (Australia)
Player of the match: Rohit Sharma (Mumbai Indians)

- Mumbai Indians won the toss and elected to field.

29 April
20:00 (D/N)
Scorecard

| (H) Rising Pune Supergiants; 195/3 (20 overs) | v | Gujarat Lions; 196/7 (20 overs) |
| Steve Smith 101 (54); Dwayne Bravo 1/40 (4 overs) | | Dwayne Smith 63 (37); Ashok Dinda 2/40 (4 overs) |

Gujarat Lions won by 3 wickets
Maharashtra Cricket Association Stadium, Pune
Umpires: Chris Gaffaney (New Zealand) and Bruce Oxenford (Australia)
Player of the match: Dwayne Smith (Gujarat Lions)

- Gujarat Lions won the toss and elected to field.
- Shivil Kaushik (Gujarat Lions) made his Twenty20 debut.

30 April
16:00 (D/N)
Scorecard

| (H) Delhi Daredevils; 186/8 (20 overs) | v | Kolkata Knight Riders; 159 (18.3 overs) |
| Karun Nair 68 (50); Andre Russell 3/26 (4 overs) | | Robin Uthappa 72 (52); Zaheer Khan 3/21 (3.3 overs) |

Delhi Daredevils won by 27 runs
Feroz Shah Kotla, Delhi
Umpires: K. N. Ananthapadmanabhan (India) and Marais Erasmus (South Africa)
Player of the match: Carlos Brathwaite (Delhi Daredevils)

- Kolkata Knight Riders won the toss and elected to field.

30 April
20:00 (D/N)
Scorecard

| (H) Sunrisers Hyderabad; 194/5 (20 overs) | v | Royal Challengers Bangalore; 179/6 (20 overs) |
| David Warner 92 (50); Kane Richardson 2/45 (4 overs) | | KL Rahul 51 (28); Ashish Nehra 1/32 (4 overs) |

Sunrisers Hyderabad won by 15 runs
Rajiv Gandhi International Cricket Stadium, Hyderabad
Umpires: Anil Chaudhary (India) and Kumar Dharmasena (Sri Lanka)
Player of the match: David Warner (Sunrisers Hyderabad)

- Royal Challengers Bangalore won the toss and elected to field.
- Rain delayed the start of play by an hour.

1 May
16:00 (D/N)
Scorecard

| Kings XI Punjab; 154 (19.5 overs) | v | Gujarat Lions (H); 131/9 (20 overs) |
| Murali Vijay 55 (41); Shivil Kaushik 3/20 (4 overs) | | James Faulkner 32 (27); Axar Patel 4/21 (4 overs) |

Kings XI Punjab won by 23 runs
Saurashtra Cricket Association Stadium, Rajkot
Umpires: Bruce Oxenford (Australia) and Virender Sharma (India)
Player of the match: Axar Patel (Kings XI Punjab)

- Gujarat Lions won the toss and elected to field.

1 May
20:00 (D/N)
Scorecard

| (H) Rising Pune Supergiants; 159/5 (20 overs) | v | Mumbai Indians; 161/2 (18.3 overs) |
| Saurabh Tiwary 57 (45); Jasprit Bumrah 3/29 (4 overs) | | Rohit Sharma 85* (60); Ravichandran Ashwin 1/21 (3 overs) |

Mumbai Indians won by 8 wickets
Maharashtra Cricket Association Stadium, Pune
Umpires: Anil Dandekar (India) and Rod Tucker (Australia)
Player of the match: Rohit Sharma (Mumbai Indians)

- Mumbai Indians won the toss and elected to field.

2 May
20:00 (D/N)
Scorecard

| (H) Royal Challengers Bangalore; 185/7 (20 overs) | v | Kolkata Knight Riders; 189/5 (19.1 overs) |
| KL Rahul 52 (32); Morne Morkel 2/28 (4 overs) | | Yusuf Pathan 60* (29); Yuzvendra Chahal 2/27 (4 overs) |

Kolkata Knight Riders won by 5 wickets
M. Chinnaswamy Stadium, Bangalore
Umpires: Marais Erasmus (South Africa) and Sundaram Ravi (India)
Player of the match: Andre Russell (Kolkata Knight Riders)

- Kolkata Knight Riders won the toss and elected to field.

3 May
20:00 (D/N)
Scorecard

| (H) Gujarat Lions; 149/7 (20 overs) | v | Delhi Daredevils; 150/2 (17.2 overs) |
| Dinesh Karthik 53 (43); Shahbaz Nadeem 2/23 (3 overs) | | Rishabh Pant 69 (40); Ravindra Jadeja 1/21 (2.2 overs) |

Delhi Daredevils won by 8 wickets
Saurashtra Cricket Association Stadium, Rajkot
Umpires: Chris Gaffaney (New Zealand) and Bruce Oxenford (Australia)
Player of the match: Rishabh Pant (Delhi Daredevils)

- Delhi Daredevils won the toss and elected to field.

4 May
20:00 (D/N)
Scorecard

| (H) Kolkata Knight Riders; 164/3 (20 overs) | v | Kings XI Punjab; 157/9 (20 overs) |
| Robin Uthappa 70 (49); Axar Patel 0/24 (4 overs) | | Glenn Maxwell 68 (42); Andre Russell 4/20 (4 overs) |

Kolkata Knight Riders won by 7 runs
Eden Gardens, Kolkata
Umpires: Anil Chaudhary (India) and Kumar Dharmasena (Sri Lanka)
Player of the match: Andre Russell (Kolkata Knight Riders)

- Kings XI Punjab won the toss and elected to field.

5 May
20:00 (D/N)
Scorecard

| (H) Delhi Daredevils; 162/7 (20 overs) | v | Rising Pune Supergiants; 166/3 (19.1 overs) |
| JP Duminy 34 (32); Rajat Bhatia 2/22 (4 overs) | | Ajinkya Rahane 63* (48); Imran Tahir 2/26 (4 overs) |

Rising Pune Supergiants won by 7 wickets
Feroz Shah Kotla, Delhi
Umpires: Chettithody Shamshuddin (India) and Rod Tucker (Australia)
Player of the match: Ajinkya Rahane (Rising Pune Supergiants)

- Rising Pune Supergiants won the toss and elected to field.

6 May
20:00 (D/N)
Scorecard

| Gujarat Lions; 126/6 (20 overs) | v | Sunrisers Hyderabad (H); 129/5 (19 overs) |
| Aaron Finch 51* (42); Mustafizur Rahman 2/17 (4 overs) | | Shikhar Dhawan 47* (40); Dwayne Bravo 2/14 (3 overs) |

Sunrisers Hyderabad won by 5 wickets
Rajiv Gandhi International Cricket Stadium, Hyderabad
Umpires: Marais Erasmus (South Africa) and Sundaram Ravi (India)
Player of the match: Bhuvneshwar Kumar (Sunrisers Hyderabad)

- Sunrisers Hyderabad won the toss and elected to field.

7 May
16:00 (D/N)
Scorecard

| Rising Pune Supergiants; 191/6 (20 overs) | v | Royal Challengers Bangalore (H); 195/3 (19.3 overs) |
| Ajinkya Rahane 74 (48); Shane Watson 3/24 (4 overs) | | Virat Kohli 108* (58); Adam Zampa 2/35 (4 overs) |

Royal Challengers Bangalore won by 7 wickets
M. Chinnaswamy Stadium, Bangalore
Umpires: Chris Gaffaney (New Zealand) and Bruce Oxenford (Australia)
Player of the match: Virat Kohli (Royal Challengers Bangalore)

- Royal Challengers Bangalore won the toss and elected to field.

7 May
20:00 (D/N)
Scorecard

| (H) Kings XI Punjab; 181/5 (20 overs) | v | Delhi Daredevils; 172/5 (20 overs) |
| Wriddhiman Saha 52 (33); Chris Morris 2/30 (4 overs) | | Quinton de Kock 52 (30); Marcus Stoinis 3/40 (4 overs) |

Kings XI Punjab won by 9 runs
Punjab Cricket Association IS Bindra Stadium, Mohali
Umpires: Kumar Dharmasena (Sri Lanka) and C. K. Nandan (India)
Player of the match: Marcus Stoinis (Kings XI Punjab)

- Delhi Daredevils won the toss and elected to field.

8 May
16:00 (D/N)
Scorecard

| Sunrisers Hyderabad; 177/3 (20 overs) | v | Mumbai Indians (H); 92 (16.3 overs) |
| Shikhar Dhawan 82* (57); Harbhajan Singh 2/29 (4 overs) | | Harbhajan Singh 21* (22); Ashish Nehra 3/15 (3 overs) |

Sunrisers Hyderabad won by 85 runs
Dr. Y.S. Rajasekhara Reddy ACA-VDCA Cricket Stadium, Visakhapatnam
Umpires: Sundaram Ravi (India) and Chettithody Shamshuddin (India)
Player of the match: Ashish Nehra (Sunrisers Hyderabad)

- Mumbai Indians won the toss and elected to field.

8 May
20:00 (D/N)
Scorecard

| (H) Kolkata Knight Riders; 158/4 (20 overs) | v | Gujarat Lions; 164/5 (18 overs) |
| Shakib Al Hasan 66* (49); Praveen Kumar 2/19 (4 overs) | | Dinesh Karthik 51 (29); Brad Hogg 1/19 (2 overs) |

Gujarat Lions won by 5 wickets
Eden Gardens, Kolkata
Umpires: Marais Erasmus (South Africa) and Rod Tucker (Australia)
Player of the match: Praveen Kumar (Gujarat Lions)

- Gujarat Lions won the toss and elected to field.

9 May
20:00 (D/N)
Scorecard

| Royal Challengers Bangalore; 175/6 (20 overs) | v | Kings XI Punjab (H); 174/4 (20 overs) |
| AB de Villiers 64 (35); KC Cariappa 2/16 (3 overs) | | Murali Vijay 89 (57); Shane Watson 2/22 (4 overs) |

Royal Challengers Bangalore won by 1 run
Punjab Cricket Association IS Bindra Stadium, Mohali
Umpires: Anil Chaudhary (India) and Kumar Dharmasena (Sri Lanka)
Player of the match: Shane Watson (Royal Challengers Bangalore)

- Kings XI Punjab won the toss and elected to field.

10 May
20:00 (D/N)
Scorecard

| Sunrisers Hyderabad; 137/8 (20 overs) | v | Rising Pune Supergiants (H); 133/8 (20 overs) |
| Shikhar Dhawan 33 (27); Adam Zampa 6/19 (4 overs) | | George Bailey 34 (40); Ashish Nehra 3/29 (4 overs) |

Sunrisers Hyderabad won by 4 runs
Dr. Y.S. Rajasekhara Reddy ACA-VDCA Cricket Stadium, Visakhapatnam
Umpires: Chris Gaffaney (New Zealand) and Virender Sharma (India)
Player of the match: Adam Zampa (Rising Pune Supergiants)

- Sunrisers Hyderabad won the toss and elected to bat.

11 May
20:00 (D/N)
Scorecard

| (H) Royal Challengers Bangalore; 151/4 (20 overs) | v | Mumbai Indians; 153/4 (18.4 overs) |
| KL Rahul 68* (53); Krunal Pandya 1/15 (4 overs) | | Ambati Rayudu 44 (47); Varun Aaron 2/37 (3.4 overs) |

Mumbai Indians won by 6 wickets
M. Chinnaswamy Stadium, Bangalore
Umpires: Anil Dandekar (India) and Chettithody Shamshuddin (India)
Player of the match: Krunal Pandya (Mumbai Indians)

- Mumbai Indians won the toss and elected to field.

12 May
20:00 (D/N)
Scorecard

| (H) Sunrisers Hyderabad; 146/8 (20 overs) | v | Delhi Daredevils; 150/3 (18.1 overs) |
| David Warner 46 (30); Amit Mishra 2/19 (3 overs) | | Quinton de Kock 44 (31); Moises Henriques 2/19 (3 overs) |

Delhi Daredevils won by 7 wickets
Rajiv Gandhi International Cricket Stadium, Hyderabad
Umpires: Krishnamachari Bharatan (India) and Marais Erasmus (South Africa)
Player of the match: Chris Morris (Delhi Daredevils)

- Delhi Daredevils won the toss and elected to field.

13 May
20:00 (D/N)
Scorecard

| (H) Mumbai Indians; 124/9 (20 overs) | v | Kings XI Punjab; 127/3 (17 overs) |
| Kieron Pollard 27 (20); Marcus Stoinis 4/15 (4 overs) | | Wriddhiman Saha 56 (40); Mitchell McClenaghan 2/24 (3 overs) |

Kings XI Punjab won by 7 wickets
Dr. Y.S. Rajasekhara Reddy ACA-VDCA Cricket Stadium, Visakhapatnam
Umpires: Kumar Dharmasena (Sri Lanka) and C. K. Nandan (India)
Player of the match: Marcus Stoinis (Kings XI Punjab)

- Mumbai Indians won the toss and elected to bat.

14 May
16:00 (D/N)
Scorecard

| (H) Royal Challengers Bangalore; 248/3 (20 overs) | v | Gujarat Lions; 104 (18.4 overs) |
| AB de Villiers 129* (52); Praveen Kumar 2/45 (4 overs) | | Aaron Finch 37 (38); Chris Jordan 4/11 (3 overs) |

Royal Challengers Bangalore won by 144 runs
M. Chinnaswamy Stadium, Bangalore
Umpires: Anil Dandekar (India) and Virender Sharma (India)
Player of the match: AB de Villiers (Royal Challengers Bangalore)

- Gujarat Lions won the toss and elected to field.
- The 229-run partnership between Virat Kohli and AB de Villiers is the highest partnership for any wicket in T20 cricket history.
- It was the first instance of two batsmen scoring hundreds in the same match in the IPL, and the second overall instance in a T20 match.

14 May
20:00 (D/N)
Scorecard

| Rising Pune Supergiants; 103/6 (17.4 overs) | v | Kolkata Knight Riders (H); 66/2 (5 overs) |
| George Bailey 33 (27); Piyush Chawla 2/21 (4 overs) | | Yusuf Pathan 37* (18); Ravichandran Ashwin 2/30 (2 overs) |

Kolkata Knight Riders won by 8 wickets (D/L method)
Eden Gardens, Kolkata
Umpires: A. Nand Kishore (India) and Bruce Oxenford (Australia)
Player of the match: Yusuf Pathan (Kolkata Knight Riders)

- Rising Pune Supergiants won the toss and elected to bat.
- Rain stopped the Rising Pune Supergiants innings with 18 overs completed and reduced Kolkata Knight Riders' target to 66 off 9 overs.
- Rising Pune Supergiants were eliminated as a result of this match.

15 May
16:00 (D/N)
Scorecard

| (H) Kings XI Punjab; 179/4 (20 overs) | v | Sunrisers Hyderabad; 180/3 (19.4 overs) |
| Hashim Amla 96 (56); Bhuvneshwar Kumar 2/32 (4 overs) | | David Warner 52 (41); Axar Patel 1/26 (4 overs) |

Sunrisers Hyderabad won by 7 wickets
Punjab Cricket Association IS Bindra Stadium, Mohali
Umpires: K. N. Ananthapadmanabhan (India) and Marais Erasmus (South Africa)
Player of the match: Hashim Amla (Kings XI Punjab)

- Kings XI Punjab won the toss and elected to bat.
- Kings XI Punjab were eliminated as a result of this match.

15 May
20:00 (D/N)
Scorecard

| (H) Mumbai Indians; 206/4 (20 overs) | v | Delhi Daredevils; 126 (19.1 overs) |
| Krunal Pandya 86 (37); Chris Morris 2/34 (4 overs) | | Quinton de Kock 40 (28); Jasprit Bumrah 3/13 (4 overs) |

Mumbai Indians won by 80 runs
Dr. Y.S. Rajasekhara Reddy ACA-VDCA Cricket Stadium, Visakhapatnam
Umpires: Nitin Menon (India) and C. K. Nandan (India)
Player of the match: Krunal Pandya (Mumbai Indians)

- Delhi Daredevils won the toss and elected to field.

16 May
20:00 (D/N)
Scorecard

| (H) Kolkata Knight Riders; 183/5 (20 overs) | v | Royal Challengers Bangalore; 186/1 (18.4 overs) |
| Gautam Gambhir 51 (34); Sreenath Aravind 2/41 (4 overs) | | Virat Kohli 75* (51); Sunil Narine 1/34 (4 overs) |

Royal Challengers Bangalore won by 9 wickets
Eden Gardens, Kolkata
Umpires: Chris Gaffaney (New Zealand) and A. Nand Kishore (India)
Player of the match: Virat Kohli (Royal Challengers Bangalore)

- Royal Challengers Bangalore won the toss and elected to field.

17 May
20:00 (D/N)
Scorecard

| Delhi Daredevils; 121/6 (20 overs) | v | Rising Pune Supergiants (H); 76/1 (11 overs) |
| Karun Nair 41 (43); Ashok Dinda 3/20 (4 overs) | | Ajinkya Rahane 42* (36); Chris Morris 1/12 (2 overs) |

Rising Pune Supergiants won by 19 runs (D/L method)
Dr. Y.S. Rajasekhara Reddy ACA-VDCA Cricket Stadium, Visakhapatnam
Umpires: Nitin Menon (India) and Chettithody Shamshuddin (India)
Player of the match: Ashok Dinda (Rising Pune Supergiants)

- Rising Pune Supergiants won the toss and elected to field.
- Rain stopped play twice during the Rising Pune Supergiants innings and reduced Pune's target to 58 off 11 overs.

18 May
20:00 (D/N)
Scorecard

| (H) Royal Challengers Bangalore; 211/3 (15 overs) | v | Kings XI Punjab; 120/9 (14 overs) |
| Virat Kohli 113 (50); Sandeep Sharma 1/29 (3 overs) | | Wriddhiman Saha 24 (10); Yuzvendra Chahal 4/25 (3 overs) |

Royal Challengers Bangalore won by 82 runs (D/L method)
M. Chinnaswamy Stadium, Bangalore
Umpires: K. N. Ananthapadmanabhan (India) and Marais Erasmus (South Africa)
Player of the match: Virat Kohli (Royal Challengers Bangalore)

- Kings XI Punjab won the toss and elected to field.
- Rain delayed the start of play by two hours and reduced the match to 15 overs per side.
- Rain stopped play during the Kings XI Punjab innings and reduced Punjab's target to 203 off 14 overs.

19 May
20:00 (D/N)
Scorecard

| Kolkata Knight Riders; 124/8 (20 overs) | v | Gujarat Lions (H); 125/4 (13.3 overs) |
| Yusuf Pathan 36 (36); Dwayne Smith 4/8 (4 overs) | | Suresh Raina 53* (36); Sunil Narine 1/30 (4 overs) |

Gujarat Lions won by 6 wickets
Green Park Stadium, Kanpur
Umpires: Anil Chaudhary (India) and C. K. Nandan (India)
Player of the match: Dwayne Smith (Gujarat Lions)

- Gujarat Lions won the toss and elected to field.

20 May
20:00 (D/N)
Scorecard

| Sunrisers Hyderabad; 158/7 (20 overs) | v | Delhi Daredevils (H); 161/4 (20 overs) |
| David Warner 73 (56); Carlos Brathwaite 2/27 (4 overs) | | Karun Nair 83* (59); Barinder Sran 2/34 (4 overs) |

Delhi Daredevils won by 6 wickets
Shaheed Veer Narayan Singh International Stadium, Raipur
Umpires: A. Nand Kishore (India) and Bruce Oxenford (Australia)
Player of the match: Karun Nair (Delhi Daredevils)

- Delhi Daredevils won the toss and elected to field.

21 May
16:00 (D/N)
Scorecard

| Kings XI Punjab; 172/7 (20 overs) | v | Rising Pune Supergiants (H); 173/6 (20 overs) |
| Murali Vijay 59 (41); Ravichandran Ashwin 4/34 (4 overs) | | MS Dhoni 64* (32); Gurkeerat Singh 2/15 (2 overs) |

Rising Pune Supergiants won by 4 wickets
Dr. Y.S. Rajasekhara Reddy ACA-VDCA Cricket Stadium, Visakhapatnam
Umpires: Kumar Dharmasena (Sri Lanka) and Nitin Menon (India)
Player of the match: MS Dhoni (Rising Pune Supergiants)

- Kings XI Punjab won the toss and elected to bat.

21 May
20:00 (D/N)
Scorecard

| Mumbai Indians; 172/8 (20 overs) | v | Gujarat Lions (H); 173/4 (17.5 overs) |
| Nitish Rana 70 (36); Dwayne Bravo 2/22 (4 overs) | | Suresh Raina 58 (36); Vinay Kumar 2/17 (3 overs) |

Gujarat Lions won by 6 wickets
Green Park Stadium, Kanpur
Umpires: Anil Chaudhary (India) and C. K. Nandan (India)
Player of the match: Suresh Raina (Gujarat Lions)

- Gujarat Lions won the toss and elected to field.
- Gujarat Lions and Sunrisers Hyderabad qualified for the playoffs and Gujarat Lions advanced to Qualifier 1.

22 May
16:00 (D/N)
Scorecard

| (H) Kolkata Knight Riders; 171/6 (20 overs) | v | Sunrisers Hyderabad; 149/8 (20 overs) |
| Yusuf Pathan 52* (34); Deepak Hooda 2/16 (2 overs) | | Shikhar Dhawan 51 (30); Sunil Narine 3/26 (4 overs) |

Kolkata Knight Riders won by 22 runs
Eden Gardens, Kolkata
Umpires: K. N. Ananthapadmanabhan (India) and Marais Erasmus (South Africa)
Player of the match: Yusuf Pathan (Kolkata Knight Riders)

- Sunrisers Hyderabad won the toss and elected to field.
- Kolkata Knight Riders qualified for the playoffs and Mumbai Indians were eliminated as a result of this match.

22 May
20:00 (D/N)
Scorecard

| (H) Delhi Daredevils; 138/8 (20 overs) | v | Royal Challengers Bangalore; 139/4 (18.1 overs) |
| Quinton de Kock 60 (52); Yuzvendra Chahal 3/32 (4 overs) | | Virat Kohli 54* (45); Carlos Brathwaite 1/18 (3.1 overs) |

Royal Challengers Bangalore won by 6 wickets
Shaheed Veer Narayan Singh International Stadium, Raipur
Umpires: A. Nand Kishore (India) and Bruce Oxenford (Australia)
Player of the match: Virat Kohli (Royal Challengers Bangalore)

- Royal Challengers Bangalore won the toss and elected to field.
- Royal Challengers Bangalore qualified for the playoffs and advanced to Qualifier 1, and Delhi Daredevils were eliminated as a result of this match.

== Playoffs ==
Semifinals
24 May — Bangalore
1 | Gujarat Lions | 158 (20 overs)
2 | Royal Challengers Bangalore | 159/6 (18 overs)
25 May — Delhi
3 | Sunrisers Hyderabad | 162/8 (20 overs)
4 | Kolkata Knight Riders | 140/8 (20 overs)

Preliminary final
27 May — Delhi
1 | Gujarat Lions | 162/7 (20 overs)
3 | Sunrisers Hyderabad | 163/6 (19 overs)

Final
29 May — Bangalore
2 | Royal Challengers Bangalore | 200/7 (20 overs)
3 | Sunrisers Hyderabad | 208/7 (20 overs)

=== Preliminary ===
==== Qualifier 1 ====
24 May
20:00 (D/N)
Scorecard

| Gujarat Lions; 158 (20 overs) | v | Royal Challengers Bangalore; 159/6 (18 overs) |
| Dwayne Smith 73 (41); Shane Watson 4/29 (4 overs) | | AB de Villiers 79* (47); Dhawal Kulkarni 4/14 (4 overs) |

Royal Challengers Bangalore won by 4 wickets
M. Chinnaswamy Stadium, Bangalore
Umpires: Anil Chaudhary (India) and Kumar Dharmasena (Sri Lanka)
Player of the match: AB de Villiers (Royal Challengers Bangalore)

- Royal Challengers Bangalore won the toss and elected to field.

==== Eliminator ====
25 May
20:00 (D/N)
Scorecard

| Sunrisers Hyderabad; 162/8 (20 overs) | v | Kolkata Knight Riders; 140/8 (20 overs) |
| Yuvraj Singh 44 (30); Kuldeep Yadav 3/35 (4 overs) | | Manish Pandey 36 (28); Bhuvneshwar Kumar 3/19 (4 overs) |

Sunrisers Hyderabad won by 22 runs
Feroz Shah Kotla, Delhi
Umpires: Marais Erasmus (South Africa) and Chettithody Shamshuddin (India)
Player of the match: Moises Henriques (Sunrisers Hyderabad)

- Kolkata Knight Riders won the toss and elected to field.

==== Qualifier 2 ====
27 May
20:00 (D/N)
Scorecard

| Gujarat Lions; 162/7 (20 overs) | v | Sunrisers Hyderabad; 163/6 (19 overs) |
| Aaron Finch 50 (32); Ben Cutting 2/20 (3 overs) | | David Warner 93* (58); Shivil Kaushik 2/22 (4 overs) |

Sunrisers Hyderabad won by 4 wickets
Feroz Shah Kotla, Delhi
Umpires: Marais Erasmus (South Africa) and C. K. Nandan (India)
Player of the match: David Warner (Sunrisers Hyderabad)

- Sunrisers Hyderabad won the toss and elected to field.

=== Final ===
29 May
20:00 (D/N)
Scorecard

| Sunrisers Hyderabad; 208/7 (20 overs) | v | Royal Challengers Bangalore; 200/7 (20 overs) |
| David Warner 69 (38); Chris Jordan 3/45 (4 overs) | | Chris Gayle 76 (38); Ben Cutting 2/35 (4 overs) |

Sunrisers Hyderabad won by 8 runs
M. Chinnaswamy Stadium, Bangalore
Attendance: 31,468
Umpires: Kumar Dharmasena (Sri Lanka) and Bruce Oxenford (Australia)
Player of the match: Ben Cutting (Sunrisers Hyderabad)

- Sunrisers Hyderabad won the toss and elected to bat.
- This was the maiden IPL title for Sunrisers Hyderabad and the 2nd IPL Title for an Hyderabadi Franchise.

== Statistics and awards ==
=== Most runs ===
| Player | Team | Mat | Inns | Runs | HS |
|---|---|---|---|---|---|
| Virat Kohli | Royal Challengers Bangalore | 16 | 16 | 973 | 113 |
| David Warner | Sunrisers Hyderabad | 17 | 17 | 848 | 93 * |
| AB de Villiers | Royal Challengers Bangalore | 16 | 16 | 687 | 129 * |
| Gautam Gambhir | Kolkata Knight Riders | 15 | 15 | 501 | 90 * |
| Shikhar Dhawan | Sunrisers Hyderabad | 17 | 17 | 501 | 82 * |

- The player with the most runs at the end of the tournament received the Orange Cap.
- Source: ESPNcricinfo

=== Most wickets ===
| Player | Team | Mat | Inns | Wkts | BBI |
|---|---|---|---|---|---|
| Bhuvneshwar Kumar | Sunrisers Hyderabad | 17 | 17 | 23 | 4/29 |
| Yuzvendra Chahal | Royal Challengers Bangalore | 13 | 13 | 21 | 4/15 |
| Shane Watson | Royal Challengers Bangalore | 16 | 16 | 20 | 4/29 |
| Dhawal Kulkarni | Gujarat Lions | 14 | 14 | 18 | 4/14 |
| Mustafizur Rahman | Sunrisers Hyderabad | 16 | 16 | 17 | 3/16 |

- The player with the most wickets at the end of the tournament received the Purple Cap.
- Source: ESPNcricinfo

=== Special awards ===
| Player | Team | Award |
|---|---|---|
| Virat Kohli | Royal Challengers Bangalore | Most Valuable Player |
| Mustafizur Rahman | Sunrisers Hyderabad | Emerging player award |
| Suresh Raina | Gujarat Lions | Best catch |
| Chris Morris | Delhi Daredevils | Fastest fifty |
| Virat Kohli | Royal Challengers Bangalore | Most sixes |
| David Warner | Sunrisers Hyderabad | Glam shot of the season |
| AB de Villiers | Royal Challengers Bangalore | Best fielder |
| —N/a | Sunrisers Hyderabad | Fairplay award |

== Reception ==
=== Television viewing ===
The first six matches of the season recorded an average Television Viewership Rating (TVR) of 3.50, significantly less than the average TVR of 4.50 for the first week of the 2015 IPL season. It was the second lowest TVR recorded in the opening week of any IPL season, with only the 2014 season with a rating below this.

=== Attendance ===
According to a report in the Economic Times, the season's opening matches at Delhi, Mohali and Kolkata had an average attendance of 60% each, while the first game at Hyderabad had a 50% crowd turnout. The low attendance figures were attributed to "an overdose of Twenty20 cricket and scorching heat". After Bangalore had low attendances in the first two matches at the venue, ticket prices were reduced.

Average home attendances:

- Kolkata Knight Riders 52,800
- Delhi Daredevils 32,800
- Chennai Super Kings 30,400
- Royal Challengers Bangalore 28,000
- Mumbai Indians 26,486
- Sunrisers Hyderabad 26,400
- Kings XI Punjab 20,800
- Rajasthan Royals 18,548
