= Yuzvendra Chahal =

Indian cricketer (born 1990)

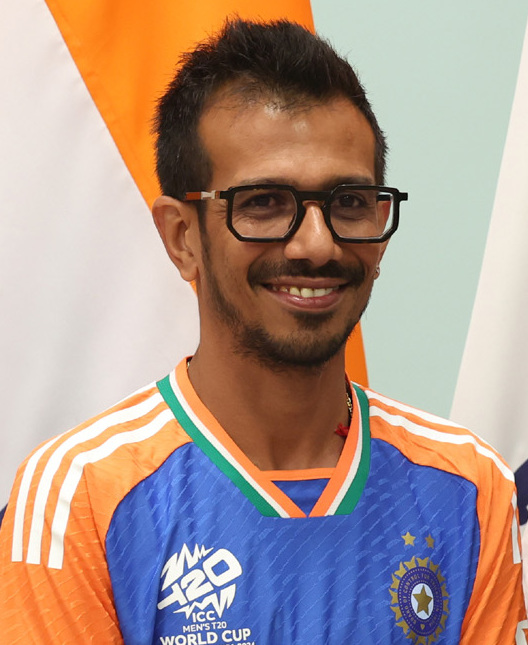
- Chahal in 2024

Personal information
- Born: 23 July 1990 (age 36); Jind, Haryana, India
- Nickname: Yuzi, Chatur Chahal
- Height: 5 ft 6 in (168 cm)
- Batting: Right-handed
- Bowling: Right-arm leg break
- Role: Bowler

International information
- National side: India (2016–2024)
- ODI debut (cap 211): 11 June 2016 v Zimbabwe
- Last ODI: 24 January 2023 v New Zealand
- ODI shirt no.: 3
- T20I debut (cap 60): 19 June 2016 v Zimbabwe
- Last T20I: 13 August 2023 v West Indies
- T20I shirt no.: 3

Domestic team information
- Years: Team
- 2009–present: Haryana (squad no. 3)
- 2011–2013: Mumbai Indians (squad no. 23)
- 2014–2021: Royal Challengers Bangalore (squad no. 3)
- 2022–2024: Rajasthan Royals (squad no. 3)
- 2023: Kent (squad no. 27)
- 2024–2026: Northamptonshire
- 2025–present: Punjab Kings

Career statistics
Competition	ODI	T20I	FC	LA
Matches	72	80	49	151
Runs scored	69	6	451	315
Batting average	8.62	3.00	9.20	10.86
100s/50s	0/0	0/0	0/0	0/0
Top score	18*	3*	48	24*
Balls bowled	3,437	1,764	9,154	7,548
Wickets	121	96	148	240
Bowling average	26.77	25.09	32.27	25.30
5 wickets in innings	2	1	6	6
10 wickets in match	0	0	0	0
Best bowling	6/42	6/25	6/44	6/24
Catches/stumpings	15/–	14/–	17/–	27/–
Medal record
Men's cricket
Representing India
T20 World Cup
Winner	2024 West Indies & USA
Asia Cup
Winner	2018 United Arab Emirates
- Source: ESPNcricinfo, 27 September 2026

Yuzvendra Chahal (born 23 July 1990) is an Indian international cricketer who plays for the India national cricket team in Limited overs cricket as a leg spin bowler. He also represents Haryana in domestic cricket, Punjab Kings in the Indian Premier League, and Northamptonshire in County Championship.

Chahal was the second player, and first Indian, to take a 6 wicket haul in T20I history. He was the first concussion substitute to be named player of the match in an international cricket match. He is a former chess player and represented India internationally. He was part of the Indian team which won the 2024 T20 World Cup; however, he did not feature in any of the matches during the tournament.

== Domestic career ==
Chahal was first signed up by Mumbai Indians in 2011. He appeared in only 1 IPL game across three seasons and that was against Kolkata Knight Riders on 24 April but played in all matches in the 2011 Champions League Twenty20. He took 2 for 9 in 3 overs in the Final against Royal Challengers Bengaluru, helping Mumbai defend the total of 139 and lift the title. At the 2014 IPL players auction, he was signed up by the Royal Challengers for his base price of ₹ 10 lakh. He got the Man of the Match award against Delhi Daredevils in IPL 2014.

In January 2018, he was bought back by the Royal Challengers Bengaluru in the 2018 IPL auction. In February 2022, he was bought by the Rajasthan Royals in the Mega auction for the 2022 Indian Premier League tournament. On 18 April 2022, in the IPL match against the Kolkata Knight Riders, Chahal took a hat-trick and a five-wicket haul. He became the first Indian to take 300 wickets in T20s during Rajasthan Royals' opening match of the 2023 Indian Premier League against the Sunrisers Hyderabad.

In September 2023, Chahal signed for Kent County Cricket Club for the final three matches of the 2023 County Championship season. This was after he not been selected for India's Asia Cup or World Cup teams.

Chahal signed a short-term contract with Northamptonshire County Cricket Club in August 2024, taking 5/14 in his debut appearance for the club in the One-Day Cup against his former team, Kent.

== International career ==
He was named in the 14-man squad to tour Zimbabwe in 2016. He made his One Day International (ODI) debut against Zimbabwe at Harare Sports Club on 11 June 2016, Richmond Mutumbami was his first wicket in ODIs.

In the second match, Chahal took three wickets for just 26 runs and led his team to victory by 8 wickets. In his second over, he delivered a seam-up delivery at a speed of 109 km/h. His bowling performance earned him first international man of the match award as well.

He made his Twenty20 International (T20I) debut against Zimbabwe at Harare on 18 June 2016, Malcolm Waller was his first wicket in T20Is.

On 1 February 2017, he became the first bowler for India to take a five wicket haul in T20Is, ending with figures of 6/25 against England. Yuzvendra Chahal was also the first legspinner to pick up a fifer as well as 6 wicket haul in a T20I and had the record for the best bowling as a legspinner in T20I history (6/25).

He took the most wickets (23) in T20Is in 2017 by any bowler. Chahal is also the first Indian bowler to claim a five-wicket haul in T20Is in the third T20 against England on 1 February 2017.

On 18 January 2019, Chahal took his 2nd One Day International 5 wicket haul by taking 6/42 against Australia. These were the joint best figures by an Indian bowler vs Aussies after Ajit Agarkar in 2003/04. These also were best figures by an Indian spinner at MCG in Australia against Australia. In this match, Australia scored 230 in 48.5 overs while India chased it easily by winning it from 7 wickets courtesy fine knocks from MS Dhoni, Kedar Jadhav.

In April 2019, he was named in India's squad for the 2019 Cricket World Cup. He ended his world cup campaign with 12 wickets. In November 2019, during the third T20I against Bangladesh, he became the third bowler for India to take 50 wickets in T20Is.

On 4 December 2020, in the first T20I match against Australia, Chahal replaced Ravindra Jadeja as a suffering a concussion. Chahal was later named the man of the match, becoming the first concussion substitute to win the man of the match award in an international cricket fixture. In June 2021, he was named in India's One Day International (ODI) squad for their series against Sri Lanka.

He was left out of the Indian 2021 T20 WC squad, prompting several questions and reactions.

In February 2022, in the opening match against the West Indies, Chahal took his 100th wicket in ODI cricket. In June 2022, Chahal was named in India's squad for their T20I series against Ireland.

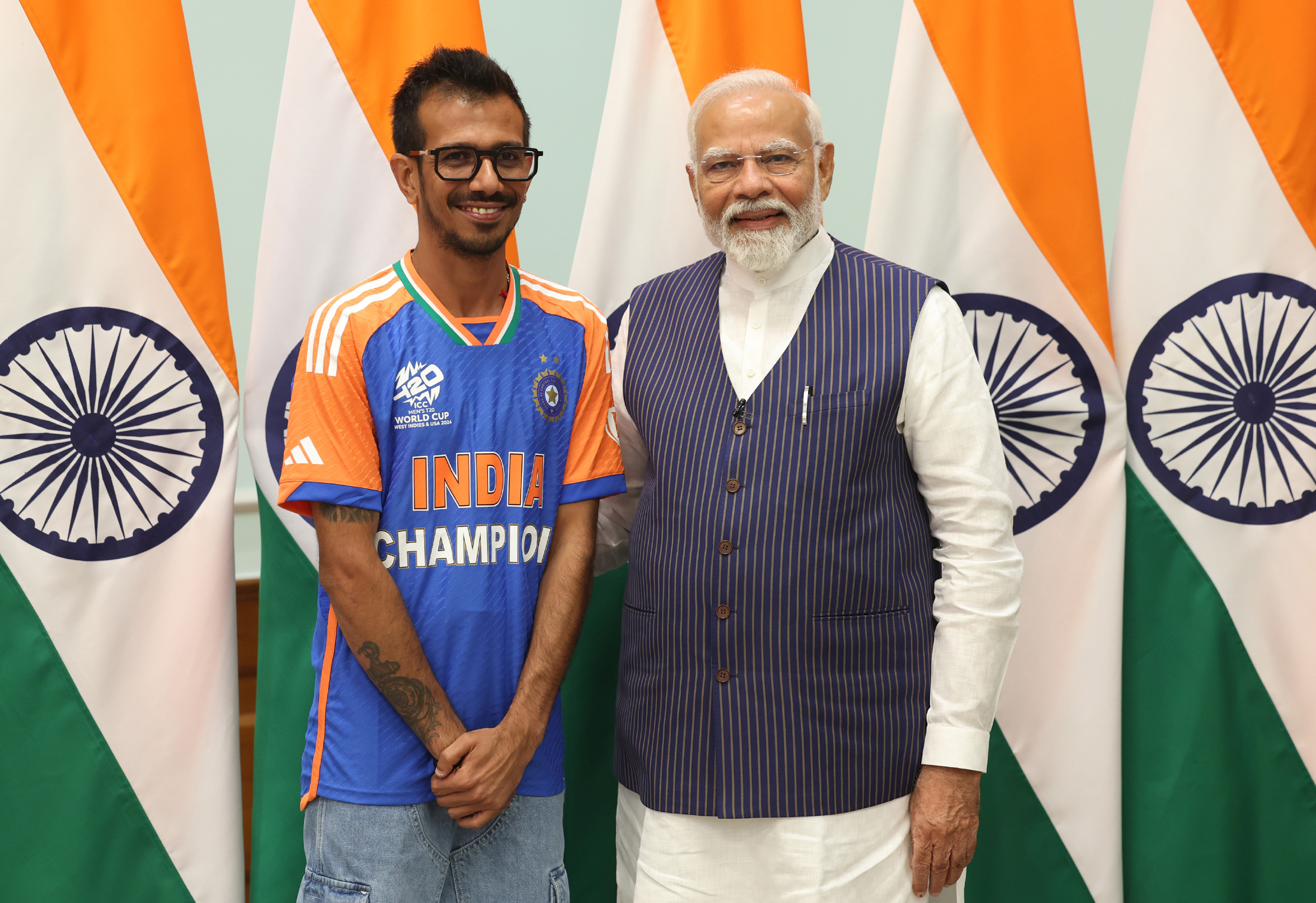
Chahal meeting Narendra Modi in 2024

In April 2024, Chahal became the first player in the history of Indian Premier League to complete 200 wickets. In May 2024, he was named in India's squad for the 2024 Men's T20 World Cup tournament.

== IPL career ==
Chahal played four teams in the Indian Premier League (IPL). Between 2011 and 2013 he played for Mumbai Indians before moving to Royal Challengers Bengaluru where he played between 2014 and 2021, including in the 2016 final losing team. He joined Rajasthan Royals ahead of the 2022 season, and was again on the losing team in the 2022 final. In 2024, he became the first bowler to take 200 IPL career wickets.

After a lackluster start to the 2025 Indian Premier League, Chahal registered figures of 4/28 against the Kolkata Knight Riders on 15 April, helping the Punjab Kings successfully defend 111 runs, which is the lowest IPL total defended to date. He won Player of the Match for this performance.

== Chess career ==
Chahal is the only player to represent India in both chess and cricket. He represented India in chess at the World Youth Chess Championship, though he gave up the game later when he struggled to find a sponsor. He is listed in World Chess Federation's official site; as per FIDE ratings, as of February 2025, Chahal's rating national rank in India was 1,967, while he was ranked 18,641 in Asia and 83,544 in the world.

== Political career ==
On 21 November 2026, Chahal joined the Bhartiya Janta Party (BJP), having been nominated as a special invitee of the BJP OBC Morcha for Delhi. The nomination took place as a result of organizational changes in the party. The induction of Chahal into BJP was confirmed by BJP OBC Morcha National President Amarpal Maurya.

== Personal life ==
Chahal married Dhanashree Verma, a dance choreographer and YouTuber, in December 2020 in Gurgaon. The couple divorced in March 2025.

Chahal is a brand ambassador for the crash game Aviator through a brand partnership with Spribe.

=== Harassment ===
In 2022, he revealed that during his stint with the Mumbai Indians, a drunk teammate dangled him from a 15th floor balcony. He did not name the player, but this revelation led to calls for strict action. He had also been tied up in a room by Andrew Symonds and James Franklin.
