= 2016 Indian Premier League final =

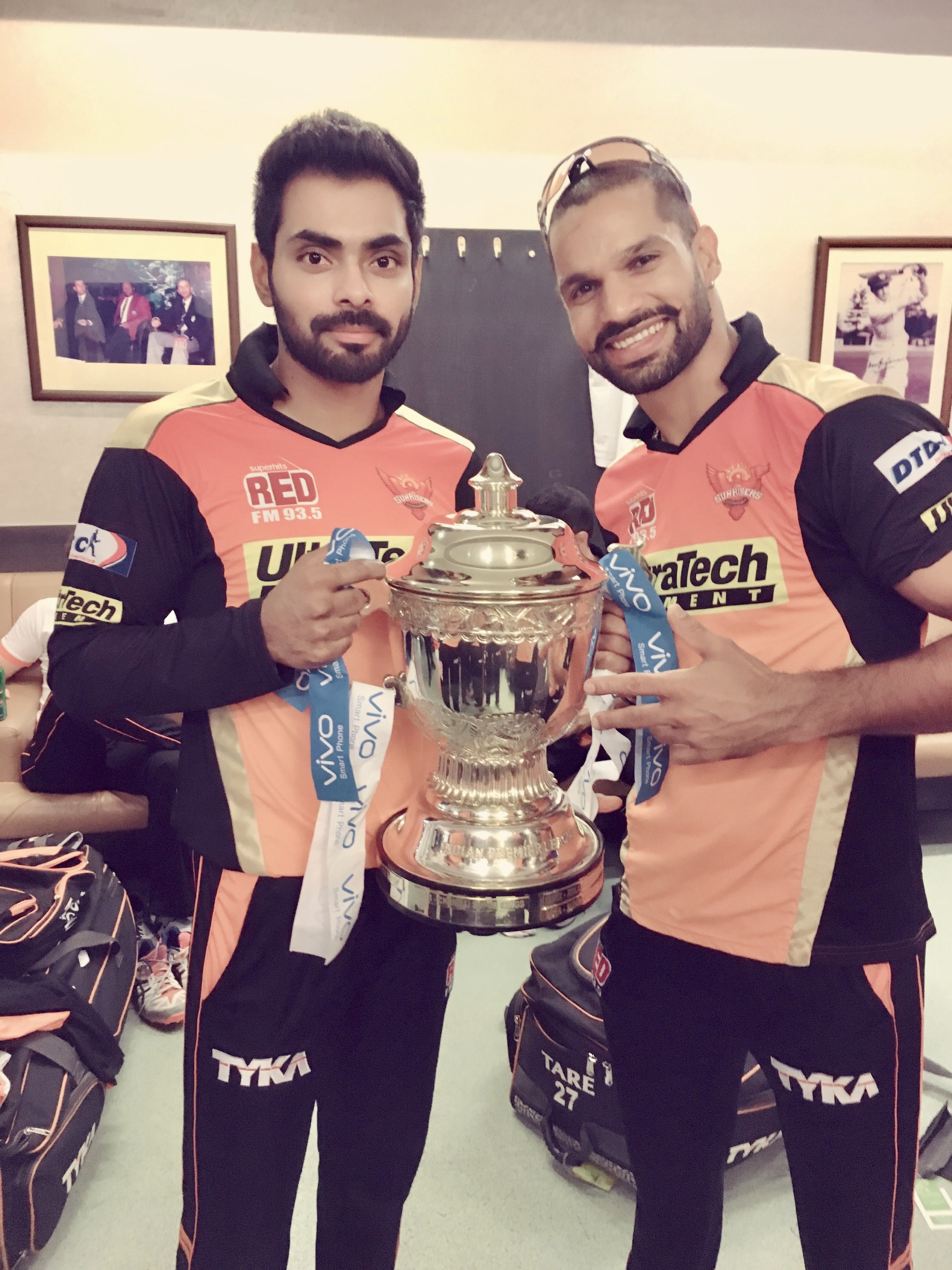
- SRH players Ashish Reddy and Shikhar Dhawan posing with the trophy after the victory.
- Event: 2016 Indian Premier League
Sunrisers Hyderabad	Royal Challengers Bangalore
208/7	200/7
(20 overs)	(20 overs)
- Sunrisers Hyderabad won by 8 runs
- Date: 29 May 2016
- Venue: M. Chinnaswamy Stadium, Bangalore
- Player of the match: Ben Cutting (SRH)
- Umpires: Kumar Dharmasena (SL); Bruce Oxenford (Aus)
- Attendance: 38,468

The 2016 Indian Premier League final was a day/night Twenty20 cricket match on 29 May 2016 at the M. Chinnaswamy Stadium, Bangalore, which was played between Sunrisers Hyderabad and Royal Challengers Bangalore to determine the winner of the 2016 season of the Indian Premier League, an annual Twenty20 cricket tournament in India. In case play was not completed on 29 May, the Final would have resumed on 30 May, the allotted reserve day.

Winning the toss, Sunrisers Hyderabad elected to bat first and set up a big total of 208/7 off 20 overs for their opposition. While chasing 209 to win, Royal Challengers Bangalore managed 200/7 off their 20 overs, thus falling just short of their target. Sunrisers Hyderabad won the match by 8 runs and secured the 2016 Indian Premier League trophy, which happens to be their maiden title in the history of the tournament.

Ben Cutting of Sunrisers Hyderabad was declared the man of the match in the Final, Virat Kohli of Royal Challengers Bangalore was declared the most valuable player of the tournament and Mustafizur Rahman of Sunrisers Hyderabad was declared as the emerging player of the season for the 2016 Indian Premier League.

== Road to the final ==
=== League stage ===
League progression
Team	Group matches														Playoffs		
Team	1	2	3	4	5	6	7	8	9	10	11	12	13	14	Q1/E	Q2	F
Royal Challengers Bangalore	2	2	2	4	4	4	4	6	8	8	10	12	14	16	W		L
Sunrisers Hyderabad	0	0	2	4	6	6	8	10	12	14	14	16	16	16	W	W	W

Win	Loss	No result

- Note: The total points at the end of each group match are listed.
- Note: Click on the points (group matches) or W/L (playoffs) to see the match summary.

== Final ==
=== Background ===
On 26 April, the Supreme Court dismissed the petition against the Bombay High Court's ruling and confirmed that matches should be moved out of Maharashtra including Final which was initially supposed to be held at Mumbai, home of previous season champions. On 29 April, it was announced that all league stage matches scheduled to be held after 1 May in Mumbai and Pune were shifted to the Dr. Y.S. Rajasekhara Reddy ACA-VDCA Cricket Stadium in Visakhapatnam and M. Chinnaswamy Stadium in Bangalore, which was scheduled to host the Qualifier 1, was also announced as the host of the Final.

The final was played at M. Chinnaswamy Stadium, Bangalore, the home of Royal Challengers Bangalore, one of the finalist in 2016 Indian Premier League. This was RCB's third appearance in an IPL final, having lost previous two times. Sunrisers Hyderabad were playing in their maiden final. Hyderabad and Bangalore share their head-to-head record 4–4 but Hyderabad won only once against Bangalore in Bangalore.

Bangalore scored past 200 runs three times (four times after this match) this season including in a match against Hyderabad.

=== Summary ===
After winning the toss, Sunrisers Hyderabad captain David Warner opted to bat first and were given a good start by skipper David Warner and Shikhar Dhawan by showing their intent early on scoring very big on a ground where tall scores have been chased down nonchalantly. The Australian opener was on fire and smashed 69 off 38 balls and set the platform for Hyderabad's win. Yuvraj Singh, who came in at 97/2 in 10th over, sustained Hyderabad's momentum with his free flowing bat-swing. He raced to 38 with four fours and two sixes before falling to Jordan's slower ball. Ben Cutting provided final push in Hyderabad's score clobbering low full-tosses and attempted yorkers of Shane Watson scoring 24 runs in final over which proved at the end to be a valuable match-turning point.

RCB skipper Virat Kohli and West Indian Chris Gayle gave their team the perfect start and in no time reached the 100-run mark without any loss scoring 114 in 10.3 overs with Gayle alone contributing 76. But Hyderabad were able to apply brakes with Gayle's wicket. Hyderabad were able to continue to put pressure on Bangalore taking Gayle, Kohli and de Villiers in the space of 20 balls. Still needing 61 off 37 balls, Watson tried to make up for his lapses with the ball swatting Henriques for a six over long-on but was immediately dismissed along with KL Rahul leaving rest of the team with too much to do in too little time. Bhuvneshwar Kumar, Purple Cap holder in this season, held composure in last overs delivering successive yorkers and giving just 14 runs in 18th and 20th over combined and helped Hyderabad lift their maiden Indian Premier League trophy.

=== Scorecard ===
- On-field umpires: Kumar Dharmasena (SL) and Bruce Oxenford (Aus)
- Third umpire: Anil Chaudhary (Ind)
- Reserve umpire: Abhijit Deshmukh (Ind)
- Match referee: Ranjan Madugalle (SL)
- Toss: Sunrisers Hyderabad won the toss and elected to bat

Sunrisers Hyderabad batting innings
Batsman	Method of dismissal	Runs	Balls	4s	6s	Strike rate
David Warner *	c Iqbal Abdulla b Aravind	69	38	8	3	181.57
Shikhar Dhawan	c Jordan b Chahal	28	25	3	1	112.00
Moises Henriques	c Chahal b Jordan	4	5	0	0	80.00
Yuvraj Singh	c Watson b Jordan	38	23	4	2	165.21
Deepak Hooda	c Kohli b Aravind	3	6	0	0	50.00
Ben Cutting	not out	39	15	3	4	260.00
Naman Ojha †	run out (Watson)	7	4	1	0	175.00
Bipul Sharma	c Chahal b Jordan	5	3	1	0	166.66
Bhuvneshwar Kumar	not out	1	1	0	0	100.00
Barinder Sran	did not bat	–	–	–	–	–
Mustafizur Rahman	did not bat	–	–	–	–	–
Extras	(b 1, lb 2, wd 11)	14				
Total	(20 overs)	208/7	RR: 10.40			

Royal Challengers Bangalore bowling
Bowler	Overs	Maidens	Runs	Wickets	Economy	0s	4s	6s	WD	NB
Sreenath Aravind	4	0	30	2	7.50	9	5	0	0	0
Chris Gayle	3	0	24	0	8.00	8	2	1	2	0
Shane Watson	4	0	61	0	15.25	7	4	6	2	0
Yuzvendra Chahal	4	0	35	1	8.75	5	3	1	0	0
Iqbal Abdulla	1	0	10	0	10.00	1	0	1	0	0
Chris Jordan	4	0	45	3	11.25	9	6	1	2	0

Royal Challengers Bangalore batting innings
Batsman	Method of dismissal	Runs	Balls	4s	6s	Strike rate
Chris Gayle	c Bipul Sharma b Cutting	76	38	4	8	200.00
Virat Kohli *	b Sran	54	35	5	2	154.28
AB de Villiers	c Henriques b Bipul Sharma	5	6	0	0	83.33
KL Rahul †	b Cutting	11	9	1	0	122.22
Shane Watson	c Henriques b Mustafizur	11	9	0	1	122.22
Sachin Baby	not out	18	10	1	1	180.00
Stuart Binny	run out (Hooda/Ojha†)	9	7	0	1	128.57
Chris Jordan	run out (Ojha†)	3	4	0	0	75.00
Iqbal Abdulla	not out	4	2	1	0	200.00
Sreenath Aravind	did not bat	–	–	–	–	–
Yuzvendra Chahal	did not bat	–	–	–	–	–
Extras	(lb 5, wd 4)	9				
Totals	(20 overs)	200/7	RR: 10.00			

Sunrisers Hyderabad bowling
Bowler	Overs	Maidens	Runs	Wickets	Economy	0s	4s	6s	WD	NB
Bhuvneshwar Kumar	4	0	25	0	6.25	13	4	0	1	0
Barinder Sran	3	0	41	1	13.66	6	1	4	2	0
Ben Cutting	4	0	35	2	8.75	7	2	2	1	0
Mustafizur Rahman	4	0	37	1	9.25	9	1	3	0	0
Moises Henriques	3	0	40	0	13.33	5	2	4	0	0
Bipul Sharma	2	0	17	1	8.50	1	2	0	0	0

Source :

Scorecard on ESPNcricinfo

Key

- * – Captain
- † – Wicket-keeper
- c Fielder – the batsman was dismissed by a catch by the named fielder
- b Bowler – the bowler who gains credit for the dismissal
- lbw – the batsman was dismissed leg before wicket
- Total runs are in the format: score/wickets
- b – Bye, lb – Leg bye, nb – No-ball, wd – Wide, RR – Run rate
