= List of Indian Premier League records and statistics =

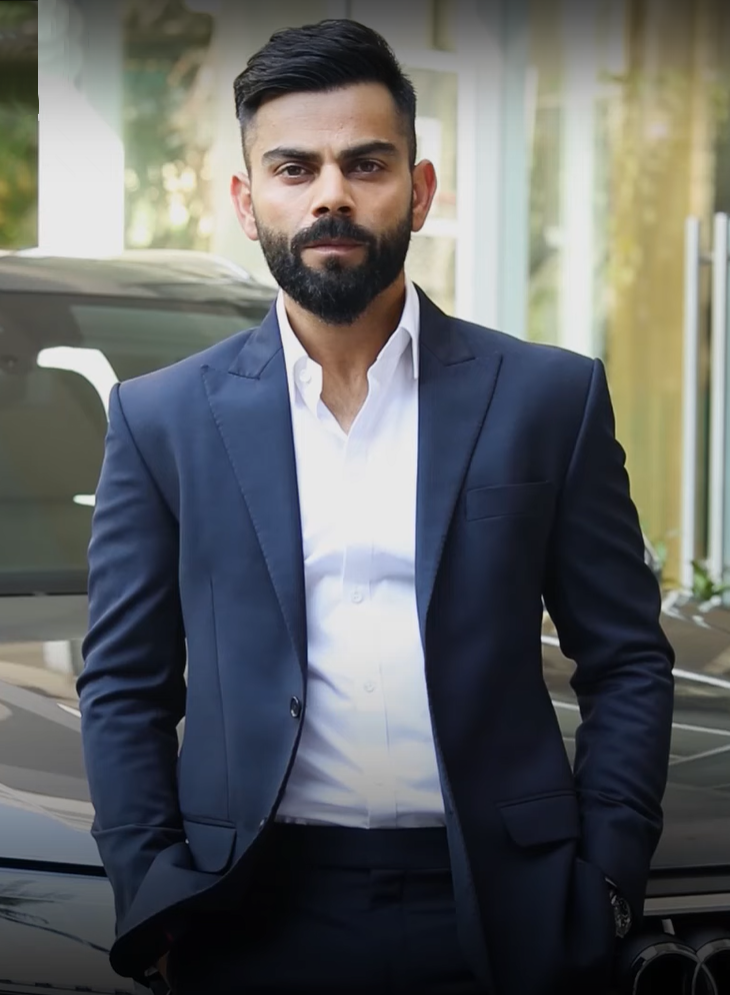
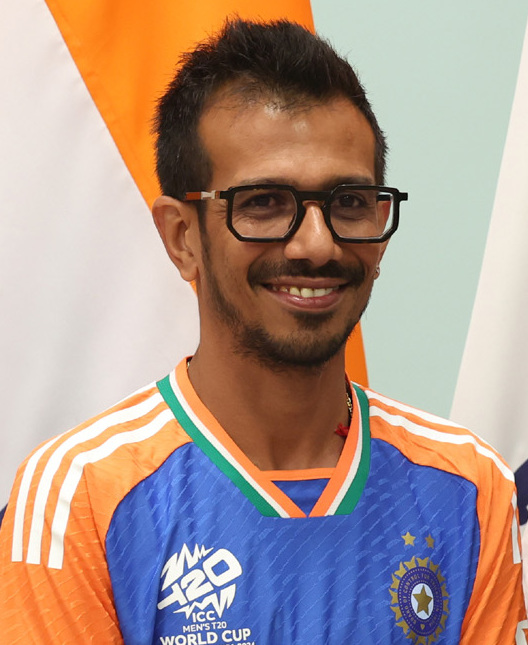
Virat Kohli (left) holds the all time record for most runs scored in the league, while Yuzvendra Chahal (right) holds the distinction for most wickets taken

The Indian Premier League (IPL) is a men's Twenty20 (T20) cricket league, organized by the Board of Control for Cricket in India, the national governing body of cricket in India. T20 cricket is a shorter format of the game, with each team playing a single innings of 20 overs. The inaugural season of the IPL was held in 2008, and the tournament has been held annually in India (Note: The tournament has also been held outside India on several occasions: in 2009 in South Africa and in 2014 in the UAE due to general elections, and in the UAE in 2020 and 2021 due to the COVID-19 pandemic.) ever since. Currently, ten teams compete for the championship. Since the league's inception, eight teams have won the title, with the Mumbai Indians and Chennai Super Kings both securing five titles each.

Indian batsman Virat Kohli holds the records for the most runs scored (9,336), the most centuries (9), most half-centuries (68), most runs in a single season (973), most runs as a captain (4,994) and the most catches (126). Indian bowler Yuzvendra Chahal holds the record for the most wickets taken (231).

Indian batsman Rohit Sharma and wicket-keeper MS Dhoni are the most successful captains in the league, each winning five titles. Dhoni also holds the record for the most matches played. West Indies batsman Chris Gayle holds several individual batting records, including the highest individual score in a match (175*), the most sixes scored (357), the most sixes in a match (17), and the fastest century (off 30 balls). West Indies bowler Alzarri Joseph holds the record for the best bowling figures with 6/12.

The Mumbai Indians hold the record for playing and winning the most matches, while the Gujarat Titans (GT) have the highest win percentage (61.03%). Sunrisers Hyderabad (SRH) scored the most runs in a match with a score of 287/3 against the Royal Challengers Bengaluru (RCB) in 2024, breaking their own record of 277/3 against the Mumbai Indians earlier in the same season. The highest successful run chase in the league's history was achieved by the Punjab Kings (PBKS), as they chased down a target of 265 set by the Delhi Capitals (DC) in 2026. The Royal Challengers Bengaluru scored the lowest total, making just 49 runs against the Kolkata Knight Riders in 2017.

== Listing criteria ==
In general, the top five are listed in each category, except when there is a tie for the last place among the five, in which case all the tied record holders are noted.

== Listing notation ==
Team notation

- (200/3) indicates that a team scored 200 runs for three wickets and the innings was closed, either due to a successful run chase or if no playing time remained
- (200) indicates that a team scored 200 runs and was all out

Batting notation

- (100) indicates that a batsman scored 100 runs and was out
- (100*) indicates that a batsman scored 100 runs and was not out

Bowling notation

- (5/20) indicates that a bowler has captured five wickets while conceding 20 runs

Currently playing

- † indicates a current cricketer

Date

- indicates the date the match was played

== Team records ==
=== By season ===
Out of the fifteen franchises that have played in the league, Chennai Super Kings and Mumbai Indians are the most successful teams in the league's history with five titles each, with Kolkata Knight Riders having won three titles and Royal Challengers Bengaluru having won two titles. The teams who have won the title once are Rajasthan Royals, Deccan Chargers, Sunrisers Hyderabad and Gujarat Titans. The current champions are Royal Challengers Bengaluru, who defeated Gujarat Titans in the 2026 Indian Premier League final to win their second consecutive title, becoming only the third team after Chennai Super Kings and Mumbai Indians to successfully defend an IPL title.

Season	2008	2009	2010	2011	2012	2013	2014	2015	2016	2017	2018	2019	2020	2021	2022	2023	2024	2025	2026
Chennai Super Kings	RU	SF	C	C	RU	RU	PO	RU	Suspended		C	RU	7th	C	9th	C	5th	10th	8th
Delhi Capitals	SF	SF	5th	10th	PO	9th	8th	7th	6th	6th	8th	PO	RU	PO	5th	9th	6th	5th	6th
Gujarat Titans	–														C	RU	8th	PO	RU
Kolkata Knight Riders	6th	8th	6th	PO	C	7th	C	5th	PO	PO	PO	5th	5th	RU	7th	7th	C	8th	7th
Lucknow Super Giants	–														PO	PO	7th	7th	10th
Mumbai Indians	5th	7th	RU	PO	PO	C	PO	C	5th	C	5th	C	C	5th	10th	PO	10th	PO	9th
Punjab Kings	SF	5th	8th	5th	6th	6th	RU	8th	8th	5th	7th	6th	6th	6th	6th	8th	9th	RU	5th
Rajasthan Royals	C	6th	7th	6th	7th	PO	5th	PO	Suspended		PO	7th	8th	7th	RU	5th	PO	9th	PO
Royal Challengers Bengaluru	7th	RU	3rd	RU	5th	5th	7th	PO	RU	8th	6th	8th	PO	PO	PO	6th	PO	C	C
Sunrisers Hyderabad	–					PO	6th	6th	C	PO	RU	PO	PO	8th	8th	10th	RU	6th	PO
Defunct Teams
Deccan Chargers	8th	C	4th	7th	8th	–													
Kochi Tuskers Kerala	–			8th	–														
Pune Warriors India	–			9th	9th	8th	–												
Gujarat Lions	–								PO	7th	–								
Rising Pune Supergiant	–								7th	RU	–								

- Current teams are listed alphabetically. Defunct teams are listed by order of entry to the league, then alphabetically.

^{†} Team now defunct

- C: champions
- RU: runner-up
- 3rd: team won the 3rd place playoff. A third-place playoff only took place in 2010

=== Team wins, losses and draws ===
Teams are ordered by best result then by winning percentage, then alphabetically:

Team	Appearances			Best result	Statistics						
Team	Total	First	Latest	Best result	Played	Won	Lost	Tied+W	Tied+L	NR	Win%
Chennai Super Kings	17	2008	2026	Champions (2010, 2011, 2018, 2021, 2023)	267	148	116	0	1	2	55.84
Mumbai Indians	19	2008	2026	Champions (2013, 2015, 2017, 2019, 2020)	291	155	132	2	2	0	53.95
Kolkata Knight Riders	19	2008	2026	Champions (2012, 2014, 2024)	279	140	131	2	3	3	51.44
Royal Challengers Bengaluru	19	2008	2026	Champions (2025, 2026)	287	143	137	2	1	4	51.23
Gujarat Titans	5	2022	2026	Champions (2022)	77	47	30	0	0	0	61.03
Rajasthan Royals	17	2008	2026	Champions (2008)	252	123	122	2	2	3	50.20
Sunrisers Hyderabad	14	2013	2026	Champions (2016)	211	102	104	1	3	1	49.04
Punjab Kings	19	2008	2026	Runners-up (2014, 2025)	277	126	145	3	1	2	46.90
Delhi Capitals	19	2008	2026	Runners-up (2020)	280	125	147	4	1	3	46.57
Lucknow Super Giants	5	2022	2026	Eliminator (2022, 2023)	72	34	36	0	1	1	47.88
Deccan Chargers	5	2008	2012	Champions (2009)	75	29	46	0	0	0	38.66
Rising Pune Supergiant	2	2016	2017	Runners-up (2017)	30	15	15	0	0	0	50.00
Gujarat Lions	2	2016	2017	Qualifier 2 (2016)	30	13	16	0	1	0	43.33
Kochi Tuskers Kerala	1	2011	2011	Group Stage (2011)	14	6	8	0	0	0	42.85
Pune Warriors India	3	2011	2013	Group Stage (2011, 2012, 2013)	46	12	33	0	0	1	26.08

Team now defunct
Source: ESPNCricinfo (Last updated: 31 May 2026)

Notes:

- Tie+W and Tie+L indicates matches tied and then won or lost by super over
- The result percentage excludes no results and counts ties (irrespective of a tiebreaker) as half a win

== Result records ==
=== Greatest win margin (by runs) ===
Margin	Team	Opposition	Venue	Date
146 Runs	MI	DD	Arun Jaitley Stadium, Delhi	6 May 2017
144 Runs	RCB	GL	M. Chinnaswamy Stadium, Bengaluru	14 May 2016
140 Runs	KKR	RCB	M. Chinnaswamy Stadium, Bengaluru	18 April 2008
138 Runs	RCB	KXIP	M. Chinnaswamy Stadium, Bengaluru	6 May 2015
130 Runs	RCB	PWI	M. Chinnaswamy Stadium, Bengaluru	23 April 2013
Last updated: 5 May 2026

=== Greatest win margin (by balls remaining) ===
Balls remaining	Margin	Team	Opposition	Venue	Date
87	8 wickets	MI	KKR	Wankhede Stadium, Mumbai, India	16 May 2008
81	9 wickets	RCB	DC	Arun Jaitley Cricket Stadium, Delhi, India	27 April 2026
76	8 wickets	KTK	RR	Holkar Stadium, Indore, India	15 May 2011
73	10 wickets	KXIP	DD	Punjab Cricket Association Stadium, Mohali, India	30 April 2017
72	9 wickets	SRH	RCB	Brabourne Stadium, Mumbai, India	23 April 2022
Last updated: 27 April 2026

=== Greatest win margin (by 10 wickets) ===
Teams have won by ten wickets on 15 occasions. The first time this occurred was during the 2008 season when Deccan Chargers beat Mumbai Indians at the Wankhede Stadium in Mumbai. The most recent time a team won by ten wickets was in 2024 when Sunrisers Hyderabad beat Lucknow Super Giants at the Rajiv Gandhi International Cricket Stadium in Hyderabad.

Number of Victories	Team	Latest
4	RCB	22 April 2021
3	SRH	8 May 2024
2	MI	23 October 2020
2	CSK	4 October 2020
1	DEC	27 April 2008
1	RR	20 May 2011
1	KKR	7 April 2017
1	PBKS	30 April 2017
Last updated: 25 May 2024

=== Narrowest win margin (by 1 run) ===
Teams have won by a single run on 16 occasions. The first time this occurred was during the 2008 season when Kings XI Punjab beat Mumbai Indians at the Wankhede Stadium in Mumbai. The most recent occurrence was in 2026 when Gujarat Titans beat Delhi Capitals at the Arun Jaitley Stadium in Delhi.

Number of Victories	Team	Latest
3	MI	12 May 2019
3	RCB	27 April 2021
2	KKR	4 May 2025
2	PBKS	17 May 2009
1	DD	29 April 2012
1	CSK	9 April 2015
1	GL	27 April 2016
1	GT	8 April 2026
1	LSG	23 May 2023
1	SRH	2 May 2024
Last updated: 8 April 2026

=== Narrowest win margin (by balls remaining) ===
Teams have won off the last ball on 47 occasions. The first time this occurred was during the 2008 season when Chennai Super Kings beat Delhi Daredevils at the Arun Jaitley Stadium in Delhi. The most recent time a team with zero balls remaining was in 2026 when Royal Challengers Bengaluru beat Mumbai Indians at the Shaheed Veer Narayan Singh International Cricket Stadium in Raipur.

Number of Victories	Team	Latest
9	CSK	28 May 2023
7	MI	11 April 2023
5	RR	16 April 2024
4	GT	6 May 2025
4	PBKS	30 April 2023
4	RCB	10 May 2026
3	KKR	8 May 2023
2	DC	14 April 2018
2	GL	29 April 2016
2	LSG	9 April 2026
2	SRH	7 May 2023
2	RSPG	22 April 2017
1	DCH	16 May 2009
Last updated: 9 April 2026

=== Narrowest win margin (by wickets) ===
Teams have won matches by one wicket on five occasions:

Team	Opposition	Venue	Date
KKR	PBKS	Eden Gardens, Kolkata, India	9 May 2015
CSK	MI	Wankhede Stadium, Mumbai, India	7 April 2018
SRH	MI	Rajiv Gandhi International Cricket Stadium, Hyderabad, India	12 April 2018
LSG	RCB	M. Chinnaswamy Stadium, Bengaluru, India	10 April 2023
DC	LSG	ACA–VDCA Cricket Stadium, Visakhapatnam, India	24 March 2025
Last updated: 24 March 2025

=== Highest successful chases ===
Score	Team	Opposition	Target	Venue	Date
265/4	PBKS	DC	265	Arun Jaitley Cricket Stadium, New Delhi, India	25 April 2026
262/2	PBKS	KKR	262	Eden Gardens, Kolkata, India	26 April 2024
247/2	SRH	PBKS	246	Rajiv Gandhi International Cricket Stadium, Hyderabad, India	12 April 2025
249/4	SRH	MI	244	Wankhede Stadium, Mumbai, India	29 April 2026
229/5	SRH	RR	229	Sawai Mansingh Stadium, Jaipur, India	25 April 2026
Last updated: 29 April 2026

=== Lowest successful defence ===
Target	Team	Opposition	Score	Venue	Date
112	PBKS	KKR	95	Maharaja Yadavindra Singh International Cricket Stadium, Mullanpur, India	15 April 2025
117	CSK	PBKS	92/8	Kingsmead, Durban, South Africa	20 May 2009
119	SRH	MI	87	Wankhede Stadium, Mumbai, India	24 April 2018
120	PBKS	MI	116/7	Kingsmead, Durban, South Africa	29 April 2009
120	SRH	PWI	108	Maharashtra Cricket Association Stadium, Pune, India	17 April 2013
120	MI	PWI	119/6	Maharashtra Cricket Association Stadium, Pune, India	3 May 2012
Last updated: 15 April 2025

=== Tied Matches ===
As of 2026, matches have resulted in a tie on 16 occasions. The first time a match was tied in the league was during the 2009 season when Kolkata Knight Riders and Rajasthan Royals played in a match at Newlands in South Africa. The most recent tie occurred during the 2026 season when Lucknow Super Giants and Kolkata Knight Riders played at Lucknow. All tied matches in the IPL are resolved by using a super over.

== Team scoring records ==
=== Highest team total ===
As of 5 May 2026

Score	Team	Opposition	Venue	Date
287/3	Sunrisers Hyderabad	Royal Challengers Bengaluru	M. Chinnaswamy Stadium, Bengaluru	15 April 2024
286/6	Sunrisers Hyderabad	Rajasthan Royals	Rajiv Gandhi International Cricket Stadium, Hyderabad	23 March 2025
278/3	Sunrisers Hyderabad	Kolkata Knight Riders	Arun Jaitley Stadium, Delhi	25 May 2025
277/3	Sunrisers Hyderabad	Mumbai Indians	Rajiv Gandhi International Cricket Stadium, Hyderabad	27 March 2024
272/7	Kolkata Knight Riders	Delhi Capitals	ACA–VDCA Cricket Stadium, Visakhapatnam	3 April 2024

- Source: ESPNcricinfo

=== Lowest team total ===
As of 5 May 2026

Score	Team	Opposition	Venue	Date
49	Royal Challengers Bengaluru	Kolkata Knight Riders	Eden Gardens, Kolkata, India	23 April 2017
58	Rajasthan Royals	Royal Challengers Bengaluru	Newlands, Cape Town, South Africa	18 April 2009
59	Rajasthan Royals	Royal Challengers Bengaluru	Sawai Mansingh Stadium, Jaipur, India	14 May 2023
66	Delhi Capitals	Mumbai Indians	Arun Jaitley Stadium, Delhi, India	6 May 2017
67	Delhi Capitals	Punjab Kings	Inderjit Singh Bindra Stadium, Mohali, India	30 April 2017
67	Kolkata Knight Riders	Mumbai Indians	Wankhede Stadium, Mumbai, India	16 May 2008

- Source: ESPNcricinfo

=== Highest match aggregate ===
As of 25 April 2026

Aggregate	Team 1	Score 1	Team 2	Score 2	Venue	Date
549/10	SRH	287/3	RCB	262/7	M. Chinnaswamy Stadium, Bengaluru	15 April 2024
529/6	DC	264/2	PBKS	265/4	Arun Jaitley Cricket Stadium, New Delhi	25 April 2026
528/12	SRH	286/6	RR	242/6	Rajiv Gandhi International Cricket Stadium, Hyderabad	23 March 2025
523/8	SRH	277/3	MI	246/5	Rajiv Gandhi International Cricket Stadium, Hyderabad	27 March 2024
523/8	KKR	261/6	PBKS	262/2	Eden Gardens, Kolkata	26 April 2024

- Source: ESPNcricinfo

=== Lowest match aggregate ===
As of 5 May 2026

Aggregate	Team 1	Score 1	Team 2	Score 2	Venue	Date
135	DD	67	PBKS	68/0	Punjab Cricket Association Stadium, Mohali, India	30 April 2017
135	KKR	67	MI	68/2	Wankhede Stadium, Mumbai, India	16 May 2008
140	RCB	68	SRH	72/1	Brabourne Stadium, Mumbai, India	23 April 2022
141	RCB	70	CSK	71/3	M. A. Chidambaram Stadium, Chennai, India	23 March 2019
141	RCB	70	RR	71/4	Sheikh Zayed Stadium, Abu Dhabi, UAE	26 April 2014

- Source: ESPNcricinfo

== Individual championship wins ==
Players with four or more Indian Premier League titles.

Wins	Player	Franchise(s)
6	(India) Ambati Rayudu	Mumbai Indians (2013, 2015, 2017); Chennai Super Kings (2018, 2021, 2023)
6	(India) Rohit Sharma	Deccan Chargers (2009); Mumbai Indians (2013, 2015, 2017, 2019, 2020)
5	(India) Jasprit Bumrah	Mumbai Indians (2013, 2015, 2017, 2019, 2020)
5	(Cricket West Indies) Kieron Pollard	Mumbai Indians (2013, 2015, 2017, 2019, 2020)
5	(India) MS Dhoni	Chennai Super Kings (2010, 2011, 2018, 2021, 2023)
5	(India) Hardik Pandya	Mumbai Indians (2015, 2017, 2019, 2020); Gujarat Titans (2022)
5	(India) Krunal Pandya	Mumbai Indians (2017, 2019, 2020); Royal Challengers Bengaluru (2025, 2026)
5	(India) Aditya Tare	Mumbai Indians (2013, 2015, 2019, 2020); Sunrisers Hyderabad (2016)
4	(India) Harbhajan Singh	Mumbai Indians (2013, 2015, 2017); Chennai Super Kings (2018)
4	(Australia) Josh Hazlewood	Mumbai Indians (2015); Chennai Super Kings (2021); Royal Challengers Bengaluru (2025, 2026)
4	(India) Ravindra Jadeja	Rajasthan Royals (2008); Chennai Super Kings (2018, 2021, 2023)
4	(India) Karn Sharma	Sunrisers Hyderabad (2016); Mumbai Indians (2017); Chennai Super Kings (2018, 2021)
4	(Sri Lanka) Lasith Malinga	Mumbai Indians (2013, 2015, 2017, 2019)
4	(New Zealand) Mitchell McClenaghan	Mumbai Indians (2015, 2017, 2019, 2020)
4	(India) Suresh Raina	Chennai Super Kings (2010, 2011, 2018, 2021)
4	(India) Suryakumar Yadav	Mumbai Indians (2013, 2019, 2020); Kolkata Knight Riders (2014)

== Individual batting records ==
=== Most career runs ===
As of 31 May 2026

Runs	Player	Teams	Innings	Seasons
9,336	Virat Kohli†	RCB	275	2008–2026
7,329	Rohit Sharma†	DEC/MI	276	2008–2026
6,769	Shikhar Dhawan	DC/DEC/MI/SRH/PBKS	221	2008–2024
6,565	David Warner	DC/SRH	184	2009–2024
5,815	KL Rahul†	DC/KXIP/LSG/PBKS/RCB/SRH	150	2013–2026

- Source: ESPNcricinfo

=== Highest individual score ===
As of 25 April 2026

Runs	Player	Team	Opposition	Venue	Date
175*	Chris Gayle	RCB	PWI	M. Chinnaswamy Stadium, Bengaluru	23 April 2013
158*	Brendon McCullum	KKR	RCB	M. Chinnaswamy Stadium, Bengaluru	18 April 2008
152*	KL Rahul †	DC	PBKS	Arun Jaitley Cricket Stadium, New Delhi	25 April 2026
141	Abhishek Sharma †	SRH	PBKS	Rajiv Gandhi International Cricket Stadium, Hyderabad	12 April 2025
140*	Quinton de Kock †	LSG	KKR	DY Patil Stadium, Mumbai	18 May 2022

- Source: ESPNcricinfo

=== Most centuries ===
As of 2026, 125 centuries have been scored in IPL matches.

Tons	Player	Teams	Career
9	Virat Kohli†	RCB	2008–2026
7	Jos Buttler†	MI/RR/GT	2016–2026
6	Chris Gayle	KKR/RCB/KXIP	2009–2021
6	KL Rahul†	RCB/SRH/PBKS/LSG/DC	2013–2026
5	Shubman Gill†	GT/KKR	2018–2026
5	Sanju Samson†	CSK/DD/RR	2013–2026

- Source: ESPNcricinfo

=== Most runs in a season ===
As of 31 May 2026

Runs	Player	Team	Season
973	Virat Kohli†	RCB	2016
890	Shubman Gill†	GT	2023
863	Jos Buttler†	RR	2022
848	David Warner	SRH	2016
776	Vaibhav Sooryavanshi†	RR	2026

- Source: ESPNcricinfo

=== Most career sixes ===
As of 31 May 2026

Sixes	Player	Teams	Seasons
357	Chris Gayle	KKR/RCB/PBKS	2009–2021
323	Rohit Sharma†	DEC/MI	2008–2026
316	Virat Kohli†	RCB	2008–2026
264	MS Dhoni†	CSK/RPS	2008–2025
251	AB de Villiers	DD/RCB	2008–2021

- Source: ESPNcricinfo

=== Most career fours ===
As of 31 May 2026

Fours	Player	Teams	Seasons
844	Virat Kohli †	RCB	2008–present
768	Shikhar Dhawan	DCH/DC/MI/PBKS/SRH	2008–2024
663	David Warner	DC/SRH	2009–2024
661	Rohit Sharma †	DCH/MI	2008–present
539	Ajinkya Rahane †	CSK/DC/KKR/MI/RR/RPS	2008–present

- Source: ESPNcricinfo

=== Most sixes in an innings ===
As of 27 May 2026

Sixes	Player	Team	Opposition	Venue	Date
17	Chris Gayle	RCB	PWI	M. Chinnaswamy Stadium, Bengaluru, India	23 April 2013
13	Brendon McCullum	KKR	RCB	M. Chinnaswamy Stadium, Bengaluru, India	18 April 2008
13	Chris Gayle	RCB	DD	Arun Jaitley Stadium, Delhi, India	17 May 2012
12	Chris Gayle	RCB	PBKS	M. Chinnaswamy Stadium, Bengaluru, India	6 May 2015
12	AB de Villiers	RCB	GL	M. Chinnaswamy Stadium, Bengaluru, India	14 May 2016
12	Vaibhav Sooryavanshi	RR	SRH	Sawai Mansingh Stadium, Jaipur, India	25 Apr 2026
12	Vaibhav Sooryavanshi	RR	SRH	Maharaja Yadavindra Singh International Cricket Stadium, Mullanpur, India	27 May 2026

- Source: ESPNcricinfo

== Individual bowling records ==
=== Most career wickets ===
As of 31 May 2026

Wickets	Player	Team	Innings	Seasons
233	Yuzvendra Chahal†	MI/PBKS/RCB/RR	184	2013–2026
226	Bhuvneshwar Kumar†	PWI/RCB/SRH	206	2011–2026
207	Sunil Narine†	KKR	200	2012–2026
192	Piyush Chawla	PBKS/KKR/CSK/MI	191	2008–2024
187	Ravichandran Ashwin	CSK/DC/KXIP/RPS/RR	217	2009–2025
187	Jasprit Bumrah†	MI	158	2013–2026

- Source: ESPNcricinfo

=== Best bowling figures ===
As of 6 May 2026

Figures	Player	Team	Opposition	Venue	Date
6/12	Alzarri Joseph†	MI	SRH	Rajiv Gandhi International Cricket Stadium, Hyderabad	6 April 2019
6/14	Sohail Tanvir	RR	CSK	Sawai Mansingh Stadium, Jaipur	4 May 2008
6/19	Adam Zampa†	RPS	SRH	ACA-VDCA Cricket Stadium, Visakhapatnam	10 May 2016
5/5	Anil Kumble	RCB	RR	Newlands, Cape Town	18 April 2009
5/5	Akash Madhwal†	MI	LSG	M. A. Chidambaram Stadium, Chennai	24 May 2023

- Source: ESPNcricinfo

=== Five-wicket hauls ===
As of 2026, there have been 38 five-wicket hauls in IPL matches.

=== Hat-tricks ===
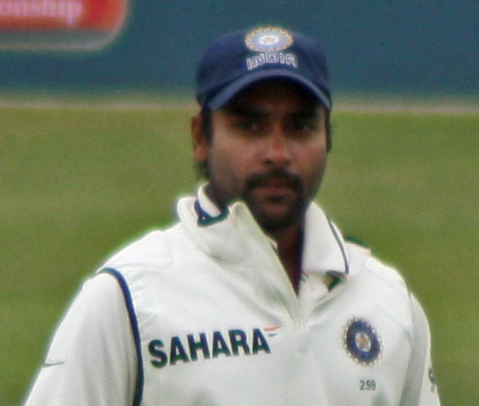
Amit Mishra is the only bowler to have taken three IPL hat-tricks.

As of April 2025, 23 hat-tricks have been taken in IPL matches. The feat was first achieved by Lakshmipathy Balaji in a 2008 match between Chennai Super Kings and Punjab Kings at Chennai. The most recent hat-trick in the league was taken in 2025 by Yuzvendra Chahal playing for Punjab Kings against Chennai Super Kings at Chennai.

List of Indian Premier League hat-tricks
No.	Player	Team	Opponents	Venue	Season
1	Lakshmipathy Balaji	Chennai Super Kings	Punjab Kings	Chennai	2008
2	Amit Mishra (1/3)	Delhi Capitals	Deccan Chargers	Delhi	2008
3	Makhaya Ntini	Chennai Super Kings	Kolkata Knight Riders	Kolkata	2008
4	Yuvraj Singh (1/2)	Punjab Kings	Royal Challengers Bangalore	Durban	2009
5	Rohit Sharma†	Deccan Chargers	Mumbai Indians	Centurion	2009
6	Yuvraj Singh (2/2)	Punjab Kings	Deccan Chargers	Johannesburg	2009
7	Praveen Kumar	Royal Challengers Bangalore	Rajasthan Royals	Bengaluru	2010
8	Amit Mishra (2/3)	Deccan Chargers	Punjab Kings	Dharamsala	2011
9	Ajit Chandila	Rajasthan Royals	Pune Warriors India	Jaipur	2012
10	Sunil Narine†	Kolkata Knight Riders	Punjab Kings	Mohali	2013
11	Amit Mishra (3/3)	Sunrisers Hyderabad	Pune Warriors	Pune	2013
12	Pravin Tambe	Rajasthan Royals	Kolkata Knight Riders	Ahmedabad	2014
13	Shane Watson	Rajasthan Royals	Sunrisers Hyderabad	Ahmedabad	2014
14	Axar Patel†	Punjab Kings	Gujarat Lions	Rajkot	2016
15	Samuel Badree	Royal Challengers Bangalore	Mumbai Indians	Bengaluru	2017
16	Andrew Tye†	Gujarat Lions	Rising Pune Supergiants	Rajkot	2017
17	Jaydev Unadkat†	Rising Pune Supergiants	Sunrisers Hyderabad	Hyderabad	2017
18	Sam Curran†	Punjab Kings	Delhi Capitals	Chandigarh	2019
19	Shreyas Gopal†	Rajasthan Royals	Royal Challengers Bangalore	Bengaluru	2019
20	Harshal Patel†	Royal Challengers Bangalore	Mumbai Indians	Dubai	2021
21	Yuzvendra Chahal (1/2)	Rajasthan Royals	Kolkata Knight Riders	Brabourne	2022
22	Rashid Khan†	Gujarat Titans	Kolkata Knight Riders	Ahmedabad	2023
23	Yuzvendra Chahal (2/2)	Punjab Kings	Chennai Super Kings	Chennai	2025

=== Most wickets in a season ===
As of 31 May 2026

Wickets	Player	Team	Season
32	Harshal Patel†	RCB	2021
32	Dwayne Bravo	CSK	2013
30	Kagiso Rabada†	DC	2020
29	Kagiso Rabada†	GT	2026
28	Lasith Malinga	MI	2011
28	James Faulkner	RR	2013
28	Bhuvneshwar Kumar†	RCB	2026
28	Mohammed Shami†	GT	2023

- Source: ESPNcricinfo

=== Most runs conceded in a match ===
As of 3 June 2025

Runs conceded	Player	Team	Opposition	Venue	Date
76	Jofra Archer†	RR	SRH	Rajiv Gandhi International Cricket Stadium, Hyderabad, India	23 March 2025
75	Mohammed Shami†	SRH	PBKS	Rajiv Gandhi International Cricket Stadium, Hyderabad, India	12 April 2025
74	Will O'Rourke†	LSG	RCB	Ekana Cricket Stadium, Lucknow, India	27 May 2025
73	Mohit Sharma†	GT	DC	Arun Jaitley Stadium, Delhi, India	24 April 2024
70	Basil Thampi	SRH	RCB	M. Chinnaswamy Stadium, Bengaluru, India	17 May 2018

- Source: ESPNcricinfo

== Individual wicket-keeping records ==
=== Most career dismissals ===
As of 20 May 2026

Dismissals	Player	Teams	Innings	Seasons
201	MS Dhoni†	CSK/RPS	271	2008–2025
174	Dinesh Karthik	DD/GL/KKR/KXIP/MI/RCB	235	2008–2024
113	Wriddhiman Saha	CSK/GT/KKR/KXIP/SRH	149	2008–2024
111	Rishabh Pant†	DC/LSG	126	2016–2026
90	Robin Uthappa	CSK/KKR/MI/PWI/RCB/RR	114	2008–2022

- Source: ESPNcricinfo

=== Most career catches as a wicket-keeper ===
As of 10 May 2026

Catches	Player	Teams	Innings	Seasons
154	MS Dhoni†	CSK/RPS	271	2008–2025
137	Dinesh Karthik	DD/GL/KKR/KXIP/MI/RCB	235	2008–2024
87	Wriddhiman Saha	CSK/GT/KKR/KXIP/SRH	149	2008–2024
87	Rishabh Pant†	DC/LSG	126	2016–2026
70	Quinton de Kock†	DC/KKR/LSG/MI/RCB/SRH	98	2013–2025

- Source: ESPNcricinfo

=== Most career stumpings ===
As of 10 May 2026

Stumpings	Player	Teams	Innings	Seasons
47	MS Dhoni†	CSK/RPS	269	2008–2025
37	Dinesh Karthik	DD/GL/KKR/KXIP/MI/RCB	235	2008–2024
32	Robin Uthappa	CSK/KKR/MI/PWI/RCB/RR	114	2008–2022
26	Wriddhiman Saha	CSK/GT/KKR/KXIP/SRH	149	2008–2024
24	Rishabh Pant†	DC/LSG	126	2016–2026

- Source: ESPNcricinfo

=== Most dismissals in an innings ===
As of August 2023 only Kumar Sangakkara has taken five wicket-keeping dismissals in an innings in the IPL. He did so for Deccan Chargers against Royal Challengers Bangalore in a 2011 match at Hyderabad. A number of wicket-keepers have taken four dismissals in an innings.

=== Most dismissals in a season ===
As of 24 May 2026

Dismissals	Player	Team	Season
24	Rishabh Pant†	DC	2019
23	Jos Buttler†	GT	2026
22	Quinton de Kock†	MI	2020
20	Jitesh Sharma	RCB	2025
19	Kumar Sangakkara	DEC	2011
19	Dhruv Jurel†	RR	2026
19	Quinton de Kock†	MI	2019

- Source: ESPNcricinfo

== Individual fielding records ==
=== Most career catches ===
As of 26 May 2026

Catches	Player	Teams	Innings	Seasons
126	Virat Kohli†	RCB	280	2008–2026
110	Ravindra Jadeja†	CSK/GL/KTK/RR	264	2008–2026
109	Suresh Raina	CSK/GL	204	2008–2021
103	Kieron Pollard	MI	189	2010–2022
102	Rohit Sharma†	DCH/MI	279	2008–2026

- Source: ESPNcricinfo

=== Most catches in an innings ===
As of May 2024, Mohammad Nabi and Daryl Mitchell are the only two fielders to hold five catches in an IPL match. Nabi did it for Sunrisers Hyderabad in a 2021 match against Mumbai Indians at Abu Dhabi, and Mitchell did it in 2024 for Chennai Super Kings against Sunrisers Hyderabad. A number of players have held four catches in an IPL match.

=== Most catches in a season ===
As of 3 June 2025

Catches	Player	Team	Season
19	AB de Villiers	RCB	2016
17	Ruturaj Gaikwad†	CSK	2023
17	Riyan Parag†	RR	2022
15	Kieron Pollard	MI	2017
14	David Miller†	KXIP	2014
14	Dwayne Bravo	CSK	2013

- Source: ESPNcricinfo

== Individual records (other) ==
=== Most matches played ===
As of 31 May 2026

Matches	Player	Team(s)	Period
283	Virat Kohli†	RCB	2008–2026
281	Rohit Sharma†	DEC/MI	2008–2026
278	MS Dhoni†	CSK/RPS	2008–2025
268	Ravindra Jadeja†	CSK/GL/KTK/RR	2008–2026
257	Dinesh Karthik	DD/GL/KKR/KXIP/MI/RCB	2008–2024

- Source: Cricinfo

=== Most matches played as captain ===
As of 20 May 2026

Matches	Player	Team(s)	Won	Lost	Tied	Drawn	No Result	Win%	Period
235	MS Dhoni†	CSK/RPS	136	97	0	0	2	57.87%	2008–2025
158	Rohit Sharma†	MI	87	67	4	0	0	55.06%	2013–2023
143	Virat Kohli†	RCB	66	70	3	0	4	46.15%	2011–2023
129	Gautam Gambhir	DD/KKR	71	57	2	0	0	55.03%	2009–2018
101	Shreyas Iyer†	DC/KKR/PBKS	55	41	2	0	3	54.45%	2018–2026

- Source: Cricinfo

== Miscellaneous records ==
As of 2024

- Most consecutive wins in a season: 9, Kolkata Knight Riders in 2014
- Most consecutive defeats in a season: 9, Pune Warriors India in 2012 and Delhi Capitals in 2014
- Most Player of the match awards: 25, AB de Villiers (2008–2021)

== Partnership records ==
=== Highest partnerships by wicket ===
As of 10 May 2024

Wicket	Runs	Batters		Team	Opposition	Venue	Date
1st wicket	210*	Quinton de Kock	KL Rahul	LSG	KKR	DY Patil Stadium, Navi Mumbai	18 May 2022
1st wicket	210	Sai Sudharsan	Shubman Gill	GT	CSK	Narendra Modi Stadium, Ahmedabad	10 May 2024
2nd wicket	229	Virat Kohli	AB de Villiers	RCB	GL	M. Chinnaswamy Stadium, Bengaluru	14 May 2016
3rd wicket	165	Robin Uthappa	Shivam Dube	CSK	RCB	DY Patil Stadium, Navi Mumbai	12 April 2022
4th wicket	144	Shimron Hetmyer	Gurkeerat Singh	RCB	SRH	M. Chinnaswamy Stadium, Bengaluru	4 May 2019
5th wicket	134*	Shakib Al Hasan	Yusuf Pathan	KKR	GL	Eden Gardens, Kolkata	8 May 2016
6th wicket	122*	Ambati Rayudu	Kieron Pollard	MI	RCB	M. Chinnaswamy Stadium, Bengaluru	14 May 2012
7th wicket	100	Jagadeesha Suchith	Harbhajan Singh	MI	KXIP	Wankhede Stadium, Mumbai	12 April 2015
8th wicket	73*	Ayush Badoni	Arshad Khan	LSG	DC	Ekana Cricket Stadium, Lucknow	12 April 2024
9th wicket	88*	Rashid Khan	Alzarri Joseph	GT	MI	Wankhede Stadium, Mumbai	12 May 2023
10th wicket	55*	Shikhar Dhawan	Mohit Rathee	PBKS	SRH	Rajiv Gandhi International Cricket Stadium, Hyderabad	9 April 2023

- Source: ESPNcricinfo

=== Highest partnerships by runs ===
As of 5 May 2026

Runs	Wicket	Batters		Team	Opposition	Venue	Date
229	2nd wicket	Virat Kohli	AB de Villiers	RCB	GL	M. Chinnaswamy Stadium, Bengaluru, India	14 May 2016
220	2nd wicket	KL Rahul	Nitish Rana	DC	PBKS	Arun Jaitley Cricket Stadium, New Delhi, India	25 April 2026
215*	2nd wicket	Virat Kohli	AB de Villiers	RCB	MI	Wankhede Stadium, Mumbai, India	10 May 2015
210*	1st wicket	Quinton de Kock	KL Rahul	LSG	KKR	DY Patil Stadium, Navi Mumbai, India	18 May 2022
210	1st wicket	Sai Sudharsan	Shubman Gill	GT	CSK	Narendra Modi Stadium, Ahmedabad, India	10 May 2024

- Source: ESPNcricinfo

== Awards ==
The Orange Cap is awarded to the top run-scorer in the IPL during a season. It is an ongoing competition with the leader wearing the cap throughout the tournament until the final game, with the eventual winner keeping the cap for the season. The Purple Cap is awarded to the top wicket-taker in the IPL during a season. It is an ongoing competition with the leader wearing the cap throughout the tournament until the final game, with the eventual winner keeping the cap for the season.

== See also ==
- List of Chennai Super Kings records
- List of Delhi Capitals records
- List of Kolkata Knight Riders records
- List of Mumbai Indians records
- List of Punjab Kings records
- List of Rajasthan Royals records
- List of Royal Challengers Bengaluru records
- List of Sunrisers Hyderabad records
