= List of Delhi Capitals records =

Delhi Capitals are a franchise cricket team that represents the city of Delhi in the Indian Premier League (IPL). Founded in 2008 as Delhi Daredevils (DD), the franchise is owned by the GMR Group and JSW Group. The team's home ground is Arun Jaitley Stadium which is in New Delhi.

== Listing notation ==
Team notation

- (200–3) indicates that a team scored 200 runs for three wickets and the innings was closed, either due to a successful run chase or if no playing time remained
- (200) indicates that a team scored 200 runs and was all out

Batting notation

- (100) indicates that a batsman scored 100 runs and was out
- (100*) indicates that a batsman scored 100 runs and was not out

Bowling notation

- (5–20) indicates that a bowler has captured 5 wickets while conceding 20 runs

Currently playing

- † indicates a current cricketer

Start Date

- indicates the date the match starts

== Team records ==
=== Team Performance ===
Year	Total	Wins	Losses	No result	Tied and won	Tied and lost	Win %	Position	Summary
2008	15	7	7	1	0	0	46.67%	4th	Semi-finalists
2009	15	10	5	0	0	0	66.67	3rd	Semi-finalists
2010	14	7	7	0	0	0	50.00	5th	Group-Stage
2011	14	4	9	1	0	0	23.07	10th	Group-Stage
2012	18	11	7	0	0	0	61.11	3rd	Playoffs
2013	16	3	13	0	0	1	18.75	9th	Group-Stage
2014	14	2	12	0	0	0	16.67	8th	Group-Stage
2015	14	5	9	0	0	0	35.71	7th	Group-Stage
2016	14	7	7	0	0	0	50.00	6th	Group-Stage
2017	14	6	8	0	0	0	42.86	6th	Group-Stage
2018	14	5	9	0	0	0	35.71	8th	Group-Stage
2019	16	10	6	0	1	0	64.29	3rd	Playoffs
2020	17	9	8	0	1	0	55.88	2nd	Runners up
2021	14	10	4	0	1	0	71.43	1st	Playoffs
2022	14	7	7	0	0	0	50.00	5th	Group-Stage
2023	14	5	9	0	0	0	35.71	9th	Group-Stage
Total	225	103	120	2	3	1	45.78	Runners Up	
Last Updated: 2 June 2022

=== Team wins, losses and draws ===
Opponent	Span	Matches	Won	Lost	Tied	No Result	Win %
CSK	2008-2026	33	12	21	0	0	36.36
GT	2022-2026	8	3	5	0	0	37.50
KKR	2008-2026	36	15	20	1	0	41.67
LSG	2022-2026	8	5	3	0	0	62.50
MI	2008-2026	38	17	21	0	1	44.73
PBKS	2008-2026	36	18	18	1	0	50.00
RR	2008-2026	31	16	15	0	0	51.61
RCB	2008-2026	35	13	20	1	0	37.14
SRH	2013-2026	27	12	14	1	0	44.44
DCH^{†}	2008-2012	11	7	4	0	0	63.63
GL^{†}	2016-2017	4	3	1	0	0	75.00
KTK^{†}	2011	2	1	1	0	0	50.00
PWI^{†}	2011-2013	6	3	2	0	0	60.00
RPS^{†}	2016-2017	4	2	2	0	1	50.00
Last updated: 12 April 2023 Note: Tie+W and Tie+L indicates matches tied and then won or lost by super over; The result percentage excludes no results and counts ties (irrespective of a tiebreaker) as half a win; The total matches does not include matches played for Champions League T20; †No longer exists.

== Result records ==
=== Greatest win margin (by runs) ===
Margin	Opposition	Venue	Date
97 runs	RPS	Maharashtra Cricket Association Stadium, Pune, India	11 April 2017
67 runs	RR	Arun Jaitley Stadium, Delhi, India	31 March 2010
59 runs	RCB	Dubai International Stadium, Dubai, UAE	5 October 2020
55 runs	KKR	Arun Jaitley Stadium, Delhi, India	27 April 2018
51 runs	PBKS	Arun Jaitley Stadium, Delhi, India	15 April 2017
Last Updated: 5 October 2020

=== Greatest win margin (by balls remaining) ===
Balls remaining	Margin	Opposition	Venue	Date
67	6 wickets	GT	Narendra Modi Stadium, Ahmedabad, India	17 April 2024
57	9 wickets	PBKS	Brabourne Stadium, Mumbai, India	20 April 2022
42	9 wickets	DC	Rajiv Gandhi International Cricket Stadium, Hyderabad, India	22 April 2008
40	8 wickets	CSK	Arun Jaitley Stadium, Delhi, India	12 April 2012
39	8 wickets	PBKS	Arun Jaitley Stadium, Delhi, India	15 April 2016
Last Updated: 17 April 2024		PBKS	Arun Jaitley Stadium, Delhi, India	

=== Greatest win margins (by wickets) ===
Margin	Opposition	Venue	Date
10 wickets	PBKS	Newlands, Cape Town, South Africa	19 April 2009
9 wickets	RR	Arun Jaitley Stadium, Delhi, India	19 April 2008
9 wickets	DC	Rajiv Gandhi International Cricket Stadium, Hyderabad, India	22 April 2008
9 wickets	KKR	Kingsmead, Durban, South Africa	5 May 2009
9 wickets	DC	Rajiv Gandhi International Cricket Stadium, Hyderabad, India	10 May 2012
9 wickets	MI	Arun Jaitley Stadium, Delhi, India	21 April 2013
9 wickets	PBKS	Arun Jaitley Stadium, Delhi, India	1 May 2015
Last Updated: 3 October 2020

=== Narrowest win margin (by runs) ===
Margin	Opposition	Venue	Date
1 run	RR	Arun Jaitley Stadium, Delhi, India	29 April 2012
4 runs	SRH	Dr. Y.S. Rajasekhara Reddy ACA-VDCA Cricket Stadium, Visakhapatnam, India	18 April 2015
4 runs	RR	Arun Jaitley Stadium, Delhi, India	2 May 2018
7 runs	RPS	Arun Jaitley Stadium, Delhi, India	12 May 2017
9 runs	CSK	Kingsmead, Durban, South Africa	23 April 2009
Last Updated: 3 October 2020

=== Narrowest win margin (by balls remaining) ===
Balls remaining	Margin	Opposition	Venue	Date
0 ball	6 wickets	SRH	Shaheed Veer Narayan Singh International Stadium, Raipur, India	20 May 2016
0 ball	7 wickets	MI	Wankhede Stadium, Mumbai, India	14 April 2018
1 ball	5 wickets	MI	Arun Jaitley Stadium, Delhi, India	24 May 2008
1 ball	5 wickets	PBKS	Punjab Cricket Association Stadium, Mohali, India	10 March 2010
1 ball	5 wickets	PBKS	Maharashtra Cricket Association Stadium, Pune, India	15 April 2015
1 ball	2 wickets	SRH	Dr. Y.S. Rajasekhara Reddy ACA-VDCA Cricket Stadium, Visakhapatnam, India	9 May 2019
1 ball	5 wickets	CSK	Sharjah Cricket Stadium, Sharjah, UAE	17 October 2020
Last Updated: 19 October 2020

=== Narrowest win margins (by wickets) ===
Margin	Opposition	Venue	Date
1 wicket	LSG	Dr. Y.S. Rajasekhara Reddy ACA-VDCA Cricket Stadium, Visakhapatnam, India	24 March 2025
2 wickets	GL	Green Park Stadium, Kanpur, India	10 May 2017
2 wickets	SRH	Dr. Y.S. Rajasekhara Reddy ACA-VDCA Cricket Stadium, Visakhapatnam, India	9 May 2019
3 wickets	PWI	DY Patil Stadium, Mumbai, India	17 April 2011
4 wickets	MI	Centurion Park, Centurion, South Africa	21 May 2009
4 wickets	DC	Rajiv Gandhi International Cricket Stadium, Hyderabad, India	5 May 2011
4 wickets	KKR	Dubai International Stadium, Dubai, UAE	9 April 2014
4 wickets	RCB	M. Chinnaswamy Stadium, Bangalore, India	7 April 2019
Last Updated: 3 October 2020

=== Tied Matches ===
Team 1	Team 2	Venue	Date
RCB	DD	M. Chinnaswamy Stadium, Bangalore, India	16 April 2013
KKR	DD	Arun Jaitley Stadium, Delhi, India	30 March 2019
PBKS	DD	Dubai International Stadium, Dubai, UAE	20 September 2020
SRH	DD	M. A. Chidambaram Stadium, Chennai, India	25 April 2021
Last Updated: 25 April 2021

== Team scoring records ==
=== Highest Totals ===
Score	Opposition	Venue	Date
264/2	PBKS	Arun Jaitley Stadium, Delhi	25 April 2026
257/4	MI	Arun Jaitley Stadium, Delhi	27 April 2024
231/4	PBKS	Arun Jaitley Stadium, Delhi	23 April 2011
228/4	KKR	Sharjah Cricket Stadium, Sharjah, UAE	3 October 2020
226/3	RR	Sawai Mansingh Stadium, Jaipur	1 May 2026
Last updated: 1 May 2026

=== Lowest Totals ===
Score	Opposition	Venue	Date
66	MI	Arun Jaitley Stadium, Delhi, India	6 May 2017
67	PBKS	Punjab Cricket Association Stadium, Mohali, India	30 April 2017
75	RCB	Arun Jaitley Cricket Stadium, Delhi	27 April 2026
80	SRH	Rajiv Gandhi International Cricket Stadium, Hyderabad, India	4 May 2013
83	CSK	Arun Jaitley Stadium, Delhi, India	18 April 2013
Last updated: 27 April 2026

=== Highest match aggregate ===
Aggregate	Team 1	Team 2	Venue	Date
529/6	DC (264/2)	PBKS (265/4)	Arun Jaitley Stadium, Delhi, India	25 April 2026
504/13	DC (257/4)	MI (247/9)	Arun Jaitley Stadium, Delhi, India	27 April 2024
465/17	SRH (266/7)	DC (199)	Arun Jaitley Stadium, Delhi, India	20 April 2024
444/12	DC (224/4)	GT (220/8)	Arun Jaitley Stadium, Delhi, India	24 April 2024
439/13	MI (234/5)	DC (205/8)	Wankhede Stadium, Mumbai, India	7 April 2024
Last updated: 25 April 2026

=== Lowest match aggregate ===
Aggregate	Team 1	Team 2	Venue	Date
135/10	DD (67)	PBKS (68/0)	Punjab Cricket Association Stadium, Mohali, India	30 April 2017
161/14	DD (80)	SRH (81/4)	Rajiv Gandhi International Cricket Stadium, Hyderabad, India	4 May 2013
162/7	PBKS (104/7)	DD (58/0)	Newlands, Cape Town, South Africa	19 April 2009
181/14	GT (89)	DC (92/4)	Narendra Modi Stadium, Ahmedabad, India	17 April 2024
185/13	MI (92)	DD (93/3)	Wankhede Stadium, Mumbai, India	16 April 2012
Last updated: 17 April 2024

== Individual Records (Batting) ==
=== Most runs ===
Rank	Runs	Player	Matches	Innings	Period
1	3,284	Rishabh Pant†	111	110	2016–2024
2	2,550	David Warner†	88	88	2009–2024
3	2,375	Shreyas Iyer	87	87	2015–2021
4	2,174	Virender Sehwag	79	79	2008–2013
5	2,066	Shikhar Dhawan	63	63	2008–2021
Last Updated: 27 April 2024

=== Highest individual score ===
Rank	Runs	Player	Opposition	Venue	Date
1	152*	KL Rahul	PBKS	Arun Jaitley Stadium, Delhi	25 April 2026
1	128*	Rishabh Pant	SRH	Arun Jaitley Stadium, Delhi	10 May 2018
2	119	Virender Sehwag	DCH	Rajiv Gandhi International Cricket Stadium, Hyderabad, India	5 May 2011
3	112*	KL Rahul	GT	Arun Jaitley Cricket Stadium, Delhi	18 May 2025
4	109*	David Warner	DCH	Rajiv Gandhi International Cricket Stadium, Hyderabad	10 May 2012
Last Updated: 25 April 2026

=== Highest career average ===
Rank	Average	Player	Innings	Not out	Runs	Period
1	54.00	KL Rahul	22	4	972	2025–2026
2	52.76	Tristan Stubbs	34	17	897	2024–2026
3	53.00	Vijay Shankar	11	7	212	2018-2018
4	44.13	JP Duminy	35	12	1,015	2014–2016
5	41.25	Sameer Rizvi	10	2	330	2025–2026
Qualification: 10 innings. Last Updated: 1 May 2026

=== Highest strike rates ===
Rank	Strike rate	Player	Runs	Balls Faced	Period
1	162.90	KL Rahul	896	550	2025-2026
2	161.85	Tristan Stubbs	874	540	2024-2026
3	160.32	Virender Sehwag	2,174	1,356	2008–2013
4	148.93	Rishabh Pant	3,284	2,205	2016–2024
5	147.46	Prithvi Shaw	1,892	1,283	2018–2024
Qualification= 500 balls faced. Last Updated: 25 April 2026

=== Most half-centuries ===
Rank	Half centuries	Player	Innings	Runs	Period
1	22	David Warner	89	2,551	2009–2024
2	18	Rishabh Pant	110	3,284	2016–2024
3	16	Shikhar Dhawan	63	2,066	2008-2021
3	16	Shreyas Iyer	87	2,375	2015-2021
4	15	Virender Sehwag	79	2,174	2008-2013
Last Updated: 11 April 2026

=== Most centuries ===
Rank	Centuries	Player	Innings	Period
1	2	KL Rahul	20	2025-2026
1	2	David Warner	55	2009–2013
1	2	Shikhar Dhawan	55	2008–2021
2	1	AB de Villiers	26	2008–2010
2	1	Virender Sehwag	79	2008–2013
2	1	Kevin Pietersen	19	2012–2014
2	1	Quinton de Kock	23	2014–2016
2	1	Sanju Samson	28	2016–2018
2	1	Rishabh Pant	76	2016–2021
Last Updated: 25 April 2026

=== Most Sixes ===
Rank	Sixes	Player	Innings	Period
1	154	Rishabh Pant	110	2016–2024
2	93	David Warner	89	2009–2024
4	88	Shreyas Iyer	87	2015–2021
5	85	Virender Sehwag	79	2008–2013
5	62	Axar Patel	76	2019-2026
Last Updated: 11 April 2026

=== Most Fours ===
Rank	Fours	Player	Innings	Period
1	296	Rishabh Pant	110	2016–2024
2	284	David Warner	89	2009–2024
3	266	Virender Sehwag	79	2008–2013
4	238	Prithvi Shaw	79	2018–2024
5	229	Shikhar Dhawan	63	2008–2021
Last Updated: 11 April 2026

=== Highest strike rates in an inning ===
Rank	Strike rate	Player	Runs	Balls Faced	Opposition	Venue	Date
1	422.22	Chris Morris	38*	9	RPS	Maharashtra Cricket Association Stadium, Pune	11 April 2017
2	371.42	Tristan Stubbs	26*	7	GT	Arun Jaitley Stadium, Delhi	24 April 2024
3	361.11	Jake Fraser-McGurk	65	18	SRH	Arun Jaitley Stadium, Delhi	20 April 2024
4	320.00	Abhishek Porel	32*	10	PBKS	Maharaja Yadavindra Singh International Cricket Stadium, Mullanpur	23 March 2024
5	311.11	Jake Fraser-McGurk	84	27	MI	Arun Jaitley Stadium, Delhi	27 April 2024
Qualification: Minimum 25 runs. Last Updated: 27 April 2024

=== Most sixes in an innings ===
Rank	Sixes	Player	Opposition	Venue	Date
1	10	Shreyas Iyer	KKR	Arun Jaitley Stadium, Delhi, India	27 April 2018
2	9	KL Rahul	PBKS	Arun Jaitley Stadium, Delhi, India	25 April 2025
2	9	Kevin Pietersen	DC	Arun Jaitley Stadium, Delhi, India	19 April 2012
2	9	Rishabh Pant	GL	Arun Jaitley Stadium, Delhi, India	4 May 2017
4	8	Chris Morris	GL	Arun Jaitley Stadium, Delhi, India	27 April 2016
4	8	Rishabh Pant	GT	Arun Jaitley Stadium, Delhi, India	24 April 2024
Last Updated: 25 April 2026

=== Most fours in an inning ===
Rank	Fours	Player	Opposition	Venue	Date
1	16	KL Rahul	PBKS	Arun Jaitley Cricket Stadium, Delhi	25 April 2026
2	15	Quinton de Kock	RCB	M. Chinnaswamy Stadium, Bangalore, India	17 April 2016
2	15	Shreyas Iyer	GL	Green Park Stadium, Kanpur, India	10 May 2017
2	15	Rishabh Pant	SRH	Arun Jaitley Stadium, Delhi, India	10 May 2018
5	14	Shikhar Dhawan	CSK	Sharjah Cricket Stadium, Sharjah, UAE	17 October 2020
5	14	KL Rahul	GT	Arun Jaitley Cricket Stadium, Delhi	18 May 2025
Last Updated: 25 April 2026

=== Most runs in a season ===
Rank	Runs	Player	Matches	Innings	Season
1	684	Rishabh Pant	14	14	2018
2	618	Shikhar Dhawan	17	17	2020
3	587	Shikhar Dhawan	16	16	2021
4	539	KL Rahul	13	13	2025
5	534	Gautam Gambhir	14	14	2008
Last Updated: 11 April 2026

=== Most ducks ===
Rank	Ducks	Player	Matches	Innings	Period
1	8	David Warner	89	88	2008-2024
2	7	Prithvi Shaw	79	79	2018-2024
3	6	Shikhar Dhawan	63	63	2008-2021
3	6	Virender Sehwag	79	79	2008-2013
5	5	Morné Morkel	37	15	2011-2013
5	5	Shahbaz Nadeem	61	19	2011-2018
5	5	Shreyas Iyer	87	87	2015-2021
Last Updated: 11 April 2026

== Individual Records (Bowling) ==
=== Most career wickets ===
Rank	Wickets	Player	Matches	Innings	Period
1	106	Amit Mishra	99	99	2008–2021
2	76	Kagiso Rabada	50	50	2017–2021
3	75	Axar Patel	103	101	2014–2026
4	65	Kuldeep Yadav	57	56	2022–2026
5	60	Anrich Nortje	46	46	2020–2024
Last Updated: 2 May 2026

=== Best figures in an innings ===
Rank	Figures	Player	Opposition	Venue	Date
1	5/17	Amit Mishra	DC	Arun Jaitley Stadium, Delhi, India	15 May 2008
2	5/35	Mitchell Starc	SRH	ACA–VDCA Cricket Stadium, Visakhapatnam	30 March 2025
3	4/11	Amit Mishra	PBKS	Arun Jaitley Stadium, Delhi, India	15 April 2016
4	4/14	Kuldeep Yadav	KKR	Wankhede Stadium, Mumbai	28 April 2022
5	4/15	Rajat Bhatia	DC	Kingsmead, Durban, South Africa	13 May 2009
Last Updated: 21 April 2026

=== Best career average ===
Rank	Average	Player	Wickets	Runs	Balls	Period
1	19.25	Farveez Maharoof	27	520	420	2008–2010
2	19.30	Kagiso Rabada	69	1,332	960	2017–2021
3	21.05	Ashish Nehra	36	758	606	2009–2013
4	21.48	Imran Tahir	29	623	434	2014–2016
5	23.10	Nathan Coulter-Nile	20	462	369	2014–2016
Qualification: 250 balls. Last Updated: 2 May 2021

=== Best career economy rate ===
Rank	Economy rate	Player	Wickets	Runs	Balls	Period
1	6.61	Glenn McGrath	12	357	324	2008-2008
2	7.12	Dirk Nannes	22	596	502	2009–2010
3	7.32	Axar Patel	75	2,520	2,064	2019–2026
4	7.35	Amit Mishra	106	2,507	2,046	2008–2021
5	7.36	Shahbaz Nadeem	40	1,480	1,205	2011–2018
Qualification: 250 balls. Last Updated: 2 May 2026

=== Best career strike rate ===
Rank	Strike rate	Player	Wickets	Runs	Balls	Period
1	13.9	Kagiso Rabada	69	1,332	960	2017–2021
2	14.9	Imran Tahir	29	623	434	2014–2016
3	15.5	Farveez Maharoof	27	520	420	2008–2010
4	15.7	Yo Mahesh	18	418	283	2008–2010
5	16.6	Anrich Nortje	22	512	366	2020-2020
Qualification: 250 balls. Last Updated: 2 May 2021

=== Most four-wickets (& over) hauls in an innings ===
Rank	Four-wicket hauls	Player	Matches	Balls	Wickets	Period
1	4	Kagiso Rabada	42	960	69	2018–2021
2	3	Amit Mishra	99	2,046	106	2008–2021
3	1	10 Players.				
Last Updated: 2 May 2021

=== Best economy rates in an inning ===
Rank	Economy	Player	Overs	Runs	Wickets	Opposition	Venue	Date
1	1.50	Ashish Nehra	4	6	1	PBKS	Mangaung Oval, Bloemfontein, South Africa	15 May 2009
1	1.50	Jaydev Unadkat	2	3	1	PBKS	Punjab Cricket Association Stadium, Mohali, India	25 May 2014
3	2.25	Zaheer Khan	4	9	2	CSK	Shaheed Veer Narayan Singh International Stadium, Raipur, India	12 May 2015
4	2.66	Ashish Nehra	3	8	1	RR	Mangaung Oval, Bloemfontein, South Africa	17 May 2009
5	2.75	Farveez Maharoof	4	11	2	RR	Arun Jaitley Stadium, Delhi, India	19 April 2008
5	2.75	Morne Morkel	4	11	2	RR	Sawai Mansingh Stadium, Jaipur, India	12 April 2011
5	2.75	Umesh Yadav	4	11	2	MI	Wankhede Stadium, Mumbai, India	16 April 2012
Qualification: 12 balls bowled. Last Updated: 3 October 2020

=== Best strike rates in an inning ===
Rank	Strike rate	Player	Balls	Runs	Wickets	Opposition	Venue	Date
1	3.0	Ravichandran Ashwin	6	2	2	PBKS	Dubai International Stadium, Dubai, UAE	20 September 2020
2	4.0	Rajat Bhatia	16	15	4	DC	Kingsmead, Durban, South Africa	13 May 2009
3	4.5	JP Duminy	18	17	4	SRH	Dr. Y.S. Rajasekhara Reddy ACA-VDCA Cricket Stadium, Visakhapatnam, India	18 April 2015
3	4.5	Amit Mishra	18	11	4	PBKS	Arun Jaitley Stadium, Delhi, India	15 April 2016
5	4.8	Amit Mishra	24	17	5	DC	Arun Jaitley Stadium, Delhi, India	15 May 2008
Qualification: Minimum 2 wickets. Last Updated: 3 October 2020.

=== Most runs conceded in a match ===
Rank	Figures	Player	Overs	Opposition	Venue	Date
1	0/65	Umesh Yadav	4	RCB	Arun Jaitley Stadium, Delhi, India	10 May 2013
2	2/63	Varun Aaron	4	CSK	M. A. Chidambaram Stadium, Chennai, India	25 May 2012
3	0/59	Imran Tahir	4	MI	Dr. Y.S. Rajasekhara Reddy ACA-VDCA Cricket Stadium, Visakhapatnam, India	15 May 2016
3	0/59	Kagiso Rabada	4	SRH	Arun Jaitley Stadium, Delhi, India	2 May 2017
3	0/59	Pat Cummins	4	MI	Arun Jaitley Stadium, Delhi, India	6 May 2017
Last updated:3 October 2020

=== Most wickets in a season ===
Rank	Wickets	Player	Innings	Season
1	30	Kagiso Rabada	17	2020
2	25	Kagiso Rabada	12	2019
2	25	Morne Morkel	16	2012
4	24	Avesh Khan	16	2021
5	22	Anrich Nortje	16	2020
Last Updated: 13 November 2021

=== Hat-trick ===
S. No	Bowler	Against	Wickets	Venue	Date	Ref.
1	Amit Mishra	DC	Ravi Teja (c Shoaib Malik); Pragyan Ojha (c Tillakaratne Dilshan); RP Singh (st Dinesh Karthik)	Arun Jaitley Stadium, Delhi, India	15 May 2008	
Last Updated: 3 October 2020

== Individual Records (Wicket-keeping) ==
=== Most career dismissals ===
Rank	Dismissals	Player	Matches	Innings	Period
1	93	Rishabh Pant	108	98	2016–2024
2	45	Dinesh Karthik	56	55	2008–2014
3	25	Naman Ojha	35	33	2011–2018
4	14	Kedar Jadhav	41	21	2010–2015
5	5	Phil Salt	9	9	2023-2023
Last updated: 27 April 2024

=== Most career catches ===
Rank	Catches	Player	Matches	Innings	Period
1	72	Rishabh Pant	108	98	2016–2024
2	30	Dinesh Karthik	56	55	2008–2014
3	23	Naman Ojha	35	33	2011–2018
4	10	Kedar Jadhav	41	21	2010–2015
5	5	Phil Salt	9	9	2023-2023
Last updated: 27 April 2024

=== Most career stumpings ===
Rank	Stumpings	Player	Matches	Innings	Period
1	21	Rishabh Pant	108	98	2016–2024
2	15	Dinesh Karthik	56	55	2008–2014
3	4	Kedar Jadhav	41	21	2010–2015
4	2	Naman Ojha	35	33	2011–2018
4	2	Quinton de Kock	23	17	2014–2016
Last updated: 27 April 2024

=== Most dismissals in an innings ===
Rank	Dismissals	Player	Opposition	Venue	Date
1	4	Dinesh Karthik	RR	Mangaung Oval, Bloemfontein, India	17 May 2009
3	3	Dinesh Karthik	PBKS	Punjab Cricket Association Stadium, Mohali, India	27 April 2008
3	3	Dinesh Karthik	PBKS	Punjab Cricket Association Stadium, Mohali, India	10 March 2010
3	3	Dinesh Karthik	RR	Arun Jaitley Stadium, Delhi, India	31 March 2010
3	3	Naman Ojha	PBKS	Arun Jaitley Stadium, Delhi, India	15 May 2012
3	3	Rishabh Pant	RPS	Maharashtra Cricket Association Stadium, Pune, India	11 April 2017
3	3	Rishabh Pant	CSK	Arun Jaitley Stadium, Delhi, India	26 March 2019
3	3	Rishabh Pant	RCB	M. Chinnaswamy Stadium, Bengaluru, India	7 April 2019
3	3	Rishabh Pant	RR	Arun Jaitley Stadium, Delhi, India	4 May 2019
3	3	Rishabh Pant	MI	M. A. Chidambaram Stadium, Chennai, India	20 April 2021
Last Updated: 20 April 2021

=== Most dismissals in a series ===
Rank	Dismissals	Player	Matches	Innings	Series
1	24	Rishabh Pant	16	16	2019 Indian Premier League
2	17	Dinesh Karthik	15	15	2009 Indian Premier League
3	16	Naman Ojha	18	18	2012 Indian Premier League
4	13	Rishabh Pant	14	14	2020 Indian Premier League
5	12	Dinesh Karthik	14	14	2010 Indian Premier League
Last Updated: 13 November 2020

== Individual Records (Fielding) ==
=== Most career catches ===
Rank	Catches	Player	Matches	Innings	Period
1	43	Axar Patel	78	78	2019–2024
2	40	David Warner	88	87	2009–2024
3	34	Shreyas Iyer	87	87	2015–2021
4	29	Virender Sehwag	79	79	2008–2013
5	27	Shikhar Dhawan	63	63	2008–2021
Last Updated: 27 April 2024

=== Most catches in an innings ===
Rank	Dismissals	Player	Opposition	Venue	Date
1	4	David Warner	RR	Arun Jaitley Stadium, Delhi, India	31 March 2010
1	4	Rahul Tewatia	MI	Wankhede Stadium, Mumbai, India	24 March 2019
3	3	AB de Villiers	CSK	Wanderers Stadium, Johannesburg, India	2 May 2009
3	3	David Warner	RCB	Arun Jaitley Stadium, Delhi, India	4 April 2010
3	3	Virender Sehwag	PBKS	Arun Jaitley Stadium, Delhi, India	23 April 2011
3	3	Irfan Pathan	PBKS	Himachal Pradesh Cricket Association Stadium, Pune, India	19 May 2012
3	3	Johan Botha	PBKS	Arun Jaitley Stadium, Delhi, India	23 April 2013
3	3	Virender Sehwag	PWI	Maharashtra Cricket Association Stadium, Pune, India	19 May 2013
3	3	JP Duminy	CSK	Shaheed Veer Narayan Singh International Stadium, Raipur, India	12 May 2015
3	3	Trent Boult	MI	Arun Jaitley Stadium, Delhi, India	20 May 2018
3	3	Kagiso Rabada	SRH	Rajiv Gandhi International Cricket Stadium, Hyderabad, India	14 April 2019
3	3	Shimron Hetmyer	RR	Sharjah Cricket Stadium, Sharjah, UAE	9 October 2020
3	3	Shikhar Dhawan	CSK	Wankhede Stadium, Mumbai, India	10 April 2021
3	3	Shikhar Dhawan	RR	Wankhede Stadium, Mumbai, India	15 April 2021
Last Updated: 15 April 2021

=== Most catches in a series ===
Rank	Catches	Player	Matches	Innings	Series
1	13	AB de Villiers	15	15	2009 Indian Premier League
2	9	Virender Sehwag	11	11	2011 Indian Premier League
2	9	Trent Boult	14	14	2018 Indian Premier League
2	9	Axar Patel	14	14	2019 Indian Premier League
5	8	Shikhar Dhawan	14	14	2008 Indian Premier League
5	8	David Warner	11	11	2010 Indian Premier League
5	8	Irfan Pathan	17	17	2012 Indian Premier League
5	8	Murali Vijay	11	11	2014 Indian Premier League
5	8	JP Duminy	14	14	2015 Indian Premier League
5	8	Chris Morris	12	12	2016 Indian Premier League
5	8	Shreyas Iyer	16	16	2019 Indian Premier League
5	8	Kagiso Rabada	17	17	2020 Indian Premier League
5	8	Shikhar Dhawan	8	8	2021 Indian Premier League
Last Updated: 2 May 2021

== Individual Records (Other) ==
=== Most matches ===
Rank	Matches	Player	Period
1	111	Rishabh Pant	2016–2024
2	104	Axar Patel	2019–2026
3	99	Amit Mishra	2008–2021
4	89	David Warner	2009–2024
5	87	Shreyas Iyer	2015–2021
Last Updated: 21 April 2026

=== Most matches as captain ===
Rank	Matches	Player	Won	Lost	Tied	Win %	Period
1	52	Virender Sehwag	28	24	0	53.84	2008–2012
2	41	Shreyas Iyer	21	18	2	53.65	2018–2020
3	40	Rishabh Pant†	21	18	1	53.75	2021–2024
4	23	Zaheer Khan	10	13	0	43.47	2016–2017
5	22	Axar Patel	9	11	1	40.90	2024–2026
Last Updated: 1 May 2026

== Partnership Record ==
=== Highest partnerships by wicket ===
Wicket	Runs	First batsman	Second batsman	Opposition	Venue	Date
1st Wicket	151	Mahela Jayawardene	Virender Sehwag	MI	Arun Jaitley Stadium, Delhi	21 April 2013
2nd Wicket	220	KL Rahul	Nitish Rana	PBKS	Arun Jaitley Stadium, Delhi	25 April 2026
3rd Wicket	134	Quinton de Kock	Karun Nair	RCB	M. Chinnaswamy Stadium, Bangalore, India	17 April 2016
4th Wicket	128	David Warner	Paul Collingwood	KKR	Arun Jaitley Stadium, Delhi, India	29 March 2010
5th Wicket	110*	JP Duminy	Ross Taylor	RCB	Sharjah Cricket Stadium, Sharjah, UAE	17 April 2014
6th Wicket	71	Marcus Stoinis	Axar Patel	MI	Dubai International Stadium, Dubai, UAE	5 November 2020
7th Wicket	91	Kagiso Rabada	Chris Morris	MI	Wankhede Stadium, Mumbai, India	22 April 2017
8th Wicket	48*	Paul Collingwood	Ashish Nehra	DC	Arun Jaitley Stadium, Delhi, India	18 April 2010
9th Wicket	29	Manoj Tiwari	Rahul Shukla	RR	Sardar Patel Stadium, Ahmedabad, India	15 May 2014
10th Wicket	19*	Manoj Tiwari	Siddarth Kaul	RR	Sardar Patel Stadium, Ahmedabad, India	15 May 2014
Last Updated: 25 April 2026

=== Highest partnerships by runs ===
Wicket	runs	First batsman	Second batsman	Opposition	Venue	Date
2nd Wicket	220	KL Rahul	Nitish Rana	PBKS	Arun Jaitley Cricket Stadium, Delhi	25 April 2026
2nd Wicket	189*	David Warner	Naman Ojha	DC	Rajiv Gandhi International Cricket Stadium, Hyderabad, India	10 May 2012
2nd Wicket	154	Shreyas Iyer	JP Duminy	MI	Arun Jaitley Stadium, Delhi, India	23 April 2015
1st Wicket	151	Mahela Jayawardene	Virender Sehwag	MI	Arun Jaitley Stadium, Delhi, India	21 April 2013
1st Wicket	146	David Warner	Virender Sehwag	KXIP	Arun Jaitley Stadium, Delhi, India	23 April 2011
Last Updated: 25 April 2026
