= List of Royal Challengers Bengaluru records =

Royal Challengers Bengaluru records in IPL

Royal Challengers Bengaluru (often abbreviated as RCB) are a franchise based in Bengaluru, Karnataka, that plays in the Indian Premier League (IPL). One of the original ten teams in the IPL, the team has made five final appearances in the IPL, winning two. (in 2009 to the Deccan Chargers, in 2011 to the Chennai Super Kings, in 2016 to the Sunrisers Hyderabad. The team also finished runners-up in the 2011 CLT20, losing the final against the Mumbai Indians. They won the IPL in 2025 after defeating Punjab Kings and again in 2026 after defeating Gujarat Titans.

The home ground of the Royal Challengers is the M. Chinnaswamy Stadium in Bangalore. The team is currently captained by Rajat Patidar and coached by Andy Flower.

== Listing criteria ==
In general the top five are listed in each category (except when there is a tie for the last place among the five, when all the tied record holders are noted).

== Listing notation ==
Team notation

- (200–3) indicates that a team scored 200 runs for three wickets and the innings was closed, either due to a successful run chase or if no playing time remained
- (200) indicates that a team scored 200 runs and was all out

Batting notation

- (100) indicates that a batsman scored 100 runs and was out
- (100*) indicates that a batsman scored 100 runs and was not out

Bowling notation

- (5–20) indicates that a bowler has captured 5 wickets while conceding 20 runs

Currently playing

- † indicates a current cricketer

Start Date

- indicates the date the match starts

== Team records ==
=== Overall record ===
Matches	Won	Lost	Tied	Tie+Win	Tie+Loss	NR	Win %
290	143	137	3	2	1	7	49.31
Last Updated: 3 June 2026

=== Team performance ===
Year	Total	Wins	Losses	No result	Tied and won	Tied and lost	Win %	Position	Summary
2008	14	4	10	0	0	0	29.90	7th	League Stage
2009	16	9	7	0	0	0	56.25	2nd	Runners-up
2010	16	8	8	0	0	0	50.00	3rd	Play-offs
2011	17	10	6	1	0	0	58.82	2nd	Runners-up
2012	16	8	7	1	0	0	53.34	5th	League Stage
2013	16	9	7	0	1	1	56.25	5th	League Stage
2014	14	5	9	0	0	0	35.71	7th	League Stage
2015	16	8	6	2	0	0	57.14	3rd	Play-offs
2016	16	9	7	0	0	0	56.25	2nd	Runners-up
2017	14	3	10	1	0	0	23.07	8th	League Stage
2018	14	6	8	0	0	0	42.86	6th	League Stage
2019	14	5	8	1	0	0	38.46	8th	League Stage
2020	15	7	8	0	1	0	46.6	4th	Play-offs
2021	15	9	6	0	0	0	60.00	3rd	Play-offs
2022	16	9	7	0	0	0	56.25	4th	Play-offs
2023	14	7	7	0	0	0	50.00	6th	League Stage
2024	15	7	8	0	0	0	46.70	4th	Play-offs
2025	16	11	4	1	0	0	68.75	2nd	Winners
2026	16	11	5	0	0	0	68.75	1st	Winners
Total	290	145	138	7	2	1	50.00	2 Time Champions	
Last Updated: 3 June 2026

=== Team wins, losses and draws ===
Opponent	Span	Matches	Won	Lost	Tied and won	Tied and lost	No Result	Win %
CSK	2008-2026	36	14	21	0	0	1	38.89
DC	2008-2026	35	20	13	1	0	1	60.00
GT	2022-2026	10	6	4	0	0	0	60.00
KKR	2008-2026	37	16	20	0	0	1	43.24
LSG	2022-2026	8	5	3	0	0	0	62.50
MI	2008-2026	36	16	19	1	0	0	44.44
PBKS	2008-2026	38	20	18	0	0	0	52.63
RR	2008-2026	35	17	15	0	0	3	48.57
SRH	2013-2026	28	12	14	0	1	1	42.86
DCH^{†}	2008-2012	11	5	6	0	0	0	45.45
KTK^{†}	2011	2	2	0	0	0	0	100.00
PWI^{†}	2011-2013	5	5	0	0	0	0	100.00
GL^{†}	2016-2017	5	3	2	0	0	0	60.00
RPS^{†}	2016-2017	4	2	2	0	0	0	50.00
Last updated: 3 June 2026

Note:

- Tie+W and Tie+L indicates matches tied and then won or lost by super over

=== Result records ===
==== Greatest win margin (by runs) ====
Margin	Opponent	Venue	Date
144 Runs	Gujarat Lions	M. Chinnaswamy Stadium, Bengaluru, India	14 May 2016
138 Runs	Punjab Kings	M. Chinnaswamy Stadium, Bengaluru, India	6 May 2015
130 Runs	Pune Warriors India	M. Chinnaswamy Stadium, Bengaluru, India	23 April 2013
112 runs	Rajasthan Royals	Sawai Mansingh Stadium, Jaipur, India	14 May 2023
92 runs	Gujarat Titans	Himachal Pradesh Cricket Association Stadium, Dharamshala, India	26 May 2026
Last Updated: 27 May 2026

=== Greatest win margin (by balls remaining) ===
Margin	Opponent	Venue	Date
81	Delhi Capitals	Arun Jaitley Cricket Stadium, Delhi, India	27 April 2026
71	Punjab Kings	Holkar Stadium, Indore, India	14 May 2018
60	Punjab Kings	Maharaja Yadavindra Singh International Cricket Stadium, New Chandigarh, India	29 May 2025
57	Delhi Daredevils	Arun Jaitley Stadium, Delhi, India	26 April 2015
56	Rajasthan Royals	M. Chinnaswamy Stadium, Bengaluru, India	18 March 2010
41	Kochi Tuskers Kerala	M. Chinnaswamy Stadium, Bengaluru, India	8 May 2011
Last Updated: 3 June 2025

=== Greatest win (by wickets) ===
Margin	Opponent	Venue	Date
10 wickets	RR	M. Chinnaswamy Stadium, Bengaluru	18 March 2010
10 wickets	DC	Arun Jaitley Stadium, Delhi	26 April 2015
10 wickets	PBKS	Holkar Stadium, Indore	14 May 2018
10 wickets	RR	Wankhede Stadium, Mumbai	22 April 2021
9 wickets	Mumbai Indians	New Wanderers Stadium, Johannesburg, South Africa	3 May 2009
9 wickets	Deccan Chargers	DY Patil Stadium, Mumbai, India	24 April 2010
9 wickets	Kolkata Knight Riders	Eden Gardens, Kolkata, India	22 April 2011
9 wickets	Kochi Tuskers Kerala	M. Chinnaswamy Stadium, Bengaluru, India	8 May 2011
9 wickets	Rajasthan Royals	Sawai Mansingh Stadium, Jaipur, India	11 May 2011
9 wickets	Mumbai Indians	Wankhede Stadium, Mumbai, India	9 May 2012
9 wickets	Rajasthan Royals	Sardar Patel Stadium, Ahmedabad, India	24 April 2015
9 wickets	Delhi Capitals	Arun Jaitley Stadium, Delhi, India	27 April 2026
9 wickets	Kolkata Knight Riders	Eden Gardens, Kolkata, India	16 May 2016
9 wickets	Gujarat Titans	Narendra Modi Stadium, Ahmedabad, India	28 April 2024
Last Updated: 22 April 2025

=== Narrowest win margin (by runs) ===
Margin	Opponent	Venue	Date
1 run	Punjab Kings	Punjab Cricket Association Stadium, Mohali, India	9 May 2016
1 run	Chennai Super Kings	M. Chinnaswamy Stadium, Bengaluru, India	21 April 2019
1 run	Delhi Capitals	Narendra Modi Stadium, Ahmedabad, India	27 April 2021
2 runs	Mumbai Indians	M. Chinnaswamy Stadium, Bengaluru, India	4 April 2013
2 runs	Chennai Super Kings	M. Chinnaswamy Stadium, Bengaluru, India	3 May 2025
3 runs	Deccan Chargers	M. Chinnaswamy Stadium, Bengaluru, India	3 May 2008
Last Updated: 4 May 2025

=== Narrowest win margin (by balls remaining) ===
Margin	Opponent	Venue	Date
0 ball	Pune Warriors India	M. Chinnaswamy Stadium, Bengaluru, India	17 April 2012
0 ball	Mumbai Indians	M. A. Chidambaram Stadium, Chennai, India	9 April 2021
0 ball	Delhi Capitals	Dubai International Cricket Stadium, Dubai, UAE	8 October 2021
0 ball	Mumbai Indians	Shaheed Veer Narayan Singh International Cricket Stadium, Raipur, India	11 May 2026
1 ball	Kolkata Knight Riders	Kingsmead, Durban, South Africa	29 April 2009
1 ball	Sunrisers Hyderabad	M. Chinnaswamy Stadium, Bengaluru, India	4 May 2014
1 ball	Chennai Super Kings	JSCA International Stadium Complex, Ranchi, India	18 May 2014
1 ball	Sunrisers Hyderabad	Rajiv Gandhi International Cricket Stadium, Hyderabad, India	15 May 2015
Last Updated: 11 October 2021

=== Narrowest win margins (by wickets) ===
Margin	Opponent	Venue	Date
2 wickets	Chennai Super Kings	Kingsmead, Durban, South Africa	14 May 2009
2 wickets	Mumbai Indians	M. A. Chidambaram Stadium, Chennai, India	9 April 2021
3 wickets	Delhi Capitals	Arun Jaitley Stadium, Delhi, India	26 April 2011
3 wickets	Kolkata Knight Riders	Eden Gardens, Kolkata, India	11 April 2015
3 wickets	Kolkata Knight Riders	DY Patil Stadium, Navi Mumbai, India	30 March 2022
Last Updated: 30 March 2022

=== Tied Matches ===
Opposition	Result	Venue	Date
SRH	SRH	Rajiv Gandhi International Stadium, Hyderabad, India	7 April 2013
DD	RCB	M Chinnaswamy Stadium, Bengaluru, India	16 April 2013
MI	RCB	Dubai International Cricket Stadium, Dubai, UAE	28 September 2020
Last Updated: 11 April 2023

=== Greatest loss margin (by runs) ===
Margin	Opposition	Venue	Date
140 runs	KKR	M. Chinnaswamy Stadium, Bengaluru, India	18 April 2008
118 runs	SRH	Rajiv Gandhi International Cricket Stadium, Hyderabad, India	31 March 2019
111 runs	PBKS	Himachal Pradesh Cricket Association Stadium, Dharamshala, India	17 May 2011
97 runs	PBKS	Dubai International Stadium, Dubai, UAE	24 September 2020
92 runs	CSK	St George's Park Cricket Ground, Port Elizabeth, South Africa	20 April 2009
Last Updated: 20 October 2020

=== Greatest loss margin (by balls remaining) ===
Balls remaining	Margin	Opposition	Venue	Date
72	9 wickets	SRH	Brabourne Stadium, Mumbai, India	23 April 2022
60	9 wickets	KKR	Sheikh Zayed Stadium, Abu Dhabi, UAE	20 September 2021
42	6 wickets	RR	Sheikh Zayed Stadium, Abu Dhabi, UAE	26 April 2014
37	7 wickets	GL	M. Chinnaswamy Stadium, Bengaluru, India	27 April 2017
35	5 wickets	SRH	Sharjah Cricket Stadium, Sharjah, UAE	31 October 2020
Last Updated: 23 April 2022

=== Greatest loss margins (by wickets) ===
Margin	Opposition	Venue	Date
9 wickets	PBKS	Punjab Cricket Association Stadium, Mohali, India	12 May 2008
9 wickets	MI	M. Chinnaswamy Stadium, Bengaluru, India	28 May 2008
9 wickets	MI	M. Chinnaswamy Stadium, Bengaluru, India	12 April 2011
9 wickets	KKR	Sheikh Zayed Stadium, Abu Dhabi, UAE	20 September 2021
8 wickets	CSK	M. Chinnaswamy Stadium, Bengaluru, India	24 May 2014
8 wickets	SRH	M. Chinnaswamy Stadium, Bengaluru, India	13 April 2015
8 wickets	PBKS	Holkar Stadium, Indore, India	10 April 2017
8 wickets	PBKS	Sharjah Cricket Stadium, Sharjah, UAE	15 October 2020
8 wickets	CSK	Dubai International Stadium, Dubai, UAE	25 October 2020
Last Updated: 11 October 2021

=== Narrowest loss margin (by runs) ===
Margin	Opposition	Venue	Date
1 run	KKR	Eden Gardens, Kolkata, India	21 April 2024
2 runs	KKR	Sharjah Cricket Stadium, Sharjah, UAE	24 April 2014
4 runs	SRH	Sheikh Zayed Stadium, Abu Dhabi, UAE	6 October 2021
5 runs	KKR	Eden Gardens, Kolkata, India	8 May 2008
5 runs	SRH	Rajiv Gandhi International Cricket Stadium, Hyderabad, India	7 May 2018
6 runs	DC	New Wanderers Stadium, Johannesburg, South Africa	24 May 2009
6 runs	MI	M. Chinnaswamy Stadium, Bengaluru, India	28 March 2019
Last Updated: 26 April 2024

=== Narrowest loss margin (by balls remaining) ===
Balls remaining	Margin	Opposition	Venue	Date
0 ball	5 wickets	CSK	M. A. Chidambaram Stadium, Chennai, India	12 April 2012
0 ball	8 wickets	PBKS	Sharjah Cricket Stadium, Sharjah, UAE	15 October 2020
0 ball	1 wicket	LSG	M. Chinnaswamy Stadium, Bengaluru, India	10 April 2023
1 ball	4 wickets	PBKS	M. Chinnaswamy Stadium, Bengaluru, India	2 May 2012
1 ball	4 wickets	CSK	M. A. Chidambaram Stadium, Chennai, India	13 April 2013
1 ball	4 wickets	RR	Sawai Mansingh Stadium, Jaipur, India	29 April 2013
1 ball	3 wickets	CSK	JSCA International Stadium Complex, Ranchi, India	22 May 2015
1 ball	5 wickets	MI	Wankhede stadium, Mumbai, India	1 May 2017
1 ball	7 wickets	RR	Sawai Mansingh Stadium, Jaipur, India	2 April 2019
Last Updated: 10 April 2023

=== Narrowest loss margins (by wickets) ===
Margin	Opposition	Venue	Date
1 wicket	LSG	M. Chinnaswamy Stadium, Bengaluru, India	10 April 2023
3 wickets	CSK	JSCA International Stadium Complex, Ranchi, India	22 May 2015
4 wickets	PBKS	M. Chinnaswamy Stadium, Bengaluru, India	2 May 2012
4 wickets	CSK	M. A. Chidambaram Stadium, Chennai, India	13 April 2013
4 wickets	RR	Sawai Mansingh Stadium, Jaipur, India	29 April 2013
4 wickets	MI	M. Chinnaswamy Stadium, Bengaluru, India	14 April 2017
4 wickets	KKR	Eden Gardens, Kolkata, India	8 April 2018
4 wickets	DD	M. Chinnaswamy Stadium, Bengaluru, India	7 April 2019
4 wickets	KKR	Sharjah Cricket Stadium, Sharjah, UAE	11 October 2021
Last Updated: 11 April 2023

== Team scoring records ==
=== Highest Totals ===
Score	Opposition	Venue	Date
263/5	PWI	M. Chinnaswamy Stadium, Bengaluru, India	23 April 2013
262/7	SRH	M. Chinnaswamy Stadium, Bengaluru, India	15 April 2024
254/5	GT	Himachal Pradesh Cricket Association Stadium, Dharamshala, India	26 May 2026
250/3	CSK	M. Chinnaswamy Stadium, Bengaluru, India	5 April 2026
248/3	GL	M. Chinnaswamy Stadium, Bengaluru, India	14 May 2016
Last updated: 26 May 2026

=== Lowest Totals ===
Score	Opposition	Venue	Date
49	KKR	Eden Gardens, Kolkata, India	23 April 2017
68	SRH	Brabourne Stadium, Mumbai, India	23 April 2022
70	RR	Sheikh Zayed Stadium, Abu Dhabi, UAE	26 April 2014
70	CSK	M. A. Chidambaram Stadium, Chennai, India	23 March 2019
82	KKR	M. Chinnaswamy Stadium, Bengaluru, India	18 April 2008
Last updated: 22 April 2025

=== Highest Totals Conceded ===
Score	Opposition	Venue	Date
287/3	SRH	M. Chinnaswamy Stadium, Bengaluru, India	15 April 2024
232/2	PBKS	Himachal Pradesh Cricket Association Stadium, Dharamshala, India	17 May 2011
231/2	SRH	Rajiv Gandhi International Cricket Stadium, Hyderabad, India	31 March 2019
226/6	CSK	M. Chinnaswamy Stadium, Bengaluru, India	17 April 2023
222/6	KKR	Eden Gardens, Kolkata, India	21 April 2024
Last updated: 21 April 2024

=== Lowest Totals Conceded ===
Score	Opposition	Venue	Date
58	RR	Newlands, Cape Town	18 April 2009
59	RR	Sawai Mansingh Indoor Stadium, Jaipur	14 May 2023
75	DC	Arun Jaitley Cricket Stadium, Delhi	27 April 2026
82	DCH	DY Patil Stadium, Mumbai, India	24 April 2010
84/8	KKR	Sheikh Zayed Stadium, Abu Dhabi, UAE	21 October 2020
Last updated: 20 October 2020

=== Highest match aggregate ===
Aggregate	Team 1	Team 2	Venue	Date
549/10	SRH (287/3)	RCB (262/7)	M. Chinnaswamy Stadium, Bengaluru, India	15 April 2024
462/9	RCB (240/4)	MI (222/5)	Wankhede Stadium, Mumbai, India	12 April 2026
457/7	LSG (227/3)	RCB (230/4)	Ekana Cricket Stadium, Lucknow, India	27 May 2025
457/13	RCB (250/3)	CSK (207)	M. Chinnaswamy Stadium, Bengaluru, India	5 April 2026
455/8	SRH (255/4)	RCB (200/4)	Rajiv Gandhi International Cricket Stadium, Hyderabad, India	22 May 2026
Last updated: 27 May 2026

=== Lowest match aggregate ===
Aggregate	Team 1	Team 2	Venue	Date
140/11	RCB (68)	SRH (72/1)	Brabourne Stadium, Mumbai, India	23 April 2022
141/13	RCB (70)	CSK (71/3)	M. A. Chidambaram Stadium, Chennai, India	23 March 2019
141/14	RCB (70)	RR (71/4)	Sheikh Zayed Stadium, Abu Dhabi, UAE	26 April 2014
152/11	DC (75)	RCB (77/1)	Arun Jaitley Stadium, Delhi, India	27 April 2026
168/11	DC (82)	RCB (86/1)	DY Patil Stadium, Mumbai, India	24 April 2010
Last updated: 30 April 2026

== Batting records ==
=== Most Career runs ===
A run is the basic means of scoring in cricket. A run is scored when the batsman hits the ball with his bat and with his partner runs the length of 22 yards (20 m) of the pitch. Royal Challengers Bengaluru's Virat kohli with 9,336 runs is the leading run scorer in IPL.

Rank	Runs	Player	Matches	Innings	Period
1	9,336♠	Virat Kohli	283	275	2008–2026
2	4,491	AB de Villiers	156	144	2011–2021
3	3,163	Chris Gayle	85	84	2011–2017
4	1,636	Faf du Plessis	45	45	2022–2024
5	1,597	Rajat Patidar	56	51	2021–2026
6	1,594	Devdutt Padikkal	54	53	2020-2026
7	1,266	Glenn Maxwell	52	50	2021-2024
8	1,132	Jacques Kallis	42	42	2008-2010
9	937	Dinesh Karthik	60	53	2015-2024
10	898	Rahul Dravid	45	37	2008-2010
Last Updated: 27 May 2026

=== Most career runs as captain ===
Rank	Runs	Player	Matches	Innings	Period
1	4,994	Virat Kohli	143	142	2011-2023
2	1,473	Faf du Plessis	42	42	2022-2024
3	766	Rajat Patidar	27	25	2025-2026
4	371	Rahul Dravid	14	14	2008-2008
5	109	Jitesh Sharma	02	02	2025-2025
Last updated: 27 May 2026

=== Fastest Run getters ===
Runs	Batsman	Innings	Record Date	Reference
1,000	Chris Gayle	20	2 May 2012	
2,000	Chris Gayle	41	14 May 2013	
3,000	Chris Gayle	77	8 April 2017	
4,000	AB de Villiers	125	17 October 2020	
5,000	Virat Kohli†	157	28 March 2019	
6,000	Virat Kohli†	188	22 April 2021	
7,000	Virat Kohli†	225	6 May 2023	
8,000	Virat Kohli†	244	22 May 2024	
9,000	Virat Kohli†	267	27 April 2026	

=== Most runs in each batting position ===
Batting position	Batsman	Innings	Runs	Average	Career Span	Ref
Opener	Virat Kohli	144	5,684	47.76	2008–2026	
Number 3	Virat Kohli	93	2,815	35.18	2008-2022	
Number 4	AB de Villiers	61	1,739	37.80	2011-2021	
Number 5	AB de Villiers	32	906	39.39	2011-2021	
Number 6	Dinesh Karthik	13	346	34.60	2015-2024	
Number 7	Dinesh Karthik	16	315	35.00	2022-2024	
Number 8	Vinay Kumar	14	108	09.81	2008-2013	
Number 9	Harshal Patel	13	88	11.00	2012-2023	
Number 10	Mohammed Siraj	16	69	09.85	2018-2024	
Number 11	Mohammed Siraj	05	27	13.50	2018-2024	
Last Updated: 27 May 2026

=== Highest individual score ===
Rank	Runs	Player	Opposition	Venue	Date
1	175*	Chris Gayle	PWI	M. Chinnaswamy Stadium, Bengaluru, India	23 April 2013
2	133*	AB de Villiers	MI	Wankhede Stadium, Mumbai, India	10 May 2015
3	129*	AB de Villiers	GL	M. Chinnaswamy Stadium, Bengaluru, India	14 May 2016
4	128*	Chris Gayle	DD	Arun Jaitley Stadium, Delhi, India	17 May 2012
5	117	Chris Gayle	PBKS	M. Chinnaswamy Stadium, Bengaluru, India	6 May 2015
Last Updated: 20 October 2020

=== Highest individual score – progression of record ===
Runs	Player	Opponent	Venue	Date
18*	Praveen Kumar	KKR	M. Chinnaswamy Stadium,Bengaluru	18 April 2008
39*	Mark Boucher	MI	Wankhede Stadium,Mumbai	20 April 2008
44	Ross Taylor	RR	M. Chinnaswamy Stadium,Bengaluru	26 April 2008
53	Ross Taylor	CSK	M. Chinnaswamy Stadium,Bengaluru	28 April 2008
54	Jacques Kallis	DC	Arun Jaitley Stadium,Delhi	30 April 2008
66	Rahul Dravid	PBKS	M. Chinnaswamy Stadium,Bengaluru	5 May 2008
75*	Rahul Dravid	RR	Sawai Mansingh Stadium, Jaipur	17 May 2008
81	Ross Taylor	KKR	SuperSport Park, Centurion	12 May 2009
114*	Manish Pandey	DCH	SuperSport Park, Centurion	21 May 2009
128*	Chris Gayle	DC	Arun Jaitley Stadium,Delhi	17 May 2012
175*	Chris Gayle	PWI	M. Chinnaswamy Stadium,Bengaluru	23 April 2013
Last updated: 3 June 2025

=== Highest career average ===
A batsman's batting average is the total number of runs they have scored divided by the number of times they have been dismissed.

Rank	Average	Player	Innings	Not out	Runs	Period
1	43.32	Chris Gayle	84	11	3,163	2011–2017
2	41.20	AB de Villiers	144	35	4,491	2011–2021
3	40.41	Virat Kohli	275	44	9,336	2008–2026
4	39.08	Tim David	24	12	469	2021-2026
5	38.04	Faf du Plessis	45	2	1,636	2022–2024
Qualification: 20 innings. Last Updated: 27 May 2026

=== Highest average in each batting position ===
Batting position	Batsman	Innings	Runs	Average	Career Span	Ref
Opener	Virat Kohli	144	5,684	47.76	2008–2026	
Number 3	AB de Villiers	45	1,772	49.22	2013–2021	
Number 4	AB de Villiers	61	1,739	37.80	2011–2021	
Number 5	AB de Villiers	32	906	39.39	2011–2021	
Number 6	Tim David	10	153	38.25	2025–2026	
Number 7	Dinesh Karthik	16	315	35.00	2022–2024	
Number 8	Vinay Kumar	14	108	09.81	2008–2013	
Number 9	Harshal Patel	13	88	11.00	2012–2023	
Number 10	Mohammed Siraj	16	69	09.85	2018–2024	
Number 11	Yuzvendra Chahal	14	16	4.00	2014–2021	
Qualification: Minimum 10 innings batted at position. Last updated: 27 May 2026

=== Highest strike rates ===
Rank	Strike rate	Player	Runs	Balls Faced	Period
1	165.14	Rajat Patidar	1,597	967	2021–2026
2	162.95	Dinesh Karthik	937	575	2015–2024
3	159.24	Glenn Maxwell	1,266	795	2021–2024
4	158.63	AB de Villiers	4,491	2,831	2011–2021
5	152.72	Chris Gayle	3,163	2,071	2011–2017
Qualification: Minimum 500 balls faced. Last Updated: 27 May 2026

=== Most half-centuries ===
A half-century is a score of between 50 and 99 runs. Statistically, once a batsman's score reaches 100, it is no longer considered a half-century but a century.

Rank	Half centuries	Player	Innings	Period
1	68	Virat Kohli	275	2008–2026
2	37	AB de Villiers	144	2011–2021
3	19	Chris Gayle	84	2011–2017
4	15	Faf du Plessis	45	2022–2024
5	12	Rajat Patidar	48	2021-2026
5	12	Glenn Maxwell	50	2021–2024
Last Updated: 17 May 2026

=== Most centuries ===
A century is a score of 100 or more runs in a single innings.

Rank	Centuries	Player	Innings	Period
1	9	Virat Kohli	271	2008–2026
2	5	Chris Gayle	84	2011–2017
3	2	AB de Villiers	144	2010–2021
4	1	Will Jacks	8	2024-2024
4	1	Manish Pandey	17	2009–2010
4	1	Rajat Patidar	48	2021–2026
4	1	Devdutt Padikkal	49	2020–2026
Last Updated: 13 May 2026

=== Most sixes ===
Rank	Sixes	Player	Innings	Period
1	316	Virat Kohli†	275	2008–2026
2	239	Chris Gayle	84	2011–2017
3	238	AB de Villiers	144	2011–2021
4	109	Rajat Patidar†	51	2021–2026
5	70	Faf du Plessis	45	2022–2024
Last Updated: 27 May 2026

=== Most fours ===
Rank	Fours	Player	Innings	Period
1	844	Virat Kohli†	275	2008–2026
2	362	AB de Villiers	144	2011–2021
3	248	Chris Gayle	84	2011–2017
4	165	Devdutt Padikkal	53	2020–2026
5	156	Faf du Plessis	45	2022–2024
Last Updated: 27 May 2026

=== Highest strike rates in an inning ===
Rank	Strike rate	Player	Score	Opposition	Venue	Date
1	387.50	AB de Villiers	31 (8)	PWI	M. Chinnaswamy Stadium, Bengaluru, India	23 April 2013
2	385.71	Balachandra Akhil	27* (7)	DC	Rajiv Gandhi International Cricket Stadium, Hyderabad, India	25 May 2008
3	378.57	Romario Shepherd	53 (14)	CSK	M. Chinnaswamy Stadium, Bengaluru, India	3 May 2025
4	375.00	Dinesh Karthik	30* (8)	SRH	Wankhede Stadium, Mumbai, India	8 May 2022
5	372.72	AB de Villiers	41 (11)	MI	M. Chinnaswamy Stadium, Bengaluru, India	19 April 2015
Qualification: Minimum 25 runs. Last Updated: 4 May 2025.

=== Most sixes in an innings ===
Rank	Sixes	Player	Opposition	Venue	Date
1	17	Chris Gayle	PWI	M. Chinnaswamy Stadium, Bengaluru, India	23 April 2013
2	13	Chris Gayle	DD	Arun Jaitley Stadium, Delhi, India	17 May 2012
3	12	Chris Gayle	PBKS	M. Chinnaswamy Stadium, Bengaluru, India	6 May 2015
3	12	AB de Villiers	GL	M. Chinnaswamy Stadium, Bengaluru, India	14 May 2016
5	10	Will Jacks	GT	Narendra Modi Stadium, Ahmedabad, India	28 April 2024
Last Updated: 28 April 2024

=== Most fours in an innings ===
Rank	Fours	Player	Opposition	Venue	Date
1	19	AB de Villiers	MI	Wankhede Stadium, Mumbai, India	10 May 2015
2	13	Chris Gayle	PWI	M. Chinnaswamy Stadium, Bengaluru, India	23 April 2013
2	13	Virat Kohli	GT	M. Chinnaswamy Stadium, Bengaluru, India	21 May 2023
4	12	Virat Kohli	PBKS	M. Chinnaswamy Stadium, Bengaluru, India	18 May 2016
4	12	AB de Villiers	SRH	M. Chinnaswamy Stadium, Bengaluru, India	17 May 2018
4	12	Devdutt Padikkal	MI	Sheikh Zayed Stadium, Abu Dhabi, UAE	28 October 2020
4	12	Rajat Patidar	LSG	Eden Gardens, Kolkata, India	25 May 2022
4	12	Virat Kohli	SRH	Rajiv Gandhi International Cricket Stadium, Hyderabad, India	18 May 2023
4	12	Virat Kohli	RR	Sawai Mansingh Stadium, Jaipur, India	6 April 2024
Last Updated: 6 April 2024

=== Most runs in a season ===
Rank	Runs	Player	Matches	Innings	Season
1	973	Virat Kohli	16	16	2016
2	741	Virat Kohli	15	15	2024
3	733	Chris Gayle	15	14	2012
4	730	Faf du Plessis	14	14	2023
5	708	Chris Gayle	16	16	2013
Last Updated: 22 May 2024

=== Most ducks ===
A duck refers to a batsman being dismissed without scoring a run.

Rank	Ducks	Player	Innings	Period
1	12	Virat Kohli †	270	2008–2026
2	8	Glenn Maxwell	50	2021–2024
2	8	AB de Villiers	144	2011–2021
4	6	Harshal Patel	32	2012–2023
4	6	Dinesh Karthik	53	2015–2024
Last Updated: 10 May 2026

== Bowling records ==
=== Most career wickets ===
Rank	Wickets	Player	Matches	Innings	Period
1	139	Yuzvendra Chahal	113	112	2014–2021
2	99	Harshal Patel	80	77	2012–2023
3	83	Mohammed Siraj	87	87	2018–2024
4	72	Vinay Kumar	64	63	2008–2013
5	58	Josh Hazlewood	39	39	2022-2026
Last Updated: 27 May 2026

=== Best bowling figures in an innings ===
Rank	Figures	Player	Opposition	Venue	Date
1	5/5	Anil Kumble	RR	Newlands, Cape Town, South Africa	18 April 2009
2	5/18	Wanindu Hasaranga	SRH	Wankhede Stadium, Mumbai, India	8 May 2022
3	5/25	Jaydev Unadkat	DD	Arun Jaitley Stadium, Delhi, India	10 May 2013
4	5/27	Harshal Patel	MI	M. A. Chidambaram Stadium, Chennai, India	9 April 2021
5	4/9	Samuel Badree	MI	M. Chinnaswamy Stadium, Bengaluru, India	14 April 2017
Last Updated: 9 August 2022

=== Best career bowling average ===
Rank	Average	Player	Wickets	Runs	Balls	Period
1	17.40	Pawan Negi	20	348	284	2017–2019
2	20.38	Mitchell Starc	34	693	580	2014–2015
3	21.28	Ravi Rampaul	14	298	262	2013–2014
4	21.37	Wanindu Hasaranga	35	552	748	2021–2023
5	22.03	Yuzvendra Chahal	34	3063	2424	2014–2021
Qualification: 250 balls. Last Updated: 27 May 2026

=== Best career economy rate ===
Rank	Economy rate	Player	Wickets	Runs	Balls	Period
1	6.31	Daniel Vettori	17	547	510	2011–2012
2	6.57	Anil Kumble	45	1,058	965	2008–2010
3	6.82	Ravi Rampaul	14	298	262	2013–2014
4	7.10	Muttiah Muralitharan	21	561	474	2012–2014
5	7.13	Moeen Ali	10	308	259	2018–2020
Qualification: 250 balls. Last Updated: 18 April 2021

=== Best career strike rate ===
Rank	Strike rate	Player	Wickets	Runs	Balls	Period
1	14.2	Pawan Negi	20	348	284	2017–2019
2	15.2	Josh Hazlewood	58	1296	882	2021–2026
3	15.48	Bhuvneshwar Kumar	43	955	666	2025–2026
4	15.77	Wanindu Hasaranga	26	748	552	2021–2023
5	15.82	Rasikh Salam	17	448	269	2025–2026
Qualification: 250 balls. Last Updated: 27 May 2026

=== Most four-wickets (& over) hauls in an innings ===
Rank	Four-wicket hauls	Player	Innings	Balls	Wickets	Period
1	3	Anil Kumble	86	1,791	90	2012–2022
1	3	Harshal Patel	39	860	69	2017–2024
2	2	Wanindu Hasaranga	79	1,764	96	2016–2023
2	2	Yuzvendra Chahal	102	1,817	94	2016–2025
2	2	Sreenath Aravind	18	411	33	2021–2025
Last Updated: 31 March 2025

=== Best economy rates in an inning ===
Rank	Economy	Player	Overs	Runs	Wickets	Opposition	Venue	Date
1	1.50	Jacques Kallis	2	3	2	DC	DY Patil Stadium, Mumbai, India	24 April 2010
1	1.50	Chris Gayle	2	3	0	GL	M. Chinnaswamy Stadium, Bengaluru, India	14 May 2016
1	1.50	Yuzvendra Chahal	4	6	1	CSK	M. A. Chidambaram Stadium, Chennai, India	23 March 2019
4	1.57	Anil Kumble	3.1	5	5	RR	Newlands, Cape Town, South Africa	18 April 2009
5	1.66	Bhuvneshwar Kumar	3	5	3	DC	Arun Jaitley Cricket Stadium, Delhi, India	27 April 2026
Qualification: 12 balls bowled. Last Updated: 27 May 2026

=== Best strike rates in an inning ===
Rank	Strike rate	Player	Balls	Runs	Wickets	Opposition	Venue	Date
1	2.0	Sachin Baby	4	4	2	GL	M. Chinnaswamy Stadium, Bengaluru, India	14 May 2016
2	3.0	Chris Gayle	6	5	2	PWI	M. Chinnaswamy Stadium, Bengaluru, India	23 April 2013
2	3.0	Zaheer Khan	12	17	4	CSK	M. Chinnaswamy Stadium, Bengaluru, India	18 May 2013
2	3.0	Pawan Negi	6	3	2	DD	M. Chinnaswamy Stadium, Bengaluru, India	8 April 2017
5	3.8	Anil Kumble	19	5	5	RR	Newlands, Cape Town, South Africa	18 April 2009
Qualification: Minimum 2 wickets. Last Updated: 20 October 2020.

=== Most runs conceded in a match ===
Rank	Figures	Player	Overs	Opposition	Venue	Date
1	0/61	Shane Watson	4	SRH	M. Chinnaswamy Stadium, Bengaluru, India	29 May 2016
1	0/61	Tim Southee	4	KKR	M. Chinnaswamy Stadium, Bengaluru, India	5 April 2019
3	0/59	Abu Nechim	4	MI	M. Chinnaswamy Stadium, Bengaluru, India	15 April 2015
3	0/59	Umesh Yadav	4	RR	M. Chinnaswamy Stadium, Bengaluru, India	15 April 2018
5	0/58	Corey Anderson	4	CSK	M. Chinnaswamy Stadium, Bengaluru, India	25 April 2018
Last updated:20 October 2020

=== Most wickets in a season ===
Rank	Wickets	Player	Matches	Season
1	32	Harshal Patel	15	2021
2	26	Wanindu Hasaranga	16	2022
3	26	Bhuvneshwar Kumar	15	2026
4	23	Vinay Kumar	15	2013
4	23	Yuzvendra Chahal	15	2015
Last Updated: 27 May 2026

=== Hat-tricks ===
S. No	Bowler	Against	Wickets	Venue	Date	Ref.
1	Praveen Kumar	RR	Damien Martyn (b); Sumit Narwal (c Manish Pandey); Paras Dogra (b)	M. Chinnaswamy Stadium, Bengaluru, India	18 March 2010	
2	Samuel Badree	MI	Parthiv Patel (c Chris Gayle); Mitchell McClenaghan (c Mandeep Singh); Rohit Sharma (b)	M. Chinnaswamy Stadium, Bengaluru, India	14 April 2017	
3	Harshal Patel	MI	Hardik Pandya (c Virat Kohli); Kieron Pollard (b); Rahul Chahar (lbw)	Dubai International Cricket Stadium, Dubai, UAE	26 September 2021	
Last Updated: 11 October 2021

== Individual wicket-keeping records ==
=== Most career dismissals ===
Rank	Dismissals	Player	Matches	Innings	Period
1	45	Dinesh Karthik	55	54	2015–2024
2	35	Jitesh Sharma	30	30	2025–2026
3	34	AB de Villiers	51	50	2011–2021
4	23	Parthiv Patel	32	32	2014–2019
5	16	Mark Boucher	26	26	2008–2010
Last updated: 27 May 2026

=== Most career catches ===
Rank	Catches	Player	Matches	Innings	Period
1	36	Dinesh Karthik	60	54	2015–2024
2	33	Jitesh Sharma	30	30	2025–2026
3	26	AB de Villiers	156	50	2011–2021
4	20	Parthiv Patel	32	32	2014–2019
5	13	Mark Boucher	27	26	2008–2010
Last updated: 27 May 2026

=== Most career stumpings ===
Rank	Stumpings	Player	Matches	Innings	Period
1	9	Dinesh Karthik	60	54	2015–2024
2	8	AB de Villiers	156	50	2011–2021
3	4	Robin Uthappa	31	14	2009–2010
3	4	KL Rahul	19	15	2013–2016
5	3	Parthiv Patel	32	32	2014–2019
5	3	Mark Boucher	27	26	2008–2010
5	3	Quinton de Kock	8	8	2018-2018
5	3	Kedar Jadhav	17	12	2016–2017
Last updated: 22 May 2024

=== Most dismissals in an innings ===
Rank	Dismissals	Player	Opposition	Venue	Date
1	4	Anuj Rawat	PBKS	M. Chinnaswamy Stadium, Bengaluru, India	25 March 2024
1	4	Jitesh Sharma	KKR	Eden Gardens, Kolkata	22 March 2025
1	4	Jitesh Sharma	DC	Arun Jaitley Cricket Stadium, Delhi	27 April 2026
2	3	Parthiv Patel	KXIP	Dubai International Stadium, Dubai, UAE	28 April 2014
2	3	Dinesh Karthik	DD	Arun Jaitley Stadium, Delhi, India	26 April 2015
2	3	Dinesh Karthik	RR	Maharashtra Cricket Association Stadium, Pune, India	20 May 2015
2	3	Quinton de Kock	KXIP	M. Chinnaswamy Stadium, Bengaluru, India	13 April 2018
2	3	AB de Villiers	SRH	Sheikh Zayed Stadium, Abu Dhabi, UAE	6 November 2020
2	3	AB de Villiers	DC	Narendra Modi Stadium, Ahmedabad, India	27 April 2021
2	3	Dinesh Karthik	LSG	Ekana Cricket Stadium, Lucknow, India	1 May 2023
Last Updated: 27 May 2026

=== Most dismissals in a series ===
Rank	Dismissals	Player	Matches	Innings	Series
1	20	Jitesh Sharma	15	15	2025
2	18	Dinesh Karthik	16	15	2015
3	15	Jitesh Sharma	15	15	2026
4	12	Parthiv Patel	12	12	2014
4	12	Dinesh Karthik	16	16	2022
Last Updated: 27 May 2026

== Individual fielding records ==
=== Most career catches ===
Rank	Catches	Player	Matches	Innings	Period
1	126	Virat Kohli	282	280	2008–2026
2	70	AB de Villiers	156	104	2011–2021
3	28	Mohammed Siraj	87	87	2018–2024
5	28	Devdutt Padikkal	54	54	2020–2026
4	24	Yuzvendra Chahal	113	112	2014–2021
Last Updated: 27 May 2026

=== Most catches in an innings ===
Rank	Dismissals	Player	Opposition	Venue	Date
1	3	Luke Pomersbach	MI	M. A. Chidambaram Stadium, Chennai, India	27 May 2011
1	3	Ravi Rampaul	RR	M. Chinnaswamy Stadium, Bengaluru, India	20 April 2013
1	3	AB de Villiers	PBKS	M. Chinnaswamy Stadium, Bengaluru, India	18 May 2016
1	3	Travis Head	MI	Wankhede Stadium, Mumbai, India	1 May 2017
1	3	AB de Villiers	PBKS	M. Chinnaswamy Stadium, Bengaluru, India	24 April 2019
1	3	Devdutt Padikkal	RR	Dubai International Cricket Stadium, Dubai, UAE	29 September 2021
1	3	Virat Kohli	DC	M. Chinnaswamy Stadium, Bengaluru, India	15 April 2023
1	3	Mayank Dagar	LSG	M. Chinnaswamy Stadium, Bengaluru, India	2 April 2024
1	3	Phil Salt	CSK	M. A. Chidambaram Stadium, Chennai	28 March 2025
1	3	Devdutt Padikkal	SRH	M. Chinnaswamy Stadium, Bengaluru, India	28 March 2026
1	3	Virat Kohli	SRH	M. Chinnaswamy Stadium, Bengaluru, India	28 March 2026
Last Updated: 1 April 2025

=== Most catches in a season ===
Rank	Catches	Player	Matches	Innings	Series
1	19	AB de Villiers	16	16	2016
2	13	Virat Kohli	14	14	2023
3	12	Devdutt Padikkal	15	15	2026
4	9	Virat Kohli	16	16	2009
4	9	Virat Kohli	16	16	2022
4	9	Virat Kohli	15	15	2026
4	9	Mayank Agarwal	16	15	2012
4	9	Mitchell Starc	14	14	2014
4	9	Daniel Christian	9	9	2021
4	9	Phil Salt	13	13	2025
Last Updated: 27 May 2026

== Other individual records ==
=== Most matches ===
Rank	Matches	Player	Period
1	283	Virat Kohli	2008–2026
2	156	AB de Villiers	2011–2021
3	113	Yuzvendra Chahal	2014–2021
4	87	Mohammed Siraj	2018–2024
5	85	Chris Gayle	2011–2017
Last Updated: 27 May 2026

=== Most matches as captain ===
Rank	Matches	Player	Won	Lost	wide	NR	Win %	Period
1	142	Virat Kohli	66	69	3	4	48.91	2011–2023
2	42	Faf du Plessis	21	21	0	0	50.00	2022–2024
3	27	Rajat Patidar	19	8	0	0	70.37	2025–2026
4	26	Anil Kumble	15	11	0	0	57.69	2009–2010
5	22	Daniel Vettori	12	10	0	0	54.54	2011–2012
Last Updated: 27 May 2026

== Partnership records ==
=== Highest partnerships by wicket ===
Wicket	Runs	First batsman	Second batsman	Opposition	Venue	Date
1st Wicket	181*	Virat Kohli	Devdutt Padikkal	RR	Wankhede Stadium, Mumbai, India	22 April 2021
2nd Wicket	229	Virat Kohli	AB de Villiers	GL	M. Chinnaswamy Stadium, Bengaluru, India	14 May 2016
3rd Wicket	121*	Virat Kohli	KL Rahul	GL	Saurashtra Cricket Association Stadium, Rajkot, India	24 April 2016
4th Wicket	144	Shimron Hetmyer	Gurkeerat Singh	SRH	M. Chinnaswamy Stadium, Bengaluru, India	4 May 2019
5th Wicket	121*	AB de Villiers	Marcus Stoinis	PBKS	M. Chinnaswamy Stadium, Bengaluru, India	24 April 2019
6th Wicket	76*	Chris Gayle	Arun Karthik	MI	M. Chinnaswamy Stadium, Bengaluru, India	4 April 2013
7th Wicket	91*	AB de Villiers	Iqbal Abdulla	GL	M. Chinnaswamy Stadium, Bengaluru, India	24 May 2016
8th Wicket	51*	Ravi Rampaul	Vinay Kumar	MI	Wankhede Stadium, Mumbai, India	27 April 2013
9th Wicket	38	Tim Southee	Mohammed Siraj	CSK	Maharashtra Cricket Association Stadium, Pune, India	5 May 2018
10th Wicket	19*	Yuzvendra Chahal	Mohammed Siraj	CSK	Wankhede Stadium, Mumbai, India	25 April 2021
Last Updated: 25 April 2021

=== Highest partnerships by runs ===
Wicket	runs	First batsman	Second batsman	Opposition	Venue	Date
2nd Wicket	229	Virat Kohli	AB de Villiers	GL	M. Chinnaswamy Stadium, Bengaluru, India	14 May 2016
2nd Wicket	215*	Virat Kohli	AB de Villiers	MI	Wankhede Stadium, Mumbai, India	10 May 2015
2nd Wicket	204*	Virat Kohli	Chris Gayle	DD	Arun Jaitley Stadium, Delhi, India	17 May 2012
1st Wicket	181*	Virat Kohli	Devdutt Padikkal	RR	Wankhede Stadium, Mumbai, India	22 April 2021
1st Wicket	167	Chris Gayle	Tillakaratne Dilshan	PWI	M. Chinnaswamy Stadium, Bengaluru, India	23 April 2013
Last Updated: 22 April 2021
