= List of Rajasthan Royals records =

Jaipur based franchisee of the Indian Premier League

Rajasthan Royals (often abbreviated as RR) are a franchise cricket team based in Jaipur, Rajasthan, that plays in the Indian Premier League (IPL). Founded in 2008 as one of the initial eight IPL franchises, the team is based at the Sawai Mansingh Stadium in Jaipur.

The team won the inaugural edition of the IPL under the captaincy of Shane Warne, despite being written off as a title contender by the media and fans. The Royals were also the runners-up of the 2013 Champions League Twenty20 under Rahul Dravid's captaincy.

On 14 July 2015, the verdict reached by a panel appointed by the Supreme Court of India suspended Rajasthan Royals and Chennai Super Kings for two years over a 2013 betting scandal, meaning they could not participate in both the 2016 and 2017 IPL tournaments. They returned to the competition from the 2018 season.

== Listing criteria ==
In general the top five are listed in each category, except when there is a tie for the last place among the five, when all the tied record holders may be noted.

== Listing notation ==
Team notation

- (200/3) indicates that a team scored 200 runs for three wickets and the innings was closed, either due to a successful run chase or if no playing time remained
- (200) indicates that a team scored 200 runs and was all out

Batting notation

- (100) indicates that a batsman scored 100 runs and was out
- (100*) indicates that a batsman scored 100 runs and was not out

Bowling notation

- (5/20) indicates that a bowler has captured 5 wickets while conceding 20 runs

Currently playing

- † indicates a current cricketer

Date

- indicates the date the match was played

== Team scoring records ==
As of 22 April 2024

=== Highest innings total ===
Score	Opposition	Venue	Date
243/8	SRH	Maharaja Yadavindra Singh International Cricket Stadium, New Chandigarh	27 May 2026
242/6	SRH	Rajiv Gandhi International Cricket Stadium, Hyderabad	23 March 2025
228/4	PBKS	Maharaja Yadavindra Singh International Cricket Stadium, New Chandigarh	28 April 2026
228/6	SRH	Sawai Mansingh Stadium, Jaipur	25 April 2026
226/6	KXIP	Sharjah Cricket Stadium, Sharjah	27 September 2020
225/6	DC	Sawai Mansingh Stadium, Jaipur	1 May 2026

- Source: ESPNcricinfo

=== Lowest innings total ===
Score	Opposition	Venue	Date
58	RCB	Newlands Cricket Ground, Cape Town	18 April 2009
59	RCB	Sawai Mansingh Stadium, Jaipur	14 May 2023
81	KKR	Eden Gardens, Kolkata	17 April 2011
85	KKR	Sharjah Cricket Stadium, Sharjah	7 October 2021
90/9	MI	Sharjah Cricket Stadium, Sharjah	5 October 2021

- Source: ESPNcricinfo

=== Highest total conceded ===
Score	Opposition	Venue	Date
286/6	SRH	Rajiv Gandhi International Cricket Stadium, Hyderabad	23 March 2025
246/5	CSK	M. A. Chidambaram Stadium, Chennai	14 May 2016
223/6	KKR	Eden Gardens, Kolkata	16 April 2024
223/2	KXIP	Sharjah Cricket Stadium, Sharjah	27 September 2020
221/6	PBKS	Wankhede Stadium, Mumbai	12 April 2021
221/3	KXIP	Punjab Cricket Association Stadium, Mohali	28 May 2008

- Source: ESPNcricinfo

=== Lowest totals conceded ===
Score	Opposition	Venue	Date
70	RCB	Sheikh Zayed Cricket Stadium, Abu Dhabi	26 April 2014
87	DD	Wankhede Stadium, Mumbai	30 May 2008
92	MI	Sawai Mansingh Stadium, Jaipur	17 April 2013
94/8	MI	Sawai Mansingh Stadium, Jaipur	29 April 2011
105	RCB	Centurion Park, Centurion	7 May 2009

- Source: ESPNcricinfo

== Individual batting records ==
As of 2 May 2024

=== Most runs ===
Rank	Runs	Player	Matches	Innings	Period
1	4,027	Sanju Samson	149	144	2013–2025
2	3,055	Jos Buttler	83	82	2018–2024
3	2,810	Ajinkya Rahane	100	93	2011–2019
4	2,593	Yashasvi Jaiswal	82	82	2020–2026
5	2,372	Shane Watson	78	76	2008–2015

=== Fastest runs getter ===
Runs	Batsman	Innings	Record Date
1,000	Vaibhav Sooryavanshi	23	29 May 2026
2,000	Jos Buttler	49	30 April 2022
3,000	Jos Buttler	79	17 April 2024
4,000	Sanju Samson	144	20 May 2025

=== Highest individual score ===
Runs	Player	Opposition	Venue	Date
124	Jos Buttler	SRH	Arun Jaitley Stadium, Delhi	2 May 2021
124	Yashasvi Jaiswal	MI	Wankhede Stadium, Mumbai	30 April 2023
119	Sanju Samson	PBKS	Wankhede Stadium, Mumbai	12 April 2021
116	Jos Buttler	DC	Wankhede Stadium, Mumbai	22 April 2022
107*	Ben Stokes	MI	Sheikh Zayed Cricket Stadium, Abu Dhabi	25 October 2020
107*	Jos Buttler	KKR	Eden Gardens, Kolkata	16 April 2024

- Source: ESPNcricinfo

=== Highest career average ===
Rank	Average	Player	Innings	Not out	Runs	Period
1	44.70	Vaibhav Sooryavanshi	23	0	1028	2025–2026
2	41.84	Jos Buttler	82	9	3,053	2018–2024
3	36.49	Shane Watson	76	11	2,372	2008–2015
4	36.20	Ross Taylor	11	6	181	2011-2011
Qualification: 10 innings. Last Updated: 1 May 2026

=== Highest strike rates ===
Rank	Strike rate	Player	Runs	Balls Faced	Period
1	228.95	Vaibhav Sooryavanshi	1028	449	2025 -2026
2	172.87	Donovan Ferreira	325	191	2026
3	154.19	Dhruv Jurel	1195	775	2023-2026
4	152.80	Yashasvi Jaiswal	2593	1697	2020-2026
5	152.15	Shimron Hetmyer	989	650	2022-2026
6	147.79	Jos Buttler	3,055	1,140	2018-2024

=== Most centuries ===
Rank	Centuries	Player	High Score	Period
1	7	Jos Buttler	124	2018–2024
	2	Sanju Samson	119	2013–2025
	2	Yashasvi Jaiswal	124	2020–present
	2	Ajinkya Rahane	105	2011–2019
	2	Shane Watson	104	2008–2015
	2	Vaibhav Sooryavanshi	103	2025–Present

=== Most career sixes ===
Sixes	Player	Seasons
192	Sanju Samson	2013–2025
135	Jos Buttler	2018–2023
110	Yashasvi Jaiswal	2020–2026
109	Shane Watson	2008–2015
108	Riyan Parag	2019–2026
96	Vaibhav Sooryavanshi	2025-2026

- Source: ESPNcricinfo

=== Most sixes in an inning ===
Sixes	Player	Opposition	Venue	Date
12	Vaibhav Sooryavanshi	SRH	Maharaja Yadavindra Singh International Cricket Stadium, New Chandigarh	27 May 2026
12	Vaibhav Sooryavanshi	SRH	Sawai Mansingh Stadium, Jaipur	25 April 2026
11	Vaibhav Sooryavanshi	GT	Sawai Mansingh Stadium, Jaipur	28 April 2025
10	Vaibhav Sooryavanshi	LSG	Sawai Mansingh Stadium, Jaipur	19 May 2026
10	Sanju Samson	RCB	M. Chinnaswamy Stadium, Bengaluru	15 April 2018
9	Sanju Samson	CSK	Sharjah Cricket Stadium, Sharjah	22 September 2020
9	Jos Buttler	DC	Arun Jaitley Stadium, Delhi	2 May 2021
8	Yusuf Pathan	MI	Brabourne Stadium, Mumbai	13 March 2010
8	Yusuf Pathan	DEC	Sardar Patel Stadium, Ahmedabad	26 March 2010
8	Jos Buttler	SRH	Arun Jaitley Stadium, Delhi	2 May 2021
8	Yashasvi Jaiswal	MI	Wankhede Stadium, Mumbai	30 April 2023

- Source: ESPNcricinfo

=== Most runs in a season ===
Runs	Player	Season
863	Jos Buttler	2022
776	Vaibhav Sooryavanshi	2026
625	Yashasvi Jaiswal	2023
573	Riyan Parag	2024
560	Ajinkya Rahane	2012
559	Yashasvi Jaiswal	2025
548	Jos Buttler	2018
531	Sanju Samson	2024

- Source: ESPNcricinfo

== Individual bowling records ==
As of 2 May 2024

=== Most career wickets ===
Rank	Wickets	Player	Matches	Innings	Period
1	82	Jofra Archer	63	63	2018–2026
2	66	Yuzvendra Chahal	46	46	2022–2024
3	65	Siddharth Trivedi	76	75	2008–2013
4	61	Shane Watson	78	70	2008–2015
5	57	Shane Warne	55	54	2008–2011
Last Updated: 14 April 2026

=== Best figures in an innings ===
Figures	Player	Opposition	Venue	Date
6/14	Sohail Tanvir	CSK	Sawai Mansingh Stadium, Jaipur	4 May 2008
5/16	James Faulkner	SRH	Rajiv Gandhi International Cricket Stadium, Hyderabad	17 May 2013
5/18	Sandeep Sharma	MI	Sawai Mansingh Stadium, Jaipur	22 April 2024
5/20	James Faulkner	SRH	Sawai Mansingh Stadium, Jaipur	27 April 2013
5/40	Yuzvendra Chahal	KKR	Brabourne Stadium, Mumbai	18 April 2022

- Source: ESPNcricinfo

=== Most wickets in a season ===
Wickets	Player	Season
28	James Faulkner	2013
27	Yuzvendra Chahal	2022
25	Jofra Archer	2026
22	Sohail Tanvir	2008
21	Yuzvendra Chahal	2023
20	Shreyas Gopal	2019
20	Jofra Archer	2020

- Source: ESPNcricinfo

=== Hat-tricks ===
Five players have taken hat-tricks in the IPL for Rajasthan. Ajit Chandila was the first to do so, taking his hat-trick against Pune Warriors India in 2012. The other bowlers to take a hat-trick for the team are Pravin Tambe and Shane Watson in 2014, Shreyas Gopal in 2019, and Yuzvendra Chahal in 2022.

== Individual wicket-keeping records ==
As of 22 April 2024

Heinrich Klaasen and Sanju Samson have both taken four dismissals in an innings for the team, Klaasen in 2018 against Royal Challengers Bengaluru and Samson in 2020 against Chennai Super Kings.

Sanju Samson took 16 dismissals for the team in 2022 and 11 in 2021. The only other wicket-keeper to reach double figures in a season for the team is Jos Buttler who took ten dismissals in 2018.

Career wicket-keeping dismissals
Dismissals	Player	Seasons
74	Sanju Samson	2013–2024
17	Dishant Yagnik	2011–2014
17	Jos Buttler	2018–2023
16	Mahesh Rawat	2008–2009
13	Dhruv Jurel	2023–2026

- Source: ESPNcricinfo

== Individual fielding records ==
As of 22 April 2024

Riyan Parag is the only Rajasthan player to take four catches in an innings as an outfielder, doing so in a 2022 match against Royal Challengers Bengaluru. Parag also holds the team record for the most outfield catches in a season, taking 17 during 2022.

Most career catches
Catches	Player	Seasons
46	Riyan Parag	2019–2026
40	Ajinkya Rahane	2011–2019
36	Shimron Hetmyer	2022–2026
31	Jos Buttler	2018–2024
30	Yashasvi Jaiswal	2020–2026

- Source: ESPNcricinfo

== Most matches ==
Rank	Matches	Player	Period
1	149	Sanju Samson	2013-2025
2	100	Ajinkya Rahane	2011-2019
3	97	Riyan Parag	2019-2026
4	83	Jos Buttler	2018-2024
5	82	Yashasvi Jaiswal	2020-2026
5	78	Shane Watson	2008–2015
Last Updated: 14 April 2026

== Partnership records ==
Highest partnerships by wicket
Wicket	Runs	Batters		Opposition	Venue	Date
1st	166	Yashasvi Jaiswal	Vaibhav Sooryavanshi	GT	Jaipur	28 April 2025
2nd	150	Jos Buttler	Sanju Samson	SRH	Delhi	2 May 2021
3rd	152	Ben Stokes	Sanju Samson	MI	Abu Dhabi	25 October 2020
4th	121	Dhruv Jurel	Sanju Samson	LSG	Lucknow	27 April 2024
5th	107	Yusuf Pathan	Paras Dogra	MI	Mumbai (BS)	13 March 2010
6th	118	Ravindra Jadeja	Donovan Ferreira	SRH	Hyderabad	13 April 2026
7th	62	Shimron Hetmyer	Dhruv Jurel	PBKS	Guwahati	5 April 2023
8th	69	Brad Hodge	James Faulkner	MI	Ahmedabad	19 May 2014
9th	38	Jos Buttler	Avesh Khan	KKR	Kolkata	23 May 2024
10th	31	Tom Curran	Ankit Rajpoot	KKR	Dubai	30 September 2020

- Source: CricketArchive
