= 2019 Indian Premier League =

Cricket tournament

- Dates: 23 March 2019 – 12 May 2019
- Administrator: Board of Control for Cricket in India
- Cricket format: Twenty20
- Tournament format(s): Double Round-robin and playoffs
- Champions: Mumbai Indians (4th title)
- Runners-up: Chennai Super Kings
- Participants: 8
- Matches: 60
- Most valuable player: Andre Russell (KKR)
- Most runs: David Warner (SRH) (692)
- Most wickets: Imran Tahir (CSK) (26)
- Official website: www.iplt20.com

The 2019 Indian Premier League season (also known as IPL 12) was the twelfth season of the Indian Premier League, a professional Twenty20 cricket league established by the Board of Control for Cricket in India (BCCI) in 2007. At one point other countries were considered to host the tournament, due to the Indian general elections but eventually the tournament was played entirely in India with the season commencing on 23 March.

India's opening match at the 2019 Cricket World Cup was postponed from 2 to 5 June as the BCCI were directed to maintain a mandatory 15-day gap between the conclusion of IPL and India's subsequent international fixture as per Lodha Committee's recommendation.

Delhi Daredevils were renamed as the Delhi Capitals, the franchise announced on 4 December 2018, and also released a new logo. Chennai Super Kings were the defending champions who won their third title.

Mumbai Indians defeated the Chennai Super Kings by 1 run to win the final for their fourth title. David Warner won the Orange Cap for the leading run-scorer of the tournament with 692 runs. Imran Tahir, of Chennai Super Kings, was awarded the Purple Cap for finishing as the leading wicket-taker of the tournament with 26 wickets. Andre Russell of Kolkata Knight Riders was named the Most Valuable Player, and Shubman Gill also of Kolkata Knight Riders was named the Emerging Player of the Tournament.

== Personnel changes ==
The transfers and the retention lists for the season were announced in November 2018. Gautam Gambhir, Yuvraj Singh and Glenn Maxwell were the prominent names among the players being released. Jaydev Unadkat, the costliest Indian player in 2018 auction, was also released. The player auction was held on 18 December 2018 at Jaipur. Jaydev Unadkat and uncapped Varun Chakravarthy were the most expensive player at Rs 8.4 crore. Sam Curran was the most expensive foreign player at Rs 7.2 crore. Prominent players like Cheteshwar Pujara, Brendon McCullum, Mushfiqur Rahim and Alex Hales remained unsold.

== Venues ==
Cities where teams were based during the 2019 season

Bangalore	Delhi	Hyderabad
Royal Challengers Bangalore	Delhi Capitals	Sunrisers Hyderabad
M. Chinnaswamy Stadium	Arun Jaitley Stadium	Rajiv Gandhi Stadium
Capacity: 35,000	Capacity: 41,000	Capacity: 55,000
Kolkata	Jaipur	Mumbai
Kolkata Knight Riders	Rajasthan Royals	Mumbai Indians
Eden Gardens	Sawai Mansingh Stadium	Wankhede Stadium
Capacity: 68,000	Capacity: 25,000	Capacity: 33,000
Mohali	Chennai	Visakhapatnam
Kings XI Punjab	Chennai Super Kings	Playoffs
IS Bindra Stadium	M. A. Chidambaram Stadium	ACA-VDCA Cricket Stadium
Capacity: 26,000	Capacity: 39,000	Capacity: 27,500

== Teams and standings ==
=== Points table ===
Pos	Team	Pld	W	L	NR	Pts	NRR	
1	Mumbai Indians (C)	14	9	5	0	18	0.421	Advanced to Qualifier 1
2	Chennai Super Kings (R)	14	9	5	0	18	0.131	Advanced to Qualifier 1
3	Delhi Capitals	14	9	5	0	18	0.044	Advanced to the Eliminator
4	Sunrisers Hyderabad	14	6	8	0	12	0.577	Advanced to the Eliminator
5	Kolkata Knight Riders	14	6	8	0	12	0.028	
6	Kings XI Punjab	14	6	8	0	12	−0.251	
7	Rajasthan Royals	14	5	8	1	11	−0.449	
8	Royal Challengers Bangalore	14	5	8	1	11	−0.607	

Source: ESPNCricinfo
The four top ranked teams qualify for the playoffs

("C" refers to the "Champions" of the Tournament. 'R'(Runner-up))

=== Match summary ===
Team	Group matches														Playoffs			
Team	1	2	3	4	5	6	7	8	9	10	11	12	13	14	Q1	E	Q2	F
Chennai Super Kings	2	4	6	6	8	10	12	14	14	14	16	16	18	18	L		W	L
Delhi Capitals	2	2	4	4	4	6	8	10	10	12	14	16	16	18		W	L	
Kings XI Punjab	2	2	4	6	6	8	8	8	10	10	10	10	10	12				
Kolkata Knight Riders	2	4	4	6	8	8	8	8	8	8	8	10	12	12				
Mumbai Indians	0	2	2	4	6	8	8	10	12	12	14	14	16	18	W			W
Rajasthan Royals	0	0	0	2	2	2	4	4	6	6	8	10	11	11				
Royal Challengers Bengaluru	0	0	0	0	0	0	2	2	4	6	8	8	9	11				
Sunrisers Hyderabad	0	2	4	6	6	6	6	8	10	10	10	12	12	12		L		

Win	Loss	No result

- Note: The total points at the end of each group match are listed.
- Note: Click on the points (group matches) or W/L (playoffs) to see the match summary.

Visitor team →	CSK	DC	KXIP	KKR	MI	RR	RCB	SRH
Home team ↓	CSK	DC	KXIP	KKR	MI	RR	RCB	SRH
Chennai Super Kings		Chennai; 80 runs	Chennai; 22 runs	Chennai; 7 wickets	Mumbai; 46 runs	Chennai; 8 runs	Chennai; 7 wickets	Chennai; 6 wickets
Delhi Capitals	Chennai; 6 wickets		Delhi; 5 wickets	Delhi; Super Over	Mumbai; 40 runs	Delhi; 5 wickets	Delhi; 16 runs	Hyderabad; 5 wickets
Kings XI Punjab	Punjab; 6 wickets	Punjab; 14 runs		Kolkata; 7 wickets	Punjab; 8 wickets	Punjab; 12 runs	Bengaluru; 8 wickets	Punjab; 6 wickets
Kolkata Knight Riders	Chennai; 5 wickets	Delhi; 7 wickets	Kolkata; 28 runs		Kolkata; 34 runs	Rajasthan; 3 wickets	Bengaluru; 10 runs	Kolkata; 6 wickets
Mumbai Indians	Mumbai; 37 runs	Delhi; 37 runs	Mumbai; 3 wickets	Mumbai; 9 wickets		Rajasthan; 4 wickets	Mumbai; 5 wickets	Mumbai; Super Over
Rajasthan Royals	Chennai; 4 wickets	Delhi; 6 wickets	Punjab; 14 runs	Kolkata; 8 wickets	Rajasthan; 5 wickets		Rajasthan; 7 wickets	Rajasthan; 7 wickets
Royal Challengers Bengaluru	Bengaluru; 1 run	Delhi; 4 wickets	Bengaluru; 17 runs	Kolkata; 5 wickets	Mumbai; 6 runs	Match abandoned		Bengaluru; 4 wickets
Sunrisers Hyderabad	Hyderabad; 6 wickets	Delhi; 39 runs	Hyderabad; 45 runs	Hyderabad; 9 wickets	Mumbai; 40 runs	Hyderabad; 5 wickets	Hyderabad; 118 runs	

Home team won	Visitor team won

- Note: Results listed are according to the home (horizontal) and visitor (vertical) teams.
- Note: Click on a result to see a summary of the match.

== League stage ==
The full schedule of the 2019 season was published on the IPL website.

=== Matches ===
23 March
20:00 (D/N)
Scorecard

Royal Challengers Bangalore; 70 (17.1 overs)	v	Chennai Super Kings (H); 71/3 (17.4 overs)
Parthiv Patel 29 (35); Imran Tahir 3/9 (4 overs)		Ambati Rayudu 28 (42); Mohammed Siraj 1/5 (2 overs)

Chennai won by 7 wickets
M. A. Chidambaram Stadium, Chennai
Umpires: Anil Dandekar (Ind) and Bruce Oxenford (Aus)
Player of the match: Harbhajan Singh (Chennai Super Kings)

- Chennai Super Kings won the toss and elected to field.
- Suresh Raina (Chennai Super Kings) became the first batsman to score 5,000 runs in the IPL.
- Royal Challengers Bangalore made the lowest total for any team in the IPL against the Chennai Super Kings.

24 March
16:00 (D/N)
Scorecard

Sunrisers Hyderabad; 181/3 (20 overs)	v	Kolkata Knight Riders (H); 183/4 (19.4 overs)
David Warner 85 (53); Andre Russell 2/32 (3 overs)		Nitish Rana 68 (47); Rashid Khan 1/26 (4 overs)

Kolkata won by 6 wickets
Eden Gardens, Kolkata
Umpires: Anil Chaudhary (Ind) and Chris Gaffaney (NZ)
Player of the match: Andre Russell (Kolkata Knight Riders)

- Kolkata Knight Riders won the toss and elected to field.

24 March
20:00 (D/N)
Scorecard

Delhi Capitals; 213/6 (20 overs)	v	Mumbai Indians (H); 176 (19.2 overs)
Rishabh Pant 78* (27); Mitchell McClenaghan 3/40 (4 overs)		Yuvraj Singh 53 (35); Kagiso Rabada 2/23 (4 overs)

Delhi won by 37 runs
Wankhede Stadium, Mumbai
Umpires: Yeshwant Barde (Ind) and Sundaram Ravi (Ind)
Player of the match: Rishabh Pant (Delhi Capitals)

- Mumbai Indians won the toss and elected to field.

25 March
20:00 (D/N)
Scorecard

Kings XI Punjab; 184/4 (20 overs)	v	Rajasthan Royals (H); 170/9 (20 overs)
Chris Gayle 79 (47); Ben Stokes 2/48 (4 overs)		Jos Buttler 69 (43); Mujeeb Ur Rahman 2/31 (4 overs)

Punjab won by 14 runs
Sawai Mansingh Stadium, Jaipur
Umpires: K. N. Ananthapadmanabhan (Ind) and Chettithody Shamshuddin (Ind)
Player of the match: Chris Gayle (Kings XI Punjab)

- Rajasthan Royals won the toss and elected to field.
- Jos Buttler (Rajasthan Royals) was dismissed by Mankading.

26 March
20:00 (D/N)
Scorecard

(H) Delhi Capitals; 147/6 (20 overs)	v	Chennai Super Kings; 150/4 (19.4 overs)
Shikhar Dhawan 51 (47); Dwayne Bravo 3/33 (4 overs)		Shane Watson 44 (26); Amit Mishra 2/35 (4 overs)

Chennai won by 6 wickets
Feroz Shah Kotla Ground, Delhi
Umpires: Marais Erasmus (SA) and Nitin Menon (Ind)
Player of the match: Shane Watson (Chennai Super Kings)

- Delhi Capitals won the toss and elected to bat.

27 March
20:00 (D/N)
Scorecard

(H) Kolkata Knight Riders; 218/4 (20 overs)	v	Kings XI Punjab; 190/4 (20 overs)
Robin Uthappa 67* (50); Varun Chakravarthy 1/35 (3 overs)		David Miller 59* (40); Andre Russell 2/21 (3 overs)

Kolkata won by 28 runs
Eden Gardens, Kolkata
Umpires: Anil Chaudhary (Ind) and Vineet Kulkarni (Ind)
Player of the match: Andre Russell (Kolkata Knight Riders)

- Kings XI Punjab won the toss and elected to field.
- Varun Chakravarthy (Kings XI Punjab) made his T20 debut. His first over went for 25 runs, the highest number of runs conceded by a bowler on debut in the IPL.
- Sunil Narine (Kolkata Knight Riders) played in his 100th IPL match.
- Kolkata Knight Riders made their highest total at home in the IPL.

28 March
20:00 (D/N)
Scorecard

Mumbai Indians; 187/8 (20 overs)	v	Royal Challengers Bangalore (H); 181/5 (20 overs)
Rohit Sharma 48 (33); Yuzvendra Chahal 4/38 (4 overs)		AB de Villiers 70* (41); Jasprit Bumrah 3/20 (4 overs)

Mumbai won by 6 runs
M. Chinnaswamy Stadium, Bengaluru
Umpires: C. K. Nandan (Ind) and Sundaram Ravi (Ind)
Player of the match: Jasprit Bumrah (Mumbai Indians)

- Royal Challengers Bangalore won the toss and elected to field.
- Virat Kohli (Royal Challengers Bangalore) became the second batsman to score 5,000 runs in the IPL.

29 March
20:00 (D/N)
Scorecard

Rajasthan Royals; 198/2 (20 overs)	v	Sunrisers Hyderabad (H); 201/5 (19 overs)
Sanju Samson 102* (55); Rashid Khan 1/24 (4 overs)		David Warner 69 (37); Shreyas Gopal 3/27 (4 overs)

Hyderabad won by 5 wickets
Rajiv Gandhi International Cricket Stadium, Hyderabad
Umpires: Bruce Oxenford (Aus) and Chettithody Shamshuddin (Ind)
Player of the match: Rashid Khan (Sunrisers Hyderabad)

- Rajasthan Royals won the toss and elected to bat.
- This was Sunrisers Hyderabad's highest successful run chase in the IPL.

30 March
16:00 (D/N)
Scorecard

Mumbai Indians; 176/7 (20 overs)	v	Kings XI Punjab (H); 177/2 (18.4 overs)
Quinton de Kock 60 (39); Murugan Ashwin 2/25 (4 overs)		K. L. Rahul 71* (57); Krunal Pandya 2/43 (4 overs)

Punjab won by 8 wickets
Punjab Cricket Association IS Bindra Stadium, Mohali
Umpires: Chris Gaffaney (NZ) and Vineet Kulkarni (Ind)
Player of the match: Mayank Agarwal (Kings XI Punjab)

- Kings XI Punjab won the toss and elected to field.

30 March
20:00 (D/N)
Scorecard

Kolkata Knight Riders; 185/8 (20 overs)	v	Delhi Capitals (H); 185/6 (20 overs)
Andre Russell 62 (28); Harshal Patel 2/40 (4 overs)		Prithvi Shaw 99 (55); Kuldeep Yadav 2/41 (4 overs)

Match tied (Delhi won the Super Over)
Feroz Shah Kotla Ground, Delhi
Umpires: Anil Dandekar (Ind) and Nitin Menon (Ind)
Player of the match: Prithvi Shaw (Delhi Capitals)

- Delhi Capitals won the toss and elected to field.

31 March
16:00 (D/N)
Scorecard

(H) Sunrisers Hyderabad; 231/2 (20 overs)	v	Royal Challengers Bangalore; 113 (19.5 overs)
Jonny Bairstow 114 (56); Yuzvendra Chahal 1/44 (4 overs)		Colin de Grandhomme 37 (32); Mohammad Nabi 4/11 (4 overs)

Hyderabad won by 118 runs
Rajiv Gandhi International Cricket Stadium, Hyderabad
Umpires: K. N. Ananthapadmanabhan (Ind) and Sundaram Ravi (Ind)
Player of the match: Jonny Bairstow (Sunrisers Hyderabad)

- Royal Challengers Bangalore won the toss and elected to field.
- David Warner and Jonny Bairstow (Sunrisers Hyderabad) recorded the highest first-wicket partnership in the IPL (185 runs).
- Sunrisers Hyderabad recorded their highest total in the IPL.
- This was the largest winning margin for Sunrisers Hyderabad in terms of runs, and the second-largest defeat for Royal Challengers Bangalore in terms of runs.
- It was the second instance of two batsmen scoring hundreds in the same match in the IPL, and the fourth overall instance in a T20 match.
- Mohammad Nabi recorded the second-best bowling figures for Sunrisers Hyderabad in the IPL.

31 March
20:00 (D/N)
Scorecard

(H) Chennai Super Kings; 175/5 (20 overs)	v	Rajasthan Royals; 167/8 (20 overs)
MS Dhoni 75* (46); Jofra Archer 2/17 (4 overs)		Ben Stokes 46 (26); Deepak Chahar 2/19 (4 overs)

Chennai won by 8 runs
M. A. Chidambaram Stadium, Chennai
Umpires: Yeshwant Barde (Ind) and C. K. Nandan (Ind)
Player of the match: MS Dhoni (Chennai Super Kings)

- Rajasthan Royals won the toss and elected to field.

1 April
20:00 (D/N)
Scorecard

(H) Kings XI Punjab; 166/9 (20 overs)	v	Delhi Capitals; 152 (19.2 overs)
David Miller 43 (30); Chris Morris 3/30 (4 overs)		Rishabh Pant 39 (26); Sam Curran 4/11 (2.2 overs)

Punjab won by 14 runs
Punjab Cricket Association IS Bindra Stadium, Mohali
Umpires: Anil Chaudhary (Ind) and Chris Gaffaney (NZ)
Player of the match: Sam Curran (Kings XI Punjab)

- Delhi Capitals won the toss and elected to field.
- Sam Curran (Kings XI Punjab) took a hat-trick.

2 April
20:00 (D/N)
Scorecard

Royal Challengers Bangalore; 158/4 (20 overs)	v	Rajasthan Royals (H); 164/3 (19.5 overs)
Parthiv Patel 67 (41); Shreyas Gopal 3/12 (4 overs)		Jos Buttler 59 (43); Yuzvendra Chahal 2/17 (4 overs)

Rajasthan won by 7 wickets
Sawai Mansingh Stadium, Jaipur
Umpires: Anil Dandekar (Ind) and Marais Erasmus (SA)
Player of the match: Shreyas Gopal (Rajasthan Royals)

- Rajasthan Royals won the toss and elected to field.
- Virat Kohli (Royal Challengers Bangalore) played in his 100th IPL match as captain.

3 April
20:00 (D/N)
Scorecard

(H) Mumbai Indians; 170/5 (20 overs)	v	Chennai Super Kings; 133/8 (20 overs)
Suryakumar Yadav 59 (43); Ravindra Jadeja 1/10 (2 overs)		Kedar Jadhav 58 (54); Hardik Pandya 3/20 (4 overs)

Mumbai won by 37 runs
Wankhede Stadium, Mumbai
Umpires: Bruce Oxenford (Aus) and Rod Tucker (Aus)
Player of the match: Hardik Pandya (Mumbai Indians)

- Chennai Super Kings won the toss and elected to field.
- Mumbai Indians became the first team in the IPL to win 100 matches.

4 April
20:00 (D/N)
Scorecard

(H) Delhi Capitals; 129/8 (20 overs)	v	Sunrisers Hyderabad; 131/5 (18.3 overs)
Shreyas Iyer 43 (41); Mohammad Nabi 2/21 (4 overs)		Jonny Bairstow 48 (28); Ishant Sharma 1/5 (1 over)

Hyderabad won by 5 wickets
Feroz Shah Kotla Ground, Delhi
Umpires: K. N. Ananthapadmanabhan (Ind) and Chettithody Shamshuddin (Ind)
Player of the match: Jonny Bairstow (Sunrisers Hyderabad)

- Sunrisers Hyderabad won the toss and elected to field.

5 April
20:00 (D/N)
Scorecard

(H) Royal Challengers Bangalore; 205/3 (20 overs)	v	Kolkata Knight Riders; 206/5 (19.1 overs)
Virat Kohli 84 (49); Nitish Rana 1/22 (2 overs)		Andre Russell 48* (13); Pawan Negi 2/21 (3.1 overs)

Kolkata won by 5 wickets
M. Chinnaswamy Stadium, Bengaluru
Umpires: Anil Chaudhary (Ind) and Chris Gaffaney (NZ)
Player of the match: Andre Russell (Kolkata Knight Riders)

- Kolkata Knight Riders won the toss and elected to field.

6 April 2019
16:00 (D/N)
Scorecard

(H) Chennai Super Kings; 160/3 (20 overs)	v	Kings XI Punjab; 138/5 (20 overs)
Faf du Plessis 54 (38); Ravichandran Ashwin 3/23 (4 overs)		Sarfaraz Khan 67 (59); Harbhajan Singh 2/17 (4 overs)

Chennai won by 22 runs
M. A. Chidambaram Stadium, Chennai
Umpires: K. N. Ananthapadmanabhan (Ind) and Rod Tucker (Aus)
Player of the match: Harbhajan Singh (Chennai Super Kings)

- Chennai Super Kings won the toss and elected to bat.

6 April
20:00 (D/N)
Scorecard

Mumbai Indians; 136/7 (20 overs)	v	Sunrisers Hyderabad (H); 96 (17.4 overs)
Kieron Pollard 46* (26); Siddarth Kaul 2/34 (4 overs)		Deepak Hooda 20 (24); Alzarri Joseph 6/12 (3.4 overs)

Mumbai won by 40 runs
Rajiv Gandhi International Cricket Stadium, Hyderabad
Umpires: Anil Dandekar (Ind) and Nitin Menon (Ind)
Player of the match: Alzarri Joseph (Mumbai Indians)

- Sunrisers Hyderabad won the toss and elected to field.
- Alzarri Joseph (Mumbai Indians) took the best bowling figures in the IPL.

7 April
16:00 (D/N)
Scorecard

(H) Royal Challengers Bangalore; 149/8 (20 overs)	v	Delhi Capitals; 152/6 (18.5 overs)
Virat Kohli 41 (33); Kagiso Rabada 4/21 (4 overs)		Shreyas Iyer 67 (50); Navdeep Saini 2/24 (4 overs)

Delhi won by 4 wickets
M. Chinnaswamy Stadium, Bengaluru
Umpires: Yeshwant Barde (Ind) and Sundaram Ravi (Ind)
Player of the match: Kagiso Rabada (Delhi Capitals)

- Delhi Capitals won the toss and elected to field.

7 April
20:00 (D/N)
Scorecard

(H) Rajasthan Royals; 139/3 (20 overs)	v	Kolkata Knight Riders; 140/2 (13.5 overs)
Steve Smith 73* (59); Harry Gurney 2/25 (4 overs)		Chris Lynn 50 (32); Shreyas Gopal 2/35 (4 overs)

Kolkata won by 8 wickets
Sawai Mansingh Stadium, Jaipur
Umpires: Anil Chaudhary (Ind) and Chris Gaffaney (NZ)
Player of the match: Harry Gurney (Kolkata Knight Riders)

- Kolkata Knight Riders won the toss and elected to field.

8 April
20:00 (D/N)
Scorecard

Sunrisers Hyderabad; 150/4 (20 overs)	v	Kings XI Punjab (H); 151/4 (19.5 overs)
David Warner 70* (62); Mohammed Shami 1/30 (4 overs); Ravichandran Ashwin 1/30 (4 overs)		K. L. Rahul 71* (53); Sandeep Sharma 2/21 (4 overs)

Punjab won by 6 wickets
Punjab Cricket Association IS Bindra Stadium, Mohali
Umpires: Anil Dandekar (Ind) and Marais Erasmus (SA)
Player of the match: K. L. Rahul (Kings XI Punjab)

- Kings XI Punjab won the toss and elected to field.

9 April
20:00 (D/N)
Scorecard

Kolkata Knight Riders; 108/9 (20 overs)	v	Chennai Super Kings (H); 111/3 (17.2 overs)
Andre Russell 50* (44); Deepak Chahar 3/20 (4 overs)		Faf du Plessis 43* (45); Sunil Narine 2/24 (3.2 overs)

Chennai won by 7 wickets
M. A. Chidambaram Stadium, Chennai
Umpires: Chettithody Shamshuddin (Ind) and Rod Tucker (Aus)
Player of the match: Deepak Chahar (Chennai Super Kings)

- Chennai Super Kings won the toss and elected to field.

10 April
20:00 (D/N)
Scorecard

Kings XI Punjab; 197/4 (20 overs)	v	Mumbai Indians (H); 198/7 (20 overs)
K. L. Rahul 100* (64); Hardik Pandya 2/57 (4 overs)		Kieron Pollard 83 (31); Mohammed Shami 3/21 (4 overs)

Mumbai won by 3 wickets
Wankhede Stadium, Mumbai
Umpires: Yeshwant Barde (Ind) and Sundaram Ravi (Ind)
Player of the match: Kieron Pollard (Mumbai Indians)

- Mumbai Indians won the toss and elected to field.
- K. L. Rahul (Kings XI Punjab) scored his first century in the IPL.
- Mumbai Indians recorded their highest ever successful run chase in the IPL.

11 April
20:00 (D/N)
Scorecard

(H) Rajasthan Royals; 151/7 (20 overs)	v	Chennai Super Kings; 155/6 (20 overs)
Ben Stokes 28 (26); Ravindra Jadeja 2/20 (4 overs)		MS Dhoni 58 (43); Ben Stokes 2/39 (3 overs)

Chennai won by 4 wickets
Sawai Mansingh Stadium, Jaipur
Umpires: Ulhas Gandhe (Ind) and Bruce Oxenford (Aus)
Player of the match: MS Dhoni (Chennai Super Kings)

- Chennai Super Kings won the toss and elected to field.

12 April
20:00 (D/N)
Scorecard

(H) Kolkata Knight Riders; 178/7 (20 overs)	v	Delhi Capitals; 180/3 (18.5 overs)
Shubman Gill 65 (39); Chris Morris 2/38 (4 overs)		Shikhar Dhawan 97* (63); Nitish Rana 1/12 (2 overs)

Delhi won by 7 wickets
Eden Gardens, Kolkata
Umpires: Yeshwant Barde (Ind) and C. K. Nandan (Ind)
Player of the match: Shikhar Dhawan (Delhi Capitals)

- Delhi Capitals won the toss and elected to field.

13 April
16:00 (D/N)
Scorecard

(H) Mumbai Indians; 187/5 (20 overs)	v	Rajasthan Royals; 188/6 (19.3 overs)
Quinton de Kock 81 (52); Jofra Archer 3/39 (4 overs)		Jos Buttler 89 (43); Krunal Pandya 3/34 (4 overs)

Rajasthan won by 4 wickets
Wankhede Stadium, Mumbai
Umpires: Nand Kishore (Ind) and Nitin Menon (Ind)
Player of the match: Jos Buttler (Rajasthan Royals)

- Rajasthan Royals won the toss and elected to field.

13 April
20:00 (D/N)
Scorecard

(H) Kings XI Punjab; 173/4 (20 overs)	v	Royal Challengers Bangalore; 174/2 (19.2 overs)
Chris Gayle 99* (64); Yuzvendra Chahal 2/33 (4 overs)		Virat Kohli 67 (53); Ravichandran Ashwin 1/30 (4 overs)

Bangalore won by 8 wickets
Punjab Cricket Association IS Bindra Stadium, Mohali
Umpires: Ulhas Gandhe (Ind) and Sundaram Ravi (Ind)
Player of the match: AB de Villiers (Royal Challengers Bangalore)

- Royal Challengers Bangalore won the toss and elected to field.

14 April
16:00 (D/N)
Scorecard

(H) Kolkata Knight Riders; 161/8 (20 overs)	v	Chennai Super Kings; 162/5 (19.4 overs)
Chris Lynn 82 (51); Imran Tahir 4/27 (4 overs)		Suresh Raina 58* (42); Sunil Narine 2/19 (4 overs)

Chennai won by 5 wickets
Eden Gardens, Kolkata
Umpires: C. K. Nandan (Ind) and Rod Tucker (Aus)
Player of the match: Imran Tahir (Chennai Super Kings)

- Chennai Super Kings won the toss and elected to field.

14 April
20:00 (D/N)
Scorecard

Delhi Capitals; 155/7 (20 overs)	v	Sunrisers Hyderabad (H); 116 (18.5 overs)
Shreyas Iyer 45 (40); Khaleel Ahmed 3/30 (4 overs)		David Warner 51 (47); Kagiso Rabada 4/22 (3.5 overs)

Delhi won by 39 runs
Rajiv Gandhi International Cricket Stadium, Hyderabad
Umpires: Anil Chaudhary (Ind) and Bruce Oxenford (Aus)
Player of the match: Keemo Paul (Delhi Capitals)

- Sunrisers Hyderabad won the toss and elected to field. Sunrisers Hyderabad played their 100th IPL match.
- Bhuvneshwar Kumar took his 100th wicket in the IPL and became the first bowler to take 100 wickets for the Sunrisers Hyderabad.

15 April
20:00 (D/N)
Scorecard

Royal Challengers Bangalore; 171/7 (20 overs)	v	Mumbai Indians (H); 172/5 (19 overs)
AB de Villiers 75 (51); Lasith Malinga 4/31 (4 overs)		Quinton de Kock 40 (26); Moeen Ali 2/18 (4 overs)

Mumbai won by 5 wickets
Wankhede Stadium, Mumbai
Umpires: Marais Erasmus (SA) and Nitin Menon (Ind)
Player of the match: Lasith Malinga (Mumbai Indians

- Mumbai Indians won the toss and elected to field.

16 April
20:00 (D/N)
Scorecard

(H) Kings XI Punjab; 182/6 (20 overs)	v	Rajasthan Royals; 170/7 (20 overs)
K. L. Rahul 52 (47); Jofra Archer 3/15 (4 overs)		Rahul Tripathi 50 (45); Ravichandran Ashwin 2/24 (4 overs)

Punjab won by 12 runs
Punjab Cricket Association IS Bindra Stadium, Mohali
Umpires: Anil Chaudhary (Ind) and Vineet Kulkarni (Ind)
Player of the match: Ravichandran Ashwin (Kings Xi Punjab)

- Rajasthan Royals won the toss and elected to field.
- Arshdeep Singh (Kings XI Punjab) made his T20 debut.

17 April
20:00 (D/N)
Scorecard

Chennai Super Kings; 132/5 (20 overs)	v	Sunrisers Hyderabad (H); 137/4 (16.5 overs)
Faf du Plessis 45 (31); Rashid Khan 2/17 (4 overs)		Jonny Bairstow 61* (44); Imran Tahir 2/20 (4 overs)

Hyderabad won by 6 wickets
Rajiv Gandhi International Cricket Stadium, Hyderabad
Umpires: Ulhas Gandhe (Ind) and Ian Gould (Eng)
Player of the match: David Warner (Sunrisers Hyderabad)

- Chennai Super Kings won the toss and elected to bat.

18 April
20:00 (D/N)
Scorecard

Mumbai Indians; 168/5 (20 overs)	v	Delhi Capitals (H); 128/9 (20 overs)
Krunal Pandya 37* (26); Kagiso Rabada 2/38 (4 overs)		Shikhar Dhawan 35 (22); Rahul Chahar 3/19 (4 overs)

Mumbai won by 40 runs
Feroz Shah Kotla Ground, Delhi
Umpires: Nigel Llong (Eng) and Bruce Oxenford (Aus)
Player of the match: Hardik Pandya (Mumbai Indians)

- Mumbai Indians won the toss and elected to bat.

19 April
20:00 (D/N)
Scorecard

Royal Challengers Bangalore; 213/4 (20 overs)	v	Kolkata Knight Riders (H); 203/5 (20 overs)
Virat Kohli 100 (58); Andre Russell 1/17 (3 overs)		Nitish Rana 85* (46); Dale Steyn 2/40 (4 overs)

Bangalore won by 10 runs
Eden Gardens, Kolkata
Umpires: Ian Gould (Eng) and Nitin Menon (Ind)
Player of the match: Virat Kohli (Royal Challengers Bangalore)

- Kolkata Knight Riders won the toss and elected to field.

20 April
16:00 (D/N)
Scorecard

Mumbai Indians; 161/5 (20 overs)	v	Rajasthan Royals (H); 162/5 (19.1 overs)
Quinton de Kock 65 (47); Shreyas Gopal 2/21 (4 overs)		Steve Smith 59* (48); Rahul Chahar 3/29 (4 overs)

Rajasthan won by 5 wickets
Sawai Mansingh Stadium, Jaipur
Umpires: Yeshwant Barde (Ind) and Sundaram Ravi (Ind)
Player of the match: Steve Smith (Rajasthan Royals)

- Rajasthan Royals won the toss and elected to field.

20 April
20:00 (D/N)
Scorecard

Kings XI Punjab; 163/7 (20 overs)	v	Delhi Capitals (H); 166/5 (19.4 overs)
Chris Gayle 69 (37); Sandeep Lamichhane 3/40 (4 overs)		Shreyas Iyer 58* (49); Hardus Viljoen 2/39 (4 overs)

Delhi won by 5 wickets
Feroz Shah Kotla Ground, Delhi
Umpires: Ulhas Gandhe (Ind) and Chettithody Shamshuddin (Ind)
Player of the match: Shreyas Iyer (Delhi Capitals)

- Delhi Capitals won the toss and elected to field.
- Harpreet Brar (Kings XI Punjab) made his T20 debut.

21 April
16:00 (D/N)
Scorecard

Kolkata Knight Riders; 159/8 (20 overs)	v	Sunrisers Hyderabad (H); 161/1 (15 overs)
Chris Lynn 51 (47); Khaleel Ahmed 3/33 (4 overs)		Jonny Bairstow 80* (43); Prithvi Raj 1/29 (3 overs)

Hyderabad won by 9 wickets
Rajiv Gandhi International Cricket Stadium, Hyderabad
Umpires: Nigel Llong (Eng) and Nitin Menon (Ind)
Player of the match: Khaleel Ahmed (Sunrisers Hyderabad)

- Sunrisers Hyderabad won the toss and elected to field.

21 April
20:00 (D/N)
Scorecard

(H) Royal Challengers Bangalore; 161/7 (20 overs)	v	Chennai Super Kings; 160/8 (20 overs)
Parthiv Patel 53 (37); Deepak Chahar 2/25 (4 overs)		MS Dhoni 84* (48); Dale Steyn 2/29 (4 overs)

Bangalore won by 1 run
M. Chinnaswamy Stadium, Bangalore
Umpires: Vineet Kulkarni (Ind) and Rod Tucker (Aus)
Player of the match: Parthiv Patel (Royal Challengers Bangalore)

- Chennai Super Kings won the toss and elected to field.

22 April
20:00 (D/N)
Scorecard

(H) Rajasthan Royals; 191/6 (20 overs)	v	Delhi Capitals; 193/4 (19.2 overs)
Ajinkya Rahane 105* (63); Kagiso Rabada 2/37 (4 overs)		Rishabh Pant 78* (36); Shreyas Gopal 2/47 (4 overs)

Delhi won by 6 wickets
Sawai Mansingh Stadium, Jaipur
Umpires: Nand Kishore (Ind) and Sundaram Ravi (Ind)
Player of the match: Rishabh Pant (Delhi Capitals)

- Delhi Capitals won the toss and elected to field.
- Ashton Turner (Rajasthan Royals) became the first batsman to make five consecutive ducks in Twenty20 cricket.

23 April
20:00 (D/N)
Scorecard

Sunrisers Hyderabad; 175/3 (20 overs)	v	Chennai Super Kings (H); 176/4 (19.5 overs)
Manish Pandey 83* (49); Harbhajan Singh 2/39 (4 overs)		Shane Watson 96 (53); Bhuvneshwar Kumar 1/18 (4 overs)

Chennai won by 6 wickets
M. A. Chidambaram Stadium, Chennai
Umpires: Anil Chaudhary (Ind) and Nigel Llong (Eng)
Player of the match: Shane Watson (Chennai Super Kings)

- Chennai Super Kings won the toss and elected to field.

24 April
20:00 (D/N)
Scorecard

(H) Royal Challengers Bangalore; 202/4 (20 overs)	v	Kings XI Punjab; 185/7 (20 overs)
AB de Villiers 82* (44); Ravichandran Ashwin 1/15 (4 overs)		Nicholas Pooran 46 (28); Umesh Yadav 3/36 (4 overs)

Bangalore won by 17 runs
M. Chinnaswamy Stadium, Bengaluru
Umpires: Bruce Oxenford (Aus) and Chettithody Shamshuddin (Ind)
Player of the match: AB de Villiers (Royal Challengers Bangalore)

- Kings XI Punjab won the toss and elected to field.

25 April
20:00 (D/N)
Scorecard

(H) Kolkata Knight Riders; 175/6 (20 overs)	v	Rajasthan Royals; 177/7 (19.2 overs)
Dinesh Karthik 97* (50); Varun Aaron 2/20 (4 overs)		Riyan Parag 47 (31); Piyush Chawla 3/20 (4 overs)

Rajasthan won by 3 wickets
Eden Gardens, Kolkata
Umpires: Anil Dandekar (Ind) and Ian Gould (Eng)
Player of the match: Varun Aaron (Rajasthan Royals)

- Rajasthan Royals won the toss and elected to field.

26 April
20:00 (D/N)
Scorecard

Mumbai Indians; 155/4 (20 overs)	v	Chennai Super Kings (H); 109 (17.4 overs)
Rohit Sharma 67 (48); Mitchell Santner 2/13 (4 overs)		Murali Vijay 38 (35); Lasith Malinga 4/37 (3.4 overs)

Mumbai won by 46 runs
M. A. Chidambaram Stadium, Chennai
Umpires: Anil Chaudhary (Ind) and Nigel Llong (Eng)
Player of the match: Rohit Sharma (Mumbai Indians)

- Chennai Super Kings won the toss and elected to field.

27 April
20:00 (D/N)
Scorecard

Sunrisers Hyderabad; 160/8 (20 overs)	v	Rajasthan Royals (H); 161/3 (19.1 overs)
Manish Pandey 61 (36); Jaydev Unadkat 2/26 (4 overs)		Sanju Samson 48* (32); Shakib Al Hasan 1/26 (3.1 overs)

Rajasthan won by 7 wickets
Sawai Mansingh Stadium, Jaipur
Umpires: Yeshwant Barde (Ind) and Nand Kishore (Ind)
Player of the match: Jaydev Unadkat (Rajasthan Royals)

- Rajasthan Royals won the toss and elected to field.
- Chennai Super Kings qualified for the playoffs as a result of this match.

28 April
16:00 (D/N)
Scorecard

(H) Delhi Capitals; 187/5 (20 overs)	v	Royal Challengers Bangalore; 171/7 (20 overs)
Shreyas Iyer 52 (37); Yuzvendra Chahal 2/41 (4 overs)		Parthiv Patel 39 (20); Amit Mishra 2/29 (4 overs)

Delhi won by 16 runs
Feroz Shah Kotla Ground, Delhi
Umpires: K. N. Ananthapadmanabhan (Ind) and Bruce Oxenford (Aus)
Player of the match: Shikhar Dhawan (Delhi Capitals)

- Delhi Capitals won the toss and elected to bat.
- Delhi Capitals qualified for the playoffs as a result of this match.

28 April
20:00 (D/N)
Scorecard

(H) Kolkata Knight Riders; 232/2 (20 overs)	v	Mumbai Indians; 198/7 (20 overs)
Andre Russell 80* (40); Hardik Pandya 1/31 (3 overs)		Hardik Pandya 91 (34); Andre Russell 2/25 (4 overs)

Kolkata won by 34 runs
Eden Gardens, Kolkata
Umpires: Ian Gould (Eng) and Nitin Menon (Ind)
Player of the match: Andre Russell (Kolkata Knight Riders)

- Mumbai Indians won the toss and elected to field.

29 April
20:00 (D/N)
Scorecard

(H) Sunrisers Hyderabad; 212/6 (20 overs)	v	Kings XI Punjab; 167/8 (20 overs)
David Warner 81 (56); Ravichandran Ashwin 2/30 (4 overs)		K. L. Rahul 79 (56); Rashid Khan 3/21 (4 overs)

Hyderabad won by 45 runs
Rajiv Gandhi International Cricket Stadium, Hyderabad
Umpires: C. K. Nandan (Ind) and Sundaram Ravi (Ind)
Player of the match: David Warner (Sunrisers Hyderabad)

- Kings XI Punjab won the toss and elected to field.

30 April
20:00 (D/N)
Scorecard

(H) Royal Challengers Bangalore; 62/7 (5 overs)	v	Rajasthan Royals; 41/1 (3.2 overs)
Virat Kohli 25 (7); Shreyas Gopal 3/12 (1 over)		Sanju Samson 28 (13); Yuzvendra Chahal 1/0 (0.2 overs)

No result
M. Chinnaswamy Stadium, Bengaluru
Umpires: Ulhas Gandhe (Ind) and Nigel Llong (Eng)

- Rajasthan Royals won the toss and elected to field.
- The match was reduced to 5 overs per side due to rain.
- Royal Challengers Bangalore were eliminated as a result of this match.
- Shreyas Gopal (Rajasthan Royals) took a hat-trick.

1 May
20:00 (D/N)
Scorecard

(H) Chennai Super Kings; 179/4 (20 overs)	v	Delhi Capitals; 99 (16.2 overs)
Suresh Raina 59 (37); Jagadeesha Suchith 2/28 (4 overs)		Shreyas Iyer 44 (31); Imran Tahir 4/12 (3.2 overs)

Chennai won by 80 runs
M. A. Chidambaram Stadium, Chennai
Umpires: Anil Dandekar (Ind) and Nitin Menon (Ind)
Player of the match: MS Dhoni (Chennai Super Kings)

- Delhi Capitals won the toss and elected to field.

2 May
20:00 (D/N)
Scorecard

(H) Mumbai Indians; 162/5 (20 overs)	v	Sunrisers Hyderabad; 162/6 (20 overs)
Quinton de Kock 69* (58); Khaleel Ahmed 3/42 (4 overs)		Manish Pandey 71* (47); Hardik Pandya 2/20 (2 overs)

Match tied (Mumbai won the Super Over)
Wankhede Stadium, Mumbai
Umpires: C. K. Nandan (Ind) and Sundaram Ravi (Ind)
Player of the match: Jasprit Bumrah (Mumbai Indians)

- Mumbai Indians won the toss and elected to bat.
- Mumbai Indians qualified for the playoffs as a result of this match.

3 May
20:00 (D/N)
Scorecard

(H) Kings XI Punjab; 183/6 (20 overs)	v	Kolkata Knight Riders; 185/3 (18 overs)
Sam Curran 55* (24); Sandeep Warrier 2/31 (4 overs)		Shubman Gill 65* (49); Mohammed Shami 1/15 (3 overs)

Kolkata won by 7 wickets
Punjab Cricket Association IS Bindra Stadium, Mohali
Umpires: Bruce Oxenford (Aus) and Chettithody Shamshuddin (Ind)
Player of the match: Shubman Gill (Kolkata Knight Riders)

- Kolkata Knight Riders won the toss and elected to field.

4 May
16:00 (D/N)
Scorecard

Rajasthan Royals; 115/9 (20 overs)	v	Delhi Capitals (H); 121/5 (16.1 overs)
Riyan Parag 50 (49); Amit Mishra 3/17 (4 overs)		Rishabh Pant 53* (38); Ish Sodhi 3/26 (3.1 overs)

Delhi won by 5 wickets
Feroz Shah Kotla, Delhi
Umpires: Anil Dandekar (Ind) and Ian Gould (Eng)
Player of the match: Amit Mishra (Delhi Capitals)

- Rajasthan Royals won the toss and elected to bat.
- Rajasthan Royals were eliminated as a result of this match.

4 May
20:00 (D/N)
Scorecard

Sunrisers Hyderabad; 175/7 (20 overs)	v	Royal Challengers Bangalore (H); 178/6 (19.2 overs)
Kane Williamson 70* (43); Washington Sundar 3/24 (3 overs)		Shimron Hetmyer 75 (47); Khaleel Ahmed 3/37 (4 overs)

Bangalore won by 4 wickets
M. Chinnaswamy Stadium, Bengaluru
Umpires: Anil Chaudhary (Ind) and Nigel Llong (Eng)
Player of the match: Shimron Hetmyer (Royal Challengers Bangalore)

- Royal Challengers Bangalore won the toss and elected to field.

5 May
16:00 (D/N)
Scorecard

Chennai Super Kings; 170/5 (20 overs)	v	Kings XI Punjab (H); 173/4 (18 overs)
Faf du Plessis 96 (55); Sam Curran 3/35 (4 overs)		K. L. Rahul 71 (36); Harbhajan Singh 3/57 (4 overs)

Punjab won by 6 wickets
Punjab Cricket Association IS Bindra Stadium, Mohali
Umpires: K. N. Ananthapadmanabhan (Ind) and Chettithody Shamshuddin (Ind)
Player of the match: K. L. Rahul (Kings XI Punjab)

- Kings XI Punjab won the toss and elected to field.
- Kings XI Punjab were eliminated and Chennai Super Kings advanced to Qualifier 1 as a result of this match.

5 May
20:00 (D/N)
Scorecard

Kolkata Knight Riders; 133/7 (20 overs)	v	Mumbai Indians (H); 134/1 (16.1 overs)
Chris Lynn 41 (29); Lasith Malinga 3/35 (4 overs)		Rohit Sharma 55* (48); Prasidh Krishna 1/22 (3 overs)

Mumbai won by 9 wickets
Wankhede Stadium, Mumbai
Umpires: Nand Kishore (Ind) and C. K. Nandan (Ind)
Player of the match: Hardik Pandya (Mumbai Indians)

- Mumbai Indians won the toss and elected to field.
- Sunrisers Hyderabad qualified for the playoffs, becoming the first team ever to qualify with only 12 points, Kolkata Knight Riders were eliminated and Mumbai Indians advanced to Qualifier 1 as a result of this match.

== Playoffs ==
Qualifier 1 / Eliminator
7 May — Chennai
1	Mumbai Indians	132/4 (18.3 overs)
2	Chennai Super Kings	131/4 (20 overs)
8 May — Visakhapatnam
3	Delhi Capitals	165/8 (19.5 overs)
4	Sunrisers Hyderabad	162/8 (20 overs)

Qualifier 2
10 May — Visakhapatnam
Q1L	Chennai Super Kings	151/4 (19 overs)
EW	Delhi Capitals	147/9 (20 overs)

Final
12 May — Hyderabad
Q1W	Mumbai Indians	149/8 (20 overs)
Q2W	Chennai Super Kings	148/7 (20 overs)

=== Qualifier 1 ===
7 May
19:30 (D/N)
Scorecard

Chennai Super Kings; 131/4 (20 overs)	v	Mumbai Indians; 132/4 (18.3 overs)
Ambati Rayudu 42* (37); Rahul Chahar 2/14 (4 overs)		Suryakumar Yadav 71* (54); Imran Tahir 2/33 (4 overs)

Mumbai Indians won by 6 wickets
M. A. Chidambaram Stadium, Chennai
Umpires: Nigel Llong (Eng) and Nitin Menon (Ind)
Player of the match: Suryakumar Yadav (Mumbai Indians)

- Chennai Super Kings won the toss and elected to bat.

=== Eliminator ===
8 May
19:30 (D/N)
Scorecard

Sunrisers Hyderabad; 162/8 (20 overs)	v	Delhi Capitals; 165/8 (19.5 overs)
Martin Guptill 36 (19); Keemo Paul 3/32 (4 overs)		Prithvi Shaw 56 (38); Rashid Khan 2/15 (4 overs)

Delhi Capitals won by 2 wickets
Dr. Y. S. Rajasekhara Reddy ACA–VDCA Cricket Stadium, Visakhapatnam
Umpires: Bruce Oxenford (Aus) and Sundaram Ravi (Ind)
Player of the match: Rishabh Pant (Delhi Capitals)

- Delhi Capitals won the toss and elected to field.

=== Qualifier 2 ===
10 May
19:30 (D/N)
Scorecard

Delhi Capitals; 147/9 (20 overs)	v	Chennai Super Kings; 151/4 (19 overs)
Rishabh Pant 38 (25); Dwayne Bravo 2/19 (4 overs)		Shane Watson 50 (32); Trent Boult 1/20 (4 overs)

Chennai Super Kings won by 6 wickets
Dr. Y. S. Rajasekhara Reddy ACA–VDCA Cricket Stadium, Visakhapatnam
Umpires: Bruce Oxenford (Aus) and Sundaram Ravi (Ind)
Player of the match: Faf du Plessis (Chennai Super Kings)

- Chennai Super Kings won the toss and elected to field.

=== Final ===
12 May
19:30 (D/N)
Scorecard

Mumbai Indians; 149/8 (20 overs)	v	Chennai Super Kings; 148/7 (20 overs)
Kieron Pollard 41* (25); Deepak Chahar 3/26 (4 overs)		Shane Watson 80 (59); Jasprit Bumrah 2/14 (4 overs)

Mumbai Indians won by 1 run
Rajiv Gandhi International Cricket Stadium, Hyderabad
Umpires: Ian Gould (Eng) and Nitin Menon (Ind)
Player of the match: Jasprit Bumrah (Mumbai Indians)

- Mumbai Indians won the toss and elected to bat.

== Statistics ==
=== Most runs ===
Player	Team	Mat	Inns	Runs	HS
David Warner	Sunrisers Hyderabad	12	12	692	100*
K. L. Rahul	Kings XI Punjab	14	14	593	100*
Quinton de Kock	Mumbai Indians	16	16	529	81
Shikhar Dhawan	Delhi Capitals	16	16	521	97*
Andre Russell	Kolkata Knight Riders	14	13	510	80*

- Source: ESPNcricinfo
- David Warner of Sunrisers Hyderabad received the Orange Cap.

=== Most wickets ===
Player	Team	Mat	Inns	Wkts	BBI
Imran Tahir	Chennai Super Kings	17	17	26	4/12
Kagiso Rabada	Delhi Capitals	12	12	25	4/21
Deepak Chahar	Chennai Super Kings	17	17	22	3/20
Shreyas Gopal	Rajasthan Royals	14	14	20	3/12
Khaleel Ahmed	Sunrisers Hyderabad	9	9	19	3/30

- Source: ESPNcricinfo
- Imran Tahir of Chennai Super Kings received the Purple Cap.

=== End of the season awards ===
Player	Team	Award	Value
Shubman Gill	Kolkata Knight Riders	Emerging Player	₹10 lakh (US$10,000)
	Sunrisers Hyderabad	Fairplay Award	Team trophy
Kieron Pollard	Mumbai Indians	Catch of the season	₹10 lakh (US$10,000) and a phone
Andre Russell	Kolkata Knight Riders	Super striker	₹10 lakh (US$10,000) and a car
K. L. Rahul	Kings XI Punjab	Stylish player	₹10 lakh (US$10,000)
Imran Tahir	Chennai Super Kings	Most wickets	₹10 lakh (US$10,000)
David Warner	Sunrisers Hyderabad	Most runs	₹10 lakh (US$10,000)
Andre Russell	Kolkata Knight Riders	Most Valuable Player	₹10 lakh (US$10,000)

== Controversies ==
=== Betting allegations ===
On 14 May 2022, the Central Bureau of Investigation filed cases on three people–one from Delhi and two from Hyderabad–in connection with betting and alleged fixing of 2019 IPL matches. According to the first information report, the CBI received information that "a network of individuals involved in cricket betting were influencing the outcome of IPL based on inputs from Pakistan".

== See also ==
- 2019 Women's T20 Challenge
