= 2019 Kings XI Punjab season =

Indian Premier League cricket team season

Kings XI Punjab
2019 season
- Coach: Mike Hesson
- Captain: Ravichandran Ashwin
- Ground(s): Punjab Cricket Association IS Bindra Stadium, Mohali
- 2019 Indian Premier League: 6th
- Most runs: K. L. Rahul (593)
- Most wickets: Mohammed Shami (19)

The 2019 season was the 12th season for the Indian Premier League franchise Kings XI Punjab. They were one of the eight teams that competed in the 2019 Indian Premier League. They were captained by Ravichandran Ashwin. KXIP finished 6th in the IPL and did not qualify for the playoffs.

== Background ==
In October 2018 Marcus Stoinis was traded to Royal Challengers Bangalore for Mandeep Singh.

In November 2018, Kings XI announced their list of retained players for the 2019 season. The list included K. L. Rahul, Chris Gayle, Andrew Tye, Mayank Agarwal, Ankit Rajpoot, Mujeeb Ur Rahman, Karun Nair, David Miller and Ravichandran Ashwin.

On 18 December 2018, the IPL player auction was held in which the Kings XI signed up 13 more players: Varun Chakravarthy, Sam Curran, Mohammed Shami, Prabhsimran Singh, Nicholas Pooran, Moises Henriques, Hardus Viljoen, Darshan Nalkande, Sarfaraz Khan, Arshdeep Singh, Agnivesh Ayachi, Harpreet Brar and Murugan Ashwin.

== Squad ==
- Players with international caps are listed in **bold**.

No.	Name	Nationality	Birth date	Batting style	Bowling style	Year signed	Salary	Notes
Batsmen
1	**K. L. Rahul**	India	18 April 1992 (aged 26)	Right-handed		2018	₹11 crore (US$1.3 million)	Occasional Wicket-Keeper; Vice Captain
10	**David Miller**	South Africa	10 June 1989 (aged 29)	Left-handed	Right-arm off break	2018	₹3 crore (US$350,000)	Overseas
14	**Mayank Agarwal**	India	16 February 1991 (aged 28)	Right-handed		2018	₹1 crore (US$120,000)	
18	**Mandeep Singh**	India	18 December 1991 (aged 27)	Right-handed	Right-arm medium	2019		
69	**Karun Nair**	India	6 December 1991 (aged 27)	Right-handed	Right-arm off break	2018	₹5.6 crore (US$650,000)	
97	Sarfaraz Khan	India	27 October 1997 (aged 21)	Right-handed		2019	₹25 lakh (US$29,000)	
333	**Chris Gayle**	Jamaica	21 September 1979 (aged 39)	Left-handed	Right-arm off break	2018	₹2 crore (US$230,000)	Overseas
All-rounders
21	**Moises Henriques**	Australia	1 February 1987 (aged 32)	Right-handed	Right-arm medium-fast	2019	₹1.1 crore (US$130,000)	Overseas
58	**Sam Curran**	England	3 June 1998 (aged 20)	Left-handed	Left-arm medium-fast	2019	₹7.2 crore (US$840,000)	Overseas
95	Harpreet Brar	India	16 September 1995 (aged 23)	Left-handed	Slow left-arm orthodox	2019	₹20 lakh (US$23,000)	
—	Darshan Nalkande	India	4 October 1998 (aged 20)	Right-handed	Right-arm medium-fast	2019	₹30 lakh (US$35,000)	
—	Agnivesh Ayachi	India	15 June 1995 (aged 23)	Right-handed	Right-arm medium	2019	₹20 lakh (US$23,000)	
Wicket-keepers
29	**Nicholas Pooran**	Trinidad and Tobago	2 October 1995 (aged 23)	Left-handed		2019	₹4.2 crore (US$490,000)	Overseas
84	Prabhsimran Singh	India	18 April 2000 (aged 18)	Right-handed		2019	₹4.8 crore (US$560,000)	
Bowlers
2	Arshdeep Singh	India	5 February 1999 (aged 20)	Left-handed	Left-arm medium-fast	2019	₹20 lakh (US$23,000)	
3	Ankit Rajpoot	India	4 December 1993 (aged 25)	Right-handed	Right-arm fast-medium	2018	₹3 crore (US$350,000)	
7	**Hardus Viljoen**	South Africa	6 March 1989 (aged 30)	Right-handed	Right-arm fast	2019	₹75 lakh (US$88,000)	Overseas
11	**Mohammed Shami**	India	3 September 1990 (aged 28)	Right-handed	Right-arm fast-medium	2019	₹4.8 crore (US$560,000)	
68	**Andrew Tye**	Australia	12 December 1986 (aged 32)	Right-handed	Right-arm medium-fast	2018	₹7.2 crore (US$840,674.00)	Overseas
88	**Mujeeb Ur Rahman**	Afghanistan	28 March 2001 (aged 17)	Right-handed	Right-arm off break	2018	₹4 crore (US$470,000)	Overseas
89	Murugan Ashwin	India	8 September 1990 (aged 28)	Right-handed	Right-arm leg break	2019	₹20 lakh (US$23,000)	
91	Varun Chakravarthy	India	29 August 1991 (aged 27)	Right-handed	Right-arm leg break	2019	₹8.4 crore (US$980,000)	
99	**Ravichandran Ashwin**	India	17 September 1986 (aged 32)	Right-handed	Right-arm off break	2018	₹7.6 crore (US$890,000)	Captain

== Coaching and support staff ==
- Head coach - Mike Hesson
- Batting coach - Sridharan Sriram
- Bowling coach - Ryan Harris
- Fielding coach - Craig McMillan
- Strength and conditioning coach - Nishant Thakur

Ref

== Season ==
=== League table ===
Pos	Team	Pld	W	L	NR	Pts	NRR	
1	Mumbai Indians (C)	14	9	5	0	18	0.421	Advanced to Qualifier 1
2	Chennai Super Kings (R)	14	9	5	0	18	0.131	Advanced to Qualifier 1
3	Delhi Capitals	14	9	5	0	18	0.044	Advanced to the Eliminator
4	Sunrisers Hyderabad	14	6	8	0	12	0.577	Advanced to the Eliminator
5	Kolkata Knight Riders	14	6	8	0	12	0.028	
6	Kings XI Punjab	14	6	8	0	12	−0.251	
7	Rajasthan Royals	14	5	8	1	11	−0.449	
8	Royal Challengers Bangalore	14	5	8	1	11	−0.607	

Source: ESPNCricinfo
The four top ranked teams qualify for the playoffs

=== Fixtures ===
25 March
20:00 (D/N)
Scorecard

Kings XI Punjab; 184/4 (20 overs)	v	Rajasthan Royals (H); 170/9 (20 overs)
Chris Gayle 79 (47); Ben Stokes 2/48 (4 overs)		Jos Buttler 69 (43); Mujeeb Ur Rahman 2/31 (4 overs)

Punjab won by 14 runs
Sawai Mansingh Stadium, Jaipur
Umpires: K. N. Ananthapadmanabhan (Ind) and Chettithody Shamshuddin (Ind)
Player of the match: Chris Gayle (Kings XI Punjab)

- Rajasthan Royals won the toss and elected to field.
- Jos Buttler (Rajasthan Royals) was dismissed by Mankading.

27 March
20:00 (D/N)
Scorecard

(H) Kolkata Knight Riders; 218/4 (20 overs)	v	Kings XI Punjab; 190/4 (20 overs)
Robin Uthappa 67* (50); Varun Chakravarthy 1/35 (3 overs)		David Miller 59* (40); Andre Russell 2/21 (3 overs)

Kolkata won by 28 runs
Eden Gardens, Kolkata
Umpires: Anil Chaudhary (Ind) and Vineet Kulkarni (Ind)
Player of the match: Andre Russell (Kolkata Knight Riders)

- Kings XI Punjab won the toss and elected to field.
- Varun Chakravarthy (Kings XI Punjab) made his T20 debut. His first over went for 25 runs, the highest number of runs conceded by a bowler on debut in the IPL.
- Sunil Narine (Kolkata Knight Riders) played in his 100th IPL match.
- Kolkata Knight Riders made their highest total at home in the IPL.

30 March
16:00 (D/N)
Scorecard

Mumbai Indians; 176/7 (20 overs)	v	Kings XI Punjab (H); 177/2 (18.4 overs)
Quinton de Kock 60 (39); Murugan Ashwin 2/25 (4 overs)		K. L. Rahul 71* (57); Krunal Pandya 2/43 (4 overs)

Punjab won by 8 wickets
Punjab Cricket Association IS Bindra Stadium, Mohali
Umpires: Chris Gaffaney (NZ) and Vineet Kulkarni (Ind)
Player of the match: Mayank Agarwal (Kings XI Punjab)

- Kings XI Punjab won the toss and elected to field.

1 April
20:00 (D/N)
Scorecard

(H) Kings XI Punjab; 166/9 (20 overs)	v	Delhi Capitals; 152 (19.2 overs)
David Miller 43 (30); Chris Morris 3/30 (4 overs)		Rishabh Pant 39 (26); Sam Curran 4/11 (2.2 overs)

Punjab won by 14 runs
Punjab Cricket Association IS Bindra Stadium, Mohali
Umpires: Anil Chaudhary (Ind) and Chris Gaffaney (NZ)
Player of the match: Sam Curran (Kings XI Punjab)

- Delhi Capitals won the toss and elected to field.
- Sam Curran (Kings XI Punjab) took a hat-trick.

6 April 2019
16:00 (D/N)
Scorecard

(H) Chennai Super Kings; 160/3 (20 overs)	v	Kings XI Punjab; 138/5 (20 overs)
Faf du Plessis 54 (38); Ravichandran Ashwin 3/23 (4 overs)		Sarfaraz Khan 67 (59); Harbhajan Singh 2/17 (4 overs)

Chennai won by 22 runs
M. A. Chidambaram Stadium, Chennai
Umpires: K. N. Ananthapadmanabhan (Ind) and Rod Tucker (Aus)
Player of the match: Harbhajan Singh (Chennai Super Kings)

- Chennai Super Kings won the toss and elected to bat.

8 April
20:00 (D/N)
Scorecard

Sunrisers Hyderabad; 150/4 (20 overs)	v	Kings XI Punjab (H); 151/4 (19.5 overs)
David Warner 70* (62); Mohammed Shami 1/30 (4 overs); Ravichandran Ashwin 1/30 (4 overs)		K. L. Rahul 71* (53); Sandeep Sharma 2/21 (4 overs)

Punjab won by 6 wickets
Punjab Cricket Association IS Bindra Stadium, Mohali
Umpires: Anil Dandekar (Ind) and Marais Erasmus (SA)
Player of the match: K. L. Rahul (Kings XI Punjab)

- Kings XI Punjab won the toss and elected to field.

10 April
20:00 (D/N)
Scorecard

Kings XI Punjab; 197/4 (20 overs)	v	Mumbai Indians (H); 198/7 (20 overs)
K. L. Rahul 100* (64); Hardik Pandya 2/57 (4 overs)		Kieron Pollard 83 (31); Mohammed Shami 3/21 (4 overs)

Mumbai won by 3 wickets
Wankhede Stadium, Mumbai
Umpires: Yeshwant Barde (Ind) and Sundaram Ravi (Ind)
Player of the match: Kieron Pollard (Mumbai Indians)

- Mumbai Indians won the toss and elected to field.
- K. L. Rahul (Kings XI Punjab) scored his first century in the IPL.
- Mumbai Indians recorded their highest ever successful run chase in the IPL.

13 April
20:00 (D/N)
Scorecard

(H) Kings XI Punjab; 173/4 (20 overs)	v	Royal Challengers Bangalore; 174/2 (19.2 overs)
Chris Gayle 99* (64); Yuzvendra Chahal 2/33 (4 overs)		Virat Kohli 67 (53); Ravichandran Ashwin 1/30 (4 overs)

Bangalore won by 8 wickets
Punjab Cricket Association IS Bindra Stadium, Mohali
Umpires: Ulhas Gandhe (Ind) and Sundaram Ravi (Ind)
Player of the match: AB de Villiers (Royal Challengers Bangalore)

- Royal Challengers Bangalore won the toss and elected to field.

16 April
20:00 (D/N)
Scorecard

(H) Kings XI Punjab; 182/6 (20 overs)	v	Rajasthan Royals; 170/7 (20 overs)
K. L. Rahul 52 (47); Jofra Archer 3/15 (4 overs)		Rahul Tripathi 50 (45); Ravichandran Ashwin 2/24 (4 overs)

Punjab won by 12 runs
Punjab Cricket Association IS Bindra Stadium, Mohali
Umpires: Anil Chaudhary (Ind) and Vineet Kulkarni (Ind)
Player of the match: Ravichandran Ashwin (Kings Xi Punjab)

- Rajasthan Royals won the toss and elected to field.
- Arshdeep Singh (Kings XI Punjab) made his T20 debut.

20 April
20:00 (D/N)
Scorecard

Kings XI Punjab; 163/7 (20 overs)	v	Delhi Capitals (H); 166/5 (19.4 overs)
Chris Gayle 69 (37); Sandeep Lamichhane 3/40 (4 overs)		Shreyas Iyer 58* (49); Hardus Viljoen 2/39 (4 overs)

Delhi won by 5 wickets
Feroz Shah Kotla Ground, Delhi
Umpires: Ulhas Gandhe (Ind) and Chettithody Shamshuddin (Ind)
Player of the match: Shreyas Iyer (Delhi Capitals)

- Delhi Capitals won the toss and elected to field.
- Harpreet Brar (Kings XI Punjab) made his T20 debut.

24 April
20:00 (D/N)
Scorecard

(H) Royal Challengers Bangalore; 202/4 (20 overs)	v	Kings XI Punjab; 185/7 (20 overs)
AB de Villiers 82* (44); Ravichandran Ashwin 1/15 (4 overs)		Nicholas Pooran 46 (28); Umesh Yadav 3/36 (4 overs)

Bangalore won by 17 runs
M. Chinnaswamy Stadium, Bengaluru
Umpires: Bruce Oxenford (Aus) and Chettithody Shamshuddin (Ind)
Player of the match: AB de Villiers (Royal Challengers Bangalore)

- Kings XI Punjab won the toss and elected to field.

29 April
20:00 (D/N)
Scorecard

(H) Sunrisers Hyderabad; 212/6 (20 overs)	v	Kings XI Punjab; 167/8 (20 overs)
David Warner 81 (56); Ravichandran Ashwin 2/30 (4 overs)		K. L. Rahul 79 (56); Rashid Khan 3/21 (4 overs)

Hyderabad won by 45 runs
Rajiv Gandhi International Cricket Stadium, Hyderabad
Umpires: C. K. Nandan (Ind) and Sundaram Ravi (Ind)
Player of the match: David Warner (Sunrisers Hyderabad)

- Kings XI Punjab won the toss and elected to field.

3 May
20:00 (D/N)
Scorecard

(H) Kings XI Punjab; 183/6 (20 overs)	v	Kolkata Knight Riders; 185/3 (18 overs)
Sam Curran 55* (24); Sandeep Warrier 2/31 (4 overs)		Shubman Gill 65* (49); Mohammed Shami 1/15 (3 overs)

Kolkata won by 7 wickets
Punjab Cricket Association IS Bindra Stadium, Mohali
Umpires: Bruce Oxenford (Aus) and Chettithody Shamshuddin (Ind)
Player of the match: Shubman Gill (Kolkata Knight Riders)

- Kolkata Knight Riders won the toss and elected to field.

5 May
16:00 (D/N)
Scorecard

Chennai Super Kings; 170/5 (20 overs)	v	Kings XI Punjab (H); 173/4 (18 overs)
Faf du Plessis 96 (55); Sam Curran 3/35 (4 overs)		K. L. Rahul 71 (36); Harbhajan Singh 3/57 (4 overs)

Punjab won by 6 wickets
Punjab Cricket Association IS Bindra Stadium, Mohali
Umpires: K. N. Ananthapadmanabhan (Ind) and Chettithody Shamshuddin (Ind)
Player of the match: K. L. Rahul (Kings XI Punjab)

- Kings XI Punjab won the toss and elected to field.
- Kings XI Punjab were eliminated and Chennai Super Kings advanced to Qualifier 1 as a result of this match.

== Statistics ==
=== Most runs ===
No.	Name	Match	Inns	NO	Runs	HS	Ave.	BF	SR	100s	50s	0	4s	6s
1	KL Rahul	14	14	3	593	100*	53.90	438	135.38	1	6	0	49	25
2	Chris Gayle	13	13	1	490	99*	40.83	319	153.60	0	4	0	45	34
3	Mayank Agarwal	13	13	1	332	58	25.53	234	141.88	0	2	1	26	14
4	David Miller	10	10	2	213	59*	26.62	164	129.87	0	1	0	19	7
5	Sarfaraz Khan	8	5	1	180	67	45.00	143	125.87	0	1	0	19	4

- Source: IPL

=== Most wickets ===
No.	Name	Match	Inns	Overs	Maidens	Runs	Wickets	BBI	Ave.	Econ.	SR	4W	5W
1	Mohammed Shami	14	14	54.0	0	469	19	3/21	24.68	8.68	17.0	0	0
2	Ravichandran Ashwin	14	14	55.0	0	400	15	3/23	26.66	7.27	22.0	0	0
3	Sam Curran	9	9	33.0	0	323	10	4/11	32.30	9.78	19.8	1	0
4	Hardus Viljoen	6	6	23.0	0	222	7	2/39	31.71	9.65	19.7	0	0
5	Murugan Ashwin	10	10	34.0	0	255	5	2/25	51.00	7.50	40.8	0	0

- Source:Cricinfo

== Player of the match awards ==
No.	Date	Player	Opponent	Result	Contribution	Ref.
1	25 March 2019	Chris Gayle	Rajasthan Royals	Won by 14 runs	79 runs in 47 balls	
2	30 March 2019	Mayank Agarwal	Mumbai Indians	Won by 8 wickets	43 runs in 21 balls	
3	1 April 2019	Sam Curran	Delhi Capitals	Won by 14 runs	4/11 (2.2 overs) & 20 runs in 10 balls	
4	8 April 2019	KL Rahul	Sunrisers Hyderabad	Won by 6 wickets	71* runs in 53 balls	
5	16 April 2019	Ravichandran Ashwin	Rajasthan Royals	Won by 12 runs	2/24 (4 overs) & 17 runs in 4 balls	
6	5 May 2019	KL Rahul	Chennai Super Kings	Won by 6 wickets	71 runs in 36 balls	
