= 2019 Rajasthan Royals season =

Indian Premier League season of a cricket club

Rajasthan Royals
2019 season
- Coach: Paddy Upton
- Captain: Ajinkya Rahane (first 8 matches); Steve Smith (9th match onwards)
- Ground(s): Sawai Mansingh Stadium, Jaipur
- 2019 Indian Premier League: 7th
- Most runs: Ajinkya Rahane (393)
- Most wickets: Shreyas Gopal (20)

The 2019 season was the 10th season for the Indian Premier League franchise Rajasthan Royals. The team was captained by Ajinkya Rahane.

== Background ==
=== Player retention and auction ===
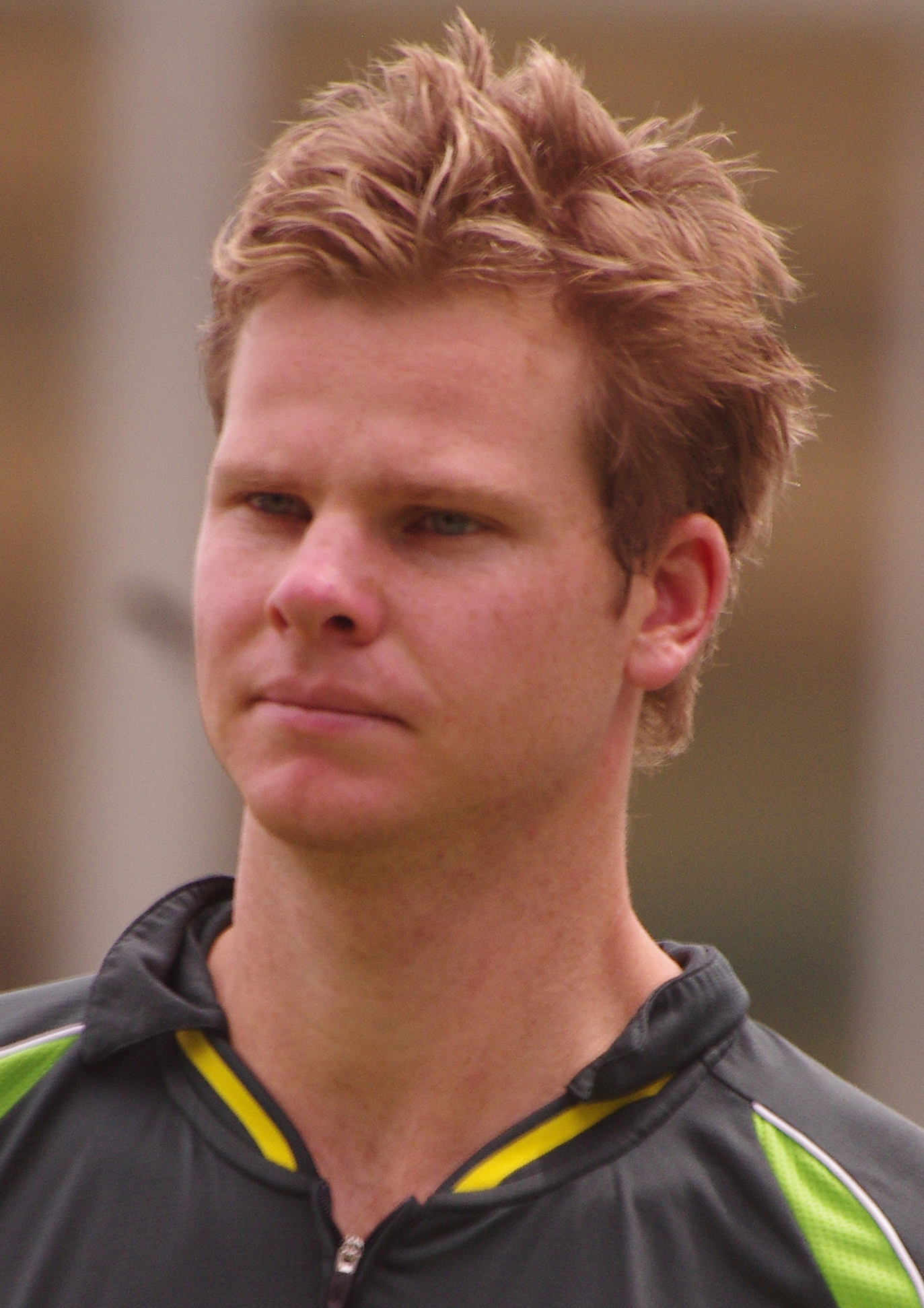
Smith returned to the team after serving his 12-month ban

In November 2018, the Royals announced their list of retained players for the 2019 season. The list included Ajinkya Rahane, Krishnappa Gowtham, Sanju Samson, Shreyas Gopal, Aryaman Birla, Sudhesan Midhun, Prashant Chopra, Stuart Binny, Rahul Tripathi, Dhawal Kulkarni and Mahipal Lomror among Indian players, and Ben Stokes, Steve Smith, Jos Buttler, Jofra Archer, Ish Sodhi among overseas players. The Royals thus had a purse of ₹18.3 crore and nine slots remaining in their roster ahead of the player auction.

On 18 December 2018, the IPL player auction was held in which the Royals signed nine more players: Jaydev Unadkat, Varun Aaron, Oshane Thomas, Ashton Turner, Liam Livingstone, Shashank Singh, Riyan Parag, Manan Vohra and Shubham Ranjane. They filled their quota of 25 players with 17 Indian and 8 overseas players.

=== Preseason ===
In February 2019, the Royals announced that they would wear pink jerseys in the 2019 season, changing from blue which had been the primary colour of their kit since 2008. Team captain Rahane and brand ambassador Shane Warne attributed the change to the Royals' home being Jaipur which is known as "Pink City" as well as the response received for a previous season's match in which they had worn pink for cancer awareness.

In March 2019, the franchise opened a cricket academy based at Reed's School, Surrey, England, called the Rajasthan Royals Academy.

=== Team analysis ===
In his preview, Shashank Kishore of ESPNcricinfo wrote that while Royals have "great depth" in their squad they "need strategic precision" in the season. He concluded his analysis saying, "Even if a top-two finish may seem far-fetched, they will definitely be in the running for third or fourth." Firstpost stated that Indian players will "dictate to a great extent [..] the balance of the side [and] their position in two months time" and opined that they have the players "to improve on their Playoff finish from last year." News18 termed the "lack of a world-class spinner" as the team's weakness and suggested that the team "might suffer in the latter stages of the tournament" if their overseas players leave for World Cup preparations.

== Squad ==
- Players with international caps are listed in **bold**.

No.	Name	Nationality	Birth date	Batting style	Bowling style	Year signed	Salary	Notes
Batsmen
3	**Ajinkya Rahane**	India	5 June 1988 (aged 30)	Right-handed	Right-arm medium	2018	₹4 crore (US$415,000)	Captain till match 8; Vice Captain from match 9 onwards
9	Aryaman Birla	India	9 July 1997 (aged 21)	Left-handed	Slow left-arm orthodox	2018	₹30 lakh (US$31,000)	
11	Prashant Chopra	India	7 October 1992 (aged 26)	Right-handed	Right-arm leg break	2018	₹20 lakh (US$21,000)	
18	Manan Vohra	India	18 July 1993 (aged 25)	Right-handed	Right-arm medium	2019	₹20 lakh (US$21,000)	
27	**Liam Livingstone**	England	4 August 1993 (aged 25)	Left-handed	Right-arm leg break	2019	₹50 lakh (US$52,000)	Overseas
43	Shashank Singh	India	21 November 1991 (aged 27)	Right-handed	Right-arm off break	2019	₹20 lakh (US$21,000)	
49	**Steve Smith**	Australia	2 June 1989 (aged 29)	Right-handed	Right-arm leg break	2018	₹12 crore (US$1.2 million)	Overseas; Vice Captain till match 8; Captain from match 9
52	Rahul Tripathi	India	2 March 1991 (aged 28)	Right-handed	Right-arm medium	2018	₹3.4 crore (US$353,000)	
70	**Ashton Turner**	Australia	25 January 1993 (aged 26)	Right-handed	Right-arm off break	2019	₹50 lakh (US$52,000)	Overseas
All-rounders
5	Riyan Parag	India	10 November 2001 (aged 17)	Right-handed	Right-arm off break	2019	₹20 lakh (US$21,000)	
6	Mahipal Lomror	India	16 November 1999 (aged 19)	Left-handed	Slow left-arm orthodox	2018	₹20 lakh (US$21,000)	
7	Krishnappa Gowtham	India	20 October 1988 (aged 30)	Right-handed	Right-arm off break	2018	₹6.2 crore (US$644,000)	
37	Shreyas Gopal	India	4 September 1993 (aged 25)	Right-handed	Right-arm leg break	2018	₹20 lakh (US$21,000)	
55	**Ben Stokes**	England	4 June 1991 (aged 27)	Left-handed	Right-arm fast-medium	2018	₹12.5 crore (US$1.3 million)	Overseas
84	**Stuart Binny**	India	3 June 1984 (aged 34)	Right-handed	Right-arm medium	2018	₹50 lakh (US$52,000)	
700	Shubham Ranjane	India	26 March 1994 (aged 24)	Right-handed	Right-arm medium	2019	₹20 lakh (US$21,000)	
Wicket-keepers
8	**Sanju Samson**	India	11 November 1994 (aged 24)	Right-handed		2018	₹8 crore (US$830,740.00)	
63	**Jos Buttler**	England	8 September 1990 (aged 28)	Right-handed		2018	₹4.4 crore (US$457,000)	Overseas
Bowlers
17	**Oshane Thomas**	Jamaica	18 February 1997 (aged 22)	Left-handed	Right-arm fast-medium	2019	₹1.1 crore (US$114,000)	Overseas
19	Sudhesan Midhun	India	7 October 1994 (aged 24)	Right-handed	Right-arm leg break	2018	₹20 lakh (US$21,000)	
22	**Jofra Archer**	England	1 April 1995 (aged 23)	Right-handed	Right-arm fast-medium	2018	₹7.2 crore (US$747,666.00)	Overseas
61	**Ish Sodhi**	New Zealand	31 October 1992 (aged 26)	Right-handed	Right-arm leg break	2018	₹50 lakh (US$52,000)	Overseas
77	**Varun Aaron**	India	29 October 1989 (aged 29)	Right-handed	Right-arm fast	2019	₹2.4 crore (US$249,000)	
95	**Dhawal Kulkarni**	India	10 December 1988 (aged 30)	Right-handed	Right-arm medium	2018	₹75 lakh (US$78,000)	
99	**Jaydev Unadkat**	India	18 October 1991 (aged 27)	Right-handed	Left-arm medium	2019	₹8.4 crore (US$872,277.00)	

== Coaching and support staff ==
- Head coach - Paddy Upton
- Batting coach - Amol Muzumdar
- Spin bowling coach - Sairaj Bahutule
- Fast bowling coach - Steffan Jones
- Fielding coach - Dishant Yagnik
- Head of cricket - Zubin Bharucha
- Physiotherapist - John Gloster

Ref

== Season ==
=== League table ===
Pos	Team	Pld	W	L	NR	Pts	NRR	
1	Mumbai Indians (C)	14	9	5	0	18	0.421	Advanced to Qualifier 1
2	Chennai Super Kings (R)	14	9	5	0	18	0.131	Advanced to Qualifier 1
3	Delhi Capitals	14	9	5	0	18	0.044	Advanced to the Eliminator
4	Sunrisers Hyderabad	14	6	8	0	12	0.577	Advanced to the Eliminator
5	Kolkata Knight Riders	14	6	8	0	12	0.028	
6	Kings XI Punjab	14	6	8	0	12	−0.251	
7	Rajasthan Royals	14	5	8	1	11	−0.449	
8	Royal Challengers Bangalore	14	5	8	1	11	−0.607	

Source: ESPNCricinfo
The four top ranked teams qualify for the playoffs

=== Match results ===
==== League stage ====
25 March
20:00 (D/N)
Scorecard

Kings XI Punjab; 184/4 (20 overs)	v	Rajasthan Royals (H); 170/9 (20 overs)
Chris Gayle 79 (47); Ben Stokes 2/48 (4 overs)		Jos Buttler 69 (43); Mujeeb Ur Rahman 2/31 (4 overs)

Punjab won by 14 runs
Sawai Mansingh Stadium, Jaipur
Umpires: K. N. Ananthapadmanabhan (Ind) and Chettithody Shamshuddin (Ind)
Player of the match: Chris Gayle (Kings XI Punjab)

- Rajasthan Royals won the toss and elected to field.
- Jos Buttler (Rajasthan Royals) was dismissed by Mankading.

29 March
20:00 (D/N)
Scorecard

Rajasthan Royals; 198/2 (20 overs)	v	Sunrisers Hyderabad (H); 201/5 (19 overs)
Sanju Samson 102* (55); Rashid Khan 1/24 (4 overs)		David Warner 69 (37); Shreyas Gopal 3/27 (4 overs)

Hyderabad won by 5 wickets
Rajiv Gandhi International Cricket Stadium, Hyderabad
Umpires: Bruce Oxenford (Aus) and Chettithody Shamshuddin (Ind)
Player of the match: Rashid Khan (Sunrisers Hyderabad)

- Rajasthan Royals won the toss and elected to bat.
- This was Sunrisers Hyderabad's highest successful run chase in the IPL.

31 March
20:00 (D/N)
Scorecard

(H) Chennai Super Kings; 175/5 (20 overs)	v	Rajasthan Royals; 167/8 (20 overs)
MS Dhoni 75* (46); Jofra Archer 2/17 (4 overs)		Ben Stokes 46 (26); Deepak Chahar 2/19 (4 overs)

Chennai won by 8 runs
M. A. Chidambaram Stadium, Chennai
Umpires: Yeshwant Barde (Ind) and C. K. Nandan (Ind)
Player of the match: MS Dhoni (Chennai Super Kings)

- Rajasthan Royals won the toss and elected to field.

2 April
20:00 (D/N)
Scorecard

Royal Challengers Bangalore; 158/4 (20 overs)	v	Rajasthan Royals (H); 164/3 (19.5 overs)
Parthiv Patel 67 (41); Shreyas Gopal 3/12 (4 overs)		Jos Buttler 59 (43); Yuzvendra Chahal 2/17 (4 overs)

Rajasthan won by 7 wickets
Sawai Mansingh Stadium, Jaipur
Umpires: Anil Dandekar (Ind) and Marais Erasmus (SA)
Player of the match: Shreyas Gopal (Rajasthan Royals)

- Rajasthan Royals won the toss and elected to field.
- Virat Kohli (Royal Challengers Bangalore) played in his 100th IPL match as captain.

7 April
20:00 (D/N)
Scorecard

(H) Rajasthan Royals; 139/3 (20 overs)	v	Kolkata Knight Riders; 140/2 (13.5 overs)
Steve Smith 73* (59); Harry Gurney 2/25 (4 overs)		Chris Lynn 50 (32); Shreyas Gopal 2/35 (4 overs)

Kolkata won by 8 wickets
Sawai Mansingh Stadium, Jaipur
Umpires: Anil Chaudhary (Ind) and Chris Gaffaney (NZ)
Player of the match: Harry Gurney (Kolkata Knight Riders)

- Kolkata Knight Riders won the toss and elected to field.

11 April
20:00 (D/N)
Scorecard

(H) Rajasthan Royals; 151/7 (20 overs)	v	Chennai Super Kings; 155/6 (20 overs)
Ben Stokes 28 (26); Ravindra Jadeja 2/20 (4 overs)		MS Dhoni 58 (43); Ben Stokes 2/39 (3 overs)

Chennai won by 4 wickets
Sawai Mansingh Stadium, Jaipur
Umpires: Ulhas Gandhe (Ind) and Bruce Oxenford (Aus)
Player of the match: MS Dhoni (Chennai Super Kings)

- Chennai Super Kings won the toss and elected to field.

13 April
16:00 (D/N)
Scorecard

(H) Mumbai Indians; 187/5 (20 overs)	v	Rajasthan Royals; 188/6 (19.3 overs)
Quinton de Kock 81 (52); Jofra Archer 3/39 (4 overs)		Jos Buttler 89 (43); Krunal Pandya 3/34 (4 overs)

Rajasthan won by 4 wickets
Wankhede Stadium, Mumbai
Umpires: Nand Kishore (Ind) and Nitin Menon (Ind)
Player of the match: Jos Buttler (Rajasthan Royals)

- Rajasthan Royals won the toss and elected to field.

16 April
20:00 (D/N)
Scorecard

(H) Kings XI Punjab; 182/6 (20 overs)	v	Rajasthan Royals; 170/7 (20 overs)
K. L. Rahul 52 (47); Jofra Archer 3/15 (4 overs)		Rahul Tripathi 50 (45); Ravichandran Ashwin 2/24 (4 overs)

Punjab won by 12 runs
Punjab Cricket Association IS Bindra Stadium, Mohali
Umpires: Anil Chaudhary (Ind) and Vineet Kulkarni (Ind)
Player of the match: Ravichandran Ashwin (Kings Xi Punjab)

- Rajasthan Royals won the toss and elected to field.
- Arshdeep Singh (Kings XI Punjab) made his T20 debut.

20 April
16:00 (D/N)
Scorecard

Mumbai Indians; 161/5 (20 overs)	v	Rajasthan Royals (H); 162/5 (19.1 overs)
Quinton de Kock 65 (47); Shreyas Gopal 2/21 (4 overs)		Steve Smith 59* (48); Rahul Chahar 3/29 (4 overs)

Rajasthan won by 5 wickets
Sawai Mansingh Stadium, Jaipur
Umpires: Yeshwant Barde (Ind) and Sundaram Ravi (Ind)
Player of the match: Steve Smith (Rajasthan Royals)

- Rajasthan Royals won the toss and elected to field.

22 April
20:00 (D/N)
Scorecard

(H) Rajasthan Royals; 191/6 (20 overs)	v	Delhi Capitals; 193/4 (19.2 overs)
Ajinkya Rahane 105* (63); Kagiso Rabada 2/37 (4 overs)		Rishabh Pant 78* (36); Shreyas Gopal 2/47 (4 overs)

Delhi won by 6 wickets
Sawai Mansingh Stadium, Jaipur
Umpires: Nand Kishore (Ind) and Sundaram Ravi (Ind)
Player of the match: Rishabh Pant (Delhi Capitals)

- Delhi Capitals won the toss and elected to field.
- Ashton Turner (Rajasthan Royals) became the first batsman to make five consecutive ducks in Twenty20 cricket.

25 April
20:00 (D/N)
Scorecard

(H) Kolkata Knight Riders; 175/6 (20 overs)	v	Rajasthan Royals; 177/7 (19.2 overs)
Dinesh Karthik 97* (50); Varun Aaron 2/20 (4 overs)		Riyan Parag 47 (31); Piyush Chawla 3/20 (4 overs)

Rajasthan won by 3 wickets
Eden Gardens, Kolkata
Umpires: Anil Dandekar (Ind) and Ian Gould (Eng)
Player of the match: Varun Aaron (Rajasthan Royals)

- Rajasthan Royals won the toss and elected to field.

27 April
20:00 (D/N)
Scorecard

Sunrisers Hyderabad; 160/8 (20 overs)	v	Rajasthan Royals (H); 161/3 (19.1 overs)
Manish Pandey 61 (36); Jaydev Unadkat 2/26 (4 overs)		Sanju Samson 48* (32); Shakib Al Hasan 1/26 (3.1 overs)

Rajasthan won by 7 wickets
Sawai Mansingh Stadium, Jaipur
Umpires: Yeshwant Barde (Ind) and Nand Kishore (Ind)
Player of the match: Jaydev Unadkat (Rajasthan Royals)

- Rajasthan Royals won the toss and elected to field.
- Chennai Super Kings qualified for the playoffs as a result of this match.

30 April
20:00 (D/N)
Scorecard

(H) Royal Challengers Bangalore; 62/7 (5 overs)	v	Rajasthan Royals; 41/1 (3.2 overs)
Virat Kohli 25 (7); Shreyas Gopal 3/12 (1 over)		Sanju Samson 28 (13); Yuzvendra Chahal 1/0 (0.2 overs)

No result
M. Chinnaswamy Stadium, Bengaluru
Umpires: Ulhas Gandhe (Ind) and Nigel Llong (Eng)

- Rajasthan Royals won the toss and elected to field.
- The match was reduced to 5 overs per side due to rain.
- Royal Challengers Bangalore were eliminated as a result of this match.
- Shreyas Gopal (Rajasthan Royals) took a hat-trick.

4 May
16:00 (D/N)
Scorecard

Rajasthan Royals; 115/9 (20 overs)	v	Delhi Capitals (H); 121/5 (16.1 overs)
Riyan Parag 50 (49); Amit Mishra 3/17 (4 overs)		Rishabh Pant 53* (38); Ish Sodhi 3/26 (3.1 overs)

Delhi won by 5 wickets
Feroz Shah Kotla, Delhi
Umpires: Anil Dandekar (Ind) and Ian Gould (Eng)
Player of the match: Amit Mishra (Delhi Capitals)

- Rajasthan Royals won the toss and elected to bat.
- Rajasthan Royals were eliminated as a result of this match.

== Statistics ==
=== Most runs ===
No.	Name	Match	Inns	NO	Runs	HS	Ave.	BF	SR	100s	50s	0	4s	6s
1	Ajinkya Rahane	14	13	1	393	105*	32.75	285	137.89	1	1	1	45	9
2	Sanju Samson	12	12	2	342	102*	34.20	230	148.69	1	1	1	28	13
3	Steve Smith	12	10	2	319	73*	39.87	275	116.00	0	3	0	30	4
4	Jos Buttler	8	8	0	311	89	38.87	205	151.70	0	3	0	38	14
5	Riyan Parag	7	5	0	160	50	32.00	126	126.98	0	1	0	17	5

- Last updated: 5 May 2019
- Source:Cricinfo

=== Most wickets ===
No.	Name	Match	Inns	Overs	Maidens	Runs	Wickets	BBI	Ave.	Econ.	SR	4W	5W
1	Shreyas Gopal	14	14	48.0	1	347	20	3/12	17.35	7.22	14.4	0	0
2	Jofra Archer	11	11	43.0	2	291	11	3/15	26.45	6.76	23.4	0	0
3	Jaydev Unadkat	11	11	37.2	0	398	10	2/26	39.80	10.66	22.4	0	0
4	Ben Stokes	9	6	16.5	0	189	6	2/39	31.50	11.22	16.8	0	0
5	Dhawal Kulkarni	10	10	35.0	1	335	6	1/14	55.83	9.57	35.0	0	0

- Last updated: 5 May 2019
- Source:Cricinfo

== Player of the match awards ==
No.	Date	Player	Opponent	Result	Contribution	Ref.
1	2 April 2019	Shreyas Gopal	Royal Challengers Bangalore	Won By 7 wickets	3/12 (4 overs)	
2	13 April 2019	Jos Buttler	Mumbai Indians	Won By 4 wickets	89 runs in 43 balls	
3	20 April 2019	Steve Smith	Mumbai Indians	Won By 5 wickets	59* runs in 48 balls	
4	25 April 2019	Varun Aaron	Kolkata Knight Riders	Won By 3 wickets	2/20 (4 overs)	
5	27 April 2019	Jaydev Unadkat	Sunrisers Hyderabad	Won By 7 wickets	2/26 (4 overs)	
