= 2019 Kolkata Knight Riders season =

Indian Premier League cricket team season

Kolkata Knight Riders
2019 season
- Coach: Jacques Kallis
- Captain: Dinesh Karthik
- Ground(s): Eden Gardens, Kolkata
- 2019 Indian Premier League: 5th
- Most runs: Andre Russell (510)
- Most wickets: Andre Russell (11)

The 2019 season was the 12th season for the Indian Premier League (IPL) franchise Kolkata Knight Riders. They were one of the eight teams that competed in the 2019 IPL. They finished the season in the fifth place. The team was captained by Dinesh Karthik and coached by Jacques Henry Kallis with Simon Matthew Katich as assistant coach, Omkar Salvia as bowling coach and Abhishek Mohan Nair as mentor

== Background ==
=== Player retention and auction ===
In November 2018, the Knight Riders announced their list of retained players for the 2019 season. The list included Dinesh Karthik, Robin Uthappa, Chris Lynn, Andre Russell, Sunil Narine, Shubman Gill, Piyush Chawla, Kuldeep Yadav, Prasidh Krishna, Shivam Mavi, Nitish Rana, Rinku Singh, Kamlesh Nagarkoti.

On 18 December 2018, the IPL player auction was held in which the Knight Riders signed up nine more players viz., Carlos Brathwaite, Lockie Ferguson, Joe Denly, Harry Gurney, Nikhil Naik, Shrikant Mundhe, Prithvi Raj Yarra and Anrich Nortje.

=== Team analysis ===
ESPNcricinfo's Sreshth Shah predicted the Knight Riders to qualify for the playoffs and listed the team's strengths to be its "power-hitters", Dinesh Karthik's role as captain and finisher, and its spin bowlers' effectiveness. He also pointed out that the team has an "inexperienced pace attack" which had taken the fewest wickets and had the worst economy rate among all teams in the previous season. Hindustan Times wrote in its team preview that "anything less than play-offs will be seen as a failure" for the Knight Riders while also saying that winning the title in 2019 "may just be a step too far" for the team. Firstpost called Andre Russell the "fulcrum of the side" and acknowledged the "variety and depth in the squad." Suggesting the strength of the team to be its spin bowling department, News18 wrote "The variety the likes of Kuldeep Yadav, Sunil Narine and Piyush Chawla bring to the playing XI is unmatchable."

== Squad ==
- Players with international caps are listed in **bold**.

No.	Name	Nationality	Birth date	Batting style	Bowling style	Year signed	Salary	Notes
Batsmen
6	**Joe Denly**	England	16 March 1986 (aged 33)	Right-handed	Right-arm leg break	2019	₹1 crore (US$100,000)	Overseas
27	Nitish Rana	India	27 December 1993 (aged 25)	Left-handed	Right-arm off break	2018	₹3.4 crore (US$353,000)	
35	Rinku Singh	India	12 October 1997 (aged 21)	Left-handed	Right-arm off break	2018	₹80 lakh (US$83,000)	
37	**Robin Uthappa**	India	11 September 1985 (aged 33)	Right-handed	Right-arm medium	2018	₹6.4 crore (US$665,000)	Vice-captain; Occasional wicket-keeper
50	**Chris Lynn**	Australia	10 April 1990 (aged 28)	Right-handed	Slow left-arm orthodox	2018	₹9.6 crore (US$996,888.00)	Overseas
77	**Shubman Gill**	India	8 September 1999 (aged 19)	Right-handed	Right-arm off break	2018	₹1.8 crore (US$187,000)	
All-rounders
12	**Andre Russell**	Jamaica	29 April 1988 (aged 30)	Right-handed	Right-arm fast-medium	2018	₹7 crore (US$726,897.50)	Overseas
26	**Carlos Brathwaite**	Barbados	18 July 1988 (aged 30)	Right-handed	Right-arm fast-medium	2019	₹5 crore (US$520,000)	Overseas
74	**Sunil Narine**	Trinidad and Tobago	26 May 1988 (aged 30)	Left-handed	Right-arm off break	2018	₹8.5 crore (US$882,661.30)	Overseas
—N/a	Kamlesh Nagarkoti	India	28 December 1999 (aged 19)	Right-handed	Right-arm fast	2018	₹3.2 crore (US$332,000)	
—N/a	Shrikant Mundhe	India	27 October 1988 (aged 30)	Right-handed	Right-arm medium-fast	2019	₹20 lakh (US$21,000)	
Wicket-keepers
7	Nikhil Naik	India	9 November 1994 (aged 24)	Right-handed	Right-arm off break	2019	₹20 lakh (US$21,000)	
19	**Dinesh Karthik**	India	1 June 1985 (aged 33)	Right-handed	Right-arm off break	2018	₹7.4 crore (US$768,434.50)	Captain
Bowlers
11	**Harry Gurney**	England	25 October 1986 (aged 32)	Right-handed	Left-arm fast-medium	2019	₹75 lakh (US$78,000)	Overseas
21	**Piyush Chawla**	India	24 December 1988 (aged 30)	Left-handed	Right-arm leg break googly	2018	₹4.2 crore (US$436,000)	
23	**Kuldeep Yadav**	India	14 December 1994 (aged 24)	Left-handed	Slow left-arm wrist-spin	2018	₹5.8 crore (US$602,000)	
25	Prithvi Raj Yarra	India	20 February 1998 (aged 21)	Left-handed	Left-arm medium-fast	2019	₹20 lakh (US$21,000)	
32	Shivam Mavi	India	26 November 1998 (aged 20)	Right-handed	Right-arm fast-medium	2018	₹3 crore (US$312,000)	
43	Prasidh Krishna	India	19 February 1996 (aged 23)	Right-handed	Right-arm fast-medium	2018	₹20 lakh (US$21,000)	
63	Sandeep Warrier	India	4 April 1991 (aged 27)	Right-handed	Right-arm medium-fast	2019	₹20 lakh (US$21,000)	
69	**Lockie Ferguson**	New Zealand	13 June 1991 (aged 27)	Right-handed	Right-arm fast	2019	₹1.6 crore (US$170,000)	Overseas
94	K. C. Cariappa	India	13 April 1994 (aged 24)	Right-handed	Right-arm leg break	2019	₹20 lakh (US$21,000)	
—N/a	**Anrich Nortje**	South Africa	16 November 1993 (aged 25)	Right-handed	Right-arm fast	2019	₹20 lakh (US$21,000)	Overseas
—N/a	Matt Kelly	Australia	7 December 1994 (aged 24)	Right-handed	Right-arm fast-medium	2019	Replacement signing	Overseas

== Coaching and support staff ==
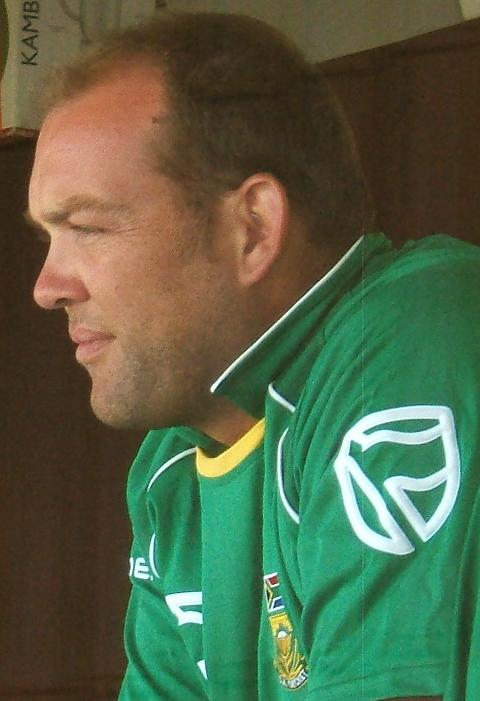
Kallis coached the team for the fourth season

- Head coach – Jacques Kallis
- Assistant coach – Simon Katich
- Bowling coach – Omkar Salvi
- Spin bowling coach - Carl Crowe
- Team manager - Wayne Bentley
- Strength and conditioning coach – Adrian le Roux
- Physiotherapist – Andrew Leipus

Ref

== Match results ==
=== League stage ===
24 March
16:00 (D/N)
Scorecard

Sunrisers Hyderabad; 181/3 (20 overs)	v	Kolkata Knight Riders (H); 183/4 (19.4 overs)
David Warner 85 (53); Andre Russell 2/32 (3 overs)		Nitish Rana 68 (47); Rashid Khan 1/26 (4 overs)

Kolkata won by 6 wickets
Eden Gardens, Kolkata
Umpires: Anil Chaudhary (Ind) and Chris Gaffaney (NZ)
Player of the match: Andre Russell (Kolkata Knight Riders)

- Kolkata Knight Riders won the toss and elected to field.

27 March
20:00 (D/N)
Scorecard

(H) Kolkata Knight Riders; 218/4 (20 overs)	v	Kings XI Punjab; 190/4 (20 overs)
Robin Uthappa 67* (50); Varun Chakravarthy 1/35 (3 overs)		David Miller 59* (40); Andre Russell 2/21 (3 overs)

Kolkata won by 28 runs
Eden Gardens, Kolkata
Umpires: Anil Chaudhary (Ind) and Vineet Kulkarni (Ind)
Player of the match: Andre Russell (Kolkata Knight Riders)

- Kings XI Punjab won the toss and elected to field.
- Varun Chakravarthy (Kings XI Punjab) made his T20 debut. His first over went for 25 runs, the highest number of runs conceded by a bowler on debut in the IPL.
- Sunil Narine (Kolkata Knight Riders) played in his 100th IPL match.
- Kolkata Knight Riders made their highest total at home in the IPL.

30 March
20:00 (D/N)
Scorecard

Kolkata Knight Riders; 185/8 (20 overs)	v	Delhi Capitals (H); 185/6 (20 overs)
Andre Russell 62 (28); Harshal Patel 2/40 (4 overs)		Prithvi Shaw 99 (55); Kuldeep Yadav 2/41 (4 overs)

Match tied (Delhi won the Super Over)
Feroz Shah Kotla Ground, Delhi
Umpires: Anil Dandekar (Ind) and Nitin Menon (Ind)
Player of the match: Prithvi Shaw (Delhi Capitals)

- Delhi Capitals won the toss and elected to field.

5 April
20:00 (D/N)
Scorecard

(H) Royal Challengers Bangalore; 205/3 (20 overs)	v	Kolkata Knight Riders; 206/5 (19.1 overs)
Virat Kohli 84 (49); Nitish Rana 1/22 (2 overs)		Andre Russell 48* (13); Pawan Negi 2/21 (3.1 overs)

Kolkata won by 5 wickets
M. Chinnaswamy Stadium, Bengaluru
Umpires: Anil Chaudhary (Ind) and Chris Gaffaney (NZ)
Player of the match: Andre Russell (Kolkata Knight Riders)

- Kolkata Knight Riders won the toss and elected to field.

7 April
20:00 (D/N)
Scorecard

(H) Rajasthan Royals; 139/3 (20 overs)	v	Kolkata Knight Riders; 140/2 (13.5 overs)
Steve Smith 73* (59); Harry Gurney 2/25 (4 overs)		Chris Lynn 50 (32); Shreyas Gopal 2/35 (4 overs)

Kolkata won by 8 wickets
Sawai Mansingh Stadium, Jaipur
Umpires: Anil Chaudhary (Ind) and Chris Gaffaney (NZ)
Player of the match: Harry Gurney (Kolkata Knight Riders)

- Kolkata Knight Riders won the toss and elected to field.

9 April
20:00 (D/N)
Scorecard

Kolkata Knight Riders; 108/9 (20 overs)	v	Chennai Super Kings (H); 111/3 (17.2 overs)
Andre Russell 50* (44); Deepak Chahar 3/20 (4 overs)		Faf du Plessis 43* (45); Sunil Narine 2/24 (3.2 overs)

Chennai won by 7 wickets
M. A. Chidambaram Stadium, Chennai
Umpires: Chettithody Shamshuddin (Ind) and Rod Tucker (Aus)
Player of the match: Deepak Chahar (Chennai Super Kings)

- Chennai Super Kings won the toss and elected to field.

12 April
20:00 (D/N)
Scorecard

(H) Kolkata Knight Riders; 178/7 (20 overs)	v	Delhi Capitals; 180/3 (18.5 overs)
Shubman Gill 65 (39); Chris Morris 2/38 (4 overs)		Shikhar Dhawan 97* (63); Nitish Rana 1/12 (2 overs)

Delhi won by 7 wickets
Eden Gardens, Kolkata
Umpires: Yeshwant Barde (Ind) and C. K. Nandan (Ind)
Player of the match: Shikhar Dhawan (Delhi Capitals)

- Delhi Capitals won the toss and elected to field.

14 April
16:00 (D/N)
Scorecard

(H) Kolkata Knight Riders; 161/8 (20 overs)	v	Chennai Super Kings; 162/5 (19.4 overs)
Chris Lynn 82 (51); Imran Tahir 4/27 (4 overs)		Suresh Raina 58* (42); Sunil Narine 2/19 (4 overs)

Chennai won by 5 wickets
Eden Gardens, Kolkata
Umpires: C. K. Nandan (Ind) and Rod Tucker (Aus)
Player of the match: Imran Tahir (Chennai Super Kings)

- Chennai Super Kings won the toss and elected to field.

19 April
20:00 (D/N)
Scorecard

Royal Challengers Bangalore; 213/4 (20 overs)	v	Kolkata Knight Riders (H); 203/5 (20 overs)
Virat Kohli 100 (58); Andre Russell 1/17 (3 overs)		Nitish Rana 85* (46); Dale Steyn 2/40 (4 overs)

Bangalore won by 10 runs
Eden Gardens, Kolkata
Umpires: Ian Gould (Eng) and Nitin Menon (Ind)
Player of the match: Virat Kohli (Royal Challengers Bangalore)

- Kolkata Knight Riders won the toss and elected to field.

21 April
16:00 (D/N)
Scorecard

Kolkata Knight Riders; 159/8 (20 overs)	v	Sunrisers Hyderabad (H); 161/1 (15 overs)
Chris Lynn 51 (47); Khaleel Ahmed 3/33 (4 overs)		Jonny Bairstow 80* (43); Prithvi Raj 1/29 (3 overs)

Hyderabad won by 9 wickets
Rajiv Gandhi International Cricket Stadium, Hyderabad
Umpires: Nigel Llong (Eng) and Nitin Menon (Ind)
Player of the match: Khaleel Ahmed (Sunrisers Hyderabad)

- Sunrisers Hyderabad won the toss and elected to field.

25 April
20:00 (D/N)
Scorecard

(H) Kolkata Knight Riders; 175/6 (20 overs)	v	Rajasthan Royals; 177/7 (19.2 overs)
Dinesh Karthik 97* (50); Varun Aaron 2/20 (4 overs)		Riyan Parag 47 (31); Piyush Chawla 3/20 (4 overs)

Rajasthan won by 3 wickets
Eden Gardens, Kolkata
Umpires: Anil Dandekar (Ind) and Ian Gould (Eng)
Player of the match: Varun Aaron (Rajasthan Royals)

- Rajasthan Royals won the toss and elected to field.

28 April
20:00 (D/N)
Scorecard

(H) Kolkata Knight Riders; 232/2 (20 overs)	v	Mumbai Indians; 198/7 (20 overs)
Andre Russell 80* (40); Hardik Pandya 1/31 (3 overs)		Hardik Pandya 91 (34); Andre Russell 2/25 (4 overs)

Kolkata won by 34 runs
Eden Gardens, Kolkata
Umpires: Ian Gould (Eng) and Nitin Menon (Ind)
Player of the match: Andre Russell (Kolkata Knight Riders)

- Mumbai Indians won the toss and elected to field.

3 May
20:00 (D/N)
Scorecard

(H) Kings XI Punjab; 183/6 (20 overs)	v	Kolkata Knight Riders; 185/3 (18 overs)
Sam Curran 55* (24); Sandeep Warrier 2/31 (4 overs)		Shubman Gill 65* (49); Mohammed Shami 1/15 (3 overs)

Kolkata won by 7 wickets
Punjab Cricket Association IS Bindra Stadium, Mohali
Umpires: Bruce Oxenford (Aus) and Chettithody Shamshuddin (Ind)
Player of the match: Shubman Gill (Kolkata Knight Riders)

- Kolkata Knight Riders won the toss and elected to field.

5 May
20:00 (D/N)
Scorecard

Kolkata Knight Riders; 133/7 (20 overs)	v	Mumbai Indians (H); 134/1 (16.1 overs)
Chris Lynn 41 (29); Lasith Malinga 3/35 (4 overs)		Rohit Sharma 55* (48); Prasidh Krishna 1/22 (3 overs)

Mumbai won by 9 wickets
Wankhede Stadium, Mumbai
Umpires: Nand Kishore (Ind) and C. K. Nandan (Ind)
Player of the match: Hardik Pandya (Mumbai Indians)

- Mumbai Indians won the toss and elected to field.
- Sunrisers Hyderabad qualified for the playoffs, becoming the first team ever to qualify with only 12 points, Kolkata Knight Riders were eliminated and Mumbai Indians advanced to Qualifier 1 as a result of this match.

== Statistics ==
=== Most runs ===
No.	Name	Match	Inns	NO	Runs	HS	Ave.	BF	SR	100s	50s	0	4s	6s
1	Andre Russell	14	13	4	510	80*	56.66	249	204.81	0	4	1	31	52
2	Chris Lynn	13	13	0	405	82	31.15	290	133.12	0	4	2	41	22
3	Nitish Rana	14	11	2	344	85*	34.40	235	146.38	0	3	1	27	21
4	Shubman Gill	14	13	4	296	76	32.88	238	124.36	0	3	0	21	10
5	Robin Uthappa	12	11	3	282	67*	31.33	245	115.10	0	1	1	28	10

- Source:Cricinfo

=== Most wickets ===
No.	Name	Match	Inns	Overs	Maidens	Runs	Wickets	BBI	Ave.	Econ.	SR	4W	5W
1	Andre Russell	14	12	28.0	0	287	11	2/21	26.09	9.51	16.4	0	0
2	Sunil Narine	12	12	44.2	1	347	10	2/19	34.70	7.82	26.6	0	0
3	Piyush Chawla	13	13	44.3	0	399	10	3/20	39.90	8.96	26.7	0	0
4	Harry Gurney	8	4	27.0	0	238	7	2/25	34.00	8.81	23.1	0	0
5	Kuldeep Yadav	9	9	33.0	0	286	4	2/41	71.50	8.66	49.5	0	0

- Source:Cricinfo

== Awards and achievements ==
No.	Date	Player	Opponent	Result	Contribution	Ref.
1	24 March 2019	Andre Russell	Sunrisers Hyderabad	Won By 6 wickets	49 runs off 19 balls	
2	27 March 2019	Andre Russell	Kings XI Punjab	Won By 28 runs	48 runs off 17 balls	
3	5 April 2019	Andre Russell	Royal Challengers Bangalore	Won By 5 Wickets	48* runs off 13 balls	
4	7 April 2019	Harry Gurney	Rajasthan Royals	Won By 8 Wickets	2/25 in 4 overs	
5	28 April 2019	Andre Russell	Mumbai Indians	Won By 34 runs	80* runs in 40 balls	
6	3 May 2019	Shubman Gill	Kings XI Punjab	Won By 7 Wickets	65 runs in 49 balls	
