= 2019 Chennai Super Kings season =

Indian Premier League cricket team season

Chennai Super Kings
2019 season
- Coach: Stephen Fleming
- Captain: MS Dhoni
- Ground(s): M.A.Chidambaram Stadium, Chennai
- IPL League: Runners-up
- Most runs: MS Dhoni (416)
- Most wickets: Imran Tahir (26)

Chennai Super Kings (CSK) are a franchise cricket team based in Chennai, Tamil Nadu, India, which plays in the Indian Premier League (IPL). They were one of the eight teams that competed in the 2019 Indian Premier League and were the defending champions, having won the 2018 Indian Premier League.

== Background ==
=== Player retention, transfers and auction ===
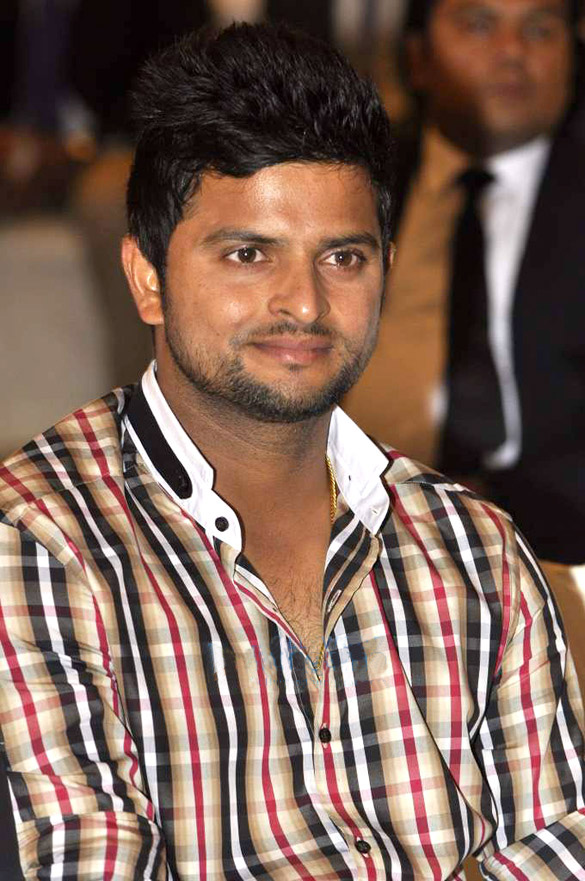
Suresh Raina became the first batsman to score 5,000 runs in the IPL in the opening match of IPL 2019

In November 2018, the Super Kings announced their list of retained players for the 2019 season. The list included Mahendra Singh Dhoni, Suresh Raina, Faf du Plessis, Murali Vijay, Ravindra Jadeja, Sam Billings, Mitchell Santner, David Willey, Dwayne Bravo, Shane Watson, Lungi Ngidi, Imran Tahir, Kedar Jadhav, Ambati Rayudu, Harbhajan Singh, Deepak Chahar, KM Asif, Karn Sharma, Dhruv Shorey, Narayan Jagadeesan, Shardul Thakur, Monu Kumar and Chaitanya Bishnoi.

On 18 December 2018, the IPL player auction was held in which the Super Kings signed two additional players, Mohit Sharma & Ruturaj Gaikwad.

=== Preseason ===
On 20 March 2019, the franchise announced that they would donate the proceeds from the tickets sales of their opening match of the season to the families of the CRPF personnel killed in the Pulwama attack.

A five part docu-drama on the Super Kings called Roar of the Lion was released on Hotstar on 20 March 2019.

=== Team analysis ===
The Indian Express wrote in its team preview that the Super Kings were among the favorites to win this season. Two of three editors at the National predicted the Super Kings to retain the title in 2019. According to Firstpost, the Super Kings will "bank on its batting strength to win games, like the previous year." News18 listed the experienced players and spinners suited for the Super Kings as the team strengths, while saying "the pace department is something which will make CSK slightly vulnerable." Sportstar pointed out that the average age of the squad at the end of the auction was 33.5 and remarked that the team will "once again bank on the experience of its Indian and international stars to make an instant impact."

== Squad ==
- Players with international caps are listed in **bold**.

No.	Name	Nationality	Birth date	Batting style	Bowling style	Year signed	Salary	Notes
Batsmen
1	**Murali Vijay**	India	1 April 1984 (aged 34)	Right-handed	Right-arm off break	2018	₹2 crore (US$209,000)	
3	**Suresh Raina**	India	27 November 1986 (aged 32)	Left-handed	Right-arm off break	2018	₹11 crore (US$1.2 million)	Vice-captain
9	**Ambati Rayudu**	India	23 September 1985 (aged 33)	Right-handed	Right-arm off break	2018	₹2.2 crore (US$230,000)	
13	**Faf du Plessis**	South Africa	13 July 1984 (aged 34)	Right-handed	Right-arm leg break	2018	₹1.6 crore (US$168,000)	Overseas
66	Dhruv Shorey	India	5 June 1992 (aged 26)	Right-handed	Right-arm off break	2018	₹20 lakh (US$21,000)	
81	**Kedar Jadhav**	India	26 March 1985 (aged 33)	Right-handed	Right-arm off break	2018	₹7.8 crore (US$816,809.00)	
31	Ruturaj Gaikwad	India	31 January 1997 (aged 22)	Right-handed		2019	₹20 lakh (US$21,000)	
All-rounders
8	**Ravindra Jadeja**	India	6 December 1988 (aged 30)	Left-handed	Slow left-arm orthodox	2018	₹7 crore (US$733,000)	
10	Chaitanya Bishnoi	India	25 August 1994 (aged 24)	Left-handed	Slow left-arm orthodox	2018	₹20 lakh (US$21,000)	
33	**Shane Watson**	Australia	17 June 1981 (aged 37)	Right-handed	Right-arm fast-medium	2018	₹4 crore (US$419,000)	Overseas
36	**Karn Sharma**	India	23 October 1987 (aged 31)	Left-handed	Right-arm leg break	2018	₹5 crore (US$524,000)	
47	**Dwayne Bravo**	Trinidad and Tobago	7 October 1983 (aged 35)	Right-handed	Right-arm medium-fast	2018	₹6.4 crore (US$670,000)	Overseas
72	**David Willey**	England	28 February 1990 (aged 29)	Left-handed	Left-arm fast	2018	₹2 crore (US$209,000)	Overseas
74	**Mitchell Santner**	New Zealand	5 February 1992 (aged 27)	Left-handed	Slow left-arm orthodox	2018	₹50 lakh (US$52,000)	Overseas
Wicket-keepers
7	**MS Dhoni**	India	7 July 1981 (aged 37)	Right-handed	Right-arm medium	2018	₹15 crore (US$1.6 million)	Captain
77	**Sam Billings**	England	15 June 1991 (aged 27)	Right-handed		2018	₹1 crore (US$105,000)	Overseas
17	Narayan Jagadeesan	India	24 April 1994 (aged 24)	Right-handed		2018	₹20 lakh (US$21,000)	
Bowlers
18	**Mohit Sharma**	India	18 September 1988 (aged 30)	Right-handed	Right-arm fast-medium	2019	₹5 crore (US$524,000)	
22	**Lungi Ngidi**	South Africa	29 March 1996 (aged 22)	Right-handed	Right-arm fast	2018	₹50 lakh (US$52,000)	Overseas
23	Monu Kumar	India	5 November 1994 (aged 24)	Right-handed	Right-arm medium	2018	₹20 lakh (US$21,000)	
24	KM Asif	India	24 July 1993 (aged 25)	Right-handed	Right-arm fast-medium	2018	₹40 lakh (US$42,000)	
27	**Harbhajan Singh**	India	3 July 1980 (aged 38)	Right-handed	Right-arm off break	2018	₹2 crore (US$209,000)	
30	**Scott Kuggeleijn**	New Zealand	3 January 1992 (aged 27)	Right-handed	Right-arm fast-medium	2019		Overseas
54	**Shardul Thakur**	India	16 October 1991 (aged 27)	Right-handed	Right-arm medium-fast	2018	₹2.6 crore (US$272,000)	
90	**Deepak Chahar**	India	7 August 1992 (aged 26)	Right-handed	Right-arm medium-fast	2018	₹80 lakh (US$84,000)	
99	**Imran Tahir**	South Africa	27 March 1979 (aged 39)	Right-handed	Right-arm leg break	2018	₹1 crore (US$105,000)	Overseas

== Coaching and support staff ==
- Head coach – Stephen Fleming
- Batting coach – Michael Hussey
- Bowling coach – Lakshmipathy Balaji
- Bowling consultant – Eric Simons
- Supportive Player – Shantanu Bhardwaj
- Physical trainer – Greg King
- Physio – Tommy Simsek
- Team manager – Russell Radhakrishnan
- Team doctor – Madhu

Source: Chennai Super Kings Couching and Supporting Staff List.

== League table ==
Pos	Team	Pld	W	L	NR	Pts	NRR	
1	Mumbai Indians (C)	14	9	5	0	18	0.421	Advanced to Qualifier 1
2	Chennai Super Kings (R)	14	9	5	0	18	0.131	Advanced to Qualifier 1
3	Delhi Capitals	14	9	5	0	18	0.044	Advanced to the Eliminator
4	Sunrisers Hyderabad	14	6	8	0	12	0.577	Advanced to the Eliminator
5	Kolkata Knight Riders	14	6	8	0	12	0.028	
6	Kings XI Punjab	14	6	8	0	12	−0.251	
7	Rajasthan Royals	14	5	8	1	11	−0.449	
8	Royal Challengers Bangalore	14	5	8	1	11	−0.607	

Source: ESPNCricinfo
The four top ranked teams qualify for the playoffs

=== Results ===
==== League stage ====
23 March
20:00 (D/N)
Scorecard

Royal Challengers Bangalore; 70 (17.1 overs)	v	Chennai Super Kings (H); 71/3 (17.4 overs)
Parthiv Patel 29 (35); Imran Tahir 3/9 (4 overs)		Ambati Rayudu 28 (42); Mohammed Siraj 1/5 (2 overs)

Chennai won by 7 wickets
M. A. Chidambaram Stadium, Chennai
Umpires: Anil Dandekar (Ind) and Bruce Oxenford (Aus)
Player of the match: Harbhajan Singh (Chennai Super Kings)

- Chennai Super Kings won the toss and elected to field.
- Suresh Raina (Chennai Super Kings) became the first batsman to score 5,000 runs in the IPL.
- Royal Challengers Bangalore made the lowest total for any team in the IPL against the Chennai Super Kings.

29 March
20:00 (D/N)
Scorecard

Rajasthan Royals; 198/2 (20 overs)	v	Sunrisers Hyderabad (H); 201/5 (19 overs)
Sanju Samson 102* (55); Rashid Khan 1/24 (4 overs)		David Warner 69 (37); Shreyas Gopal 3/27 (4 overs)

Hyderabad won by 5 wickets
Rajiv Gandhi International Cricket Stadium, Hyderabad
Umpires: Bruce Oxenford (Aus) and Chettithody Shamshuddin (Ind)
Player of the match: Rashid Khan (Sunrisers Hyderabad)

- Rajasthan Royals won the toss and elected to bat.
- This was Sunrisers Hyderabad's highest successful run chase in the IPL.

31 March
20:00 (D/N)
Scorecard

(H) Chennai Super Kings; 175/5 (20 overs)	v	Rajasthan Royals; 167/8 (20 overs)
MS Dhoni 75* (46); Jofra Archer 2/17 (4 overs)		Ben Stokes 46 (26); Deepak Chahar 2/19 (4 overs)

Chennai won by 8 runs
M. A. Chidambaram Stadium, Chennai
Umpires: Yeshwant Barde (Ind) and C. K. Nandan (Ind)
Player of the match: MS Dhoni (Chennai Super Kings)

- Rajasthan Royals won the toss and elected to field.

3 April
20:00 (D/N)
Scorecard

(H) Mumbai Indians; 170/5 (20 overs)	v	Chennai Super Kings; 133/8 (20 overs)
Suryakumar Yadav 59 (43); Ravindra Jadeja 1/10 (2 overs)		Kedar Jadhav 58 (54); Hardik Pandya 3/20 (4 overs)

Mumbai won by 37 runs
Wankhede Stadium, Mumbai
Umpires: Bruce Oxenford (Aus) and Rod Tucker (Aus)
Player of the match: Hardik Pandya (Mumbai Indians)

- Chennai Super Kings won the toss and elected to field.
- Mumbai Indians became the first team in the IPL to win 100 matches.

6 April 2019
16:00 (D/N)
Scorecard

(H) Chennai Super Kings; 160/3 (20 overs)	v	Kings XI Punjab; 138/5 (20 overs)
Faf du Plessis 54 (38); Ravichandran Ashwin 3/23 (4 overs)		Sarfaraz Khan 67 (59); Harbhajan Singh 2/17 (4 overs)

Chennai won by 22 runs
M. A. Chidambaram Stadium, Chennai
Umpires: K. N. Ananthapadmanabhan (Ind) and Rod Tucker (Aus)
Player of the match: Harbhajan Singh (Chennai Super Kings)

- Chennai Super Kings won the toss and elected to bat.

9 April
20:00 (D/N)
Scorecard

Kolkata Knight Riders; 108/9 (20 overs)	v	Chennai Super Kings (H); 111/3 (17.2 overs)
Andre Russell 50* (44); Deepak Chahar 3/20 (4 overs)		Faf du Plessis 43* (45); Sunil Narine 2/24 (3.2 overs)

Chennai won by 7 wickets
M. A. Chidambaram Stadium, Chennai
Umpires: Chettithody Shamshuddin (Ind) and Rod Tucker (Aus)
Player of the match: Deepak Chahar (Chennai Super Kings)

- Chennai Super Kings won the toss and elected to field.

11 April
20:00 (D/N)
Scorecard

(H) Rajasthan Royals; 151/7 (20 overs)	v	Chennai Super Kings; 155/6 (20 overs)
Ben Stokes 28 (26); Ravindra Jadeja 2/20 (4 overs)		MS Dhoni 58 (43); Ben Stokes 2/39 (3 overs)

Chennai won by 4 wickets
Sawai Mansingh Stadium, Jaipur
Umpires: Ulhas Gandhe (Ind) and Bruce Oxenford (Aus)
Player of the match: MS Dhoni (Chennai Super Kings)

- Chennai Super Kings won the toss and elected to field.

14 April
16:00 (D/N)
Scorecard

(H) Kolkata Knight Riders; 161/8 (20 overs)	v	Chennai Super Kings; 162/5 (19.4 overs)
Chris Lynn 82 (51); Imran Tahir 4/27 (4 overs)		Suresh Raina 58* (42); Sunil Narine 2/19 (4 overs)

Chennai won by 5 wickets
Eden Gardens, Kolkata
Umpires: C. K. Nandan (Ind) and Rod Tucker (Aus)
Player of the match: Imran Tahir (Chennai Super Kings)

- Chennai Super Kings won the toss and elected to field.

17 April
20:00 (D/N)
Scorecard

Chennai Super Kings; 132/5 (20 overs)	v	Sunrisers Hyderabad (H); 137/4 (16.5 overs)
Faf du Plessis 45 (31); Rashid Khan 2/17 (4 overs)		Jonny Bairstow 61* (44); Imran Tahir 2/20 (4 overs)

Hyderabad won by 6 wickets
Rajiv Gandhi International Cricket Stadium, Hyderabad
Umpires: Ulhas Gandhe (Ind) and Ian Gould (Eng)
Player of the match: David Warner (Sunrisers Hyderabad)

- Chennai Super Kings won the toss and elected to bat.

21 April
20:00 (D/N)
Scorecard

(H) Royal Challengers Bangalore; 161/7 (20 overs)	v	Chennai Super Kings; 160/8 (20 overs)
Parthiv Patel 53 (37); Deepak Chahar 2/25 (4 overs)		MS Dhoni 84* (48); Dale Steyn 2/29 (4 overs)

Bangalore won by 1 run
M. Chinnaswamy Stadium, Bangalore
Umpires: Vineet Kulkarni (Ind) and Rod Tucker (Aus)
Player of the match: Parthiv Patel (Royal Challengers Bangalore)

- Chennai Super Kings won the toss and elected to field.

23 April
20:00 (D/N)
Scorecard

Sunrisers Hyderabad; 175/3 (20 overs)	v	Chennai Super Kings (H); 176/4 (19.5 overs)
Manish Pandey 83* (49); Harbhajan Singh 2/39 (4 overs)		Shane Watson 96 (53); Bhuvneshwar Kumar 1/18 (4 overs)

Chennai won by 6 wickets
M. A. Chidambaram Stadium, Chennai
Umpires: Anil Chaudhary (Ind) and Nigel Llong (Eng)
Player of the match: Shane Watson (Chennai Super Kings)

- Chennai Super Kings won the toss and elected to field.

26 April
20:00 (D/N)
Scorecard

Mumbai Indians; 155/4 (20 overs)	v	Chennai Super Kings (H); 109 (17.4 overs)
Rohit Sharma 67 (48); Mitchell Santner 2/13 (4 overs)		Murali Vijay 38 (35); Lasith Malinga 4/37 (3.4 overs)

Mumbai won by 46 runs
M. A. Chidambaram Stadium, Chennai
Umpires: Anil Chaudhary (Ind) and Nigel Llong (Eng)
Player of the match: Rohit Sharma (Mumbai Indians)

- Chennai Super Kings won the toss and elected to field.

1 May
20:00 (D/N)
Scorecard

(H) Chennai Super Kings; 179/4 (20 overs)	v	Delhi Capitals; 99 (16.2 overs)
Suresh Raina 59 (37); Jagadeesha Suchith 2/28 (4 overs)		Shreyas Iyer 44 (31); Imran Tahir 4/12 (3.2 overs)

Chennai won by 80 runs
M. A. Chidambaram Stadium, Chennai
Umpires: Anil Dandekar (Ind) and Nitin Menon (Ind)
Player of the match: MS Dhoni (Chennai Super Kings)

- Delhi Capitals won the toss and elected to field.

5 May
16:00 (D/N)
Scorecard

Chennai Super Kings; 170/5 (20 overs)	v	Kings XI Punjab (H); 173/4 (18 overs)
Faf du Plessis 96 (55); Sam Curran 3/35 (4 overs)		K. L. Rahul 71 (36); Harbhajan Singh 3/57 (4 overs)

Punjab won by 6 wickets
Punjab Cricket Association IS Bindra Stadium, Mohali
Umpires: K. N. Ananthapadmanabhan (Ind) and Chettithody Shamshuddin (Ind)
Player of the match: K. L. Rahul (Kings XI Punjab)

- Kings XI Punjab won the toss and elected to field.
- Kings XI Punjab were eliminated and Chennai Super Kings advanced to Qualifier 1 as a result of this match.

==== Playoffs ====
Qualifier 1

7 May
19:30 (D/N)
Scorecard

Chennai Super Kings; 131/4 (20 overs)	v	Mumbai Indians; 132/4 (18.3 overs)
Ambati Rayudu 42* (37); Rahul Chahar 2/14 (4 overs)		Suryakumar Yadav 71* (54); Imran Tahir 2/33 (4 overs)

Mumbai Indians won by 6 wickets
M. A. Chidambaram Stadium, Chennai
Umpires: Nigel Llong (Eng) and Nitin Menon (Ind)
Player of the match: Suryakumar Yadav (Mumbai Indians)

- Chennai Super Kings won the toss and elected to bat.

Qualifier 2

10 May
19:30 (D/N)
Scorecard

Delhi Capitals; 147/9 (20 overs)	v	Chennai Super Kings; 151/4 (19 overs)
Rishabh Pant 38 (25); Dwayne Bravo 2/19 (4 overs)		Shane Watson 50 (32); Trent Boult 1/20 (4 overs)

Chennai Super Kings won by 6 wickets
Dr. Y. S. Rajasekhara Reddy ACA–VDCA Cricket Stadium, Visakhapatnam
Umpires: Bruce Oxenford (Aus) and Sundaram Ravi (Ind)
Player of the match: Faf du Plessis (Chennai Super Kings)

- Chennai Super Kings won the toss and elected to field.

==== Final ====
12 May
19:30 (D/N)
Scorecard

Mumbai Indians; 149/8 (20 overs)	v	Chennai Super Kings; 148/7 (20 overs)
Kieron Pollard 41* (25); Deepak Chahar 3/26 (4 overs)		Shane Watson 80 (59); Jasprit Bumrah 2/14 (4 overs)

Mumbai Indians won by 1 run
Rajiv Gandhi International Cricket Stadium, Hyderabad
Umpires: Ian Gould (Eng) and Nitin Menon (Ind)
Player of the match: Jasprit Bumrah (Mumbai Indians)

- Mumbai Indians won the toss and elected to bat.

== Statistics ==
=== Most runs ===
No.	Name	Matches	Inns	NO	Runs	HS	Ave.	BF	SR	100s	50s	0	4s	6s
1	MS Dhoni	15	12	7	416	84*	83.20	309	134.62	0	3	0	22	23
2	Shane Watson	17	17	0	398	96	23.41	312	127.56	0	3	3	42	20
3	Faf du Plessis	12	12	1	396	96	36.00	321	123.36	0	2	0	36	15
4	Suresh Raina	17	17	1	383	59	23.93	314	121.97	0	3	1	45	9
5	Ambati Rayudu	17	17	5	282	57	23.50	303	93.06	0	1	2	20	7

- Source:Cricinfo

=== Most wickets ===
No.	Name	Matches	Inns	Overs	Maidens	Runs	Wickets	BBI	Ave.	Econ.	SR	4W	5W
1	Imran Tahir	17	17	64.2	1	431	26	4/12	16.57	6.69	14.8	2	0
2	Deepak Chahar	17	17	64.3	2	482	22	3/20	21.90	7.47	17.5	0	0
3	Harbhajan Singh	11	11	44.0	1	312	16	3/20	19.50	7.05	16.5	0	0
4	Ravindra Jadeja	16	16	54.0	1	308	15	3/9	22.86	6.35	21.6	0	0
5	Dwayne Bravo	12	12	41.1	0	330	11	3/33	30.00	8.01	22.4	0	0

- Imran Tahir won the Purple Cap as the bowler who took the most wickets in the competition
- Source:Cricinfo

== Awards and achievements ==
=== Awards ===
Man of the Match

No.	Date	Player	Opponent	Result	Contribution	Ref.
1	March 23, 2019	Harbhajan Singh	Royal Challengers Bangalore	Won By 7 wickets	3/20 (4 overs)	
2	March 26, 2019	Shane Watson	Delhi Capitals	Won By 6 wickets	44 runs off 26 balls	
3	March 31, 2019	MS Dhoni	Rajasthan Royals	Won By 8 runs	75* runs in 46 balls	
4	April 6, 2019	Harbhajan Singh	Kings XI Punjab	Won By 22 runs	2/17 (4 overs)	
5	April 9, 2019	Deepak Chahar	Kolkata Knight Riders	Won By 7 Wickets	3/20 (4 overs)	
6	April 11, 2019	MS Dhoni	Rajasthan Royals	Won By 4 Wickets	58 runs in 43 balls	
7	April 14, 2019	Imran Tahir	Kolkata Knight Riders	Won By 5 Wickets	4/27 (4 overs)	
8	April 23, 2019	Shane Watson	Sunrisers Hyderabad	Won By 6 Wickets	96 runs in 53 balls	
9	May 1, 2019	MS Dhoni	Delhi Capitals	Won By 80 runs	44 runs in 22 balls	
10	May 10, 2019	Faf du Plessis	Delhi Capitals	Won By 6 Wickets	50 runs in 39 balls	
