= 2019 Royal Challengers Bangalore season =

12th season in IPL

Royal Challengers Bangalore
2019 season
- Coach: Gary Kirsten
- Captain: Virat Kohli
- Ground(s): M. Chinnaswamy Stadium, Bangalore
- League stage: 8th
- Most runs: Virat Kohli (464)
- Most wickets: Yuzvendra Chahal (18)

The 2019 season was the 12th season for the IPL cricket franchise Royal Challengers Bangalore. They were one of the eight teams that competed in the tournament. RCB continued under Kohli's captaincy and finished the season with five wins from 14 matches and 11 points.

== Background ==
=== Player retention, transfers and auction ===
In November 2018, the Royal Challengers announced their list of retained players for the 2019 season. The list included Virat Kohli, AB de Villiers, Parthiv Patel, Yuzvendra Chahal, Washington Sundar, Pawan Negi, Nathan Coulter-Nile, Moeen Ali, Mohammed Siraj, Colin de Grandhomme, Tim Southee, Umesh Yadav, Navdeep Saini, Kulwant Khejroliya and Marcus Stoinis.

On 18 December 2018, the IPL player auction was held in which the Royal Challengers signed up nine more players viz., Shivam Dube, Shimron Hetmyer, Akshdeep Nath, Prayas Barman, Himmat Singh, Gurkeerat Singh Mann, Heinrich Klaasen, Devdutt Padikkal and Milind Kumar. Their squad strength was 24 with 16 Indian and 8 overseas players.

Transfers
Quinton de Kock to Mumbai Indians; Mandeep Singh to Kings XI Punjab in return for Marcus Stoinis.

=== Team analysis ===
ESPNcricinfo editor Varun Shetty wrote in his team preview that the Royal Challengers "might struggle once more with their balance" despite the presence of several all-rounders in the squad and predicted that the team would make it to the playoffs if Kohli has "another season of big runs". According to the Indian Express, the team's strength is its batting lineup while the unavailability of overseas all-rounders for the entire season could be the weakness. The preview also stated that Kohli, whose captaincy was recently criticized by former cricketers, "will be eager to prove them wrong". The Times of India remarked that "Bowling, especially in the death overs, continues to be a cause for worry for RCB." News18 tipped Shimron Hetmyer as one of the five first-time overseas players to watch out for in the season, while the Hindu named Shivam Dube among the uncapped Indian players "who could create ripples" at the tournament.

== Squad ==
- Players with international caps are listed in **bold**.

No.	Name	Nationality	Birth date	Batting style	Bowling style	Year signed	Salary	Notes
Batsmen
10	Akshdeep Nath	India	10 May 1993 (aged 25)	Right-handed	Right-arm medium-fast	2019	₹3.6 crore (US$374,000)	Occasional wicket-keeper
14	Milind Kumar	India	15 February 1991 (aged 28)	Right-handed	Right-arm off break	2019	₹20 lakh (US$21,000)	
17	**AB de Villiers**	South Africa	17 February 1984 (aged 35)	Right-handed	Right-arm medium	2018	₹11 crore (US$1.1 million)	Overseas, Vice-captain
18	**Virat Kohli**	India	5 November 1988 (aged 30)	Right-handed	Right-arm medium	2018	₹17 crore (US$1.8 million)	Captain
29	**Gurkeerat Singh**	India	29 June 1990 (aged 28)	Right-handed	Right-arm off break	2019	₹50 lakh (US$52,000)	Occasional wicket-keeper
189	**Shimron Hetmyer**	Guyana	26 December 1996 (aged 22)	Left-handed	Right-arm leg break	2019	₹4 crore (US$415,000)	Overseas
—N/a	Himmat Singh	India	8 November 1996 (aged 22)	Right-handed	Right-arm medium	2019	₹65 lakh (US$67,000)	
—N/a	Devdutt Padikkal	India	7 July 2000 (aged 18)	Left-handed	Right-arm off break	2019	₹20 lakh (US$21,000)	
All-rounders
7	Shivam Dube	India	26 June 1993 (aged 25)	Left-handed	Right-arm medium-fast	2019	₹5 crore (US$519,000)	
8	**Moeen Ali**	England	18 June 1987 (aged 31)	Left-handed	Right-arm off break	2018	₹1.7 crore (US$177,000)	Overseas
16	**Marcus Stoinis**	Australia	16 August 1989 (aged 29)	Right-handed	Right-arm medium-fast	2019	₹6.2 crore (US$644,000)	Overseas
51	**Pawan Negi**	India	6 January 1993 (aged 26)	Left-handed	Slow left-arm orthodox	2018	₹1 crore (US$104,000)	
77	**Colin de Grandhomme**	New Zealand	22 July 1986 (aged 32)	Right-handed	Right-arm medium-fast	2018	₹2.2 crore (US$228,000)	Overseas
555	**Washington Sundar**	India	5 October 1999 (aged 19)	Left-handed	Right-arm off break	2018	₹3.2 crore (US$332,000)	
Wicket-keepers
45	**Heinrich Klaasen**	South Africa	30 July 1991 (aged 27)	Right-handed		2019	₹50 lakh (US$52,000)	Overseas
72	**Parthiv Patel**	India	9 March 1985 (aged 34)	Left-handed		2018	₹1.7 crore (US$177,000)	
Bowlers
3	**Yuzvendra Chahal**	India	23 July 1990 (aged 28)	Right-handed	Right-arm leg break googly	2018	₹6 crore (US$623,000)	
4	Kulwant Khejroliya	India	13 March 1992 (aged 27)	Left-handed	Left-arm medium-fast	2018	₹85 lakh (US$88,000)	
9	**Dale Steyn**	South Africa	27 June 1983 (aged 35)	Right-handed	Right-arm fast	2019	₹1.5 crore (US$156,000)	Overseas
13	**Mohammed Siraj**	India	13 March 1994 (aged 25)	Right-handed	Right-arm fast-medium	2018	₹2.6 crore (US$270,000)	
19	**Umesh Yadav**	India	25 October 1987 (aged 31)	Right-handed	Right-arm fast-medium	2018	₹4.2 crore (US$436,000)	
21	Prayas Ray Barman	India	25 October 2002 (aged 16)	Right-handed	Right-arm leg break	2019	₹1.5 crore (US$156,000)	
23	Navdeep Saini	India	23 November 1993 (aged 25)	Right-handed	Right-arm fast-medium	2018	₹3 crore (US$312,000)	
38	**Tim Southee**	New Zealand	11 December 1988 (aged 30)	Right-handed	Right-arm fast-medium	2018	₹1 crore (US$104,000)	Overseas
—N/a	**Nathan Coulter-Nile**	Australia	11 October 1987 (aged 31)	Right-handed	Right-arm fast	2018	₹2.2 crore (US$228,000)	Overseas

== Coaching and support staff ==
- Team and cricket operations manager - Avinash Vaidya
- Head coach - Gary Kirsten
- Assistant coaches - Mithun Manhas, NS Negi, Vikram Solanki, Kabir Ali
- Bowling coach - Ashish Nehra
- Physiotherapist - Evan Speechly

Ref

== Season ==
=== League table ===
Pos	Team	Pld	W	L	NR	Pts	NRR	
1	Mumbai Indians (C)	14	9	5	0	18	0.421	Advanced to Qualifier 1
2	Chennai Super Kings (R)	14	9	5	0	18	0.131	Advanced to Qualifier 1
3	Delhi Capitals	14	9	5	0	18	0.044	Advanced to the Eliminator
4	Sunrisers Hyderabad	14	6	8	0	12	0.577	Advanced to the Eliminator
5	Kolkata Knight Riders	14	6	8	0	12	0.028	
6	Kings XI Punjab	14	6	8	0	12	−0.251	
7	Rajasthan Royals	14	5	8	1	11	−0.449	
8	Royal Challengers Bangalore	14	5	8	1	11	−0.607	

Source: ESPNCricinfo
The four top ranked teams qualify for the playoffs

=== Results by match ===
Round	1	2	3	4	5	6	7	8	9	10	11	12	13	14
Ground	A	H	A	A	H	H	A	A	A	H	H	A	H	H
Result	L	L	L	L	L	L	W	L	W	W	W	L	D	W
Position	8	8	8	8	8	8	8	8	8	8	7	8	8	8

Source: Fixtures
A = Away; H = Home; W = Win; D = Draw; L = Loss

=== Results ===
23 March
20:00 (D/N)
Scorecard

Royal Challengers Bangalore; 70 (17.1 overs)	v	Chennai Super Kings (H); 71/3 (17.4 overs)
Parthiv Patel 29 (35); Imran Tahir 3/9 (4 overs)		Ambati Rayudu 28 (42); Mohammed Siraj 1/5 (2 overs)

Chennai won by 7 wickets
M. A. Chidambaram Stadium, Chennai
Umpires: Anil Dandekar (Ind) and Bruce Oxenford (Aus)
Player of the match: Harbhajan Singh (Chennai Super Kings)

- Chennai Super Kings won the toss and elected to field.
- Suresh Raina (Chennai Super Kings) became the first batsman to score 5,000 runs in the IPL.
- Royal Challengers Bangalore made the lowest total for any team in the IPL against the Chennai Super Kings.

28 March
20:00 (D/N)
Scorecard

Mumbai Indians; 187/8 (20 overs)	v	Royal Challengers Bangalore (H); 181/5 (20 overs)
Rohit Sharma 48 (33); Yuzvendra Chahal 4/38 (4 overs)		AB de Villiers 70* (41); Jasprit Bumrah 3/20 (4 overs)

Mumbai won by 6 runs
M. Chinnaswamy Stadium, Bengaluru
Umpires: C. K. Nandan (Ind) and Sundaram Ravi (Ind)
Player of the match: Jasprit Bumrah (Mumbai Indians)

- Royal Challengers Bangalore won the toss and elected to field.
- Virat Kohli (Royal Challengers Bangalore) became the second batsman to score 5,000 runs in the IPL.

31 March
16:00 (D/N)
Scorecard

(H) Sunrisers Hyderabad; 231/2 (20 overs)	v	Royal Challengers Bangalore; 113 (19.5 overs)
Jonny Bairstow 114 (56); Yuzvendra Chahal 1/44 (4 overs)		Colin de Grandhomme 37 (32); Mohammad Nabi 4/11 (4 overs)

Hyderabad won by 118 runs
Rajiv Gandhi International Cricket Stadium, Hyderabad
Umpires: K. N. Ananthapadmanabhan (Ind) and Sundaram Ravi (Ind)
Player of the match: Jonny Bairstow (Sunrisers Hyderabad)

- Royal Challengers Bangalore won the toss and elected to field.
- David Warner and Jonny Bairstow (Sunrisers Hyderabad) recorded the highest first-wicket partnership in the IPL (185 runs).
- Sunrisers Hyderabad recorded their highest total in the IPL.
- This was the largest winning margin for Sunrisers Hyderabad in terms of runs, and the second-largest defeat for Royal Challengers Bangalore in terms of runs.
- It was the second instance of two batsmen scoring hundreds in the same match in the IPL, and the fourth overall instance in a T20 match.
- Mohammad Nabi recorded the second-best bowling figures for Sunrisers Hyderabad in the IPL.

2 April
20:00 (D/N)
Scorecard

Royal Challengers Bangalore; 158/4 (20 overs)	v	Rajasthan Royals (H); 164/3 (19.5 overs)
Parthiv Patel 67 (41); Shreyas Gopal 3/12 (4 overs)		Jos Buttler 59 (43); Yuzvendra Chahal 2/17 (4 overs)

Rajasthan won by 7 wickets
Sawai Mansingh Stadium, Jaipur
Umpires: Anil Dandekar (Ind) and Marais Erasmus (SA)
Player of the match: Shreyas Gopal (Rajasthan Royals)

- Rajasthan Royals won the toss and elected to field.
- Virat Kohli (Royal Challengers Bangalore) played in his 100th IPL match as captain.

5 April
20:00 (D/N)
Scorecard

(H) Royal Challengers Bangalore; 205/3 (20 overs)	v	Kolkata Knight Riders; 206/5 (19.1 overs)
Virat Kohli 84 (49); Nitish Rana 1/22 (2 overs)		Andre Russell 48* (13); Pawan Negi 2/21 (3.1 overs)

Kolkata won by 5 wickets
M. Chinnaswamy Stadium, Bengaluru
Umpires: Anil Chaudhary (Ind) and Chris Gaffaney (NZ)
Player of the match: Andre Russell (Kolkata Knight Riders)

- Kolkata Knight Riders won the toss and elected to field.

7 April
16:00 (D/N)
Scorecard

(H) Royal Challengers Bangalore; 149/8 (20 overs)	v	Delhi Capitals; 152/6 (18.5 overs)
Virat Kohli 41 (33); Kagiso Rabada 4/21 (4 overs)		Shreyas Iyer 67 (50); Navdeep Saini 2/24 (4 overs)

Delhi won by 4 wickets
M. Chinnaswamy Stadium, Bengaluru
Umpires: Yeshwant Barde (Ind) and Sundaram Ravi (Ind)
Player of the match: Kagiso Rabada (Delhi Capitals)

- Delhi Capitals won the toss and elected to field.

13 April
20:00 (D/N)
Scorecard

(H) Kings XI Punjab; 173/4 (20 overs)	v	Royal Challengers Bangalore; 174/2 (19.2 overs)
Chris Gayle 99* (64); Yuzvendra Chahal 2/33 (4 overs)		Virat Kohli 67 (53); Ravichandran Ashwin 1/30 (4 overs)

Bangalore won by 8 wickets
Punjab Cricket Association IS Bindra Stadium, Mohali
Umpires: Ulhas Gandhe (Ind) and Sundaram Ravi (Ind)
Player of the match: AB de Villiers (Royal Challengers Bangalore)

- Royal Challengers Bangalore won the toss and elected to field.

15 April
20:00 (D/N)
Scorecard

Royal Challengers Bangalore; 171/7 (20 overs)	v	Mumbai Indians (H); 172/5 (19 overs)
AB de Villiers 75 (51); Lasith Malinga 4/31 (4 overs)		Quinton de Kock 40 (26); Moeen Ali 2/18 (4 overs)

Mumbai won by 5 wickets
Wankhede Stadium, Mumbai
Umpires: Marais Erasmus (SA) and Nitin Menon (Ind)
Player of the match: Lasith Malinga (Mumbai Indians

- Mumbai Indians won the toss and elected to field.

19 April
20:00 (D/N)
Scorecard

Royal Challengers Bangalore; 213/4 (20 overs)	v	Kolkata Knight Riders (H); 203/5 (20 overs)
Virat Kohli 100 (58); Andre Russell 1/17 (3 overs)		Nitish Rana 85* (46); Dale Steyn 2/40 (4 overs)

Bangalore won by 10 runs
Eden Gardens, Kolkata
Umpires: Ian Gould (Eng) and Nitin Menon (Ind)
Player of the match: Virat Kohli (Royal Challengers Bangalore)

- Kolkata Knight Riders won the toss and elected to field.

The Royal Challengers made 143 runs in the last 10 overs while batting, the most by any team in an IPL match.

21 April
20:00 (D/N)
Scorecard

(H) Royal Challengers Bangalore; 161/7 (20 overs)	v	Chennai Super Kings; 160/8 (20 overs)
Parthiv Patel 53 (37); Deepak Chahar 2/25 (4 overs)		MS Dhoni 84* (48); Dale Steyn 2/29 (4 overs)

Bangalore won by 1 run
M. Chinnaswamy Stadium, Bangalore
Umpires: Vineet Kulkarni (Ind) and Rod Tucker (Aus)
Player of the match: Parthiv Patel (Royal Challengers Bangalore)

- Chennai Super Kings won the toss and elected to field.

24 April
20:00 (D/N)
Scorecard

(H) Royal Challengers Bangalore; 202/4 (20 overs)	v	Kings XI Punjab; 185/7 (20 overs)
AB de Villiers 82* (44); Ravichandran Ashwin 1/15 (4 overs)		Nicholas Pooran 46 (28); Umesh Yadav 3/36 (4 overs)

Bangalore won by 17 runs
M. Chinnaswamy Stadium, Bengaluru
Umpires: Bruce Oxenford (Aus) and Chettithody Shamshuddin (Ind)
Player of the match: AB de Villiers (Royal Challengers Bangalore)

- Kings XI Punjab won the toss and elected to field.

28 April
16:00 (D/N)
Scorecard

(H) Delhi Capitals; 187/5 (20 overs)	v	Royal Challengers Bangalore; 171/7 (20 overs)
Shreyas Iyer 52 (37); Yuzvendra Chahal 2/41 (4 overs)		Parthiv Patel 39 (20); Amit Mishra 2/29 (4 overs)

Delhi won by 16 runs
Feroz Shah Kotla Ground, Delhi
Umpires: K. N. Ananthapadmanabhan (Ind) and Bruce Oxenford (Aus)
Player of the match: Shikhar Dhawan (Delhi Capitals)

- Delhi Capitals won the toss and elected to bat.
- Delhi Capitals qualified for the playoffs as a result of this match.

30 April
20:00 (D/N)
Scorecard

(H) Royal Challengers Bangalore; 62/7 (5 overs)	v	Rajasthan Royals; 41/1 (3.2 overs)
Virat Kohli 25 (7); Shreyas Gopal 3/12 (1 over)		Sanju Samson 28 (13); Yuzvendra Chahal 1/0 (0.2 overs)

No result
M. Chinnaswamy Stadium, Bengaluru
Umpires: Ulhas Gandhe (Ind) and Nigel Llong (Eng)

- Rajasthan Royals won the toss and elected to field.
- The match was reduced to 5 overs per side due to rain.
- Royal Challengers Bangalore were eliminated as a result of this match.
- Shreyas Gopal (Rajasthan Royals) took a hat-trick.

4 May
20:00 (D/N)
Scorecard

Sunrisers Hyderabad; 175/7 (20 overs)	v	Royal Challengers Bangalore (H); 178/6 (19.2 overs)
Kane Williamson 70* (43); Washington Sundar 3/24 (3 overs)		Shimron Hetmyer 75 (47); Khaleel Ahmed 3/37 (4 overs)

Bangalore won by 4 wickets
M. Chinnaswamy Stadium, Bengaluru
Umpires: Anil Chaudhary (Ind) and Nigel Llong (Eng)
Player of the match: Shimron Hetmyer (Royal Challengers Bangalore)

- Royal Challengers Bangalore won the toss and elected to field.

== Statistics ==
=== Most runs ===
No.	Name	Match	Inns	NO	Runs	HS	Ave.	BF	SR	100s	50s	0	4s	6s
1	Virat Kohli	14	14	0	464	100	33.14	328	141.46	1	2	0	46	13
2	AB de Villiers	13	13	3	442	82*	44.20	287	154.00	0	5	0	31	26
3	Parthiv Patel	14	14	0	373	67	26.64	268	139.17	0	2	1	48	10
4	Moeen Ali	11	10	2	220	66	27.50	133	165.41	0	2	0	16	17
5	Marcus Stoinis	10	10	6	211	46*	52.75	156	135.25	0	0	2	14	10

- Source:Cricinfo

=== Most wickets ===
No.	Name	Match	Inns	Overs	Maidens	Runs	Wickets	BBI	Ave.	Econ.	SR	4W	5W
1	Yuzvendra Chahal	14	14	49.2	1	386	18	4/38	21.44	7.82	16.4	1	0
2	Navdeep Saini	13	13	48.0	0	397	11	2/24	36.09	8.27	26.1	0	0
3	Umesh Yadav	11	11	37.5	0	371	8	3/36	46.37	9.80	28.3	0	0
4	Mohammed Siraj	9	9	28.1	1	269	7	2/38	38.42	9.55	24.1	0	0
5	Moeen Ali	11	9	25.0	0	169	6	2/18	28.16	6.76	25.0	0	0

- Source:Cricinfo
