= Anil Dandekar =

Indian cricket umpire (born 1968)

Personal information
- Full name: Anil Yashwant Dandekar
- Born: 3 May 1968 (age 58)
- Role: Umpire

Umpiring information
- WODIs umpired: 2 (2018)
- WT20Is umpired: 6 (2013–2016)
- Source: ESPNcricinfo, 30 April 2018

Anil Dandekar (born 3 May 1968) is an Indian cricket umpire. In India he has stood in matches in the 2015–16 Ranji Trophy, the 2015–16 Vijay Hazare Trophy and the 2015–16 Syed Mushtaq Ali Trophy. Outside of India, he has stood in matches in the 2015–16 Sunfoil Series in South Africa.
