= 2018 Rajasthan Royals season =

Indian Premier League cricket team season

Rajasthan Royals
2018 season
- Coach: Paddy Upton
- Captain: Ajinkya Rahane
- Ground(s): Sawai Mansingh Stadium, Jaipur
- IPL: 4th
- Most runs: Jos Buttler (548)
- Most wickets: Jofra Archer (15)

The 2018 season was the 9th season for the Indian Premier League franchise Rajasthan Royals.

== Offseason ==
=== Support staff changes ===
- In January 2018, former Royals team director Zubin Bharucha was appointed as the team's head of cricket
- In February 2018, former Royals captain Shane Warne was named team mentor
- In February 2018, Sairaj Bahutule was appointed spin bowling coach
- In March 2018, Amol Muzumdar and Dishant Yagnik were announced to be the team's batting coach and fielding coach respectively

=== Others ===
In January 2018, the BCCI cleared Sawai Mansingh Stadium in Jaipur to host the home matches of the Royals. The Royals had last played at Jaipur in 2013, after which they had to shift their base to Ahmedabad and Mumbai in 2014 and 2015 due to the BCCI's ban on the Rajasthan Cricket Association.

In March 2018, in an event in Jaipur, the franchise unveiled the new team anthem "Phir Halla Bol" by Ila Arun.

== Squad ==
- Players with international caps are listed in **bold**.

| No. | Name | Nationality | Birth date | Batting style | Bowling style | Year signed | Salary | Notes |
Batsmen
| 27 | **Ajinkya Rahane** | India | 5 June 1988 (aged 29) | Right-handed | Right-arm medium | 2018 | ₹4 crore (US$467,000) | Captain |
| 52 | Rahul Tripathi | India | 2 March 1991 (aged 27) | Right-handed | Right-arm medium | 2018 | ₹3.4 crore (US$397,000) | |
| — | **Steve Smith** | Australia | 2 June 1989 (aged 28) | Right-handed | Right-arm leg break | 2018 | ₹12 crore (US$1.4 million) | Overseas |
| — | Prashant Chopra | India | 7 October 1992 (aged 25) | Right-handed | Right-arm leg break | 2018 | ₹20 lakh (US$23,000) | |
| — | Aryaman Birla | India | 9 July 1997 (aged 20) | Left-handed | Slow left-arm orthodox | 2018 | ₹30 lakh (US$35,000) | |
All-rounders
| 6 | Mahipal Lomror | India | 16 November 1999 (aged 18) | Left-handed | Slow left-arm orthodox | 2018 | ₹20 lakh (US$23,000) | |
| 7 | Krishnappa Gowtham | India | 20 October 1988 (aged 29) | Right-handed | Right-arm off break | 2018 | ₹6.2 crore (US$724,000) | |
| 18 | Ankit Sharma | India | 20 April 1991 (aged 26) | Left-handed | Slow left-arm orthodox | 2018 | ₹20 lakh (US$23,000) | |
| 21 | **D'Arcy Short** | Australia | 9 August 1990 (aged 27) | Left-handed | Slow left-arm orthodox | 2018 | ₹4 crore (US$467,000) | Overseas |
| 37 | Shreyas Gopal | India | 4 September 1993 (aged 24) | Right-handed | Right-arm leg break | 2018 | ₹20 lakh (US$23,000) | |
| 55 | **Ben Stokes** | England | 4 June 1991 (aged 26) | Left-handed | Right-arm fast-medium | 2018 | ₹12.5 crore (US$1.5 million) | Overseas |
| 84 | **Stuart Binny** | India | 3 June 1984 (aged 33) | Right-handed | Right-arm medium | 2018 | ₹50 lakh (US$58,000) | |
| — | Jatin Saxena | India | 4 August 1982 (aged 35) | Right-handed | Right-arm leg break | 2018 | ₹20 lakh (US$23,000) | |
Wicket-keepers
| 8 | **Sanju Samson** | India | 11 November 1994 (aged 23) | Right-handed | | 2018 | ₹8 crore (US$934,082.20) | |
| 45 | **Heinrich Klaasen** | South Africa | 30 July 1991 (aged 26) | Right-handed | | 2018 | ₹50 lakh (US$58,000) | Overseas |
| 63 | **Jos Buttler** | England | 8 September 1990 (aged 27) | Right-handed | | 2018 | ₹4.4 crore (US$514,000) | Overseas |
Bowlers
| 22 | **Jofra Archer** | England | 1 April 1995 (aged 23) | Right-handed | Right-arm fast-medium | 2018 | ₹7.2 crore (US$840,674.00) | Overseas |
| 44 | Anureet Singh | India | 2 March 1988 (aged 30) | Right-handed | Right-arm medium | 2018 | ₹30 lakh (US$35,000) | |
| 56 | **Ben Laughlin** | Australia | 3 October 1982 (aged 35) | Right-handed | Right-arm fast-medium | 2018 | ₹50 lakh (US$58,000) | Overseas |
| 61 | **Ish Sodhi** | New Zealand | 31 October 1992 (aged 25) | Right-handed | Right-arm leg break | 2018 | ₹50 lakh (US$58,000) | Overseas |
| 77 | **Jaydev Unadkat** | India | 18 October 1991 (aged 26) | Right-handed | Left-arm medium | 2018 | ₹11.5 crore (US$1.3 million) | |
| 91 | **Dhawal Kulkarni** | India | 10 December 1988 (aged 29) | Right-handed | Right-arm medium | 2018 | ₹75 lakh (US$88,000) | |
| — | **Dushmantha Chameera** | Sri Lanka | 11 January 1992 (aged 26) | Right-handed | Right-arm fast | 2018 | ₹50 lakh (US$58,000) | Overseas |
| — | Zahir Khan Pakteen | Afghanistan | 20 December 1998 (aged 19) | Left-handed | Slow left-arm wrist-spin | 2018 | ₹60 lakh (US$70,000) | Overseas |
| — | Sudhesan Midhun | India | 7 October 1994 (aged 23) | Right-handed | Right-arm leg break | 2018 | ₹20 lakh (US$23,000) | |

== Season ==
=== League table ===
| Pos | Team | Pld | W | L | NR | Pts | NRR | |
|---|---|---|---|---|---|---|---|---|
| 1 | Sunrisers Hyderabad (RU) | 14 | 9 | 5 | 0 | 18 | 0.284 | Advanced to Qualifier 1 |
| 2 | Chennai Super Kings (C) | 14 | 9 | 5 | 0 | 18 | 0.253 | Advanced to Qualifier 1 |
| 3 | Kolkata Knight Riders (3) | 14 | 8 | 6 | 0 | 16 | −0.070 | Advanced to the Eliminator |
| 4 | Rajasthan Royals (4) | 14 | 7 | 7 | 0 | 14 | −0.250 | Advanced to the Eliminator |
| 5 | Mumbai Indians | 14 | 6 | 8 | 0 | 12 | 0.317 | |
| 6 | Royal Challengers Bangalore | 14 | 6 | 8 | 0 | 12 | 0.129 | |
| 7 | Kings XI Punjab | 14 | 6 | 8 | 0 | 12 | −0.502 | |
| 8 | Delhi Daredevils | 14 | 5 | 9 | 0 | 10 | −0.222 | |

Source: ESPNcricinfo
The four top ranked teams qualify for the playoffs.

=== Results ===
==== League matches ====
9 April
20:00 (D/N)
Scorecard

| Rajasthan Royals; 125/9 (20 overs) | v | Sunrisers Hyderabad (H); 127/1 (15.5 overs) |
| Sanju Samson 49 (42); Siddarth Kaul 2/17 (4 overs) | | Shikhar Dhawan 78* (57); Jaydev Unadkat 1/28 (3 overs) |

Sunrisers Hyderabad won by 9 wickets
Rajiv Gandhi International Cricket Stadium, Hyderabad
Umpires: Vineet Kulkarni (India) and Nigel Llong (England)
Player of the match: Shikhar Dhawan (Sunrisers Hyderabad)

- Sunrisers Hyderabad won the toss and elected to field.

11 April
20:00 (D/N)
Scorecard

| (H) Rajasthan Royals; 153/5 (17.5 overs) | v | Delhi Daredevils; 60/4 (6 overs) |
| Ajinkya Rahane 45 (40); Shahbaz Nadeem 2/34 (4 overs) | | Rishabh Pant 20 (14); Ben Laughlin 2/20 (2 overs) |

Rajasthan Royals won by 10 runs (DLS method)
Sawai Mansingh Stadium, Jaipur
Umpires: K. N. Ananthapadmanabhan (India) and Nitin Menon (India)
Player of the match: Sanju Samson (Rajasthan Royals)

- Delhi Daredevils won the toss and elected to field.
- Rain during play ended the Rajasthan Royals innings at 17.5 overs and Delhi Daredevils were set a target of 71 runs from 6 overs.

15 April
16:00 (D/N)
Scorecard

| Rajasthan Royals; 217/4 (20 overs) | v | Royal Challengers Bangalore (H); 198/6 (20 overs) |
| Sanju Samson 92* (45); Yuzvendra Chahal 2/22 (4 overs) | | Virat Kohli 57 (30); Shreyas Gopal 2/22 (4 overs) |

Rajasthan Royals won by 19 runs
M. Chinnaswamy Stadium, Bangalore
Umpires: Sundaram Ravi (India) and Chettithody Shamshuddin (India)
Player of the match: Sanju Samson (Rajasthan Royals)

- Royal Challengers Bangalore won the toss and elected to field.

18 April
20:00 (D/N)
Scorecard

| (H) Rajasthan Royals; 160/8 (20 overs) | v | Kolkata Knight Riders; 163/3 (18.5 overs) |
| D'Arcy Short 44 (43); Nitish Rana 2/11 (2 overs) | | Robin Uthappa 48 (36); Krishnappa Gowtham 2/23 (4 overs) |

Kolkata Knight Riders won by 7 wickets
Sawai Mansingh Stadium, Jaipur
Umpires: Abhijit Deshmukh (India) and Sundaram Ravi (India)
Player of the match: Nitish Rana (Kolkata Knight Riders)

- Kolkata Knight Riders won the toss and elected to field.

20 April
20:00 (D/N)
Scorecard

| (H) Chennai Super Kings; 204/5 (20 overs) | v | Rajasthan Royals; 140 (18.3 overs) |
| Shane Watson 106 (57); Shreyas Gopal 3/20 (4 overs) | | Ben Stokes 45 (37); Karn Sharma 2/13 (1.3 overs) |

Chennai Super Kings won by 64 runs
Maharashtra Cricket Association Stadium, Pune
Umpires: K. N. Ananthapadmanabhan (India) and Nitin Menon (India)
Player of the match: Shane Watson (Chennai Super Kings)

- Rajasthan Royals won the toss and elected to field.

22 April
20:00 (D/N)
Scorecard

| Mumbai Indians; 167/7 (20 overs) | v | Rajasthan Royals (H); 168/7 (19.4 overs) |
| Suryakumar Yadav 72 (47); Jofra Archer 3/23 (4 overs) | | Sanju Samson 52 (39); Hardik Pandya 2/25 (2.4 overs) |

Rajasthan Royals won by 3 wickets
Sawai Mansingh Stadium, Jaipur
Umpires: K. N. Ananthapadmanabhan (India) and Rod Tucker (Australia)
Player of the match: Jofra Archer (Rajasthan Royals)

- Mumbai Indians won the toss and elected to bat.

29 April
16:00 (D/N)
Scorecard

| Sunrisers Hyderabad; 151/7 (20 overs) | v | Rajasthan Royals (H); 140/6 (20 overs) |
| Kane Williamson 63 (43); Jofra Archer 3/26 (4 overs) | | Ajinkya Rahane 65* (53); Siddarth Kaul 2/23 (4 overs) |

Sunrisers Hyderabad won by 11 runs
Sawai Mansingh Stadium, Jaipur
Umpires: Nand Kishore (India) and Bruce Oxenford (Australia)
Player of the match: Kane Williamson (Sunrisers Hyderabad)

- Sunrisers Hyderabad won the toss and elected to bat.

2 May
20:00 (D/N)
Scorecard

| (H) Delhi Daredevils; 196/6 (17.1 overs) | v | Rajasthan Royals; 146/5 (12 overs) |
| Rishabh Pant 69 (29); Jaydev Unadkat 3/46 (4 overs) | | Jos Buttler 67 (26); Trent Boult 2/26 (3 overs) |

Delhi Daredevils won by 4 runs (DLS method)
Feroz Shah Kotla, Delhi
Umpires: C. K. Nandan (India) and Virender Sharma (India)
Player of the match: Rishabh Pant (Delhi Daredevils)

- Rajasthan Royals won the toss and elected to field.
- Rain before start of play reduced the match to 18 overs per side.
- Rain during play ended the Delhi Daredevils innings at 17.1 overs and Rajasthan Royals were set a target of 151 runs from 12 overs.

6 May
20:00 (D/N)
Scorecard

| Rajasthan Royals; 152/9 (20 overs) | v | Kings XI Punjab (H); 155/4 (18.4 overs) |
| Jos Buttler 51 (39); Mujeeb Ur Rahman 3/27 (4 overs) | | K. L. Rahul 84* (54); Krishnappa Gowtham 1/18 (3 overs) |

Kings XI Punjab won by 6 wickets
Holkar Cricket Stadium, Indore
Umpires: Sundaram Ravi (India) and Chettithody Shamshuddin (India)
Player of the match: Mujeeb Ur Rahman (Kings XI Punjab)

- Kings XI Punjab won the toss and elected to field.

8 May
20:00 (D/N)
Scorecard

| (H) Rajasthan Royals; 158/8 (20 overs) | v | Kings XI Punjab; 143/7 (20 overs) |
| Jos Buttler 82 (58); Andrew Tye 4/34 (4 overs) | | K. L. Rahul 95* (70); Krishnappa Gowtham 2/12 (3 overs) |

Rajasthan Royals won by 15 runs
Sawai Mansingh Stadium, Jaipur
Umpires: Marais Erasmus (South Africa) and Nitin Menon (India)
Player of the match: Jos Buttler (Rajasthan Royals)

- Rajasthan Royals won the toss and elected to bat.

11 May
20:00 (D/N)
Scorecard

| Chennai Super Kings; 176/4 (20 overs) | v | Rajasthan Royals (H); 177/6 (19.5 overs) |
| Suresh Raina 52 (35); Jofra Archer 2/42 (4 overs) | | Jos Buttler 95* (60); Shardul Thakur 1/22 (4 overs) |

Rajasthan Royals won by 4 wickets
Sawai Mansingh Stadium, Jaipur
Umpires: Yeshwant Barde (India) and Marais Erasmus (South Africa)
Player of the match: Jos Buttler (Rajasthan Royals)

- Chennai Super Kings won the toss and elected to bat.

13 May
20:00 (D/N)
Scorecard

| (H) Mumbai Indians; 168/6 (20 overs) | v | Rajasthan Royals; 171/3 (18 overs) |
| Evin Lewis 60 (42); Jofra Archer 2/16 (4 overs) | | Jos Buttler 94* (53); Hardik Pandya 2/52 (4 overs) |

Rajasthan Royals won by 7 wickets
Wankhede Stadium, Mumbai
Umpires: Nitin Menon (India) and Sundaram Ravi (India)
Player of the match: Jos Buttler (Rajasthan Royals)

- Rajasthan Royals won the toss and elected to field.

15 May
20:00 (D/N)
Scorecard

| Rajasthan Royals; 142 (19 overs) | v | Kolkata Knight Riders (H); 145/4 (18 overs) |
| Jos Buttler 39 (22); Kuldeep Yadav 4/20 (4 overs) | | Chris Lynn 45 (42); Ben Stokes 3/15 (4 overs) |

Kolkata Knight Riders won by 6 wickets
Eden Gardens, Kolkata
Umpires: Anil Chaudhary (India) and Kumar Dharmasena (Sri Lanka)
Player of the match: Kuldeep Yadav (Kolkata Knight Riders)

- Kolkata Knight Riders won the toss and elected to field.

19 May
16:00 (D/N)
Scorecard

| (H) Rajasthan Royals; 164/5 (20 overs) | v | Royal Challengers Bangalore; 134 (19.2 overs) |
| Rahul Tripathi 80* (58); Umesh Yadav 3/25 (4 overs) | | AB de Villiers 53 (35); Shreyas Gopal 4/16 (4 overs) |

Rajasthan Royals won by 30 runs
Sawai Mansingh Stadium, Jaipur
Umpires: Bruce Oxenford (Australia) and Virender Sharma (India)
Player of the match: Shreyas Gopal (Rajasthan Royals)

- Rajasthan Royals won the toss and elected to bat.
- Royal Challengers Bangalore were eliminated as a result of this match.
