= 2018 Kings XI Punjab season =

Indian Premier League cricket team season

Kings XI Punjab
2018 season
- Coach: Brad Hodge
- Captain: Ravichandran Ashwin
- Ground(s): Punjab Cricket Association IS Bindra Stadium, Mohali
- IPL: 7th
- Most runs: K. L. Rahul (659)
- Most wickets: Andrew Tye (24)

The 2018 season was the 11th season for the Indian Premier League franchise Kings XI Punjab.The team finished in 7th position and could not qualify for the playoffs.

== Offseason ==
=== Support staff changes ===
- In December 2017, Brad Hodge was appointed head coach of the team
- In March 2018, Venkatesh Prasad, Nishanta Bordoloi and Shyamal Vallabhjee were appointed bowling coach, fielding coach and technical coach respectively

=== Others ===
In December 2017, the franchise requested to move its home from Mohali to an alternative city. The Board of Cricket Control in India rejected the request after some members of the IPL Governing Council opposed the idea.

On 13 March 2018, Kings XI Punjab unveiled their official jersey for the season while Kent RO Systems was announced as the chief sponsor of the team in a joint press conference.

On 16 March 2018, the Punjab Cricket Association requested that the BCCI reschedule some of Kings XI Punjab's home matches as Chandigarh Airport was likely to remain shut from 12 May to 31 May due to maintenance work. The team was supposed to play four home matches at the Punjab Cricket Association IS Bindra Stadium in Mohali from 4 May to 14 May, whereas the earlier home matches in April were scheduled to be held at Indore. On 20 March 2018, the franchise revealed their revised schedule, with Mohali hosting the first three home matches and Indore hosting the remaining four.

== Squad ==
- Players with international caps are listed in **bold**.

No.	Name	Nationality	Birth date	Batting style	Bowling style	Year signed	Salary	Notes
Batsmen
5	**Aaron Finch**	Australia	17 November 1986 (aged 31)	Right-handed	Slow left-arm orthodox	2018	₹6.2 crore (US$724,000)	Overseas
10	**David Miller**	South Africa	10 June 1989 (aged 28)	Left-handed	Right-arm off break	2018	₹3 crore (US$350,000)	Overseas
13	Akshdeep Nath	India	10 May 1993 (aged 24)	Right-handed	Right-arm medium-fast	2018	₹1 crore (US$117,000)	
14	Mayank Agarwal	India	16 February 1991 (aged 27)	Right-handed		2018	₹1 crore (US$117,000)	
45	**Manoj Tiwary**	India	14 November 1985 (aged 32)	Right-handed	Right arm leg break	2018	₹1 crore (US$117,000)	
69	**Karun Nair**	India	6 December 1991 (aged 26)	Right-handed	Right-arm off break	2018	₹5.6 crore (US$654,000)	
333	**Chris Gayle**	Jamaica	21 September 1979 (aged 38)	Left-handed	Right-arm off break	2018	₹2 crore (US$234,000)	Overseas
All-rounders
12	**Yuvraj Singh**	India	12 December 1981 (aged 36)	Left-handed	Slow left-arm orthodox	2018	₹2 crore (US$234,000)	
35	Pardeep Sahu	India	21 August 1985 (aged 32)	Right-handed	Right-arm leg break	2018	₹20 lakh (US$23,000)	
62	Mayank Dagar	India	11 November 1996 (aged 21)	Right-handed	Slow left-arm orthodox	2018	₹20 lakh (US$23,000)	
21	Manzoor Dar	India	1 November 1993 (aged 24)	Right-handed	Right-arm off break	2018	₹20 lakh (US$23,000)	
Wicket-keepers
1	**KL Rahul**	India	18 April 1992 (aged 25)	Right-handed		2018	₹11 crore (US$1.3 million)	Vice Captain
Bowlers
3	Ankit Rajpoot	India	4 December 1993 (aged 24)	Right-handed	Right-arm medium-fast	2018	₹2.2 crore (US$257,000)	
18	**Mohit Sharma**	India	18 September 1988 (aged 29)	Right-handed	Right-arm medium-fast	2018	₹2.4 crore (US$280,000)	
23	**Ravichandran Ashwin**	India	17 September 1986 (aged 31)	Right-handed	Right-arm off break	2018	₹7.6 crore (US$887,378.10)	Captain
27	Ben Dwarshuis	Australia	23 June 1994 (aged 23)	Left-handed	Left-arm fast-medium	2018	₹1.4 crore (US$163,000)	Overseas
51	**Barinder Sran**	India	10 December 1992 (aged 25)	Left-handed	Left-arm medium-fast	2018	₹3 crore (US$350,000)	
68	**Andrew Tye**	Australia	12 December 1986 (aged 31)	Right-handed	Right-arm medium-fast	2018	₹7.2 crore (US$840,674.00)	Overseas
88	**Mujeeb Ur Rahman**	Afghanistan	28 March 2001 (aged 17)	Right-handed	Right-arm off break	2018	₹4 crore (US$467,000)	Overseas

== Administration and coaching staff ==
- Owners - Ness Wadia, Preity Zinta, Mohit Burman, Karan Paul
- Chief Executive Officer - Satish Menon
- Chief Operating Officer - Rajeev Khanna
- Team manager - Major Varoon Parmar
- Head of cricket operations and strategy - Virender Sehwag
- Head coach - Brad Hodge
- Assistant coach - Mithun Manhas
- Bowling coach - Venkatesh Prasad
- Fielding coach - Nishanta Bordoloi
- Strength & conditioning coach - Nishant Thakur
- Video analyst - Ashish Tuli
- Physiotherapist – Amit Tyagi

== Season ==
=== League table ===
Pos	Team	Pld	W	L	NR	Pts	NRR	
1	Sunrisers Hyderabad (RU)	14	9	5	0	18	0.284	Advanced to Qualifier 1
2	Chennai Super Kings (C)	14	9	5	0	18	0.253	Advanced to Qualifier 1
3	Kolkata Knight Riders (3)	14	8	6	0	16	−0.070	Advanced to the Eliminator
4	Rajasthan Royals (4)	14	7	7	0	14	−0.250	Advanced to the Eliminator
5	Mumbai Indians	14	6	8	0	12	0.317	
6	Royal Challengers Bangalore	14	6	8	0	12	0.129	
7	Kings XI Punjab	14	6	8	0	12	−0.502	
8	Delhi Daredevils	14	5	9	0	10	−0.222	

Source: ESPNcricinfo
The four top ranked teams qualify for the playoffs.

=== Results ===
All times are in Indian Standard Time (UTC+05:30)

8 April
16:00 (D/N)
Scorecard

Delhi Daredevils; 166/7 (20 overs)	v	Kings XI Punjab (H); 167/4 (18.5 overs)
Gautam Gambhir 55 (42); Mujeeb Ur Rahman 2/28 (4 overs)		K. L. Rahul 51 (16); Daniel Christian 1/12 (2 overs)

Kings XI Punjab won by 6 wickets
Punjab Cricket Association Stadium, Mohali
Umpires: K. N. Ananthapadmanabhan (India) and Rod Tucker (Australia)
Player of the match: K. L. Rahul (Kings XI Punjab)

- Kings XI Punjab won the toss and elected to field.
- Mujeeb Ur Rahman (Kings XI Punjab) became the youngest cricketer to play in the IPL.
- K. L. Rahul (Kings XI Punjab) scored the fastest fifty in the IPL.

13 April
20:00 (D/N)
Scorecard

Kings XI Punjab; 155 (19.2 overs)	v	Royal Challengers Bangalore (H); 159/6 (19.3 overs)
K. L. Rahul 47 (30); Umesh Yadav 3/23 (4 overs)		AB de Villiers 57 (40); Ravichandran Ashwin 2/30 (4 overs)

Royal Challengers Bangalore won by 4 wickets
M. Chinnaswamy Stadium, Bangalore
Umpires: Abhijit Deshmukh (India) and Sundaram Ravi (India)
Player of the match: Umesh Yadav (Royal Challengers Bangalore)

- Royal Challengers Bangalore won the toss and elected to field.

15 April
20:00 (D/N)
Scorecard

(H) Kings XI Punjab; 197/7 (20 overs)	v	Chennai Super Kings; 193/5 (20 overs)
Chris Gayle 63 (33); Shardul Thakur 2/33 (3 overs)		MS Dhoni 79* (44); Andrew Tye 2/47 (4 overs)

Kings XI Punjab won by 4 runs
Punjab Cricket Association Stadium, Mohali
Umpires: Vineet Kulkarni (India) and C. K. Nandan (India)
Player of the match: Chris Gayle (Kings XI Punjab)

- Chennai Super Kings won the toss and elected to field.

19 April
20:00 (D/N)
Scorecard

(H) Kings XI Punjab; 193/3 (20 overs)	v	Sunrisers Hyderabad; 178/4 (20 overs)
Chris Gayle 104* (63); Bhuvneshwar Kumar 1/25 (4 overs)		Manish Pandey 57* (42); Andrew Tye 2/23 (4 overs)

Kings XI Punjab won by 15 runs
Punjab Cricket Association Stadium, Mohali
Umpires: Anil Chaudhary (India) and Nigel Llong (England)
Player of the match: Chris Gayle (Kings XI Punjab)

- Kings XI Punjab won the toss and elected to bat.

21 April
16:00 (D/N)
Scorecard

(H) Kolkata Knight Riders; 191/7 (20 overs)	v	Kings XI Punjab; 126/1 (11.1 overs)
Chris Lynn 74 (41); Andrew Tye 2/30 (4 overs)		Chris Gayle 62* (38); Sunil Narine 1/23 (3 overs)

Kings XI Punjab won by 9 wickets (DLS method)
Eden Gardens, Kolkata
Umpires: Abhijit Deshmukh (India) and Chettithody Shamshuddin (India)
Player of the match: K. L. Rahul (Kings XI Punjab)

- Kings XI Punjab won the toss and elected to field.
- Rain interrupted play after 8.2 overs of the Kings XI Punjab innings and the target was revised to 125 runs from 13 overs.

23 April
20:00 (D/N)
Scorecard

Kings XI Punjab; 143/8 (20 overs)	v	Delhi Daredevils (H); 139/8 (20 overs)
Karun Nair 34 (32); Liam Plunkett 3/17 (4 overs)		Shreyas Iyer 57 (45); Ankit Rajpoot 2/23 (4 overs)

Kings XI Punjab won by 4 runs
Feroz Shah Kotla, Delhi
Umpires: C. K. Nandan (India) and Nand Kishore (India)
Player of the match: Ankit Rajpoot (Kings XI Punjab)

- Delhi Daredevils won the toss and elected to field.
- Prithvi Shaw (Delhi Daredevils) made his T20 debut.

26 April
20:00 (D/N)
Scorecard

(H) Sunrisers Hyderabad; 132/6 (20 overs)	v	Kings XI Punjab; 119 (19.2 overs)
Manish Pandey 54 (51); Ankit Rajpoot 5/14 (4 overs)		K. L. Rahul 32 (26); Rashid Khan 3/19 (4 overs)

Sunrisers Hyderabad won by 13 runs
Rajiv Gandhi International Cricket Stadium, Hyderabad
Umpires: Yeshwant Barde (India) and C. K. Nandan (India)
Player of the match: Ankit Rajpoot (Kings XI Punjab)

- Kings XI Punjab won the toss and elected to field.

4 May
20:00 (D/N)
Scorecard

(H) Kings XI Punjab; 174/6 (20 overs)	v	Mumbai Indians; 176/4 (19 overs)
Chris Gayle 50 (40); Jasprit Bumrah 1/19 (4 overs)		Suryakumar Yadav 57 (42); Mujeeb Ur Rahman 2/37 (4 overs)

Mumbai Indians won by 6 wickets
Holkar Cricket Stadium, Indore
Umpires: Anil Dandekar (India) and Sundaram Ravi (India)
Player of the match: Suryakumar Yadav (Mumbai Indians)

- Mumbai Indians won the toss and elected to field.

6 May
20:00 (D/N)
Scorecard

Rajasthan Royals; 152/9 (20 overs)	v	Kings XI Punjab (H); 155/4 (18.4 overs)
Jos Buttler 51 (39); Mujeeb Ur Rahman 3/27 (4 overs)		K. L. Rahul 84* (54); Krishnappa Gowtham 1/18 (3 overs)

Kings XI Punjab won by 6 wickets
Holkar Cricket Stadium, Indore
Umpires: Sundaram Ravi (India) and Chettithody Shamshuddin (India)
Player of the match: Mujeeb Ur Rahman (Kings XI Punjab)

- Kings XI Punjab won the toss and elected to field.

8 May
20:00 (D/N)
Scorecard

(H) Rajasthan Royals; 158/8 (20 overs)	v	Kings XI Punjab; 143/7 (20 overs)
Jos Buttler 82 (58); Andrew Tye 4/34 (4 overs)		K. L. Rahul 95* (70); Krishnappa Gowtham 2/12 (3 overs)

Rajasthan Royals won by 15 runs
Sawai Mansingh Stadium, Jaipur
Umpires: Marais Erasmus (South Africa) and Nitin Menon (India)
Player of the match: Jos Buttler (Rajasthan Royals)

- Rajasthan Royals won the toss and elected to bat.

12 May
16:00 (D/N)
Scorecard

Kolkata Knight Riders; 245/6 (20 overs)	v	Kings XI Punjab (H); 214/8 (20 overs)
Sunil Narine 75 (36); Andrew Tye 4/41 (4 overs)		K. L. Rahul 66 (29); Andre Russell 3/41 (4 overs)

Kolkata Knight Riders won by 31 runs
Holkar Cricket Stadium, Indore
Umpires: C. K. Nandan (India) and Virender Sharma (India)
Player of the match: Sunil Narine (Kolkata Knight Riders)

- Kings XI Punjab won the toss and elected to field.

14 May
20:00 (D/N)
Scorecard

(H) Kings XI Punjab; 88 (15.1 overs)	v	Royal Challengers Bangalore; 92/0 (8.1 overs)
Aaron Finch 26 (23); Umesh Yadav 3/23 (4 overs)		Virat Kohli 48* (28); Ravichandran Ashwin 0/9 (1 over)

Royal Challengers Bangalore won by 10 wickets
Holkar Cricket Stadium, Indore
Umpires: Bruce Oxenford (Australia) and Virender Sharma (India)
Player of the match: Umesh Yadav (Royal Challengers Bangalore)

- Royal Challengers Bangalore won the toss and elected to field.
- Chennai Super Kings qualified for the playoffs and Sunrisers Hyderabad advanced to Qualifier 1 as a result of this match.

16 May
20:00 (D/N)
Scorecard

(H) Mumbai Indians; 186/8 (20 overs)	v	Kings XI Punjab; 183/5 (20 overs)
Kieron Pollard 50 (23); Andrew Tye 4/16 (4 overs)		K. L. Rahul 94 (60); Jasprit Bumrah 3/15 (4 overs)

Mumbai Indians won by 3 runs
Wankhede Stadium, Mumbai
Umpires: Marais Erasmus (South Africa) and Nitin Menon (India)
Player of the match: Jasprit Bumrah (Mumbai Indians)

- Kings XI Punjab won the toss and elected to field.

20 May
20:00 (D/N)
Scorecard

Kings XI Punjab; 153 (19.4 overs)	v	Chennai Super Kings (H); 159/5 (19.1 overs)
Karun Nair 54 (26); Lungi Ngidi 4/10 (4 overs)		Suresh Raina 61* (48); Ankit Rajpoot 2/19 (4 overs)

Chennai Super Kings won by 5 wickets
Maharashtra Cricket Association Stadium, Pune
Umpires: Yeshwant Barde (India) and Nitin Menon (India)
Player of the match: Lungi Ngidi (Chennai Super Kings)

- Chennai Super Kings won the toss and elected to field.
- Rajasthan Royals qualified for the playoffs, Kings XI Punjab were eliminated and Chennai Super Kings advanced to Qualifier 1 as a result of this match.
