= 2018 Royal Challengers Bangalore season =

Indian Premier League cricket team season

Royal Challengers Bangalore
2018 season
- Coach: Daniel Vettori
- Captain: Virat Kohli
- Ground(s): M.Chinnaswamy Stadium, Bangalore
- League stage: 6th
- Most runs: Virat Kohli (530)
- Most wickets: Umesh Yadav (20)

The 2018 season was the 11th season for Royal Challengers Bangalore. The side was captained by Virat Kohli and coached by Daniel Vettori.

== Pre-season ==
In January 2018, the franchise appointed Gary Kirsten as batting coach and Ashish Nehra as the bowling mentor.

On 26 March 2018, the franchise onboarded HP Inc India as the principal sponsor of the team. Earlier that month, the franchise had partnered up with Nuvoco Vistas for the solus position on the back of the team jersey.

On 29 March 2018, Royal Challengers Bangalore's home match against Delhi Daredevils on 12 May was moved to Delhi due to the Karnataka Legislative Assembly election on the same day. The away game against the same team on 21 April was moved to Bangalore.

== Squad ==
- Players with international caps are listed in **bold**.

No.	Name	Nationality	Birth date	Batting style	Bowling style	Year signed	Salary	Notes
Batsmen
9	**Mandeep Singh**	India	18 December 1991 (aged 26)	Right-handed	Right-arm medium	2018	₹1.4 crore (US$145,000)	
17	**AB de Villiers**	South Africa	17 February 1984 (aged 34)	Right-handed	Right-arm medium	2018	₹11 crore (US$1.1 million)	Overseas/Vice Captain
18	**Virat Kohli**	India	5 November 1988 (aged 29)	Right-handed	Right-arm medium	2018	₹17 crore (US$1.8 million)	Captain
36	Manan Vohra	India	18 July 1993 (aged 24)	Right-handed	Right-arm medium	2018	₹1.1 crore (US$114,000)	
42	**Brendon McCullum**	New Zealand	27 September 1981 (aged 36)	Right-handed	Right-arm medium	2018	₹3.6 crore (US$374,000)	Overseas
97	Sarfaraz Khan	India	27 October 1997 (aged 20)	Right-handed	Right-arm off break	2018	₹1.75 crore (US$182,000)	
All-rounders
6	**Pawan Negi**	India	6 January 1993 (aged 25)	Left-handed	Slow left-arm orthodox	2018	₹1 crore (US$104,000)	
8	**Moeen Ali**	England	18 June 1987 (aged 30)	Left-handed	Right-arm off break	2018	₹1.7 crore (US$177,000)	Overseas
10	**Chris Woakes**	England	2 March 1989 (aged 29)	Right-handed	Right-arm fast-medium	2018	₹7.4 crore (US$768,434.50)	Overseas
77	**Colin de Grandhomme**	New Zealand	22 July 1986 (aged 31)	Right-handed	Right-arm medium-fast	2018	₹2.2 crore (US$228,000)	Overseas
78	**Corey Anderson**	New Zealand	13 December 1990 (aged 27)	Left-handed	Left-arm fast-medium	2018	₹2 crore (US$210,000)	Overseas
555	**Washington Sundar**	India	5 October 1999 (aged 18)	Left-handed	Right-arm off break	2018	₹3.2 crore (US$332,000)	
—N/a	Pavan Deshpande	India	16 September 1989 (aged 28)	Left-handed	Right-arm off break	2018	₹20 lakh (US$21,000)	
—N/a	Aniruddha Joshi	India	7 November 1987 (aged 30)	Right-handed	Right-arm off break	2018	₹20 lakh (US$21,000)	
Wicket-keepers
69	**Quinton de Kock**	South Africa	17 December 1992 (aged 25)	Left-handed		2018	₹2.8 crore (US$291,000)	Overseas
72	**Parthiv Patel**	India	9 March 1985 (aged 33)	Left-handed		2018	₹1.7 crore (US$177,000)	
Bowlers
3	**Yuzvendra Chahal**	India	23 July 1990 (aged 27)	Right-handed	Right-arm leg break googly	2018	₹6 crore (US$623,000)	
4	Kulwant Khejroliya	India	13 March 1992 (aged 26)	Left-handed	Left-arm medium-fast	2018	₹85 lakh (US$88,000)	
19	**Umesh Yadav**	India	25 October 1987 (aged 30)	Right-handed	Right-arm fast-medium	2018	₹4.2 crore (US$436,000)	
21	**Mohammed Siraj**	India	13 March 1994 (aged 24)	Right-handed	Right-arm fast-medium	2018	₹2.6 crore (US$270,000)	
38	**Tim Southee**	New Zealand	11 December 1988 (aged 29)	Right-handed	Right-arm fast-medium	2018	₹1 crore (US$104,000)	Overseas
89	Murugan Ashwin	India	8 September 1990 (aged 27)	Right-handed	Right-arm leg break googly	2018	₹2.2 crore (US$228,000)	
—N/a	**Nathan Coulter-Nile**	Australia	11 October 1987 (aged 30)	Right-handed	Right-arm fast	2018	₹2.2 crore (US$228,000)	Overseas
—N/a	Navdeep Saini	India	23 November 1993 (aged 24)	Right-handed	Right-arm medium-fast	2018	₹3 crore (US$312,000)	
—N/a	Aniket Choudhary	India	28 January 1990 (aged 28)	Right-handed	Left-arm medium-fast	2018	₹30 lakh (US$31,000)	

== Personnel ==
- Owner – United Spirits
- Head coach – Daniel Vettori
- Bowling mentor – Ashish Nehra
- Batting coach - Gary Kirsten
- Fielding Coach - Trent Woodhill
- Bowling Talent Development and Analytics - Andrew McDonald

== Season ==
=== League table ===
Pos	Team	Pld	W	L	NR	Pts	NRR	
1	Sunrisers Hyderabad (RU)	14	9	5	0	18	0.284	Advanced to Qualifier 1
2	Chennai Super Kings (C)	14	9	5	0	18	0.253	Advanced to Qualifier 1
3	Kolkata Knight Riders (3)	14	8	6	0	16	−0.070	Advanced to the Eliminator
4	Rajasthan Royals (4)	14	7	7	0	14	−0.250	Advanced to the Eliminator
5	Mumbai Indians	14	6	8	0	12	0.317	
6	Royal Challengers Bangalore	14	6	8	0	12	0.129	
7	Kings XI Punjab	14	6	8	0	12	−0.502	
8	Delhi Daredevils	14	5	9	0	10	−0.222	

Source: ESPNcricinfo
The four top ranked teams qualify for the playoffs.

=== Results ===
8 April 2018
20:00 (D/N)
Scorecard

Royal Challengers Bangalore; 176/7 (20 overs)	v	Kolkata Knight Riders (H); 177/6 (18.5 overs)
AB de Villiers 44 (23); Nitish Rana 2/11 (1 over)		Sunil Narine 50 (19); Chris Woakes 3/36 (4 overs)

Kolkata Knight Riders won by 4 wickets
Eden Gardens, Kolkata
Umpires: Abhijit Deshmukh (India) and Chettithody Shamshuddin (India)
Player of the match: Sunil Narine (Kolkata Knight Riders)

- Kolkata Knight Riders won the toss and elected to field.
- Brendon McCullum (Royal Challengers Bangalore) scored his 9,000th T20 run.

13 April 2018
20:00 (D/N)
Scorecard

Kings XI Punjab; 155 (19.2 overs)	v	Royal Challengers Bangalore (H); 159/6 (19.3 overs)
K. L. Rahul 47 (30); Umesh Yadav 3/23 (4 overs)		AB de Villiers 57 (40); Ravichandran Ashwin 2/30 (4 overs)

Royal Challengers Bangalore won by 4 wickets
M. Chinnaswamy Stadium, Bangalore
Umpires: Abhijit Deshmukh (India) and Sundaram Ravi (India)
Player of the match: Umesh Yadav (Royal Challengers Bangalore)

- Royal Challengers Bangalore won the toss and elected to field.

15 April 2018
16:00 (D/N)
Scorecard

Rajasthan Royals; 217/4 (20 overs)	v	Royal Challengers Bangalore (H); 198/6 (20 overs)
Sanju Samson 92* (45); Yuzvendra Chahal 2/22 (4 overs)		Virat Kohli 57 (30); Shreyas Gopal 2/22 (4 overs)

Rajasthan Royals won by 19 runs
M. Chinnaswamy Stadium, Bangalore
Umpires: Sundaram Ravi (India) and Chettithody Shamshuddin (India)
Player of the match: Sanju Samson (Rajasthan Royals)

- Royal Challengers Bangalore won the toss and elected to field.

17 April 2018
20:00 (D/N)
Scorecard

(H) Mumbai Indians; 213/6 (20 overs)	v	Royal Challengers Bangalore; 167/8 (20 overs)
Rohit Sharma 94 (52); Umesh Yadav 2/36 (4 overs)		Virat Kohli 92* (62); Krunal Pandya 3/28 (4 overs)

Mumbai Indians won by 46 runs
Wankhede Stadium, Mumbai
Umpires: Nitin Menon (India) and Rod Tucker (Australia)
Player of the match: Rohit Sharma (Mumbai Indians)

- Royal Challengers Bangalore won the toss and elected to field.

21 April 2018
20:00 (D/N)
Scorecard

Delhi Daredevils; 174/5 (20 overs)	v	Royal Challengers Bangalore (H); 176/4 (18 overs)
Rishabh Pant 85 (48); Yuzvendra Chahal 2/22 (3 overs)		AB de Villiers 90* (39); Glenn Maxwell 1/13 (2 overs)

Royal Challengers Bangalore won by 6 wickets
M. Chinnaswamy Stadium, Bangalore
Umpires: Chris Gaffaney (New Zealand) and C. K. Nandan (India)
Player of the match: AB de Villiers (Royal Challengers Bangalore)

- Royal Challengers Bangalore won the toss and elected to field.

25 April 2018
20:00 (D/N)
Scorecard

(H) Royal Challengers Bangalore; 205/8 (20 overs)	v	Chennai Super Kings; 207/5 (19.4 overs)
AB de Villiers 68 (30); Dwayne Bravo 2/33 (4 overs)		Ambati Rayudu 82 (53); Yuzvendra Chahal 2/26 (4 overs)

Chennai Super Kings won by 5 wickets
M. Chinnaswamy Stadium, Bangalore
Umpires: Nigel Llong (England) and Virender Sharma (India)
Player of the match: MS Dhoni (Chennai Super Kings)

- Chennai Super Kings won the toss and elected to field.

29 April 2018
20:00 (D/N)
Scorecard

(H) Royal Challengers Bangalore; 175/4 (20 overs)	v	Kolkata Knight Riders; 176/4 (19.1 overs)
Virat Kohli 68* (44); Andre Russell 3/31 (3 overs)		Chris Lynn 62* (52); Murugan Ashwin 2/36 (4 overs)

Kolkata Knight Riders won by 6 wickets
M. Chinnaswamy Stadium, Bangalore
Umpires: Anil Chaudhary (India) and Nigel Llong (England)
Player of the match: Chris Lynn (Kolkata Knight Riders)

- Kolkata Knight Riders won the toss and elected to field.

1 May 2018
20:00 (D/N)
Scorecard

(H) Royal Challengers Bangalore; 167/7 (20 overs)	v	Mumbai Indians; 153/7 (20 overs)
Manan Vohra 45 (31); Hardik Pandya 3/28 (3 overs)		Hardik Pandya 50 (42); Tim Southee 2/25 (4 overs)

Royal Challengers Bangalore won by 14 runs
M. Chinnaswamy Stadium, Bangalore
Umpires: Marais Erasmus (South Africa) and Nitin Menon (India)
Player of the match: Tim Southee (Royal Challengers Bangalore)

- Mumbai Indians won the toss and elected to field.

5 May 2018
16:00 (D/N)
Scorecard

Royal Challengers Bangalore; 127/9 (20 overs)	v	Chennai Super Kings (H); 128/4 (18 overs)
Parthiv Patel 53 (41); Ravindra Jadeja 3/18 (4 overs)		Ambati Rayudu 32 (25); Umesh Yadav 2/15 (3 overs)

Chennai Super Kings won by 6 wickets
Maharashtra Cricket Association Stadium, Pune
Umpires: Yeshwant Barde (India) and Nitin Menon (India)
Player of the match: Ravindra Jadeja (Chennai Super Kings)

- Chennai Super Kings won the toss and elected to field.

7 May 2018
20:00 (D/N)
Scorecard

(H) Sunrisers Hyderabad; 146 (20 overs)	v	Royal Challengers Bangalore; 141/6 (20 overs)
Kane Williamson 56 (39); Mohammed Siraj 3/25 (4 overs)		Virat Kohli 39 (30); Shakib Al Hasan 2/36 (4 overs)

Sunrisers Hyderabad won by 5 runs
Rajiv Gandhi International Cricket Stadium, Hyderabad
Umpires: Bruce Oxenford (Australia) and Virender Sharma (India)
Player of the match: Kane Williamson (Sunrisers Hyderabad)

- Royal Challengers Bangalore won the toss and elected to field.

12 May 2018
20:00 (D/N)
Scorecard

(H) Delhi Daredevils; 181/4 (20 overs)	v	Royal Challengers Bangalore; 187/5 (19 overs)
Rishabh Pant 61 (34); Yuzvendra Chahal 2/28 (4 overs)		AB de Villiers 72* (37); Trent Boult 2/40 (4 overs)

Royal Challengers Bangalore won by 5 wickets
Feroz Shah Kotla, Delhi
Umpires: K. N. Ananthapadmanabhan (India) and Kumar Dharmasena (Sri Lanka)
Player of the match: AB de Villiers (Royal Challengers Bangalore)

- Royal Challengers Bangalore won the toss and elected to field.
- Sandeep Lamichhane and Abhishek Sharma (both Delhi Daredevils) made their T20 debuts.
- Delhi Daredevils were eliminated as a result of this match.

14 May 2018
20:00 (D/N)
Scorecard

(H) Kings XI Punjab; 88 (15.1 overs)	v	Royal Challengers Bangalore; 92/0 (8.1 overs)
Aaron Finch 26 (23); Umesh Yadav 3/23 (4 overs)		Virat Kohli 48* (28); Ravichandran Ashwin 0/9 (1 over)

Royal Challengers Bangalore won by 10 wickets
Holkar Cricket Stadium, Indore
Umpires: Bruce Oxenford (Australia) and Virender Sharma (India)
Player of the match: Umesh Yadav (Royal Challengers Bangalore)

- Royal Challengers Bangalore won the toss and elected to field.
- Chennai Super Kings qualified for the playoffs and Sunrisers Hyderabad advanced to Qualifier 1 as a result of this match.

17 May 2018
20:00 (D/N)
Scorecard

(H) Royal Challengers Bangalore; 218/6 (20 overs)	v	Sunrisers Hyderabad; 204/3 (20 overs)
AB de Villiers 69 (39); Rashid Khan 3/27 (4 overs)		Kane Williamson 81 (42); Moeen Ali 1/21 (2 overs)

Royal Challengers Bangalore won by 14 runs
M. Chinnaswamy Stadium, Bangalore
Umpires: Anil Dandekar (India) and Sundaram Ravi (India)
Player of the match: AB de Villiers (Royal Challengers Bangalore)

- Sunrisers Hyderabad won the toss and elected to field.

19 May 2018
16:00 (D/N)
Scorecard

(H) Rajasthan Royals; 164/5 (20 overs)	v	Royal Challengers Bangalore; 134 (19.2 overs)
Rahul Tripathi 80* (58); Umesh Yadav 3/25 (4 overs)		AB de Villiers 53 (35); Shreyas Gopal 4/16 (4 overs)

Rajasthan Royals won by 30 runs
Sawai Mansingh Stadium, Jaipur
Umpires: Bruce Oxenford (Australia) and Virender Sharma (India)
Player of the match: Shreyas Gopal (Rajasthan Royals)

- Rajasthan Royals won the toss and elected to bat.
- Royal Challengers Bangalore were eliminated as a result of this match.

== Statistics ==
=== Most runs ===
Name	Mat	Runs	HS	Ave	SR
Virat Kohli	14	530	92*	48.18	139.10
AB de Villiers	12	480	90*	53.33	174.54
Mandeep Singh	14	252	47*	25.20	135.48
Quinton de Kock	8	201	53	25.12	124.07
Parthiv Patel	6	153	53	30.60	140.36

- Source: ESPNcricinfo

=== Most wickets ===
Name	Mat	Wkts	BBI	Ave	Eco
Umesh Yadav	14	20	3/23	20.90	7.86
Yuzvendra Chahal	14	12	2/22	30.25	7.26
Mohammed Siraj	11	11	3/25	33.36	8.95
Chris Woakes	5	8	3/36	23.75	10.36
Tim Southee	8	5	3/30	52.20	9.00

- Source: ESPNcricinfo
