= 2018 Chennai Super Kings season =

Indian Premier League cricket team season

Chennai Super Kings
2018 season
- Coach: Stephen Fleming
- Captain: MS Dhoni
- Ground(s): M.A.Chidambaram Stadium, Chennai; MCA Stadium, Pune
- IPL League: Champions
- Most runs: Ambati Rayudu (602)
- Most wickets: Shardul Thakur (16)

Chennai Super Kings (CSK) franchise cricket team based in Chennai, Tamil Nadu, India, plays in the Indian Premier League (IPL). They are one of the eight teams that competed in the 2018 Indian Premier League. It was revealed that Mahendra Singh Dhoni would lead the team for the ninth season in succession, while Michael Hussey is in his first season as the team's batting coach.

Kings retained their former skipper MS Dhoni, Suresh Raina and all rounder Ravindra Jadeja from their IPL 2015 squad for 33 crores before 2018 player auction.

The home matches of the Chennai Super Kings were under threat following the 2018 Cauvery water dispute and about 4000 security personnel were deployed in wake of the homecoming match for CSK against the Kolkata Knight Riders on April 10, 2018, at the M. A. Chidambaram Stadium. However, later BCCI announced that Pune would be the new temporary home ground for CSK for the remainder of the tournament following the ongoing protests in the state which couldn't be controlled by the security officials.

In March 2019, a webseries titled Roar of The Lion (documentary) is set to be released based on CSK's epic success at the 2018 IPL where they managed to clinch the 2018 IPL trophy after serving a 2-year suspension.

== IPL auction 2018 ==
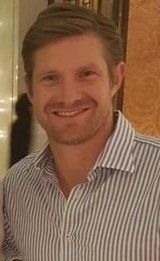
Watson was the highest Overseas Buy for CSK

Chennai Super Kings bought the following players in the 2018 auction:*Kedar Jadhav

- Dwayne Bravo
- Karn Sharma
- Shane Watson
- Shardul Thakur
- Ambati Rayudu
- Murali Vijay
- Harbhajan Singh
- Faf du Plessis
- Mark Wood
- Sam Billings
- Imran Tahir
- Deepak Chahar
- Mitchell Santner
- Lungi Ngidi
- KM Asif
- Narayan Jagadeesan
- Kanishk Seth
- Monu Singh
- Dhruv Shorey
- Kshitiz Sharma
- Chaitanya Bishnoi

== Squad ==
- Players with international caps are listed in **bold**.

No.	Name	Nationality	Birth date	Batting style	Bowling style	Year signed	Salary	Notes
Batsmen
3	**Suresh Raina**	India	27 November 1986 (aged 31)	Left-handed	Right-arm off break	2018	₹11 crore (US$1.3 million)	
9	**Ambati Rayudu**	India	23 September 1985 (aged 32)	Right-handed	Right-arm off break	2018	₹2.2 crore (US$260,000)	
13	**Faf du Plessis**	South Africa	13 July 1984 (aged 33)	Right-handed	Right-arm leg break	2018	₹1.6 crore (US$189,000)	Overseas
66	Dhruv Shorey	India	5 June 1992 (aged 25)	Right-handed	Right-arm off break	2018	₹20 lakh (US$24,000)	
81	**Kedar Jadhav**	India	26 March 1985 (aged 33)	Right-handed	Right-arm off break	2018	₹7.8 crore (US$922,593.40)	
1	**Murali Vijay**	India	1 April 1984 (aged 34)	Right-handed	Right-arm off break	2018	₹2 crore (US$237,000)	
All-rounders
5	Kshitiz Sharma	India	21 April 1990 (aged 27)	Right-handed	Right-arm medium	2018	₹20 lakh (US$24,000)	
8	**Ravindra Jadeja**	India	6 December 1988 (aged 29)	Left-handed	Slow left-arm orthodox	2018	₹7 crore (US$827,968.40)	
33	**Shane Watson**	Australia	17 June 1981 (aged 36)	Right-handed	Right-arm fast medium	2018	₹4 crore (US$473,000)	Overseas
36	**Karn Sharma**	India	23 October 1987 (aged 30)	Left-handed	Right-arm leg break	2018	₹5 crore (US$591,000)	
47	**Dwayne Bravo**	Trinidad and Tobago	7 October 1983 (aged 34)	Right-handed	Right-arm medium fast	2018	₹6.4 crore (US$757,000)	Overseas
72	**David Willey**	England	28 February 1990 (aged 28)	Left-handed	Left-arm fast	2018	₹2 crore (US$237,000)	Overseas
Wicket-keepers
7	**MS Dhoni**	India	7 July 1981 (aged 36)	Right-handed	Right-arm medium	2018	₹15 crore (US$1.8 million)	Captain
18	Narayan Jagadeesan	India	24 December 1995 (aged 22)	Right-handed		2018	₹20 lakh (US$24,000)	
77	**Sam Billings**	England	15 June 1991 (aged 26)	Right-handed		2018	₹1 crore (US$118,000)	Overseas
Bowlers
10	Chaitanya Bishnoi	India	25 August 1994 (aged 23)	Left-handed	Slow left-arm orthodox	2018	₹20 lakh (US$24,000)	
11	**Mark Wood**	England	11 January 1990 (aged 28)	Right-handed	Right-arm fast	2018	₹1.5 crore (US$177,000)	Overseas
22	**Lungi Ngidi**	South Africa	29 March 1996 (aged 22)	Right-handed	Right-arm fast	2018	₹50 lakh (US$59,000)	Overseas
23	Monu Kumar	India	5 November 1994 (aged 23)	Right-handed	Right-arm medium	2018	₹20 lakh (US$24,000)	
24	KM Asif	India	24 July 1993 (aged 24)	Right-handed	Right-arm fast medium	2018	₹40 lakh (US$47,000)	
27	**Harbhajan Singh**	India	3 July 1980 (aged 37)	Right-handed	Right-arm off break	2018	₹2 crore (US$237,000)	
34	Kanishk Seth	India	4 November 1997 (aged 20)	Right-handed	Left-arm medium	2018	₹20 lakh (US$24,000)	
54	**Shardul Thakur**	India	16 October 1991 (aged 26)	Right-handed	Right-arm medium fast	2018	₹2.6 crore (US$308,000)	
74	**Mitchell Santner**	New Zealand	5 February 1992 (aged 26)	Left-handed	Slow left-arm orthodox	2018	₹50 lakh (US$59,000)	Overseas
90	Deepak Chahar	India	7 August 1992 (aged 25)	Right-handed	Right-arm medium fast	2018	₹80 lakh (US$95,000)	
99	**Imran Tahir**	South Africa	27 March 1979 (aged 39)	Right-handed	Right-arm leg break	2018	₹1 crore (US$118,000)	Overseas

== Administration and support staff ==
- Owner – N. Srinivasan (India Cements)
- Head coach – Stephen Fleming
- Batting coach - Michael Hussey
- Bowling coach – Lakshmipathy Balaji
- Bowling consultant – Eric Simons
- Fielding coach – Rajiv Kumar
- Physical trainer – Gregory King
- Physio – Tommy Simsek
- Team Doctor – Dr.Madhu
- Team manager – Russell Radhakrishnan

== Season overview ==
=== Standings ===
Pos	Team	Pld	W	L	NR	Pts	NRR	
1	Sunrisers Hyderabad (RU)	14	9	5	0	18	0.284	Advanced to Qualifier 1
2	Chennai Super Kings (C)	14	9	5	0	18	0.253	Advanced to Qualifier 1
3	Kolkata Knight Riders (3)	14	8	6	0	16	−0.070	Advanced to the Eliminator
4	Rajasthan Royals (4)	14	7	7	0	14	−0.250	Advanced to the Eliminator
5	Mumbai Indians	14	6	8	0	12	0.317	
6	Royal Challengers Bangalore	14	6	8	0	12	0.129	
7	Kings XI Punjab	14	6	8	0	12	−0.502	
8	Delhi Daredevils	14	5	9	0	10	−0.222	

Source: ESPNcricinfo
The four top ranked teams qualify for the playoffs.

=== Results by match ===
Match	1	2	3	4	5	6	7	8	9	10	11	12	13	14
Ground	A	H	A	H	A	A	H	H	A	H	A	H	A	H
Result	W	W	L	W	W	W	L	W	L	W	L	W	L	W
Position	1	1	3	1	1	1	1	1	2	1	2	2	2	2

Updated to match(es) played on 20 May 2018. Source: Fixtures
A = Away; H = Home; W = Win; D = Draw; L = Loss

== Fixtures ==
=== League stage ===
7 April
20:00 (D/N)
Scorecard

(H) Mumbai Indians; 165/4 (20 overs)	v	Chennai Super Kings; 169/9 (19.5 overs)
Suryakumar Yadav 43 (29); Shane Watson 2/29 (4 overs)		Dwayne Bravo 68 (30); Mayank Markande 3/23 (4 overs)

Chennai Super Kings won by 1 wicket
Wankhede Stadium, Mumbai
Umpires: Chris Gaffaney (New Zealand) and Nand Kishore (India)
Player of the match: Dwayne Bravo (Chennai Super Kings)

- Chennai Super Kings won the toss and elected to field.

10 April
20:00 (D/N)
Scorecard

Kolkata Knight Riders; 202/6 (20 overs)	v	Chennai Super Kings (H); 205/5 (19.5 overs)
Andre Russell 88* (36); Shane Watson 2/39 (4 overs)		Sam Billings 56 (23); Tom Curran 2/39 (3 overs)

Chennai Super Kings won by 5 wickets
M. A. Chidambaram Stadium, Chennai
Umpires: Anil Chaudhary (India) and Chris Gaffaney (New Zealand)
Player of the match: Sam Billings (Chennai Super Kings)

- Chennai Super Kings won the toss and elected to field.

15 April
20:00 (D/N)
Scorecard

(H) Kings XI Punjab; 197/7 (20 overs)	v	Chennai Super Kings; 193/5 (20 overs)
Chris Gayle 63 (33); Shardul Thakur 2/33 (3 overs)		MS Dhoni 79* (44); Andrew Tye 2/47 (4 overs)

Kings XI Punjab won by 4 runs
Punjab Cricket Association Stadium, Mohali
Umpires: Vineet Kulkarni (India) and C. K. Nandan (India)
Player of the match: Chris Gayle (Kings XI Punjab)

- Chennai Super Kings won the toss and elected to field.

20 April
20:00 (D/N)
Scorecard

(H) Chennai Super Kings; 204/5 (20 overs)	v	Rajasthan Royals; 140 (18.3 overs)
Shane Watson 106 (57); Shreyas Gopal 3/20 (4 overs)		Ben Stokes 45 (37); Karn Sharma 2/13 (1.3 overs)

Chennai Super Kings won by 64 runs
Maharashtra Cricket Association Stadium, Pune
Umpires: K. N. Ananthapadmanabhan (India) and Nitin Menon (India)
Player of the match: Shane Watson (Chennai Super Kings)

- Rajasthan Royals won the toss and elected to field.

22 April
16:00 (D/N)
Scorecard

Chennai Super Kings; 182/3 (20 overs)	v	Sunrisers Hyderabad (H); 178/6 (20 overs)
Ambati Rayudu 79 (37); Bhuvneshwar Kumar 1/22 (3 overs)		Kane Williamson 84 (51); Deepak Chahar 3/15 (4 overs)

Chennai Super Kings won by 4 runs
Rajiv Gandhi International Cricket Stadium, Hyderabad
Umpires: Anil Chaudhary (India) and Vineet Kulkarni (India)
Player of the match: Ambati Rayudu (Chennai Super Kings)

- Sunrisers Hyderabad won the toss and elected to field.

25 April
20:00 (D/N)
Scorecard

(H) Royal Challengers Bangalore; 205/8 (20 overs)	v	Chennai Super Kings; 207/5 (19.4 overs)
AB de Villiers 68 (30); Dwayne Bravo 2/33 (4 overs)		Ambati Rayudu 82 (53); Yuzvendra Chahal 2/26 (4 overs)

Chennai Super Kings won by 5 wickets
M. Chinnaswamy Stadium, Bangalore
Umpires: Nigel Llong (England) and Virender Sharma (India)
Player of the match: MS Dhoni (Chennai Super Kings)

- Chennai Super Kings won the toss and elected to field.

28 April
20:00 (D/N)
Scorecard

(H) Chennai Super Kings; 169/5 (20 overs)	v	Mumbai Indians; 170/2 (19.4 overs)
Suresh Raina 75* (47); Mitchell McClenaghan 2/26 (4 overs)		Rohit Sharma 56* (33); Harbhajan Singh 1/20 (3.5 overs)

Mumbai Indians won by 8 wickets
Maharashtra Cricket Association Stadium, Pune
Umpires: Chris Gaffaney (New Zealand) and Nitin Menon (India)
Player of the match: Rohit Sharma (Mumbai Indians)

- Mumbai Indians won the toss and elected to field.

30 April
20:00 (D/N)
Scorecard

(H) Chennai Super Kings; 211/4 (20 overs)	v	Delhi Daredevils; 198/5 (20 overs)
Shane Watson 78 (40); Glenn Maxwell 1/5 (1 over)		Rishabh Pant 79 (45); K. M. Asif 2/43 (3 overs)

Chennai Super Kings won by 13 runs
Maharashtra Cricket Association Stadium, Pune
Umpires: Anil Dandekar (India) and Chettithody Shamshuddin (India)
Player of the match: Shane Watson (Chennai Super Kings)

- Delhi Daredevils won the toss and elected to field.
- Chennai Super Kings recorded their 100th T20 victory.

3 May
20:00 (D/N)
Scorecard

Chennai Super Kings; 177/5 (20 overs)	v	Kolkata Knight Riders (H); 180/4 (17.4 overs)
MS Dhoni 43* (25); Sunil Narine 2/20 (4 overs)		Shubman Gill 57* (36); Harbhajan Singh 1/20 (3 overs)

Kolkata Knight Riders won by 6 wickets
Eden Gardens, Kolkata
Umpires: Abhijit Deshmukh (India) and Kumar Dharmasena (Sri Lanka)
Player of the match: Sunil Narine (Kolkata Knight Riders)

- Kolkata Knight Riders won the toss and elected to field.

5 May
16:00 (D/N)
Scorecard

Royal Challengers Bangalore; 127/9 (20 overs)	v	Chennai Super Kings (H); 128/4 (18 overs)
Parthiv Patel 53 (41); Ravindra Jadeja 3/18 (4 overs)		Ambati Rayudu 32 (25); Umesh Yadav 2/15 (3 overs)

Chennai Super Kings won by 6 wickets
Maharashtra Cricket Association Stadium, Pune
Umpires: Yeshwant Barde (India) and Nitin Menon (India)
Player of the match: Ravindra Jadeja (Chennai Super Kings)

- Chennai Super Kings won the toss and elected to field.

11 May
20:00 (D/N)
Scorecard

Chennai Super Kings; 176/4 (20 overs)	v	Rajasthan Royals (H); 177/6 (19.5 overs)
Suresh Raina 52 (35); Jofra Archer 2/42 (4 overs)		Jos Buttler 95* (60); Shardul Thakur 1/22 (4 overs)

Rajasthan Royals won by 4 wickets
Sawai Mansingh Stadium, Jaipur
Umpires: Yeshwant Barde (India) and Marais Erasmus (South Africa)
Player of the match: Jos Buttler (Rajasthan Royals)

- Chennai Super Kings won the toss and elected to bat.

13 May
16:00 (D/N)
Scorecard

Sunrisers Hyderabad; 179/4 (20 overs)	v	Chennai Super Kings (H); 180/2 (19 overs)
Shikhar Dhawan 79 (49); Shardul Thakur 2/32 (4 overs)		Ambati Rayudu 100* (62); Sandeep Sharma 1/36 (4 overs)

Chennai Super Kings won by 8 wickets
Maharashtra Cricket Association Stadium, Pune
Umpires: Yeshwant Barde (India) and Marais Erasmus (South Africa)
Player of the match: Ambati Rayudu (Chennai Super Kings)

- Chennai Super Kings won the toss and elected to field.

18 May
20:00 (D/N)
Scorecard

(H) Delhi Daredevils; 162/5 (20 overs)	v	Chennai Super Kings; 128/6 (20 overs)
Rishabh Pant 38 (26); Lungi Ngidi 2/14 (3 overs)		Ambati Rayudu 50 (29); Trent Boult 2/20 (4 overs)

Delhi Daredevils won by 34 runs
Feroz Shah Kotla, Delhi
Umpires: Kumar Dharmasena (Sri Lanka) and Vineet Kulkarni (India)
Player of the match: Harshal Patel (Delhi Daredevils)

- Chennai Super Kings won the toss and elected to field.

20 May
20:00 (D/N)
Scorecard

Kings XI Punjab; 153 (19.4 overs)	v	Chennai Super Kings (H); 159/5 (19.1 overs)
Karun Nair 54 (26); Lungi Ngidi 4/10 (4 overs)		Suresh Raina 61* (48); Ankit Rajpoot 2/19 (4 overs)

Chennai Super Kings won by 5 wickets
Maharashtra Cricket Association Stadium, Pune
Umpires: Yeshwant Barde (India) and Nitin Menon (India)
Player of the match: Lungi Ngidi (Chennai Super Kings)

- Chennai Super Kings won the toss and elected to field.
- Rajasthan Royals qualified for the playoffs, Kings XI Punjab were eliminated and Chennai Super Kings advanced to Qualifier 1 as a result of this match.

=== Playoff stage ===
==== Qualifier 1 ====
22 May
19:00 (D/N)
Scorecard

Sunrisers Hyderabad; 139/7 (20 overs)	v	Chennai Super Kings; 140/8 (19.1 overs)
Carlos Brathwaite 43* (29); Dwayne Bravo 2/25 (4 overs)		Faf du Plessis 67* (42); Rashid Khan 2/11 (4 overs)

Chennai Super Kings won by 2 wickets
Wankhede Stadium, Mumbai
Umpires: Marais Erasmus (South Africa) and Chettithody Shamshuddin (India)
Player of the match: Faf du Plessis (Chennai Super Kings)

- Chennai Super Kings won the toss and elected to field.

==== Final ====
27 May
19:00 (D/N)
Scorecard

Sunrisers Hyderabad; 178/6 (20 overs)	v	Chennai Super Kings; 181/2 (18.3 overs)
Kane Williamson 47 (36); Ravindra Jadeja 1/24 (2 overs)		Shane Watson 117* (57); Carlos Brathwaite 1/27 (2.3 overs)

Chennai Super Kings won by 8 wickets
Wankhede Stadium, Mumbai
Umpires: Marais Erasmus (South Africa) and Sundaram Ravi (India)
Player of the match: Shane Watson (Chennai Super Kings)

- Chennai Super Kings won the toss and elected to field.

== Statistics ==
=== Most runs ===
Name	Mat	Inn	Runs	HS	Ave	SR
Ambati Rayudu	16	16	602	100*	43.00	149.75
Shane Watson	15	15	555	117*	39.64	154.59
MS Dhoni	16	15	455	79*	75.83	150.66
Suresh Raina	15	15	445	75*	37.08	132.44
Faf du Plessis	6	6	162	67*	32.40	125.58

- Source: ESPNcricinfo

=== Most wickets ===
Name	Mat	Inn	Wkts	BBI	Ave	Eco
Shardul Thakur	13	13	16	2/18	26.93	9.23
Dwayne Bravo	16	16	14	2/16	38.07	9.96
Lungi Ngidi	7	7	11	4/10	14.18	6.00
Ravindra Jadeja	16	14	11	3/18	27.54	7.39
Deepak Chahar	12	12	10	3/15	27.80	7.28

- Source: ESPNcricinfo
