= 2018 Mumbai Indians season =

Indian Premier League cricket team season

Mumbai Indians
2018 season
- Coach: Mahela Jayawardene
- Captain: Rohit Sharma
- Ground(s): Wankhede Stadium, Mumbai
- IPL: 5th
- Most runs: Suryakumar Yadav (512)
- Most wickets: Hardik Pandya (18)

The 2018 season was the 11th season for the Indian Premier League franchise Mumbai Indians.

== Offseason ==
=== Support staff changes ===
- In December 2017, Jonty Rhodes stepped down as the fielding coach in order to focus on personal business.
- In December 2017, James Pamment was appointed fielding coach.
- In February 2018, Lasith Malinga was named as the bowling mentor of the team.

=== Others ===
In March 2018, the franchise signed up Goibibo as the principal sponsor of the team for the season. As part of the deal, Goibibo was sported on the back of the team jersey. Later that month, the franchise onboarded Samsung as the lead sponsor of the team, replacing Videocon. The three-year contract with Samsung was worth approximately ₹25 crore per year, according to a report in the Economic Times.

== Squad ==
- Players with international caps are listed in **bold**.

No.	Name	Nationality	Birth date	Batting style	Bowling style	Year signed	Salary	Notes
Batsmen
17	**Evin Lewis**	Trinidad and Tobago	27 December 1991 (aged 26)	Left-handed	Right-arm medium	2018	₹3.8 crore (US$395,000)	Overseas
21	**JP Duminy**	South Africa	14 April 1984 (aged 33)	Left-handed	Right-arm off break	2018	₹1 crore (US$104,000)	Vice-Captain; Overseas
23	Siddhesh Lad	India	23 May 1992 (aged 25)	Right-handed	Right-arm off break	2018	₹20 lakh (US$21,000)	
45	**Rohit Sharma**	India	30 April 1987 (aged 30)	Right-handed	Right-arm off break	2018	₹15 crore (US$1.6 million)	Captain
77	Suryakumar Yadav	India	14 September 1990 (aged 27)	Right-handed	Right-arm medium	2018	₹3.2 crore (US$332,000)	
—N/a	**Saurabh Tiwary**	India	30 December 1989 (aged 28)	Left-handed	Right-arm off break	2018	₹80 lakh (US$83,000)	
—N/a	Sharad Lumba	India	10 September 1989 (aged 28)	Right-handed	Right-arm off break	2018	₹20 lakh (US$21,000)	
All-rounders
24	Krunal Pandya	India	24 March 1991 (aged 27)	Left-handed	Slow left-arm orthodox	2018	₹8.8 crore (US$913,814.00)	
31	**Ben Cutting**	Australia	30 January 1987 (aged 31)	Right-handed	Right-arm medium	2018	₹2.2 crore (US$228,000)	Overseas
33	**Hardik Pandya**	India	11 October 1993 (aged 24)	Right-handed	Right-arm medium-fast	2018	₹11 crore (US$1.1 million)	
55	**Kieron Pollard**	Trinidad and Tobago	12 May 1987 (aged 30)	Right-handed	Right-arm medium-fast	2018	₹5.4 crore (US$561,000)	Overseas
—N/a	Anukul Roy	India	30 November 1998 (aged 19)	Left-handed	Slow left-arm orthodox	2018	₹20 lakh (US$21,000)	
—N/a	Tajinder Dhillon	India	25 May 1992 (aged 25)	Right-handed	Right-arm off break	2018	₹55 lakh (US$57,000)	
Wicket-keepers
27	Aditya Tare	India	7 November 1987 (aged 30)	Right-handed		2018	₹20 lakh (US$21,000)	
51	Ishan Kishan	India	18 July 1998 (aged 19)	Left-handed	Left-arm medium	2018	₹6.2 crore (US$644,000)	
Bowlers
4	**Akila Dananjaya**	Sri Lanka	4 October 1993 (aged 24)	Left-handed	Right-arm off break	2018	₹50 lakh (US$52,000)	Overseas
11	Mayank Markande	India	11 November 1997 (aged 20)	Right-handed	Right-arm leg break	2018	₹20 lakh (US$21,000)	
18	Pradeep Sangwan	India	5 November 1990 (aged 27)	Right-handed	Left-arm fast-medium	2018	₹1.5 crore (US$156,000)	
81	**Mitchell McClenaghan**	New Zealand	11 June 1986 (aged 31)	Left-handed	Left-arm fast-medium	2018	₹1 crore (US$104,000)	Overseas
90	**Mustafizur Rahman**	Bangladesh	6 September 1995 (aged 22)	Left-handed	Left-arm fast-medium	2018	₹2.2 crore (US$228,000)	Overseas
93	**Jasprit Bumrah**	India	6 December 1993 (aged 24)	Right-handed	Right-arm fast-medium	2018	₹7 crore (US$726,897.50)	
—N/a	Rahul Chahar	India	4 August 1999 (aged 18)	Right-handed	Right-arm leg spin	2018	₹1.9 crore (US$197,000)	
—N/a	**Pat Cummins**	Australia	8 May 1993 (aged 24)	Right-handed	Right-arm fast	2018	₹5.4 crore (US$561,000)	Overseas
—N/a	Mohsin Khan	India	15 July 1998 (aged 19)	Left-handed	Left-arm medium-fast	2018	₹20 lakh (US$21,000)	
—N/a	M. D. Nidheesh	India	5 May 1991 (aged 26)	Right-handed	Right-arm fast-medium	2018	₹20 lakh (US$21,000)	
—N/a	**Jason Behrendorff**	Australia	20 April 1990 (aged 27)	Right-handed	Left-arm fast-medium	2018	₹1.5 crore (US$156,000)	Overseas
—N/a	**Adam Milne**	New Zealand	13 April 1992 (aged 25)	Right-handed	Right-arm fast-medium	2018	₹75 lakh (US$78,000)	Overseas

== Season ==
=== League table ===
Pos	Team	Pld	W	L	NR	Pts	NRR	
1	Sunrisers Hyderabad (RU)	14	9	5	0	18	0.284	Advanced to Qualifier 1
2	Chennai Super Kings (C)	14	9	5	0	18	0.253	Advanced to Qualifier 1
3	Kolkata Knight Riders (3)	14	8	6	0	16	−0.070	Advanced to the Eliminator
4	Rajasthan Royals (4)	14	7	7	0	14	−0.250	Advanced to the Eliminator
5	Mumbai Indians	14	6	8	0	12	0.317	
6	Royal Challengers Bangalore	14	6	8	0	12	0.129	
7	Kings XI Punjab	14	6	8	0	12	−0.502	
8	Delhi Daredevils	14	5	9	0	10	−0.222	

Source: ESPNcricinfo
The four top ranked teams qualify for the playoffs.

=== Results ===
==== League matches ====
7 April 2018
20:00 (D/N)
Scorecard

(H) Mumbai Indians; 165/4 (20 overs)	v	Chennai Super Kings; 169/9 (19.5 overs)
Suryakumar Yadav 43 (29); Shane Watson 2/29 (4 overs)		Dwayne Bravo 68 (30); Mayank Markande 3/23 (4 overs)

Chennai Super Kings won by 1 wicket
Wankhede Stadium, Mumbai
Umpires: Chris Gaffaney (New Zealand) and Nand Kishore (India)
Player of the match: Dwayne Bravo (Chennai Super Kings)

- Chennai Super Kings won the toss and elected to field.

12 April 2018
20:00 (D/N)
Scorecard

Mumbai Indians; 147/8 (20 overs)	v	Sunrisers Hyderabad (H); 151/9 (20 overs)
Evin Lewis 29 (17); Sandeep Sharma 2/25 (4 overs)		Shikhar Dhawan 45 (28); Mayank Markande 4/23 (4 overs)

Sunrisers Hyderabad won by 1 wicket
Rajiv Gandhi International Cricket Stadium, Hyderabad
Umpires: Nigel Llong (England) and C. K. Nandan (India)
Player of the match: Rashid Khan (Sunrisers Hyderabad)

- Sunrisers Hyderabad won the toss and elected to field.

14 April 2018
16:00 (D/N)
Scorecard

(H) Mumbai Indians; 194/7 (20 overs)	v	Delhi Daredevils; 195/3 (20 overs)
Suryakumar Yadav 53 (32); Daniel Christian 3/35 (3 overs)		Jason Roy 91* (53); Krunal Pandya 2/21 (3 overs)

Delhi Daredevils won by 7 wickets
Wankhede Stadium, Mumbai
Umpires: K. N. Ananthapadmanabhan (India) and Nitin Menon (India)
Player of the match: Jason Roy (Delhi Daredevils)

- Delhi Daredevils won the toss and elected to field.

17 April 2018
20:00 (D/N)
Scorecard

(H) Mumbai Indians; 213/6 (20 overs)	v	Royal Challengers Bangalore; 167/8 (20 overs)
Rohit Sharma 94 (52); Umesh Yadav 2/36 (4 overs)		Virat Kohli 92* (62); Krunal Pandya 3/28 (4 overs)

Mumbai Indians won by 46 runs
Wankhede Stadium, Mumbai
Umpires: Nitin Menon (India) and Rod Tucker (Australia)
Player of the match: Rohit Sharma (Mumbai Indians)

- Royal Challengers Bangalore won the toss and elected to field.

22 April 2018
20:00 (D/N)
Scorecard

Mumbai Indians; 167/7 (20 overs)	v	Rajasthan Royals (H); 168/7 (19.4 overs)
Suryakumar Yadav 72 (47); Jofra Archer 3/23 (4 overs)		Sanju Samson 52 (39); Hardik Pandya 2/25 (2.4 overs)

Rajasthan Royals won by 3 wickets
Sawai Mansingh Stadium, Jaipur
Umpires: K. N. Ananthapadmanabhan (India) and Rod Tucker (Australia)
Player of the match: Jofra Archer (Rajasthan Royals)

- Mumbai Indians won the toss and elected to bat.

24 April 2018
20:00 (D/N)
Scorecard

Sunrisers Hyderabad; 118 (18.4 overs)	v	Mumbai Indians (H); 87 (18.5 overs)
Kane Williamson 29 (21); Mayank Markande 2/15 (3 overs)		Suryakumar Yadav 34 (38); Siddarth Kaul 3/23 (4 overs)

Sunrisers Hyderabad won by 31 runs
Wankhede Stadium, Mumbai
Umpires: Sundaram Ravi (India) and Chettithody Shamshuddin (India)
Player of the match: Rashid Khan (Sunrisers Hyderabad)

- Mumbai Indians won the toss and elected to field.

28 April 2018
20:00 (D/N)
Scorecard

(H) Chennai Super Kings; 169/5 (20 overs)	v	Mumbai Indians; 170/2 (19.4 overs)
Suresh Raina 75* (47); Mitchell McClenaghan 2/26 (4 overs)		Rohit Sharma 56* (33); Harbhajan Singh 1/20 (3.5 overs)

Mumbai Indians won by 8 wickets
Maharashtra Cricket Association Stadium, Pune
Umpires: Chris Gaffaney (New Zealand) and Nitin Menon (India)
Player of the match: Rohit Sharma (Mumbai Indians)

- Mumbai Indians won the toss and elected to field.

1 May 2018
20:00 (D/N)
Scorecard

(H) Royal Challengers Bangalore; 167/7 (20 overs)	v	Mumbai Indians; 153/7 (20 overs)
Manan Vohra 45 (31); Hardik Pandya 3/28 (3 overs)		Hardik Pandya 50 (42); Tim Southee 2/25 (4 overs)

Royal Challengers Bangalore won by 14 runs
M. Chinnaswamy Stadium, Bangalore
Umpires: Marais Erasmus (South Africa) and Nitin Menon (India)
Player of the match: Tim Southee (Royal Challengers Bangalore)

- Mumbai Indians won the toss and elected to field.

4 May 2018
20:00 (D/N)
Scorecard

(H) Kings XI Punjab; 174/6 (20 overs)	v	Mumbai Indians; 176/4 (19 overs)
Chris Gayle 50 (40); Jasprit Bumrah 1/19 (4 overs)		Suryakumar Yadav 57 (42); Mujeeb Ur Rahman 2/37 (4 overs)

Mumbai Indians won by 6 wickets
Holkar Cricket Stadium, Indore
Umpires: Anil Dandekar (India) and Sundaram Ravi (India)
Player of the match: Suryakumar Yadav (Mumbai Indians)

- Mumbai Indians won the toss and elected to field.

6 May 2018
16:00 (D/N)
Scorecard

(H) Mumbai Indians; 181/4 (20 overs)	v	Kolkata Knight Riders; 168/6 (20 overs)
Suryakumar Yadav 59 (39); Andre Russell 2/12 (2 overs)		Robin Uthappa 54 (35); Hardik Pandya 2/19 (4 overs)

Mumbai Indians won by 13 runs
Wankhede Stadium, Mumbai
Umpires: Abhijit Deshmukh (India) and Kumar Dharmasena (Sri Lanka)
Player of the match: Hardik Pandya (Mumbai Indians)

- Kolkata Knight Riders won the toss and elected to field.

9 May 2018
20:00 (D/N)
Scorecard

Mumbai Indians; 210/6 (20 overs)	v	Kolkata Knight Riders (H); 108 (18.1 overs)
Ishan Kishan 62 (21); Piyush Chawla 3/48 (4 overs)		Chris Lynn 21 (15); Krunal Pandya 2/12 (3.1 overs)

Mumbai Indians won by 102 runs
Eden Gardens, Kolkata
Umpires: K. N. Ananthapadmanabhan (India) and Anil Chaudhary (India)
Player of the match: Ishan Kishan (Mumbai Indians)

- Kolkata Knight Riders won the toss and elected to field.

13 May 2018
20:00 (D/N)
Scorecard

(H) Mumbai Indians; 168/6 (20 overs)	v	Rajasthan Royals; 171/3 (18 overs)
Evin Lewis 60 (42); Jofra Archer 2/16 (4 overs)		Jos Buttler 94* (53); Hardik Pandya 2/52 (4 overs)

Rajasthan Royals won by 7 wickets
Wankhede Stadium, Mumbai
Umpires: Nitin Menon (India) and Sundaram Ravi (India)
Player of the match: Jos Buttler (Rajasthan Royals)

- Rajasthan Royals won the toss and elected to field.

16 May 2018
20:00 (D/N)
Scorecard

(H) Mumbai Indians; 186/8 (20 overs)	v	Kings XI Punjab; 183/5 (20 overs)
Kieron Pollard 50 (23); Andrew Tye 4/16 (4 overs)		K. L. Rahul 94 (60); Jasprit Bumrah 3/15 (4 overs)

Mumbai Indians won by 3 runs
Wankhede Stadium, Mumbai
Umpires: Marais Erasmus (South Africa) and Nitin Menon (India)
Player of the match: Jasprit Bumrah (Mumbai Indians)

- Kings XI Punjab won the toss and elected to field.

20 May 2018
16:00 (D/N)
Scorecard

(H) Delhi Daredevils; 174/4 (20 overs)	v	Mumbai Indians; 163 (19.3 overs)
Rishabh Pant 64 (44); Krunal Pandya 1/11 (2 overs)		Evin Lewis 48 (31); Amit Mishra 3/19 (4 overs)

Delhi Daredevils won by 11 runs
Feroz Shah Kotla, Delhi
Umpires: Kumar Dharmasena (Sri Lanka) and C. K. Nandan (India)
Player of the match: Amit Mishra (Delhi Daredevils)

- Delhi Daredevils won the toss and elected to bat.
- Mumbai Indians were eliminated as a result of this match.
