= 2017–18 Deodhar Trophy =

- Dates: 4 March 2018 – 8 March 2018
- Administrator: BCCI
- Cricket format: List A cricket
- Tournament format(s): Double round robin and Knockout
- Host: Himachal Pradesh Cricket Association Stadium
- Champions: India B (1st title)
- Participants: 3
- Matches: 4
- Most runs: Ravikumar Samarth (309)
- Most wickets: Shreyas Gopal (7)

The 2017–18 Deodhar Trophy was the 45th edition of the Deodhar Trophy, a List A cricket competition in India. It was contested between Karnataka, the winner of the 2017–18 Vijay Hazare Trophy and two other teams selected by the Board of Control for Cricket in India (BCCI). It was played from 4 to 8 March 2018. India B defeated Karnataka in the final by 6 wickets to win the trophy.

== Squads ==
India A	India B	Karnataka
Ankit Bawne (c); Ricky Bhui; Unmukt Chand; Shubman Gill; Amandeep Khare; Kulwant Khejroliya; Ishan Kishan (wk); Krunal Pandya; Rohit Rayudu; Navdeep Saini; Mohammed Shami; Prithvi Shaw; Basil Thampi; Suryakumar Yadav; Shahbaz Nadeem; ~~Ravichandran Ashwin~~	Shreyas Iyer (c); Khaleel Ahmed; KS Bharat (wk); Abhimanyu Easwaran; Ruturaj Gaikwad; Dharmendrasinh Jadeja; Siddarth Kaul; Siddhesh Lad; Rajat Patidar; Harshal Patel; Manoj Tiwary; Hanuma Vihari; Jayant Yadav; Umesh Yadav; Akshdeep Nath	Karun Nair (c); Mayank Agarwal; Stuart Binny; Pavan Deshpande; C. M. Gautam (wk); Shreyas Gopal; Krishnappa Gowtham; Abhimanyu Mithun; Ronit More; T Pradeep; Prasidh Krishna; Abhishek Reddy; Ravikumar Samarth; BR Sharath (wk); Jagadeesha Suchith

Ravichandran Ashwin was ruled out ahead of the series due to injury. He was replaced by Shahbaz Nadeem. Ankit Bawne was appointed as captain of the India A squad. Bawne was originally in the India B squad; Akshdeep Nath was moved to the India B squad from the India A squad to facilitate the change.

== Group stage ==
=== Points table ===
Team	Pld	W	L	Tie	N/R	Pts	NRR
Karnataka	2	2	0	0	0	8	+0.710
India B	2	1	1	0	0	4	+1.049
India A	2	0	2	0	0	0	–1.927

=== Matches ===
4 March 2018
13:30 (D/N)
Scorecard

India A 178 (41.2 overs)	v	India B 175/2 (26.2 overs)
Ricky Bhui 78 (107); Dharmendrasinh Jadeja 4/36 (9 overs)		Hanuma Vihari 95* (76); Krunal Pandya 1/21 (6 overs)

India B won by 8 wickets (VJD method)
Himachal Pradesh Cricket Association Stadium, Dharamshala
Umpires: C. K. Nandan and Anil Chaudhary

- India B won the toss and elected to field.
- Rain interrupted the match after 14 overs of India A's innings, reducing the match to 43 overs a side.
- India B were set a revised target of 175 runs from 43 overs.

5 March 2018
13:30 (D/N)
Scorecard

Karnataka; 296/8 (50 overs)	v	India B 290/9 (50 overs)
Ravikumar Samarth 117 (115); Siddarth Kaul 3/49 (9 overs)		Manoj Tiwary 120 (110); Shreyas Gopal 3/29 (6 overs)

Karnataka won by 6 runs
Himachal Pradesh Cricket Association Stadium, Dharamshala
Umpires: Anil Chaudhary and Yeshwant Barde

- Karnataka won the toss and elected to bat.

6 March 2018
13:30 (D/N)
Scorecard

Karnataka; 339/4 (50 overs)	v	India A 274 (39.5 Overs)
Pavan Deshpande 95 (87); Mohammed Shami 2/96 (10 overs)		Unmukt Chand 81 (70); Krishnappa Gowtham 4/52 (10 overs)

Karnataka won by 65 runs
Himachal Pradesh Cricket Association Stadium, Dharamshala
Umpires: C. K. Nandan and Yeshwant Barde

- Karnataka won the toss and elected to bat.

== Final ==
Final
8 March 2018
13:30 (D/N)
Scorecard

Karnataka; 279/8 (50 overs)	v	India B 281/4 (48.2 overs)
Ravikumar Samarth 107 (120); Khaleel Ahmed 3/49 (10 overs)		Abhimanyu Easwaran 69 (82); Shreyas Gopal 2/55 (10 overs)

India B won by 6 wickets
Himachal Pradesh Cricket Association Stadium, Dharamshala
Umpires: C. K. Nandan and Anil Chaudhary
Player of the match: Ravikumar Samarth (Karnataka)

- Karnataka won the toss and elected to bat.
