= 2018 Kolkata Knight Riders season =

Indian Premier League cricket team season

Kolkata Knight Riders
2018 season
- Coach: Jacques Kallis
- Captain: Dinesh Karthik
- Ground(s): Eden Gardens
- IPL: 3rd
- Most runs: Dinesh Karthik (498)
- Most wickets: Kuldeep Yadav (17); Sunil Narine (17)

The 2018 season was the 11th season for the Indian Premier League franchise Kolkata Knight Riders (KKR). Dinesh Karthik captained the team for the season. The KKR finished the season in the third place.

== Squad ==
- Players with international caps are listed in **bold**.

No.	Name	Nationality	Birth date	Batting style	Bowling style	Year signed	Salary	Notes
Batsmen
3	Rinku Singh	India	12 October 1997 (aged 20)	Left-handed	Right-arm off break	2018	₹80 lakh (US$84,000)	
27	Nitish Rana	India	27 December 1993 (aged 24)	Left-handed	Right-arm off break	2018	₹3.4 crore (US$356,000)	
37	**Robin Uthappa**	India	11 September 1985 (aged 32)	Right-handed	Right-arm medium	2018	₹6.4 crore (US$670,000)	Vice-captain
50	**Chris Lynn**	Australia	10 April 1990 (aged 27)	Right-handed	Slow left-arm orthodox	2018	₹9.6 crore (US$1.0 million)	Overseas
77	Shubman Gill	India	8 September 1999 (aged 18)	Right-handed	Right-arm off break	2018	₹1.8 crore (US$188,000)	
99	Ishank Jaggi	India	27 January 1989 (aged 29)	Right-handed	Right-arm leg break	2018	₹20 lakh (US$21,000)	
24	Cameron Delport	South Africa	12 May 1989 (aged 28)	Left-handed	Right-arm medium	2018	₹30 lakh (US$31,000)	Overseas
All-rounders
12	**Andre Russell**	Jamaica	29 April 1988 (aged 29)	Right-handed	Right-arm fast-medium	2018	₹7 crore (US$733,033.70)	Overseas
74	**Sunil Narine**	Trinidad and Tobago	26 May 1988 (aged 29)	Left-handed	Right-arm off break	2018	₹8.5 crore (US$890,112.40)	Overseas
86	Javon Searles	Barbados	21 December 1986 (aged 31)	Right-handed	Right-arm fast-medium	2018	date₹30 lakh (US$31,000)	Overseas
Wicket-keepers
19	**Dinesh Karthik**	India	1 June 1985 (aged 32)	Right-handed	Right-arm off break	2018	₹7.4 crore (US$774,921.30)	Captain
Bowlers
21	**Piyush Chawla**	India	24 December 1988 (aged 29)	Left-handed	Right-arm leg break	2018	₹4.2 crore (US$440,000)	
23	**Kuldeep Yadav**	India	14 December 1994 (aged 23)	Left-handed	Slow left-arm wrist-spin	2018	₹5.8 crore (US$607,000)	
33	**Vinay Kumar**	India	12 February 1984 (aged 34)	Right-handed	Right-arm medium-fast	2018	₹1 crore (US$105,000)	
43	Prasidh Krishna	India	19 February 1996 (aged 22)	Right-handed	Right-arm medium-fast	2018	₹20 lakh (US$21,000)	
14	**Mitchell Starc**	Australia	30 January 1990 (aged 28)	Left-handed	Left-arm fast	2018	₹9.4 crore (US$984,359.50)	Overseas

== Season ==
=== League table ===
Pos	Team	Pld	W	L	NR	Pts	NRR	
1	Sunrisers Hyderabad (RU)	14	9	5	0	18	0.284	Advanced to Qualifier 1
2	Chennai Super Kings (C)	14	9	5	0	18	0.253	Advanced to Qualifier 1
3	Kolkata Knight Riders (3)	14	8	6	0	16	−0.070	Advanced to the Eliminator
4	Rajasthan Royals (4)	14	7	7	0	14	−0.250	Advanced to the Eliminator
5	Mumbai Indians	14	6	8	0	12	0.317	
6	Royal Challengers Bangalore	14	6	8	0	12	0.129	
7	Kings XI Punjab	14	6	8	0	12	−0.502	
8	Delhi Daredevils	14	5	9	0	10	−0.222	

Source: ESPNcricinfo
The four top ranked teams qualify for the playoffs.

=== Results ===
==== League matches ====
8 April 2018
20:00 (D/N)
Scorecard

Royal Challengers Bangalore; 176/7 (20 overs)	v	Kolkata Knight Riders (H); 177/6 (18.5 overs)
AB de Villiers 44 (23); Nitish Rana 2/11 (1 over)		Sunil Narine 50 (19); Chris Woakes 3/36 (4 overs)

Kolkata Knight Riders won by 4 wickets
Eden Gardens, Kolkata
Umpires: Abhijit Deshmukh (India) and Chettithody Shamshuddin (India)
Player of the match: Sunil Narine (Kolkata Knight Riders)

- Kolkata Knight Riders won the toss and elected to field.
- Brendon McCullum (Royal Challengers Bangalore) scored his 9,000th T20 run.

10 April 2018
20:00 (D/N)
Scorecard

Kolkata Knight Riders; 202/6 (20 overs)	v	Chennai Super Kings (H); 205/5 (19.5 overs)
Andre Russell 88* (36); Shane Watson 2/39 (4 overs)		Sam Billings 56 (23); Tom Curran 2/39 (3 overs)

Chennai Super Kings won by 5 wickets
M. A. Chidambaram Stadium, Chennai
Umpires: Anil Chaudhary (India) and Chris Gaffaney (New Zealand)
Player of the match: Sam Billings (Chennai Super Kings)

- Chennai Super Kings won the toss and elected to field.

14 April 2018
20:00 (D/N)
Scorecard

(H) Kolkata Knight Riders; 138/8 (20 overs)	v	Sunrisers Hyderabad; 139/5 (19 overs)
Chris Lynn 49 (34); Bhuvneshwar Kumar 3/26 (4 overs)		Kane Williamson 50 (44); Sunil Narine 2/17 (4 overs)

Sunrisers Hyderabad won by 5 wickets
Eden Gardens, Kolkata
Umpires: Anil Chaudhary (India) and Nand Kishore (India)
Player of the match: Billy Stanlake (Sunrisers Hyderabad)

- Sunrisers Hyderabad won the toss and elected to field.
- Shivam Mavi and Shubman Gill (both Kolkata Knight Riders) made their T20 debuts.

16 April 2018
20:00 (D/N)
Scorecard

(H) Kolkata Knight Riders; 200/9 (20 overs)	v	Delhi Daredevils; 129 (14.2 overs)
Nitish Rana 59 (35); Rahul Tewatia 3/18 (3 overs)		Glenn Maxwell 47 (22); Sunil Narine 3/18 (3 overs)

Kolkata Knight Riders won by 71 runs
Eden Gardens, Kolkata
Umpires: Anil Chaudhary (India) and Nand Kishore (India)
Player of the match: Nitish Rana (Kolkata Knight Riders)

- Delhi Daredevils won the toss and elected to field.

18 April 2018
20:00 (D/N)
Scorecard

(H) Rajasthan Royals; 160/8 (20 overs)	v	Kolkata Knight Riders; 163/3 (18.5 overs)
D'Arcy Short 44 (43); Nitish Rana 2/11 (2 overs)		Robin Uthappa 48 (36); Krishnappa Gowtham 2/23 (4 overs)

Kolkata Knight Riders won by 7 wickets
Sawai Mansingh Stadium, Jaipur
Umpires: Abhijit Deshmukh (India) and Sundaram Ravi (India)
Player of the match: Nitish Rana (Kolkata Knight Riders)

- Kolkata Knight Riders won the toss and elected to field.

21 April 2018
16:00 (D/N)
Scorecard

(H) Kolkata Knight Riders; 191/7 (20 overs)	v	Kings XI Punjab; 126/1 (11.1 overs)
Chris Lynn 74 (41); Andrew Tye 2/30 (4 overs)		Chris Gayle 62* (38); Sunil Narine 1/23 (3 overs)

Kings XI Punjab won by 9 wickets (DLS method)
Eden Gardens, Kolkata
Umpires: Abhijit Deshmukh (India) and Chettithody Shamshuddin (India)
Player of the match: K. L. Rahul (Kings XI Punjab)

- Kings XI Punjab won the toss and elected to field.
- Rain interrupted play after 8.2 overs of the Kings XI Punjab innings and the target was revised to 125 runs from 13 overs.

27 April 2018
20:00 (D/N)
Scorecard

(H) Delhi Daredevils; 219/4 (20 overs)	v	Kolkata Knight Riders; 164/9 (20 overs)
Shreyas Iyer 93* (40); Andre Russell 1/28 (3 overs)		Andre Russell 44 (30); Glenn Maxwell 2/22 (2 overs)

Delhi Daredevils won by 55 runs
Feroz Shah Kotla, Delhi
Umpires: Sundaram Ravi (India) and Chettithody Shamshuddin (india)
Player of the match: Shreyas Iyer (Delhi Daredevils)

- Kolkata Knight Riders won the toss and elected to field.

29 April 2018
20:00 (D/N)
Scorecard

(H) Royal Challengers Bangalore; 175/4 (20 overs)	v	Kolkata Knight Riders; 176/4 (19.1 overs)
Virat Kohli 68* (44); Andre Russell 3/31 (3 overs)		Chris Lynn 62* (52); Murugan Ashwin 2/36 (4 overs)

Kolkata Knight Riders won by 6 wickets
M. Chinnaswamy Stadium, Bangalore
Umpires: Anil Chaudhary (India) and Nigel Llong (England)
Player of the match: Chris Lynn (Kolkata Knight Riders)

- Kolkata Knight Riders won the toss and elected to field.

3 May 2018
20:00 (D/N)
Scorecard

Chennai Super Kings; 177/5 (20 overs)	v	Kolkata Knight Riders (H); 180/4 (17.4 overs)
MS Dhoni 43* (25); Sunil Narine 2/20 (4 overs)		Shubman Gill 57* (36); Harbhajan Singh 1/20 (3 overs)

Kolkata Knight Riders won by 6 wickets
Eden Gardens, Kolkata
Umpires: Abhijit Deshmukh (India) and Kumar Dharmasena (Sri Lanka)
Player of the match: Sunil Narine (Kolkata Knight Riders)

- Kolkata Knight Riders won the toss and elected to field.

6 May 2018
16:00 (D/N)
Scorecard

(H) Mumbai Indians; 181/4 (20 overs)	v	Kolkata Knight Riders; 168/6 (20 overs)
Suryakumar Yadav 59 (39); Andre Russell 2/12 (2 overs)		Robin Uthappa 54 (35); Hardik Pandya 2/19 (4 overs)

Mumbai Indians won by 13 runs
Wankhede Stadium, Mumbai
Umpires: Abhijit Deshmukh (India) and Kumar Dharmasena (Sri Lanka)
Player of the match: Hardik Pandya (Mumbai Indians)

- Kolkata Knight Riders won the toss and elected to field.

9 May 2018
20:00 (D/N)
Scorecard

Mumbai Indians; 210/6 (20 overs)	v	Kolkata Knight Riders (H); 108 (18.1 overs)
Ishan Kishan 62 (21); Piyush Chawla 3/48 (4 overs)		Chris Lynn 21 (15); Krunal Pandya 2/12 (3.1 overs)

Mumbai Indians won by 102 runs
Eden Gardens, Kolkata
Umpires: K. N. Ananthapadmanabhan (India) and Anil Chaudhary (India)
Player of the match: Ishan Kishan (Mumbai Indians)

- Kolkata Knight Riders won the toss and elected to field.

12 May 2018
16:00 (D/N)
Scorecard

Kolkata Knight Riders; 245/6 (20 overs)	v	Kings XI Punjab (H); 214/8 (20 overs)
Sunil Narine 75 (36); Andrew Tye 4/41 (4 overs)		K. L. Rahul 66 (29); Andre Russell 3/41 (4 overs)

Kolkata Knight Riders won by 31 runs
Holkar Cricket Stadium, Indore
Umpires: C. K. Nandan (India) and Virender Sharma (India)
Player of the match: Sunil Narine (Kolkata Knight Riders)

- Kings XI Punjab won the toss and elected to field.

15 May 2018
20:00 (D/N)
Scorecard

Rajasthan Royals; 142 (19 overs)	v	Kolkata Knight Riders (H); 145/4 (18 overs)
Jos Buttler 39 (22); Kuldeep Yadav 4/20 (4 overs)		Chris Lynn 45 (42); Ben Stokes 3/15 (4 overs)

Kolkata Knight Riders won by 6 wickets
Eden Gardens, Kolkata
Umpires: Anil Chaudhary (India) and Kumar Dharmasena (Sri Lanka)
Player of the match: Kuldeep Yadav (Kolkata Knight Riders)

- Kolkata Knight Riders won the toss and elected to field.

19 May 2018
20:00 (D/N)
Scorecard

(H) Sunrisers Hyderabad; 172/9 (20 overs)	v	Kolkata Knight Riders; 173/5 (19.4 overs)
Shikhar Dhawan 50 (39); Prasidh Krishna 4/30 (4 overs)		Chris Lynn 55 (43); Carlos Brathwaite 2/21 (2.4 overs)

Kolkata Knight Riders won by 5 wickets
Rajiv Gandhi International Cricket Stadium, Hyderabad
Umpires: Anil Chaudhary (India) and Sundaram Ravi (India)
Player of the match: Chris Lynn (Kolkata Knight Riders)

- Sunrisers Hyderabad won the toss and elected to bat.
- Kolkata Knight Riders qualified for the playoffs as a result of this match.

== Statistics ==
=== Most runs ===
Name	Matches	Inns	Runs	HS	Avg	SR
Dinesh Karthik	16	16	498	52	49.80	147.77
Chris Lynn	16	16	491	74	32.73	130.23
Sunil Narine	16	16	357	75	22.31	189.89
Robin Uthappa	16	16	351	54	21.93	132.45
Andre Russell	16	16	316	88*	28.72	184.79

- Source: ESPNcricinfo

=== Most wickets ===
Name	Matches	Wkts	BBI	Ave	Eco
Kuldeep Yadav	16	17	4/20	24.58	8.14
Sunil Narine	16	17	3/18	27.47	7.65
Piyush Chawla	15	14	3/48	29.42	8.40
Andre Russell	16	13	3/31	27.30	9.38
Prasidh Krishna	7	10	4/30	26.00	9.28

- Source: ESPNcricinfo
