= 2018 Delhi Daredevils season =

Indian Premier League cricket team season

Delhi Daredevils
2018 season
- Coach: Ricky Ponting
- Captain: Gautam Gambhir
- Ground(s): Feroz Shah Kotla, Delhi
- IPL: 8th
- Most runs: Rishabh Pant (684)
- Most wickets: Trent Boult (18)

Delhi Daredevils (DD) are a franchise cricket team based in Delhi, India, which plays in the Indian Premier League (IPL). They were one of the eight teams that competed in the 2018 Indian Premier League.

== Auction ==
Each franchise was allowed to retain a maximum of five players from their current squad, subject to the following restrictions:

- A maximum of 3 players could be retained before the 2018 IPL auction
- A maximum of 3 players could be retained through a right-to-match card during the auction.
- A maximum of 3 capped Indian players could be retained.
- A maximum of 2 uncapped Indian players could be retained.
- A maximum of 2 overseas (non-Indian) players could be retained.

The auction was held on 27–28 January in Bangalore.

The following three players were retained by Delhi:

- Chris Morris
- Shreyas Iyer
- Rishabh Pant

The franchise acquired the following players during the auction:

- Prithvi Shaw
- Abhishek Sharma
- Manjot Kalra
- Colin Munro
- Trent Boult
- Gautam Gambhir
- Jason Roy
- Amit Mishra
- Shahbaz Nadeem
- Naman Ojha
- Glenn Maxwell
- Harshal Patel
- Rahul Tewatia
- Jayant Yadav
- Vijay Shankar
- Mohammed Shami
- Daniel Christian
- Gurkeerat Singh
- Kagiso Rabada
- Avesh Khan
- Sayan Ghosh
- Sandeep Lamichhane

== Current squad ==
- Players with international caps are listed in **bold**.

No.	Name	Nationality	Birth date	Batting style	Bowling style	Year signed	Salary	Notes
Batsmen
23	**Gautam Gambhir**	India	14 October 1981 (aged 36)	Left-handed	Right-arm leg break	2018	₹2.8 crore (US$327,000)	
41	**Shreyas Iyer**	India	6 December 1994 (aged 23)	Right-handed	Right-arm leg break	2018	₹7 crore (US$817,322.00)	Captain
82	**Colin Munro**	New Zealand	11 March 1987 (aged 31)	Left-handed	Right-arm medium-fast	2018	₹1.9 crore (US$222,000)	Overseas
100	Prithvi Shaw	India	9 November 1999 (aged 18)	Right-handed	Right-arm off break	2018	₹1.2 crore (US$140,000)	
—	**Gurkeerat Singh**	India	29 June 1990 (aged 27)	Right-handed	Right-arm off break	2018	₹75 lakh (US$88,000)	
—	Manjot Kalra	India	15 January 1999 (aged 19)	Left-handed		2018	₹20 lakh (US$23,000)	
All-rounders
2	**Chris Morris**	South Africa	30 April 1987 (aged 30)	Right-handed	Right-arm fast-medium	2018	₹7.1 crore (US$828,998.00)	Overseas
4	Abhishek Sharma	India	4 September 2000 (aged 17)	Left-handed	Slow left-arm orthodox	2018	₹55 lakh (US$64,000)	
14	Rahul Tewatia	India	20 May 1993 (aged 24)	Left-handed	Right-arm leg break	2018	₹3 crore (US$350,000)	
19	**Jayant Yadav**	India	22 January 1990 (aged 28)	Right-handed	Right-arm off break	2018	₹50 lakh (US$58,000)	
32	**Glenn Maxwell**	Australia	14 October 1988 (aged 29)	Right-handed	Right-arm off break	2018	₹9 crore (US$1.1 million)	Overseas
54	**Daniel Christian**	Australia	4 May 1983 (aged 34)	Right-handed	Right-arm medium-fast	2018	₹1.5 crore (US$175,000)	Overseas
59	**Vijay Shankar**	India	26 January 1991 (aged 27)	Right-handed	Right-arm medium-fast	2018	₹3.2 crore (US$374,000)	
Wicket-keepers
48	**Naman Ojha**	India	20 July 1983 (aged 34)	Right-handed	Right-arm medium	2018	₹1.4 crore (US$163,000)	
777	**Rishabh Pant**	India	4 October 1997 (aged 20)	Left-handed	Right-arm medium	2018	₹8 crore (US$934,082.20)	
Bowlers
1	**Sandeep Lamichhane**	Nepal	2 August 2000 (aged 17)	Right-handed	Right-arm leg break	2018	₹20 lakh (US$23,000)	Overseas
3	**Junior Dala**	South Africa	29 December 1989 (aged 28)	Right-handed	Right-arm fast	2018	NA	Overseas
6	Avesh Khan	India	13 December 1996 (aged 21)	Right-handed	Right-arm medium-fast	2018	₹70 lakh (US$82,000)	
11	**Mohammed Shami**	India	3 September 1990 (aged 27)	Right-handed	Right-arm fast-medium	2018	₹3 crore (US$350,000)	
13	Harshal Patel	India	23 November 1990 (aged 27)	Right-handed	Right-arm medium-fast	2018	₹20 lakh (US$23,000)	
17	**Liam Plunkett**	England	6 April 1985 (aged 33)	Right-handed	Right-arm fast	2018	₹2 crore (US$234,000)	Overseas
18	**Trent Boult**	New Zealand	22 July 1989 (aged 28)	Right-handed	Left-arm fast-medium	2018	₹2.2 crore (US$257,000)	Overseas
88	Shahbaz Nadeem	India	12 August 1989 (aged 28)	Right-handed	Slow left-arm orthodox	2018	₹3.2 crore (US$374,000)	
99	**Amit Mishra**	India	24 November 1982 (aged 35)	Right-handed	Right-arm leg break	2018	₹4 crore (US$467,000)	
—	Sayan Ghosh	India	16 September 1992 (aged 25)	Right-handed	Right-arm medium	2018	₹20 lakh (US$23,000)	
—	**Kagiso Rabada**	South Africa	25 May 1995 (aged 22)	Left-handed	Right-arm fast	2018	₹4.2 crore (US$490,000)	Overseas

== Season ==
=== League table ===
Pos	Team	Pld	W	L	NR	Pts	NRR	
1	Sunrisers Hyderabad (RU)	14	9	5	0	18	0.284	Advanced to Qualifier 1
2	Chennai Super Kings (C)	14	9	5	0	18	0.253	Advanced to Qualifier 1
3	Kolkata Knight Riders (3)	14	8	6	0	16	−0.070	Advanced to the Eliminator
4	Rajasthan Royals (4)	14	7	7	0	14	−0.250	Advanced to the Eliminator
5	Mumbai Indians	14	6	8	0	12	0.317	
6	Royal Challengers Bangalore	14	6	8	0	12	0.129	
7	Kings XI Punjab	14	6	8	0	12	−0.502	
8	Delhi Daredevils	14	5	9	0	10	−0.222	

Source: ESPNcricinfo
The four top ranked teams qualify for the playoffs.

=== Fixtures ===
8 April
16:00 (D/N)
Scorecard

Delhi Daredevils; 166/7 (20 overs)	v	Kings XI Punjab (H); 167/4 (18.5 overs)
Gautam Gambhir 55 (42); Mujeeb Ur Rahman 2/28 (4 overs)		K. L. Rahul 51 (16); Daniel Christian 1/12 (2 overs)

Kings XI Punjab won by 6 wickets
Punjab Cricket Association Stadium, Mohali
Umpires: K. N. Ananthapadmanabhan (India) and Rod Tucker (Australia)
Player of the match: K. L. Rahul (Kings XI Punjab)

- Kings XI Punjab won the toss and elected to field.
- Mujeeb Ur Rahman (Kings XI Punjab) became the youngest cricketer to play in the IPL.
- K. L. Rahul (Kings XI Punjab) scored the fastest fifty in the IPL.

11 April
20:00 (D/N)
Scorecard

(H) Rajasthan Royals; 153/5 (17.5 overs)	v	Delhi Daredevils; 60/4 (6 overs)
Ajinkya Rahane 45 (40); Shahbaz Nadeem 2/34 (4 overs)		Rishabh Pant 20 (14); Ben Laughlin 2/20 (2 overs)

Rajasthan Royals won by 10 runs (DLS method)
Sawai Mansingh Stadium, Jaipur
Umpires: K. N. Ananthapadmanabhan (India) and Nitin Menon (India)
Player of the match: Sanju Samson (Rajasthan Royals)

- Delhi Daredevils won the toss and elected to field.
- Rain during play ended the Rajasthan Royals innings at 17.5 overs and Delhi Daredevils were set a target of 71 runs from 6 overs.

14 April
16:00 (D/N)
Scorecard

(H) Mumbai Indians; 194/7 (20 overs)	v	Delhi Daredevils; 195/3 (20 overs)
Suryakumar Yadav 53 (32); Daniel Christian 3/35 (3 overs)		Jason Roy 91* (53); Krunal Pandya 2/21 (3 overs)

Delhi Daredevils won by 7 wickets
Wankhede Stadium, Mumbai
Umpires: K. N. Ananthapadmanabhan (India) and Nitin Menon (India)
Player of the match: Jason Roy (Delhi Daredevils)

- Delhi Daredevils won the toss and elected to field.

16 April
20:00 (D/N)
Scorecard

(H) Kolkata Knight Riders; 200/9 (20 overs)	v	Delhi Daredevils; 129 (14.2 overs)
Nitish Rana 59 (35); Rahul Tewatia 3/18 (3 overs)		Glenn Maxwell 47 (22); Sunil Narine 3/18 (3 overs)

Kolkata Knight Riders won by 71 runs
Eden Gardens, Kolkata
Umpires: Anil Chaudhary (India) and Nand Kishore (India)
Player of the match: Nitish Rana (Kolkata Knight Riders)

- Delhi Daredevils won the toss and elected to field.

21 April
20:00 (D/N)
Scorecard

Delhi Daredevils; 174/5 (20 overs)	v	Royal Challengers Bangalore (H); 176/4 (18 overs)
Rishabh Pant 85 (48); Yuzvendra Chahal 2/22 (3 overs)		AB de Villiers 90* (39); Glenn Maxwell 1/13 (2 overs)

Royal Challengers Bangalore won by 6 wickets
M. Chinnaswamy Stadium, Bangalore
Umpires: Chris Gaffaney (New Zealand) and C. K. Nandan (India)
Player of the match: AB de Villiers (Royal Challengers Bangalore)

- Royal Challengers Bangalore won the toss and elected to field.

23 April
20:00 (D/N)
Scorecard

Kings XI Punjab; 143/8 (20 overs)	v	Delhi Daredevils (H); 139/8 (20 overs)
Karun Nair 34 (32); Liam Plunkett 3/17 (4 overs)		Shreyas Iyer 57 (45); Ankit Rajpoot 2/23 (4 overs)

Kings XI Punjab won by 4 runs
Feroz Shah Kotla, Delhi
Umpires: C. K. Nandan (India) and Nand Kishore (India)
Player of the match: Ankit Rajpoot (Kings XI Punjab)

- Delhi Daredevils won the toss and elected to field.
- Prithvi Shaw (Delhi Daredevils) made his T20 debut.

27 April
20:00 (D/N)
Scorecard

(H) Delhi Daredevils; 219/4 (20 overs)	v	Kolkata Knight Riders; 164/9 (20 overs)
Shreyas Iyer 93* (40); Andre Russell 1/28 (3 overs)		Andre Russell 44 (30); Glenn Maxwell 2/22 (2 overs)

Delhi Daredevils won by 55 runs
Feroz Shah Kotla, Delhi
Umpires: Sundaram Ravi (India) and Chettithody Shamshuddin (india)
Player of the match: Shreyas Iyer (Delhi Daredevils)

- Kolkata Knight Riders won the toss and elected to field.

30 April
20:00 (D/N)
Scorecard

(H) Chennai Super Kings; 211/4 (20 overs)	v	Delhi Daredevils; 198/5 (20 overs)
Shane Watson 78 (40); Glenn Maxwell 1/5 (1 over)		Rishabh Pant 79 (45); K. M. Asif 2/43 (3 overs)

Chennai Super Kings won by 13 runs
Maharashtra Cricket Association Stadium, Pune
Umpires: Anil Dandekar (India) and Chettithody Shamshuddin (India)
Player of the match: Shane Watson (Chennai Super Kings)

- Delhi Daredevils won the toss and elected to field.
- Chennai Super Kings recorded their 100th T20 victory.

2 May
20:00 (D/N)
Scorecard

(H) Delhi Daredevils; 196/6 (17.1 overs)	v	Rajasthan Royals; 146/5 (12 overs)
Rishabh Pant 69 (29); Jaydev Unadkat 3/46 (4 overs)		Jos Buttler 67 (26); Trent Boult 2/26 (3 overs)

Delhi Daredevils won by 4 runs (DLS method)
Feroz Shah Kotla, Delhi
Umpires: C. K. Nandan (India) and Virender Sharma (India)
Player of the match: Rishabh Pant (Delhi Daredevils)

- Rajasthan Royals won the toss and elected to field.
- Rain before start of play reduced the match to 18 overs per side.
- Rain during play ended the Delhi Daredevils innings at 17.1 overs and Rajasthan Royals were set a target of 151 runs from 12 overs.

5 May
20:00 (D/N)
Scorecard

Delhi Daredevils; 163/5 (20 overs)	v	Sunrisers Hyderabad (H); 164/3 (19.5 overs)
Prithvi Shaw 65 (36); Rashid Khan 2/23 (4 overs)		Alex Hales 45 (31); Amit Mishra 2/19 (4 overs)

Sunrisers Hyderabad won by 7 wickets
Rajiv Gandhi International Cricket Stadium, Hyderabad
Umpires: C. K. Nandan (India) and Bruce Oxenford (Australia)
Player of the match: Rashid Khan (Sunrisers Hyderabad)

- Delhi Daredevils won the toss and elected to bat.

10 May
20:00 (D/N)
Scorecard

(H) Delhi Daredevils; 187/5 (20 overs)	v	Sunrisers Hyderabad; 191/1 (18.5 overs)
Rishabh Pant 128* (63); Shakib Al Hasan 2/27 (4 overs)		Shikhar Dhawan 92* (50); Harshal Patel 1/32 (4 overs)

Sunrisers Hyderabad won by 9 wickets
Feroz Shah Kotla, Delhi
Umpires: Anil Dandekar (India) and Chettithody Shamshuddin (India)
Player of the match: Shikhar Dhawan (Sunrisers Hyderabad)

- Delhi Daredevils won the toss and elected to bat.
- Sunrisers Hyderabad qualified for the playoffs as a result of this match.

12 May
20:00 (D/N)
Scorecard

(H) Delhi Daredevils; 181/4 (20 overs)	v	Royal Challengers Bangalore; 187/5 (19 overs)
Rishabh Pant 61 (34); Yuzvendra Chahal 2/28 (4 overs)		AB de Villiers 72* (37); Trent Boult 2/40 (4 overs)

Royal Challengers Bangalore won by 5 wickets
Feroz Shah Kotla, Delhi
Umpires: K. N. Ananthapadmanabhan (India) and Kumar Dharmasena (Sri Lanka)
Player of the match: AB de Villiers (Royal Challengers Bangalore)

- Royal Challengers Bangalore won the toss and elected to field.
- Sandeep Lamichhane and Abhishek Sharma (both Delhi Daredevils) made their T20 debuts.
- Delhi Daredevils were eliminated as a result of this match.

18 May
20:00 (D/N)
Scorecard

(H) Delhi Daredevils; 162/5 (20 overs)	v	Chennai Super Kings; 128/6 (20 overs)
Rishabh Pant 38 (26); Lungi Ngidi 2/14 (3 overs)		Ambati Rayudu 50 (29); Trent Boult 2/20 (4 overs)

Delhi Daredevils won by 34 runs
Feroz Shah Kotla, Delhi
Umpires: Kumar Dharmasena (Sri Lanka) and Vineet Kulkarni (India)
Player of the match: Harshal Patel (Delhi Daredevils)

- Chennai Super Kings won the toss and elected to field.

20 May
16:00 (D/N)
Scorecard

(H) Delhi Daredevils; 174/4 (20 overs)	v	Mumbai Indians; 163 (19.3 overs)
Rishabh Pant 64 (44); Krunal Pandya 1/11 (2 overs)		Evin Lewis 48 (31); Amit Mishra 3/19 (4 overs)

Delhi Daredevils won by 11 runs
Feroz Shah Kotla, Delhi
Umpires: Kumar Dharmasena (Sri Lanka) and C. K. Nandan (India)
Player of the match: Amit Mishra (Delhi Daredevils)

- Delhi Daredevils won the toss and elected to bat.
- Mumbai Indians were eliminated as a result of this match.

== Statistics ==
=== Most runs ===
Name	Mat	Runs	HS	Ave	SR
Rishabh Pant	14	684	128*	52.61	173.60
Shreyas Iyer	14	411	93*	37.36	132.58
Prithvi Shaw	9	245	65	27.22	153.12
Vijay Shankar	13	212	54*	53.00	143.24
Glenn Maxwell	12	169	47	14.08	140.83

- Source: ESPNcricinfo

=== Most wickets ===
Name	Mat	Wkts	BBI	Ave	Eco
Trent Boult	14	18	2/20	25.88	8.84
Amit Mishra	10	12	3/19	22.00	7.13
Harshal Patel	5	7	3/28	23.85	9.54
Rahul Tewatia	8	6	3/18	28.83	7.86
Sandeep Lamichhane	3	5	3/36	16.40	6.83

- Source: ESPNcricinfo
