= Narendra Menon =

Indian cricketer (born 1946)

Personal information
- Full name: Narendra Narayan Menon
- Born: 7 January 1946 (age 80); Indore, Madhya Pradesh, India
- Batting: Right-handed
- Role: Wicket-keeper
- Relatives: Nitin Menon (son)

Umpiring information
- ODIs umpired: 4 (1993–1998)
- WODIs umpired: 1 (1997)
- WT20Is umpired: 1 (2018)
- Source: ESPNcricinfo, 26 June 2020

Narendra Narayan Menon (born 7 January 1946) is a former Indian first class cricketer. He played as a right-handed batsman and wicketkeeper. Born at Indore in Madhya Pradesh, he represented the Madhya Pradesh cricket team in Ranji Trophy. He served as an international umpire during 1993–98. He officiated a total of four One Day Internationals. His son, Nitin Menon, is also an international umpire.

== See also ==
- List of One Day International cricket umpires
