= Krishnappa Gowtham =

Indian cricketer (born 1988)

Personal information
- Born: 20 October 1988 (age 38); Bengaluru, Karnataka, India
- Height: 1.88 m (6 ft 2 in)
- Batting: Right-handed
- Bowling: Right-arm off-break
- Role: Bowling all-rounder

International information
- National side: India (2021)
- Only ODI (cap 238): 23 July 2021 v Sri Lanka
- ODI shirt no.: 34

Domestic team information
- Years: Team
- 2011/12–2023/24: Karnataka
- 2018–2019: Rajasthan Royals (squad no. 7)
- 2020: Kings XI Punjab (squad no. 25)
- 2022–2024: Lucknow Super Giants

Career statistics
Competition	FC	LA	T20
Matches	32	32	49
Runs scored	737	400	454
Batting average	18.89	21.05	14.64
100s/50s	1/2	0/1	0/2
Top score	149	57*	60
Balls bowled	6434	1639	852
Wickets	116	51	32
Bowling average	25.56	25.62	33.03
5 wickets in innings	7	1	0
10 wickets in match	1	0	0
Best bowling	7/72	5/28	4/19
Catches/stumpings	8/–	6/–	16/–
- Source: ESPNcricinfo, 7 August 2021

Krishnappa Gowtham (born 20 October 1988) is an Indian former cricketer who played for Karnataka. He made his international debut for India in July 2021. His father M. Krishnappa represented Karnataka in kabaddi.

== Career ==
Gowtham's professional career began when he was picked for the under-15 Zonal Tournament in Bangalore where he emerged as the second-highest wicket-taker. He played his first Ranji Trophy game for Karnataka in November 2012, against Bengal, and picked up two wickets, both in the second innings.

In the 2016–17 Ranji Trophy season, Gowtham picked up two consecutive five-wicket hauls, against Delhi and Assam, helping his team win both the games. In the latter game, he returned his career-best figures of 7/108.

In February 2017, Gowtham was bought by the Mumbai Indians team for the 2017 Indian Premier League for 2 crores. He made his List A debut for Karnataka in the 2016–17 Vijay Hazare Trophy on 25 February 2017.

In October 2017, Gowtham scored his maiden first-class century, batting for Karnataka against Assam in the 2017–18 Ranji Trophy.

In January 2018, Gowtham was bought by the Rajasthan Royals in the 2018 IPL auction. In October 2018, he was named in India B's squad for the 2018–19 Deodhar Trophy.

On 23 August 2019, in a Karnataka Premier League (KPL) match for Bellary Tuskers against Shivamogga Lions, Gowtham scored 134 runs off 56 deliveries and took 8 wickets for 15 runs. However, the matches in the KPL do not have full Twenty20 status. In October 2019, he was named in India B's squad for the 2019–20 Deodhar Trophy.

In January 2021, Gowtham was named as one of five net bowlers in India's Test squad for their series against England. In February 2021, Gowtham was bought by the Chennai Super Kings in the IPL auction ahead of the 2021 Indian Premier League. Gowtham became the most expensive uncapped player in the history of IPL, with a price of INR 9.25 crores.

In June 2021, Gowtham was named in India's One Day International (ODI) and Twenty20 International (T20I) squads for their series against Sri Lanka. He made his ODI debut on 23 July 2021, for India against Sri Lanka. His maiden international wicket was Minod Bhanuka.

In February 2022, he was bought by the Lucknow Super Giants in the 2022 Indian Premier League auction.

In December 2025, he announced his retirement from all forms of the game after playing for 14 years.
