= Shreyas Gopal =

Indian cricketer (born 1993)

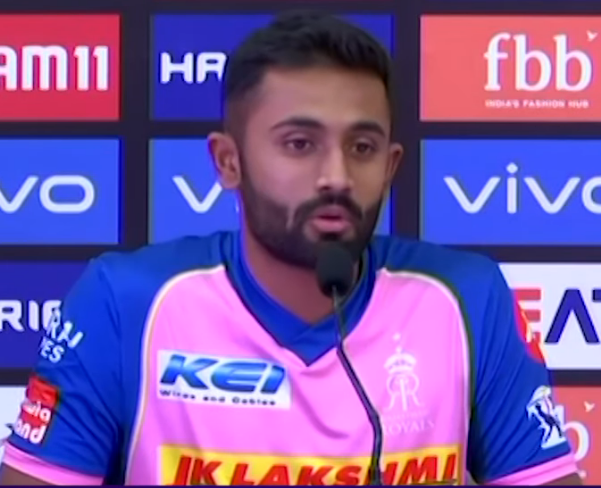
- Gopal in a post-match presentation during 2019 IPL

Personal information
- Full name: Ramswamy Shreyas Gopal
- Born: 4 September 1993 (age 33); Bangalore, Karnataka, India
- Batting: Right-handed
- Bowling: Right-arm leg break
- Role: All-rounder

Domestic team information
- Years: Team
- 2013/14–2022/23, 2024/25–: Karnataka
- 2014–2017, 2024: Mumbai Indians (squad no. 19)
- 2018–2021: Rajasthan Royals (squad no. 37)
- 2022: Sunrisers Hyderabad
- 2023/24: Kerala cricket team
- 2025–Present: Chennai Super Kings

Career statistics
Competition	FC	LA	T20
Matches	88	75	104
Runs scored	3,577	974	526
Batting average	34.72	27.82	16.43
100s/50s	6/15	0/4	0/0
Top score	161*	64	48*
Balls bowled	12,421	3,340	1,936
Wickets	254	119	124
Bowling average	29.12	27.82	17.35
5 wickets in innings	8	2	3
10 wickets in match	0	0	0
Best bowling	5/17	5/19	5/11
Catches/stumpings	30/–	20/–	28/–
- Source: ESPNcricinfo, 4 March 2025

Ramaswamy Shreyas Gopal (born 4 September 1993) is an Indian cricketer who plays for Karnataka in domestic cricket. He is an all-rounder who bats right-handed, and bowls leg break. He played three ODIs for India Under-19 cricket team in 2011. He had captained Karnataka at various age levels such as Under-13, Under-15, Under-16 and Under-19.

== Domestic career ==
Gopal made his debut for Karnataka in 2013. On 12 February 2014, Gopal picked the first hat-trick in Irani Cup history against Rest of India, which helped Karnataka win the Irani Cup. In August 2019, he was named in the India Blue team's squad for the 2019–20 Duleep Trophy.

In October 2018, he was named in India A's squad for the 2018–19 Deodhar Trophy.

== Indian Premier League ==
He was bought by Mumbai Indians in the 2014 IPL auction, where he spent four seasons.

In January 2018, he was bought by the Rajasthan Royals in the 2018 IPL auction. On 30 April 2019, he took a hat-trick against Royal Challengers Bangalore in the 2019 Indian Premier League, which included the wickets of Virat Kohli, AB de Villiers and Marcus Stoinis. Shreyas Gopal picked up a hat-trick in the shortest IPL game ever.

In February 2022, he was bought by the Sunrisers Hyderabad in the auction for the 2022 Indian Premier League tournament.

He was bought by Chennai Super Kings in the 2024 IPL auction.

== Personal life ==
Shreyas Gopal studied at The Frank Anthony Public School, Bangalore. He completed his BCom (Bachelor of Commerce) from Jain University.

His father Ramaswamy Gopal was a club cricketer for 20 years while his mother Amitha played volleyball at state level. During his childhood he liked to imitate the bowling action of his role model Anil Kumble.

Shreyas Gopal married his long-time girlfriend Nikitha on 24 November 2021.
