= Yeshwant Barde =

Indian cricketer (born 1973)

Personal information
- Full name: Yeshwant Chandrakant Barde
- Born: 15 February 1973 (age 53); Mapusa, Goa, India
- Role: Umpire

Umpiring information
- WT20Is umpired: 5 (2015–2019)
- Source: Cricinfo, 26 April 2018

Yeshwant Barde (born 15 February 1973) is an Indian former first-class cricketer. He is now an umpire and has stood in matches in the Ranji Trophy and the Indian Premier League.
