= Abhijit Deshmukh (umpire) =

Indian cricket umpire (born 1970)

Personal information
- Full name: Abhijit Deshmukh
- Born: 24 December 1970 (age 55); Nagpur, Maharashtra, India
- Role: Umpire

Umpiring information
- WT20Is umpired: 3 (2019)
- Source: ESPNcricinfo, 30 April 2018

Abhijit Deshmukh (born 24 December 1970) is an Indian cricket umpire. He has stood in matches in the Ranji Trophy tournament. In March 2019, he was one of the on-field umpires for the first Women's Twenty20 International (WT20I) between India and England at the Barsapara Stadium in Guwahati.
