= Umesh Yadav =

Indian cricketer

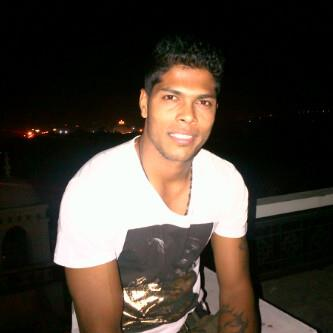

Personal information
- Full name: Umeshkumar Tilak Yadav
- Born: 25 October 1987 (age 39); Nagpur, Maharashtra, India
- Batting: Right-handed
- Bowling: Right-arm fast
- Role: Bowler

International information
- National side: India (2010–2023)
- Test debut (cap 272): 6 November 2011 v West Indies
- Last Test: 7 June 2023 v Australia
- ODI debut (cap 184): 28 May 2010 v Zimbabwe
- Last ODI: 24 October 2018 v West Indies
- ODI shirt no.: 19 (formerly 73, 50)
- T20I debut (cap 42): 7 August 2012 v Sri Lanka
- Last T20I: 4 October 2022 v South Africa
- T20I shirt no.: 70 (formerly 19 and 73)

Domestic team information
- Years: Team
- 2008–2026: Vidarbha
- 2010–2013: Delhi Daredevils
- 2014–2017: Kolkata Knight Riders
- 2018–2020: Royal Challengers Bangalore
- 2021: Delhi Capitals
- 2022: Middlesex
- 2022-2023: Kolkata Knight Riders
- 2023: Essex
- 2024: Gujarat Titans
- 2026-Present: Punjab

Career statistics
Competition	Test	ODI	T20I	FC
Matches	57	75	9	124
Runs scored	460	79	22	1,479
Batting average	11.21	7.90	22.00	14.64
100s/50s	0/0	0/0	0/0	1/2
Top score	31	18*	20*	128*
Balls bowled	8,979	3,558	180	20,445
Wickets	170	106	12	380
Bowling average	30.95	33.63	23.33	29.71
5 wickets in innings	3	0	0	15
10 wickets in match	1	0	0	2
Best bowling	6/88	4/31	2/19	7/48
Catches/stumpings	19/–	22/–	3/–	39/–
Medal record
Men's Cricket
Representing India
ICC World Test Championship
Runner-up	2019-2021
Runner-up	2021-2023
ICC Champions Trophy
Winner	2013 England & Wales
Runner-up	2017 England & Wales
- Source: ESPNcricinfo, 11 April 2025

Umeshkumar Tilak Yadav (born 25 October 1987) is an Indian cricketer who represented the Indian cricket team. He currently plays for Punjab in domestic cricket. He played 57 test matches for India and his fast-bowling contributed of India winning test matches particularly at home. Yadav was a member of the team that won the 2013 ICC Champions Trophy. He was the highest wicket-taker for India in the 2015 Cricket World Cup.

A right-arm fast bowler, Yadav has played for Vidarbha at domestic level since 2008 and is the first player from the team to have played Test cricket. He made his One Day International (ODI) debut against Zimbabwe in May 2010. The following year, in November, Yadav made his Test debut against the West Indies. He holds the record of the highest strike rate in an innings in Test cricket after scoring 31 runs in 10 balls at a strike rate of 310 against South Africa in October 2019.

== Personal life and domestic career ==
Before becoming a professional cricketer, Umesh unsuccessfully applied to join the army and the police force. Yadav tried to make a place in his college cricket team but was refused because he did not play for any club. Then, in the year 2007, having previously only ever played tennis ball cricket, Yadav joined Vidarbha Gymkhana (club affiliated to VCA; established in 1969 by J.A. Karnewar) and first time began bowling with a leather ball in Guzder League 'A' Division cricket tournament organised by Vidarbha Cricket Association (VCA). Pritam Gandhe, Vidharbha's Ranji trophy team captain, supported Yadav and ensured he represented Air India in a Twenty20 tournament. Of Yadav's early career, Gandhe remarked: "He was raw and wayward. But he was really quick – too quick. I thought that if he lands at least three out of six balls in line with the stumps, he will trouble batsmen."

On 3 November 2008, Yadav made his first-class debut for Vidarbha against Madhya Pradesh in the 2008–09 Ranji Trophy. His first wicket was that of Himalaya Sagar who was out bowled; Yadav did not bowl in Madhya Pradesh' second innings, but in the first claimed four wickets for 72 runs (4/75) as his team lost by ten wickets. He played in four of Vidarbha's Ranji matches that season, taking 20 wickets at an average of 14.60 with best figures of 6/105. Also in the 2008/09 season, Yadav made his one-day debut.

From playing for Vidarbha, Yadav was selected to represent the Central Zone in the Duleep Trophy in his first season.

On 16 April 2013, Umesh got engaged to Delhi-based fashion designer Tanya Wadhwa, and they were married on 29 May 2013. The couple have two daughters born in January 2021 and March 2023 respectively. Initially Umesh had troubled family life as his brother was acquitted in a robbery case.In his early years he moved from Jharkhand to Nagpur.

In January 2019, in the first semi-final of 2018/19 Ranji Trophy against Kerala, he gave his career-best performance of 7/48 in the first innings and then returned with figures of 5/31 in the second innings, and ended the match with career-best figures of 12/79 which sailed Vidarbha to the Ranji Trophy final.

=== Indian Premier League ===
Umesh was signed by Delhi Daredevils in 2010 and played for the franchise for four seasons. He was the fourth highest wicket-taker in the 2012 IPL with 19 wickets from 17 matches at an average of 23.84.

Ahead of the 2014 season, Umesh was bought by Kolkata Knight Riders. He played for the team for four season before being released ahead of the 2018 IPL auction during which he was bought by Royal Challengers Bangalore. He took 20 wickets from 14 matches in 2018. In 2019 he took eight 8 wickets from 11 matches and in 2020 only played in two matches.

Umesh was released by RCB ahead of the 2021 IPL auction and was bought by Delhi. In February 2022, he was bought by the Kolkata Knight Riders in the auction for the 2022 Indian Premier League tournament. In 2022 he gave best performance of his IPL career by taking 4 wicket against Punjab Kings. In 2024, he will play for Gujarat Titans after being released by KKR.

== International career ==
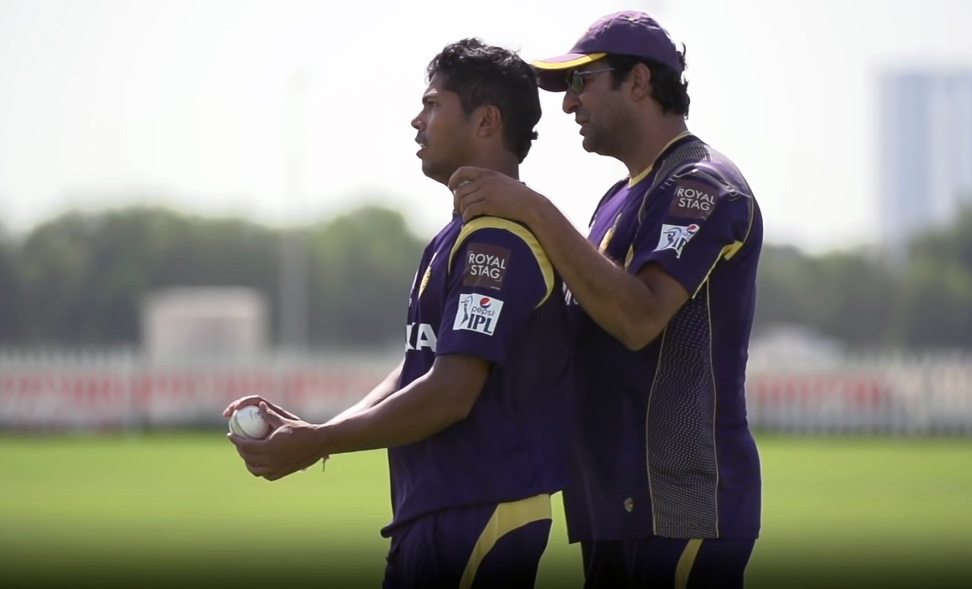
Umesh Yadav (left) and Wasim Akram (right), in a training session in IPL (2014)

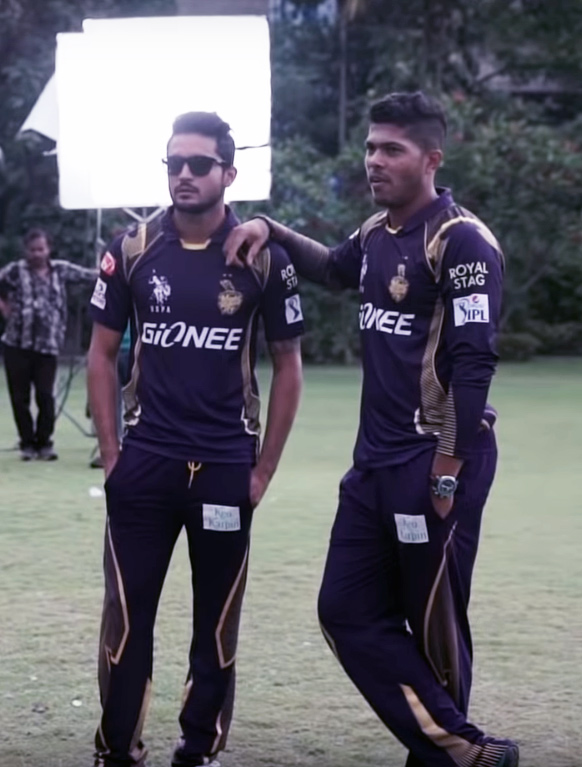
Manish Pandey (left) and Umesh Yadav (right), in an ad during IPL 2015

In May 2010, Yadav was called into India's squad for the World Twenty20 in place of the injured Praveen Kumar, but did not go on to play in the tournament. Later that month, he was included in the squad to play a tri-nation ODI series in Zimbabwe against the hosts and Sri Lanka. India sent an under-strength squad with nine first-choice players either rested or injured. Yadav made his ODI debut in the tournament during India's loss to Zimbabwe, a team ranked tenth by the ICC at the time. Defending a score of 285, Yadav bowled eight wicketless overs while conceding 48 runs. Playing in three matches, Yadav took a single wicket.

After the tri-series in Zimbabwe, Yadav returned to the fringes of the team. He was included as a practice bowler when India toured Sri Lanka in July to gain experience of bowling to Test batsmen. He would have to wait until October 2011 before his next international match. After India toured South Africa in December 2010, Yadav was dropped out of the national squad.

Yadav returned to the national set-up in September 2011 for a five-match ODI series against England. An injury to his left hand meant Yadav missed the last two ODIs. At times expensive though regularly fast, he managed four wickets at an average of 38.25 from three matches.

When the West Indies toured in November 2011, the Indian selectors opted to change the team's fast bowlers. Sreesanth and Praveen Kumar were left out of the squad and Yadav and Varun Aaron were chosen based on their performances in the ODIs against England earlier that year. Yadav made his Test debut in the first match and opened the bowling alongside Ishant Sharma in the first innings, though failed to take a wicket. In the second innings, the spinners opened the bowling and Yadav took two wickets for 36 runs (2/36) to help India to a five-wicket victory. Yadav was the first cricketer to play for Vidarbha who went on the play Test cricket. India also won the second Test, and Yadav finished with nine wickets in the series, the most amongst India's fast bowlers and less than half the total of either of the team's spinners. In the five-match ODI series that followed, he managed six wickets at an average of 24.33 from three appearances.

Yadav was selected as one of India's pace bowlers for their tour of Australia in 2011–12. He played in all four Tests, taking 14 wickets at an average of 39.35 as India lost the series 4–0. In the third Test at the WACA Ground in Perth, he took his first five-wicket haul in Test cricket, with figures of 5/93 in Australia's first and only innings. In the triangular ODI series with Australia and Sri Lanka that followed, Yadav managed 5 wickets from 6 matches at an average of 59.80.

In May 2013, Umesh was named in India's 15 member squad for the 2013 ICC Champions Trophy. He didn't have a great tournament as he had picked up just 4 wickets from all the 5 matches that he played in the tournament.

In December 2014, Umesh was named in India's 20 member squad for the 2015 Cricket World Cup. He was India's highest wicket-taker in the tournament with 18 wickets from 8 matches and was also the third highest wicket-taker in the tournament.

In May 2021, Umesh was named in India's 20 member Test squad for India's World Test Championship final against New Zealand and for India's 4 match Test series against England.

== Bowling style ==
Umesh is one of the fastest Indian bowler with his top speed being 152.5 km/h. Writing for ESPNcricinfo in January 2012, Sidharth Monga commented that

Yadav is fit, strong, quick, and gets the ball to swing late. More importantly, he attacks the stumps and doesn't wait for edges. Eleven of his 21 Test wickets have been bowled. Another has been lbw. Five matches is a short career for a bigger statistical analysis, but it is worth mentioning that he takes a wicket every 39.2 balls. It is not at large odds with his overall first-class strike-rate of 46.8. Attacking the stumps also leaves less control on the run flow, which shows in his economy rate of 4.24 in Tests.

Former Australian bowler Glenn McGrath was impressed with Yadav's performance in the first Test at the Melbourne Cricket Ground in January. McGrath said

He was quite impressive. He bowls at a good pace. He seems to have a great attitude and most importantly, he's a wicket-taking bowler. Perhaps, the direction and control are not there quite yet, but it's not far away. He's got that raw talent, good pace and can generate good bounce. He's got a lot going for him at the moment.

Former Indian cricketer Aakash Chopra, impressed by Umesh's performance in the Border–Gavaskar Trophy in 2017, said,

"It's not often that you see an Indian seamer outpace and outbowl his Australian counterparts but the spell that sealed the deal for India in Dharamshala did just that. Umesh Yadav bowled with a lot of steam on the third-day pitch and dismissed both openers before half the lead was wiped out. There are certain spells in Test matches that leave an indelible mark on one’s memory and his spell in Dharamshala will go down as one of them."
