= Nitin Menon =

Indian cricketer and umpire (born 1983)

Personal information
- Full name: Nitin Narendra Menon
- Born: 2 November 1983 (age 43); Indore, Madhya Pradesh, India
- Batting: Right-handed
- Role: Wicket-keeper
- Relatives: Narendra Menon (father)

Domestic team information
- Years: Team
- 2004: Madhya Pradesh
- List A debut: 8 January 2004 v Central Zone
- Last List A: 9 January 2004 v Central Zone

Umpiring information
- Tests umpired: 37 (2019–2026)
- ODIs umpired: 64 (2017–2026)
- T20Is umpired: 58 (2017–2026)
- WT20Is umpired: 10 (2018–2020)

Career statistics
Competition	List A
Matches	2
Runs scored	7
Batting average	7.00
100s/50s	0/0
Top score	7
Catches/stumpings	2/–
- Source: ESPNcricinfo, 23 November 2023

Nitin Narendra Menon (born 2 November 1983) is an Indian former cricketer and umpire. He was a right-handed batsman, representing Madhya Pradesh in List A cricket. He is now an umpire and has stood in matches in the 2015–16 Ranji Trophy and the Sheffield Shield in Australia. In June 2020, he was promoted to the Elite Panel of ICC Umpires, replacing Nigel Llong. His father Narendra Menon was also a cricketer and umpire.

== Umpiring career ==
Menon stood in his first Twenty20 International (T20I) match, between India and England, on 26 January 2017. He stood in his first One Day International (ODI) match between Afghanistan and Ireland on 15 March 2017.

He was one of the twelve on-field umpires for the 2018 ICC Women's World Twenty20. He was the on-field umpire for the 2019 Indian Premier League final along with Ian Gould.

Menon was one of the on-field umpires for the one-off Test match between Afghanistan and the West Indies in India in November 2019. He became the 62nd Indian to umpire at this level. In February 2020, the ICC named him as one of the umpires to officiate in matches during the 2020 ICC Women's T20 World Cup in Australia.

In June 2020, Menon was elevated to Elite Panel of ICC Umpires replacing England's Nigel Llong, becoming the third Indian umpire to make into the list.

Menon was praised by the cricket fraternity for his umpiring during England's tour of India in 2021. He officiated in the 2021 T20 Cricket World Cup. He later went to officiate the semi-final and the final. In October 2022, he was named as one of the sixteen match officials for the 2022 T20 CWC.

In September 2023, he was named as one of the sixteen match officials for 2023 Cricket World Cup, and became the youngest match official to officiate at the World Cup, at the age of 39. He officiated in 7 matches including a semi-final. He was one of the 20 umpires for the T20 Cricket World Cup in June 2024. He later went to officiate the semi-final as an on-field umpire. He was named by the ICC to officiate the WTC Final in 2025.

== See also ==
- List of Test cricket umpires
- List of One Day International cricket umpires
- List of Twenty20 International cricket umpires
