= Chettithody Shamshuddin =

Indian cricket umpire (born 1970)

Personal information
- Full name: Chettithody Shamshuddin
- Born: 22 March 1970 (age 56); Hyderabad, Telangana, India
- Role: Umpire

Umpiring information
- ODIs umpired: 43 (2013–2020)
- T20Is umpired: 20 (2012–2020)
- WODIs umpired: 3 (2010–2013)
- WT20Is umpired: 3 (2016)
- Source: ESPNcricinfo, 12 February 2020

Chettithody Shamshuddin (born 22 March 1970) is an Indian cricket umpire. He is a member of the Emirates International Panel of ICC Umpires in the on-field category and officiates in One Day Internationals (ODIs) and Twenty20 Internationals (T20Is).

== Umpiring career ==
Shamsuddin was appointed as the Indian representative to the International Panel of ICC Umpires in the third umpire category in 2013. As of February 2020, he had officiated in 43 ODIs and 20 T20I matches.

== See also ==
- List of One Day International cricket umpires
- List of Twenty20 International cricket umpires
