= C. K. Nandan =

Indian cricketer and umpire

Personal information
- Born: 14 October 1963 (age 63); Delhi, India
- Role: Wicket-keeper, Umpire

Domestic team information
- Years: Team
- 1983–1988: Karnataka

Umpiring information
- ODIs umpired: 7 (2016–2019)
- T20Is umpired: 18 (2015–2019)
- WODIs umpired: 4 (2003–2021)
- WT20Is umpired: 4 (2016–2021)

Career statistics
Competition	FC
Matches	3
Runs scored	43
Batting average	8.60
100s/50s	0/0
Top score	20
Catches/stumpings	4/2
- Source: Espncricinfo, 29 April 2021

Chanila Krishna Bhat Nandan (born 14 October 1963) is a cricket umpire and former cricketer from India. His playing career included three first-class matches for Karnataka, over a period from 1983 to 1988. He made his umpiring debut in 1999, and has since umpired in various Indian domestic competitions, including Ranji Trophy and Indian Premier League matches.

== Playing career ==
Born in Delhi, before making his first-class debut, Nandan played representative matches for Karnataka schools and under-22 teams, and also appeared in inter-university matches for Bangalore University. A wicket-keeper, he made his Ranji Trophy debut in December 1983, playing the first match of the season against Hyderabad before being dropped. On debut, he played solely as a batsman, with future Indian national team player Sadanand Viswanath keeping wicket. Nandan's next first-class appearance came late in the 1984–85 season, in his team's Ranji semi-final against Delhi. Both of Karnataka's first-choice wicket-keepers, Sadanand Viswanath and Syed Kirmani, were unavailable for the match. Nandan recorded four dismissals (three catches and a stumping) in Delhi's only innings, with Karnataka eliminated on its first innings total. His third and final Ranji appearance came in December 1988, when he played against Kerala, making 20 runs in the second innings (his highest first-class score).

== Umpiring career ==
Nandan made his Ranji Trophy debut as an umpire during the 1999–2000 season, umpiring two matches between Haryana and Jammu and Kashmir (one in the main tournament, and one in the one-day equivalent). In December 2003, he umpired a women's One Day International (ODI) between India and New Zealand, which was his maiden ODI. Beginning from the 2011–12 season, when the West Indies toured, Nandan has occasionally been a reserve umpire for India's home ODI series, and on one occasion for a home Test, when England toured during the 2012–13 season. At the 2014 Asia Cup in Bangladesh, he was the third umpire for four matches (including the final between Pakistan and Sri Lanka), his first series outside of India. Nandan made his IPL umpiring debut during the tournament's 2013 edition, and has since also umpired in the 2014 and 2015 editions of the tournament, as well as the 2014 Champions League. He was the fourth umpire for both the 2014 and 2015 IPL finals. He stood in his first Twenty20 International match on 5 October 2015, in the game between India and South Africa. He stood in his first One Day International match on 29 October 2016, in the game between India and New Zealand.

In January 2018, he was named as one of the seventeen on-field umpires for the 2018 Under-19 Cricket World Cup. He was eventually removed from the ICC International Panel for poor performance.

== See also ==
- List of One Day International cricket umpires
- List of Twenty20 International cricket umpires
