= 2018–19 Syed Mushtaq Ali Trophy Group B =

- Dates: 21 February – 2 March 2019
- Administrator(s): BCCI
- Cricket format: Twenty20 cricket
- Tournament format(s): Round-robin and Playoff format
- Participants: 8

The 2018–19 Syed Mushtaq Ali Trophy was the tenth season of the Syed Mushtaq Ali Trophy, a Twenty20 cricket tournament in India. It was contested by the 37 domestic cricket teams of India, with eight teams in Group B. The group stage started on 21 February 2019, with the top two teams progressing to the Super League section of the competition.

Vidarbha won the group, with Gujarat finishing second to progress to the Super League phase of the tournament.

== Points table ==
Team	Pld	W	L	T	NR	Pts	NRR
Vidarbha	6	5	1	0	0	20	+1.083
Gujarat (H)	6	4	2	0	0	16	+1.280
Himachal Pradesh	6	4	2	0	0	16	+0.705
Tamil Nadu	6	4	2	0	0	16	+0.397
Rajasthan	6	3	3	0	0	12	+0.758
Bihar	6	1	5	0	0	4	–1.877
Meghalaya	6	0	6	0	0	0	–2.311

- Top two teams advances to the Super League.

(H)- Host

== Fixtures ==
=== Round 1 ===
21 February 2019
Scorecard

Gujarat; 146/8 (20 overs)	v	Meghalaya; 133/8 (20 overs)
Axar Patel 48 (37); Abhay Negi 3/30 (4 overs)		Puneet Bisht 56 (34); Piyush Chawla 3/17 (4 overs)

Gujarat won by 13 runs
Lalabhai Contractor Stadium, Surat
Umpires: Nikhil Patwardhan and Somnath Jha

- Meghalaya won the toss and elected to field.
- Hemang Patel, Tejas Patel, Manish Sharma (Gujarat), Aditya Singhania, Jason Lamare, Neetesh Sharma, Wanlambok Nongkhlaw, Raj Biswa, Swarajeet Das and Akash Choudhary (Meghalaya) all made their T20 debuts.

21 February 2019
Scorecard

Rajasthan; 181/4 (20 overs)	v	Tamil Nadu; 128 (19.5 overs)
Mahipal Lomror 78* (52); Murugan Ashwin 2/33 (4 overs)		Shahrukh Khan 23 (19); Khaleel Ahmed 3/14 (3.5 overs)

Rajasthan won by 53 runs
CB Patel International Cricket Stadium, Surat
Umpires: Abhijit Bengeri and Virender Sharma

- Tamil Nadu won the toss and elected to field.
- Rajendran Vivek, Chezhian Harinishanth (Tamil Nadu) and Ravi Bishnoi (Rajasthan) all made their T20 debuts.

21 February 2019
Scorecard

Himachal Pradesh; 167/8 (20 overs)	v	Vidarbha; 171/7 (20 overs)
Ekant Sen 52 (39); Shrikant Wagh 3/32 (4 overs)		Atharva Taide 43 (16); Prashant Chopra 2/18 (3 overs)

Vidarbha won by 3 wickets
Lalabhai Contractor Stadium, Surat
Umpires: Nikhil Patwardhan and Somnath Jha

- Himachal Pradesh won the toss and elected to bat.
- Ekant Sen, Nitin Sharma, Ankit Maini, Ayush Jamwal (Himachal Pradesh), Atharva Taide, Darshan Nalkande and Yash Thakur (Vidarbha) all made their T20 debuts.

=== Round 2 ===
22 February 2019
Scorecard

Himachal Pradesh; 207/4 (20 overs)	v	Meghalaya; 142/6 (20 overs)
Ankush Bains 68 (36); Neetesh Sharma 1/17 (1 over)		Gurinder Singh 49* (34); Ankit Maini 3/24 (4 overs)

Himachal Pradesh won by 65 runs
CB Patel International Cricket Stadium, Surat
Umpires: Abhijit Bengeri and Somnath Jha

- Meghalaya won the toss and elected to field.
- Amiangshu Sen (Meghalaya) made his T20 debut.

22 February 2019
Scorecard

Bihar; 103/8 (20 overs)	v	Vidarbha; 104/3 (14.2 overs)
Babul Kumar 27 (31); Yash Thakur 2/12 (3 overs)		Shalabh Shrivastava 49* (38); Vivek Kumar 2/27 (4 overs)

Vidarbha won by 7 wickets
Lalabhai Contractor Stadium, Surat
Umpires: Nikhil Patwardhan and Virender Sharma

- Vidarbha won the toss and elected to field.
- Mangal Mahrour, Vijay Bharti, Babul Kumar, MD Rahmatullah, Asfan Khan, Ashutosh Aman, Vivek Kumar, Prashant Singh and Vishal Das (Bihar) all made their T20 debuts.

22 February 2019
Scorecard

Rajasthan; 143/7 (20 overs)	v	Gujarat; 143/7 (20 overs)
Manender Singh 48 (35); Tejas Patel 4/26 (4 overs)		Axar Patel 33 (25); Khaleel Ahmed 3/19 (4 overs)

Match tied
(Gujarat won the Super Over)
Lalabhai Contractor Stadium, Surat
Umpires: Nikhil Patwardhan and Virender Sharma

- Rajasthan won the toss and elected to bat.
- The scores were level after the Super Over. Gujarat won the match by scoring more boundaries during their innings.

=== Round 3 ===
24 February 2019
Scorecard

Bihar; 134/9 (20 overs)	v	Tamil Nadu; 132/4 (18.5 overs)
MD Rahmatullah 32 (18); M Mohammed 3/21 (4 overs)		Baba Indrajith 46 (47); Ashutosh Aman 2/19 (4 overs)

Tamil Nadu won by 6 wickets
CB Patel International Cricket Stadium, Surat
Umpires: Nikhil Patwardhan and Virender Sharma

- Bihar won the toss and elected to bat.
- NS Chaturved and Piyush Singh (Bihar) both made their T20 debuts.

24 February 2019
Scorecard

Gujarat; 167/5 (20 overs)	v	Himachal Pradesh; 97 (15.1 overs)
Dhruv Raval 71* (49); Mayank Dagar 1/20 (4 overs)		Prashant Chopra 35 (35); Hemang Patel 3/14 (3 overs)

Gujarat won by 70 runs
Lalabhai Contractor Stadium, Surat
Umpires: Abhijit Bengeri and Somnath Jha

- Himachal Pradesh won the toss and elected to field.
- Kavish Panchal (Gujarat) and KD Singh (Himachal Pradesh) both made their T20 debuts.

24 February 2019
Scorecard

Rajasthan; 136/5 (20 overs)	v	Meghalaya; 65 (16.1 overs)
Mahipal Lomror 47 (46); Abhay Negi 2/19 (3 overs)		Gurinder Singh 24 (31); Nathu Singh 3/7 (3 overs)

Rajasthan won by 72 runs
Lalabhai Contractor Stadium, Surat
Umpires: Abhijit Bengeri and Somnath Jha

- Rajasthan won the toss and elected to bat.

=== Round 4 ===
25 February 2019
Scorecard

Tamil Nadu; 125/6 (20 overs)	v	Gujarat; 124 (19.5 overs)
NS Chaturved 34 (38); Arzan Nagwaswalla 3/11 (4 overs)		Chirag Gandhi 68* (66); Washington Sundar 2/10 (3 overs)

Tamil Nadu won by 1 run
Lalabhai Contractor Stadium, Surat
Umpires: Abhijit Bengeri and Somnath Jha

- Gujarat won the toss and elected to field.
- Arzan Nagwaswalla (Gujarat) made his T20 debut.

25 February 2019
Scorecard

Vidarbha; 117 (16.5 overs)	v	Rajasthan; 73 (16.5 overs)
Jitesh Sharma 49 (29); Khaleel Ahmed 5/18 (2.5 overs)		Manender Singh 24 (22); Akshay Karnewar 4/7 (3.5 overs)

Vidarbha won by 44 runs
CB Patel International Cricket Stadium, Surat
Umpires: Nikhil Patwardhan and Virender Sharma

- Vidarbha won the toss and elected to bat.

25 February 2019
Scorecard

Bihar; 78 (18.5 overs)	v	Himachal Pradesh; 81/1 (10.3 overs)
Asfan Khan 25 (24); Gurvinder Singh 2/11 (3 overs)		Ankush Bains 54* (40); Samar Quadri 1/14 (2.3 overs)

Himachal Pradesh won by 9 wickets
Lalabhai Contractor Stadium, Surat
Umpires: Abhijit Bengeri and Somnath Jha

- Bihar won the toss and elected to bat.

=== Round 5 ===
27 February 2019
Scorecard

Vidarbha; 161/6 (20 overs)	v	Meghalaya; 129/4 (20 overs)
Shalabh Shrivastava 56 (43); Raj Biswa 2/26 (4 overs)		Gurinder Singh 56* (37); Yash Thakur 2/27 (3 overs)

Vidarbha won by 32 runs
Lalabhai Contractor Stadium, Surat
Umpires: Abhijit Bengeri and Virender Sharma

- Meghalaya won the toss and elected to field.
- Larry Sangma (Meghalaya) and Rushabh Rathod (Vidarbha) both made their T20 debuts.

27 February 2019
Scorecard

Tamil Nadu; 138/9 (20 overs)	v	Himachal Pradesh; 139/3 (19 overs)
Murali Vijay 77 (58); Ankit Maini 3/29 (4 overs)		Prashant Chopra 68* (53); Abhishek Tanwar 2/14 (3 overs)

Himachal Pradesh won by 7 wickets
Pithwala Stadium, Surat
Umpires: Nikhil Patwardhan and Somnath Jha

- Tamil Nadu won the toss and elected to bat.

27 February 2019
Scorecard

Gujarat; 199/4 (20 overs)	v	Bihar; 116/7 (20 overs)
Priyank Kirit Panchal 78 (46); Vishal Das 2/40 (4 overs)		Keshav Kumar 61* (62); Arzan Nagwaswalla 4/25 (4 overs)

Gujarat won by 43 runs
Lalabhai Contractor Stadium, Surat
Umpires: Abhijit Bengeri and Virender Sharma

- Gujarat won the toss and elected to bat.
- Piyush Tanwar (Gujarat) made his T20 debut.

=== Round 6 ===
28 February 2019
Scorecard

Meghalaya; 124/8 (20 overs)	v	Bihar; 126/9 (19.5 overs)
Gurinder Singh 39* (37); Ashutosh Aman 4/15 (4 overs)		Keshav Kumar 43 (40); Amiangshu Sen 1/13 (4 overs)

Bihar won by 1 wicket
Pithwala Stadium, Surat
Umpires: Abhijit Bengeri and Virender Sharma

- Meghalaya won the toss and elected to bat.
- Rajesh Tati (Meghalaya) and Puneet Malik (Bihar) both made their T20 debuts.

28 February 2019
Scorecard

Himachal Pradesh; 150/5 (20 overs)	v	Rajasthan; 141/7 (20 overs)
Ankush Bains 55 (47); Rahul Chahar 2/21 (3 overs)		Chetan Bist 34 (23); Ankit Maini 3/29 (4 overs)

Himachal Pradesh won by 9 runs
Lalabhai Contractor Stadium, Surat
Umpires: Nikhil Patwardhan and Somnath Jha

- Himachal Pradesh won the toss and elected to bat.

28 February 2019
Scorecard

Vidarbha; 141/9 (20 overs)	v	Tamil Nadu; 142/7 (19.2 overs)
Rushabh Rathod 51 (31); Abhishek Tanwar 3/22 (4 overs)		Murali Vijay 74 (47); Shrikant Wagh 2/23 (4 overs)

Tamil Nadu won by 3 wickets
Lalabhai Contractor Stadium, Surat
Umpires: Nikhil Patwardhan and Somnath Jha

- Tamil Nadu won the toss and elected to field.

=== Round 7 ===
2 March 2019
Scorecard

Rajasthan; 129/8 (20 overs)	v	Bihar; 110/8 (20 overs)
Robin Bist 34 (28); Prashant Singh 3/23 (3 overs)		Mangal Mahrour 33 (32); Aniket Choudhary 3/16 (4 overs)

Rajasthan won by 19 runs
Lalabhai Contractor Stadium, Surat
Umpires: Somnath Jha and Virender Sharma

- Rajasthan won the toss and elected to bat.
- Siddharth Saraf and Ramnivas Golada (Rajasthan) both made their T20 debuts.

2 March 2019
Scorecard

Gujarat; 121/6 (20 overs)	v	Vidarbha; 122/5 (18.2 overs)
Priyank Kirit Panchal 38 (34); Atharva Taide 2/16 (4 overs)		Faiz Fazal 39* (39); Manish Sharma 2/25 (4 overs)

Vidarbha won by 5 wickets
Pithwala Stadium, Surat
Umpires: Abhijit Bengeri and Nikhil Patwardhan

- Gujarat won the toss and elected to bat.

2 March 2019
Scorecard

Tamil Nadu; 213/2 (20 overs)	v	Meghalaya; 121/4 (20 overs)
Murali Vijay 107 (67); Akash Choudhary 2/39 (4 overs)		Gurinder Singh 38* (30); Murugan Ashwin 2/16 (4 overs)

Tamil Nadu won by 92 runs
Lalabhai Contractor Stadium, Surat
Umpires: Somnath Jha and Virender Sharma

- Tamil Nadu won the toss and elected to bat.
- Laxman Chetri and Lakhan Singh (Meghalaya) both made their T20 debuts.
