= 2019 Delhi Capitals season =

Twenty20 franchise cricket team based in Delhi, India

Delhi Capitals
2019 season
- Coach: Ricky Ponting
- Captain: Shreyas Iyer
- Ground(s): Feroz Shah Kotla Ground, Delhi
- 2019 Indian Premier League: 3rd
- Most runs: Shikhar Dhawan (521)
- Most wickets: Kagiso Rabada (25)

Delhi Capitals are a Twenty20 franchise cricket team based in Delhi, India. The team plays in the Indian Premier League and competed in the 2019 edition of the competition between March and May 2019. In December 2018, the team changed its name from the Delhi Daredevils. The Capitals started their campaign with a 37 run victory over three-time champions Mumbai. The Capitals finally entered the playoffs after 7 years, and they won their first-ever playoffs match. The Capitals ended up as 2nd runners-up in the playoffs.

== Background ==
=== Player retention and auction ===
In November 2018, the team retained 14 players from their 2018 squad: Shreyas Iyer, Rishabh Pant, Prithvi Shaw, Amit Mishra, Avesh Khan, Harshal Patel, Rahul Tewatia, Jayant Yadav, Manjot Kalra, Colin Munro, Chris Morris, Kagiso Rabada, Sandeep Lamichhane and Trent Boult. In addition they acquired Shikhar Dhawan in a trade from Sunrisers Hyderabad, trading Vijay Shankar, Abhishek Sharma and Shahbaz Nadeem for Dhawan.

In the 2019 player auction in December, they purchased 10 new players: Colin Ingram, Axar Patel, Hanuma Vihari, Sherfane Rutherford, Ishant Sharma, Keemo Paul, Jalaj Saxena, Ankush Bains, Nathu Singh and Bandaru Ayyappa.

=== Transfers ===
Shikhar Dhawan was acquired from Sunrisers Hyderabad with Vijay Shankar, Shahbaz Nadeem and Abhishek Sharma moving from Delhi in return.

== Squad ==
The following players were retained:

- Shreyas Iyer (captain)
- Rishabh Pant (vice-captain)
- Prithvi Shaw
- Shikhar Dhawan
- Amit Mishra
- Avesh Khan
- Harshal Patel
- Rahul Tewatia
- Jayant Yadav
- Manjot Kalra
- Colin Munro
- Chris Morris
- Kagiso Rabada
- Sandeep Lamichhane
- Trent Boult

The franchise then added the following players:

- Colin Ingram
- Axar Patel
- Hanuma Vihari
- Sherfane Rutherford
- Ishant Sharma
- Keemo Paul
- Jalaj Saxena
- Ankush Bains
- Nathu Singh
- Bandaru Ayyappa

== Coaching and support staff ==
- Head coach – Ricky Ponting
- Assistant coach – Mohammad Kaif
- Fast bowling coach – James Hopes
- Spin bowling coach – Samuel Badree
- Physiotherapist – Sumeshen Moodley

== Season ==
=== League table ===
Pos	Team	Pld	W	L	NR	Pts	NRR	
1	Mumbai Indians (C)	14	9	5	0	18	0.421	Advanced to Qualifier 1
2	Chennai Super Kings (R)	14	9	5	0	18	0.131	Advanced to Qualifier 1
3	Delhi Capitals	14	9	5	0	18	0.044	Advanced to the Eliminator
4	Sunrisers Hyderabad	14	6	8	0	12	0.577	Advanced to the Eliminator
5	Kolkata Knight Riders	14	6	8	0	12	0.028	
6	Kings XI Punjab	14	6	8	0	12	−0.251	
7	Rajasthan Royals	14	5	8	1	11	−0.449	
8	Royal Challengers Bangalore	14	5	8	1	11	−0.607	

Source: ESPNCricinfo
The four top ranked teams qualify for the playoffs

=== Results by match ===
Round	1	2	3	4	5	6	7	8	9	10	11	12	13	14
Ground	A	H	H	A	H	A	A	A	H	H	A	H	A	H
Result	W	L	W	L	L	W	W	W	L	W	W	W	L	W
Position	2	2	4	6	6	5	4	2	4	3	1	1	2	2

Source: Fixtures
A = Away; H = Home; W = Win; D = Draw; L = Loss

=== Fixtures ===
==== League stage ====
24 March
20:00 (D/N)
Scorecard

Delhi Capitals; 213/6 (20 overs)	v	Mumbai Indians (H); 176 (19.2 overs)
Rishabh Pant 78* (27); Mitchell McClenaghan 3/40 (4 overs)		Yuvraj Singh 53 (35); Kagiso Rabada 2/23 (4 overs)

Delhi won by 37 runs
Wankhede Stadium, Mumbai
Umpires: Yeshwant Barde (Ind) and Sundaram Ravi (Ind)
Player of the match: Rishabh Pant (Delhi Capitals)

- Mumbai Indians won the toss and elected to field.

26 March
20:00 (D/N)
Scorecard

(H) Delhi Capitals; 147/6 (20 overs)	v	Chennai Super Kings; 150/4 (19.4 overs)
Shikhar Dhawan 51 (47); Dwayne Bravo 3/33 (4 overs)		Shane Watson 44 (26); Amit Mishra 2/35 (4 overs)

Chennai won by 6 wickets
Feroz Shah Kotla Ground, Delhi
Umpires: Marais Erasmus (SA) and Nitin Menon (Ind)
Player of the match: Shane Watson (Chennai Super Kings)

- Delhi Capitals won the toss and elected to bat.

30 March
20:00 (D/N)
Scorecard

Kolkata Knight Riders; 185/8 (20 overs)	v	Delhi Capitals (H); 185/6 (20 overs)
Andre Russell 62 (28); Harshal Patel 2/40 (4 overs)		Prithvi Shaw 99 (55); Kuldeep Yadav 2/41 (4 overs)

Match tied (Delhi won the Super Over)
Feroz Shah Kotla Ground, Delhi
Umpires: Anil Dandekar (Ind) and Nitin Menon (Ind)
Player of the match: Prithvi Shaw (Delhi Capitals)

- Delhi Capitals won the toss and elected to field.

1 April
20:00 (D/N)
Scorecard

(H) Kings XI Punjab; 166/9 (20 overs)	v	Delhi Capitals; 152 (19.2 overs)
David Miller 43 (30); Chris Morris 3/30 (4 overs)		Rishabh Pant 39 (26); Sam Curran 4/11 (2.2 overs)

Punjab won by 14 runs
Punjab Cricket Association IS Bindra Stadium, Mohali
Umpires: Anil Chaudhary (Ind) and Chris Gaffaney (NZ)
Player of the match: Sam Curran (Kings XI Punjab)

- Delhi Capitals won the toss and elected to field.
- Sam Curran (Kings XI Punjab) took a hat-trick.

4 April
20:00 (D/N)
Scorecard

(H) Delhi Capitals; 129/8 (20 overs)	v	Sunrisers Hyderabad; 131/5 (18.3 overs)
Shreyas Iyer 43 (41); Mohammad Nabi 2/21 (4 overs)		Jonny Bairstow 48 (28); Ishant Sharma 1/5 (1 over)

Hyderabad won by 5 wickets
Feroz Shah Kotla Ground, Delhi
Umpires: K. N. Ananthapadmanabhan (Ind) and Chettithody Shamshuddin (Ind)
Player of the match: Jonny Bairstow (Sunrisers Hyderabad)

- Sunrisers Hyderabad won the toss and elected to field.

7 April
16:00 (D/N)
Scorecard

(H) Royal Challengers Bangalore; 149/8 (20 overs)	v	Delhi Capitals; 152/6 (18.5 overs)
Virat Kohli 41 (33); Kagiso Rabada 4/21 (4 overs)		Shreyas Iyer 67 (50); Navdeep Saini 2/24 (4 overs)

Delhi won by 4 wickets
M. Chinnaswamy Stadium, Bengaluru
Umpires: Yeshwant Barde (Ind) and Sundaram Ravi (Ind)
Player of the match: Kagiso Rabada (Delhi Capitals)

- Delhi Capitals won the toss and elected to field.

12 April
20:00 (D/N)
Scorecard

(H) Kolkata Knight Riders; 178/7 (20 overs)	v	Delhi Capitals; 180/3 (18.5 overs)
Shubman Gill 65 (39); Chris Morris 2/38 (4 overs)		Shikhar Dhawan 97* (63); Nitish Rana 1/12 (2 overs)

Delhi won by 7 wickets
Eden Gardens, Kolkata
Umpires: Yeshwant Barde (Ind) and C. K. Nandan (Ind)
Player of the match: Shikhar Dhawan (Delhi Capitals)

- Delhi Capitals won the toss and elected to field.

14 April
20:00 (D/N)
Scorecard

Delhi Capitals; 155/7 (20 overs)	v	Sunrisers Hyderabad (H); 116 (18.5 overs)
Shreyas Iyer 45 (40); Khaleel Ahmed 3/30 (4 overs)		David Warner 51 (47); Kagiso Rabada 4/22 (3.5 overs)

Delhi won by 39 runs
Rajiv Gandhi International Cricket Stadium, Hyderabad
Umpires: Anil Chaudhary (Ind) and Bruce Oxenford (Aus)
Player of the match: Keemo Paul (Delhi Capitals)

- Sunrisers Hyderabad won the toss and elected to field. Sunrisers Hyderabad played their 100th IPL match.
- Bhuvneshwar Kumar took his 100th wicket in the IPL and became the first bowler to take 100 wickets for the Sunrisers Hyderabad.

18 April
20:00 (D/N)
Scorecard

Mumbai Indians; 168/5 (20 overs)	v	Delhi Capitals (H); 128/9 (20 overs)
Krunal Pandya 37* (26); Kagiso Rabada 2/38 (4 overs)		Shikhar Dhawan 35 (22); Rahul Chahar 3/19 (4 overs)

Mumbai won by 40 runs
Feroz Shah Kotla Ground, Delhi
Umpires: Nigel Llong (Eng) and Bruce Oxenford (Aus)
Player of the match: Hardik Pandya (Mumbai Indians)

- Mumbai Indians won the toss and elected to bat.

20 April
20:00 (D/N)
Scorecard

Kings XI Punjab; 163/7 (20 overs)	v	Delhi Capitals (H); 166/5 (19.4 overs)
Chris Gayle 69 (37); Sandeep Lamichhane 3/40 (4 overs)		Shreyas Iyer 58* (49); Hardus Viljoen 2/39 (4 overs)

Delhi won by 5 wickets
Feroz Shah Kotla Ground, Delhi
Umpires: Ulhas Gandhe (Ind) and Chettithody Shamshuddin (Ind)
Player of the match: Shreyas Iyer (Delhi Capitals)

- Delhi Capitals won the toss and elected to field.
- Harpreet Brar (Kings XI Punjab) made his T20 debut.

22 April
20:00 (D/N)
Scorecard

(H) Rajasthan Royals; 191/6 (20 overs)	v	Delhi Capitals; 193/4 (19.2 overs)
Ajinkya Rahane 105* (63); Kagiso Rabada 2/37 (4 overs)		Rishabh Pant 78* (36); Shreyas Gopal 2/47 (4 overs)

Delhi won by 6 wickets
Sawai Mansingh Stadium, Jaipur
Umpires: Nand Kishore (Ind) and Sundaram Ravi (Ind)
Player of the match: Rishabh Pant (Delhi Capitals)

- Delhi Capitals won the toss and elected to field.
- Ashton Turner (Rajasthan Royals) became the first batsman to make five consecutive ducks in Twenty20 cricket.

28 April
16:00 (D/N)
Scorecard

(H) Delhi Capitals; 187/5 (20 overs)	v	Royal Challengers Bangalore; 171/7 (20 overs)
Shreyas Iyer 52 (37); Yuzvendra Chahal 2/41 (4 overs)		Parthiv Patel 39 (20); Amit Mishra 2/29 (4 overs)

Delhi won by 16 runs
Feroz Shah Kotla Ground, Delhi
Umpires: K. N. Ananthapadmanabhan (Ind) and Bruce Oxenford (Aus)
Player of the match: Shikhar Dhawan (Delhi Capitals)

- Delhi Capitals won the toss and elected to bat.
- Delhi Capitals qualified for the playoffs as a result of this match.

1 May
20:00 (D/N)
Scorecard

(H) Chennai Super Kings; 179/4 (20 overs)	v	Delhi Capitals; 99 (16.2 overs)
Suresh Raina 59 (37); Jagadeesha Suchith 2/28 (4 overs)		Shreyas Iyer 44 (31); Imran Tahir 4/12 (3.2 overs)

Chennai won by 80 runs
M. A. Chidambaram Stadium, Chennai
Umpires: Anil Dandekar (Ind) and Nitin Menon (Ind)
Player of the match: MS Dhoni (Chennai Super Kings)

- Delhi Capitals won the toss and elected to field.

4 May
16:00 (D/N)
Scorecard

Rajasthan Royals; 115/9 (20 overs)	v	Delhi Capitals (H); 121/5 (16.1 overs)
Riyan Parag 50 (49); Amit Mishra 3/17 (4 overs)		Rishabh Pant 53* (38); Ish Sodhi 3/26 (3.1 overs)

Delhi won by 5 wickets
Feroz Shah Kotla, Delhi
Umpires: Anil Dandekar (Ind) and Ian Gould (Eng)
Player of the match: Amit Mishra (Delhi Capitals)

- Rajasthan Royals won the toss and elected to bat.
- Rajasthan Royals were eliminated as a result of this match.

== Playoffs ==
Eliminator

8 May
19:30 (D/N)
Scorecard

Sunrisers Hyderabad; 162/8 (20 overs)	v	Delhi Capitals; 165/8 (19.5 overs)
Martin Guptill 36 (19); Keemo Paul 3/32 (4 overs)		Prithvi Shaw 56 (38); Rashid Khan 2/15 (4 overs)

Delhi won by 2 wickets
Dr. Y. S. Rajasekhara Reddy ACA–VDCA Cricket Stadium, Visakhapatnam
Umpires: Bruce Oxenford (Aus) and Sundaram Ravi (Ind)
Player of the match: Rishabh Pant (Delhi Capitals)

- Delhi Capitals won the toss and elected to field.

Qualifier 2

10 May
19:30 (D/N)
Scorecard

Delhi Capitals; 147/9 (20 overs)	v	Chennai Super Kings; 151/4 (19 overs)
Rishabh Pant 38 (25); Dwayne Bravo 2/19 (4 overs)		Shane Watson 50 (32); Trent Boult 1/20 (4 overs)

Chennai won by 6 wickets
Dr. Y. S. Rajasekhara Reddy ACA–VDCA Cricket Stadium, Visakhapatnam
Umpires: Bruce Oxenford (Aus) and Sundaram Ravi (Ind)
Player of the match: Faf du Plessis (Chennai Super Kings)

- Chennai Super Kings won the toss and elected to field.

== Statistics ==
=== Most runs ===
No.	Name	Matches	Inns	NO	Runs	HS	Ave.	BF	SR	100s	50s
1	Shikhar Dhawan	16	16	1	521	97*	34.73	384	135.94	0	5
2	Rishabh Pant	16	15	3	488	78*	37.53	300	162.66	0	3
3	Shreyas Iyer	16	16	1	463	78*	30.86	386	119.94	0	3
4	Prithvi Shaw	16	15	0	353	99	22.06	264	133.71	0	2
5	Colin Ingram	12	12	2	184	47	18.40	154	119.41	0	0

- Source:Cricinfo

=== Most wickets ===
No.	Name	Matches	Inns	Overs	Maidens	Runs	Wickets	BBI	Ave.	Econ.	SR	4W	5W
1	Kagiso Rabada	12	12	47.0	0	368	25	4/21	14.72	7.82	11.2	2	0
2	Chris Morris	9	9	33.0	0	306	13	3/22	23.53	9.27	15.2	0	0
3	Ishant Sharma	12	12	42.0	1	325	12	3/38	27.08	7.73	21.0	0	0
4	Amit Mishra	9	9	36.0	0	249	10	3/17	24.90	6.91	21.6	0	0
5	Axar Patel	12	12	47.0	0	332	9	3/22	36.88	7.06	31.3	0	0

- Source:Cricinfo

== Awards and achievements ==
The following players won player of the match awards during the season:

No.	Date	Player	Opponent	Result	Contribution	Ref.
1	24 March 2019	Rishabh Pant	Mumbai Indians	Won by 37 runs	78* runs in 27 balls	
2	30 March 2019	Prithvi Shaw	Kolkata Knight Riders	Delhi won the Super over	99 runs in 55 balls	
3	7 April 2019	Kagiso Rabada	Royal Challengers Bangalore	Delhi won by 4 Wickets	4/21 (4 overs)	
4	12 April 2019	Shikhar Dhawan	Kolkata Knight Riders	Delhi won by 7 Wickets	97* runs in 63 balls	
5	14 April 2019	Keemo Paul	Sunrisers Hyderabad	Delhi won by 39 runs	3/17 (4 overs)	
6	20 April 2019	Shreyas Iyer	Kings XI Punjab	Delhi won by 5 wickets	58* runs in 49 bals	
7	22 April 2019	Rishabh Pant	Rajasthan Royals	Delhi won by 6 wickets	78* runs in 36 bals	
8	28 April 2019	Shikhar Dhawan	Royal Challengers Bangalore	Delhi won by 16 runs	50 runs in 37 bals	
9	4 May 2019	Amit Mishra	Rajasthan Royals	Delhi won by 5 wickets	3/17 (4 overs)	
10	8 May 2019	Rishabh Pant	Sunrisers Hyderabad	Delhi won by 2 wickets	49 runs in 21 balls	
