= Chettri =

Chhetri (Nepali: क्षेत्री) is a Nepali surname. Spellings include Chetri, Chhetri and Chhetry. Notable people with the surname include:

== Chetri ==
- Hem Chetri (born 2000), Indian cricketer
- Laxman Chetri (born 1996), Indian cricketer
- Mani Kumar Chetri (1920–2026), Indian cardiologist
- Rewati Chetri (born 1993), Indian model and beauty pageant winner

== Chettri ==
- Bipul Chettri, Indian singer
- Bir Bahadur Chettri (born 1955), Indian Olympic hockey player
- Bharat Chettri (born 1982), Indian field hockey player
- Laxman Chettri (born 1992), Indian cricketer
- Lil Bahadur Chettri, Indian writer
- Nirmal Chettri (born 1990), Indian footballer
- Ram Bahadur Chettri (1937–2000), Indian footballer
- Rohit John Chettri (born 1991), Nepali singer, musician, music producer and lyricist
- Sabin Chettri (born 1994), Indian cricketer

== Chhetri ==
- Ajay Chhetri (born 1999), Indian footballer
- Bijay Chhetri (born 2001), Indian footballer
- Bikash Singh Chhetri (born 1992), Nepalese footballer
- Dinesh Chhetri, Bhutanese footballer active in 2002
- Jit Bahadur Khatri Chhetri (born 1947), Nepalese Olympic long-distance runner
- Krishna Bahadur Chhetri (born 1935), Indian politician
- Mahesh Chhetri (born 1988), Nepalese cricketer
- Nanda Lal Roka Chhetri, Nepalese politician
- Raj Bahadur Buda Chhetri, Nepalese politician
- Rajendra Chhetri (born 1960), Nepalese army officer, Chief of Army Staff 2015–2018
- Sanjog Chhetri (1982–2003), Indian paratrooper
- Shailesh Thapa Chhetri (born 1968), Inspector General of Nepal Police
- Shanta Chhetri, Indian politician
- Sunil Chhetri (born 1984), Indian football team captain and prolific goalscorer
- Sushil Chhetri, Nepalese actor
- Til Bahadur Mahat Chhetri, Nepalese politician
- Vinod Singh Chhetri (1935–2019), Nepalese geologist
- Yagya Bahadur Budha Chhetri, Nepalese politician

== Chhetry ==
- Rubina Chhetry (born 1993), Nepali cricketer
