= 2019 Mumbai Indians season =

Indian Premier League cricket team season

Mumbai Indians
2019 season
- Coach: Mahela Jayawardene
- Captain: Rohit Sharma; Kieron Pollard (1 match)
- Ground(s): Wankhede Stadium, Mumbai
- IPL: Champions
- Most runs: Quinton de Kock (521)
- Most wickets: Jasprit Bumrah (19)

The 2019 season was the 12th season for the Indian Premier League franchise Mumbai Indians. They were one of the eight teams competing in the 2019 Indian Premier League. Mumbai Indians defeated the Chennai Super Kings by 1 run to win the final for their fourth title.

== Background ==
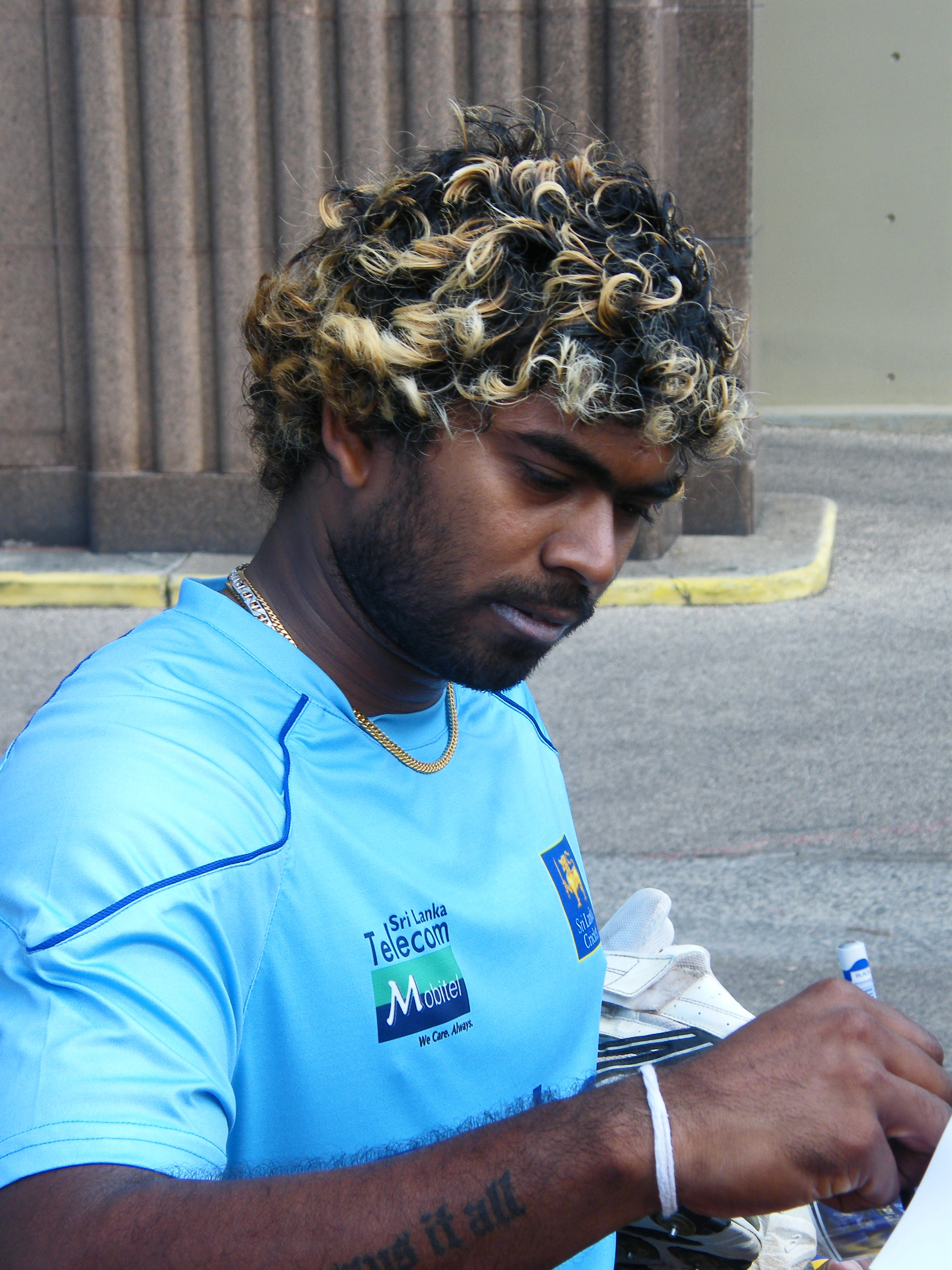
Malinga returned to the team as a player after working as the team's bowling mentor in the previous season.

=== Player retention, transfers and auction ===
In November 2018, Mumbai Indians announced their list of retained players for the 2019 season. The list included Rohit Sharma, Hardik Pandya, Jasprit Bumrah, Krunal Pandya, Ishan Kishan, Suryakumar Yadav, Mayank Markande, Rahul Chahar, Anukul Roy, Siddhesh Lad, Aditya Tare, Quinton de Kock, Evin Lewis, Kieron Pollard, Ben Cutting, Mitchell McClenaghan, Adam Milne and Jason Behrendorff.

=== Preseason ===
In February 2019, Netflix released an eight-part documentary series based on Mumbai Indians' 2018 season called Cricket Fever: Mumbai Indians.

On 1 March 2019, Colors was signed up as the team's principal sponsor for the season.

=== Team analysis ===
ESPNcricinfo's Vishal Dikshit opined that Mumbai's strength is their batting lineup "which has become even stronger" with the addition of Quinton de Kock while calling lack of depth in the spin department as their "biggest concern". Cricbuzz, however, stated that "the firepower the bowling department" is their strength and the uncertainty over Rohit Sharma's position in the batting order as "one of the biggest headaches." According to NDTV, "The perfect mixture of experience and young talent make Mumbai Indians one of the favourites to lift the trophy once more." News18 wrote "Mumbai's USP is their Indian contingent", while the Indian Express suggested that Jasprit Bumrah and Hardik Pandya could be rested during the latter stages of the season ahead of the World Cup.

== Squad ==
- Players with international caps are listed in **bold**.

No.	Name	Nationality	Birth date	Batting style	Bowling style	Year signed	Salary	Notes
Batsmen
17	**Evin Lewis**	Trinidad and Tobago	27 December 1991 (aged 27)	Left-handed	Right-arm medium	2018	₹3.8 crore (US$395,000)	Overseas
23	Siddhesh Lad	India	23 May 1992 (aged 26)	Right-handed	Right-arm off break	2018	₹20 lakh (US$21,000)	
28	Anmolpreet Singh	India	28 March 1998 (aged 20)	Right-handed	Right-arm off break	2019	₹80 lakh (US$83,000)	
45	**Rohit Sharma**	India	30 April 1987 (aged 31)	Right-handed	Right-arm off break	2018	₹15 crore (US$1.6 million)	Captain
77	Suryakumar Yadav	India	14 September 1990 (aged 28)	Right-handed	Right-arm medium	2018	₹3.2 crore (US$332,000)	
All-rounders
6	Anukul Roy	India	30 November 1998 (aged 20)	Left-handed	Slow left-arm orthodox	2018	₹20 lakh (US$21,000)	
12	**Yuvraj Singh**	India	12 December 1981 (aged 37)	Left-handed	Slow left-arm orthodox	2019	₹1 crore (US$104,000)	
19	**Jayant Yadav**	India	22 January 1990 (aged 29)	Right-handed	Right-arm off break	2019	₹50 lakh (US$52,000)	
24	**Krunal Pandya**	India	24 March 1991 (aged 27)	Left-handed	Slow left-arm orthodox	2018	₹8.8 crore (US$913,814.00)	
31	**Ben Cutting**	Australia	30 January 1987 (aged 32)	Right-handed	Right-arm medium	2018	₹2.2 crore (US$228,000)	Overseas
33	**Hardik Pandya**	India	11 October 1993 (aged 25)	Right-handed	Right-arm medium-fast	2018	₹11 crore (US$1.1 million)	
55	**Kieron Pollard**	Trinidad and Tobago	12 May 1987 (aged 31)	Right-handed	Right-arm medium-fast	2018	₹5.4 crore (US$561,000)	Vice-Captain; Overseas
Wicket-keepers
13	**Quinton de Kock**	South Africa	17 December 1992 (aged 26)	Left-handed		2019	₹2.8 crore (US$291,000)	Overseas
27	Aditya Tare	India	7 November 1987 (aged 31)	Right-handed		2018	₹20 lakh (US$21,000)	
51	Ishan Kishan	India	18 July 1998 (aged 20)	Left-handed	Left-arm medium	2018	₹6.2 crore (US$644,000)	
Bowlers
1	Rahul Chahar	India	4 August 1999 (aged 19)	Right-handed	Right-arm leg break	2018	₹1.9 crore (US$197,000)	
4	Rasikh Salam	India	5 April 2001 (aged 17)	Right-handed	Right-arm fast-medium	2019	₹20 lakh (US$21,000)	
5	**Jason Behrendorff**	Australia	20 April 1990 (aged 28)	Right-handed	Left-arm fast-medium	2018	₹1.5 crore (US$156,000)	Overseas
8	**Alzarri Joseph**	Antigua and Barbuda	20 November 1996 (aged 22)	Right-handed	Right-arm fast-medium	2019	₹75 lakh (US$78,000)	Overseas
9	**Barinder Sran**	India	10 December 1992 (aged 26)	Left-handed	Left-arm fast-medium	2019	₹3.4 crore (US$353,000)	
11	**Mayank Markande**	India	11 November 1997 (aged 21)	Right-handed	Right-arm leg break	2018	₹20 lakh (US$21,000)	
81	**Mitchell McClenaghan**	New Zealand	11 June 1986 (aged 32)	Left-handed	Left-arm fast-medium	2018	₹1 crore (US$104,000)	Overseas
93	**Jasprit Bumrah**	India	6 December 1993 (aged 25)	Right-handed	Right-arm fast-medium	2018	₹7 crore (US$727,000)	
99	**Lasith Malinga**	Sri Lanka	27 August 1983 (aged 35)	Right-handed	Right-arm fast	2019	₹2 crore (US$208,000)	Overseas
—N/a	**Adam Milne**	New Zealand	13 April 1992 (aged 26)	Right-handed	Right-arm fast-medium	2018	₹75 lakh (US$78,000)	Overseas
—N/a	Pankaj Jaiswal	India	20 September 1995 (aged 23)	Right-handed	Right-arm medium-fast	2019	₹20 lakh (US$21,000)	
—N/a	**Beuran Hendricks**	South Africa	8 July 1990 (aged 28)	Left-handed	Left-arm fast-medium	2019	₹75 lakh (US$78,000)	Overseas

== Coaching and support staff ==
- Head coach – Mahela Jayawardene
- Batting coach – Robin Singh
- Bowling coach - Shane Bond
- Fielding coach – James Pamment
- Mentor - Sachin Tendulkar
- Team manager - Rahul Sanghvi
- Director of cricket operations - Zaheer Khan

Ref

== Season ==
=== League table ===
Pos	Team	Pld	W	L	NR	Pts	NRR	
1	Mumbai Indians (C)	14	9	5	0	18	0.421	Advanced to Qualifier 1
2	Chennai Super Kings (R)	14	9	5	0	18	0.131	Advanced to Qualifier 1
3	Delhi Capitals	14	9	5	0	18	0.044	Advanced to the Eliminator
4	Sunrisers Hyderabad	14	6	8	0	12	0.577	Advanced to the Eliminator
5	Kolkata Knight Riders	14	6	8	0	12	0.028	
6	Kings XI Punjab	14	6	8	0	12	−0.251	
7	Rajasthan Royals	14	5	8	1	11	−0.449	
8	Royal Challengers Bangalore	14	5	8	1	11	−0.607	

Source: ESPNCricinfo
The four top ranked teams qualify for the playoffs

=== Results ===
==== League matches ====
24 March
20:00 (D/N)
Scorecard

Delhi Capitals; 213/6 (20 overs)	v	Mumbai Indians (H); 176 (19.2 overs)
Rishabh Pant 78* (27); Mitchell McClenaghan 3/40 (4 overs)		Yuvraj Singh 53 (35); Kagiso Rabada 2/23 (4 overs)

Delhi won by 37 runs
Wankhede Stadium, Mumbai
Umpires: Yeshwant Barde (Ind) and Sundaram Ravi (Ind)
Player of the match: Rishabh Pant (Delhi Capitals)

- Mumbai Indians won the toss and elected to field.

28 March
20:00 (D/N)
Scorecard

Mumbai Indians; 187/8 (20 overs)	v	Royal Challengers Bangalore (H); 181/5 (20 overs)
Rohit Sharma 48 (33); Yuzvendra Chahal 4/38 (4 overs)		AB de Villiers 70* (41); Jasprit Bumrah 3/20 (4 overs)

Mumbai won by 6 runs
M. Chinnaswamy Stadium, Bengaluru
Umpires: C. K. Nandan (Ind) and Sundaram Ravi (Ind)
Player of the match: Jasprit Bumrah (Mumbai Indians)

- Royal Challengers Bangalore won the toss and elected to field.
- Virat Kohli (Royal Challengers Bangalore) became the second batsman to score 5,000 runs in the IPL.

30 March
16:00 (D/N)
Scorecard

Mumbai Indians; 176/7 (20 overs)	v	Kings XI Punjab (H); 177/2 (18.4 overs)
Quinton de Kock 60 (39); Murugan Ashwin 2/25 (4 overs)		K. L. Rahul 71* (57); Krunal Pandya 2/43 (4 overs)

Punjab won by 8 wickets
Punjab Cricket Association IS Bindra Stadium, Mohali
Umpires: Chris Gaffaney (NZ) and Vineet Kulkarni (Ind)
Player of the match: Mayank Agarwal (Kings XI Punjab)

- Kings XI Punjab won the toss and elected to field.

3 April
20:00 (D/N)
Scorecard

(H) Mumbai Indians; 170/5 (20 overs)	v	Chennai Super Kings; 133/8 (20 overs)
Suryakumar Yadav 59 (43); Ravindra Jadeja 1/10 (2 overs)		Kedar Jadhav 58 (54); Hardik Pandya 3/20 (4 overs)

Mumbai won by 37 runs
Wankhede Stadium, Mumbai
Umpires: Bruce Oxenford (Aus) and Rod Tucker (Aus)
Player of the match: Hardik Pandya (Mumbai Indians)

- Chennai Super Kings won the toss and elected to field.
- Mumbai Indians became the first team in the IPL to win 100 matches.

6 April
20:00 (D/N)
Scorecard

Mumbai Indians; 136/7 (20 overs)	v	Sunrisers Hyderabad (H); 96 (17.4 overs)
Kieron Pollard 46* (26); Siddarth Kaul 2/34 (4 overs)		Deepak Hooda 20 (24); Alzarri Joseph 6/12 (3.4 overs)

Mumbai won by 40 runs
Rajiv Gandhi International Cricket Stadium, Hyderabad
Umpires: Anil Dandekar (Ind) and Nitin Menon (Ind)
Player of the match: Alzarri Joseph (Mumbai Indians)

- Sunrisers Hyderabad won the toss and elected to field.
- Alzarri Joseph (Mumbai Indians) took the best bowling figures in the IPL.

10 April
20:00 (D/N)
Scorecard

Kings XI Punjab; 197/4 (20 overs)	v	Mumbai Indians (H); 198/7 (20 overs)
K. L. Rahul 100* (64); Hardik Pandya 2/57 (4 overs)		Kieron Pollard 83 (31); Mohammed Shami 3/21 (4 overs)

Mumbai won by 3 wickets
Wankhede Stadium, Mumbai
Umpires: Yeshwant Barde (Ind) and Sundaram Ravi (Ind)
Player of the match: Kieron Pollard (Mumbai Indians)

- Mumbai Indians won the toss and elected to field.
- K. L. Rahul (Kings XI Punjab) scored his first century in the IPL.
- Mumbai Indians recorded their highest ever successful run chase in the IPL.

13 April
16:00 (D/N)
Scorecard

(H) Mumbai Indians; 187/5 (20 overs)	v	Rajasthan Royals; 188/6 (19.3 overs)
Quinton de Kock 81 (52); Jofra Archer 3/39 (4 overs)		Jos Buttler 89 (43); Krunal Pandya 3/34 (4 overs)

Rajasthan won by 4 wickets
Wankhede Stadium, Mumbai
Umpires: Nand Kishore (Ind) and Nitin Menon (Ind)
Player of the match: Jos Buttler (Rajasthan Royals)

- Rajasthan Royals won the toss and elected to field.

15 April
20:00 (D/N)
Scorecard

Royal Challengers Bangalore; 171/7 (20 overs)	v	Mumbai Indians (H); 172/5 (19 overs)
AB de Villiers 75 (51); Lasith Malinga 4/31 (4 overs)		Quinton de Kock 40 (26); Moeen Ali 2/18 (4 overs)

Mumbai won by 5 wickets
Wankhede Stadium, Mumbai
Umpires: Marais Erasmus (SA) and Nitin Menon (Ind)
Player of the match: Lasith Malinga (Mumbai Indians

- Mumbai Indians won the toss and elected to field.

18 April
20:00 (D/N)
Scorecard

Mumbai Indians; 168/5 (20 overs)	v	Delhi Capitals (H); 128/9 (20 overs)
Krunal Pandya 37* (26); Kagiso Rabada 2/38 (4 overs)		Shikhar Dhawan 35 (22); Rahul Chahar 3/19 (4 overs)

Mumbai won by 40 runs
Feroz Shah Kotla Ground, Delhi
Umpires: Nigel Llong (Eng) and Bruce Oxenford (Aus)
Player of the match: Hardik Pandya (Mumbai Indians)

- Mumbai Indians won the toss and elected to bat.

20 April
16:00 (D/N)
Scorecard

Mumbai Indians; 161/5 (20 overs)	v	Rajasthan Royals (H); 162/5 (19.1 overs)
Quinton de Kock 65 (47); Shreyas Gopal 2/21 (4 overs)		Steve Smith 59* (48); Rahul Chahar 3/29 (4 overs)

Rajasthan won by 5 wickets
Sawai Mansingh Stadium, Jaipur
Umpires: Yeshwant Barde (Ind) and Sundaram Ravi (Ind)
Player of the match: Steve Smith (Rajasthan Royals)

- Rajasthan Royals won the toss and elected to field.

26 April
20:00 (D/N)
Scorecard

Mumbai Indians; 155/4 (20 overs)	v	Chennai Super Kings (H); 109 (17.4 overs)
Rohit Sharma 67 (48); Mitchell Santner 2/13 (4 overs)		Murali Vijay 38 (35); Lasith Malinga 4/37 (3.4 overs)

Mumbai won by 46 runs
M. A. Chidambaram Stadium, Chennai
Umpires: Anil Chaudhary (Ind) and Nigel Llong (Eng)
Player of the match: Rohit Sharma (Mumbai Indians)

- Chennai Super Kings won the toss and elected to field.

28 April
20:00 (D/N)
Scorecard

(H) Kolkata Knight Riders; 232/2 (20 overs)	v	Mumbai Indians; 198/7 (20 overs)
Andre Russell 80* (40); Hardik Pandya 1/31 (3 overs)		Hardik Pandya 91 (34); Andre Russell 2/25 (4 overs)

Kolkata won by 34 runs
Eden Gardens, Kolkata
Umpires: Ian Gould (Eng) and Nitin Menon (Ind)
Player of the match: Andre Russell (Kolkata Knight Riders)

- Mumbai Indians won the toss and elected to field.

2 May
20:00 (D/N)
Scorecard

(H) Mumbai Indians; 162/5 (20 overs)	v	Sunrisers Hyderabad; 162/6 (20 overs)
Quinton de Kock 69* (58); Khaleel Ahmed 3/42 (4 overs)		Manish Pandey 71* (47); Hardik Pandya 2/20 (2 overs)

Match tied (Mumbai won the Super Over)
Wankhede Stadium, Mumbai
Umpires: C. K. Nandan (Ind) and Sundaram Ravi (Ind)
Player of the match: Jasprit Bumrah (Mumbai Indians)

- Mumbai Indians won the toss and elected to bat.
- Mumbai Indians qualified for the playoffs as a result of this match.

5 May
20:00 (D/N)
Scorecard

Kolkata Knight Riders; 133/7 (20 overs)	v	Mumbai Indians (H); 134/1 (16.1 overs)
Chris Lynn 41 (29); Lasith Malinga 3/35 (4 overs)		Rohit Sharma 55* (48); Prasidh Krishna 1/22 (3 overs)

Mumbai won by 9 wickets
Wankhede Stadium, Mumbai
Umpires: Nand Kishore (Ind) and C. K. Nandan (Ind)
Player of the match: Hardik Pandya (Mumbai Indians)

- Mumbai Indians won the toss and elected to field.
- Sunrisers Hyderabad qualified for the playoffs, becoming the first team ever to qualify with only 12 points, Kolkata Knight Riders were eliminated and Mumbai Indians advanced to Qualifier 1 as a result of this match.

==== Playoffs ====
Qualifier 1

7 May
19:30 (D/N)
Scorecard

Chennai Super Kings; 131/4 (20 overs)	v	Mumbai Indians; 132/4 (18.3 overs)
Ambati Rayudu 42* (37); Rahul Chahar 2/14 (4 overs)		Suryakumar Yadav 71* (54); Imran Tahir 2/33 (4 overs)

Mumbai Indians won by 6 wickets
M. A. Chidambaram Stadium, Chennai
Umpires: Nigel Llong (Eng) and Nitin Menon (Ind)
Player of the match: Suryakumar Yadav (Mumbai Indians)

- Chennai Super Kings won the toss and elected to bat.

==== Final ====
12 May
19:30 (D/N)
Scorecard

Mumbai Indians; 149/8 (20 overs)	v	Chennai Super Kings; 148/7 (20 overs)
Kieron Pollard 41* (25); Deepak Chahar 3/26 (4 overs)		Shane Watson 80 (59); Jasprit Bumrah 2/14 (4 overs)

Mumbai Indians won by 1 run
Rajiv Gandhi International Cricket Stadium, Hyderabad
Umpires: Ian Gould (Eng) and Nitin Menon (Ind)
Player of the match: Jasprit Bumrah (Mumbai Indians)

- Mumbai Indians won the toss and elected to bat.

== Statistics ==
=== Most runs ===
No.	Name	Match	Inns	NO	Runs	HS	Ave.	BF	SR	100s	50s	0	4s	6s
1	Quinton de Kock	16	16	1	529	81	35.26	398	132.91	0	4	1	45	25
2	Suryakumar Yadav	16	14	2	424	71*	32.61	324	130.86	0	2	1	45	10
3	Rohit Sharma	15	15	1	405	67	28.92	315	128.57	0	2	0	52	10
4	Hardik Pandya	16	15	6	402	91	44.66	210	191.42	0	1	1	28	29
5	Kieron Pollard	16	14	6	279	83	34.87	178	156.74	0	1	0	14	22

- Source:Cricinfo

=== Most wickets ===
No.	Name	Match	Inns	Overs	Maidens	Runs	Wickets	BBI	Ave.	Econ.	SR	4W	5W
1	Jasprit Bumrah	16	16	61.4	1	409	19	3/20	21.52	6.65	19.4	0	0
2	Lasith Malinga	12	12	44.5	0	438	16	4/31	27.37	9.76	16.8	2	0
3	Hardik Pandya	16	16	42.3	0	390	14	3/20	27.64	9.17	18.2	0	0
4	Rahul Chahar	13	13	47.0	0	308	13	3/19	23.69	6.55	21.6	0	0
5	Krunal Pandya	16	16	46.0	0	335	12	3/34	27.91	7.28	23.0	0	0

- Source:Cricinfo

== Player of the match awards ==
No.	Date	Player	Opponent	Result	Contribution	Ref.
1	28 March 2019	Jasprit Bumrah	Royal Challengers Bangalore	Won by 6 runs	3/20 (4 overs)	
2	3 April 2019	Hardik Pandya	Chennai Super Kings	Won by 37 runs	25 (8) & 3/20 (4 overs)	
3	6 April 2019	Alzarri Joseph	Sunrisers Hyderabad	Won by 40 runs	6/12 (3.4 overs)	
4	10 April 2019	Kieron Pollard	Kings XI Punjab	Won by 3 wickets	83 (31 balls)	
5	15 April 2019	Lasith Malinga	Royal Challengers Bangalore	Won by 5 wickets	4/31 (4 overs)	
6	18 April 2019	Hardik Pandya	Delhi Capitals	Won by 40 runs	32 (15 balls) and 1/17 (2 overs)	
7	26 April 2019	Rohit Sharma	Chennai Super Kings	Won by 46 runs	67 (48 balls)	
8	2 May 2019	Jasprit Bumrah	Sunrisers Hyderabad	Mumbai won the Super Over	2/31 (4 overs)	
9	5 May 2019	Hardik Pandya	Kolkata Knight Riders	Won by 9 wickets	2/20 (3 overs)	
10	7 May 2019	Suryakumar Yadav	Chennai Super Kings	Won by 6 wickets	71* runs in 54 balls	
11	12 May 2019	Jasprit Bumrah	Chennai Super Kings	Won by 1 run	2/14 (4 overs)	
