= 2019 Sunrisers Hyderabad season =

Indian Premier League cricket team season

Sunrisers Hyderabad
2019 season
- Coach: Tom Moody
- Captain: Kane Williamson; Bhuvneshwar Kumar (Note: Bhuvneshwar Kumar stood-in as captain when Kane Williamson got injured at the start of the IPL 2019.)
- Ground(s): Rajiv Gandhi International Cricket Stadium, Hyderabad (Capacity: 38,000)
- IPL: Playoffs (4th)
- Most runs: David Warner (692)
- Most wickets: Khaleel Ahmed (19)
- Most catches: Vijay Shankar (10); Deepak Hooda (10)
- Most wicket-keeping dismissals: Jonny Bairstow (11)

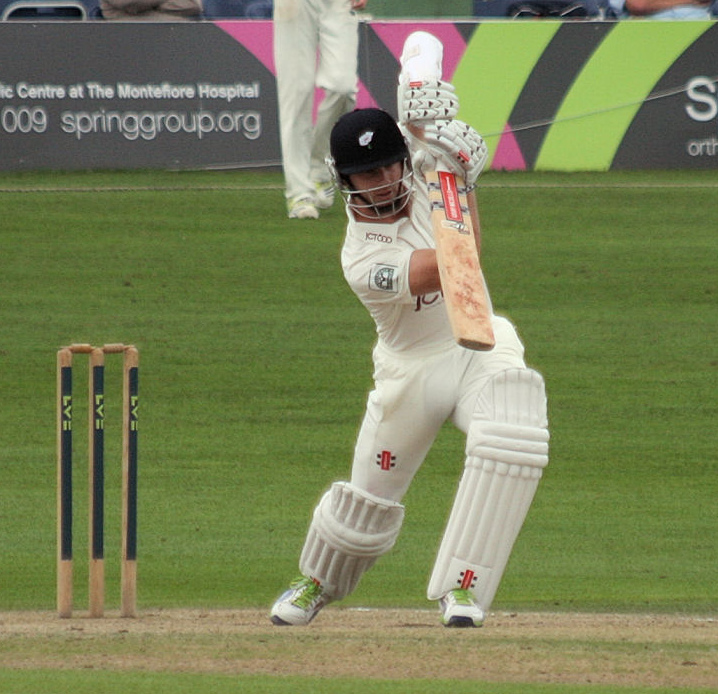
Kane Williamson returned as the captain of the Sunrisers for the 2019 IPL

Sunrisers Hyderabad (SRH) are a franchise cricket team based in Hyderabad, Telangana, India, which plays in the Indian Premier League (IPL). They were one of the eight teams to compete in the 2019 Indian Premier League, making their seventh outing in all the IPL tournaments. The team was captained by Kane Williamson and coached by Tom Moody with Simon Helmot as assistant coach, Muttiah Muralitharan as bowling coach and V. V. S. Laxman as mentor.

== Background ==
The 2019 Indian Premier League began on 23 March 2019. The venue of tournament had been the subject of speculation during the players' auction due to the clash of dates with the Indian general elections and the initial news reports suggested that the tournament could be held outside India with South Africa and United Arab Emirates as the potential replacements. However, on 8 January 2019, the Board for Control of Cricket in India (BCCI) confirmed that the tournament would take place entirely in India though the schedule is yet to be decided. As per the BCCI press release, the full schedule was expected to be released in February and suggested that they might consider the change of venues if needed once the election dates were announced.

== Player acquisition ==
The Sunrisers Hyderabad traded Shikhar Dhawan and paid ₹1.75 crore (US$180,000) in cash to the Delhi Daredevils in exchange for three players – Vijay Shankar, Abhishek Sharma and Shahbaz Nadeem during the IPL trading window before the auction. Dhawan was associated with the Sunrisers since their inception in 2013 and the reason for the Sunrisers to trade their most successful batsmen was widely reported as Dhawan's unhappiness over the financial reasons. The Sunrisers retained 17 players and released eight players as they announced their retention list on 15 November ahead of the auction. They entered into the auction with the remaining salary cap of ₹9.7 crore (US$1.0 million) to fill five available slots, of which two are for the overseas players.

The BCCI announced on 3 December that the 2019 IPL players' auction was scheduled to be held on 18 December at Jaipur. The auction for the Sunrisers were a quiet affair with most of the slots already filled before the auction. They opened their account by winning the bid for the English wicket-keeper, Jonny Bairstow for ₹2.2 crore (US$230,000) and bolstered their wicket-keeping strength by welcoming back Wriddhiman Saha. They rounded-off the auction by acquiring the services of Martin Guptill at the base price of ₹1 crore (US$100,000) and hence increasing their squad to 23 players with ₹5.3 crore (US$550,000) remaining in their fund.

Retained: Basil Thampi, Bhuvneshwar Kumar, Deepak Hooda, Manish Pandey, Thangarasu Natarajan, Ricky Bhui, Sandeep Sharma, Siddarth Kaul, Shreevats Goswami, Khaleel Ahmed, Yusuf Pathan, Billy Stanlake, David Warner, Kane Williamson, Rashid Khan, Mohammad Nabi, Shakib Al Hasan

Released: Sachin Baby, Tanmay Agarwal, Wriddhiman Saha, Chris Jordan, Carlos Brathwaite, Alex Hales, Bipul Sharma, Mehdi Hasan

Traded In: Abhishek Sharma, Vijay Shankar, Shahbaz Nadeem

Traded Out: Shikhar Dhawan

Added: Jonny Bairstow, Wriddhiman Saha, Martin Guptill^{[REC-1]}

== Squad ==
- Players with international caps are listed in **bold**.
- **Signed Year** denotes year from which player is continuously associated with Sunrisers Hyderabad

No.	Name	Nationality	Birth date	Batting style	Bowling style	Signed year	Salary	Notes
Batsmen
13	**Martin Guptill**	New Zealand	30 September 1986 (aged 32)	Right-handed	Right-arm off break	2019	₹1 crore (US$100,000)	Overseas.
21	**Manish Pandey**	India	10 September 1989 (aged 29)	Right-handed	Right-arm off break	2018	₹11 crore (US$1.1 million)	
22	**Kane Williamson**	New Zealand	8 August 1990 (aged 28)	Right-handed	Right-arm off break	2015	₹3 crore (US$310,000)	Captain, Overseas.
31	**David Warner**	Australia	27 October 1986 (aged 32)	Left-handed	Right-arm leg break	2014	₹12 crore (US$1.2 million)	Overseas. Unavailable due to national commitments.
55	Ricky Bhui	India	29 November 1996 (aged 22)	Right-handed	Right-arm leg break	2014	₹20 lakh (US$21,000)	
All-rounders
5	Deepak Hooda	India	19 April 1995 (aged 23)	Right-handed	Right-arm off break	2016	₹3.6 crore (US$370,000)	
7	**Mohammad Nabi**	Afghanistan	1 January 1985 (aged 34)	Right-handed	Right-arm off break	2017	₹1 crore (US$100,000)	Overseas.
17	**Yusuf Pathan**	India	17 November 1982 (aged 36)	Right-handed	Right-arm off break	2018	₹1.9 crore (US$200,000)	
18	Abhishek Sharma	India	4 September 2000 (aged 18)	Left-handed	Left-arm orthodox spin	2019	₹55 lakh (US$57,000)	
59	**Vijay Shankar**	India	26 January 1991 (aged 28)	Right-handed	Right-arm medium-fast	2019	₹3.2 crore (US$330,000)	
75	**Shakib Al Hasan**	Bangladesh	24 March 1987 (aged 31)	Left-handed	Left-arm orthodox spin	2018	₹2 crore (US$210,000)	Overseas. Unavailable due to national commitments.
Wicket-keepers
3	Shreevats Goswami	India	18 May 1989 (aged 29)	Left-handed		2018	₹1 crore (US$100,000)	
6	**Wriddhiman Saha**	India	24 October 1984 (aged 34)	Right-handed		2018	₹1.2 crore (US$120,000)	
51	**Jonny Bairstow**	England	26 September 1989 (aged 29)	Right-handed	Right-arm medium-fast	2019	₹2.2 crore (US$230,000)	Overseas. Unavailable due to national commitments.
Bowlers
8	Shahbaz Nadeem	India	12 August 1989 (aged 29)	Right-handed	Left-arm orthodox spin	2019	₹3.2 crore (US$330,000)	
9	**Siddarth Kaul**	India	19 May 1990 (aged 28)	Right-handed	Right-arm medium-fast	2016	₹3.8 crore (US$390,000)	
15	**Bhuvneshwar Kumar**	India	5 February 1990 (aged 29)	Right-handed	Right-arm medium-fast	2014	₹8.5 crore (US$880,000)	Vice-captain.
19	**Rashid Khan**	Afghanistan	20 September 1998 (aged 20)	Right-handed	Right-arm leg break	2017	₹9 crore (US$930,000)	Overseas.
27	**Khaleel Ahmed**	India	5 December 1997 (aged 21)	Right-handed	Left-arm medium-fast	2018	₹3 crore (US$310,000)	
30	Basil Thampi	India	11 September 1993 (aged 25)	Right-handed	Right-arm medium-fast	2018	₹95 lakh (US$99,000)	
37	**Billy Stanlake**	Australia	4 November 1994 (aged 24)	Left-handed	Right-arm medium-fast	2018	₹50 lakh (US$52,000)	Overseas.
44	Thangarasu Natarajan	India	27 May 1991 (aged 27)	Left-handed	Left-arm medium-fast	2018	₹40 lakh (US$42,000)	
66	**Sandeep Sharma**	India	18 May 1993 (aged 25)	Right-handed	Right-arm medium-fast	2018	₹3 crore (US$310,000)	

== Administration and support staff ==
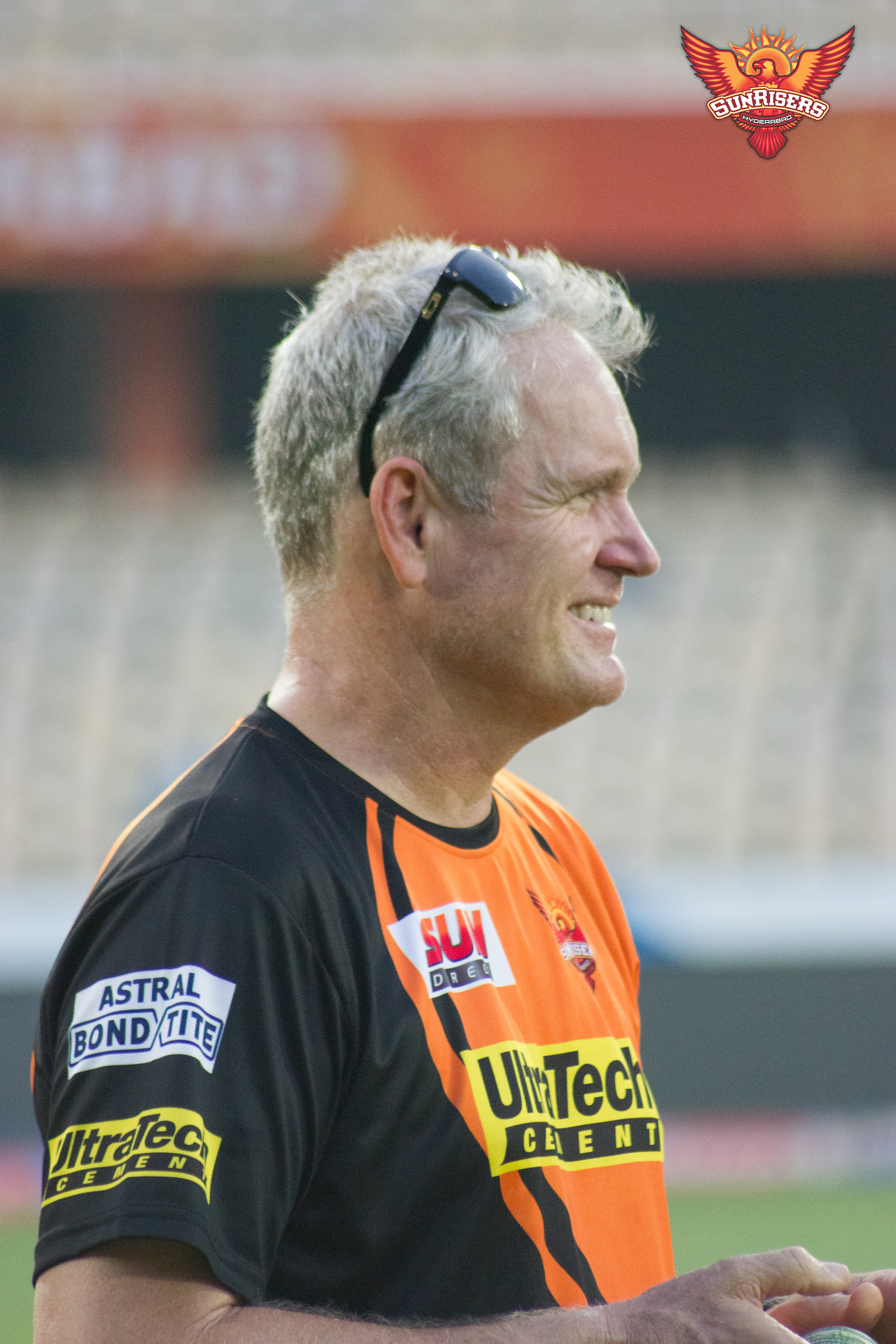
Tom Moody

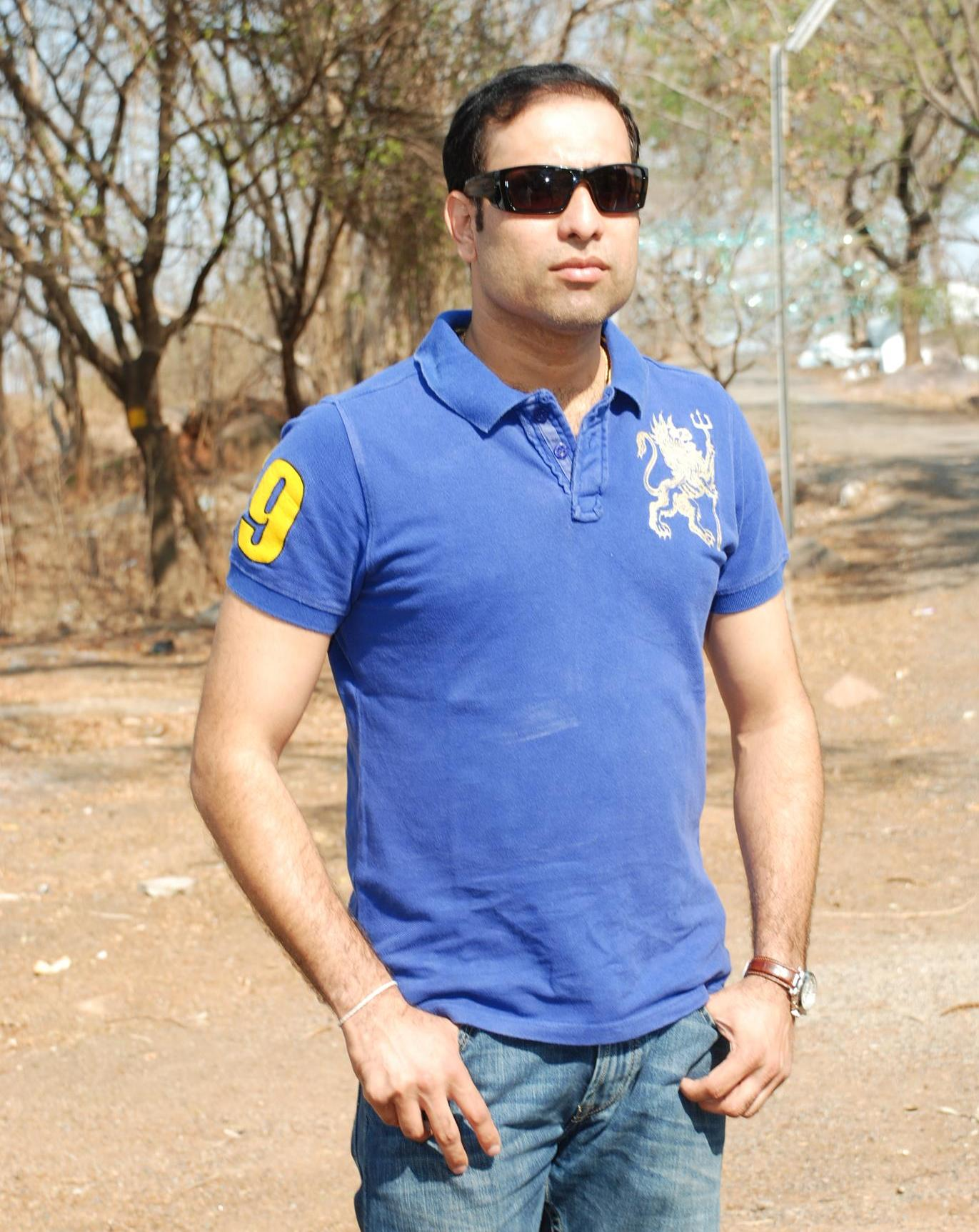
VVS Laxman

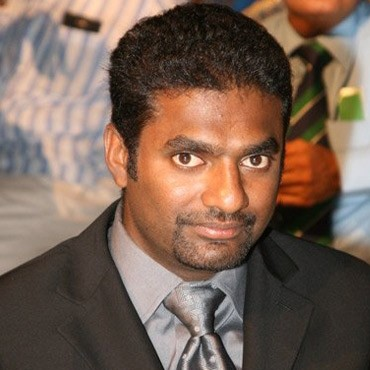
Muralitharan

Position	Name
Owner	Kalanithi Maran (Sun Network)
CEO	K Shanmugham
Head coach	Tom Moody
Assistant coach	Simon Helmot
Bowling coach	Muttiah Muralitharan
Mentor	V. V. S. Laxman
Physio	Theo Kapakoulakis
Physical trainer	Jade Roberts

== Kit manufacturers and sponsors ==
Kit Manufacturers	Shirt Sponsor (Chest)	Shirt Sponsor (Back)	Chest Branding
TYKA Sports	Coolwinks	Red FM	Rupa
Source :

T20 uniform

== Indian Premier League ==
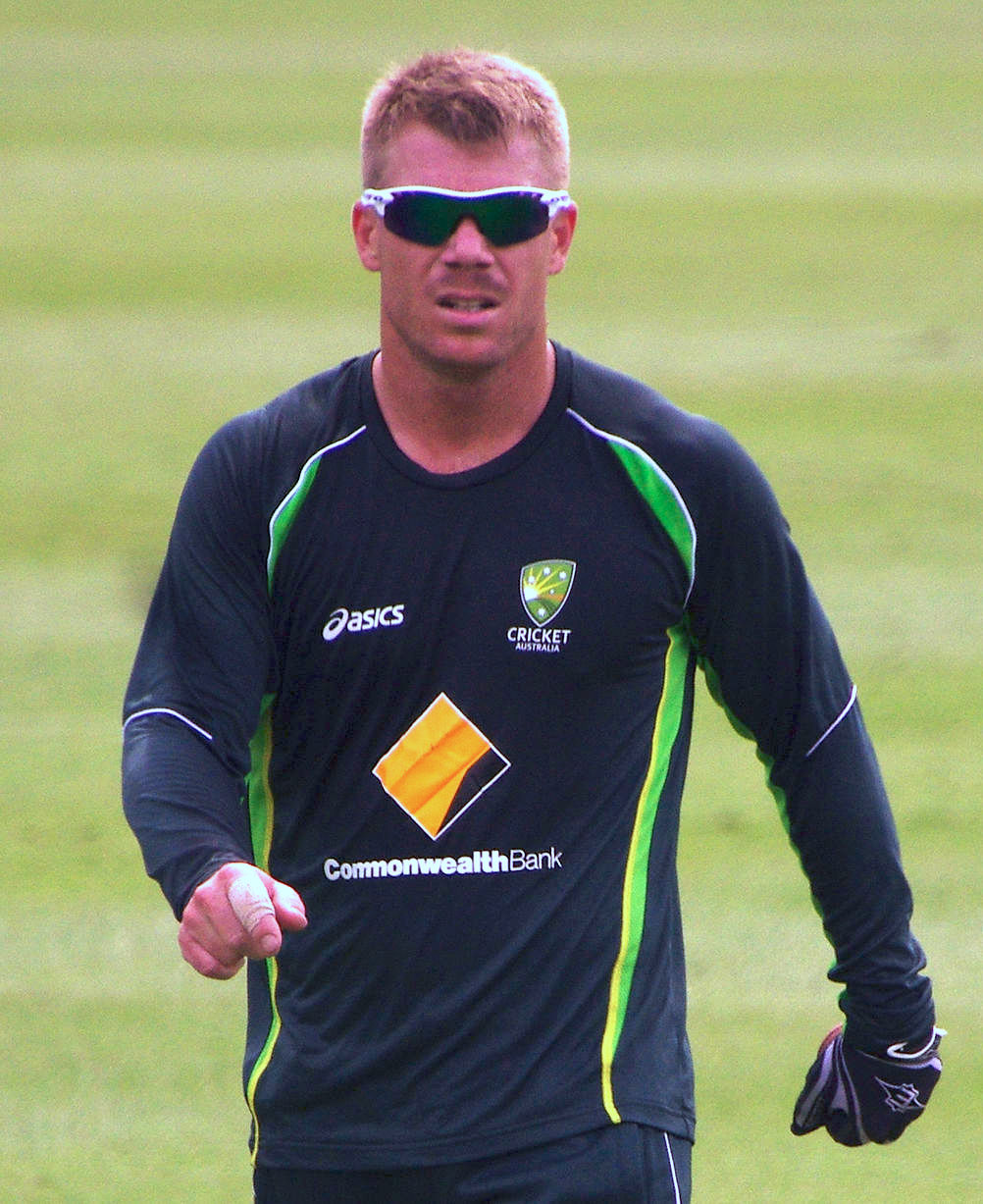
David Warner returned to the Sunrisers squad for the IPL 2019

=== Offseason ===
The schedule for the first two weeks of this season were released on 18 February with the Sunrisers Hyderabad playing their first match against the Kolkata Knight Riders on 24 March in an away game at Kolkata while they played their first home match against the Rajasthan Royals on 29 March. The Board of Control for Cricket in India (BCCI) released the schedule for the remaining fixtures of the league stage on 19 March following the release of the Indian general election schedule.

David Warner came back into the squad following the completion of a season ban imposed on him by the BCCI due to his involvement in a ball-tampering scandal. Despite the return of Warner, the Sunrisers' coach Tom Moody announced that Kane Williamson would continue to lead the side during the IPL 2019.

Speaking about Sunrisers' squad available this season and Williamson's captaincy record, coach Moody said,

We have a very stable squad and the performance of the team in 2018 exhibited the same as we topped the table. The new, young players will bring in even more exuberance and aggression to this side. We felt that Kane Williamson did a wonderful job last season. We decided not to tinker much as we are already a settled unit. The only concern we had was regarding his injury. Williamson is a world-class player and a great leader and I’m sure that he will continue to do well. Under the able leadership of Kane Williamson, this team has the potential and capability to go one step ahead and bag the trophy this time around.

== Season overview ==
=== League stage ===
Standings

Pos	Team	Pld	W	L	NR	Pts	NRR	
1	Mumbai Indians (C)	14	9	5	0	18	0.421	Advanced to Qualifier 1
2	Chennai Super Kings (R)	14	9	5	0	18	0.131	Advanced to Qualifier 1
3	Delhi Capitals	14	9	5	0	18	0.044	Advanced to the Eliminator
4	Sunrisers Hyderabad	14	6	8	0	12	0.577	Advanced to the Eliminator
5	Kolkata Knight Riders	14	6	8	0	12	0.028	
6	Kings XI Punjab	14	6	8	0	12	−0.251	
7	Rajasthan Royals	14	5	8	1	11	−0.449	
8	Royal Challengers Bangalore	14	5	8	1	11	−0.607	

Source: ESPNCricinfo
The four top ranked teams qualify for the playoffs

Results by match

Round	1	2	3	4	5	6	7	8	9	10	11	12	13	14
Ground	A	H	H	A	H	A	H	H	H	A	A	H	A	A
Result	L	W	W	W	L	L	L	W	W	L	L	W	L	L
Position	6	4	1	1	2	4	6	5	4	4	4	4	4	4

Source: Fixtures
A = Away; H = Home; W = Win; D = Draw; L = Loss

=== Playoff stage ===
Semifinals
7 May — Chennai
1	Mumbai Indians	132/4 (18.3 overs)
2	Chennai Super Kings	131/4 (20 overs)
8 May — Visakhapatnam
3	Delhi Capitals	165/8 (19.5 overs)
4	Sunrisers Hyderabad	162/8 (20 overs)

Preliminary final
10 May — Visakhapatnam
2	Chennai Super Kings	151/4 (19 overs)
3	Delhi Capitals	147/9 (20 overs)

Final
12 May — Hyderabad
1	Mumbai Indians	149/8 (20 overs)
2	Chennai Super Kings	148/7 (20 overs)

== Fixtures ==
=== League stage ===
24 March	Sunrisers Hyderabad; 181/3 (20 overs)	v	Kolkata Knight Riders (H); 183/4 (19.4 overs)	Kolkata Knight Riders won by 6 wickets
16:00 (D/N) Match 1 Scorecard	Sunrisers Hyderabad; 181/3 (20 overs)	v	Kolkata Knight Riders (H); 183/4 (19.4 overs)	Eden Gardens, Kolkata; Umpires: Anil Chaudhary (Ind) and Chris Gaffaney (NZ); Player of the match: Andre Russell (Kolkata Knight Riders)
16:00 (D/N) Match 1 Scorecard	David Warner 85 (53); Andre Russell 2/32 (3 overs)		Nitish Rana 68 (47); Rashid Khan 1/26 (4 overs)	Eden Gardens, Kolkata; Umpires: Anil Chaudhary (Ind) and Chris Gaffaney (NZ); Player of the match: Andre Russell (Kolkata Knight Riders)
Kolkata Knight Riders won the toss and elected to field.				Eden Gardens, Kolkata; Umpires: Anil Chaudhary (Ind) and Chris Gaffaney (NZ); Player of the match: Andre Russell (Kolkata Knight Riders)

29 March	Rajasthan Royals; 198/2 (20 overs)	v	Sunrisers Hyderabad (H); 201/5 (19 overs)	Sunrisers Hyderabad won by 5 wickets
20:00 (D/N) Match 2 Scorecard	Rajasthan Royals; 198/2 (20 overs)	v	Sunrisers Hyderabad (H); 201/5 (19 overs)	Rajiv Gandhi International Cricket Stadium, Hyderabad; Umpires: Bruce Oxenford (Aus) and Chettithody Shamshuddin (Ind); Player of the match: Rashid Khan (Sunrisers Hyderabad)
20:00 (D/N) Match 2 Scorecard	Sanju Samson 102* (55); Rashid Khan 1/24 (4 overs)		David Warner 69 (37); Shreyas Gopal 3/27 (4 overs)	Rajiv Gandhi International Cricket Stadium, Hyderabad; Umpires: Bruce Oxenford (Aus) and Chettithody Shamshuddin (Ind); Player of the match: Rashid Khan (Sunrisers Hyderabad)
Rajasthan Royals won the toss and elected to bat.; This was the Sunrisers' highest successful run chase in the IPL.				Rajiv Gandhi International Cricket Stadium, Hyderabad; Umpires: Bruce Oxenford (Aus) and Chettithody Shamshuddin (Ind); Player of the match: Rashid Khan (Sunrisers Hyderabad)

31 March	(H) Sunrisers Hyderabad; 231/2 (20 overs)	v	Royal Challengers Bangalore; 113 (19.5 overs)	Sunrisers Hyderabad won by 118 runs
16:00 (D/N) Match 3 Scorecard	(H) Sunrisers Hyderabad; 231/2 (20 overs)	v	Royal Challengers Bangalore; 113 (19.5 overs)	Rajiv Gandhi International Cricket Stadium, Hyderabad; Umpires: K. N. Ananthapadmanabhan (Ind) and Sundaram Ravi (Ind); Player of the match: Jonny Bairstow (Sunrisers Hyderabad)
16:00 (D/N) Match 3 Scorecard	Jonny Bairstow 114 (56); Yuzvendra Chahal 1/44 (4 overs)		Colin de Grandhomme 37 (32); Mohammad Nabi 4/11 (4 overs)	Rajiv Gandhi International Cricket Stadium, Hyderabad; Umpires: K. N. Ananthapadmanabhan (Ind) and Sundaram Ravi (Ind); Player of the match: Jonny Bairstow (Sunrisers Hyderabad)
Royal Challengers Bangalore won the toss and elected to field.; Prayas Ray Barman was the youngest player to debut in the IPL.; David Warner and Jonny Bairstow (Sunrisers Hyderabad) recorded the highest first wicket partnership (185 runs) in the IPL.; Warner and Bairstow also became the first pair ever to record three century partnerships in three consecutive matches in the IPL.; 231/2 was the highest total for the Sunrisers in the IPL.; This was the second instance in the IPL and the fourth overall for two batsmen to score hundreds in an innings in T20s.; This was the largest win for the Sunrisers and the second-largest defeat for Royal Challengers in terms of runs.				Rajiv Gandhi International Cricket Stadium, Hyderabad; Umpires: K. N. Ananthapadmanabhan (Ind) and Sundaram Ravi (Ind); Player of the match: Jonny Bairstow (Sunrisers Hyderabad)

4 April	(H) Delhi Capitals; 129/8 (20 overs)	v	Sunrisers Hyderabad; 131/5 (18.3 overs)	Sunrisers Hyderabad won by 5 wickets
20:00 (D/N) Match 4 Scorecard	(H) Delhi Capitals; 129/8 (20 overs)	v	Sunrisers Hyderabad; 131/5 (18.3 overs)	Feroz Shah Kotla Ground, Delhi; Umpires: K. N. Ananthapadmanabhan (Ind) and Chettithody Shamshuddin (Ind); Player of the match: Jonny Bairstow (Sunrisers Hyderabad)
20:00 (D/N) Match 4 Scorecard	Shreyas Iyer 43 (41); Mohammad Nabi 2/21 (4 overs)		Jonny Bairstow 48 (28); Ishant Sharma 1/5 (1 over)	Feroz Shah Kotla Ground, Delhi; Umpires: K. N. Ananthapadmanabhan (Ind) and Chettithody Shamshuddin (Ind); Player of the match: Jonny Bairstow (Sunrisers Hyderabad)
Sunrisers Hyderabad won the toss and elected to field.				Feroz Shah Kotla Ground, Delhi; Umpires: K. N. Ananthapadmanabhan (Ind) and Chettithody Shamshuddin (Ind); Player of the match: Jonny Bairstow (Sunrisers Hyderabad)

6 April	Mumbai Indians; 136/7 (20 overs)	v	Sunrisers Hyderabad (H); 96 (17.4 overs)	Mumbai Indians won by 40 runs
20:00 (D/N) Match 5 Scorecard	Mumbai Indians; 136/7 (20 overs)	v	Sunrisers Hyderabad (H); 96 (17.4 overs)	Rajiv Gandhi International Cricket Stadium, Hyderabad; Umpires: Anil Dandekar (Ind) and Nitin Menon (Ind); Player of the match: Alzarri Joseph (Mumbai Indians)
20:00 (D/N) Match 5 Scorecard	Kieron Pollard 46* (26); Siddarth Kaul 2/34 (4 overs)		Deepak Hooda 20 (24); Alzarri Joseph 6/12 (3.4 overs)	Rajiv Gandhi International Cricket Stadium, Hyderabad; Umpires: Anil Dandekar (Ind) and Nitin Menon (Ind); Player of the match: Alzarri Joseph (Mumbai Indians)
Sunrisers Hyderabad won the toss and elected to field.; Alzarri Joseph (Mumbai Indians) took the best bowling figures in the IPL.				Rajiv Gandhi International Cricket Stadium, Hyderabad; Umpires: Anil Dandekar (Ind) and Nitin Menon (Ind); Player of the match: Alzarri Joseph (Mumbai Indians)

8 April	Sunrisers Hyderabad; 150/4 (20 overs)	v	Kings XI Punjab (H); 151/4 (19.5 overs)	Kings XI Punjab won by 6 wickets
20:00 (D/N) Match 6 Scorecard	Sunrisers Hyderabad; 150/4 (20 overs)	v	Kings XI Punjab (H); 151/4 (19.5 overs)	Punjab Cricket Association IS Bindra Stadium, Mohali; Umpires: Anil Dandekar (Ind) and Marais Erasmus (SA); Player of the match: K. L. Rahul (Kings XI Punjab)
20:00 (D/N) Match 6 Scorecard	David Warner 70* (62); Mohammed Shami 1/30 (4 overs)		K. L. Rahul 71* (53); Sandeep Sharma 2/21 (4 overs)	Punjab Cricket Association IS Bindra Stadium, Mohali; Umpires: Anil Dandekar (Ind) and Marais Erasmus (SA); Player of the match: K. L. Rahul (Kings XI Punjab)
Kings XI Punjab won the toss and elected to field.				Punjab Cricket Association IS Bindra Stadium, Mohali; Umpires: Anil Dandekar (Ind) and Marais Erasmus (SA); Player of the match: K. L. Rahul (Kings XI Punjab)

14 April	Delhi Capitals; 155/7 (20 overs)	v	Sunrisers Hyderabad (H); 116 (18.5 overs)	Delhi Capitals won by 39 runs
20:00 (D/N) Match 7 Scorecard	Delhi Capitals; 155/7 (20 overs)	v	Sunrisers Hyderabad (H); 116 (18.5 overs)	Rajiv Gandhi International Cricket Stadium, Hyderabad; Umpires: Anil Chaudhary (Ind) and Bruce Oxenford (Aus); Player of the match: Keemo Paul (Delhi Capitals)
20:00 (D/N) Match 7 Scorecard	Shreyas Iyer 45 (40); Khaleel Ahmed 3/30 (4 overs)		David Warner 51 (47); Kagiso Rabada 4/22 (3.5 overs)	Rajiv Gandhi International Cricket Stadium, Hyderabad; Umpires: Anil Chaudhary (Ind) and Bruce Oxenford (Aus); Player of the match: Keemo Paul (Delhi Capitals)
Sunrisers Hyderabad won the toss and elected to field.				Rajiv Gandhi International Cricket Stadium, Hyderabad; Umpires: Anil Chaudhary (Ind) and Bruce Oxenford (Aus); Player of the match: Keemo Paul (Delhi Capitals)

17 April	Chennai Super Kings; 132/5 (20 overs)	v	Sunrisers Hyderabad (H); 137/4 (16.5 overs)	Sunrisers Hyderabad won by 6 wickets.
20:00 (D/N) Match 8 Scorecard	Chennai Super Kings; 132/5 (20 overs)	v	Sunrisers Hyderabad (H); 137/4 (16.5 overs)	Rajiv Gandhi International Cricket Stadium, Hyderabad; Umpires: Ulhas Gandhe (Ind) and Ian Gould (Eng); Player of the match: David Warner (Sunrisers Hyderabad)
20:00 (D/N) Match 8 Scorecard	Faf du Plessis 45 (31); Rashid Khan 2/17 (4 overs)		Jonny Bairstow 61* (44); Imran Tahir 2/20 (4 overs)	Rajiv Gandhi International Cricket Stadium, Hyderabad; Umpires: Ulhas Gandhe (Ind) and Ian Gould (Eng); Player of the match: David Warner (Sunrisers Hyderabad)
Chennai Super Kings won the toss and elected to bat.				Rajiv Gandhi International Cricket Stadium, Hyderabad; Umpires: Ulhas Gandhe (Ind) and Ian Gould (Eng); Player of the match: David Warner (Sunrisers Hyderabad)

21 April	Kolkata Knight Riders; 159/8 (20 overs)	v	Sunrisers Hyderabad (H); 161/1 (15 overs)	Sunrisers Hyderabad won by 9 wickets.
16:00 (D/N) Match 9 Scorecard	Kolkata Knight Riders; 159/8 (20 overs)	v	Sunrisers Hyderabad (H); 161/1 (15 overs)	Rajiv Gandhi International Cricket Stadium, Hyderabad; Umpires: Nigel Llong (Eng) and Nitin Menon (Ind); Player of the match: Khaleel Ahmed (Sunrisers Hyderabad)
16:00 (D/N) Match 9 Scorecard	Chris Lynn 51 (47); Khaleel Ahmed 3/33 (4 overs)		Jonny Bairstow 80* (43); Prithvi Raj 1/29 (3 overs)	Rajiv Gandhi International Cricket Stadium, Hyderabad; Umpires: Nigel Llong (Eng) and Nitin Menon (Ind); Player of the match: Khaleel Ahmed (Sunrisers Hyderabad)
Sunrisers Hyderabad won the toss and elected to field.; David Warner and Jonny Bairstow (Sunrisers Hyderabad) scored 786 runs for the opening wicket for Sunrisers, most by an opening combination in a season in the IPL.				Rajiv Gandhi International Cricket Stadium, Hyderabad; Umpires: Nigel Llong (Eng) and Nitin Menon (Ind); Player of the match: Khaleel Ahmed (Sunrisers Hyderabad)

23 April	Sunrisers Hyderabad; 175/3 (20 overs)	v	Chennai Super Kings (H); 176/4 (19.5 overs)	Chennai Super Kings won by 6 wickets.
20:00 (D/N) Match 10 Scorecard	Sunrisers Hyderabad; 175/3 (20 overs)	v	Chennai Super Kings (H); 176/4 (19.5 overs)	M. A. Chidambaram Stadium, Chennai; Umpires: Anil Chaudhary (Ind) and Nigel Llong (Eng); Player of the match: Shane Watson (Chennai Super Kings)
20:00 (D/N) Match 10 Scorecard	Manish Pandey 83* (49); Harbhajan Singh 2/39 (4 overs)		Shane Watson 96 (53); Bhuvneshwar Kumar 1/18 (4 overs)	M. A. Chidambaram Stadium, Chennai; Umpires: Anil Chaudhary (Ind) and Nigel Llong (Eng); Player of the match: Shane Watson (Chennai Super Kings)
Chennai Super Kings won the toss and elected to field.				M. A. Chidambaram Stadium, Chennai; Umpires: Anil Chaudhary (Ind) and Nigel Llong (Eng); Player of the match: Shane Watson (Chennai Super Kings)

27 April	Sunrisers Hyderabad; 160/8 (20 overs)	v	Rajasthan Royals (H); 161/3 (19.1 overs)	Rajasthan Royals won by 7 wickets
20:00 (D/N) Match 11 Scorecard	Sunrisers Hyderabad; 160/8 (20 overs)	v	Rajasthan Royals (H); 161/3 (19.1 overs)	Sawai Mansingh Stadium, Jaipur; Umpires: Yeshwant Barde (Ind) and Nand Kishore (Ind); Player of the match: Jaydev Unadkat (Rajasthan Royals)
20:00 (D/N) Match 11 Scorecard	Manish Pandey 61 (36); Jaydev Unadkat 2/26 (4 overs)		Sanju Samson 48* (32); Shakib Al Hasan 1/26 (3.1 overs)	Sawai Mansingh Stadium, Jaipur; Umpires: Yeshwant Barde (Ind) and Nand Kishore (Ind); Player of the match: Jaydev Unadkat (Rajasthan Royals)
Rajasthan Royals won the toss and elected to field.				Sawai Mansingh Stadium, Jaipur; Umpires: Yeshwant Barde (Ind) and Nand Kishore (Ind); Player of the match: Jaydev Unadkat (Rajasthan Royals)

29 April	(H) Sunrisers Hyderabad; 212/6 (20 overs)	v	Kings XI Punjab; 167/8 (20 overs)	Sunrisers Hyderabad won by 45 runs
20:00 (D/N) Match 12 Scorecard	(H) Sunrisers Hyderabad; 212/6 (20 overs)	v	Kings XI Punjab; 167/8 (20 overs)	Rajiv Gandhi International Cricket Stadium, Hyderabad; Umpires: C. K. Nandan (Ind) and Sundaram Ravi (Ind); Player of the match: David Warner (Sunrisers Hyderabad)
20:00 (D/N) Match 12 Scorecard	David Warner 81 (56); Ravichandran Ashwin 2/30 (4 overs)		K. L. Rahul 79 (56); Rashid Khan 3/21 (4 overs)	Rajiv Gandhi International Cricket Stadium, Hyderabad; Umpires: C. K. Nandan (Ind) and Sundaram Ravi (Ind); Player of the match: David Warner (Sunrisers Hyderabad)
Kings XI Punjab won the toss and elected to field.				Rajiv Gandhi International Cricket Stadium, Hyderabad; Umpires: C. K. Nandan (Ind) and Sundaram Ravi (Ind); Player of the match: David Warner (Sunrisers Hyderabad)

2 May	(H) Mumbai Indians; 162/5 (20 overs)	v	Sunrisers Hyderabad; 162/6 (20 overs)	Match tied (Mumbai Indians won the Super Over)
20:00 (D/N) Match 13 Scorecard	(H) Mumbai Indians; 162/5 (20 overs)	v	Sunrisers Hyderabad; 162/6 (20 overs)	Wankhede Stadium, Mumbai; Umpires: C. K. Nandan (Ind) and Sundaram Ravi (Ind); Player of the match: Jasprit Bumrah (Mumbai Indians)
20:00 (D/N) Match 13 Scorecard	Quinton de Kock 69* (58); Khaleel Ahmed 3/42 (4 overs)		Manish Pandey 71* (47); Hardik Pandya 2/20 (2 overs)	Wankhede Stadium, Mumbai; Umpires: C. K. Nandan (Ind) and Sundaram Ravi (Ind); Player of the match: Jasprit Bumrah (Mumbai Indians)
Mumbai Indians won the toss and elected to bat.				Wankhede Stadium, Mumbai; Umpires: C. K. Nandan (Ind) and Sundaram Ravi (Ind); Player of the match: Jasprit Bumrah (Mumbai Indians)

4 May	Sunrisers Hyderabad; 175/7 (20 overs)	v	Royal Challengers Bangalore (H); 178/6 (19.2 overs)	Royal Challengers Bangalore won by 4 wickets
20:00 (D/N) Match 14 Scorecard	Sunrisers Hyderabad; 175/7 (20 overs)	v	Royal Challengers Bangalore (H); 178/6 (19.2 overs)	M. Chinnaswamy Stadium, Bangalore; Umpires: Anil Chaudhary (Ind) and Nigel Llong (Eng); Player of the match: Shimron Hetmyer (Royal Challengers Bangalore)
20:00 (D/N) Match 14 Scorecard	Kane Williamson 70* (43); Washington Sundar 3/24 (3 overs)		Shimron Hetmyer 75 (47); Khaleel Ahmed 3/37 (4 overs)	M. Chinnaswamy Stadium, Bangalore; Umpires: Anil Chaudhary (Ind) and Nigel Llong (Eng); Player of the match: Shimron Hetmyer (Royal Challengers Bangalore)
Royal Challengers Bangalore won the toss and elected to field.				M. Chinnaswamy Stadium, Bangalore; Umpires: Anil Chaudhary (Ind) and Nigel Llong (Eng); Player of the match: Shimron Hetmyer (Royal Challengers Bangalore)

=== Playoff stage ===
==== Eliminator ====
8 May	Sunrisers Hyderabad; 162/8 (20 overs)	v	Delhi Capitals; 165/8 (19.5 overs)	Delhi won by 2 wickets
19:30 (D/N) Eliminator Scorecard	Sunrisers Hyderabad; 162/8 (20 overs)	v	Delhi Capitals; 165/8 (19.5 overs)	Dr. Y. S. Rajasekhara Reddy ACA–VDCA Cricket Stadium, Visakhapatnam; Umpires: Bruce Oxenford (Aus) and Sundaram Ravi (Ind); Player of the match: Rishabh Pant (Delhi Capitals)
19:30 (D/N) Eliminator Scorecard	Martin Guptill 36 (19); Keemo Paul 3/32 (4 overs)		Prithvi Shaw 56 (38); Rashid Khan 2/15 (4 overs)	Dr. Y. S. Rajasekhara Reddy ACA–VDCA Cricket Stadium, Visakhapatnam; Umpires: Bruce Oxenford (Aus) and Sundaram Ravi (Ind); Player of the match: Rishabh Pant (Delhi Capitals)
Delhi Capitals won the toss and elected to field.				Dr. Y. S. Rajasekhara Reddy ACA–VDCA Cricket Stadium, Visakhapatnam; Umpires: Bruce Oxenford (Aus) and Sundaram Ravi (Ind); Player of the match: Rishabh Pant (Delhi Capitals)

== Statistics ==
Name	Mat	Runs	HS	Ave	SR	Wkts	BBI	Ave	Eco	Ct	St
David Warner	12	692	100*	69.20	143.86	–	–	–	–	2	–
Jonny Bairstow	10	445	114	55.62	157.24	–	–	–	–	9	2
Manish Pandey	12	344	83*	43.00	130.79	–	–	–	–	7	–
Martin Guptill	3	81	36	27.00	152.83	–	–	–	–	1	–
Kane Williamson	9	156	70*	22.28	120.00	–	–	–	–	2	–
Vijay Shankar	15	244	40*	20.33	126.42	1	1/11	70.00	8.75	10	–
Mohammad Nabi	8	115	31	19.16	151.31	8	4/11	24.25	6.65	6	–
Wriddhiman Saha	5	86	28	17.20	162.26	–	–	–	–	3	1
Yusuf Pathan	10	40	16*	13.33	88.88	0	–	–	8.00	1	–
Deepak Hooda	11	64	20	10.66	101.58	1	1/13	21.00	10.50	10	–
Shakib Al Hasan	3	9	9	9.00	90.00	2	1/26	47.50	8.76	0	–
Ricky Bhui	1	7	7	7.00	58.33	–	–	–	–	0	–
Rashid Khan	15	34	17*	6.80	147.82	17	3/21	22.17	6.28	4	–
Abhishek Sharma	3	9	5*	4.50	100.00	1	1/10	21.00	10.50	1	–
Bhuvneshwar Kumar	15	12	7*	4.00	63.15	13	2/24	35.46	7.81	4	–
Khaleel Ahmed	9	0	0	0.00	0.00	19	3/30	15.10	8.23	0	–
Siddarth Kaul	7	0	0	0.00	0.00	6	2/34	40.33	8.96	1	–
Sandeep Sharma	11	6	5*	–	200.00	12	3/19	29.33	8.25	1	–
Basil Thampi	3	1	1*	–	100.00	0	–	–	9.16	0	–
Shahbaz Nadeem	3	–	–	–	–	2	1/24	45.00	10.00	0	–

IPL Statistics Full Table on ESPNcricinfo

== Awards and achievements ==
=== Awards ===
Man of the Match

No.	Date	Player	Opponent	Venue	Result	Contribution	Ref.
1	29 March 2019	Rashid Khan	Rajasthan Royals	Hyderabad	Won by 5 wickets	15* (8) & 1/24 (4 overs)	
2	31 March 2019	Jonny Bairstow	Royal Challengers Bangalore	Hyderabad	Won by 118 runs	114 (56)	
3	4 April 2019	Jonny Bairstow	Delhi Capitals	Delhi	Won by 5 wickets	48 (28)	
4	17 April 2019	David Warner	Chennai Super Kings	Hyderabad	Won by 6 wickets	50 (25)	
5	21 April 2019	Khaleel Ahmed	Kolkata Knight Riders	Hyderabad	Won by 9 wickets	3/33 (4 overs)	
6	29 April 2019	David Warner	Kings XI Punjab	Hyderabad	Won by 41 runs	81 (56)	

Season awards

- Winner of the Orange Cap : David Warner
- Winner of 2019 Fair Play Award

=== Achievements ===
- Sunrisers recorded their highest successful run chase in the IPL (201/5) in a match against the Rajasthan Royals.
- Warner and Bairstow scored centuries in the same match and recorded the highest ever first wicket partnership in the IPL (185) while Sunrisers achieved their highest total in the IPL (231/2) in a match against the Royal Challengers Bangalore.
- Most half-centuries scored in the 2019 IPL : David Warner (8)
- Most centuries scored in the 2019 IPL : Jonny Bairstow & David Warner (1)
- Fastest century scored in the 2019 IPL : Jonny Bairstow (52 balls)
- Highest Individual score in the 2019 IPL : Jonny Bairstow (114)
- Best bowling strike rate in the 2019 IPL : Khaleel Ahmed (11.00)

== Reaction ==
David Warner was featured in the ESPNcricinfo IPL team of the season.

The Sunrisers Hyderabad announced parting their ways with Tom Moody who served as the head coach for seven seasons since the inception in 2013. The Sunrisers announced the 2019 Cricket World Cup winning coach, Trevor Bayliss, as the replacement for the 2020 season. The Sunrisers also replaced Simon Helmot with Brad Haddin as their assistant coach.

The 2019 season performances helped the IPL see its brand value jump by 13% to the estimated value of ₹47,000 crore (US$4.9 billion). The Sunrisers also saw the increase in their brand value by 4.6% to ₹483 crore (US$50 million) in 2019, according to Duff & Phelps.
