= Ramnivas Golada =

Indian cricketer (born 1994)

Personal information
- Full name: Ramnivas Shyojiram Golada
- Born: 23 October 1994 (age 32); Jaipur, Rajasthan, India
- Source: Cricinfo, 2 March 2019

Ramnivas Golada (born 23 October 1994) is an Indian cricketer. He made his Twenty20 debut for Rajasthan in the 2018–19 Syed Mushtaq Ali Trophy on 2 March 2019. He made his first-class debut on 12 February 2020, for Rajasthan in the 2019–20 Ranji Trophy.
