= Ankit Chaudhary =

Indian cricketer (born 1996)

Personal information
- Born: 21 December 1996 (age 29); Ghaziabad, Uttar Pradesh, India
- Batting: Right-handed
- Bowling: Slow left arm orthodox
- Source: ESPNcricinfo, 24 February 2019

Ankit Chaudhary (born 21 December 1996) is an Indian cricketer. He made his Twenty20 debut for Uttar Pradesh in the 2018–19 Syed Mushtaq Ali Trophy on 24 February 2019. He made his List A debut on 7 October 2019, for Uttar Pradesh in the 2019–20 Vijay Hazare Trophy.
