= Prashant Singh (cricketer) =

Indian cricketer (born 2000)

Prashant Kumar Singh
Personal information
- Born: 17 September 2000 (age 26); Chapra, Bihar, India
- Bowling: Right-arm medium
- Role: Allrounder
- Source: Cricinfo, 22 February 2019

Prashant Singh (born 17 September 2000) is an Indian cricketer. He made his Twenty20 debut for Bihar in the 2018–19 Syed Mushtaq Ali Trophy on 22 February 2019.
