= Vishal Das =

Indian cricketer (born 1989)

Personal information
- Full name: Vishal Das
- Born: 1 January 1989 (age 37)

Domestic team information
- Years: Team
- 2018-present: Bihar
- Source: Cricinfo, 20 November 2018

Vishal Das (born 1 January 1989) is an Indian cricketer. He made his first-class debut for Bihar in the 2018–19 Ranji Trophy on 20 November 2018. He made his Twenty20 debut for Bihar in the 2018–19 Syed Mushtaq Ali Trophy on 22 February 2019.
