= Yash Gardharia =

Indian cricketer (born 1996)

Personal information
- Born: 11 December 1996 (age 29)
- Source: Cricinfo, 8 March 2019

Yash Gardharia (born 11 December 1996) is an Indian cricketer. He made his Twenty20 debut for Gujarat in the 2018–19 Syed Mushtaq Ali Trophy on 8 March 2019. He made his first-class debut on 19 January 2020, for Gujarat in the 2019–20 Ranji Trophy.
