= Liam Banks =

English cricketer (born 1999)

Personal information
- Born: 3 June 1999 (age 27); Newcastle-under-Lyme, Staffordshire, England
- Batting: Right-handed
- Bowling: Right-arm off break
- Role: Batsman

Domestic team information
- Years: Team
- 2017–2020: Warwickshire (squad no. 8)
- First-class debut: 19 September 2017 Warwickshire v Yorkshire
- List A debut: 19 April 2019 Warwickshire v Yorkshire

Career statistics
| Competition | FC | LA | T20 |
|---|---|---|---|
| Matches | 10 | 8 | 6 |
| Runs scored | 277 | 250 | 34 |
| Batting average | 16.29 | 31.25 | 17.00 |
| 100s/50s | 0/1 | 0/2 | 0/0 |
| Top score | 50 | 61 | 24* |
| Balls bowled | 18 | – | – |
| Wickets | 0 | – | – |
| Bowling average | – | – | – |
| 5 wickets in innings | – | – | – |
| 10 wickets in match | – | – | – |
| Best bowling | – | – | – |
| Catches/stumpings | 15/– | 1/– | 2/– |
- Source: ESPNcricinfo, 30 September 2019

Liam Banks (born 3 June 1999) is an English cricketer. He made his first-class debut for Warwickshire in the 2017 County Championship on 19 September 2017. In December 2017, he was named in England's squad for the 2018 Under-19 Cricket World Cup. He made his List A debut on 19 April 2019, for Warwickshire in the 2019 Royal London One-Day Cup. He made his T20 debut on 21 July 2019, for Warwickshire against Leicestershire, in the 2019 t20 Blast. Banks was released by Warwickshire ahead of the 2021 County Championship.
