= Puneet Malik =

Indian cricketer (born 1991)

Personal information
- Born: 30 September 1991 (age 35)
- Source: Cricinfo, 28 February 2019

Puneet Malik (born 30 September 1991) is an Indian cricketer. He made his Twenty20 debut for Bihar in the 2018–19 Syed Mushtaq Ali Trophy on 28 February 2019.
