= Neetesh Sharma =

Indian cricketer (born 1982)

Personal information
- Born: 10 November 1982 (age 44); Shillong, Meghalaya
- Source: ESPNcricinfo, 21 February 2019

Neetesh Sharma (born 10 November 1982) is an Indian cricketer. He made his Twenty20 debut for Meghalaya in the 2018–19 Syed Mushtaq Ali Trophy on 21 February 2019.
