= Manish Sharma (cricketer, born 1996) =

Indian cricketer (born 1996)

Personal information
- Born: 6 September 1996 (age 30)
- Source: ESPNcricinfo, 21 February 2019

Manish Sharma (born 6 September 1996) is an Indian cricketer. He made his Twenty20 debut for Gujarat in the 2018–19 Syed Mushtaq Ali Trophy on 21 February 2019.
