= Gandhar Bhatawadekar =

Indian cricketer (born 1993)

Personal information
- Full name: Gandhar Vikas Bhatawadekar
- Born: 8 July 1993 (age 33)
- Batting: Right-handed
- Bowling: Right-arm offbreak
- Role: Middle order batter

Domestic team information
- Years: Team
- 2018–19: Railways
- Source: ESPNcricinfo, 30 December 2018

Gandhar Bhatawadekar (born 8 July 1993) is an Indian cricketer. He made his first-class debut for Railways in the 2018–19 Ranji Trophy on 30 December 2018. He made his Twenty20 debut for Railways in the 2018–19 Syed Mushtaq Ali Trophy on 9 March 2019.
