= Hemang Patel =

Indian cricketer (born 1998)

Personal information
- Full name: Hemang Makanbhai Patel
- Born: 20 November 1998 (age 27); Daman and Diu, India
- Source: ESPNcricinfo, 25 September 2018

Hemang Patel (born 20 November 1998) is an Indian cricketer. He made his List A debut for Gujarat in the 2018–19 Vijay Hazare Trophy on 25 September 2018. He made his Twenty20 debut for Gujarat in the 2018–19 Syed Mushtaq Ali Trophy on 21 February 2019.
