= Manjot Kalra =

Indian cricketer (born 1998)

Personal information
- Born: 15 January 1999 (age 27); Delhi, India
- Batting: Left-handed
- Bowling: Right-arm medium
- Role: Batsman

Domestic team information
- Years: Team
- 2019–2021: Delhi
- Source: ESPNcricinfo, 30 July 2019

Manjot Kalra (born 15 January 1999) is a former Indian cricketer who played for the India U-19 team. He scored a match-winning hundred, and was man-of-the-match in the final of 2018 Under-19 Cricket World Cup. In the 2018 Indian Premier League auction, he was bought by the Delhi Daredevils, though he did not play any games for them and was released by the then Delhi Capitals ahead of the 2020 IPL auction.

== Career ==
He made his Twenty20 debut for Delhi in the 2018–19 Syed Mushtaq Ali Trophy on 10 March 2019.

In June 2019, a special Investigations unit of the Delhi Police filed charges against Kalra's parents, alleging that they had falsely claimed that he had been born in 1999 to allow him to compete in junior cricket when he was over the age limit. In January 2020, he was given a one-year suspension from playing in the Ranji Trophy due to age fraud. However, a few weeks later the Delhi & District Cricket Association under a new ombudsman overturned the decision clearing him to play.

He made his List A debut on 7 March 2021, for Delhi in the 2020–21 Vijay Hazare Trophy.

== Controversy ==
On 17 July 2026, Kalra, co-owner of Lanka Premier League franchise Jaffna Kings, was arrested by the Sri Lankan Police on allegations of bribing a player for ₹9.5 million (approximately US$28,700), hours before the 2026 Lanka Premier League was due to commence.
