= Laxman Chetri =

Indian cricketer (born 1996)

Personal information
- Born: 26 January 1996 (age 30)
- Source: ESPNcricinfo, 2 March 2019

Laxman Chetri (born 26 January 1996) is an Indian cricketer. He made his Twenty20 debut for Meghalaya in the 2018–19 Syed Mushtaq Ali Trophy on 2 March 2019.
