= Vinod Singh Chhetri =

Nepalese geologist (1935–2019)

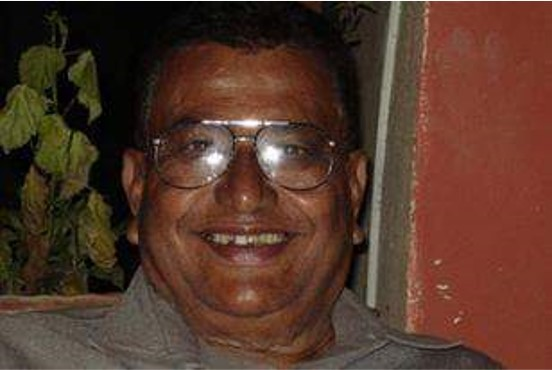
- Born: 20 December 1935
- Died: 16 April 2019 (aged 83); Lalitpur, Nepal
- Education: Nagpur University, India

Vinod Singh Chhettri (20 December 1935 – 16 April 2019) was the Former President of Nepal Geological Society of 4th Executive Committee, Founder President of Stratigraphic Association of Nepal (1999–2010) and the Retired Gazetted 1st class officer of Department of Mines and Geology, Nepal.

== Early life and family ==
Vinod Singh Chhettri, son of Indra Mani Singh and Bimala Singh was born on 20 December 1935 in India. His father died when he was 2 years old. His mother was teacher of Annie Besant College of Rajghat, Banaras and has completed B.A., B.T., from Banaras Hindu University, India. He was a champion in Swimming, he could swim across the Ganga river of Banaras when he was 12 years old. He came to Nepal when he was 12 years old with the team of Dr. Ishwori Prasad Upadhyaya, famous Indian historian, in which his mother was a member of the team. The Rana Prime Minister of Nepal, Juddha Shumsher Jung Bahadur Rana, called the team of Ishwori Prasad in Nepal for preparing his biography, which was later published in 1975

He married Sarala Singh and they had 4 daughters and 1 son.

== Career ==
Served in the Ministry of Industry Department of Mines & Geology from 1963 till 1987 throughout and the last position was Superintendent Geologist Gazetted 1st class post of His Majesty's Government of Nepal and by virtue of having served in almost every branch of applied geology; done geological mapping and mineral exploration in many parts of Nepal and specific field of research is related with geological hazards such as earthquake of July 1980 of western Nepal. Study of landslide of and gully erosion for Doti-Dipayal Town Planning Project, soil testing of a paper millsite. Feasibility study of Sunkoshi River. Study of Land Subsidence of Pokhara and many small Hydel Projects etc.

== Academic honours ==
- 2018- Life Time Achievement Award of Nepal Geological Society honored by Rt Hon'ble Vice-President of Nepal

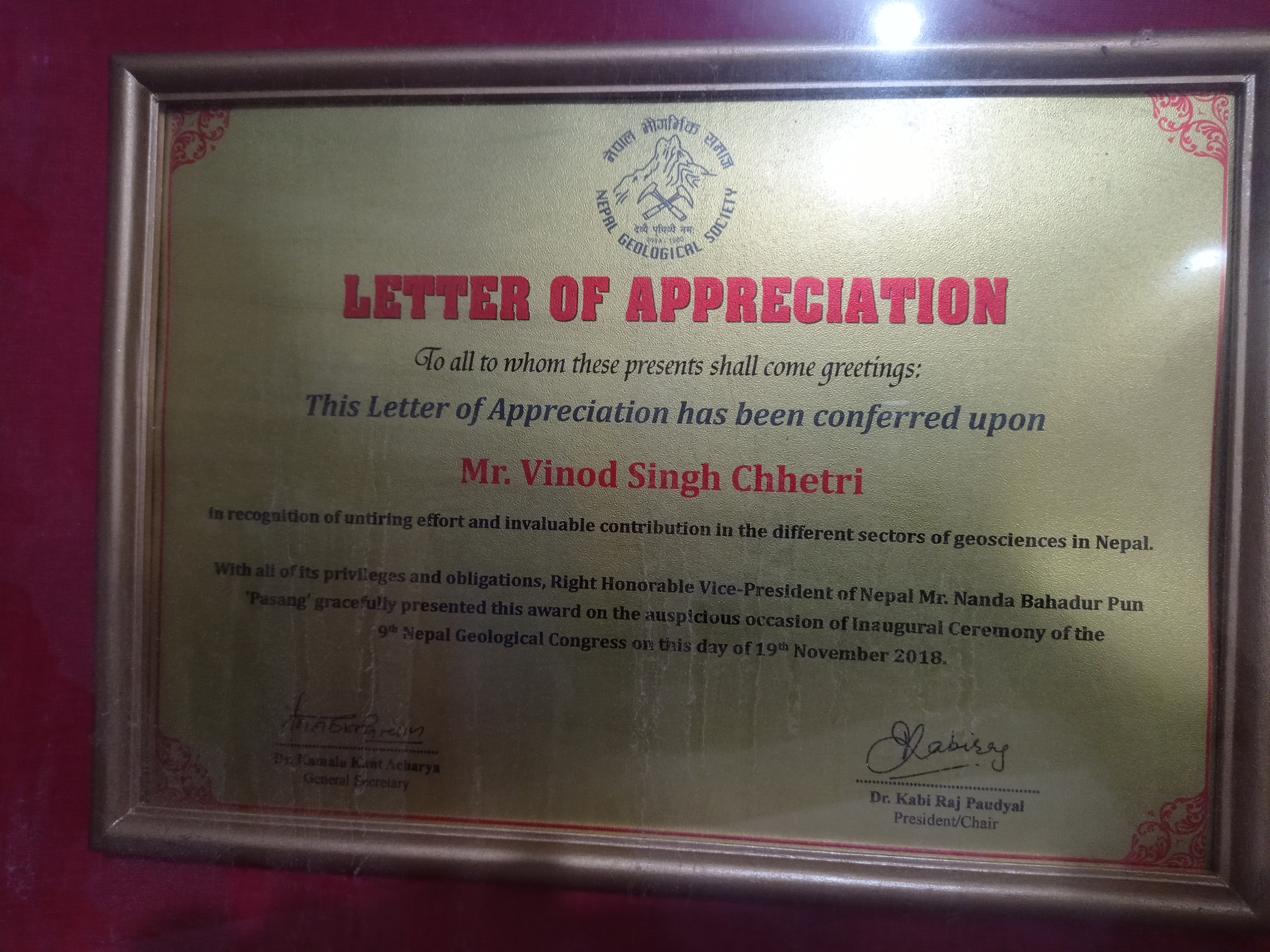
Life Time Achievement Award to Mr. Vinod Singh Chhettri by Rt. Hon'ble Vice-President of Nepal
