= Divyang Hinganekar =

Indian cricketer (born 1993)

Personal information
- Born: 14 October 1993 (age 33)
- Batting: Right handed
- Bowling: Left arm medium

Domestic team information
- Years: Team
- 2017–18: Maharashtra
- Source: ESPNcricinfo, 22 February 2019

Divyang Hinganekar (born 14 October 1993) is an Indian cricketer. He made his List A debut for Maharashtra in the 2017–18 Vijay Hazare Trophy on 15 February 2018. He made his first-class debut on 17 February 2022, for Maharashtra in the 2021–22 Ranji Trophy.
