= Piyush Tanwar =

Indian cricketer (born 1991)

Personal information
- Born: 8 October 1991 (age 35)
- Source: Cricinfo, 27 February 2019

Piyush Tanwar (born 8 October 1991) is an Indian cricketer. He made his Twenty20 debut for Gujarat in the 2018–19 Syed Mushtaq Ali Trophy on 27 February 2019.
