= Rushabh Rathod =

Indian cricketer (born 1994)

Personal information
- Born: 25 July 1994 (age 32); Pune, India
- Source: ESPNcricinfo, 25 February 2017

Rushabh Rathod (born 25 July 1994) is an Indian cricketer. He made his List A debut for Vidarbha in the 2016–17 Vijay Hazare Trophy on 25 February 2017. He made his Twenty20 debut for Vidarbha in the 2018–19 Syed Mushtaq Ali Trophy on 27 February 2019.
