= Khaleel Ahmed =

Indian cricketer

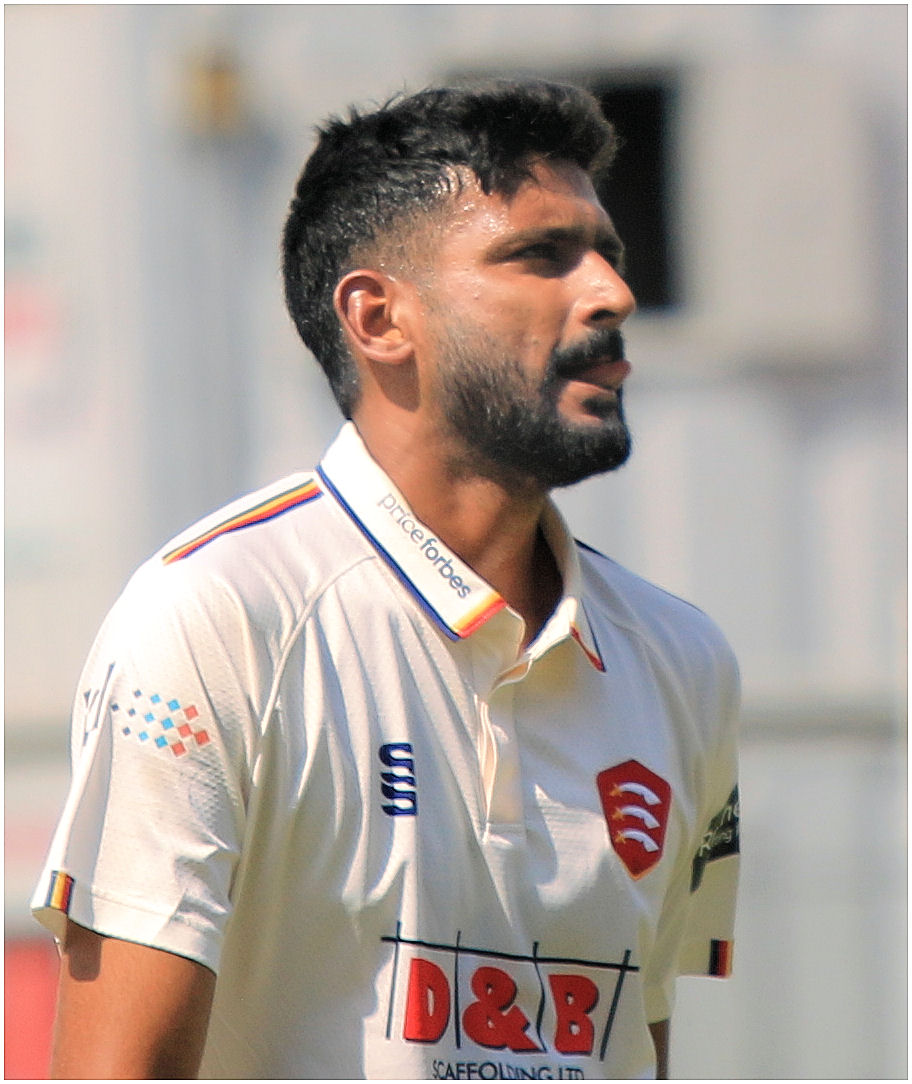
- Ahmed in 2025, playing for Essex

Personal information
- Full name: Khaleel Khursheed Ahmed
- Born: 5 December 1997 (age 28); Tonk, India
- Height: 1.86 m (6 ft 1 in)
- Batting: Right-handed
- Bowling: Left-arm fast medium
- Role: Bowler

International information
- National side: India (2018–present)
- ODI debut (cap 222): 18 September 2018 v Hong Kong
- Last ODI: 14 August 2019 v West Indies
- T20I debut (cap 77): 4 November 2018 v West Indies
- Last T20I: 30 July 2024 v Sri Lanka

Domestic team information
- Years: Team
- 2016–present: Rajasthan
- 2018–2021, 2027: Sunrisers Hyderabad
- 2022-2024: Delhi Capitals
- 2025–2026: Chennai Super Kings
- 2025: Essex

Career statistics
Competition	ODI	T20I	FC	LA
Matches	11	18	22	63
Runs scored	9	1	111	44
Batting average	4.50	–	7.40	3.66
100s/50s	0/0	0/0	0/0	0/0
Top score	5	1*	18*	15
Balls bowled	480	396	3,264	3,014
Wickets	15	16	60	92
Bowling average	31.00	35.12	30.13	27.92
5 wickets in innings	0	0	1	0
10 wickets in match	0	0	0	0
Best bowling	3/13	2/27	5/37	4/35
Catches/stumpings	1/–	4/–	4/–	10/–
Medal record
Men's Cricket
Representing India
ACC Asia Cup
Winner	2018 United Arab Emirates
ICC Under-19 Cricket World Cup
Runner-up	2016 Bangladesh
- Source: ESPNcricinfo, 26 July 2025

Khaleel Khursheed Ahmed (Hindi: [xʌˈliːl xuːɾˈʃiːd̪ ˈɛɦmʌd̪]; born 5 December 1997) is an Indian international cricketer. He made his debut for Indian cricket team in September 2018. He plays for Rajasthan in domestic cricket and currently for Sunrisers Hyderabad in the Indian Premier League. He was a part of the Indian squad which won the 2018 Asia Cup.

== Early life and background ==
Khaleel's father was Khursheed Ahmed, a nurse in a village near the small town of Tonk. His parents wanted him to become a doctor and were reluctant to let him join a cricket academy.

== Domestic career ==
He made his Twenty20 debut for Rajasthan in the 2016–17 Inter State Twenty-20 Tournament on 5 February 2017. Prior to his Twenty20 debut, he was part of India's squad for the 2016 Under-19 Cricket World Cup. He made his first-class debut for Rajasthan in the 2017–18 Ranji Trophy on 6 October 2017.

In January 2018, he was bought by the Sunrisers Hyderabad in the 2018 IPL auction for Rs. 3 crores.

He made his List A debut for Rajasthan in the 2017–18 Vijay Hazare Trophy on 5 February 2018. In February 2022, he was bought by the Delhi Capitals in the auction for the 2022 Indian Premier League tournament. In November 2024, he was bought by the Chennai Super Kings in the auction for the 2025 Indian Premier League.

== English County Cricket ==
In June 2025, Ahmed joined Essex County Cricket Club as an overseas player for the final three months of that year's English season.

== International career ==
In September 2018, he was named in India's One Day International (ODI) squad for the 2018 Asia Cup. He made his ODI debut for India against Hong Kong on 18 September 2018.

In October 2018, he was named in India's Twenty20 International (T20I) squad for their series against the West Indies. He made his (T20I) debut for India against the West Indies on 4 November 2018.

In May 2024, he was named as a reserve player in India's squad for the 2024 ICC Men's T20 World Cup tournament.
