= 2018–19 Syed Mushtaq Ali Trophy =

Indian cricket tournament

- Dates: 21 February 2019 – 14 March 2019
- Administrator(s): BCCI
- Cricket format: T20
- Tournament format(s): Round robin, then knockout
- Champions: Karnataka (1st title)
- Participants: 37
- Most runs: Rohan Kadam (536) (Karnataka)
- Most wickets: Satyajeet Bachhav (20) (Maharashtra)
- Official website: http://www.bcci.tv

The 2018–19 Syed Mushtaq Ali Trophy was the eleventh edition of the Syed Mushtaq Ali Trophy, an annual Twenty20 tournament in India. Played from 24 March to 7 April 2015, it was contested by 37 Ranji Trophy teams, including the nine expansion teams who were introduced that season. Delhi were the defending champions. Karnataka won the 2018–19 championship, their first title.

The tournament had five groups, with three groups containing seven teams and two groups with eight teams. The top two teams in each group qualified for the Super League section of the tournament, with the teams split into two further groups of five teams. The top two teams, one from each of the Super League groups, progressed to the final.

In the opening round fixture between Mumbai and Sikkim, Mumbai's Shreyas Iyer scored 147 runs, the highest total by an Indian batsman in a T20 match. The second round saw Andhra beat Nagaland by 179 runs, the biggest winning margin by runs in a T20 match.

Jharkhand and Delhi from Group A, Vidarbha and Gujarat from Group B, Railways and Mumbai from Group C, Karnataka and Bengal from Group D, and Maharashtra and Uttar Pradesh from Group E all progressed to the Super League phase of the tournament.

In the Super League stage of the tournament, Maharashtra won Group A and Karnataka won Group B to advance to the final. With their win in their final Super League match, Karnataka won a total of thirteen consecutive T20 matches, a record for an Indian state team. Karnataka won the tournament, after beating Maharashtra by eight wickets in the final. With the victory, Karnataka equalled the record for a winning streak for an India-based team with fourteen matches, tied with the Kolkata Knight Riders.

== League stage ==
=== Group A ===
Team	Pld	W	L	T	NR	Pts	NRR
Jharkhand	6	5	1	0	0	20	+1.838
Delhi	6	5	1	0	0	20	+1.604
Kerala	6	4	2	0	0	16	+1.920
Andhra (H)	6	3	3	0	0	12	+1.832
Jammu & Kashmir	6	3	3	0	0	12	-0.410
Manipur	6	1	5	0	0	4	–3.244
Nagaland	6	0	6	0	0	0	–3.876

- Top two teams advanced to the Super League.

(H)- Host

=== Group B ===
Team	Pld	W	L	T	NR	Pts	NRR
Vidarbha	6	5	1	0	0	20	+1.083
Gujarat (H)	6	4	2	0	0	16	+1.280
Himachal Pradesh	6	4	2	0	0	16	+0.705
Tamil Nadu	6	4	2	0	0	16	+0.397
Rajasthan	6	3	3	0	0	12	+0.758
Bihar	6	1	5	0	0	4	–1.877
Meghalaya	6	0	6	0	0	0	–2.311

- Top two teams advances to the Super League.

(H)- Host

=== Group C ===
Team	Pld	W	L	T	NR	Pts	NRR
Railways	6	5	1	0	0	20	+1.256
Mumbai	6	5	1	0	0	20	+1.590
Saurashtra	6	4	2	0	0	16	+1.241
Madhya Pradesh (H)	6	3	3	0	0	12	+0.179
Punjab	6	3	3	0	0	12	+0.590
Goa	6	1	5	0	0	4	–0.802
Sikkim	6	0	6	0	0	0	–4.466

- Top two teams advanced to the Super League.

(H)- Host

=== Group D ===
Team	Pld	W	L	T	NR	Pts	NRR
Karnataka	7	7	0	0	0	28	+2.959
Bengal	7	5	2	0	0	20	+2.259
Chhattisgarh	7	4	3	0	0	16	+1.539
Assam	7	4	3	0	0	16	+1.400
Haryana	7	4	3	0	0	16	+0.881
Odisha (H)	7	3	4	0	0	12	–0.157
Arunachal Pradesh	7	1	6	0	0	4	–3.885
Mizoram	7	0	7	0	0	0	–5.371

- Top two teams advances to the Super League.

(H)- Host

=== Group E ===
Team	Pld	W	L	T	NR	Pts	NRR
Maharashtra	7	5	1	0	1	22	+1.249
Uttar Pradesh	7	5	1	0	1	22	+2.154
Uttarakhand	7	4	2	0	1	18	–1.287
Services (H)	7	4	2	0	1	18	+0.529
Baroda	7	3	3	0	1	14	–0.059
Hyderabad	7	1	5	0	1	6	–0.182
Pondicherry	7	1	5	0	1	6	–1.238
Tripura	7	1	5	0	1	6	–1.265

- Top two teams advances to the Super League.

(H) - Host

== Super League ==
=== Points table ===
Group A

Team	P	W	L	T	NR	Pts	NRR
Maharashtra (E1)	4	4	0	0	0	16	+0.826
Bengal (D2)	4	3	1	0	0	12	+0.827
Jharkhand (A1)	4	2	2	0	0	8	–0.786
Gujarat (B2)	4	1	3	0	0	4	+0.262
Railways (C1)	4	0	4	0	0	0	–1.175

- Top team from the group advances to the final.

Group B

Team	P	W	L	T	NR	Pts	NRR
Karnataka (D1)	4	4	0	0	0	16	+1.283
Mumbai (C2)	4	3	1	0	0	12	+0.544
Vidarbha (B1)	4	2	2	0	0	8	+0.756
Delhi (A2)	4	1	3	0	0	4	–1.698
Uttar Pradesh (E2)	4	0	4	0	0	0	–0.882

- Top team from the group advances to the final.

=== Group A ===
8 March 2019
Scorecard

Jharkhand; 148/7 (18 overs)	v	Gujarat; 147/8 (18 overs)
Anand Singh 45 (36); Hemang Patel 1/6 (1 over)		Karan Patel 38 (26); Utkarsh Singh 2/22 (4 over)

Jharkhand won by 1 run
Emerald High School Ground, Indore
Umpires: Saiyed Khalid and Krishnamachari Srinivasan

- Gujarat won the toss and elected to field.
- The match was reduced to 18 overs per side due to rain.
- Supriyo Chakraborty (Jharkhand) and Yash Gardharia (Gujarat) both made their T20 debuts.

8 March 2019
Scorecard

Railways; 142/6 (20 overs)	v	Bengal; 143/4 (18.1 overs)
Ashish Yadav 51 (44); Sayan Ghosh 2/26 (4 overs)		Shreevats Goswami 80 (55); Ashish Yadav 2/20 (4 overs)

Bengal won by 6 wickets
Emerald High School Ground, Indore
Umpires: Saiyed Khalid and Krishnamachari Srinivasan

- Railways won the toss and elected to bat.

9 March 2019
Scorecard

Bengal; 138/7 (20 overs)	v	Maharashtra; 139/3 (17.1 overs)
Shahbaz Ahmed 60* (44); Domnic Muthuswami 3/15 (4 overs)		Rahul Tripathi 60* (46); Akash Deep 2/21 (4 overs)

Maharashtra won by 7 wickets
Emerald High School Ground, Indore
Umpires: Saiyed Khalid and Krishnamachari Srinivasan

- Maharashtra won the toss and elected to field.
- Akash Deep (Bengal) made his T20 debut.

9 March 2019
Scorecard

Railways; 135/8 (20 overs)	v	Jharkhand; 136/5 (19 overs)
Pratham Singh 41 (39); Rahul Shukla 2/19 (4 overs)		Anand Singh 53 (39); Harsh Tyagi 2/25 (4 overs)

Jharkhand won by 5 wickets
Holkar Stadium, Indore
Umpires: Yeshwant Barde and Virender Sharma

- Jharkhand won the toss and elected to field.
- Gandhar Bhatawadekar (Railways) made his T20 debut.

10 March 2019
Scorecard

Jharkhand; 126/9 (20 overs)	v	Bengal; 127/2 (13 overs)
Anukul Roy 37* (25); Writtick Chatterjee 3/12 (4 overs)		Shreevats Goswami 86* (50); Varun Aaron 2/24 (3 overs)

Bengal won by 8 wickets
Holkar Stadium, Indore
Umpires: Virender Sharma and Krishnamachari Srinivasan

- Bengal won the toss and elected to field.

10 March 2019
Scorecard

Gujarat; 143/8 (20 overs)	v	Maharashtra; 144/6 (19.5 overs)
Chirag Gandhi 35 (40); Divyang Hinganekar 2/23 (4 overs)		Azim Kazi 39* (29); Hemang Patel 2/14 (2 overs)

Maharashtra won by 4 wickets
Holkar Stadium, Indore
Umpires: Yeshwant Barde and Krishnamachari Srinivasan

- Gujarat won the toss and elected to bat.

11 March 2019
Scorecard

Railways; 110/9 (20 overs)	v	Gujarat; 112/3 (14.1 overs)
Harsh Tyagi 32* (34); Piyush Chawla 3/12 (4 overs)		Piyush Tanwar 55* (43); Ambikeshwar Mishra 1/15 (3 overs)

Gujarat won by 7 wickets
Emerald High School Ground, Indore
Umpires: Anil Dandekar and Rohan Pandit

- Railways won the toss and elected to bat.
- Ambikeshwar Mishra (Railways) made his T20 debut.

11 March 2019
Scorecard

Maharashtra; 153/4 (20 overs)	v	Jharkhand; 139/8 (20 overs)
Ankit Bawne 64* (46); Varun Aaron 2/22 (4 overs)		Vikash Singh 46* (29); Satyajeet Bachhav 3/17 (4 overs)

Maharashtra won by 14 runs
Emerald High School Ground, Indore
Umpires: Anil Dandekar and Rohan Pandit

- Maharashtra won the toss and elected to bat.

12 March 2019
Scorecard

Maharashtra; 177/5 (20 overs)	v	Railways; 156 (20 overs)
Nikhil Naik 95* (58); Manjeet Singh 2/36 (4 overs)		Mrunal Devdhar 55 (44); Samad Fallah 3/37 (4 overs)

Maharashtra won by 21 runs
Holkar Stadium, Indore
Umpires: Anil Dandekar and Rohan Pandit

- Railways won the toss and elected to field.

12 March 2019
Scorecard

Gujarat; 121 (19.3 overs)	v	Bengal; 125/3 (18.2 overs)
Axar Patel 53 (44); Sayan Ghosh 5/15 (3.3 overs)		Wriddhiman Saha 53* (47); Jayveer Parmar 2/26 (4 overs)

Bengal won by 7 wickets
Holkar Stadium, Indore
Umpires: Anil Dandekar and Chettithody Shamshuddin

- Gujarat won the toss and elected to bat.

=== Group B ===
8 March 2019
Scorecard

Delhi; 83 (16.2 overs)	v	Vidarbha; 88/1 (8.3 overs)
Hiten Dalal 42 (34); Umesh Yadav 2/10 (2.2 overs)		Jitesh Sharma 41 (24); Suboth Bhati 1/20 (2 overs)

Vidarbha won by 9 wickets
Holkar Stadium, Indore
Umpires: Yeshwant Barde and Virender Sharma

- Vidarbha won the toss and elected to field.

8 March 2019
Scorecard

Mumbai; 97/9 (20 overs)	v	Karnataka; 98/1 (13.2 overs)
Akash Parkar 22 (32); Manoj Bhandage 2/11 (2 overs)		Rohan Kadam 62* (45); Siddhesh Lad 1/12 (3 overs)

Karnataka won by 9 wickets
Holkar Stadium, Indore
Umpires: K. N. Ananthapadmanabhan and Virender Sharma

- Mumbai won the toss and elected to bat.

9 March 2019
Scorecard

Delhi; 144/7 (20 overs)	v	Mumbai; 148/2 (19 overs)
Lalit Yadav 33 (23); Tushar Deshpande 4/19 (4 overs)		Shreyas Iyer 53* (47); Nitish Rana 1/7 (1 over)

Mumbai won by 8 wickets
Emerald High School Ground, Indore
Umpires: Saiyed Khalid and Krishnamachari Srinivasan

- Mumbai won the toss and elected to field.

9 March 2019
Scorecard

Karnataka; 149/6 (20 overs)	v	Uttar Pradesh; 139/8 (20 overs)
Rohan Kadam 35 (30); Ankit Chaudhary 1/26 (4 overs)		Akshdeep Nath 46 (41); V Koushik 3/22 (4 overs)

Karnataka won by 10 runs
Holkar Stadium, Indore
Umpires: K. N. Ananthapadmanabhan and Yeshwant Barde

- Uttar Pradesh won the toss and elected to field.

10 March 2019
Scorecard

Delhi; 109/9 (20 overs)	v	Karnataka; 112/2 (15.3 overs)
Nitish Rana 37 (29); V Koushik 4/19 (4 overs)		Mayank Agarwal 43* (47); Navdeep Saini 1/21 (3 overs)

Karnataka won by 8 wickets
Emerald High School Ground, Indore
Umpires: K. N. Ananthapadmanabhan and Saiyed Khalid

- Karnataka won the toss and elected to field.
- Manjot Kalra (Delhi) made his T20 debut.

10 March 2019
Scorecard

Vidarbha; 143/7 (20 overs)	v	Uttar Pradesh; 133/9 (20 overs)
Atharva Taide 41 (37); Ankit Chaudhary 2/28 (4 overs)		Samarth Singh 39 (39); Shrikant Wagh 2/24 (3.5 overs)

Vidarbha won by 10 runs
Emerald High School Ground, Indore
Umpires: K. N. Ananthapadmanabhan and Saiyed Khalid

- Uttar Pradesh won the toss and elected to field.

11 March 2019
Scorecard

Vidarbha; 137/8 (20 overs)	v	Mumbai; 138/4 (15.4 overs)
Rushabh Rathod 26 (21); Tushar Deshpande 3/38 (4 overs)		Jay Bista 73* (51); Ravi Jangid 2/23 (4 overs)

Mumbai won by 6 wickets
Holkar Stadium, Indore
Umpires: Chettithody Shamshuddin and Sanjay Hazare

- Mumbai won the toss and elected to field.

11 March 2019
Scorecard

Uttar Pradesh; 140/6 (20 overs)	v	Delhi; 142/6 (19.4 overs)
Priyam Garg 30 (19); Pawan Negi 3/9 (3 overs)		Dhruv Shorey 62* (48); Ankit Rajpoot 2/20 (3.4 overs)

Delhi won by 4 wickets
Holkar Stadium, Indore
Umpires: Chettithody Shamshuddin and Nitin Menon

- Uttar Pradesh won the toss and elected to bat.

12 March 2019
Scorecard

Mumbai; 183/7 (20 overs)	v	Uttar Pradesh; 137 (19 overs)
Siddhesh Lad 62 (44); Ankit Rajpoot 3/47 (4 overs)		Saurabh Kumar 24 (15); Shardul Thakur 3/15 (4 overs)

Mumbai won by 46 runs
Emerald High School Ground, Indore
Umpires: Sanjay Hazare and Nitin Menon

- Uttar Pradesh won the toss and elected to field.
- Madhav Kaushik (Uttar Pradesh) made his T20 debut.

12 March 2019
Scorecard

Vidarbha; 138/7 (20 overs)	v	Karnataka; 140/4 (19.2 overs)
Apoorv Wankhade 56* (41); Vinay Kumar 2/27 (4 overs)		Manish Pandey 49* (35); Yash Thakur 1/18 (3 overs)

Karnataka won by 6 wickets
Emerald High School Ground, Indore
Umpires: Sanjay Hazare and Nitin Menon

- Karnataka won the toss and elected to field.

== Final ==
14 March 2019
Scorecard

Maharashtra; 155/4 (20 overs)	v	Karnataka; 159/2 (18.3 overs)
Naushad Shaikh 69* (41); Abhimanyu Mithun 2/24 (4 overs)		Mayank Agarwal 85* (57); Divyang Hinganekar 1/21 (3.3 overs)

Karnataka won by 8 wickets
Holkar Stadium, Indore
Umpires: Chettithody Shamshuddin and Nitin Menon
Player of the match: Mayank Agarwal (Karnataka)

- Karnataka won the toss and elected to field.
