= Chennai Super Kings–Mumbai Indians rivalry =

Rivalry between two Indian cricket teams

Clash of Champions
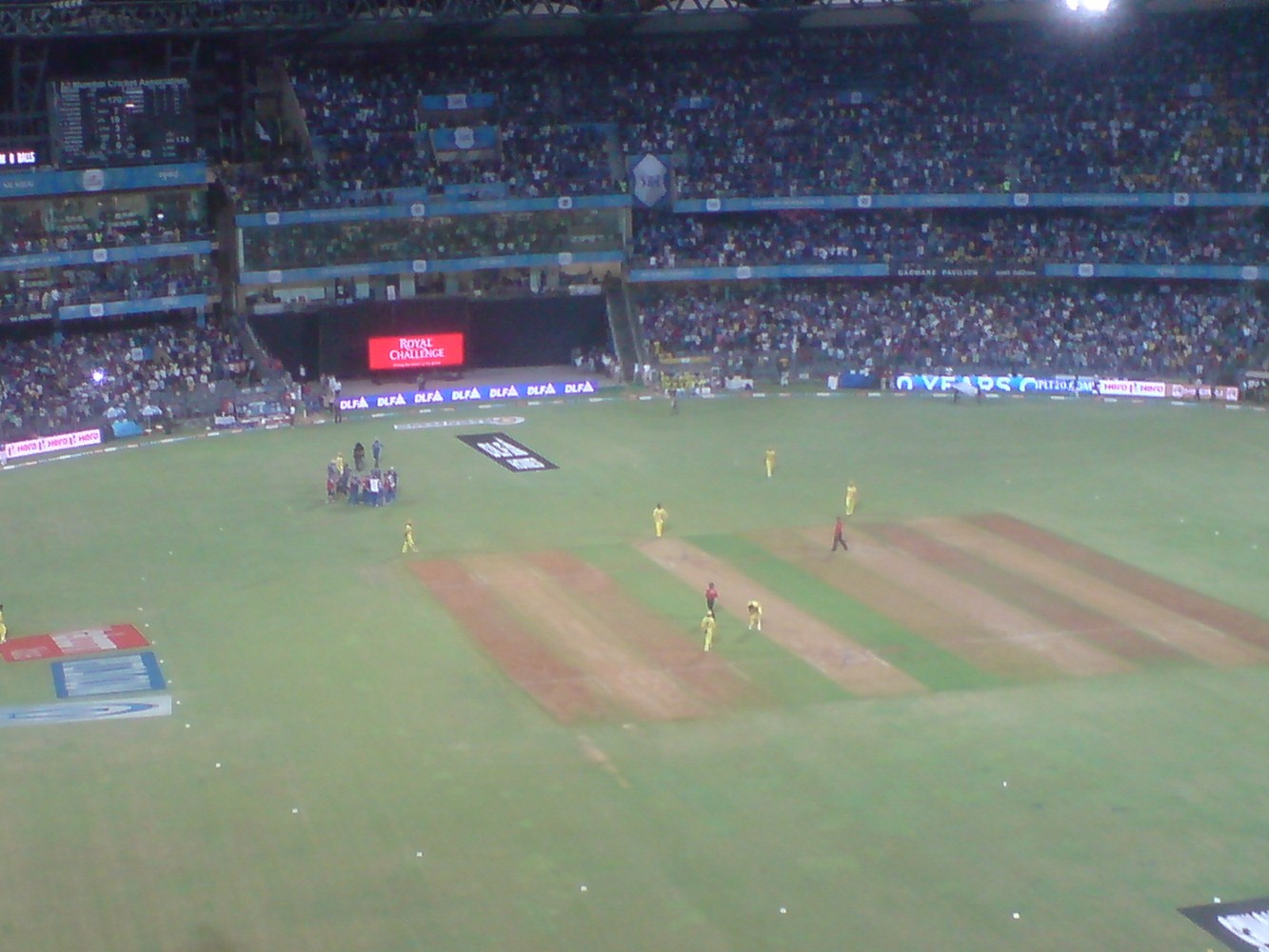
- A 2012 IPL match between Mumbai and Chennai at Wankhede Stadium, Mumbai
- Sport: Cricket
- Location: Chennai, Tamil Nadu (Chennai Super Kings); Mumbai, Maharashtra (Mumbai Indians)
- Teams: Chennai Super Kings (CSK); Mumbai Indians (MI)
- First meeting: 24 April 2008; CSK won by 6 runs
- Latest meeting: 2 May 2026; CSK won by 8 wickets
- Next meeting: 2027 (expected)
- Broadcasters: Sony Max (2008–2017); Star Sports (2018-present) (Television Rights); JioHotstar (2018–2022, 2025-present) (Digital Rights); JioCinema (2023–2024) (Digital Rights)
- Stadiums: M. A. Chidambaram Stadium (Chennai); Wankhede Stadium (Mumbai)
- Trophy: CSK: 7 5 IPL 2 CLT20; MI: 7 5 IPL 2 CLT20

Statistics
- Total meetings: Total Matches: 43; IPL: 41; CLT20: 2
- Most wins: Mumbai Indians (22 wins)
- Most player appearances: (India) MS Dhoni (37)
- Top scorer: Runs: (India) Rohit Sharma (913) for MI (India) Suresh Raina (736) for CSK; Wickets: (Sri Lanka) Lasith Malinga (37) for MI (Cricket West Indies) Dwayne Bravo (37) for MI and CSK
- All-time series (IPL & CLT20 only): MI: 22 wins (IPL:21 & CLT20:1); CSK: 21 wins (IPL:20 & CLT20:1)
- Largest victory: By runs: CSK wins by 103 runs Wankhede Stadium (23 April 2026); By wickets: MI wins by 10 wickets Sharjah Cricket Stadium (23 October 2020)
- Longest win streak: 5 Mumbai Indians (28 April 2018 to 19 September 2020)
- Current win streak: 2 Chennai Super Kings (23 April 2026–present)
- Location of the two teams in India

The Chennai Super Kings–Mumbai Indians rivalry, is a cricket rivalry between two franchises, Chennai Super Kings (CSK) and Mumbai Indians (MI) in the Indian Premier League (IPL) and the defunct Champions League Twenty20 (CLT20). The two teams have played each other 41 times in IPL and 2 times in CLT20 which is the most number of times any two IPL teams have faced off each other, with the MI having more victories with 22, while CSK have won 21 matches.

Mumbai and Chennai are two of the biggest metropolitan cities in India, being the largest ones in western and eastern coast respectively. They are also the capital cities of the two largest states in India by GDP, Maharashtra and Tamil Nadu. They are the two most successful teams in IPL winning a combined 10 titles out of the 18, with 5 titles each. The two sides are known to have a large fan following across the country.

The highest run scorers from these fixtures are Rohit Sharma (MI) with 913 runs in 30 innings with 1 century, and Suresh Raina (CSK) with 736 runs in 32 outings.

== History ==
Chennai Super Kings and Mumbai Indians have historically engaged in some of the most iconic clashes in the IPL, including four times in the final.

=== 2008–2009: First seasons ===
The spark for the CSK-MI rivalry was lit at their first IPL meeting. A stacked CSK batting order fired to rack up a massive 208 for five in its first game at the M. A. Chidambaram Stadium in Chepauk. Opener Matthew Hayden's belligerent 46-ball 81 set the base before Suresh Raina's fifty (53) and skipper MS Dhoni's 16-ball 30 cameo put MI under pressure. Mumbai, however, threatened to chase down the target with contributions through the order but none could capitalise to play a match-defining knock. MI required 19 to win in the final over, but only managed 12 as CSK eked out the visitor by six runs.

=== 2010, 2013, 2015, 2019: Finals ===
==== 2010 Finals ====
Mumbai Indians qualified for the final for first time in their Indian Premier League history while it was the second time for Chennai Super Kings in three years. Super Kings qualified for the final at 2008 Indian Premier League where they lost to Rajasthan Royals by three wickets in a last ball thriller. In the 2010 IPL final Super Kings faced the tournament favourites Mumbai Indians at their home ground in the final. Suresh Raina's 57 (35) helped the Super Kings recover from 68/3 after 12 overs to put up 168/5 at the end of their 20 overs. Then, their spin duo of Ravichandran Ashwin and Muralitharan conceded only 41 runs in the 8 overs bowled between them to help the Super Kings won the game by 22 runs and secure their first ever IPL title. With this, the Super Kings also qualified for the 2010 Champions League Twenty20 that was held in South Africa.

==== 2013 Finals ====
In the first Qualifier at Delhi against Mumbai Indians, the Super Kings posted 192/1 in 20 overs riding on unbeaten half-centuries from Hussey (86* off 58 balls) and Raina (82* off 42 balls) before bowling out their opponents for 144. Thus they entered the final of the IPL for the fourth time in succession where they would play the same opponents, Mumbai Indians, at Kolkata. At the final, batting first, the Mumbai Indians made 148/9 in their 20 overs. In reply, the Super Kings were reduced to 39/6 at one stage before an unbeaten half-century from skipper Dhoni took them close to the target. However, Mumbai Indians won the match by 23 runs to win their first ever IPL title.

==== 2015 Finals ====
It was the third time these two teams met in the final, having previously played each other in the 2010 and 2013 finals. Mumbai defeated Chennai by 41 runs to win their second IPL title, playing in their third IPL final. Their previous IPL victory had come at the same venue against the same opposition in 2013. Chennai were playing their sixth IPL final, attempting to win their third title. Mumbai captain Rohit Sharma was awarded man of the match for his innings of 50. The final was sold out, with a final attendance of around 67,000 people.

==== 2019 Finals ====
Mumbai Indians won the title for the fourth time by defeating Chennai Super Kings by 1 run in the 2019 Indian Premier League Final. Mumbai Indians became the most successful team of IPL by winning their fourth title, while Chennai Super Kings was second with three titles. Mumbai Indians scored 149 runs in the final match played at the Rajiv Gandhi International Cricket Stadium in Hyderabad. Chennai Super Kings managed to score 148 runs for 7 wickets in 20 overs, with the final ball resulting in a run-out. Shane Watson batted through a bleeding knee injury—requiring six stitches after the match—to score 80 off of 59 balls, with 8 fours and 4 sixes. Jasprit Bumrah was awarded Player of the Match.

== Summary of Results ==
- **Bold** indicates most wins.

Teams	Total wins	In Chennai	In Mumbai	Neutral Venue
**Mumbai Indians**	**22**	6	9	7
**Chennai Super Kings**	**21**	5	9	7
Total Matches	43	11	18	14
Last Updated: 2 May 2026

=== Head-to-Head Fixtures ===
Seasons	Total Matches	Mumbai won	Chennai won
2008 IPL	2	1	1
2009 IPL	2	1	1
2010 IPL	3	1	2
2011 IPL	1	1	0
2011 CLT20	1	1	0
2012 IPL	3	2	1
2012 CLT20	1	0	1
2013 IPL	4	3	1
2014 IPL	3	0	3
2015 IPL	4	3	1
2018 IPL	2	1	1
2019 IPL	4	4	0
2020 IPL	2	1	1
2021 IPL	2	1	1
2022 IPL	2	1	1
2023 IPL	2	0	2
2024 IPL	1	0	1
2025 IPL	2	1	1
2026 IPL	2	0	2
Total	43	22	21

=== Head-to-head points table ranking in IPL (2008–2026) ===
Sns. Pos.	08	09	10	11	12	13	14	15	18	19	20	21	22	23	24	25	26
1			**1**			**1**		**1**		**1**	**1**						
2		**2**		**2**		**2**		**2**	**2**	**2**		**2**		**2**			
3	**3**		**3**	**3**	**3**		**3**										
4					**4**		**4**							**4**		**4**	
5	**5**								**5**			**5**			**5**		
6																	
7		**7**									**7**						
8																	**8**
9													**9**				**9**
10													**10**		**10**	**10**	

- Indicates qualified for playoffs
- Chennai Super Kings
- Mumbai Indians
- Total: Chennai Super Kings with **13** higher finishes, Mumbai Indians with **5** higher finishes (as of the end of the 2026 IPL).
- The biggest difference in positions for Chennai Super Kings from Mumbai Indians is **5** places (2009 IPL & 2024 IPL). The biggest difference in positions for Mumbai Indians from Chennai Super Kings is **6** places (2020 IPL & 2025 IPL).
- There were no head-to-head clashes between the Chennai Super Kings and the Mumbai Indians in the 2016 and 2017 seasons due to the suspension of CSK for those two seasons.

== Summary of Championships ==
=== Most IPL Titles ===
Team	Title(s)	Runner-up	Seasons Won	Seasons Runner-up
Chennai Super Kings	5	5	2010, 2011, 2018, 2021, 2023	2008, 2012, 2013, 2015, 2019
Mumbai Indians	5	1	2013, 2015, 2017, 2019, 2020	2010
Last Updated: 30 May 2023

=== Most Champions League T20 Titles ===
Team	Title(s)	Runner-up	Seasons Won	Seasons Runner-up	No. of seasons played
Chennai Super Kings	2	0	2010, 2014	-	5
Mumbai Indians	2	0	2011, 2013	-	5
Last Updated: 4 October 2014

=== Performance in Indian Premier League ===
Year	Chennai Super Kings	Mumbai Indians
2008	Runners-up	League stage
2009	Semi-finalists	League stage
2010	Champions	Runners-up
2011	Champions	Playoffs
2012	Runners-up	Playoffs
2013	Runners-up	Champions
2014	Playoffs	Playoffs
2015	Runners-up	Champions
2016	Suspended	League stage
2017	Suspended	Champions
2018	Champions	League stage
2019	Runners-up	Champions
2020	League stage	Champions
2021	Champions	League stage
2022	League Stage	League stage
2023	Champions	Playoffs
2024	League stage	League stage
2025	League stage	Playoffs

=== Performance in Champions League T20 ===
Year	Chennai Super Kings	Mumbai Indians
2010	Champions	League Stage
2011	League Stage	Champions
2012	League Stage	League Stage
2013	Semi-finalists	Champions
2014	Champions	Qualifiers

== Meetings in IPL ==
- **Bold** indicates most wins.

Head To Head in IPL
Stage	Mumbai won	Chennai won
League	16	16
Playoffs	2	3
Finals	3	1
Total	21	20

Chennai Super Kings win
Mumbai Indians win

Season	Venue	Date	CSK score	MI score	Result	Player of the match
2008	M. A. Chidambaram Stadium, Chennai	23 April 2008	208/5 (20 overs)	202/7 (20 overs)	CSK won by 6 runs	Mathew Hayden
2008	Wankhede Stadium, Mumbai	14 May 2008	156/6 (20 overs)	158/1 (13.5 overs)	MI won by 9 wickets	Sanath Jayasuriya
2009	Newlands, Cape Town	18 April 2009	146/7 (20 overs)	165/7 (20 overs)	MI won by 19 runs	Sachin Tendulkar
2009	St George's Park, Port Elizabeth	16 May 2009	151/3 (19.1 overs)	147/5 (20 overs)	CSK won by 7 wickets	Matthew Hayden
2010	Brabourne Stadium, Mumbai	25 March 2010	180/2 (20 overs)	184/5 (19 overs)	MI won by 5 wickets	Sachin Tendulkar
2010	M. A. Chidambaram Stadium, Chennai	6 April 2010	165/4 (20 overs)	141/9 (19 overs)	CSK won by 24 runs	Suresh Raina
2010	DY Patil Stadium, Mumbai **(Final)**	25 April 2010	168/5 (20 overs)	146/9 (20 overs)	CSK won by 22 runs	Suresh Raina
2011	Wankhede Stadium, Mumbai	22 April 2011	156/9 (20 overs)	164/4 (20 overs)	MI won by 8 runs	Harbhajan Singh
2012	M. A. Chidambaram Stadium, Chennai	4 April 2012	112 (19.5 overs)	115/2 (16.5 overs)	MI won by 8 wickets	Richard Levi
2012	Wankhede Stadium, Mumbai	6 May 2012	173/8 (20 overs)	174/8 (19 overs)	MI won by 2 wickets	Dwayne Smith
2012	M. Chinnaswamy Stadium, Bangalore **(Eliminator)**	23 May 2012	187/5 (20 overs)	149/9 (20 overs)	CSK won by 38 runs	Mahendra Singh Dhoni
2013	M. A. Chidambaram Stadium, Chennai	6 April 2013	139/9 (20 overs)	148/6 (20 overs)	MI won by 9 runs	Kieron Pollard
2013	Wankhede Stadium, Mumbai	5 May 2013	79 (15.2 overs)	139/5 (20 overs)	MI won by 60 runs	Mitchell Johnson
2013	Feroz Shah Kotla, Delhi **(Qualifier 1)**	21 May 2013	192/1 (20 overs)	144 (18.2 overs)	CSK won by 48 runs	Michael Hussey
2013	Eden Gardens, Kolkata **(Final)**	26 May 2013	125/9 (20 overs)	148/9 (20 overs)	MI won by 23 runs	Kieron Pollard
2014	Dubai International Cricket Stadium, Dubai	25 April 2014	142/3 (19 overs)	141/7 (20 overs)	CSK won by 7 wickets	Mohit Sharma
2014	Wankhede Stadium, Mumbai	10 May 2014	160/6 (19.3 overs)	157/6 (20 overs)	CSK won by 4 wickets	Dwayne Smith
2014	Brabourne Stadium, Mumbai **(Eliminator)**	28 May 2014	176/3 (18.4 overs)	173/8 (20 overs)	CSK won by 7 wickets	Suresh Raina
2015	Wankhede Stadium, Mumbai	17 April 2015	189/4 (16.4 overs)	183/7 (20 overs)	CSK won by 6 wickets	Ashish Nehra
2015	M. A. Chidambaram Stadium, Chennai	8 May 2015	158/5 (20 overs)	159/4 (19.2 overs)	MI won by 6 wickets	Hardik Pandya
2015	Wankhede Stadium, Mumbai **(Qualifier 1)**	19 May 2015	162 (19 overs)	187/6 (20 overs)	MI won by 25 runs	Kieron Pollard
2015	Eden Gardens, Kolkata **(Final)**	24 May 2015	161/8 (20 overs)	202/5 (20 overs)	MI won by 41 runs	Rohit Sharma
2018	Wankhede Stadium, Mumbai	7 April 2018	169/9 (19.5 overs)	165/4 (20 overs)	CSK won by 1 wicket	Dwayne Bravo
2018	Maharashtra Cricket Association Stadium, Pune	28 April 2018	169/5 (20 overs)	170/2 (19.4 overs)	MI won by 8 wickets	Rohit Sharma
2019	Wankhede Stadium, Mumbai	17 April 2019	133/8 (20 overs)	170/5 (20 overs)	MI won by 37 runs	Hardik Pandya
2019	M. A. Chidambaram Stadium, Chennai	26 April 2019	109 (17.4 overs)	155/4 (20 overs)	MI won by 46 rums	Rohit Sharma
2019	M. A. Chidambaram Stadium, Chennai **(Qualifier 1)**	7 May 2019	131/4 (20 overs)	132/4 (18.3 overs)	MI won by 6 wickets	Suryakumar Yadav
2019	Rajiv Gandhi International Cricket Stadium, Hyderabad **(Final)**	12 May 2019	148/7 (20 overs)	149/8 (20 overs)	MI won by 1 run	Jasprit Bumrah
2020	Sheikh Zayed Cricket Stadium, Abu Dhabi	19 September 2020	166/5 (19.2 overs)	162/9 (20 overs)	CSK won by 5 wickets	Ambati Rayudu
2020	Sharjah Cricket Stadium, Sharjah	23 October 2020	114/9 (20 overs)	116/0 (12.2 overs)	MI won by 10 wickets	Trent Boult
2021	Arun Jaitley Stadium, Delhi	1 May 2021	218/4 (20 overs)	219/6 (20 overs)	MI won by 4 wickets	Kieron Pollard
2021	Dubai International Cricket Stadium, Dubai	19 September 2021	156/6 (20 overs)	136/8 (20 overs)	CSK won by 20 runs	Ruturaj Gaikwad
2022	DY Patil Stadium, Mumbai	21 April 2022	156/7 (20 overs)	155/7 (20 overs)	CSK won by 3 wickets	Mukesh Choudhary
2022	Wankhede Stadium, Mumbai	12 May 2022	97 (16 overs)	103/5 (14.5 overs)	MI won by 5 wickets	Daniel Sams
2023	Wankhede Stadium, Mumbai	8 April 2023	159/3 (18.1 overs)	157/8 (20 overs)	CSK won by 7 wickets	Ravindra Jadeja
2023	M. A. Chidambaram Stadium, Chennai	9 May 2023	140/4 (17.4 overs)	139/8 (20 overs)	CSK won by 6 wickets	Matheesha Pathirana
2024	Wankhede Stadium, Mumbai	14 April 2024	206/4 (20 overs)	186/6 (20 overs)	CSK won by 20 runs	Matheesha Pathirana
2025	M. A. Chidambaram Stadium, Chennai	23 March 2025	158/6 (19.1 overs)	155/9 (20 overs)	CSK won by 4 wickets	Noor Ahmad
2025	Wankhede Stadium, Mumbai	20 April 2025	176/5 (20 overs)	177/1 (15.4 overs)	MI won by 9 wickets	Rohit Sharma
2026	Wankhede Stadium, Mumbai	23 April 2026	207/6 (20 overs)	104 (19 overs)	CSK won by 103 runs	Sanju Samson
2026	M. A. Chidambaram Stadium, Chennai	2 May 2026	160/2 (18.1 overs)	159/7 (20 overs)	CSK won by 8 wickets	Ruturaj Gaikwad

Meetings in IPL

=== IPL 2008 ===
23 April 2008
20:00 (D/N)
Scorecard

**(H) Chennai Super Kings**; 208/5 (20 overs)	**v**	**Mumbai Indians**; 202/7 (20 overs)
Matthew Hayden 81 (46); Musavir Khote 2/29 (3 overs)		Abhishek Nayar 45* (20); Joginder Sharma 2/29 (4 overs)

**Chennai won by 6 runs**
M. A. Chidambaram Stadium, Chennai
Umpires: Daryl Harper and GA Pratapkumar
Player of the match: Matthew Hayden (Chennai Super Kings)

- Mumbai Indians won the toss and elected to field.

14 May 2008
20:00 (D/N)
Scorecard

**Chennai Super Kings**; 156/6 (20 overs)	**v**	**Mumbai Indians (H)**; 158/1 (13.5 overs)
Subramaniam Badrinath 53 (33); Dhawal Kulkarni 3/33 (4 overs)		Sanath Jayasuriya 114* (48); Joginder Sharma 1/24 (3 overs)

**Mumbai won by 9 wickets**
Wankhede Stadium, Mumbai
Umpires: Billy Doctrove and Amiesh Saheba
Player of the match: Sanath Jayasuriya (Mumbai Indians)

- Mumbai Indians won the toss and elected to field.

=== IPL 2009 ===
18 April
16:00
Scorecard

**Mumbai Indians**; 165/7 (20 overs)	**v**	**Chennai Super Kings**; 146/7 (20 overs)
Sachin Tendulkar 59* (49, 7x4 0x6); Manpreet Gony 2/32 (4 overs)		Matthew Hayden 44 (35, 6x4 1x6); Lasith Malinga 3/15 (4 overs)

**Mumbai won by 19 runs**
Newlands, Cape Town
Umpires: Billy Doctrove and Krishna Hariharan
Player of the match: Sachin Tendulkar (Mumbai Indians)

- Chennai Super Kings won the toss and elected to field.

16 May
16:00
Scorecard

**Mumbai Indians**; 147/5 (20 overs)	**v**	**Chennai Super Kings**; 151/3 (19.1 overs)
JP Duminy 62 (40); Suresh Raina 1/22 (4 overs)		Matthew Hayden 60 (57); Lasith Malinga 1/19 (4 overs)

**Chennai win by 7 wickets**
St George's Park, Port Elizabeth
Umpires: Shavir Tarapore and Simon Taufel
Player of the match: Matthew Hayden (Chennai Super Kings)

- Mumbai Indians won the toss and elected to bat.

=== IPL 2010 ===
25 March
Scorecard

**Chennai Super Kings**; 180/2 (20 overs)	**v**	**Mumbai Indians (H)**; 184/5 (19 overs)
Suresh Raina 83* (52); Ryan McLaren 1/23 (4 overs)		Sachin Tendulkar 72 (52); Muttiah Muralitharan 2/32 (4 overs)

**Mumbai won by 5 wickets**
Brabourne Stadium, Mumbai
Umpires: Billy Bowden and Amiesh Saheba
Player of the match: Sachin Tendulkar (Mumbai Indians)

- Mumbai Indians won the toss and chose to bowl first.

6 April
Scorecard

**(H) Chennai Super Kings**; 165/4 (20 overs)	**v**	**Mumbai Indians**; 141/9 (20 overs)
Matthew Hayden 35 (31); Kieron Pollard 2/27 (4 overs)		Sachin Tendulkar 45 (35); Ravichandran Ashwin 2/22 (4 overs)

**Chennai won by 24 runs**
M. A. Chidambaram Stadium, Chennai
Umpires: Daryl Harper and Sudhir Asnani
Player of the match: Suresh Raina (Chennai Super Kings)

- Chennai Super Kings won the toss and elected to bat first.

Final

25 April
Scorecard

**Chennai Super Kings**; 168/5 (20 overs)	**v**	**Mumbai Indians**; 146/9 (20 overs)
Suresh Raina 57* (35); Dilhara Fernando 2/23 (4 overs)		Sachin Tendulkar 48 (45); Shadab Jakati 2/26 (3 overs)

**Chennai won by 22 runs**
DY Patil Stadium, Mumbai
Umpires: Rudi Koertzen and Simon Taufel
Player of the match: Suresh Raina (Chennai Super Kings)

- Chennai Super Kings won the toss and elected to bat first.

=== IPL 2011 ===
22 April 2011
20:00 (D/N)
Scorecard

**(H) Mumbai Indians**; 164/4 (20 overs)	**v**	**Chennai Super Kings**; 156/9 (20 overs)
Rohit Sharma 87 (48); Doug Bollinger 2/30 (4 overs)		Subramaniam Badrinath 71* (48); Harbhajan Singh 5/18 (4 overs)

**Mumbai won by 8 runs**
Wankhede Stadium, Mumbai
Umpires: Asad Rauf (Pak) and Amiesh Saheba (Ind)
Player of the match: Harbhajan Singh (Mumbai Indians)

- Chennai Super Kings won the toss and elected to field.

=== IPL 2012 ===
4 April 2012
20:00 (D/N)
Scorecard

**(H) Chennai Super Kings**; 112 (19.5 overs)	**v**	**Mumbai Indians**; 115/2 (16.5 overs)
Suresh Raina 36 (26); Kieron Pollard 2/15 (4 overs)		Richard Levi 50 (35); Dwayne Bravo 1/14 (3 overs)

**Mumbai won by 8 wickets**
M. A. Chidambaram Stadium, Chennai
Player of the match: Richard Levi (Mumbai Indians)

- Mumbai Indians won the toss and elected to field.

6 May 2012
16:00 (D/N)
Scorecard

**Chennai Super Kings**; 173/8 (20 overs)	**v**	**Mumbai Indians (H)**; 174/8 (20 overs)
Murali Vijay 41 (29); Lasith Malinga 3/25 (4 overs)		Sachin Tendulkar 74 (44); Ravindra Jadeja 2/12 (2 overs)

**Mumbai won by 2 wickets**
Wankhede Stadium, Mumbai
Player of the match: Dwayne Smith (Mumbai Indians)

- Mumbai Indians won the toss and elected to field.

Eliminator

23 May 2012
20:00 (D/N)
Scorecard

**Chennai Super Kings**; 187/5 (20 overs)	**v**	**Mumbai Indians**; 149/9 (20 overs)
Mahendra Singh Dhoni 51* (20); Dhawal Kulkarni 3/46 (4 overs)		Dwayne Smith 38 (22); Dwayne Bravo 2/10 (3 overs)

**Chennai Super Kings won by 38 runs**
M. Chinnaswamy Stadium, Bangalore
Umpires: Billy Bowden (NZ) and Kumar Dharmasena (SL)
Player of the match: Mahendra Singh Dhoni (Chennai Super Kings)

- Mumbai Indians won the toss and elected to field.
- Mahendra Singh Dhoni hit James Franklin for the tournament's biggest six, 112 metres.

=== IPL 2013 ===
6 April
20:00 (D/N)
Scorecard

**Mumbai Indians**; 148/6 (20 overs)	**v**	**Chennai Super Kings (H)**; 139/9 (20 overs)
Kieron Pollard 57* (38); Dwayne Bravo 2/44 (4 overs)		Mahendra Singh Dhoni 51 (26); Munaf Patel 3/29 (4 overs)

**Mumbai won by 9 runs**
M. A. Chidambaram Stadium, Chepauk, Chennai
Umpires: Marais Erasmus (SA) and Vineet Kulkarni (Ind)
Player of the match: Kieron Pollard (Mumbai Indians)

- Mumbai Indians won the toss and elected to bat.

5 May
16:00 (D/N)
Scorecard

**(H) Mumbai Indians**; 139/5 (20 overs)	**v**	**Chennai Super Kings**; 79 (15.2 overs)
Rohit Sharma 39* (30); Ravindra Jadeja 3/29 (4 overs)		Michael Hussey 22 (26); Pragyan Ojha 3/11 (2.2 overs)

**Mumbai won by 60 runs**
Wankhede Stadium, Mumbai
Umpires: Kumar Dharmasena (SL) and CK Nandan (Ind)
Player of the match: Mitchell Johnson (Mumbai Indians)

- Mumbai Indians won the toss and elected to bat.

Qualifier 1

Qualifier 1
21 May
20:00 (D/N)
Scorecard

**Chennai Super Kings**; 192/1 (20 overs)	**v**	**Mumbai Indians**; 144 (18.4 overs)
Michael Hussey 86* (58); Kieron Pollard 1/28 (3 overs)		Dwayne Smith 68 (28); Dwayne Bravo 3/9 (3 overs)

**Chennai won by 48 runs**
Feroz Shah Kotla, Delhi
Umpires: Nigel Llong (Eng) and Rod Tucker (Aus)
Player of the match: Michael Hussey (Chennai Super Kings)

- Chennai Super Kings won the toss and elected to bat.

Final

Final
26 May
20:00 (D/N)
Scorecard

**Mumbai Indians**; 148/9 (20 overs)	**v**	**Chennai Super Kings**; 125/9 (20 overs)
Kieron Pollard 60* (32); Dwayne Bravo 4/42 (4 overs)		Mahendra Singh Dhoni 63* (45); Harbhajan Singh 2/14 (3 overs)

**Mumbai won by 23 runs**
Eden Gardens, Kolkata
Umpires: Kumar Dharmasena (SL) and Simon Taufel (Aus)
Player of the match: Kieron Pollard (Mumbai Indians)

- Mumbai Indians won the toss and elected to bat.

=== IPL 2014 ===
25 April
20:00 (D/N)
Scorecard

**Mumbai Indians**; 141/7 (20 overs)	**v**	**Chennai Super Kings (H)**; 142/3 (19 overs)
Rohit Sharma 50 (41); Mohit Sharma 4/14 (4 overs)		Brendon McCullum 71* (53); Harbhajan Singh 2/27 (4 overs)

**Chennai won by 7 wickets**
Dubai International Cricket Stadium, Dubai, UAE
Umpires: Billy Bowden (NZ) and Marais Erasmus (SA)
Player of the match: Mohit Sharma (Chennai Super Kings)

- Mumbai Indians won the toss and chose to bat.
- This was the **100th IPL match** for both MS Dhoni and Rohit Sharma.

10 May
20:00 (D/N)
Scorecard

**(H) Mumbai Indians**; 157/6 (20 overs)	**v**	**Chennai Super Kings**; 160/6 (19.3 overs)
Ambati Rayudu 59 (43); Ravichandran Ashwin 3/30 (4 overs)		Dwayne Smith 57 (51); Lasith Malinga 2/15 (4 overs)

**Chennai won by 4 wickets**
Wankhede Stadium, Mumbai
Umpires: Kumar Dharmasena (SL) and Vineet Kulkarni (Ind)
Player of the match: Dwayne Smith (Chennai Super Kings)

- Chennai Super Kings won the toss and elected to field.

Eliminator

Eliminator
28 May
20:00 (D/N)
Scorecard

**Mumbai Indians**; 173/8 (20 overs)	**v**	**Chennai Super Kings**; 176/3 (18.4 overs)
Lendl Simmons 67 (44); Mohit Sharma 3/42 (4 overs)		Suresh Raina 54* (33); Harbhajan Singh 2/27 (4 overs)

**Chennai Super Kings won by 7 wickets**
Brabourne Stadium, Mumbai
Umpires: Vineet Kulkarni (Ind) and Bruce Oxenford (Aus)
Player of the match: Suresh Raina (Chennai Super Kings)

- Chennai Super Kings won the toss and elected to field.

=== IPL 2015 ===
17 April
20:00 (D/N)
Scorecard

**(H) Mumbai Indians**; 183/7 (20 overs)	**v**	**Chennai Super Kings**; 189/4 (16.4 overs)
Kieron Pollard 64 (30); Ashish Nehra 3/23 (4 overs)		Dwayne Smith 62 (30); Harbhajan Singh 2/44 (4 overs)

**Chennai Super Kings won by 6 wickets**
Wankhede Stadium, Mumbai
Umpires: Anil Chaudhary (Ind) and Marais Erasmus (SA)
Player of the match: Ashish Nehra (Chennai Super Kings)

- Mumbai Indians won the toss and elected to bat.

8 May
20:00 (D/N)
Scorecard

**(H) Chennai Super Kings**; 158/5 (20 overs)	**v**	**Mumbai Indians**; 159/4 (19.2 overs)
Mahendra Singh Dhoni 39 (32); Jagadeesha Suchith 1/21 (4 overs)		Parthiv Patel 45 (32); Ravichandran Ashwin 2/17 (4 overs)

**Mumbai Indians won by 6 wickets**
M A Chidambaram Stadium, Chennai
Umpires: Chris Gaffaney (NZ) and CK Nandan (Ind)
Player of the match: Hardik Pandya (Mumbai Indians)

- Chennai Super Kings won the toss and elected to bat.
- Kings XI Punjab were eliminated as a result of this match.

Qualifier 1

19 May
20:00 (D/N)
Scorecard

**Mumbai Indians**; 187/6 (20 overs)	**v**	**Chennai Super Kings**; 162 (19 overs)
Lendl Simmons 65 (51); Dwayne Bravo 3/40 (4 overs)		Faf du Plessis 45 (34); Lasith Malinga 3/23 (4 overs)

**Mumbai Indians won by 25 runs**
Wankhede Stadium, Mumbai
Umpires: Kumar Dharmasena (SL) and Richard Illingworth (Eng)
Player of the match: Kieron Pollard (Mumbai Indians)

- Mumbai Indians won the toss and elected to bat.

Final

24 May
20:00 (D/N)
Scorecard

**Mumbai Indians**; 202/5 (20 overs)	**v**	**Chennai Super Kings**; 161/8 (20 overs)
Lendl Simmons 68 (45); Dwayne Bravo 2/36 (4 overs)		Dwayne Smith 57 (48); Mitchell McClenaghan 3/25 (4 overs)

**Mumbai Indians won by 41 runs**
Eden Gardens, Kolkata
Umpires: Kumar Dharmasena (SL) and Richard Illingworth (Eng)
Player of the match: Rohit Sharma (Mumbai Indians)

- Chennai Super Kings won the toss and elected to field.

=== IPL 2018 ===
7 April 2018
20:00 (D/N)
Scorecard

**(H) Mumbai Indians**; 165/4 (20 overs)	**v**	**Chennai Super Kings**; 169/9 (19.5 overs)
Suryakumar Yadav 43 (29); Shane Watson 2/29 (4 overs)		Dwayne Bravo 68 (30); Mayank Markande 3/23 (4 overs)

**Chennai Super Kings won by 1 wicket**
Wankhede Stadium, Mumbai
Umpires: Chris Gaffaney (New Zealand) and Nand Kishore (India)
Player of the match: Dwayne Bravo (Chennai Super Kings)

- Chennai Super Kings won the toss and elected to field.

28 April 2018
20:00 (D/N)
Scorecard

**(H) Chennai Super Kings**; 169/5 (20 overs)	**v**	**Mumbai Indians**; 170/2 (19.4 overs)
Suresh Raina 75* (47); Mitchell McClenaghan 2/26 (4 overs)		Rohit Sharma 56* (33); Harbhajan Singh 1/20 (3.5 overs)

**Mumbai Indians won by 8 wickets**
Maharashtra Cricket Association Stadium, Pune
Umpires: Chris Gaffaney (New Zealand) and Nitin Menon (India)
Player of the match: Rohit Sharma (Mumbai Indians)

- Mumbai Indians won the toss and elected to field.

=== IPL 2019 ===
3 April
20:00 (D/N)
Scorecard

**(H) Mumbai Indians**; 170/5 (20 overs)	**v**	**Chennai Super Kings**; 133/8 (20 overs)
Suryakumar Yadav 59 (43); Ravindra Jadeja 1/10 (2 overs)		Kedar Jadhav 58 (54); Hardik Pandya 3/20 (4 overs)

**Mumbai won by 37 runs**
Wankhede Stadium, Mumbai
Umpires: Bruce Oxenford (Aus) and Rod Tucker (Aus)
Player of the match: Hardik Pandya (Mumbai Indians)

- Chennai Super Kings won the toss and elected to field.
- Mumbai Indians became the first team in the IPL to win 100 matches.

26 April
20:00 (D/N)
Scorecard

**Mumbai Indians**; 155/4 (20 overs)	**v**	**Chennai Super Kings (H)**; 109 (17.4 overs)
Rohit Sharma 67 (48); Mitchell Santner 2/13 (4 overs)		Murali Vijay 38 (35); Lasith Malinga 4/37 (3.4 overs)

**Mumbai won by 46 runs**
M. A. Chidambaram Stadium, Chennai
Umpires: Anil Chaudhary (Ind) and Nigel Llong (Eng)
Player of the match: Rohit Sharma (Mumbai Indians)

- Chennai Super Kings won the toss and elected to field.

Qualifier 1

7 May
19:30 (D/N)
Scorecard

**Chennai Super Kings**; 131/4 (20 overs)	**v**	**Mumbai Indians**; 132/4 (18.3 overs)
Ambati Rayudu 42* (37); Rahul Chahar 2/14 (4 overs)		Suryakumar Yadav 71* (54); Imran Tahir 2/33 (4 overs)

**Mumbai Indians won by 6 wickets**
M. A. Chidambaram Stadium, Chennai
Umpires: Nigel Llong (Eng) and Nitin Menon (Ind)
Player of the match: Suryakumar Yadav (Mumbai Indians)

- Chennai Super Kings won the toss and elected to bat.

Final

12 May
19:30 (D/N)
Scorecard

**Mumbai Indians**; 149/8 (20 overs)	**v**	**Chennai Super Kings**; 148/7 (20 overs)
Kieron Pollard 41* (25); Deepak Chahar 3/26 (4 overs)		Shane Watson 80 (59); Jasprit Bumrah 2/14 (4 overs)

**Mumbai Indians won by 1 run**
Rajiv Gandhi International Cricket Stadium, Hyderabad
Umpires: Ian Gould (Eng) and Nitin Menon (Ind)
Player of the match: Jasprit Bumrah (Mumbai Indians)

- Mumbai Indians won the toss and elected to bat.

=== IPL 2020 ===
19 September 2020
19:30 (D/N)
Scorecard

**Mumbai Indians**; 162/9 (20 overs)	**v**	**Chennai Super Kings**; 166/5 (19.2 overs)
Saurabh Tiwary 42 (31); Lungi Ngidi 3/38 (4 overs)		Ambati Rayudu 71 (48); Trent Boult 1/23 (3.2 overs)

**Chennai Super Kings won by 5 wickets**
Sheikh Zayed Cricket Stadium, Abu Dhabi
Umpires: Chris Gaffaney (NZ) and Virender Sharma (Ind)
Player of the match: Ambati Rayudu (Chennai Super Kings)

- Chennai Super Kings won the toss and elected to field.

23 October 2020
19:30 (D/N)
Scorecard

**Chennai Super Kings**; 114/9 (20 overs)	**v**	**Mumbai Indians**; 116/0 (12.2 overs)
Sam Curran 52 (47); Trent Boult 4/18 (4 overs)		Ishan Kishan 68* (37)

**Mumbai Indians won by 10 wickets**
Sharjah Cricket Stadium, Sharjah
Umpires: Vineet Kulkarni (Ind) and Chettithody Shamshuddin (Ind)
Player of the match: Trent Boult (Mumbai Indians)

- Mumbai Indians won the toss and elected to field.

=== IPL 2021 ===
Match 27
1 May 2021
19:30 (N)
Scorecard

**Chennai Super Kings**; 218/4 (20 overs)	**v**	**Mumbai Indians**; 219/6 (20 overs)
Ambati Rayudu 72* (27); Kieron Pollard 2/12 (2 overs)		Kieron Pollard 87* (34); Sam Curran 3/34 (4 overs)

**Mumbai Indians won by 4 wickets**
Arun Jaitley Stadium, Delhi
Umpires: KN Ananthapadmanabhan (Ind) and C. K. Nandan (Ind)
Player of the match: Kieron Pollard (Mumbai Indians)

- Mumbai Indians won the toss and elected to field.

Match 30
19 September 2021
19:30 (N)
Scorecard

**Chennai Super Kings**; 156/6 (20 overs)	**v**	**Mumbai Indians**; 136/8 (20 overs)
Ruturaj Gaikwad 88* (58); Adam Milne 2/21 (4 overs)		Saurabh Tiwary 50* (40); Dwayne Bravo 3/25 (4 overs)

**Chennai Super Kings won by 20 runs**
Dubai International Cricket Stadium, Dubai
Umpires: Richard Illingworth (Eng) and Nitin Menon (Ind)
Player of the match: Ruturaj Gaikwad (Chennai Super Kings)

- Chennai Super Kings won the toss and elected to bat.

=== IPL 2022 ===
21 April 2022
19:30 (D/N)
Scorecard

**Mumbai Indians**; 155/7 (20 overs)	**v**	**Chennai Super Kings**; 156/7 (20 overs)
Tilak Varma 51* (43); Mukesh Choudhary 3/19 (3 overs)		Ambati Rayudu 40 (35); Daniel Sams 4/30 (4 overs)

**Chennai Super Kings won by 3 wickets**
DY Patil Stadium, Navi Mumbai
Umpires: Ulhas Gandhe (Ind) and Bruce Oxenford (Aus)
Player of the match: Mukesh Choudhary (Chennai Super Kings)

- Chennai Super Kings won the toss and elected to field.

12 May 2022
19:30 (N)
Scorecard

**Chennai Super Kings**; 97 (16 overs)	**v**	**Mumbai Indians**; 103/5 (14.5 overs)
MS Dhoni 36* (33); Daniel Sams 3/16 (4 overs)		Tilak Varma 34* (32); Mukesh Choudhary 3/23 (4 overs)

**Mumbai Indians won by 5 wickets**
Wankhede Stadium, Mumbai
Umpires: Chris Gaffaney (NZ) and Chirra Ravikanthreddy (Ind)
Player of the match: Daniel Sams (Mumbai Indians)

- Mumbai Indians won the toss and elected to field.

=== IPL 2023 ===
**Match 12**
8 April 2023
19:30 (N)
Scorecard

**(H) Mumbai Indians**; 157/8 (20 overs)	**v**	**Chennai Super Kings**; 159/3 (18.1 overs)
Ishan Kishan 32 (21); Ravindra Jadeja 3/20 (4 overs)		Ajinkya Rahane 61 (27); Kumar Kartikeya 1/24 (4 overs)

**Chennai Super Kings won by 7 wickets**
Wankhede Stadium, Mumbai
Umpires: Chris Gaffaney (NZ) and Nikhil Patwardhan (Ind)
Player of the match: Ravindra Jadeja (Chennai Super Kings)

- Chennai Super Kings won the toss and elected to field.

**Match 49**
6 May 2023
15:30 (D/N)
Scorecard

**Mumbai Indians**; 139/8 (20 overs)	**v**	**Chennai Super Kings (H)**; 140/4 (17.4 overs)
Nehal Wadhera 64 (51); Matheesha Pathirana 3/15 (4 overs)		Devon Conway 44 (42); Piyush Chawla 2/25 (4 overs)

**Chennai Super Kings won by 6 wickets**
M. A. Chidambaram Stadium, Chennai
Umpires: Bruce Oxenford (Aus) and Navdeep Singh (Ind)
Player of the match: Matheesha Pathirana (Chennai Super Kings)

- Chennai Super Kings won the toss and elected to field.
- Raghav Goyal (Mumbai Indians) made his T20 debut.

=== IPL 2024 ===
Match 29
14 April 2024
19:30 (N)
Scorecard

**Chennai Super Kings**; 206/4 (20 overs)	**v**	**Mumbai Indians (H)**; 186/6 (20 overs)
Ruturaj Gaikwad 69 (40); Hardik Pandya 2/43 (3 overs)		Rohit Sharma 105* (63); Matheesha Pathirana 4/28 (4 overs)

**Chennai Super Kings won by 20 runs**
Wankhede Stadium, Mumbai
Umpires: Saiyed Khalid (Ind) and Nitin Menon (Ind)
Player of the match: Matheesha Pathirana (Chennai Super Kings)

- Mumbai Indians won the toss and elected to field.

=== IPL 2025 ===
Match 3
23 March 2025
19:30 (N)
Scorecard

**Mumbai Indians**; 155/9 (20 overs)	**v**	**Chennai Super Kings (H)**; 158/6 (19.1 overs)
Tilak Varma 31 (25); Noor Ahmad 4/18 (4 overs)		Rachin Ravindra 65* (45); Vignesh Puthur 3/32 (4 overs)

**Chennai Super Kings won by 4 wickets**
M. A. Chidambaram Stadium, Chennai
Umpires: K. N. Ananthapadmanabhan (Ind) and Saiyed Khalid (Ind)
Player of the match: Noor Ahmad (Chennai Super Kings)

- Chennai Super Kings won the toss and elected to field.
- Vignesh Puthur (Mumbai Indians) made his T20 debut.
- Ryan Rickelton (Mumbai Indians) made his IPL debut.

Match 38
20 April 2025
19:30 (N)
Scorecard

**Chennai Super Kings**; 176/5 (20 overs)	**v**	**Mumbai Indians (H)**; 177/1 (15.4 overs)
Ravindra Jadeja 53* (35); Jasprit Bumrah 2/25 (4 overs)		Rohit Sharma 76* (45); Ravindra Jadeja 1/28 (3 overs)

**Mumbai Indians won by 9 wickets**
Wankhede Stadium, Mumbai
Umpires: Abhijit Bhattacharya (Ind) and Virender Sharma (Ind)
Player of the match: Rohit Sharma (Mumbai Indians)

- Mumbai Indians won the toss and elected to field.
- Ayush Mhatre (Chennai Super Kings) made his T20 debut.

=== IPL 2026 ===
Match 33
23 April 2026
19:30 (N)
Scorecard

**Chennai Super Kings**; 207/6 (20 overs)	**v**	**Mumbai Indians (H)**; 104 (19 overs)
Sanju Samson 101* (54); Allah Ghazanfar 2/25 (4 overs)		Tilak Varma 37 (29); Akeal Hosein 4/17 (4 overs)

**Chennai Super Kings won by 103 runs**
Wankhede Stadium, Mumbai
Umpires: Adrian Holdstock (SA) and Parashar Joshi (Ind)
Player of the match: Sanju Samson (Chennai Super Kings)

- Mumbai Indians won the toss and elected to field.
- Shardul Thakur replaced Mitchell Santner as a concussion substitute after the latter got injured during the first innings.
- This was Mumbai Indians' biggest defeat by a margin of runs.

== Meetings in CLT20 ==
Head To Head in CLT20
	Total	League
Matches	2	2
MI won	1	1
CSK won	1	1

Meetings in CLT20

=== CLT20 2011 ===
24 September
20:00 (D/N)
Scorecard

Chennai Super Kings (India); 158/4 (20 overs)	v	(India) Mumbai Indians; 159/7 (19.5 overs)
Michael Hussey 81 (57); Abu Nechim 2/35 (4 overs)		Lasith Malinga 37* (18); Suresh Raina 2/6 (2 overs)

Mumbai Indians won by 3 wickets
M. A. Chidambaram Stadium, Chennai
Umpires: Billy Bowden and Johanes Cloete
Player of the match: (Sri Lanka) Lasith Malinga (Mumbai Indians)

- Chennai Super Kings won the toss and elected to bat.

=== CLT20 2012 ===
20 October
17:30 (D/N)
Scorecard

Chennai Super Kings (India); 173/8 (20 overs)	v	(India) Mumbai Indians; 167/7 (20 overs)
Faf du Plessis 52 (33); Lasith Malinga 5/32 (4 overs)		Dinesh Karthik 74 (45); Ben Hilfenhaus 2/14 (4 overs)

Chennai Super Kings won by 6 runs
New Wanderers Stadium, Johannesburg
Umpires: Kumar Dharmasena (SL) and Rod Tucker (Aus)
Player of the match: (Australia) Ben Hilfenhaus (Chennai Super Kings)

- Mumbai Indians won the toss and elected to field

== Records ==
=== Team Records ===
==== Highest team total ====
As of 15 April 2024

Score	Team	Venue	Date
219/6	MI	Arun Jaitley Stadium, Delhi	1 May 2021
218/4	CSK	Arun Jaitley Stadium, Delhi	1 May 2021
208/5	CSK	M. A. Chidambaram Stadium, Chennai	23 April 2008
207/6	CSK	Wankhede Stadium, Mumbai	23 April 2026
206/4	CSK	Wankhede Stadium, Mumbai	14 April 2024
202/7	MI	M. A. Chidambaram Stadium, Chennai	23 April 2008

==== Lowest team total ====
As of 24 April 2026

Score	Team	Venue	Date
79/10	CSK	Wankhede Stadium, Mumbai	5 May 2013
97/10	CSK	Wankhede Stadium, Mumbai	12 May 2022
104/10	MI	Wankhede Stadium, Mumbai	23 April 2026
109/10	CSK	M. A. Chidambaram Stadium, Chennai	26 April 2019
112/10	CSK	M. A. Chidambaram Stadium, Chennai	4 April 2012
114/9	CSK	Sharjah Cricket Stadium, Sharjah	23 October 2020

==== Greatest win margin (by runs) ====
As of 23 April 2026

Margin	Team	Venue	Date
103 runs	CSK	Wankhede Stadium, Mumbai	23 April 2026
60 runs	MI	Wankhede Stadium, Mumbai	5 May 2013
48 runs	CSK	Arun Jaitley Stadium, Delhi	21 May 2013
46 runs	MI	M. A. Chidambaram Stadium, Chennai	26 April 2019
41 runs	MI	Eden Gardens, Kolkata	24 May 2015
38 runs	CSK	M. Chinnaswamy Stadium, Bengaluru	23 May 2012

==== Narrowest win margin (by runs) ====
As of 15 April 2024

Margin	Team	Venue	Date
1 run	MI	Rajiv Gandhi Stadium, Hyderabad	12 May 2019
6 runs	CSK	M. A. Chidambaram Stadium, Chennai	23 April 2008
6 runs	CSK	Wanderers Stadium, Johannesburg	20 October 2012
8 runs	MI	Wankhede Stadium, Mumbai	22 April 2011
9 runs	MI	M. A. Chidambaram Stadium, Chennai	4 April 2013

=== Individual Records ===
==== Most Runs ====
Runs	Player	Teams	Innings	Seasons
837	(India) Rohit Sharma†	MI	29	2011–2024
736	(India) Suresh Raina	CSK	32	2008–2021
732	(India) MS Dhoni†	CSK	33	2008–2024
664	(India) Ambati Rayudu	CSK/MI	33	2008–2023
636	(Cricket West Indies) Kieron Pollard	MI	25	2008–2022

==== Highest Individual Score ====
Score	Player	Team	Season
114*	(Sri Lanka) Sanath Jayasuriya	MI	2008
105*	(India) Rohit Sharma	MI	2024
101*	(India) Sanju Samson	CSK	2026
88*	(India) Ruturaj Gaikwad	CSK	2021
87*	(Trinidad and Tobago) Kieron Pollard	MI	2021
87	(India) Rohit Sharma	MI	2011

==== Most Wickets ====
Player	Wickets	Active seasons
(Sri Lanka) Lasith Malinga (MI)	37	2008–2017, 2019
(Cricket West Indies) Dwayne Bravo (MI,CSK)	37	2008–2015, 2018–2022
(India) Harbhajan Singh (MI,CSK)	26	2008–2020
(India) Ravindra Jadeja (CSK)	22	2012–2015, 2018–2025
(India) Mohit Sharma (CSK)	15	2013–2015, 2019

==== Best Bowling Figures ====
Player	Figures	Season
(India) Harbhajan Singh (MI)	5/18	2011
(Sri Lanka) Lasith Malinga (MI)	5/32	2012
(India) Mohit Sharma (CSK)	4/14	2014
(Wisconsin) Akeal Hosein (CSK)	4/17	2026
(Afghanistan) Noor Ahmad (CSK)	4/18	2025
(New Zealand) Trent Boult (MI)	4/18	2020

Last updated: 15 April 2024 (Source: ESPNcricinfo)

=== Other records ===
- Fastest Fifty: Kieron Pollard (MI)
  - 17 balls at Arun Jaitley Stadium (1 May 2021)
- Fastest Century: Sanath Jayasuriya (MI)
  - 45 balls at Wankhede Stadium (14 May 2008)

== Current squad ==
- Players with international caps are listed in **bold**.

Mumbai Indians	Chennai Super Kings
Captains
**Hardik Pandya**	**Ruturaj Gaikwad**
Indian Players
**Rohit Sharma**; **Suryakumar Yadav**; **Tilak Varma**; **Deepak Chahar**; **Jasprit Bumrah**; **KL Shrijith**; **Robin Minz**; **Naman Dhir**; **Raj Angad Bawa**; **Ashwani Kumar**; **Danish Maleshwar**	**MS Dhoni**; **Sanju Samson**; **Kartik Sharma**; **Sarfaraz Khan**; **Urvil Patel**; **Ramakrishna Ghosh**; **Prashant Veer**; **Aman Khan**; **Shivam Dube**; **Khaleel Ahmed**; **Anshul Kamboj**; **Mukesh Choudhary**; **Shreyas Gopal**; **Gurjapneet Singh**; **Rahul Chahar**; **Akash Madhwal**
Overseas Players
**Sherfane Rutherford**; **Ryan Rickelton**; **Quinton de Kock**; **Mitchell Santner**; **Corbin Bosch**; **Will Jacks**; **Trent Boult**; **Allah Ghazanfar**	**Noor Ahmad**; **Jamie Overton**; **Akeal Hosein**; **Nathan Ellis**; **Dewald Brevis**; **Matthew William Short**; **Zak Foulkes**; **Dian Forrester (injury replacement for Jamie Overton during the 2026 IPL season)**; **Matt Henry**; **Spencer Johnson**

== List of players who played for both sides ==
Player	Chennai Super Kings	Mumbai Indians
(Australia) Michael Hussey	2008–2013, 2015	2014
(India) Ajinkya Rahane	2023–2024	2008–2010
(India) Robin Uthappa	2021–2022	2008
(Trinidad and Tobago) Dwayne Bravo	2011–2015, 2018–2022	2008–2010
(India) Harbhajan Singh	2018–2019	2008–2017
(India) Ambati Rayudu	2018–2023	2010–2017
(India) Karn Sharma	2018–2021	2017, 2025
(India) Shreyas Gopal	2025–present	2014–2017, 2024
(India) Deepak Chahar	2018–2024	2025–present
(New Zealand) Mitchell Santner	2018–2024	2025–present
(New Zealand) Jacob Oram	2009–2010	2013
(Barbados) Dwayne Smith	2014–2015	2008, 2010–2013
(New Zealand) Tim Southee	2011	2016–2017
(Sri Lanka) Thisara Perera	2010	2012
(Australia) Ben Hilfenhaus	2012–2014	2015
(India) Ashish Nehra	2014–2015	2008
(India) Parthiv Patel	2008–2010	2015–2017
(Australia) Josh Hazlewood	2020–2021	2014–2015
(Sri Lanka) Akila Dananjaya	2013	2018
(India) Piyush Chawla	2020	2021,2023–2024
(Australia) Jason Behrendorff	2021	2019,2023–2024
(India) Krishnappa Gowtham	2021	2017
(New Zealand) Adam Milne	2022	2021
(India) Simarjeet Singh	2022–2024	2021
(England) Chris Jordan	2022	2023
(India) Anshul Kamboj	2025–present	2024
(Bangladesh) Mustafizur Rahman	2024	2018
(South Africa) Dewald Brevis	2025–present	2022–2024
(India) Shardul Thakur	2018–2021,2024	2026
(India) Rahul Chahar	2026	2019–2021
(India) Akash Madhwal	2026	2023–2024

== See also ==
- List of Indian Premier League rivalries
- List of Chennai Super Kings records
- List of Mumbai Indians records
