= 2015 Indian Premier League final =

- Event: 2015 Indian Premier League
Mumbai Indians	Chennai Super Kings
202/5	161/8
20 overs	20 overs
- Mumbai Indians won by 41 runs
- Date: 24 May 2015
- Venue: Eden Gardens, Kolkata
- Player of the match: Rohit Sharma (MI)
- Umpires: Kumar Dharmasena (SL); Richard Illingworth (Eng)
- Attendance: 67,000

The 2015 Indian Premier League final was a day/night Twenty20 cricket match between the Mumbai Indians and the Chennai Super Kings, played on 24 May 2015, at Eden Gardens, Kolkata. It was held to determine the winner of the 2015 season of the Indian Premier League, the annual professional Twenty20 tournament in India. It was the third time these two teams met in the final, having previously played each other in the 2010 and 2013 finals.

Mumbai defeated Chennai by 41 runs to win their second IPL title, playing in their third IPL final. Their previous IPL victory had come at the same venue against the same opposition in 2013. Chennai were playing their sixth IPL final, attempting to win their third title. Mumbai captain Rohit Sharma was awarded man of the match for his innings of 50. The final was sold out, with a final attendance of around 67,000 people.

== Road to the final ==
=== Group stage ===
Chennai and Mumbai were ranked first and second respectively on the league table. Apart from a defeat to the Rajasthan Royals, Chennai had a successful first half of the league stage, having won six out of seven matches. They suffered a loss of form in the remaining seven games of the second half in which they managed three wins and finished at the top of the table with 18 points. During the league stage, Chennai successfully defended low totals like 150, 134 and 148. Chennai bowlers Dwayne Bravo and Ashish Nehra produced consistent bowling performances throughout the tournament, with the former holding on to the Purple Cap for most wickets during the season. Chennai's most prolific batsman of the season Brendon McCullum had to depart for England on national duty at the conclusion of the league stage.

Mumbai began the season with five defeats in their first six matches, including four on the trot at the start of the season. At this time, their opener Aaron Finch was ruled out of the tournament with an injury, after which Mumbai found success with their new opening combination of Parthiv Patel and Lendl Simmons. They averaged more than 50 for the first wicket, making them the best opening pair of the tournament. Mitchell McClenaghan replaced national teammate Corey Anderson in the playing eleven, after the latter suffered a tournament-ending injury, and formed a formidable bowling attack with Lasith Malinga and Harbhajan Singh. Mumbai went on to win seven of their last eight matches, including five wins in succession, to take the second spot on the league table.

League progression
Team	Group matches														Playoffs		
Team	1	2	3	4	5	6	7	8	9	10	11	12	13	14	Q1/E	Q2	F
Chennai Super Kings	2	4	6	6	8	10	12	12	12	14	14	16	16	18	L	W	L
Mumbai Indians	0	0	0	0	2	2	4	6	8	10	12	12	14	16	W		W

Win	Loss	No result

- Note: The total points at the end of each group match are listed.
- Note: Click on the points (group matches) or W/L (playoffs) to see the match summary.

==== Group stage series ====
17 April (D/N)
Match 12
Scorecard

(H) Mumbai Indians; 183/7 (20 overs)	v	Chennai Super Kings; 189/4 (16.4 overs)

Chennai won by 6 wickets
Wankhede Stadium, Mumbai

8 May (D/N)
Match 43
Scorecard

(H) Chennai Super Kings; 158/5 (20 overs)	v	Mumbai Indians; 159/4 (19.2 overs)

Mumbai won by 6 wickets
M. A. Chidambaram Stadium, Chepauk, Chennai

In the two group stage matches between Mumbai and Chennai, both teams lost at home. In the first meeting at Mumbai, Mumbai initially struggled and were 57 for 4 in the tenth over before captain Rohit Sharma and Kieron Pollard scored half-centuries and shared a partnership of 75 runs in 33 balls to lift the team to a total of 183 for 7. Chennai started strongly in the run-chase with a 109-run opening stand between McCullum and Dwayne Smith. McCullum was dismissed for 46 and soon Smith followed with 62. Suresh Raina then came up with an unbeaten 43 to take Chennai to a six-wicket win. In their second encounter, Chennai could put up a total of 158 for 5 mainly due Pawan Negi's innings of 36 off 17 balls and an unbeaten 39 by captain Mahendra Singh Dhoni. Mumbai were at a strong position of 84 for no loss at the end of their first 10 overs, but were reduced to 86 for 3 after 12. They lost Rohit Sharma in the 18th over and were left with 30 runs to score from the last two overs. Hardik Pandya struck three sixes in the 19th over which yielded 25 runs. Mumbai then sealed the win six wickets and four balls to spare. This was Mumbai's fifth consecutive win of the season and Chennai's first defeat at the Chepauk since 2013.

=== Playoff stage ===
The playoff stage is played according to the page playoff system and provided Chennai and Mumbai, being the top- and second-ranked teams, with two ways of qualifying for the Final. They first faced each other in Qualifier 1 where the winners would qualify for the Final. The losers of Qualifier 1 would play against the winners of the Eliminator in Qualifier 2, the winners of which would also qualify for the Final.

19 May (D/N)
Qualifier 1
Scorecard

(H) Mumbai Indians; 187/6 (20 overs)	v	Chennai Super Kings; 162 (19 overs)

Mumbai won by 25 runs
Wankhede Stadium, Mumbai

In Qualifier 1, Mumbai won the toss and chose to bat first. Mumbai captain Rohit Sharma said the track looked good to bat first and get runs on board, while Dhoni said he wished to bowl first and believed his team could chase down totals. Mumbai's innings began steady with a 90-run opening partnership between Patel and Simmons which ended when Patel was dismissed for 35. After Simmons fell for a 51-ball 65 in the 14th over, Pollard arrived at the crease with the score reading 113 for 2. Even as wickets were falling at the other end, Pollard struck one four and five sixes in his innings of 41 which came off just 17 balls. Mumbai posted a total of 187 for 6 in their 20 overs. Chennai's run-chase started with Smith being dismissed for a duck by Malinga in the first over. They lost the wicket of Michael Hussey in the sixth over and the score read 46/2. Raina and Faf du Plessis then steadied the innings taking Chennai past 80 in the tenth over. In the 11th over, Harbhajan Singh dismissed Raina and Dhoni off consecutive balls. Following this, Chennai started losing wickets at regular intervals and were eventually bowled out for 162.

22 May (D/N)
Qualifier 2
Scorecard

Royal Challengers Bangalore; 139/8 (20 overs)	v	Chennai Super Kings; 140/7 (19.5 overs)

Chennai won by 3 wickets
JSCA International Stadium, Ranchi

Qualifier 2 was played between Chennai and the Royal Challengers Bangalore. Dhoni won the toss and elected to bowl first expecting dew to play a part in the latter stages of the match, while Bangalore captain Virat Kohli wanted to bat first on what he believed was a dry pitch. Bangalore innings started off slowly and R Ashwin was introduced into the attack early with Chris Gayle at the crease. Nehra struck twice in the fifth over picking up the wickets of Kohli and AB de Villiers. After losing another wicket, Bangalore steadied the innings with a 44-run partnership between Gayle and Dinesh Karthik. In the 14th over, Gayle struck two consecutive sixes but, was dismissed caught and bowled by Raina, trying to hit a third. Sarfaraz Khan then played a useful innings of 31 from 21 balls and lifted Bangalore's total to 139 for 8 in 20 overs. In reply, Chennai lost the wicket of Smith early in their innings. In the tenth over, Yuzvendra Chahal claimed the wickets of du Plessis and Raina and the score read 61 for 3. Dhoni then joined Hussey at the crease and the pair put on 47 runs for the fourth wicket, before Hussey was dismissed for 56. Towards the end, Chennai lost three wickets within six balls, but managed to win the match off the penultimate ball of the innings with a single from Ashwin.

== Match ==
=== Background ===
The Final was played at the neutral venue of Eden Gardens, Kolkata. The 2013 Final between these two teams was also played at this venue where Mumbai had defeated Chennai by 23 runs to win their first IPL title. This was the seventh encounter between these two teams in the knockout/playoff stage of IPL, with Chennai leading 4–2 in such matches prior to this game.

Chennai had the tournament's leading wicket-taker Dwayne Bravo in their ranks but were without their best batsman of the season Brendon McCullum, who was playing for New Zealand in England. Mumbai's leading run-scorer Lendl Simmons was 90 runs behind the Orange Cap holder, while their leading bowler Lasith Malinga was two wickets behind Bravo on the Purple Cap list.

=== Report ===
The toss was won by Chennai who chose to bowl first. Their captain Mahendra Singh Dhoni described the pitch as being dry and predicted it would stay the same throughout the match. Mumbai captain Rohit Sharma said he wanted to bat first and post a good total to defend. Both teams were unchanged from their respective previous matches.

Mumbai's innings began with opener Parthiv Patel being dismissed run out for a duck in the first over. Rohit Sharma then joined Lendl Simmons at the crease and started aggressively, scoring 16 runs from the second over by Mohit Sharma. The duo of Simmons and Sharma continued to attack the Super Kings bowlers with the former reaching his sixth half-century of the season. Dwayne Bravo was introduced into the attack in the 12th over and Sharma was dismissed soon after completing his fifty which had come off just 24 balls. Dwayne Smith then claimed the wicket of Simmons in the first ball of the following over, which was also Smith's first ball of the season. Mumbai were at 120 for 3 in the 13th over, before Kieron Pollard and Ambati Rayudu struck boundaries at regular intervals, with the former striking three sixes and a four in the 17th over by Ashish Nehra. Their partnership had reached 71 runs in less than seven overs before Mohit Sharma dismissed Pollard off the final ball of the 19th over. Mumbai lost Hardik Pandya for a duck in the final over, but were able to post 202 for 5 by the end of their innings. This was the second 200-plus total in an IPL final.

Chennai's run-chase got off to a slow start as Smith was struggling to time the ball. Mitchell McClenaghan dismissed Michael Hussey in the fifth over for 4. Suresh Raina then arrived at the crease and Smith started to score boundaries. Their partnership had reached 66 runs and was broken when Harbhajan Singh dismissed Smith for 57 in the 12th over. Harbhajan got the wicket Raina in his next over, after which Chennai lost a wicket in each of their following five overs with the required run rate increasing after every over. McClenaghan and Lasith Malinga bowled economically in each of their four overs and had figures of 3 for 25 and 2 for 25 respectively. Ravindra Jadeja and Mohit Sharma added 24 runs for the ninth wicket but their 20 overs ended 41 runs short of the target.

=== Summary ===
It was Mumbai's second IPL title, making them the third team after the Super Kings and Kolkata Knight Riders to have won the IPL title more than once. Rohit Sharma was awarded man of the match for his 26-ball 50. With 26 wickets in the tournament, Bravo finished as the leading wicket-taker and won the Purple Cap for the second time after the 2013 season. Mumbai won a prize money of ₹15 crore for becoming the champions, while runners-up Chennai were awarded ₹10 crore. Chennai also won the Fair Play Award, while Mumbai were at the bottom of this table.

== Scorecard ==
- On-field umpires: Kumar Dharmasena (SL) and Richard Illingworth (Eng)
- TV umpire: Vineet Kulkarni (Ind)
- Reserve umpire: C. K. Nandan (Ind)
- Match referee: Ranjan Madugalle (SL)

Toss: Chennai Super Kings won the toss and elected to field.

Mumbai Indians innings
Player	Status	Runs	Balls	4s	6s	Strike rate
Lendl Simmons	b Smith	68	45	8	3	151.11
Parthiv Patel^{†}	run out (du Plessis)	0	3	0	0	0.00
Rohit Sharma*	c Jadeja b Bravo	50	26	6	2	192.30
Kieron Pollard	c Raina b M Sharma	36	18	2	3	200.00
Ambati Rayudu	not out	36	24	0	3	150.00
Hardik Pandya	c Raina b Bravo	0	2	0	0	0.00
Harbhajan Singh	not out	6	3	0	1	200.00
Jagadeesha Suchith						
Vinay Kumar						
Lasith Malinga						
Mitchell McClenaghan						
Extras	(b 1, lb 4, nb 1)	6				
Total	(5 wickets; 20 overs)	202				

Fall of wickets: 1–1 (Patel, 0.5 ov), 2–120 (Sharma, 11.6 ov), 3–120 (Simmons, 12.1 ov), 4–191 (Pollard, 18.5 ov), 5–191 (Pandya, 19.2 ov)

Chennai Super Kings bowling
Bowler	Overs	Maidens	Runs	Wickets	Econ	Wides	NBs
Ashish Nehra	4	0	41	0	10.25	0	0
Mohit Sharma	4	0	38	1	9.50	0	0
Ravichandran Ashwin	2	0	21	0	10.50	0	1
Ravindra Jadeja	2	0	26	0	13.00	0	0
Pawan Negi	2	0	18	1	9.00	0	0
Dwayne Bravo	4	0	36	2	9.00	0	0
Dwayne Smith	2	0	17	1	8.50	0	0

Chennai Super Kings innings
Player	Status	Runs	Balls	4s	6s	Strike rate
Dwayne Smith	lbw b Harbhajan Singh	57	48	9	1	118.75
Michael Hussey	c Suchith b McClenaghan	4	9	1	0	44.44
Suresh Raina	st ^{†}Patel b Harbhajan Singh	28	19	3	1	147.36
Mahendra Singh Dhoni*^{†}	b Malinga	18	13	1	1	138.46
Dwayne Bravo	c Simmons b McClenaghan	9	6	0	1	150.00
Pawan Negi	c Pandya b Malinga	3	5	0	0	60.00
Faf du Plessis	c R Sharma b Kumar	1	3	0	0	33.33
Ravindra Jadeja	not out	11	8	1	0	137.50
Ravichandran Ashwin	c Suchith b McClenaghan	2	4	0	0	50.00
Mohit Sharma	not out	21	7	1	2	300.00
Ashish Nehra						
Extras	(lb 2, w 3, nb 2)	7				
Total	(8 wickets; 20 overs)	161				

Fall of wickets: 1–22 (Hussey, 4.4 ov), 2–88 (Smith, 11.5 ov), 3–99 (Raina, 13.3 ov), 4–108 (Bravo, 14.3 ov), 5–124 (Dhoni, 15.5 ov), 6–125 (du Plessis, 16.2 ov), 7–134 (Negi, 17.3 ov), 8–137 (Ashwin, 18.2 ov)

Mumbai Indians bowling
Bowler	Overs	Maidens	Runs	Wickets	Econ	Wides	NBs
Lasith Malinga	4	0	25	2	6.25	1	1
Mitchell McClenaghan	4	0	25	3	6.25	0	0
Vinay Kumar	4	0	39	1	9.75	1	0
Hardik Pandya	4	0	36	0	9.00	0	1
Harbhajan Singh	4	0	34	2	8.50	1	0

== See also ==
- Chennai Super Kings–Mumbai Indians rivalry
