= 2015 Indian Premier League =

Cricket tournament

- Dates: 8 April 2015 – 24 May 2015
- Administrator: Board of Control for Cricket in India
- Cricket format: Twenty20
- Tournament format(s): Double round robin and playoffs
- Champions: Mumbai Indians (2nd title)
- Runners-up: Chennai Super Kings
- Participants: 8
- Matches: 60
- Most valuable player: Andre Russell (KKR)
- Most runs: David Warner (SRH) (562)
- Most wickets: Dwayne Bravo (CSK) (26)
- Official website: www.iplt20.com

The 2015 Indian Premier League season (also known as IPL 8 or, for sponsorship reasons, Pepsi IPL 2015) was the eighth season of the Indian Premier League, a Twenty20 cricket league established by the Board of Control for Cricket in India (BCCI) in 2007. The tournament featured eight teams and was held from 8 April 2015 to 24 May 2015. The tournament's opening ceremony was held at the Eden Gardens in Kolkata on 7 April 2015. Kolkata Knight Riders were the defending champions having won the title in the 2014 season.

On 24 May 2015, Mumbai Indians defeated Chennai Super Kings by 41 runs in the final at Eden Gardens, Kolkata, to win the IPL title for the second time. Mumbai captain Rohit Sharma was awarded player of the match in the final for his knock of 50 from 26 balls. Andre Russell of the Kolkata Knight Riders was named Most Valuable Player (MVP) of the season. This was the last time that Sony Television Network broadcast the tournament before Star Sports Network took the broadcasting rights from the 8th season and are currently bearing the broadcasting rights for the tournament.

== Players auction ==
The eight franchises retained a total of 123 players for the 2015 IPL season before moving into the auction. The released players were provided an option to register themselves for auction. Six players were traded across teams before the auction took place. At the 2015 IPL auction held on 16 February at Bangalore, Yuvraj Singh was sold to Delhi Daredevils for ₹16 crore, a record bid in IPL auction history. A total of 67 players were sold out in the auction and the franchises spent a total of ₹87.60 crore to buy the players.

== Officials ==
The 2015 IPL season saw 26 match officials, 13 Indian umpires and four match referees officiating. 26 match officials (umpires and referees) participated in a two-day workshop, organised by the BCCI, in preparation for the 2015 IPL season. The workshop was held at the Cricket Centre, Mumbai, on 4 and 5 April 2015, from 9am to 5pm.

== Venues ==
12 venues were selected to host the league stage matches. Mumbai, Pune and Ranchi hosted Qualifier 1, Eliminator and Qualifier 2 respectively and Kolkata hosted the Final.

Group stage

Ahmedabad	Bangalore	Chennai	Delhi
Rajasthan Royals	Royal Challengers Bangalore	Chennai Super Kings	Delhi Daredevils
Sardar Patel Stadium	M. Chinnaswamy Stadium	M. A. Chidambaram Stadium	Feroz Shah Kotla
Capacity: 54,000	Capacity: 36,760	Capacity: 37,220	Capacity: 55,000
Hyderabad	2015 Indian Premier League is located in India		Kolkata
Sunrisers Hyderabad	2015 Indian Premier League is located in India		Kolkata Knight Riders
Rajiv Gandhi International Cricket Stadium	2015 Indian Premier League is located in India		Eden Gardens
Capacity: 55,000	2015 Indian Premier League is located in India		Capacity: 67,000
Mohali	2015 Indian Premier League is located in India		Mumbai
Kings XI Punjab	2015 Indian Premier League is located in India		Mumbai Indians
Punjab Cricket Association Stadium	2015 Indian Premier League is located in India		Wankhede Stadium
Capacity: 40,000	2015 Indian Premier League is located in India		Capacity: 33,320
Mumbai	Pune	Raipur	Vishakhapatnam
Rajasthan Royals	Kings XI Punjab	Delhi Daredevils	Sunrisers Hyderabad
Brabourne Stadium	Maharashtra Cricket Association Stadium	Raipur International Cricket Stadium	ACA-VDCA Stadium
Capacity: 20,000	Capacity: 36,000	Capacity: 50,000	Capacity: 38,000

Playoffs

Kolkata	2015 Indian Premier League is located in India	Mumbai
Final	2015 Indian Premier League is located in India	Qualifier 1
Eden Gardens	2015 Indian Premier League is located in India	Wankhede Stadium
Capacity: 67,000	2015 Indian Premier League is located in India	Capacity: 33,320
Pune	2015 Indian Premier League is located in India	Ranchi
Eliminator	2015 Indian Premier League is located in India	Qualifier 2
Maharashtra Cricket Association Stadium	2015 Indian Premier League is located in India	JSCA International Cricket Stadium
Capacity: 36,000	2015 Indian Premier League is located in India	Capacity: 39,000

== IPL Fanpark initiative ==
BCCI started a new initiative IPL Fanpark to spread the reach of IPL across the country. As a part of the initiative, IPL was made available in the stadiums across 15 cities, apart from the 12 venues hosting the matches, on a large screen. The access to these stadiums was free and based on first-come first-served basis.

== Opening ceremony ==
The opening ceremony was held at the Salt Lake Stadium in Kolkata, on 7 April 2015. The captains of all eight teams signed the "MCC Spirit of Cricket" pledge. The ceremony featured live performances of Hrithik Roshan, Anushka Sharma, Farhan Akhtar, Shahid Kapoor among others. The ceremony began after a one and a half hours delay due to rain.

== Teams and standings ==
=== Points table ===
Pos	Team	Pld	W	L	NR	Pts	NRR
1	Chennai Super Kings (R)	14	9	5	0	18	0.709
2	Mumbai Indians (C)	14	8	6	0	16	−0.043
3	Royal Challengers Bangalore (3)	14	7	5	2	16	1.037
4	Rajasthan Royals (4)	14	7	5	2	16	0.062
5	Kolkata Knight Riders	14	7	6	1	15	0.253
6	Sunrisers Hyderabad	14	7	7	0	14	−0.239
7	Delhi Daredevils	14	5	8	1	11	−0.049
8	Kings XI Punjab	14	3	11	0	6	−1.436

- Top 4 teams were qualified for the playoffs
- advanced to the Qualifier
- advanced to the Eliminator

("C" refers to the "Champions" of the Tournament. 'R'(2nd Position), '3' and '4' are the positions of the respective teams in the tournament.)

== League stage ==
Team	Group matches														Playoffs			
Team	1	2	3	4	5	6	7	8	9	10	11	12	13	14	Q1	E	Q2	F
Chennai Super Kings	2	4	6	6	8	10	12	12	12	14	14	16	16	18	L		W	L
Delhi Daredevils	0	0	2	4	4	6	6	8	8	8	8	8	10	11				
Kings XI Punjab	0	2	2	2	4	4	4	4	4	4	4	4	6	6				
Kolkata Knight Riders	2	2	4	6	6	7	7	9	9	11	13	15	15	15				
Mumbai Indians	0	0	0	0	2	2	4	6	8	10	12	12	14	16	W			W
Rajasthan Royals	2	4	6	8	10	10	10	11	12	12	14	14	14	16		L		
Royal Challengers Bengaluru	2	2	2	2	4	6	7	9	9	11	13	13	15	16		W	L	
Sunrisers Hyderabad	0	2	2	2	4	4	6	8	8	10	12	14	14	14				

Win	Loss	No result

- Note: The total points at the end of each group match are listed.
- Note: Click on the points (group matches) or W/L (playoffs) to see the match summary.

Visitor team →	CSK	DD	KXIP	KKR	MI	RR	RCB	SRH
Home team ↓	CSK	DD	KXIP	KKR	MI	RR	RCB	SRH
Chennai Super Kings		Chennai; 1 run	Chennai; 97 runs	Chennai; 2 runs	Mumbai; 6 wickets	Chennai; 12 runs	Chennai; 24 runs	Chennai; 45 runs
Delhi Daredevils	Delhi; 6 wickets		Delhi; 9 wickets	Kolkata; 6 wickets	Delhi; 37 runs	Rajasthan; 3 wickets	Bengaluru; 10 wickets	Hyderabad; 6 runs
Kings XI Punjab	Chennai; 7 wickets	Delhi; 5 wickets		Kolkata; 4 wickets	Mumbai; 23 runs	Rajasthan; 26 runs	Punjab; 22 runs	Hyderabad; 20 runs
Kolkata Knight Riders	Kolkata; 7 wickets	Kolkata; 13 runs	Kolkata; 1 wicket		Kolkata; 7 wickets	Match abandoned	Bengaluru; 3 wickets	Kolkata; 35 runs
Mumbai Indians	Chennai; 6 wickets	Mumbai; 5 wickets	Punjab; 18 runs	Mumbai; 5 runs		Mumbai; 8 runs	Bengaluru; 39 runs	Mumbai; 20 runs
Rajasthan Royals	Rajasthan; 8 wickets	Rajasthan; 14 runs	Punjab; Super Over	Rajasthan; 9 runs	Rajasthan; 7 wickets		Bengaluru; 9 wickets	Hyderabad; 7 runs
Royal Challengers Bengaluru	Chennai; 27 runs	Match abandoned	Bengaluru; 138 runs	Bengaluru; 7 wickets	Mumbai; 18 runs	Match abandoned		Hyderabad; 8 wickets
Sunrisers Hyderabad	Hyderabad; 22 runs	Delhi; 4 runs	Hyderabad; 5 runs	Hyderabad; 16 runs (D/L)	Mumbai; 9 wickets	Rajasthan; 6 wickets	Bengaluru; 6 wickets (D/L)	

Home team won	Visitor team won

- Note: Results listed are according to the home (horizontal) and visitor (vertical) teams.
- Note: Click on a result to see a summary of the match.

=== Matches ===
8 April
20:00 (D/N)
Scorecard

Mumbai Indians; 168/3 (20 overs)	v	Kolkata Knight Riders (H); 170/3 (18.3 overs)
Rohit Sharma 98* (65); Morne Morkel 2/18 (4 overs)		Gautam Gambhir 57 (43); Corey Anderson 1/21 (2 overs)

Kolkata Knight Riders won by 7 wickets
Eden Gardens, Kolkata
Umpires: S Ravi (Ind) and Chettithody Shamshuddin (Ind)
Player of the match: Morne Morkel (KKR)

- Kolkata Knight Riders won the toss and elected to field.

9 April
20:00 (D/N)
Scorecard

(H) Chennai Super Kings; 150/7 (20 overs)	v	Delhi Daredevils; 149/9 (20 overs)
Dwayne Smith 34 (31); Nathan Coulter-Nile 3/30 (4 overs)		Albie Morkel 73* (55); Ashish Nehra 3/25 (4 overs)

Chennai Super Kings won by 1 run
M A Chidambaram Stadium, Chennai
Umpires: Richard Illingworth (Eng) and Vineet Kulkarni (Ind)
Player of the match: Ashish Nehra (CSK)

- Delhi Daredevils won the toss and elected to field.
- Shreyas Iyer and Domnic Joseph made their IPL debuts.

10 April
20:00 (D/N)
Scorecard

Rajasthan Royals; 162/7 (20 overs)	v	Kings XI Punjab (H); 136/8 (20 overs)
James Faulkner 46 (33); Anureet Singh 3/23 (4 overs)		Murali Vijay 37 (32); James Faulkner 3/26 (4 overs)

Rajasthan Royals won by 26 runs
MCA Stadium, Pune
Umpires: Simon Fry (Aus) and Chris Gaffaney (NZ)
Player of the match: James Faulkner (RR)

- Kings XI Punjab won the toss and elected to field.
- Deepak Hooda made his IPL debut.

11 April
16:00 (D/N)
Scorecard

(H) Chennai Super Kings; 209/4 (20 overs)	v	Sunrisers Hyderabad; 164/6 (20 overs)
Brendon McCullum 100* (56); Trent Boult 1/34 (4 overs)		David Warner 53 (42); Dwayne Bravo 2/25 (4 overs)

Chennai Super Kings won by 45 runs
M A Chidambaram Stadium, Chennai
Umpires: Richard Illingworth (Eng) and Vineet Kulkarni (Ind)
Player of the match: Brendon McCullum (CSK)

- Chennai Super Kings won the toss and elected to bat.
- Kane Williamson and Trent Boult made their IPL debuts.

11 April
20:00 (D/N)
Scorecard

(H) Kolkata Knight Riders; 177/6 (20 overs)	v	Royal Challengers Bangalore; 179/7 (19 overs)
Gautam Gambhir 58 (46); Abu Nechim, Yuzvendra Chahal 1/28 (4 overs)		Chris Gayle 96 (56); Yusuf Pathan 2/40 (4 overs)

Royal Challengers Bangalore won by 3 wickets
Eden Gardens, Kolkata
Umpires: S Ravi (Ind) and Chettithody Shamshuddin (Ind)
Player of the match: Chris Gayle (RCB)

- Royal Challengers Bangalore won the toss and elected to field.
- KC Cariappa and Sean Abbott made their IPL debuts.

12 April
16:00 (D/N)
Scorecard

(H) Delhi Daredevils; 184/3 (20 overs)	v	Rajasthan Royals; 186/7 (20 overs)
JP Duminy 44* (38); Chris Morris 2/35 (4 overs)		Deepak Hooda 54 (25); Imran Tahir 4/28 (4 overs)

Rajasthan Royals won by 3 wickets
Feroz Shah Kotla Ground, Delhi
Umpires: Simon Fry (Aus) and Chris Gaffaney (NZ)
Player of the match: Deepak Hooda (RR)

- Rajasthan Royals won the toss and elected to field.

12 April
20:00 (D/N)
Scorecard

Kings XI Punjab; 177/5 (20 overs)	v	Mumbai Indians (H); 159/7 (20 overs)
George Bailey 61* (32); Harbhajan Singh 2/20 (4 overs)		Harbhajan Singh 64 (24); Mitchell Johnson 2/23 (4 overs)

Kings XI Punjab won by 18 runs
Wankhede Stadium, Mumbai
Umpires: Anil Chaudhary (Ind) and Krishnamachari Srinivasan (Ind)
Player of the match: George Bailey (KXIP)

- Mumbai Indians won the toss and elected to field.
- Jagadeesha Suchith made his IPL debut.

13 April
20:00 (D/N)
Scorecard

(H) Royal Challengers Bangalore; 166 (19.5 overs)	v	Sunrisers Hyderabad; 172/2 (17.2 overs)
AB de Villiers 46 (28); Trent Boult 3/36 (4 overs)		David Warner 57 (27); Yuzvendra Chahal 2/28 (4 overs)

Sunrisers Hyderabad won by 8 wickets
M Chinnaswamy Stadium, Bangalore
Umpires: Rajesh Deshpande (Ind) and Richard Illingworth (Eng)
Player of the match: David Warner (SRH)

- Sunrisers Hyderabad won the toss and elected to field.

14 April
20:00 (D/N)
Scorecard

Mumbai Indians; 164/5 (20 overs)	v	Rajasthan Royals (H); 165/3 (19.1 overs)
Kieron Pollard 70 (34); Stuart Binny 1/8 (2 overs)		Steve Smith 79* (53); Vinay Kumar 1/13 (3 overs)

Rajasthan Royals won by 7 wickets
Sardar Patel Stadium, Ahmedabad
Umpires: Anil Chaudhary (Ind) and Simon Fry (Aus)
Player of the match: Steve Smith (RR)

- Mumbai Indians won the toss and elected to bat.

15 April
20:00 (D/N)
Scorecard

(H) Kings XI Punjab; 165/7 (20 overs)	v	Delhi Daredevils; 169/5 (19.5 overs)
Virender Sehwag 47 (41); Imran Tahir 3/43 (4 overs)		Mayank Agarwal 68 (48); Anureet Singh 2/33 (4 overs)

Delhi Daredevils won by 5 wickets
MCA Stadium, Pune
Umpires: Chris Gaffaney (NZ) and Krishnamachari Srinivasan (Ind)
Player of the match: Mayank Agarwal (DD)

- Kings XI Punjab won the toss and elected to bat.

16 April
20:00 (D/N)
Scorecard

(H) Sunrisers Hyderabad; 127/5 (20 overs)	v	Rajasthan Royals; 131/4 (20 overs)
Eoin Morgan 27 (30); Dhawal Kulkarni 2/9 (3 overs)		Ajinkya Rahane 62 (56); Ravi Bopara 2/18 (4 overs)

Rajasthan Royals won by 6 wickets
ACA-VDCA Stadium, Visakhapatnam
Umpires: Pashchim Pathak (Ind) and S Ravi (Ind)
Player of the match: Ajinkya Rahane (RR)

- Rajasthan Royals won the toss and elected to field.

17 April
20:00 (D/N)
Scorecard

(H) Mumbai Indians; 183/7 (20 overs)	v	Chennai Super Kings; 189/4 (16.4 overs)
Kieron Pollard 64 (30); Ashish Nehra 3/23 (4 overs)		Dwayne Smith 62 (30); Harbhajan Singh 2/44 (4 overs)

Chennai Super Kings won by 6 wickets
Wankhede Stadium, Mumbai
Umpires: Anil Chaudhary (Ind) and Marais Erasmus (SA)
Player of the match: Ashish Nehra (CSK)

- Mumbai Indians won the toss and elected to bat.

18 April
16:00 (D/N)
Scorecard

Delhi Daredevils; 167/4 (20 overs)	v	Sunrisers Hyderabad (H); 163/8 (20 overs)
Shreyas Iyer 60 (40); Bhuvneshwar Kumar 1/21 (4 overs)		Ravi Bopara 41 (30); JP Duminy 4/17 (3 overs)

Delhi Daredevils won by 4 runs
ACA-VDCA Stadium, Visakhapatnam
Umpires: Pashchim Pathak (Ind) and S Ravi (Ind)
Player of the match: JP Duminy (DD)

- Delhi Daredevils won the toss and elected to bat.

18 April
20:00 (D/N)
Scorecard

(H) Kings XI Punjab; 155/9 (20 overs)	v	Kolkata Knight Riders; 159/6 (17.5 overs)
George Bailey 60 (45); Umesh Yadav 3/33 (4 overs)		Andre Russell 66 (36); Sandeep Sharma 4/25 (4 overs)

Kolkata Knight Riders won by 4 wickets
MCA Stadium, Pune
Umpires: Simon Fry (Aus) and CK Nandan (Ind)
Player of the match: Andre Russell (KKR)

- Kolkata Knight Riders won the toss and elected to field.

19 April
16:00 (D/N)
Scorecard

Chennai Super Kings; 156/4 (20 overs)	v	Rajasthan Royals (H); 157/2 (18.2 overs)
Dwayne Bravo 62* (36); Chris Morris 1/19 (4 overs)		Ajinkya Rahane 76* (55); Ravindra Jadeja 1/29 (4 overs)

Rajasthan Royals won by 8 wickets
Sardar Patel Stadium, Ahmedabad
Umpires: Marais Erasmus (SA) and Anil Chaudhary (Ind)
Player of the match: Ajinkya Rahane (RR)

- Chennai Super Kings won the toss and elected to bat.

19 April
20:00 (D/N)
Scorecard

Mumbai Indians; 209/7 (20 overs)	v	Royal Challengers Bangalore (H); 191/7 (20 overs)
Lendl Simmons 59 (44); David Wiese 4/33 (4 overs)		David Wiese 47* (25); Harbhajan Singh 3/27 (4 overs)

Mumbai Indians won by 18 runs
M Chinnaswamy Stadium, Bangalore
Umpires: Richard Illingworth (Eng) and Vineet Kulkarni (Ind)
Player of the match: Harbhajan Singh (MI)

- Royal Challengers Bangalore won the toss and elected to field.
- Hardik Pandya, Mitchell McClenaghan and David Wiese made their IPL debuts.
- The 20 wides bowled during the match are a record in the IPL

20 April
20:00 (D/N)
Scorecard

(H) Delhi Daredevils; 146/8 (20 overs)	v	Kolkata Knight Riders; 147/4 (18.1 overs)
Manoj Tiwary 32 (28); Umesh Yadav 2/18 (4 overs)		Gautam Gambhir 60 (49); Domnic Joseph 2/18 (3 overs)

Kolkata Knight Riders won by 6 wickets
Feroz Shah Kotla Ground, Delhi
Umpires: Simon Fry (Aus) and Chris Gaffaney (NZ)
Player of the match: Umesh Yadav (KKR)

- Kolkata Knight Riders won the toss and elected to field.

21 April
20:00 (D/N)
Scorecard

(H) Rajasthan Royals; 191/6 (20 overs)	v	Kings XI Punjab; 191/6 (20 overs)
Ajinkya Rahane 74 (54); Axar Patel 2/30 (4 overs)		Shaun Marsh 65 (40); Pravin Tambe 1/20 (3 overs)

Match tied, Kings XI Punjab won by Super Over
Sardar Patel Stadium, Ahmedabad
Umpires: Marais Erasmus (SA) and S Ravi (Ind)
Player of the match: Shaun Marsh (KXIP)

- Kings XI Punjab won the toss and elected to field.

22 April
16:00 (D/N)
Scorecard

(H) Sunrisers Hyderabad; 176/4 (20 overs)	v	Kolkata Knight Riders; 101/4 (12 overs)
David Warner 91 (55); Morne Morkel 2/31 (4 overs)		Robin Uthappa 34 (21); Ravi Bopara 1/7 (1 over)

Sunrisers Hyderabad won by 16 runs (D/L method)
ACA-VDCA Stadium, Visakhapatnam
Umpires: Richard Illingworth (Eng) and Vineet Kulkarni (Ind)
Player of the match: David Warner (SRH)

- Kolkata Knight Riders won the toss and elected to field.
- Due to rain, Kolkata's target was adjusted to 118 runs from 12 overs via Duckworth-Lewis method.
- David Warner made the highest score by a Hyderabad batsman.
- David Warner and Shikhar Dhawan's 130 run partnership was the highest partnership for any wicket by Hyderabad.

22 April
20:00 (D/N)
Scorecard

Chennai Super Kings; 181/8 (20 overs)	v	Royal Challengers Bangalore (H); 154/8 (20 overs)
Suresh Raina 62 (32); Yuzvendra Chahal 3/40 (4 overs)		Virat Kohli 51 (42); Ashish Nehra 4/10 (4 overs)

Chennai Super Kings won by 27 runs
M Chinnaswamy Stadium, Bangalore
Umpires: Johan Cloete (SA) and Chettithody Shamshuddin (Ind)
Player of the match: Suresh Raina (CSK)

- Royal Challengers Bangalore won the toss and elected to field.
- Sarfaraz Khan made his IPL debut.

23 April
20:00 (D/N)
Scorecard

(H) Delhi Daredevils; 190/4 (20 overs)	v	Mumbai Indians; 153/9 (20 overs)
Shreyas Iyer 83 (56); Mitchell McClenaghan 2/38 (4 overs)		Ambati Rayudu 30 (22); Imran Tahir 3/22 (4 overs)

Delhi Daredevils won by 37 runs
Ferozshah Kotla, Delhi
Umpires: Simon Fry (Aus) and CK Nandan (Ind)
Player of the match: Shreyas Iyer (DD)

- Mumbai Indians won the toss and elected to field.

24 April
20:00 (D/N)
Scorecard

(H) Rajasthan Royals; 130/9 (20 overs)	v	Royal Challengers Bangalore; 134/1 (16.1 overs)
Steve Smith 31 (28); Mitchell Starc 3/22 (4 overs)		Virat Kohli 62* (46); Shane Watson 1/23 (3 overs)

Royal Challengers Bangalore won by 9 wickets
Sardar Patel Stadium, Ahmedabad
Umpires: Marais Erasmus (SA) and S Ravi (Ind)
Player of the match: Mitchell Starc (RCB)

- Royal Challengers Bangalore won the toss and elected to field.

25 April
16:00 (D/N)
Scorecard

(H) Mumbai Indians; 157/8 (20 overs)	v	Sunrisers Hyderabad; 137/8 (20 overs)
Lendl Simmons 51 (42); Bhuvneshwar Kumar 3/26 (4 overs)		Shikhar Dhawan 42 (29); Lasith Malinga 4/23 (4 overs)

Mumbai Indians won by 20 runs
Wankhede Stadium, Mumbai
Umpires: Kumar Dharmasena (SL) and Chris Gaffaney (NZ)
Player of the match: Lasith Malinga (MI)

- Mumbai Indians won the toss and elected to bat.

25 April
20:00 (D/N)
Scorecard

(H) Chennai Super Kings; 192/3 (20 overs)	v	Kings XI Punjab; 95/9 (20 overs)
Brendon McCullum 66 (44); Axar Patel 1/35 (4 overs)		Murali Vijay 34 (32); Ravindra Jadeja 3/22 (4 overs)

Chennai Super Kings won by 97 runs
M A Chidambaram Stadium, Chennai
Umpires: Johan Cloete (SA) and Chettithody Shamshuddin (Ind)
Player of the match: Brendon McCullum (CSK)

- Chennai Super Kings won the toss and elected to bat.

26 April
16:00 (D/N)
Scorecard

(H) Kolkata Knight Riders	v	Rajasthan Royals

No result
Eden Gardens, Kolkata
Umpires: Rajesh Deshpande (Ind) and Richard Illingworth (Eng)

- No toss.
- Match abandoned without a toss due to rain.

26 April
20:00 (D/N)
Scorecard

(H) Delhi Daredevils; 95 (18.2 overs)	v	Royal Challengers Bangalore; 99/0 (10.3 overs)
Kedar Jadhav 33 (29); Mitchell Starc 3/20 (4 overs)		Chris Gayle 62* (40)

Royal Challengers Bangalore won by 10 wickets
Ferozshah Kotla, Delhi
Umpires: Marais Erasmus (SA) and S Ravi (Ind)
Player of the match: Varun Aaron (RCB)

- Royal Challengers Bangalore won the toss and elected to field.

27 April
20:00 (D/N)
Scorecard

Sunrisers Hyderabad; 150/6 (20 overs)	v	Kings XI Punjab (H); 130/9 (20 overs)
David Warner 58 (41); Axar Patel 2/25 (4 overs)		Wriddhiman Saha 42 (33); Trent Boult 3/19 (4 overs)

Sunrisers Hyderabad won by 20 runs
Punjab Cricket Association Stadium, Mohali
Umpires: Kumar Dharmasena (SL) and Chris Gaffaney (NZ)
Player of the match: Trent Boult (SRH)

- Kings XI Punjab won the toss and elected to field.

28 April
20:00 (D/N)
Scorecard

(H) Chennai Super Kings; 134/6 (20 overs)	v	Kolkata Knight Riders; 132/9 (20 overs)
Faf du Plessis 29* (29); Andre Russell, Piyush Chawla 2/26 (4 overs)		Robin Uthappa 39 (17); Dwayne Bravo 3/22 (3 overs)

Chennai Super Kings won by 2 runs
M A Chidambaram Stadium, Chennai
Umpires: Rajesh Deshpande (Ind) and Vineet Kulkarni (Ind)
Player of the match: Dwayne Bravo (CSK)

- Kolkata Knight Riders won the toss and elected to field.

29 April
20:00 (D/N)
Scorecard

(H) Royal Challengers Bangalore; 200/7 (20 overs)	v	Rajasthan Royals
AB de Villiers 57 (45); Tim Southee 2/32 (4 overs)

No result
M Chinnaswamy Stadium, Bangalore
Umpires: Johanes Cloete (SA) and Pashchim Pathak (Ind)

- Rajasthan Royals won the toss and elected to field.
- Match abandoned after end of Bangalore innings due to rain.

30 April
20:00 (D/N)
Scorecard

Chennai Super Kings; 165/9 (20 overs)	v	Kolkata Knight Riders (H); 169/3 (19.5 overs)
Brendon McCullum 32 (12); Brad Hogg 4/29 (4 overs)		Robin Uthappa 80* (58); Mohit Sharma 1/22 (4 overs)

Kolkata Knight Riders won by 7 wickets
Eden Gardens, Kolkata
Umpires: Anil Chaudhary (Ind) and Marais Erasmus (SA)
Player of the match: Andre Russell (KKR)

- Kolkata Knight Riders won the toss and elected to field.
- Ronit More made his IPL debut.

1 May
16:00 (D/N)
Scorecard

Kings XI Punjab; 118/8 (20 overs)	v	Delhi Daredevils (H); 119/1 (13.5 overs)
David Miller 42 (41); Nathan Coulter-Nile 4/20 (4 overs)		Shreyas Iyer 54 (40); Shardul Thakur 1/38 (3 overs)

Delhi Daredevils won by 9 wickets
Ferozshah Kotla, Delhi
Umpires: Richard Illingworth (Eng) and S Ravi (Ind)
Player of the match: Nathan Coulter-Nile (DD)

- Delhi Daredevils won the toss and elected to field.
- Shardul Thakur made his IPL debut.

1 May
20:00 (D/N)
Scorecard

(H) Mumbai Indians; 187/5 (20 overs)	v	Rajasthan Royals; 179/7 (20 overs)
Ambati Rayudu 53* (27); Dhawal Kulkarni 2/26 (3 overs)		Sanju Samson 76 (46); Mitchell McClenaghan 3/31 (4 overs)

Mumbai Indians won by 8 runs
Wankhede Stadium, Mumbai
Umpires: Kumar Dharmasena (SL) and CK Nandan (Ind)
Player of the match: Ambati Rayudu (MI)

- Rajasthan Royals won the toss and elected to field.

2 May
16:00 (D/N)
Scorecard

Kolkata Knight Riders; 111/4 (10 overs)	v	Royal Challengers Bangalore (H); 115/3 (9.4 overs)
Andre Russell 45 (17); Mitchell Starc 1/15 (2 overs)		Mandeep Singh 45* (18); Brad Hogg 1/23 (2 overs)

Royal Challengers Bangalore won by 7 wickets
M Chinnaswamy Stadium, Bangalore
Umpires: Johanes Cloete (SA) and Pashchim Pathak (Ind)
Player of the match: Mandeep Singh (RCB)

- Royal Challengers Bangalore won the toss and elected to field.
- Match reduced to 10 overs per side due to rain.

2 May
20:00 (D/N)
Scorecard

(H) Sunrisers Hyderabad; 192/7 (20 overs)	v	Chennai Super Kings; 170/6 (20 overs)
David Warner 61 (28); Dwayne Bravo 3/25 (4 overs)		Faf du Plessis 33 (22); Moises Henriques 2/20 (4 overs)

Sunrisers Hyderabad won by 22 runs
Rajiv Gandhi International Cricket Stadium, Hyderabad
Umpires: Anil Chaudhary (Ind) and Krishnamachari Srinivasan (Ind)
Player of the match: David Warner (SRH)

- Chennai Super Kings won the toss and elected to field.

3 May
16:00 (D/N)
Scorecard

Mumbai Indians; 172/3 (20 overs)	v	Kings XI Punjab (H); 149/7 (20 overs)
Lendl Simmons 71 (56); Anureet Singh, Karanveer Singh 1/30 (4 overs)		David Miller 43 (37); Lasith Malinga 2/31 (4 overs)

Mumbai Indians won by 23 runs
Punjab Cricket Association Stadium, Mohali
Umpires: Richard Illingworth (Eng) and Vineet Kulkarni (Ind)
Player of the match: Lendl Simmons (MI)

- Mumbai Indians won the toss and elected to bat.

3 May
20:00 (D/N)
Scorecard

(H) Rajasthan Royals; 189/2 (20 overs)	v	Delhi Daredevils; 175/7 (20 overs)
Ajinkya Rahane 91* (54); Angelo Mathews 1/27 (4 overs)		JP Duminy 56 (39); James Faulkner 2/22 (4 overs)

Rajasthan Royals won by 14 runs
Brabourne Stadium, Mumbai
Umpires: Kumar Dharmasena (SL) and Chris Gaffaney (NZ)
Player of the match: Ajinkya Rahane (RR)

- Delhi Daredevils won the toss and elected to field.
- This was the 500th match of IPL.
- Gurinder Sandhu made his IPL debut.

4 May
16:00 (D/N)
Scorecard

(H) Chennai Super Kings; 148/9 (20 overs)	v	Royal Challengers Bangalore; 124 (19.4 overs)
Suresh Raina 52 (46); Mitchell Starc 3/24 (4 overs)		Virat Kohli 48 (44); Ashish Nehra 3/19 (4 overs)

Chennai Super Kings won by 24 runs
M A Chidambaram Stadium, Chennai
Umpires: Chettithody Shamshuddin (Ind) and Krishnaraj Srinath (Ind)
Player of the match: Suresh Raina (CSK)

- Chennai Super Kings won the toss and elected to bat.

4 May
20:00 (D/N)
Scorecard

(H) Kolkata Knight Riders; 167/7 (20 overs)	v	Sunrisers Hyderabad; 132/9 (20 overs)
Manish Pandey 33 (26); Karn Sharma 2/29 (4 overs)		Moises Henriques 41 (33); Brad Hogg 2/17 (4 overs)

Kolkata Knight Riders won by 35 runs
Eden Gardens, Kolkata
Umpires: Anil Chaudhary (Ind) and Marais Erasmus (SA)
Player of the match: Umesh Yadav (KKR)

- Sunrisers Hyderabad won the toss and elected to field.

5 May
20:00 (D/N)
Scorecard

Delhi Daredevils; 152/6 (20 overs)	v	Mumbai Indians (H); 153/5 (19.3 overs)
Yuvraj Singh 57 (44); Harbhajan Singh 2/11 (4 overs)		Ambati Rayudu 49* (40); Nathan Coulter-Nile 2/30 (4 overs)

Mumbai Indians won by 5 wickets
Wankhede Stadium, Mumbai
Umpires: Kumar Dharmasena (SL) and Chris Gaffaney (NZ)
Player of the match: Harbhajan Singh (MI)

- Delhi Daredevils won the toss and elected to bat.

6 May
20:00 (D/N)
Scorecard

(H) Royal Challengers Bangalore; 226/3 (20 overs)	v	Kings XI Punjab; 88 (13.4 overs)
Chris Gayle 117 (57); Sandeep Sharma 2/41 (4 overs)		Axar Patel 40* (21); Mitchell Starc 4/15 (4 overs)

Royal Challengers Bangalore won by 138 runs
M. Chinnaswamy Stadium, Bangalore
Umpires: Richard Illingworth (Eng) and Vineet Kulkarni (Ind)
Player of the match: Chris Gayle (RCB)

- Kings XI Punjab won the toss and elected to field.

7 May
16:00 (D/N)
Scorecard

Sunrisers Hyderabad; 201/4 (20 overs)	v	Rajasthan Royals (H); 194/7 (20 overs)
Eoin Morgan 63 (28); Shane Watson 2/36 (3 overs)		Steven Smith 68 (40); Bhuvneshwar Kumar 3/44 (4 overs)

Sunrisers Hyderabad won by 7 runs
Brabourne Stadium, Mumbai
Umpires: Johanes Cloete (SA) and Chettithody Shamshuddin (Ind)
Player of the match: Eoin Morgan (SRH)

- Rajasthan Royals won the toss and elected to field.

7 May
20:00 (D/N)
Scorecard

(H) Kolkata Knight Riders; 171/7 (20 overs)	v	Delhi Daredevils; 158/6 (20 overs)
Yusuf Pathan 42 (24); Imran Tahir 2/46 (4 overs)		Shreyas Iyer 40 (35); Piyush Chawla 4/32 (4 overs)

Kolkata Knight Riders won by 13 runs
Eden Gardens, Kolkata
Umpires: Anil Chaudhary (Ind) and Marais Erasmus (SA)
Player of the match: Piyush Chawla (KKR)

- Kolkata Knight Riders won the toss and elected to bat.

8 May
20:00 (D/N)
Scorecard

(H) Chennai Super Kings; 158/5 (20 overs)	v	Mumbai Indians; 159/4 (19.2 overs)
Mahendra Singh Dhoni 39 (32); Jagadeesha Suchith 1/21 (4 overs)		Parthiv Patel 45 (32); Ravichandran Ashwin 2/17 (4 overs)

Mumbai Indians won by 6 wickets
M A Chidambaram Stadium, Chennai
Umpires: Chris Gaffaney (NZ) and CK Nandan (Ind)
Player of the match: Hardik Pandya (MI)

- Chennai Super Kings won the toss and elected to bat.
- Kings XI Punjab were eliminated as a result of this match.

9 May
16:00 (D/N)
Scorecard

Kings XI Punjab; 183/5 (20 overs)	v	Kolkata Knight Riders (H); 184/9 (19.5 overs)
Glenn Maxwell 43 (22); Sunil Narine 4/19 (4 overs)		Andre Russell 51 (21); Gurkeerat Singh 2/17 (3 overs)

Kolkata Knight Riders won by 1 wicket
Eden Gardens, Kolkata
Umpires: Anil Chaudhary (Ind) and Kumar Dharmasena (SL)
Player of the match: Andre Russell (KKR)

- Kings Xi Punjab won the toss and elected to bat.

9 May
20:00 (D/N)
Scorecard

Sunrisers Hyderabad; 163/4 (20 overs)	v	Delhi Daredevils (H); 157/4 (20 overs)
Moises Henriques 74* (46); Nathan Coulter-Nile 2/25 (4 overs)		Kedar Jadhav 63 (34); Karn Sharma 2/12 (3 overs)

Sunrisers Hyderabad won by 6 runs
Chhattisgarh International Cricket Stadium, Raipur
Umpires: Vineet Kulkarni (Ind) and S Ravi (Ind)
Player of the match: Moises Henriques (SRH)

- Sunrisers Hyderabad won the toss and elected to bat.
- Jayant Yadav made his IPL debut.
- Delhi Daredevils were eliminated as a result of this match.

10 May
16:00 (D/N)
Scorecard

Royal Challengers Bangalore; 235/1 (20 overs)	v	Mumbai Indians (H); 196/7 (20 overs)
AB de Villiers 133* (59); Lasith Malinga 1/27 (4 overs)		Lendl Simmons 68* (53); Harshal Patel 2/36 (4 overs)

Royal Challengers Bangalore won by 39 runs
Wankhede Stadium, Mumbai
Umpires: Johanes Cloete (SA) and Chettithody Shamshuddin (Ind)
Player of the match: AB de Villiers (RCB)

- Royal Challengers Bangalore won the toss and elected to bat.
- Virat Kohli and AB de Villiers's 215 run partnership was the highest for any wicket in T20 cricket.

10 May
20:00 (D/N)
Scorecard

(H) Chennai Super Kings; 157/5 (20 overs)	v	Rajasthan Royals; 145/9 (20 overs)
Brendon McCullum 81 (61); Chris Morris 3/19 (4 overs)		Shane Watson 28 (30); Ravindra Jadeja 4/11 (4 overs)

Chennai Super Kings won by 12 runs
M A Chidambaram Stadium, Chennai
Umpires: Marais Erasmus (SA)and CK Nandan (Ind)
Player of the match: Ravindra Jadeja (CSK)

- Chennai Super Kings won the toss and elected to bat.

11 May
20:00 (D/N)
Scorecard

(H) Sunrisers Hyderabad; 185/5 (20 overs)	v	Kings XI Punjab; 180/7 (20 overs)
David Warner 81 (52); Beuran Hendricks 2/40 (4 overs)		David Miller 89* (44); Moises Henriques 3/16 (4 overs)

Sunrisers Hyderabad won 5 runs
Rajiv Gandhi International Cricket Stadium, Hyderabad
Umpires: Anil Chaudhary (Ind) and Kumar Dharmasena (SL)
Player of the match: David Warner (SRH)

- Sunrisers Hyderabad won the toss and elected to bat.

12 May
20:00 (D/N)
Scorecard

Chennai Super Kings; 119/6 (20 overs)	v	Delhi Daredevils (H); 120/4 (16.4 overs)
Faf du Plessis 29 (23); Zaheer Khan 2/9 (4 overs)		Shreyas Iyer 70* (49); Ishwar Pandey 2/27 (4 overs)

Delhi Daredevils won by 6 wickets
Chhattisgarh International Cricket Stadium, Raipur
Umpires: Richard Illingworth (Eng) and Vineet Kulkarni (Ind)
Player of the match: Zaheer Khan (DD)

- Chennai Super Kings won the toss and elected to bat.

13 May
20:00 (D/N)
Scorecard

(H) Kings XI Punjab; 106/6 (10 overs)	v	Royal Challengers Bangalore; 84/6 (10 overs)
Wriddhiman Saha 31 (12); Harshal Patel 2/12 (2 overs)		Mandeep Singh 20 (14); Axar Patel 2/11 (2 overs)

Kings XI Punjab won by 22 runs
Punjab Cricket Association Stadium, Mohali
Umpires: Johanes Cloete (SA) and Chettithody Shamshuddin (Ind)
Player of the match: Axar Patel (KXIP)

- Royal Challengers Bangalore won the toss and elected to field.
- Match reduced to 10 overs per side due to rain.
- Chennai Super Kings qualified for the playoffs as a result of this match.

14 May
20:00 (D/N)
Scorecard

(H) Mumbai Indians; 171/4 (20 overs)	v	Kolkata Knight Riders; 166/7 (20 overs)
Hardik Pandya 61* (31); Shakib Al Hasan 2/22 (4 overs)		Yusuf Pathan 52 (37); Kieron Pollard 1/6 (1 over)

Mumbai Indians won by 5 runs
Wankhede Stadium, Mumbai
Umpires: Richard Illingworth (Eng) and Vineet Kulkarni (Ind)
Player of the match: Hardik Pandya (MI)

- Kolkata Knight Riders won the toss and elected to field.

15 May
20:00 (D/N)
Scorecard

(H) Sunrisers Hyderabad; 135/3 (11 overs)	v	Royal Challengers Bangalore; 83/4 (5.5 overs)
Moises Henriques 57 (22); David Wiese 2/20 (2 overs)		Virat Kohli 44* (19); Moises Henriques 2/3 (1 over)

Royal Challengers Bangalore won by 6 wickets (D/L method)
Rajiv Gandhi International Cricket Stadium, Hyderabad
Umpires: Anil Chaudhary (Ind) and Kumar Dharmasena (SL)
Player of the match: Virat Kohli (RCB)

- Sunrisers Hyderabad won the toss and elected to bat.
- Match reduced to 11 overs per side due to rain.
- Due to rain, Bangalore's target was adjusted to 81 runs from 6 overs via Duckworth-Lewis method.

16 May
16:00 (D/N)
Scorecard

(H) Kings XI Punjab; 130/7 (20 overs)	v	Chennai Super Kings; 134/3 (16.5 overs)
Axar Patel 32 (29); Pawan Negi 2/25 (4 overs)		Faf du Plessis 55 (41); Sandeep Sharma 1/9 (2 overs)

Chennai Super Kings won by 7 wickets
Punjab Cricket Association Stadium, Mohali
Umpires: CK Nandan (Ind) and Chettithody Shamshuddin (Ind)
Player of the match: Pawan Negi (CSK)

- Kings XI Punjab won the toss and elected to bat.
- Chennai Super Kings advanced to Qualifier 1 as a result of this match.

16 May
20:00 (D/N)
Scorecard

(H) Rajasthan Royals; 199/6 (20 overs)	v	Kolkata Knight Riders; 190/9 (20 overs)
Shane Watson 104* (59); Andre Russell 3/32 (4 overs)		Yusuf Pathan 44 (35); Chris Morris 4/23 (4 overs)

Rajasthan Royals won by 9 runs
Brabourne Stadium, Mumbai
Umpires: Rajesh Deshpande (Ind) and Richard Illingworth (Eng)
Player of the match: Shane Watson (RR)

- Rajasthan Royals won the toss and elected to bat.
- Barinder Sran made his IPL debut.
- The 13 wides bowled by Rajasthan is record in a single innings in the IPL

17 May
16:00 (D/N)
Scorecard

Delhi Daredevils; 187/5 (20 overs)	v	Royal Challengers Bangalore (H); 2/0 (1.1 overs)
Quinton de Kock 69 (39); Harshal Patel 2/30 (4 overs)		Virat Kohli 1* (2)

No result
M Chinnaswamy Stadium, Bangalore
Umpires: Kumar Dharmasena (SL) and Krishnamachari Srinivasan (Ind)

- Royal Challengers Bangalore won the toss and elected to field.
- Match abandoned after 1.1 overs of Bangalore innings due to rain.
- Royal Challengers Bangalore and Rajasthan Royals qualified for the playoffs as a result of this match.

17 May
20:00 (D/N)
Scorecard

(H) Sunrisers Hyderabad; 113 (20 overs)	v	Mumbai Indians; 114/1 (13.5 overs)
Lokesh Rahul 25 (24); Mitchell McClenaghan 3/16 (4 overs)		Parthiv Patel 51* (37); Karn Sharma 1/38 (2.5 overs)

Mumbai Indians won by 9 wickets
Rajiv Gandhi International Cricket Stadium, Hyderabad
Umpires: Chris Gaffaney (NZ) and Krishnaraj Srinath (Ind)
Player of the match: Mitchell McClenaghan (MI)

- Sunrisers Hyderabad won the toss and elected to bat.
- Mumbai Indians qualified for the playoffs and advanced to Qualifier 1, and Kolkata Knight Riders and Sunrisers Hyderabad were eliminated as a result of this match.

== Playoff stage ==
Semifinals
19 May — Wankhede Stadium, Mumbai
1	Chennai Super Kings	162 (19 ov)
2	Mumbai Indians	187/6 (20 ov)
20 May — MCA Stadium, Pune
3	Royal Challengers Bangalore	180/4 (20 ov)
4	Rajasthan Royals	109 (19 ov)

Preliminary final
22 May — JSCA International Cricket Stadium, Ranchi
1	Chennai Super Kings	140/7 (19.5 ov)
3	Royal Challengers Bangalore	139/8 (20 ov)

Final
24 May — Eden Gardens, Kolkata
2	Mumbai Indians	202/5 (20 ov)
1	Chennai Super Kings	161/8 (20 ov)

=== Preliminary ===
Qualifier 1

19 May
20:00 (D/N)
Scorecard

Mumbai Indians; 187/6 (20 overs)	v	Chennai Super Kings; 162 (19 overs)
Lendl Simmons 65 (51); Dwayne Bravo 3/40 (4 overs)		Faf du Plessis 45 (34); Lasith Malinga 3/23 (4 overs)

Mumbai Indians won by 25 runs
Wankhede Stadium, Mumbai
Umpires: Kumar Dharmasena (SL) and Richard Illingworth (Eng)
Player of the match: Kieron Pollard (MI)

- Mumbai Indians won the toss and elected to bat.

Eliminator

20 May
20:00 (D/N)
Scorecard

Royal Challengers Bangalore; 180/4 (20 overs)	v	Rajasthan Royals; 109 (20 overs)
AB de Villiers 66 (38); Dhawal Kulkarni 2/28 (4 overs)		Ajinkya Rahane 42 (39); Harshal Patel 2/15 (3 overs)

Royal Challengers Bangalore won by 71 runs
MCA Stadium, Pune
Umpires: Anil Chaudhary (Ind) and Chettithody Shamshuddin (Ind)
Player of the match: AB de Villiers (RCB)

- Royal Challengers Bangalore won the toss and elected to bat.

Qualifier 2

22 May
20:00 (D/N)
Scorecard

Royal Challengers Bangalore; 139/8 (20 overs)	v	Chennai Super Kings; 140/7 (19.5 overs)
Chris Gayle 41 (43); Ashish Nehra 3/28 (4 overs)		Michael Hussey 56 (46); Yuzvendra Chahal 2/28 (4 overs)

Chennai Super Kings won by 3 wickets
JSCA International Cricket Stadium, Ranchi
Umpires: Anil Chaudhary (Ind) and Chris Gaffaney (NZ)
Player of the match: Ashish Nehra (CSK)

- Chennai Super Kings won the toss and elected to field.

=== Final ===
24 May
20:00 (D/N)
Scorecard

Mumbai Indians; 202/5 (20 overs)	v	Chennai Super Kings; 161/8 (20 overs)
Lendl Simmons 68 (45); Dwayne Bravo 2/36 (4 overs)		Dwayne Smith 57 (48 ) Mitchell McClenaghan 3/25 (4 overs)

Mumbai Indians won by 41 runs
Eden Gardens, Kolkata
Umpires: Kumar Dharmasena (SL) and Richard Illingworth (Eng)
Player of the match: Rohit Sharma (MI)

- Chennai Super Kings won the toss and elected to field.

== Statistics ==
=== Most runs ===
Player	Team	Mat	Inns	Runs	HS
David Warner	Sunrisers Hyderabad	14	14	562	91
Lendl Simmons	Mumbai Indians	13	13	540	71
Ajinkya Rahane	Rajasthan Royals	14	13	540	91*
AB de Villiers	Royal Challengers Bangalore	16	14	513	133*
Virat Kohli	Royal Challengers Bangalore	16	16	505	82*

- The player with the most runs at the end of the tournament received the Orange Cap.

=== Most wickets ===
Player	Team	Mat	Inns	Wkts	BBI
Dwayne Bravo	Chennai Super Kings	17	16	26	3/22
Lasith Malinga	Mumbai Indians	15	15	24	4/23
Yuzvendra Chahal	Royal Challengers Bangalore	15	14	23	3/40
Ashish Nehra	Chennai Super Kings	16	16	22	4/10
Mitchell Starc	Royal Challengers Bangalore	13	12	20	4/15

- The player with the most wickets at the end of the tournament received the Purple Cap.

=== Most catches ===
Player	Team	Mat	Ctch
Dwayne Bravo	Chennai Super Kings	17	13
Ravindra Jadeja	Chennai Super Kings	17	13
Suresh Raina	Chennai Super Kings	17	11
Ambati Rayudu	Mumbai Indians	15	9
Kieron Pollard	Mumbai Indians	16	9

- Source: ESPNcricinfo
