= Lendl Simmons =

West Indian cricketer (born 1985)

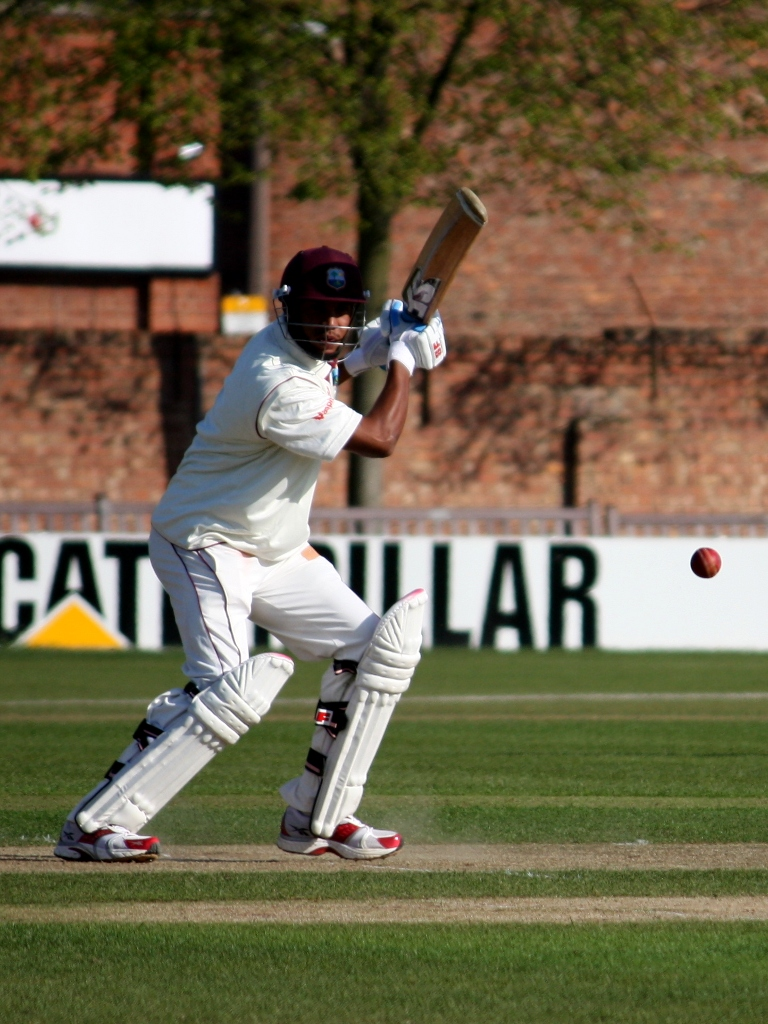

Personal information
- Full name: Lendl Mark Platter Simmons
- Born: 25 January 1985 (age 41); Port of Spain, Trinidad and Tobago
- Batting: Right-handed
- Bowling: Right-arm fast-medium
- Role: Top-order batsman
- Relatives: Phil Simmons (uncle)

International information
- National side: West Indies (2006–2021)
- Test debut (cap 273): 6 March 2009 v England
- Last Test: 21 October 2011 v Bangladesh
- ODI debut (cap 132): 7 December 2006 v Pakistan
- Last ODI: 21 March 2015 v New Zealand
- ODI shirt no.: 54
- T20I debut (cap 18): 29 June 2007 v England
- Last T20I: 26 October 2021 v South Africa
- T20I shirt no.: 54

Domestic team information
- Years: Team
- 2001/02–2020/21: Trinidad and Tobago
- 2012–2013: Chittagong Kings
- 2013–2015: Guyana Amazon Warriors
- 2014–2017: Mumbai Indians
- 2015/16: Rangpur Riders
- 2015/16: Brisbane Heat
- 2015/16–2017/18: Karachi Kings
- 2016: Saint Kitts and Nevis
- 2017: Jamaica Tallawahs
- 2017/18: Rajshahi Kings
- 2018: St Lucia Zouks
- 2019–2021: Trinbago Knight Riders
- 2019/20: Chattogram Challengers
- 2021/22: Sylhet Sunrisers

Career statistics
Competition	Test	ODI	T20I	FC
Matches	8	68	68	97
Runs scored	278	1,958	1,527	5,436
Batting average	17.37	31.58	26.79	33.34
100s/50s	0/0	2/16	0/9	11/25
Top score	49	122	91*	282
Balls bowled	192	156	43	1,092
Wickets	1	1	6	17
Bowling average	147.00	172.00	12.00	34.41
5 wickets in innings	0	0	0	0
10 wickets in match	0	0	0	0
Best bowling	1/60	1/3	4/19	3/6
Catches/stumpings	5/–	28/–	35/–	99/4
Medal record
Men's Cricket
Representing West Indies
ICC Men's T20 World Cup
Winner	2012 Sri Lanka
Winner	2016 India
- Source: ESPNcricinfo, 2019 October 2022

Lendl Mark Platter Simmons (born 25 January 1985) is a Trinidadian cricketer who played internationally for the West Indies. He is a right-handed batsman, an occasional right-arm medium pace bowler, and a part-time wicket-keeper. His uncle is former West Indian Test cricketer Phil Simmons.

Simmons was a member of the West Indies team that won both the 2012 T20 World Cup and the 2016 T20 World Cup. In July 2022, he announced his retirement from international cricket.

Simmons is named after tennis icon Ivan Lendl.

== Early career ==
A prominent junior cricketer, he played in both the 2002 Under-19 World Cup in New Zealand and the 2004 Under-19 Cricket World Cup in Bangladesh for the West Indies U-19s. Two years later he made his ODI debut against Pakistan at Faisalabad on 7 December 2006.

Simmons is capable of large scores; with three first class double-centuries to his name, but at the same time he has been prone to inconsistency. His career best of 282, in a first-class match for West Indies A against a touring England XI in January 2009, heralded his Test debut in the final Test of that tour. Simmons scored 24 and 8 as the West Indies secured a series-clinching draw at the Queen's Park Oval, Trinidad. Simmons was retained for the following West Indian tour of England, but has played no further Tests.

== T20 franchise career ==
=== Indian Premier League ===
In April 2014 it was announced that Simmons had been signed by Indian Premier League side Mumbai Indians, replacing Jalaj Saxena. This had the aim of improving the team's fortunes, after they had gone without a win in any of their 4 matches prior to his signing. On 22 May 2014, Simmons scored his maiden IPL century helping his team post a 7 wickets win over Kings XI Punjab.

In August 2014, Simmons was travelling in the USA between games for Guyana Amazon Warriors in the Caribbean Premier League when his bat attracted the attention of US customs officials, who apparently believed that it was being used to smuggle illegal drugs. As a consequence, they drilled several holes into the bat.

Simmons was selected for Mumbai Indians for play 2014 IPL and 2015 IPL seasons. He opened the batting with Indian Parthiv Patel during the 2015 season due to injury of Aaron Finch, where they became the most dangerous opening pair of the IPL 8 with an average over 50. Simmons played a major role in the team guided to the IPL 8 win by Mumbai Indians. It was their second title in IPL. Simmons was benched for more than half of the 2017 season but later got the opportunity to open after the departure of Jos Buttler for international duty. Mumbai went on to win the 2017 season as well marking their 3rd win.

He however has remained unsold in the IPL auctions since 2018.

=== Pakistan Super League ===
In late 2015 at the 2016 PSL Draft Lendl Simmons was bought and played in the first edition of the tournament for the Karachi Kings. Second & Third picked by Karachi Kings and fourth edition picked by Peshawar Zalmi In 2019 at the 2020 PSL Draft picked by Lahore Qalanders.

=== Other leagues ===
On 3 June 2018, he was picked to play for the Winnipeg Hawks in the players' draft for the inaugural edition of the Global T20 Canada tournament. He was the leading run-scorer in the tournament, with 321 runs in eight matches. In June 2019, he was selected to play for the Brampton Wolves franchise team in the 2019 Global T20 Canada tournament. In July 2020, he was named in the Trinbago Knight Riders squad for the 2020 Caribbean Premier League.

In 2023 he was plays for Bhilwara Kings in Legends League cricket. Before this he had also played for Gujarat Giants.

== International career ==
Simmons made his Test debut against England on 6 March 2009 and ODI debut against Pakistan on 7 December 2006. He has scored two ODI centuries. Though he is very good at ODI and T20I, Simmons has failed in Test cricket, where his highest score is 49 runs against Pakistan. He scored his maiden century in ODIs by scoring 122 against Bangladesh at Shere Bangla National Stadium, Dhaka. His second century came in 2015 Cricket World Cup against Ireland in Nelson, New Zealand. In fact, Ireland upset the West Indies by winning that match by 4 wickets.

In March 2017, he was named in the West Indies squad for the Twenty20 International (T20I) series against Pakistan. In September 2021, Simmons was named in the West Indies' squad for the 2021 ICC Men's T20 World Cup.
