= Ashish Nehra =

Indian cricketer (born 1979)

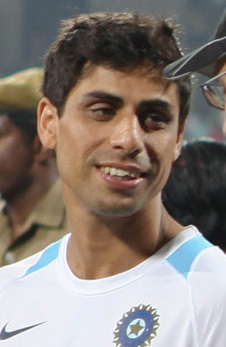
- Nehra in 2010

Personal information
- Born: 29 April 1979 (age 47); Delhi, India
- Nickname: Nehra ji, Ashu
- Height: 6 ft (183 cm)
- Batting: Right-handed
- Bowling: Left arm fast
- Role: Bowler

International information
- National side: India (1999–2017)
- Test debut (cap 220): 24 February 1999 v Sri Lanka
- Last Test: 13 April 2004 v Pakistan
- ODI debut (cap 137): 21 June 2001 v Zimbabwe
- Last ODI: 30 March 2011 v Pakistan
- ODI shirt no.: 64
- T20I debut (cap 25): 9 December 2009 v Sri Lanka
- Last T20I: 1 November 2017 v New Zealand

Domestic team information
- Years: Team
- 1997–2017: Delhi
- 2008: Mumbai Indians
- 2009–2010: Delhi Daredevils
- 2011–2012: Pune Warriors India
- 2013: Delhi Daredevils
- 2014–2015: Chennai Super Kings
- 2016–2017: Sunrisers Hyderabad

Career statistics
Competition	Test	ODI	T20I	FC
Matches	17	120	27	90
Runs scored	77	157	34	756
Batting average	5.50	5.64	5.60	9.69
100s/50s	0/0	0/0	0/0	0/1
Top score	19	24	22	57
Balls bowled	3,447	5,751	588	16,996
Wickets	44	157	34	303
Bowling average	42.40	31.72	22.29	29.14
5 wickets in innings	0	2	0	14
10 wickets in match	0	0	0	4
Best bowling	4/72	6/23	3/19	7/14
Catches/stumpings	5/–	18/–	4/–	25/–
Medal record
Men's Cricket
Representing India
ICC Cricket World Cup
Winner	2011 India-Bangladesh-Sri Lanka
Runner-up	2003 South Africa-Zimbabwe-Kenya
ICC Champions Trophy
Winner	2002 Sri Lanka
ACC Asia Cup
Winner	2010 Sri Lanka
Winner	2016 Bangladesh
Runner-up	2004 Sri Lanka
- Source: ESPNcricinfo, 04 September 2022

Ashish Nehra (Born 29 April 1979) is an Indian cricket coach and former cricketer who played in all formats of the game. Nehra announced his retirement from all forms of cricket in late 2017, with the Twenty20 International match against New Zealand on 1 November 2017 at Feroz Shah Kotla Ground his last appearance. With India, Nehra was a member of the Indian team that was one of the joint-winners of the 2002 ICC Champions Trophy, which the title was also shared with Sri Lanka, and was a member of the team that won the 2011 Cricket World Cup although he did not play in the final.

== Early and personal life ==
Nehra was born in Delhi to Diwan Singh Nehra and Sumitra Nehra. Nehra was very passionate about cricket from an early age. Nehra would ride scooters with Virender Sehwag to the Feroz Shah Kotla stadium in Delhi to be able to play cricket. This allowed him to grow success and eventually rise through the ranks. He eventually joined the Delhi team to participate in the Ranji Trophy.

== International career ==
He made his debut against Sri Lanka national cricket team. On 26 February 2003, during the 2003 ICC Cricket World Cup, Nehra took 6 for 23 against England, which was the best bowling figures by an Indian bowler in Cricket World Cup history until Mohammad Shami surpassed it against New Zealand on 15 November 2023 during the semi-final of the 2023 ICC Cricket World Cup.

Nehra was named in the 'Team of the Tournament' for the 2016 T20 World Cup by the ICC and ESPNcricinfo.

In the 2013–14 Ranji Trophy, he took 6/16 from 10 overs to bowl out Vidarbha for a meagre 88 in the first innings at the Roshanara Club Ground at Delhi.

After recovering from the ankle injury that prevented him from playing for the Delhi Ranji Team in the 2007–08 season, Nehra joined the Indian Premier League and signed up for the Mumbai Indians franchise. For his performances in 2014 and 2015 for Chennai Super Kings, he was named in the ESPNcricinfo CLT20 XI.

== Coaching career ==
In January 2018, Royal Challengers Bangalore appointed Nehra as their bowling coach. He retained his position for the 2019 IPL.

In January 2022, he was appointed the head coach of newly formed Indian Premier League franchise Gujarat Titans. In the 2022 IPL season, Gujarat Titans finished top of the table and went on to win the trophy in the final against Rajasthan Royals. Nehra also became the first Indian head coach to win the Indian Premier League.
