= Parthiv Patel =

Indian cricketer (born 1985)

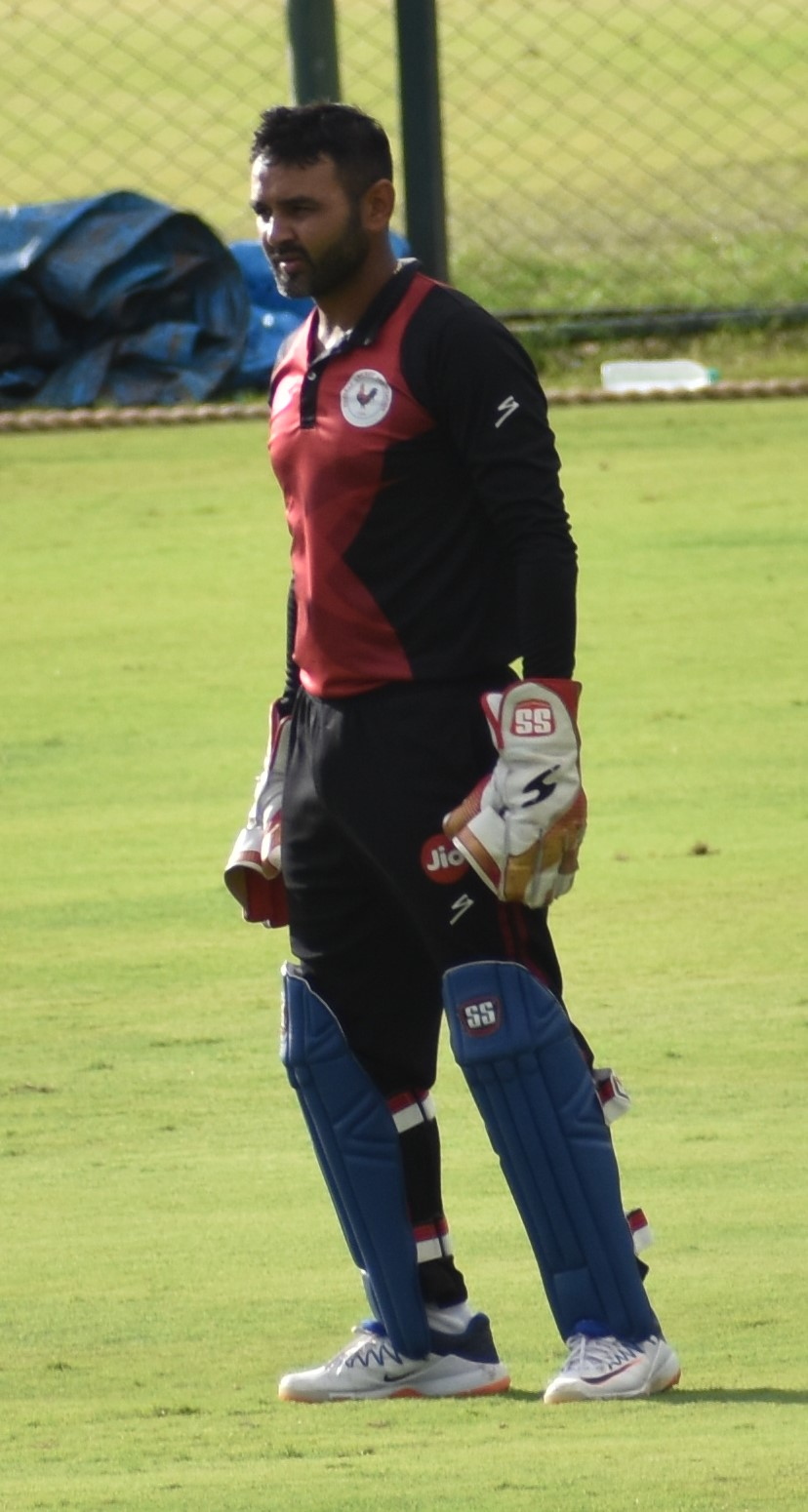
- Patel during the 2019–20 Vijay Hazare Trophy

Personal information
- Full name: Parthiv Ajay Patel
- Born: 9 March 1985 (age 41); Ahmedabad, Gujarat, India
- Height: 5 ft 2 in (157 cm)
- Batting: Left-handed
- Role: Wicket-keeper batsman

International information
- National side: India (2002–2018)
- Test debut (cap 244): 8 August 2002 v England
- Last Test: 25 January 2018 v South Africa
- ODI debut (cap 148): 4 January 2003 v New Zealand
- Last ODI: 21 February 2012 v Sri Lanka
- ODI shirt no.: 9
- T20I debut (cap 37): 4 June 2011 v West Indies
- Last T20I: 31 August 2011 v England
- T20I shirt no.: 42

Domestic team information
- Years: Team
- 2004/05–2020: Gujarat
- 2008–2010: Chennai Super Kings (squad no. 9)
- 2011: Kochi Tuskers Kerala (squad no. 42)
- 2012: Deccan Chargers (squad no. 42)
- 2013: Sunrisers Hyderabad (squad no. 42)
- 2014, 2018–2020: Royal Challengers Bangalore (squad no. 42, 13)
- 2015–2017: Mumbai Indians (squad no. 72)

Career statistics
Competition	Test	ODI	T20I	FC
Matches	25	38	2	194
Runs scored	934	736	36	11,240
Batting average	31.13	23.74	18.00	43.39
100s/50s	0/6	0/4	0/0	27/62
Top score	71	95	26	206
Catches/stumpings	62/10	30/9	1/–	486/77
Medal record
Men's Cricket
Representing India
ICC Cricket World Cup
Runner-up	2003 South Africa-Zimbabwe-Kenya
ACC Asia Cup
Winner	2016 Bangladesh
Runner-up	2004 Sri Lanka
- Source: ESPNcricinfo, 9 December 2020

Parthiv Ajay Patel (born 9 March 1985) is a former Indian professional cricketer, wicketkeeper-batsman, who played for the Indian national cricket team. He is a left-handed batsman and played for Gujarat in domestic cricket. Having lost a finger at the age of 6, he initially found it hard to keep wickets, but after enough practice, he got used to it. When Patel played for the Indian team in 2002, he became the youngest wicket-keeper to represent a country in Tests. He was a part of the Indian squad which won the 2016 Asia Cup.

In December 2020, Patel announced his retirement from all forms of cricket. After his retirement, Patel joined Mumbai Indians as a Talent Scout. He is also now seen as a commentator in the Indian Premier League and International Matches too.

In November 2024, Patel was appointed as the assistant and batting coach of Gujarat Titans for the upcoming season of the Indian Premier League.

== Domestic career ==
Patel led the Gujarat team in the 2016–17 Ranji Trophy. Beating Odisha and Jharkhand in the quarterfinal and semifinal, the team reached the final for only the second time. In the final in January, they met defending champions Mumbai in Indore. Patel scored 90 in the first inning and 143 in the second and helped beat Mumbai to win its first Trophy. Patel's 143 was the highest in a successful chase in a Ranji Trophy final. The win also made Gujarat the first team and Patel the first captain to have won all three major titles in domestic cricket in India.

In July 2018, he was named as the captain for India Green for the 2018–19 Duleep Trophy. In October 2019, he was named as the captain of India B for the 2019–20 Deodhar Trophy.

=== Indian Premier League ===
Patel was auctioned in the inaugural Indian Premier League (IPL) to Chennai Super Kings. He used to be a regular in the team and opened with the former Australian opener Matthew Hayden. He did not keep wicket as the Indian wicketkeeper and captain, MS Dhoni, was in the team. For the fourth season, he was signed by Kochi Tuskers Kerala. On 16 May, it was announced that Parthiv will be leading the Kochi Tuskers Kerala for the rest of the 2011 Indian Premier League. As a result of the termination of Kochi Tuskers franchise, Parthiv, along with the other players from the franchise, was once again auctioned for the 2012 Indian Premier League season. He was picked by Deccan Chargers for $1m During the 2012 IPL Trading Window. Parthiv was picked up by Sunrisers Hyderabad in 2013 and by Royal Challenger Bangalore in 2014. Patel was signed by Mumbai Indians for the 2015 IPL as an opening batsmen.

In January 2018, he was bought by the Royal Challengers Bangalore in the 2018 IPL auction.

=== Other franchise cricket ===
In 2022, Gujarat Giants selected him in the Legends League Cricket and gave him the captaincy in the 2023 Legends League Cricket season.

== International career ==
Parthiv debuted in the year 2002 against England at Trent Bridge at 17 years and 153 days to become Test Cricket's youngest wicketkeeper. He had replaced the injured Ajay Ratra and eclipsed the record previously held by Pakistan's Hanif Mohammed (17 years and 300 days). In the second innings, Patel resisted for 82 minutes and remained unbeaten on 19. Alongside Zaheer Khan, who was also unbeaten on 14, he helped India reach 424 for eight declared. With 10 overs remaining in the day, the teams agreed to a draw. However, with the emergence of Dhoni and poor wicketkeeping, he was sidelined for a few matches in 2004.

On 23 November 2016, Parthiv Patel was called up as a replacement for the regular wicket-keeper Wriddhiman Saha who had a thigh strain, for the third Test (at Mohali) of the India-England home series. He played his first Test in eight years, having missed 83 Test matches between appearances.

Patel made his ODI debut against New Zealand in January 2003. He was selected in the Indian squad for the 2003 Cricket World Cup but did not play any games, with Rahul Dravid being used as a makeshift wicket-keeper to allow the use of an extra batsman or bowler. With this policy in place, Patel only made intermittent appearances in ODIs, usually when Dravid was injured or being rested (in full or from wicket-keeping duties). He played 13 ODIs in a two-year span, and during an interrupted career managed only an average of 14.66 and a top-score of 28 and was dropped thereafter. Parthiv returned to the Indian team in 2010 in the 4th and 5th Odi vs New Zealand. He celebrated this moment by hitting two back to back half centuries. Later on he was called up for replacing injured Sachin Tendulkar in India tour South Africa .

=== Tour of West Indies 2011 ===
With wicket-keeper captain MS Dhoni rested for the tour along with several seniors such as Sachin Tendulkar, Zaheer Khan, he was entrusted with the job of wicket-keeping in the tour along with Wriddhiman Saha. In the lone T20I match played in the tour, he made his T20I debut at the Queen's Park Oval at Port-of-Spain. He opened the batting along with another left-handed debutante Shikhar Dhawan and made a 26 from 20 balls. In the second ODI against West Indies he scored 56 not out.

=== England tour of India 2016 ===
With wicket-keeper Wriddhiman Saha injured, Parthiv was recalled to test team duty for the third test in Mohali. He proved the selectors' decision right with two good innings including an unbeaten 67 runs from 54 balls in the second innings which led India to victory, marking an unlikely comeback to international cricket.

=== T20 match in 2005 ===
Parthiv Patel, along with Robin Singh and Rohan Gavaskar played their first T20 match in 2005. This was the early phase of t20 format. But the first Indian cricketer to play a t20 match was Dinesh Mongia. He played his debut match in July 2004.

== Personal life ==
Patel married Avni Zaveri in 2008.
