= 2018–19 Ranji Trophy Group B =

Cricket tournament

2018-19 Ranji Trophy Group B
- The Ranji Trophy, awarded to the winners
- Dates: 1 November 2018 – 10 January 2019
- Administrator: BCCI
- Cricket format: First-class cricket
- Tournament format: Round-robin
- Host: India
- Participants: 9
- Matches: 36

The 2018–19 Ranji Trophy was the 85th season of the Ranji Trophy, the first-class cricket tournament that took place in India. It was contested by 37 teams, divided into four groups, with nine teams in Group B. The group stage ran from 1 November 2018 to 10 January 2019. The top five teams across Group A and Group B progressed to the quarter-finals of the competition.

Ahead of Delhi's first match, in round two of the tournament, Gautam Gambhir stepped down as captain of the side. Nitish Rana was appointed as the new captain of the team. In December 2018, Gambhir announced his retirement from all forms of cricket. Gambhir went on to score 112 in his final innings, his 43rd century in first-class cricket.

In round five of the tournament, Ajay Rohera set a new record for the highest score on debut in a first-class match. Batting for Madhya Pradesh against Hyderabad, he scored 267 not out, breaking the record of 260 runs set by Amol Mazumdar in 1994. Naman Ojha became the most successful wicket-keeper in the Ranji Trophy. He broke Vinayak Samant's record of 355 dismissals as a wicket-keeper.

On the final day of the group stage, Kerala qualified from Group B for the quarter-finals.

== Points table ==
Pos	Team	Pld	W	L	D	T	NR	Pts	Quot
4	Kerala	8	4	3	1	0	0	26	1.156
7	Madhya Pradesh	8	3	2	3	0	0	24	1.144
8	Bengal	8	2	1	5	0	0	23	1.076
9	Punjab	8	2	1	5	0	0	23	1.017
10	Himachal Pradesh	8	3	3	2	0	0	22	1.042
12	Andhra	8	1	2	5	0	0	17	0.900
13	Hyderabad	8	1	1	6	0	0	17	0.840
14	Tamil Nadu	8	1	2	5	0	0	15	1.016
16	Delhi	8	1	3	4	0	0	14	0.822

- Top five teams across Groups A and B advanced to the knockout stage.
- Bottom two teams across Groups A and B relegated to the Elite Group C for the next season.

== Fixtures ==
=== Round 1 ===
1–4 November 2018
Scorecard

Punjab	v	Andhra
414 (156.2 overs); Sanvir Singh 110 (195); Bandaru Ayyappa 3/78 (30 overs)		423 (155.5 overs); Ricky Bhui 181 (370); Mayank Markande 5/129 (55 overs)
102/2 (33 overs); Shubman Gill 54* (103); Paidikalva Vijaykumar 1/2 (6 overs)

Match drawn
Dr. Y.S. Rajasekhara Reddy ACA-VDCA Cricket Stadium, Visakhapatnam
Umpires: Mukund Mandale and Sadashiv Iyer
Player of the match: Ricky Bhui (Andhra)

- Andhra won the toss and elected to field.
- Mayank Markande (Andhra), Arpit Pannu and Sanvir Singh (Punjab) all made their first-class debuts.
- Sanvir Singh (Punjab) scored his maiden century in first-class cricket.

1–4 November 2018
Scorecard

Bengal	v	Himachal Pradesh
380 (116.1 overs); Manoj Tiwary 55 (85); Pankaj Jaswal 5/81 (23.1 overs)		324 (115 overs); Ankush Bains 86 (139); Pradipta Pramanik 4/60 (19 overs)
203/3 (67 overs); Abhishek Raman 87 (207); Prashant Chopra 2/53 (15 overs)

Match drawn
Atal Bihari Vajpayee Stadium, Nadaun
Umpires: Ulhas Gandhe and Amit Bansal
Player of the match: Aamir Gani (Bengal)

- Bengal won the toss and elected to bat.
- Ekant Sen (Himachal Pradesh) made his first-class debut.
- Pankaj Jaswal (Himachal Pradesh) took his maiden five-wicket haul in first-class cricket.
- Prashant Chopra (Himachal Pradesh) scored his 3,000th run in first-class cricket.

1–4 November 2018
Scorecard

Kerala	v	Hyderabad
495/6d (164 overs); Sachin Baby 147 (296); Palakodeti Sairam 3/110 (32 overs)		228/5 (112 overs); Bavanaka Sandeep 56* (155); Akshay Chandran 2/44 (20 overs)

Match drawn
St Xavier's College Ground, Thumba
Umpires: Vineet Kulkarni and GS Ananth Ramakrishnan
Player of the match: VA Jagadeesh (Kerala)

- Hyderabad won the toss and elected to field.
- Bavanaka Sandeep (Hyderabad) scored his 3,000th run in first-class cricket.

1–4 November 2018
Scorecard

Madhya Pradesh	v	Tamil Nadu
393 (157.4 overs); Rajat Patidar 196 (406); Ravichandran Ashwin 4/85 (38.4 overs)		236/4 (77.4 overs); Baba Indrajith 103* (184); Avesh Khan 2/49 (13 overs)

Match drawn
NPR College Ground, Dindigul
Umpires: K. N. Ananthapadmanabhan and Nand Kishore
Player of the match: Rajat Patidar (Madhya Pradesh)

- Madhya Pradesh won the toss and elected to bat.
- No play was possible on day 3 due to rain.
- Abhishek Tanwar (Tamil Nadu), Yash Dubey and Kuldeep Sen (Madhya Pradesh) all made their first-class debuts.
- M. Mohammed (Tamil Nadu) took a hat-trick.

=== Round 2 ===
12–15 November 2018
Scorecard

Delhi	v	Himachal Pradesh
317 (92.5 overs); Dhruv Shorey 88 (158); Pankaj Jaswal 3/56 (12.5 overs)		223 (64.3 overs); Rishi Dhawan 64 (114); Varun Sood 4/53 (15 overs)
281/4d (67 overs); Dhruv Shorey 106* (177); Mayank Dagar 3/70 (19 overs)		266/5 (102 overs); Nikhil Gangta 66* (184); Ishant Sharma 2/42 (16 overs)

Match drawn
Feroz Shah Kotla Ground, Delhi
Umpires: Tapan Sharma and Navdeep Singh
Player of the match: Dhruv Shorey (Delhi)

- Delhi won the toss and elected to bat.
- Hiten Dalal (Delhi) made his first-class debut.

12–15 November 2018
Scorecard

Bengal	v	Madhya Pradesh
510/9d (149.3 overs); Manoj Tiwary 201* (279); Shubham Sharma 5/59 (14 overs)		335 (105.5 overs); Naman Ojha 74 (151); Ashok Dinda 4/78 (28 overs)
		240/3 (68.2 overs) (f/o); Aryaman Birla 103* (189); Anustup Majumdar 2/60 (10 overs)

Match drawn
Eden Gardens, Kolkata
Umpires: Amit Bansal and Sadashiv Iyer
Player of the match: Manoj Tiwary (Bengal)

- Madhya Pradesh won the toss and elected to field.
- Manoj Tiwary (Bengal) scored his fifth double-century in first-class cricket.
- Aryaman Birla (Madhya Pradesh) scored his maiden century in first-class cricket.

12–15 November 2018
Scorecard

Andhra	v	Kerala
254 (99.4 overs); Ricky Bhui 109 (205); KC Akshay 4/64 (27 overs)		328 (119.2 overs); Jalaj Saxena 133 (232); Manish Golamaru 3/81 (31 overs)
115 (51.3 overs); Ricky Bhui 32 (58); Jalaj Saxena 8/45 (21.3 overs)		43/1 (13 overs); Jalaj Saxena 19* (38); Manish Golamaru 1/24 (6 overs)

Kerala won by 9 wickets
St Xavier's College Ground, Thumba
Umpires: Krishnaraj Srinath and Rajesh Timaney
Player of the match: Jalaj Saxena (Kerala)

- Andhra won the toss and elected to bat.
- Manish Golamaru and Siva Charan Singh (Andhra) both made their first-class debuts.

12–15 November 2018
Scorecard

Hyderabad	v	Tamil Nadu
565/8d (186 overs); Akshath Reddy 250 (480); M. Mohammed 3/102 (31 overs)		409/4 (154 overs); Abhinav Mukund 178 (398); Chama Milind 2/46 (21 overs)

Match drawn
Indian Cement Company Ground, Tirunelveli
Umpires: Sivasubramaniyan Shankar and Pashchim Pathak
Player of the match: Akshath Reddy (Hyderabad)

- Hyderabad won the toss and elected to bat.
- Varun Chakravarthy (Tamil Nadu) made his first-class debut.
- Akshath Reddy (Hyderabad) scored his maiden double-century in first-class cricket.

=== Round 3 ===
20–23 November 2018
Scorecard

Hyderabad	v	Delhi
460 (170.3 overs); Tanmay Agarwal 120 (272); Gaurav Kumar 3/50 (22.3 overs)		339 (128.1 overs); Hiten Dalal 93 (180); Tanay Thyagarajan 5/77 (28 overs)
156/1 (43 overs); Tanmay Agarwal 82 (111); Nitish Rana 1/29 (9 overs)

Match drawn
Rajiv Gandhi International Cricket Stadium, Hyderabad
Umpires: Krishnaraj Srinath and Puttarangaiah Jayapal
Player of the match: Tanay Thyagarajan (Hyderabad)

- Hyderabad won the toss and elected to bat.
- Tanay Thyagarajan (Hyderabad), Sarthak Ranjan, Gaurav Kumar and Simarjeet Singh (Delhi) all made their first-class debuts.

20–23 November 2018
Scorecard

Bengal	v	Kerala
147 (56.2 overs); Anustup Majumdar 53 (97); Basil Thampi 4/57 (16.2 overs)		291 (83 overs); Jalaj Saxena 143 (190); Ishan Porel 4/69 (18 overs)
184 (56.5 overs); Manoj Tiwary 62 (75); Sandeep Warrier 5/33 (21.5 overs)		44/1 (11 overs); Jalaj Saxena 26 (21); Mukesh Kumar 1/4 (2 overs)

Kerala won by 9 wickets
Eden Gardens, Kolkata
Umpires: Nitin Pandit and Chirra Ravikanthreddy
Player of the match: Jalaj Saxena (Kerala)

- Kerala won the toss and elected to field.

20–23 November 2018
Scorecard

Punjab	v	Madhya Pradesh
293 (84.4 overs); Jiwanjot Singh 124 (216); Kuldeep Sen 5/62 (19.4 overs)		315 (124.4 overs); Rajat Patidar 73 (153); Mayank Markande 4/70 (22.2 overs)
265/9d (68 overs); Abhishek Sharma 78 (61); Ishwar Pandey 4/59 (23 overs)		67/1 (35 overs); Mohnish Mishra 34* (104); Siddarth Kaul 1/12 (8 overs)

Match drawn
Holkar Cricket Stadium, Indore
Umpires: Saiyed Khalid and Steve O'Shaughnessy
Player of the match: Kuldeep Sen (Madhya Pradesh)

- Punjab won the toss and elected to bat.
- Kuldeep Sen (Madhya Pradesh) took his maiden five-wicket haul in first-class cricket.

20–23 November 2018
Scorecard

Andhra	v	Tamil Nadu
216 (89.5 overs); Girinath Reddy 86* (197); M. Mohammed 4/70 (25 overs)		254 (112.4 overs); Baba Aparajith 57 (184); Karthik Raman 1/36 (20 overs)
7/0 (7 overs); Ashwin Hebbar 5* (23)

Match drawn
CSR Sharma College Ground, Ongole
Umpires: Sivasubramaniyan Shankar and Belur Ravi

- Tamil Nadu won the toss and elected to field.
- No play was possible on day 3 due to rain.
- Girinath Reddy (Andhra) made his first-class debut.

=== Round 4 ===
28 November–1 December 2018
Scorecard

Kerala	v	Madhya Pradesh
63 (35 overs); Vishnu Vinod 16 (24); Avesh Khan 4/8 (10 overs)		328 (119.5 overs); Yash Dubey 79 (186); Jalaj Saxena 4/120 (39.5 overs)
455 (121.1 overs); Vishnu Vinod 193* (282); Kuldeep Sen 3/69 (23 overs)		194/5 (62 overs); Rajat Patidar 77 (92); Akshay Chandran 2/57 (15 overs)

Madhya Pradesh won by 5 wickets
St Xavier's College Ground, Thumba
Umpires: Abhijit Bengeri and Abhijit Deshmukh
Player of the match: Vishnu Vinod (Madhya Pradesh)

- Kerala won the toss and elected to bat.
- Kumar Kartikeya (Madhya Pradesh) made his first-class debut.

28 November–1 December 2018
Scorecard

Himachal Pradesh	v	Hyderabad
351 (126.4 overs); Prashant Chopra 110 (190); Tanay Thyagarajan 4/86 (37 overs)		352 (130.5 overs); Akshath Reddy 99 (192); Arpit Guleria 3/64 (32 overs)
97 (45.2 overs); Sumeet Verma 19 (53); Ravi Kiran 4/34 (14 overs)		97/0 (28.2 overs); Tanmay Agarwal 48* (87)

Hyderabad won by 10 wickets
Rajiv Gandhi International Cricket Stadium, Hyderabad
Umpires: Yeshwant Barde and Sadashiv Iyer
Player of the match: Ravi Kiran (Hyderabad)

- Himachal Pradesh won the toss and elected to bat.
- Arpit Guleria (Himachal Pradesh) made his first-class debut.

28 November–1 December 2018
Scorecard

Delhi	v	Punjab
107 (42.5 overs); Kunwar Bidhuri 27 (70); Siddarth Kaul 6/32 (12.5 overs)		282 (91.5 overs); Mandeep Singh 90 (180); Simarjeet Singh 4/43 (17 overs)
179 (84.2 overs); Gautam Gambhir 60 (95); Vinay Choudhary 4/39 (33.2 overs)		8/0 (2.1 overs); Jiwanjot Singh 6* (7)

Punjab won by 10 wickets
Feroz Shah Kotla Ground, Delhi
Umpires: Rohan Pandit and Shawn Craig
Player of the match: Mandeep Singh (Punjab)

- Delhi won the toss and elected to bat.
- Kunwar Bidhuri (Delhi) made his first-class debut.
- This was Delhi's first loss at home in the Ranji Trophy in five years.

28 November–1 December 2018
Scorecard

Tamil Nadu	v	Bengal
263 (106 overs); Baba Aparajith 103 (273); Ishan Porel 5/48 (27 overs)		189 (63.5 overs); Abhishek Raman 98 (173); Rahil Shah 5/46 (18.5 overs)
141 (62.5 overs); Narayan Jagadeesan 38 (72); Writtick Chatterjee 5/22 (13.5 overs)		216/9 (82.5 overs); Abhishek Raman 53 (58); Rahil Shah 5/68 (25 overs)

Bengal won by 1 wicket
M. A. Chidambaram Stadium, Chennai
Umpires: Virender Sharma and Brad White
Player of the match: Abhishek Raman (Bengal)

- Tamil Nadu won the toss and elected to bat.
- Brad White of South Africa was part of an umpire exchange programme.

=== Round 5 ===
6–9 December 2018
Scorecard

Himachal Pradesh	v	Punjab
390 (145.1 overs); Ankit Kalsi 82 (152); Sandeep Sharma 5/101 (34 overs)		84 (35.1 overs); Vinay Choudhary 24 (41); Mayank Dagar 4/22 (13 overs)
		199 (81.5 overs) (f/o); Abhijeet Garg 48 (118); Gurvinder Singh 4/44 (23 overs)

Himachal Pradesh won by an innings and 107 runs
Punjab Cricket Association IS Bindra Stadium, Mohali
Umpires: Sanjay Hazare and Sudhir Asnani

- Punjab won the toss and elected to field.
- Abhijeet Garg (Punjab) and Praveen Thakur (Himachal Pradesh) both made their first-class debuts.

6–9 December 2018
Scorecard

Andhra	v	Delhi
390 (121 overs); Ricky Bhui 187 (270); Suboth Bhati 5/48 (27 overs)		433 (157.4 overs); Gautam Gambhir 112 (185); Manish Golamaru 3/129 (57 overs)
130 (59 overs); Shoaib Md Khan 44 (99); Shivank Vashisht 5/49 (20 overs)		41/2 (5 overs); Anuj Rawat 23 (17); Bandaru Ayyappa 2/19 (3 overs)

Match drawn
Feroz Shah Kotla, Delhi
Umpires: Ulhas Gandhe and Steve O'Shaughnessy
Player of the match: Ricky Bhui (Andhra)

- Delhi won the toss and elected to field.
- Jonty Sidhu and Shivank Vashisht (Delhi) both made their first-class debuts.

6–9 December 2018
Scorecard

Tamil Nadu	v	Kerala
268 (98 overs); Shahrukh Khan 92* (155); Sandeep Warrier 5/52 (25 overs)		152 (76.5 overs); Ponnan Rahul 59 (116); Rahil Shah 4/32 (19.5 overs)
252/7d (70.5 overs); Baba Indrajith 92 (148); Sijomon Joseph 4/51 (18.5 overs)		217 (89 overs); Sanju Samson 91 (192); T. Natarajan 5/41 (20 overs)

Tamil Nadu won by 151 runs
M. A. Chidambaram Stadium, Chennai
Umpires: Anil Dandekar and Nitin Menon
Player of the match: T. Natarajan (Tamil Nadu)

- Tamil Nadu won the toss and elected to bat.
- Shahrukh Khan (Tamil Nadu) made his first-class debut.

6–9 December 2018
Scorecard

Hyderabad	v	Madhya Pradesh
124 (35.3 overs); Himalay Agarwal 69* (76); Avesh Khan 7/24 (12.3 overs)		562/4d (140.4 overs); Ajay Rohera 267* (345); Ravi Kiran 2/103 (30 overs)
185 (65.5 overs); Rohit Rayudu 72 (185); Avesh Khan 5/30 (13.5 overs)

Madhya Pradesh won by an innings and 253 runs
Holkar Cricket Stadium, Indore
Umpires: Amiesh Saheba and Virender Sharma
Player of the match: Ajay Rohera (Madhya Pradesh)

- Madhya Pradesh won the toss and elected to field.
- Venkatesh Iyer and Ajay Rohera (Madhya Pradesh) both made their first-class debuts.
- Ajay Rohera (Madhya Pradesh) set a new record for the highest score on debut in a first-class match with 267 not out.

=== Round 6 ===
14–17 December 2018
Scorecard

Kerala	v	Delhi
320 (95.3 overs); Ponnan Rahul 77 (129); Shivam Sharma 6/98 (29.3 overs)		139 (66.2 overs); Jonty Sidhu 41 (124); Jalaj Saxena 6/39 (31 overs)
		154 (41) (f/o); Shivam Sharma 33 (56); Sandeep Warrier 3/39 (12 overs)

Kerala won by an innings and 27 runs
St Xavier's College Ground, Thumba
Umpires: Abhijit Bhattacharya and Vinod Seshan
Player of the match: Jalaj Saxena (Kerala)

- Kerala won the toss and elected to bat.
- Vathsal Govind (Kerala) made his first-class debut.

14–17 December 2018
Scorecard

Bengal	v	Hyderabad
336 (120.3 overs); Abhimanyu Easwaran 186 (337); Ravi Kiran 4/46 (26.3 overs)		312 (123.1 overs); Rohit Rayudu 93 (261); Mukesh Kumar 4/54 (27 overs)
49/1 (14 overs); Sudip Chatterjee 30* (43); Chama Milind 1/14 (5 overs)

Match drawn
Rajiv Gandhi International Cricket Stadium, Hyderabad
Umpires: Sai Darshan Kumar and Puttarangaiah Jayapal
Player of the match: Abhimanyu Easwaran (Bengal)

- Hyderabad won the toss and elected to field.
- KSK Chaitnay (Hyderabad) and Shahbaz Ahmed (Bengal) both made their first-class debuts.

14–17 December 2018
Scorecard

Andhra	v	Himachal Pradesh
173 (54.3 overs); Jyothi Krishna 74 (111); Pankaj Jaswal 5/50 (19 overs)		460 (144.4 overs); Ankit Kalsi 120 (247); Manish Golamaru 3/102 (31.4 overs)
284 (100.5 overs); Chengalpet Gnaneshwar 103 (191); Gurvinder Singh 3/62 (26 overs)

Himachal Pradesh won by an innings and 3 runs
Atal Bihari Vajpayee Stadium, Nadaun
Umpires: K. N. Ananthapadmanabhan and Rajesh Timaney
Player of the match: Pankaj Jaswal (Himachal Pradesh)

- Himachal Pradesh won the toss and elected to field.
- Chengalpet Gnaneshwar (Andhra) made his first-class debut.

14–17 December 2018
Scorecard

Tamil Nadu	v	Punjab
215 (85 overs); Vijay Shankar 71 (122); Manpreet Gony 5/55 (18 overs)		479 (118.5 overs); Shubman Gill 268 (328); Ravisrinivasan Sai Kishore 6/107 (33 overs)
383/6 (121 overs); Baba Indrajith 93 (196); Yuvraj Singh 2/29 (9 overs)

Match drawn
Punjab Cricket Association IS Bindra Stadium, Mohali
Umpires: Yeshwant Barde and Virender Sharma
Player of the match: Shubman Gill (Punjab)

- Punjab won the toss and elected to field.
- Shubman Gill (Punjab) scored his maiden double century in first-class cricket.

=== Round 7 ===
22–25 December 2018
Scorecard

Bengal	v	Andhra
300 (110.3 overs); Manoj Tiwary 90 (164); K. V. Sasikanth 5/55 (29 overs)		321 (119.3 overs); Chengalpet Gnaneshwar 66 (141); Mukesh Kumar 4/45 (22.3 overs)
223/7d (40.3 overs); Abhimanyu Easwaran 57 (76); Prithvi Raj 2/49 (12.3 overs)		170/7 (28 overs); Prasanth Kumar 90 (81); Ashok Dinda 3/50 (10 overs)

Match drawn
Dr. Y. S. Rajasekhara Reddy ACA–VDCA Cricket Stadium, Visakhapatnam
Umpires: Nitin Pandit and Krishnamachari Srinivasan
Player of the match: K. V. Sasikanth (Andhra)

- Andhra won the toss and elected to field.

22–25 December 2018
Scorecard

Hyderabad	v	Punjab
317 (109.3 overs); Himalay Agarwal 79 (171); Mayank Markande 6/84 (31.3 overs)		303 (93.5 overs); Gurkeerat Singh 87* (130); Ravi Teja 5/57 (19.5 overs)
323/3d (86 overs); Akshath Reddy 161* (218); Arpit Pannu 1/67 (12 overs)		324/8 (57 overs); Shubman Gill 148 (154); Mohammed Siraj 4/71 (15 overs)

Match drawn
Rajiv Gandhi International Cricket Stadium, Hyderabad
Umpires: K. N. Ananthapadmanabhan and Sudhir Asnani
Player of the match: Ravi Teja (Hyderabad)

- Hyderabad won the toss and elected to bat.

22–25 December 2018
Scorecard

Tamil Nadu	v	Himachal Pradesh
227 (78.4 overs); Baba Aparajith 53 (103); Pankaj Jaswal 3/45 (17 overs)		463 (116.2 overs); Ankit Kalsi 144* (230); T. Natarajan 5/122 (35.2 overs)
345 (118.3 overs); Abhinav Mukund 128 (214); Arpit Guleria 3/56 (26.3 overs)		111/1 (15.3 overs); Ankush Bains 64* (38); Ravisrinivasan Sai Kishore 1/36 (4.3 overs)

Himachal Pradesh won by 9 wickets
Himachal Pradesh Cricket Association Stadium, Dharamsala
Umpires: Anil Dandekar and Nitin Menon
Player of the match: Rishi Dhawan (Himachal Pradesh)

- Tamil Nadu won the toss and elected to bat.

22–25 December 2018
Scorecard

Madhya Pradesh	v	Delhi
132 (51.2 overs); Anand Bais 35 (73); Vikas Mishra 6/41 (18 overs)		261 (69.3 overs); Anuj Rawat 134 (183); Avesh Khan 6/51 (17 overs)
157 (64.3 overs); Anand Bais 46 (123); Vikas Mishra 6/30 (21 overs)		31/1 (6.4 overs); Hiten Dalal 15* (22); Kumar Kartikeya 1/8 (1.4 overs)

Delhi won by 9 wickets
Feroz Shah Kotla, Delhi
Umpires: Sanjay Hazare and Virender Sharma
Player of the match: Anuj Rawat (Delhi)

- Delhi won the toss and elected to field.
- The start of play was delayed by two-and-half-hours after the ground's curator had overwatered the pitch.

=== Round 8 ===
30 December 2018 – 2 January 2019
Scorecard

Madhya Pradesh	v	Himachal Pradesh
265 (98.3 overs); Shubham Sharma 54* (110); Pankaj Jaswal 4/56 (23 overs)		127 (55.3 overs); Raghav Dhawan 37 (129); Kumar Kartikeya 6/28 (19 overs)
193 (58.5 overs); Rajat Patidar 54 (101); Gurvinder Singh 6/63 (13.5 overs)		191 (44.4 overs); Pankaj Jaswal 44 (41); Kumar Kartikeya 3/58 (16.4 overs)

Madhya Pradesh won by 140 runs
Holkar Cricket Stadium, Indore
Umpires: Vineet Kulkarni and Yeshwant Barde
Player of the match: Kumar Kartikeya (Madhya Pradesh)

- Himachal Pradesh won the toss and elected to field.

30 December 2018 – 2 January 2019
Scorecard

Hyderabad	v	Andhra
271 (90.3 overs); Himalay Agarwal 59 (103); K. V. Sasikanth 5/64 (24 overs)		502/7d (154 overs); Srikar Bharat 178* (277); Mehdi Hasan 3/127 (49 overs)
251/5 (85 overs); Akshath Reddy 65 (98); Shoaib Md Khan 2/70 (18 overs)

Match drawn
Dr PVG Raju ACA Sports Complex, Vizianagaram
Umpires: Nitin Pandit and Krishnamachari Srinivasan
Player of the match: Srikar Bharat (Andhra)

- Andhra won the toss and elected to field.
- Tilak Varma and Ajay Dev Goud (Hyderabad) both made their first-class debuts.

30 December 2018 – 2 January 2019
Scorecard

Delhi	v	Bengal
240 (83.3 overs); Jonty Sidhu 85 (165); Ashok Dinda 4/62 (22 overs)		220 (58.4 overs); Sudip Chatterjee 56 (102); Suboth Bhati 3/28 (14 overs)
301 (96.4 overs); Suboth Bhati 62 (53); Ashok Dinda 5/88 (30 overs)		323/3 (70.2 overs); Abhimanyu Easwaran 183* (211); Kulwant Khejroliya 2/68 (16 overs)

Bengal won by 7 wickets
Eden Gardens, Kolkata
Umpires: Anil Dandekar and Saiyed Khalid
Player of the match: Abhimanyu Easwaran (Bengal)

- Delhi won the toss and elected to bat.

30 December 2018 – 2 January 2019
Scorecard

Kerala	v	Punjab
121 (37 overs); Vishnu Vinod 35 (52); Siddarth Kaul 6/55 (15 overs)		217 (75.2 overs); Mandeep Singh 89 (182); Sandeep Warrier 5/83 (27.2 overs)
223 (73.1 overs); Mohammed Azharuddeen 112 (168); Mayank Markande 4/56 (21 overs)		131/0 (27.4 overs); Shubman Gill 69* (73)

Punjab won by 10 wickets
Punjab Cricket Association IS Bindra Stadium, Mohali
Umpires: Jayaraman Madanagopal and Rohan Pandit
Player of the match: Siddarth Kaul (Punjab)

- Punjab won the toss and elected to field.

=== Round 9 ===
7–10 January 2019
Scorecard

Tamil Nadu	v	Delhi
432 (164.4 overs); Abhinav Mukund 134 (319); Vikas Mishra 5/142 (45.4 overs)		336 (133.1 overs); Jonty Sidhu 140 (320); Ravisrinivasan Sai Kishore 5/90 (43.1 overs)
113/1d (40 overs); Narayan Jagadeesan 59* (120); Lalit Yadav 1/9 (4 overs)

Match drawn
M. A. Chidambaram Stadium, Chennai
Umpires: Saiyed Khalid and Pashchim Pathak
Player of the match: Ravisrinivasan Sai Kishore (Tamil Nadu)

- Tamil Nadu won the toss and elected to bat.
- Pradosh Ranjan Paul and Mohan Prasath (Tamil Nadu) both made their first-class debuts.

7–10 January 2019
Scorecard

Bengal	v	Punjab
187 (69.1 overs); Shreevats Goswami 57 (100); Vinay Choudhary 6/62 (20.1 overs)		447 (131.3 overs); Anmolpreet Singh 126 (292); Mukesh Kumar 5/114 (31 overs)
432/6d (130 overs); Abhimanyu Easwaran 201* (373); Mayank Markande 3/123 (33 overs)		132/5 (15 overs); Manpreet Gony 58 (28); Pradipta Pramanik 1/33 (5 overs)

Match drawn
Eden Gardens, Kolkata
Umpires: Ulhas Gandhe and Vineet Kulkarni
Player of the match: Abhimanyu Easwaran (Bengal)

- Bengal won the toss and elected to bat.
- Shubman Gill (Punjab) scored his 1,000th run in first-class cricket.

7–10 January 2019
Scorecard

Himachal Pradesh	v	Kerala
297 (96.1 overs); Ankit Kalsi 101 (202); M. D. Nidheesh 6/88 (24 overs)		286 (87 overs); Ponnan Rahul 127 (254); Arpit Guleria 5/47 (22 overs)
285/8d (52.1 overs); Rishi Dhawan 85 (96); Sijomon Joseph 4/51 (12 overs)		299/5 (67 overs); Vinoop Manoharan 96 (143); Gurvinder Singh 2/58 (18 overs)

Kerala won by 5 wickets
Atal Bihari Vajpayee Stadium, Nadaun
Umpires: Sadashiv Iyer and C. K. Nandan
Player of the match: Vinoop Manoharan (Kerala)

- Kerala won the toss and elected to field.
- Ponnan Rahul (Kerala) scored his maiden century in first-class cricket.

7–10 January 2019
Scorecard

Andhra	v	Madhya Pradesh
132 (54.3 overs); Prasanth Kumar 29 (76); Ishwar Pandey 4/43 (15 overs)		91 (35.5 overs); Naman Ojha 30 (59); Girinath Reddy 6/29 (10.5 overs)
301 (101.1 overs); Karan Shinde 103* (215); Ishwar Pandey 3/55 (17.1 overs)		35 (16.5 overs); Yash Dubey 16 (32); K. V. Sasikanth 6/18 (8 overs)

Andhra won by 307 runs
Holkar Cricket Stadium, Indore
Umpires: Nitin Pandit and Virender Sharma
Player of the match: Karan Shinde (Andhra)

- Madhya Pradesh won the toss and elected to field.
- Karan Shinde (Andhra) made his first-class debut.
- Girinath Reddy (Madhya Pradesh) took his maiden five-wicket haul in first-class cricket.
- In Madhya Pradesh's second innings, they lost their last seven wickets for no runs, going from 35 for 3 to 35 all out, including Gaurav Yadav who was absent hurt.
