= 2020–21 Vijay Hazare Trophy Group D =

Cricket tournament

- Dates: 21 February – 1 March 2021
- Administrator: BCCI
- Cricket format: List A cricket
- Tournament format: Round-robin
- Participants: 6

The 2020–21 Vijay Hazare Trophy was the 19th season of the Vijay Hazare Trophy, a List A cricket tournament in India. It was contested by 38 teams, divided into six groups, with six teams in Group D. Delhi, Himachal Pradesh, Maharashtra, Mumbai, Puducherry and Rajasthan were placed in Group D, with all the matches taking place in Jaipur. Mumbai won Group D to qualify for the knockout stage of the tournament. Delhi finished as the third-best runners-up, advancing to the Eliminator match against Uttarakhand.

== Points table ==
Team	Pld	W	L	T	NR	Pts	NRR
Mumbai (Q)	5	5	0	0	0	20	+2.603
Delhi (Q)	5	4	1	0	0	16	+0.507
Maharashtra	5	3	2	0	0	12	+0.879
Rajasthan	5	1	4	0	0	4	–0.900
Himachal Pradesh	5	1	4	0	0	4	–1.223
Pondicherry	5	1	4	0	0	4	–1.880

- Top team advanced to the Knockout Stage

Advanced to the Eliminator

== Fixtures ==
=== Round 1 ===
21 February 2021
Scorecard

Delhi; 211/7 (50 overs)	v	Mumbai; 216/3 (31.5 overs)
Himmat Singh 106* (145); Dhawal Kulkarni 3/35 (10 overs)		Prithvi Shaw 105* (89); Lalit Yadav 2/32 (6 overs)

Mumbai won by 7 wickets
Jaipuria Vidyalaya Ground, Jaipur
Umpires: Jayaraman Madanagopal and Saurabh Dhote

- Mumbai won the toss and elected to field.
- Atif Attarwala (Mumbai), Jonty Sidhu and Shivank Vashisht (Delhi) all made their List A debuts.

21 February 2021
Scorecard

Maharashtra; 295/8 (50 overs)	v	Himachal Pradesh; 236 (48.3 overs)
Ruturaj Gaikwad 102 (109); Vaibhav Arora 4/45 (7 overs)		Abhimanyu Rana 46 (71); Rajvardhan Hangargekar 4/42 (10 overs)

Maharashtra won by 59 runs
KL Saini Ground, Jaipur
Umpires: Abhijit Deshmukh and Dharmesh Bhardwaj

- Maharashtra won the toss and elected to bat.
- Abhimanyu Rana, Akash Vasisht, Vaibhav Arora (Himachal Pradesh), Rajvardhan Hangargekar and Yash Nahar (Maharashtra) all made their List A debuts.
- Vaibhav Arora (Himachal Pradesh) took a hat-trick.

21 February 2021
Scorecard

Pondicherry; 273/6 (50 overs)	v	Rajasthan; 274/4 (46.1 overs)
Paras Dogra 101 (109); Shubham Sharma 2/34 (10 overs)		Manender Singh 115 (144); Anton Subikshan 3/55 (10 overs)

Rajasthan won by 6 wickets
Sawai Mansingh Stadium, Jaipur
Umpires: Mohamad Rafi and Navdeep Singh

- Rajasthan won the toss and elected to field.
- Anton Subikshan (Pondicherry) made his List A debut.

=== Round 2 ===
23 February 2021
Scorecard

Maharashtra; 279/9 (50 overs)	v	Mumbai; 280/4 (47.2 overs)
Yash Nahar 119 (133); Dhawal Kulkarni 5/44 (10 overs)		Shreyas Iyer 103* (99); Satyajeet Bachhav 3/59 (10 overs)

Mumbai won by 6 wickets
KL Saini Ground, Jaipur
Umpires: Abhijit Deshmukh and Dharmesh Bhardwaj

- Maharashtra won the toss and elected to bat.

23 February 2021
Scorecard

Delhi; 354/4 (50 overs)	v	Pondicherry; 175 (39.3 overs)
Nitish Rana 137 (106); Sagar Trivedi 2/66 (9 overs)		Suresh Kumar 42 (53); Kulwant Khejroliya 4/32 (8 overs)

Delhi won by 179 runs
Jaipuria Vidyalaya Ground, Jaipur
Umpires: Mohamad Rafi and Navdeep Singh

- Pondicherry won the toss and elected to field.
- Parandaman Thamaraikannan (Pondicherry) made his List A debut.

23 February 2021
Scorecard

Rajasthan; 199 (47.5 overs)	v	Himachal Pradesh; 201/6 (33.3 overs)
Mahipal Lomror 67 (101); Rishi Dhawan 6/27 (8.5 overs)		Rishi Dhawan 73* (64); Ravi Bishnoi 2/60 (10 overs)

Himachal Pradesh won by 4 wickets
Sawai Mansingh Stadium, Jaipur
Umpires: Krishnaraj Srinath and Puttarangaiah Jayapal

- Himachal Pradesh won the toss and elected to field.
- Akash Singh (Rajasthan) made his List A debut.

=== Round 3 ===
25 February 2021
Scorecard

Maharashtra; 277/6 (50 overs)	v	Rajasthan; 233 (48.1 overs)
Kedar Jadhav 101* (93); Ravi Bishnoi 3/55 (10 overs)		Mahipal Lomror 86 (88); Pradeep Dadhe 4/48 (10 overs)

Maharashtra won by 44 runs
Jaipuria Vidyalaya Ground, Jaipur
Umpires: Krishnaraj Srinath and Puttarangaiah Jayapal

- Rajasthan won the toss and elected to field.
- Ranjeet Nikam (Maharashtra) made his List A debut.

25 February 2021
Scorecard

Himachal Pradesh; 251/8 (50 overs)	v	Delhi; 252/4 (48.1 overs)
Nikhil Gangta 100* (126); Kulwant Khejroliya 2/30 (8 overs)		Kshitiz Sharma 67* (66); Mayank Dagar 2/40 (10 overs)

Delhi won by 6 wickets
KL Saini Ground, Jaipur
Umpires: Abhijit Deshmukh and Dharmesh Bhardwaj

- Delhi won the toss and elected to field.

25 February 2021
Scorecard

Mumbai; 457/4 (50 overs)	v	Pondicherry; 224 (38.1 overs)
Prithvi Shaw 227* (152); Pankaj Singh 2/79 (7 overs)		Damodaran Rohit 63 (68); Prashant Solanki 5/48 (10 overs)

Mumbai won by 233 runs
Sawai Mansingh Stadium, Jaipur
Umpires: Jayaraman Madanagopal and Saurabh Dhote

- Pondicherry won the toss and elected to field.
- Atharva Ankolekar and Prashant Solanki (Mumbai) both made their List A debuts.
- Prithvi Shaw (Mumbai) scored the highest individual total in the Vijay Hazare Trophy.
- Mumbai made the highest total in the Vijay Hazare Trophy.

=== Round 4 ===
27 February 2021
Scorecard

Pondicherry; 227/9 (50 overs)	v	Himachal Pradesh; 123 (34.5 overs)
Sheldon Jackson 104 (141); Rishi Dhawan 4/44 (10 overs)		Abhimanyu Rana 27 (48); Sagar Udeshi 4/35 (9.5 overs)

Pondicherry won by 104 runs
Jaipuria Vidyalaya Ground, Jaipur
Umpires: Krishnaraj Srinath and Puttarangaiah Jayapal

- Himachal Pradesh won the toss and elected to field.
- Kannan Vignesh, Premraj Rajavelu and Sridhar Ashwath (Pondicherry) all made their List A debuts.

27 February 2021
Scorecard

Mumbai; 317/7 (50 overs)	v	Rajasthan; 250 (42.2 overs)
Shreyas Iyer 116 (103); Shubham Sharma 3/59 (10 overs)		Mahipal Lomror 76 (69); Shardul Thakur 4/50 (8 overs)

Mumbai won by 67 runs
KL Saini Ground, Jaipur
Umpires: Mohamad Rafi and Navdeep Singh

- Mumbai won the toss and elected to bat.
- Arafat Khan (Rajasthan) made his List A debut.

27 February 2021
Scorecard

Maharashtra; 328/7 (50 overs)	v	Delhi; 330/7 (49.2 overs)
Kedar Jadhav 86 (81); Lalit Yadav 3/69 (10 overs)		Shikhar Dhawan 153 (118); Satyajeet Bachhav 3/68 (10 overs)

Delhi won by 3 wickets
Sawai Mansingh Stadium, Jaipur
Umpires: Jayaraman Madanagopal and Saurabh Dhote

- Maharashtra won the toss and elected to bat.

=== Round 5 ===
1 March 2021
Scorecard

Rajasthan; 294 (48.2 overs)	v	Delhi; 296/2 (44.4 overs)
Arjit Gupta 78 (51); Simarjeet Singh 4/36 (7.2 overs)		Himmat Singh 117* (96); Shubham Sharma 1/54 (9 overs)

Delhi won by 8 wickets
Jaipuria Vidyalaya Ground, Jaipur
Umpires: Abhijit Deshmukh and Dharmesh Bhardwaj

- Delhi won the toss and elected to field.
- Samarpit Joshi (Rajasthan) made his List A debut.

1 March 2021
Scorecard

Maharashtra; 333/4 (50 overs)	v	Pondicherry; 196 (43.2 overs)
Yash Nahar 119 (120); Sagar Udeshi 2/49 (10 overs)		Sagar Trivedi 79* (86); Rajvardhan Hangargekar 4/45 (8.2 overs)

Maharashtra won by 137 runs
KL Saini Ground, Jaipur
Umpires: Krishnaraj Srinath and Puttarangaiah Jayapal

- Pondicherry won the toss and elected to field.
- Ramachandran Ragupathy (Pondicherry) made his List A debut.

1 March 2021
Scorecard

Mumbai; 321/9 (50 overs)	v	Himachal Pradesh; 121 (24.1 overs)
Shardul Thakur 92 (57); Rishi Dhawan 4/84 (10 overs)		Mayank Dagar 38* (20); Prashant Solanki 4/31 (5 overs)

Mumbai won by 200 runs
Sawai Mansingh Stadium, Jaipur
Umpires: Mohamad Rafi and Navdeep Singh

- Mumbai won the toss and elected to bat.
- Mohit Avasthi (Mumbai) and Praveen Thakur (Himachal Pradesh) both made their List A debuts.
