= 2020–21 Syed Mushtaq Ali Trophy Group E =

Cricket tournament

2019–20 Syed Mushtaq Ali Trophy Group E
- Dates: 11 – 19 January 2021
- Administrator(s): BCCI
- Cricket format: Twenty20 cricket
- Tournament format(s): Round-robin
- Participants: 6

The 2020–21 Syed Mushtaq Ali Trophy was the twelfth season of the Syed Mushtaq Ali Trophy, a Twenty20 cricket tournament played in India. It was contested by 38 teams, divided into six groups, with six teams in Group E. Andhra Pradesh, Delhi, Haryana, Kerala, Mumbai and Pondicherry were placed in Group E, with all the matches taking place in Mumbai. Haryana won Group E to qualify for the knockout stage of the tournament.

== Points table ==
Team	Pld	W	L	T	NR	Pts	NRR
Haryana (Q)	5	5	0	0	0	20	+0.869
Kerala	5	3	2	0	0	12	+0.454
Delhi	5	3	2	0	0	12	+1.913
Pondicherry	5	2	3	0	0	8	–1.192
Andhra Pradesh	5	1	4	0	0	4	–0.593
Mumbai	5	1	4	0	0	4	–1.374

- Top team advanced to the Knockout Stage

== Fixtures ==
=== Round 1 ===
11 January 2021
Scorecard

Delhi; 206/4 (20 overs)	v	Mumbai; 130 (18.1 overs)
Nitish Rana 74 (37); Shams Mulani 2/43 (4 overs)		Shivam Dube 63 (42); Pradeep Sangwan 3/20 (4 overs)

Delhi won by 76 runs
Wankhede Stadium, Mumbai
Umpires: Rajesh Timaney and Yeshwant Barde

- Mumbai won the toss and elected to field.
- Ayush Badoni (Delhi) made his T20 debut.

11 January 2021
Scorecard

Andhra; 107/6 (20 overs)	v	Haryana; 108/4 (15.5 overs)
Ricky Bhui 39 (41); Jayant Yadav 2/13 (4 overs)		Chaitanya Bishnoi 42* (39); Naren Reddy 1/4 (0.5 overs)

Haryana won by 6 wickets
Bandra Kurla Complex Ground, Mumbai
Umpires: Jayaraman Madanagopal and Satrajit Lahiri

- Haryana won the toss and elected to field.
- Lalith Mohan (Andhra) made his T20 debut.

11 January 2021
Scorecard

Pondicherry; 138/6 (20 overs)	v	Kerala; 139/4 (18.2 overs)
Ashith Rajiv 33* (29); Jalaj Saxena 3/13 (4 overs)		Sanju Samson 32 (26); Ashith Rajiv 3/18 (4 overs)

Kerala won by 6 wickets
Wankhede Stadium, Mumbai
Umpires: Saidharshan Kumar and Tapan Sharma

- Pondicherry won the toss and elected to bat.
- Raghu Sharma (Pondicherry) made his T20 debut.

=== Round 2 ===
13 January 2021
Scorecard

Pondicherry; 148/4 (20 overs)	v	Haryana; 149/4 (19 overs)
Sheldon Jackson 82 (50); Arun Chaprana 2/19 (4 overs)		Himanshu Rana 58 (34); Pankaj Singh 2/31 (4 overs)

Haryana won by 6 wickets
Bandra Kurla Complex Ground, Mumbai
Umpires: Jayaraman Madanagopal and Satrajit Lahiri

- Haryana won the toss and elected to field.

13 January 2021
Scorecard

Andhra; 124/9 (20 overs)	v	Delhi; 128/4 (17 overs)
Ashwin Hebbar 32 (40); Pradeep Sangwan 3/33 (4 overs)		Anuj Rawat 33 (31); Harishankar Reddy 2/40 (4 overs)

Delhi won by 6 wickets
Wankhede Stadium, Mumbai
Umpires: Saidharshan Kumar and Tapan Sharma

- Delhi won the toss and elected to field.
- Dheeraj Kumar (Andhra) made his T20 debut.

13 January 2021
Scorecard

Mumbai; 196/7 (20 overs)	v	Kerala; 201/2 (15.5 overs)
Aditya Tare 42 (31); KM Asif 3/25 (4 overs)		Mohammed Azharuddeen 137* (54); Shams Mulani 1/41 (3 overs)

Kerala won by 8 wickets
Wankhede Stadium, Mumbai
Umpires: Rajesh Timaney and Yeshwant Barde

- Kerala won the toss and elected to field.
- Atharva Ankolekar (Mumbai) made his T20 debut.
- Mohammed Azharuddeen became the first batsman for Kerala to score a century in a T20 match.
- Mohammed Azharuddeen's century was the second-fastest in the Syed Mushtaq Ali Trophy, from 37 balls.
- This was Kerala's first win against Mumbai across any format of cricket.

=== Round 3 ===
15 January 2021
Scorecard

Delhi; 212/4 (20 overs)	v	Kerala; 218/4 (19 overs)
Shikhar Dhawan 77 (48); S. Sreesanth 2/46 (4 overs)		Robin Uthappa 91 (54); Lalit Yadav 1/33 (4 overs)

Kerala won by 6 wickets
Wankhede Stadium, Mumbai
Umpires: Rajesh Timaney and Yeshwant Barde

- Kerala won the toss and elected to field.

15 January 2021
Scorecard

Mumbai; 143 (19.3 overs)	v	Haryana; 144/2 (17.4 overs)
Atharva Ankolekar 37 (25); Jayant Yadav 4/22 (4 overs)		Himanshu Rana 75* (43); Arjun Tendulkar 1/34 (3 overs)

Haryana won by 8 wickets
Bandra Kurla Complex Ground, Mumbai
Umpires: Jayaraman Madanagopal and Satrajit Lahiri

- Mumbai won the toss and elected to bat.
- Arjun Tendulkar (Mumbai) made his T20 debut.

15 January 2021
Scorecard

Andhra; 226/4 (20 overs)	v	Pondicherry; 228/6 (19.2 overs)
Ambati Rayudu 62* (26); Sagar Udeshi 2/33 (4 overs)		Sheldon Jackson 106* (50); Harishankar Reddy 3/35 (4 overs)

Pondicherry won by 4 wickets
Wankhede Stadium, Mumbai
Umpires: Saidharshan Kumar and Tapan Sharma

- Pondicherry won the toss and elected to field.
- Kannan Vignesh (Pondicherry) made his T20 debut.

=== Round 4 ===
17 January 2021
Scorecard

Kerala; 112/4 (20 overs)	v	Andhra; 113/4 (17.1 overs)
Sachin Baby 51* (34); Manish Golamaru 2/19 (4 overs)		Ashwin Hebbar 48 (46); Jalaj Saxena 2/9 (4 overs)

Andhra won by 6 wickets
Bandra Kurla Complex Ground, Mumbai
Umpires: Jayaraman Madanagopal and Satrajit Lahiri

- Andhra won the toss and elected to field.

17 January 2021
Scorecard

Mumbai; 94 (19 overs)	v	Pondicherry; 95/4 (19 overs)
Shivam Dube 28 (25); Santha Moorthy 5/20 (4 overs)		S Karthik 26 (21); Shivam Dube 2/8 (4 overs)

Pondicherry won by 6 wickets
Wankhede Stadium, Mumbai
Umpires: Saidharshan Kumar and Tapan Sharma

- Pondicherry won the toss and elected to field.
- Jayaprakash Manikandan (Pondicherry) made his T20 debut.

17 January 2021
Scorecard

Delhi; 182/4 (20 overs)	v	Haryana; 183/5 (18.2 overs)
Nitish Rana 66 (34); Rahul Tewatia 1/20 (2 overs)		Rohit Sharma 48* (21); Lalit Yadav 3/38 (4 overs)

Haryana won by 5 wickets
Wankhede Stadium, Mumbai
Umpires: Rajesh Timaney and Yeshwant Barde

- Haryana won the toss and elected to field.

=== Round 5 ===
19 January 2021
Scorecard

Haryana; 198/6 (20 overs)	v	Kerala; 194/6 (20 overs)
Shivam Chauhan 59 (34); Jalaj Saxena 2/25 (3 overs)		Sachin Baby 68 (36); Sumit Kumar 2/16 (4 overs)

Haryana won by 4 runs
Wankhede Stadium, Mumbai
Umpires: Rajesh Timaney and Yeshwant Barde

- Kerala won the toss and elected to field.

19 January 2021
Scorecard

Delhi; 192/5 (20 overs)	v	Pondicherry; 82 (19.3 overs)
Kshitiz Sharma 65* (34); Ashith Rajiv 2/23 (3 overs)		Damodaran Rohit 14 (19); Shivank Vashisht 4/9 (4 overs)

Delhi won by 110 runs
Bandra Kurla Complex Ground, Mumbai
Umpires: Jayaraman Madanagopal and Satrajit Lahiri

- Pondicherry won the toss and elected to field.
- Jonty Sidhu, Shivank Vashisht, Siddhant Sharma (Delhi), and Premraj Rajavelu (Pondicherry) all made their T20 debuts.

19 January 2021
Scorecard

Andhra; 154/8 (20 overs)	v	Mumbai; 156/5 (18.5 overs)
Ricky Bhui 78 (48); Prathamesh Dake 3/23 (3 overs)		Sarfaraz Khan 53 (30); Harishankar Reddy 2/36 (3.5 overs)

Mumbai won by 5 wickets
Wankhede Stadium, Mumbai
Umpires: Saidharshan Kumar and Tapan Sharma

- Andhra won the toss and elected to bat.
- Aakarshit Gomel, Hardik Tamore (Mumbai) and Siraparapu Ashish (Andhra) all made their T20 debuts.
