= 2021–22 Vijay Hazare Trophy Group A =

Cricket tournament

- Dates: 8 – 27 December 2021
- Administrator(s): BCCI
- Cricket format: List A cricket
- Tournament format(s): Round-robin
- Participants: 6

The 2021–22 Vijay Hazare Trophy was the twentieth season of the Vijay Hazare Trophy, a List A cricket tournament that was played in India. It was contested by 38 teams, divided into six groups, with six teams in Group A. The tournament was announced by the BCCI on 3 July 2021. Himachal Pradesh won Group A to progress to the quarter-finals, with Vidarbha finishing in second place to advance to the preliminary quarter-finals.

== Points table ==
| Pos | Team | Pld | W | L | NR | Pts | NRR |
|---|---|---|---|---|---|---|---|
| 1 | Himachal Pradesh | 5 | 3 | 2 | 0 | 12 | 0.551 |
| 2 | Vidarbha | 5 | 3 | 2 | 0 | 12 | 0.210 |
| 3 | Andhra Pradesh | 5 | 3 | 2 | 0 | 12 | 0.042 |
| 4 | Odisha | 5 | 3 | 2 | 0 | 12 | −0.200 |
| 5 | Gujarat | 5 | 2 | 3 | 0 | 8 | −0.284 |
| 6 | Jammu and Kashmir | 5 | 1 | 4 | 0 | 4 | −0.280 |

Source: ESPN Cricinfo

Advanced to Quarter-final
Advanced to Preliminary quarter-final

== Fixtures ==
=== Round 1 ===
8 December 2021
Scorecard

| Odisha; 278/5 (50 overs) | v | Andhra Pradesh; 216 (46.3 overs) |
| Subhranshu Senapati 116 (120); Harishankar Reddy 2/63 (10 overs) | | Ricky Bhui 74 (102); Jayanta Behera 4/24 (10 overs) |

Odisha won by 63 runs
Bandra Kurla Complex, Mumbai
Umpires: Nikhil Patwardhan and Chettithody Shamshuddin

- Andhra Pradesh won the toss and elected to field.
- Sunil Roul (Odisha) made his List A debut.

8 December 2021
Scorecard

| Jammu and Kashmir; 171 (42.1 overs) | v | Gujarat; 172/5 (36.5 overs) |
| Parvez Rasool 76 (77); Chintan Gaja 4/30 (9 overs) | | Bhargav Merai 57* (83); Umar Nazir Mir 2/33 (8 overs) |

Gujarat won by 5 wickets
Brabourne Stadium, Mumbai
Umpires: Anil Dandekar and Vineet Kulkarni

- Gujarat won the toss and elected to field.

8 December 2021
Scorecard

| Himachal Pradesh; 213 (46 overs) | v | Vidarbha; 216/3 (39.5 overs) |
| Rishi Dhawan 61 (50); Yash Thakur 5/53 (9 overs) | | Yash Rathod 76* (78); Gurvinder Singh 2/39 (9 overs) |

Vidarbha won by 7 wickets
Dadoji Kondadev Stadium, Thane
Umpires: Pashchim Pathak and Akshay Totre

- Vidarbha won the toss and elected to field.
- Amit Thakur and Shubham Arora (Himachal Pradesh) both made their List A debuts.
- Yash Thakur (Vidarbha) took his first five-wicket haul in List A cricket.

=== Round 2 ===
9 December 2021
Scorecard

| Gujarat; 224/9 (50 overs) | v | Odisha; 225/7 (49.3 overs) |
| Kathan Patel 130* (166); Rajesh Mohanty 2/32 (10 overs) | | Abhishek Raut 60* (50); Siddharth Desai 3/30 (10 overs) |

Odisha won by 3 wickets
Bandra Kurla Complex, Mumbai
Umpires: Rohan Pandit and Vinod Seshan

- Odisha won the toss and elected to field.

9 December 2021
Scorecard

| Andhra Pradesh; 287/8 (50 overs) | v | Vidarbha; 288/2 (41.4 overs) |
| CR Gnaneshwar 93 (126); Aditya Sarwate 3/45 (10 overs) | | Atharva Taide 164* (123); Harishankar Reddy 1/23 (5 overs) |

Vidarbha won by 8 wickets
Brabourne Stadium, Mumbai
Umpires: Nikhil Patwardhan and Chettithody Shamshuddin

- Vidarbha won the toss and elected to field.

9 December 2021
Scorecard

| Himachal Pradesh; 250/8 (50 overs) | v | Jammu and Kashmir; 187 (42.3 overs) |
| Akash Vasisht 51* (28); Parvez Rasool 3/37 (10 overs) | | Ian Dev Singh 36 (55); Rishi Dhawan 3/44 (7.3 overs) |

Himachal Pradesh won by 63 runs
Dadoji Kondadev Stadium, Thane
Umpires: Anil Dandekar and Vineet Kulkarni

- Jammu and Kashmir won the toss and elected to field.

=== Round 3 ===
11 December 2021
Scorecard

| Himachal Pradesh; 310/9 (50 overs) | v | Gujarat; 213 (42.2 overs) |
| Prashant Chopra 73 (83); Chintan Gaja 4/71 (10 overs) | | Piyush Chawla 65 (61); Sumeet Verma 3/23 (6 overs) |

Himachal Pradesh won by 97 runs
Bandra Kurla Complex, Mumbai
Umpires: Pashchim Pathak and Akshay Totre

- Gujarat won the toss and elected to field.
- Saurav Chauhan (Gujarat) made his List A debut.

11 December 2021
Scorecard

| Jammu and Kashmir; 208 (48.3 overs) | v | Andhra Pradesh; 209/8 (49 overs) |
| Ram Dayal 116* (100); Girinath Reddy 4/29 (10 overs) | | Ricky Bhui 56 (77); Auqib Nabi 3/25 (10 overs) |

Andhra Pradesh won by 2 wickets
Brabourne Stadium, Mumbai
Umpires: Rohan Pandit and Vinod Seshan

- Jammu and Kashmir won the toss and elected to bat.
- Tripurana Vijay (Andhra Pradesh) made his List A debut.

11 December 2021
Scorecard

| Vidarbha; 148 (42.4 overs) | v | Odisha; 152/4 (42 overs) |
| Akshay Wadkar 41 (63); Abhishek Raut 5/36 (8 overs) | | Subhranshu Senapati 71* (113); Atharva Taide 2/8 (2 overs) |

Odisha won by 6 wickets
Dadoji Kondadev Stadium, Thane
Umpires: Nikhil Patwardhan and Chettithody Shamshuddin

- Odisha won the toss and elected to field.
- Ashish Rai (Odisha) made his List A debut.

=== Round 4 ===
12 December 2021
Scorecard

| Andhra Pradesh; 322/4 (50 overs) | v | Himachal Pradesh; 292 (50 overs) |
| K. S. Bharat 161* (109); Mayank Dagar 2/57 (10 overs) | | Rishi Dhawan 79 (61); Girinath Reddy 4/52 (8 overs) |

Andhra won by 30 runs
Bandra Kurla Complex, Mumbai
Umpires: Anil Dandekar and Vineet Kulkarni

- Himachal Pradesh won the toss and elected to field.
- Kavuri Saiteja (Andhra Pradesh) made his List A debut.

12 December 2021
Scorecard

| Gujarat; 363/6 (50 overs) | v | Vidarbha; 317 (48.3 overs) |
| Saurav Chauhan 141 (121); Yash Thakur 2/74 (10 overs) | | Ganesh Satish 110 (78); Chintan Gaja 3/49 (10 overs) |

Gujarat won by 46 runs
Brabourne Stadium, Mumbai
Umpires: Pashchim Pathak and Akshay Totre

- Vidarbha won the toss and elected to field.
- Umang Kumar (Gujarat) made his List A debut.

12 December 2021
Scorecard

| Jammu and Kashmir; 278/9 (50 overs) | v | Odisha; 183 (45 overs) |
| Henan Nazir 79 (94); Biplab Samantray 2/15 (3 overs) | | Abhishek Raut 40 (40); Abid Mushtaq 5/38 (10 overs) |

Jammu and Kashmir won by 95 runs
Dadoji Kondadev Stadium, Thane
Umpires: Rohan Pandit and Vinod Seshan

- Odisha won the toss and elected to field.

=== Round 5 ===
14 December 2021
Scorecard

| Jammu and Kashmir; 233 (49.3 overs) | v | Vidarbha; 236/5 (43 overs) |
| Fazil Rashid 73 (59); Aditya Sarwate 3/36 (10 overs) | | Faiz Fazal 102* (110); Ram Dayal 2/40 (8 overs) |

Vidarbha won by 5 wickets
Bandra Kurla Complex, Mumbai
Umpires: Nikhil Patwardhan and Chettithody Shamshuddin

- Vidarbha won the toss and elected to field.
- Lalit Yadav (Vidarbha) made his List A debut.

14 December 2021
Scorecard

| Himachal Pradesh; 360/5 (50 overs) | v | Odisha; 297 (45.1 overs) |
| Rishi Dhawan 91* (58); Jayanta Behera 2/46 (10 overs) | | Subhranshu Senapati 82 (76); Mayank Dagar 6/59 (10 overs) |

Himachal Pradesh won by 63 runs
Brabourne Stadium, Mumbai
Umpires: Vineet Kulkarni and Rohan Pandit

- Himachal Pradesh won the toss and elected to bat.
- Bikash Rout (Odisha) made his List A debut.

14 December 2021
Scorecard

| Andhra Pradesh; 253/9 (50 overs) | v | Gujarat; 172 (41.3 overs) |
| K. S. Bharat 156 (138); Tejas Patel 2/61 (10 overs) | | Umang Kumar 55 (66); Manish Golamaru 4/30 (9 overs) |

Andhra Pradesh won by 81 runs
Dadoji Kondadev Stadium, Thane
Umpires: Pashchim Pathak and Akshay Totre

- Gujarat won the toss and elected to field.
