= 2019–20 Syed Mushtaq Ali Trophy Group B =

Cricket tournament

- Dates: 8 – 17 November 2019
- Administrator(s): BCCI
- Cricket format: Twenty20 cricket
- Tournament format(s): Round-robin
- Participants: 7

The 2019–20 Syed Mushtaq Ali Trophy was the eleventh season of the Syed Mushtaq Ali Trophy, a Twenty20 cricket tournament in India. It was contested by 38 teams, divided into five groups, with seven teams in Group B. The group stage started on 8 November 2019. The top two teams from Group B progressed to the Super League section of the competition. Following the conclusion of matches played on 17 November 2019, Tamil Nadu and Rajasthan had progressed to the Super League stage of the tournament.

== Points table ==
Team	Pld	W	L	T	NR	Pts	NRR
Tamil Nadu	6	5	1	0	0	20	+3.195
Rajasthan	6	4	2	0	0	16	+1.938
Vidarbha	6	4	2	0	0	16	+0.566
Kerala	6	4	2	0	0	16	+0.503
Uttar Pradesh	6	3	3	0	0	12	−0.509
Tripura	6	1	5	0	0	4	−1.983
Manipur	6	0	6	0	0	0	−3.929

- Top two teams advanced to the Super League

== Fixtures ==
=== Round 1 ===
8 November 2019
Scorecard

Tamil Nadu; 174/5 (20 overs)	v	Kerala; 137/8 (20 overs)
Baba Aparajith 35 (26); Basil Thampi 3/49 (4 overs)		Rohan Kunnummal 34 (27); T. Natarajan 3/25 (4 overs)

Tamil Nadu won by 37 runs
Greenfield International Stadium, Thiruvananthapuram
Umpires: Anil Dandekar and Rohan Pandit

- Kerala won the toss and elected to field.
- Ponnan Rahul (Kerala) and Ganeshan Periyaswamy (Tamil Nadu) both made their T20 debuts.

8 November 2019
Scorecard

Tripura; 102/8 (20 overs)	v	Vidarbha; 103/1 (12.3 overs)
Saurabh Das 30* (31); Darshan Nalkande 3/25 (4 overs)		Faiz Fazal 54 (40); Harmeet Singh 1/20 (2.4 overs)

Vidarbha won by 9 wickets
Greenfield International Stadium, Thiruvananthapuram
Umpires: Abhijit Bengeri and Virender Sharma

- Vidarbha won the toss and elected to field.
- Arkaprabha Sinha (Tripura) made his T20 debut.

8 November 2019
Scorecard

Rajasthan; 171/4 (20 overs)	v	Manipur; 74/9 (20 overs)
Manender Singh 77 (51); Sultan Karim 3/33 (3 overs)		Kangabam Singh 55* (65); Tanveer Ul-Haq 4/7 (4 overs)

Rajasthan won by 97 runs
St Xavier's College Ground, Thumba
Umpires: Abhijit Bengeri and Virender Sharma

- Rajasthan won the toss and elected to bat.
- Johnson Singh, Nitesh Sedai, Rex Rajkumar and Al Bashid Muhammed (Manipur) all made their T20 debuts.

=== Round 2 ===
9 November 2019
Scorecard

Manipur; 93/8 (20 overs)	v	Tripura; 97/5 (15.1 overs)
Al Bashid Muhammed 24 (31); Manisankar Murasingh 1/5 (3 overs)		Udiyan Bose 29 (9); Rex Rajkumar 3/26 (3.1 overs)

Tripura won by 5 wickets
Greenfield International Stadium, Thiruvananthapuram
Umpires: Rohan Pandit and Virender Sharma

- Manipur won the toss and elected to field.

9 November 2019
Scorecard

Tamil Nadu; 169/5 (20 overs)	v	Rajasthan; 116/8 (20 overs)
Dinesh Karthik 48 (30); Akash Singh 2/26 (4 overs)		Mahipal Lomror 32 (36); Ravisrinivasan Sai Kishore 3/19 (4 overs)

Tamil Nadu won by 39 runs
Greenfield International Stadium, Thiruvananthapuram
Umpires: Abhijit Bengeri and Anil Dandekar

- Rajasthan won the toss and elected to field.
- Akash Singh (Rajasthan) made his T20 debut.

9 November 2019
Scorecard

Uttar Pradesh; 60 (14.4 overs)	v	Vidarbha; 62/1 (7.5 overs)
Mohsin Khan 15 (11); Darshan Nalkande 5/18 (3.4 overs)		Akshay Kolhar 29* (24); Kuldeep Yadav 1/10 (2 overs)

Vidarbha won by 9 wickets
Greenfield International Stadium, Thiruvananthapuram
Umpires: Rohan Pandit and Virender Sharma

- Uttar Pradesh won the toss and elected to bat.
- Hardeep Singh (Uttar Pradesh) made his T20 debut.

=== Round 3 ===
11 November 2019
Scorecard

Vidarbha; 150/6 (20 overs)	v	Manipur; 80/9 (20 overs)
Jitesh Sharma 73* (50); Ajay Lamabam 1/19 (3 overs)		Jayanta Sagatpam 36 (56); Yash Thakur 4/5 (4 overs)

Vidarbha won by 70 runs
Greenfield International Stadium, Thiruvananthapuram
Umpires: Anil Dandekar and Virender Sharma

- Vidarbha won the toss and elected to bat.
- Jayanta Sagatpam and Thomas Moirangthem (Manipur) both made their T20 debuts.

11 November 2019
Scorecard

Tamil Nadu; 168/7 (20 overs)	v	Uttar Pradesh; 174/5 (19.5 overs)
Dinesh Karthik 61 (41); Mohsin Khan 2/13 (4 overs)		Upendra Yadav 70* (41); Ganeshan Periyaswamy 2/35 (4 overs)

Uttar Pradesh won by 5 wickets
Greenfield International Stadium, Thiruvananthapuram
Umpires: Abhijit Bengeri and Rohan Pandit

- Uttar Pradesh won the toss and elected to field.
- Sameer Choudhary (Uttar Pradesh) made his T20 debut.

11 November 2019
Scorecard

Kerala; 191/7 (20 overs)	v	Tripura; 177/8 (20 overs)
Sachin Baby 58 (28); Manisankar Murasingh 2/42 (4 overs)		Milind Kumar 54 (36); Jalaj Saxena 4/26 (4 overs)

Kerala won by 14 runs
St Xavier's College Ground, Thumba
Umpires: Abhijit Bengeri and Rohan Pandit

- Tripura won the toss and elected to field.
- Neelambuj Vats (Tripura) made his T20 debut.

=== Round 4 ===
12 November 2019
Scorecard

Kerala; 149/9 (20 overs)	v	Manipur; 74/7 (20 overs)
Sachin Baby 48 (35); Bishworjit Konthoujam 3/28 (4 overs)		Johnson Singh 27 (42); Sudhesan Midhun 4/5 (4 overs)

Kerala won by 75 runs
Greenfield International Stadium, Thiruvananthapuram
Umpires: Anil Dandekar and Rohan Pandit

- Manipur won the toss and elected to field.
- Basir Rahman and Somorjit Salam (Manipur) both made their T20 debuts.

12 November 2019
Scorecard

Tripura; 49/6 (6 overs)	v	Uttar Pradesh; 50/3 (5.2 overs)
Manisankar Murasingh 20 (11); Ankit Rajpoot 5/17 (2 overs)		Akshdeep Nath 28* (14); Ajoy Sarkar 2/22 (2 overs)

Uttar Pradesh won by 7 wickets
St Xavier's College Ground, Thumba
Umpires: Abhijit Bengeri and Virender Sharma

- Uttar Pradesh won the toss and elected to field.
- The match was reduced to 6 overs per side due to rain.
- Shanu Saini (Uttar Pradesh) made his T20 debut.

12 November 2019
Scorecard

Vidarbha; 99/9 (13 overs)	v	Rajasthan; 105/8 (13 overs)
Akshay Kolhar 24 (19); Deepak Chahar 4/18 (3 overs)		Manender Singh 44 (17); Akshay Wakhare 3/15 (3 overs)

Vidarbha won by 1 run (VJD method)
Greenfield International Stadium, Thiruvananthapuram
Umpires: Anil Dandekar and Rohan Pandit

- Vidarbha won the toss and elected to bat.
- The match was reduced to 13 overs per side due to rain.

=== Round 5 ===
14 November 2019
Scorecard

Kerala; 162/7 (20 overs)	v	Vidarbha; 136/7 (20 overs)
Robin Uthappa 69* (39); Darshan Nalkande 3/34 (4 overs)		Akshay Wadkar 29 (27); Sandeep Warrier 3/29 (4 overs)

Kerala won by 26 runs
St Xavier's College Ground, Thumba
Umpires: Abhijit Bengeri and Virender Sharma

- Vidarbha won the toss and elected to field.
- Akshay Chandran (Kerala) made his T20 debut.

14 November 2019
Scorecard

Uttar Pradesh; 164/9 (20 overs)	v	Rajasthan; 166/5 (17.2 overs)
Rinku Singh 50 (29); Khaleel Ahmed 3/34 (4 overs)		Ravi Bishnoi 87* (43); Mohsin Khan 2/28 (4 overs)

Rajasthan won by 5 wickets
Greenfield International Stadium, Thiruvananthapuram
Umpires: Anil Dandekar and Rohan Pandit

- Rajasthan won the toss and elected to field.

14 November 2019
Scorecard

Manipur; 55 (18.4 overs)	v	Tamil Nadu; 58/1 (4.1 overs)
Homendro Kabrambam 9 (9); T. Natarajan 3/7 (3.4 overs)		Murali Vijay 33 (14)

Tamil Nadu won by 9 wickets
Greenfield International Stadium, Thiruvananthapuram
Umpires: Anil Dandekar and Rohan Pandit

- Tamil Nadu won the toss and elected to field.

=== Round 6 ===
15 November 2019
Scorecard

Kerala; 164/6 (20 overs)	v	Rajasthan; 167/3 (17 overs)
Sanju Samson 53 (39); Khaleel Ahmed 2/28 (4 overs)		Rajesh Bishnoi 76* (51); KM Asif 1/16 (3 overs)

Rajasthan won by 7 wickets
Greenfield International Stadium, Thiruvananthapuram
Umpires: Abhijit Bengeri and Rohan Pandit

- Rajasthan won the toss and elected to field.

15 November 2019
Scorecard

Manipur; 89/7 (20 overs)	v	Uttar Pradesh; 93/3 (12.4 overs)
Rex Rajkumar 30 (24); Mohsin Khan 2/9 (4 overs)		Rinku Singh 39* (27); Bishworjit Konthoujam 1/6 (2 overs)

Uttar Pradesh won by 7 wickets
St Xavier's College Ground, Thumba
Umpires: Anil Dandekar and Virender Sharma

- Manipur won the toss and elected to bat.

15 November 2019
Scorecard

Tripura; 79/8 (20 overs)	v	Tamil Nadu; 80/2 (12.1 overs)
Saurabh Das 44 (50); Ravisrinivasan Sai Kishore 4/6 (4 overs)		Washington Sundar 46 (32); Pratyush Singh 1/7 (2 overs)

Tamil Nadu won by 8 wickets
Greenfield International Stadium, Thiruvananthapuram
Umpires: Abhijit Bengeri and Rohan Pandit

- Tripura won the toss and elected to bat.

=== Round 7 ===
17 November 2019
Scorecard

Tripura; 69/7 (16 overs)	v	Rajasthan; 74/1 (5 overs)
Milind Kumar 22* (19); Aniket Choudhary 3/15 (3 overs)		Mahipal Lomror 50* (18); Manisankar Murasingh 1/17 (2 overs)

Rajasthan won by 9 wickets
St Xavier's College Ground, Thumba
Umpires: Anil Dandekar and Virender Sharma

- Rajasthan won the toss and elected to field.

17 November 2019
Scorecard

Tamil Nadu; 168/8 (20 overs)	v	Vidarbha; 55 (14.5 overs)
Dinesh Karthik 58 (32); Yash Thakur 3/23 (4 overs)		Tushar Gill 16 (18); Ravisrinivasan Sai Kishore 3/9 (3.5 overs)

Tamil Nadu won by 113 runs
Greenfield International Stadium, Thiruvananthapuram
Umpires: Abhijit Bengeri and Rohan Pandit

- Vidarbha won the toss and elected to field.
- Tushar Gill (Vidarbha) made his T20 debut.

17 November 2019
Scorecard

Kerala; 119/8 (20 overs)	v	Uttar Pradesh; 42/4 (7 overs)
Sanju Samson 38 (28); Mohsin Khan 2/15 (4 overs)		Akshdeep Nath 30* (27); Jalaj Saxena 2/11 (2 overs)

Kerala won by 1 run (VJD method)
Greenfield International Stadium, Thiruvananthapuram
Umpires: Abhijit Bengeri and Rohan Pandit

- Kerala won the toss and elected to bat.
