= 2015–16 Syed Mushtaq Ali Trophy Group C =

- Dates: 2 January 2016 – 10 January 2016
- Administrator(s): BCCI
- Cricket format: Twenty20 cricket
- Tournament format(s): Round robin
- Host(s): Baroda
- Participants: 7
- Matches: 21

2015–16 Syed Mushtaq Ali Trophy is the seventh season of the Syed Mushtaq Ali Trophy, a Twenty20 cricket tournament in India. It is contested by 27 domestic cricket teams of India. Group C consisted of Madhya Pradesh, Andhra, Delhi, Railways, Baroda, Assam and Goa.

== Round 1 ==
2 January 2016
Scorecard

Andhra; 95/9 (20 overs)	v	Madhya Pradesh; 96/5 (18.2 overs)

Madhya Pradesh won by 5 wickets
Reliance Stadium, Vadodara

- Ankit Kushwah (Madhya Pradesh) made his T20 debut.
- Ishwar Pandey (Madhya Pradesh) took a hat-trick in this match.

2 January 2016
Scorecard

Baroda; 165/8 (20 overs)	v	Assam; 116/9 (20 overs)

Baroda won by 49 runs
Reliance Stadium, Vadodara

- Krishna Das (Assam) and Mrunal Devdhar (Baroda) both made their T20 debuts.

2 January 2016
Scorecard

Railways; 210/2 (20 overs)	v	Delhi; 214/6 (19.2 overs)

Delhi won by 4 wickets
Alembic Ground, Vadodara

- Suboth Bhati, Sarthak Ranjan, Navdeep Saini (Delhi); Karan Mahajan and Akshat Pandey (Railways) all made their T20 debuts.

== Round 2 ==
3 January 2016
Scorecard

Goa; 104/6 (20 overs)	v	Madhya Pradesh; 106/3 (15.5 overs)

Madhya Pradesh won by 7 wickets
Moti Bagh Stadium, Vadodara

- Snehal Kauthankar (Goa) made his T20 debut.

3 January 2016
Scorecard

Delhi; 236/9 (20 overs)	v	Andhra; 125 (19.2 overs)

Delhi won by 111 runs
Alembic Ground, Vadodara

3 January 2016
Scorecard

Baroda; 142/5 (20 overs)	v	Railways; 133/6 (20 overs)

Baroda won by 9 runs
Moti Bagh Stadium, Vadodara

- Soaeb Tai (Baroda) and V Cheluvaraj (Railways) both made their T20 debuts.

== Round 3 ==
4 January 2016
Scorecard

Railways; 122/9 (20 overs)	v	Andhra; 115 (19.4 overs)

Railways won by 7 runs
Moti Bagh Stadium, Vadodara

- Girinath Reddy and Karan Shinde (Andhra) both made their T20 debuts.

4 January 2016
Scorecard

Goa; 132/7 (20 overs)	v	Assam; 133/6 (19.3 overs)

Assam won by 4 wickets
Reliance Stadium, Vadodara

- Mrinmoy Dutta (Assam) and Felix Alemao (Goa) both made their T20 debuts.

4 January 2016
Scorecard

Madhya Pradesh; 156/6 (20 overs)	v	Delhi; 160/6 (19.5 overs)

Delhi won by 4 wickets
Reliance Stadium, Vadodara

- Sarang Rawat (Delhi) made his T20 debut.

== Round 4 ==
6 January 2016
Scorecard

Baroda; 154/2 (20 overs)	v	Goa; 82 (15.4 overs)

Baroda won by 72 runs
Moti Bagh Stadium, Vadodara

6 January 2016
Scorecard

Assam; 44 (12.1 overs)	v	Delhi; 50/2 (9.1 overs)

Delhi won by 8 wickets
Moti Bagh Stadium, Vadodara

6 January 2016
Scorecard

Railways; 103 (20 overs)	v	Madhya Pradesh; 104/4 (16.2 overs)

Madhya Pradesh won by 6 wickets
Reliance Stadium, Vadodara

- Ashwin Das (Madhya Pradesh) made his T20 debut.

== Round 5 ==
7 January 2016
Scorecard

Andhra; 117/8 (20 overs)	v	Assam; 105 (19.3 overs)

Andhra won by 12 runs
Moti Bagh Stadium, Vadodara

- Karthik Raman (Andhra) made his T20 debut.

7 January 2016
Scorecard

Railways; 165/8 (20 overs)	v	Goa; 116/9 (20 overs)

Railways won by 49 runs
Reliance Stadium, Vadodara

- Kashyap Bakhale (Goa) made his T20 debut.

7 January 2016
Scorecard

Baroda; 181/5 (20 overs)	v	Madhya Pradesh; 128 (16.4 overs)

Baroda won by 53 runs
Reliance Stadium, Vadodara

== Round 6 ==
9 January 2016
Scorecard

Railways; 142/8 (20 overs)	v	Assam; 147/5 (18.2 overs)

Assam won by 5 wickets
Reliance Stadium, Vadodara

- Saahil Jain and Wasiqur Rahman (Assam) both made their T20 debuts.

9 January 2016
Scorecard

Delhi; 91 (19.2 overs)	v	Goa; 89/9 (20 overs)

Delhi won by 2 runs
Moti Bagh Stadium, Vadodara

- Akash Sudan (Delhi) made his T20 debut.

9 January 2016
Scorecard

Andhra; 91/9 (20 overs)	v	Baroda; 93/7 (16.5 overs)

Baroda won by 3 wickets
Moti Bagh Stadium, Vadodara

== Round 7 ==
10 January 2016
Scorecard

Assam; 138/6 (20 overs)	v	Madhya Pradesh; 140/5 (19.4 overs)

Madhya Pradesh won by 5 wickets
Reliance Stadium, Vadodara

- Jogeswar Bhumij (Assam), Ashutosh Singh, Ayaan Khan and Mihir Hirwani (Madhya Pradesh) all made their T20 debuts.

10 January 2016
Scorecard

Andhra; 97/7 (20 overs)	v	Goa; 98/1 (14.5 overs)

Goa won by 9 wickets
Alembic Ground, Vadodara

- Ajay Kumar (Andhra) made his T20 debut.

10 January 2016
Scorecard

Baroda; 153/6 (20 overs)	v	Delhi; 156/5 (19.3 overs)

Delhi won by 5 wickets
Reliance Stadium, Vadodara
