= List of Punjab Kings cricketers =

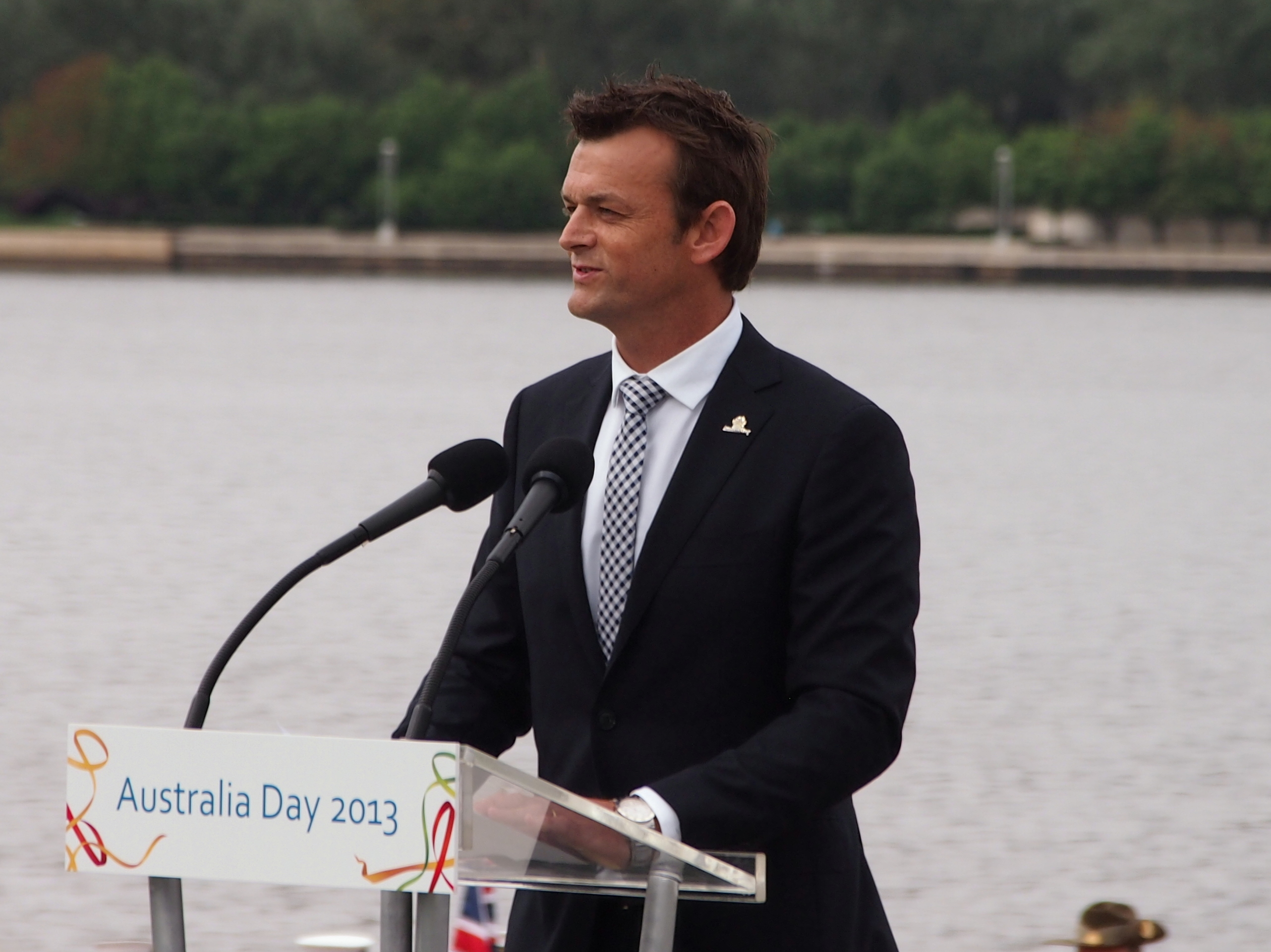
Adam Gilchrist was a captain of KXIP in 2011–2013.

Punjab Kings, formerly called Kings XI Punjab (KXIP), is a franchise cricket team based in Mohali, Punjab in India, and is one of the teams participating in the Indian Premier League (IPL). KXIP was founded in 2008. The franchise is owned by actress Preity Zinta, Ness Wadia of Bombay Dyeing, Karan Paul of the Apeejay Surendera Group and Mohit Burman of Dabur. The group paid US$76 million to acquire the franchise. It is owned by a consortium, along with the Rajasthan Royals. Along with the Rajasthan Royals, KXIP's franchise agreement was terminated by the Board of Control for Cricket in India (BCCI) in October 2010, because the teams had been signed by people who were not members of the consortium which owned the team. A petition of arbitration (appeal) was filed to the Bombay High Court in November 2010, challenging the decision, which was accepted a month later.

KXIP played their first Twenty20 match in 2008 during the first season of the IPL, where they reached the semi-final. They lost the 2008 semi-final to Chennai Super Kings on 31 May 2008, after playing fourteen matches in the league, winning ten matches and losing four. With ten international cricketers in 2009, they finished fifth in the second season of the IPL, winning and losing seven matches. KXIP finished in eighth place in the third IPL season, losing eleven of their fourteen matches. KXIP improved in the fourth season of the IPL, finishing in fifth place with seven losses and victories. In the IPL's fifth season in 2012, the team played sixteen matches, winning eight and losing nine to finish in sixth position. In the 2013 season, they won eight matches out of sixteen, and lost the other eight. In the 2014 season, they won 11 of 14 matches. In the 2015 season, KXIP won three of fourteen matches and finished in last position. In the IPL's ninth season, KXIP won four of fourteen matches and finished in last position. In the 2017 season, KXIP won seven of fourteen matches to finish in fifth position.

KL Rahul is KXIP's leading run scorer, with 2,548 runs. He, along with Mahela Jayawardene, Adam Gilchrist, Shaun Marsh, Hashim Amla, David Miller, Virender Sehwag, Wriddhiman Saha, Paul Valthaty, Mayank Agarwal, and Chris Gayle has scored a century for the team. Miller's batting average of 43.72 is the highest in the team. Piyush Chawla has played 87 matches, the most by any KXIP player. Saha has effected the most stumpings in the team.

The first list includes all players who have played in at least one match for KXIP and is initially listed alphabetically by their last name. (Note: Sorting as such may actually be considered incorrect, especially for players like Mohammed Kaif, where their last name is used in a different manner to that of western names, but are listed as such for continuity with other lists and ease of understanding the page.) The second list comprises all those players who have captained the team in at least one match, arranged in the order of the first match as captain. Many players have also represented other teams of the IPL, but only the records of their games for KXIP are given. (Note: To sort these tables by any statistic, click on the icon in the column title.) (Note: These statistics are correct as of 2013 Indian Premier League.)

== Key ==
General

- § – Member of the current squad
- † – Captain
- ‡ – Wicket-keeper
- First – Year of Twenty20 debut for Kings
- Last – Year of latest Twenty20 match for Kings
- Mat – Number of matches played

Fielding

- Ca – Catches taken
- St – Stumpings effected

Batting

- Inn – Number of innings batted
- NO – Number of innings not out
- Runs – Runs scored in career
- HS – Highest score
- 100 – Centuries scored
- 50 – Half-centuries scored
- Avg – Runs scored per dismissal
- SR - Batsman scoring rate
- * – Batsman remained not out

Bowling

- Balls – Balls bowled in career
- Wkt – Wickets taken in career
- BBI – Best bowling in an innings
- ER - Average number of runs conceded per over (Note: Average runs concede by bowlers while playing for PBKS.)
- Ave – Average runs per wicket

Captains

- Won – Number of games won
- Lost – Number of games lost
- NR – Number of games with no result
- Win% – Percentage of games won to those captained (Note: Games that did not have a result are included in calculating the win percentage.) (Note: The Win–loss percentage is calculated using the formula: $\frac{Wins+\frac{1}{2}Ties}{Games}$)

== Players ==
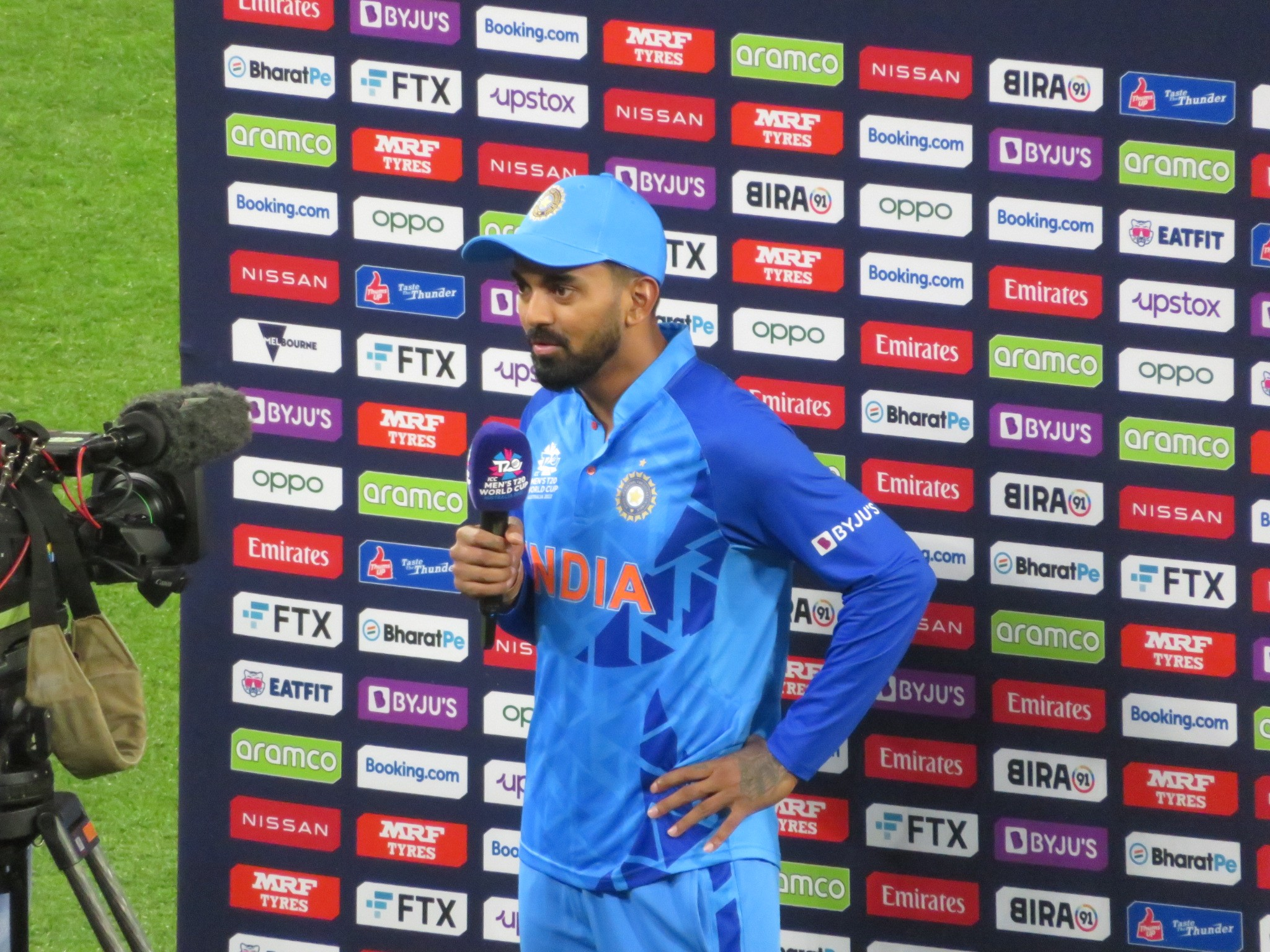
KL Rahul has scored the most runs for Punjab Kings

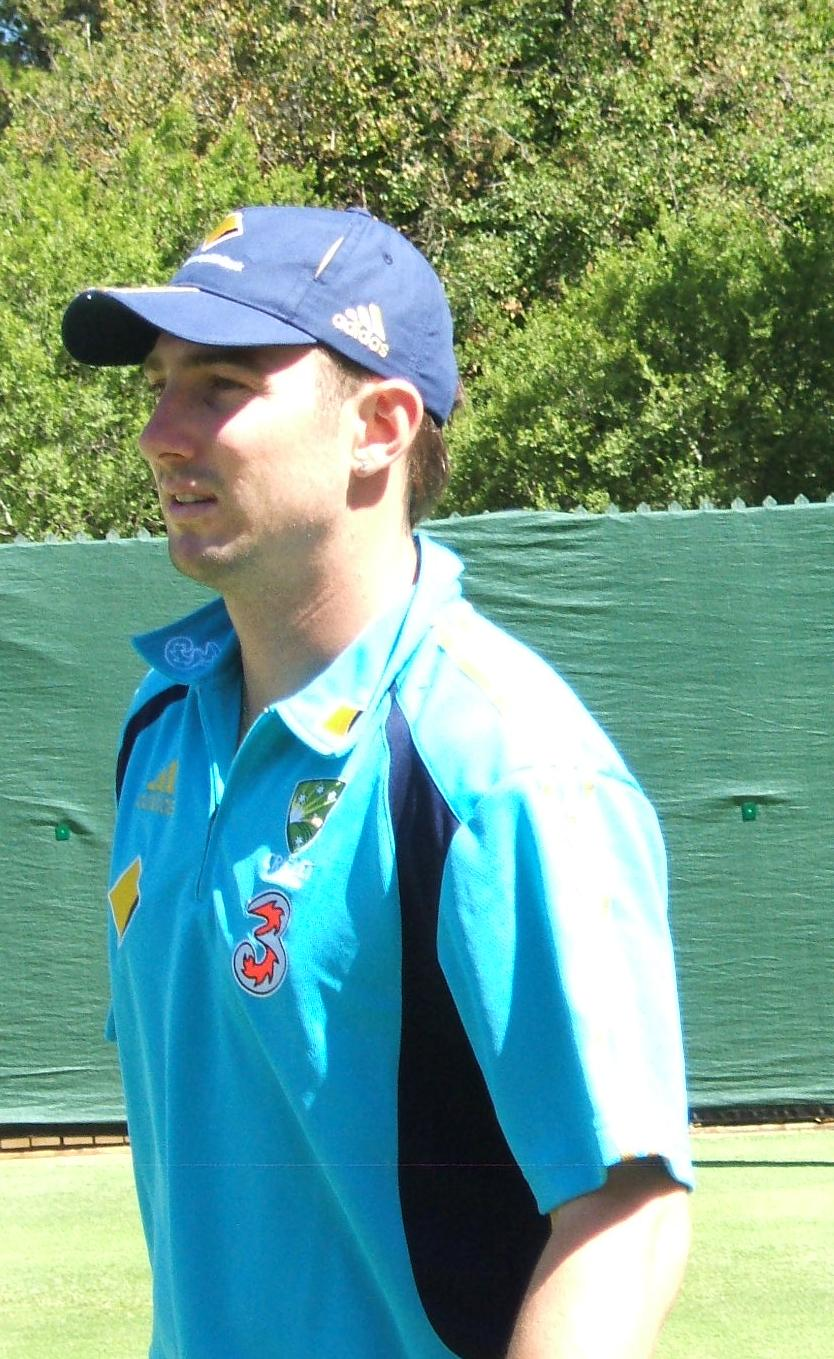
Shaun Marsh has scored the second-most half-centuries for Punjab Kings, after KL Rahul.

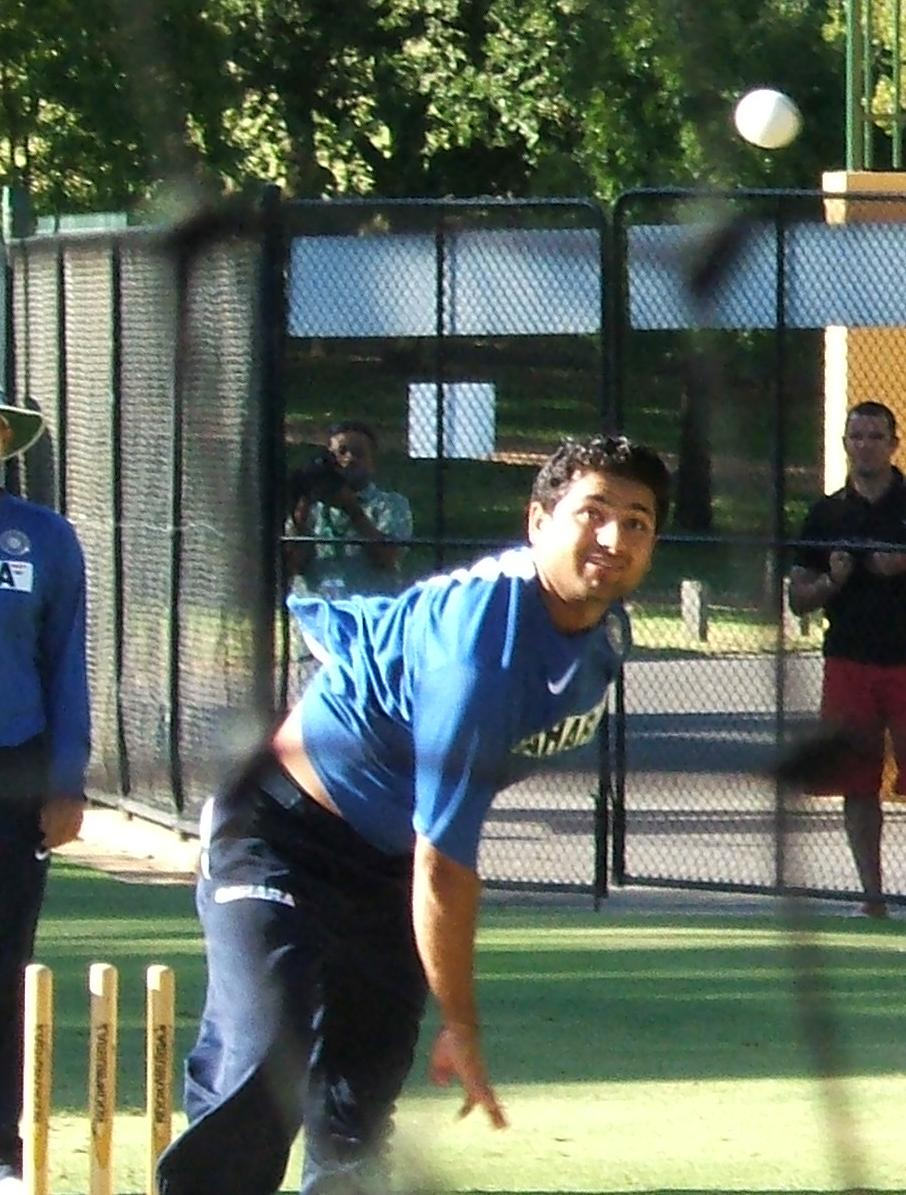
Arshdeep Singh has played the most matches for Punjab Kings.

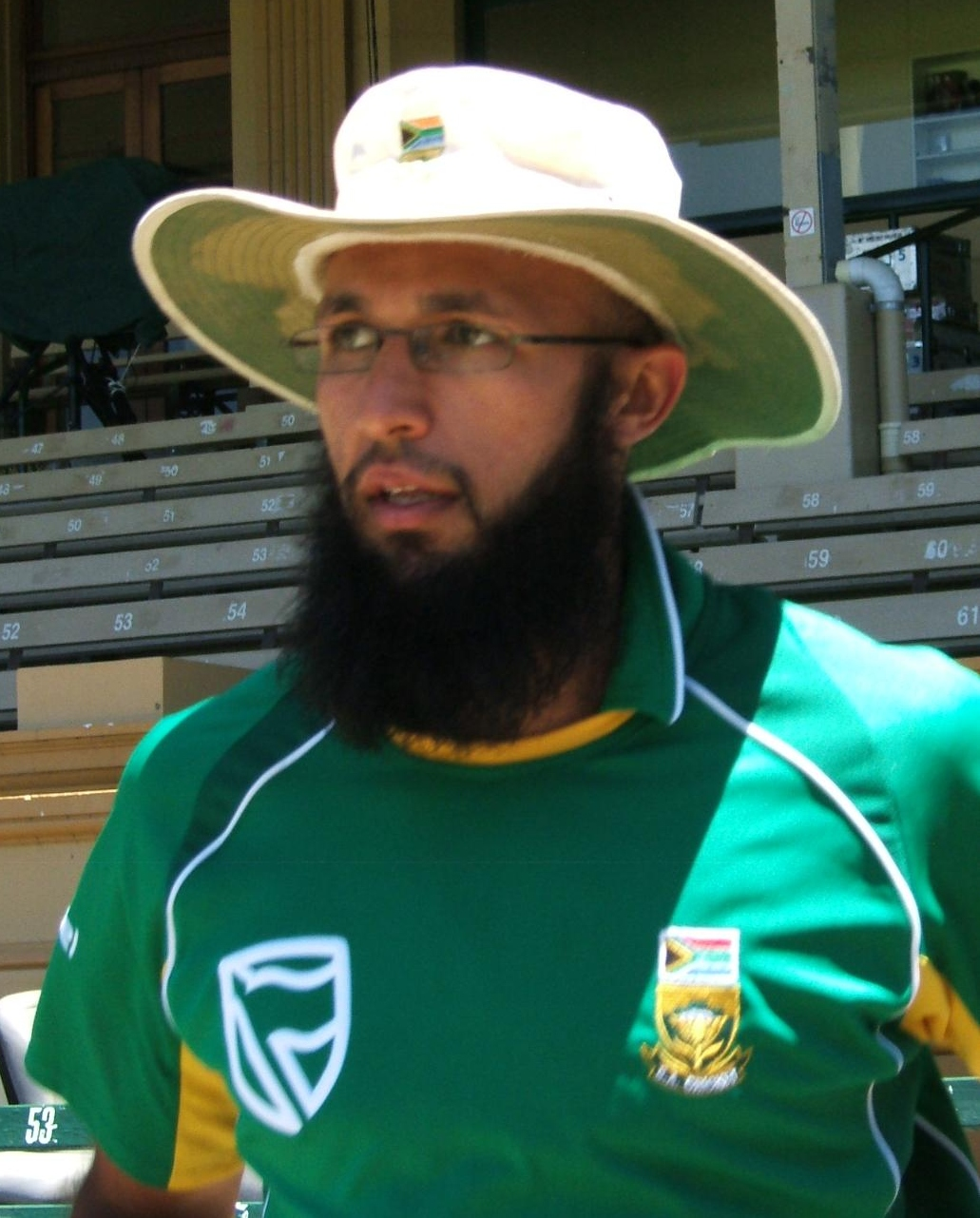
Hashim Amla has scored two centuries for Punjab Kings.

Kings XI Punjab cricketers
General					Batting								Bowling					Fielding	
Name	Nationality (Note: The information in the nationality column is according to Cricinfo. This information may not necessarily reflect the player's birthplace or citizenship.)	First	Last	Mat	Inn	NO	Runs	HS	100 (Note: A century made is not listed as an additional half century.)	50	Avg	SR	Balls	Wkt	BBI	ER	Ave	Ca	St
Varun Aaron	India	2017	2017	6	2	1	4	4	0	0	4.00	40.00	120	7	2/3	8.15	23.28	0	0
Kyle Abbott	South Africa	2016	2016	5	3	2	13	12*	0	0	13.00	162.50	96	2	1/38	11.06	88.50	0	0
Yusuf Abdullah	South Africa	2009	2010	11	1	1	0	0*	0	0	–	0.00	209	15	4/31	8.81	20.46	0	0
Love Ablish	India	2010	2011	3	1	1	0	0*	0	0	–	0.00	42	3	2/17	10.71	25.00	0	0
Akshdeep Nath	India	2018	2018	1	1	0	9	9	0	0	9.00	69.23	0	–	–	–	–	1	0
Mayank Agarwal †	India	2018	2022	60	59	2	1513	106	1	9	26.54	141.00	0	–	–	–	–	30	0
Fabian Allen	West Indies	2021	2021	4	3	2	6	6	0	0	6.00	50.00	66	1	1/22	8.18	90.00	2	0
Hashim Amla	South Africa	2016	2017	16	16	3	577	104*	2	3	44.38	141.76	0	-	-	-	-	0	0
Anureet Singh	India	2014	2017	22	8	3	49	16	0	0	9.80	92.45	457	20	3/12	8.82	33.60	6	0
Vaibhav Arora	India	2022	2022	5	4	2	5	2*	0	0	2.50	38.46	107	3	2/21	9.19	35.60	1	0
Arshdeep Singh §	India	2019	2026	96	15	9	32	10*	0	0	5.33	68.08	2032	111	5/32	9.18	28.02	20	0
Priyansh Arya §	India	2025	2026	30	30	0	839	103	1	5	27.96	191.99	0	–	–	–	–	10	0
Murugan Ashwin	India	2019	2021	22	6	2	22	9	0	0	5.50	66.66	459	16	3/21	7.67	36.68	7	0
Ravichandran Ashwin †	India	2018	2019	28	15	2	144	45	0	0	11.07	145.45	634	25	3/23	7.66	32.40	9	0
Parvinder Awana	India	2012	2014	38	8	5	5	4*	0	0	1.66	31.25	861	48	4/30	8.29	24.81	7	0
Azhar Mahmood	Pakistan	2012	2013	22	20	2	382	80	0	2	21.22	129.05	519	29	3/20	7.61	22.72	8	0
Azmatullah Omarzai	Afghanistan	2025	2026	12	7	1	109	38	0	0	18.16	160.29	228	11	2/33	10.05	34.72	1	0
George Bailey †	Australia	2014	2015	35	33	10	581	61*	0	2	25.26	132.95	0	–	–	–	–	12	0
Jonny Bairstow ‡	England	2022	2024	22	22	1	551	108*	1	2	26.23	148.91	0	–	–	–	–	10	0
Lakshmipathy Balaji	India	2014	2014	9	2	1	1	1*	0	0	1.00	33.33	204	12	4/13	8.79	24.91	0	0
Adrian Barath	West Indies	2010	2010	3	3	1	42	33	0	0	21.00	100.00	0	–	–	–	–	0	0
Xavier Bartlett §	Australia	2025	2026	13	4	2	40	18*	0	0	20.00	142.85	261	7	2/9	11.12	69.14	15	0
Raj Bawa	India	2022	2022	2	2	0	11	11	0	0	5.50	78.57	0	–	–	–	–	0	0
Farhaan Behardien	South Africa	2016	2016	3	3	1	14	9*	0	0	7.00	107.69	0	–	–	–	–	1	0
Bhargav Bhatt	India	2011	2013	17	2	1	6	6*	0	0	6.00	85.71	296	12	4/22	8.04	33.08	1	0
Bipul Sharma	India	2010	2013	15	9	5	104	35*	0	0	26.00	144.44	202	8	2/32	8.07	34.00	4	0
Manvinder Bisla	India	2010	2010	10	10	0	218	75	0	1	21.80	122.47	0	–	–	–	–	4	0
Ravi Bopara	England	2009	2010	15	14	1	386	84	0	3	29.69	115.91	86	5	3/31	9.20	26.40	5	0
Ranadeb Bose	India	2009	2009	1	0	0	0	-	0	0	-	0	12	0	–	12.00	–	0	0
KC Cariappa	India	2016	2017	9	4	1	15	12*	0	0	5.00	83.33	192	07	2/16	8.93	40.85	3	0
Yuzvendra Chahal §	India	2025	2026	28	0	0	-	-	0	0	-	-	516	28	4/28	9.47	29.10	5	0
Rahul Chahar	India	2022	2024	36	13	4	98	25*	0	0	10.88	106.52	764	32	3/23	8.04	32.00	12	0
Piyush Chawla	India	2008	2013	87	52	21	401	24*	0	0	12.93	112.95	1784	84	4/17	7.52	26.63	22	0
Siddharth Chitnis	India	2011	2012	7	5	1	75	38	0	0	18.75	105.63	0	–	–	–	–	1	0
Cooper Connolly§	Australia	2026	2026	14	13	2	491	107*	1	2	44.64	163.12	0	–	–	–	–	4	0
Sheldon Cottrell	West Indies	2020	2020	6	1	-	-	-	0	0	-	-	120	6	2/17	8.80	29.33	0	0
Sam Curran †	England	2019	2024	36	33	9	641	63*	0	4	26.70	134.38	731	36	4/11	10.07	34.11	14	0
Pankaj Dharmani ‡	India	2008	2008	1	0	0	-	-	0	0	-	-	0	-	-	-	-	0	0
Rishi Dhawan	India	2014	2024	33	20	12	189	25*	0	0	23.62	113.85	572	23	2/14	8.20	34.00	6	0
Shikhar Dhawan †	India	2022	2024	30	30	4	985	99*	0	7	37.88	130.11	0	–	–	–	–	17	0
Paras Dogra	India	2012	2012	3	3	1	15	6	0	0	7.50	62.50	0	–	–	–	–	1	0
Pravin Dubey	India	2025	2025	1	-	-	-	-	0	0	-	-	12	1	1/20	10.00	20.00	0	0
Ben Dwarshuis	Australia	2026	2026	1	-	-	-	-	0	0	-	-	24	1	1/51	12.75	51.00	1	0
Nathan Ellis	Australia	2021	2024	16	5	1	19	12	0	0	4.75	76.00	354	18	4/30	8.61	28.22	2	0
James Faulkner	Australia	2012	2012	2	20	12	189	25*	0	0	23.62	113.85	48	3	2/41	9.00	24.00	1	0
Lockie Ferguson §	New Zealand	2025	2026	7	1	1	4	4*	0	0	-	400.00	134	6	2/37	10.97	40.83	1	0
Aaron Finch	Australia	2018	2018	10	9	1	134	46	0	0	16.75	134.00	0	–	–	–	–	4	0
Gagandeep Singh	India	2008	2008	4	0	0	-	-	0	0	-	-	84	03	1/33	10.07	47.00	0	0
Chris Gayle	West Indies	2018	2021	41	41	4	1339	104*	1	10	36.18	143.20	5	0	-	6.00	-	6	0
Adam Gilchrist † ‡	Australia	2011	2013	34	34	3	849	106	1	4	27.38	127.28	1	1	1/0	-	-	26	3
Karan Goel	India	2008	2010	22	17	2	218	38	0	0	14.53	94.37	66	0	0/7	8.45	–	9	0
Manpreet Gony	India	2013	2013	8	5	1	45	42	0	0	11.25	180.00	168	7	2/24	9.14	36.57	0	0
Krishnappa Gowtham	India	2020	2020	2	2	1	42	22*	0	0	42.00	155.55	48	1	1/45	10.50	84.00	0	0
Martin Guptill	New Zealand	2017	2017	7	7	1	132	50*	0	1	22.00	150.00	0	–	–	–	–	6	0
Gurkeerat Mann	India	2012	2017	30	24	3	342	51	0	1	16.28	125.73	78	5	2/15	7.46	19.40	13	1
Gurnoor Brar	India	2023	2023	1	0	0	-	-	0	0	-	-	18	0	-	14.00	-	0	0
Harmeet Singh	India	2012	2013	10	3	1	18	14	0	0	9.00	163.63	202	12	3/24	8.25	23.16	2	0
Harpreet Brar §	India	2019	2026	51	27	15	249	29	0	0	20.75	120.87	859	37	4/30	7.99	30.94	15	0
Harpreet Singh	India	2023	2024	5	5	0	103	41	0	0	20.60	110.75	0	–	–	–	–	1	0
Ryan Harris	Australia	2011	2013	21	11	4	51	17	0	0	7.28	92.72	462	25	4/34	7.58	23.36	10	0
Beuran Hendricks	South Africa	2014	2015	7	3	2	1	1*	0	0	1.00	33.33	150	9	3/36	9.40	26.11	3	0
Moises Henriques	Australia	2021	2021	5	4	2	31	14	0	0	15.50	96.87	60	4	3/12	4.50	11.25	1	0
Matt Henry	New Zealand	2017	2017	2	0	0	-	-	0	0	-	-	30	1	1/31	14.20	71.00	0	0
Deepak Hooda	India	2020	2021	19	16	5	261	64	0	2	23.72	134.53	102	2	1/15	8.52	72.50	10	0
James Hopes	Australia	2008	2008	11	11	0	221	71	0	2	20.09	149.32	168	7	2/2	9.85	39.42	3	0
David Hussey †	Australia	2011	2013	36	34	6	695	68*	0	2	24.82	120.45	138	4	2/2	8.34	48.00	14	0
Josh Inglis	Australia	2025	2025	11	11	2	278	73	0	1	30.88	162.57	0	–	–	–	–	9	1
Shreyas Iyer † §	India	2025	2026	31	30	9	1102	101*	1	11	52.47	172.18	0	–	–	–	–	15	0
Kyle Jamieson	New Zealand	2025	2025	4	2	2	-	0*	0	0	-	-	90	5	3/48	9.80	29.40	0	0
Marco Jansen §	South Africa	2025	2026	27	13	5	126	34*	0	0	15.75	116.66	567	25	3/17	9.70	36.68	15	0
Mahela Jayawardene †	Sri Lanka	2008	2010	36	35	12	837	110*	1	2	36.39	140.91	0	–	–	–	–	16	0
Mitchell Johnson	Australia	2014	2016	26	19	10	92	16*	0	0	10.22	92.00	602	28	2/19	8.83	31.64	5	0
Chris Jordan	England	2020	2021	13	7	2	61	30	0	0	12.20	117.30	261	13	3/17	9.19	30.76	5	0
Mohammad Kaif	India	2010	2010	4	3	0	28	14	0	0	9.33	93.33	0	–	–	–	–	2	0
Karanveer Singh	India	2014	2015	14	5	4	29	17*	0	0	29.00	69.04	296	18	4/15	8.87	24.33	6	0
Dinesh Karthik ‡	India	2011	2011	14	13	2	282	69	0	1	25.63	128.18	0	–	–	–	–	7	0
Murali Kartik	India	2014	2014	2	0	0	-	-	0	0	-	-	48	1	1/51	11.37	91.00	0	0
Simon Katich	Australia	2008	2009	11	11	1	241	75	0	2	24.10	129.57	0	–	–	–	–	2	0
Uday Kaul ‡	India	2008	2008	5	1	1	0	0*	0	0	–	0.00	0	–	–	–	–	2	0
Vidwath Kaverappa	India	2024	2024	1	0	0	-	-	0	0	-	-	24	2	2/36	9.00	18.00	0	0
Sarfaraz Khan	India	2019	2021	15	10	2	213	67	0	1	26.62	121.02	6	0	–	18.00	–	4	0
Taruwar Kohli	India	2009	2009	2	2	1	1	1	0	0	1.00	25.00	0	–	–	–	–	0	0
Praveen Kumar	India	2011	2013	44	21	9	109	24	0	0	9.08	109.00	992	31	2/10	6.96	37.16	4	0
Brett Lee	Australia	2008	2010	13	10	6	56	16*	0	0	14.00	100.00	303	9	3/15	7.36	41.33	6	0
Liam Livingstone	England	2022	2024	30	30	5	827	94	0	6	33.08	169.12	252	11	3/27	9.04	34.54	11	0
Ryan McLaren	South Africa	2011	2011	6	4	1	90	51*	0	1	30.00	93.75	108	5	2/33	9.88	35.60	2	0
Dawid Malan	England	2021	2021	1	1	0	26	26	0	0	26.00	100.00	0	–	–	–	–	1	0
Vikramjeet Malik	India	2009	2011	9	1	0	6	6	0	0	6.00	120.00	127	3	1/12	8.17	57.66	1	0
Mandeep Singh	India	2011	2021	62	58	11	1073	77*	0	4	22.82	122.62	12	0	-	13.00	-	19	0
Prerak Mankad	India	2022	2022	1	1	1	4	4*	0	0	-	400.00	0	–	–	–	–	1	0
Aiden Markram	South Africa	2021	2021	6	6	1	146	42	0	0	29.20	122.68	24	0	-	5.75	-	3	0
Shaun Marsh	Australia	2008	2017	71	69	7	2477	115	1	20	39.95	132.74	0	–	–	–	–	26	0
Dimitri Mascarenhas	England	2012	2013	5	4	1	19	9	0	0	6.33	90.47	120	7	5/25	6.50	18.57	1	0
Glenn Maxwell †	Australia	2014	2025	77	73	9	1431	95	0	6	22.35	154.53	540	18	2/15	8.51	42.55	33	0
Riley Meredith	Australia	2021	2021	5	1	1	-	0*	0	0	-	-	102	4	1/29	9.94	42.25	0	0
David Miller †	South Africa	2012	2019	84	82	26	1974	101*	1	9	35.25	139.40	0	–	–	–	–	53	0
Mohammed Shami	India	2019	2021	42	9	6	16	9*	0	0	5.33	72.72	962	58	3/15	8.25	22.82	8	0
Mohit Rathee	India	2023	2023	1	1	1	1	1*	0	0	-	50.00	12	0	-	14.50	-	0	0
Eoin Morgan	England	2017	2017	4	4	0	65	26	0	0	16.25	104.83	0	–	–	–	–	3	0
Wilkin Mota	India	2008	2009	12	8	2	56	25	0	0	9.33	74.66	72	4	1/6	8.08	24.25	5	0
Mujeeb Ur Rahman	Afghanistan	2018	2020	18	6	3	11	10*	0	0	3.66	78.57	410	17	3/27	8.23	33.11	2	0
Musheer Khan §	India	2025	2025	1	1	0	-	-	0	0	-	-	12	1	1/27	13.50	27.00	0	0
Mitch Owen §	Australia	2025	2025	1	1	0	-	-	0	0	-	-	-	-	-	-	-	2	0
Nikhil Naik ‡	India	2016	2016	2	2	0	23	22	0	0	11.50	74.19	0	–	–	–	–	0	0
Karun Nair	India	2018	2020	18	16	1	332	54	0	2	21.46	133.60	0	–	–	–	–	10	0
T Natarajan	India	2017	2017	6	0	0	-	-	0	0	-	-	76	2	1/26	9.07	57.50	0	0
Abhishek Nayar	India	2011	2012	14	13	3	106	24	0	0	10.60	91.37	67	2	1/22	9.94	55.50	2	0
James Neesham	New Zealand	2020	2020	5	3	1	19	10*	0	0	9.50	105.55	90	2	1/17	9.86	74.00	1	0
Michael Neser	Australia	2013	2013	1	0	0	-	-	0	0	-	-	24	0	-	15.50	-	0	0
Axar Patel	India	2014	2018	73	53	16	740	44	0	0	20.00	130.05	1527	69	4/21	7.41	27.36	25	0
Harshal Patel	India	2024	2024	14	4	1	13	12	0	0	4.33	68.42	294	24	3/15	9.73	19.87	5	0
Irfan Pathan	India	2008	2010	42	35	11	603	60	0	1	25.12	131.08	898	47	3/24	7.79	24.80	12	0
Thisara Perera	Sri Lanka	2014	2015	7	6	1	63	35*	0	0	12.60	126.00	120	8	2/15	8.30	20.75	1	0
Luke Pomersbach	Australia	2008	2013	12	12	5	251	79*	0	1	35.86	121.26	0	–	–	–	–	2	0
Nicholas Pooran ‡	West Indies	2019	2021	33	31	4	606	77	0	2	22.44	154.98	0	–	–	–	–	11	0
Ishan Porel	India	2021	2021	1	0	0	-	-	0	0	-	-	24	1	1/39	9.75	39.00	0	0
Ramesh Powar	India	2008	2012	22	7	5	56	28*	0	0	28.00	109.80	354	11	2/11	7.03	37.72	5	0
Prabhsimran Singh ‡ §	India	2019	2026	65	64	1	1815	103	1	13	28.80	156.33	0	–	–	–	–	13	2
Cheteshwar Pujara	India	2014	2014	6	6	1	125	40*	0	0	25.00	100.80	0	–	–	–	–	0	0
Kagiso Rabada	South Africa	2022	2024	30	13	6	68	25	0	0	9.71	115.25	678	41	4/33	8.93	24.63	7	0
KL Rahul †‡	India	2018	2021	55	55	10	2548	132*	2	23	56.62	139.76	0	–	–	–	–	38	1
Bhanuka Rajapaksa	Sri Lanka	2022	2023	13	13	1	277	50	0	1	23.08	145.02	0	–	–	–	–	4	0
Ankit Rajpoot	India	2018	2019	12	3	0	11	8	0	0	3.66	61.11	253	14	5/14	8.89	26.78	3	0
Adil Rashid	England	2021	2021	1	0	0	-	-	0	0	-	-	18	0	-	11.66	-	0	0
Ravi Bishnoi	India	2020	2021	23	4	2	8	6*	0	0	4.00	50.00	522	24	3/24	6.96	25.25	4	0
Jhye Richardson	Australia	2021	2021	3	2	0	15	15	0	0	7.50	62.50	66	3	2/41	10.63	39.00	1	0
Nathan Rimmington	Australia	2011	2011	1	1	1	1	1*	0	0	-	100.00	18	0	–	6.33	–	0	0
Rilee Rossouw	South Africa	2024	2024	8	8	0	211	61	0	1	26.37	181.89	0	–	–	–	–	4	0
Wriddhiman Saha ‡	India	2014	2017	62	54	6	1190	115*	1	5	24.79	130.48	0	–	–	–	–	39	15
Pardeep Sahu	India	2016	2016	5	2	1	19	18*	0	0	19.00	146.15	105	3	2/18	8.34	48.66	0	0
Nitin Saini ‡	India	2012	2012	10	10	0	140	50	0	1	14.00	99.29	0	–	–	–	–	11	2
Sandeep Sharma	India	2013	2022	61	13	12	26	7	0	0	26.00	74.28	1345	73	4/20	7.76	23.83	10	0
Kumar Sangakkara † ‡	Sri Lanka	2008	2010	37	34	2	1009	94	0	8	31.53	129.53	0	–	–	–	–	18	7
Ramnaresh Sarwan	West Indies	2008	2008	4	4	0	73	31	0	0	18.25	97.33	0	–	–	–	–	1	0
Rajagopal Sathish	India	2013	2013	9	8	3	109	27*	0	0	21.80	141.55	24	0	–	12.75	–	0	0
Jalaj Saxena	India	2021	2021	1	0	0	-	-	0	0	-	-	18	0	-	9.00	-	0	0
Virender Sehwag †	India	2014	2015	30	30	0	660	122	1	2	22.00	133.87	24	0	–	9.00	–	5	0
Shahrukh Khan	India	2021	2023	33	31	10	426	47	0	0	20.28	134.81	0	–	–	–	–	14	0
Ashutosh Sharma	India	2024	2024	11	9	2	189	61	0	1	27.00	167.25	0	–	–	–	–	2	0
Ishant Sharma	India	2017	2017	6	3	1	8	5*	0	0	4.00	66.66	108	0	–	9.94	–	0	0
Jitesh Sharma ‡	India	2022	2024	40	36	4	730	49*	0	0	22.81	151.13	0	–	–	–	–	25	4
Mohit Sharma	India	2016	2018	37	17	6	93	15	0	0	8.45	104.49	743	33	3/23	9.19	34.51	0	0
Shashank Singh §	India	2024	2026	43	37	16	836	68*	0	6	39.80	162.96	78	5	2/20	9.23	24.00	15	0
Shivam Sharma	India	2014	2015	5	2	1	5	4	0	0	5.00	166.66	114	4	2/26	8.68	41.25	1	0
Shivam Singh	India	2024	2024	1	1	1	2	2*	0	0	-	66.66	0	–	–	–	–	2	0
Matthew Short	Australia	2023	2023	6	6	0	117	36	0	0	19.50	127.17	24	0	–	6.25	–	3	0
Sikandar Raza	Zimbabwe	2023	2024	9	9	2	182	57	0	1	26.00	133.82	84	3	1/19	10.07	47.00	5	0
VRV Singh	India	2008	2010	19	2	0	4	4	0	0	2.00	133.33	360	12	3/29	9.03	45.16	3	0
Odean Smith	West Indies	2022	2022	6	6	3	51	25*	0	0	17.00	115.90	90	6	4/30	11.86	29.66	2	0
Reetinder Sodhi	India	2010	2010	3	1	1	4	4*	0	0	-	200.00	0	–	–	–	–	2	0
Sunny Sohal	United States	2008	2010	11	10	0	119	43	0	0	11.90	117.82	0	–	–	–	–	2	0
Barinder Sran	India	2018	2018	6	4	3	3	2	0	0	3.00	42.85	132	4	2/50	10.40	57.25	2	0
S Sreesanth	India	2008	2010	28	8	7	32	15*	0	0	32.00	76.19	559	28	3/29	8.81	29.32	2	0
Shalabh Srivastava	India	2010	2011	14	4	3	5	3*	0	0	5.00	100.00	282	14	2/20	9.38	31.50	3	0
Tanmay Srivastava	India	2008	2009	7	3	2	8	7	0	0	8.00	72.73	0	–	–	–	–	2	0
Marcus Stoinis §	Australia	2016	2026	45	35	12	638	62*	0	2	27.73	154.10	399	16	4/15	10.48	43.56	7	0
Sunny Singh	India	2011	2011	6	5	1	43	20	0	0	10.75	138.70	0	–	–	–	–	1	0
Suryansh Shedge §	India	2025	2026	12	10	3	165	57	0	1	23.57	163.36	18	0	–	13.33	–	4	0
Swapnil Singh	India	2016	2017	5	3	0	12	10	0	0	4.00	60.00	60	1	1/14	9.00	90.00	1	0
Atharva Taide	India	2023	2024	9	9	0	247	66	0	2	27.44	147.02	1	0	–	24.00	–	5	0
Rahul Tewatia	India	2017	2017	3	2	1	19	15*	0	0	19.00	172.72	54	3	2/18	5.44	16.33	0	0
Shardul Thakur	India	2015	2015	1	1	1	7	7*	0	0	-	116.66	18	1	1/38	12.66	38.00	0	0
Yash Thakur §	India	2025	2026	3	0	0	-	-	0	0	-	-	63	3	2/55	12.76	79.00	0	0
Rusty Theron	United States	2010	2010	7	2	0	2	2	0	0	1.00	40.00	144	6	2/17	7.79	31.16	1	0
Manoj Tiwary	India	2018	2018	5	4	1	47	35	0	0	15.66	106.81	6	0	–	10.00	–	4	0
Andrew Tye	Australia	2018	2019	20	9	3	32	14	0	0	5.33	80.00	681	27	4/16	8.73	25.22	7	0
Paul Valthaty	India	2011	2013	21	21	1	499	120*	1	2	24.95	122.90	151	7	4/29	8.14	29.28	3	0
Murali Vijay †	India	2015	2016	25	25	1	704	89	0	5	29.33	118.91	30	0	–	7.20	–	6	0
Hardus Viljoen	South Africa	2019	2019	6	3	1	3	2*	0	0	1.50	42.85	138	7	2/39	9.65	31.71	0	0
Manan Vohra	India	2013	2017	50	46	2	1106	95	0	4	25.13	134.06	0	–	–	–	–	15	0
Vijaykumar Vyshak §	India	2025	2026	15	2	2	2	1*	0	0	-	50.00	288	13	3/34	10.64	39.30	2	0
Nehal Wadhera §	India	2025	2026	24	21	3	434	70	0	2	24.11	140.00	5	–	–	10.80	–	8	0
Yuvraj Singh †	India	2008	2018	51	48	5	959	58*	0	3	22.50	127.87	324	14	3/13	7.41	28.57	15	0

== Captains ==
Punjab Kings captains
No.	Name	Nat.	First	Last	Mat	Won	Lost	No Result	Win%
1	Yuvraj Singh	(India)	2008	2009	29	17	12	0	58.62
2	Kumar Sangakkara	(Sri Lanka)	2010	2010	13	4	9	0	30.77
3	Mahela Jayawardene	(Sri Lanka)	2010	2010	1	0	1	0	0.00
4	Adam Gilchrist	(Australia)	2011	2013	34	17	17	0	50.00
5	David Hussey	(Australia)	2012	2013	12	6	6	0	50.00
6	George Bailey	(Australia)	2014	2015	35	18	17	0	51.42
7	Virender Sehwag	(India)	2015	2015	1	0	0	1	75.00
8	David Miller	(South Africa)	2016	2016	6	1	5	0	16.66
9	Murali Vijay	(India)	2016	2016	8	3	5	0	37.50
10	Glenn Maxwell	(Australia)	2017	2017	14	7	7	0	50.00
11	Ravichandran Ashwin	(India)	2018	2019	28	12	16	0	42.85
12	KL Rahul	(India)	2020	2021	28	12	16	0	42.85
13	Mayank Agarwal	(India)	2022	2022	14	7	7	0	50.00
14	Shikhar Dhawan	(India)	2023	2024	17	6	11	0	35.29
15	Sam Curran	(England)	2023	2024	11	5	6	0	45.45
16	Jitesh Sharma	(India)	2024	2024	1	0	1	0	00.00
17	Shreyas Iyer	(India)	2025	present	14	9	4	1	69.23
Total					256	118	137	1	46.09

== See also ==
- List of Indian Premier League centuries
- List of Indian Premier League records and statistics
