= Karan Mahajan (cricketer) =

Indian cricketer (born 1997)

Personal information
- Full name: Karan R. Mahajan
- Born: 2 January 1997 (age 29); Kangra, Himachal Pradesh, India
- Source: ESPNcricinfo, 10 January 2016

Karan Mahajan (born 2 January 1997) is an Indian cricketer who plays for Railways. He made his Twenty20 debut on 2 January 2016 in the 2015–16 Syed Mushtaq Ali Trophy.
