= Satrajit Lahiri =

Indian cricketer (born 1971)

Personal information
- Born: 26 February 1971 (age 55); Murshidabad, West Bengal
- Source: Cricinfo, 10 January 2021

Satrajit Lahiri (born 26 February 1971) is an Indian former cricketer. He played in twelve first-class and eight List A matches for Tripura from 1990 to 1998. He is now an umpire, standing in a match in the 2020–21 Syed Mushtaq Ali Trophy.

== See also ==
- List of Tripura cricketers
