= Yash Nahar =

Indian cricketer (born 1994)

Personal information
- Full name: Yash J Nahar
- Born: 10 October 1994 (age 32); Pune, Maharashtra, India
- Batting: Right handed
- Bowling: Right arm offbreak
- Role: Opening batter

Domestic team information
- Years: Team
- 2019–present: Maharashtra
- Source: Cricinfo, 21 February 2019

Yash Nahar (born 10 October 1994) is an Indian cricketer. A right handed opening batter, he represents Maharashtra in domestic cricket.

== Career ==
Nahar made his Twenty20 debut for Maharashtra in the 2018–19 Syed Mushtaq Ali Trophy on 21 February 2019. He made his List A debut on 21 February 2021, for Maharashtra in the 2020–21 Vijay Hazare Trophy. He made his first-class debut on 17 February 2022, for Maharashtra in the 2021–22 Ranji Trophy.
