= Jayaprakash Manikandan =

Indian cricketer (born 1998)

Personal information
- Born: 22 November 1998 (age 27); Puducherry, India
- Source: ESPNcricinfo, 17 January 2021

Jayaprakash Manikandan (born 22 November 1998) is an Indian cricketer. He made his Twenty20 debut on 17 January 2021, for Puducherry in the 2020–21 Syed Mushtaq Ali Trophy.
