= Dadoji Kondadev Stadium =

Stadium in Maharashtra, India

Coordinates: 19°11′32.81″N 72°58′47.13″E

Dadoji Konddev Stadium
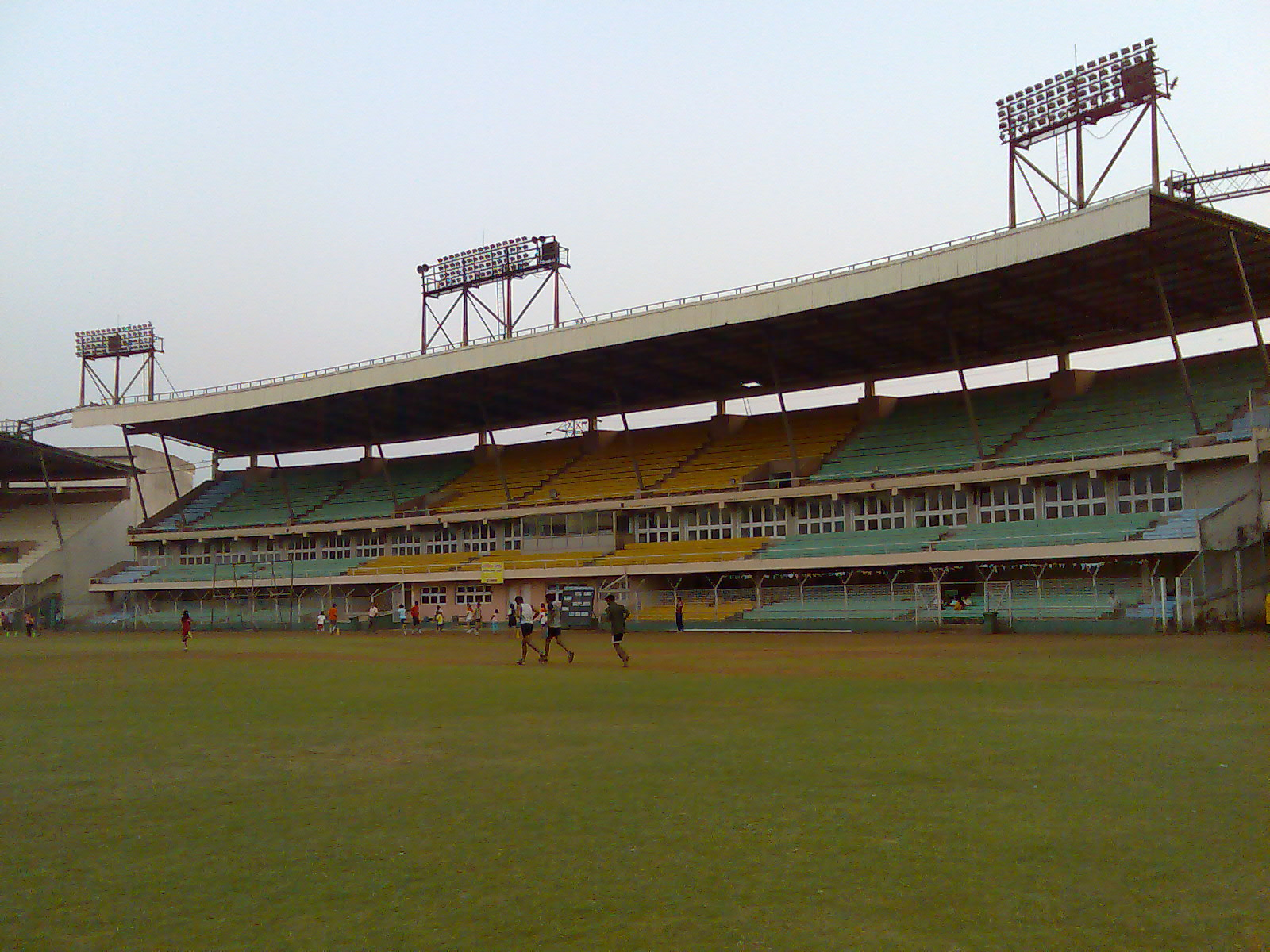
- View of the Dadoji Kondadev Stadium, Thane
- Interactive map of Dadoji Konddev Stadium
- Former names: SR Bhosle Krida Sankul Stadium
- Location: Fire Brigade Road, Thane, Maharashtra, India
- Owner: TMC
- Operator: TMC
- Capacity: 20,000
- Surface: Grass and Mud

Construction
- Built: 1982

The Dadoji Konddev Stadium, sometimes called SR Bhosle Krida Sankul Stadium, is a sports stadium in Thane, Maharashtra, India. It is named after Dadoji Konddev and is currently used mostly for training.

Its main ground has been built for cricket with an in-built six lane running track for athletes. The complex also includes 5 badminton courts, a gym, a table tennis hall, 2 squash courts, a billiards room, rami room, hall, bar room, and a canteen.

Athletics and badminton coaching by the Thane Municipal Corporation's Badminton Association has also been conducted here since 1987.

The stadium also hosts a number of private athletics coaching classes as well like Track and Field Masters Club, Achievers Club, Seven Stars. The spectator capacity is 20,000.

Dadoji Stadium is only stadium in Thane with a 400-meter running track and many of the athletics events like the Mayor's Cup where 60+ schools and 2000 athletes typically participate and Arya Krida Mandal events are conducted here.

The ground also hosts a number of annual sports events of various schools in Thane and acts as a venue for cultural events.

== WPL auction ==
The players' auction for the inaugural Women's Premier League (WPL) season was held in this stadium.
