= Akash Sudan =

Indian cricketer (born 1993)

Personal information
- Full name: Akash Sudan
- Born: 7 May 1993 (age 33)
- Batting: Left-handed
- Bowling: Right arm medium

Domestic team information
- Years: Team
- 2017–18: Delhi
- Source: ESPNcricinfo, 25 November 2017

Akash Sudan (born 7 May 1993) is an Indian cricketer. He made his first-class debut for Delhi in the 2017–18 Ranji Trophy, on 25 November 2017.
