= Abhimanyu Rana =

Indian cricketer (born 1991)

Personal information
- Born: 21 September 1991 (age 35); Delhi, India
- Source: ESPNcricinfo, 1 November 2015

Abhimanyu Rana (born 21 September 1991) is an Indian cricketer who plays for Himachal Pradesh. He made his T-20 debut in Syed Mushtaq Ali trophy on 14th March, 2010 at the age of 18 and his List A debut on 21 February 2021, for Himachal Pradesh in the 2020–21 Vijay Hazare Trophy. He was the member of Vijay hazare trophy champion Himachal Pradesh cricket team during the season 2021-22 and also member of Syed Mushtaq Ali championship runner up team during 2022–23. Also, he is a gazetted officer in CAG.
