= Vinay Choudhary =

Indian cricketer (born 1993)

Personal information
- Born: 4 September 1993 (age 33); Amritsar, Punjab, India
- Batting: Left-handed
- Bowling: Slow left arm orthodox

Domestic team information
- Years: Team
- 2013–14: Punjab
- Source: ESPNcricinfo, 9 October 2016

Vinay Choudhary (born 4 September 1993) is an Indian cricketer. He made his first-class debut for Punjab in the 2013–14 Ranji Trophy on 14 December 2013.
