= Samarpit Joshi =

Indian cricketer (born 1999)

Personal information
- Born: 19 September 1999 (age 27); Udaipur, Rajasthan, India
- Batting: Right-handed
- Role: Wicketkeeper
- Source: Cricinfo, 1 March 2021

Samarpit Joshi (born 19 September 1999) is an Indian cricketer. He made his List A debut on 1 March 2021, for Rajasthan in the 2020–21 Vijay Hazare Trophy. He made his first-class debut on 3 March 2022, for Rajasthan in the 2021–22 Ranji Trophy.
