= Hardeep Singh (Uttar Pradesh cricketer) =

Indian cricketer (born 1995)

Personal information
- Born: 23 June 1995 (age 31); Meerut, Uttar Pradesh, India
- Batting: Right-handed
- Bowling: Right arm off break
- Source: ESPNcricinfo, 9 November 2019

Hardeep Singh (born 23 June 1995) is an Indian cricketer. He made his Twenty20 debut on 9 November 2019, for Uttar Pradesh in the 2019–20 Syed Mushtaq Ali Trophy.
