= Tushar Gill =

Indian cricketer (born 1995)

Personal information
- Full name: Tushar Gill
- Born: 17 January 1995 (age 31)
- Source: Cricinfo, 17 November 2019

Tushar Gill (born 17 January 1995) is an Indian cricketer. He made his Twenty20 debut on 17 November 2019, for Vidarbha in the 2019–20 Syed Mushtaq Ali Trophy.
