= Gurvinder Singh (cricketer) =

Indian cricketer (born 1983)

Personal information
- Born: 12 June 1983 (age 43); Sirmour, Himachal Pradesh, India
- Source: ESPNcricinfo, 15 October 2016

Gurvinder Singh (born 12 June 1983) is an Indian cricketer. He made his first-class debut for Himachal Pradesh in the 2010–11 Ranji Trophy on 24 November 2010.

He was the leading wicket-taker for Himachal Pradesh in the 2017–18 Ranji Trophy, with 20 dismissals in six matches.
