= Ponnan Rahul =

Indian cricketer (born 1992)

Personal information
- Born: 4 February 1992 (age 34); Alappuzha, Kerala, India
- Batting: Left-handed
- Bowling: Right-arm offbreak
- Role: Opening batter

Domestic team information
- Years: Team
- 2017–present: Kerala

Career statistics
Competition	FC	List A	T20
Matches	13	6	2
Runs scored	526	124	11
Batting average	22.86	31.00	5.50
100s/50s	1/3	0/10	0/0
Top score	127	36	7
Catches/stumpings	13/0	4/0	1/0
- Source: Cricinfo, 28 December 2022

Ponnan Rahul (born 4 February 1992) is an Indian cricketer who represents Kerala in domestic cricket. He is a left-handed top order batsman and occasional right-arm off-spinner.

== Domestic career ==
After representing Kerala in U-22 and U-25 levels, Rahul made his first-class debut for Kerala in the 2017–18 Ranji Trophy on 6 October 2017 against Jharkhand. He played 6 matches in the 2018–19 Ranji Trophy, scoring 370 runs and finished the tournament as Kerala's fourth highest run-scorer. He also scored his maiden first-class century in the season. However, he scored just 137 runs from five matches in the next Ranji season with a highest score of 97.

He made his List A debut on 29 September 2019, for Kerala in the 2019–20 Vijay Hazare Trophy against Hyderabad. He made his Twenty20 debut on 8 November 2019, for Kerala in the 2019–20 Syed Mushtaq Ali Trophy against Tamil Nadu.

Rahul made a career-best score of 147 against Meghalaya in the 2021-22 Ranji Trophy.

== Personal life ==
Rahul narrowly survived a motorcycle crash in 2017.
