= Hiten Dalal =

Indian cricketer (born 1994)

Personal information
- Born: 25 September 1994 (age 32); Delhi, India
- Batting: Right-handed
- Bowling: Right-arm leg-break
- Role: Batsman

Domestic team information
- Years: Team
- 2017/18–present: Delhi
- Source: ESPNcricinfo, 5 February 2018

Hiten Dalal (born 25 September 1994) is an Indian cricketer. He made his List A debut for Delhi in the 2017–18 Vijay Hazare Trophy on 5 February 2018. He made his first-class debut for Delhi in the 2018–19 Ranji Trophy on 12 November 2018. He was the leading run-scorer for Delhi in the tournament, with 376 runs in seven matches. He made his Twenty20 debut for Delhi in the 2018–19 Syed Mushtaq Ali Trophy on 21 February 2019.
