= Premraj Rajavelu =

Indian cricketer (born 1991)

Personal information
- Born: 11 September 1991 (age 33); Puducherry, India
- Batting: Right-handed
- Role: Batter
- Source: Cricinfo, 19 January 2021

Premraj Rajavelu (born 11 September 1991) is an Indian cricketer. He made his Twenty20 debut on 19 January 2021, for Puducherry in the 2020–21 Syed Mushtaq Ali Trophy. He made his List A debut on 27 February 2021, for Puducherry in the 2020–21 Vijay Hazare Trophy.
