= Praveen Thakur =

Indian cricketer (born 1992)

Personal information
- Born: 15 December 1992 (age 33); Shimla, Himachal Pradesh, India
- Nickname: Bunty
- Batting: Left-handed
- Role: wicketkeeper
- Source: Cricinfo, 6 December 2018

Praveen Thakur (born 15 December 1992) is an Indian cricketer. He made his first-class debut for Himachal Pradesh in the 2018–19 Ranji Trophy on 6 December 2018. He made his List A debut on 1 March 2021, for Himachal Pradesh in the 2020–21 Vijay Hazare Trophy.
