= Shivam Sharma =

Indian cricketer (born 1993)

Personal information
- Born: 9 September 1993 (age 33); Delhi, India
- Batting: Right-handed
- Bowling: Right-arm off break
- Role: All-rounder

Domestic team information
- Years: Team
- 2014–2015: Kings XI Punjab
- Source: ESPNcricinfo, 10 May 2013

Shivam Sharma (born 9 September 1993) is a cricketer who plays for Kings XI Punjab. Sharma is an all-rounder who bats right-handed and bowls off break. In 2012, he captained the Delhi Under-19 and North Zone Under-19 cricket teams.

In 2014, he was signed up by Kings XI Punjab for INR 1 million, without having played any form of senior cricket. He made his senior cricket debut in the 2014 IPL for Kings XI Punjab against Royal Challengers Bangalore on 9 May 2014, and scored 4 runs and had bowling figures of 2/26 in 4 overs having dismissed Yuvraj Singh and Albie Morkel.
