= Karan Shinde =

Indian cricketer (born 1997)

Personal information
- Full name: Kirdant Karan Shinde
- Born: 19 September 1997 (age 29); Kurnool, Andhra Pradesh, India
- Source: ESPNcricinfo, 20 November 2016

Karan Shinde (born 19 September 1997) is an Indian cricketer. He made his Twenty20 debut for Andhra in the 2015–16 Syed Mushtaq Ali Trophy on 4 January 2016. He made his first-class debut for Andhra in the 2018–19 Ranji Trophy on 7 January 2019. He made his List A debut on 25 September 2019, for Andhra in the 2019–20 Vijay Hazare Trophy.
