= Kannan Vignesh =

Indian cricketer (born 1993)

Personal information
- Born: 15 October 1993 (age 33); Chennai, Tamil Nadu
- Batting: Left-handed
- Bowling: Slow left arm Orthodox

Domestic team information
- Years: Team
- 2020–21: Puducherry
- Source: ESPNcricinfo, 15 January 2021

Kannan Vignesh (born 15 October 1993) is an Indian cricketer. He made his Twenty20 debut on 15 January 2021, for Puducherry in the 2020–21 Syed Mushtaq Ali Trophy. He made his List A debut on 27 February 2021, for Puducherry in the 2020–21 Vijay Hazare Trophy.
