= St Xavier's College Ground =

Cricket ground

- Interactive map of St Xavier's College Ground
- Location: Thiruvananthapuram, India
- Country: India
- Establishment: 2014/15 (first recorded match)
- As of 29 October 2016; Source: Ground profile

St Xavier's College Ground (also known as KCA Cricket Ground) is a cricket ground in Thumba, Thiruvananthapuram, India. The first recorded match on the ground was in 2014/15. It was used as a venue for a first-class match in the 2016–17 Ranji Trophy tournament between Assam and Vidarbha.

== See also ==
- List of cricket grounds in India
