= Mayank Dagar =

Indian cricketer (born 1996)

Personal information
- Full name: Mayank Jitender Dagar
- Born: 11 November 1996 (age 30); Delhi, India
- Height: 5 ft 10 in (1.78 m)
- Batting: Right-handed
- Bowling: Slow left-arm orthodox
- Role: Bowler
- Relatives: Virender Sehwag (cousin-uncle)

Domestic team information
- Years: Team
- 2016–present: Himachal Pradesh
- 2023: Sunrisers Hyderabad
- 2024: Royal Challengers Bengaluru
- Source: ESPNcricinfo

Mayank Jitender Daggar (born 11 November 1996) is an Indian cricketer who plays for Himachal Pradesh in domestic cricket and has appeared in the Indian Premier League. He is a right-handed batsman and slow left-arm orthodox bowler. He was part of India's squad for 2016 Under-19 Cricket World Cup.

He made his first-class debut for Himachal Pradesh in the 2016–17 Ranji Trophy on 6 October 2016. In January 2018, he was bought by the Kings XI Punjab in the 2018 IPL auction. In July 2018, uncapped player Mayank Dagar scored 19.3 in yo-yo test, beating the record of Manish Pandey who had a top score of 19.2 achieved in 2017. He was bought by Sunrisers Hyderabad for Rs. 1.8 Crore, in the 2023 Indian Premier League auction.

== Personal life ==
Born in Delhi, Dagar attended the Bishop Cotton School in Shimla, which is one of the oldest boarding schools in Asia. His father Jitender Dagar, who played cricket at the university level, works as a contractor for Municipal Corporation of Delhi. Former Indian cricketer Virender Sehwag is a cousin of Dagar's mother.

== See also ==
- Vijay Zol
- Yogesh Takawale
- Hiten Dalal
