= Girinath Reddy =

Indian cricketer (born 1998)

Personal information
- Born: 8 October 1998 (age 28); Anantapur, Andhra Pradesh, India
- Source: ESPNcricinfo, 20 November 2016

Girinath Reddy (born 8 October 1998) is an Indian cricketer. He made his Twenty20 debut for Andhra in the 2015–16 Syed Mushtaq Ali Trophy on 4 January 2016. He made his List A debut for Andhra in the 2016–17 Vijay Hazare Trophy on 4 March 2017.

He made his first-class debut for Andhra in the 2018–19 Ranji Trophy on 20 November 2018. In January 2019, in the match against Andhra, he took his maiden five-wicket haul in first-class cricket.
