= Shivank Vashisht =

Indian cricketer (born 1995)

Personal information
- Born: 17 September 1995 (age 31); Delhi, India
- Batting: Left-handed
- Bowling: Left-arm off spinner
- Source: Cricinfo, 6 December 2018

Shivank Vashisht (born 17 September 1995) is an Indian cricketer. He made his first-class debut for Delhi in the 2018–19 Ranji Trophy on 6 December 2018. He made his Twenty20 debut on 19 January 2021, for Delhi in the 2020–21 Syed Mushtaq Ali Trophy. He made his List A debut on 21 February 2021, for Delhi in the 2020–21 Vijay Hazare Trophy.
