= Jonty Sidhu =

Indian cricketer (born 1997)

Personal information
- Born: 9 December 1997 (age 28); Delhi
- Batting: Left-handed
- Bowling: Right-arm off break

Domestic team information
- Years: Team
- 2018–present: Delhi
- Source: ESPNcricinfo, 6 December 2018

Jonty Sidhu (born 9 December 1997) is an Indian cricketer. He made his first-class debut for Delhi in the 2018–19 Ranji Trophy on 6 December 2018. He made his Twenty20 debut on 19 January 2021, for Delhi in the 2020–21 Syed Mushtaq Ali Trophy. He made his List A debut on 21 February 2021, for Delhi in the 2020–21 Vijay Hazare Trophy.
