= Ricky Bhui =

Indian cricketer (born 1996)

Personal information
- Full name: Ricky Kannakumar Bhui
- Born: 29 September 1996 (age 30); Bhopal, Madhya Pradesh, India
- Batting: Right-handed
- Bowling: Leg-Break googly
- Role: Batsman

Domestic team information
- Years: Team
- 2013/14–present: Andhra
- 2018–2019: Sunrisers Hyderabad
- 2024: Delhi Capitals

Career statistics
Competition	FC	LA	T20
Matches	78	77	71
Runs scored	5,323	2,269	1,789
Batting average	45.88	41.25	33.75
100s/50s	20/20	3/16	2/10
Top score	187	112*	108*
Balls bowled	354	169	18
Wickets	5	3	0
Bowling average	47.00	60.00	–
5 wickets in innings	0	0	–
10 wickets in match	0	0	–
Best bowling	1/0	2/8	–
Catches/stumpings	78/3	29/1	18/–
- Source: ESPNcricinfo, 23 March 2025

Ricky Bhui (born 29 September 1996) is an Indian cricketer. He is a right-handed batsman and occasional leg spinner. Bhui scored an unbeaten hundred on his List A debut and also scored an unbeaten fifty on his Twenty20 debut.

He currently plays for Andhra in domestic cricket and Delhi Capitals in the Indian Premier League. In December 2015 he was named in India's squad for the 2016 Under-19 Cricket World Cup and is the youngest player to feature in the tournament so far. Bhui has also captained the India u17 side for a Triangular series. In January 2018, he was bought by the Sunrisers Hyderabad in the 2018 IPL auction. He studied at Visakha Valley School in Visakhapatnam after graduation in 2020. The only player from the Andhra Pradesh Ranji team to make the cut for IPL 2018.

He was bought by Delhi Capitals for 20 lakhs as an uncapped Wicket-Keeper in 2024 IPL auction.

He was the leading run-scorer for Andhra in the 2018–19 Ranji Trophy, with 775 runs in eight matches. In August 2019, he was named in the India Blue team's squad for the 2019–20 Duleep Trophy. He was released by the Sunrisers Hyderabad ahead of the 2020 IPL auction.
