= Manish Golamaru =

Indian cricketer (born 1996)

Personal information
- Born: 13 September 1996 (age 30); Visakhapatnam, Andhra Pradesh, India
- Source: ESPNcricinfo, 20 September 2018

Manish Golamaru (born 13 September 1996) is an Indian cricketer. He made his List A debut for Andhra in the 2018–19 Vijay Hazare Trophy on 20 September 2018. He made his first-class debut for Andhra in the 2018–19 Ranji Trophy on 12 November 2018. He made his Twenty20 debut on 11 November 2019, for Andhra in the 2019–20 Syed Mushtaq Ali Trophy.
