= Rishi Dhawan =

Indian cricketer (born 1990)

Personal information
- Born: 19 February 1990 (age 36); Mandi, Himachal Pradesh, India
- Batting: Right-handed
- Bowling: Right-arm medium-fast
- Role: All-rounder
- Relatives: Raghav Dhawan (brother)

International information
- National side: India (2016)
- ODI debut (cap 208): 17 January 2016 v Australia
- Last ODI: 23 January 2016 v Australia
- Only T20I (cap 61): 18 June 2016 v Zimbabwe

Domestic team information
- Years: Team
- 2007–present: Himachal Pradesh
- 2008: Kings XI Punjab
- 2013: Mumbai Indians
- 2014–2016: Kings XI Punjab
- 2017: Kolkata Knight Riders
- 2022—2024: Punjab Kings

Career statistics
Competition	ODI	T20I	FC	LA
Matches	3	1	81	109
Runs scored	12	1	3,725	2,385
Batting average	12.00	–	40.05	39.09
100s/50s	0/0	0/0	4/30	1/14
Top score	9	1*	128	117*
Balls bowled	150	24	17,185	5,245
Wickets	1	1	309	158
Bowling average	160.00	42.00	27.17	29.70
5 wickets in innings	0	0	21	3
10 wickets in match	0	0	2	0
Best bowling	1/74	1/42	7/50	6/27
Catches/stumpings	0/–	2/–	40/–	28/–
- Source: ESPNcricinfo, 21 March 2022

Rishi Dhawan (born 19 February 1990) is an Indian cricketer who plays first-class and List A cricket for Himachal Pradesh. Dhawan is primarily a medium-fast bowling all-rounder who bats in the middle-order. Dhawan played for Kings XI Punjab in the 2008 IPL. He was signed up by the Mumbai Indians in 2013. In February 2017, he was bought by the Kolkata Knight Riders for the 2017 Indian Premier League for 55 lakhs.

== Career ==
He made his One Day International debut for India against Australia on 17 January 2016. He made his Twenty20 International (T20I) debut against Zimbabwe at Harare Sports Club on 18 June 2016.

He was the leading run-scorer for Himachal Pradesh in the 2018–19 Ranji Trophy, with 519 runs in eight matches. In December 2021, Dhawan led Himachal Pradesh to their maiden title in Indian domestic cricket, beating Tamil Nadu in the final of the 2021–22 Vijay Hazare Trophy. Dhawan put in a strong all round showing in the tournament, finishing as the second highest run scorer with 458 runs at an average of 76 and the second highest wicket taker with 17 wickets at an average of 23 in eight matches. Following this, in February 2022, he was bought by the Punjab Kings in the auction for the 2022 Indian Premier League tournament.

He also appeared with Bhawanipore Club in P. Sen Trophy.

In January 2025, he announced his retirement from Indian limited-overs cricket.
