= 2022–23 Ranji Trophy Plate Group =

Cricket tournament

- Dates: 13 December 2022 – 10 February 2023
- Administrator(s): BCCI
- Cricket format: First-class cricket
- Tournament format(s): Round-robin then knockout
- Participants: 6

The 2022–23 Ranji Trophy is the 88th season of the Ranji Trophy, the premier first-class cricket tournament in India. It is contested by 38 teams, divided into four elite groups and a plate group, with eight teams in the plate group. The tournament was announced by the Board of Control for Cricket in India (BCCI) on 8 August 2022.

== Points table ==
Pos	Team	Pld	W	L	T	D	NR	Pts	Quot
1	Meghalaya	5	4	1	0	0	0	25	1.421
2	Sikkim	5	3	1	0	1	0	20	1.401
3	Manipur	5	3	1	0	1	0	20	1.253
4	Bihar	5	1	1	0	3	0	14	1.258
5	Mizoram	5	1	3	0	1	0	8	0.921
6	Arunachal Pradesh	5	0	5	0	0	0	0	0.353

Updated to match(es) played on 13 January 2023. Source: ESPN Cricinfo

Advances to Plate Semi-Final

== Fixtures ==
=== Round 1 ===
13–16 December 2022
Scorecard

Manipur	v	Sikkim
186 (56.5 overs); Kishan Singha 42* (63); Sumit Singh 3/43 (12 overs)		220 (73.1 overs); Sumit Singh 47 (43); Pheiroijam Singh 9/69 (22 overs)
193 (84 overs); Ronald Longjam 50 (198); Palzor Tamang 5/52 (24 overs)		160/2 (54.2 overs); Nilesh Lamichaney 74 (113); Pheiroijam Singh 1/32 (15 overs)

Sikkim won by 8 wickets
Mining Cricket Stadium, Rangpo
Umpires: Satrajit Lahiri and Chandrakant Mhase
Player of the match: Nilesh Lamichaney (Sikkim)

- Manipur won the toss and elected to bat.
- Karnajit Yumnam, Pheiroijam Singh, Ronald Longjam (Manipur), Arun Chettri, Jeetendra Sharma and Pankaj Rawat (Sikkim) all made their first-class debuts.

13–15 December 2022
Scorecard

Arunachal Pradesh	v	Bihar
212 (74.3 overs); Akhilesh Sahani 66 (83); Ashutosh Aman 4/36 (18.3 overs)		517 (133.5 overs); Sachin Kumar 156 (198); Nabam Abo 5/164 (32 overs)
84 (29.4 overs); Rahul Dalal 25 (33); Malay Raj 5/35 (8.4 overs)

Bihar won by an innings and 221 runs
Urja Stadium, Patna
Umpires: Dharmesh Bhardwaj and Prahlad Rawat
Player of the match: Sachin Kumar (Bihar)

- Arunachal Pradesh won the toss and elected to bat.
- Rohan Sharma, Chetan Anand (Arunachal Pradesh), Adhiraj Johri and Baljeet Singh Bihari (Bihar) all made their first-class debuts.

13–16 December 2022
Scorecard

Mizoram	v	Meghalaya
252 (86.1 overs); Taruwar Kohli 123 (250); Rajesh Bishnoi 4/62 (27.1 overs)		171 (67.4 overs); Kishan Lyngdoh 40 (118); Avinash Yadav 6/39 (23.4 overs)
216 (80.3 overs); Shreevats Goswami 64 (100); Rajesh Bishnoi 5/61 (31.3 overs)		300/8 (105.4 overs); Puneet Bisht 53 (76); Avinash Yadav 5/103 (50 overs)

Meghalaya won by 2 wickets
GS Patel Stadium, Nadiad
Umpires: Saurabh Dhote and Ravi Subramanian
Player of the match: Taruwar Kohli (Mizoram)

- Meghalaya won the toss and elected to field.
- Jehu Anderson, Naveen Gurung, Zothanzuala (Mizoram) and Abhishek Kumar (Meghalaya) all made their first-class debuts.

=== Round 2 ===
20–21 December 2022
Scorecard

Sikkim	v	Meghalaya
140 (59 overs); Ankur Malik 37 (51); Rajesh Bishnoi 4/28 (22 overs)		153 (45.4 overs); Akash Choudhary 31* (51); Palzor Tamang 5/43 (17.4 overs)
90 (34.1 overs); Pankaj Rawat 26 (40); Rajesh Bishnoi 5/19 (10.1 overs)		78/0 (8 overs); Raj Biswa 56* (32)

Meghalaya won by 10 wickets
Meghalaya Cricket Association Ground, Shillong
Umpires: Bhavesh Patel and Navdeep Singh
Player of the match: Rajesh Bishnoi (Meghalaya)

- Sikkim won the toss and elected to bat.
- Bijay Prasad (Sikkim) made his first-class debut.

20–21 December 2022
Scorecard

Arunachal Pradesh	v	Mizoram
63 (30.4 overs); Kumar Nyompu 24 (52); Taruwar Kohli 4/2 (8 overs)		338 (90 overs); Taruwar Kohli 203 (297); Nabam Abo 4/75 (24 overs)
157 (48.4 overs); Kumar Nyompu 64* (128); Avinash Yadav 4/42 (11.4 overs)

Mizoram won by an innings and 118 runs
Lal Bahadur Shastri Stadium, Anand
Umpires: Bhanushali Ashish and Saidharshan Kumar
Player of the match: Taruwar Kohli (Mizoram)

- Mizoram won the toss and elected to field.

20–23 December 2022
Scorecard

Bihar	v	Manipur
311 (97.4 overs); Babul Kumar 156 (228); Rex Rajkumar 4/62 (21 overs)		296 (102 overs); Prafullomani Singh 75 (107); Malay Raj 5/53 (17 overs)
287/9d (81 overs); Veer Pratap Singh 63 (76); Kishan Singha 3/54 (29 overs)		248/8 (74 overs); Langlonyamba Keishangbam 79* (185); Ashutosh Aman 4/61 (27 overs)

Match drawn
Gujarat College Ground, Ahmedabad
Umpires: Yeshwant Barde and Prahlad Rawat
Player of the match: Babul Kumar (Bihar)

- Bihar won the toss and elected to bat.
- Bikash Singh (Manipur) made his first-class debut.

=== Round 3 ===
27–30 December 2022
Scorecard

Mizoram	v	Sikkim
263 (101.4 overs); Taruwar Kohli 94 (190); Palzor Tamang 4/45 (27.4 overs)		176 (61 overs); Sumit Singh 99 (133); Avinash Yadav 5/71 (21 overs)
156 (58 overs); Taruwar Kohli 50 (99); Palzor Tamang 5/25 (20 overs)		244/6 (77.2 overs); Nilesh Lamichaney 108 (216); Remruatdika Ralte 3/72 (24 overs)

Sikkim won by 4 wickets
Mining Cricket Stadium, Rangpo
Umpires: M Ashwin Kumar and KR Vasuki
Player of the match: Nilesh Lamichaney (Sikkim)

- Sikkim won the toss and elected to field.
- Md Saptulla (Sikkim) made his first-class debut.

27–29 December 2022
Scorecard

Bihar	v	Meghalaya
264 (72 overs); Bipin Saurabh 107 (115); Rajesh Bishnoi 6/60 (24 overs)		167 (38.5 overs); Dippu Sangma 57 (95); Sachin Kumar 3/28 (7.5 overs)
99 (36.2 overs); Babul Kumar 31 (48); Abhishek Kumar 4/26 (15.2 overs)		200/6 (45 overs); Swarajeet Das 81 (93); Abhijeet Saket 3/39 (12 overs)

Meghalaya won by 4 wickets
Meghalaya Cricket Association Ground, Shillong
Umpires: Ajith Kumar and K Raghuram
Player of the match: Rajesh Bishnoi (Meghalaya)

- Bihar won the toss and elected to bat.
- Anuj Raj and Raghuvendra Pratap Singh (Bihar) both made their first-class debuts.

27–30 December 2022
Scorecard

Arunachal Pradesh	v	Manipur
233 (87.5 overs); Kamsha Yangfo 41 (63); Bishworjit Konthoujam 5/47 (19.5 overs)		287 (78.1 overs); Langlonyamba Keishangbam 91 (138); Chandan Kumar Singh 3/66 (18 overs)
251 (95.5 overs); Anup Ahlawat 52 (108); Kishan Singha 6/63 (29.5 overs)		198/2 (42.2 overs); Prafullomani Singh 87* (55); Nabam Tempol 1/45 (12 overs)

Manipur won by 8 wickets
Lal Bahadur Shastri Stadium, Anand
Umpires: Indranil Chakravarti and Prabhakar Rao
Player of the match: Kishan Singha (Manipur)

- Manipur won the toss and elected to field.
- Anup Ahlawat, Vipin Dhaka and Chandan Kumar Singh (Arunachal Pradesh) all made their first-class debuts.

=== Round 4 ===
3–6 January 2023
Scorecard

Sikkim	v	Bihar
157 (64.5 overs); Lee Yong Lepcha 51 (139); Veer Pratap Singh 5/30 (17 overs)		157 (39.3 overs); Sakibul Gani 57 (92); Sumit Singh 6/63 (15.3 overs)
122/4 (47 overs); Anwesh Sharma 50* (109); Raghvendra Pratap Singh 2/31 (7 overs)

Match drawn
Urja Stadium, Patna
Umpires: Mukund Mandale and Gajanand Vashistha
Player of the match: Sumit Singh (Sikkim)

- Bihar won the toss and elected to field.
- No play was held on Day 1 due to rain.

3–5 January 2023
Scorecard

Mizoram	v	Manipur
104 (35.4 overs); Shreevats Goswami 58 (89); Pheiroijam Singh 4/35 (11 overs)		277 (106.1 overs); Pheiroijam Singh 51* (129); Taruwar Kohli 4/47 (23 overs)
137 (53.2 overs); Shreevats Goswami 62 (71); Bishworjit Konthoujam 5/55 (17 overs)

Manipur won by an innings and 36 runs
Narendra Modi Stadium, Ahmedabad
Umpires: VM Dhokre and Keyur Kelkar
Player of the match: Pheiroijam Singh (Manipur)

- Manipur won the toss and elected to field.
- Vanlalhruailuanga (Mizoram) made his first-class debut.

3–6 January 2023
Scorecard

Meghalaya	v	Arunachal Pradesh
610/6d (135.3 overs); Puneet Bisht 215 (213); Rakesh Kumar 3/119 (41 overs)		331 (90.2 overs); Anup Ahlawat 153 (152); Arbin Singh 3/53 (15 overs)
132/3d (25.2 overs); Raj Biswa 53* (72); Chandan Kumar Singh 2/28 (7.2 overs)		185 (64 overs); Rahul Dalal 96 (116); Arbin Singh 5/42 (16 overs)

Meghalaya won by 226 runs
Lal Bahadur Shastri Stadium, Anand
Umpires: Amit Bansal and Vijay Shirpur
Player of the match: Puneet Bisht (Meghalaya)

- Arunachal Pradesh won the toss and elected to field.
- Arbin Singh (Meghalaya), Siddharth Balodi, Ngurang James and Ngurang Tana (Arunachal Pradesh) all made their first-class debuts.

=== Round 5 ===
10–12 January 2023
Scorecard

Arunachal Pradesh	v	Sikkim
213 (56.3 overs); Rahul Dalal 147 (116); Palzor Tamang 4/53 (21 overs)		532 (125.4 overs); Ashish Thapa 150 (285); Nabam Abo 4/156 (37 overs)
61 (26.1 overs); Tarun Valani 16 (19); Lee Yong Lepcha 5/17 (7.1 overs)

Sikkim won by an innings and 258 runs
Mining Cricket Stadium, Rangpo
Umpires: Sud Abhiroope and Pashchim Pathak
Player of the match: Palzor Tamang (Sikkim)

- Arunachal Pradesh won the toss and elected to bat.
- Kale Cheda, Nabam Tatang, Tana Tatar and Tarun Valani (Arunachal Pradesh) all made their first-class debuts.

10–12 January 2023
Scorecard

Meghalaya	v	Manipur
157 (53.3 overs); Kishan Lyngdoh 33 (44); Kishan Singha 6/18 (13.3 overs)		220 (65.2 overs); Prafullomani Singh 50* (81); Rajesh Bishnoi 5/63 (24.2 overs)
91 (34 overs); Kishan Lyngdoh 29 (50); Rex Rajkumar 3/21 (6 overs)		29/2 (9 overs); Basir Rahman 14* (27); Sanvert Kurkalang 1/11 (3 overs)

Manipur won by 8 wickets
Meghalaya Cricket Association Ground, Shillong
Umpires: Yashodan Gavankar and GS Ananth Ramakrishnan
Player of the match: Kishan Singha (Manipur)

- Manipur won the toss and elected to field.
- Sanvert Kurkalang (Meghalaya) made his first-class debut.

10–13 January 2023
Scorecard

Bihar	v	Mizoram
474 (165.1 overs); Babul Kumar 209 (359); Avinash Yadav 3/94 (47.1 overs)		176 (52.2 overs); Shreevats Goswami 79 (118); Sachin Kumar 4/24 (8.2 overs)
		379/6 (110.4 overs) (f/o); Jehu Anderson 100* (190); Veer Pratap Singh 2/54 (16 overs)

Match drawn
GS Patel Stadium, Nadiad
Umpires: Vikas Bhatt and Vinod Seshan
Player of the match: Babul Kumar (Bihar)

- Mizoram won the toss and elected to field.
- Varun Raj (Bihar) made his first-class debut.
