= 2021–22 Ranji Trophy Plate Group =

Cricket tournament

- Dates: 17 February – 26 June 2022
- Administrator(s): BCCI
- Cricket format: First-class cricket
- Tournament format(s): Round-robin then knockout
- Participants: 6

The 2021–22 Ranji Trophy was the 87th season of the Ranji Trophy, the premier first-class cricket tournament in India. It was contested by 38 teams, divided into eight elite groups, with six teams in Plate group . All the Plate Group league matches took place in Kolkata. The tournament was announced by the Board of Control for Cricket in India (BCCI) on 3 July 2021.

In the opening round of fixtures, Sakibul Gani of Bihar became the first player to score a triple century on their first-class debut, scoring 341 runs. Nagaland won the Plate Group to progress to the knockout stage of the tournament.

== Points table ==
Pos	Team	Pld	W	L	T	D	NR	BP	Pts	Quot
1	Nagaland	3	3	0	0	0	0	1	19	2.304
2	Manipur	3	1	1	0	1	0	1	10	1.062
3	Sikkim	3	1	1	0	1	0	0	9	1.227
4	Arunachal Pradesh	3	1	2	0	0	0	0	6	0.571
5	Bihar	3	0	1	0	2	0	-2	4	1.249
6	Mizoram	3	0	1	0	2	0	-4	2	0.466

Updated to match(es) played on 6 March 2022. Source: ESPN Cricinfo

Advances to Preliminary quarter-final

== Fixtures ==
=== Round 1 ===
17–20 February 2022
Scorecard

Bihar	v	Mizoram
686/5d (159.4 overs); Sakibul Gani 341 (405); Iqbal Abdulla 2/136 (48 overs)		328 (122.3 overs); Taruwar Kohli 151 (289); Sachin Kumar 4/67 (30.3 overs)
		199/4 (60 overs) (f/o); Taruwar Kohli 101* (161); Abhijeet Saket 3/29 (9 overs)

Match drawn
Jadavpur University Campus Ground, Kolkata
Umpires: Mohit Krishnadas and Rajesh Kannan
Player of the match: Sakibul Gani (Bihar)

- Bihar won the toss and elected to bat.
- Bipin Saurabh, Malay Raj, Sachin Kumar, Sakibul Gani (Bihar), Joseph Lalthankhuma, Remruatdika Ralte and Vikash Kumar (Mizoram) all made their first-class debuts.
- Sakibul Gani (Bihar) became the first player to score a triple century on their first-class debut.

17–20 February 2022
Scorecard

Sikkim	v	Nagaland
302 (92.1 overs); Anwesh Sharma 87 (195); Nagaho Chishi 5/51 (19.1 overs)		412 (114.3 overs); Chetan Bist 115 (172); Palzor Tamang 5/33 (16 overs)
283 (82 overs); Sumit Singh 85 (91); Shrikant Mundhe 3/46 (13 overs)		175/4 (40 overs); Shrikant Mundhe 59* (96); Lee Yong Lepcha 2/35 (5 overs)

Nagaland won by 6 wickets
Videocon Academy Ground, Kolkata
Umpires: Bharati Vij and Somnath Jha
Player of the match: Chetan Bist (Nagaland)

- Sikkim won the toss and elected to bat.
- Ankur Malik, Anwesh Sharma, Codanda Ajit Karthik, Kranthi Kumar, Rajiv Malay (Sikkim), Khrievitso Kense and Yugandhar Singh (Nagaland) all made their first-class debuts.

17–20 February 2022
Scorecard

Arunachal Pradesh	v	Manipur
119 (57 overs); Neelam Obi 61 (152); Kishan Singha 4/11 (11 overs)		296 (96.1 overs); Al Bashid Muhammed 79 (159); Akhilesh Sahani 3/76 (21 overs)
152 (53.3 overs); Akhilesh Sahani 50 (58); Kangabam Singh 4/25 (15.3 overs)

Manipur won by an innings and 25 runs
CC & FC Ground, Kolkata
Umpires: Manish Jain and Parashar Joshi
Player of the match: Al Bashid Muhammed (Manipur)

- Arunachal Pradesh won the toss and elected to bat.
- Johnson Singh, Kishan Singha (Manipur), Manvan Patel, Nazeeb Saiyed and Suraj Tayam (Arunachal Pradesh) all made their first-class debuts.

=== Round 2 ===
24–27 February 2022
Scorecard

Bihar	v	Sikkim
431/9d (115.1 overs); Sakibul Gani 98 (135); Palzor Tamang 3/93 (23 overs)		673/8d (168 overs); Kranthi Kumar 287 (390); Abhijeet Saket 3/114 (23 overs)
263/3 (48.1 overs); Yashasvi Rishav 112* (134); Codanda Ajit Karthik 2/75 (12 overs)

Match drawn
Eden Gardens, Kolkata
Umpires: Rajesh Kannan and Akshay Marathe
Player of the match: Kranthi Kumar (Sikkim)

- Sikkim won the toss and elected to field.
- Abhinav Kumar (Bihar) made his first-class debut.

24–27 February 2022
Scorecard

Arunachal Pradesh	v	Nagaland
216 (59 overs); Akhilesh Sahani 67 (73); Rongsen Jonathan 4/69 (19 overs)		536/7d (128 overs); Shrikant Mundhe 207 (302); Yab Niya 3/127 (28 overs)
237 (92.1 overs); Kamsha Yangfo 74 (187); Rongsen Jonathan 5/52 (25.1 overs)

Nagaland won by an innings and 83 runs
Videocon Academy Ground, Kolkata
Umpires: Ganesh Charhate and Mohit Krishnadas
Player of the match: Shrikant Mundhe (Nagaland)

- Arunachal Pradesh won the toss and elected to bat.
- Kumar Nyompu and Techi Kagung (Arunachal Pradesh) both made their first-class debuts.

24–27 February 2022
Scorecard

Manipur	v	Mizoram
197 (66.3 overs); Nitesh Sedai 95 (139); Taruwar Kohli 4/43 (15 overs)		127 (49.5 overs); Iqbal Abdulla 41 (71); Kangabam Singh 3/24 (17 overs)
425/9d (121.4 overs); Al Bashid Muhammed 150 (307); Taruwar Kohli 4/65 (21 overs)		302/8 (104.5 overs); Uday Kaul 88* (215); Bishworjit Konthoujam 4/46 (21 overs)

Match drawn
Jadavpur University Campus Ground, Kolkata
Umpires: Somnath Jha and Bharati Vij
Player of the match: Al Bashid Muhammed (Manipur)

- Mizoram won the toss and elected to field.
- B Lalnunfela (Mizoram) and Nitesh Sedai (Manipur) both made their first-class debuts.

=== Round 3 ===
3–6 March 2022
Scorecard

Arunachal Pradesh	v	Bihar
196 (62.2 overs); Akhilesh Sahani 62 (76); Ashutosh Aman 4/51 (23.2 overs)		109 (36.3 overs); Sakibul Gani 38 (66); Nabam Abo 6/32 (10.3 overs)
253 (91.1 overs); Rajesh Bishnoi 106 (200); Ashutosh Aman 5/56 (33 overs)		325 (92.5 overs); Ashutosh Aman 75 (144); Rajesh Bishnoi 5/103 (38 overs)

Arunachal won by 15 runs
Videocon Academy Ground, Kolkata
Umpires: Manish Jain and Pranav Joshi
Player of the match: Rajesh Bishnoi (Arunachal Pradesh)

- Bihar won the toss and elected to field.
- Amit Sotiya, Banshidar Kumar, Govind Choudhary, Saurav Kumar, Shivam Singh, Vikrant Singh (Bihar), Nabam Abo and Teshi Tiku (Arunachal Pradesh) all made their first-class debuts.

3–6 March 2022
Scorecard

Nagaland	v	Mizoram
509 (137.3 overs); Shrikant Mundhe 123 (226); Iqbal Abdulla 3/107 (43 overs)		95 (33.1 overs); Sumit Lama 33 (48); Raja Swarnkar 5/17 (8 overs)
295/5d (71 overs); Rongsen Jonathan 113 (150); Sumit Lama 2/69 (16 overs)		261 (93.4 overs); Taruwar Kohli 151* (251); Imliwati Lemtur 4/49 (24 overs)

Nagaland won by 448 runs
Eden Gardens, Kolkata
Umpires: Rajesh Kannan and Akshay Marathe
Player of the match: Raja Swarnkar (Nagaland)

- Mizoram won the toss and elected to field.
- Raja Swarnkar (Nagaland) made his first-class debut.

3–6 March 2022
Scorecard

Sikkim	v	Manipur
462 (113.3 overs); Liyan Khan 179 (237); Bishworjit Konthoujam 4/96 (20.3 overs)		324 (93 overs); Kangabam Singh 79 (134); Tarun Sharma 4/58 (17 overs)
228/3 (60 overs); Codanda Ajit Karthik 104 (110); Rex Rajkumar 2/51 (15 overs)		176 (72.3 overs); L Kishan Singha 30 (80); Sumit Singh 3/15 (15 overs)

Sikkim won by 190 runs
Jadavpur University Campus Ground, Kolkata
Umpires: Ganesh Charhate and Somnath Jha
Player of the match: Liyan Khan (Sikkim)

- Manipur won the toss and elected to field.
- Tarun Sharma (Sikkim) made his first-class debut.
