= 2022–23 Vijay Hazare Trophy Group B =

Cricket tournament

- Dates: 12 November – 2 December 2022
- Administrator(s): BCCI
- Cricket format: List A cricket
- Tournament format(s): Round-robin
- Participants: 8

The 2022–23 Vijay Hazare Trophy is the twenty first season of the Vijay Hazare Trophy, a List A cricket tournament that is being played in India. It was contested by 38 teams, divided into five groups, with eight teams in Group B. The tournament was announced by the BCCI on 8 August 2022.

== Points table ==
Pos	Team	Pld	W	L	NR	Pts	NRR
1	Assam	7	6	1	0	24	1.360
2	Karnataka	7	6	1	0	24	1.721
3	Jharkhand	7	5	2	0	20	1.064
4	Rajasthan	7	4	3	0	16	0.952
5	Delhi	7	3	4	0	12	0.358
6	Vidarbha	7	3	4	0	12	0.455
7	Meghalaya	7	1	6	0	4	−2.669
8	Sikkim	7	0	7	0	0	−3.421

Source: ESPN Cricinfo
Rules for classification: 1) Points; 2) Head-to-head; 3) Net run rate.

Advances to Quarter-final
Advances to Preliminary quarter-final

== Fixtures ==
=== Round 1 ===
12 November 2022
Scorecard

Assam; 271 (46.5 overs)	v	Rajashthan; 128 (33.3 overs)
Riyan Parag 117 (84); Mohit Jain 3/58 (9 overs)		Abhijeet Tomar 59 (86); Avinov Choudhury 3/25 (7 overs)

Assam won by 143 runs
Jadavpur University Campus Ground, Kolkata
Umpires: Abhijit Bengeri and Virender Sharma

- Rajasthan won the toss and elected to field.
- Avinov Choudhury, Subham Mandal (Assam), Mohit Jain and Kunal Singh Rathore (Rajasthan) all made their List A debuts.

12 November 2022
Scorecard

Karnataka; 259 (50 overs)	v	Meghalaya; 144 (46 overs)
Shreyas Gopal 64 (76); Abhishek Kumar 3/54 (10 overs)		Surya Rai 38 (71); Shreyas Gopal 3/21 (8 overs)

Karnataka won by 115 runs
CC&FC Ground, Kolkata
Umpires: Bhavesh Patel and Nikhil Patwardhan

- Karnataka won the toss and elected to bat.
- Manoj Bhandage, Nikin Jose, Vidhwath Kaverappa (Karnataka), Abhishek Kumar, Surya Rai and Pringsang Sangma (Meghalaya) all made their List A debuts.

12 November 2022
Scorecard

Vidarbha; 207 (47.2 overs)	v	Delhi; 208/5 (44.5 overs)
Ganesh Satish 45 (74); Ishant Sharma 3/24 (9.2 overs)		Lalit Yadav 56* (73); Aditya Sarwate 2/29 (10 overs)

Delhi won by 5 wickets
Videocon Academy Ground, Kolkata
Umpires: Anil Dandekar and Saidharshan Kumar

- Delhi won the toss and elected to field.
- Yash Dhull (Delhi) made his List A debut.

12 November 2022
Scorecard

Jharkhand; 309/3 (50 overs)	v	Sikkim; 116 (40.1 overs)
Virat Singh 75 (89); Lee Yong Lepcha 2/38 (10 overs)		Sumit Singh 31 (33); Rahul Shukla 5/19 (7 overs)

Jharkhand won by 193 runs
Eden Gardens, Kolkata
Umpires: Nand Kishore and Sundaram Ravi

- Sikkim won the toss and elected to field.
- Ankur Malik and James Rai (Sikkim) both made their List A debuts.

=== Round 2 ===
13 November 2022
Scorecard

Sikkim; 110 (42 overs)	v	Rajasthan; 115/3 (17.4 overs)
Palzor Tamang 22 (39); Rahul Chahar 5/24 (10 overs)		Abhijeet Tomar 75* (50); Sumit Singh 2/31 (5 overs)

Rajashthan won by 7 wickets
Jadavpur University Campus Ground, Kolkata
Umpires: Bhavesh Patel and Virender Sharma

- Sikkim won the toss and elected to bat.

13 November 2022
Scorecard

Karnataka; 314/7 (50 overs)	v	Vidarbha; 248/9 (50 overs)
Nikin Jose 96 (121); Darshan Nalkande 3/74 (10 overs)		Akshay Karnewar 104* (131); Vasuki Koushik 4/27 (10 overs)

Karnataka won by 66 runs
CC&FC Ground, Kolkata
Umpires: Saidharshan Kumar and Nikhil Patwardhan

- Vidarbha won the toss and elected to field.

13 November 2022
Scorecard

Meghalaya; 216/7 (50 overs)	v	Delhi; 219/2 (32.2 overs)
Puneet Bisht 75 (80); Nitish Rana 2/27 (8 overs)		Himmat Singh 85 (88); Chirag Khurana 1/12 (2 overs)

Delhi won by 8 wickets
Videocon Academy Ground, Kolkata
Umpires: Abhijit Bengeri and Sundaram Ravi

- Delhi won the toss and elected to field.
- Sanvert Kurkalang (Meghalaya) and Harshit Rana (Delhi) both made their List A debuts.

13 November 2022
Scorecard

Assam; 163 (39.4 overs)	v	Jharkhand; 166/2 (35 overs)
Sibsankar Roy 36 (55); Vivekanand Tiwari 4/42 (10 overs)		Utkarsh Singh 83* (103); Avinov Choudhury 1/18 (3 overs)

Jharkhand won by 8 wickets
Eden Gardens, Kolkata
Umpires: Anil Dandekar and Nand Kishore

- Jharkhand won the toss and elected to field.

=== Round 3 ===
15 November 2022
Scorecard

Jharkhand; 107 (40.4 overs)	v	Karnataka; 108/4 (26.3 overs)
Kumar Kushagra 56 (85); Vasuki Koushik 3/18 (10 overs)		Mayank Agarwal 53 (63); Shahbaz Nadeem 2/38 (8 overs)

Karnataka won by 6 wickets
Jadavpur University Campus Ground, Kolkata
Umpires: Nand Kishore and Nikhil Patwardhan

- Jharkhand won the toss and elected to bat.

15 November 2022
Scorecard

Assam; 221/9 (50 overs)	v	Meghalaya; 57 (20.4 overs)
Mukhtar Hussain 47* (33); Abhishek Kumar 5/41 (10 overs)		Chirag Khurana 23 (29); Avinov Choudhury 3/9 (4.4 overs)

Assam won by 164 runs
CC&FC Ground, Kolkata
Umpires: Bhavesh Patel and Sundaram Ravi

- Assam won the toss and elected to bat.
- Sunil Lachit (Assam) made his List A debut.

15 November 2022
Scorecard

Sikkim; 97 (26.5 overs)	v	Vidarbha; 101/3 (17.2 overs)
Sumit Singh 53 (61); Aditya Sarwate 3/18 (7 overs)		Jitesh Sharma 48 (29); Jeetendra Sharma 1/13 (3 overs)

Vidarbha won by 7 wickets
Videocon Academy Ground, Kolkata
Umpires: Abhijit Bengeri and Anil Dandekar

- Sikkim won the toss and elected to bat.
- Jeetendra Sharma (Sikkim) made his List A debut.

15 November 2022
Scorecard

Rajashthan; 218 (48.5 overs)	v	Delhi; 166 (42.1 overs)
Kunal Singh Rathore 70 (75); Mayank Yadav 3/59 (9.5 overs)		Shivank Vashisht 51 (60); Aniket Choudhary 3/26 (8 overs)

Rajasthan won by 52 runs
Eden Gardens, Kolkata
Umpires: Saidharshan Kumar and Virender Sharma

- Delhi won the toss and elected to field.
- Ayush Badoni (Delhi) made his List A debut.

=== Round 4 ===
17 November 2022
Scorecard

Delhi; 159 (45.4 overs)	v	Karnataka; 161/6 (29.4 overs)
Lalit Yadav 59 (100); Vasuki Koushik 3/23 (10 overs)		Ravikumar Samarth 59 (73); Mayank Yadav 4/47 (8 overs)

Karnataka won by 4 wickets
Jadavpur University Campus Ground, Kolkata
Umpires: Bhavesh Patel and Nikhil Patwardhan

- Karnataka won the toss and elected to field.

17 November 2022
Scorecard

Meghalaya; 111 (40 overs)	v	Vidarbha; 113/1 (27.1 overs)
Rajesh Bishnoi 53* (87); Nachiket Bhute 4/21 (10 overs)		Aditya Sarwate 48* (58); Abhishek Kumar 1/14 (7 overs)

Vidarbha won by 9 wickets
CC&FC Ground, Kolkata
Umpires: Anil Dandekar and Saidharshan Kumar

- Meghalaya won the toss and elected to bat.
- Riboklang Hynniewta (Meghalaya) made his List A debut.

17 November 2022
Scorecard

Assam; 307/8 (50 overs)	v	Sikkim; 127 (36 overs)
Riyan Parag 128 (93); Ankur Malik 2/49 (8 overs)		Palzor Tamang 40 (62); Sunil Lachit 3/33 (8 overs)

Assam won by 180 runs
Videocon Academy Ground, Kolkata
Umpires: Nand Kishore and Sundaram Ravi

- Sikkim won the toss and elected to field.

17 November 2022
Scorecard

Rajasthan; 270 (49 overs)	v	Jharkhand; 271/5 (49 overs)
Yash Kothari 139 (144); Rahul Shukla 5/53 (9 overs)		Utkarsh Singh 91 (110); Aniket Choudhary 2/45 (10 overs)

Jharkhand won by 5 wickets
Eden Gardens, Kolkata
Umpires: Abhijit Bengeri and Virender Sharma

- Jharkhand won the toss and elected to field.

=== Round 5 ===
19 November 2022
Scorecard

Jharkhand; 321/2 (50 overs)	v	Meghalaya; 129 (40.3 overs)
Utkarsh Singh 128* (143); Dippu Sangma 1/20 (5 overs)		Puneet Bisht 50 (42); Vikash Singh 3/17 (8 overs)

Jharkhand won by 192 runs
Jadavpur University Campus Ground, Kolkata
Umpires: Anil Dandekar and Nand Kishore

- Meghalaya won the toss and elected to field.

19 November 2022
Scorecard

Sikkim; 76 (34.4 overs)	v	Delhi; 77/0 (9.2 overs)
Pankaj Rawat 32 (86); Lalit Yadav 3/12 (8 overs)		Dhruv Shorey 43* (28)

Delhi won by 10 wickets
CC&FC Ground, Kolkata
Umpires: Abhijit Bengeri and Sundaram Ravi

- Delhi won the toss and elected to field.

19 November 2022
Scorecard

Karnataka; 296/4 (50 overs)	v	Assam; 297/4 (48.2 overs)
Nikin Jose 100 (106); Riyan Parag 2/76 (9 overs)		Swarupam Purkayastha 112* (102); M Venkatesh 2/46 (7 overs)

Assam won by 6 wickets
Videocon Academy Ground, Kolkata
Umpires: Saidharshan Kumar and Nikhil Patwardhan

- Assam won the toss and elected to field.
- Nihal Ullal (Karnataka) made his List A debut.

19 November 2022
Scorecard

Vidarbha; 240 (47.2 overs)	v	Rajasthan; 243/4 (44.1 overs)
Atharva Taide 51 (74); Kamlesh Nagarkoti 3/49 (10 overs)		Yash Kothari 109* (118); Aditya Sarwate 2/37 (10 overs)

Rajasthan won by 6 wickets
Eden Gardens, Kolkata
Umpires: Bhavesh Patel and Virender Sharma

- Rajasthan won the toss and elected to field.

=== Round 6 ===
21 November 2022
Scorecard

Vidarbha; 261/9 (50 overs)	v	Assam; 262/3 (47.3 overs)
Akshay Wadkar 69 (72); Rajjakuddin Ahmed 3/67 (10 overs)		Kunal Saikia 65 (89); Umesh Yadav 1/50 (8.3 overs)

Assam won by 7 wickets
Jadavpur University Campus Ground, Kolkata
Umpires: Abhijit Bengeri and Anil Dandekar

- Assam won the toss and elected to field.

21 November 2022
Scorecard

Delhi; 259/5 (50 overs)	v	Jharkhand; 260/5 (48.5 overs)
Ayush Badoni 91* (69); Sushant Mishra 2/59 (10 overs)		Virat Singh 116* (128); Shivank Vashisht 2/38 (8 overs)

Jharkhand won by 5 wickets
CC&FC Ground, Kolkata
Umpires: Bhavesh Patel and Sundaram Ravi

- Delhi won the toss and elected to bat.

21 November 2022
Scorecard

Rajasthan; 390/4 (50 overs)	v	Meghalaya; 94 (36.1 overs)
Aditya Garhwal 149* (70); Rajesh Bishnoi 1/53 (10 overs)		Larry Sangma 20 (45); Shubham Sharma 3/18 (10 overs)

Rajasthan won by 296 runs
Videocon Academy Ground, Kolkata
Umpires: Saidharshan Kumar and Virender Sharma

- Meghalaya won the toss and elected to field.
- Sahil Dhiwan (Rajasthan) and Junjun Sangma (Meghalaya) both made their List A debuts.

21 November 2022
Scorecard

Sikkim; 117 (46.2 overs)	v	Karnataka; 121/4 (24.4 overs)
Sumit Singh 42 (61); Vasuki Koushik 3/16 (9 overs)		Mayank Agarwal 54* (57); Palzor Tamang 3/24 (7.4 overs)

Karnataka won by 6 wickets
Eden Gardens, Kolkata
Umpires: Nand Kishore and Nikhil Patwardhan

- Karnataka won the toss and elected to field.

=== Round 7 ===
23 November 2022
Scorecard

Assam; 250 (49.4 overs)	v	Delhi; 225 (49 overs)
Rishav Das 93* (92); Nitish Rana 3/33 (10 overs)		Himmat Singh 84 (104); Mukhtar Hussain 2/22 (6 overs)

Assam won by 25 runs
Jadavpur University Campus Ground, Kolkata
Umpires: Anil Dandekar and Saidharshan Kumar

- Delhi won the toss and elected to field.
- Yogesh Sharma (Delhi) made his List A debut.

23 November 2022
Scorecard

Vidarbha; 297/3 (50 overs)	v	Jharkhand; 288/6 (50 overs)
Faiz Fazal 120 (133); Bal Krishna 2/45 (10 overs)		Saurabh Tiwary 138* (131); Akshay Karnewar 2/49 (9 overs)

Vidarbha won by 9 runs
CC&FC Ground, Kolkata
Umpires: Abhijit Bengeri and Nikhil Patwardhan

- Jharkhand won the toss and elected to field.

23 November 2022
Scorecard

Karnataka; 208 (48.4 overs)	v	Rajasthan; 148 (41.1 overs)
Nikin Jose 67 (81); Aniket Choudhary 3/28 (9.4 overs)		Yash Kothari 49 (81); Ronit More 3/35 (10 overs)

Karnataka won by 60 runs
Videocon Academy Ground, Kolkata
Umpires: Bhavesh Patel and Virender Sharma

- Rajasthan won the toss and elected to field.

23 November 2022
Scorecard

Meghalaya; 226/9 (50 overs)	v	Sikkim; 167 (45.2 overs)
Sylvester Mylliempdah 49 (84); Sumit Singh 5/69 (10 overs)		Anwesh Sharma 47 (95); Sylvester Mylliempdah 3/37 (9.2 overs)

Meghalaya won by 59 runs
Eden Gardens, Kolkata
Umpires: Nand Kishore and Sundaram Ravi

- Meghalaya won the toss and elected to bat.
