= North East Zone cricket team =

Indian cricket team

North East Zone

Personnel
- Captain: Rongsen Jonathan

Team information
- Established: 2022

History
- Duleep Trophy wins: 0
- Deodhar Trophy wins: 0

North East Zone cricket team is a cricket team that plays first-class and List A cricket in the Duleep Trophy and Deodhar Trophy. The team is geographically based in Northeast India. They are currently being captained by Hokaito Zhimomi. It is a composite team of players from six teams from north east India: Arunachal Pradesh, Manipur, Meghalaya, Mizoram, Nagaland and Sikkim.

== History ==
Before the 2022–23 season, inter zonal cricket in India had consisted of five teams, representing the Central, East, North, South and West zones. With the addition of Arunachal Pradesh, Manipur, Meghalaya, Mizoram, Nagaland and Sikkim to the Board of Control for Cricket in India (BCCI) ahead of the 2018–19 season, a new zone was required when zonal cricket returned in 2022–23. Therefore, North East Zone cricket was formed in August 2022 for both men's and women's cricket. In August 2022, BCCI announced that North East Zone would be one of the six zones to compete in the 2022–23 Duleep Trophy.

This was the first time that North East Zone participated in any competitive cricket tournament in India, with Hokaito Zhimomi being named as the captain. They played their inaugural first-class match on 8 September 2022 and drew the match against West Zone. However, they could not qualify for the semi-final because of West Zone's first innings lead.

They took part in the 2023 Deodhar Trophy, a List A cricket competition for the first time.

== Squad ==
| Name | Birth date | Batting Style | Bowling Style | State Team | Format | Notes |
Batsmen
| Rongsen Jonathan | 4 October 1986 (age 39) | Right-handed | Right-arm off break | Nagaland | First-class | Captain |
| Kishan Lyngdoh | 21 March 1998 (age 28) | Right-handed | Right-arm medium | Meghalaya | First-class | |
| Nilesh Lamichaney | 4 September 1991 (age 34) | Right-handed | Right-arm leg break | Sikkim | First-class & List A | |
| Langlonyamba Keishangbam | 6 December 1997 (age 28) | Right-handed | Right-arm leg break | Manipur | First-class & List A | Vice-captain |
| Joseph Lalthankhuma | 26 September 2000 (age 25) | Right-handed | Right-arm off break | Mizoram | First-class | |
| Anup Ahlawat | 13 November 2000 (age 25) | Right-handed | Right-arm medium | Arunachal Pradesh | First-class & List A | |
| Larry Sangma | 5 October 1992 (age 33) | Right-handed | Right-arm medium | Meghalaya | List A | |
| Jehu Anderson | 12 November 1999 (age 26) | Right-handed | | Mizoram | List A | |
All-rounders
| Palzor Tamang | 22 February 1993 (age 33) | Right-handed | Right-arm medium-fast | Sikkim | First-class & List A | |
| Lee Yong Lepcha | 7 November 1991 (age 34) | Right-handed | Right-arm off break | Sikkim | List A | |
| Priyojit Kangabam | 24 November 1994 (age 31) | Right-handed | Right-arm medium-fast | Manipur | List A | |
Wicket-keepers
| Prafullomani Pukhrambam | 1 March 1994 (age 32) | Right-handed | | Manipur | First-class | |
| Kamsha Yangfo | 16 November 1992 (age 33) | Right-handed | | Arunachal Pradesh | List A | |
| Ashish Thapa | 4 January 1994 (age 32) | Right-handed | | Sikkim | List A | |
Spin bowlers
| Kishan Singha | 23 December 1996 (age 29) | Right-handed | Slow left-arm orthodox | Manipur | First-class | |
| Imliwati Lemtur | 25 December 1991 (age 34) | Right-handed | Slow left-arm orthodox | Nagaland | First-class & List A | |
| Khrievitso Kense | 6 March 2004 (age 22) | Right-handed | Right-arm leg break | Sikkim | List A | |
Pace bowlers
| Dippu Sangma | 20 May 1997 (age 29) | Right-handed | Right-arm medium | Meghalaya | First-class | |
| Rex Rajkumar | 30 August 2000 (age 25) | Left-handed | Left-arm medium-fast | Manipur | First-class & List A | |
| Jotin Pheiroijam | 15 March 2006 (age 20) | Right-handed | Right-arm medium | Manipur | First-class | |
| Nagaho Chishi | 12 November 1997 (age 28) | Right-handed | Right-arm medium-fast | Nagaland | First-class | |
| Akash Choudhary | 28 November 1999 (age 26) | Right-handed | Right-arm medium | Meghalaya | First-class | |
| Nabam Abo | 5 October 1988 (age 37) | Right-handed | Right-arm medium-fast | Arunachal Pradesh | List A | |
| Abhishek Kumar | 4 May 2002 (age 24) | Right-handed | Right-arm medium-fast | Meghalaya | List A | |

Updated as on 26 Jul 2023

== Seasons ==
| Year | Position | |
| Year | Duleep Trophy | Deodhar Trophy |
|---|---|---|
| 2022–23 | Quarter-final (6th) | Did not held |
| 2023 | Quarter-final (6th) | TBD |
