= 2022–23 Ranji Trophy =

Cricket tournament

- The Ranji Trophy, awarded to the winners
- Dates: 13 December 2022 – 20 February 2023
- Administrator(s): BCCI
- Cricket format: First-class cricket
- Tournament format(s): Round-robin then knockout
- Host(s): India
- Champions: Saurashtra (2nd title)
- Runners-up: Bengal
- Participants: 38
- Matches: 138
- Player of the series: Arpit Vasavada (Saurashtra)
- Most runs: Mayank Agarwal (Karnataka) (990)
- Most wickets: Jalaj Saxena (Kerala) (50)

The 2022–23 Ranji Trophy was the 88th season of the Ranji Trophy, the premier first-class cricket tournament in India. It was played from 13 December 2022 and was finished on 19 February 2023. Madhya Pradesh were the defending champions, winning their first Ranji Trophy title previous season. (Note: Madhya Pradesh previously competed in the Ranji Trophy as Holkar cricket team, winning the tournament four times between 1945–46 and 1952–53. This was their first win as Madhya Pradesh.)

During this season, Sikkim hosted Ranji Trophy matches for the first time. Narayanan Janani, Vrinda Rathi and Gayathri Venugopalan became the first female umpires to officiate in the Ranji Trophy.

In the final, Saurashtra defeated Bengal by 9 wickets to win their second title.

== Format ==
Unlike the last season, where all teams competed for the same trophy, this season BCCI enforced the Promotion and relegation format. This Ranji trophy had two winners to improve the standard and competitiveness of the tournament. The teams were divided into two categories named as Elite category having 32 teams split into four groups, with Plate category having 6 teams. The Elite group teams played each other once, with the top two teams from each group qualified for the quarter-finals. In the Plate Group also teams played each other once, but the top four teams qualified for the plate group knockouts, with the bottom two teams playing for the fifth and sixth positions, and another playoff for the third and fourth positions took place. The two Plate finalists will be promoted to the Elite group for the next season, 2023–24, while the bottom two teams of all the four Elite groups combined - factoring in both points and the quotient will be relegated to Plate group.

The teams were placed in the following groups:

Group A	Group B	Group C	Group D	Plate Group
Baroda; Bengal; Haryana; Himachal Pradesh; Nagaland; Odisha; Uttar Pradesh; Uttarakhand	Andhra; Assam; Delhi; Hyderabad; Maharashtra; Mumbai; Saurashtra; Tamil Nadu	Chhattisgarh; Goa; Jharkhand; Karnataka; Kerala; Pondicherry; Rajasthan; Services	Chandigarh; Gujarat; Jammu & Kashmir; Madhya Pradesh; Punjab; Railways; Tripura; Vidarbha	Arunachal Pradesh; Bihar; Manipur; Meghalaya; Mizoram; Sikkim

== League stage ==
=== Group A ===
Pos	Team	Pld	W	L	T	D	NR	Pts	Quot
1	Bengal	7	4	1	0	2	0	32	1.573
2	Uttarakhand	7	3	0	0	4	0	29	1.365
3	Himachal Pradesh	7	2	1	0	4	0	21	1.459
4	Baroda	7	2	1	0	4	0	21	1.324
5	Odisha	7	1	2	0	4	0	14	0.846
6	Uttar Pradesh	7	1	2	0	4	0	13	0.980
7	Haryana	7	1	2	0	4	0	13	0.855
8	Nagaland	7	0	5	0	2	0	2	0.297

Updated to match(es) played on 27 January 2023. Source: ESPN Cricinfo

Advances to Quarter-final Relegated to Plate Group for next season

=== Group B ===
Pos	Team	Pld	W	L	T	D	NR	Pts	Quot
1	Saurashtra	7	3	2	0	2	0	26	1.277
2	Andhra	7	4	2	0	1	0	26	1.119
3	Maharashtra	7	3	0	0	4	0	26	1.345
4	Mumbai	7	3	2	0	2	0	24	1.533
5	Tamil Nadu	7	2	1	0	4	0	21	1.225
6	Delhi	7	2	2	0	3	0	17	0.902
7	Assam	7	1	3	0	3	0	11	0.546
8	Hyderabad	7	0	6	0	1	0	1	0.523

Updated to match(es) played on 27 January 2023. Source: ESPN Cricinfo

Advances to Quarter-final Relegated to Plate Group for next season

=== Group C ===
Pos	Team	Pld	W	L	T	D	NR	Pts	Quot
1	Karnataka	7	4	0	0	3	0	35	1.763
2	Jharkhand	7	3	2	0	2	0	23	1.102
3	Kerala	7	3	1	0	3	0	21	0.992
4	Rajasthan	7	2	2	0	3	0	20	1.118
5	Chhattisgarh	7	3	4	0	0	0	19	0.958
6	Goa	7	2	2	0	3	0	18	0.906
7	Services	7	2	4	0	1	0	13	0.753
8	Pondicherry	7	1	5	0	1	0	9	0.763

Updated to match(es) played on 27 January 2023. Source: ESPN Cricinfo

Advances to Quarter-final

=== Group D ===
Pos	Team	Pld	W	L	T	D	NR	Pts	Quot
1	Madhya Pradesh	7	5	1	0	1	0	33	1.414
2	Punjab	7	3	0	0	4	0	27	1.605
3	Railways	7	3	2	0	2	0	22	1.123
4	Vidarbha	7	3	2	0	2	0	20	1.197
5	Gujarat	7	2	4	0	1	0	14	0.899
6	Tripura	7	0	2	0	5	0	11	0.760
7	Jammu & Kashmir	7	1	4	0	2	0	8	0.768
8	Chandigarh	7	0	2	0	5	0	7	0.490

Updated to match(es) played on 27 January 2023. Source: ESPN Cricinfo

Advances to Quarter-final

=== Plate Group ===
Pos	Team	Pld	W	L	T	D	NR	Pts	Quot
1	Meghalaya	5	4	1	0	0	0	25	1.421
2	Sikkim	5	3	1	0	1	0	20	1.401
3	Manipur	5	3	1	0	1	0	20	1.253
4	Bihar	5	1	1	0	3	0	14	1.258
5	Mizoram	5	1	3	0	1	0	8	0.921
6	Arunachal Pradesh	5	0	5	0	0	0	0	0.353

Updated to match(es) played on 13 January 2023. Source: ESPN Cricinfo

Advances to Plate Semi-Final

== Plate Knockouts ==
17–19 January 2023
5th-Place Plate Play-offs
Scorecard

Arunachal Pradesh	v	Mizoram
199 (87.2 overs); Akhilesh Sahani 31* (28); Remruatdika Ralte 2/29 (12 overs)		485 (123 overs); Taruwar Kohli 144 (223); Akhilesh Sahani 5/91 (26.5 overs)
259 (61.3 overs); Rahul Dalal 107 (91); Avinash Yadav 6/99 (25.3 overs)

Mizoram won by an innings and 27 runs
Narendra Modi Stadium, Ahmedabad
Umpires: Navdeep Singh and KR Vasuki
Player of the match: Avinash Yadav (Mizoram)

- Arunachal Pradesh won the toss and elected to bat.
- Ajoy Sarkar (Arunachal Pradesh) and Lalrinchhana (Mizoram) both made their first-class debuts.

=== Plate Semi-finals ===
Plate Semi-finals
P4	Bihar	428 & 164
P1	Meghalaya	134 & 156
P2	Sikkim	229 & 273
P3	Manipur	166 & 340/8

Plate Final
P4	Bihar	546 & 335
P3	Manipur	337 & 324

17–21 January 2023
1st Plate Semi-final
Scorecard

Bihar	v	Meghalaya
428 (105.3 overs); Bipin Saurabh 177 (183); Arbin Singh 3/101 (30 overs)		134 (33.5 overs); Rajesh Bishnoi 40* (46); Ashutosh Aman 4/21 (11.5 overs)
164 (66.3 overs); Babul Kumar 51 (132); Rajesh Bishnoi 6/30 (25 overs)		156 (47.1 overs); Raj Biswa 28 (59); Ashutosh Aman 4/35 (8.1 overs)

Bihar won by 302 runs
Meghalaya Cricket Association Ground, Shillong
Umpires: Premdip Chatterjee and Vineet Kulkarni
Player of the match: Bipin Saurabh (Bihar)

- Meghalaya won the toss and elected to field.
- Nawaz Khan (Bihar) and Rohit Shah (Meghalaya) both made their first-class debuts.

17–21 January 2023
2nd Plate Semi-final
Scorecard

Sikkim	v	Manipur
229 (71.4 overs); Nilesh Lamichaney 83 (159); Pheiroijam Singh 4/33 (16 overs)		166 (63.4 overs); Basir Rahman 31 (95); Bijay Prasad 4/18 (10 overs)
273 (83.5 overs); Sumit Singh 168 (164); Pheiroijam Singh 5/62 (23.5 overs)		340/8 (96.3 overs); Basir Rahman 75 (135); Sumit Singh 6/60 (15.3 overs)

Manipur won by 2 wickets
Lalabhai Contractor Stadium, Surat
Umpires: Madanagopal Kuppuraj and Rohan Pandit
Player of the match: Sumit Singh (Sikkim)

- Manipur won the toss and elected to field.

=== Plate Final ===
25–29 January 2023
Plate Final
Scorecard

Bihar	v	Manipur
546 (124.4 overs); Sakibul Gani 205 (238); Kishan Singha 4/141 (39.4 overs)		337 (94.3 overs); Prafullomani Singh 82 (77); Nawaz Khan 5/82 (20 overs)
335 (102 overs); Sachin Kumar 132 (152); Kishan Singha 7/94 (43 overs)		324 (82.1 overs); Langlonyamba Keishangbam 117 (206); Nawaz Khan 5/95 (28 overs)

Bihar won by 220 runs
Moin-ul-Haq Stadium, Patna
Umpires: Nand Kishore and Krishnamachari Srinivasan
Player of the match: Sakibul Gani (Bihar)

- Bihar won the toss and elected to bat.
- Bihar and Manipur were promoted to the Elite group and will replace Nagaland and Hyderabad for the 2023–24 season

== Knockout stage ==
Quarter-finals
A1	Bengal	328 & 69/1
C2	Jharkhand	173 & 221
D1	Madhya Pradesh	228 & 245/5
B2	Andhra	379 & 93
B1	Saurashtra	303 & 379
D2	Punjab	431 & 180
C1	Karnataka	606
A2	Uttarakhand	116 & 209

Semi-finals
A1	Bengal	438 & 279
D1	Madhya Pradesh	170 & 241
B1	Saurashtra	527 & 117/6
C1	Karnataka	407 & 234

Final
A1	Bengal	174 & 241
B1	Saurashtra	404 & 14/1

=== Quarter-finals ===
31 January–4 February 2023
1st Quarter-final
Scorecard

Jharkhand	v	Bengal
173 (66.2 overs); Kumar Suraj 89* (175); Akash Deep 4/62 (21 overs)		328 (108 overs); Shahbaz Ahmed 81 (120); Ashish Kumar 3/89 (33 overs)
221 (63.5 overs); Aryaman Sen 64 (132); Akash Ghatak 3/21 (7.5 overs)		69/1 (12.4 overs); Abhimanyu Easwaran 28* (31); Rahul Shukla 1/24 (4 overs)

Bengal won by 9 wickets
Eden Gardens, Kolkata
Umpires: Vinod Seshan and Akshay Totre
Player of the match: Akash Deep (Bengal)

- Bengal won the toss and elected to field.

31 January–4 February 2023
2nd Quarter-final
Scorecard

Saurashtra	v	Punjab
303 (87 overs); Parth Bhut 111* (155); Mayank Markande 4/84 (29.2 overs)		431 (124.3 overs); Naman Dhir 131 (180); Dharmendrasinh Jadeja 5/109 (41.3 overs)
379 (120.1 overs); Prerak Mankad 88 (137); Vinay Choudhary 7/179 (49.1 overs)		180 (89.1 overs); Mandeep Singh 45 (128); Parth Bhut 5/89 (33 overs)

Saurashtra won by 71 runs
Saurashtra Cricket Association Stadium, Rajkot
Umpires: Saiyed Khalid and Nikhil Patwardhan
Player of the match: Parth Bhut (Saurashtra)

- Saurashtra won the toss and elected to bat.
- Pukhraj Mann (Punjab) made his first-class debut.

31 January–4 February 2023
3rd Quarter-final
Scorecard

Uttarakhand	v	Karnataka
116 (55.4 overs); Kunal Chandela 31 (103); M Venkatesh 5/36 (14 overs)		606 (162.5 overs); Shreyas Gopal 161* (288); Abhay Negi 4/109 (33.5 overs)
209 (73.4 overs); Swapnil Singh 51 (100); Shreyas Gopal 3/26 (12.4 overs)

Karnataka won by an innings and 281 runs
M. Chinnaswamy Stadium, Bengaluru
Umpires: Saidharshan Kumar and Nitin Pandit
Player of the match: Shreyas Gopal (Karnataka)

- Karnataka won the toss and elected to field.
- M Venkatesh (Karnataka) made his first-class debut.

31 January–4 February 2023
4th Quarter-final
Scorecard

Andhra	v	Madhya Pradesh
379 (127.1 overs); Ricky Bhui 149 (250); Anubhav Agarwal 4/72 (22 overs)		228 (69.1 overs); Shubham Sharma 51 (88); Prithvi Raj 5/26 (14.1 overs)
93 (32.3 overs); Ashwin Hebbar 35 (65); Avesh Khan 4/24 (10 overs)		245/5 (77 overs); Yash Dubey 58 (128); Prithvi Raj 2/50 (20 overs)

Madhya Pradesh won by 5 wickets
Holkar Stadium, Indore
Umpires: Rohan Pandit and Tapan Sharma
Player of the match: Prithvi Raj (Andhra)

- Madhya Pradesh won the toss and elected to field.

=== Semi-finals ===
8–12 February 2023
1st Semi-final
Scorecard

Bengal	v	Madhya Pradesh
438 (141.3 overs); Anustup Majumdar 120 (206); Kumar Kartikeya 3/95 (36.3 overs)		170 (79 overs); Saransh Jain 65 (169); Akash Deep 5/42 (18 overs)
279 (119.4 overs); Anustup Majumdar 80 (219); Saransh Jain 6/103 (42 overs)		241 (39.5 overs); Anubhav Agarwal 30* (12); Pradipta Pramanik 5/51 (10.5 overs)

Bengal won by 306 runs
Holkar Stadium, Indore
Umpires: Anil Chaudhary and Virender Sharma
Player of the match: Akash Deep (Bengal)

- Bengal won the toss and elected to bat.

8–12 February 2023
2nd Semi-final
Scorecard

Karnataka	v	Saurashtra
407 (133.3 overs); Mayank Agarwal 249 (429); Chetan Sakariya 3/73 (29 overs)		527 (174.4 overs); Arpit Vasavada 202 (406); Vidhwath Kaverappa 5/83 (35.4 overs)
234 (58.2 overs); Nikin Jose 109 (161); Chetan Sakariya 4/45 (11 overs)		117/6 (34.2 overs); Arpit Vasavada 47* (51); Vasuki Koushik 3/32 (10.2 overs)

Saurashtra won by 4 wickets
M. Chinnaswamy Stadium, Bengaluru
Umpires: Ulhas Gandhe and Sadashiv Iyer
Player of the match: Arpit Vasavada (Saurashtra)

- Saurashtra won the toss and elected to field.

=== Final ===
16–19 February 2023
Final
Scorecard

Bengal	v	Saurashtra
174 (54.1 overs); Shahbaz Ahmed 69 (112); Chetan Sakariya 3/33 (13 overs)		404 (110 overs); Arpit Vasavada 81 (156); Mukesh Kumar 4/111 (37 overs)
241 (53 overs); Manoj Tiwary 68 (154); Jaydev Unadkat 6/85 (22.4 overs)		14/1 (2.4 overs); Vishvaraj Jadeja 10* (7); Akash Deep 1/5 (1 over)

Saurashtra won by 9 wickets
Eden Gardens, Kolkata
Umpires: Jayaraman Madanagopal and Navdeep Singh
Player of the match: Jaydev Unadkat (Saurashtra)

- Saurashtra won the toss and elected to field.
- Sumanta Gupta (Bengal) made his first-class debut.

== Statistics ==
- On 2 January, Saurashtra bowler Jaydev Unadkat became the first player to take a hat-trick in the first over of a Ranji Trophy match.
- On 12 January, Mumbai batter Prithvi Shaw made second highest score in an inning in Ranji history by a batter. He scored 379 runs.
- On 19 January, Vidarbha defended a target of 73 runs against Gujarat, which is the lowest target defended in the Ranji Trophy.
