= 2023 Duleep Trophy =

Cricket tournament

- Dates: 28 June – 16 July 2023
- Administrator: Board of Control for Cricket in India
- Cricket format: First-class
- Tournament format: Knockout
- Host: India
- Champions: South Zone (14th title)
- Runners-up: West Zone
- Participants: 6
- Matches: 5
- Player of the series: Vidwath Kaverappa (South Zone)
- Most runs: Prabhsimran Singh (North Zone) (202)
- Most wickets: Saurabh Kumar (Central Zone) (16)

The 2023 Duleep Trophy was the 60th edition of the Duleep Trophy, a domestic first-class cricket competition that was played in India. It took place from 28 June to 16 July 2023. The tournament was played across six zones, forming part of the 2023 Indian domestic cricket season, announced by the Board of Control for Cricket in India (BCCI) in April 2023. West Zone were the defending champions. In the final, South Zone defeated West Zone by 75 runs to win their 14th title.

== Squads ==
The squads for all the teams was announced by BCCI on 20 June 2023.

| Central Zone | East Zone | North Zone | North East Zone | South Zone | West Zone |
|---|---|---|---|---|---|
| Shivam Mavi (c); Upendra Yadav (vc, wk); Kunal Chandela; Saransh Jain; Dhruv Jurel; Avesh Khan; Amandeep Khare; Saurabh Kumar; Himanshu Mantri; Shubham Sharma; Rinku Singh; Vivek Singh; Manav Suthar; Yash Thakur; Akshay Wadkar | Abhimanyu Easwaran (c); Shahbaz Nadeem (vc); Shahbaz Ahmed; Akash Deep; Sudip Kumar Gharami; Mukesh Kumar; Kumar Kushagra (wk); Anustup Majumdar; Shantanu Mishra; Manisankar Murasingh; Riyan Parag; Abhishek Porel (wk); Ishan Porel; Anukul Roy; Bipin Saurabh | Jayant Yadav (c); Vaibhav Arora; Prashant Chopra; Abid Mushtaq; Pulkit Narang; Ankit Kalsi; Siddarth Kaul; Ankit Kumar; Harshit Rana; Nishant Sindhu; Baltej Singh; Prabhsimran Singh (wk); Dhruv Shorey; Manan Vohra; Nehal Wadhera | Rongsen Jonathan (c); Nilesh Lamichaney (vc); Anup Ahlawat; Nagaho Chishi; Akash Choudhary; Langlonyamba Keishangbam; Joseph Lalthankhuma; Imliwati Lemtur; Kishan Lyngdoh; Jotin Pheiroijam; Rex Rajkumar; Dippu Sangma; Prafullomani Singh (wk); Kishan Singha; Palzor Tamang | Hanuma Vihari (c); Mayank Agarwal (vc); Sachin Baby; Ricky Bhui (wk); Narayan Jagadeesan (wk); Darshan Misal; Vidwath Kaverappa; Sai Kishore; Vasuki Koushik; Suyash Prabhudessai; Pradosh Ranjan Paul; Ravikumar Samarth; K. V. Sasikanth; Sai Sudharsan; Washington Sundar; Tilak Varma; Vijaykumar Vyshak | Priyank Panchal (c); Harvik Desai (wk); Tushar Deshpande; Yuvrajsinh Dodiya; Chintan Gaja; Dharmendrasinh Jadeja; Kedar Jadhav; Sarfaraz Khan; Shams Mulani; Arzan Nagwaswalla; Het Patel (wk); Cheteshwar Pujara; Prithvi Shaw; Atit Sheth; Arpit Vasavada; Suryakumar Yadav |

== Fixtures ==
=== Bracket ===
Quarter-finals
Central Zone | 182 & 239
East Zone | 122 & 129
North Zone | 540/8d & 259/6d
North East Zone | 134 & 154

Semi-finals
West Zone | 220 & 297
Central Zone | 128 & 128/4
South Zone | 195 & 219/8
North Zone | 198 & 211

Final
West Zone | 146 & 222
South Zone | 213 & 230

=== Quarter-finals ===
28 June–1 July 2023
Scorecard

| Central Zone | v | East Zone |
| 182 (71.4 overs); Rinku Singh 38 (58); Manisankar Murasingh 5/42 (20 overs) | | 122 (42.2 overs); Riyan Parag 33 (46); Avesh Khan 3/34 (13 overs) |
| 239 (87.5 overs); Himanshu Mantri 68 (153); Ishan Porel 3/15 (12 overs) | | 129 (41.2 overs); Akash Deep 24 (14); Saurabh Kumar 8/64 (18.2 overs) |

Central Zone won by 170 runs
KSCA Cricket Ground, Alur
Umpires: Anil Chaudhary and Mohit Krishnadas
Player of the match: Saurabh Kumar (Central Zone)

- Central Zone won the toss and elected to bat.

28 June–1 July 2023
Scorecard

| North Zone | v | North East Zone |
| 540/8d (136 overs); Nishant Sindhu 150 (245); Kishan Singha 2/74 (17 overs) | | 134 (39.2 overs); Nilesh Lamichaney 44 (77); Siddarth Kaul 3/16 (8 overs) |
| 259/6d (55.1 overs); Ankit Kalsi 70 (101); Pheiroijam Jotin 2/44 (8 overs) | | 154 (47.5 overs); Palzor Tamang 40 (82); Pulkit Narang 4/43 (13.5 overs) |

North Zone won by 511 runs
M. Chinnaswamy Stadium, Bengaluru
Umpires: Pranav Joshi and Nikhil Patwardhan
Player of the match: Nishant Sindhu (North Zone)

- North East Zone won the toss and elected to field.

=== Semi-finals ===
5–8 July 2023
Scorecard

| West Zone | v | Central Zone |
| 220 (92.5 overs); Atit Sheth 74 (129); Shivam Mavi 6/44 (19.5 overs) | | 128 (31.3 overs); Rinku Singh 48 (69); Arzan Nagwaswalla 5/74 (14.3 overs) |
| 297 (93.2 overs); Cheteshwar Pujara 133 (278); Saransh Jain 4/56 (28.2 overs) | | 128/4 (35 overs); Rinku Singh 40 (30); Yuvrajsinh Dodiya 1/16 (4 overs) |

Match drawn
KSCA Cricket Ground, Alur
Umpires: Abhijit Bengeri and Saiyed Khalid
Player of the match: Atit Sheth (West Zone)

- West Zone won the toss and elected to bat.

5–8 July 2023
Scorecard

| North Zone | v | South Zone |
| 198 (58.3 overs); Prabhsimran Singh 49 (52); Vidwath Kaverappa 5/28 (17.3 overs) | | 195 (54.4 overs); Mayank Agarwal 76 (115); Jayant Yadav 3/38 (11.4 overs) |
| 211 (56.4 overs); Prabhsimran Singh 63 (93); Vijaykumar Vyshak 5/76 (15 overs) | | 219/8 (36.1 overs); Mayank Agarwal 54 (57); Harshit Rana 3/84 (13 overs) |

South Zone won by 2 wickets
M. Chinnaswamy Stadium, Bengaluru
Umpires: Ulhas Gandhe and Rohan Pandit
Player of the match: Mayank Agarwal (South Zone)

- South Zone won the toss and elected to field.

=== Final ===
12–16 July 2023
Scorecard

| South Zone | v | West Zone |
| 213 (78.4 overs); Hanuma Vihari 63 (130); Shams Mulani 3/29 (8 overs) | | 146 (51 overs); Prithvi Shaw 65 (101); Vidwath Kaverappa 7/53 (19 overs) |
| 230 (81.1 overs); Hanuma Vihari 42 (89); Dharmendrasinh Jadeja 5/40 (22.1 overs) | | 222 (84.2 overs); Priyank Panchal 95 (211); Vasuki Koushik 4/36 (25 overs) |

South Zone won by 75 runs
M. Chinnaswamy Stadium, Bengaluru
Umpires: Anil Chaudhary and Akshay Totre
Player of the match: Vidwath Kaverappa (South Zone)

- West Zone won the toss and elected to field.
