= 2018–19 Syed Mushtaq Ali Trophy Group C =

Cricket tournament

- Dates: 21 February – 2 March 2019
- Administrator(s): BCCI
- Cricket format: Twenty20 cricket
- Tournament format(s): Round-robin and Playoff format
- Participants: 7

The 2018–19 Syed Mushtaq Ali Trophy was the tenth season of the Syed Mushtaq Ali Trophy, a Twenty20 cricket tournament in India. It was contested by the 37 domestic cricket teams of India, with seven teams in Group C. The group stage started on 21 February 2019, with the top two teams progressing to the Super League section of the competition.

Railways won the group, with Mumbai finishing second to progress to the Super League phase of the tournament.

== Points table ==
Team	Pld	W	L	T	NR	Pts	NRR
Railways	6	5	1	0	0	20	+1.256
Mumbai	6	5	1	0	0	20	+1.590
Saurashtra	6	4	2	0	0	16	+1.241
Madhya Pradesh (H)	6	3	3	0	0	12	+0.179
Punjab	6	3	3	0	0	12	+0.590
Goa	6	1	5	0	0	4	–0.802
Sikkim	6	0	6	0	0	0	–4.466

- Top two teams advanced to the Super League.

(H)- Host

== Fixtures ==
=== Round 1 ===
21 February 2019
Scorecard

Saurashtra; 188/3 (20 overs)	v	Railways; 190/5 (19.4 overs)
Cheteshwar Pujara 100* (61); Ashish Yadav 1/30 (4 overs)		Mrunal Devdhar 49 (20); Dharmendrasinh Jadeja 2/27 (4 overs)

Railways won by 5 wickets
Holkar Cricket Stadium, Indore
Umpires: Sai Darshan Kumar and Sanjay Hazare

- Railways won the toss and elected to field.
- Abhinav Dixit, Harsh Tyagi, Pratham Singh (Railways), Harvik Desai and Chetan Sakariya (Saurashtra) all made their T20 debuts.
- Cheteshwar Pujara scored his first T20 century and became the first batsman for Saurashtra to score a century in a T20 match.

21 February 2019
Scorecard

Mumbai; 258/4 (20 overs)	v	Sikkim; 104/7 (20 overs)
Shreyas Iyer 147 (55); Milind Kumar 2/30 (4 overs)		Bipul Sharma 32 (20); Shams Mulani 2/2 (3 overs)

Mumbai won by 154 runs
Emerald High School Ground, Indore
Umpires: Krishnaraj Srinath and Tapan Sharma

- Mumbai won the toss and elected to bat.
- Palzor Tamang, Amos Rai, Bibek Diyali, Tashi Bhalla, Nilesh Lamichaney, Lee Yong Lepcha, KN Luitel and Ashish Thapa (Sikkim) all made their T20 debuts.
- Shreyas Iyer (Mumbai) made the highest total by an Indian batsman in a T20 match.

21 February 2019
Scorecard

Madhya Pradesh; 199/4 (20 overs)	v	Punjab; 165/9 (20 overs)
Parth Sahani 90 (50); Manpreet Gony 2/34 (4 overs)		Mandeep Singh 64 (38); Ishwar Pandey 3/17 (4 overs)

Madhya Pradesh won by 34 runs
Holkar Cricket Stadium, Indore
Umpires: Sai Darshan Kumar and Sanjay Hazare

- Madhya Pradesh won the toss and elected to bat.
- Abhishek Bhandari (Madhya Pradesh) and Prabhsimran Singh (Punjab) both made their T20 debuts.

=== Round 2 ===
22 February 2019
Scorecard

Sikkim; 100/8 (20 overs)	v	Goa; 104/2 (14 overs)
Bibek Diyali 22 (24); Lakshay Garg 3/14 (4 overs)		Sagun Kamat 50* (39); KN Luitel 1/16 (2 overs)

Goa won by 8 wickets
Holkar Cricket Stadium, Indore
Umpires: Krishnaraj Srinath and Sai Darshan Kumar

- Sikkim won the toss and elected to bat
- Mandup Bhutia (Sikkim) and Suyash Prabhudessai (Goa) both made their T20 debuts.

22 February 2019
Scorecard

Mumbai; 155 (20 overs)	v	Punjab; 120 (18.2 overs)
Suryakumar Yadav 80 (49); Baltej Singh 3/30 (4 overs)		Simran Singh 54 (20); Dhawal Kulkarni 4/22 (3.2 overs)

Mumbai won by 35 runs
Emerald High School Ground, Indore
Umpires: Sanjay Hazare and Tapan Sharma

- Punjab won the toss and elected to field.

22 February 2019
Scorecard

Madhya Pradesh; 138 (20 overs)	v	Saurashtra; 139/4 (16.5 overs)
Parth Sahani 49 (44); Chetan Sakariya 4/38 (4 overs)		Cheteshwar Pujara 68 (46); Ishwar Pandey 2/26 (4 overs)

Saurashtra won by 6 wickets
Holkar Cricket Stadium, Indore
Umpires: Krishnaraj Srinath and Sai Darshan Kumar

- Saurashtra won the toss and elected to field.

=== Round 3 ===
24 February 2019
Scorecard

Punjab; 122 (20 overs)	v	Saurashtra; 126/2 (17.4 overs)
Yuvraj Singh 34 (31); Jaydev Unadkat 3/30 (4 overs)		Robin Uthappa 54 (44); Mandeep Singh 1/4 (1 over)

Saurashtra won by 8 wickets
Emerald High School Ground, Indore
Umpires: Krishnaraj Srinath and Tapan Sharma

- Jay Chauhan (Saurashtra) made his T20 debut.

24 February 2019
Scorecard

Goa; 164/7 (20 overs)	v	Railways; 168/2 (17.3 overs)
Suyash Prabhudessai 49 (24); Prashant Awasthi 2/14 (3 overs)		Mrunal Devdhar 82 (44); Darshan Misal 1/20 (2.3 overs)

Railways won by 8 wickets
Holkar Cricket Stadium, Indore
Umpires: Sai Darshan Kumar and Sanjay Hazare

- Railways won the toss and elected to field.

24 February 2019
Scorecard

Madhya Pradesh; 143 (19.3 overs)	v	Mumbai; 145/2 (16 overs)
Rajat Patidar 47 (37); Tushar Deshpande 4/28 (4 overs)		Shreyas Iyer 103* (55); Kuldeep Sen 1/22 (3 overs)

Mumbai won by 8 wickets
Holkar Cricket Stadium, Indore
Umpires: Sai Darshan Kumar and Sanjay Hazare

- Madhya Pradesh won the toss and elected to bat.
- Rishabh Chouhan and Kuldeep Sen (Madhya Pradesh) both made their T20 debuts.

=== Round 4 ===
25 February 2019
Scorecard

Sikkim; 75 (18 overs)	v	Saurashtra; 79/3 (8.3 overs)
Milind Kumar 28 (27); Jaydev Unadkat 2/9 (3 overs)		Cheteshwar Pujara 39* (22); Bipul Sharma 3/23 (4 overs)

Saurashtra won by 7 wickets
Holkar Cricket Stadium, Indore
Umpires: Sai Darshan Kumar and Tapan Sharma

- Sikkim won the toss and elected to bat.

25 February 2019
Scorecard

Madhya Pradesh; 159/6 (20 overs)	v	Railways; 161/5 (19.4 overs)
Naman Ojha 74 (45); Amit Mishra 3/19 (4 overs)		Pratham Singh 61 (36); Mihir Hirwani 3/20 (4 overs)

Railways won by 5 wickets
Holkar Cricket Stadium, Indore
Umpires: Sai Darshan Kumar and Tapan Sharma

- Railways won the toss and elected to field.

25 February 2019
Scorecard

Goa; 140/4 (20 overs)	v	Mumbai; 141/4 (18.2 overs)
Amogh Sunil Desai 38 (24); Shubham Ranjane 1/19 (3 overs)		Prithvi Shaw 71 (47); Vijesh Prabhudessai 1/11 (1 over)

Mumbai won by 6 wickets
Emerald High School Ground, Indore
Umpires: Krishnaraj Srinath and Sanjay Hazare

- Goa won the toss and elected to bat.

=== Round 5 ===
27 February 2019
Scorecard

Railways; 175/5 (20 overs)	v	Mumbai; 118 (18.1 overs)
Pratham Singh 89 (60); Tushar Deshpande 3/44 (4 overs)		Suryakumar Yadav 38 (33); Ashish Yadav 4/32 (4 overs)

Railways won by 57 runs
Emerald High School Ground, Indore
Umpires: Sai Darshan Kumar and Tapan Sharma

- Mumbai won the toss and elected to field.

27 February 2019
Scorecard

Sikkim; 90/8 (20 overs)	v	Punjab; 95/1 (10.5 overs)
Milind Kumar 37 (34); Baltej Singh 2/13 (4 overs)		Shubman Gill 70* (40); Bipul Sharma 1/18 (4 overs)

Punjab won by 9 wickets
Holkar Cricket Stadium, Indore
Umpires: Krishnaraj Srinath and Sanjay Hazare

- Sikkim won the toss and elected to bat.
- Karan Kaila and Krishan Alang (Punjab) both made their T20 debuts.

27 February 2019
Scorecard

Goa; 196/3 (20 overs)	v	Madhya Pradesh; 197/6 (19.4 overs)
Amit Verma 109* (56); Ishwar Pandey 2/26 (4 overs)		Parth Sahani 68 (39); Felix Alemao 2/25 (3 overs)

Madhya Pradesh won by 4 wickets
Emerald High School Ground, Indore
Umpires: Sai Darshan Kumar and Tapan Sharma

- Goa won the toss and elected to bat.
- Malliksab Sirur (Goa) made his T20 debut.

=== Round 6 ===
28 February 2019
Scorecard

Sikkim; 109/5 (20 overs)	v	Railways; 113/1 (13.1 overs)
Milind Kumar 54 (39); Manjeet Singh 2/17 (4 overs)		Pratham Singh 53* (40); Ishwar Chaudhary 1/23 (3 overs)

Railways won by 9 wickets
Emerald High School Ground, Indore
Umpires: Sanjay Hazare and Tapan Sharma

- Railways won the toss and elected to field.
- Rinzing Bhutia and Karma Bhutia (Sikkim) both made their T20 debuts.

28 February 2019
Scorecard

Punjab; 205/7 (20 overs)	v	Goa; 126 (18 overs)
Manan Vohra 87 (48); Malliksab Sirur 2/31 (4 overs)		Amogh Sunil Desai 35 (27); Krishan 4/26 (4 overs)

Punjab won by 79 runs
Emerald High School Ground, Indore
Umpires: Sanjay Hazare and Tapan Sharma

- Punjab won the toss and elected to bat.

28 February 2019
Scorecard

Mumbai; 147 (20 overs)	v	Saurashtra; 139 (19.5 overs)
Prithvi Shaw 36 (17); Prerak Mankad 3/27 (4 overs)		Robin Uthappa 57 (41); Shardul Thakur 3/30 (4 overs)

Mumbai won by 8 runs
Holkar Cricket Stadium, Indore
Umpires: Krishnaraj Srinath and Sai Darshan Kumar

- Saurashtra won the toss and elected to field.

=== Round 7 ===
2 March 2019
Scorecard

Madhya Pradesh; 164/8 (20 overs)	v	Sikkim; 114 (20 overs)
Abhishek Bhandari 46 (27); Ishwar Chaudhary 3/24 (4 overs)		Bipul Sharma 24 (15); Kumar Kartikeya 3/10 (4 overs)

Madhya Pradesh won by 50 runs
Emerald High School Ground, Indore
Umpires: Krishnaraj Srinath and Sai Darshan Kumar

- Madhya Pradesh won the toss and elected to bat.
- Kumar Kartikeya (Madhya Pradesh) and Pritam Nirala (Sikkim) both made their T20 debuts.

2 March 2019
Scorecard

Railways; 149/5 (20 overs)	v	Punjab; 152/7 (19.5 overs)
Prashant Gupta 53 (42); Krishan 1/29 (3 overs)		Mandeep Singh 70* (48); Anureet Singh 3/52 (4 overs)

Punjab won by 3 wickets
Holkar Cricket Stadium, Indore
Umpires: Sanjay Hazare and Tapan Sharma

- Railways won the toss and elected to bat.

2 March 2019
Scorecard

Goa; 99 (17.5 overs)	v	Saurashtra; 100/5 (17.2 overs)
Vaibhav Govekar 32 (19); Jaydev Unadkat 2/22 (3 overs)		Sheldon Jackson 36 (32); Darshan Misal 2/25 (4 overs)

Saurashtra won by 5 wickets
Emerald High School Ground, Indore
Umpires: Krishnaraj Srinath and Sai Darshan Kumar

- Goa won the toss and elected to bat.
- Vaibhav Govekar (Goa) made his T20 debut.
