= Luitel =

Surname List

Luitel or Luintel (Nepali: लुईँटेल/लुइटेल) is a surname most commonly found in Nepal and Northeast India. Luitel is a toponymic family name from Luyati gaun (Luyati village).

Notable people with the surname include:

- Jaya Luintel, Nepali journalist
- Jiwan Luitel, Nepalese actor
- Khara Nanda Luitel, Indian cricketer
