= Khwairakpam =

Khwairakpam is a Meitei family name. Notable people with the surname include:

- Khwairakpam Bishwamittra, Indian film director, actor and script writer
- Khwairakpam Chaoba (1895–1950), Indian poet, essayist, and novelist
- Khwairakpam Diya (1967–2025), Indian film actor, director and producer
- Khwairakpam Loken Singh, Indian politician
- Ulenyai Khwairakpam (born 2003), Indian cricketer
