= Sumit Singh =

Sumit Singh may refer to:

- Sumit Singh (businessman)
- Sumit Singh (cricketer)
