= Nehal Wadhera =

Indian cricketer (born 2000)

Personal information
- Born: 4 September 2000 (age 26); Ludhiana, Punjab, India
- Batting: Left-handed
- Bowling: Right-arm Legbreak
- Role: Top order batter

Domestic team information
- Years: Team
- 2023–2026: Punjab
- 2023–2024: Mumbai Indians
- 2025–present: Punjab Kings
- 2026–present: Himachal Pradesh

Career statistics
Competition	FC	LA	T20
Matches	16	14	61
Runs scored	890	298	1,159
Batting average	40.45	29.80	26.34
100s/50s	3/2	0/1	0/6
Top score	214	57	70
Catches/stumpings	11/0	4/0	21/0
Medal record
Men's cricket
Representing India
ACC U19 Asia Cup
Winner	2018 Bangladesh
Winner	2019 Sri Lanka
- Source: ESPNcricinfo, 3 January 2026

Nehal Wadhera (born 4 September 2000) is an Indian cricketer. He is a left-handed batsman and an occasional legbreak bowler. He plays for Himachal Pradesh cricket team in domestic and Punjab Kings in the Indian Premier League.

== Early life ==
Wadhera was born in Ludhiana, a city in Punjab. He first started playing cricket at the age of nine. Initially, he used to play as a specialist batsman and put in long hours to work on his fitness. He is often referred to by his nickname "new-age Yuvraj Singh" for his middle-order performances and similarity in batting style with Yuvraj Singh. He started playing cricket under the guidance of his childhood coach Charanjit Bhangu. He was coached by Harjinder Singh in age level cricket, who saw "glimpses of Yuvraj" on him. He received his coaching at the Ludhiana District Cricket Association, and was graduated from Satish Chander Dhawan Government College.

== Youth career ==
He played for Punjab under-16 and under-19 cricket teams in Vijay Merchant Trophy and Cooch Behar Trophy from 2015 to 2018, with 529 runs in the 2017–18 season. He was then selected to play for different tiers of India under-19 cricket team. He made his under-19 debut for India on 17 July 2018, against Sri Lanka in a four-day match and scored 82 runs. He also became the third cricketer from Ludhiana to play for India at any level. In August 2018, he was named in India's squad for the 2016 ACC Under-19 Asia Cup.

In April 2022, during the semi-final of Inter-District U-23 Cricket Championship, he smashed 578 runs in an innings, surpassing Brian Lara's record of highest score in an innings in a four-day match. He also became the fastest player to reach 200, 300, 400 and 500 runs in any level of recognized cricket, and was honoured by Junior Chamber International for his record.

== Domestic career ==
In December 2020, Wadhera was named in Punjab's squad for the 2020–21 Syed Mushtaq Ali Trophy. In December 2022, he was bought by the Mumbai Indians at a price of ₹20 lakh, to play for them in the Indian Premier League. He became the third player from Ludhiana district to get IPL call-up.

In January 2023, he was selected to play for Punjab in the 2022–23 Ranji Trophy. He made his first-class debut for Punjab on 3 January 2023, against Gujarat. He made a match-winning century in his debut match, scoring 123 runs guiding Punjab to a 380-run victory. He struck his maiden double hundred in his just third first-class game, scoring 214 runs against Madhya Pradesh on 18 January 2023. He won the player of the match award, and finished his maiden first-class season with 376 runs from seven innings.

He made his Twenty20 debut for Mumbai Indians on 2 April 2023, against Royal Challengers Bangalore in the 2023 Indian Premier League. He impressed on his debut match, scoring a quick fire 21 runs off 13 balls including two sixes. On 6 May 2023, he scored his maiden IPL half-century against the Chennai Super Kings. He scored 241 runs from 14 innings in that IPL season. In June 2023, he was replaced by Jayant Yadav, to play for North Zone in the 2023 Duleep Trophy. He made his List A debut for Punjab on 23 November 2023, against Baroda in the 2023–24 Vijay Hazare Trophy. He played an integral part for Punjab Kings in the 2025 Indian Premier League season, being their fourth highest run scorer with 369 runs in 15 matches, with notable knocks versus Lucknow Super Giants, Royal Challengers Bengaluru, Rajasthan Royals, and most crucially versus former franchise Mumbai Indians in Qualifier 2. However, his form tapered off in the domestic season after the 2025 Indian Premier League final, leading him to be dropped from the Punjab cricket team (India) from all formats. After the end of a dismal 2026 Indian Premier League season, with the only notable knock being a quickfire cameo versus the Delhi Capitals, Wadhera joined the Himachal Pradesh cricket team, who undperformed in the past season.

== International career ==
In July 2023, he was named in India A's squad as a standby player for the 2023 ACC Emerging Teams Asia Cup.
