= Nitesh Sedai =

Indian cricketer (born 1998)

Personal information
- Full name: Nitesh Sedai
- Born: 8 February 1998 (age 28); Kangpokpi, Manipur, India
- Source: ESPNcricinfo, 8 November 2019

Nitesh Sedai (born 8 February 1998) is an Indian cricketer. He made his Twenty20 debut on 8 November 2019, for Manipur in the 2019–20 Syed Mushtaq Ali Trophy. He made his List A debut on 21 February 2021, for Manipur in the 2020–21 Vijay Hazare Trophy. He made his first-class debut on 24 February 2022, for Manipur in the 2021–22 Ranji Trophy.
