= Sylvester Mylliempdah =

Indian cricketer (born 1992)

Personal information
- Full name: Sylvester Mylliempdah
- Born: 16 September 1992 (age 34)
- Batting: Right-handed
- Bowling: Right-arm offbreak

Domestic team information
- Years: Team
- 2018/19: Meghalaya
- Source: Cricinfo, 21 September 2018

Sylvester Mylliempdah (born 16 September 1992) is an Indian cricketer. He made his List A debut for Meghalaya in the 2018–19 Vijay Hazare Trophy on 21 September 2018. He made his first-class debut for Meghalaya in the 2018–19 Ranji Trophy on 12 November 2018.
