= Raghuvendra Pratap Singh =

Indian cricketer

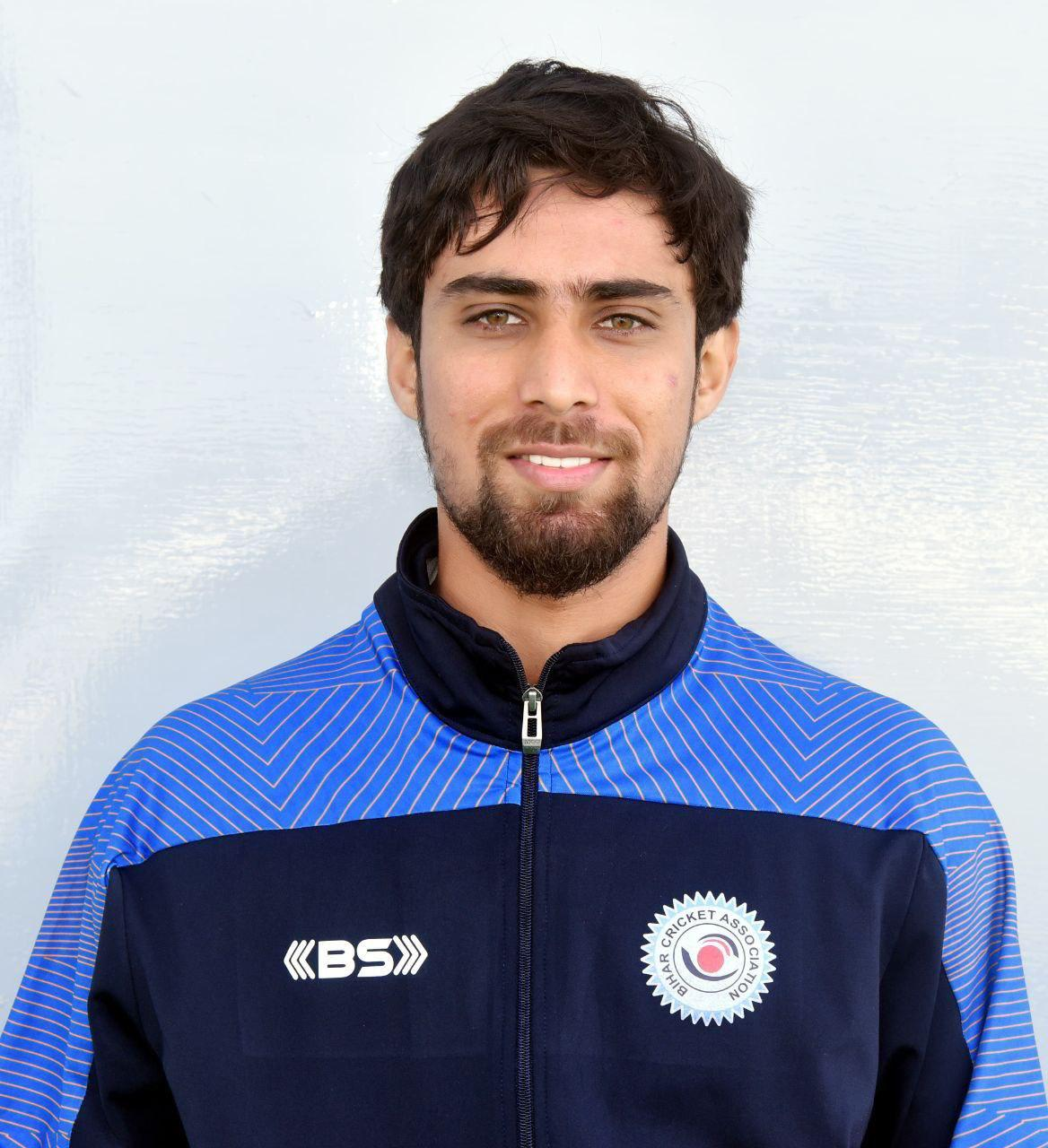

Personal information
- Born: 1 August 2003 (age 23); Banka, Bihar
- Batting: Right-handed
- Bowling: Right-arm medium-fast
- Role: All-rounder

Raghuvendra Pratap Singh (born 1 August 2003) is an Indian cricketer who represents Bihar in domestic cricket. He made his Twenty20 debut on 12 October 2022, for Bihar, in the Syed Mushtaq Ali Trophy 2022-23. He made his List A debut in the 2022-23 Vijay Hazare Trophy on 15 November 2022. Subsequently, he made his First Class debut, for Bihar, in the 2022-23 Ranji Trophy on 27 December 2022.

On 26 December 2024, in the Vijay Hazare Trophy 2024-25 match against Delhi, Raghuvendra won the Player of the Match award, scoring 52 runs (not out) and taking 2 wickets.

== Early life ==
He was born on 1 August 2003 in the Banka district of the Indian state of Bihar, where he studied till 9th class and practiced music till the age of 14. His father, Santosh Kumar, is a sports teacher at High School, Shambhuganj. Later, he went to Patna with his uncle Anish Kumar, where he chose to pursue a career in cricket.
