= Pringsang Sangma =

Indian cricketer (born 1995)

Personal information
- Born: 14 February 1995 (age 31); Tura, Meghalaya
- Source: Cricinfo, 27 January 2020

Pringsang Sangma (born 14 February 1995) is an Indian cricketer. He made his first-class debut on 27 January 2020, for Meghalaya in the 2019–20 Ranji Trophy.
