= Ankur Malik =

Indian cricketer

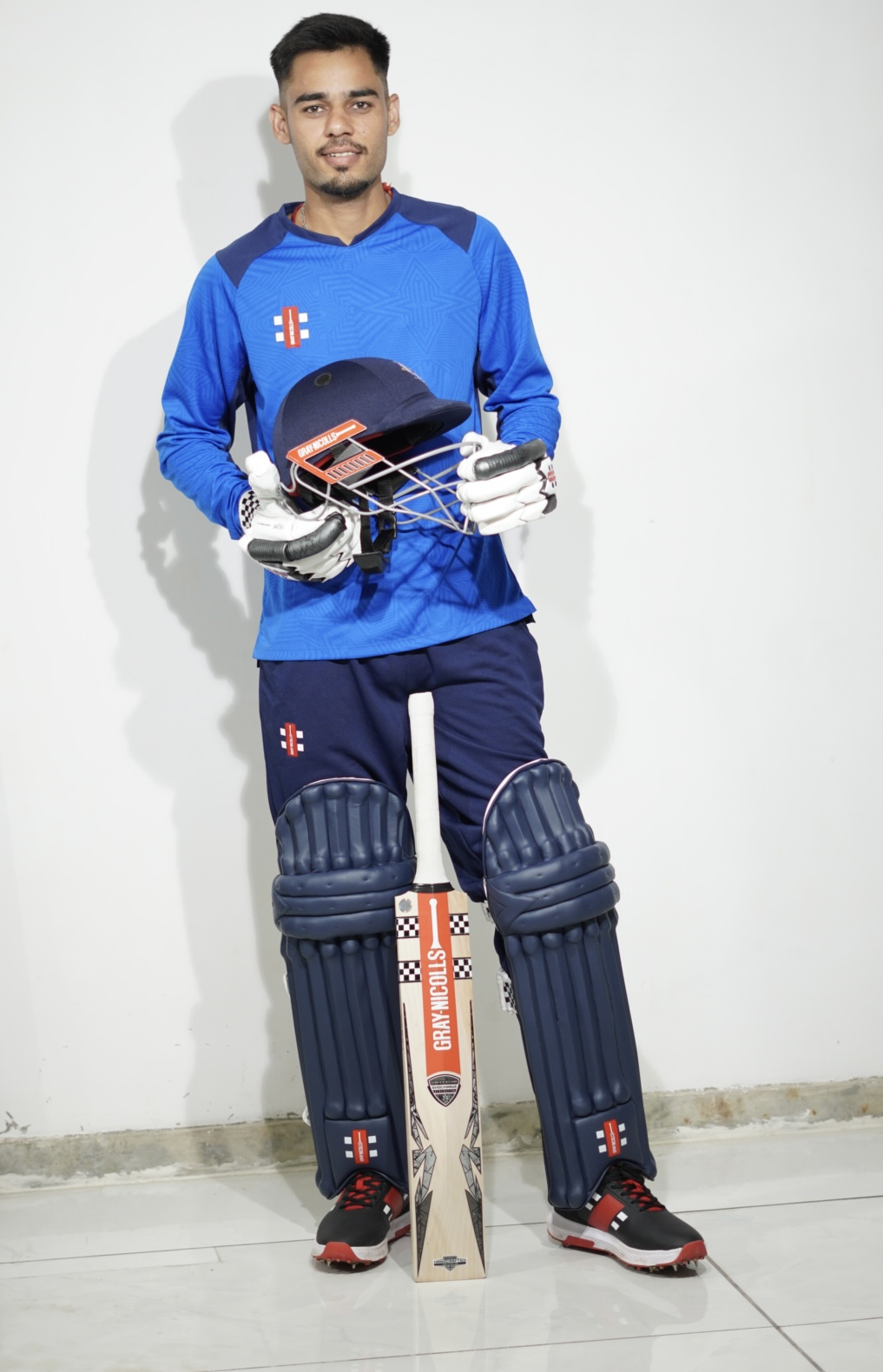

Personal information
- Full name: Ankur Malik
- Born: November 5, 2003 (age 22)
- Batting: Right-handed
- Bowling: Right-arm offbreak
- Role: All-rounder

Domestic team information
- Years: Team
- 2022–present: Sikkim
- 2022–present: North East Zone
- 2023–present: Northop Hall
- Source: ESPNcricinfo

Ankur Malik is an Indian cricketer who represents Sikkim in domestic cricket. Malik is known for his versatile performances as an all-rounder, contributing significantly with both bat and ball in various competitions.

== Early life and background ==
Ankur Malik born (5 November 2003) is an Indian Cricketer. He gained recognition after being selected for the Men’s Under-19 One-Day Challenger Trophy.

== Career ==
Ankur Malik represents Sikkim in domestic cricket. He achieved a rare feat by becoming the first player from Sikkim to score a century and take five wickets in a single match, highlighting his ability as an all-rounder.

Malik was also selected to represent the North East Zone in the Duleep Trophy. During the competition, he delivered a notable performance on Day 3, showcasing his contribution to the team.

In the 2024-25 Vijay Hazare Trophy, Malik played a crucial role in Sikkim’s historic win against Rajasthan, helping chase a target of 276 runs.

In another match, he was named Player of the Match for scoring 37 runs* and taking 4/35, leading Sikkim to a 6-run victory over Rajasthan.

During the 2024–25 Ranji Trophy, Malik was part of the Sikkim team that defeated Arunachal Pradesh by 104 runs, marking their second win in the tournament.

In addition to his performances in Indian domestic cricket, Malik played for Northop Hall in the Liverpool Competition in England. His standout bowling performance against Prestatyn was a highlight of his stint in club cricket.
