= Sunil Lachit =

Indian cricketer (born 1999)

Sachin Lachit
Personal information
- Born: 6 December 1999 (age 26)
- Batting: Right-handed
- Bowling: Left-arm medium fast
- Role: Bowler

Domestic team information
- Years: Team
- 2022–present: Assam

Sunil Girik Lachit (born 6 December 1999) is an Indian cricketer He made his first-class debut on 13 December 2022, for Assam in the 2022-23 Ranji Trophy.

== Career ==
He made his List A debut on 15 November 2022 against Meghalaya at Kolkata. In December 2022, he was selected in Assam's 15-member squad for the 2022-23 Ranji Trophy. He made his first-class debut against Saurashtra at Guwahati in the Group-B fixture of the 2022-23 Ranji Trophy. In the following year, he was again selected to play in the 2023-24 Ranji Trophy. In the same year, he was selected to play in the Syed Mushtaq Ali Trophy. He played as an impact player against Sikkim and grabbed 2 wickets for 32 runs.
