= KN Luitel =

Indian cricketer (born 1993)

Personal information
- Full name: Khara Nanda Luitel
- Born: 28 April 1993 (age 33); Gangchun, Pakyong, Sikkim
- Batting: Left-handed
- Bowling: Left-arm medium
- Role: Bowler

Domestic team information
- Years: Team
- 2018-Present: Sikkim
- Source: ESPNcricinfo, 7 November 2019

KN Luitel (born 28 April 1993) is an Indian cricketer. He made his Twenty20 debut for Sikkim in the 2018–19 Syed Mushtaq Ali Trophy on 21 February 2019.
