= Mandup Bhutia =

Indian cricketer (born 1994)

Personal information
- Born: 25 December 1994 (age 31); Namchi, Sikkim, India
- Source: ESPNcricinfo, 20 September 2018

Mandup Bhutia (born 25 December 1994) is an Indian cricketer. He made his List A debut for Sikkim in the 2018–19 Vijay Hazare Trophy on 20 September 2018. He was the leading wicket-taker for Sikkim in the 2018–19 Vijay Hazare Trophy, with five dismissals in seven matches. He made his first-class debut for Sikkim in the 2018–19 Ranji Trophy on 6 December 2018. He made his Twenty20 debut for Sikkim in the 2018–19 Syed Mushtaq Ali Trophy on 22 February 2019.
