= Jaya Luintel =

Nepali journalist

Jaya Luintel is a Nepali journalist. She completed a Master's degree in Gender Studies from Tribhuvan University in Nepal. Luintel began her career in 1999, working at Radio Sagarmatha in Kathmandu, Nepal. In 2002 she launched the station's first show focusing on gender issues. In 2012, Luintel co-founded The Story Kitchen, an organization which works to amplify HerStory.

In 2014 she was named an Asia Foundation Development Fellow, and she was also recognized as one of the BBC's 100 women of 2014. The same year, she organized Nepal's first national conference for women in radio broadcasting.
