= Parth Sahani =

Indian cricketer (born 1993)

Personal information
- Full name: Parth Mukesh Sahani
- Born: 9 March 1993 (age 33); Ujjain, Madhya Pradesh, India
- Batting: Left-handed
- Bowling: Slow left-arm orthodox
- Role: Batsman

Domestic team information
- Years: Team
- 2015-present: Madhya Pradesh
- Source: Cricinfo, 26 February, 2016

Parth Mukesh Sahani (born 9 March 1993) is an Indian cricketer who plays for Madhya Pradesh cricket team. He made his Twenty20 debut against Railways cricket team at Holkar Stadium in March, 2015 he made his List A debut against Saurashtra cricket team at Saurashtra Cricket Association Stadium in December, 2015 He made his first-class debut on 22 June 2022, for Madhya Pradesh in the final of the 2021–22 Ranji Trophy.

He is the son of former MP player and coach Mukesh Sahni.
