= Karnajit Yumnam =

Indian cricketer (born 1997)

Personal information
- Full name: Karnajit Karamchand Yumnam
- Born: 27 December 1997 (age 28); Imphal West, Manipur
- Source: ESPNcricinfo, 24 September 2019

Karnajit Karamchand Yumnam (born 27 December 1997) is an Indian cricketer. He made his List A debut on 28 September 2019, for Manipur in the 2019–20 Vijay Hazare Trophy. He made his Twenty20 debut on 11 January 2021, for Manipur in the 2020–21 Syed Mushtaq Ali Trophy.
