= Ronald Longjam =

Indian cricketer (born 1997)

Personal information
- Full name: Ronald Meitei Longjam
- Born: 10 August 1997 (age 29); Imphal, Manipur
- Source: Cricinfo, 16 October 2019

Ronald Meitei Longjam (born 10 August 1997) is an Indian cricketer. He made his List A debut on 13 October 2019, for Manipur in the 2019–20 Vijay Hazare Trophy.
