= Johnson Singh =

Indian cricketer (born 1999)

Personal information
- Full name: Ngariyanbam Johnson Singh
- Born: 10 November 1999 (age 27); Imphal, Manipur
- Source: ESPNcricinfo, 24 September 2019

Ngariyanbam Johnson Singh (born 10 November 1999) is an Indian cricketer. He made his List A debut on 28 September 2019, for Manipur in the 2019–20 Vijay Hazare Trophy. He made his Twenty20 debut on 8 November 2019, for Manipur in the 2019–20 Syed Mushtaq Ali Trophy. He made his first-class debut on 17 February 2022, for Manipur in the 2021–22 Ranji Trophy.
