= Rajesh Bishnoi (cricketer, born 1990) =

Indian cricketer (born 1990)

Personal information
- Full name: Rajesh Barsingharam Bishnoi
- Born: 25 January 1990 (age 36); Nagaur, Rajasthan, India
- Batting: Left-handed
- Bowling: Slow left arm orthodox

Domestic team information
- Years: Team
- 2013-2019: Rajasthan
- 2021-2022: Arunachal Pradesh
- 2022-present: Meghalaya
- Source: Cricinfo, 29 November 2017

Rajesh Bishnoi (born 25 January 1990) is an Indian cricketer who plays for Meghalaya. He made his first-class debut for Rajasthan in the 2016–17 Ranji Trophy on 13 November 2016.
