= Raj Biswa =

Indian cricketer (born 1993)

Personal information
- Full name: Raj Raju Biswa
- Born: 15 October 1993 (age 33); Shillong, Meghalaya
- Batting: Right handed
- Bowling: Right arm offbreak

Domestic team information
- Years: Team
- 2018–19: Meghalaya
- Source: Cricinfo, 20 September 2018

Raj Biswa (born 15 October 1993) is an Indian cricketer. He made his List A debut for Meghalaya in the 2018–19 Vijay Hazare Trophy on 20 September 2018. He made his first-class debut for Meghalaya in the 2018–19 Ranji Trophy on 1 November 2018. He made his Twenty20 debut for Meghalaya in the 2018–19 Syed Mushtaq Ali Trophy on 21 February 2019.
