= Harshit Rana =

Indian cricketer (born 2001)

Personal information
- Full name: Harshit Pradeep Rana
- Born: 22 December 2001 (age 24); Ghevra, Delhi, India
- Height: 6 ft 2 in (188 cm)
- Batting: Right-handed
- Bowling: Right-arm fast
- Role: Bowler

International information
- National side: India (2024–present)
- Test debut (cap 316): 22 November 2024 v Australia
- Last Test: 6 December 2024 v Australia
- ODI debut (cap 258): 6 February 2025 v England
- Last ODI: 18 January 2026 v New Zealand
- ODI shirt no.: 22
- T20I debut (cap 119): 31 January 2025 v England
- Last T20I: 28 January 2026 v New Zealand
- T20I shirt no.: 22

Domestic team information
- Years: Team
- 2022–present: Delhi
- 2022–present: Kolkata Knight Riders

Career statistics
Competition	Test	ODI	T20I	FC
Matches	2	14	14	14
Runs scored	7	124	101	499
Batting average	2.33	24.80	14.42	31.18
100s/50s	0/0	0/1	0/0	1/2
Top score	7	52	35	122*
Balls bowled	270	687	252	2,067
Wickets	4	26	16	50
Bowling average	50.75	27.38	25.50	27.80
5 wickets in innings	0	0	0	2
10 wickets in match	0	0	0	1
Best bowling	3/48	4/39	3/24	7/45
Catches/stumpings	1/–	2/–	2/–	3/–
Medal record
Men's cricket
Representing India
ICC Champions Trophy
Winner	2025 Pakistan
ACC Asia Cup
Winner	2025 UAE
- Source: ESPNcricinfo, 8 February 2026

Harshit Pradeep Rana (Hindi: [hʌɾˈʃɪt̪ ɾaːɳaː]; born 22 December 2001) is an Indian international cricketer. He plays for Delhi in domestic cricket and Kolkata Knight Riders in the Indian Premier League. Rana was a member of the Indian squad which won the 2025 ICC Champions Trophy and the 2025 Asia Cup.

== Early life ==
Rana was born on 22 December 2001 in Ghevra near the Delhi–Haryana border. At the age of 10, he began cricket training under his father Pradeep Rana, a former hammer thrower and weightlifter for the CRPF. Rana studied at Ganga International School, where he was noticed by coach Shravan Kumar, from whom he received formal training.

== Domestic career ==
In February 2022, he was signed up by the Kolkata Knight Riders in the auction for the 2022 Indian Premier League (IPL). He made his Twenty20 debut on 28 April 2022, for the Kolkata Knight Riders in the 2022 IPL.

He scored his maiden first-class century during the 2023 Duleep Trophy quarterfinal, when he scored 122 not out from 86 balls, playing for North Zone.

He was the joint-fourth-highest wicket-taker at the 2024 Indian Premier League with 19 wickets in 13 matches at an average of 20.16.

== International career ==
Rana made his international debut against Australia in the first Test of the 2024–25 Border-Gavaskar Trophy series on 22 November 2024 in Perth. He made his T20I debut on 31 January 2025 against England at Pune, when he replaced Shivam Dube during the match as a concussion substitute.

Rana made his One Day International (ODI) debut against England on 6 February 2025 and registered figures of 3/53. He was named in India's 15-member squad for the 2025 ICC Champions Trophy after Jasprit Bumrah was ruled out before the tournament due to an injury. On 25 October 2025, Rana took 4/39 which were the best figures for an Indian at the SCG in Sydney.

On 11 January 2026, 1st ODI against New Zealand in Vadodara, Harshit Rana justified the call emphatically. With the ball, he struck twice, dismissing New Zealand openers Devon Conway and Henry Nicholls. With the bat, he chipped in with a brisk 29 off 23 balls, including two boundaries and a six, easing the pressure on KL Rahul, who calmly guided India home. He bowled a peach of a delivery in the 2nd ODI to get rid of Devon Conway.

Rana continued to impress in the 3rd and deciding ODI of the series against New Zealand on 18 January 2026, taking 3–84 in his allotted quota while also scoring his maiden ODI half-century, hammering 52 runs off 43 balls which included 4 fours and 4 sixes. He forged a large and crucial partnership with the bat alongside centurion Virat Kohli, although India ultimately lost the match by 41 runs.

He was ruled out of the 2026 ICC Men's T20 World Cup after sustaining a knee injury during a warm-up match against South Africa. Following medical assessments, he was eventually withdrawn from the tournament.
