= Swarajeet Das =

Indian cricketer (born 1995)

Personal information
- Full name: Swarajeet Bijoy Das
- Born: 23 March 1995 (age 31); Shillong, Meghalaya
- Source: Cricinfo, 6 December 2018

Swarajeet Das (born 23 March 1995) is an Indian cricketer. He made his first-class debut for Meghalaya in the 2018–19 Ranji Trophy on 6 December 2018. He made his Twenty20 debut for Meghalaya in the 2018–19 Syed Mushtaq Ali Trophy on 21 February 2019. He made his List A debut on 24 September 2019, for Meghalaya in the 2019–20 Vijay Hazare Trophy.
