= Ulenyai Khwairakpam =

Indian cricketer (born 2003)

Personal information
- Born: 27 December 2003 (age 22)
- Source: Cricinfo, 25 February 2021

Ulenyai Khwairakpam (born 27 December 2003) is an Indian cricketer. He made his List A debut on 25 February 2021, for Manipur in the 2020–21 Vijay Hazare Trophy.
