= Abhay Negi =

Indian cricketer (born 1992)

Personal information
- Born: 18 October 1992 (age 34); Uttarakhand, India
- Batting: Right-handed
- Bowling: Right-arm medium-fast

Domestic team information
- Years: Team
- 2017-2018: Tripura
- 2018-2021: Meghalaya
- 2022-present: Uttarakhand
- Source: ESPNcricinfo, 20 September 2018

Abhay Negi (born 18 October 1992) is an Indian cricketer. He made his List A debut for Meghalaya in the 2018–19 Vijay Hazare Trophy on 20 September 2018. He was the joint-leading wicket-taker for Meghalaya in the 2018–19 Vijay Hazare Trophy, with fourteen dismissals in eight matches. He made his first-class debut for Meghalaya in the 2018–19 Ranji Trophy on 1 November 2018.
