= Larry Sangma =

Indian cricketer (born 1992)

Personal information
- Full name: Larry Gomes Sangma
- Born: 5 October 1992 (age 34); Phulbari, West Garo Hills, Meghalaya
- Batting: Right-handed
- Bowling: Right-arm fast-medium
- Role: Batting all-rounder

Domestic team information
- Years: Team
- 2018/19–present: Meghalaya
- Source: ESPNcricinfo, 27 February 2019

Larry Sangma (born 5 October 1992) is an Indian cricketer. He made his Twenty20 debut for Meghalaya in the 2018–19 Syed Mushtaq Ali Trophy on 27 February 2019. He made his List A debut on 11 October 2019, for Meghalaya in the 2019–20 Vijay Hazare Trophy. He made his first-class debut on 17 February 2022, for Meghalaya in the 2021–22 Ranji Trophy.
