= Kumar Nyompu =

Indian cricketer (born 1992)

Personal information
- Full name: Kumar Taku Nyompu
- Born: 7 September 1992 (age 34); Subansiri, Assam, India
- Batting: Left-handed
- Bowling: Right-arm offbreak

Domestic team information
- Years: Team
- 2020/21: Arunachal Pradesh
- Source: ESPNcricinfo, 11 January 2021

Kumar Nyompu (born 7 September 1992) is an Indian cricketer. He made his Twenty20 debut on 11 January 2021, for Arunachal Pradesh in the 2020–21 Syed Mushtaq Ali Trophy. He made his List A debut on 1 March 2021, for Arunachal Pradesh in the 2020–21 Vijay Hazare Trophy. He made his first-class debut on 24 February 2022, for Arunachal Pradesh in the 2021–22 Ranji Trophy.
