= Priyojit Singh Kangabam =

Indian cricketer (born 1994)

Kangabam Singh
Personal information
- Full name: Kangabam Priyojit Singh
- Born: 24 November 1994 (age 31); Imphal, Manipur
- Source: Cricinfo, 19 September 2018

Kangabam Priyojit Singh (born 24 November 1994) is an Indian cricketer. He made his List A debut for Manipur in the 2018–19 Vijay Hazare Trophy on 19 September 2018. He made his first-class debut for Manipur in the 2018–19 Ranji Trophy on 1 November 2018. He made his Twenty20 debut for Manipur in the 2018–19 Syed Mushtaq Ali Trophy on 21 February 2019.
