= Saransh Jain =

Indian cricketer (born 1993)

Personal information
- Full name: Saransh Subodh Jain
- Born: 31 March 1993 (age 33); Indore, Madhya Pradesh, India
- Batting: Left-handed
- Bowling: Right-arm offbreak
- Role: Bowling all-rounder

International information
- National side: India (2026–present)
- Only Test (cap 320): 23 August 2026 v Sri Lanka

Domestic team information
- Years: Team
- 2013/14–present: Madhya Pradesh

Career statistics
Competition	FC	LA	T20
Matches	42	39	20
Runs scored	1,455	501	37
Batting average	25.98	19.26	6.16
100s/50s	1/8	0/1	0/0
Top score	100	56	11
Balls bowled	7,395	1,851	330
Wickets	131	31	18
Bowling average	28.51	43.00	19.11
5 wickets in innings	7	0	0
10 wickets in match	0	0	0
Best bowling	6/103	3/29	3/13
Catches/stumpings	14/–	11/–	5/–
- Source: ESPNcricinfo, 20 March 2025

Saransh Jain (born 31 March 1993) is an Indian cricketer. He made his first-class debut for Madhya Pradesh in the 2014–15 Ranji Trophy on 21 December 2014. He made his List A debut for Madhya Pradesh in the 2016–17 Vijay Hazare Trophy on 25 February 2017.

== International Career ==
On 23 August 2026, Jain was handed his maiden Test and international cap and made his debut during the 2nd Test against Sri Lanka.
