= Babul Kumar =

Indian cricketer (born 1993)

Personal information
- Full name: Babul Pawan Kumar
- Born: 12 January 1993 (age 33); Patna, Bihar, India
- Batting: Right-handed

Domestic team information
- Years: Team
- 2018–present: Bihar
- First-class debut: 29 December 2012 Jharkhand v Services
- List A debut: 19 September 2018 Bihar v Nagaland

Career statistics
| Competition | FC | LA | T20 |
|---|---|---|---|
| Matches | 39 | 31 | 33 |
| Runs scored | 2,223 | 1,186 | 589 |
| Batting average | 34.73 | 43.92 | 20.31 |
| 100s/50s | 5/9 | 3/8 | 0/2 |
| Top score | 229* | 121* | 82 |
| Balls bowled | 179 | 25 | 18 |
| Wickets | 0 | 0 | 0 |
| Bowling average | – | – | – |
| 5 wickets in innings | 0 | 0 | 0 |
| 10 wickets in match | 0 | 0 | 0 |
| Best bowling | – | – | – |
| Catches/stumpings | 45/– | 7/– | 9/– |
- Source: ESPNcricinfo, 9 April 2025

Babul Kumar (born 12 January 1993) is an Indian cricketer. He made his List A debut for Bihar in the 2018–19 Vijay Hazare Trophy on 19 September 2018, scoring 121 not out. He was the leading run-scorer for Bihar in the tournament, with 419 runs in eight matches. He made his Twenty20 debut for Bihar in the 2018–19 Syed Mushtaq Ali Trophy on 22 February 2019.
