= Rongsen Jonathan =

Indian cricketer

Personal information
- Full name: Jonathan Rongsen Longkumer
- Born: 4 October 1986 (age 40); Umaga, Karnataka, India
- Batting: Right-handed
- Bowling: Right-arm medium pace
- Role: All-rounder

Domestic team information
- Years: Team
- 2009-10: Karnataka
- 2013/14–2016/17: Railways
- 2018/19–Present: Nagaland
- Source: ESPNcricinfo, 17 June 2022

Rongsen Jonathan (born 4 October 1986) is an Indian cricketer who captains Nagaland in domestic cricket. He is an all-rounder; a right-handed middle order batter and right-arm medium pacer.

== Early life and background ==
Jonathan was born on 4 October 1986. A native of Akhoya village in Mokokchung district of Nagaland, he started playing cricket from a young age with limited cricketing facilities in his home state. His family moved to Bengaluru in 1997 when Jonathan was 12. He joined St Joseph's Boys' High School, Bangalore where he was a teammate with Robin Uthappa and played tournaments like Cottonian Shield and Parle G Cup are part of the school's cricket team. He won the best batsman award in the Cottonian Shield which paved the way for his selection in the Karnataka U-16 cricket team. As a 14-year-old, he continued to live in Bengaluru to pursue his career even after his family moved to Dimapur.

== Career ==
He made his Twenty20 debut for Karnataka in the 2009-10 Syed Mushtaq Ali Trophy on 25 September 2009. He made his List A debut for the same side in the 2009-10 Vijay Hazare Trophy on 10 February 2010. He made his first-class debut for Railways in the 2013–14 Ranji Trophy on 6 December 2013.

Ahead of the 2018–19 Ranji Trophy, he transferred from Railways to Nagaland.

He was the leading run-scorer for Nagaland in the 2018-19 Syed Mushtaq Ali Trophy with 121 runs.

On 24 September 2019, Jonathan scored a century in the 2019–20 Vijay Hazare Trophy match between Nagaland and Manipur. However, the match was later called off, after only 8.4 overs were bowled in the second innings, with the fixture rescheduled, thus making his maiden List A century invalid.

In March 2021, he was selected to play for Morecambe Cricket Club as a replacement for Mitchell Van Buuren for its 2021 season.
