= Bishworjit Konthoujam =

Indian cricketer (born 1996)

Personal information
- Full name: Bishworjit Singh Konthoujam
- Born: 3 February 1996 (age 30); Imphal, Manipur, India
- Batting: Right-handed
- Bowling: Right-arm medium-fast
- Source: ESPNcricinfo, 19 September 2018

Bishworjit Singh Konthoujam (born 3 February 1996) is an Indian cricketer. He made his List A debut for Manipur in the 2018–19 Vijay Hazare Trophy on 19 September 2018. He was the leading wicket-taker for Manipur in the 2018–19 Vijay Hazare Trophy, with nine dismissals in seven matches.

He made his first-class debut for Manipur in the 2018–19 Ranji Trophy on 1 November 2018. He was the leading wicket-taker for Manipur in the tournament, with 30 dismissals in eight matches. He made his Twenty20 debut for Manipur in the 2018–19 Syed Mushtaq Ali Trophy on 21 February 2019.
