= Sachin Kumar Singh =

Indian cricketer (born 1997)

Personal information
- Full name: Sachin Kumar Singh
- Born: 25 December 1997 (age 28); Gopalganj, Bihar, India

Domestic team information
- Years: Team
- 2019–present: Bihar
- Source: ESPNcricinfo, 25 September 2019

Sachin Kumar Singh (born 25 December 1997) is an Indian cricketer. He made his List A debut on 25 September 2019, for Bihar in the 2019–20 Vijay Hazare Trophy. He made his Twenty20 debut on 11 January 2021, for Bihar in the 2020–21 Syed Mushtaq Ali Trophy. He made his first-class debut on 17 February 2022, for Bihar in the 2021–22 Ranji Trophy.
