= Akash Choudhary =

Indian cricketer (born 1999)

Personal information
- Full name: Akash Kumar Choudhary
- Born: 28 November 1999 (age 26)
- Source: ESPNcricinfo, 21 February 2019

Akash Choudhary (born 28 November 1999) is an Indian cricketer who plays for Meghalaya in domestic competitions. He has appeared in formats including the Ranji Trophy and the Syed Mushtaq Ali Trophy, primarily as a right-arm medium-pace bowler. He holds the world record for fastest half-century, and the first and only player to hit consecutive eight sixes in first class cricket.

== Career ==
Choudhary made his Twenty20 debut for Meghalaya in the 2018–19 Syed Mushtaq Ali Trophy on 21 February 2019. He made his List A debut on 24 September 2019, for Meghalaya in the 2019–20 Vijay Hazare Trophy. He made his first-class debut on 9 December 2019, for Meghalaya in the 2019–20 Ranji Trophy.

In November 2025, during a Ranji Trophy Plate Group match between Meghalaya and Arunachal Pradesh in Surat, Choudhary scored a fastest half-century in the history of first-class cricket, with just 11 balls. Batting in the lower order during Meghalaya's second innings, he hit eight consecutive sixes across two overs, including six sixes in one over.
