= Prafullomani Singh =

Indian cricketer (born 1994)

Personal information
- Full name: Pukhrambam Prafullomani Singh
- Born: 1 March 1994 (age 32); Imphal, Manipur
- Source: Cricinfo, 19 September 2018

Pukhrambam Prafullomani Singh (born 1 March 1994) is an Indian cricketer. He made his List A debut for Manipur in the 2018–19 Vijay Hazare Trophy on 19 September 2018. He made his first-class debut for Manipur in the 2018–19 Ranji Trophy on 1 November 2018. He made his Twenty20 debut for Manipur in the 2018–19 Syed Mushtaq Ali Trophy on 21 February 2019.
