= Vasuki Koushik =

Indian cricketer (born 1992)

Personal information
- Born: 19 September 1992 (age 34)
- Batting: Right-handed
- Bowling: Right-arm medium
- Role: Bowler

Domestic team information
- Years: Team
- 2019–present: Karnataka

Career statistics
Competition	FC	LA	T20
Matches	9	29	33
Runs scored	12	26	7
Batting average	2.40	8.66	7.00
100s/50s	0/0	0/0	0/0
Top score	5*	9*	3*
Balls bowled	1,753	1362	687
Wickets	42	54	40
Bowling average	15.16	14.88	21.75
5 wickets in innings	1	0	0
10 wickets in match	0	0	0
Best bowling	6/54	4/27	4/19
Catches/stumpings	1/–	8/–	0/–
- Source: Cricinfo, 30 November 2023

Vasuki Koushik (born 19 September 1992) is an Indian cricketer.

He made his Twenty20 debut for Karnataka in the 2018–19 Syed Mushtaq Ali Trophy on 24 February 2019. He made his List A debut on 8 October 2019, for Karnataka in the 2019–20 Vijay Hazare Trophy. Before his profession cricket debut, he was a mechanical engineer who once worked for Amazon, Koushik grew up playing cricket on the grounds of Bangalore. Until the age of 17, he was an offspinner but bowled medium pace in tennis-ball matches. He made his first-class debut on 9 December 2019, for Karnataka in the 2019–20 Ranji Trophy.
