= Sikkim cricket team =

Indian cricket team

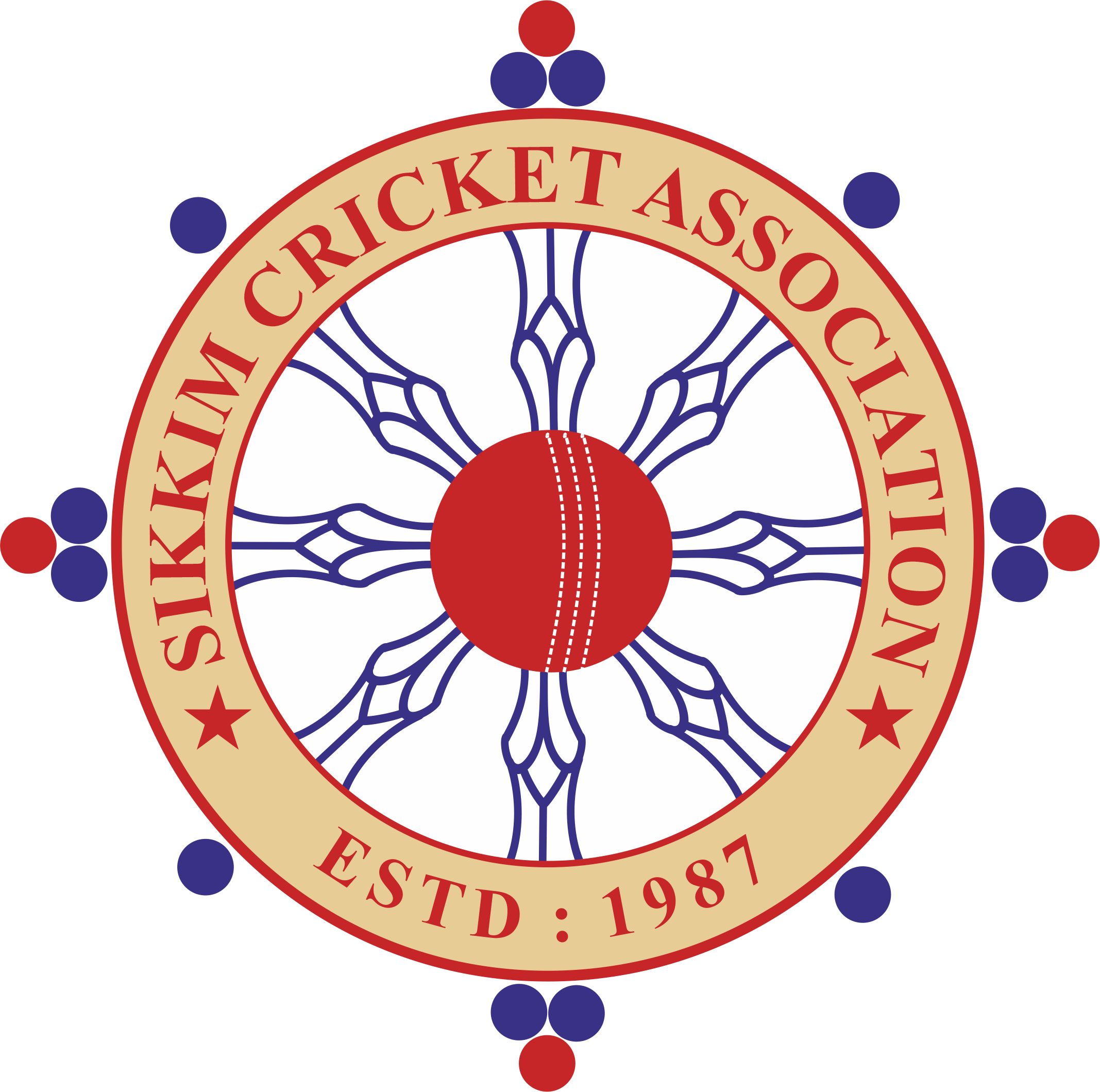

Personnel
- Captain: Lee Yong Lepcha
- Coach: Sanjeev Sharma
- Owner: Sikkim Cricket Association

Team information
- Founded: 2018
- Home ground: Mining Cricket Stadium, Rangpo

History
- First-class debut: Manipur in 2018 at Jadavpur University Campus Ground, Kolkata
- Ranji Trophy wins: 0
- Vijay Hazare Trophy wins: 0
- Syed Mushtaq Ali Trophy wins: 0

The Sikkim cricket team represents the state of Sikkim in Indian domestic cricket competitions. In July 2018, the Board of Control for Cricket in India (BCCI) named the team as one of the nine new sides that would compete in domestic tournaments for the 2018–19 season, including the Ranji Trophy and the Vijay Hazare Trophy. However, prior to the start of the tournament, the team did not have a ground to play first-class cricket on. Unlike some of the other new teams, Sikkim decided to enter their first List A competition with a team made up entirely of home-grown players. Ahead of the 2018–19 season, Sanjeev Sharma was appointed as the team's coach.

In September 2018, they lost their opening fixture of the 2018–19 Vijay Hazare Trophy, to Manipur, by 10 wickets. In the Round 8 fixture against Bihar, Sikkim were bowled out for 46 runs, with Bihar winning by 292 runs, the biggest margin of defeat by runs in Indian domestic cricket. In their first season in the Vijay Hazare Trophy, they finished in the last place in the Plate Group, losing all eight matches. Lee Yong Lepcha finished as the leading run-scorer, with 214 runs, and Mandup Bhutia was the leading wicket-taker for the team, with five dismissals.

In November 2018, in their opening match of the 2018–19 Ranji Trophy, they beat Manipur by an innings and 27 runs. In the sixth round of fixtures, Milind Kumar became the first batsman to score 1,000 runs in this edition of the tournament. He did so in the match against Mizoram, in his ninth innings of the competition. They finished the 2018–19 tournament fifth in the table, with four wins from their eight matches.

In March 2019, Sikkim finished in last place in Group C of the 2018–19 Syed Mushtaq Ali Trophy, with no wins from their six matches. Milind Kumar was the leading run-scorer for the team in the tournament, with 159 runs, and Bipul Sharma was the leading wicket-taker, with seven dismissals. However, the former left the team ahead of the 2019–20 Ranji Trophy tournament.

== Famous players ==
- Lee Yong Lepcha (2018-present) - He is the most successful captain for Sikkim in List A & Twenty20 cricket
- Palzor Tamang (2018-present) - He is the leading wicket-taker for Sikkim in List A & Twenty20 cricket
- Ashish Thapa (2018-present) - He is the leading run-scorer for Sikkim in all three formats
- Sumit Singh (2021-2024)
- Ankur Malik (2022-present)

== Squad ==
Name	Birth date	Batting style	Bowling style	Notes
Batsmen
Amit Rajera	1 December 1999 (age 26)	Right-handed		
Sai Satwik	3 September 2005 (age 21)	Left-handed		
Robin Limboo	10 July 2002 (age 24)	Right-handed	Right-arm medium	
Pranesh Chettri	27 February 2000 (age 26)	Right-handed	Right-arm medium	
Anwesh Sharma	20 February 2001 (age 25)	Right-handed	Right-arm leg break	
Nilesh Lamichaney	4 September 1991 (age 35)	Right-handed	Right-arm leg break	
Parth Palawat	14 June 1999 (age 27)	Right-handed	Right-arm off break	
All-rounders
Gurinder Singh	9 July 1992 (age 34)	Right-handed	Slow left-arm orthodox	
Lee Yong Lepcha	7 November 1991 (age 34)	Right-handed	Right-arm off break	Captain
Palzor Tamang	22 February 1993 (age 33)	Right-handed	Right-arm medium	Vice-captain
Ankur Malik	5 November 2003 (age 22)	Right-handed	Right-arm leg break	
Kranthi Kumar	21 December 1993 (age 32)	Right-handed	Right-arm medium	
Rahul Kumar	15 August 2002 (age 24)	Right-handed	Right-arm off break	
Wicket-keepers
Ashish Thapa	4 January 1994 (age 32)	Right-handed		
Arun Chettri	28 October 2002 (age 23)	Left-handed		
Spin bowlers
Md. Saptulla	10 June 1998 (age 28)	Right-handed	Right-arm off break	
Siddharth Prasad	21 August 2005 (age 21)	Right-handed	Right-arm off break	
Satyajeet Bachhav	28 November 1992 (age 33)	Right-handed	Slow left arm orthodox	
Pace bowlers
Bijay Prasad	5 September 2002 (age 24)	Right-handed	Right-arm medium	
Abhishek Kumar	16 October 2002 (age 23)	Right-handed	Right-arm medium	

Updated as on 11 October 2026
