= Jadavpur University Ground =

Cricket ground in West Bengal, India

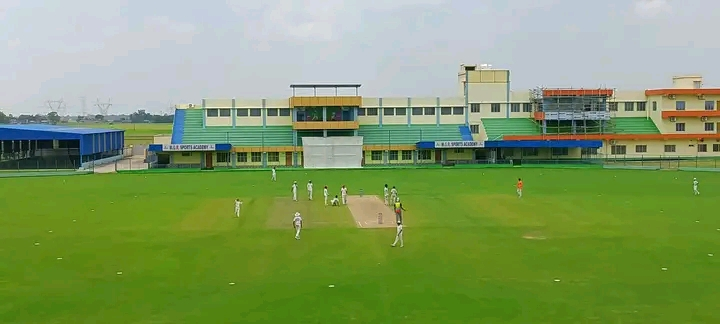
- during Ranji trophy match
- Full name: Jadavpur University Campus Stadium
- Former names: Jadavpur University Campus Ground
- Location: Bidhannagar, West Bengal
- Owner: Jadavpur University
- Operator: Cricket Association of Bengal
- Capacity: 5,000

Construction
- Groundbreaking: 2004
- Opened: 2004

Tenant
- Bengal cricket team

Website
- cricketarchive

Jadavpur University Ground is a multi-purpose stadium located in Salt Lake City Campus of Jadavpur University, West Bengal. The ground is mainly used for organizing matches of football, cricket and other sports. The main ground at the Salt Lake campus has been leased out to the Cricket Association of Bengal and it often plays host to inter- and intrastate cricket matches. The stadium was established in 2004 when the ground hosted Ranji Trophy match between Bengal cricket team and Karnataka cricket team Since then, it hosted four more First-class cricket matches.

The stadium is regular host of List A and Twenty20 cricket matches
