= Langlonyamba Keishangbam =

Indian cricketer (born 1997)

Personal information
- Full name: Langlonyamba Singh Meitan Keishangbam
- Born: 6 December 1997 (age 28); Imphal, Manipur, India
- Source: ESPNcricinfo, 24 September 2019

Langlonyamba Singh Meitan Keishangbam (born 6 December 1997) is an Indian cricketer. He made his List A debut on 28 September 2019, for Manipur in the 2019–20 Vijay Hazare Trophy. He made his first-class debut on 9 December 2019, for Manipur in the 2019–20 Ranji Trophy. He made his Twenty20 debut on 11 January 2021, for Manipur in the 2020–21 Syed Mushtaq Ali Trophy.
