= Dippu Sangma =

Indian cricketer (born 1997)

Personal information
- Full name: Dippu Ch Sangma
- Born: 20 May 1997 (age 29)
- Source: ESPNcricinfo, 21 September 2018

Dippu Sangma (born 20 May 1997) is an Indian cricketer. He made his List A debut for Meghalaya in the 2018–19 Vijay Hazare Trophy on 21 September 2018. He made his first-class debut for Meghalaya in the 2018–19 Ranji Trophy on 1 November 2018. He made his Twenty20 debut on 11 January 2021, for Meghalaya in the 2020–21 Syed Mushtaq Ali Trophy.
