= Nilesh Lamichaney =

Indian cricketer (born 1991)

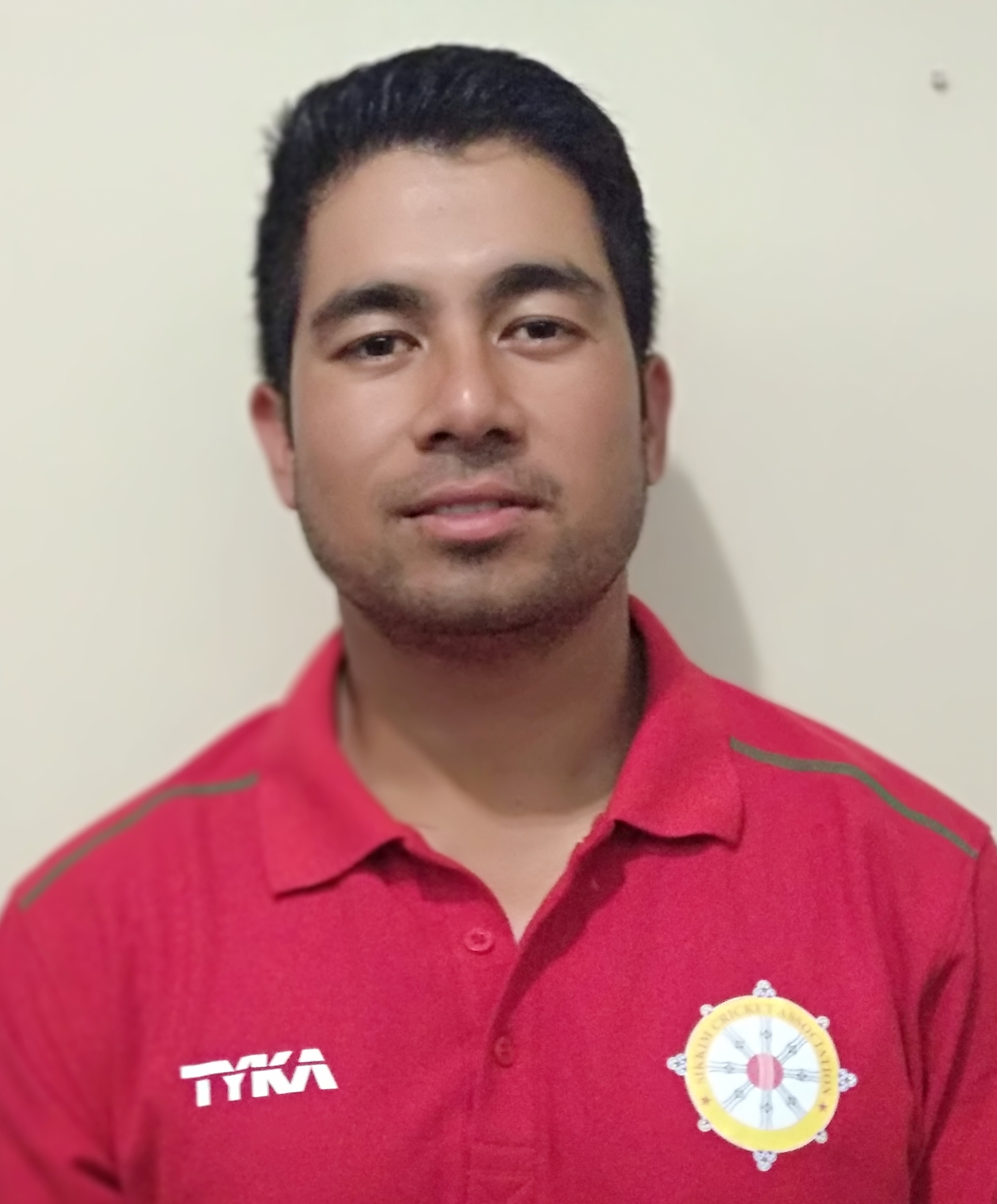

Personal information
- Full name: Nilesh Lamichaney
- Born: 4 September 1991 (age 35); Gangtok, Sikkim, India
- Batting: Right-handed

Domestic team information
- Years: Team
- 2018-19 –: Sikkim
- Source: ESPNcricinfo, 20 September 2018

Nilesh Lamichaney (born 4 September 1991) is an Indian cricketer. He made his List A debut for Sikkim in the 2018–19 Vijay Hazare Trophy on 20 September 2018.

Having been Sikkim's outstanding batsman in under-age competitions, he was appointed to captain Sikkim in their inaugural competition at List A level. In Sikkim's second match he became the first player to score a century for Sikkim, when he made 123 against Arunachal Pradesh on 21 September 2018.

He made his first-class debut for Sikkim in the 2018–19 Ranji Trophy on 1 November 2018. He made his Twenty20 debut for Sikkim in the 2018–19 Syed Mushtaq Ali Trophy on 21 February 2019.
