= Lee Yong Lepcha =

Indian cricketer (born 1991)

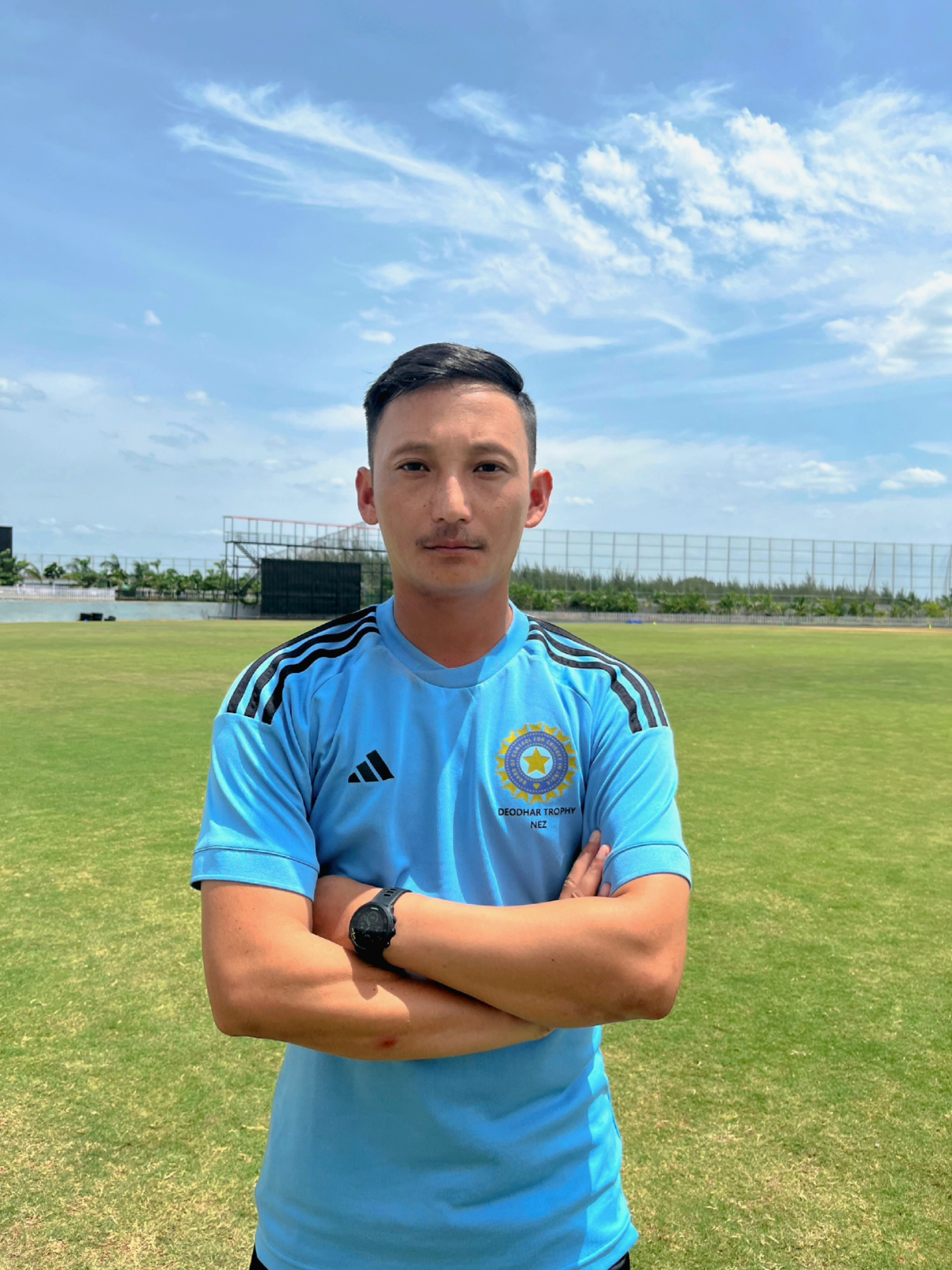

Personal information
- Full name: Lee Yong Lepcha
- Born: 7 November 1991 (age 34); Gangtok, Sikkim
- Batting: Right-handed
- Bowling: Right-arm off-spin
- Role: All-rounder

Domestic team information
- Years: Team
- 2018–: Sikkim
- Source: ESPNcricinfo, 20 September 2018

Lee Yong Lepcha (born 7 November 1991) is an Indian cricketer.

He made his List A debut for Sikkim in the 2018–19 Vijay Hazare Trophy on 20 September 2018. He was the leading run-scorer for Sikkim in the 2018–19 Vijay Hazare Trophy, with 214 runs in eight matches. He made his first-class debut for Sikkim in the 2018–19 Ranji Trophy on 1 November 2018. He made his Twenty20 debut for Sikkim in the 2018–19 Syed Mushtaq Ali Trophy on 21 February 2019.
