= Palzor Tamang =

Indian cricketer (born 1993)

Personal information
- Born: 22 February 1993 (age 33); Gangtok, Sikkim, India
- Batting: Right-handed
- Bowling: Right arm medium

Domestic team information
- Years: Team
- 2018–19: Sikkim
- Source: Cricinfo, 20 September 2018

Palzor Tamang (born 22 February 1993) is an Indian cricketer.

He made his List A debut for Sikkim in the 2018–19 Vijay Hazare Trophy on 20 September 2018. He made his first-class and Twenty20 debut also for Sikkim in the 2018–19 Ranji Trophy (on 1 November 2018), and the 2018–19 Syed Mushtaq Ali Trophy (on 21 February 2019), respectively. In January 2020, he became the first cricketer for Sikkim to take a five-wicket haul in first-class cricket, doing so in a match against Manipur in the 2019–20 Ranji Trophy.
