= Kishan Singha =

Indian cricketer (born 1996)

Personal information
- Full name: L Kishan Singha.
- Born: 23 December 1996 (age 29); Imphal West, Manipur
- Source: ESPNcricinfo, 11 January 2021

L Kishan Singha (born 23 December 1996) is an Indian cricketer. He made his Twenty20 debut on 11 January 2021 for Manipur in the 2020–21 Syed Mushtaq Ali Trophy. He made his List A debut on 21 February 2021 for Manipur in the 2020–21 Vijay Hazare Trophy. He made his first-class debut on 17 February 2022 for Manipur in the 2021–22 Ranji Trophy. He took a hat-trick in his debut match.
