= Sumit Singh (cricketer) =

Indian cricketer (born 1987)

Personal information
- Born: 10 September 1987 (age 39); Delhi, India
- Source: ESPNcricinfo, 30 January 2017

Sumit Singh (born 10 September 1987) is an Indian cricketer. He made his first-class debut for Services in the 2010–11 Ranji Trophy on 1 November 2010.
