= Manipur cricket team =

Indian cricket team

Personnel
- Captain: Langlonyamba Keishangbam
- Coach: Shiv Sunder Das
- Owner: Manipur Cricket Association

Team information
- Founded: 2018

History
- First-class debut: Sikkim in 2018 at Jadavpur University Campus Ground, Kolkata
- Ranji Trophy wins: 0
- Vijay Hazare Trophy wins: 0
- Syed Mushtaq Ali Trophy wins: 0
- Official website: manipurcricket.com

The Manipur cricket team represents the state of Manipur in Indian domestic cricket competitions. In July 2018, the Board of Control for Cricket in India (BCCI) named the team as one of the nine new sides that would compete in domestic tournaments for the 2018–19 season, including the Ranji Trophy and the Vijay Hazare Trophy. Ahead of the 2018–19 season, Shiv Sunder Das was appointed as the team's coach.

In September 2018, they lost their opening fixture of the 2018–19 Vijay Hazare Trophy, to Puducherry, by 8 wickets. The following day, they won their first fixture of the tournament, beating Sikkim by 10 wickets. In their first season in the Vijay Hazare Trophy, they finished in sixth place in the Plate Group, with two wins and five defeats from their eight matches. One match also finished as a no result. Yashpal Singh finished as the leading run-scorer, with 488 runs, and Bishworjit Singh was the leading wicket-taker for the team, with nine dismissals.

In November 2018, in their opening match of the 2018–19 Ranji Trophy, they lost to Sikkim by an innings and 27 runs. They won their first match of the 2018–19 Ranji Trophy in round three of the competition, beating Mizoram by eight wickets. They finished the 2018–19 tournament sixth in the table, with three wins from their eight matches.

In March 2019, Manipur finished sixth in Group A of the 2018–19 Syed Mushtaq Ali Trophy, with one win from their six matches. Mayank Raghav was the leading run-scorer for the team in the tournament, with 301 runs, and Yashpal Singh was the leading wicket-taker, with four dismissals. In January 2020, in the round six fixture of the 2019–20 Ranji Trophy against Meghalaya, Manipur were bowled out for only 27 runs in their first innings. On 12 February 2020, their fixture against Chandigarh was the 60,000th first-class cricket match to be played.

== Notable Players ==
- Bishworjit Konthoujam (2018-present)
- Priyojit Kangabam (2018-present)
- Langlonyamba Keishangbam (2019-present)

== Squad ==
Name	Birth date	Batting style	Bowling style	Notes
Batsmen
Priyojit Kangabam	24 November 1994 (age 31)	Right-handed	Right-arm medium-fast	
Johnson Ngariyanbam	10 October 1999 (age 27)	Right-handed		
Karnajit Yumnam	27 December 1997 (age 28)	Right-handed		
Langlonyamba Keishangbam	6 December 1997 (age 28)	Right-handed	Right-arm leg break	Captain
Ronald Longjam	10 August 1997 (age 29)	Right-handed		
Mohammed Mustaque	12 March 2001 (age 25)	Right-handed	Right-arm off break	
Santosh Khangembam	30 May 1999 (age 27)	Right-handed		
Thoiba Ningthoujam	24 March 2008 (age 18)	Left-handed		
Sanatombaroy Laiphangbam	29 December 1997 (age 28)	Right-handed		
Jotin Lamabam	10 March 2002 (age 24)	Right-handed	Right-arm medium	
All-rounders
Jotin Pheiroijam	15 March 2006 (age 20)	Right-handed	Right-arm medium	
Bidash Chingakham	21 January 2001 (age 25)	Right-handed	Right-arm medium-fast	
Wicket-keepers
Ulenyai Khwairakpam	27 December 2003 (age 22)	Right-handed		
Al Bashid Muhammed	27 April 1998 (age 28)	Right-handed		
Jameson Ngariayanbam	10 October 1999 (age 27)	Right-handed		
Andyroshan Mandingbam	16 March 2002 (age 24)	Right-handed		
Spin bowlers
Kishan Singha	23 December 1996 (age 29)	Right-handed	Slow left-arm orthodox	
Ajay Lamabam	8 February 1999 (age 27)	Left-handed	Slow left-arm orthodox	
Kiran Laishram	8 November 2001 (age 24)	Left-handed	Slow left-arm orthodox	
Soubam Rohit Kiran	10 October 2000 (age 26)	Right-handed	Right-arm off break	
Pace bowlers
Bishworjit Konthoujam	3 February 1996 (age 30)	Right-handed	Right-arm medium-fast	
Rex Rajkumar	30 August 2000 (age 26)	Left-handed	Left-arm medium-fast	
Kishan Thokchom	1 January 1990 (age 36)	Right-handed	Right-arm medium	
Denin Nongthombam	1 January 1997 (age 29)	Right-handed	Right-arm medium	

Updated as on 26 October 2026
