= Meghalaya cricket team =

Indian cricket team

Personnel
- Captain: Kishan Lyngdoh (FC); Dippu Sangma (LA); Akash Choudhary (T20)
- Coach: Goutam Shome
- Owner: Meghalaya Cricket Association

Team information
- Founded: 2018
- Home ground: Meghalaya Cricket Association Cricket Ground

History
- First-class debut: Arunachal Pradesh in 2018 at Meghalaya Cricket Association Cricket Ground, Shillong
- Ranji Trophy wins: 0
- Vijay Hazare Trophy wins: 0
- Syed Mushtaq Ali Trophy wins: 0

The Meghalaya cricket team is a cricket team that represents the state of Meghalaya in Indian domestic competitions. In July 2018, the Board of Control for Cricket in India (BCCI) named the team as one of the nine new sides that would compete in domestic tournaments for the 2018–19 season, including the Ranji Trophy and the Vijay Hazare Trophy. However, prior to the start of the tournament, the team did not have a ground to play first-class cricket on. Ahead of the 2018–19 season, Sanath Kumar was appointed as the team's coach.

In September 2018, they won their opening fixture of the 2018–19 Vijay Hazare Trophy, beating Mizoram by 8 wickets. In their first season in the Vijay Hazare Trophy, they finished in fifth place in the Plate Group, with four wins and four defeats from their eight matches. Puneet Bisht finished as the leading run-scorer, with 502 runs, and Gurinder Singh and Abhay Negi were the joint-leading wicket-takers for the team, with fourteen dismissals each.

In November 2018, in their opening match of the 2018–19 Ranji Trophy, they beat Arunachal Pradesh by seven wickets. They finished the 2018–19 tournament fourth in the table, with four wins from their eight matches.

In March 2019, Meghalaya finished in last place in Group B of the 2018–19 Syed Mushtaq Ali Trophy, with no wins from their six matches. Gurinder Singh was the leading run-scorer for the team in the tournament, with 207 runs, and Abhay Negi was the leading wicket-taker, with eight dismissals.

== Notable Players ==
- Puneet Bisht (2018-2023)
- Akash Choudhary (2019-present)

== Squad ==
Players with international caps are listed in bold

Name	Birth date	Batting style	Bowling style	Notes
Batsmen
Kishan Lyngdoh	21 March 1998 (age 28)	Right-handed	Right-arm medium-fast	First-class Captain
Swastic Chettri	29 November 2001 (age 24)	Right-handed	Right-arm off break	
Jaskirat Sachdeva	15 November 1999 (age 26)	Right-handed	Right-arm off break	
Rahul Dalal	2 February 1992 (age 34)	Right-handed		
Larry Sangma	5 October 1992 (age 34)	Right-handed	Right-arm medium	
Kush Agarwal	30 December 2001 (age 24)	Right-handed	Right-arm leg break	
Bamanbha Shangpliang	15 August 1997 (age 29)	Left-handed	Right-arm off break	
Abhishek Gupta	10 September 2001 (age 25)	Right-handed	Right-arm medium	
Kevin Christopher	20 September 2002 (age 24)	Right-handed	Right-arm off break	
All-rounders
Ajay Duhan	22 October 1995 (age 31)	Right-handed	Right-arm leg break	
Swarajeet Das	23 March 1995 (age 31)	Right-handed	Right-arm medium	
PM Santhosh	23 March 1995 (age 31)	Right-handed	Right-arm medium	
Wicket-keepers
Arpit Bhatewara	3 January 1994 (age 32)	Right-handed		
Arien Sangma	1 February 1999 (age 27)	Left-handed		
Spin bowlers
Aryan Bora	15 November 2000 (age 25)	Right-handed	Slow left arm orthodox	
Anish Charak	19 April 2000 (age 26)	Right-handed	Slow left arm orthodox	
Agreas Sangma	22 October 2002 (age 24)	Left-handed	Slow left arm orthodox	
Himan Pukhan	9 February 1998 (age 28)	Right-handed	Right-arm leg break	
Bipin Ray	10 March 2002 (age 24)	Right-handed	Right-arm off break	
Pace bowlers
Akash Choudhary	28 November 1999 (age 26)	Right-handed	Right-arm medium	Twenty20 Captain
Dippu Sangma	20 May 1997 (age 29)	Right-handed	Right-arm medium	List A Captain
Ram Gurung	14 April 1998 (age 28)	Right-handed	Right-arm medium-fast	
Aaron Nongrum	19 September 2000 (age 26)	Right-handed	Right-arm medium	
Abhishek Kumar	4 May 2002 (age 24)	Right-handed	Right-arm medium	
Riboklang Hynniewta	16 September 1997 (age 29)	Right-handed	Right-arm medium	

Updated as on 2 November 2026
