= 2022–23 Ranji Trophy Group D =

Cricket tournament

- Dates: 13 December 2022 – 10 February 2023
- Administrator: BCCI
- Cricket format: First-class cricket
- Tournament format: Round-robin then knockout
- Participants: 8

The 2022–23 Ranji Trophy is the 88th season of the Ranji Trophy, the premier first-class cricket tournament in India. It is contested by 38 teams, divided into four elite groups and a plate group, with eight teams in Group D. The tournament was announced by the Board of Control for Cricket in India (BCCI) on 8 August 2022.

== Points table ==
| Pos | Team | Pld | W | L | T | D | NR | Pts | Quot |
|---|---|---|---|---|---|---|---|---|---|
| 1 | Madhya Pradesh | 7 | 5 | 1 | 0 | 1 | 0 | 33 | 1.414 |
| 2 | Punjab | 7 | 3 | 0 | 0 | 4 | 0 | 27 | 1.605 |
| 3 | Railways | 7 | 3 | 2 | 0 | 2 | 0 | 22 | 1.123 |
| 4 | Vidarbha | 7 | 3 | 2 | 0 | 2 | 0 | 20 | 1.197 |
| 5 | Gujarat | 7 | 2 | 4 | 0 | 1 | 0 | 14 | 0.899 |
| 6 | Tripura | 7 | 0 | 2 | 0 | 5 | 0 | 11 | 0.760 |
| 7 | Jammu & Kashmir | 7 | 1 | 4 | 0 | 2 | 0 | 8 | 0.768 |
| 8 | Chandigarh | 7 | 0 | 2 | 0 | 5 | 0 | 7 | 0.490 |

Updated to match(es) played on 27 January 2023. Source: ESPN Cricinfo

Advances to Quarter-final

== Fixtures ==
=== Round 1 ===
13–16 December 2022
Scorecard

| Punjab | v | Chandigarh |
| 586/4d (141.1 overs); Prabhsimran Singh 202 (278); Rohit Dhanda 3/100 (29 overs) | | 389 (174.2 overs); Gaurav Puri 131 (304); Baltej Singh 3/48 (31 overs) |
| | | 92/6 (37 overs) (f/o); Ankit Kaushik 49 (79); Vinay Choudhary 3/17 (13 overs) |

Match drawn
Maharaja Yadavindra Singh International Cricket Stadium, Mullanpur
Umpires: C. K. Nandan and Nitin Pandit
Player of the match: Prabhsimran Singh (Punjab)

- Chandigarh won the toss and elected to field.
- Naman Dhir (Punjab), Rohit Dhanda and Bhagmender Lather (Chandigarh) all made their first-class debuts.

13–15 December 2022
Scorecard

| Madhya Pradesh | v | Jammu and Kashmir |
| 308 (111.2 overs); Yash Dubey 81 (181); Auqib Nabi 4/65 (20 overs) | | 98 (38.5 overs); Vivrant Sharma 34 (66); Avesh Khan 5/33 (9.5 overs) |
| | | 193 (60.5 overs) (f/o); Sahil Lotra 66 (111); Avesh Khan 3/53 (13 overs) |

Madhya Pradesh won by an innings and 17 runs
Hostel Ground JKCA, Jammu
Umpires: Ulhas Gandhe and Chirra Ravikanthreddy
Player of the match: Avesh Khan (Madhya Pradesh)

- Madhya Pradesh won the toss and elected to bat.
- Sahil Lotra, Vivrant Sharma and Shivansh Sharma (Jammu and Kashmir) all made their first-class debuts.

13–16 December 2022
Scorecard

| Gujarat | v | Tripura |
| 271 (75.3 overs); Priyank Panchal 111 (176); Manisankar Murasingh 5/74 (23.3 overs) | | 293 (100 overs); Rajat Dey 63 (126); Shen Patel 3/67 (18 overs) |
| 233/8d (60.2 overs); Priyank Panchal 85 (125); Manisankar Murasingh 5/85 (21.2 overs) | | 116/3 (35.5 overs); Sridam Paul 55* (87); Arzan Nagwaswalla 2/43 (12 overs) |

Match drawn
Maharaja Bir Bikram College Stadium, Agartala
Umpires: K. N. Ananthapadmanabhan and Manish Jain
Player of the match: Manisankar Murasingh (Tripura)

- Tripura won the toss and elected to field.
- Shen Patel (Gujarat), Deepak Khatri and Parvez Sultan (Tripura) all made their first-class debuts.

13–16 December 2022
Scorecard

| Vidarbha | v | Railways |
| 213 (80.4 overs); Faiz Fazal 112 (219); Karn Sharma 8/38 (19.4 overs) | | 161 (55.2 overs); Vivek Singh 81 (131); Aditya Sarwate 5/53 (19 overs) |
| 420/8d (106 overs); Akshay Wadkar 130* (167); Adarsh Singh 3/52 (14 overs) | | 278 (92.2 overs); Amit Mishra 119 (167); Akshay Wakhare 4/83 (34.2 overs) |

Vidarbha won by 194 runs
Vidarbha Cricket Association Stadium, Nagpur
Umpires: Sadashiv Iyer and Vikas Lund
Player of the match: Faiz Fazal (Vidarbha)

- Vidarbha won the toss and elected to bat.
- Adarsh Singh (Railways) made his first-class debut.

=== Round 2 ===
20–21 December 2022
Scorecard

| Madhya Pradesh | v | Chandigarh |
| 309 (95.2 overs); Rajat Patidar 88 (116); Sandeep Sharma 7/93 (25.2 overs) | | 57 (24 overs); Arslan Khan 34 (58); Kumar Kartikeya 6/20 (8 overs) |
| | | 127 (44.3 overs) (f/o); Ankit Kaushik 69 (121); Saransh Jain 5/37 (15.3 overs) |

Madhya Pradesh won by an innings and 125 runs
Holkar Stadium, Indore
Umpires: Saurabh Dhote and Krishnaraj Srinath
Player of the match: Kumar Kartikeya (Madhya Pradesh)

- Madhya Pradesh won the toss and elected to bat.
- Hartejassvi Kapoor (Chandigarh) made his first-class debut.

20–22 December 2022
Scorecard

| Gujarat | v | Jammu and Kashmir |
| 307 (104.3 overs); Saurav Chauhan 73 (100); Abid Mushtaq 4/104 (37 overs) | | 135 (43.5 overs); Faiz Fazal 51* (84); Siddharth Desai 6/38 (12.5 overs) |
| 11/1 (2.5 overs); Saurav Chauhan 4* (3); Abid Mushtaq 1/5 (1.5 overs) | | 182 (58 overs) (f/o); Henan Nazir 43 (97); Siddharth Desai 8/66 (18 overs) |

Gujarat won by 9 wickets
Narendra Modi Stadium, Ahmedabad
Umpires: Tapan Sharma and Virender Sharma
Player of the match: Siddharth Desai (Gujarat)

- Gujarat won the toss and elected to bat.

20–23 December 2022
Scorecard

| Vidarbha | v | Tripura |
| 264 (83.3 overs); Atharva Taide 53 (83); Ajoy Sarkar 6/74 (18.3 overs) | | 299 (95.3 overs); Sudip Chatterjee 83 (183); Yash Thakur 5/44 (20 overs) |
| 379/8d (82 overs); Ganesh Satish 151* (206); Parvez Sultan 3/96 (26 overs) | | 124 (51.2 overs); Wriddhiman Saha 27 (69); Akshay Wakhare 4/50 (14.2 overs) |

Vidarbha won by 220 runs
Vidarbha Cricket Association Stadium, Nagpur
Umpires: Somnath Jha and C. K. Nandan
Player of the match: Ganesh Satish (Vidarbha)

- Vidarbha won the toss and elected to bat.
- Substitute: Udiyan Bose for Bikramkumar Das (Tripura).

20–23 December 2022
Scorecard

| Railways | v | Punjab |
| 102 (46.3 overs); Karn Sharma 17 (35); Siddarth Kaul 5/37 (19 overs) | | 152/6d (38 overs); Naman Dhir 57 (83); Sagar Jadhav 3/40 (8 overs) |
| 49/0 (9 overs); Vivek Singh 30* (28) |

Match drawn
Karnail Singh Stadium, Delhi
Umpires: Rajeev Godara and Madanagopal Kuppuraj
Player of the match: Siddarth Kaul (Punjab)

- Punjab won the toss and elected to field.
- Sagar Jadhav (Railways) and Gurnoor Brar (Punjab) both made their first-class debuts.
- Match was restarted from Day 3 due to bad condition of the pitch.

=== Round 3 ===
27–30 December 2022
Scorecard

| Punjab | v | Tripura |
| 203 (64.2 overs); Prabhsimran Singh 55 (106); Manisankar Murasingh 5/48 (24.2 overs) | | 322/4 (114 overs); Sudip Chatterjee 112* (287); Vinay Choudhary 2/47 (18 overs) |

Match drawn
Maharaja Bir Bikram College Stadium, Agartala
Umpires: Madanagopal Kuppuraj and Anand Ovalekar
Player of the match: Manisankar Murasingh (Tripura)

- Tripura won the toss and elected to field.
- Day 1 and 2 were effected by rain.

27–30 December 2022
Scorecard

| Chandigarh | v | Gujarat |
| 304 (116 overs); Bhagmender Lather 87 (162); Shen Patel 4/85 (30 overs) | | 596/4d (134 overs); Priyank Panchal 257* (353); Bhagmender Lather 3/147 (37 overs) |
| 205 (75.3 overs); Jagjit Singh 46 (42); Hardik Patel 4/66 (29 overs) |

Gujarat won by an innings and 87 runs
Sardar Vallabhbhai Patel Stadium, Ahmedabad
Umpires: Anish Sahasrabudhe and Krishnamachari Srinivasan
Player of the match: Priyank Panchal (Gujarat)

- Chandigarh won the toss and elected to bat.

27–30 December 2022
Scorecard

| Railways | v | Madhya Pradesh |
| 274 (87.4 overs); Upendra Yadav 61 (123); Avesh Khan 4/69 (20 overs) | | 255 (84.5 overs); Rajat Patidar 54 (99); Sagar Jadhav 5/34 (14.5 overs) |
| 195 (72 overs); Shivam Chaudhary 53 (103); Kumar Kartikeya 5/54 (24 overs) | | 215/8 (79.3 overs); Himanshu Mantri 45 (142); Mohit Raut 2/24 (9 overs) |

Madhya Pradesh won by 2 wickets
Holkar Stadium, Indore
Umpires: Nitin Pandit and A Sivakumar
Player of the match: Saransh Jain (Madhya Pradesh)

- Railways won the toss and elected to bat.
- Shubham Chaubey and Mohit Raut (Railways) both made their first-class debuts.

27–29 December 2022
Scorecard

| Jammu and Kashmir | v | Vidarbha |
| 191 (68 overs); Musaif Ajaz 41 (95); Yash Thakur 4/40 (14 overs) | | 272 (83.5 overs); Aditya Sarwate 75 (137); Umar Nazir Mir 5/39 (21 overs) |
| 221 (59.4 overs); Shubham Khajuria 109 (177); Akshay Wakhare 4/50 (10 overs) | | 101 (34 overs); Atharva Taide 42 (78); Abid Mushtaq 8/18 (8 overs) |

Jammu and Kashmir won by 39 runs
Vidarbha Cricket Association Stadium, Nagpur
Umpires: Shaktipada Bhattacharya and Nand Kishore
Player of the match: Abid Mushtaq (Jammu and Kashmir)

- Jammu and Kashmir won the toss and elected to bat.
- Taizeem Tak (Jammu and Kashmir), Nachiket Bhute, Harsh Dubey and Aman Mokhade (Vidarbha) all made their first-class debuts.

=== Round 4 ===
3–6 January 2023
Scorecard

| Chandigarh | v | Tripura |
| 455/3 (114.4 overs); Manan Vohra 200 (313); Abhijit Sarkar 2/84 (18.4 overs) |

Match drawn
Maharaja Bir Bikram College Stadium, Agartala
Umpires: Abhijit Bhattacharya and Rohan Ingvale
Player of the match: Manan Vohra (Chandigarh)

- Tripura won the toss and elected to field.
- Rain prevented any further play.
- No play was held on Day 3 and Day 4 due to rain.
- Arjun Debnath (Tripura) made his first-class debut.

3–5 January 2023
Scorecard

| Punjab | v | Gujarat |
| 286 (96.1 overs); Nehal Wadhera 123 (255); Chintan Gaja 5/66 (21 overs) | | 97 (34.2 overs); Het Patel 26 (31); Baltej Singh 7/28 (16 overs) |
| 329/9d (72 overs); Naman Dhir 134 (185); Chintan Gaja 3/104 (19 overs) | | 138 (35.4 overs); Manan Hingrajia 74* (97); Baltej Singh 4/38 (13 overs) |

Punjab won by 380 runs
Sardar Vallabhbhai Patel Stadium, Valsad
Umpires: Madanagopal Kuppuraj and Kamlesh Sharma
Player of the match: Baltej Singh (Punjab)

- Punjab won the toss and elected to bat.
- Nehal Wadhera (Punjab) made his first-class debut.

3–5 January 2023
Scorecard

| Railways | v | Jammu and Kashmir |
| 427 (105.1 overs); Mohammad Saif 233* (293); Abid Mushtaq 4/98 (26.1 overs) | | 161 (60.3 overs); Suryansh Raina 48 (89); Akash Pandey 6/49 (21.3 overs) |
| | | 193 (62.4 overs) (f/o); Fazil Rashid 53 (57); Akash Pandey 4/58 (23 overs) |

Railways won by an innings and 73 runs
Lalabhai Contractor Stadium, Surat
Umpires: Dharmesh Bhardwaj and Nand Kishore
Player of the match: Mohammad Saif (Railways)

- Railways won the toss and elected to bat.
- Tahir Bhat (Jammu and Kashmir) made his first-class debut.

3–6 January 2023
Scorecard

| Madhya Pradesh | v | Vidarbha |
| 309 (108.2 overs); Rajat Patidar 121 (236); Yash Thakur 4/59 (24.2 overs) | | 160 (71 overs); Sanjay Raghunath 58 (189); Avesh Khan 7/38 (22 overs) |
| 257/5d (68 overs); Himanshu Mantri 126 (194); Lalit Yadav 2/57 (13 overs) | | 201 (73.1 overs); Faiz Fazal 65 (193); Avesh Khan 5/44 (17.1 overs) |

Madhya Pradesh won by 205 runs
Holkar Stadium, Indore
Umpires: Saiyed Khalid and Pashchim Pathak
Player of the match: Avesh Khan (Madhya Pradesh)

- Vidarbha won the toss and elected to field.
- Aman Solanki (Madhya Pradesh) made his first-class debut.

=== Round 5 ===
10–13 January 2023
Scorecard

| Jammu and Kashmir | v | Punjab |
| 212 (54.1 overs); Abdul Samad 46 (29); Baltej Singh 5/47 (15.1 overs) | | 268 (61.2 overs); Mandeep Singh 69 (104); Rohit Sharma 3/63 (14 overs) |
| 260 (63.4 overs); Musaif Ajaz 89 (122); Baltej Singh 5/45 (19 overs) | | 210/6 (24.5 overs); Abhishek Sharma 83 (47); Abid Mushtaq 4/56 (8 overs) |

Punjab won by 4 wickets
Inderjit Singh Bindra Stadium, Mohali
Umpires: Ganesh Charhate and Bahuleyan Viswajith
Player of the match: Baltej Singh (Punjab)

- Jammu and Kashmir won the toss and elected to bat.
- Jassinder Singh (Punjab) made his first-class debut.

10–13 January 2023
Scorecard

| Vidarbha | v | Chandigarh |
| 307/6d (73.2 overs); Sanjay Raghunath 133 (172); Hartejassvi Kapoor 2/40 (12.2 overs) | | 16/1 (5 overs); Arjit Pannu 6* (15); Nachiket Bhute 1/1 (2 overs) |

Match drawn
Sector 16 Stadium, Chandigarh
Umpires: Nikhil Patwardhan and Karan Thakar
Player of the match: Sanjay Raghunath (Vidarbha)

- Chandigarh won the toss and elected to field.
- Rain prevented any further play.
- No play was held on Day 4 due to rain.

10–13 January 2023
Scorecard

| Madhya Pradesh | v | Gujarat |
| 312 (115.4 overs); Himanshu Mantri 159 (349); Chintan Gaja 6/49 (26 overs) | | 211 (79.2 overs); Priyank Panchal 71 (120); Kumar Kartikeya 2/39 (16.2 overs) |
| 280/6d (71.3 overs); Shubham Sharma 101* (118); Siddharth Desai 4/80 (20.3 overs) | | 121 (40.3 overs); Chintan Gaja 32 (56); Saransh Jain 4/64 (19 overs) |

Madhya Pradesh won by 260 runs
Holkar Stadium, Indore
Umpires: Rohan Pandit and Mohamad Rafi
Player of the match: Shubham Sharma (Madhya Pradesh)

- Madhya Pradesh won the toss and elected to bat.
- Harsh Gawli (Madhya Pradesh) and Aarya Desai (Gujarat) both made their first-class debuts.

10–13 January 2023
Scorecard

| Tripura | v | Railways |
| 96 (49.3 overs); Bikramkumar Das 35 (131); Akash Pandey 4/18 (16 overs) | | 337 (109.1 overs); Pratham Singh 79 (149); Deepak Khatri 4/46 (13.1 overs) |
| 449 (149.5 overs); Sudip Chatterjee 165 (297); Akash Pandey 4/105 (44.5 overs) | | 211/4 (40.3 overs); Mohammad Saif 69* (76); Rajib Dutta 2/52 (11 overs) |

Railways won by 6 wickets
Lalabhai Contractor Stadium, Surat
Umpires: Dharmesh Bhardwaj and Narayanan Janani
Player of the match: Sudip Chatterjee (Tripura)

- Tripura won the toss and elected to bat.

=== Round 6 ===
17–19 January 2023
Scorecard

| Punjab | v | Madhya Pradesh |
| 443 (116.2 overs); Nehal Wadhera 214 (333); Puneet Datey 3/91 (24 overs) | | 244 (78.4 overs); Harsh Gawli 53 (117); Siddarth Kaul 4/55 (20.4 overs) |
| | | 77 (27.5 overs) (f/o); Kumar Kartikeya 21* (28); Arshdeep Singh 4/30 (9 overs) |

Punjab won by an innings and 122 runs
Inderjit Singh Bindra Stadium, Mohali
Umpires: Ulhas Gandhe and Saidharshan Kumar
Player of the match: Nehal Wadhera (Punjab)

- Madhya Pradesh won the toss and elected to field.

17–20 January 2023
Scorecard

| Railways | v | Chandigarh |
| 386 (108.1 overs); Upendra Yadav 113 (138); Sandeep Sharma 6/116 (29 overs) | | 485/8d (149 overs); Manan Vohra 126 (214); Himanshu Sangwan 3/64 (25 overs) |
| 71/1 (17 overs); Shivam Chaudhary 33* (44); Hartejassvi Kapoor 1/28 (7 overs) |

Match drawn
Sector 16 Stadium, Chandigarh
Umpires: Rajesh Kannan and Belur Ravi
Player of the match: Sandeep Sharma (Chandigarh)

- Chandigarh won the toss and elected to field.

17–20 January 2023
Scorecard

| Jammu and Kashmir | v | Tripura |
| 446/6d (156 overs); Abhinav Puri 121 (316); Subham Ghosh 3/106 (41 overs) | | 76/4 (37 overs); Bikramkumar Das 39* (120); Abid Mushtaq 3/13 (11 overs) |

Match drawn
Hostel Ground JKCA, Jammu
Umpires: Tony Ematty and Pashchim Pathak
Player of the match: Abhinav Puri (Jammu and Kashmir)

- Jammu and Kashmir won the toss and elected to bat.
- No play was held on Day 4 due to rain.
- Amaresh Das (Tripura) made his first-class debut.

17–19 January 2023
Scorecard

| Vidarbha | v | Gujarat |
| 74 (30.3 overs); Sanjay Raghunath 33 (61); Tejas Patel 5/19 (11.3 overs) | | 256 (70.1 overs); Aarya Desai 88 (114); Aditya Sarwate 5/64 (20.1 overs) |
| 254 (65.5 overs); Jitesh Sharma 69 (53); Siddharth Desai 6/74 (25.5 overs) | | 54 (33.3 overs); Siddharth Desai 18 (47); Aditya Sarwate 6/17 (15.3 overs) |

Vidarbha won by 18 runs
Vidarbha Cricket Association Stadium, Nagpur
Umpires: Yeshwant Barde and Vikas Lund
Player of the match: Aditya Sarwate (Vidarbha)

- Vidarbha won the toss and elected to bat.
- Hemang Patel (Gujarat) and Yash Rathod (Vidarbha) both made their first-class debuts.

=== Round 7 ===
24–27 January 2023
Scorecard

| Tripura | v | Madhya Pradesh |
| 362 (134.3 overs); Sridam Paul 72 (143); Anubhav Agarwal 3/64 (24 overs) | | 331 (114.1 overs); Yash Dubey 64 (186); Rana Dutta 5/82 (33 overs) |

Match drawn
Holkar Stadium, Indore
Umpires: Arun Kumar Basa and KR Vasuki
Player of the match: Rana Dutta (Tripura)

- Madhya Pradesh won the toss and elected to field.

24–26 January 2023
Scorecard

| Railways | v | Gujarat |
| 508 (116.4 overs); Vivek Singh 97 (109); Hardik Patel 4/94 (20.4 overs) | | 205 (59.1 overs); Hemang Patel 39 (63); Himanshu Sangwan 4/75 (17 overs) |
| | | 247 (69.3 overs) (f/o); Het Patel 84 (88); Akash Pandey 6/65 (21.3 overs) |

Railways won by an innings and 56 runs
Sardar Vallabhbhai Patel Stadium, Ahmedabad
Umpires: Ganesh Charhate and Sivasubramaniyan Shankar
Player of the match: Himanshu Sangwan (Railways)

- Railways won the toss and elected to bat.
- Aditya Patel (Gujarat) made his first-class debut.

24–27 January 2023
Scorecard

| Vidarbha | v | Punjab |
| 273/6d (86 overs); Atharva Taide 112* (200); Baltej Singh 3/53 (25 overs) |

Match drawn
Inderjit Singh Bindra Stadium, Mohali
Umpires: Belur Ravi and Vinod Seshan
Player of the match: Atharva Taide (Vidarbha)

- Punjab won the toss and elected to field.
- No play was held on Day 3 due to rain.

24–27 January 2023
Scorecard

| Chandigarh | v | Jammu and Kashmir |
| 18/0 (6 overs); Arjit Pannu 8* (19) |

Match drawn
Sector 16 Stadium, Chandigarh
Umpires: Madanagopal Kuppuraj and Satrajit Lahiri

- Jammu and Kashmir won the toss and elected to field.
- No play was held on Day 2, 3 and 4 due to rain.
