= 2021–22 Ranji Trophy Group A =

Cricket tournament

- Dates: 17 February – 26 June 2022
- Administrator: BCCI
- Cricket format: First-class cricket
- Tournament format: Round-robin then knockout
- Participants: 4

The 2021–22 Ranji Trophy was the 87th season of the Ranji Trophy, the premier first-class cricket tournament in India. It was contested by 38 teams, divided into eight groups, with four teams in Group A. All the Group A league matches took place in Rajkot. The tournament was announced by the Board of Control for Cricket in India (BCCI) on 3 July 2021. Madhya Pradesh won Group A to progress to the knockout stage of the tournament.

== Points table ==
Pos	Team	Pld	W	L	T	D	NR	Pts	Quot
1	Madhya Pradesh	3	2	0	0	1	0	14	2.147
2	Kerala	3	2	0	0	1	0	14	1.648
3	Gujarat	3	1	2	0	0	0	7	1.105
4	Meghalaya	3	0	3	0	0	0	0	0.234

Updated to match(es) played on 6 March 2022. Source: ESPN Cricinfo

Advances to Quarter-final
Relegated to Plate Group next season

== Fixtures ==
=== Round 1 ===
17–20 February 2022
Scorecard

Meghalaya	v	Kerala
148 (40.5 overs); Punit Bisht 93 (90); Eden Apple Tom 4/41 (9 overs)		505/9d (140.4 overs); Ponnan Rahul 147 (239); Aryan Bora 3/105 (32.4 overs)
191 (53.5 overs); Chirag Khurana 75 (70); Basil Thampi 4/43 (16 overs)

Kerala won by an innings and 166 runs
Saurashtra Cricket Association Stadium C, Rajkot
Umpires: Krishnaraj Srinath and Pranav Joshi
Player of the match: Eden Apple Tom (Kerala)

- Kerala won the toss and elected to field.
- Eden Apple Tom (Kerala), Kishan Lyngdoh and Larry Sangma (Meghalaya) all made their first-class debuts.
- Rohan Kunnummal (Kerala) and Vathsal Govind (Kerala) both scored their maiden centuries in first-class cricket.

17–20 February 2022
Scorecard

Madhya Pradesh	v	Gujarat
274 (96.3 overs); Shubham Sharma 92 (206); Arzan Nagwaswalla 5/59 (22 overs)		331 (94.2 overs); Het Patel 72 (139); Ishwar Pandey 5/72 (25 overs)
251 (78 overs); Shubham Sharma 103* (242); Chintan Gaja 6/48 (18 overs)		88 (37.5 overs); Karan Patel 27 (55); Kumar Kartikeya 5/34 (18.5 overs)

Madhya Pradesh won by 106 runs
Saurashtra Cricket Association Stadium, Rajkot
Umpires: Anil Dandekar and C. K. Nandan
Player of the match: Shubham Sharma (Madhya Pradesh)

- Gujarat won the toss and elected to field.
- Het Patel (Gujarat) made his first-class debut.

=== Round 2 ===
24–27 February 2022
Scorecard

Gujarat	v	Kerala
388 (96.1 overs); Het Patel 185 (245); MD Nidheesh 5/54 (22 overs)		439 (107.3 overs); Rohan Kunnummal 129 (171); Siddharth Desai 5/132 (39 overs)
264 (85.5 overs); Karan Patel 81 (150); Jalaj Saxena 4/57 (18 overs)		214/2 (35.4 Overs); Rohan Kunnummal 106* (87); Chintan Gaja 1/42 (6 overs)

Kerala won by 8 wickets
Saurashtra Cricket Association Stadium C, Rajkot
Umpires: Pranav Joshi and Nitin Pandit
Player of the match: Rohan Kunnummal (Kerala)

- Kerala won the toss and elected to field.
- Saurav Chauhan and Umang Kumar (Gujarat) both made their first-class debuts.
- Het Patel (Gujarat) and Karan Patel (Gujarat) both scored their maiden first-class centuries.

24–27 February 2022
Scorecard

Meghalaya	v	Madhya Pradesh
61 (35.4 overs); Wanlambok Nongkhlaw 19 (40); Gaurav Yadav 5/11 (10 overs)		499/6d (132.3 overs); Shubham Sharma 111 (169); Akash Choudhary 2/77 (21 overs)
137 (56.2 overs); Punit Bisht 38 (64); Anubhav Agarwal 5/38 (12 overs)

Madhya Pradesh won by an innings and 301 runs
Saurashtra Cricket Association Stadium, Rajkot
Umpires: Saiyed Khalid and Krishnaraj Srinath
Player of the match: Gaurav Yadav (Madhya Pradesh)

- Meghalaya won the toss and elected to bat.
- Akshat Raghuwanshi, Anubhav Agarwal (Madhya Pradesh) and Kilco Marak (Meghalaya) all made their first-class debuts.

=== Round 3 ===
3–6 March 2022
Scorecard

Madhya Pradesh	v	Kerala
585/9d (204.3 overs); Yash Dubey 289 (591); Jalaj Saxena 6/116 (51.3 overs)		432/9 (153 overs); Ponnan Rahul 136 (368); Anubhav Agarwal 3/58 (24 overs)

Match drawn
Saurashtra Cricket Association Stadium C, Rajkot
Umpires: Saiyed Khalid and Nitin Pandit
Player of the match: Yash Dubey (Madhya Pradesh)

- Madhya Pradesh won the toss and elected to bat.

3–6 March 2022
Scorecard

Gujarat	v	Meghalaya
555/8d (141.4 overs); Bhargav Merai 223 (340); Chirag Khurana 5/151 (43 overs)		166 (51.1 overs); Punit Bisht 59 (91); Chintan Gaja 5/34 (12 overs)
		250 (73.5 overs) (f/o); Dwaraka Ravi Teja 133 (183); Arzan Nagwaswalla 4/70 (19.5 overs)

Gujarat won by an innings and 139 runs
Saurashtra Cricket Association Stadium, Rajkot
Umpires: Anil Dandekar and Rohan Pandit
Player of the match: Bhargav Merai (Gujarat)

- Gujarat won the toss and elected to bat.
- Bamanbha Shangpliang (Meghalaya), Manan Hingrajia, Parth Vaghani and Priyesh Patel (Gujarat) all made their first-class debuts.
