= 2025–26 Duleep Trophy =

First-class cricket tournament

2025 Duleep Trophy
- Dates: 28 August – 15 September 2025
- Administrator: Board of Control for Cricket in India
- Cricket format: First-class
- Tournament format: Knockout
- Host: India
- Champions: Central Zone (7th title)
- Runners-up: South Zone
- Participants: 6
- Matches: 5
- Player of the series: Saransh Jain (Central Zone)
- Most runs: Rajat Patidar (Central Zone) (382)
- Most wickets: Saransh Jain (Central Zone) (16)
- Official website: Duleep Trophy

The 2025–26 Duleep Trophy was the 62nd edition of the Duleep Trophy, a domestic first-class cricket competition played in India. It took place from 28 August to 15 September 2025. The tournament returned to a zonal format, featuring six teams: Central Zone, East Zone, North Zone, North East Zone, South Zone, and West Zone. All squads were picked by national selectors. It formed part of the 2025 Indian domestic cricket season, announced by the BCCI in June 2025.

== Squads ==
Central Zone	East Zone	North Zone	North East Zone	South Zone	West Zone
Rajat Patidar (c); ~~Dhruv Jurel (c, wk)~~; Akshay Wadkar (wk); Aryan Juyal (wk); Upendra Yadav (wk); Danish Malewar; Sanjeet Desai; Khaleel Ahmed; Deepak Chahar; Kuldeep Yadav; Harsh Dubey; Saransh Jain; Yash Rathod; Shubham Sharma; Aditya Thakare; Ayush Pandey; Manav Suthar; Yash Thakur; Kumar Kartikeya; Kuldeep Sen; Nachiket Bhute; Kukna Ajay Singh	~~Abhimanyu Easwaran (c)~~; Riyan Parag (c); ~~Ishan Kishan (c)(wk)~~; Aasirwad Swain (wk); Sandeep Pattnaik; Virat Singh; Denish Das; Sridam Paul; Sarandeep Singh; Kumar Kushagra (wk); Utkarsh Singh; Manishi; Suraj Jaiswal; Mukesh Kumar; ~~Akash Deep~~; Mukhtar Hussain; Mohammed Shami	Ankit Kumar (c); ~~Shubman Gill (c)~~; Shubham Rohilla; Shubham Khajuria; Ayush Badoni; Yash Dhull; Ankit Kalsi; Nishant Sindhu; Kanhaiya Wadhawan (wk); Sahil Lotra; Mayank Dagar; Yudhvir Singh; Arshdeep Singh; Harshit Rana; Anshul Kamboj; Auqib Nabi; Gurnoor Brar; Anuj Thakral	Rongsen Jonathan (c); Akash Choudhary (vc); Sedezhalie Rupero; Karnajit Yumnam; Hem Chetri; Jehu Anderson (wk); Arpit Bhatewara (wk); Pheiroijam Jotin; Palzor Tamang; Techi Doria; Ankur Malik; Ashish Thapa; Bishworjit Konthoujam; Aryan Bora; Ajay Lamabam	Mohammed Azharuddeen (wk,c); Narayan Jagadeesan (wk, vc); Andre Siddarth; ~~Tilak Varma (c)~~; Shaik Rasheed; Tanmay Agarwal; Devdutt Padikkal; Ravichandran Smaran; Mohit Kale; V Koushik; Salman Nizar; Tripurana Vijay; ~~R. Sai Kishore~~; Ankit Sharma; Tanay Thyagarajan; ~~Vijaykumar Vyshak~~; M. D. Nidheesh; Ricky Bhui; Nedumankuzhy Basil; Gurjapneet Singh	Shardul Thakur (c); Yashasvi Jaiswal; Aarya Desai; Harvik Desai (wk); Shreyas Iyer; ~~Sarfaraz Khan~~; Shivalik Sharma; Ruturaj Gaikwad; Jaymeet Patel; Manan Hingrajia; Saurabh Nawale (wk); Shams Mulani; Tanush Kotian; Dharmendrasinh Jadeja; Tushar Deshpande; Arzan Nagwaswalla

== Format ==
The tournament featured six teams playing in a single-elimination bracket. South Zone and West Zone pre-qualified to the semifinals, with the four remaining zonal teams required to play a quarterfinal match to start the competition.

== Fixtures ==
=== Bracket ===
Quarterfinals
North Zone	405 & 658/4d
East Zone	230
Central Zone	532/4d & 331/7d
North East Zone	185 & 200/6

Semifinals
South Zone	536 & 95/1
North Zone	361
West Zone	438 & 216/8
Central Zone	600

Final
South Zone	149 & 426
Central Zone	511 & 66/4

=== Quarterfinals ===
28–31 August 2025	North Zone	v	East Zone	Match drawn
Scorecard	405 (93.2 overs); Kanhaiya Wadhawan 76 (152); Manishi 6/111 (22.2 overs)		230 (56.1 overs); Virat Singh 69 (102); Auqib Nabi 5/28 (10.1 overs)	BCCI COE Ground 1, Bengaluru, Bengaluru; Umpires: Bhavesh Patel and Vinod Seshan; Player of the match: Auqib Nabi (North Zone)
Scorecard	658/4d (146.2 overs); Ayush Badoni 204* (223); Riyan Parag 1/78 (22 overs)			BCCI COE Ground 1, Bengaluru, Bengaluru; Umpires: Bhavesh Patel and Vinod Seshan; Player of the match: Auqib Nabi (North Zone)
East Zone won the toss and elected to field.; North Zone advanced to semi finals; Auqib Nabi (North Zone) became the first player in Duleep Trophy history to take four wickets in four balls.

28–31 August 2025	Central Zone	v	North East Zone	Match drawn
Scorecard	532/4d (102 overs); Danish Malewar 203 (222); Akash Choudhary 2/103 (23 overs)		185 (69.3 overs); Karnajit Yumnam 48 (77); Aditya Thakare 3/23 (11 overs)	BCCI COE Ground 2, Bengaluru; Umpires: Abhijit Bhattacharya and Kaushik Gandhi; Player of the match: Danish Malewar (Central Zone)
Scorecard	331/7d (80.3 overs); Shubham Sharma 122 (215); Akash Choudhary 2/44 (14 overs)		200/6 (58 overs); Jehu Anderson 64 (96); Shubham Sharma 2/10 (6 overs)	BCCI COE Ground 2, Bengaluru; Umpires: Abhijit Bhattacharya and Kaushik Gandhi; Player of the match: Danish Malewar (Central Zone)
North East Zone won the toss and elected to field.; Central Zone advanced to semi finals; Danish Malewar (Central Zone) scored his maiden double century in first-class cricket.

=== Semifinals ===
4–7 September 2025	South Zone	v	North Zone	Match drawn
Scorecard	536 (169.2 overs); Narayan Jagadeesan 197 (352); Nishant Sindhu 5/125 (47.2 overs)		361 (100.1 overs); Shubham Khajuria 128 (252); Gurjapneet Singh 4/96 (24.1 overs)	BCCI COE Ground 1, Bengaluru; Umpires: Parashar Joshi and Akshay Totre; Player of the match: Narayan Jagadeesan (South Zone)
Scorecard	95/1 (24.4 overs); Narayan Jagadeesan 52* (69); Auqib Nabi 1/23 (7 overs)			BCCI COE Ground 1, Bengaluru; Umpires: Parashar Joshi and Akshay Totre; Player of the match: Narayan Jagadeesan (South Zone)
North Zone won the toss and elected to field.; South Zone advanced to final

4–7 September 2025	West Zone	v	Central Zone	Match drawn
Scorecard	438 (108 overs); Ruturaj Gaikwad 184 (206); Harsh Dubey 3/118 (34 overs)		600 (164.3 overs); Shubham Sharma 96 (241); Dharmendrasinh Jadeja 4/130 (45 overs)	BCCI COE Ground 2, Bengaluru; Umpires: Abhijeet Bengeri and Saidharshan Kumar; Player of the match: Saransh Jain (Central Zone)
Scorecard	216/8 (53.3 overs); Yashasvi Jaiswal 64 (70); Saransh Jain 5/84 (22.3 overs)			BCCI COE Ground 2, Bengaluru; Umpires: Abhijeet Bengeri and Saidharshan Kumar; Player of the match: Saransh Jain (Central Zone)
West Zone won the toss and elected to bat.; Central Zone advanced to final.

=== Final ===
11–15 September 2025	South Zone	v	Central Zone	Central Zone won by 6 wickets
Scorecard	149 (63 overs); Tanmay Agarwal 31 (76); Saransh Jain 5/49 (24 overs)		511 (145.1 overs); Yash Rathod 194 (286); Ankit Sharma 4/180 (44.1 overs)	BCCI COE Ground 1, Bengaluru; Umpires: Mohit Krishnadas and Jayaraman Madanagopal; Player of the match: Yash Rathod (Central Zone)
Scorecard	426 (121 overs); Ankit Sharma 99 (168); Kumar Kartikeya 4/110 (39 overs)		66/4 (20.3 overs); Akshay Wadkar 19* (52); Ankit Sharma 2/22 (10 overs)	BCCI COE Ground 1, Bengaluru; Umpires: Mohit Krishnadas and Jayaraman Madanagopal; Player of the match: Yash Rathod (Central Zone)
Central Zone won the toss and elected to field.; Central Zone won Duleep Trophy for seventh time.

== Statistics ==
Highest Run Getters
Rank	Player	Team	INN	Runs	AVG	HS	100s	50s
1	Rajat Patidar	Central Zone	5	382	76.40	125	2	2
2	Yash Rathod	Central Zone	5	374	124.66	194	1	2
3	Danish Malewar	Central Zone	5	352	70.40	203	1	2
4	Ayush Badoni	North Zone	3	307	153.50	204*	1	1
5	Shubham Sharma	Central Zone	5	266	53.20	122	1	1

Leading Wicket Takers
Rank	Player	Team	INN	Wickets	BBI	AVG	ECO	4W	5W
1	Saransh Jain	Central Zone	4	16	5/49	24.00	3.29	–	2
2	Gurjapneet Singh	South Zone	3	10	4/96	24.10	4.14	2	–
3	Harsh Dubey	Central Zone	4	10	3/96	28.7	3.08	–	–
4	Kumar Kartikeya	Central Zone	2	8	4/53	20.37	2.71	2	–
5	Auqib Nabi	North Zone	3	6	5/28	20.33	2.96	–	1
