= 2024–25 Duleep Trophy =

Cricket tournament

2024 Duleep Trophy
- Dates: 5 – 22 September 2024
- Administrator: Board of Control for Cricket in India
- Cricket format: First-class
- Tournament format: Round-robin with no Knockout
- Host: India
- Champions: India A (1st title)
- Runners-up: India C
- Participants: 4
- Matches: 6
- Player of the series: Anshul Kamboj (India C)
- Most runs: Ricky Bhui (India D) (359)
- Most wickets: Anshul Kamboj (India C) (16)
- Official website: Duleep Trophy

The 2024–25 Duleep Trophy was the 61st edition of the Duleep Trophy, a domestic first-class cricket competition played in India. It took place from 5 September to 22 September 2024. The tournament was played by four teams, India A, B, C and D, unlike recent years which were played in a zonal format. All squads were picked by national selectors. It formed part of the 2024 Indian domestic cricket season, announced by the Board of Control for Cricket in India (BCCI) in June 2024.

== Squads ==
The squads for the first round for all the teams were announced by BCCI on 14 August 2024. The squads for the second round were announced on 10 September 2024.

India A	India B	India C	India D
Captain
Shubman Gill°; Mayank Agarwal^{%}	Abhimanyu Easwaran	Ruturaj Gaikwad	Shreyas Iyer
Batters
Shashwat Rawat; Pratham Singh*; Shaik Rasheed*; Tilak Varma	Yashasvi Jaiswal°; Musheer Khan; Sarfaraz Khan°; Suyash Prabhudessai*; Rinku Singh*; Suryakumar Yadav ^	Baba Indrajith; Rajat Patidar; Sai Sudharsan	Ricky Bhui; Devdutt Padikkal; Atharva Taide
Wicket-Keepers
Dhruv Jurel°; Kumar Kushagra; KL Rahul °; Akshay Wadkar*	Narayan Jagadeesan; Rishabh Pant°	Aryan Juyal; Abhishek Porel; Ishan Kishan^	KS Bharat; Sanju Samson
All-Rounders
Shivam Dube; Tanush Kotian; Riyan Parag	~~Ravindra Jadeja~~; Nitish Kumar Reddy; Washington Sundar	Anshul Kamboj; Manav Suthar; Pulkit Narang	Saransh Jain; Axar Patel°; Akash Sengupta; Nishant Sindhu
Bowlers
Khaleel Ahmed; Akash Deep°; Vidwath Kaverappa^{#}; Aaqib Khan*; Avesh Khan; Prasidh Krishna*; Shams Mulani*; Kuldeep Yadav°	Mohit Avasthi; Rahul Chahar; Yash Dayal°; Sai Kishore; Mukesh Kumar; Himanshu Mantri*; Navdeep Saini; ~~Mohammed Siraj~~	Himanshu Chauhan; ~~Umran Malik~~; Mayank Markande; Hrithik Shokeen; Vijaykumar Vyshak; Sandeep Warrier; Gaurav Yadav	~~Tushar Deshpande~~; Yash Dubey; Vidwath Kaverappa^{#}; Saurabh Kumar; Harshit Rana; Arshdeep Singh; Aditya Thakare

*Not available in first round (ruled out due to injury/replaced the players with international duties)

°Only for first round.

^{%}Mayank Agarwal was named the captain of India A after Shubman Gill had to leave for international duties.

^{#}Vidwath Kaverappa was named in India A squad for the first round but later was transferred to India D for subsequent rounds.

^Ishan Kishan wasn't available for India D in first game due to injury, later got transferred to India C as injury replacement of Suryakumar Yadav who later got transferred to India B after regaining fitness in round three.

== Format ==
4 teams are competing: India A, India B, India C, India D

There will be a total of six matches in the competition with each team playing the other three sides once. The team which finishes with the maximum points will be crowned Duleep Trophy champions. There will be no knockout matches.

== Points table ==
Team	MAT	W	L	D	T	NR	PTS	QUOT
India A	3	2	1	0	0	0	12	1.351
India C	3	1	1	1	0	0	9	1.121
India B	3	1	1	1	0	0	7	0.753
India D	3	1	2	0	0	0	6	0.870
Source: bcci.tv

The points were awarded as follows:

- Innings win/win by 10 wickets: 7
- Match outright win: 6
- 1st innings lead but no outright win: 3
- Match drawn without 1st innings lead: 1
- Match lost: 0

== Fixtures ==
=== First round ===
5–8 September 2024
Scorecard

India B	v	India A
321 (116 overs); Musheer Khan 181 (373); Akash Deep 4/60 (27 overs)		231 (72.4 overs); KL Rahul 37 (111); Navdeep Saini 3/60 (16 overs)
184 (42 overs); Rishabh Pant 61 (47); Akash Deep 5/56 (14 overs)		198 (53 overs); KL Rahul 57 (121); Yash Dayal 3/50 (12 overs)

India B won by 76 Runs
M. Chinnaswamy Stadium, Bengaluru
Umpires: Tapan Sharma and Swaroopanand Kannur
Player of the match: Musheer Khan (India B)

- India A won the toss and elected to field.

5–8 September 2024 (Note: While four days of play were scheduled for each match, the second match reached a result in three days.)
Scorecard

India D	v	India C
164 (48.3 overs); Axar Patel 86 (118); Vijaykumar Vyshak 3/19 (12 overs)		168 (62.2 overs); Baba Indrajith 72 (149); Harshit Rana 4/33 (13 overs)
236 (58.1 overs); Devdutt Padikkal 56 (70); Manav Suthar 7/49 (19.1 overs)		233/6 (61 overs); Aryan Juyal 47 (74); Saransh Jain 4/92 (22 overs)

India C won by 4 wickets
Rural Development Trust Stadium "A", Anantapur
Umpires: K. N. Ananthapadmanabhan and Vinod Seshan
Player of the match: Manav Suthar (India C)

- India C won the toss and elected to field.

=== Second round ===
12–15 September 2024
Scorecard

India A	v	India D
290 (84.3 overs); Shams Mulani 89 (187); Harshit Rana 4/51 (17.3 overs)		183 (52.1 overs); Devdutt Padikkal 92 (124); Khaleel Ahmed 3/39 (8 overs)
380/3d (96 overs); Pratham Singh 122 (189); Saurabh Kumar 2/110 (26 overs)		301 (82.2 overs); Ricky Bhui 113 (195); Tanush Kotian 4/73 (21 overs)

India A won by 187 runs
Rural Development Trust Stadium "A", Anantapur
Umpires: Pranav Joshi and Virender Sharma
Player of the match: Shams Mulani (India A)

- India D won the toss and elected to field.

12–15 September 2024
Scorecard

India C	v	India B
525 (124.1 overs); Ishan Kishan 111 (126); Mukesh Kumar 4/126 (32 overs)		332 (108 overs); Abhimanyu Easwaran 157* (286); Anshul Kamboj 8/69 (27.5 overs)
128/4d (37 overs); Ruturaj Gaikwad 62 (93); Rahul Chahar 2/8 (4 overs)

Match drawn, India C took first innings lead
Rural Development Trust Stadium "B", Anantapur
Umpires: Parashar Joshi and Saidharshan Kumar
Player of the match: Anshul Kamboj (India C)

- India B won the toss and elected to field.

=== Third round ===
19–22 September 2024
Scorecard

India D	v	India B
349 (87.3 overs); Sanju Samson 106 (101); Navdeep Saini 5/74 (18.3 overs)		282 (76.2 overs); Abhimanyu Easwaran 116 (170); Saurabh Kumar 5/73 (19.2 overs)
305 (58.3 overs); Ricky Bhui 119* (124); Mukesh Kumar 4/98 (17 overs)		115 (8.3 overs); Nitish Kumar Reddy 40* (43); Arshdeep Singh 6/40 (11.2 overs)

India D won by 257 runs
Rural Development Trust Stadium "B", Anantapur
Umpires: Abhijeet Bengeri and Abhijit Bhattacharya
Player of the match: Ricky Bhui (India D)

- India B won the toss and elected to field.

19–22 September 2024
Scorecard

India A	v	India C
297 (90.5 overs); Shashwat Rawat 124 (250); Vijaykumar Vyshak 4/51 (21 overs)		234 (71 overs); Abhishek Porel 82 (113); Aaqib Khan 3/43 (13 overs)
286/8d (66 overs); Riyan Parag 73 (101); Gaurav Yadav 4/68 (15 overs)		217 (81.5 overs); Sai Sudharsan 111 (206); Tanush Kotian 3/47 (14 overs)

India A won by 132 runs
Rural Development Trust Stadium "A", Anantapur
Umpires: Vineet Kulkarni and Vaibhav Mohan Dhokre
Player of the match: Shashwat Rawat (India A)

- India C won the toss and elected to field.

== Statistics ==
Highest Run Getters
Rank	Player	Team	INN	Runs	AVG	HS	100s	50s
1	Ricky Bhui	IND-D	6	359	71.80	113	2	1
2	Abhimanyu Easwaran	IND-B	5	309	77.25	157*	2	0
3	Shashwat Rawat	IND-A	4	256	85.33	124	1	2
4	Ruturaj Gaikwad	IND-C	6	232	38.20	62	0	2
5	Devdutt Padikkal	IND-D	6	202	33.66	92	0	3

Leading Wicket Takers
Rank	Player	Team	INN	Wickets	BBI	AVG	ECO	4W	5W
1	Anshul Kamboj	IND-C	5	16	8/69	17.12	3.19	0	1
2	Mukesh Kumar	IND-B	6	15	4/98	28.60	4.00	2	0
3	Navdeep Saini	IND-B	6	14	5/74	25.35	3.87	0	1
4	V. Vyshak	IND-C	5	10	4/51	24.90	3.23	1	0
4	Manav Suthar	IND-C	5	10	7/49	30.70	3.33	0	1
5	Akash Deep	IND-A	2	9	5/56	12.88	2.82	1	1
5	Rahul Chahar	IND-B	4	9	4/73	18.66	4.40	1	0
5	Khaleel Ahmed	IND-A	4	9	3/39	21.66	3.48	0	0

Source : ESPNCricInfo

Last Updated: 22 September 2024 (Round 3, Day 4 Lunch)

== See also ==
- 2024–25 Ranji Trophy
- 2024–25 Vijay Hazare Trophy
- 2024–25 Irani Cup
- 2024–25 Syed Mushtaq Ali Trophy
