= 2021–22 Ranji Trophy Group C =

Cricket tournament

- Dates: 17 February – 26 June 2022
- Administrator: BCCI
- Cricket format: First-class cricket
- Tournament format: Round-robin then knockout
- Participants: 4

The 2021–22 Ranji Trophy was the 87th season of the Ranji Trophy, the premier first-class cricket tournament in India. It was contested by 38 teams, divided into eight groups, with four teams in Group C. All the Group C league matches took place in Chennai. The tournament was announced by the Board of Control for Cricket in India (BCCI) on 3 July 2021. Karnataka won Group C to progress to the knockout stage of the tournament.

== Points table ==
Pos	Team	Pld	W	L	T	D	NR	Pts	Quot
1	Karnataka	3	2	0	0	1	0	16	1.681
2	Railways	3	1	0	0	2	0	10	1.324
3	Jammu & Kashmir	3	1	2	0	0	0	6	0.782
4	Pondicherry	3	0	2	0	1	0	1	0.548

Updated to match(es) played on 6 March 2022. Source: ESPN Cricinfo

Advances to Quarter-final

== Fixtures ==
=== Round 1 ===
17–20 February 2022
Scorecard

Karnataka	v	Railways
481 (109.3 overs); Manish Pandey 156 (121); Yuvraj Singh 5/93 (27.3 overs)		426 (128.3 overs); Arindam Ghosh 105 (197); Krishnappa Gowtham 4/127 (41 overs)
223/9d (63.2 overs); Ravikumar Samarth 83 (170); Amit Mishra 4/58 (21.2 overs)		69/4 (33 overs); Mohammad Saif 27* (59); Vijaykumar Vyshak 2/16 (8 overs)

Match drawn
Guru Nanak College Ground, Chennai
Umpires: Chettithody Shamshuddin and Madanagopal Kuppuraj
Player of the match: Manish Pandey (Karnataka)

- Railways won the toss and elected to field.
- Vidyadhar Patil, Vijaykumar Vyshak (Karnataka) and Yuvraj Singh (Railways) all made their first-class debuts.
- Yuvraj Singh (Railways) took his maiden five-wicket haul in first-class cricket.

17–20 February 2022
Scorecard

Pondicherry	v	Jammu & Kashmir
343 (104.3 overs); Paras Dogra 108 (187); Parvez Rasool 4/56 (18.3 overs)		426 (114.1 overs); Abdul Samad 103 (78); Sagar Trivedi 5/74 (22 overs)
124 (45.5 overs); Sagar Trivedi 37 (37); Parvez Rasool 5/29 (19.5 overs)		45/2 (12.4 overs); Shubham Pundir 21* (34); Sagar Udeshi 2/18 (6.4 overs)

Jammu & Kashmir won by 8 wickets
SSN College Ground, Chennai
Umpires: Mohamad Rafi and Ulhas Gandhe
Player of the match: Parvez Rasool (Jammu & Kashmir)

- Jammu and Kashmir won the toss and chose to field.
- Jatin Wadhwan (Jammu and Kashmir), Kothandapani Aravind, Neyan Shyam Kangayan and Vijai Raja (Pondicherry) all made their first-class debuts.

=== Round 2 ===
24–27 February 2022
Scorecard

Karnataka	v	Jammu & Kashmir
302 (103.1 overs); Karun Nair 175 (311); Parvez Rasool 4/60 (30.1 overs)		93 (29.5 overs); Qamran Iqbal 35 (45); Prasidh Krishna 6/35 (12 overs)
298/3d (71 overs); Krishnamurthy Siddharth 72 (72); Abid Mushtaq 3/65 (18 overs)		390 (98.5 overs); Ian Dev Singh 110 (188); Prasidh Krishna 4/59 (20.5 overs)

Karnataka won by 117 runs
Chemplast Cricket Ground, Chennai
Umpires: Pashchim Pathak and Krishnamachari Srinivasan
Player of the match: Karun Nair (Karnataka)

- Karnataka won the toss and elected to bat.

24–27 February 2022
Scorecard

Pondicherry	v	Railways
342 (107.1 overs); Paras Dogra 107 (170); Yuvraj Singh 3/67 (22 overs)		525/9d (151.4 overs); Arindam Ghosh 100 (193); Sagar Udeshi 3/144 (49 overs)
208/3 (62 overs); Paras Dogra 64* (96); Yuvraj Singh 2/26 (12 overs)

Match drawn
Guru Nanak College Ground, Chennai
Umpires: Chettithody Shamshuddin and Madanagopal Kuppuraj
Player of the match: Paras Dogra (Pondicherry)

- Railways won the toss and elected to field.
- Akash Pandey, Rahul Sharma (Railways) and Sidak Singh (Pondicherry) all made their first-class debuts.

=== Round 3 ===
3–6 March 2022
Scorecard

Jammu & Kashmir	v	Railways
259 (87.1 overs); Qamran Iqbal 83 (98); Karn Sharma 6/76 (29 overs)		426 (127.4 overs); Yuvraj Singh 103 (133); Abid Mushtaq 5/95 (31 overs)
203 (62 overs); Suryansh Raina 39 (84); Karn Sharma 5/64 (19 overs)		39/1 (12.4 overs); Shivam Chaudhary 18* (20); Parvez Rasool 1/7 (6 overs)

Railways won by 9 wickets
Chemplast Cricket Ground, Chennai
Umpires: Pashchim Pathak and Krishnamachari Srinivasan
Player of the match: Yuvraj Singh (Railways)

- Jammu & Kashmir won the toss and elected to bat.
- This was the 5000th Ranji Trophy Match.

3–6 March 2022
Scorecard

Karnataka	v	Pondicherry
453/8d (132.2 overs); Devdutt Padikkal 178 (309); Ashith Rajiv 4/80 (27.2 overs)		241 (77.4 overs); Damodaran Rohit 100* (133); Krishnappa Gowtham 5/86 (26.4 overs)
		192(f/o) (61 overs); Pavan Deshpande 54* (119); Shreyas Gopal 5/82 (19 overs)

Karnataka won by an innings and 20 runs
SSN College Ground, Chennai
Umpires: Mohamad Rafi and Ulhas Gandhe
Player of the match: Devdutt Padikkal (Karnataka)

- Pondicherry won the toss and elected to field.
- Vidhwath Kaverappa (Karnataka) made his first-class debut.
