= 2021–22 Ranji Trophy Group D =

Cricket tournament

- Dates: 17 February – 26 June 2022
- Administrator: BCCI
- Cricket format: First-class cricket
- Tournament format: Round-robin then knockout
- Participants: 4

The 2021–22 Ranji Trophy was the 87th season of the Ranji Trophy, the premier first-class cricket tournament in India. It was contested by 38 teams, divided into eight groups, with four teams in Group D. All the Group D league matches took place in Ahmedabad. The tournament was announced by the Board of Control for Cricket in India (BCCI) on 3 July 2021. Mumabi won Group D to progress to the knockout stage of the tournament.

== Points table ==
Pos	Team	Pld	W	L	T	D	NR	Pts	Quot
1	Mumbai	3	2	0	0	1	0	16	1.893
2	Saurashtra	3	2	0	0	1	0	14	1.441
3	Odisha	3	0	2	0	1	0	3	0.453
4	Goa	3	0	2	0	1	0	1	0.791

Updated to match(es) played on 6 March 2022. Source: ESPN Cricinfo

Advances to Quarter-final

== Fixtures ==
=== Round 1 ===
17–20 February 2022
Scorecard

Mumbai	v	Saurashtra
544/7d (157 overs); Sarfaraz Khan 275 (401); Chirag Jani 2/83 (27 overs)		220 (64.3 overs); Sheldon Jackson 61 (88); Shams Mulani 4/55 (18 overs)
		372/9 (116 overs) (f/o); Snell Patel 98 (155); Shams Mulani 7/114 (42 overs)

Match drawn
Narendra Modi Stadium, Ahmedabad
Umpires: Chirra Ravikanthreddy and Sanjay Kumar Singh
Player of the match: Sarfaraz Khan (Mumbai)

- Mumbai won the toss and elected to bat.
- Mohit Avasthi, Sachin Yadav and Siddharth Raut (Mumbai) all made their first-class debuts.

17–20 February 2022
Scorecard

Goa	v	Odisha
181 (64 overs); Eknath Kerkar 76 (113); Basant Mohanty 3/27 (18 overs)		189 (56 overs); Rajesh Dhuper 71* (107); Shubham Ranjane 5/49 (15 overs)
394/5d (106.1 overs); Snehal Kauthankar 165* (175); Abhishek Raut 3/106 (22 overs)		239/7 (100 overs); Shantanu Mishra 103 (267); Amit Yadav 2/24 (26 overs)

Match drawn
Sardar Patel Stadium B Ground, Ahmedabad
Umpires: Abhijit Deshmukh and Nikhil Patwardhan
Player of the match: Rajesh Dhuper (Odisha)

- Odisha won the toss and elected to field.
- Ashish Rai (Odisha) made his first-class debut.

=== Round 2 ===
24–27 February 2022
Scorecard

Saurashtra	v	Odisha
501 (144.3 overs); Chirag Jani 235 (373); Jayanta Behera 4/148 (32.3 overs)		165 (60 overs); Rajesh Dhuper 51 (76); Dharmendrasinh Jadeja 4/48 (23 overs)
		205 (83 overs) (f/o); Shantanu Mishra 65 (159); Dharmendrasinh Jadeja 7/88 (34 overs)

Saurashtra won by an innings and 131 runs
Sardar Patel Stadium B Ground, Ahmedabad
Umpires: AV Bhanushali and Nikhil Patwardhan
Player of the match: Chirag Jani (Saurashtra)

- Saurashtra won the toss and elected to bat.

24–27 February 2022
Scorecard

Mumbai	v	Goa
163 (52.4 overs); Sarfaraz Khan 63 (110); Lakshay Garg 6/46 (14.4 overs)		327 (104.4 overs); Eknath Kerkar 71 (148); Shams Mulani 6/107 (36.4 overs)
395/9d (132 overs); Tanush Kotian 98 (163); Darshan Misal 3/102 (36 overs)		112 (48 overs); Amulya Pandrekar 23* (42); Shams Mulani 5/60 (22 overs)

Mumbai won by 119 runs
Narendra Modi Stadium, Ahmedabad
Umpires: Kamlesh Sharma and Sanjay Kumar Singh
Player of the match: Shams Mulani (Mumbai)

- Mumbai won the toss and elected to bat.
- Prashant Solanki (Mumbai) made his first-class debut.

=== Round 3 ===
3–6 March 2022
Scorecard

Saurashtra	v	Goa
347 (87.4 overs); Chirag Jani 140 (190); Suyash Prabhudessai 2/36 (9 overs)		311 (109.5 overs); Suyash Prabhudessai 64 (133); Chetan Sakariya 3/55 (14 overs)
305/3d (57 overs); Harvik Desai 77 (114); Malliksab Sirur 1/26 (6 overs)		130 (34.3 overs); Suyash Prabhudessai 39 (71); Chetan Sakariya 6/38 (11 overs)

Saurashtra won by 311 runs
Narendra Modi Stadium, Ahmedabad
Umpires: AV Bhanushali and Chirra Ravikanthreddy
Player of the match: Chirag Jani (Saurashtra)

- Saurashtra won the toss and elected to bat.
- Malliksab Sirur (Goa) made his first-class debut.

3–6 March 2022
Scorecard

Odisha	v	Mumbai
284 (107.1 overs); Shantanu Mishra 89 (213); Mohit Avasthi 3/66 (21 overs)		532/9d (131 overs); Sarfaraz Khan 165 (181); Rajesh Mohanty 3/123 (30 overs)
140 (42 overs); Abhishek Raut 59 (71); Shams Mulani 5/64 (18 overs)

Mumbai won by an innings and 108 runs
Sardar Patel Stadium B Ground, Ahmedabad
Umpires: Abhijit Deshmukh and Kamlesh Sharma
Player of the match: Sarfaraz Khan (Mumbai)

- Odisha won the toss and elected to bat.
- Prasanta Rana (Odisha) made his first-class debut.
