= 2023–24 Ranji Trophy =

Cricket tournament

- Dates: 5 January – 14 March 2024
- Administrator: BCCI
- Cricket format: First-class cricket
- Tournament format: Round-robin then knockout
- Host: India
- Champions: Mumbai (42nd title)
- Runners-up: Vidarbha
- Participants: 38
- Matches: 138
- Player of the series: Tanush Kotian (Mumbai)
- Most runs: Ricky Bhui (Andhra) (902)
- Most wickets: R. Sai Kishore (Tamil Nadu) (53)

The 2023–24 Ranji Trophy is the 89th season of the Ranji Trophy, the premier first-class cricket tournament in India. It took place from 5 January to 14 March 2024. Saurashtra were the defending champions, winning their second Ranji Trophy in previous seasons.

== Format ==
The teams were divided into two categories named as Elite category having 32 teams split into four groups, with Plate category having 6 teams.The Elite group teams played each other once, with the top two teams from each group qualified for the quarter-finals. In the Plate Group also teams played each other once, but the top four teams qualified for the plate group knockouts, with the bottom two teams playing for the fifth and sixth positions, and another playoff for the third and fourth positions took place.The two Plate finalists will be promoted to the Elite group for the next season, 2024–25, while the bottom two teams of all the four Elite groups combined - factoring in both points and the quotient will be relegated to Plate group.

Team changes from last season
▲ Promoted to Elite Groups	▼ Relegated to Plate Group
Bihar, Manipur	Nagaland, Hyderabad

== League stage ==
=== Group A ===
Pos	Team	Pld	W	L	T	D	NR	Pts	Quot	Qualification
1	Vidarbha	7	5	1	0	1	0	33	1.351	Advances to Quarter-final
2	Saurashtra	7	4	1	0	2	0	29	1.592	Advances to Quarter-final
3	Services	7	2	1	0	4	0	25	1.625	
4	Haryana	7	3	2	0	2	0	24	1.616	
5	Rajasthan	7	2	2	0	3	0	19	1.028	
6	Jharkhand	7	2	2	0	3	0	16	0.717	
7	Maharashtra	7	1	3	0	3	0	12	0.914	
8	Manipur	7	0	7	0	0	0	0	0.224	Relegated to Plate Group for next season

Source: ESPNcricinfo

=== Group B ===
Pos	Team	Pld	W	L	T	D	NR	Pts	Quot	Qualification
1	Mumbai	7	5	1	0	1	0	37	1.647	Advances to Quarter-final
2	Andhra	7	3	1	0	3	0	26	1.177	Advances to Quarter-final
3	Bengal	7	2	2	0	3	0	19	1.314	
4	Kerala	7	1	1	0	5	0	17	1.093	
5	Chhattisgarh	7	1	1	0	5	0	16	1.082	
6	Uttar Pradesh	7	1	0	0	6	0	14	1.038	
7	Assam	7	1	4	0	2	0	8	0.680	
8	Bihar	7	0	4	0	3	0	5	0.419	

Source: ESPNcricinfo

=== Group C ===
Pos	Team	Pld	W	L	T	D	NR	Pts	Quot	Qualification
1	Tamil Nadu	7	4	1	0	2	0	28	1.782	Advances to Quarter-final
2	Karnataka	7	3	1	0	3	0	27	1.252	Advances to Quarter-final
3	Gujarat	7	4	2	0	1	0	25	1.117	
4	Railways	7	3	2	0	2	0	24	1.211	
5	Tripura	7	2	2	0	3	0	17	1.114	
6	Punjab	7	1	3	0	3	0	9	0.781	
7	Chandigarh	7	0	1	0	6	0	6	0.343	
8	Goa	7	0	5	0	2	0	4	0.754	Relegated to Plate Group for next season

Source: ESPNcricinfo

=== Group D ===
Pos	Team	Pld	W	L	T	D	NR	Pts	Quot	Qualification
1	Madhya Pradesh	7	4	0	0	3	0	32	1.535	Advances to Quarter-final
2	Baroda	7	3	1	0	3	0	24	1.149	Advances to Quarter-final
3	Delhi	7	3	2	0	2	0	20	0.940	
4	Jammu & Kashmir	7	2	1	0	4	0	18	0.928	
5	Uttarakhand	7	2	2	0	3	0	17	1.007	
6	Puducherry	7	2	4	0	1	0	13	0.884	
7	Odisha	7	1	4	0	2	0	12	0.870	
8	Himachal Pradesh	7	1	4	0	2	0	11	0.864	

Source: ESPNcricinfo

=== Plate Group ===
Pos	Team	Pld	W	L	T	D	NR	Pts	Quot	Qualification
1	Hyderabad	5	5	0	0	0	0	35	4.999	Advances to Plate semi-finals
2	Meghalaya	5	3	2	0	0	0	20	1.199	Advances to Plate semi-finals
3	Mizoram	5	2	2	0	1	0	15	0.919	Advances to Plate semi-finals
4	Nagaland	5	2	2	0	1	0	14	0.827	Advances to Plate semi-finals
5	Sikkim	5	2	3	0	0	0	13	0.902	
6	Arunachal Pradesh	5	0	5	0	0	0	0	0.300	

Source: ESPNcricinfo

== Plate knockouts ==
=== Plate semi-finals ===
Plate Semi-finals
P1	Hyderabad	462/8d
P4	Nagaland	206 & 188
P3	Mizoram	144 & 153
P2	Meghalaya	145 & 156/4

Plate Final
P1	Hyderabad	350 & 203/5
P2	Meghalaya	304 & 243

9–13 February 2024
1st Plate Semi-final
Scorecard

Hyderabad	v	Nagaland
462/8d (107 overs); Tanmay Agarwal 164 (192); Karan Tewatiya 2/45 (15 overs)		206 (60.1 overs); Joshua Ozukum 50 (91); Tanay Thyagarajan 7/63 (19 overs)
		188 (58.3 overs); Sumit Kumar 86 (115); Tanay Thyagarajan 6/81 (26.3 overs)

Hyderabad won by an innings and 68 runs
Rajiv Gandhi International Cricket Stadium, Hyderabad
Umpires: Abhijit Bengeri and Mohamed Rafi
Player of the match: Tanay Thyagarajan (Hyderabad)

- Hyderabad won the toss and elected to bat.

9–13 February 2024
2nd Plate Semi-final
Scorecard

Mizoram	v	Meghalaya
144 (46.3 overs); Agni Chopra 53 (79); Aryan Bora 6/58 (20.3 overs)		145 (44.4 overs); Kishan Lyngdoh 32 (55); Mohit Jangra 5/32 (12.4 overs)
153 (38 overs); Agni Chopra 69 (67); Akash Choudhary 5/33 (13 overs)		156/4 (35.5 overs); Kishan Lyngdoh 53* (77); Mohit Jangra 2/48 (11 overs)

Meghalaya won by 6 wickets
Mangaldoi Sports Association Ground, Mangaldoi
Umpires: Yeshwant Barde and Manish Jain
Player of the match: Aryan Bora (Meghalaya)

- Mizoram won the toss and elected to bat.

=== Plate final ===
17–21 February 2024
Plate final
Scorecard

Meghalaya	v	Hyderabad
304 (83 overs); Raj Biswa 64 (48); Tanay Thyagarajan 5/103 (34 overs)		350 (87.5 overs); Nitesh Reddy 122 (194); Chengkam Sangma 3/54 (14 overs)
243 (71.3 overs); Raj Biswa 100* (114); Tanay Thyagarajan 5/86 (21.3 overs)		203/5 (34.2 overs); Tilak Varma 64 (50); Chengkam Sangma 3/47 (7 overs)

Hyderabad won by 5 wickets
Rajiv Gandhi International Cricket Stadium, Hyderabad
Umpires: Vaibhav Dhokre and Rajeev Godara
Player of the match: Nitesh Reddy (Hyderabad)

- Meghalaya won the toss and elected to bat.
- Rishab Baslas (Hyderabad) made his first-class debut.

== Knockout stage ==
Tamil Nadu made the knockouts for the first time in six seasons after a win over Punjab in their final match of the group stage. Karnataka's drawn attempt against Chandigarh meant Tamil Nadu occupied the top spot in Group C. Vidarbha's win over Haryana took them to the top of their group, followed by defending champions Saurashtra. Group D was topped by Madhya Pradesh, with Baroda finishing second. Mumbai and Andhra took the first two spots of Group B.

Quarter-finals
A1	Vidarbha	460 & 196
C2	Karnataka	286 & 243
D1	Madhya Pradesh	234 & 107
B2	Andhra	172 & 165
B1	Mumbai	384 & 569
D2	Baroda	348 & 121/3
C1	Tamil Nadu	338
A2	Saurashtra	183 & 122

Semi-finals
A1	Vidarbha	170 & 402
D1	Madhya Pradesh	252 & 258
B1	Mumbai	378
C1	Tamil Nadu	146 & 162

Final
A1	Vidarbha	105 & 368
B1	Mumbai	224 & 418

=== Quarter-finals ===
Tamil Nadu were the first team to make the semi-final, their first since the 2016–17 edition, after their win over Saurashtra. They secured a 155-run first innings lead, with only Cheteshwar Pujara of Saurashtra offering any resistance to their bowling. Captain R. Sai Kishore returned match figures of 9/93 and helped his side secure the victory by an innings and 33 runs. Madhya Pradesh denied Andhra a maiden semi-final berth after defeating them in the fourth quarter-final. Requiring 170 runs to win after bundling Madhya Pradesh out for 107 in their second innings, Andhra were on course at 112 for 4 before captain and top-scorer Hanuma Vihari was dismissed by Anubhav Agarwal. Ashwin Hebbar (22) added 32 runs for the ninth wicket and was the last batsman dismissed, by Kulwant Khejroliya, who secured his team the win by a 4-run margin. Wicket-keeper Himanshu Mantri was a standout performer for the winners, with his 49 and 43; however, the man of the match was awarded to Agarwal for his match haul of 9/85. Madhya Pradesh made the semi-final for the third time in a row.

In the remaining quarter-final matches both of which went to final day of play, Vidarbha defeated Karnataka and Mumbai drew against Baroda, but progressed to the semi-final on first-innings lead. Karnataka looked steady in their chase of a daunting 371 and entered day five at 103 for one, but four-wicket hauls by Harsh Dubey and Aditya Sarwate meant they fell 127 runs short. Mumbai gained a 36-run lead in the first innings after Baroda were bowled out for 348 in reply to the hosts' 384. In their second innings, their final pair of Tanush Kotian and Tushar Deshpande put together a 232-run partnership, with both making centuries, the second such instance in first-class cricket. The match was called off at tea with Baroda reaching 121 for three in an improbable chase of 606; Mumbai progressed to the semi-final based on first innings lead.

23–27 February 2024
1st Quarter-final
Scorecard

Vidarbha	v	Karnataka
460 (143.1 overs); Atharva Taide 109 (244); Vidwath Kaverappa 4/99 (31.1 overs)		286 (90.3 overs); Nikin Jose 82 (212); Yash Thakur 3/48 (14 overs)
196 (57.2 overs); Dhruv Shorey 57 (98); Vidwath Kaverappa 6/61 (23.2 overs)		243 (62.4 overs); Mayank Agarwal 70 (98); Harsh Dubey 4/65 (13.4 overs)

Vidarbha won by 127 runs
Vidarbha Cricket Association Ground, Nagpur
Umpires: Nand Kishore and Kannur Swaroopanand
Player of the match: Aditya Sarwate (Vidarbha)

- Karnataka won the toss and elected to field.
- Dheeraj Gowda (Karnataka) made his first-class debut.

23–27 February 2024
2nd Quarter-final
Scorecard

Mumbai	v	Baroda
384 (140.4 overs); Musheer Khan 203* (357); Bhargav Bhatt 7/112 (42.4 overs)		348 (110.3 overs); Vishnu Solanki 136 (291); Shams Mulani 4/121 (38 overs)
569 (132 overs); Tushar Deshpande 123 (129); Bhargav Bhatt 7/200 (52 overs)		121/3 (30 overs); Priyanshu Moliya 54 (89); Tanush Kotian 2/16 (6 overs)

Match drawn
Bandra Kurla Complex Ground, Mumbai
Umpires: Sadashiv Iyer and Navdeep Singh
Player of the match: Musheer Khan (Mumbai)

- Mumbai won the toss and elected to bat.
- Raj Limbani (Baroda) made his first-class debut.
- Musheer Khan (Mumbai) scored his maiden century and also double century in first-class cricket.
- Tanush Kotian and Tushar Deshpande (Mumbai) both scored their maiden century in first-class cricket. Deshpande (123) broke Shute Banerjee's record for the highest individual score by an Indian number 11 batter.

23–27 February 2024
3rd Quarter-final
Scorecard

Saurashtra	v	Tamil Nadu
183 (77.1 overs); Harvik Desai 83 (185); R. Sai Kishore 5/66 (32.1 overs)		338 (119.4 overs); Baba Indrajith 80 (139); Chirag Jani 3/22 (14 overs)
122 (75.4 overs); Cheteshwar Pujara 46 (170); R. Sai Kishore 4/27 (26.4 overs)

Tamil Nadu won by an innings and 33 runs
SNR College Cricket Ground, Coimbatore
Umpires: Anil Dandekar and Akshay Totre
Player of the match: R. Sai Kishore (Tamil Nadu)

- Saurashtra won the toss and elected to bat.

23–27 February 2024
4th Quarter-final
Scorecard

Madhya Pradesh	v	Andhra
234 (81.1 overs); Yash Dubey 64 (133); K. V. Sasikanth 4/37 (16 overs)		172 (68.3 overs); Karan Shinde 38 (83); Anubhav Agarwal 3/33 (18 overs)
107 (40.5 overs); Himanshu Mantri 43 (107); Nitish Kumar Reddy 4/28 (10 overs)		165 (69.2 overs); Hanuma Vihari 55 (136); Anubhav Agarwal 6/52 (19 overs)

Madhya Pradesh won by 4 runs
Holkar Cricket Stadium, Indore
Umpires: Anil Chaudhary and Vinod Seshan
Player of the match: Anubhav Agarwal (Madhya Pradesh)

- Madhya Pradesh won the toss and elected to bat.
- Anubhav Agarwal (Madhya Pradesh) registered his career-best figures in first-class cricket (6/52).

=== Semi-finals ===
2–6 March 2024
1st Semi-final
Scorecard

Vidarbha	v	Madhya Pradesh
170 (56.4 overs); Karun Nair 63 (105); Avesh Khan 4/49 (15 overs)		252 (94.3 overs); Himanshu Mantri 126 (265); Umesh Yadav 3/40 (19.3 overs)
402 (101.3 overs); Yash Rathod 141 (200); Anubhav Agarwal 5/92 (18 overs)		258 (81.3 overs); Yash Dubey 94 (212); Yash Thakur 3/60 (12.3 overs)

Vidarbha won by 62 runs
Vidarbha Cricket Association Ground, Nagpur
Umpires: Saidharshan Kumar and Rohan Pandit
Player of the match: Yash Rathod (Vidarbha)

- Vidarbha won the toss and elected to bat.
- Sagar Solanki (Madhya Pradesh) made his first-class debut.

2–6 March 2024
2nd Semi-final
Scorecard

Tamil Nadu	v	Mumbai
146 (64.1 overs); Vijay Shankar 44 (109); Tushar Deshpande 3/24 (12 overs)		378 (106.5 overs); Shardul Thakur 109 (105); R. Sai Kishore 6/99 (38 overs)
162 (51.5 overs); Baba Indrajith 70 (105); Shams Mulani 4/53 (13.5 overs)

Mumbai won by an innings and 70 runs
Bandra Kurla Complex Ground, Mumbai
Umpires: Ulhas Gandhe and Tapan Sharma
Player of the match: Shardul Thakur (Mumbai)

- Tamil Nadu won the toss and elected to bat.
- Shardul Thakur (Mumbai) scored his maiden century in first-class cricket.

=== Final ===
10–14 March 2024
Final
Scorecard

Mumbai	v	Vidarbha
224 (64.3 overs); Shardul Thakur 75 (69); Yash Thakur 3/54 (11 overs)		105 (45.3 overs); Yash Rathod 27 (67); Tanush Kotian 3/7 (4.3 overs)
418 (130.2 overs); Musheer Khan 136 (326); Harsh Dubey 5/144 (48 overs)		368 (134.3 overs); Akshay Wadkar 102 (199); Tanush Kotian 4/95 (39 overs)

Mumbai won by 169 runs
Wankhede Stadium, Mumbai
Umpires: K. N. Ananthapadmanabhan and Saiyed Khalid
Player of the match: Musheer Khan (Mumbai)

- Vidarbha won the toss and elected to field.
- Harsh Dubey (Vidarbha) took his maiden five-wicket haul in first-class cricket.
