= 2021–22 Ranji Trophy Group G =

Cricket tournament

- Dates: 17 February – 26 June 2022
- Administrator(s): BCCI
- Cricket format: First-class cricket
- Tournament format(s): Round-robin then knockout
- Participants: 4

The 2021–22 Ranji Trophy was the 87th season of the Ranji Trophy, the premier first-class cricket tournament in India. It was contested by 38 teams, divided into eight groups, with four teams in Group G. All the Group G league matches took place in Haryana. The tournament was announced by the Board of Control for Cricket in India (BCCI) on 3 July 2021. Uttar Pradesh won Group G to progress to the knockout stage of the tournament.

== Points table ==
Pos	Team	Pld	W	L	T	D	NR	Pts	Quot
1	Uttar Pradesh	3	2	0	0	1	0	13	0.953
2	Vidarbha	3	1	0	0	2	0	12	2.116
3	Maharashtra	3	1	1	0	1	0	8	0.898
4	Assam	3	0	3	0	0	0	0	0.645

Updated to match(es) played on 6 March 2022. Source: ESPN Cricinfo

Advances to Quarter-final

== Fixtures ==
=== Round 1 ===
17–20 February 2022
Scorecard

Uttar Pradesh	v	Vidarbha
301 (96.5 overs); Akshdeep Nath 91 (205); Aditya Sarwate 5/86 (27.5 overs)		548/6d (151 overs); Faiz Fazal 192 (302); Saurabh Kumar 3/160 (50 overs)
280/6 (94.5 overs); Rinku Singh 62* (128); Akshay Wakhare 3/70 (27 overs)

Match drawn
Gurgaon Cricket Ground, Sultanpur
Umpires: Rajeev Godara and Saidharshan Kumar
Player of the match: Faiz Fazal (Vidarbha)

- Uttar Pradesh won the toss and elected to bat.
- Dhruv Jurel and Karan Sharma (Uttar Pradesh) both made their first-class debuts.

17–20 February 2022
Scorecard

Maharashtra	v	Assam
415 (143.3 overs); Pavan Shah 219 (401); Mukhtar Hussain 5/88 (37 overs)		248 (88.2 overs); Riyan Parag 88 (165); Satyajeet Bachhav 4/25 (11.2 overs)
		160 (73 overs) (f/o); Riyan Parag 56 (132); Satyajeet Bachhav 7/45 (24 overs)

Maharashtra won by an innings and 7 runs
Chaudhary Bansi Lal Cricket Stadium, Rohtak
Umpires: Prahlad Rawat and Rajesh Timaney
Player of the match: Pavan Shah (Maharashtra)

- Assam won the toss and elected to field.
- Amlanjyoti Das (Assam), Divyang Hinganekar, Pavan Shah and Yash Nahar (Maharashtra) all made their first-class debuts.
- Pavan Shah (Maharashtra) scored his maiden century in first-class cricket.

=== Round 2 ===
24–27 February 2022
Scorecard

Vidarbha	v	Maharashtra
569/5d (166 overs); Ganesh Satish 275 (482); Mukesh Choudhary 3/101 (32 overs)		328 (146 overs); Naushad Shaikh 103 (196); Aditya Sarwate 6/79 (47 overs)
		69/4 (20.4 overs) (f/o); Azim Kazi 33 (61); Akshay Wakhare 2/23 (7.4 overs)

Match drawn
Gurgaon Cricket Ground, Sultanpur
Umpires: Amit Bansal and Ranjeev Sharma
Player of the match: Ganesh Satish (Vidarbha)

- Vidarbha won the toss and elected to bat.
- Vicky Ostwal (Maharashtra) made his first-class debut.

24–27 February 2022
Scorecard

Assam	v	Uttar Pradesh
265 (81 overs); Riyan Parag 91 (79); Karan Sharma 3/31 (11 overs)		274 (89 overs); Samarth Singh 70 (123); Mukhtar Hussain 3/51 (23 overs)
120 (44.3 overs); Rishav Das 73 (120); Yash Dayal 4/37 (15 overs)		112/4 (38.1 overs); Samarth Singh 51* (123); Hridip Deka 2/27 (11 overs)

Uttar Pradesh won by 6 wickets
Chaudhary Bansi Lal Cricket Stadium, Rohtak
Umpires: Rajeev Godara and Saidharshan Kumar
Player of the match: Samarth Singh (Uttar Pradesh)

- Uttar Pradesh won the toss and elected to field.
- Hridip Deka (Assam) and Shivam Sharma (Uttar Pradesh) both made their first-class debuts.

=== Round 3 ===
3–6 March 2022
Scorecard

Assam	v	Vidarbha
316 (92.1 overs); Riyan Parag 48 (39); Rajneesh Gurbani 5/77 (21.1 Overs)		271 (85 Overs); Faiz Fazal 86 (162); Riyan Parag 5/68 (25 Overs)
110 (37.4 Overs); Swarupam Purkayastha 46 (87); Lalit Yadav 5/77 (11 Overs)		156/5 (42.4 Overs); Faiz Fazal 41 (48); Hridip Deka 4/45 (13.4 Overs)

Vidarbha won by 5 wickets
Chaudhary Bansi Lal Cricket Stadium, Rohtak
Umpires: Prahlad Rawat and Rajesh Timaney
Player of the match: Rajneesh Gurbani (Vidarbha)

- Vidarbha won the toss and elected to field.

3–6 March 2022
Scorecard

Maharashtra	v	Uttar Pradesh
462 (147.1 overs); Ankit Bawne 140 (250); Jasmer Dhankhar 3/83 (16.1 overs)		317 (100 overs); Priyam Garg 156 (253); Satyajeet Bachhav 7/92 (33 overs)
211/5d (39 overs); Rahul Tripathi 123* (110); Ankit Rajpoot 2/43 (10 overs)		359/4 (70.1 overs); Karan Sharma 116 (144); Manoj Ingale 1/21 (3 overs)

Uttar Pradesh won by 6 wickets
Gurgaon Cricket Ground, Sultanpur
Umpires: Amit Bansal and Ranjeev Sharma
Player of the match: Rinku Singh (Uttar Pradesh)

- Maharashtra won the toss and elected to bat.
