= JSS Academy of Technical Education =

JSS Academy of Technical Education may refer to:

- J.S.S. Academy of Technical Education, Bangalore
- J.S.S. Academy of Technical Education, Noida
