= KSCA =

KSCA may refer to:

- Karnataka State Cricket Association in Karnataka, India
  - M. Chinnaswamy Stadium or Karnataka State Cricket Association Stadium, a cricket ground in Bengaluru, Karnataka
  - KSCA Stadium, a cricket ground in Belagavi, Karnataka
- KSCA (FM), a radio station (101.9 FM) licensed to Glendale, California, United States
- Knights of the Southern Cross Australia, a Catholic fraternal order
- Kilogram per square centimeter absolute, a unit of pressure
- Knight of the Society for Creative Anachronism, the order of chivalry peerage within the Society, a medieval re-creation organization
- Kalinga Institute of Industrial Technology School of Computer Application
