= Pratham Singh =

Indian cricketer (born 1992)

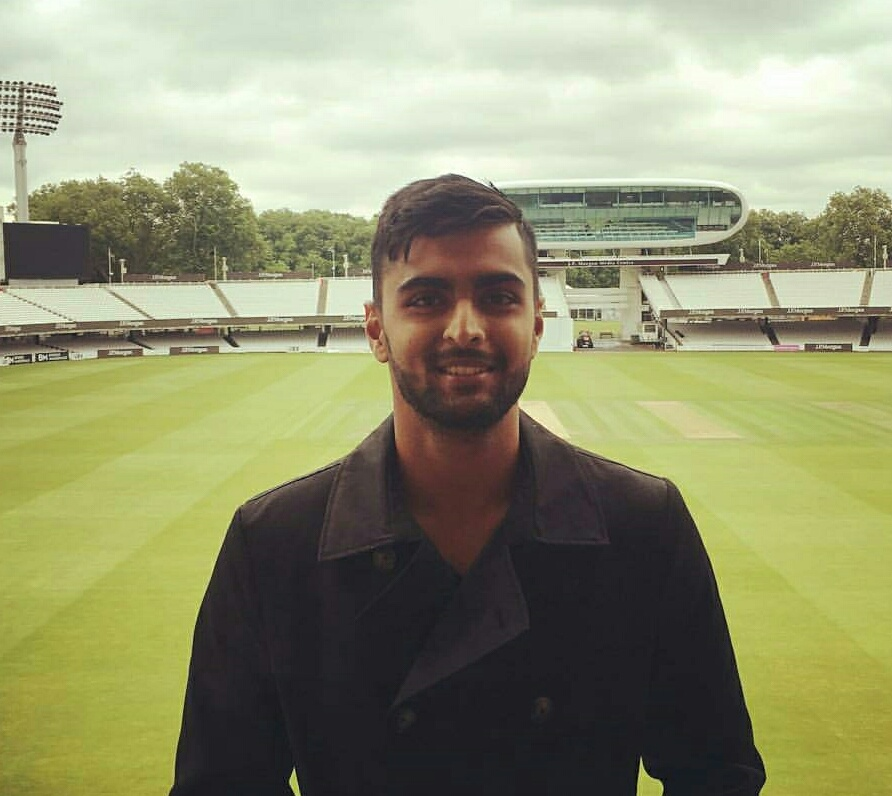

Personal information
- Born: 31 August 1992 (age 34); Delhi, India
- Batting: Left-handed
- Role: Top-order batter

Domestic team information
- Years: Team
- 2017-present: Railways
- 2024: India A cricket team

Career statistics
Competition	FC	LA	T20
Matches	37	28	44
Runs scored	1,811	1,097	1,213
Batting average	30.69	40.62	29.58
100s/50s	2/10	2/8	0/9
Top score	169*	129	89
Balls bowled	102	32	0
Wickets	2	0	0
Bowling average	48.00	–	–
5 wickets in innings	0	–	–
10 wickets in match	0	–	–
Best bowling	1/34	–	–
Catches/stumpings	22/–	7/–	14/–
- Source: ESPNcricinfo, 26 February 2025

Pratham Singh (born 31 August 1992) is an Indian cricketer. He is a left-handed opening batter who plays for Railways in domestic cricket and was part of the Kolkata Knight Riders squad for the 2022 edition of the Indian Premier League.

He made his List A debut for Railways in the 2016–17 Vijay Hazare Trophy on 26 February 2017. He made his first-class debut for Railways in the 2017–18 Ranji Trophy on 9 November 2017. He made his Twenty20 debut for Railways in the 2018–19 Syed Mushtaq Ali Trophy on 21 February 2019. Pratham was appointed as the captain of the Railways squad for the 2024–25 Ranji Trophy season in 2024.

== Early life and education ==
Pratham was born on 31 August 1992 and currently lives in Delhi. He obtained his Bachelor of Technology in Electronics and Communication from J.S.S. Academy of Technical Education in 2015. He got an admission in Indian School of Business, Hyderabad for post graduate program in 2022 which he deferred.

== Cricketing career ==
Pratham is a left-handed opening batsman and right-handed off spinner. In 2017, he made his debut in List A cricket and represented Railways in the 2016–17 Vijay Hazare Trophy. He scored 73 runs off 154 balls in his Ranji Trophy debut against Maharashtra. In 2017, Pratham was bought by Gujarat Lions in the 2017 IPL auction. He was the 3rd highest run-scorer in India in the 2018–19 Syed Mushtaq Ali Trophy, with 438 runs in 10 innings averaging 54.75. Pratham set a record by scoring 4 consecutive fifties in the Syed Mushtaq Ali Trophy.

He was the highest scorer for Railways in 2020–21 Vijay Hazare Trophy with a total of 299 runs with a highest of 127 against Karnataka averaging 74.75. In February 2022, he was bought by the Kolkata Knight Riders for INR 20 lakh in the auction for the 2022 Indian Premier League tournament. He was also selected to represent the Central Zone in 2023 for the Deodhar Trophy.

In February 2024, Pratham scored an unbeaten 169 off 300 balls that included 16 boundaries and one six, in a 378-run chase against Tripura in Agartala during the 2023–24 Ranji Trophy, and was named Man of the Match in the highest ever run chase in the 90 years history of Ranji Trophy. In this 89th Ranji Trophy season, held from January 5 to March 14, 2024, he was the top run-scorer for Railways, with 530 runs in 12 innings at an average of 48.18, with 169 as his highest score.

After scoring two centuries—130 against Gujarat and 143 against the TNCA President's XI—in the Buchi Babu Tournament, Pratham was selected for the India A team in the second round of the Duleep Trophy. He joined as a replacement when captain Shubman Gill was called up to the Indian Test squad for the Bangladesh series. Pratham made his debut with a century, scoring 122 off 189 balls (12 fours, 1 six) against India D in a second-round match at the Rural Development Trust Stadium. In October 2024, Railways named Pratham as captain of its squad for the 2024–25 Ranji Trophy season.
