= RMIT School of Business IT and Logistics =

Coordinates: 37°48′28″S 144°57′48″E

School of Business IT and Logistics
- Parent institution: College of Business, Royal Melbourne Institute of Technology
- Head: Professor Caroline Chan
- Campus: City, Vietnam
- Website: School of Business IT and Logistics

RMIT's School of Business IT and Logistics (also referred to as SBITL) is an Australian tertiary education school within the College of Business at the Royal Melbourne Institute of Technology (RMIT University), located in Melbourne, Victoria.

== History ==
SBITL has been a part of RMIT for more than 20 years. The Master of Business (IT) program has been delivered in Singapore for 20 years and it is likely that it has been delivered for more than that at their campus in Melbourne.

== Student clubs ==
The school recognises two student societies falling under its academics. The Business Information Systems Students Association serves as the academic society for the information systems students, and the Supply Chain Student Association serves the logistics & supply chain management students. Both societies are affiliates of the RMIT Business Student Association.

== Location ==
SBITL is located in building 80.

== Programs ==
SBITL offers programs from undergraduate to doctor levels, most of the programs are delivered at the RMIT University City Campus. Some of the programs are delivered at the RMIT University International Campus Vietnam.

== Industry links ==
SBITL has strong links to the industry with partners including IBM Australia, GS1 Australia, Ernst & Young and SAP. Partners contribute differently. Examples include guest lectures from Ernst & Young and IBM Australia for research and education purposes. SBIT also have relationships with other professional associations such as AIS, ACS and ALIA.

In 2005, RMIT was the winner of the 2005 Microsoft Windows ChallengE contest, with the "EverGreen" project.
