= Kilco Marak =

Indian cricketer (born 1992)

Personal information
- Born: 27 July 1992 (age 34); Tura, Meghalaya
- Source: ESPNcricinfo, 9 November 2019

Kilco Marak (born 27 July 1992) is an Indian cricketer. He made his Twenty20 debut on 9 November 2019, for Meghalaya in the 2019–20 Syed Mushtaq Ali Trophy. He made his first-class debut on 24 February 2022, for Meghalaya in the 2021–22 Ranji Trophy.
