= Anshul Kamboj =

Indian cricketer (born 2000)

- Kamboj playing for India in 2026

Personal information
- Born: 6 December 2000 (age 25); Karnal, Haryana, India
- Height: 1.87 m (6 ft 2 in)
- Batting: Right-handed
- Bowling: Right-arm medium
- Role: Bowling all-rounder

International information
- National side: India
- Only Test (cap 318): 23 July 2025 v England
- ODI debut (cap 266): 3 October 2026 v West Indies
- Last ODI: 4 November 2026 v New Zealand

Domestic team information
- Years: Team
- 2021/22–present: Haryana
- 2024: Mumbai Indians
- 2025–present: Chennai Super Kings

Career statistics
Competition	Test	FC	LA	T20
Matches	1	40	37	55
Runs scored	0	782	99	153
Batting average	0.00	15.03	8.25	17.00
100s/50s	0/0	0/2	0/0	0/0
Top score	0	60	19*	19*
Balls bowled	108	5,923	1,758	1,079
Wickets	1	126	58	76
Bowling average	89.00	23.30	23.43	20.92
5 wickets in innings	0	2	0	0
10 wickets in match	0	1	0	0
Best bowling	1/89	10/49	4/22	4/23
Catches/stumpings	0/–	12/–	12/-	15/–
- Source: Cricinfo, 5 November 2026

Anshul Kamboj (born 6 December 2000) is an Indian international cricketer who plays for India national cricket team as a right-handed medium pace bowling all-rounder and plays for Haryana in domestic cricket. He made his Indian Premier League debut for Mumbai Indians in 2024 and currently plays for Chennai Super Kings. He made his International Test debut against England during the fourth test of 2025 Anderson–Tendulkar Trophy at Old Trafford Cricket Ground .

In October 2024, he was also part of the India A team's squad for the 2024 ACC Emerging Teams Asia Cup. He made his first-class debut on 17 February 2022, for Haryana in the 2021–22 Ranji Trophy. He made his Twenty20 debut on 22 October 2022, for Haryana in the 2022–23 Syed Mushtaq Ali Trophy. He made his List A cricket debut on 15 November 2022, for Haryana in the 2022–23 Vijay Hazare Trophy. He was sold to Chennai Super Kings for 3.4 crore in the IPL 2025 Mega Auction.

== Domestic career ==
Kamboj made his debut for Haryana in February 2022 versus Tripura in the Ranji Trophy. However, he has shown prowess in limited overs cricket, with 7 wickets in 7 matches in the 2022–23 Syed Mushtaq Ali Trophy, and 17 wickets in 10 matches for Haryana in the 2023–24 Vijay Hazare Trophy, with him playing a big role in Haryana lifting the title. These performances helped him get bought by the Mumbai Indians in the 2024 Indian Premier League Auction. He also attracted attention in the first class circuit, getting selected for the 2024–25 Duleep Trophy. He represented India C, taking 16 wickets in 3 matches at an average of 17.12 and was adjudged Player of the Tournament. In November 2024, Kamboj became the third bowler to take all ten wickets in an innings in the Ranji Trophy, doing so for Haryana against Kerala.

== International career ==
Kamboj playing a Test match for India against New Zealand in November 2026

Kamboj was added to the Indian squad and playing 11 ahead of the fourth Test of the 2025 Anderson-Tendulkar Trophy, due to the injuries of other players. He got his first Test International wicket of Ben Duckett in this match. On October 16, 2026, Kamboj was named to the Indian test squad touring New Zealand.
