= Malliksab Sirur =

Indian cricketer (born 1993)

Personal information
- Full name: Malliksab Gulamsab Sirur
- Born: 21 January 1993 (age 33); Hubli, Karnataka, India
- Batting: Right-handed
- Bowling: Right arm offbreak
- Role: Allrounder

Domestic team information
- Years: Team
- 2016–17: Goa
- Source: ESPNcricinfo, 26 February 2017

Malliksab Sirur (born 21 January 1993) is an Indian cricketer. He made his List A debut for Goa in the 2016–17 Vijay Hazare Trophy on 26 February 2017. He made his Twenty20 debut for Goa in the 2018–19 Syed Mushtaq Ali Trophy on 27 February 2019. He made his first-class debut on 3 March 2022, for Goa in the 2021–22 Ranji Trophy.
