= Sidak Singh =

Indian cricketer (born 1999)

Personal information
- Full name: Sidak Gurvinder Singh
- Born: 17 May 1999 (age 27); Varanasi, Uttar Pradesh, India
- Batting: Left-handed
- Bowling: Slow left-arm orthodox
- Role: Bowler

Domestic team information
- Years: Team
- 2015: Mumbai
- Source: Cricinfo, 4 November 2018

Sidak Singh (born 17 May 1999) is an Indian cricketer. A slow left-arm orthodox spinner, Singh made his competitive cricket debut for Mumbai at the age of 15 in March 2015 after impressive performances in the under-15 and under-19 age-group levels. He thus became the youngest player to debut for Mumbai since Sachin Tendulkar.

After including Singh in Mumbai squad for the 2014–15 Syed Mushtaq Ali Trophy in March 2015, the Mumbai Cricket Association selector Milind Rege remarked, "I am utmost impressed. We were looking for someone like him to take Mumbai cricket forward. We played him in two trial matches to pick the Mumbai team. I asked the captain of the team to bowl him in the power play overs and I think he fulfilled what we were looking for. He’s accurate, a brilliant fielder and has the cricketing IQ." In November 2018, playing as an outstation player for Puducherry in the U-23 Col CK Nayudu Trophy, Singh picked up all the 10 wickets in an innings against Manipur.

He made his first-class debut on 24 February 2022, for Puducherry in the 2021–22 Ranji Trophy.
