= Yuvraj Singh (cricketer, born 1998) =

Indian cricketer (born 1998)

Personal information
- Born: 22 August 1998 (age 28); Bareilly, Uttar Pradesh, India
- Source: Cricinfo, 18 January 2021

Yuvraj Singh (born 22 August 1998) is an Indian cricketer who plays for Railways. Singh was a former captain of the under-19 team, before being selected to play for the senior team. Mainly known for his bowling, Singh made his Twenty20 debut on 18 January 2021, for Railways in the 2020–21 Syed Mushtaq Ali Trophy. He made his first-class debut on 17 February 2022, for Railways in the 2021–22 Ranji Trophy, where he took a five-wicket haul.
