= Priyesh Patel =

Indian cricketer (born 2001)

Personal information
- Born: 16 October 2001 (age 25); Pij, Gujarat, India
- Batting: Right-handed
- Source: Cricinfo, 14 January 2021

Priyesh Patel (born 16 October 2001) is an Indian cricketer. He made his Twenty20 debut on 14 January 2021, for Gujarat in the 2020–21 Syed Mushtaq Ali Trophy. He made his first-class debut on 3 March 2022, for Gujarat in the 2021–22 Ranji Trophy.
