= Jehu Anderson =

Indian cricketer (born 1999)

Personal information
- Born: 12 November 1999 (age 27); Aizawl, Mizoram, India
- Batting: Right-handed
- Bowling: Wicketkeeper

Domestic team information
- Years: Team
- 2022-present: Mizoram

Career statistics
Competition	FC	LA	T20
Matches	22	20	20
Runs scored	837	262	399
Batting average	23.9	13.1	21.0
100s/50s	1/5	0/0	0/1
Top score	100*	38	82*
Balls bowled	-		-
Wickets	-		-
Bowling average	-		-
5 wickets in innings	-	0	-
10 wickets in match	-	0	-
Best bowling	-	0	-
Catches/stumpings	-		-
- Source: ESPNcricinfo, 21 January 2026

Jehu Anderson (born 12 November 1999) is an Indian cricketer. He made his first-class debut for Mizoram in the 2022–23 Ranji Trophy on 13 December 2022. Anderson made his Twenty20 debut for Mizoram in the 2023–24 Syed Mushtaq Ali Trophy on 16 October 2023.

Anderson scored 64 runs from 96 balls in the 2025–26 Duleep Trophy.
