= Manav Suthar =

Indian cricketer (born 2002)

Personal information
- Full name: Manav Jagdusakumar Suthar
- Born: 3 August 2002 (age 24); Sri Ganganagar, Rajasthan, India
- Batting: Left-handed
- Bowling: Slow left-arm orthodox spin
- Role: Bowling all-rounder

International information
- National side: India (2026–present)
- Test debut (cap 319): 6 June 2026 v Afghanistan
- Last Test: 23 August 2026 v Sri Lanka

Domestic team information
- Years: Team
- 2022–present: Rajasthan
- 2024–present: Gujarat Titans
- 2026: Warwickshire

Career statistics
Competition	Test	FC	LA	T20
Matches	3	38	25	29
Runs scored	79	1,175	350	94
Batting average	19.75	24.47	19.44	10.44
100s/50s	0/0	1/6	0/1	0/0
Top score	28	120	57	16*
Balls bowled	842	8,765	1,375	502
Wickets	23	179	34	25
Bowling average	17.34	23.80	29.73	24.56
5 wickets in innings	2	9	0	0
10 wickets in match	1	4	–	–
Best bowling	6/33	8/33	3/32	3/21
Catches/stumpings	4/–	17/–	6/–	7/–
- Source: Cricinfo, 26 September 2026

Manav Jagdusakumar Suthar (born 3 August 2002) is an Indian cricketer who plays for the Indian national team. He is a bowling all-rounder, who bats left-handed and bowls slow left-arm orthodox spin. He represents Rajasthan in domestic cricket and Gujarat Titans in the Indian Premier League.

== Career ==
Suthar made his first-class debut against Andhra in the 2021–22 Ranji Trophy on 17 February 2022. He made his T20 debut against Madhya Pradesh on 11 October 2022 in the 2022–23 Syed Mushtaq Ali Trophy.

In July 2023, he was named in India A squad for the 2023 ACC Emerging Teams Asia Cup. He made his List A debut for India A against UAE A in the ACC Emerging Teams Asia Cup.

He also played for Gujarat Titans in the 2024 Indian Premier League. In September 2024, he was named in India C squad for the 2024–25 Duleep Trophy. He played a 82 run innings against India B. He also took 7 wickets in an innings against India D in the tournament.

On his Test debut in June 2026 against Afghanistan at the New Chandigarh stadium, Suthar took 6 wickets for 33 runs in the first innings, and he received the player of the match award. The same month, Suthar signed with Warwickshire to play two matches in the county championship. He finished the county stint with 11 wickets, including a maiden five-fer.

Suthar is back with Warwickshire Bears playing in 2026 The Championship run in.
