= Musaif Ajaz =

Indian cricketer (born 2002)

Personal information
- Born: 3 August 2002 (age 24); Jammu, Jammu and Kashmir, India
- Batting: Right handed
- Bowling: Slow Left arm Orthodox

Domestic team information
- Years: Team
- 2018/19–present: Jammu and Kashmir

Career statistics
Competition	FC	LA
Matches	9	5
Runs scored	310	52
Batting average	25.83	13.00
100s/50s	0/1	0/0
Top score	89	27
Catches/stumpings	4/–	3/–
- Source: ESPNcricinfo, 9 April 2025

Musaif Ajaz (born 3 August 2002) is an Indian cricketer. He made his first-class debut for Jammu & Kashmir in the 2018–19 Ranji Trophy on 30 December 2018.
