= Kanhaiya Wadhawan =

Indian cricketer (born 2001)

Personal information
- Full name: Kanhaiya Wadhawan
- Born: 27 September 2001 (age 25); Jammu, India

Domestic team information
- Years: Team
- 2018–present: Jammu & Kashmir
- Source: Cricinfo, 12 August 2026

Kanhaiya Wadhawan (born 27 September 2001) is an Indian cricketer. He made his first-class debut for Jammu & Kashmir in the 2018–19 Ranji Trophy on 30 December 2018.
