= Het Patel =

Indian cricketer (born 1998)

Personal information
- Full name: Het Jignesh Patel
- Born: 13 October 1998 (age 28); Ahmedabad, Gujarat, India
- Batting: Right-handed
- Role: Wicket-keeper

Domestic team information
- Years: Team
- 2017–present: Gujarat
- Source: Cricinfo, 1 November 2017

Het Jignesh Patel (born 13 October 1998) is a Gujarati cricketer. He played 4 matches as a wicket-keeper for India Under-19 in the 2016 Asia cup.

Patel was also in the Gujarat squad selected to play against Rest of India for 2016–17 Irani cup but did not make it to the playing XI. He made his List A debut for Gujarat in the 2016–17 Vijay Hazare Trophy on 25 February 2017. He made his Twenty20 debut on 4 November 2021, for Gujarat in the 2021–22 Syed Mushtaq Ali Trophy. He made his first-class debut on 17 February 2022, for Gujarat in the 2021–22 Ranji Trophy.
