= Mohit Raut =

Indian cricketer (born 1998)

Personal information
- Born: 20 January 1998 (age 27)

Domestic team information
- Years: Team
- 2021: Vidarbha
- 2022-present: Railways
- Source: ESPNcricinfo, 15 January 2021

Mohit Raut (born 20 January 1998) is an Indian cricketer. He made his Twenty20 debut on 15 January 2021, for Vidarbha in the 2020–21 Syed Mushtaq Ali Trophy.
