= J.S.S. Academy of Technical Education, Bengaluru =

Engineering college in Bengaluru, India

Coordinates: 12°54′7.53″N 77°30′17.05″E

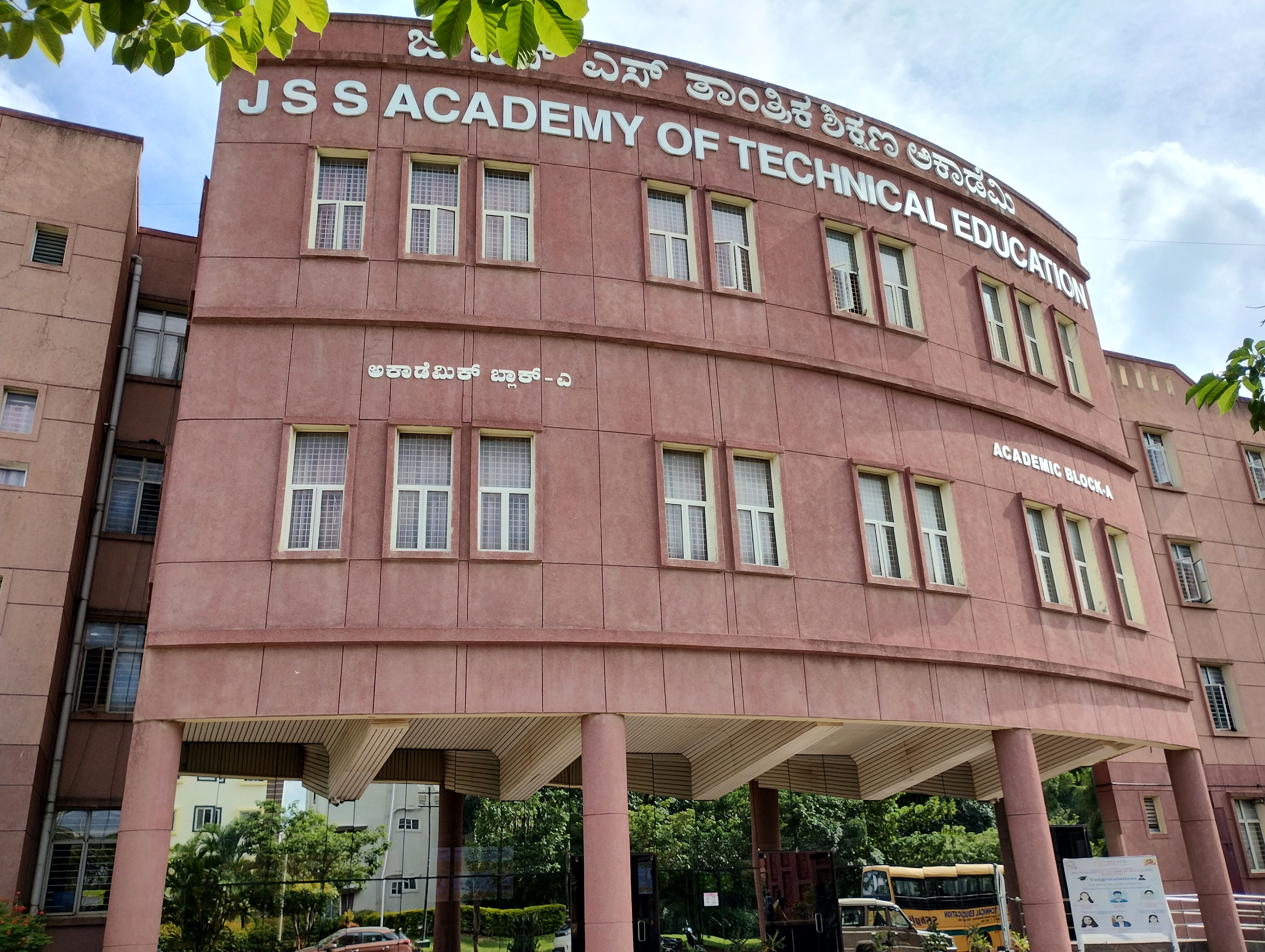
- J.S.S.A.T.E. in 2025
- Motto in English: To offer quality education is engineering, technology and management.
- Type: Private Higher Education Institute
- Established: 1997
- Affiliations: Visvesvaraya Technological University
- Principal: Dr. Bhimasen Soragaon
- Undergraduates: 3000+
- Postgraduates: 300+
- Location: Bangalore, Karnataka, India
- Campus: 21.17 Acres; urban, 21 acres (0.085 km^{2})
- Website: jssateb.ac.in

J.S.S. Academy of Technical Education, Bengaluru (JSSATEB), or in its full name Jagadguru Sri Shivarathreeshwara Academy of Technical Education, Bengaluru, is an engineering college in Bangalore, India established in 1997 and managed by JSS Mahavidyapeetha, Mysore.

== Campus ==
The campus is located on a hilly 21-acre campus on the Uttarahalli-Kengeri main road near Rajarajeshwari Nagar on the southwestern edge of Bangalore City.

== Academics ==
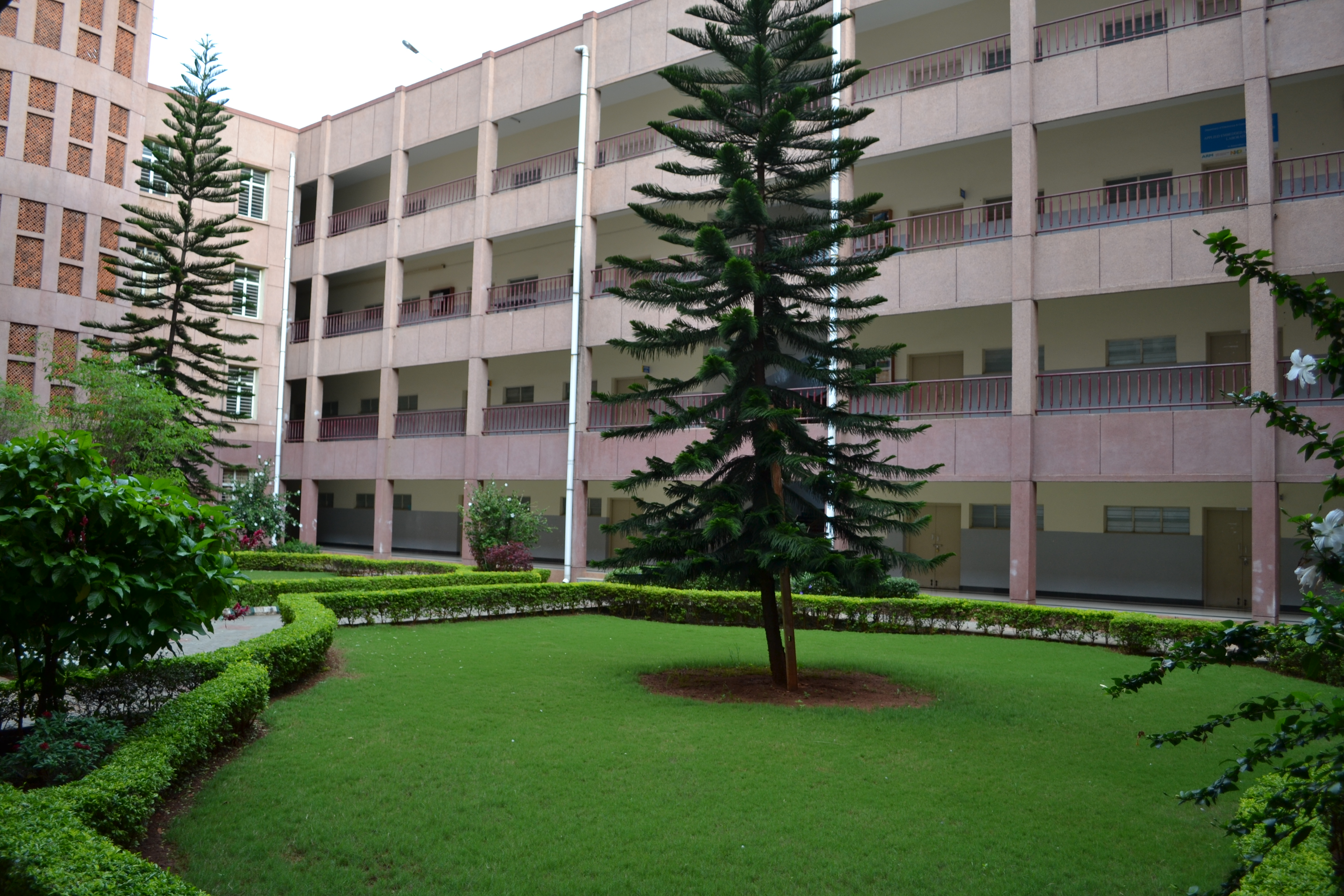
Main block

JSS Academy of Technical Education, Bengaluru is approved by the All India Council for Technical Education, New Delhi. The institute is accredited with A+ grade by NAAC and the validity is till November 2027. Two UG engineering programs are accredited by National Board of Accreditation. The institute is affiliated with Visvesvaraya Technological University, Belagavi, Karnataka, India.

JSS Academy of Technical Education, Bengaluru offers eight undergraduate (B.E) and two postgraduate (M.Tech) programs in engineering & technology; MBA, MCA, and research programs in Engineering, Science and Management. All the departments are recognized as Research Centres by the affiliating university. The institute has a student strength of more than 3000. The total faculty strength is 160 out of which 92 are doctorates and the remaining are pursuing their doctoral degrees in different domains.

== Students' achievements ==
- In June 2005 - team 'Famous Four' from the Department of Computer Science and Engineering was among the finalists representing India out of a total of 278 worldwide teams in the Windows ChallengE (Organized by Microsoft in association with the Computer Society of the IEEE). The final event was conducted in Microsoft's Redmond, Washington campus. The team's idea (named after Nightingale) was based upon a novel approach to the 'Emergency Medical Response system'.
- In May 2010, Team Agni from the Departments of Mechanical Engineering and Industrial Engineering participated in the Formula SAE in Michigan and was one of two teams from India.

== See also ==
- JSSATE Noida
