= Abhinav Puri =

Indian cricketer (born 1994)

Personal information
- Born: 22 July 1994 (age 32); Jammu, India
- Source: ESPNcricinfo, 13 December 2015

Abhinav Puri (born 22 July 1994) is an Indian cricketer who plays for Jammu and Kashmir. He made his first-class debut on 23 November 2015 in the 2015–16 Ranji Trophy.
