= KSCA Stadium =

Cricket ground

Ground information
- Location: Belagavi, Karnataka
- Country: India
- Establishment: 2016/17 (first recorded match)

Team information
Karnataka
- As of 8 December 2016; Source: Ground profile

The KSCA Stadium (Karnataka State Cricket Association Stadium) is a cricket ground in Belagavi, India. The first recorded match on the ground was in 2016/17. It was used as a venue for two first-class matches in the 2016–17 Ranji Trophy, both featuring Gujarat. In the first of those matches, Priyank Panchal scored a triple-century, when he made 314 not out.

== See also ==
- List of cricket grounds in India
