= Satyajeet Bachhav =

Indian cricketer (born 1992)

Personal information
- Full name: Satyajeet Sunil Bachhav
- Born: 28 November 1992 (age 33); Nashik, Maharashtra, India
- Batting: Right-handed
- Bowling: Slow left arm orthodox
- Source: ESPNcricinfo, 20 November 2016

Satyajeet Bachhav (born 28 November 1992) is an Indian cricketer. He made his Twenty20 debut for Maharashtra in the 2015–16 Syed Mushtaq Ali Trophy on 3 January 2016. He made his List A debut for Maharashtra in the 2016–17 Vijay Hazare Trophy on 4 March 2017.

He was the joint-leading wicket-taker for Maharashtra in the 2018–19 Vijay Hazare Trophy, with fifteen dismissals in eight matches. He was also the leading wicket-taker for Maharashtra in the 2018–19 Ranji Trophy, with 28 dismissals in seven matches. He finished the 2018–19 Syed Mushtaq Ali Trophy as the leading wicket-taker in the tournament, with twenty dismissals in twelve matches.
