= Rural Development Trust Stadium =

Cricket ground

- Interactive map of Rural Development Trust Stadium
- Location: Anantapur, Andhra Pradesh, India
- Country: India
- Coordinates: 14.6388°N 77.6198°E
- Establishment: 2004
- Capacity: 5,000
- Owner: Rural Development Trust
- Operator: Rural Development Trust
- Tenants: Andhra cricket team
- Last used: 2018
- As of 9 April 2023; Source: Cricinfo

Rural Development Trust Stadium is a cricket ground in Anantapur, Andhra Pradesh, India. The stadium comes with all necessary modern facilities, having been built and maintained by the Rural Development Trust. It was used as the home ground for Andhra cricket team. The first recorded match on this ground was played between Andhra and Railways, on 22 December 2004 in the 2004–05 Ranji Trophy. It hosted Ranji Trophy matches between 2004 and 2018. It had also hosted Women's List A matches in the Women's Senior One Day Trophy in 2007 and 2008. Annual school competitions are also held at this ground.
