= Manan Hingrajia =

Indian cricketer (born 1998)

Personal information
- Full name: Manan Ashokkumar Hingrajia
- Born: 17 February 1998 (age 28); Ahmedabad, Gujarat, India
- Batting: Left-handed
- Bowling: Right arm offbreak

Domestic team information
- Years: Team
- 2019/20–present: Gujarat

Career statistics
Competition	First-class	List A
Matches	24	2
Runs scored	1,379	2
Batting average	40.55	1.00
100s/50s	3/7	0/0
Top score	181	2
Balls bowled	276	–
Wickets	4	–
Bowling average	38.50	–
5 wickets in innings	0	–
10 wickets in match	0	–
Best bowling	2/22	–
Catches/stumpings	28/–	0/–
- Source: ESPNcricinfo, 24 March 2025

Manan Hingrajia (born 17 February 1998) is an Indian cricketer. He won M.A. Chidambaram trophy – Highest run getter in (U23) Col. CK Nayadu Trophy in 2018–19.He made his List A debut on 24 September 2019, for Gujarat in the 2019–20 Vijay Hazare Trophy. He made his first-class debut on 3 March 2022, for Gujarat in the 2021–22 Ranji Trophy. He led Gujarat team in winning the Men's U25 State A Trophy 2021–22.
