= Windows ChallengE =

Programming competition

Windows ChallengE was a programming competition run by Microsoft Corporation. The contest is composed of teams of 3 or 4 students at colleges/universities from around the world, along with a faculty mentor. The only requirement of the contest is that the teams utilize the hardware provided to them (an eBoxII from ICOPTech), as well as build a customized image of the Windows CE operating system.

The first Windows ChallengE was held in 2004, consisting of less than 30 teams within the United States. The goal was to use Windows CE to "Make the World a Safer Place". James Madison University won the contest, led by students Marcus O'Malley, Joshua Blake, Justin Creasy and Kevin Ferrell. Computer science professor Ramon A. Mata-Toledo served as team adviser. Their winning project was an airport security checkpoint device designed to help protect the millions of people who fly daily. The mobile handheld device collects information from a passenger's boarding pass and uses a chemical sniffer to sense and identify potential high-security risks posed by baggage or passengers.

In 2005, it was opened to the rest of the world. 278 teams from all over the world participated. The winner of the 2005 contest was the team from the Royal Melbourne Institute of Technology (RMIT), Australia, with the "EverGreen" project.

In 2006 more than 300 teams registered for the contest. The final was held in Redmond, WA, at the Microsoft Campus. In the finals, only 20 teams participated, among which only 12 made it to the last day of the competition. The 44Tech team of Romania won the contest with their project "Forest Watcher". That team was composed of Cristian Pop, Ioana Bratie, Omar Choudary and Mircea Gheorghe.

In 2007 the contest became part of the Imagine Cup. Imagine Cup is a bigger competition, also organized by Microsoft, which is composed of several competition tracks, including algorithms, photography, and embedded software.
