= 2021–22 Ranji Trophy =

Cricket tournament

- The Ranji Trophy, awarded to the winners
- Dates: 17 February – 26 June 2022
- Administrator: BCCI
- Cricket format: First-class cricket
- Tournament format: Round-robin then knockout
- Host: India
- Champions: Madhya Pradesh (1st title)
- Runners-up: Mumbai
- Participants: 38
- Matches: 65
- Player of the series: Sarfaraz Khan (Mumbai)
- Most runs: Sarfaraz Khan (982) (Mumbai)
- Most wickets: Shams Mulani (45) (Mumbai)

The 2021–22 Ranji Trophy was the 87th season of the Ranji Trophy, the premier first-class cricket tournament in India. The tournament was split into two phases, with the league stage being played from 17 February to 15 March 2022, and the knockout phase played from 6 to 26 June 2022. Due to the delayed start of the tournament because of the COVID-19 pandemic, teams were split into eight Elite groups, instead of five as per previous editions, and the Plate Group. The seven teams that won their Elite Group with the best points progressed to the knockout phase. They were joined by the winner of the pre-quarter-final match between the Elite Group winning team with the fewest points and the winner of the Plate Group.

In the opening round of fixtures, Sakibul Gani of Bihar became the first player to score a triple century on their first-class debut. In their Plate Group match against Mizoram, he scored 341 runs.

Following the conclusion of the group stage, Madhya Pradesh, Bengal, Karnataka, Mumbai, Uttarakhand, Punjab and Uttar Pradesh had all won their respective groups to qualify for the quarter-finals. Jharkhand won Group H and Nagaland won the Plate Group to advance to the preliminary quarter-final match. In the first innings of the preliminary quarter-final, Jharkhand were bowled out for 880 runs, the fourth-highest team total in the Ranji Trophy. Jharkhand then extended their lead to 1,008 runs, the biggest ever lead in first-class cricket, progressing to the quarter-finals based on their first innings lead. Mumbai, Uttar Pradesh and Madhya Pradesh all won their quarter-final matches to advance to the semi-finals. Bengal also reached the semi-finals, after they drew their match against Jharkhand, progressing in the tournament due to having a first-innings lead.

In the first semi-final, Madhya Pradesh beat Bengal by 174 runs to reach their first final in the tournament since the 1998–99 edition. The second semi-final, between Mumbai and Uttar Pradesh was drawn, with Mumbai advancing to the final on their first-innings lead. In the final, Madhya Pradesh beat Mumbai by six wickets to win their first Ranji Trophy title. (Note: Madhya Pradesh previously competed in the Ranji Trophy as Holkar cricket team, winning the tournament four times between 1945–46 and 1952–53. This was their first win as Madhya Pradesh.) It qualified for the 2023-24 Irani Cup.

== Background ==
The 2021–22 Ranji Trophy was initially scheduled to take place from 13 January to 20 March 2022. The previous edition of the tournament was cancelled due to the COVID-19 pandemic. However, on 4 January 2022, the Board of Control for Cricket in India (BCCI) confirmed that the tournament had been postponed due to an increase of COVID-19 cases in India. The BCCI announced that they would try to host the league stage of the Ranji Trophy before the start of the 2022 Indian Premier League in April. Later in January 2022, the BCCI said that they were looking at the possibility of holding the tournament in two phases, from February to March, and June to July.

Originally, the tournament was scheduled to start on 16 November 2021, but was later postponed to 5 January 2022 and again to 13 January 2022. As per previous editions, the tournament would have been divided into six groups, with six teams in five Elite Groups and eight teams in the Plate Group. The winners of each Elite Group would have progressed directly to the quarter-finals, with the second-placed teams and the winner of the Plate Group playing in pre-quarters matches to determine the final eight teams.

== Teams ==
The teams were placed in the following groups:

Group A (Rajkot)	Group B (Cuttack)	Group C (Chennai)	Group D (Ahmedabad)	Group E (Trivandrum)
Gujarat; Kerala; Madhya Pradesh; Meghalaya	Bengal; Baroda; Hyderabad; Chandigarh	Jammu & Kashmir; Karnataka; Pondicherry; Railways	Goa; Mumbai; Odisha; Saurashtra	Andhra; Rajasthan; Services; Uttarakhand
Group F (Delhi)	Group G (Haryana)	Group H (Guwahati)	Plate Group (Kolkata)	
Haryana; Himachal Pradesh; Punjab; Tripura	Assam; Maharashtra; Uttar Pradesh; Vidarbha	Chhattisgarh; Delhi; Jharkhand; Tamil Nadu	Arunachal Pradesh; Bihar; Manipur; Mizoram; Nagaland; Sikkim	

== League stage ==
=== Group A ===
Pos	Team	Pld	W	L	T	D	NR	Pts	Quot
1	Madhya Pradesh	3	2	0	0	1	0	14	2.147
2	Kerala	3	2	0	0	1	0	14	1.648
3	Gujarat	3	1	2	0	0	0	7	1.105
4	Meghalaya	3	0	3	0	0	0	0	0.234

Updated to match(es) played on 6 March 2022. Source: ESPN Cricinfo

Advances to Quarter-final
Relegated to Plate Group next season

=== Group B ===
Pos	Team	Pld	W	L	T	D	NR	Pts	Quot
1	Bengal	3	3	0	0	0	0	18	1.308
2	Hyderabad	3	2	1	0	0	0	12	1.196
3	Baroda	3	0	2	0	1	0	3	0.938
4	Chandigarh	3	0	2	0	1	0	1	0.694

Updated to match(es) played on 6 March 2022. Source: ESPN Cricinfo

Advances to Quarter-final

=== Group C ===
Pos	Team	Pld	W	L	T	D	NR	Pts	Quot
1	Karnataka	3	2	0	0	1	0	16	1.681
2	Railways	3	1	0	0	2	0	10	1.324
3	Jammu & Kashmir	3	1	2	0	0	0	6	0.782
4	Pondicherry	3	0	2	0	1	0	1	0.548

Updated to match(es) played on 6 March 2022. Source: ESPN Cricinfo

Advances to Quarter-final

=== Group D ===
Pos	Team	Pld	W	L	T	D	NR	Pts	Quot
1	Mumbai	3	2	0	0	1	0	16	1.893
2	Saurashtra	3	2	0	0	1	0	14	1.441
3	Odisha	3	0	2	0	1	0	3	0.453
4	Goa	3	0	2	0	1	0	1	0.791

Updated to match(es) played on 6 March 2022. Source: ESPN Cricinfo

Advances to Quarter-final

=== Group E ===
Pos	Team	Pld	W	L	T	D	NR	Pts	Quot
1	Uttarakhand	3	2	1	0	0	0	12	1.398
2	Andhra Pradesh	3	1	1	0	1	0	9	1.183
3	Services	3	1	1	0	1	0	8	0.872
4	Rajasthan	3	1	2	0	0	0	6	0.723

Updated to match(es) played on 6 March 2022. Source: ESPN Cricinfo

Advances to Quarter-final

=== Group F ===
Pos	Team	Pld	W	L	T	D	NR	Pts	Quot
1	Punjab	3	2	0	0	1	0	16	1.466
2	Haryana	3	1	1	0	1	0	9	1.102
3	Himachal Pradesh	3	1	1	0	1	0	8	1.006
4	Tripura	3	0	2	0	1	0	1	0.581

Updated to match(es) played on 6 March 2022. Source: ESPN Cricinfo

Advances to Quarter-final

=== Group G ===
Pos	Team	Pld	W	L	T	D	NR	Pts	Quot
1	Uttar Pradesh	3	2	0	0	1	0	13	0.953
2	Vidarbha	3	1	0	0	2	0	12	2.116
3	Maharashtra	3	1	1	0	1	0	8	0.898
4	Assam	3	0	3	0	0	0	0	0.645

Updated to match(es) played on 6 March 2022. Source: ESPN Cricinfo

Advances to Quarter-final

=== Group H ===
Pos	Team	Pld	W	L	T	D	NR	Pts	Quot
1	Jharkhand	3	2	1	0	0	0	12	0.958
2	Chhattisgarh	3	1	0	0	2	0	10	0.906
3	Tamil Nadu	3	0	1	0	2	0	6	1.035
4	Delhi	3	0	1	0	2	0	2	1.069

Updated to match(es) played on 6 March 2022. Source: ESPN Cricinfo

Advances to Preliminary quarter-final

=== Plate Group ===
Pos	Team	Pld	W	L	T	D	NR	BP	Pts	Quot
1	Nagaland	3	3	0	0	0	0	1	19	2.304
2	Manipur	3	1	1	0	1	0	1	10	1.062
3	Sikkim	3	1	1	0	1	0	0	9	1.227
4	Arunachal Pradesh	3	1	2	0	0	0	0	6	0.571
5	Bihar	3	0	1	0	2	0	-2	4	1.249
6	Mizoram	3	0	1	0	2	0	-4	2	0.466

Updated to match(es) played on 6 March 2022. Source: ESPN Cricinfo

Advances to Preliminary quarter-final

== Knockout stage ==
Preliminary QF
H1	Jharkhand	880 & 417/6
P1	Nagaland	289

Quarter-finals
H1	Jharkhand	298
B1	Bengal	773/7d & 318/7d
F1	Punjab	219 & 203
A1	Madhya Pradesh	397 & 26/0
D1	Mumbai	647/8d & 261/3d
E1	Uttarakhand	114 & 69
C1	Karnataka	253 & 114
G1	Uttar Pradesh	155 & 213/5

Semi-finals
B1	Bengal	273 & 175
A1	Madhya Pradesh	341 & 281
D1	Mumbai	393 & 533/4d
G1	Uttar Pradesh	180

Final
A1	Madhya Pradesh	536 & 108/4
D1	Mumbai	374 & 269

=== Preliminary quarter-final ===
12–16 March 2022
Scorecard

Jharkhand	v	Nagaland
880 (203.4 overs); Kumar Kushagra 266 (269); Imliwati Lemtur 4/179 (51.4 overs)		289 (103.3 overs); Chetan Bist 122* (253); Shahbaz Nadeem 3/70 (36.3 overs)
417/6 (90.3 overs); Anukul Roy 153 (164); Rongsen Jonathan 3/109 (23.3 overs)

Match drawn
Eden Gardens, Kolkata
Umpires: Ganesh Charhate and Manish Jain
Player of the match: Kumar Kushagra (Jharkhand)

- Nagaland won the toss and elected to field.
- Kumar Kushagra (Jharkhand) scored his maiden century and his maiden double century in first-class cricket. He broke Javed Miandad's (Pak) record to become the youngest batsman to score 250+ runs in a first-class innings (17 years, 141 days).
- Jharkhand made their highest team total in a first-class cricket match.

=== Quarter-finals ===
6–10 June 2022
1st Quarter-final
Scorecard

Bengal	v	Jharkhand
773/7d (218.4 overs); Sudip Kumar Gharami 186 (380); Sushant Mishra 3/140 (30 overs)		298 (96 overs); Virat Singh 113* (239); Shahbaz Ahmed 4/51 (21 overs)
318/7d (85.1 overs); Manoj Tiwary 136 (185); Shahbaz Nadeem 5/59 (24 overs)

Match drawn
Just Cricket Academy Ground, Bangalore
Umpires: Belur Ravi and Saidharshan Kumar
Player of the match: Sudip Kumar Gharami (Bengal)

- Jharkhand won the toss and elected to field.
- Sudip Kumar Gharami (Bengal) scored his maiden century in first-class cricket.

6–9 June 2022
2nd Quarter-final
Scorecard

Mumbai	v	Uttarakhand
647/8d (166.4 overs); Suved Parkar 252 (447); Deepak Dhapola 3/89 (30 overs)		114 (41.1 overs); Kamal Singh 40 (77); Shams Mulani 5/39 (12 overs)
261/3d (58 overs); Yashasvi Jaiswal 103 (150); Dikshanshu Negi 1/31 (5 overs)		69 (27.5 overs); Shivam Khurana 25* (35); Dhawal Kulkarni 3/11 (6 overs)

Mumbai won by 725 runs
KSCA Stadium, Bangalore
Umpires: C. K. Nandan and Navdeep Singh
Player of the match: Suved Parkar (Mumbai)

- Mumbai won the toss and elected to bat.
- Suved Parkar (Mumbai) made his first-class debut.
- Suved Parkar (Mumbai) scored his maiden century and his maiden double century in first-class cricket.
- The margin of victory was the largest in first-class cricket in terms of runs.

6–8 June 2022
3rd Quarter-final
Scorecard

Karnataka	v	Uttar Pradesh
253 (84 overs); Ravikumar Samarth 57 (81); Saurabh Kumar 4/73 (32 overs)		155 (37.3 overs); Priyam Garg 39 (59); Ronit More 3/47 (12 overs)
114 (39 overs); Srinivas Sharath 23* (57); Saurabh Kumar 3/36 (16 overs)		213/5 (65.2 overs); Karan Sharma 93* (163); Vijaykumar Vyshak 3/47 (17 overs)

Uttar Pradesh won by 5 wickets
KSCA Stadium, Bangalore
Umpires: Nitin Pandit and Yeshwant Barde
Player of the match: Karan Sharma (Uttar Pradesh)

- Uttar Pradesh won the toss and elected to field.
- Prince Yadav (Uttar Pradesh) made his first-class debut.

6–9 June 2022
4th Quarter-final
Scorecard

Punjab	v	Madhya Pradesh
219 (71.3 overs); Abhishek Sharma 47 (72); Anubhav Agarwal 3/36 (13.3 overs)		397 (154.5 overs); Shubham Sharma 102 (213); Vinay Choudhary 5/83 (40.5 overs)
203 (68.4 overs); Anmol Malhotra 34 (87); Kumar Kartikeya 6/50 (34 overs)		26/0 (5.1 overs); Yash Dubey 17* (16)

Madhya Pradesh won by 10 wickets
KSCA Stadium, Bangalore
Umpires: Rohan Pandit and Sundaram Ravi
Player of the match: Shubham Sharma (Madhya Pradesh)

- Punjab won the toss and elected to bat.

=== Semi-finals ===
14–18 June 2022
1st Semi-final
Scorecard

Madhya Pradesh	v	Bengal
341 (105.3 overs); Himanshu Mantri 165 (327); Mukesh Kumar 4/66 (27.3 overs)		273 (89.2 overs); Shahbaz Ahmed 116 (209); Puneet Datey 3/48 (14 overs)
281 (114.2 overs); Aditya Shrivastava 82 (225); Shahbaz Ahmed 5/79 (41 overs)		175 (65.2 overs); Abhimanyu Easwaran 78 (157); Kumar Kartikeya 5/67 (32 overs)

Madhya Pradesh won by 174 runs
KSCA Stadium, Bangalore
Umpires: Krishnamachari Srinivasan and Ulhas Gandhe
Player of the match: Himanshu Mantri (Madhya Pradesh)

- Madhya Pradesh won the toss and elected to bat.

14–18 June 2022
2nd Semi-final
Scorecard

Mumbai	v	Uttar Pradesh
393 (140.4 overs); Hardik Tamore 115 (233); Karan Sharma 4/46 (17 overs)		180 (54.3 overs); Shivam Mavi 48 (55); Tushar Deshpande 2/34 (17 overs)
533/4d (156 overs); Yashasvi Jaiswal 181 (372); Prince Yadav 2/92 (27 overs)

Match drawn
Just Cricket Academy Ground, Bangalore
Umpires: Chirra Ravikanthreddy and Vineet Kulkarni
Player of the match: Yashasvi Jaiswal (Mumbai)

- Uttar Pradesh won the toss and elected to field.

=== Final ===
22–26 June 2022
Final
Scorecard

Mumbai	v	Madhya Pradesh
374 (127.4 overs); Sarfaraz Khan 134 (234); Gaurav Yadav 4/106 (35.4 overs)		536 (177.2 overs); Yash Dubey 133 (336); Shams Mulani 5/173 (63.2 overs)
269 (57.3 overs); Sarfaraz Khan 45 (48); Kumar Kartikeya 4/98 (25 overs)		108/4 (29.5 overs); Himanshu Mantri 37 (55); Shams Mulani 3/41 (13 overs)

Madhya Pradesh won by 6 wickets
M. Chinnaswamy Stadium, Bangalore
Umpires: K. N. Ananthapadmanabhan and Virender Sharma
Player of the match: Shubham Sharma (Madhya Pradesh)

- Mumbai won the toss and elected to bat.
- Parth Sahani (Madhya Pradesh) made his first-class debut.

== Statistics ==
=== Most runs ===
Runs	Player	Match	Innings	Average	Highest score	100	50	Team
982	Sarfaraz Khan	6	9	122.75	275	4	2	Mumbai
658	Rajat Patidar	6	9	53.15	142	2	5	Madhya Pradesh
623	Chetan Bist	4	6	311.50	155*	5	0	Nagaland
614	Yash Dubey	6	10	76.75	289	2	1	Madhya Pradesh
608	Shubham Sharma	6	9	76.00	116	4	1	Madhya Pradesh

=== Most wickets ===
Wickets	Player	Match	Innings	Average	Best	5-fer	10-fer	Team
45	Shams Mulani	6	11	16.75	7/114	6	2	Mumbai
32	Kumar Kartikeya	6	11	21.00	6/50	3	0	Madhya Pradesh
25	Shahbaz Nadeem	5	9	24.96	5/58	3	1	Jharkhand
23	Gaurav Yadav	5	10	18.91	5/11	1	0	Madhya Pradesh
21	Satyajeet Bachhav	3	5	19.61	7/45	2	1	Maharashtra

== Broadcasters ==
Star Sports and Disney+ Hotstar aired selective matches on TV and internet respectively. BCCI's website broadcast highlights and scores.
