= Himanshu Mantri =

Indian cricketer (born 1994)

Personal information
- Full name: Himanshu Sandeep Kumar Mantri
- Born: 9 February 1994 (age 32); Shahdol, Madhya Pradesh, India
- Batting: Left-handed
- Role: Wicket-keeper

Domestic team information
- Years: Team
- 2019/20–present: Madhya Pradesh

Career statistics
Competition	First-class	List A
Matches	35	5
Runs scored	2,189	260
Batting average	39.08	65.00
100s/50s	6/8	1/2
Top score	165	127*
Catches/stumpings	99/12	9/–
- Source: ESPNcricinfo, 27 March 2025

Himanshu Mantri (born 9 February 1994) is an Indian cricketer. He made his first-class debut on 17 December 2019, for Madhya Pradesh in the 2019–20 Ranji Trophy.
