= Shubham Sharma (Madhya Pradesh cricketer) =

Indian cricketer (born 1993)

Personal information
- Full name: Shubham Shyamsunder Sharma
- Born: 24 December 1993 (age 32); Indore, Madhya Pradesh, India
- Batting: Right-handed
- Bowling: Right arm off break
- Role: Batsman

Domestic team information
- Years: Team
- 2013-present: Madhya Pradesh

Career statistics
Competition	FC	LA	T20
Matches	66	44	17
Runs scored	4,145	1,477	290
Batting average	42.73	36.02	24.08
100s/50s	11/23	2/11	0/1
Top score	240	108	56
Balls bowled	2,008	816	30
Wickets	26	23	1
Bowling average	42.53	30.17	24.00
5 wickets in innings	1	0	0
10 wickets in match	0	0	0
Best bowling	5/59	4/21	1/18
Catches/stumpings	25/–	15/–	7/–
- Source: Cricinfo, 1 April 2025

Shubham Shyamsunder Sharma (born 24 December 1993) is an Indian first-class cricketer who plays for Madhya Pradesh. He is right handed middle order batsman who can even contribute with his Right arm off break bowling.

He made his First-class cricket debut against Baroda in November 2013. He has scored 11 tons in first class career. Apart from his batting, he is a disciplined fielder and a fruitful bowler, who always tries to capitalize his innings. His best all-round performance was against Bengal in November 2018 where he bagged a five-wicket haul and a century as well.

He made his Twenty20 debut on 4 November 2021, for Madhya Pradesh in the 2021–22 Syed Mushtaq Ali Trophy.
