= Shams Mulani =

Indian cricketer (born 1997)

Personal information
- Full name: Shams Zakir Mulani
- Born: 13 March 1997 (age 29); Raigad, Maharashtra, India
- Batting: Left-handed
- Bowling: Slow Left arm orthodox

Domestic team information
- Years: Team
- 2018–present: Mumbai
- 2024: Mumbai Indians

Career statistics
Competition	FC	LA	T20
Matches	50	55	51
Runs scored	2,165	632	255
Batting average	32.31	27.47	15.00
100s/50s	1/19	0/2	0/1
Top score	100*	75	73
Balls bowled	10,851	3,000	1,092
Wickets	234	82	57
Bowling average	23.85	28.00	22.22
5 wickets in innings	16	0	0
10 wickets in match	7	0	0
Best bowling	7/94	4/62	3/18
Catches/stumpings	31/–	18/–	18/–
- Source: Cricinfo, 28 November 2024

Shams Mulani (born 13 March 1997) is an Indian cricketer who plays for Mumbai in domestic cricket and previously appeared for the Mumbai Indians in the Indian Premier League. He made his Twenty20 debut for Mumbai in the 2017–18 Zonal T20 League on 11 January 2018. He made his List A debut for Mumbai in the 2017–18 Vijay Hazare Trophy on 5 February 2018.

In October 2018, he was named in India A's squad for the 2018–19 Deodhar Trophy. In December 2018, he was named in India's team for the 2018 ACC Emerging Teams Asia Cup. In December 2019, in the opening round of the 2019–20 Ranji Trophy, he took his first five-wicket haul in first-class cricket.
