= Yash Dubey =

Indian cricketer (born 1998)

Personal information
- Born: 23 December 1998 (age 27); Jabalpur, Madhya Pradesh, India
- Batting: Right-handed
- Bowling: Legbreak googly

Domestic team information
- Years: Team
- 2018–present: Madhya Pradesh
- Source: Cricinfo, 28 September 2018

Yash Dubey (born 23 December 1998) is an Indian cricketer. He made his List A debut for Madhya Pradesh in the 2018–19 Vijay Hazare Trophy on 28 September 2018. He made his first-class debut for Madhya Pradesh in the 2018–19 Ranji Trophy on 1 November 2018.
