= Runs per wicket ratio =

Ranking method used in cricket

Runs per wicket ratio (RpW ratio, also called the Quotient) is a method of ranking teams in league tables in cricket who are equal on other criteria, including points.

== Usage ==
It was used in the 2019–2021 ICC World Test Championship, under the name RpW Ratio.

It is used in Australia's Sheffield Shield, under the name Quotient. It was used to determine the champions in 1910–11, and a number of times after that. It has not been required to determine final league positions since fractional bonus points for each run scored and wicket taken were introduced (in 2014–15).

It is used in India's Ranji Trophy and Duleep Trophy, under the name Quotient.

== Calculation ==
It is the number of runs scored per wicket lost, divided by the number of runs conceded per wicket taken:

$\text{RpW ratio }=\frac{\text{total runs scored}}{\text{total wickets lost}} \div \frac{\text{total runs conceded}}{\text{total wickets taken}}.$

Mathematically, this is equivalent to: $\text{RpW ratio} = \frac{ {\text{total runs scored}} \times {\text{total wickets taken}} } { {\text{total runs conceded}} \times {\text{total wickets lost}} }.$

For example, if in one match Sri Lanka scored a total of 535 runs for the loss of 14 wickets, then they scored 38.214 runs per wicket. If they conceded 534 runs while taking 20 wickets, then they conceded 26.7 runs per wicket. So their RpW ratio = 38.214 ÷ 26.7 = 1.431.

The RpW ratio for their opponent (say, New Zealand) is the inverse of this: 26.7 ÷ 38.214 = 0.699. So if two teams have played only each other, their two RpW ratio figures are reciprocals.

As the units are the same either side of the division (runs/wickets), they cancel out, so RpW ratio is a dimensionless quantity.

== Interpretation ==
It is the average number of runs scored per wicket, for each run per wicket conceded:

- If RpW ratio is less than 1, then the team scored fewer runs per wicket than it conceded. In the example, New Zealand scored 26.7 runs per wicket but conceded 38.214 runs per wicket. So they scored 0.699 runs per wicket for each run per wicket conceded.
- If RpW ratio equals 1, then the team scored exactly the same number of runs per wicket as it conceded.
- If RpW ratio is greater than 1, then the team scored more runs per wicket than it conceded. In the example, Sri Lanka scored 38.214 runs per wicket and conceded 26.7 runs per wicket. So they scored 1.431 runs per wicket for each run per wicket conceded.

RpW ratio is not to be confused with the ratio of runs conceded to wickets taken by individual bowlers, known as bowling average, or with batting average.

Note: With just RpW ratio, the winner of a particular match cannot be decided as the data is insufficient in telling the actual status of the match already played.
