= 2022–23 Ranji Trophy Group C =

Cricket tournament

- Dates: 13 December 2022 – 10 February 2023
- Administrator: BCCI
- Cricket format: First-class cricket
- Tournament format: Round-robin then knockout
- Participants: 8

The 2022–23 Ranji Trophy is the 88th season of the Ranji Trophy, the premier first-class cricket tournament in India. It is contested by 38 teams, divided into four elite groups and a plate group, with eight teams in Group C. The tournament was announced by the Board of Control for Cricket in India (BCCI) on 8 August 2022.

== Points table ==
Pos	Team	Pld	W	L	T	D	NR	Pts	Quot
1	Karnataka	7	4	0	0	3	0	35	1.763
2	Jharkhand	7	3	2	0	2	0	23	1.102
3	Kerala	7	3	1	0	3	0	21	0.992
4	Rajasthan	7	2	2	0	3	0	20	1.118
5	Chhattisgarh	7	3	4	0	0	0	19	0.958
6	Goa	7	2	2	0	3	0	18	0.906
7	Services	7	2	4	0	1	0	13	0.753
8	Pondicherry	7	1	5	0	1	0	9	0.763

Updated to match(es) played on 27 January 2023. Source: ESPN Cricinfo

Advances to Quarter-final

== Fixtures ==
=== Round 1 ===
13–16 December 2022
Scorecard

Kerala	v	Jharkhand
475 (146.4 overs); Akshay Chandran 150 (268); Shahbaz Nadeem 5/167 (45 overs)		340 (105.3 overs); Ishan Kishan 132 (195); Jalaj Saxena 5/75 (37.3 overs)
187/7d (36 overs); Rohan Prem 74 (86); Shahbaz Nadeem 5/79 (16 overs)		237 (61.2 overs); Kumar Kushagra 92 (116); Vaisakh Chandran 5/57 (17 overs)

Kerala won by 85 runs
JSCA International Stadium Complex, Ranchi
Umpires: Yeshwant Barde and Bharati Vij
Player of the match: Jalaj Saxena (Kerala)

- Kerala won the toss and elected to bat.
- Fazil Fanoos, Shoun Roger, Vaisakh Chandran (Kerala) and Manishi (Jharkhand) all made their first-class debuts.

13–16 December 2022
Scorecard

Karnataka	v	Services
304 (74.4 overs); BR Sharath 77 (115); Diwesh Pathania 5/86 (20 overs)		261 (83.2 overs); Rajat Paliwal 124 (217); Vidhwath Kaverappa 4/64 (21 overs)
253/4d (56 overs); Ravikumar Samarth 119 (178); Arpit Guleria 2/59 (15 overs)		150/3 (39 overs); Anshul Gupta 71* (92); Vidhwath Kaverappa 1/15 (7 overs)

Match drawn
M. Chinnaswamy Stadium, Bengaluru
Umpires: Rajeev Godara and Chettithody Shamshuddin
Player of the match: Diwesh Pathania (Services)

- Services won the toss and elected to field.
- Nikin Jose and Vishal Onat (Karnataka) both made their first-class debuts.

13–15 December 2022
Scorecard

Chhattisgarh	v	Pondicherry
162 (59 overs); Shahnawaz Hussain 43* (56); Sagar Udeshi 4/36 (22 overs)		37 (23.2 overs); Ankit Sharma 15 (21); Ajay Mandal 7/7 (11.2 overs)
184 (42.1 overs); Harpreet Singh Bhatia 63 (86); Sagar Udeshi 7/50 (20 overs)		177 (65.3 overs); Arun Karthik 55* (82); Ajay Mandal 6/56 (22.3 overs)

Chhattisgarh won by 132 runs
Cricket Association Ground, Puducherry
Umpires: Pranav Joshi and Jayaraman Madanagopal
Player of the match: Ajay Mandal (Chhattisgarh)

- Chhattisgarh won the toss and elected to bat.
- Aayush Pandey (Chhattisgarh), Sridhar Ashwath and Mohit Mittan (Pondicherry) all made their first-class debuts.

13–16 December 2022
Scorecard

Goa	v	Rajasthan
547/9d (174 overs); Suyash Prabhudessai 212 (416); Arafat Khan 3/105 (36 overs)		456 (133.1 overs); Yash Kothari 96 (93); Mohit Redkar 5/113 (47 overs)

Match drawn
Goa Cricket Association Academy Ground, Porvorim
Umpires: Krishnaraj Srinath and Rajesh Timaney
Player of the match: Suyash Prabhudessai (Goa)

- Rajasthan won the toss and elected to field.
- Arjun Tendulkar, Mohit Redkar, Ruthvik Naik (Goa), Abhijeet Tomar and Kunal Singh Rathore (Rajasthan) all made their first-class debuts.

=== Round 2 ===
20–23 December 2022
Scorecard

Jharkhand	v	Goa
386 (128.1 overs); Kumar Kushagra 96 (141); Darshan Misal 4/68 (33.1 overs)		362 (134.3 overs); Eknath Kerkar 73 (145); Shahbaz Nadeem 4/86 (41 overs)
212/3d (55 overs); Virat Singh 100* (97); Mohit Redkar 2/64 (15 overs)		61/3 (23 overs); Snehal Kauthankar 34* (43); Utkarsh Singh 2/25 (9 overs)

Match drawn
Keenan Stadium, Jamshedpur
Umpires: Vineet Kulkarni and Rajesh Timaney
Player of the match: Kumar Kushagra (Jharkhand)

- Jharkhand won the toss and elected to bat.
- Shubham Desai (Goa) made his first-class debut.

20–23 December 2022
Scorecard

Services	v	Chhattisgarh
213 (60.1 overs); Anshul Gupta 71 (105); Ravi Kiran 5/44 (15 overs)		389 (130 overs); Amandeep Khare 125* (283); Diwesh Pathania 3/71 (25 overs)
221 (61.2 overs); Rahul Singh 71 (116); Ajay Mandal 5/38 (14 overs)		46/0 (12.1 overs); Rishabh Tiwari 25* (38)

Chhattisgarh won by 10 wickets
Palam A Stadium, Delhi
Umpires: Dharmesh Bhardwaj and Joy Mahanta
Player of the match: Ajay Mandal (Chhattisgarh)

- Services won the toss and elected to bat.

20–22 December 2022
Scorecard

Pondicherry	v	Karnataka
170 (54 overs); Damodaran Rohit 44 (51); Vidhwath Kaverappa 4/52 (16 overs)		304 (93.2 overs); Ravikumar Samarth 137 (242); Ankit Sharma 6/60 (22 overs)
127 (43 overs); Jay Pande 26 (70); Ronit More 4/36 (14 overs)

Karnataka won by an innings and 7 runs
M. Chinnaswamy Stadium, Bengaluru
Umpires: Parashar Joshi and Chirra Ravikanthreddy
Player of the match: Ravikumar Samarth (Karnataka)

- Karnataka won the toss and elected to field.
- Abin Mathew (Pondicherry) made his first-class debut.

20–23 December 2022
Scorecard

Rajasthan	v	Kerala
337 (97.1 overs); Deepak Hooda 133 (187); Jalaj Saxena 3/78 (28 overs)		306 (82.5 overs); Sachin Baby 139* (217); Aniket Choudhary 5/85 (20.5 overs)
363/8d (88 overs); Deepak Hooda 155* (155); Jalaj Saxena 3/93 (24 overs)		299/8 (68 overs); Sachin Baby 81* (139); Manav Suthar 3/103 (24 overs)

Match drawn
Sawai Mansingh Stadium, Jaipur
Umpires: Rohan Pandit and Chettithody Shamshuddin
Player of the match: Deepak Hooda (Rajasthan)

- Kerala won the toss and elected to field.

=== Round 3 ===
27–30 December 2022
Scorecard

Services	v	Jharkhand
367 (108.1 overs); Rajat Paliwal 76 (138); Anukul Roy 6/67 (26.1 overs)		551/8d (142 overs); Saurabh Tiwary 165 (237); Arpit Guleria 3/138 (25 overs)
214 (74.2 overs); Arpit Guleria 77 (118); Shahbaz Nadeem 5/78 (32 overs)		31/1 (7.5 overs); Kumar Deobrat 17* (21); Pulkit Narang 1/2 (2 overs)

Jharkhand won by 9 wickets
Keenan Stadium, Jamshedpur
Umpires: Pranav Joshi and Rajesh Kannan
Player of the match: Anukul Roy (Jharkhand)

- Services won the toss and elected to bat.
- Mohit Rathee (Services) made his first-class debut.

27–30 December 2022
Scorecard

Karnataka	v	Goa
603/7d (148.2 overs); Manish Pandey 208* (186); Darshan Misal 3/145 (47 overs)		373 (121.5 overs); Darshan Misal 95 (172); Vijaykumar Vyshak 3/60 (17.5 overs)
		150/3 (45 overs) (f/o); Suyash Prabhudessai 61* (95); Vijaykumar Vyshak 1/12 (7 overs)

Match drawn
Goa Cricket Association Academy Ground, Porvorim
Umpires: Arun Kumar Basa and Sadashiv Iyer
Player of the match: Manish Pandey (Karnataka)

- Karnataka won the toss and elected to bat.

27–28 December 2022
Scorecard

Rajasthan	v	Pondicherry
335 (82.2 overs); Manav Suthar 96* (89); Sagar Udeshi 4/79 (31.2 overs)		104 (38 overs); Paras Dogra 33 (68); Manav Suthar 8/33 (17 overs)
		130 (40.1 overs) (f/o); Arun Karthik 38 (49); Mahipal Lomror 4/38 (8.3 overs)

Rajasthan won by an innings and 101 runs
Cricket Association Ground, Puducherry
Umpires: Abhijit Deshmukh and Vinod Ingle
Player of the match: Manav Suthar (Rajasthan)

- Rajasthan won the toss and elected to bat.
- Satish Jangir, Santosh Ratnaparkhe, Parameeswaran Sivaraman (Pondicherry) and Ravi Bishnoi (Rajasthan) all made their first-class debuts.

27–30 December 2022
Scorecard

Chhattisgarh	v	Kerala
149 (49.5 overs); Harpreet Singh Bhatia 40 (56); Jalaj Saxena 5/48 (18.5 overs)		311 (107.1 overs); Rohan Prem 77 (157); Sumit Ruikar 3/37 (19.1 overs)
287 (89.4 overs); Harpreet Singh Bhatia 152 (228); Jalaj Saxena 6/75 (37.4 overs)		126/3 (19.1 overs); Ponnan Rahul 66* (58); Sumit Ruikar 2/44 (8 overs)

Kerala won by 7 wickets
St Xavier's College Ground, Thumba
Umpires: Manish Jain and Puttarangaiah Jayapal
Player of the match: Jalaj Saxena (Kerala)

- Kerala won the toss and elected to field.
- Mayank Yadav (Chhattisgarh) made his first-class debut.

=== Round 4 ===
3–6 January 2023
Scorecard

Chhattisgarh	v	Karnataka
311 (109.3 overs); Ashutosh Singh 135 (319); Vidhwath Kaverappa 5/67 (28 overs)		366 (121.4 overs); Mayank Agarwal 117 (228); Ajay Mandal 4/93 (37 overs)
177 (77.5 overs); Amandeep Khare 50 (111); Vijaykumar Vyshak 5/59 (18.5 overs)		128/3 (23.2 overs); Nikin Jose 44* (59); Sumit Ruikar 2/35 (11 overs)

Karnataka won by 7 wickets
M. Chinnaswamy Stadium, Bengaluru
Umpires: Premdip Chatterjee and Rajesh Timaney
Player of the match: Vijaykumar Vyshak (Karnataka)

- Karnataka won the toss and elected to field.
- Mayank Verma (Chhattisgarh) made his first-class debut.

3–6 January 2023
Scorecard

Pondicherry	v	Services
216 (62.4 overs); Arun Karthik 58 (100); Diwesh Pathania 3/39 (23 overs)		466/7d (129 overs); Rahul Singh 137 (191); Ankit Sharma 3/80 (30 overs)
313 (96.3 overs); Arun Karthik 130 (202); Diwesh Pathania 3/83 (25 overs)		67/5 (13.2 overs); Rahul Singh 33* (33); Sagar Udeshi 3/20 (6 overs)

Services won by 5 wickets
Palam A Stadium, Delhi
Umpires: Sandeep Chavan and Rajeev Godara
Player of the match: Rahul Singh (Services)

- Services won the toss and elected to field.
- Krishna Pandey (Pondicherry) and Lovekesh Bansal (Services) both made their first-class debuts.

3–6 January 2023
Scorecard

Kerala	v	Goa
265 (95.3 overs); Rohan Prem 112 (239); Lakshay Garg 4/44 (19 overs)		311 (110.2 overs); Ishaan Gadekar 105 (200); Jalaj Saxena 5/103 (40.2 overs)
200 (62.3 overs); Rohan Prem 70 (138); Mohit Redkar 6/73 (22 overs)		157/3 (48.3 overs); Ishaan Gadekar 67* (136); Vaisakh Chandran 1/31 (12 overs)

Goa won by 7 wickets
St Xavier's College Ground, Thumba
Umpires: Sundaram Ravi and Tapan Sharma
Player of the match: Ishaan Gadekar (Goa)

- Kerala won the toss and elected to bat.
- Ishaan Gadekar (Goa) made his first-class debut.

3–6 January 2023
Scorecard

Jharkhand	v	Rajasthan
92 (47 overs); Aryaman Sen 38 (124); Aniket Choudhary 4/16 (14 overs)		287 (81.2 overs); Karan Lamba 122* (184); Ashish Kumar 5/75 (25 overs)
470/9d (153 overs); Anukul Roy 125 (207); Tanveer Ul-Haq 3/82 (32 overs)		194/4 (33 overs); Yash Kothari 95 (85); Shahbaz Nadeem 3/48 (10 overs)

Match drawn
Sawai Mansingh Stadium, Jaipur
Umpires: Umesh Dubey and Mohit Krishnadas
Player of the match: Karan Lamba (Rajasthan)

- Rajasthan won the toss and elected to field.
- Supriyo Chakraborty, Aryaman Sen (Jharkhand) and Karan Lamba (Rajasthan) all made their first-class debuts.

=== Round 5 ===
10–13 January 2023
Scorecard

Jharkhand	v	Chhattisgarh
103 (32.1 overs); Kumar Suraj 19 (19); Ravi Kiran 5/42 (13.1 overs)		113 (50.3 overs); Avnish Dhaliwal 50 (86); Ashish Kumar 5/44 (17.3 overs)
366 (100.3 overs); Aryaman Sen 85 (183); Ravi Kiran 4/60 (25 overs)		312 (114.3 overs); Amandeep Khare 151 (283); Anukul Roy 5/45 (26 overs)

Jharkhand won by 44 runs
Keenan Stadium, Jamshedpur
Umpires: Saiyed Khalid and Gayathri Venugopalan
Player of the match: Amandeep Khare (Chhattisgarh)

- Chhattisgarh won the toss and elected to field.
- Vashudev Bareth (Chhattisgarh) made his first-class debut.

10–12 January 2023
Scorecard

Rajasthan	v	Karnataka
129 (45.3 overs); Kunal Singh Rathore 33 (54); Vasuki Koushik 4/37 (17.3 overs)		445 (132.1 overs); Manish Pandey 101 (131); Aniket Choudhary 4/110 (36 overs)
330 (65.4 overs); Mahipal Lomror 99 (83); Vijaykumar Vyshak 4/73 (11.4 overs)		15/0 (5 overs); Mayank Agarwal 10* (19)

Karnataka won by 10 wickets
Alur Cricket Ground, Bengaluru
Umpires: Amit Bansal and Premdip Chatterjee
Player of the match: Manish Pandey (Karnataka)

- Rajasthan won the toss and elected to bat.

10–13 January 2023
Scorecard

Kerala	v	Services
327 (121 overs); Sachin Baby 159 (308); Poonam Poonia 2/40 (22 overs)		229 (68.1 overs); Ravi Chauhan 50 (114); Sijomon Joseph 3/15 (6.1 overs)
242/7d (60 overs); Sachin Baby 93 (109); Diwesh Pathania 2/13 (6 overs)		136 (46.4 overs); Sufiyan Alam 52 (108); Jalaj Saxena 8/36 (15.4 overs)

Kerala won by 204 runs
St Xavier's College Ground, Thumba
Umpires: Krishnaraj Srinath and Kannur Swaroopanand
Player of the match: Sachin Baby (Kerala)

- Kerala won the toss and elected to bat.

10–12 January 2023
Scorecard

Goa	v	Pondicherry
223 (84 overs); Darshan Misal 50* (85); Sagar Udeshi 5/76 (32 overs)		347 (107 overs); Arun Karthik 122 (197); Darshan Misal 5/111 (43 overs)
167 (58.3 overs); Snehal Kauthankar 49 (113); Ankit Sharma 6/61 (23.3 overs)		46/1 (19.1 overs); Paras Dogra 18 (61); Darshan Misal 1/10 (9 overs)

Pondicherry won by 9 wickets
Goa Cricket Association Academy Ground, Porvorim
Umpires: Vineet Kulkarni and Vrinda Rathi
Player of the match: Ankit Sharma (Pondicherry)

- Pondicherry won the toss and elected to field.
- Manthan Khutkar (Goa) made his first-class debut.

=== Round 6 ===
17–20 January 2023
Scorecard

Services	v	Goa
175 (59.2 overs); Pulkit Narang 52 (91); Vijesh Prabhudessai 3/39 (16.2 overs)		483/9d (155.2 overs); Eknath Kerkar 156* (309); Pulkit Narang 4/141 (52 overs)
304 (91 overs); Ravi Chauhan 139 (238); Darshan Misal 5/70 (27 overs)

Goa won by an innings and 4 runs
Palam A Stadium, Delhi
Umpires: Sanjeev Dua and MM Srinivasa Rangan
Player of the match: Eknath Kerkar (Goa)

- Services won the toss and elected to bat.

17–20 January 2023
Scorecard

Pondicherry	v	Jharkhand
231 (91.4 overs); Arun Karthik 68 (149); Ashish Kumar 3/34 (19 overs)		412 (133.2 overs); Virat Singh 124 (214); Sagar Udeshi 8/118 (48.2 overs)
250 (84.5 overs); Arun Karthik 82* (135); Ashish Kumar 3/32 (13.5 overs)		73/0 (26.2 overs); Kumar Deobrat 38* (82)

Jharkhand won by 10 wickets
Sree Lakshmi Narayana Institute of Medical Sciences Ground, Puducherry
Umpires: Puttarangaiah Jayapal and Anmol Sharda
Player of the match: Virat Singh (Jharkhand)

- Pondicherry won the toss and elected to bat.
- Monu Kumar (Jharkhand) and Premraj Rajavelu (Pondicherry) both made their first-class debuts.

17–20 January 2023
Scorecard

Kerala	v	Karnataka
342 (130.1 overs); Sachin Baby 141 (307); Vasuki Koushik 6/54 (22.1 overs)		485/9d (163.1 overs); Mayank Agarwal 208 (360); Vaisakh Chandran 3/117 (43 overs)
96/4 (51 overs); Sachin Baby 37* (109); Krishnappa Gowtham 3/35 (22 overs)

Match drawn
St Xavier's College Ground, Thumba
Umpires: Abhijit Deshmukh and Parashar Joshi
Player of the match: Mayank Agarwal (Karnataka)

- Kerala won the toss and elected to bat.

17–20 January 2023
Scorecard

Rajasthan	v	Chhattisgarh
360 (93 overs); Samarpit Joshi 123 (181); Ravi Kiran 4/108 (24 overs)		199 (77.3 overs); Ajay Mandal 48 (74); Aniket Choudhary 4/25 (20 overs)
268/3d (48 overs); Mahipal Lomror 130* (120); Vashudev Bareth 2/27 (5 overs)		262 (83.4 overs); Shashank Singh 51 (80); Manav Suthar 6/116 (37.4 overs)

Rajasthan won by 167 runs
Barkatullah Khan Stadium, Jodhpur
Umpires: Sadashiv Iyer and Kusha Prakash
Player of the match: Manav Suthar (Rajasthan)

- Chhattisgarh won the toss and elected to field.
- Mukul Choudhary and Sahil Dhiwan (Rajasthan) both made their first-class debuts.

=== Round 7 ===
24–26 January 2023
Scorecard

Jharkhand	v	Karnataka
164 (64.2 overs); Kumar Kushagra 37 (106); Krishnappa Gowtham 4/61 (24 overs)		300 (89.1 overs); Devdutt Padikkal 114 (175); Shahbaz Nadeem 5/141 (36 overs)
201 (78.5 overs); Supriyo Chakraborty 48 (93); Krishnappa Gowtham 5/75 (28 overs)		66/1 (18.1 overs); Nikin Jose 42* (45); Shahbaz Nadeem 1/24 (9 overs)

Karnataka won by 9 wickets
Keenan Stadium, Jamshedpur
Umpires: Shaktipada Bhattacharya and Sanjay Kumar Singh
Player of the match: Devdutt Padikkal (Karnataka)

- Jharkhand won the toss and elected to bat.

24–27 January 2023
Scorecard

Chhattisgarh	v	Goa
531/9d (155 overs); Shashank Chandrakar 101 (191); Lakshay Garg 3/88 (28 overs)		359 (92.5 overs); Snehal Kauthankar 147* (193); Ravi Kiran 3/66 (21 overs)
52/2 (5.5 overs); Shashank Singh 23 (15); Vijesh Prabhudessai 2/25 (3 overs)		223 (86 overs) (f/o); Ishaan Gadekar 59 (139); Ravi Kiran 3/12 (12 overs)

Chhattisgarh won by 8 wickets
Shaheed Veer Narayan Singh International Cricket Stadium, Raipur
Umpires: Subrat Das and Akshay Totre
Player of the match: Snehal Kauthankar (Goa)

- Chhattisgarh won the toss and elected to bat.

24–27 January 2023
Scorecard

Pondicherry	v	Kerala
371 (127.3 overs); Paras Dogra 159 (361); Jalaj Saxena 5/75 (33.3 overs)		286 (113 overs); Akshay Chandran 70 (164); Sagar Udeshi 5/62 (40 overs)
279/5 (74.3 overs); Jay Pande 102* (212); Suresh Vishweshwar 3/58 (15 overs)

Match drawn
Cricket Association Ground, Puducherry
Umpires: Rohan Pandit and Nagaraj Ramesh
Player of the match: Sagar Udeshi (Pondicherry)

- Kerala won the toss and elected to field.
- Akash Kargave, Vishal Khokhar (Pondicherry) and Suresh Vishweshwar (Kerala) all made their first-class debuts.

24–27 January 2023
Scorecard

Services	v	Rajasthan
178 (56.4 overs); Rahul Singh 70 (86); Manav Suthar 4/56 (21 overs)		136 (45.4 overs); Yash Kothari 34 (49); Pulkit Narang 5/39 (15.4 overs)
276 (103.5 overs); Ravi Chauhan 98 (200); Aniket Choudhary 5/58 (24.5 overs)		135 (47.4 overs); Yash Kothari 72 (107); Pulkit Narang 5/22 (14.4 overs)

Services won by 183 runs
Barkatullah Khan Stadium, Jodhpur
Umpires: C. K. Nandan and Ravi Shankar
Player of the match: Pulkit Narang (Services)

- Rajasthan won the toss and elected to field.
