= 2024–25 Ranji Trophy Plate Group =

- Dates: 11 October 2024 – 16 November 2025
- Administrator: BCCI
- Cricket format: First-class cricket
- Tournament format: Round-robin then knockout
- Host: India
- Champions: Goa
- Runners-up: Nagaland
- Participants: 6
- Matches: 16
- Player of the series: Snehal Kauthankar (Goa)
- Most runs: Snehal Kauthankar (949) (Goa)
- Most wickets: Jagadeesha Suchith (43) (Nagaland)

The 2024–25 Ranji Trophy is the 90th season of the Ranji Trophy, the premier first-class cricket tournament in India. It is contested by 38 teams, divided into four elite groups and a plate group, with six teams in Plate Group. It took place between 11 October 2024 to 16 November 2025.

== Points table ==
Pos	Team	Pld	W	L	T	D	NR	Pts
1	Goa	5	5	0	0	0	0	33
2	Nagaland	5	3	1	0	1	0	23
3	Mizoram	5	2	2	0	1	0	14
4	Sikkim	5	2	2	0	1	0	13
5	Manipur	5	1	3	0	1	0	9
6	Arunachal Pradesh	5	0	5	0	0	0	0

Source: ESPNcricinfo

Advances to Plate Finals

== Fixtures ==
=== Round 1 ===
11–14 October 2024
Scorecard

Sikkim; 191 (70 overs) & 269 (100.1 overs)	v	Mizoram; 163 (44.5 overs) & 160 (35.3 overs)

Sikkim won by 137 runs
SICA ground, Rangpo
Points: Sikkim 6, Mizoram 0

11–14 October 2024
Scorecard

Nagaland; 509/5d (114.2 overs)	v	Arunachal Pradesh; 75 (40.2 overs) & 144 (66 overs) (f/o)

Nagaland won by an innings and 290 runs
Nagaland Cricket Stadium, Sovima
Points: Nagaland 7, Arunachal Pradesh 0

11–14 October 2024
Scorecard

Goa; 376 (109.2 overs) & 76/1 (11.4 overs)	v	Manipur; 98 (25.1 overs) & 353 (86.4 overs) (f/o)

Goa won by 9 wickets
Goa Cricket Association Academy Ground, Porvorim
Points: Goa 6, Manipur 0

=== Round 2 ===
18–21 October 2024
Scorecard

Goa; 108 (46.5 overs) & 206/9 (66.1 overs)	v	Sikkim; 367/4d (95.4 overs)

Goa won by an innings and 53 runs
SICA ground, Rangpo
Points: Goa 7, Sikkim 0

18–21 October 2024
Scorecard

Nagaland; 237 (89.4 overs) & 306/5d (92 overs)	v	Manipur; 139 (51.1 overs) & 257 (92.1 overs)

Nagaland won by 147 runs
Nagaland Cricket Stadium, Sovima
Points: Nagaland 6, Manipur 0

18–21 October 2024
Scorecard

Mizoram; 247 (60.1 overs) & 404/2d (79 overs)	v	Arunachal Pradesh; 252 (76 overs) & 132 (43.5 overs)

Mizoram won by 267 runs
Gujarat College Ground, Ahmedabad
Points: Mizoram 6, Arunachal Pradesh 0

=== Round 3 ===
26–29 October 2024
Scorecard

Sikkim; 424 (10.2 overs) & 170 (36.2 overs)	v	Arunachal Pradesh; 295 (89.5 overs) & 195 (62.3 overs)

Sikkim won by 104 runs
Narendra Modi Stadium B Ground, Ahmedabad
Points: Sikkim 6, Arunachal Pradesh 0

26–29 October 2024
Scorecard

Goa; 179 (58.1 overs) & 306 (92.1 overs)	v	Nagaland; 147 (55 overs) & 255 (194.1 overs)

Goa won by 83 runs
Panjim Gymkhana Grounds, Panaji
Points: Goa 6, Nagaland 0

26–29 October 2024
Scorecard

Mozoram; 536 (137.1 overs)	v	Manipur; 270 (86.5 overs) & 246 (75.3 overs) (f/o)

Mizoram won by an innings and 20 runs
Gokulbhai Somabhai Patel Stadium, Nadiad
Points: Mizoram 7, Manipur 0

=== Round 4 ===
6–9 November 2024
Scorecard

Sikkim; 192 (106 overs) & 116 (48.3 overs)	v	Nagaland; 347 (123 overs)

Nagaland won by an innings and 39 runs
Nagaland Cricket Stadium, Sovima
Points: Nagaland 7, Sikkim 0

6–9 November 2024
Scorecard

Manipur; 266 (88 overs) & 359/7d (85.3 overs)	v	Arunachal Pradesh; 115 (38.5 overs) & 190 (43.1 overs)

Manipur won by 320 runs
ADSA Railways Cricket Ground, Ahmedabad
Points: Manipur 6, Arunachal Pradesh 0

6–9 November 2024
Scorecard

Goa; 555/9d (142.4 overs)	v	Mozoram; 204 (49 overs) & 182 (41.5 overs) (f/o)

Goa won by an innings and 169 runs
Narendra Modi Stadium B Ground, Ahmedabad
Points: Goa 7, Mizoram 0

=== Round 5 ===
13–16 November 2024
Scorecard

Arunachal Pradesh; 84 (30.3 overs) & 92/9 (22.3 overs)	v	Goa; 727/2d (92 overs)

Goa won by an innings and 551 runs
Goa Cricket Association Academy Ground, Porvorim
Points: Goa 7, Arunachal Pradesh 0

13–16 November 2024
Scorecard

Manipur; 357 (117.2 overs) & 224 (78.3 overs)	v	Sikkim; 336 (109.2 overs) & 129/5 (28.5 overs)

Match drawn
Lal Bahadur Shastri Stadium, Anand
Points: Manipur 3, Sikkim 1

13–16 November 2024
Scorecard

Nagaland; 736/7d (169 overs) & 197/1 (45.4 overs)	v	Mizoram; 393 (106 overs)

Match drawn
Gokulbhai Somabhai Patel Stadium, Nadiad
Points: Nagaland 3, Mizoram 1

== Final ==
23–27 January 2025
Scorecard

Goa	v	Nagaland
276 (104.2 overs); Kashyap Bakhale 79 (188); Jagadeesha Suchith 4/69 (34 overs)		216 (66.5 overs); Rongsen Jonathan 86 (116); Heramb Parab 5/30 (12.5 overs)
517/7d (158 overs); Snehal Kauthankar 202* (374); Nagaho Chishi 2/71 (17 overs)		215 (69.3 overs); Hem Chetri 54 (126); Darshan Misal 5/48 (22)

Goa won by 362 runs
Nagaland Cricket Stadium, Sovima
Umpires: Vaibhav Dhokre and Kannur Swaroopanand
Player of the match: Snehal Kauthankar (Goa)

- Goa won the toss and elected to bat.
