= 2025–26 Vijay Hazare Trophy =

Indian cricket tournament

2025-26 Vijay Hazare Trophy
- Dates: 24 December 2025 – 18 January 2026
- Administrator: BCCI
- Cricket format: List A cricket
- Tournament format: Round-robin then knockout
- Champions: Vidarbha (1st title)
- Runners-up: Saurashtra
- Participants: 38
- Matches: 135
- Player of the series: Aman Mokhade (Vidarbha)
- Most runs: Aman Mokhade (814) (Vidarbha)
- Most wickets: Ankur Panwar (25) (Saurashtra)
- Official website: Vijay Hazare Trophy Elite; Vijay Hazare Trophy Plate

The 2025–26 Vijay Hazare Trophy was the 33rd edition of the Vijay Hazare Trophy, an annual List A tournament in India. The tournament took place from 24 December 2025 to 18 January 2026 and featured all 38 teams from the Ranji Trophy. The teams are divided into four elite groups, consisting of eight teams each and one plate group comprising six teams. The tournament was a part of the 2025–26 Indian domestic cricket season, as announced by the Board of Control for Cricket in India (BCCI) in 2025. Karnataka were the defending champions.

In the final Vidarbha defeated Saurashtra by 38 runs to win their maiden title.

== Format ==
The teams are divided into two categories: one named the Elite category, which has 32 teams split into four groups, and one called the Plate category, which has 6 teams in one group. The Elite category teams play each other once, with the top two teams from each group qualifying for the quarter-finals. In the Plate Group, teams also play each other once, but the top two teams qualify for the plate group final. The Plate winner will be promoted to the Elite group for the next season, 2026–27, while the bottom one team of all four Elite groups combined, factoring in both points and the nrr, will be relegated to the Plate group.

Points system
Match result	Points earned
Win	4
No Result	2
Loss	0

== Participants ==
Group A	Group B	Group C	Group D	Plate Group
Karnataka	Vidarbha	Maharashtra	Haryana	Nagaland
Rajasthan	Baroda	Punjab	Gujarat	Bihar
Tamil Nadu	Bengal	Mumbai	Railways	Mizoram
Jharkhand	Hyderabad	Himachal Pradesh	Andhra	Meghalaya
Madhya Pradesh	Uttar Pradesh	Uttarakhand	Saurashtra	Manipur
Pondicherry	Assam	Goa	Delhi	Arunchal Pradesh
Kerala	Chandigarh	Chhattisgarh	Odisha	-
Tripura	Jammu & Kashmir	Sikkim	Services	-

== Standings ==
=== Group A ===
Pos	Team	Pld	W	L	NR	Pts	NRR	Qualification
1	Karnataka	7	6	1	0	24	0.544	Advanced to the Knockout stage
2	Madhya Pradesh	7	5	2	0	20	0.834	Advanced to the Knockout stage
3	Kerala	7	4	3	0	16	0.554	
4	Jharkhand	7	4	3	0	16	−0.042	
5	Tamil Nadu	7	3	4	0	12	0.509	
6	Tripura	7	3	4	0	12	−0.125	
7	Rajasthan	7	2	5	0	8	−0.717	
8	Pondicherry	7	1	6	0	4	−1.849	

Source: ESPNcricinfo

=== Group B ===
Pos	Team	Pld	W	L	NR	Pts	NRR	Qualification
1	Uttar Pradesh	7	7	0	0	28	1.737	Advanced to the Knockout stage
2	Vidarbha	7	5	2	0	20	1.264	Advanced to the Knockout stage
3	Baroda	7	5	2	0	20	0.712	
4	Bengal	7	4	3	0	16	0.366	
5	Jammu & Kashmir	7	3	4	0	12	−0.426	
6	Hyderabad	7	2	5	0	8	0.026	
7	Assam	7	1	6	0	4	−1.380	
8	Chandigarh	7	1	6	0	4	−2.219	

Source: ESPNcricinfo

=== Group C ===
Pos	Team	Pld	W	L	NR	Pts	NRR	Qualification
1	Punjab	7	6	1	0	24	1.377	Advanced to the Knockout stage
2	Mumbai	7	5	2	0	20	0.964	Advanced to the Knockout stage
3	Maharashtra	7	4	3	0	16	1.195	
4	Chhattisgarh	7	4	3	0	16	0.112	
5	Himachal Pradesh	7	3	4	0	12	0.239	
6	Goa	7	3	4	0	12	−0.127	
7	Uttarakhand	7	3	4	0	12	−0.699	
8	Sikkim	7	0	7	0	0	−3.390	Relegation to Plate Group

Source: ESPNcricinfo

=== Group D ===
Pos	Team	Pld	W	L	T	NR	Pts	NRR	Qualification
1	Delhi	7	6	1	0	0	24	1.809	Advanced to the Knockout stage
2	Saurashtra	7	5	2	0	0	20	0.857	Advanced to the Knockout stage
3	Haryana	7	4	2	1	0	18	0.324	
4	Railways	7	4	3	0	0	16	−0.191	
5	Gujarat	7	3	4	0	0	12	0.382	
6	Odisha	7	3	4	0	0	12	−0.109	
7	Andhra	7	2	4	1	0	10	−0.258	
8	Services	7	0	7	0	0	0	−2.177	

Source: ESPNcricinfo

=== Plate Group ===
Pos	Team	Pld	W	L	NR	Pts	NRR	Qualification
1	Bihar	5	5	0	0	20	3.067	Advanced to the Plate Final
2	Manipur	5	4	1	0	16	0.564	Advanced to the Plate Final
3	Nagaland	5	3	2	0	12	1.007	
4	Meghalaya	5	2	3	0	8	0.107	
5	Arunchal Pradesh	5	1	4	0	4	−2.646	
6	Mizoram	5	0	5	0	0	−2.019	

Source: ESPNcricinfo

== Fixtures ==
=== Group A ===
==== Round 1 ====
24 December 2025
Scorecard

Jharkhand; 412/9 (50 overs)	v	Karnataka; 413/5 (47.3 overs)

Karnataka won by 5 wickets
Narendra Modi Stadium B Ground,, Motera, Ahmedabad

24 December 2025
Scorecard

Madhya Pradesh; 287/5 (50 overs)	v	Rajasthan; 188 (43.2 overs)

Madhya Pradesh won by 99 runs
ADSA Railways Cricket Ground, Ahmedabad

24 December 2025
Scorecard

Tamil Nadu; 310/7 (50 overs)	v	Pondicherry; 209 (46.5 overs)

Tamil Nadu won by 101 runs
Narendra Modi Stadium, Motera, Ahmedabad

24 December 2025
Scorecard

Kerala; 348/8 (50 overs)	v	Tripura; 203 (36.5 overs)

Kerala won by 145 runs
Gujarat College Ground, Ahmedabad

==== Round 2 ====
26 December 2025
Scorecard

Jharkhand; 301 (50 overs)	v	Rajasthan; 228 (50 overs)

Jharkhand won by 73 runs
Narendra Modi Stadium, Motera, Ahmedabad

26 December 2025
Scorecard

Kerala; 284/7 (50 overs)	v	Karnataka; 285/2 (48.2 overs)

Karnataka won by 8 wickets
Narendra Modi Stadium B Ground, Motera, Ahmedabad

26 December 2025
Scorecard

Tamil Nadu; 280 (49.3 overs)	v	Madhya Pradesh; 283/8 (49.2 overs)

Madhya Pradesh won by 2 wickets
Gujarat College Ground, Ahmedabad

26 December 2025
Scorecard

Pondicherry; 150 (41.3 overs)	v	Tripura; 151/3 (32.3 overs)

Tripura won by 7 wickets
ADSA Railways Cricket Ground, Ahmedabad

==== Round 3 ====
29 December 2025
Scorecard

Jharkhand; 368/7 (50 overs)	v	Pondicherry; 235 (41.4 overs)

Jharkhand won by 133 runs
Narendra Modi Stadium B Ground, Motera, Ahmedabad

29 December 2025
Scorecard

Tamil Nadu; 288 (49.5 overs)	v	Karnataka; 293/6 (47.1 overs)

Karnataka won by 4 wickets
Gujarat College Ground, Ahmedabad

29 December 2025
Scorecard

Tripura; 286 (49.5 overs)	v	Rajasthan; 220 (44.2 overs)

Tripura won by 66 runs
ADSA Railways Cricket Ground, Ahmedabad

29 December 2025
Scorecard

Madhya Pradesh; 214 (46.1 overs)	v	Kerala; 167 (40.1 overs)

Madhya Pradesh won by 47 runs
Narendra Modi Stadium, Motera, Ahmedabad

==== Round 4 ====
31 December 2025
Scorecard

Tamil Nadu; 243 (45 overs)	v	Jharkhand; 244/1 (41 overs)

Jharkhand won by 9 wickets
Narendra Modi Stadium, Motera, Ahmedabad

31 December 2025
Scorecard

Karnataka; 363/4 (50 overs)	v	Pondicherry; 296 (50 overs)

Karnataka won by 67 runs
ADSA Railways Cricket Ground, Ahmedabad

31 December 2025
Scorecard

Rajasthan; 343/7 (50 overs)	v	Kerala; 348/8 (50 overs)

Kerala won by 2 wickets
Gujarat College Ground, Ahmedabad

31 December 2025
Scorecard

Tripura; 286/7 (50 overs)	v	Madhya Pradesh; 287/6 (44 overs)

Madhya Pradesh won by 4 wickets
Narendra Modi Stadium B Ground, Motera, Ahmedabad

==== Round 5 ====
3 January 2026
Scorecard

Jharkhand; 311/7 (50 overs)	v	Kerala; 313/2 (42.3 overs)

Kerala won by 8 wickets
ADSA Railways Cricket Ground, Ahmedabad

3 January 2026
Scorecard

Rajasthan; 225 (46.5 overs)	v	Tamil Nadu; 215 (41.4 overs)

Rajasthan won by 10 runs
Narendra Modi Stadium B Ground, Motera, Ahmedabad

3 January 2026
Scorecard

Karnataka; 332/7 (50 overs)	v	Tripura; 252 (49 overs)

Karnataka won by 80 runs
Narendra Modi Stadium, Motera, Ahmedabad

3 January 2026
Scorecard

Madhya Pradesh; 228 (49.5 overs)	v	Pondicherry; 229/6 (43 overs)

Puducherry won by 4 wickets
Gujarat College Ground, Ahmedabad

==== Round 6 ====
6 January 2026
Scorecard

Madhya Pradesh; 277 (48.4 overs)	v	Jharkhand; 278/8 (47.4 overs)

Jharkhand won by 2 wickets
ADSA Railways Cricket Ground, Ahmedabad

6 January 2026
Scorecard

Karnataka; 324/7 (50 overs)	v	Rajasthan; 174 (38 overs)

Karnataka won by 150 runs
Gujarat College Ground Ahmedabad

6 January 2026
Scorecard

Tamil Nadu; 259/6 (50 overs)	v	Tripura; 205 (42.4 overs)

Tamil Nadu won by 54 runs
Narendra Modi Stadium B Ground, Motera, Ahmedabad

6 January 2026
Scorecard

Pondicherry; 247 (47.4 overs)	v	Kerala; 252/2 (29 overs)

Kerala won by 8 wickets
Narendra Modi Stadium, Motera, Ahmedabad

==== Round 7 ====
8 January 2026
Scorecard

Tripura; 320 (50 overs)	v	Jharkhand; 123 (31.1 overs)

Tripura won by 197 runs
Gujarat College Ground, Ahmedabad

8 January 2026
Scorecard

Karnataka; 207 (47.4 overs)	v	Madhya Pradesh; 208/3 (23.2 overs)

Madhya Pradesh won by 7 wickets
Narendra Modi Stadium, Motera, Ahmedabad

8 January 2026
Scorecard

Rajasthan; 269/8 (50 overs)	v	Pondicherry; 137 (26.5 overs)

Rajasthan won by 132 runs
Narendra Modi Stadium B Ground, Motera, Ahmedabad

8 January 2026
Scorecard

Tamil Nadu; 294/8 (50 overs)	v	Kerala; 217 (40.2 overs)

Tamil Nadu won by 77 runs
ADSA Railways Cricket Ground, Ahmedabad

=== Group B ===
==== Round 1 ====
24 December 2025
Scorecard

Vidarbha; 382/5 (50 overs)	v	Bengal; 383/7 (48.5 overs)

Bengal won by 3 wickets
Sanosara Cricket Ground A, Rajkot

24 December 2025
Scorecard

Assam; 282 (48.4 overs)	v	Baroda; 283/5 (47.5 overs)

Baroda won by 5 wickets
Niranjan Shah Stadium C, Rajkot

24 December 2025
Scorecard

Uttar Pradesh; 324/5 (50 overs)	v	Hyderabad; 240 (43 overs)

Uttar Pradesh won by 84 runs
Niranjan Shah Stadium, Rajkot

24 December 2025
Scorecard

Chandigarh; 208 (39.5 overs)	v	Jammu & Kashmir; 209/0 (37 overs)

Jammu & Kashmir won by 10 wickets
Sanosara Cricket Ground B, Rajkot

==== Round 2 ====
26 December 2025
Scorecard

Vidarbha; 365/5 (50 overs)	v	Hyderabad; 276 (49.2 overs)

Vidarbha won by 89 runs
Sanosara Cricket Ground B, Rajkot

26 December 2025
Scorecard

Uttar Pradesh; 367/4 (50 overs)	v	Chandigarh; 140 (29.3 overs)

Uttar Pradesh won by 227 runs
Sanosara Cricket Ground A, Rajkot

26 December 2025
Scorecard

Bengal; 205 (38.3 overs)	v	Baroda; 209/6 (38.5 overs)

Baroda won by 4 wickets
Niranjan Shah Stadium C, Rajkot

26 December 2025
Scorecard

Jammu & Kashmir; 341/7 (50 overs)	v	Assam; 199 (36.1 overs)

Jammu & Kashmir won by 142 runs
Niranjan Shah Stadium, Rajkot

==== Round 3 ====
29 December 2025
Scorecard

Jammu & Kashmir; 311/9 (50 overs)	v	Vidarbha; 315/5 (48.3 overs)

Vidarbha won by 5 wickets
Sanosara Cricket Ground B, Rajkot

29 December 2025
Scorecard

Uttar Pradesh; 369/7 (50 overs)	v	Baroda; 315 (50 overs)

Uttar Pradesh won by 54 runs
Sanosara Cricket Ground A, Rajkot

29 December 2025
Scorecard

Hyderabad; 310/8 (50 overs)	v	Assam; 314/6 (49.3 overs)

Assam won by 4 wickets
Niranjan Shah Stadium C, Rajkot

29 December 2025
Scorecard

Chandigarh; 319 (48.2 overs)	v	Bengal; 320/4 (47.4 overs)

Bengal won by 6 wickets
Niranjan Shah Stadium, Rajkot

==== Round 4 ====
31 December 2025
Scorecard

Baroda; 417/4 (50 overs)	v	Hyderabad; 380 (49.5 overs)

Baroda won by 37 runs
Sanosara Cricket Ground B, Rajkot

31 December 2025
Scorecard

Jammu & Kashmir; 63 (20.4 overs)	v	Bengal; 64/1 (9.3 overs)

Bengal won by 9 wickets
Sanosara Cricket Ground A, Rajkot

31 December 2025
Scorecard

Chandigarh; 113 (29.1 overs)	v	Vidarbha; 114/2 (22.3 overs)

Vidarbha won by 8 wickets
Niranjan Shah Stadium Ground C, Rajkot

31 December 2025
Scorecard

Assam; 308 (48.4 overs)	v	Uttar Pradesh; 291/2 (42 overs)

Uttar Pradesh won by 58 runs (VJD method)
Niranjan Shah Stadium, Rajkot

==== Round 5 ====
3 January 2026
Scorecard

Bengal; 302/7 (50 overs)	v	Assam; 217 (42.1 overs)

Bengal won by 85 runs
Sanosara Cricket Ground B, Rajkot

3 January 2026
Scorecard

Hyderabad; 286/9 (50 overs)	v	Chandigarh; 150 (37.4 overs)

Hyderabad won by 136 runs
Sanosara Cricket Ground A, Rajkot

3 January 2026
Scorecard

Uttar Pradesh; 322/5 (48 overs)	v	Jammu & Kashmir; 264/8 (48 overs)

Uttar Pradesh won by 58 runs
Niranjan Shah Stadium C, Rajkot

3 January 2026
Scorecard

Baroda; 293/9 (50 overs)	v	Vidarbha; 296/1 (41.4 overs)

Vidarbha won by 9 wickets
Niranjan Shah Stadium, Rajkot

==== Round 6 ====
6 January 2026
Scorecard

Assam; 284/7 (50 overs)	v	Chandigarh; 286/3 (47.2 overs)

Chandigarh won by 7 wickets
Sanosara Cricket Ground B, Rajkot

6 January 2026
Scorecard

Baroda; 332 (50 overs)	v	Jammu & Kashmir; 256 (45.3 overs)

Baroda won by 76 runs
Sanosara Cricket Ground A, Rajkot

6 January 2026
Scorecard

Uttar Pradesh; 339/5 (50 overs)	v	Vidarbha; 285/9 (50 overs)

Uttar Pradesh won by 54 runs
Niranjan Shah Stadium C, Rajkot

6 January 2026
Scorecard

Hyderabad; 352/5 (50 overs)	v	Bengal; 245 (44.4 overs)

Hyderabad won by 107 runs
Niranjan Shah Stadium, Rajkot

==== Round 7 ====
8 January 2026
Scorecard

Bengal; 269 (45.1 overs)	v	Uttar Pradesh; 272/5 (42.2 overs)

Uttar Pradesh won by 5 wickets
Sanosara Cricket Ground B, Rajkot

8 January 2026
Scorecard

Vidarbha; 308/7 (50 overs)	v	Assam; 148 (35 overs)

Vidarbha won by 160 runs
Sanosara Cricket Ground A, Rajkot

8 January 2026
Scorecard

Hyderabad; 268/9 (50 overs)	v	Jammu & Kashmir; 272/7 (47.5 overs)

Jammu & Kashmir won by 3 wickets
Niranjan Shah Stadium C, Rajkot

8 January 2026
Scorecard

Baroda; 391 (49.1 overs)	v	Chandigarh; 242 (40 overs)

Baroda won by 149 runs
Niranjan Shah Stadium, Rajkot

=== Group C ===
==== Round 1 ====
24 December 2025
Scorecard

Punjab; 347/6 (50 overs)	v	Maharashtra; 296/8 (50 overs)

Punjab won by 51 runs
Anantam Ground, Jaipur

24 December 2025
Scorecard

Himachal Pradesh; 259 (47.3 overs)	v	Uttarakhand; 164 (40.3 overs)

Himachal Pradesh won by 95 runs
KL Saini Ground, Jaipur

24 December 2025
Scorecard

Chhattisgarh; 233 (48.5 overs)	v	Goa; 234/4 (44.1 overs)

Goa won by 6 wickets
Jaipuria Vidhyalaya Ground, Jaipur

24 December 2025
Scorecard

Sikkim; 236/7 (50 overs)	v	Mumbai; 237/2 (30.3 overs)

Mumbai won by 8 wickets
Sawai Mansingh Stadium, Jaipur

==== Round 2 ====
26 December 2025
Scorecard

Mumbai; 331/7 (50 overs)	v	Uttarakhand; 280/9 (50 overs)

Mumbai won by 51 runs
Sawai Mansingh Stadium, Jaipur

26 December 2025
Scorecard

Sikkim; 150 (40.2 overs)	v	Maharashtra; 153/2 (18 overs)

Maharashtra won by 8 wickets
KL Saini Stadium, Jaipur

26 December 2025
Scorecard

Goa; 285/9 (50 overs)	v	Himachal Pradesh; 277 (49.3 overs)

Goa won by 8 runs
Jaipuria Vidhyalaya Ground, Jaipur

26 December 2025
Scorecard

Chhattisgarh; 253 (48.4 overs)	v	Punjab; 254/1 (42.1 overs)

Punjab won by 9 wickets
Anantam Ground, Jaipur

==== Round 3 ====
29 December 2025
Scorecard

Punjab; 269/8 (50 overs)	v	Uttarakhand; 270/5 (47.4 overs)

Uttarakhand won by 5 wickets
Anantam Ground, Jaipur

29 December 2025
Scorecard

Goa; 309/8 (50 overs)	v	Sikkim; 247/7 (50 overs)

Goa won by 62 runs
KL Saini Stadium, Jaipur

29 December 2025
Scorecard

Chhattisgarh; 142 (38.1 overs)	v	Mumbai; 144/1 (24 overs)

Mumbai won by 9 wickets
Jaipuria Vidhyalaya Ground, Jaipur

29 December 2025
Scorecard

Himachal Pradesh; 271 (49.4 overs)	v	Maharashtra; 264/9 (50 overs)

Himachal Pradesh won by 7 runs
Sawai Mansingh Stadium, Jaipur

==== Round 4 ====
31 December 2025
Scorecard

Mumbai; 444/8 (50 overs)	v	Goa; 357/9 (50 overs)

Mumbai won by 87 runs
Anantam Ground, Jaipur

31 December 2025
Scorecard

Himachal Pradesh; 221 (47.2 overs)	v	Punjab; 223/4 (36.1 overs)

Punjab won by 6 wickets
KL Saini Stadium, Jaipur

31 December 2025
Scorecard

Maharashtra; 331/7 (50 overs)	v	Uttarakhand; 202 (43.4 overs)

Maharashtra won by 129 runs
Jaipuria Vidhyalaya Ground, Jaipur

31 December 2025
Scorecard

Chhattisgarh; 355/3 (50 overs)	v	Sikkim; 126 (34 overs)

Chhattisgarh won by 229 runs
Sawai Mansingh Stadium, Jaipur

==== Round 5 ====
3 January 2026
Scorecard

Himachal Pradesh; 320/8 (50 overs)	v	Chhattisgarh; 321/7 (49.4 overs)

Chhattisgarh won by 3 wickets
Anantam Ground, Jaipur

3 January 2026
Scorecard

Maharashtra; 366/4 (50 overs)	v	Mumbai; 238 (42 overs)

Maharashtra won by 128 runs
KL Saini Stadium, Jaipur

3 January 2026
Scorecard

Sikkim; 75 (22.2 overs)	v	Punjab; 81/0 (6.2 overs)

Punjab won by 10 wickets
Jaipuria Vidhyalaya Ground, Jaipur

3 January 2026
Scorecard

Goa; 270 (49.1 overs)	v	Uttarakhand; 274/3 (46.2 overs)

Uttarakhand won by 7 wickets
Sawai Mansingh Stadium, Jaipur

==== Round 6 ====
6 January 2026
Scorecard

Chhattisgarh; 166 (29 overs)	v	Maharashtra; 160/8 (31 overs)

Chhattisgarh won by 6 runs
Anantam Ground, Jaipur

6 January 2026
Scorecard

Goa; 211 (33.3 overs)	v	Punjab; 212/4 (35 overs)

Punjab won by 6 wickets
KL Saini Stadium, Jaipur

6 January 2026
Scorecard

Sikkim; 219/8 (33 overs)	v	Uttarakhand; 223/4 (31.1 overs)

Uttarakhand won by 6 wickets
Jaipuria Vidhyalaya Ground, Jaipur

6 January 2026
Scorecard

Mumbai; 299/9 (33 overs)	v	Himachal Pradesh; 292 (32.4 overs)

Mumbai won by 7 runs
Sawai Mansingh Stadium, Jaipur

==== Round 7 ====
8 January 2026
Scorecard

Sikkim; 160/6 (38 overs)	v	Himachal Pradesh; 163/1 (26.1 overs)

Himachal Pradesh won by 9 wickets
Anantam Ground, Jaipur

8 January 2026
Scorecard

Chhattisgarh; 265 (50 overs)	v	Uttarakhand; 258/8 (50 overs)

Chhattisgarh won by 7 runs
KL Saini Stadium, Jaipur

8 January 2026
Scorecard

Punjab; 216 (45.1 overs)	v	Mumbai; 215 (26.2 overs)

Punjab won by 1 run
Jaipuria Vidhyalaya Ground, Jaipur

8 January 2026
Scorecard

Maharashtra; 249/7 (50 overs)	v	Goa; 244/9 (50 overs)

Maharashtra won by 5 runs
Sawai Mansingh Stadium, Jaipur

=== Group D ===
==== Round 1 ====
24 December 2025
Scorecard

Haryana; 267/9 (50 overs)	v	Railways; 270/4 (43.4 overs)

Railways won by 6 wickets
KSCA Cricket (3) Ground, Alur

24 December 2025
Scorecard

Services; 184 (42.2 overs)	v	Gujarat; 185/2 (34.5 overs)

Gujarat won by 8 wickets
KSCA Cricket (2) Ground, Alur

24 December 2025
Scorecard

Andhra; 298/8 (50 overs)	v	Delhi; 300/6 (37.4 overs)

Delhi won by 4 wickets
BCCI Centre of Excellence Ground 1, Bengaluru

24 December 2025
Scorecard

Odisha; 345/6 (50 overs)	v	Saurashtra; 347/5 (48.5 overs)

Saurashtra won by 5 wickets
Three Ovals KSCA Stadium, Alur

==== Round 2 ====
26 December 2025
Scorecard

Services; 83 (21.5 overs)	v	Odisha; 84/6 (24.3 overs)

Odisha won by 4 wickets
KSCA Cricket (3) Ground, Alur

26 December 2025
Scorecard

Saurashtra; 253 (48.1 overs)	v	Haryana; 256/4 (39 overs)

Haryana won by 6 wickets
KSCA Cricket (2) Ground, Alur

26 December 2025
Scorecard

Delhi; 254/9 (50 overs)	v	Gujarat; 247 (47.4 overs)

Delhi won by 7 runs
BCCI Centre of Excellence Ground 1, Bengaluru

26 December 2025
Scorecard

Railways; 266/9 (50 overs)	v	Andhra; 271/4 (44.4 overs)

Andhra won by 6 wickets
Three Ovals KSCA Stadium, Alur

==== Round 3 ====
29 December 2025
Scorecard

Railways; 365/7 (50 overs)	v	Services; 281 (47.2 overs)

Railways won by 84 runs
KSCA Cricket (3) Ground, Alur

29 December 2025
Scorecard

Saurashtra; 320/7 (50 overs)	v	Delhi; 321/7 (48.5 overs)

Delhi won by 3 wickets
KSCA Cricket (2) Ground, Alur

29 December 2025
Scorecard

Andhra; 221 (49.2 overs)	v	Odisha; 223/4 (43.4 overs)

Odisha won by 6 wickets
Three Ovals KSCA Stadium, Alur

29 December 2025
Scorecard

Haryana; 299 (49.4 overs)	v	Gujarat; 273 (47.1 overs)

Haryana won by 26 runs
BCCI Centre of Excellence Ground 1, Bengaluru

==== Round 4 ====
31 December 2025
Scorecard

Odisha; 272/8 (50 overs)	v	Delhi; 193 (45.3 overs)

Odisha won by 79 runs
KSCA Cricket (3) Ground, Alur

31 December 2025
Scorecard

Gujarat; 283 (47.4 overs)	v	Railways; 287/6 (48 overs)

Railways won by 4 wickets
KSCA Cricket (2) Ground, Alur

31 December 2025
Scorecard

Services; 271/8 (50 overs)	v	Haryana; 275/3 (43.1 overs)

Haryana won by 7 wickets
Three Ovals KSCA Stadium, Alur

31 December 2025
Scorecard

Saurashtra; 254/7 (50 overs)	v	Andhra; 180 (47.2 overs)

Saurashtra won by 74 runs
BCCI Centre of Excellence Ground 2, Bengaluru

==== Round 5 ====
3 January 2026
Scorecard

Gujarat; 318/9 (50 overs)	v	Andhra; 311/7 (50 overs)

Gujarat won by 7 runs
KSCA Cricket (3) Ground, Alur

3 January 2026
Scorecard

Odisha; 305/9 (50 overs)	v	Haryana; 309/6 (48.4 overs)

Haryana won by 4 wickets
KSCA Cricket (2) Ground, Alur

3 January 2026
Scorecard

Saurashtra; 294/8 (50 overs)	v	Railways; 263 (49.1 overs)

Saurashtra won by 31 runs
Three Ovals KSCA Stadium, Alur

3 January 2026
Scorecard

Services; 178 (42.5 overs)	v	Delhi; 182/2 (19.4 overs)

Delhi won by 8 wickets
BCCI Centre of Excellence Ground 2, Bengaluru

==== Round 6 ====
6 January 2026
Scorecard

Andhra; 324 (49.5 overs)	v	Haryana; 307/7 (48 overs)

Match tied (VJD method)
KSCA Cricket (3) Ground, Alur

6 January 2026
Scorecard

Railways; 179 (40.4 overs)	v	Delhi; 182/4 (21.4 overs)

Delhi won by 6 wickets
KSCA Cricket (2) Ground, Alur

6 January 2026
Scorecard

Saurashtra; 349/5 (50 overs)	v	Services; 238 (45.5 overs)

Saurashtra won by 111 runs
Three Ovals KSCA Stadium, Alur

6 January 2026
Scorecard

Gujarat; 333/6 (50 overs)	v	Odisha; 100 (28.1 overs)

Gujarat won by 233 runs
BCCI Centre of Excellence Ground 3, Bengaluru

==== Round 7 ====
8 January 2026
Scorecard

Saurashtra; 383/4 (50 overs)	v	Gujarat; 238 (40 overs)

Saurashtra won by 145 runs
KSCA Cricket (3) Ground, Alur

8 January 2026
Scorecard

Services; 165 (45 overs)	v	Andhra; 168/5 (38.1 overs)

Andhra won by 5 wickets
KSCA Cricket (2) Ground, Alur

8 January 2026
Scorecard

Odisha; 251 (49.5 overs)	v	Railways; 254/5 (45.2 overs)

Railways won by 5 wickets
Three Ovals KSCA Stadium, Alur

8 January 2026
Scorecard

Haryana; 105 (25.4 overs)	v	Delhi; 107/1 (13.3 overs)

Delhi won by 9 wickets
M. Chinnaswamy Stadium, Bengaluru

=== Plate Group ===
==== Round 1 ====
24 December 2025
Scorecard

Nagaland; 236 (48.3 overs)	v	Manipur; 241/9 (49.5 overs)

Manipur won by 1 wicket
Usha Martin Ground, Ranchi

24 December 2025
Scorecard

Bihar; 574/6 (50 overs)	v	Arunchal Pradesh; 177 (42.1 overs)

Bihar won by 397 runs
JSCA Oval Ground, Ranchi

24 December 2025
Scorecard

Meghalaya; 291 (49.5 overs)	v	Mizoram; 212 (38.5 overs)

Meghalaya won by 79 runs
JSCA International Stadium Complex, Ranchi

==== Round 2 ====
26 December 2025
Scorecard

Meghalaya; 190 (49.3 overs)	v	Nagaland; 192/3 (36.5 overs)

Nagaland won by 7 wickets
Usha Martin Ground, Ranchi

26 December 2025
Scorecard

Arunchal Pradesh; 254 (49.4 overs)	v	Mizoram; 219 (44.4 overs)

Arunachal Pradesh won by 35 runs
JSCA Oval Ground, Ranchi

26 December 2025
Scorecard

Bihar; 284 (50 overs)	v	Manipur; 269/9 (50 overs)

Bihar won by 15 runs
JSCA International Stadium Complex, Ranchi

==== Round 3 ====
29 December 2025
Scorecard

Arunchal Pradesh; 246 (49.5 overs)	v	Manipur; 250/6 (46.3 overs)

Manipur won by 4 wickets
Usha Martin Ground, Ranchi

29 December 2025
Scorecard

Nagaland; 399/4 (50 overs)	v	Mizoram; 222 (42 overs)

Nagaland won by 177 runs
JSCA Oval Ground, Ranchi

29 December 2025
Scorecard

Meghalaya; 217/9 (50 overs)	v	Bihar; 220/2 (32.3 overs)

Bihar won by 8 wickets
JSCA International Stadium Complex, Ranchi

==== Round 4 ====
31 December 2025
Scorecard

Arunchal Pradesh; 189 (44.2 overs)	v	Meghalaya; 193/4 (23.1 overs)

Meghalaya won by 6 wickets
Usha Martin Ground, Ranchi

31 December 2025
Scorecard

Nagaland; 212 (46.1 overs)	v	Bihar; 214/2 (37.5 overs)

Bihar won by 8 wickets
JSCA Oval Ground, Ranchi

31 December 2025
Scorecard

Mizoram; 200 (45.5 overs)	v	Manipur; 205/2 (34.1 overs)

Manipur won by 8 wickets
JSCA International Stadium Complex, Ranchi

==== Round 5 ====
3 January 2026
Scorecard

Mizoram; 258 (45.4 overs)	v	Bihar; 262/5 (34.1 overs)

Bihar won by 5 wickets
Usha Martin Ground, Ranchi

3 January 2026
Scorecard

Meghalaya; 238 (45 overs)	v	Manipur; 241/7 (43.3 overs)

Manipur won by 3 wickets
JSCA Oval Ground, Ranchi

3 January 2026
Scorecard

Arunchal Pradesh; 244/6 (50 overs)	v	Nagaland; 245/1 (39.2 overs)

Nagaland won by 9 wickets
JSCA International Stadium Complex, Ranchi

==== Plate Final ====
6 January 2026
09:00
Scorecard

Manipur; 169 (47.5 overs)	v	Bihar; 170/4 (31.2 overs)
Ulenyai Khwairakpam 61 (112); Shabbir Khan 7/30 (8 overs)		Ayush Loharuka 75 (72); Bishworjit Konthoujam 1/33 (8 overs)

Bihar won by 6 wickets
JSCA International Stadium Complex, Ranchi
Umpires: Pranav Joshi and Sivasubramaniyan Shankar
Player of the match: Shabbir Khan (Bihar)

- Bihar won the toss and elected to field.
- Shabbir Khan (Bihar) took his maiden five-wicket haul in List A cricket.

== Knockout stage ==
Quarter-finals
A1	Karnataka	187/1 (33 overs)
C2	Mumbai	254/8 (50 overs)
D1	Delhi	224 (45.1 overs)
B2	Vidarbha	300/9 (50 overs)
B1	Uttar Pradesh	310/8 (50 overs)
D2	Saurashtra	238/3 (40.1 overs)
C1	Punjab	345/6 (50 overs)
A2	Madhya Pradesh	162 (31.2 overs)

Semi-finals
QF1	Karnataka	280 (49.4 overs)
QF4	Vidarbha	284/4 (46.2 overs)
QF2	Saurashtra	293/1 (39.3 overs)
QF3	Punjab	291 (50 overs)

Final
SF1	Vidarbha	317/8 (50 overs)
SF2	Saurashtra	279 (48.5 overs)

=== Quarter-finals ===
1st quarter final
12 January 2026
09:00
Scorecard

Mumbai; 254/8 (50 overs)	v	Karnataka; 187/1 (33 overs)
Shams Mulani 86 (91); Vidyadhar Patil 3/42 (10 overs)		Devdutt Padikkal 81* (95); Mohit Avasthi 1/24 (6 overs)

Karnataka won by 55 runs (VJD method)
BCCI Centre of Excellence Ground 1, Bengaluru
Umpires: Kannur Swaroopanand and Akshay Totre
Player of the match: Devdutt Padikkal (Karnataka)

- Karnataka won the toss and elected to field.
- Karnataka were 55 runs ahead of the VJD par score when rain stopped play in the 2nd innings.

2nd quarter final
12 January 2026
09:00
Scorecard

Uttar Pradesh; 310/8 (50 overs)	v	Saurashtra; 238/3 (40.1 overs)
Sameer Rizvi 88* (77); Chetan Sakariya 3/54 (10 overs)		Harvik Desai 100* (116); Karan Chaudhary 1/33 (5.1 overs)

Saurashtra won by 17 runs (VJD method)
BCCI Centre of Excellence Ground 2, Bengaluru
Umpires: Abhijeet Bengeri and Amit Rana
Player of the match: Prerak Mankad (Saurashtra)

- Saurashtra won the toss and elected to field.
- Vineet Panwar (Uttar Pradesh) made his List A debut.
- Saurashtra were 17 runs ahead of the VJD par score when rain stopped play in the 2nd innings.

3rd quarter final
13 January 2026
09:00
Scorecard

Punjab; 345/6 (50 overs)	v	Madhya Pradesh; 162 (31.2 overs)
Prabhsimran Singh 88 (86); Venkatesh Iyer 2/60 (7 overs)		Rajat Patidar 38 (40); Sanvir Singh 3/31 (6 overs)

Punjab won by 183 runs
BCCI Centre of Excellence Ground 1, Bengaluru
Umpires: Ulhas Gandhe and Amit Rana
Player of the match: Prabhsimran Singh (Punjab)

- Madhya Pradesh won the toss and elected to field.
- Prabhsimran Singh (Punjab) scored his 2,000th run in List A cricket.

4th quarter final
13 January 2026
09:00
Scorecard

Vidarbha; 300/9 (50 overs)	v	Delhi; 224 (45.1 overs)
Yash Rathod 86 (73); Nitish Rana 2/19 (3 overs)		Anuj Rawat 66 (98); Nachiket Bhute 4/51 (7.1 overs)

Vidarbha won by 76 runs
BCCI Centre of Excellence Ground 2, Bengaluru
Umpires: Abhijeet Bengeri and Saidharshan Kumar
Player of the match: Yash Rathod (Vidarbha)

- Delhi won the toss and elected to field.
- Rohit Binkar (Vidarbha) made his List A debuts.
- Yash Rathod (Vidarbha) and Priyansh Arya (Delhi) both socred their 1,000th run in List A cricket.
- Ishant Sharma (Delhi) took his 200th wicket in List A cricket.

=== Semi-finals ===
1st semi-final
15 January 2026
13:00 (D/N)
Scorecard

Karnataka; 280 (49.4 overs)	v	Vidarbha; 284/4 (46.2 overs)
Karun Nair 76 (90); Darshan Nalkande 5/48 (10 overs)		Aman Mokhade 138 (122); Abhilash Shetty 3/48 (10 overs)

Vidarbha won by 6 wickets
BCCI Centre of Excellence Ground 1, Bengaluru
Umpires: Amit Rana and Akshay Totre
Player of the match: Aman Mokhade (Vidarbha)

- Karnataka won the toss and elected to bat.
- Aman Mokhade (Vidarbha) scored his 1,000th run in List A cricket.
- Aman Mokhade equals the record of 1,000 runs in List A cricket in terms of innings (16).

2nd semi-final
16 January 2026
13:00 (D/N)
Scorecard

Punjab; 291 (50 overs)	v	Saurashtra; 293/1 (39.3 overs)
Anmolpreet Singh 100 (105); Chetan Sakariya 4/60 (10 overs)		Vishvaraj Jadeja 165* (127); Gurnoor Brar 1/52 (7 overs)

Saurashtra won by 9 wickets
BCCI Centre of Excellence Ground 1, Bengaluru
Umpires: Ulhas Gandhe and Saidharshan Kumar
Player of the match: Vishvaraj Jadeja (Saurashtra)

- Saurashtra won the toss and elected to field.
- Prerak Mankad (Saurashtra) scored his 2,000th run in List A cricket.

=== Final ===
Final
18 January 2026
13:00 (D/N)
Scorecard

Vidarbha; 317/8 (50 overs)	v	Saurashtra; 279 (48.5 overs)
Atharva Taide 128 (118); Ankur Panwar 4/65 (10 overs)		Prerak Mankad 88 (92); Yash Thakur 4/50 (9.5 overs)

Vidarbha won by 38 runs
BCCI Centre of Excellence Ground 1, Bengaluru
Umpires: Kannur Swaroopanand and Akshay Totre
Player of the match: Atharva Taide (Vidarbha)

- Saurashtra won the toss and elected to field.
- Ganesh Bhosle (Vidarbha) and Ansh Gosai (Saurashtra) both made their List A debuts.
