= 2024–25 Ranji Trophy Group C =

- Dates: 11 October 2024 – 2 February 2025
- Administrator: BCCI
- Cricket format: First-class cricket
- Tournament format: Round-robin then knockout
- Host: India
- Participants: 8
- Matches: 28

The 2024–25 Ranji Trophy is the 90th season of the Ranji Trophy, the premier first-class cricket tournament in India. It is contested by 38 teams, divided into four elite groups and a plate group, with eight teams in Group C. It took place between 11 October 2024 to 2 February 2025.

== Points table ==
Pos	Team	Pld	W	L	T	D	NR	Pts	Quot
1	Haryana	7	3	0	0	4	0	29	1.212
2	Kerala	7	3	0	0	4	0	28	1.813
3	Bengal	7	2	1	0	3	1	21	1.175
4	Karnataka	7	2	0	0	5	0	20	1.194
5	Madhya Pradesh	7	1	1	0	5	0	14	1.157
6	Uttar Pradesh	7	1	1	0	5	0	14	0.988
7	Punjab	7	1	4	0	2	0	11	0.826
8	Bihar	7	0	6	0	0	1	1	0.345

Source: ESPNcricinfo

Advances to Quarter-final Relegated to Plate Group for next season

== Fixtures ==
=== Round 1 ===
11-14 October 2024

Punjab	v	Kerala
194/10 (82.5 overs); Ramandeep Singh 43 (72); Aditya Sarwate 5/62 (33 overs)		179/10 (70.4 overs); Mohammed Azharuddeen 38 (55); Mayank Markande 6/59 (21.4 overs)
142/10 (55.1 overs); Prabhsimran Singh 51 (49); Baba Aparajith 4/35 (15 overs)		158/2 (36 overs); Sachin Baby 56 (114); Mayank Markande 1/29 (8 overs)

Kerala won by 8 wickets
St Xavier College Ground, Thiruvananthapuram
Umpires: Sundaram Ravi and Ulhas Gandhe
Player of the match: Aditya Sarwate (Kerala)

- Punjab won the toss and elected to bat.

11-14 October 2024

Bihar	v	Haryana
78/10 (28.3 overs); Akash Raj 29 (20); Aman Kumar 3/18 (7 overs)		254/10 (74.2 overs); Jayant Yadav 55 (106); Himanshu Singh 4/49 (19 overs)
133/10 (39.5 overs); Sharman Nigrodh 32 (48); Jayant Yadav 5/57 (15 overs)

Haryana won by an innings and 43 runs
Ch Bansi Lal Cricket Stadium, Rohtak
Umpires: Pashchim Pathak and Bhavesh Patel
Player of the match: Jayant Yadav (Harayana)

- Haryana won the toss and elected to field

11-14 October 2024

Bengal	v	Uttar Pradesh
311/10 (96.2 overs); Sudip Chatterjee 116 (227); Yash Dayal 4/27 (14.2 overs)		292/10 (89.4 overs); Aryan Juyal 92 (214); Mukesh Kumar 4/43 (20.4 overs)
254/3 d (61 overs); Abhimanyu Easwaran 127* (172); Vipraj Nigam (17 overs)		162/6 (51 overs); Priyam Garg 105* (157); Mohammed Kaif 2/4 (5 overs)

Match Drawn
Bharat Ratna Shri Atal Bihari Vajpayee Ekana Cricket Stadium, Lucknow
Umpires: Nikhil Patwardhan and Tapan Sharma
Player of the match: Sudip Chatterjee (Bengal)

- Bengal won the toss and elected to bat

11-14 October 2024

Madhya Pradesh	v	Karnataka
425/8d (140 overs); Shubam Sharma 143* (243); Vasuki Koushik 2/78 (36 overs)		206/5 (75 overs); Nikin Jose 99 (216); Kumar Kartikeya 3/68 (33 overs)

Match Drawn
Holkar Cricket Stadium, Indore
Umpires: Abhijit Bhattacharya and Saiyed Khalid
Player of the match: Shubam Sharma (Madhya Pradesh)

- Karnataka won the toss and elected to field

=== Round 2 ===
18-21 October 2024

Bengal	v	Bihar

Match abandoned without a ball being bowled
Bengal Cricket Academy Ground, Kalyani

18-21 October 2024

Haryana	v	Uttar Pradesh
453/10 (191.2 overs); Himanshu Rana 114 (176); Shivam Sharma 4/95 (58.2 overs)		364/10 (93.2 overs); Aryan Juyal 119 (199); Jayant Yadav 4/102 (26 overs)
72/3 (25 overs); Mayank Shandilya 31 (41); Shivam Sharma 2/22 (9 overs)

Match Drawn
Dr Akhilesh Das Stadium, Lucknow
Player of the match: Himanshu Rana (Haryana)

- Haryana won the toss and elected to bat

18-21 October 2024

Punjab	v	Madhya Pradesh
277/10		207/10; Rajat Patidar 90 (178)
329/6 (103 overs) Avesh Khan 3/51		146/8 (73 overs)

Match Drawn
Maharaja Yadavindra Singh International Cricket Stadium, Mullanpur
Player of the match: Sahil Arora (Punjab)

- Punjab won the toss and chose to bat

18-21 October 2024

v

=== Round 3 ===
v

v

v

v

=== Round 4 ===
v

v

v

v

=== Round 5 ===
v

v

v

v

=== Round 6 ===
v

v

v

v

=== Round 7 ===
30 January–2 February 2025
Scorecard

Punjab; 191 (57.2 overs) & 139 (35.4 overs)	v	Bengal; 343 (92.4 overs)

Bengal won by an innings and 13 runs
Eden Gardens, Kolkata
Points: Bengal 7, Punjab 0

30 January–2 February 2025
Scorecard

Karnataka; 304 (101 overs) & 108/3 (32 overs)	v	Haryana; 450 (115.3 overs)

Stumps, Day 3
M. Chinnaswamy Stadium, Bengaluru

30 January–2 February 2025
Scorecard

Kerala; 351 (101.2 overs)	v	Bihar; 64 (23.1 overs) & 118 (41.1 overs) (f/o)

Kerala won by an innings and 169 runs
St Xavier's College Ground, Thumba
Points: Kerala 7, Bihar 0

30 January–2 February 2025
Scorecard

Madhya Pradesh; 670/7d (160 overs)	v	Uttar Pradesh; 404/2 (105 overs)

Stumps, Day 3
Holkar Stadium, Indore
