= List of international cricket centuries by Virender Sehwag =

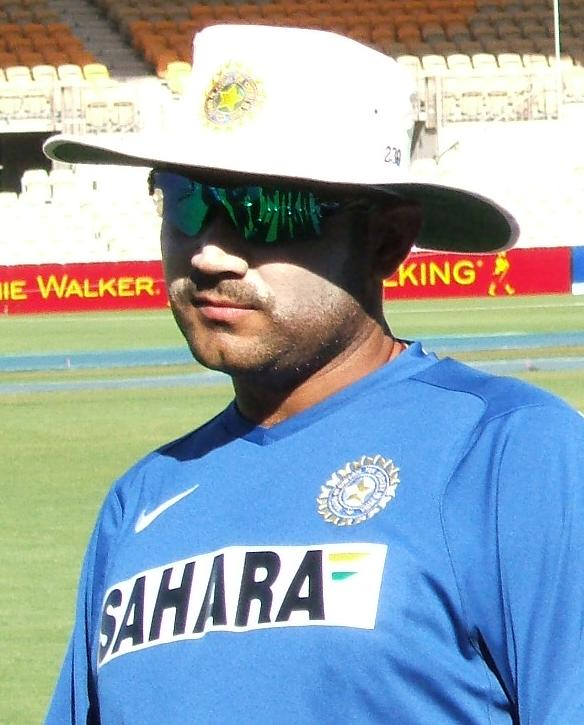
Virender Sehwag scored 23 centuries in Test matches and 15 in One Day Internationals for India.

Virender Sehwag is an Indian cricketer whose aggressive batting has found success at the top of the batting order. He has scored centuries (100 or more runs) on 23 occasions in Test cricket and in 15 One Day International (ODI) matches but has not scored a century in a Twenty20 international.

In Tests, Sehwag has scored centuries against all the Test-cricket playing nations except Bangladesh and Zimbabwe, and is fifth on the list of leading Test century makers for India. In 2001, he became the eleventh Indian player to score a century on Test debut, with 105 runs against South Africa. His centuries have been scored at fourteen cricket grounds, eight of which were outside India. He has made six scores of 200 runs or more, of which a record three have come against Pakistan. (Note: Kumar Sangakkara is the other player with three double centuries against Pakistan.) One such innings, the 254 in Lahore, had him involved in a 410-run partnership with Rahul Dravid, which came within 3 runs of breaking the record for the highest first-wicket partnership in Tests, set by Pankaj Roy and Vinoo Mankad. The innings took only 247 balls and was the highest score at faster than a run a ball. Sehwag is the first Indian to score a triple century (300 or more runs), and has done so twice—309 against Pakistan in Multan in 2004 and 319 against South Africa in Chennai in 2008. The latter is the fastest triple century in Test cricket, the 300 coming up off just 278 balls, and is also the highest score with a strike rate over 100. It was also rated as one of the top 10 Test innings of all time by the ICC rankings, and received special mention along with his 201* in Galle, in which he carried his bat as he was named the Wisden Leading Cricketer in the World in 2008. He is one of the only four batsmen to score two triple centuries, alongside Sir Donald Bradman, Brian Lara and Chris Gayle. He scored 12 centuries that have been converted to scores of 150 or greater, a record for the most consecutive hundreds of over 150. He has been dismissed five times in the nineties.

In ODIs, Sehwag has scored centuries against six opponents. His maiden century was made against New Zealand at the Sinhalese Sports Club, Colombo in 2001. He has scored a record five centuries in matches between them and India. One such century in Hamilton in 2009 was the fastest by an Indian, coming from 60 deliveries. Of these centuries, five were scored at home grounds and eight were at away (opposition's home) or neutral venues. His highest score of 219, the second highest ODI score for India was made against the West Indies at the Holkar Cricket Stadium in Indore. He has been dismissed five times in the nineties.

== Key ==
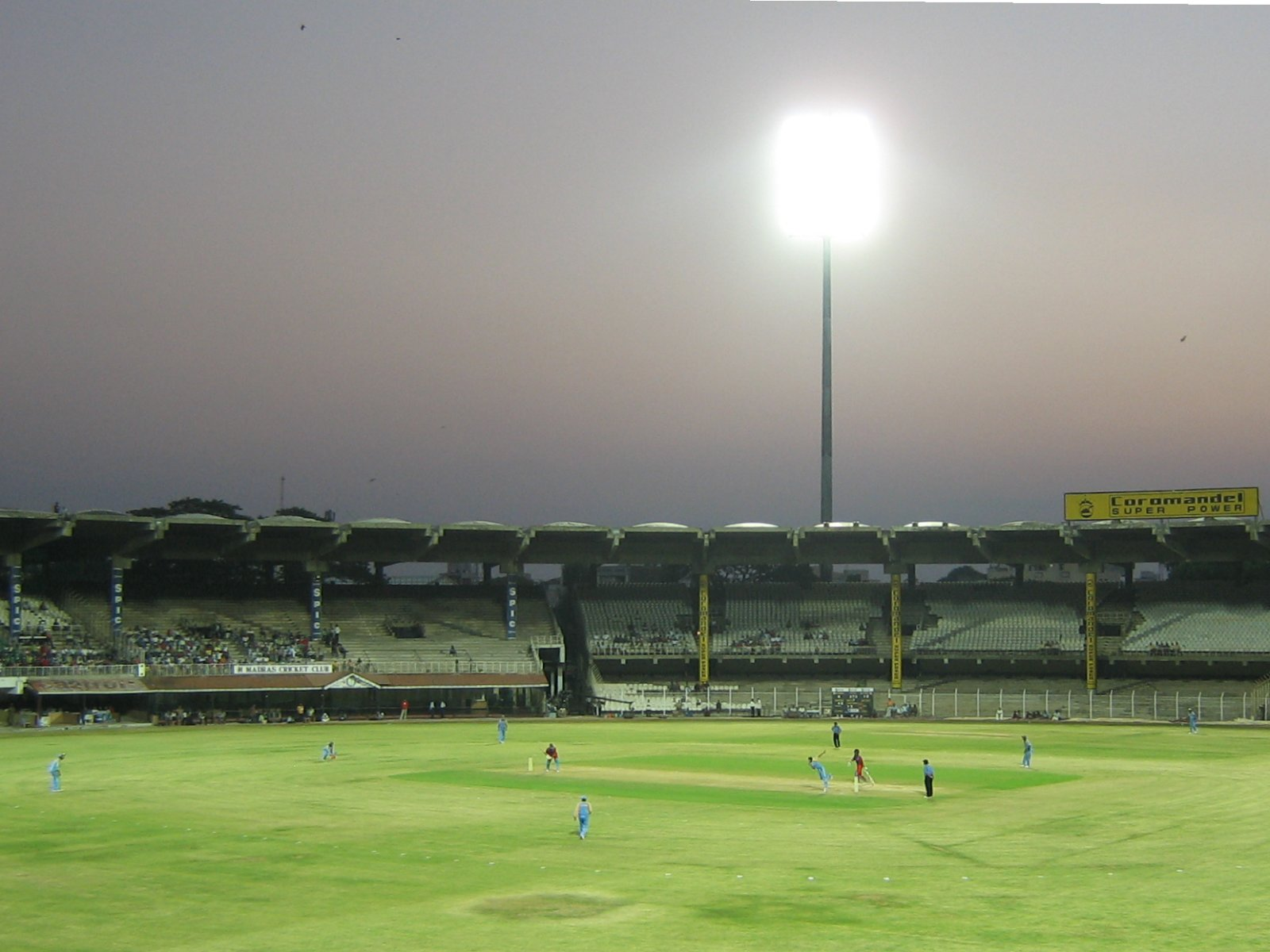
M. A. Chidambaram Stadium, Chennai, where Sehwag got his highest score, 319, versus South Africa

Key for centuries' lists
Symbol	Meaning
*	Remained not out
†	Man of the match
‡	Captained the Indian cricket team
Balls	Balls faced
Pos.	Position in the batting order
Inn.	The innings of the match
Test	The number of the Test match played in that series
S/R	Strike rate during the innings
H/A/N	Venue was at home (India), away or neutral
Date	Date the match was held, or the starting date of match for Test matches
Lost	The match was lost by India.
Won	The match was won by India.
Drawn	The match was drawn.

== Test centuries ==
Test cricket centuries scored by Virender Sehwag
No.	Score	Balls	Against	Pos.	Inn.	Test	S/R	Venue	H/A/N	Date	Result	Ref
1	105	173	South Africa	6	1	1/2	60.69	Springbok Park, Bloemfontein	Away	3 November 2001	Lost	
2	106	183	England	2	1	2/4	57.92	Trent Bridge, Nottingham	Away	8 August 2002	Drawn	
3	147 †	206	West Indies	2	1	1/3	71.35	Wankhede Stadium, Mumbai	Home	9 October 2002	Won	
4	130	225	New Zealand	2	2	2/2	57.77	Punjab Cricket Association Stadium, Mohali	Home	18 October 2003	Drawn	
5	195	233	Australia	2	1	3/4	83.69	Melbourne Cricket Ground, Melbourne	Away	26 December 2003	Lost	
6	309 †	375	Pakistan	2	1	1/3	82.40	Multan Cricket Stadium, Multan	Away	28 March 2004	Won	
7	155	221	Australia	2	2	2/4	70.13	M. A. Chidambaram Stadium, Chennai	Home	15 October 2004	Drawn	
8	164	228	South Africa	1	2	1/2	71.92	Green Park, Kanpur	Home	23 November 2004	Drawn	
9	173	244	Pakistan	2	2	1/3	70.90	Punjab Cricket Association Stadium, Mohali	Home	10 March 2005	Drawn	
10	201	262	Pakistan	2	2	3/3	76.71	M. Chinnaswamy Stadium, Bangalore	Home	26 March 2005	Lost	
11	254 †	247	Pakistan	1	2	1/3	102.83	Gaddafi Stadium, Lahore	Away	16 January 2006	Drawn	
12	180 †	190	West Indies	2	1	2/4	94.73	Beausejour Stadium, Gros Islet	Away	10 June 2006	Drawn	
13	151	236	Australia	1	3	4/4	63.98	Adelaide Oval, Adelaide	Away	28 January 2008	Drawn	
14	319 †	304	South Africa	2	2	1/3	104.93	M. A. Chidambaram Stadium, Chennai	Home	28 March 2008	Drawn	
15	201* †	231	Sri Lanka	2	1	2/3	87.01	Galle International Stadium, Galle	Away	31 July 2008	Won	
16	131	122	Sri Lanka	2	1	2/3	107.37	Green Park, Kanpur	Home	24 November 2009	Won	
17	293 †	254	Sri Lanka	2	1	3/3	115.35	Brabourne Stadium, Mumbai	Home	3 December 2009	Won	
18	109	139	South Africa	2	1	1/2	78.41	Vidarbha Cricket Association Stadium, Nagpur	Home	8 February 2010	Lost	
19	165	174	South Africa	2	1	2/2	94.82	Eden Gardens, Kolkata	Home	15 February 2010	Won	
20	109	118	Sri Lanka	2	2	1/3	92.37	Galle International Stadium, Galle	Away	20 July 2010	Lost	
21	109	105	Sri Lanka	2	2	3/3	103.80	Paikiasothy Saravanamuttu Stadium, Colombo	Away	5 August 2010	Won	
22	173	199	New Zealand	2	1	1/3	86.93	Sardar Patel Stadium, Motera, Ahmedabad	Home	4 November 2010	Drawn	
23	117	117	England	2	1	1/4	100.00	Sardar Patel Stadium, Motera, Ahmedabad	Home	15 November 2012	Won	

== ODI centuries ==
ODI cricket centuries scored by Virender Sehwag
No.	score	Balls	Against	Pos.	Inn.	S/R	Venue	H/A/N	Date	Result	Ref
1	100 †	70	New Zealand	2	2	142.85	Sinhalese Sports Club, Colombo	Neutral	2 August 2001	Won	
2	126 †	104	England	1	2	121.15	R. Premadasa Stadium, Colombo	Neutral	22 September 2002	Won	
3	114* †	82	West Indies	2	2	139.02	Madhavrao Scindia Cricket Ground, Rajkot	Home	12 November 2002	Won	
4	108 †	119	New Zealand	2	2	90.75	McLean Park, Napier	Away	29 December 2002	Lost	
5	112 †	139	New Zealand	2	2	80.57	Eden Park, Auckland	Away	11 January 2003	Won	
6	130 †	134	New Zealand	1	1	97.01	Lal Bahadur Shastri Stadium, Hyderabad	Home	15 November 2003	Won	
7	108 †	95	Pakistan	1	1	113.68	Nehru Stadium, Kochi	Home	2 April 2005	Won	
8	114 †	87	Bermuda	3	1	131.03	Queen's Park Oval, Port of Spain	Neutral	19 March 2007	Won	
9	119	95	Pakistan	2	2	125.26	National Stadium, Karachi	Away	26 June 2008	Won	
10	116	90	Sri Lanka	1	1	128.80	R. Premadasa Stadium, Colombo	Away	3 February 2009	Won	
11	125* †	74	New Zealand	2	2	168.91	Seddon Park, Hamilton	Away	11 March 2009	Won	
12	146 †	102	Sri Lanka	1	1	143.13	Madhavrao Scindia Cricket Ground, Rajkot	Home	15 December 2009	Won	
13	110 †	93	New Zealand	1	1	118.20	Rangiri Dambulla International Stadium, Dambulla	Neutral	25 August 2010	Won	
14	175 †	140	Bangladesh	1	1	125.00	Sher-e-Bangla Cricket Stadium, Dhaka	Away	19 February 2011	Won	
15	219 † ‡	149	West Indies	2	1	146.97	Holkar Cricket Stadium, Indore	Home	8 December 2011	Won	
