= Robin D'Souza =

Indian cricketer (born 1980)

Personal information
- Full name: Robin Tito D'Souza
- Born: 2 May 1980 (age 46); Dubai, United Arab Emirates
- Source: ESPNcricinfo, 22 November 2016

Robin D'Souza (born 2 May 1980) is an Indian first-class cricketer who plays for Goa. He made his first-class debut for Goa in the 2002.
