= Pre-Portuguese Christianity in Goa =

Christianity in Goa has pre-Portuguese roots, according to a few scholars such as H.O. Mascarenhas and Jose Cosme Costa. These roots are probably the same as those of the Saint Thomas Christians or Nasranis of Kerala.

== The work of H.O. Mascarenhas ==
H.O. Mascarenhas proposed the theory of pre-Portuguese Christianity in Goa. In an interview, Mascarenhas reports hearing from his grandmother about pre-Portuguese Christianity in Goa. His grandmother was from Aldona, Goa, where the parish church is dedicated to St. Thomas. She spoke of the equal-armed crosses (still found all over Goa today) without the image of Jesus which is common among Saint Thomas Christians. Mascarenhas himself recalls that the Hindus in Goa used to celebrate 3 July (the feast of Thomas the Apostle) as Dukrana, which he later realized as somehow similar to the Syriac 'Dukrana' which is the feast of the martyrdom of Thomas. He also reports the existence of Christian and Hindu 'Thomses' in Kalyanpuram near Mangalore, probably people who fled or migrated from Goa. Again, in a letter from Goa dated 20 September 1542, four months after his arrival, Francis Xavier writes that the people of the land were greatly devoted to St. Thomas. According to Mascarenhas, this could not have come from the Portuguese, who had no great devotion to Thomas the Apostle. Yet another argument is that Francis Xavier suggests that the Pope be petitioned for a plenary indulgence for the feast of St. Thomas. However, at that time the Latin church celebrated the feast of St. Thomas on 21 December and not on 3 July, which was the date on which Syrian Christians celebrated the feast. Mascarenhas suggests therefore that Francis Xavier had witnessed the celebration of the feast on 3 July; he could not have witnessed a celebration on 21 December, since he had just arrived in Goa in May 1542.

Jose Cosme Costa reports that Mascarenhas even proposed that there were Christian temples dedicated to the persons of the Trinity: Abanath / Bhutnath (Father Lord), Ravalnath (from Rabboni - Rabulna - Rabulnath) / Bhai rav (Brother Lord), and Atman / Bhavka Devta, Santeri, Ajadevi (Spirit).

== The work of Cosme Jose Costa ==
An archaeological discovery (on 27 April 2001 by Jose Cosme Costa, SFX) of a 'Thomas Cross' hidden in a smallish monument, surmounted by a Latin Cross, near the old Goa harbour (now on the Zuari river, near Agaçaim) lends support to this thesis. Cosme Jose Costa, historian at Pilar, Goa, has dedicated a recent work to the implications of this discovery: Apostolic Christianity in Goa and in the West Coast. The Cross bears an inscription in Pahlavi, which, Costa reports, was the liturgical language of the church associated with the Metropolitan of Fars.

Cosme Costa speaks of Goa as a trading centre with the Middle East and with Rome. He speaks of the Apostle Thomas making his way over land to Kerala - and it is not implausible that he passed through Goa and the Konkan coast. He also examines the evidence of the Apostle Bartholomew having done more or less the same thing. Cosme Costa's book contains a ch. 6 dedicated to the examination of Pre-Portuguese references to Christianity in Goa. Ch. 7 examines the vestiges of Pre-Portuguese Christian Customs in Goa and the Konkan. Costa also suggests that the 'Betal' worshipped quite commonly in Goa is a corruption of 'Bartholomew'. Ch. 8, finally, is dedicated to the discovery of the 'Thomas Cross' hidden in a smallish monument, surmounted by a Latin Cross, near the old Goa harbour. A storm seems to have split open the structure, revealing the Thomas Cross within.

What then happened to this early Christianity, if it did exist? Costa proposes that the Portuguese destroyed the vestiges and forcibly assimilated these Christians to their own (Latin) form of Christianity. Those who resisted were among those who fled Goa.

== Evidence ==
1. The metallic crucifix found in a wall of a house at Old Goa by Afonso de Albuquerque, a few days after the conquest of Tiswadi in November 1510. A road was later named after this crucifix — “Rua de Crucifixo”. #The document of a gift (doacao) on a metallic plate given to a “pagoda” of Goa Velha by a Hindu king in 1391 which speaks of trinity and divine incarnation, and later produced in the court of the city of Old Goa in 1532.
2. Ibn Batuta's testimony that in 1342 AD, he found Christian settlements on the banks of the River Agashini (river Zuari).
3. The Saint Thomas Cross with Pahlavi inscription found by Fr J. Cosme Costa on the banks of the river Zuari.
4. An article in the Examiner (Bombay) on Pre-Portuguese Christianity which speaks of Thomas crosses on the Hill of Colvale (Bardez) which people would hide in olden days, fearing their destruction by the Portuguese. (This article is probably the same as the interview given by H.O. Mascarenhas, mentioned above.)

== Literature ==
- Mascarenhas, H.O. Konkannachem Apostolik Kristanvponn. Dabul, Bombay: Betal Prakashan, 1960.
- Mascarenhas, H.O. Interview with the Editor of New Leader. 28 June 1970 and 5 July 1970. Reprinted in the Silver Jubilee Souvenir of the Archdiocese of Tellicherry, 1970: see https://web.archive.org/web/20111004230653/http://thenazrani.org/feasts9.htm.
- Mascarenhas, H.O. [Series of articles] The Examiner [Weekly Organ of the Archdiocese of Bombay]. 20 December 1952 to 18 April 1953.
- Costa, Cosme Jose. Apostolic Christianity in Goa and in the West Coast. Pilar, Goa: Xavierian Publication Society, 2009.
- Rebello, Eremito. “Christian Presence in Goa and the Diocese of Goa.” Lecture at the National Seminar on Christianity: A project of History of Indian Science, Philosophy and Culture, New Delhi, organised at the International Centre, Dona Paula, Goa, January 2003. See report at.
- "Analogical review on Saint Thomas Cross - The symbol of Nasranis - Interpretation of the Inscriptions," at http://nasrani.net/2008/02/29/analogical-review-on-st-thomas-cross-the-symbol-of-nasranis/.
- Jornada of Dom Alexis de Menezes: A Portuguese account of the Sixteenth century Malabar. Ed. Pius Malekandathil. LRC Publications, 2003.
- Malekandathil, Pius. "St. Thomas Christians and the Indian Ocean AD 52 to AD 1500,” Ephrem's Theological Journal 5/2 (2001).
- Malekandathil, Pius. Maritime India: trade, religion and polity in the Indian Ocean. Primus Books, 2010.
- Stewart, John. Nestorian Missionary Enterprise: The Story of a Church on Fire. Gorgias Press LLC, 2007.

== See also ==
- Christianity in Kerala
- Christianity in China
- Christianity in Sri Lanka
- Christianity in Pakistan
- Xi'an Stele
