= Rajashekhar Harikant =

Indian cricketer (born 1990)

Personal information
- Full name: Rajashekhar Surendra Harikant
- Born: 4 October 1990 (age 36); Kumta, Karnataka, India
- Batting: Right-handed
- Source: Cricinfo, 14 December 2018

Rajashekhar Harikant (born 4 October 1990) is an Indian cricketer. He made his first-class debut for Goa in the 2018–19 Ranji Trophy on 14 December 2018. He made a Ranji Trophy comeback as a concussion substitute for Samar Dubashi on 8 November 2025 scoring a gritty 40 off 43 balls
