= Dr Rajendra Prasad Stadium =

Sports venue in Margao, Goa, India

- Interactive map of Dr Rajendra Prasad Stadium
- Location: Margao, Goa
- Coordinates: 15.2669°N 73.9641°E
- Capacity: 5,000 (cricket)
- Surface: Grass

Construction
- Opened: 1954

Tenant
- Goa cricket team

Dr Rajendra Prasad Stadium is situated in Margao, Goa, India. It is the home ground of the Goa cricket team. It has a capacity of 5,000 people and was opened in 1954.

== Matches ==
1. Goa vs Jammu Kashmir. (Details)
2. Goa vs Jharkhand. (Details)
3. Goa vs Himachal Pradesh. (Details)
4. Goa vs Maharashtra.
5. Goa vs Rajasthan. (Details)
6. Goa vs Assam. (Details)
