= Hubert Olympus Mascarenhas =

Indian catholic priest (1905–1973)

- Born: c. 1905; Porvorim, Goa, Portuguese India, Portuguese Empire (now in India)
- Died: 9 February 1973 (aged 67–68); Bombay, (now Mumbai), Maharashtra, India

Hubert Olympus Mascarenhas (1905 in Porvorim, Goa – 9 February 1973 at Mumbai), was a Catholic priest belonging to the Archdiocese of Bombay, indologist of repute, and nationalist.

== Early life and education ==
Mascarenhas did his early ecclesiastical studies at the Pontifical Seminary in Kandy, Sri Lanka. In Rome, at the University of the Propaganda Fide, he took a licentiate in Canon Law as well as PhD. He was ordained in Rome in 1934, at the age of 29. Returning to Mumbai, he obtained an M.A. in English, an M.A. in Sanskrit, and a PhD in history at the University of Bombay.

== Career ==
=== Teaching ===
Mascarenhas was appointed post-graduate teacher of Ancient Indian History and Culture at the University of Bombay, and Professor of Indian Philosophy for M.A. students at the St Xavier's College, Mumbai. His "The Quintessence of Hinduism: The Key to Indian Culture and Philosophy" was widely acclaimed. He is one of Richard De Smet's predecessors in a 'realist' interpretation of Sankara. For almost 12 years (late 1940s and early 1950s) he also served as Principal of St Sebastian Goan High School, Dabul.

=== Scholarly work ===
He proposed a theory of pre-Portuguese Christianity in Goa. Jose Cosme Costa reports that Mascarenhas even proposed that there were Christian temples dedicated to the persons of the Trinity: Abanath / Bhutnath (Father Lord), Ravalnath (from Rabboni – Rabulna – Rabulnath) / Bhai rav (Brother Lord), and Atman / Bhavka Devta, Santeri, Ajadevi (Spirit). A recent archaeological discovery of a Thomas Cross hidden in a smallish monument, surmounted by a Latin Cross, near the old Goa harbour lends support to this thesis. The Cross bears an inscription in Pahlavi, which, Costa reports, was the liturgical language of the church associated with the Metropolitan of Fars (Persia).

He also participated in the Konkani movement in Mumbai, and did work for the Konkani Bhasha Mandal.

=== Nationalism ===
As an indologist and a linguist, Mascarenhas attracted the attention of nationalist leaders such as Jawaharlal Nehru, Kaka Kalelkar and S.S. Mulgaonkar. His patriotism and espousal of Indian nationalism brought him into conflict with the ecclesiastical authorities.

== Bibliography ==
=== Primary ===
- The Quintessence of Hinduism: The Key to Indian Culture and Philosophy. Bombay: St Sebastian Goan High School, 1951.
- Konkannachem Apostolik Kristanvponn. Rendered into Kannada script by A.A. Saldanha. Dabul, Bombay: Betal Prakashan, 1960.
- Interview with the Editor of New Leader, reprinted in the Silver Jubilee Souvenir of the Archdiocese of Tellicherry, 1970

=== Secondary ===
- De Smet, Richard. "Sankara Vedanta and Christian Theology," Review of Darshana 1/1 (1980) 33-48 = Understanding Sankara: Essays by Richard De Smet (New Delhi: Motilal Banarsidass, forthcoming) ch. 27.
- Costa, Cosme Jose. Apostolic Christianity in Goa and in the West Coast. Pilar, Goa: Xavierian Publication Society, 2009.
