= Aman Mokhade =

Indian cricketer (born 2001)

Personal information
- Full name: Aman Ravindra Mokhade
- Born: 16 January 2001 (age 25); Nagpur, Maharashtra, India
- Batting: Right-handed
- Bowling: Right-arm legbreak
- Role: Top-order batter

Domestic team information
- Years: Team
- 2023/24–present: Vidarbha

Career statistics
Competition	FC	LA	T20
Matches	13	17	14
Runs scored	8,70	1013	306
Batting average	39.54	67.53	27.81
100s/50s	3/3	5/3	0/3
Top score	183	150*	73*
Balls bowled	36	18	24
Wickets	1	0	0
Bowling average	18.00	-	–
5 wickets in innings	0	0	0
10 wickets in match	0	0	0
Best bowling	1/17	-	–
Catches/stumpings	14/–	8/–	8/–
- Source: ESPNcricinfo, 16 January 2026

Aman Mokhade (born 16 January 2001) is an Indian cricketer. In December 2022, he made his first-class debut against Jammu & Kashmir. He made his List A debut for Vidarbha, against Meghalaya, in the Vijay Hazare Trophy on 23 November 2023. He made his Twenty20 debut on 11 October 2022, for Vidarbha in the Syed Mushtaq Ali Trophy against Assam.

In the 2025–26 Vijay Hazare Trophy equalled the record for the quickest to reach 1000 runs in List A cricket.
