= Railway Stadium, Vasco da Gama =

Cricket ground in India

Coordinates: 15.396249901714373°N 73.81187226255076°E

Railway Stadium
Ground information
- Location: Vasco da Gama, India
- Establishment: 1985 (first recorded match)

Team information
Goa	(1985–present)
- As of 29 October 2011; Source: Ground profile

Railway Stadium is a cricket ground in Vasco da Gama, Goa, India. The only recorded match held on the ground was a first-class match between Goa played Kerala in the 1986/87 Ranji Trophy, which Kerala won by 6 wickets.
