= Mall De Goa =

Shopping mall in Goa, India

- Location: Porvorim, Goa, India
- Coordinates: 15.5256717°N 73.8271165°E
- Address: NH 17
- Opened: 27 February 2016; 10 years ago
- Developer: Jai Bhuvan Builders Private Limited
- Owner: Jai Bhuvan Group
- Num. of stores: 82
- Floor area: 180,000 sq ft (17,000 m^{2})
- Floors: 3
- Parking: 300 cars 350 two wheelers
- Website: malldegoa.com

Mall De Goa is a shopping mall in Porvorim in the Indian state of Goa. It is the largest shopping mall in Goa and was the second mall in the state after Caculo Mall in the capital Panaji. The mall was opened on 27 February 2016. It contains more than 82 retail outlets including food courts, restaurants, family entertainment zones and an INOX multiplex.

The property is owned by Jai Bhuvan Group. The estimated cost for this project is nearly ₹100 crore (equivalent to ₹157 crore or US$16 million in 2026). Mall De Goa was inaugurated at the hands of former Defence Minister and Chief Minister of Goa Manohar Parrikar on 27 February 2016. The mall is spread across 1,80,000 square feet. On 4 February 2017, DJ Aneesh Gera launched the 'Offersky App' on the Google Play Store which would enable the people to browse through different offers and other activities ongoing in the mall.

== Malls in Goa ==
Specifically there are two malls in Goa, Mall De Goa and Caculo Mall.

== Location ==
Mall De Goa is located right on the NH17 highway in Porvorim. Its strategic location makes it easily accessible from any part of the city and its suburbs. This mall has now become a hallmark of Porvorim.

== Features ==
- 300 car and 350 two-wheeler parking on two levels
- 400 seater food court with seven counters
- Four screen INOX multiplex with capacity of 1000 seats
- Children's gaming centre
- Climate controlled commercial spaces
- Artificial turf Futsal court

== Retail ==
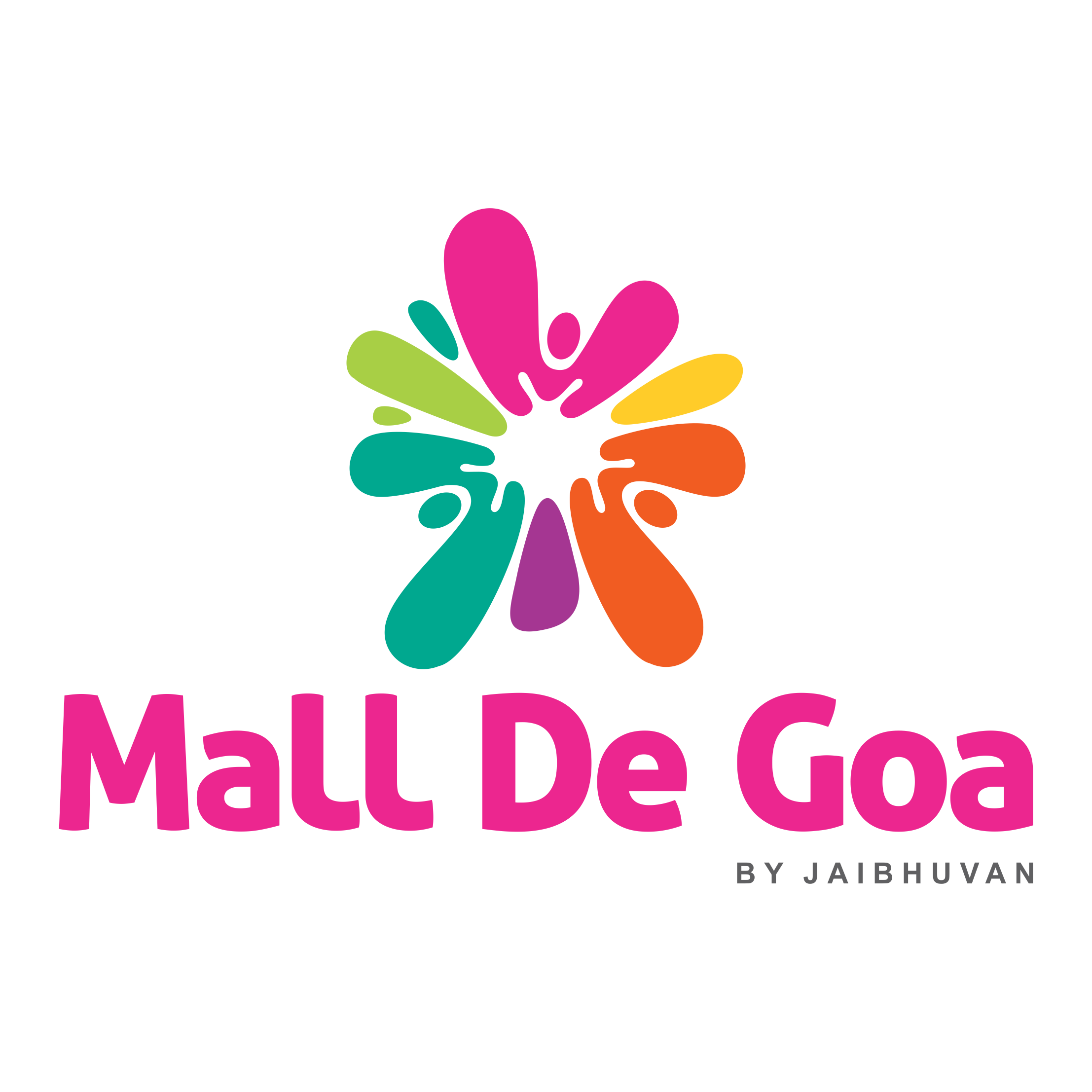
Mall De Goa Logo

Mall De Goa houses 82 retail stores with a mix of international and national premium brands such as Kompanero, Marks and Spencer, IFB, Nike, Puma, Louis Philippe, Shoppers Stop, Tommy Hilfiger, Calvin Klein, United Colors Of Benetton, U.S. Polo Assn. and many more.

== See also ==
- List of shopping malls in India
