= Deepraj Gaonkar =

Indian cricketer (born 1998)

Personal information
- Full name: Deepraj Devdas Gaonkar
- Born: 4 April 1998 (age 28)
- Source: ESPNcricinfo, 30 January 2017

Deepraj Gaonkar (born 4 April 1998) is an Indian cricketer. He made his first-class debut for Goa in the 2014–15 Ranji Trophy on 28 December 2014. He made his List A debut for Goa in 2018-19 Vijay Hazare Trophy on 19 September 2018.
