= Shabbir Khan =

Indian cricketer (born 1997)

Personal information
- Full name: Shabbir Bashir Khan
- Born: 31 March 1997 (age 29)
- Batting: Right-handed
- Bowling: Right arm fast

Domestic team information
- Years: Team
- 2020–present: Bihar
- Source: Cricinfo, 3 January 2020

Shabbir Khan (born 31 March 1997) is an Indian cricketer. He made his first-class debut on 3 January 2020, for Bihar in the 2019–20 Ranji Trophy. He made his List A debut on 20 February 2021, for Bihar in the 2020–21 Vijay Hazare Trophy.
