= Supriyo Chakraborty =

Indian cricketer (born 1995)

Personal information
- Born: 9 May 1995 (age 31)
- Source: Cricinfo, 8 March 2019

Supriyo Chakraborty (born 9 May 1995) is an Indian cricketer. He made his Twenty20 debut for Jharkhand in the 2018–19 Syed Mushtaq Ali Trophy on 8 March 2019.
