= Shubham Desai =

Indian cricketer (born 1996)

Personal information
- Born: 28 February 1996 (age 30)
- Source: Cricinfo, 29 September 2019

Shubham Desai (born 28 February 1996) is an Indian cricketer. He made his List A debut on 29 September 2019, for Goa in the 2019–20 Vijay Hazare Trophy. He made his Twenty20 debut on 8 November 2019, for Goa in the 2019–20 Syed Mushtaq Ali Trophy.
