= Goa Cricket Association Academy Ground =

Cricket ground

Coordinates: 15°31′26.64″N 73°49′47.27″E

- Interactive map of Goa Cricket Association Academy Ground

Ground information
- Location: Porvorim, India
- Country: India
- Establishment: 2008 (first recorded match)

Team information
Goa	(2010)
- As of 29 October 2011; Source: Goa Cricket Association Academy Ground Ground profile

The Goa Cricket Association Academy Ground, formerly known as the District Institute of Education and Training Ground, is a cricket ground in Porvorim, Goa, India. The first recorded match held on the ground came in November 2008 when Goa Under-16s played Kerala Under-16s. Two first-class matches have been played at the ground, the first of which came in the 2011-11 Ranji Trophy. The first saw Goa play Jharkhand, while the second saw Tripura as the visitors. The Goa Cricket Academy is based at the ground.
