= Ishaan Gadekar =

Indian cricketer (born 1997)

Personal information
- Full name: Ishaan Prasad Gadekar
- Born: 31 August 1997 (age 29); Mandrem, Goa, India
- Source: ESPNcricinfo, 20 February 2021

Ishaan Gadekar (born 31 August 1997) is an Indian cricketer. He made his List A debut on 20 February 2021, for Goa in the 2020–21 Vijay Hazare Trophy. He made his Twenty20 debut on 4 November 2021, for Goa in the 2021–22 Syed Mushtaq Ali Trophy.
