= Yash Kothari =

Indian cricketer (born 1995)

Personal information
- Born: 6 October 1995 (age 31); Bhilwara, Rajasthan, India
- Batting: Right-handed
- Bowling: Left-arm orthodox
- Role: Batting all-rounder
- Source: Cricinfo, 8 February 2018

Yash Kothari (born 6 October 1995) is an Indian cricketer and plays for Rajasthan in domestic cricket.

He made his List A debut for Rajasthan in the 2017–18 Vijay Hazare Trophy on 8 February 2018. He made his first-class debut on 3 January 2020, for Rajasthan in the 2019–20 Ranji Trophy. He made his Twenty20 debut on 4 November 2021, for Rajasthan in the 2021–22 Syed Mushtaq Ali Trophy. He made his Twenty20 debut on 8 November 2021, for Rajasthan in the 2021–22 Syed Mushtaq Ali Trophy.
