= Karan Lamba =

Indian cricketer (born 2004)

Personal information
- Full name: Karan Rajesh Lamba
- Born: 28 November 2004 (age 21)
- Batting: Right-handed
- Role: Middle-order batsman

Domestic team information
- Years: Team
- 2023–present: Rajasthan

Career statistics
| Competition | FC | LA | T20 |
|---|---|---|---|
| Matches | 12 | 14 | 3 |
| Runs scored | 862 | 675 | 84 |
| Batting average | 61.57 | 67.50 | 28.00 |
| 100s/50s | 4/1 | 3/4 | 0/1 |
| Top score | 194 | 119* | 52 |
| Catches/stumpings | 4/ | 12/ | 3/- |
- Source: cricinfo, 30 October 2026

Karan Rajesh Lamba (born 28 November 2004) is an Indian cricketer, who plays as a middle order batter. He plays for Rajasthan in domestic cricket

Lamba made his first-class debut on 03 January 2023 in the 2022–23 Ranji Trophy and his List A debut on 27 November 2023 in the 2022–23 Vijay Hazare Trophy.
