= Goa cricket team =

Indian cricket team

Personnel
- Captain: Abhinav Tejrana (FC); Suyash Prabhudessai (LA); Abhinav Tejrana (T20)
- Coach: Dinesh Mongia
- Owner: Goa Cricket Association

Team information
- Founded: 1985
- Home ground: Dr. Rajendra Prasad Stadium, Margao
- Capacity: 5,000
- Secondary home ground(s): Goa Cricket Association Academy Ground, Porvorim

History
- First-class debut: Kerala in 1985 at Railway Stadium, Vasco da Gama
- Ranji Trophy wins: 0
- Irani Trophy wins: 0
- Vijay Hazare Trophy wins: 0
- Syed Mushtaq Ali Trophy wins: 0

The Goa cricket team is first-class cricket team based in Goa, India, has competed in the Ranji Trophy since the 1985–86 season.

== Playing history ==
Goa lost all five matches in their first season, and did not win until 1996–97, in their 56th match, when they defeated Karnataka by an innings.

Goa's best ever performance came in the 2013–14 Syed Mushtaq Ali Trophy where they finished 3rd. They missed out on the finals due to Net Run Rate. Goa fell short by roughly two balls. Needing to chase the total in 14.4 overs to lift their net run rate, they needed 4 runs to win after 14.3 overs. Goa lost wickets in the next two deliveries and scored a four by 14.6 overs. Goa captain Swapnil Asnodkar and Sagun Kamat were the second and third highest run scorers of the tournament respectively. Harshad Gadekar finished as the second highest wicket taker of the tournament.

== Venues ==
Goa's home grounds are the Dr. Rajendra Prasad Stadium, Margao, and the Goa Cricket Association Academy Ground, Porvorim.

=== International venues ===
Name	City	State	First used	Last used	F/C	LA	T20	Notes
Fatorda Stadium	Margao	Goa	1989	2010	1	10	0	Hosted nine ODIs.

=== Domestic venues ===
Name	City	State	First used	Last used	F/C	LA	T20	Notes
Arlem Breweries Ground	Margao	Goa	1986	2005	12	9	0	
Dr. Rajendra Prasad Stadium	Margao	Goa	1968	2013	21	14	0	
Bhausaheb Bandodkar Ground	Panaji	Goa	1986	2006	26	16	0	
Goa Cricket Association Academy Ground	Porvorim	Goa	2010	2015	15	5	0	
Railway Stadium (Vasco da Gama)	Vasco da Gama	Goa	1985	1985	1	0	0	

== Notable Players ==
- Arun Shetty (1990-1995)
- Vivek Kolambkar (1996-2006)
- Shadab Jakati (1998-2018)
- Sagun Kamat (1999-2019)
- Swapnil Asnodkar (2001-2018)
- Robin D'Souza (2002-2015)
- Saurabh Bandekar (2004-2017)
- Amit Yadav (2007-2022)
- Darshan Misal (2011-present)
- Amogh Desai (2012-2024)
- Lakshay Garg (2014-2024)
- Snehal Kauthankar (2015-present)
- Suyash Prabhudessai (2017-present)

== Current squad ==
Name	Birth date	Batting style	Bowling style	Notes
Batsmen
Suyash Prabhudessai	6 December 1997 (age 28)	Right-handed		List A Captain
Abhinav Tejrana	17 December 2000 (age 25)	Left-handed	Right-arm off break	First-class and Twenty20 Captain
Snehal Kauthankar	19 October 1995 (age 31)	Right-handed	Right-arm off break	
Kashyap Bakhale	6 August 1998 (age 28)	Right-handed	Right-arm leg break	
Manthan Khutkar	2 May 1999 (age 27)	Left-handed	Right-arm medium	
Ishaan Gadekar	31 August 1997 (age 29)	Left-handed	Right-arm leg break	
Yash Kasvankar		Left-handed	Right-arm off break	
Azaan Thota	12 January 2002 (age 24)	Left-handed	Right-arm off break	
All-rounders
Lalit Yadav	3 January 1997 (age 29)	Right-handed	Right-arm off break	
Darshan Misal	11 September 1992 (age 34)	Left-handed	Slow left-arm orthodox	
Deepraj Gaonkar	4 April 1998 (age 28)	Right-handed	Right-arm medium	
Vikas Singh	18 October 1999 (age 27)	Left-handed	Right-arm off break	
Amulya Pandrekar	31 March 1996 (age 30)	Left-handed	Slow left-arm orthodox	
Wicket-keepers
Rajashekhar Harikant	4 October 1990 (age 36)	Right-handed		
Shivendra Bhujbal	1 March 2003 (age 23)	Right-handed		
Spin Bowlers
Mohit Redkar	27 September 2000 (age 26)	Right-handed	Right-arm off break	
Shubham Desai	28 February 1996 (age 30)	Right-handed	Right-arm off break	
Fast Bowlers
Vasuki Koushik	19 September 1992 (age 34)	Right-handed	Right-arm medium	
Arjun Tendulkar	24 September 1999 (age 27)	Left-handed	Left-arm medium-fast	Plays for Lucknow Super Giants in IPL
Shubham Tari	1 June 2001 (age 25)	Right-handed	Right-arm medium	
Heramb Parab	4 September 1998 (age 28)	Right-handed	Right-arm medium-fast	
Samit Mishra	25 November 1999 (age 26)	Right-handed	Left-arm medium	
Ruthvik Naik	16 May 2001 (age 25)	Right-handed	Right-arm medium	
Felix Alemao	20 June 1995 (age 31)	Right-handed	Right-arm medium	

Updated as on 14 November 2026

== Coaching staff ==
- Head Coach – Prakash Mayekar
- Under-19s Coach – Vinod Dhamasker
- Ranji Physio – Danny Pereira
- Ranji Trainers – Prabhakar Bairgond
