= Nikin Jose =

Indian cricketer (born 2000)

Personal information
- Born: 21 August 2000 (age 26); Mysore, Karnataka, India
- Batting: Right-handed
- Bowling: Right-arm off-spin
- Role: Batsman

Domestic team information
- Years: Team
- 2022–: Karnataka
- Source: ESPNcricinfo, 7 July 2023

Nikin Jose (born 21 August 2000) is an Indian cricketer who plays for Karnataka in domestic cricket. He made his first-class debut against Services in the 2022-23 Ranji Trophy on 13 December 2022 and made his List A debut on 12 November 2022, against Meghalaya in 2022–23 Vijay Hazare Trophy. In July 2023, he was called up into India A squad for 2023 ACC Emerging Teams Asia Cup.

== Career ==
Nikin made his U-16 & U-19 domestic cricket debut as opening batsman for Karnataka in 2014. Jose at an age of 15 years and 25 days, became the youngest player to feature in the Karnataka Premier League. He played for Mysuru Warriors on 17 September 2015 against Rockstars.
