= Snehal Kauthankar =

Indian cricketer (born 1995)

Personal information
- Full name: Snehal Suhas Kauthankar
- Born: 19 October 1995 (age 31)
- Batting: Right handed
- Bowling: Right arm Offbreak
- Role: Top-order batter

Domestic team information
- Years: Team
- 2015–present: Goa

Career statistics
Competition	FC	LA	T20
Matches	59	54	29
Runs scored	4,127	1,851	481
Batting average	47.98	35.59	20.04
100s/50s	10/14	4/11	0/2
Top score	314*	148*	57
Catches/stumpings	48/–	11/–	7/–
- Source: Cricinfo, 13 April 2025

Snehal Kauthankar (born 19 October 1995) is an Indian cricketer who plays for Goa. He made his Twenty20 debut on 3 January 2016 in the 2015–16 Syed Mushtaq Ali Trophy. He made his List A debut for Goa in the 2016–17 Vijay Hazare Trophy on 25 February 2017.

He was the leading run-scorer for Goa in the 2018–19 Vijay Hazare Trophy, with 270 runs in six matches.
