= Motera =

Motera Motera, Ahmedabad
- Area in Northwest Ahmedabad
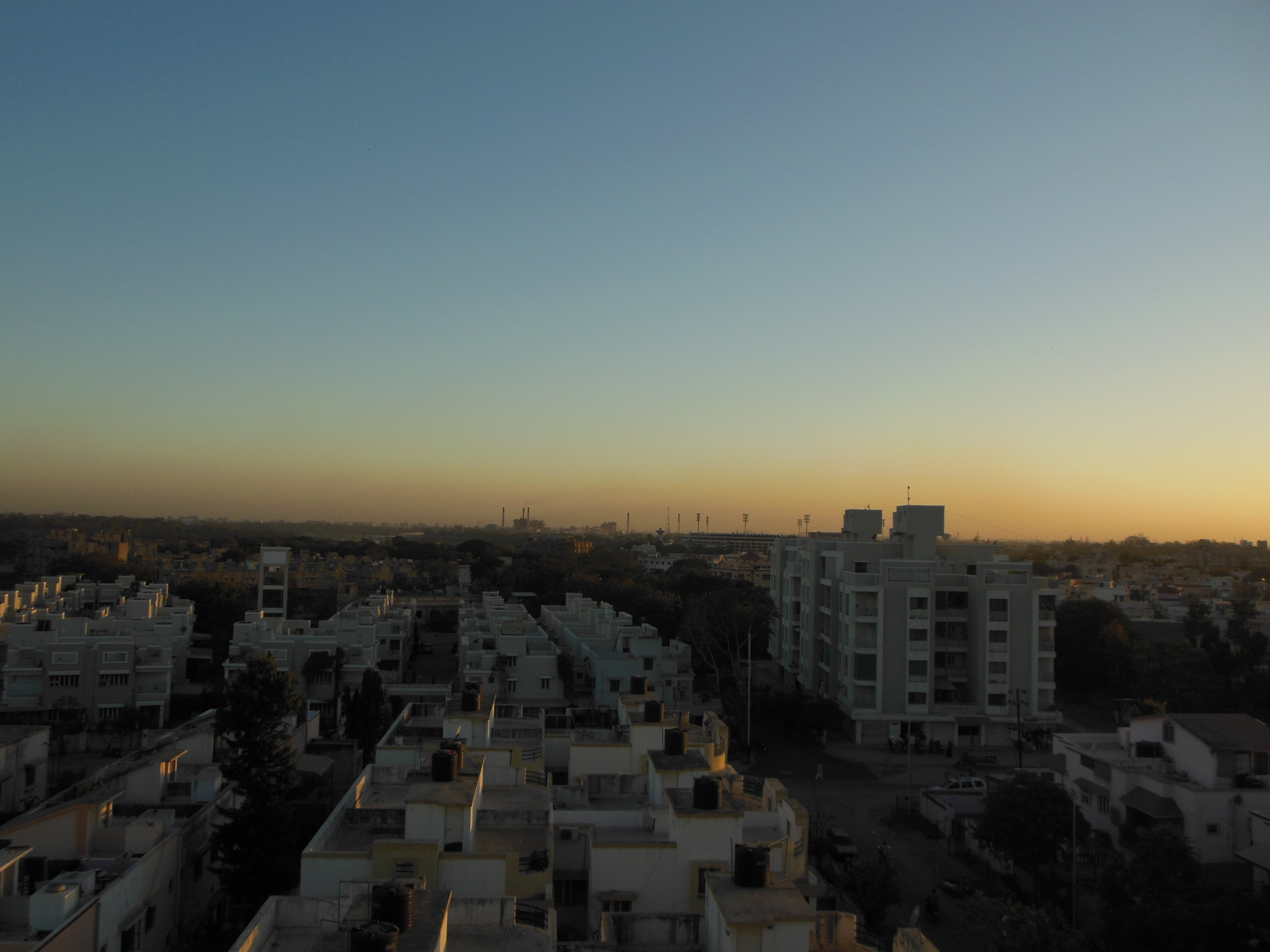
- Motera at dusk, as seen southward in 2013

- Location in Ahmedabad, Gujarat, India Motera (Gujarat) Motera (India)
- Coordinates: 23°5′39″N 72°35′46″E
- Country: India
- State: Gujarat
- District: Ahmedabad
- Named for: Motera village

Government
  - Type: Civic authority
  - Body: Ahmedabad Municipal Corporation

Population (2001)
  - Total: 21,150

Languages
  - Official: Gujarati, Hindi, English
- Time zone: UTC+5:30 (IST)
- Postal code: 380 005
- Vehicle registration: GJ 01
- Website: gujaratindia.com

Motera is a neighbourhood in the northwestern part of the metropolis of Ahmedabad in Gujarat, India. It lies west of the Sabarmati River. It falls under the West Zone of Ahmedabad Municipal Corporation and under the Gandhinagar South constituency of Gujarat Legislative Assembly (Vidhan Sabha) and under the Gandhinagar constituency of the Lok Sabha. The chief attraction in Motera is the world's largest sports stadium, Narendra Modi Stadium. The stadium is the venue for the international cricket matches held in Ahmedabad. In 2015, the old stadium was demolished and the new stadium was built, becoming the world's largest stadium.

== History ==
It was earlier a part of the Gandhinagar district. January 2008 onwards, it is in the limits of Ahmedabad Municipal Corporation (AMC) in the Daskroi Taluka. It is included in the West Zone as per AMC, though it is the northernmost and the closest to the twin city and the capital of the Gujarat state, Gandhinagar. Motera is on the opposite bank of Sabarmati River.

== Demographics ==
As of 2001 India census, Motera had a population of 21,150. Males constitute 55% of the population and females 45%. Motera has an average literacy rate of 74%, higher than the national average of 59.5%: male literacy is 81%, and female literacy is 67%. In Motera, 13% of the population is under 6 years of age.

== Gallery ==
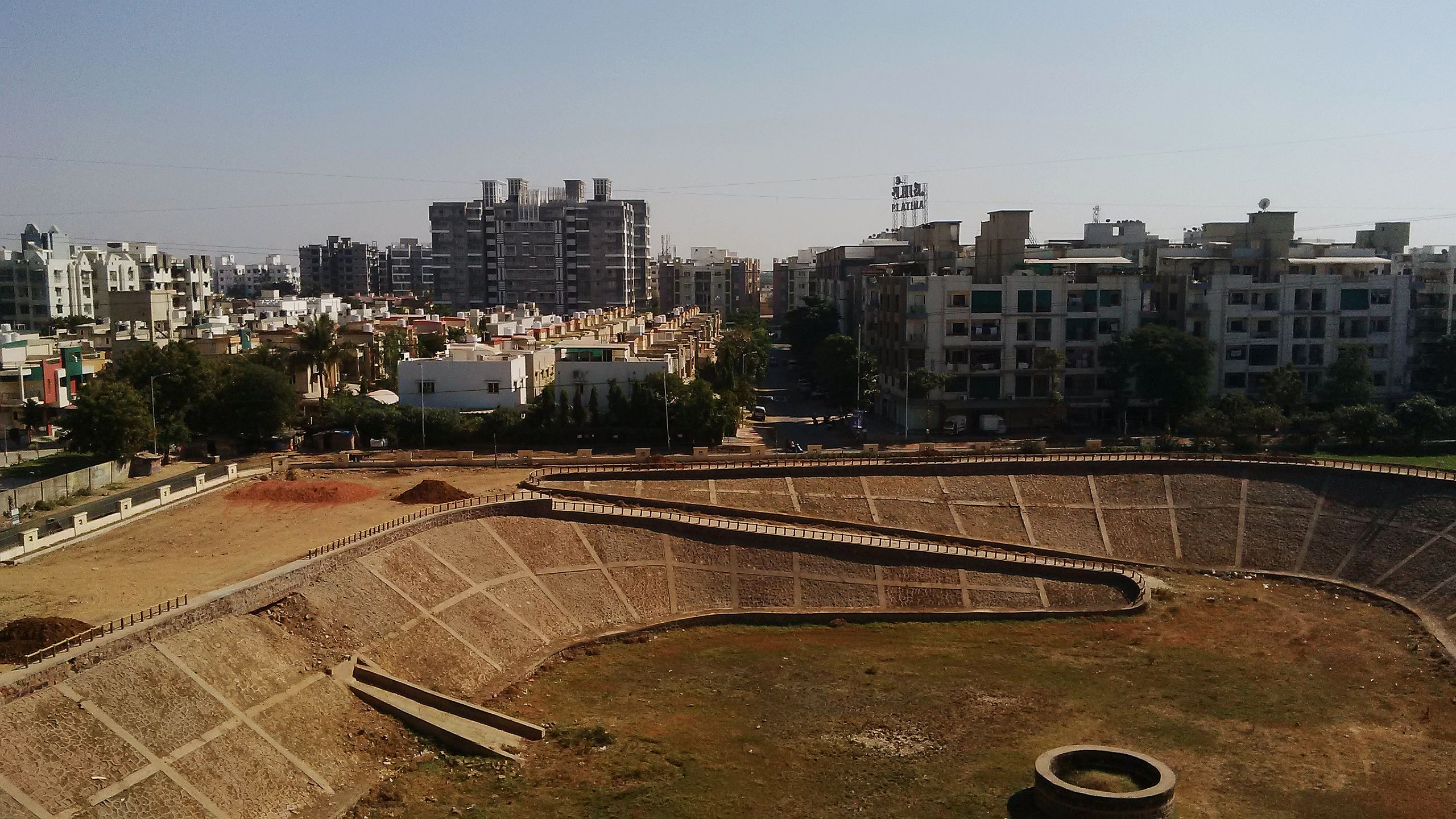
Motera lake, Behind 4D Mall, Motera, Ahmedabad

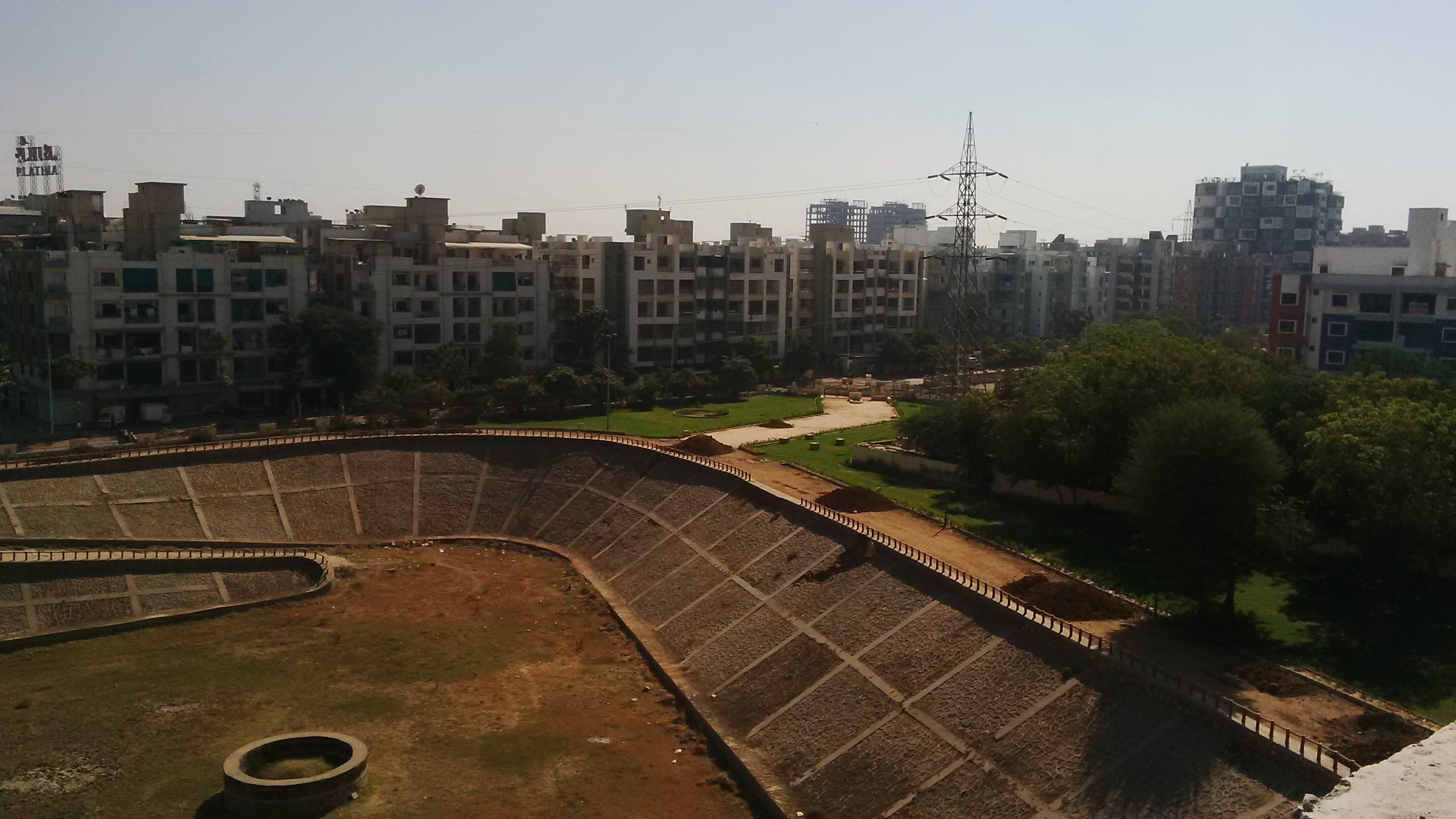
Motera lake, Behind 4D Mall, Motera, Ahmedabad
