= Gujarat College Ground =

Multi purpose stadium in Ahmedabad, Gujarat, India

- Interactive map of Gujarat College Ground
- Location: Ahmedabad, Gujarat
- Coordinates: 23°1′16″N 72°33′42″E

Construction
- Groundbreaking: 1935
- Opened: 1935

Tenant
- Gujarat cricket team (1934/35–1959/60) (occasional)

Website
- ESPNcricinfo

Gujarat College Ground is a multi purpose stadium in Ahmedabad, Gujarat. The ground is mainly used for organizing matches of cricket, football and other sports. The stadium hosted eleven first-class matches between 1935 and 1959, mostly as the home ground for the Gujarat cricket team. The first match was held on February 2–4, 1935, where Gujarat and Bombay played to a draw.
