= Porvorim =

- Town
- Porvorim
- Location in Goa, India Porvorim (India)
- Coordinates: 15.538°N 73.831°E
- Country: India
- State: Goa

Area
  - Total: 8.12 km^{2} (3.14 sq mi)

Population
  - Total: 59,066
  - Density: 7,274/km^{2} (18,840/sq mi)

Languages
  - Official: Konkani
- Time zone: UTC+5:30 (IST)
- Telephone code: 0832
- Vehicle registration: GA-03
- Website: goa.gov.in

Porvorim (pronounced [puːrʋɔrĩ]) is the de facto legislative and executive capital of the state of Goa as both the Goa Legislative Assembly and Secretariat are functioning from the same complex in the region of Alto Porvorim in porvorim.(Alto – Portuguese word meaning high or upper).

It is also the De facto judicial capital of Goa. The High Court of Bombay at Goa (Bombay High Court – Panaji Bench) is now functioning from here in a new building complex overlooking the Mandovi river. Earlier it was functioning from the Lyceum complex in Panaji. Porvorim is situated on the right bank (north bank) of the Mandovi River, as de jure capital of Goa, Panaji is located on the opposite bank. Porvorim is considered an upmarket residential hub as it lies on the Mumbai–Goa highway NH66. Goa's largest shopping centre – Mall De Goa – is situated here.

== History ==
Historically, Porvorim was originally centered on the village market at the crossroad between the Panaji–Mapusa highway and the Socorro–Sangolda road. It used to be the por-vod or last vādo of the village of Socorro. Ecclesiastically speaking, the parish church was Nossa Senhora do Socorro, at Zosvaddo, Socorro; Porvorim was served by the Candelaria chapel near the market, and by the Holy Family chapel (now an independent church) higher up, in Alto Porvorim.

It was the ancestral home of eminent Goans such as Fr. Hubert Olympus Mascarenhas and Julio Ribeiro.

== Development ==
Porvorim is now particularly a residential area with educational institutions around.

Porvorim is situated on the banks of the river Mandovi, with an excellent view of the state capital Panaji from the Mandovi bridge. Porvorim is home to several educational institutions, including the prominent Vidya Probhodhini Education Society, with pre-primary, primary, high school and senior secondary schooling sections.

== Educational and Government Institutes ==
Porvorim is home to several educational and other governmental institutes.

- Directorate of Technical Education
- Goa Board of Secondary and Higher Secondary Education (GBSHSE)
- Vidya Prabodhini Parivar's L.D. Samant High School with Vidya Prabodhini Higher Secondary School
- ACDIL High School
- Holy Family High School
- Jnyan vikas
- Kids Kingdom International School
- Thomas Stefens Konkani Kendra
- Sanjay School for the disabled
- Spring Valley High School
- Teachers training college
- Institute of hotel management

== Government and politics ==
Porvorim is part of Porvorim (Goa Assembly constituency) and North Goa (Lok Sabha constituency).

== Landmarks ==
Porvorim houses the Goa's biggest mall situated on the national highway.

== Hospitals and health centers ==
- Mandovi Clinic
- RG Urology and Laparoscopy Hospital
- Manoshri Children's Hospital-Dr Kini's Clinic
- Chodankar Hospital
- Jesus Mary Joseph Hospital

== Notable people ==
- Libia Lobo Sardesai – Freedom fighter and lawyer from Porvorim who operated the underground radio Voz da Liberdade during Goa’s liberation movement; awarded the Padma Shri in 2025.
- Rohan Khaunte – Politician representing the Porvorim constituency in the Goa Legislative Assembly.
- Erlic Pinto – Air Vice Marshal of the Indian Air Force associated with Porvorim; known for his role during Operation Vijay (1961).
- Julio Ribeiro – Former Commissioner of Police, Mumbai and senior IPS officer with ancestral roots in Porvorim.
- Hubert Olympus Mascarenhas – Catholic priest and scholar born in Porvorim, known for his contributions to theology and Indian philosophy.
- Teotonio R. de Souza – Historian and co-founder of the Xavier Centre of Historical Research in Alto Porvorim.
- Manuel J. D’Lima – Playwright and tiatr director associated with Porvorim’s theatre tradition.
- Ulhas Asnodkar – Former Deputy Speaker of the Goa Legislative Assembly associated with Porvorim.
- Prachi Shirodkar – Documentary filmmaker from Porvorim whose Konkani documentary Bhaangar: Kalakusar Karigiri received national award recognition and international festival selections.
