= 2017 Sunrisers Hyderabad season =

Indian Premier League cricket team season

Sunrisers Hyderabad
2017 season
- Coach: Tom Moody
- Captain: David Warner
- Ground(s): Rajiv Gandhi International Cricket Stadium, Hyderabad (Capacity: 55,000)
- IPL: Playoffs (4th)
- Most runs: David Warner (641)
- Most wickets: Bhuvneshwar Kumar (26)
- Most catches: David Warner (10)
- Most wicket-keeping dismissals: Naman Ojha (6)

Sunrisers Hyderabad (SRH) are a franchise cricket team based in Hyderabad, India, which plays in the Indian Premier League (IPL). They were one of the eight teams that competed in the 2017 Indian Premier League, making their fifth outing in all IPL tournaments. The team was captained by David Warner and coached by Tom Moody with Simon Helmot as assistant coach, Muttiah Muralitharan as bowling coach and VVS Laxman as mentor. The Sunrisers drew an average home attendance of 26,000 in the 2017 IPL season.

They entered this edition as the defending champions and started their campaign against the Royal Challengers Bangalore on 5 April 2017 on a winning note. They qualified for playoffs but got lost to the Kolkata Knight Riders in Eliminator finishing fourth at the end of the tournament. Warner won the Orange Cap in the 2017 IPL by scoring 641 runs and Bhuvneshwar Kumar's 26 wickets won him the Purple Cap.

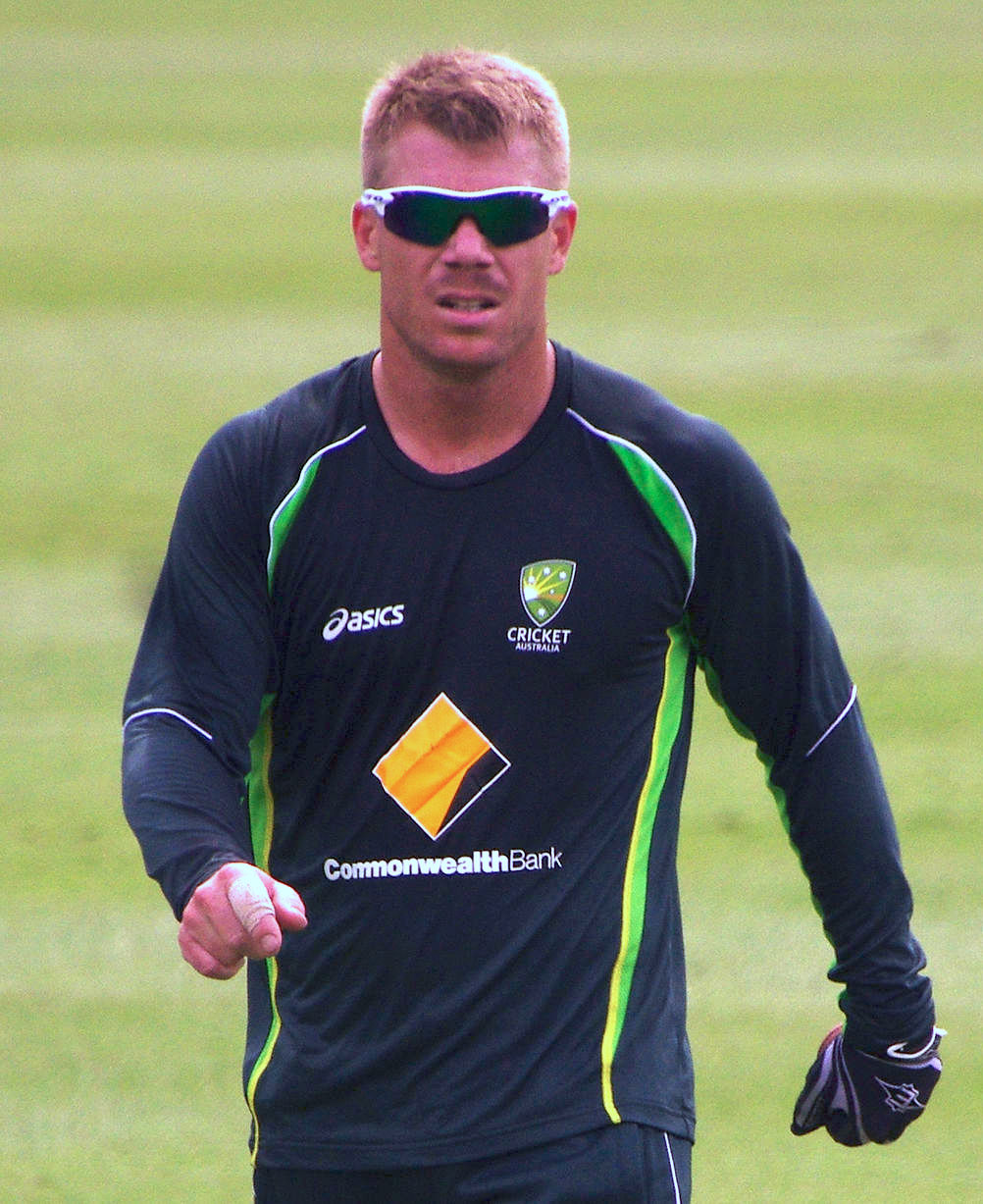
David Warner captained SRH for IPL 2017

== Player acquisition ==
=== Retention ===
The Sunrisers Hyderabad retained 17 players and released 6 players from their 2016 squad. They went into the 2017 IPL auction with the remaining salary cap of ₹209 million (US$2.2 million)

=== Player auction ===
The player auction for the season was held on 20 February 2017 in Bangalore with more than 750 players having registered for the auction. The Sunrisers Hyderabad ended the auction with an addition of 8 players to their squad spending ₹86.5 million (US$910,000).

Retained Players
David Warner, Shikhar Dhawan, Moises Henriques, Ben Cutting, Deepak Hooda, Yuvraj Singh, Kane Williamson, Vijay Shankar, Naman Ojha, Bhuvneshwar Kumar, Barinder Sran, Ashish Nehra, Abhimanyu Mithun, Siddarth Kaul, Bipul Sharma, Mustafizur Rahman and Ricky Bhui

Released players
Trent Boult, Eoin Morgan, Aditya Tare, Tirumalasetti Suman, Karn Sharma and Ashish Reddy

Added Players
Mohammad Nabi, Rashid Khan, Chris Jordan, Tanmay Agarwal, Ben Laughlin, Mohammed Siraj, Eklavya Dwivedi and Pravin Tambe

== Squad ==
- Players with international caps are listed in **bold**.

No.	Name	Nationality	Birth date	Batting style	Bowling style	Year signed	Salary	Notes
Batsmen
11	Tanmay Agarwal	India	3 May 1995 (aged 21)	Right-handed	Right-arm leg break	2017	₹10 lakh (US$15,000)	
22	**Kane Williamson**	New Zealand	8 August 1990 (aged 26)	Right-handed	Right-arm off break	2015	₹60 lakh (US$92,000)	Overseas
25	**Shikhar Dhawan**	India	5 December 1985 (aged 31)	Left-handed	Right-arm off break	2013	₹9.5 crore (US$1.46 million)	
31	**David Warner**	Australia	27 October 1986 (aged 30)	Left-handed	Right-arm leg break	2014	₹5.5 crore (US$840,000)	Captain, Overseas
32	Ricky Bhui	India	29 November 1996 (aged 20)	Right-handed	Right-arm leg break	2014	₹10 lakh (US$15,000)	
All-rounders
5	**Moisés Henriques**	Australia	1 February 1987 (aged 30)	Right-handed	Right-arm medium-fast	2014	₹1 crore (US$150,000)	Overseas
7	**Mohammad Nabi**	Afghanistan	1 January 1985 (aged 32)	Right-handed	Right-arm off break	2017	₹30 lakh (US$46,000)	Overseas
12	**Yuvraj Singh**	India	12 December 1981 (aged 35)	Left-handed	Slow left-arm orthodox	2016	₹7 crore (US$1.07 million)	
14	Deepak Hooda	India	19 April 1995 (aged 21)	Right-handed	Right-arm off break	2016	₹4.2 crore (US$640,000)	
28	Bipul Sharma	India	28 September 1983 (aged 33)	Left-handed	Slow left-arm orthodox	2015	₹10 lakh (US$15,000)	
30	**Ben Cutting**	Australia	30 January 1987 (aged 30)	Right-handed	Right-arm medium-fast	2016	₹50 lakh (US$77,000)	Overseas
59	Vijay Shankar	India	26 January 1991 (aged 26)	Right-handed	Right-arm medium	2016	₹35 lakh (US$54,000)	
Wicket-keepers
53	**Naman Ojha**	India	20 July 1983 (aged 33)	Right-handed	Right-arm medium	2014	₹50 lakh (US$77,000)	
54	Eklavya Dwivedi	India	22 July 1988 (aged 28)	Right-handed	Right-arm wicket keeper	2017	₹75 lakh (US$115,000)	
Bowlers
9	Siddarth Kaul	India	19 May 1990 (aged 26)	Right-handed	Right-arm medium-fast	2016	₹30 lakh (US$46,000)	
13	Mohammed Siraj	India	13 March 1994 (aged 23)	Right-handed	Right-arm fast-medium	2017	₹2.6 crore (US$400,000)	
15	**Bhuvneshwar Kumar**	India	5 February 1990 (aged 27)	Right-handed	Right-arm medium-fast	2014	₹4.25 crore (US$650,000)	
19	**Rashid Khan**	Afghanistan	20 September 1998 (aged 18)	Right-handed	Right-arm leg break	2017	₹4 crore (US$610,000)	Overseas
21	**Abhimanyu Mithun**	India	25 October 1989 (aged 27)	Right-handed	Right-arm medium-fast	2016	₹30 lakh (US$46,000)	
34	**Chris Jordan**	England	4 October 1988 (aged 28)	Right-handed	Right-arm fast-medium	2017	₹50 lakh (US$77,000)	Overseas
51	**Barinder Sran**	India	10 December 1992 (aged 24)	Left-handed	Left-arm fast-medium	2016	₹1.2 crore (US$180,000)	
64	**Ashish Nehra**	India	29 April 1979 (aged 37)	Right-handed	Left-arm medium-fast	2016	₹5.5 crore (US$840,000)	
90	**Mustafizur Rahman**	Bangladesh	6 September 1995 (aged 21)	Left-handed	Left-arm fast-medium	2016	₹1.4 crore (US$210,000)	Overseas
91	**Ben Laughlin**	Australia	3 October 1982 (aged 34)	Right-handed	Right-arm fast-medium	2017	₹30 lakh (US$46,000)	Overseas
92	Pravin Tambe	India	8 October 1971 (aged 45)	Right-handed	Right-arm leg break	2017	₹10 lakh (US$15,000)	

Last updated: 5 April 2017.
Source: ESPNcricinfo

== Administration and support staff ==
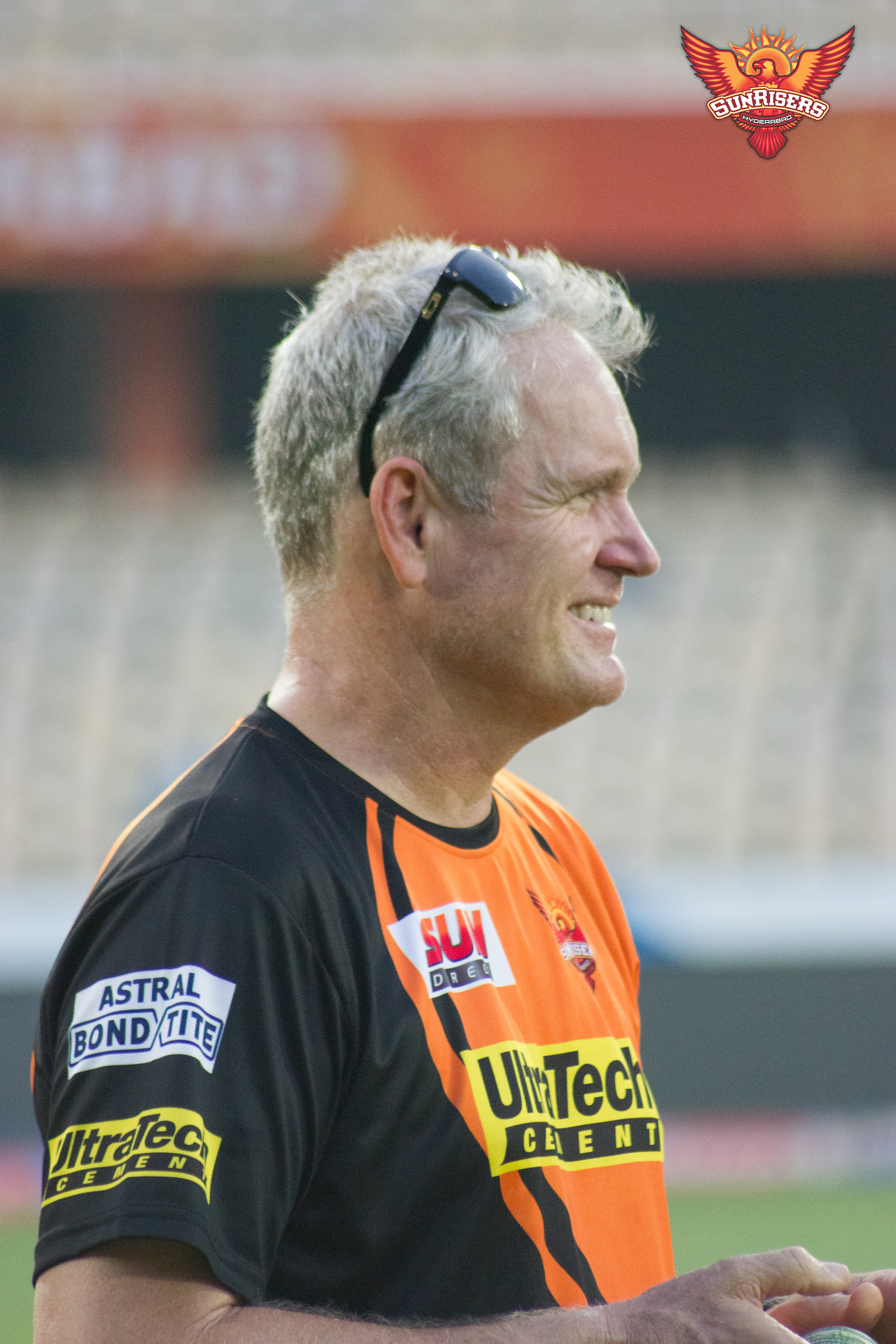
Tom Moody coached SRH in IPL 2017

Position	Name
Owner	Kalanithi Maran (Sun Network)
CEO	K Shanmughan
Head coach	Tom Moody
Assistant coach	Simon Helmot
Bowling coach	Muttiah Muralitharan
Mentor	V. V. S. Laxman
Physio	Theo Kapakoulakis

== Kit manufacturers and sponsors ==
Kit Manufacturers	Shirt Sponsor (Chest)	Shirt Sponsor (Back)
TYKA	UltraTech Cement	Red FM 93.5

T20 uniform

== Opening ceremony ==
Opening ceremony was held on 5 April 2017 at their home, Rajiv Gandhi International Cricket Stadium, Hyderabad. At the opening ceremony four former Indian cricket players Sachin Tendulkar, Virender Sehwag, Sourav Ganguly and V.V.S. Laxman were felicitated. Bollywood actress Amy Jackson also performed in the ceremony.

== Season overview ==
=== League stage ===
Standings

Pos	Team	Pld	W	L	NR	Pts	NRR	
1	Mumbai Indians (C)	14	10	4	0	20	0.784	Advanced to Qualifier 1
2	Rising Pune Supergiant (R)	14	9	5	0	18	0.176	Advanced to Qualifier 1
3	Sunrisers Hyderabad (4)	14	8	5	1	17	0.599	Advanced to the Eliminator
4	Kolkata Knight Riders (3)	14	8	6	0	16	0.641	Advanced to the Eliminator
5	Kings XI Punjab	14	7	7	0	14	−0.009	
6	Delhi Daredevils	14	6	8	0	12	−0.512	
7	Gujarat Lions	14	4	10	0	8	−0.412	
8	Royal Challengers Bangalore	14	3	10	1	7	−1.299	

Source: ESPNcricinfo
The four top ranked teams qualified for the playoffs

Results by match

Match	1	2	3	4	5	6	7	8	9	10	11	12	13	14
Ground	H	H	A	A	H	H	A	A	A	H	A	H	H	A
Result	W	W	L	L	W	W	L	Ab	W	W	L	L	W	W
Position	1	1	2	3	3	2	3	3	3	3	3	4	4	2

Source: Fixtures
A = Away; H = Home; W = Win; D = Draw; L = Loss; Ab = Abandoned

=== Playoff stage ===
Semifinals
16 May — Mumbai
1	Mumbai Indians	142/9 (20 ov)
2	Rising Pune Supergiant	162/4 (20 ov)
17 May — Bangalore
3	Sunrisers Hyderabad	128/7 (20 ov)
4	Kolkata Knight Riders	48/3 (5.2 ov)

Preliminary final
19 May — Bangalore
1	Mumbai Indians	111/4 (14.3 ov)
4	Kolkata Knight Riders	107 (18.5 ov)

Final
21 May — Hyderabad
2	Rising Pune Supergiant	128/6 (20 ov)
1	Mumbai Indians	129/8 (20 ov)

== Fixtures ==
=== League stage ===
5 April	(H) Sunrisers Hyderabad; 207/4 (20 overs)	v	Royal Challengers Bangalore; 172 (19.4 overs)	Sunrisers Hyderabad won by 35 runs
20:00 (D/N) Round 1 Scorecard	(H) Sunrisers Hyderabad; 207/4 (20 overs)	v	Royal Challengers Bangalore; 172 (19.4 overs)	Rajiv Gandhi International Cricket Stadium, Hyderabad; Umpires: Anil Dandekar (India) and Nigel Llong (England); Player of the match: Yuvraj Singh (Sunrisers Hyderabad)
20:00 (D/N) Round 1 Scorecard	Yuvraj Singh 62 (27); Yuzvendra Chahal 1/22 (4 overs)		Chris Gayle 32 (21); Bhuvneshwar Kumar 2/27 (4 overs)	Rajiv Gandhi International Cricket Stadium, Hyderabad; Umpires: Anil Dandekar (India) and Nigel Llong (England); Player of the match: Yuvraj Singh (Sunrisers Hyderabad)
Royal Challengers Bangalore won the toss and elected to field.				Rajiv Gandhi International Cricket Stadium, Hyderabad; Umpires: Anil Dandekar (India) and Nigel Llong (England); Player of the match: Yuvraj Singh (Sunrisers Hyderabad)

9 April	Gujarat Lions; 135/7 (20 overs)	v	(H) Sunrisers Hyderabad; 140/1 (15.3 overs)	Sunrisers Hyderabad won by 9 wickets
16:00 (D/N) Round 2 Scorecard	Gujarat Lions; 135/7 (20 overs)	v	(H) Sunrisers Hyderabad; 140/1 (15.3 overs)	Rajiv Gandhi International Cricket Stadium, Hyderabad; Umpires: Abhijit Deshmukh (India) and Nigel Llong (England); Player of the match: Rashid Khan (Sunrisers Hyderabad)
16:00 (D/N) Round 2 Scorecard	Dwayne Smith 37 (27); Rashid Khan 3/19 (4 overs)		David Warner 76 (45); Praveen Kumar 1/16 (2 overs)	Rajiv Gandhi International Cricket Stadium, Hyderabad; Umpires: Abhijit Deshmukh (India) and Nigel Llong (England); Player of the match: Rashid Khan (Sunrisers Hyderabad)
Sunrisers Hyderabad won the toss and elected to field				Rajiv Gandhi International Cricket Stadium, Hyderabad; Umpires: Abhijit Deshmukh (India) and Nigel Llong (England); Player of the match: Rashid Khan (Sunrisers Hyderabad)

12 April	Sunrisers Hyderabad; 158/8 (20 overs)	v	(H) Mumbai Indians; 159/6 (18.4 overs)	Mumbai Indians won by 4 wickets
20:00 (D/N) Round 3 Scorecard	Sunrisers Hyderabad; 158/8 (20 overs)	v	(H) Mumbai Indians; 159/6 (18.4 overs)	Wankhede Stadium, Mumbai; Umpires: Nitin Menon (India) and C. K. Nandan (India); Player of the match: Jasprit Bumrah (Mumbai Indians)
20:00 (D/N) Round 3 Scorecard	David Warner 49 (34); Jasprit Bumrah 3/24 (4 overs)		Nitish Rana 45 (36); Bhuvneshwar Kumar 3/21 (4 overs)	Wankhede Stadium, Mumbai; Umpires: Nitin Menon (India) and C. K. Nandan (India); Player of the match: Jasprit Bumrah (Mumbai Indians)
Mumbai Indians won the toss and elected to field				Wankhede Stadium, Mumbai; Umpires: Nitin Menon (India) and C. K. Nandan (India); Player of the match: Jasprit Bumrah (Mumbai Indians)

15 April	(H) Kolkata Knight Riders; 172/6 (20 overs)	v	Sunrisers Hyderabad; 155/6 (20 overs)	Kolkata Knight Riders won by 17 runs
16:00 (D/N) Round 4 Scorecard	(H) Kolkata Knight Riders; 172/6 (20 overs)	v	Sunrisers Hyderabad; 155/6 (20 overs)	Eden Gardens, Kolkata; Umpires: Anil Dandekar (India) and Nigel Llong (England); Player of the match: Robin Uthappa (Kolkata Knight Riders)
16:00 (D/N) Round 4 Scorecard	Robin Uthappa 68 (39); Bhuvneshwar Kumar 3/20 (4 overs)		Yuvraj Singh 26 (16); Chris Woakes 2/49 (4 overs)	Eden Gardens, Kolkata; Umpires: Anil Dandekar (India) and Nigel Llong (England); Player of the match: Robin Uthappa (Kolkata Knight Riders)
Sunrisers Hyderabad won the toss and elected to field				Eden Gardens, Kolkata; Umpires: Anil Dandekar (India) and Nigel Llong (England); Player of the match: Robin Uthappa (Kolkata Knight Riders)

17 April	(H) Sunrisers Hyderabad; 159/6 (20 overs)	v	Kings XI Punjab; 154/10 (19.4 overs)	Sunrisers Hyderabad won by 5 runs
20:00 (D/N) Round 5 Scorecard	(H) Sunrisers Hyderabad; 159/6 (20 overs)	v	Kings XI Punjab; 154/10 (19.4 overs)	Rajiv Gandhi International Cricket Stadium, Hyderabad; Umpires: Anil Dandekar (India) and Abhijit Deshmukh (India); Player of the match: Bhuvneshwar Kumar (Sunrisers Hyderabad)
20:00 (D/N) Round 5 Scorecard	David Warner 70* (54); Mohit Sharma 2/25 (4 overs)		Manan Vohra 95 (50); Bhuvneshwar Kumar 5/19 (4 overs)	Rajiv Gandhi International Cricket Stadium, Hyderabad; Umpires: Anil Dandekar (India) and Abhijit Deshmukh (India); Player of the match: Bhuvneshwar Kumar (Sunrisers Hyderabad)
Kings XI Punjab won the toss and elected to field				Rajiv Gandhi International Cricket Stadium, Hyderabad; Umpires: Anil Dandekar (India) and Abhijit Deshmukh (India); Player of the match: Bhuvneshwar Kumar (Sunrisers Hyderabad)

19 April	(H) Sunrisers Hyderabad; 191/4 (20 overs)	v	Delhi Daredevils; 176/5 (20 overs)	Sunrisers Hyderabad won by 15 runs
20:00 (D/N) Round 6 Scorecard	(H) Sunrisers Hyderabad; 191/4 (20 overs)	v	Delhi Daredevils; 176/5 (20 overs)	Rajiv Gandhi International Cricket Stadium, Hyderabad; Umpires: Chris Gaffaney (New Zealand) and Nigel Llong (England); Player of the match: Kane Williamson (Sunrisers Hyderabad)
20:00 (D/N) Round 6 Scorecard	Kane Williamson 89 (51); Chris Morris 4/26 (4 overs)		Shreyas Iyer 50* (31); Mohammed Siraj 2/39 (4 overs)	Rajiv Gandhi International Cricket Stadium, Hyderabad; Umpires: Chris Gaffaney (New Zealand) and Nigel Llong (England); Player of the match: Kane Williamson (Sunrisers Hyderabad)
Sunrisers Hyderabad won the toss and elected to bat				Rajiv Gandhi International Cricket Stadium, Hyderabad; Umpires: Chris Gaffaney (New Zealand) and Nigel Llong (England); Player of the match: Kane Williamson (Sunrisers Hyderabad)

22 April	Sunrisers Hyderabad; 176/3 (20 overs)	v	(H) Rising Pune Supergiant; 179/4 (20 overs)	Rising Pune Supergiants won by 6 wickets
16:00 (D/N) Round 7 Scorecard	Sunrisers Hyderabad; 176/3 (20 overs)	v	(H) Rising Pune Supergiant; 179/4 (20 overs)	Maharashtra Cricket Association Stadium, Pune; Umpires: Anil Dandekar (India) and Abhijit Deshmukh (India); Player of the match: MS Dhoni (Rising Pune Supergiants)
16:00 (D/N) Round 7 Scorecard	Moisés Henriques 55* (28); Dan Christian 1/20 (4 overs)		MS Dhoni 61* (34); Rashid Khan 1/17 (4 overs)	Maharashtra Cricket Association Stadium, Pune; Umpires: Anil Dandekar (India) and Abhijit Deshmukh (India); Player of the match: MS Dhoni (Rising Pune Supergiants)
Rising Pune Supergiants won the toss and elected to field				Maharashtra Cricket Association Stadium, Pune; Umpires: Anil Dandekar (India) and Abhijit Deshmukh (India); Player of the match: MS Dhoni (Rising Pune Supergiants)

25 April	(H) Royal Challengers Bangalore	v	Sunrisers Hyderabad	Match abandoned without a ball bowled
20:00 (D/N) Round 8 Scorecard	(H) Royal Challengers Bangalore	v	Sunrisers Hyderabad	M. Chinnaswamy Stadium, Bangalore

28 April	Sunrisers Hyderabad; 207/3 (20 overs)	v	(H) Kings XI Punjab; 181/9 (20 overs)	Sunrisers Hyderabad won by 26 runs
20:00 (D/N) Round 9 Scorecard	Sunrisers Hyderabad; 207/3 (20 overs)	v	(H) Kings XI Punjab; 181/9 (20 overs)	Punjab Cricket Association IS Bindra Stadium, Mohali; Umpires: Nitin Menon (India) and C. K. Nandan (India); Player of the match: Rashid Khan (Sunrisers Hyderabad)
20:00 (D/N) Round 9 Scorecard	Shikhar Dhawan 77 (48); Glenn Maxwell 2/29 (4 overs)		Shaun Marsh 84 (50); Siddarth Kaul 3/36 (4 overs)	Punjab Cricket Association IS Bindra Stadium, Mohali; Umpires: Nitin Menon (India) and C. K. Nandan (India); Player of the match: Rashid Khan (Sunrisers Hyderabad)
Kings XI Punjab won the toss and elected to field				Punjab Cricket Association IS Bindra Stadium, Mohali; Umpires: Nitin Menon (India) and C. K. Nandan (India); Player of the match: Rashid Khan (Sunrisers Hyderabad)

30 April	(H) Sunrisers Hyderabad; 209/3 (20 overs)	v	Kolkata Knight Riders; 161/7 (20 overs)	Sunrisers Hyderabad won by 48 runs
20:00 (D/N) Round 10 Scorecard	(H) Sunrisers Hyderabad; 209/3 (20 overs)	v	Kolkata Knight Riders; 161/7 (20 overs)	Rajiv Gandhi International Cricket Stadium, Hyderabad; Umpires: Anil Dandekar (India) and S Ravi (India); Player of the match: David Warner (Sunrisers Hyderabad)
20:00 (D/N) Round 10 Scorecard	David Warner 126 (59); Chris Woakes 1/46 (4 overs)		Robin Uthappa 53 (28); Mohammed Siraj 2/26 (4 overs)	Rajiv Gandhi International Cricket Stadium, Hyderabad; Umpires: Anil Dandekar (India) and S Ravi (India); Player of the match: David Warner (Sunrisers Hyderabad)
Kolkata Knight Riders won the toss and elected to field				Rajiv Gandhi International Cricket Stadium, Hyderabad; Umpires: Anil Dandekar (India) and S Ravi (India); Player of the match: David Warner (Sunrisers Hyderabad)

2 May	Sunrisers Hyderabad; 185/3 (20 overs)	v	(H) Delhi Daredevils; 189/4 (19.1 overs)	Delhi Daredevils won by 6 wickets
20:00 (D/N) Round 11 Scorecard	Sunrisers Hyderabad; 185/3 (20 overs)	v	(H) Delhi Daredevils; 189/4 (19.1 overs)	Feroz Shah Kotla, Delhi; Umpires: Yeshwant Barde (India) and Nitin Menon (India); Player of the match: Mohammed Shami (Delhi Daredevils)
20:00 (D/N) Round 11 Scorecard	Yuvraj Singh 70* (41); Mohammed Shami 2/36 (4 overs)		Corey Anderson 41* (24); Mohammed Siraj 2/41 (4 overs)	Feroz Shah Kotla, Delhi; Umpires: Yeshwant Barde (India) and Nitin Menon (India); Player of the match: Mohammed Shami (Delhi Daredevils)
Delhi Daredevils won the toss and elected to field				Feroz Shah Kotla, Delhi; Umpires: Yeshwant Barde (India) and Nitin Menon (India); Player of the match: Mohammed Shami (Delhi Daredevils)

6 May	Rising Pune Supergiant; 148/8 (20 overs)	v	(H) Sunrisers Hyderabad; 136/9 (20 overs)	Rising Pune Supergiant won by 12 runs
16:00 (D/N) Round 12 Scorecard	Rising Pune Supergiant; 148/8 (20 overs)	v	(H) Sunrisers Hyderabad; 136/9 (20 overs)	Rajiv Gandhi International Cricket Stadium, Hyderabad; Umpires: K. N. Ananthapadmanabhan (India) and Anil Chaudhary (India); Player of the match: Jaydev Unadkat (Rising Pune Supergiant)
16:00 (D/N) Round 12 Scorecard	Ben Stokes 39 (25); Siddarth Kaul 4/29 (4 overs)		Yuvraj Singh 47 (43); Jaydev Unadkat 5/30 (4 overs)	Rajiv Gandhi International Cricket Stadium, Hyderabad; Umpires: K. N. Ananthapadmanabhan (India) and Anil Chaudhary (India); Player of the match: Jaydev Unadkat (Rising Pune Supergiant)
Sunrisers Hyderabad won the toss and elected to field				Rajiv Gandhi International Cricket Stadium, Hyderabad; Umpires: K. N. Ananthapadmanabhan (India) and Anil Chaudhary (India); Player of the match: Jaydev Unadkat (Rising Pune Supergiant)

8 May	Mumbai Indians; 138/7 (20 overs)	v	(H) Sunrisers Hyderabad; 140/3 (20 overs)	Sunrisers Hyderabad won by 7 wickets
20:00 (D/N) Round 13 Scorecard	Mumbai Indians; 138/7 (20 overs)	v	(H) Sunrisers Hyderabad; 140/3 (20 overs)	Rajiv Gandhi International Cricket Stadium, Hyderabad; Umpires: K. N. Ananthapadmanabhan (India) and Marais Erasmus (South Africa); Player of the match: Shikhar Dhawan (Sunrisers Hyderabad)
20:00 (D/N) Round 13 Scorecard	Rohit Sharma 67 (45); Siddarth Kaul 3/24 (4 overs)		Shikhar Dhawan 62* (46); Jasprit Bumrah 1/24 (3.2 overs)	Rajiv Gandhi International Cricket Stadium, Hyderabad; Umpires: K. N. Ananthapadmanabhan (India) and Marais Erasmus (South Africa); Player of the match: Shikhar Dhawan (Sunrisers Hyderabad)
Mumbai Indians won the toss and elected to bat				Rajiv Gandhi International Cricket Stadium, Hyderabad; Umpires: K. N. Ananthapadmanabhan (India) and Marais Erasmus (South Africa); Player of the match: Shikhar Dhawan (Sunrisers Hyderabad)

13 May	(H) Gujarat Lions; 154/10 (19.2 overs)	v	Sunrisers Hyderabad; 158/2 (18.1 overs)	Sunrisers Hyderabad won by 8 wickets
16:00 (D/N) Round 14 Scorecard	(H) Gujarat Lions; 154/10 (19.2 overs)	v	Sunrisers Hyderabad; 158/2 (18.1 overs)	Green Park Stadium, Kanpur; Umpires: Anil Chaudhary (India) and Nitin Menon (India); Player of the match: Mohammed Siraj (Sunrisers Hyderabad)
16:00 (D/N) Round 14 Scorecard	Ishan Kishan 61 (40); Mohammed Siraj 4/32 (4 overs)		David Warner 69* (52); Praveen Kumar 2/22 (4 overs)	Green Park Stadium, Kanpur; Umpires: Anil Chaudhary (India) and Nitin Menon (India); Player of the match: Mohammed Siraj (Sunrisers Hyderabad)
Sunrisers Hyderabad won the toss and elected to field				Green Park Stadium, Kanpur; Umpires: Anil Chaudhary (India) and Nitin Menon (India); Player of the match: Mohammed Siraj (Sunrisers Hyderabad)

=== Playoff Stage ===
==== Eliminator ====
17 May	Sunrisers Hyderabad; 128/7 (20 overs)	v	Kolkata Knight Riders; 48/3 (5.2 overs)	Kolkata Knight Riders won by 7 wickets (D/L method)
20:00 (D/N) Eliminator Scorecard	Sunrisers Hyderabad; 128/7 (20 overs)	v	Kolkata Knight Riders; 48/3 (5.2 overs)	M. Chinnaswamy Stadium, Bangalore; Umpires: Anil Chaudhary (India) and Nitin Menon (India); Player of the match: Nathan Coulter-Nile (Kolkata Knight Riders)
20:00 (D/N) Eliminator Scorecard	David Warner 37 (35); Nathan Coulter-Nile 3/20 (4 overs)		Gautham Gambhir 32 (25); Chris Jordan 1/9 (1 over)	M. Chinnaswamy Stadium, Bangalore; Umpires: Anil Chaudhary (India) and Nitin Menon (India); Player of the match: Nathan Coulter-Nile (Kolkata Knight Riders)
Kolkata Knight Riders won the toss and elected to field; Rain interrupted the match after SRH innings, and revised target 48 from 6 overs D/L method.				M. Chinnaswamy Stadium, Bangalore; Umpires: Anil Chaudhary (India) and Nitin Menon (India); Player of the match: Nathan Coulter-Nile (Kolkata Knight Riders)

== Statistics ==
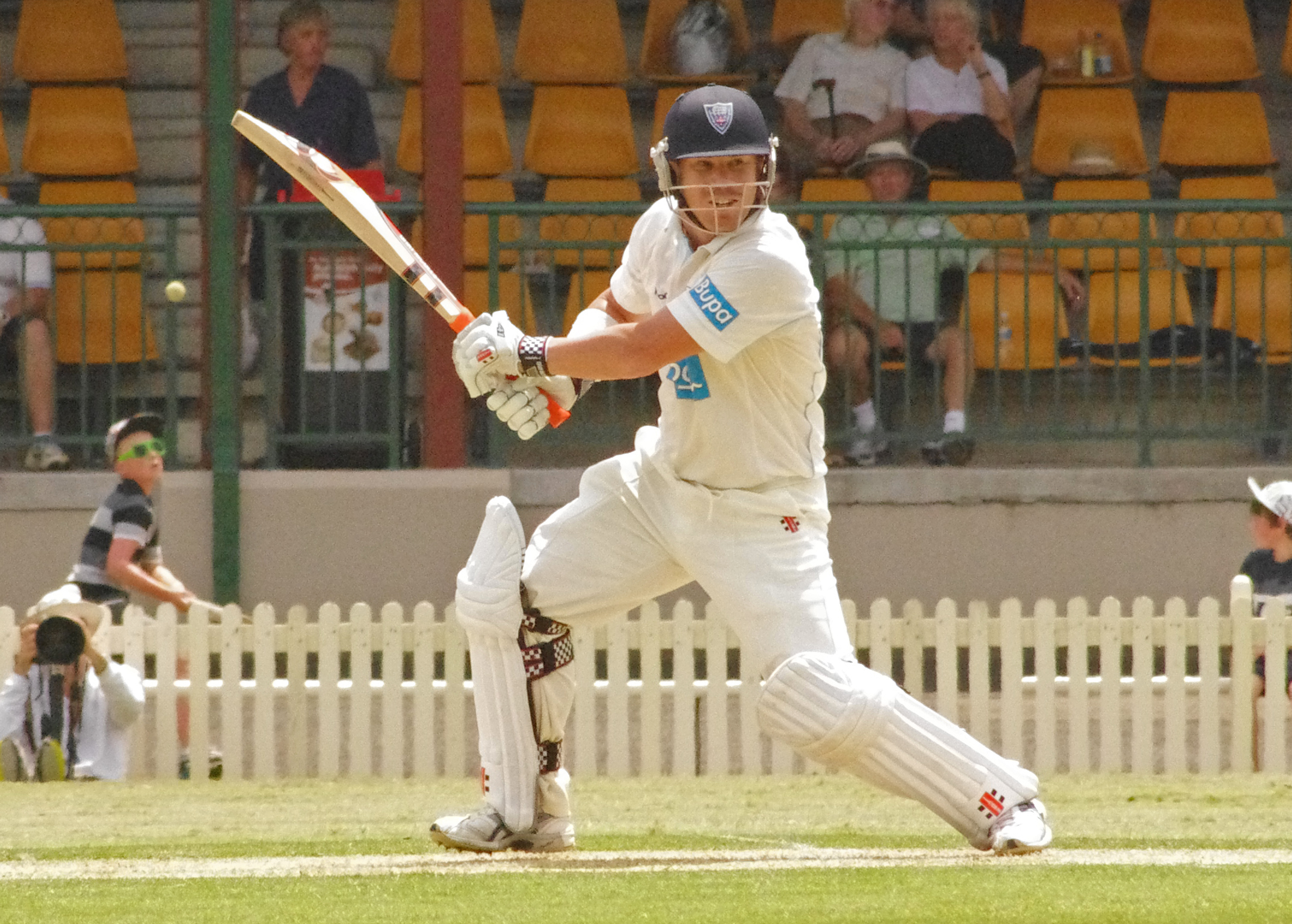
David Warner became highest run-getter for SRH winning Orange Cap in IPL 2017.

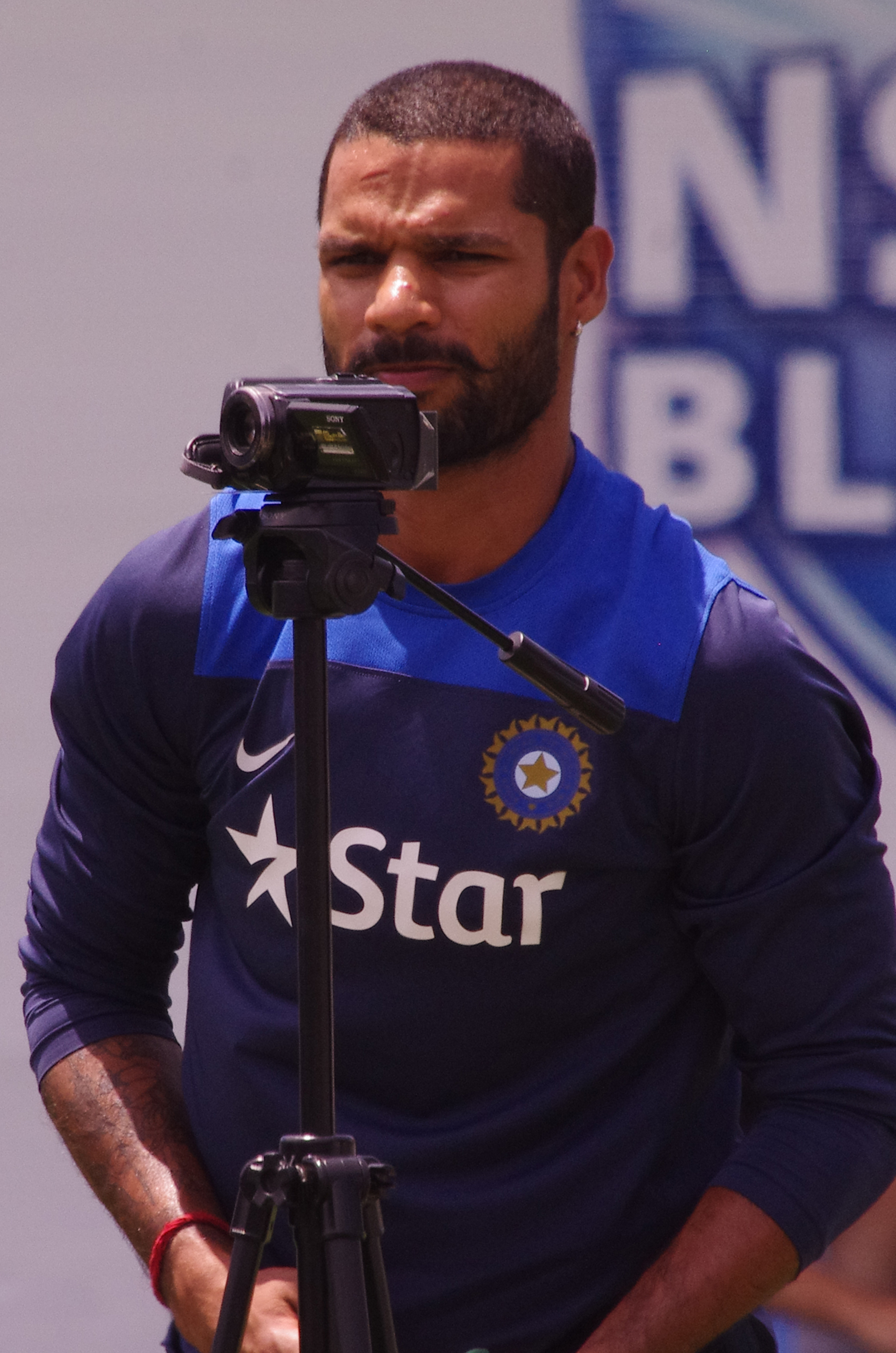
Shikhar Dhawan became second highest run-getter for SRH in IPL 2017.

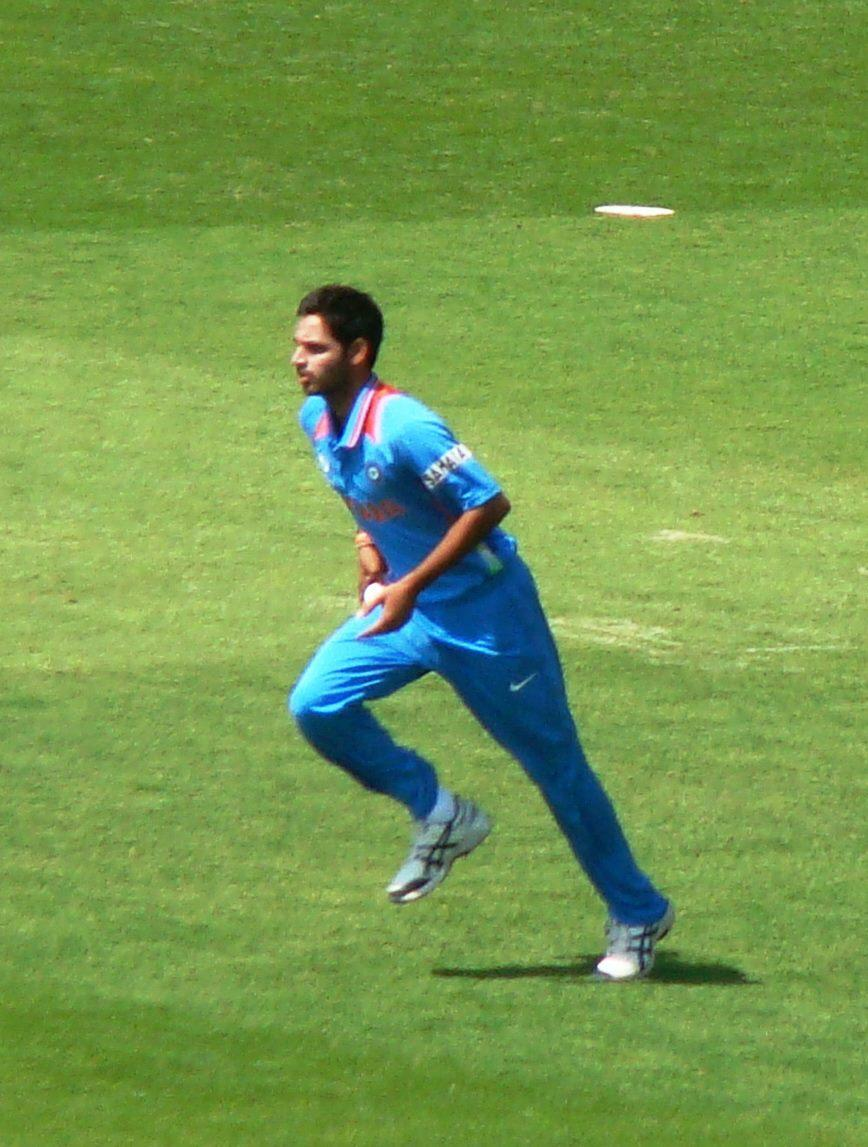
Bhuvneshwar Kumar became highest wicket-taker for SRH winning Purple Cap in IPL 2017.

Name	Mat	Runs	HS	Ave	SR	Wkts	BBI	Ave	Eco	Ct	St
Shikhar Dhawan	14	479	77	36.84	127.39	-	-	-	-	7	0
David Warner	14	641	126	58.27	141.81	-	-	-	-	10	0
Kane Williamson	7	256	89	42.66	151.47	-	-	-	-	1	0
Moisés Henriques	12	277	55*	46.16	136.45	1	1/6	248.00	10.33	5	0
Yuvraj Singh	12	252	70*	28.00	142.37	1	1/6	22.00	11.00	3	0
Deepak Hooda	10	78	19*	26.00	150.00	2	1/7	21.00	10.50	5	0
Vijay Shankar	4	101	63*	50.50	134.66	-	-	-	-	1	0
Naman Ojha	14	79	34	19.75	121.53	-	-	-	-	6	0
Ben Cutting	4	51	20	25.50	196.15	1	-	123.00	9.71	1	0
Chris Jordan	1	0	0*	0.00	0.00	1	1/9	9.00	9.00	1	0
Bipul Sharma	6	31	21*	31.00	138.09	3	1/4	43.00	7.89	1	0
Mohammad Nabi	3	2	2	2.00	66.66	2	1/13	29.00	5.27	0	0
Bhuvneshwar Kumar	14	4	4*	4.00	100.00	26	5/19	14.19	7.05	4	0
Rashid Khan	14	11	6*	5.50	122.22	17	3/19	21.05	6.62	5	0
Ashish Nehra	6	0	0*	-	0.00	8	3/42	24.62	9.30	1	0
Mustafizur Rahman	1	-	-	-	-	0	-	-	12.75	0	0
Barinder Sran	1	-	-	-	-	0	-	-	14.50	0	0
Siddarth Kaul	10	0	0*	-	0.00	16	4/29	18.75	8.41	3	0
Mohammed Siraj	6	-	-	-	-	10	2/26	21.20	9.21	1	0

Full Table on ESPNcricinfo

Last updated: 19 May 2017

== Awards and achievements ==
=== Awards ===
Man of the Match

No.	Date	Player	Opponent	Venue	Result	Contribution	Ref.
1	5 April 2017	Yuvraj Singh	Royal Challengers Bangalore	Hyderabad	Won by 35 Runs	62 (27)	
2	9 April 2017	Rashid Khan	Gujarat Lions	Hyderabad	Won by 9 Wickets	3/19 (4 Overs)	
3	17 April 2017	Bhuvneshwar Kumar	Kings XI Punjab	Hyderabad	Won by 5 Runs	5/19 (4 Overs)	
4	19 April 2017	Kane Williamson	Delhi Daredevils	Hyderabad	Won by 15 Runs	89(51)	
5	28 April 2017	Rashid Khan	Kings XI Punjab	Mohali	Won by 26 Runs	1/16 (4 Overs)	
6	30 April 2017	David Warner	Kolkata Knight Riders	Hyderabad	Won by 48 Runs	126 (59)	
7	8 May 2017	Shikhar Dhawan	Mumbai Indians	Hyderabad	Won by 7 Wickets	62* (46)	
8	13 May 2017	Mohammed Siraj	Gujarat Lions	Kanpur	Won by 8 Wickets	4/32 (4 overs)	

Season Awards

- Winner of Orange Cap: David Warner
- Winner of Purple Cap: Bhuvneshwar Kumar
- Vitara Brezza Glam Shot of the year: Yuvraj Singh

=== Achievements ===
- Second team after Chennai Super Kings in 2013 Indian Premier League to win both Orange Cap and Purple Cap.
- Warner becomes the First player to score 100+ as a captain and also for SRH
- Warner scores the highest score as a captain in all the IPL seasons.
- Most fours scored in the 2017 IPL: Warner (63)
- Fastest century in the 2017 IPL: Warner (43 balls)
- Highest score in the 2017 IPL: Warner (126)
- Most four wickets in the 2017 IPL: Siddarth Kaul (1)

== Reaction ==
The 2017 season performances helped the IPL see its brand value jump by 26% to the estimated value of US$5.3 billion. The SunRisers also saw the increase in their brand value by 37% to US$56 million in 2017, according to Duff & Phelps.

== See also ==
- List of Sunrisers Hyderabad records
