= Zimbabwean cricket team in India in 2026–27 =

International cricket tour

Zimbabwean cricket team in India in 2026-27
	India	Zimbabwe
- Dates: 3 – 9 January 2027

One Day International series

The Zimbabwean cricket team is scheduled to tour India in January 2027 to play the India national cricket team. The tour will consist of three One Day International (ODI) matches. In March 2026, the Board of Control for Cricket in India (BCCI) confirmed the fixtures for the tour, as a part of the 2026–27 home international season. It will be the first time since 2002 that Zimbabwe tour India for a bilateral series.

== ODI series ==
=== 1st ODI ===
3 January 2027
14:00 (D/N)
Scorecard

India	v	Zimbabwe

Eden Gardens, Kolkata

=== 2nd ODI ===
6 January 2027
14:00 (D/N)
Scorecard

India	v	Zimbabwe

Rajiv Gandhi International Cricket Stadium, Hyderabad

=== 3rd ODI ===
9 January 2027
14:00 (D/N)
Scorecard

India	v	Zimbabwe

Wankhede Stadium, Mumbai
