= 2017 Indian Premier League final =

- Event: 2017 Indian Premier League
Mumbai Indians	Rising Pune Supergiant
129/8	128/6
20 overs	20 overs
- Mumbai Indians won by 1 run
- Date: 21 May 2017
- Venue: Rajiv Gandhi International Cricket Stadium, Hyderabad
- Player of the match: Krunal Pandya (MI)
- Umpires: Nigel Llong (Eng); Sundaram Ravi (Ind)
- Attendance: 34,158

The 2017 Indian Premier League final was a day/night Twenty20 cricket match between the Mumbai Indians and the Rising Pune Supergiant, on 21 May 2017, at Rajiv Gandhi International Cricket Stadium, Hyderabad. It was held to determine the winner of the 2017 season of the Indian Premier League, an annual Twenty20 tournament in India.

Mumbai, playing in their fourth IPL final, defeated Pune by 1 run to win their third title. Mumbai's Krunal Pandya was awarded man of the match award for his innings of 47. The final was sold out, with a final attendance of 34,158.

== Road to the final ==
=== League stage ===
Mumbai and Pune were ranked first and second respectively on the league table. Mumbai had a successful first half of the season, winning six out of six matches after their opening game defeat to Pune. They managed four wins in the second half of the league stage, and finished on top of the league table with 20 points. Mumbai's success in the first half of the season was built around contributions from various batsmen, Nitish Rana and Jos Buttler in particular, as well as Mitchell McClenaghan, Jasprit Bumrah and Krunal Pandya among the bowlers. However, in the first week of May, Mumbai replaced Buttler, who was to leave for national duty after the league stage, with Lendl Simmons to open the innings, while Rana had a loss of form that led to him being benched, and Pandya was sidelined for over ten days with an injury.

Pune began the season with three defeats in their first four games, with their inexperienced bowling lineup and multimillion-dollar signing Ben Stokes struggling. After this, Pune formed a settled bowling attack led by Jaydev Unadkat, Shardul Thakur, Stokes and Imran Tahir, and went on to win eight of their remaining ten matches. Stokes turned out to be a match-winner with both bat and ball, winning three man of the match awards, while Rahul Tripathi and captain Steve Smith produced consistent performances with the bat. The team was also buoyed by 17-year-old Washington Sundar's economical bowling and Manoj Tiwary's lower-order cameos, but had Stokes and Tahir departing for their respective countries on national duty at the end of the league stage.

League progression
Team	Group matches														Playoffs		
Team	1	2	3	4	5	6	7	8	9	10	11	12	13	14	Q1/E	Q2	F
Mumbai Indians	0	2	4	6	8	10	12	12	14	16	18	18	18	20	L	W	W
Rising Pune Supergiant	2	2	2	2	4	6	8	8	10	12	14	16	16	18	W		L

Win	Loss	No result

- Note: The total points at the end of each group match are listed.
- Note: Click on the points (group matches) or W/L (playoffs) to see the match summary.

==== League stage series ====
6 April (D/N)
Match 2
Scorecard

Mumbai Indians; 184/8 (20 overs)	v	Rising Pune Supergiant (H); 187/3 (19.5 overs)

Rising Pune Supergiant won by 7 wickets
Maharashtra Cricket Association Stadium, Pune

24 April (D/N)
Match 28
Scorecard

Rising Pune Supergiant; 160/6 (20 overs)	v	Mumbai Indians (H); 157/8 (20 overs)

Rising Pune Supergiant won by 3 runs
Wankhede Stadium, Mumbai

Pune won both league stage meetings against Mumbai. In the first meeting at Pune, Mumbai posted 184/8 in 20 overs after being put into bat, largely thanks to Hardik Pandya's 35 not out off 15 balls coming in at number eight. Pune then chased down the total in the final over, having lost only three wickets, with captain Smith top-scoring with an unbeaten 84 and Ajinkya Rahane scoring a 34-ball 60. In the second encounter between the two teams, Mumbai opted to field first, having prior to the match won all five games in the season in which they batted second. Pune put up 160/6 on the board, Tripathi top-scoring with 45. Mumbai, in reply, could manage only 157/8 in 20 overs, falling short by 3 runs despite captain Rohit Sharma's 58 off 39 balls. This ended Mumbai's six-match winning streak; Stokes won man of the match for his bowling figures of 2/21 in 4 overs.

=== Playoff stage ===
The playoff stage was played according to the Page playoff system and provided Mumbai and Pune, being the top- and second-ranked teams, with two ways of qualifying for the Final. They first faced each other in Qualifier 1, where the winners would qualify for the Final. The losers of Qualifier 1 would play against the winners of the Eliminator in Qualifier 2; the winners of this match would also qualify for the Final.

16 May (D/N)
Qualifier 1
Scorecard

Rising Pune Supergiant; 162/4 (20 overs)	v	Mumbai Indians (H); 142/9 (20 overs)

Rising Pune Supergiant won by 20 runs
Wankhede Stadium, Mumbai

The Qualifier 1 was played at the Wankhede Stadium, home ground of Mumbai, where the home team won the toss and elected to bowl first at a venue favorable to teams batting second. Pune were reduced to 9 for 2 after the first two overs, with their top two batsmen of the season Tripathi and Smith dismissed for 0 and 1 respectively. Rahane and Tiwary then put up an 80-run partnership for the third wicket, scoring at close to 8 runs per over. After the fall of Rahane for 56 in the 13th over, Tiwary and MS Dhoni initially struggled to score freely on the "slow" and "two-paced" pitch and the score read 121/3 after 18 overs. The last two overs, however, yielded 41 runs which included 26 runs off the penultimate over by McClenaghan. Dhoni remained unbeaten on 40 from 26 balls with five sixes, whereas Tiwary was dismissed run out off the last ball of the innings for 58. Pune's total of 162 was thought to be "below par".

In reply, the Mumbai runchase started on a positive note with Parthiv Patel batting aggressively in the powerplay. The run out of Simmons in the fifth over was followed by off-spinner Sundar taking three wickets (captain Sharma, Ambati Rayudu and Kieron Pollard) in two overs. Mumbai continued losing wickets at regular intervals and could only manage to score 142/9 in their 20 overs, falling short by 20 runs. Pune thus advanced to the Final for the first time and completed a hat-trick of wins over Mumbai in the season; Sundar won man of the match for his bowling efforts (3/16 in 4 overs).

19 May (D/N)
Qualifier 2
Scorecard

Kolkata Knight Riders; 107 (18.5 overs)	v	Mumbai Indians; 111/4 (14.3 overs)

Mumbai Indians won by 6 wickets
M. Chinnaswamy Stadium, Bangalore

In Qualifier 2 at Bangalore, Mumbai took on the Kolkata Knight Riders who had knocked out defending champions Sunrisers Hyderabad in the Eliminator. Sharma won the toss again and elected to field keeping in mind the possibility of rain which had affected the Eliminator. The bowlers backed the captain's decision by taking early wickets to reduce Kolkata to 31/5 after 7 overs. Ishank Jaggi and Suryakumar Yadav offered some resistance for Kolkata who were eventually bowled out for 107 in the 19th over. For Mumbai, leg-spinner Karn Sharma took 4 for 16 while Bumrah took 3 for 7. In their runchase Mumbai were in a precarious position of 34/3, before Krunal Pandya came to the crease and guided them to victory with an unbeaten 30-ball 45. Mumbai qualified for the Final with this win, setting up the season's fourth encounter with cross-expressway rivals Pune.

== Final ==
=== Background ===
The final was played at the neutral venue of Rajiv Gandhi International Cricket Stadium, Hyderabad, the home of the previous season champions. This was Mumbai Indians' fourth appearance in an IPL final, having won twice and lost once in the finals before. The Rising Pune Supergiant, in their second and final year in the IPL, were playing in their first final. Pune led the overall head-to-head record 4–1, and had beaten Mumbai in all three previous meetings in the season.

Pune were without Ben Stokes, the leader of the Most Valuable Player of the season, and Mumbai without Jos Buttler for the final. Both players were recalled by the England and Wales Cricket Board at the conclusion of the league stage to join a training camp in Spain ahead of the 2017 ICC Champions Trophy. Pune also missed the services of their premier spinner Imran Tahir who had returned to South Africa for England tour and Champions Trophy preparation. Mumbai's leading wicket-taker of the season Mitchell McClenaghan, who had missed Qualifier 2 with an injury, was ruled out of the final as well.

=== Report ===
Mumbai captain Rohit Sharma won the toss and elected to bat first on what he believed to be a "good pitch" which "plays a little slower in the second innings"; Pune captain Steve Smith said he would also have batted first. Both teams were unchanged from their respective previous matches.

Mumbai made a poor start to their innings, losing both openers to Jaydev Unadkat in the third over of the innings. As the run rate slowed down, Sharma looked to counter-attack and struck four boundaries off Lockie Ferguson in the last over of powerplay. Ferguson came back to remove Ambati Rayudu in his next over, while Adam Zampa got the wickets of Sharma and Kieron Pollard in the 11th over. The form continued as they made it to 81 for 7 after 15 overs. The last recognised batsman Krunal Pandya then scored rapidly, making 47 runs from 38 deliveries, with tail-end support from Australian Mitchell Johnson who scored 13. Mumbai's innings concluded at 129 for 8 in 20 overs.

Pune started positively in their runchase, despite losing Rahul Tripathi early in the innings. After being dropped on 14, Ajinkya Rahane made 44 from 38 deliveries, putting up a 54-run partnership with Smith which ended with Rahane's dismissal in the 12th over. Economical bowling from Mumbai bowlers restricted Pune to 83 for 2 after 15 overs, leaving them 47 to get from the last 5 overs. Pune struck 14 runs in the 16th over to tilt the match in their favour, before Jasprit Bumrah dismissed MS Dhoni in the next over in which he conceded only 3 runs. Pune reached 119 for 3 at the end of 19 overs with a six from Smith off the penultimate ball of the penultimate over, and the equation read 11 runs to get in the final over to be bowled by Johnson. Manoj Tiwary struck a four off the first ball, before he and Smith were dismissed caught in the deep in the next two deliveries. A drop catch off the penultimate ball allowed Pune to get two runs and come within four runs of the target with one ball to go. On the final ball of the innings, Dan Christian ran two and Washington Sundar was run out attempting a third run, resulting in a thrilling one-run victory for Mumbai Indians.

== Scorecard ==
- On-field umpires: Nigel Llong (Eng) and Sundaram Ravi (Ind)
- Third umpire: Anil Chaudhary (Ind)
- Reserve umpire: Nand Kishore (Ind)
- Match referee: Javagal Srinath (Ind)
- Toss: Mumbai Indians won the toss and elected to bat

Mumbai Indians batting
Player	Status	Runs	Balls	4s	6s	Strike rate
Lendl Simmons	c & b Unadkat	3	8	0	0	37.50
Parthiv Patel	c Thakur b Unadkat	4	6	0	0	66.66
Ambati Rayudu	run out (Steven Smith)	12	15	1	0	80.00
Rohit Sharma	C Zampa	24	22	4	0	109.09
Krunal Pandya	C Rahane b Christian	47	38	3	2	123.68
Kieron Pollard	C Manoj Tiwary b Zampa	7	3	0	1	233.33
Hardik Pandya	lbw b Christian	10	9	0	1	111.11
Karn Sharma	run out (Christian/Thakur)	1	5	0	0	20.00
Mitchell Johnson	run out	13	14	0	1	92.85
Jasprit Bumrah	did not bat					
Lasith Malinga	did not bat					

Rising Pune Supergiants bowling
Bowler	Overs	Maidens	Runs	Wickets	Econ	Wides	NBs
Jaydev Unadkat	4	0	19	2	4.75	{{{wides}}}	{{{no-balls}}}
Washington Sundar	4	0	13	0	3.25	{{{wides}}}	{{{no-balls}}}
Shardul Thakur	2	0	7	0	3.50	{{{wides}}}	{{{no-balls}}}
Lockie Ferguson	2	0	21	0	10.50	{{{wides}}}	{{{no-balls}}}
Adam Zampa	4	0	32	2	8.00	{{{wides}}}	{{{no-balls}}}
Daniel Christian	4	0	34	2	8.50	{{{wides}}}	{{{no-balls}}}

Rising Pune Supergiants Batting
Player	Status	Runs	Balls	4s	6s	Strike rate
Ajinkya Rahane	c Pollard b Johnson	44	38	5	0	115.78
Rahul Tripathi	lbw b Bumrah	3	8	0	0	37.50
Steve Smith	c Rayudu b Johnson	51	50	2	2	102.00
MS Dhoni	c Patel b Bumrah	10	13	1	0	76.92
Manoj Tiwary	c Pollard b Johnson	7	8	1	0	87.50
Daniel Christian	run out (Parthiv Patel)	4	2	0	0	200.00
Washington Sundar	not out	0	1	0	0	0.00
Lockie Ferguson	did not bat					
Adam Zampa	did not bat					
Shardul Thakur	did not bat					
Jaydev Unadkat	did not bat					

Mumbai Indians bowling
Bowler	Overs	Maidens	Runs	Wickets	Econ	Wides	NBs
Krunal Pandya	4	0	31	0	7.75	{{{wides}}}	{{{no-balls}}}
Mitchell Johnson	4	0	26	3	6.50	{{{wides}}}	{{{no-balls}}}
Jasprit Bumrah	4	0	26	2	6.50	{{{wides}}}	{{{no-balls}}}
Lasith Malinga	4	0	21	0	5.25	{{{wides}}}	{{{no-balls}}}
Karn Sharma	4	0	18	0	4.50	{{{wides}}}	{{{no-balls}}}

=== Summary ===
It was Mumbai's third IPL title, making them the first team to have won the IPL title more than twice. Mumbai's total of 129 was also the lowest total successfully defended in an IPL final. Krunal Pandya was awarded man of the match for his 38-ball 47. Pune all-rounder Stokes won the Most Valuable Player award for the season. Mumbai won a prize money of ₹15 crore for becoming the champions, while runners-up Pune were awarded ₹10 crore.
