= 2017 Indian Premier League =

Cricket tournament

- Dates: 5 April – 21 May 2017
- Administrator: Board of Control for Cricket in India
- Cricket format: Twenty20
- Tournament format(s): Double round robin and playoffs
- Champions: Mumbai Indians (3rd title)
- Runners-up: Rising Pune Supergiant
- Participants: 8
- Matches: 60
- Most valuable player: Ben Stokes (RPS)
- Most runs: David Warner (SRH) (641)
- Most wickets: Bhuvneshwar Kumar (SRH) (26)
- Official website: www.iplt20.com

The 2017 Indian Premier League season (also known as IPL 10 and branded as Vivo IPL 2017) was the tenth edition of the Indian Premier League, a professional Twenty20 cricket league established by the BCCI in 2007. The tournament featured the eight teams that played in the previous season. The 2017 season started on 5 April 2017 and finished on 21 May 2017, with Hyderabad hosting the opening match and the final. Mumbai Indians won by 1 run against Rising Pune Supergiant in the final, winning their third title making them the first team to achieve the milestone. The tagline Dus saal aapke naam (10 years of IPL). This was the last time that Sony Television Network broadcast the tournament before Star Sports Network snatchthe broadcasting rights from the 11th season and are currently bearing the broadcasting rights for the tournament.

Sunrisers Hyderabad captain David Warner won the Orange Cap for the leading run-scorer of the tournament with 641 runs. Bhuvneshwar Kumar, also of Sunrisers Hyderabad, was awarded the Purple Cap for finishing as the leading wicket-taker of the tournament with 26 wickets. Rising Pune Supergiant's Ben Stokes was named the Most Valuable Player, while Basil Thampi of Gujarat Lions was named the Emerging Player of the Tournament.

== Format ==
Eight teams were contesting the season. The schedule for the tournament was published on 15 February 2017. The league stage, consisting of 56 matches, took place between 5 April and 14 May 2017. The top four teams qualified for the play-offs, with the final held in Hyderabad on 21 May.

== Venues ==
Ten venues were selected to host the matches. The opening match and the final were played at the Rajiv Gandhi International Cricket Stadium in Hyderabad.

Bangalore	Delhi	Hyderabad
Royal Challengers Bangalore	Delhi Daredevils	Sunrisers Hyderabad
M. Chinnaswamy Stadium	Feroz Shah Kotla	Rajiv Gandhi International Cricket Stadium
Capacity: 35,000	Capacity: 41,000	Capacity: 55,000
Indore	2017 Indian Premier League is located in India	Kanpur
Kings XI Punjab	2017 Indian Premier League is located in India	Gujarat Lions
Holkar Cricket Stadium	2017 Indian Premier League is located in India	Green Park
Capacity: 30,000	2017 Indian Premier League is located in India	Capacity: 33,000
Kolkata	2017 Indian Premier League is located in India	Mohali
Kolkata Knight Riders	2017 Indian Premier League is located in India	Kings XI Punjab
Eden Gardens	2017 Indian Premier League is located in India	Punjab Cricket Association IS Bindra Stadium
Capacity: 68,000	2017 Indian Premier League is located in India	Capacity: 26,000
Mumbai	Pune	Rajkot
Mumbai Indians	Rising Pune Supergiant	Gujarat Lions
Wankhede Stadium	Maharashtra Cricket Association Stadium	Saurashtra Cricket Association Stadium
Capacity: 33,000	Capacity: 42,000	Capacity: 28,000

== Personnel changes ==
The retention lists for the season were announced in December 2016. On 3 February, the BCCI announced that the player auction would be held on 20 February 2017 in Bengaluru with a total of 799 players registered for it. On 14 February, the IPL Desk released a list of 351 players. Out of the 351 players shortlisted, 66 players were sold at the 2017 IPL Auction.

== Opening ceremonies ==
Unlike the previous IPL seasons each of which had a single opening ceremony, the 2017 season featured opening ceremonies at each venue before the start of the first match at the venue. The ceremonies included performances by Amy Jackson (at Hyderabad); Shalmali Kholgade and Riteish Deshmukh (at Pune); Bhoomi Trivedi, Sachin–Jigar and Tiger Shroff (at Rajkot); Harshdeep Kaur and Disha Patani (at Indore); Benny Dayal and Kriti Sanon (at Bangalore); Sushant Singh Rajput and Malaika Arora (at Mumbai); Shillong Chamber Choir, Monali Thakur and Shraddha Kapoor (at Kolkata); Raftaar, Yami Gautam and Guru Randhawa (at Delhi).

== Teams and standings ==
=== Points table ===
Pos	Team	Pld	W	L	NR	Pts	NRR	
1	Mumbai Indians (C)	14	10	4	0	20	0.784	Advanced to Qualifier 1
2	Rising Pune Supergiant (R)	14	9	5	0	18	0.176	Advanced to Qualifier 1
3	Sunrisers Hyderabad (4)	14	8	5	1	17	0.599	Advanced to the Eliminator
4	Kolkata Knight Riders (3)	14	8	6	0	16	0.641	Advanced to the Eliminator
5	Kings XI Punjab	14	7	7	0	14	−0.009	
6	Delhi Daredevils	14	6	8	0	12	−0.512	
7	Gujarat Lions	14	4	10	0	8	−0.412	
8	Royal Challengers Bangalore	14	3	10	1	7	−1.299	

Source: ESPNcricinfo
The four top ranked teams qualified for the playoffs

("C" refers to the "Champions" of the Tournament. 'R'(2nd Position), '3' and '4' are the positions of the respective teams in the tournament.)

=== Match summary ===
Team	Group matches														Playoffs			
Team	1	2	3	4	5	6	7	8	9	10	11	12	13	14	Q1	E	Q2	F
Delhi Daredevils	0	2	4	4	4	4	4	4	6	8	8	10	12	12				
Gujarat Lions	0	0	2	2	2	4	4	6	6	6	6	8	8	8				
Kings XI Punjab	2	4	4	4	4	4	6	6	8	10	10	12	14	14				
Kolkata Knight Riders	2	2	4	6	8	8	10	12	14	14	14	16	16	16		W	L	
Mumbai Indians	0	2	4	6	8	10	12	12	14	16	18	18	18	20	L		W	W
Rising Pune Supergiant	2	2	2	2	4	6	8	8	10	12	14	16	16	18	W			L
Royal Challengers Bengaluru	0	2	2	2	2	4	4	5	5	5	5	5	5	7				
Sunrisers Hyderabad	2	4	4	4	6	8	8	9	11	13	13	13	15	17		L		

Win	Loss	No result

- Note: The total points at the end of each group match are listed.
- Note: Click on the points (group matches) or W/L (playoffs) to see the match summary.

Visitor team →	DD	GL	KXIP	KKR	MI	RPS	RCB	SRH
Home team ↓	DD	GL	KXIP	KKR	MI	RPS	RCB	SRH
Delhi Daredevils		Delhi; 7 wickets	Delhi; 51 runs	Kolkata; 4 wickets	Mumbai; 146 runs	Delhi; 7 runs	Bengaluru; 10 runs	Delhi; 6 wickets
Gujarat Lions	Delhi; 2 wickets		Punjab; 26 runs	Kolkata; 10 wickets	Mumbai; Super Over	Gujarat; 7 wickets	Bengaluru; 21 runs	Hyderabad; 8 wickets
Kings XI Punjab	Punjab; 10 wickets	Gujarat; 6 wickets		Punjab; 14 runs	Mumbai; 8 wickets	Punjab; 6 wickets	Punjab; 8 wickets	Hyderabad; 26 runs
Kolkata Knight Riders	Kolkata; 7 wickets	Gujarat; 4 wickets	Kolkata; 8 wickets		Mumbai; 9 runs	Pune; 4 wickets	Kolkata; 82 runs	Kolkata; 17 runs
Mumbai Indians	Mumbai; 14 runs	Mumbai; 6 wickets	Punjab; 7 runs	Mumbai; 4 wickets		Pune; 3 runs	Mumbai; 5 wickets	Mumbai; 4 wickets
Rising Pune Supergiant	Delhi; 97 runs	Pune; 5 wickets	Pune; 9 wickets	Kolkata; 7 wickets	Pune; 7 wickets		Pune; 61 runs	Pune; 6 wickets
Royal Challengers Bengaluru	Bengaluru; 15 runs	Gujarat; 7 wickets	Punjab; 19 runs	Kolkata; 6 wickets	Mumbai; 4 wickets	Pune; 27 runs		Match abandoned
Sunrisers Hyderabad	Hyderabad; 15 runs	Hyderabad; 9 wickets	Hyderabad; 5 runs	Hyderabad; 48 runs	Hyderabad; 7 wickets	Pune; 12 runs	Hyderabad; 35 runs	

Home team won	Visitor team won

- Note: Results listed are according to the home (horizontal) and visitor (vertical) teams.
- Note: Click on a result to see a summary of the match.

== League stage ==
=== Match results ===
5 April (D/N)
Scorecard

(H) Sunrisers Hyderabad; 207/4 (20 overs)	v	Royal Challengers Bangalore; 172 (19.4 overs)
Yuvraj Singh 62 (27); Stuart Binny 1/10 (1 over)		Chris Gayle 32 (21); Bhuvneshwar Kumar 2/27 (4 overs)

Sunrisers Hyderabad won by 35 runs
Rajiv Gandhi International Cricket Stadium, Hyderabad
Attendance: 33,126
Umpires: Anil Dandekar (India) and Nigel Llong (England)
Player of the match: Yuvraj Singh (Sunrisers Hyderabad)

- Royal Challengers Bangalore won the toss and elected to field.

6 April (D/N)
Scorecard

Mumbai Indians; 184/8 (20 overs)	v	Rising Pune Supergiant (H); 187/3 (19.5 overs)
Jos Buttler 38 (19); Imran Tahir 3/28 (4 overs)		Steve Smith 84* (54); Tim Southee 1/34 (4 overs)

Rising Pune Supergiant won by 7 wickets
Maharashtra Cricket Association Stadium, Pune
Umpires: Nand Kishore (India) and Sundaram Ravi (India)
Player of the match: Steve Smith (Rising Pune Supergiant)

- Rising Pune Supergiant won the toss and elected to field.

7 April (D/N)
Scorecard

(H) Gujarat Lions; 183/4 (20 overs)	v	Kolkata Knight Riders; 184/0 (14.5 overs)
Suresh Raina 68* (51); Kuldeep Yadav 2/25 (4 overs)		Chris Lynn 93* (41); Praveen Kumar 0/13 (2 overs)

Kolkata Knight Riders won by 10 wickets
Saurashtra Cricket Association Stadium, Rajkot
Umpires: Nitin Menon (India) and C. K. Nandan (India)
Player of the match: Chris Lynn (Kolkata Knight Riders)

- Kolkata Knight Riders won the toss and elected to field.
- This was the highest total successfully chased without losing a wicket in a T20 match.

8 April (D/N)
Scorecard

Rising Pune Supergiant; 163/6 (20 overs)	v	Kings XI Punjab (H); 164/4 (19 overs)
Ben Stokes 50 (32); Sandeep Sharma 2/33 (4 overs)		Glenn Maxwell 44* (20); Imran Tahir 2/29 (4 overs)

Kings XI Punjab won by 6 wickets
Holkar Stadium, Indore
Umpires: Anil Chaudhary (India) and Chettithody Shamshuddin (India)
Player of the match: Glenn Maxwell (Kings XI Punjab)

- Kings XI Punjab won the toss and elected to field.
- Rahul Chahar (Rising Pune Supergiant) made his T20 debut.

8 April (D/N)
Scorecard

(H) Royal Challengers Bangalore; 157/8 (20 overs)	v	Delhi Daredevils; 142/9 (20 overs)
Kedar Jadhav 69 (37); Chris Morris 3/21 (4 overs)		Rishabh Pant 57 (36); Pawan Negi 2/3 (1 over)

Royal Challengers Bangalore won by 15 runs
M. Chinnaswamy Stadium, Bangalore
Umpires: Sundaram Ravi (India) and Virender Sharma (India)
Player of the match: Kedar Jadhav (Royal Challengers Bangalore)

- Royal Challengers Bangalore won the toss and elected to bat.

9 April (D/N)
Scorecard

Gujarat Lions; 135/7 (20 overs)	v	Sunrisers Hyderabad (H); 140/1 (15.3 overs)
Dwayne Smith 37 (27); Rashid Khan 3/19 (4 overs)		David Warner 76* (45); Praveen Kumar 1/16 (2 overs)

Sunrisers Hyderabad won by 9 wickets
Rajiv Gandhi International Cricket Stadium, Hyderabad
Umpires: Abhijit Deshmukh (India) and Nigel Llong (England)
Player of the match: Rashid Khan (Sunrisers Hyderabad)

- Sunrisers Hyderabad won the toss and elected to field.
- Tejas Baroka (Gujarat Lions) made his T20 debut.

9 April (D/N)
Scorecard

Kolkata Knight Riders; 178/7 (20 overs)	v	Mumbai Indians (H); 180/6 (19.5 overs)
Manish Pandey 81* (47); Krunal Pandya 3/24 (4 overs)		Nitish Rana 50 (29); Ankit Rajpoot 3/37 (4 overs)

Mumbai Indians won by 4 wickets
Wankhede Stadium, Mumbai
Umpires: Nitin Menon (India) and C. K. Nandan (India)
Player of the match: Nitish Rana (Mumbai Indians)

- Mumbai Indians won the toss and elected to field.

10 April (D/N)
Scorecard

Royal Challengers Bangalore; 148/4 (20 overs)	v	Kings XI Punjab (H); 150/2 (14.3 overs)
AB de Villiers 89* (46); Varun Aaron 2/21 (4 overs)		Hashim Amla 58* (38); Tymal Mills 1/22 (2 overs)

Kings XI Punjab won by 8 wickets
Holkar Stadium, Indore
Umpires: Anil Chaudhary (India) and Chettithody Shamshuddin (India)
Player of the match: Axar Patel (Kings XI Punjab)

- Royal Challengers Bangalore won the toss and elected to bat.

11 April (D/N)
Scorecard

Delhi Daredevils; 205/4 (20 overs)	v	Rising Pune Supergiant (H); 108 (16.1 overs)
Sanju Samson 102 (63); Imran Tahir 1/24 (4 overs)		Mayank Agarwal 20 (18); Amit Mishra 3/11 (3 overs)

Delhi Daredevils won by 97 runs
Maharashtra Cricket Association Stadium, Pune
Umpires: Anil Dandekar (India) and Sundaram Ravi (India)
Player of the match: Sanju Samson (Delhi Daredevils)

- Rising Pune Supergiant won the toss and elected to field.
- All 10 RPS batsmen were out caught, the first time this occurred in the IPL

12 April (D/N)
Scorecard

Sunrisers Hyderabad; 158/8 (20 overs)	v	Mumbai Indians (H); 159/6 (18.4 overs)
David Warner 49 (34); Jasprit Bumrah 3/24 (4 overs)		Nitish Rana 45 (36); Bhuvneshwar Kumar 3/21 (4 overs)

Mumbai Indians won by 4 wickets
Wankhede Stadium, Mumbai
Umpires: Nitin Menon (India) and C. K. Nandan (India)
Player of the match: Jasprit Bumrah (Mumbai Indians)

- Mumbai Indians won the toss and elected to field.

13 April (D/N)
Scorecard

Kings XI Punjab; 170/9 (20 overs)	v	Kolkata Knight Riders (H); 171/2 (16.3 overs)
Manan Vohra 28 (19); David Miller 28 (19); Umesh Yadav 4/33 (4 overs)		Gautam Gambhir 72* (49); Varun Aaron 1/23 (2 overs)

Kolkata Knight Riders won by 8 wickets
Eden Gardens, Kolkata
Umpires: Abhijit Deshmukh (India) and Nigel Llong (England)
Player of the match: Sunil Narine (Kolkata Knight Riders)

- Kolkata Knight Riders won the toss and elected to field.

14 April (D/N)
Scorecard

(H) Royal Challengers Bangalore; 142/5 (20 overs)	v	Mumbai Indians; 145/6 (18.5 overs)
Virat Kohli 62 (47); Mitchell McClenaghan 2/20 (4 overs)		Kieron Pollard 70 (47); Samuel Badree 4/9 (4 overs)

Mumbai Indians won by 4 wickets
M. Chinnaswamy Stadium, Bangalore
Umpires: K. N. Ananthapadmanabhan (India) and Anil Chaudhary (India)
Player of the match: Kieron Pollard (Mumbai Indians)

- Mumbai Indians won the toss and elected to field.
- Samuel Badree (Royal Challengers Bangalore) took a hat-trick.

14 April (D/N)
Scorecard

Rising Pune Supergiant; 171/8 (20 overs)	v	Gujarat Lions (H); 172/3 (18 overs)
Steve Smith 43 (28); Andrew Tye 5/17 (4 overs)		Brendon McCullum 49 (32); Shardul Thakur 1/14 (3 overs)

Gujarat Lions won by 7 wickets
Saurashtra Cricket Association Stadium, Rajkot
Umpires: Nand Kishore (India) and Sundaram Ravi (India)
Player of the match: Andrew Tye (Gujarat Lions)

- Gujarat Lions won the toss and elected to field.
- Andrew Tye (Gujarat Lions) took a hat-trick.

15 April (D/N)
Scorecard

(H) Kolkata Knight Riders; 172/6 (20 overs)	v	Sunrisers Hyderabad; 155/6 (20 overs)
Robin Uthappa 68 (39); Bhuvneshwar Kumar 3/20 (4 overs)		Yuvraj Singh 26 (16); Chris Woakes 2/49 (4 overs)

Kolkata Knight Riders won by 17 runs
Eden Gardens, Kolkata
Umpires: Anil Dandekar (India) and Nigel Llong (England)
Player of the match: Robin Uthappa (Kolkata Knight Riders)

- Sunrisers Hyderabad won the toss and elected to field.

15 April
20:00 (D/N)
Scorecard

(H) Delhi Daredevils; 188/6 (20 overs)	v	Kings XI Punjab; 137/9 (20 overs)
Sam Billings 55 (40); Varun Aaron 2/45 (4 overs)		Axar Patel 44 (29); Chris Morris 3/23 (4 overs)

Delhi Daredevils won by 51 runs
Feroz Shah Kotla, Delhi
Umpires: Yeshwant Barde (India) and Nitin Menon (India)
Player of the match: Corey Anderson (Delhi Daredevils)

- Delhi Daredevils won the toss and elected to bat.

16 April
16:00 (D/N)
Scorecard

Gujarat Lions; 176/4 (20 overs)	v	Mumbai Indians (H); 177/4 (19.3 overs)
Brendon McCullum 64 (44); Mitchell McClenaghan 2/24 (4 overs)		Nitish Rana 53 (36); Andrew Tye 2/34 (4 overs)

Mumbai Indians won by 6 wickets
Wankhede Stadium, Mumbai
Umpires: Nand Kishore (India) and Sundaram Ravi (India)
Player of the match: Nitish Rana (Mumbai Indians)

- Mumbai Indians won the toss and elected to field.

16 April
20:00 (D/N)
Scorecard

Rising Pune Supergiant; 161/8 (20 overs)	v	Royal Challengers Bangalore (H); 134/9 (20 overs)
Rahul Tripathi 31 (23); Adam Milne 2/27 (4 overs)		AB de Villiers 29 (30); Ben Stokes 3/18 (4 overs)

Rising Pune Supergiant won by 27 runs
M. Chinnaswamy Stadium, Bangalore
Umpires: K. N. Ananthapadmanabhan (India) and Chettithody Shamshuddin (India)
Player of the match: Ben Stokes (Rising Pune Supergiant)

- Royal Challengers Bangalore won the toss and elected to field.

17 April
16:00 (D/N)
Scorecard

(H) Delhi Daredevils; 168/7 (20 overs)	v	Kolkata Knight Riders; 169/6 (19.5 overs)
Sanju Samson 39 (25); Nathan Coulter-Nile 3/22 (4 overs)		Manish Pandey 69* (49); Zaheer Khan 2/28 (4 overs)

Kolkata Knight Riders won by 4 wickets
Feroz Shah Kotla, Delhi
Umpires: Nitin Menon (India) and C. K. Nandan (India)
Player of the match: Nathan Coulter-Nile (Kolkata Knight Riders)

- Delhi Daredevils won the toss and elected to bat.

17 April
20:00 (D/N)
Scorecard

(H) Sunrisers Hyderabad; 159/6 (20 overs)	v	Kings XI Punjab; 154 (19.4 overs)
David Warner 70* (54); Mohit Sharma 2/25 (4 overs)		Manan Vohra 95 (50); Bhuvneshwar Kumar 5/19 (4 overs)

Sunrisers Hyderabad won by 5 runs
Rajiv Gandhi International Cricket Stadium, Hyderabad
Umpires: Anil Dandekar (India) and Abhijit Deshmukh (India)
Player of the match: Bhuvneshwar Kumar (Sunrisers Hyderabad)

- Kings XI Punjab won the toss and elected to field.

18 April
20:00 (D/N)
Scorecard

Royal Challengers Bangalore; 213/2 (20 overs)	v	Gujarat Lions (H); 192/7 (20 overs)
Chris Gayle 77 (38); Basil Thampi 1/31 (4 overs)		Brendon McCullum 72 (44); Yuzvendra Chahal 3/31 (4 overs)

Royal Challengers Bangalore won by 21 runs
Saurashtra Cricket Association Stadium, Rajkot
Umpires: Sundaram Ravi (India) and Virender Sharma (India)
Player of the match: Chris Gayle (Royal Challengers Bangalore)

- Gujarat Lions won the toss and elected to field.
- Chris Gayle (Royal Challengers Bangalore) became the first player to score 10,000 runs in T20s.

19 April
20:00 (D/N)
Scorecard

(H) Sunrisers Hyderabad; 191/4 (20 overs)	v	Delhi Daredevils; 176/5 (20 overs)
Kane Williamson 89 (51); Chris Morris 4/26 (4 overs)		Shreyas Iyer 50* (31); Mohammed Siraj 2/39 (4 overs)

Sunrisers Hyderabad won by 15 runs
Rajiv Gandhi International Cricket Stadium, Hyderabad
Umpires: Chris Gaffaney (New Zealand) and Nigel Llong (England)
Player of the match: Kane Williamson (Sunrisers Hyderabad)

- Sunrisers Hyderabad won the toss and elected to bat.

20 April
20:00 (D/N)
Scorecard

(H) Kings XI Punjab; 198/4 (20 overs)	v	Mumbai Indians; 199/2 (15.3 overs)
Hashim Amla 104* (60); Mitchell McClenaghan 2/46 (4 overs)		Jos Buttler 77 (37); Marcus Stoinis 1/28 (2 overs)

Mumbai Indians won by 8 wickets
Holkar Stadium, Indore
Umpires: Marais Erasmus (South Africa) and Chettithody Shamshuddin (India)
Player of the match: Jos Buttler (Mumbai Indians)

- Mumbai Indians won the toss and elected to field.
- Hashim Amla (Kings XI Punjab) scored his first century in a T20.

21 April
20:00 (D/N)
Scorecard

(H) Kolkata Knight Riders; 187/5 (20 overs)	v	Gujarat Lions; 188/6 (18.2 overs)
Robin Uthappa 72 (48); Suresh Raina 1/11 (2 overs)		Suresh Raina 84 (46); Kuldeep Yadav 2/33 (4 overs)

Gujarat Lions won by 4 wickets
Eden Gardens, Kolkata
Umpires: Chris Gaffaney (New Zealand) and Nitin Menon (India)
Player of the match: Suresh Raina (Gujarat Lions)

- Gujarat Lions won the toss and elected to field.

22 April
16:00 (D/N)
Scorecard

Sunrisers Hyderabad; 176/3 (20 overs)	v	Rising Pune Supergiant (H); 179/4 (20 overs)
Moises Henriques 55* (28); Daniel Christian 1/20 (4 overs)		MS Dhoni 61* (34); Rashid Khan 1/17 (4 overs)

Rising Pune Supergiant won by 6 wickets
Maharashtra Cricket Association Stadium, Pune
Umpires: Anil Dandekar (India) and Abhijit Deshmukh (India)
Player of the match: MS Dhoni (Rising Pune Supergiant)

- Rising Pune Supergiant won the toss and elected to field.
- Washington Sundar (Rising Pune Supergiant) made his T20 debut.

22 April
20:00 (D/N)
Scorecard

(H) Mumbai Indians; 142/8 (20 overs)	v	Delhi Daredevils; 128/7 (20 overs)
Jos Buttler 28 (18); Amit Mishra 2/18 (4 overs)		Chris Morris 52* (41); Mitchell McClenaghan 3/24 (4 overs)

Mumbai Indians won by 14 runs
Wankhede Stadium, Mumbai
Umpires: Nand Kishore (India) and Sundaram Ravi (India)
Player of the match: Mitchell McClenaghan (Mumbai Indians)

- Delhi Daredevils won the toss and elected to field.

23 April
16:00 (D/N)
Scorecard

Kings XI Punjab; 188/7 (20 overs)	v	Gujarat Lions (H); 162/7 (20 overs)
Hashim Amla 65 (40); Andrew Tye 2/35 (4 overs)		Dinesh Karthik 58* (43); KC Cariappa 2/24 (4 overs)

Kings XI Punjab won by 26 runs
Saurashtra Cricket Association Stadium, Rajkot
Umpires: Anil Chaudhary (India) and Marais Erasmus (South Africa)
Player of the match: Hashim Amla (Kings XI Punjab)

- Gujarat Lions won the toss and elected to field.

23 April
20:00 (D/N)
Scorecard

(H) Kolkata Knight Riders; 131 (19.3 overs)	v	Royal Challengers Bangalore; 49 (9.4 overs)
Sunil Narine 34 (17); Yuzvendra Chahal 3/16 (4 overs)		Kedar Jadhav 9 (7); Colin de Grandhomme 3/4 (1.4 overs)

Kolkata Knight Riders won by 82 runs
Eden Gardens, Kolkata
Umpires: Chris Gaffaney (New Zealand) and C. K. Nandan (India)
Player of the match: Nathan Coulter-Nile (Kolkata Knight Riders)

- Royal Challengers Bangalore won the toss and elected to field.
- Royal Challengers Bangalore's total of 49 was the lowest total in the history of the IPL.
- Royal Challengers Bangalore's innings was also the shortest ever in the IPL and the first instance in the IPL of no batsman making a double-digit score in an innings.

24 April
20:00 (D/N)
Scorecard

Rising Pune Supergiant; 160/6 (20 overs)	v	Mumbai Indians (H); 157/8 (20 overs)
Rahul Tripathi 45 (31); Jasprit Bumrah 2/29 (4 overs)		Rohit Sharma 58 (39); Ben Stokes 2/21 (4 overs)

Rising Pune Supergiant won by 3 runs
Wankhede Stadium, Mumbai
Umpires: Nand Kishore (India) and Sundaram Ravi (India)
Player of the match: Ben Stokes (Rising Pune Supergiant)

- Mumbai Indians won the toss and elected to field.

25 April
20:00 (D/N)
Scorecard

(H) Royal Challengers Bangalore	v	Sunrisers Hyderabad

Match abandoned without a ball bowled
M. Chinnaswamy Stadium, Bangalore
Umpires: Marais Erasmus (South Africa) and Chettithody Shamshuddin (India)

- No toss.
- No play was possible due to rain.

26 April
20:00 (D/N)
Scorecard

(H) Rising Pune Supergiant; 182/5 (20 overs)	v	Kolkata Knight Riders; 184/3 (18.1 overs)
Steve Smith 51* (37); Kuldeep Yadav 2/31 (4 overs)		Robin Uthappa 87 (47); Jaydev Unadkat 1/26 (3 overs)

Kolkata Knight Riders won by 7 wickets
Maharashtra Cricket Association Stadium, Pune
Umpires: Anil Dandekar (India) and Nigel Llong (England)
Player of the match: Robin Uthappa (Kolkata Knight Riders)

- Kolkata Knight Riders won the toss and elected to field.

27 April
20:00 (D/N)
Scorecard

(H) Royal Challengers Bangalore; 134 (20 overs)	v	Gujarat Lions; 135/3 (13.5 overs)
Pawan Negi 32 (19); Andrew Tye 3/12 (4 overs)		Aaron Finch 72 (34); Samuel Badree 2/29 (3 overs)

Gujarat Lions won by 7 wickets
M. Chinnaswamy Stadium, Bangalore
Umpires: Anil Chaudhary (India) and Chettithody Shamshuddin (India)
Player of the match: Andrew Tye (Gujarat Lions)

- Gujarat Lions won the toss and elected to field.
- Ankit Soni (Gujarat Lions) made his T20 debut.

28 April
16:00 (D/N)
Scorecard

Delhi Daredevils; 160/6 (20 overs)	v	Kolkata Knight Riders (H); 161/3 (16.2 overs)
Sanju Samson 60 (38); Nathan Coulter-Nile 3/34 (4 overs)		Gautam Gambhir 71* (52); Kagiso Rabada 2/20 (3.2 overs)

Kolkata Knight Riders won by 7 wickets
Eden Gardens, Kolkata
Umpires: Nigel Llong (England) and Sundaram Ravi (India)
Player of the match: Gautam Gambhir (Kolkata Knight Riders)

- Kolkata Knight Riders won the toss and elected to field.

28 April
20:00 (D/N)
Scorecard

Sunrisers Hyderabad; 207/3 (20 overs)	v	Kings XI Punjab (H); 181/9 (20 overs)
Shikhar Dhawan 77 (48); Glenn Maxwell 2/29 (4 overs)		Shaun Marsh 84 (50); Siddarth Kaul 3/36 (4 overs)

Sunrisers Hyderabad won by 26 runs
Punjab Cricket Association IS Bindra Stadium, Mohali
Umpires: Nitin Menon (India) and C. K. Nandan (India)
Player of the match: Rashid Khan (Sunrisers Hyderabad)

- Kings XI Punjab won the toss and elected to field.

29 April
16:00 (D/N)
Scorecard

(H) Rising Pune Supergiant; 157/3 (20 overs)	v	Royal Challengers Bangalore; 96/9 (20 overs)
Steve Smith 45 (32); Stuart Binny 1/17 (2 overs)		Virat Kohli 55 (48); Imran Tahir 3/18 (4 overs)

Rising Pune Supergiant won by 61 runs
Maharashtra Cricket Association Stadium, Pune
Umpires: K. N. Ananthapadmanabhan (India) and Marais Erasmus (South Africa)
Player of the match: Lockie Ferguson (Rising Pune Supergiant)

- Royal Challengers Bangalore won the toss and elected to field.

29 April
20:00 (D/N)
Scorecard

(H) Gujarat Lions; 153/9 (20 overs)	v	Mumbai Indians; 153 (20 overs)
Ishan Kishan 48 (35); Krunal Pandya 3/14 (4 overs)		Parthiv Patel 70 (44); Basil Thampi 3/29 (4 overs)

Match tied (Mumbai Indians won the super over)
Saurashtra Cricket Association Stadium, Rajkot
Umpires: Anil Chaudhary (India) and Chris Gaffaney (New Zealand)
Player of the match: Krunal Pandya (Mumbai Indians)

- Gujarat Lions won the toss and elected to bat.

30 April
16:00 (D/N)
Scorecard

Delhi Daredevils; 67 (17.1 overs)	v	Kings XI Punjab (H); 68/0 (7.5 overs)
Corey Anderson 18 (25); Sandeep Sharma 4/20 (4 overs)		Martin Guptill 50* (27); Amit Mishra 0/9 (1 over)

Kings XI Punjab won by 10 wickets
Punjab Cricket Association IS Bindra Stadium, Mohali
Umpires: Yeshwant Barde (India) and C. K. Nandan (India)
Player of the match: Sandeep Sharma (Kings XI Punjab)

- Kings XI Punjab won the toss and elected to field.

30 April
20:00 (D/N)
Scorecard

(H) Sunrisers Hyderabad; 209/3 (20 overs)	v	Kolkata Knight Riders; 161/7 (20 overs)
David Warner 126 (59); Chris Woakes 1/46 (4 overs)		Robin Uthappa 53 (28); Siraj, Kaul 2/26 (4 overs)

Sunrisers Hyderabad won by 48 runs
Rajiv Gandhi International Cricket Stadium, Hyderabad
Umpires: Anil Dandekar (India) and Sundaram Ravi (India)
Player of the match: David Warner (Sunrisers Hyderabad)

- Kolkata Knight Riders won the toss and elected to field.

1 May
16:00 (D/N)
Scorecard

Royal Challengers Bangalore; 162/8 (20 overs)	v	Mumbai Indians (H); 165/5 (19.5 overs)
AB de Villiers 43 (27); Mitchell McClenaghan 3/34 (4 overs)		Rohit Sharma 56 (37); Pawan Negi 2/17 (4 overs)

Mumbai Indians won by 5 wickets
Wankhede Stadium, Mumbai
Umpires: Anil Chaudhary (India) and Chris Gaffaney (New Zealand)
Player of the match: Rohit Sharma (Mumbai Indians)

- Royal Challenges Bangalore won the toss and elected to bat.

1 May
20:00 (D/N)
Scorecard

Gujarat Lions; 161 (19.5 overs)	v	Rising Pune Supergiant (H); 167/5 (19.5 overs)
Brendon McCullum 45 (27); Imran Tahir 3/27 (4 overs)		Ben Stokes 103* (63); Basil Thampi 2/35 (4 overs)

Rising Pune Supergiant won by 5 wickets
Maharashtra Cricket Association Stadium, Pune
Umpires: Marais Erasmus (South Africa) and Chettithody Shamshuddin (India)
Player of the match: Ben Stokes (Rising Pune Supergiant)

- Rising Pune Supergiant won the toss and elected to field.
- Ben Stokes (Rising Pune Supergiant) scored his first century in a T20.
- Royal Challengers Bangalore were eliminated as a result of this match.

2 May
20:00 (D/N)
Scorecard

Sunrisers Hyderabad; 185/3 (20 overs)	v	Delhi Daredevils (H); 189/4 (19.1 overs)
Yuvraj Singh 70* (41); Mohammed Shami 2/36 (4 overs)		Corey Anderson 41* (24); Mohammed Siraj 2/41 (4 overs)

Delhi Daredevils won by 6 wickets
Feroz Shah Kotla, Delhi
Umpires: Yeshwant Barde (India) and Nitin Menon (India)
Player of the match: Mohammed Shami (Delhi Daredevils)

- Delhi Daredevils won the toss and elected to field.

3 May
20:00 (D/N)
Scorecard

(H) Kolkata Knight Riders; 155/8 (20 overs)	v	Rising Pune Supergiant; 158/6 (19.2 overs)
Manish Pandey 37 (32); Washington Sundar 2/18 (2 overs)		Rahul Tripathi 93 (52); Chris Woakes 3/18 (4 overs)

Rising Pune Supergiant won by 4 wickets
Eden Gardens, Kolkata
Umpires: K. N. Ananthapadmanabhan (India) and Nand Kishore (India)
Player of the match: Rahul Tripathi (Rising Pune Supergiant)

- Rising Pune Supergiant won the toss and elected to field.

4 May
20:00 (D/N)
Scorecard

Gujarat Lions; 208/7 (20 overs)	v	Delhi Daredevils (H); 214/3 (17.3 overs)
Suresh Raina 77 (43); Kagiso Rabada 2/28 (4 overs)		Rishabh Pant 97 (43); Ravindra Jadeja 1/28 (2 overs)

Delhi Daredevils won by 7 wickets
Feroz Shah Kotla, Delhi
Umpires: Marais Erasmus (South Africa) and Nitin Menon (India)
Player of the match: Rishabh Pant (Delhi Daredevils)

- Delhi Daredevils won the toss and elected to field.
- Gujarat Lions were eliminated as a result of this match.

5 May
20:00 (D/N)
Scorecard

Kings XI Punjab; 138/7 (20 overs)	v	Royal Challengers Bangalore (H); 119 (19 overs)
Axar Patel 38* (17); Aniket Choudhary 2/17 (4 overs)		Mandeep Singh 46 (40); Axar Patel 3/11 (3 overs)

Kings XI Punjab won by 19 runs
M. Chinnaswamy Stadium, Bangalore
Umpires: Chris Gaffaney (New Zealand) and Chettithody Shamshuddin (India)
Player of the match: Sandeep Sharma (Kings XI Punjab)

- Royal Challenges Bangalore won the toss and elected to field.

6 May
16:00 (D/N)
Scorecard

Rising Pune Supergiant; 148/8 (20 overs)	v	Sunrisers Hyderabad (H); 136/9 (20 overs)
Ben Stokes 39 (25); Siddarth Kaul 4/29 (4 overs)		Yuvraj Singh 47 (43); Jaydev Unadkat 5/30 (4 overs)

Rising Pune Supergiant won by 12 runs
Rajiv Gandhi International Cricket Stadium, Hyderabad
Umpires: K. N. Ananthapadmanabhan (India) and Anil Chaudhary (India)
Player of the match: Jaydev Unadkat (Rising Pune Supergiant)

- Sunrisers Hyderabad won the toss and elected to field.
- Jaydev Unadkat (Rising Pune Supergiant) took a hat-trick.

6 May
20:00 (D/N)
Scorecard

Mumbai Indians; 212/3 (20 overs)	v	Delhi Daredevils (H); 66 (13.4 overs)
Lendl Simmons 66 (43); Corey Anderson 1/29 (2 overs)		Karun Nair 21 (15); Karn Sharma 3/11 (3.4 overs)

Mumbai Indians won by 146 runs
Feroz Shah Kotla, Delhi
Umpires: Nitin Menon (India) and C. K. Nandan (India)
Player of the match: Lendl Simmons (Mumbai Indians)

- Delhi Daredevils won the toss and elected to field.
- Mumbai Indians qualified for the playoffs as a result of this match.
- This was the largest winning margin in an IPL match.
- All 10 Delhi Daredevil wickets were out caught

7 May
16:00 (D/N)
Scorecard

(H) Royal Challengers Bangalore; 158/6 (20 overs)	v	Kolkata Knight Riders; 159/4 (15.1 overs)
Travis Head 75* (47); Umesh Yadav 3/36 (4 overs)		Sunil Narine 54 (17); Pawan Negi 2/21 (3.1 overs)

Kolkata Knight Riders won by 6 wickets
M. Chinnaswamy Stadium, Bangalore
Umpires: Anil Dandekar (India) and Chettithody Shamshuddin (India)
Player of the match: Sunil Narine (Kolkata Knight Riders)

- Kolkata Knight Riders won the toss and elected to field.
- Chris Gayle (Royal Challengers Bangalore) played in his 100th IPL match.
- Sunil Narine (Kolkata Knight Riders) made the fastest ever fifty in the IPL (15 balls).
- Kolkata Knight Riders recorded the highest team total in the powerplay (105-0).

7 May
20:00 (D/N)
Scorecard

(H) Kings XI Punjab; 189/3 (20 overs)	v	Gujarat Lions; 192/4 (19.4 overs)
Hashim Amla 104 (60); Dhawal Kulkarni 1/24 (4 overs)		Dwayne Smith 74 (39); Sandeep Sharma 2/29 (4 overs)

Gujarat Lions won by 6 wickets
Punjab Cricket Association IS Bindra Stadium, Mohali
Umpires: Nand Kishore (India) and Virender Sharma (India)
Player of the match: Dwayne Smith (Gujarat Lions)

- Gujarat Lions won the toss and elected to field.

8 May
20:00 (D/N)
Scorecard

Mumbai Indians; 138/7 (20 overs)	v	Sunrisers Hyderabad (H); 140/3 (18.2 overs)
Rohit Sharma 67 (45); Siddarth Kaul 3/24 (4 overs)		Shikhar Dhawan 62* (46); Jasprit Bumrah 1/24 (3.2 overs)

Sunrisers Hyderabad won by 7 wickets
Rajiv Gandhi International Cricket Stadium, Hyderabad
Umpires: K. N. Ananthapadmanabhan (India) (India) and Marais Erasmus (South Africa)
Player of the match: Shikhar Dhawan (Sunrisers Hyderabad)

- Mumbai Indians won the toss and elected to bat.
- Delhi Daredevils were eliminated as a result of this match.

9 May
20:00 (D/N)
Scorecard

(H) Kings XI Punjab; 167/6 (20 overs)	v	Kolkata Knight Riders; 153/6 (20 overs)
Glenn Maxwell 44 (25); Chris Woakes 2/20 (4 overs)		Chris Lynn 84 (52); Rahul Tewatia 2/18 (4 overs)

Kings XI Punjab won by 14 runs
Punjab Cricket Association IS Bindra Stadium, Mohali
Umpires: Nand Kishore (India) and Sundaram Ravi (India)
Player of the match: Mohit Sharma (Kings XI Punjab)

- Kolkata Knight Riders won the toss and elected to field.

10 May
20:00 (D/N)
Scorecard

(H) Gujarat Lions; 195/5 (20 overs)	v	Delhi Daredevils; 197/8 (19.4 overs)
Aaron Finch 69 (39); Amit Mishra 1/27 (2 overs)		Shreyas Iyer 96 (57); James Faulkner 2/39 (4 overs)

Delhi Daredevils won by 2 wickets
Green Park Stadium, Kanpur
Umpires: Yeshwant Barde (India) and Anil Chaudhary (India)
Player of the match: Shreyas Iyer (Delhi Daredevils)

- Delhi Daredevils won the toss and elected to field.

11 May
20:00 (D/N)
Scorecard

Kings XI Punjab; 230/3 (20 overs)	v	Mumbai Indians (H); 223/6 (20 overs)
Wriddhiman Saha 93* (55); Jasprit Bumrah 1/24 (4 overs)		Lendl Simmons 59 (32); Mohit Sharma 2/57 (4 overs)

Kings XI Punjab won by 7 runs
Wankhede Stadium, Mumbai
Umpires: Abhijit Deshmukh (India) and Nand Kishore (India)
Player of the match: Wriddhiman Saha (Kings XI Punjab)

- Mumbai Indians won the toss and elected to field.

12 May
20:00 (D/N)
Scorecard

(H) Delhi Daredevils; 168/8 (20 overs)	v	Rising Pune Supergiant; 161/7 (20 overs)
Karun Nair 64 (45); Jaydev Unadkat 2/29 (4 overs)		Manoj Tiwary 60 (45); Zaheer Khan 2/25 (4 overs)

Delhi Daredevils won by 7 runs
Feroz Shah Kotla, Delhi
Umpires: K. N. Ananthapadmanabhan (India) and C. K. Nandan (India)
Player of the match: Karun Nair (Delhi Daredevils)

- Delhi Daredevils won the toss and elected to bat.

13 May
16:00 (D/N)
Scorecard

(H) Gujarat Lions; 154 (19.2 overs)	v	Sunrisers Hyderabad; 158/2 (18.1 overs)
Ishan Kishan 61 (40); Mohammed Siraj 4/32 (4 overs)		David Warner 69 (52)*; Praveen Kumar 2/22 (4 overs)

Sunrisers Hyderabad won by 8 wickets
Green Park Stadium, Kanpur
Umpires: Anil Chaudhary (India) and Nitin Menon (India)
Player of the match: Mohammed Siraj (Sunrisers Hyderabad)

- Sunrisers Hyderabad won the toss and elected to field.
- Sunrisers Hyderabad qualified for the playoffs as a result of this match.

13 May
20:00 (D/N)
Scorecard

Mumbai Indians; 173/5 (20 overs)	v	Kolkata Knight Riders (H); 164/8 (20 overs)
Ambati Rayudu 63 (37); Trent Boult 2/30 (4 overs)		Manish Pandey 33 (33); Hardik Pandya 2/22 (4 overs)

Mumbai Indians won by 9 runs
Eden Gardens, Kolkata
Umpires: Nand Kishore (India) and Sundaram Ravi (India)
Player of the match: Ambati Rayudu (Mumbai Indians)

- Kolkata Knight Riders won the toss and elected to field.
- Mumbai Indians advanced to Qualifier 1 as a result of this match.

14 May
16:00 (D/N)
Scorecard

Kings XI Punjab; 73 (15.5 overs)	v	Rising Pune Supergiant (H); 78/1 (12 overs)
Axar Patel 22 (20); Shardul Thakur 3/19 (4 overs)		Ajinkya Rahane 34* (34); Axar Patel 1/13 (2 overs)

Rising Pune Supergiant won by 9 wickets
Maharashtra Cricket Association Stadium, Pune
Umpires: Anil Dandekar (India) and Abhijit Deshmukh (India)
Player of the match: Jaydev Unadkat (Rising Pune Supergiant)

- Rising Pune Supergiant won the toss and elected to field.
- Kolkata Knight Riders and Rising Pune Supergiant qualified for the playoffs, Rising Pune Supergiant advanced to Qualifier 1 and Kings XI Punjab were eliminated as a result of this match.

14 May
20:00 (D/N)
Scorecard

Royal Challengers Bangalore; 161/6 (20 overs)	v	Delhi Daredevils (H); 151 (20 overs)
Virat Kohli 58 (45); Pat Cummins 2/21 (4 overs)		Rishabh Pant 45 (34); Pawan Negi 3/10 (2 overs)

Royal Challengers Bangalore won by 10 runs
Feroz Shah Kotla, Delhi
Umpires: C. K. Nandan (India) and Chettithody Shamshuddin (India)
Player of the match: Harshal Patel (Royal Challengers Bangalore)

- Royal Challengers Bangalore won the toss and elected to bat.
- Avesh Khan (Royal Challengers Bangalore) made his T20 debut.

== Playoffs ==
Qualifier 1 / Eliminator
16 May — Mumbai
1	Mumbai Indians	142/9 (20 ov)
2	Rising Pune Supergiant	162/4 (20 ov)
17 May — Bangalore
3	Sunrisers Hyderabad	128/7 (20 ov)
4	Kolkata Knight Riders	48/3 (5.2 ov)

Qualifier 2
19 May — Bangalore
Q1L	Mumbai Indians	111/4 (14.3 ov)
EW	Kolkata Knight Riders	107 (18.5 ov)

Final
21 May — Hyderabad
Q1W	Rising Pune Supergiant	128/6 (20 ov)
Q2W	Mumbai Indians	129/8 (20 ov)

=== Qualifier 1 ===
16 May
20:00 (D/N)
Scorecard

Rising Pune Supergiant; 162/4 (20 overs)	v	Mumbai Indians; 142/9 (20 overs)
Manoj Tiwary 58 (48); Lasith Malinga 1/14 (3 overs)		Parthiv Patel 52 (40); Washington Sundar 3/16 (4 overs)

Rising Pune Supergiant won by 20 runs
Wankhede Stadium, Mumbai
Umpires: Sundaram Ravi (India) and Chettithody Shamshuddin (India)
Player of the match: Washington Sundar (Rising Pune Supergiant)

- Mumbai Indians won the toss and elected to field.

=== Eliminator ===
17 May
20:00 (D/N)
Scorecard

Sunrisers Hyderabad; 128/7 (20 overs)	v	Kolkata Knight Riders; 48/3 (5.2 overs)
David Warner 37 (35); Nathan Coulter-Nile 3/20 (4 overs)		Gautam Gambhir 32* (19); Chris Jordan 1/9 (1 over)

Kolkata Knight Riders won by 7 wickets (DLS method)
M. Chinnaswamy Stadium, Bangalore
Umpires: Anil Chaudhary (India) and Nitin Menon (India)
Player of the match: Nathan Coulter-Nile (Kolkata Knight Riders)

- Kolkata Knight Riders won the toss and elected to field.
- Rain interrupted play during the innings break with Kolkata Knight Riders set a target of 48 runs from 6 overs.

=== Qualifier 2 ===
19 May
20:00 (D/N)
Scorecard

Kolkata Knight Riders; 107 (18.5 overs)	v	Mumbai Indians; 111/4 (14.3 overs)
Suryakumar Yadav 31 (25); Karn Sharma 4/16 (4 overs)		Krunal Pandya 45* (30); Piyush Chawla 2/34 (4 overs)

Mumbai Indians won by 6 wickets
M. Chinnaswamy Stadium, Bengaluru
Umpires: Nigel Llong (England) and Nitin Menon (India)
Player of the match: Karn Sharma (Mumbai Indians)

- Mumbai Indians won the toss and elected to field.

=== Final ===
21 May
20:00 (D/N)
Scorecard

Mumbai Indians; 129/8 (20 overs)	v	Rising Pune Supergiant; 128/6 (20 overs)
Krunal Pandya 47 (38); Jaydev Unadkat 2/19 (4 overs)		Steve Smith 51 (50); Mitchell Johnson 3/26 (4 overs)

Mumbai Indians won by 1 run
Rajiv Gandhi International Cricket Stadium, Hyderabad
Umpires: Nigel Llong (England) and Sundaram Ravi (India)
Player of the match: Krunal Pandya (Mumbai Indians)

- Mumbai Indians won the toss and elected to bat.

== Statistics ==
=== Most runs ===
Player	Team	Mat	Inns	Runs	HS
David Warner	Sunrisers Hyderabad	14	14	641	126
Gautam Gambhir	Kolkata Knight Riders	16	16	498	76 not out
Shikhar Dhawan	Sunrisers Hyderabad	14	14	479	77
Steve Smith	Rising Pune Supergiant	15	15	472	84 not out
Suresh Raina	Gujarat Lions	14	14	442	84

- David Warner of Sunrisers Hyderabad received the Orange Cap.
- Source: ESPNcricinfo

=== Most wickets ===
Player	Team	Mat	Inns	Wkts	BBI
Bhuvneshwar Kumar	Sunrisers Hyderabad	14	14	26	5/19
Jaydev Unadkat	Rising Pune Supergiant	12	12	24	5/30
Jasprit Bumrah	Mumbai Indians	16	16	20	3/7
Mitchell McClenaghan	Mumbai Indians	14	14	19	3/24
Imran Tahir	Rising Pune Supergiant	12	12	18	3/18

- Bhuvneshwar Kumar of Sunrisers Hyderabad received the Purple Cap.
- Source: ESPNcricinfo

=== Awards ===
Player	Team	Award	Value
Glenn Maxwell	Kings XI Punjab	Most sixes	₹10 lakh (US$10,000)
Ben Stokes	Rising Pune Supergiant	Most Valuable Player	₹10 lakh (US$10,000)
Basil Thampi	Gujarat Lions	Emerging player	₹10 lakh (US$10,000)
Suresh Raina	Gujarat Lions	Best catch	₹10 lakh (US$10,000) and a phone
Sunil Narine	Kolkata Knight Riders	Fastest fifty	₹10 lakh (US$10,000)
Yuvraj Singh	Sunrisers Hyderabad	Best shot	₹10 lakh (US$10,000) and a car
Gautam Gambhir	Kolkata Knight Riders	Stylish player	₹10 lakh (US$10,000)
	Gujarat Lions	Fairplay Award	Team trophy

== See also ==
- List of Indian Premier League records and statistics
