= Karn Sharma =

Indian cricketer (born 1987)

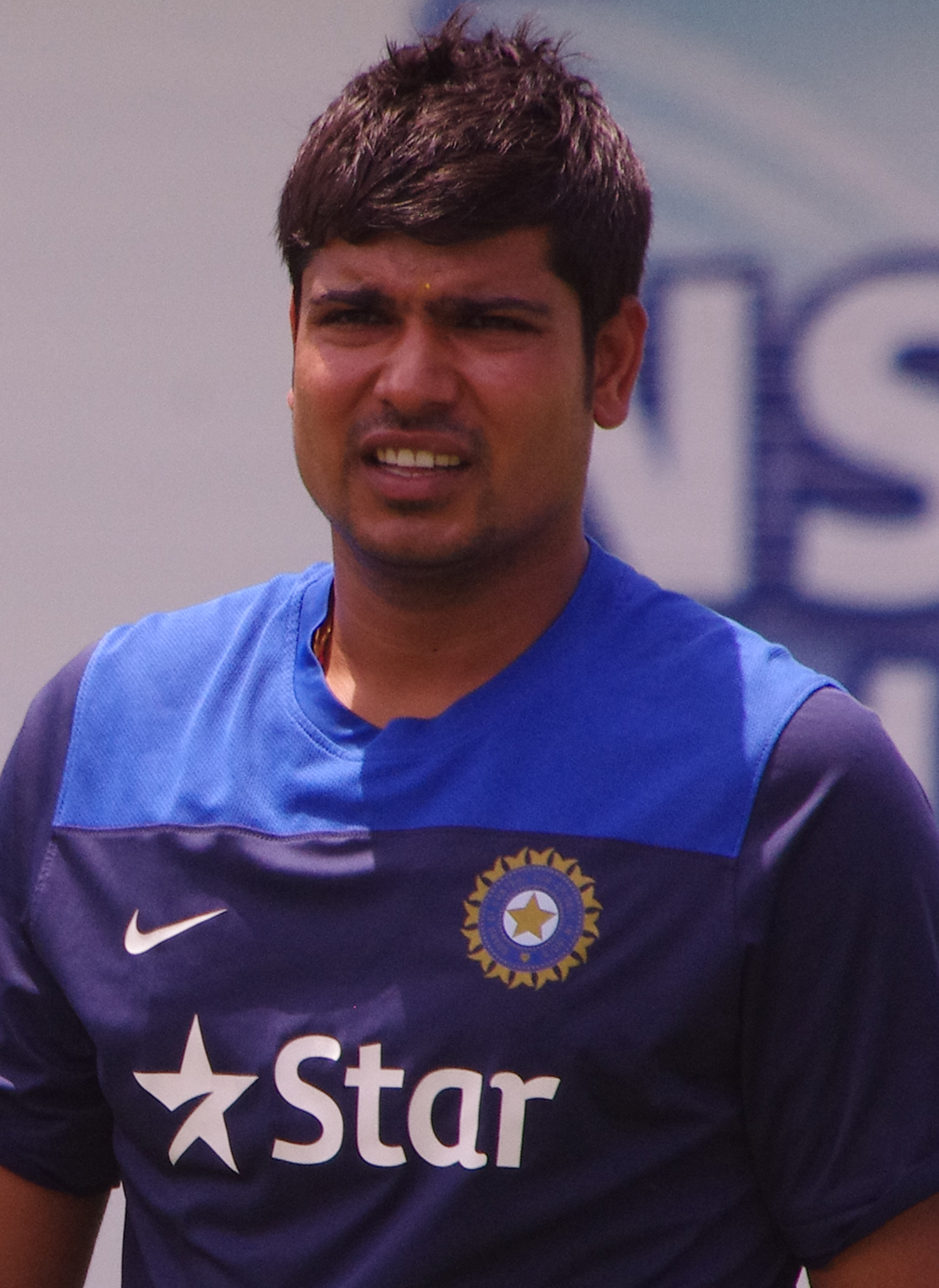

Personal information
- Full name: Karn Vinod Sharma
- Born: 23 October 1987 (age 39); Meerut, Uttar Pradesh, India
- Batting: Left-handed
- Bowling: Right arm leg break googly
- Role: All-rounder

International information
- National side: India (2014)
- Only Test (cap 283): 9 December 2014 v Australia
- ODI debut (cap 204): 13 November 2014 v Sri Lanka
- Last ODI: 16 November 2014 v Sri Lanka
- ODI shirt no.: 33
- Only T20I (cap 49): 7 September 2014 v England

Domestic team information
- Years: Team
- 2007–2017, 2019–present: Railways
- 2009, 2023-2024: Royal Challengers Bengaluru
- 2013–2016: Sunrisers Hyderabad (squad no. 33)
- 2017, 2025: Mumbai Indians (squad no. 12)
- 2018–2021: Chennai Super Kings (squad no. 36)
- 2017: Vidarbha
- 2018–2019: Andhra

Career statistics
Competition	Test	ODI	T20I	FC
Matches	1	2	1	91
Runs scored	8	–	–	2,742
Batting average	8.00	–	–	23.43
100s/50s	0/0	–	–	2/16
Top score	4*	–	–	120
Balls bowled	294	114	24	12,816
Wickets	4	0	1	257
Bowling average	59.50	–	28.00	27.15
5 wickets in innings	0	–	0	13
10 wickets in match	0	–	0	2
Best bowling	2/95	–	1/28	8/38
Catches/stumpings	0/–	3/–	0/–	34/–
- Source: ESPNcricinfo, 12 April 2025

Karn Vinod Sharma (born 23 October 1987) is an Indian former cricketer who played as an all-rounder for the Railways cricket team. He is a left-hand batsman and leg break bowler. He made his Twenty20 International debut against England in 2014. He made his One Day International debut for India against Sri Lanka on 13 November 2014. He made his Test debut against Australia in Adelaide on 9 December 2014.

== Domestic career ==
He made his first-class debut in 2007/08 Ranji season at Karnail Singh Stadium against Jammu and Kashmir, where he played as a specialist batsman. He scored 120 off 232 balls with 17 boundaries as Railways cricket team won by innings and 88 runs.

In July 2018, he was named in the squad for India Green for the 2018–19 Duleep Trophy. He was the leading wicket-taker for Andhra in the 2018–19 Vijay Hazare Trophy, with twelve dismissals in eight matches.

== International career ==
=== T20I career ===
Karn Sharma made his T20I debut on 7 September 2014 against England.

=== ODI career ===
Karn Sharma made his ODI debut on 13 November 2014 against Sri Lanka. Sadly he had a terrible outing with the ball on debut and he didn't get a chance to bat for the team.

=== Test career ===
Karn Sharma made his Test debut on 9 December 2014 against Australia within a month of his ODI debut. He picked up 4 Wickets in 2 innings and dismissed his IPL teammate David Warner twice in the match. However he managed to score only 8 runs from 2 innings.

== Indian Premier League ==
He featured for Royal Challengers Bangalore in 2009.

He was signed up by the IPL franchise Sunrisers Hyderabad in 2013. In a line-up comprising Dale Steyn, Thisara Perera and Amit Mishra, young Sharma was the bowler the opposition batsmen were expected to target.

He responded with a mature performance. His performance against Kings XI Punjab early on in the tournament was ample proof of his potential, as he beat the Kings XI batsmen with his spin.

He fortified a bowling attack with a decent economy rate and was a foil to Amit Mishra, the senior leg spinner in the side. He also contributed with the bat scoring a 39 when Sunrisers Hyderabad was staring at their first home defeat against Chennai Super Kings.

In 2014 IPL auctions, he was bought by Sunrisers Hyderabad for Rs 3.75 crore, in a bidding war with Kings XI Punjab. He was the highest paid uncapped Indian player in IPL 2014.

In 2015, he was retained by the Sunrisers Hyderabad and he plays as the lead spin bowler for the team. After being retained in the team for the 2016 season, he won the 2016 Indian Premier League with Sunrisers Hyderabad.

In February 2017, he was bought by the Mumbai Indians team for the 2017 Indian Premier League for 3.2 crores. He won the 2017 Indian Premier League with Mumbai Indians, he bowled a valuable spell by giving away only 18 runs in 4 overs in the final, he also bowled 12 dot balls in the match.

In January 2018, he was bought by the Chennai Super Kings for ₹5 crores in the 2018 IPL auction and subsequently went on to win the title that year and held the unique record for winning IPL title three years in row with 3 different teams. In February 2022, he was bought by the Royal Challengers Bangalore in the auction for the 2022 Indian Premier League tournament. He went unsold in the 2026 IPL auction. On 23 August 2026, Karn Sharma announced his retirement from Indian and Domestic Cricket.
