= Rajiv Gandhi International Cricket Stadium =

Cricket stadium in Hyderabad, India

- Uppal Stadium
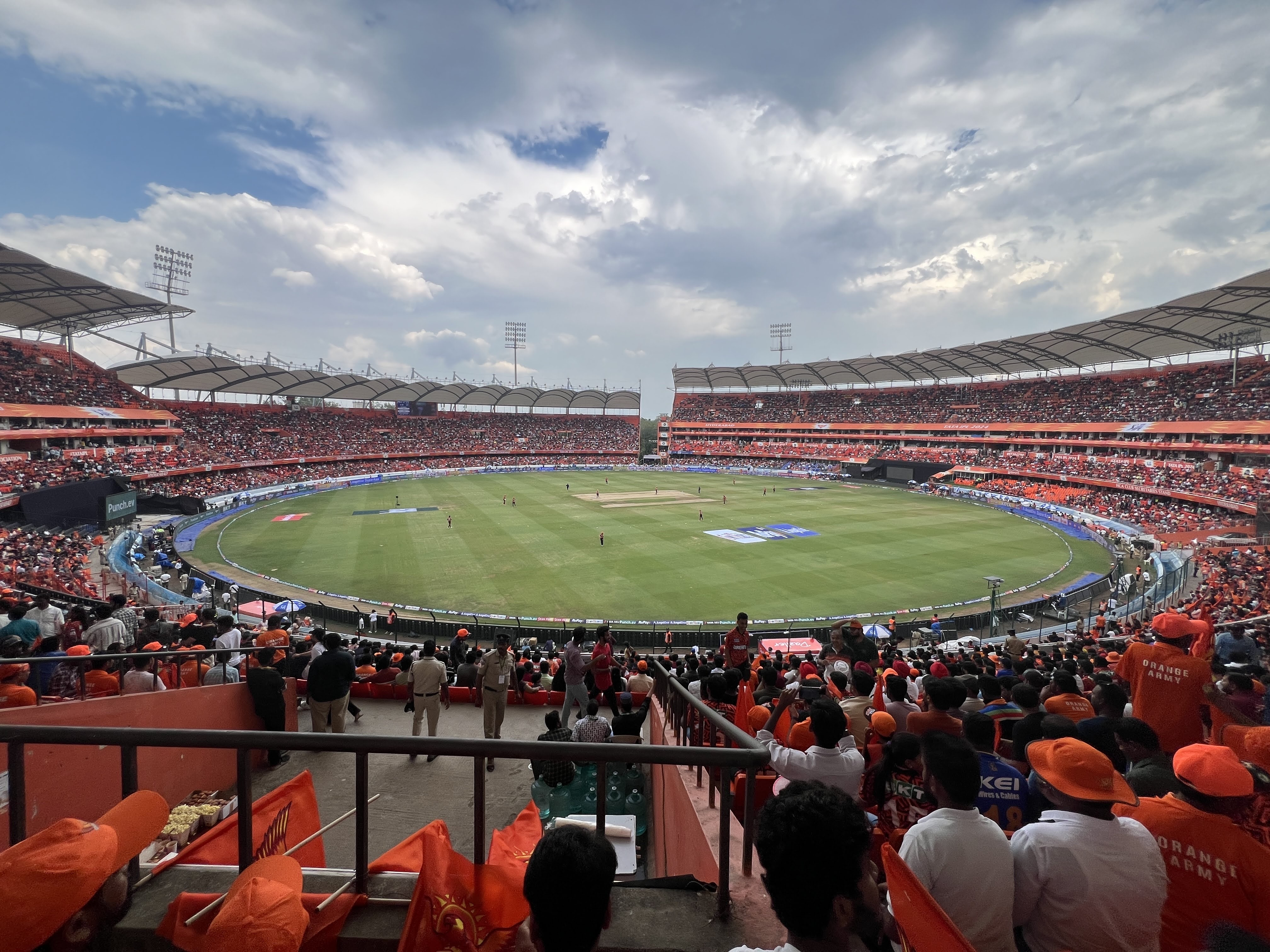
- Rajiv Gandhi International Cricket Stadium, Hyderabad, Telangana
- Interactive map of Rajiv Gandhi International Cricket Stadium

Ground information
- Location: Uppal, Hyderabad, Telangana, India
- Coordinates: 17°24′23″N 78°33′01″E
- Establishment: 2003; 23 years ago
- Capacity: 55,000 design; 39,200 match capacity
- Owner: Hyderabad Cricket Association (HCA)
- Architect: Shashi Prabhu
- Operator: HCA
- Tenants: India cricket team (2005–present); Deccan Chargers (2008-2012); Sunrisers Hyderabad (2013–present)
- End names
- North end Pavellion end

International information
- First men's Test: 12–16 November 2010: India v New Zealand
- Last men's Test: 25–28 January 2024: India v England
- First men's ODI: 16 November 2005: India v South Africa
- Last men's ODI: 10 October 2023: Pakistan v Sri Lanka
- First men's T20I: 6 December 2019: India v West Indies
- Last men's T20I: 14 October 2026: India v West Indies
- As of 14 October 2026; Source: ESPNcricinfo

The Rajiv Gandhi International Cricket Stadium, commonly known as Uppal Stadium, is an international cricket stadium in Hyderabad, Telangana, India. It is owned and operated by Hyderabad Cricket Association (HCA). It is the home ground of Hyderabad cricket team and Hyderabad women's cricket team.

Located in the eastern suburb of Uppal, it has a seating capacity of 55,000 and extends across 15 acres of land. It serves as the home ground for the IPL team Sunrisers Hyderabad. As of 13 October 2024, it has hosted 6 Tests, 10 ODIs, and 3 T20Is. The stadium hosted the final of 2017 IPL and the final of the 2019 IPL. The stadium hosted its first ICC event in October 2023 during the 2023 Cricket World Cup.

It is renamed after the former prime minister of India Rajiv Gandhi.

== History ==
=== Previous Stadium ===
Prior to the construction of the stadium, the Lal Bahadur Shastri Stadium in the Fateh Maidan sports complex at Basheerbagh in central Hyderabad was used to host domestic and international cricket matches in Hyderabad. Between 1955 and 2003 the stadium hosted 3 test matches and 14 One Day Internationals.

=== Construction ===
Before the stadium was built, HCA hosted domestic and international matches at the Lal Bahadur Shastri Stadium. The ground's proprietor was the Sports Authority of Andhra Pradesh state (Now Sports Authority of Telangana State) due to which HCA had limited authority and control over the ground, due to which it decided to build their own stadium. In 2003, the proposal for a new stadium was submitted by HCA to the government of erstwhile Andhra Pradesh, then headed by N. Chandrababu Naidu. The proposal was quickly cleared and HCA was allocated a budget for the same. The government also identified a large piece of land suitable for the project at Uppal.

=== Naming ===
Most of the funding for the project came after an open auction of the stadium's title was held. Visaka Industries Limited won the auction with a bid price of ₹65,00,00,000. A sum of ₹43,00,00,000 was paid in advance and the stadium was named "Visakha International Cricket Stadium" in 2004.

By 2005 when most of the stadium was built, it was ready to host its first ODI Match between India and South Africa. However, Y. S. Rajasekhara Reddy the former Chief Minister of Andhra Pradesh (before the separation of Telangana) decided to change the name of the stadium to Rajiv Gandhi International Cricket Stadium in memory of the former Prime Minister of India Rajiv Gandhi.

Following this decision, HCA was required to pay Visakha Industries six times the contract price in accordance with the contract clauses governing any subsequent renaming of the stadium or the Visakha name not remaining attached to the stadium. HCA however, following some negotiations by Govt, got away with paying an amount of ₹43,00,00,000, i.e. the contract price only.

The ends are named Pavilion End and North End. On the retirement of VVS Laxman, the HCA decided to honor the veteran by naming the North End after him.

=== Renovations ===
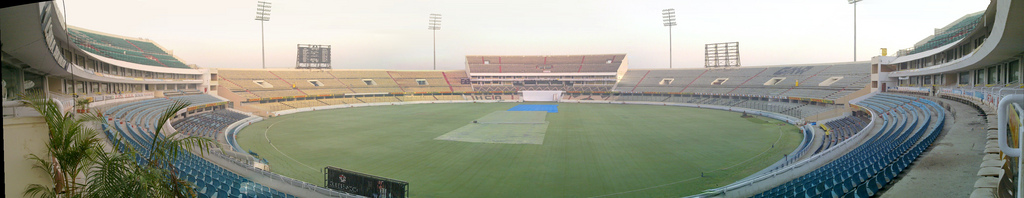
The Stadium before renovations in 2015.

Following the opening of the stadium in 2003 the stadium went under numerous minor upgrades. Floodlights were installed in 2008 while canopies were installed for the southern and northern stands in 2013. However, the stadium underwent its first major renovation ahead of the 2023 world cup.

Prior to the start of the 2023 Cricket World Cup, BCCI selected the stadium to undergo renovations. The board sanctioned ₹120 crore (US$12 million) for the renovations, which were to be undertaken by the HCA and the BCCI. The renovation works included the installations of new canopy on the west and east stand. Parts of the southern stand canopy which were blow away by a strong gale in 2019 were replaced as well. The renovation saw the replacement of over 10,000 seats, installation of new screens, replacement of the existing floodlights with new LED floodlights, and other renovation to improve viewer amenities.

Prior to the start of the 2025 Indian Premier League Sunrisers Hyderabad provided ₹5 crore (US$520,000) for further renovations to the stadium. The sum was spent to improve seating, dressing rooms, washrooms, and various other amenities.

== Domestic cricket ==
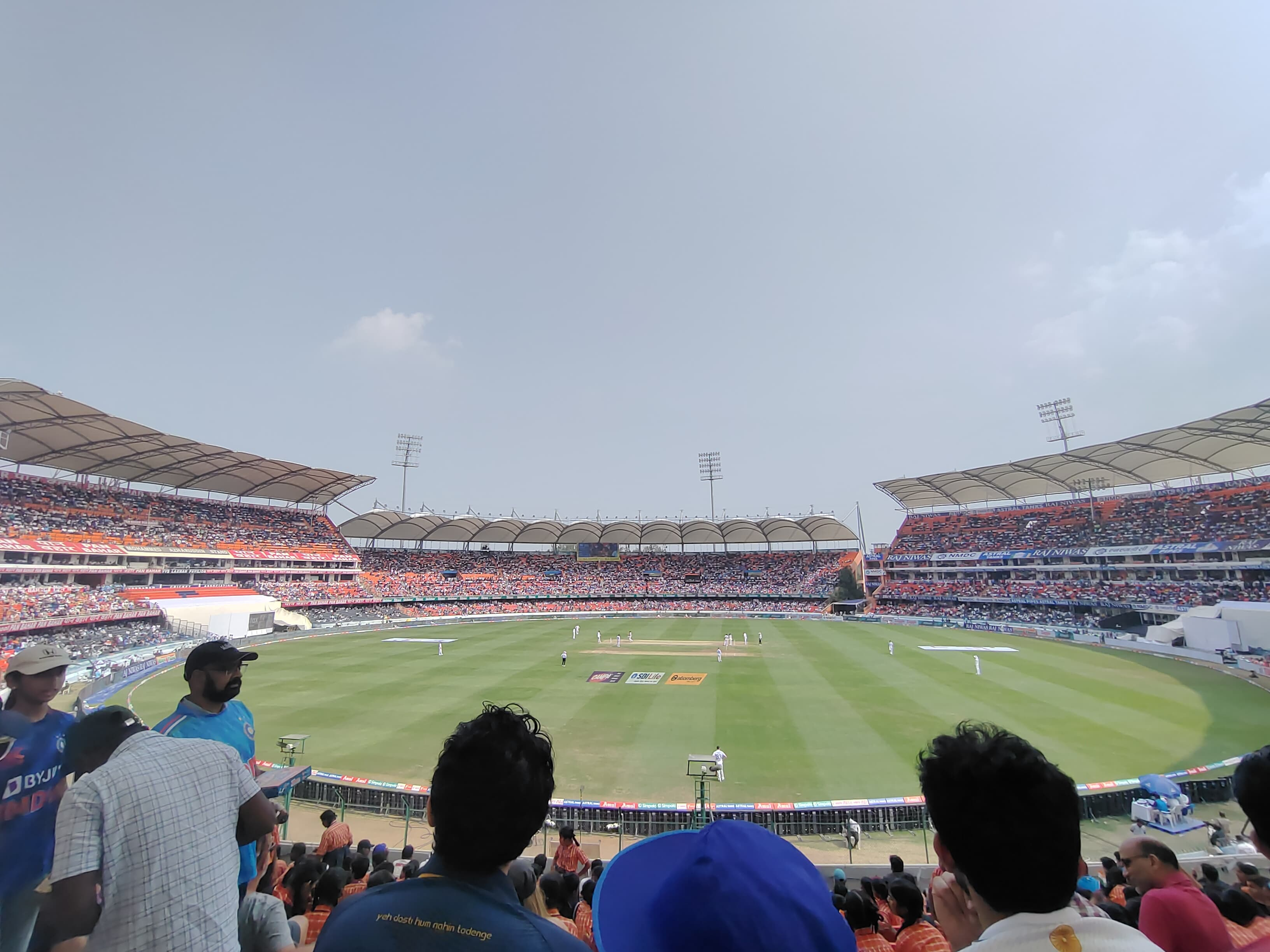
The Stadium after renovations in 2024.

Sunrisers Hyderabad, also known as SRH, is a cricket franchise based in Hyderabad city. The team is owned by Kalanithi Maran of the Sun TV Network. Pat Cummins is the captain of the team and Daniel Vettori is the head coach. The team won the 2016 IPL. So far this stadium has served as the home ground of the Sunrisers and the defunct franchise Deccan Chargers.

In IPL 2019, Hyderabad Cricket Association won the award for best ground and pitch.

In IPL 2024, SRH have recorded their highest team total (277/3) against MI and the highest team total in IPL history at this ground which was later broken by the same team against RCB at Bangalore after a fortnight. Following the conclusion of IPL 2024, Hyderabad Cricket Association won the award for best ground and pitch.

== Records and Statistics ==
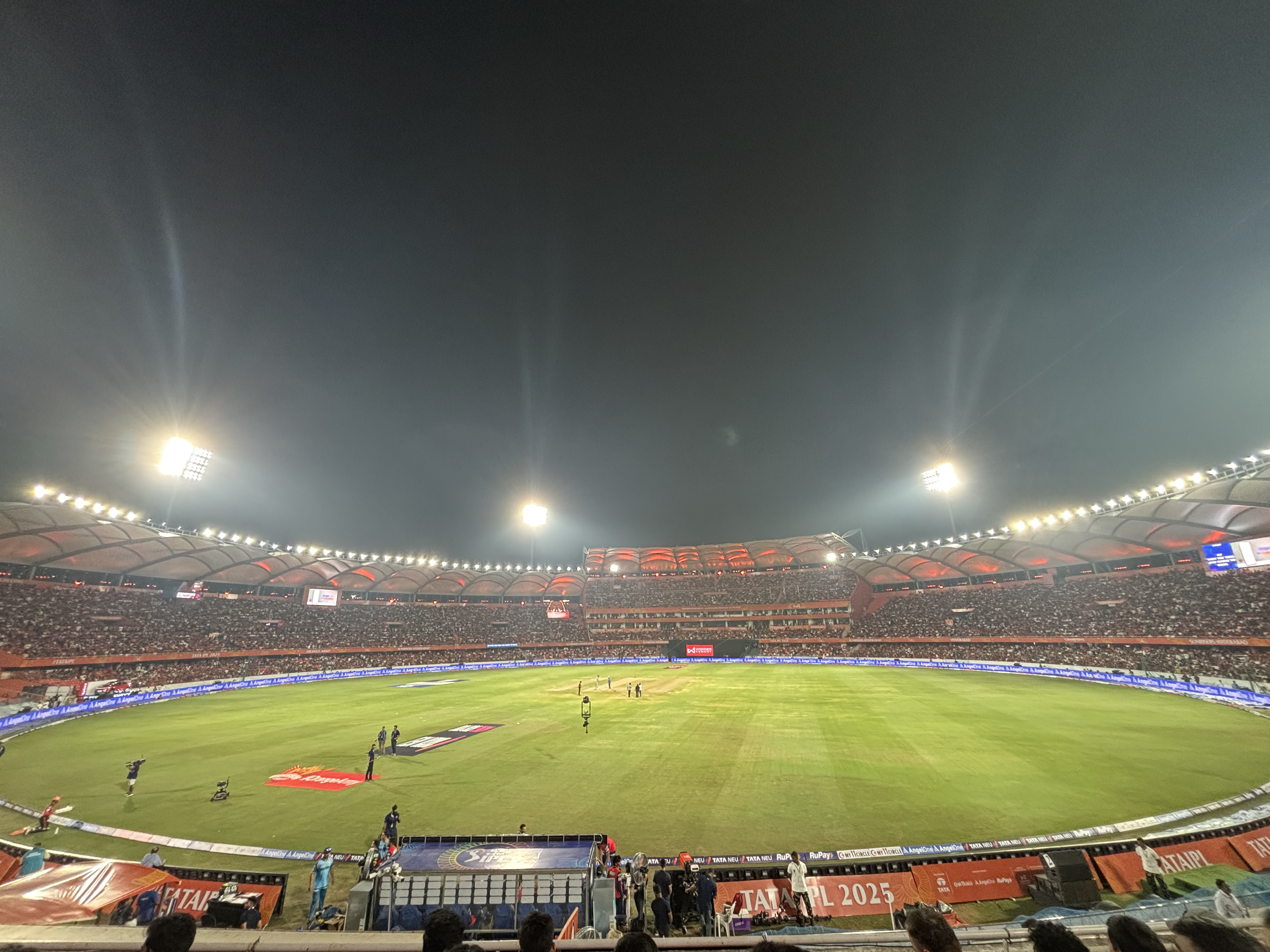
The Stadium during a night time match of the 2025 IPL.

=== Test records ===
- Highest total in the stadium: 687/6d by India against Bangladesh on 9 February 2017
- Lowest total in the stadium: 68/0 by India against New Zealand on 9 February 2017

=== ODI records ===
- Highest total in the stadium: 350/4 by Australia against India on 05 November 2009
- Lowest total in the stadium: 175/10 by England against India on 14 October 2011

=== T20I records ===
- Highest total in the stadium: 297/6 by India against Bangladesh on 12 October 2024
- Lowest total in the stadium: 164/7 by Bangladesh against India on 12 October 2024

=== IPL records ===
- Highest total in the stadium: 277/3 by Sunrisers Hyderabad against Mumbai Indians on 27 March 2024
- Lowest total in the stadium: 80/10 by Delhi Daredevils against Sunrisers Hyderabad on 04 May 2013
- Best Bowling Figures in IPL history: 6/12 by Alzarri Joseph, Mumbai Indians against Sunrisers Hyderabad on 6 April 2019
  Alzarri Joseph's bowling figures of 6 for 12 are the best recorded in any IPL match.

== See also ==
- List of stadiums in India
- List of cricket grounds by capacity
- List of cricket grounds in India
- List of international cricket grounds in India
- Cricket in India
