= Jaydev Unadkat =

Indian cricketer (born 1991)

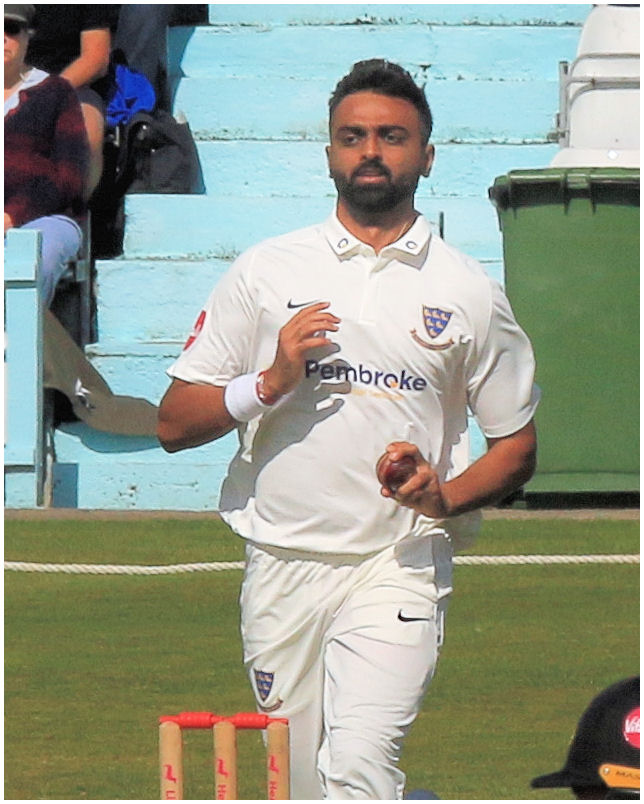
- Unadkat playing for Sussex in 2024

Personal information
- Full name: Jaydev Dipakbhai Unadkat
- Born: 18 October 1991 (age 35); Porbandar, Gujarat, India
- Height: 6 ft 3 in (191 cm)
- Batting: Right-handed
- Bowling: Left-arm medium
- Role: Bowler

International information
- National side: India (2010–2023)
- Test debut (cap 267): 16 December 2010 v South Africa
- Last Test: 20 July 2023 v West Indies
- ODI debut (cap 197): 24 July 2013 v Zimbabwe
- Last ODI: 1 August 2023 v West Indies
- ODI shirt no.: 91 (formerly 77)
- T20I debut (cap 64): 18 June 2016 v Zimbabwe
- Last T20I: 18 March 2018 v Bangladesh
- T20I shirt no.: 77

Domestic team information
- Years: Team
- 2010–present: Saurashtra
- 2010–2012, 2016: Kolkata Knight Riders
- 2013: Royal Challengers Bangalore
- 2014–2015: Delhi Daredevils
- 2017: Rising Pune Supergiants
- 2018–2021: Rajasthan Royals
- 2022: Mumbai Indians
- 2023: Lucknow Super Giants
- 2023–present: Sussex
- 2024–present: Sunrisers Hyderabad

Career statistics
Competition	Test	ODI	T20I	FC
Matches	4	8	10	144
Runs scored	36	0	0	2,263
Batting average	12.00	–	–	16.16
100s/50s	0/0	0/0	0/0	0/8
Top score	14*	–	–	92
Balls bowled	474	342	208	23,677
Wickets	3	9	14	511
Bowling average	77.00	25.00	21.50	22.92
5 wickets in innings	0	0	0	25
10 wickets in match	0	–	–	5
Best bowling	2/42	4/41	3/38	8/39
Catches/stumpings	3/–	1/–	3/–	60/–
Medal record
Men's Cricket
Representing India
ICC World Test Championship
Runner-up	2021–2023
- Source: ESPNcricinfo, 26 September 2026

Jaydev Dipakbhai Unadkat (born 18 October 1991) is an Indian professional cricketer who has played for the Indian national team. He plays for Saurashtra and Sussex in domestic cricket and for Sunrisers Hyderabad in the Indian Premier League. He represented India in the Under-19 Cricket World Cup in 2010. In March 2020, Unadkat became the first player to have captained Saurashtra to the Ranji Trophy title. In December 2022, Unadkat returned to the Test XI after 12 years.

== Domestic career ==
Domestically Unadkat plays for Saurashtra. He has played for a number of teams in the Indian Premier League. When he was selected by Royal Challengers Bangalore in 2013 he was one of the costliest Indian players. In May 2013 he achieved his best T20 career bowling figures of 5/25 playing against Delhi Daredevils and was named Player of the Match.

In 2014, he was selected by Delhi in that year's IPL auction, and in February 2016 Kolkata Knight Riders made the winning bid in that auction, ₹160 lakh (US$170,000), to secure Unadkat's services. In February 2017, he moved again, this time to Rising Pune Supergiants. In the 10th IPL he took a hat-trick against Sunrisers Hyderabad during the final over of the match which was a wicket maiden over.

In July 2018, he was named in the squad for India Blue for the 2018–19 Duleep Trophy and in October 2018 was named in India B's squad for the 2018–19 Deodhar Trophy.

In January 2019, he became the second bowler for Saurashtra to take 200 wickets in the Ranji Trophy and in August 2019 was named in the India Red team's squad for the 2019–20 Duleep Trophy before being named for India A for the 2019–20 Deodhar Trophy. He was the leading wicket-taker in the 2019–20 Ranji Trophy, with 67 dismissals in ten matches.

In February 2022, he was bought by the Mumbai Indians in the auction for the 2022 Indian Premier League tournament.

On 23 December 2022, he was bought by the Lucknow Super Giants in the IPL auction for the 2023 Indian Premier League tournament.

== International career ==
After playing for India's under-19 team in England in 2010, taking 13 wickets on his first-class cricket debut against West Indies under-19s at Grace Road, Unadkat was used as a net bowler for the Indian national team in Sri Lanka before making his international debut for India against South Africa in December 2010 in the first Test at Centurion.

In the 2nd Test against Bangladesh on 22 December 2022 at Mirpur, Unadkat was named as a replacement to Kuldeep Yadav. Jaydev Unadkat made his comeback to the Test team after 12 years.

Unadkat made his Twenty20 International (T20I) debut against Zimbabwe at Harare Sports Club in June 2016.
