= 2017 Royal Challengers Bangalore season =

Indian Premier League cricket team season

Royal Challengers Bangalore
2017 season
- Coach: Daniel Vettori
- Captain: Virat Kohli
- Ground(s): M. Chinnaswamy Stadium, Bangalore
- League stage: 8th
- Most runs: Virat Kohli (308)
- Most wickets: Pawan Negi (16)

Royal Challengers Bangalore is a franchise cricket team based in Bangalore, India, which plays in the Indian Premier League. They are one of the eight teams which are taking part in the 2017 Indian Premier League. They are captained by Virat Kohli and coached by Daniel Vettori. This was one of the most difficult seasons for RCB, as when it started their key players were injured and missed initial matches. Shane Watson took the responsibility of captaining RCB.

== Season standings ==
Pos	Team	Pld	W	L	NR	Pts	NRR	
1	Mumbai Indians (C)	14	10	4	0	20	0.784	Advanced to Qualifier 1
2	Rising Pune Supergiant (R)	14	9	5	0	18	0.176	Advanced to Qualifier 1
3	Sunrisers Hyderabad (4)	14	8	5	1	17	0.599	Advanced to the Eliminator
4	Kolkata Knight Riders (3)	14	8	6	0	16	0.641	Advanced to the Eliminator
5	Kings XI Punjab	14	7	7	0	14	−0.009	
6	Delhi Daredevils	14	6	8	0	12	−0.512	
7	Gujarat Lions	14	4	10	0	8	−0.412	
8	Royal Challengers Bangalore	14	3	10	1	7	−1.299	

Source: ESPNcricinfo
The four top ranked teams qualified for the playoffs

== Auction ==
The player auction for the 2017 Indian Premier League was held on 20 February in Bangalore. Five players were signed by the franchise.

- Pawan Negi
- Tymal Mills
- Aniket Choudhary
- Praveen Dubey
- Billy Stanlake

== Squad ==
- Players with international caps are listed in **bold**.

No.	Name	Nationality	Birth date	Batting style	Bowling style	Year signed	Salary	Notes
Batsmen
11	**KL Rahul**	India	18 April 1992 (aged 24)	Right-handed	Right-arm off break	2016	₹1 crore (US$150,000)	Occasional wicket-keeper
18	**Virat Kohli**	India	5 November 1988 (aged 28)	Right-handed	Right-arm medium	2014 (since 2008)	₹12.5 crore (US$1.92 million)	Captain
23	**Mandeep Singh**	India	18 December 1991 (aged 25)	Right-handed	Right-arm medium	2015	₹80 lakh (US$120,000)	
34	**Travis Head**	Australia	29 December 1993 (aged 23)	Left-handed	Right-arm off break	2016	₹50 lakh (US$77,000)	Overseas
36	Sachin Baby	India	18 December 1988 (aged 28)	Left-handed	Right-arm off break	2016	₹10 lakh (US$15,000)	
81	**Kedar Jadhav**	India	26 March 1985 (aged 32)	Right-handed	Right-arm off break	2016	₹2.17 crore (US$330,000)	Occasional wicket-keeper
97	Sarfaraz Khan	India	27 October 1997 (aged 19)	Right-handed	Right-arm off break	2015	₹50 lakh (US$77,000)	
333	**Chris Gayle**	Jamaica	21 September 1979 (aged 37)	Left-handed	Right-arm off break	2014 (since 2011)	₹8.4 crore (US$1.29 million)	Overseas
	Harpreet Singh Bhatia	India	11 August 1991 (aged 25)	Left-handed	Right-arm medium	2017	Replacement signing	
All-rounders
15	**Pawan Negi**	India	6 January 1993 (aged 24)	Left-handed	Slow left-arm orthodox	2017	₹1 crore (US$150,000)	
33	**Shane Watson**	Australia	17 June 1981 (aged 35)	Right-handed	Right-arm fast-medium	2016	₹9.5 crore (US$1.46 million)	Overseas
84	**Stuart Binny**	India	3 June 1984 (aged 32)	Right-handed	Right-arm medium	2016	₹2 crore (US$310,000)	
Wicket-keepers
4	Vishnu Vinod	India	2 December 1993 (aged 23)	Right-handed		2017	Replacement signing	
17	**AB de Villiers**	South Africa	17 February 1984 (aged 33)	Right-handed	Right-arm medium	2014 (since 2011)	₹9.5 crore (US$1.46 million)	Overseas/Vice-captain
Bowlers
3	**Yuzvendra Chahal**	India	23 July 1990 (aged 26)	Right-handed	Right-arm leg break googly	2014	₹10 lakh (US$15,000)	
6	**Sreenath Aravind**	India	8 April 1984 (aged 32)	Left-handed	Left-arm medium-fast	2014 (since 2011)	₹10 lakh (US$15,000)	
9	Aniket Choudhary	India	28 January 1990 (aged 27)	Right-handed	Left-arm medium-fast	2017	₹2 crore (US$310,000)	
13	Harshal Patel	India	23 November 1990 (aged 26)	Right-handed	Right-arm medium-fast	2014 (since 2013)	₹40 lakh (US$61,000)	
19	Avesh Khan	India	13 December 1996 (aged 20)	Right-handed	Right-arm fast-medium	2016	₹10 lakh (US$15,000)	
20	**Adam Milne**	New Zealand	13 April 1992 (aged 24)	Right-handed	Right-arm fast	2015	₹70 lakh (US$110,000)	Overseas
21	Iqbal Abdulla	India	2 December 1989 (aged 27)	Left-handed	Slow left-arm orthodox	2016	₹10 lakh (US$15,000)	
37	**Billy Stanlake**	Australia	13 April 1992 (aged 24)	Left-handed	Right-arm fast	2017	₹30 lakh (US$46,000)	Overseas
56	**Tymal Mills**	England	12 August 1992 (aged 24)	Right-handed	Left-arm fast	2017	₹12 crore (US$1.84 million)	Overseas
77	**Samuel Badree**	Trinidad and Tobago	9 March 1981 (aged 36)	Right-handed	Right-arm leg break	2016	₹50 lakh (US$77,000)	Overseas
90	**Tabraiz Shamsi**	South Africa	18 February 1990 (aged 27)	Right-handed	Slow left-arm wrist-spin	2016	₹10 lakh (US$15,000)	Overseas
	Praveen Dubey	India	1 July 1993 (aged 23)	Right-handed	Right-arm leg break googly	2017	₹10 lakh (US$15,000)	

== Personnel ==
The team is owned by Diageo through United Spirits Limited. Amrit Thomas, acts as the director of team. Retired Indian cricketer Brijesh Patel, serves as the CEO for the team. Russell Adams is the vice president for commercial operations. Avinash Vaidya is the team manager. Daniel Vettori heads the coaching team which consists of Allan Donald (bowling coach), Trent Woodhill (batting and fielding coach), Even Speechly (physio) and Shankar Basu (strength and condition coach).

== Trivia ==
23 April was the highest total runs (263/5) in IPL by RCB (2013). Also at the same date they scored the lowest runs (49/10) in IPL.

== Season ==
5 April	(H) Sunrisers Hyderabad; 207/4 (20 overs)	v	Royal Challengers Bangalore; 172 (19.4 overs)	Sunrisers Hyderabad won by 35 runs
20:00 (D/N); Scorecard	(H) Sunrisers Hyderabad; 207/4 (20 overs)	v	Royal Challengers Bangalore; 172 (19.4 overs)	Rajiv Gandhi International Cricket Stadium, Hyderabad; Umpires: Anil Dandekar (India) and Nigel Llong (England); Player of the match: Yuvraj Singh (Sunrisers Hyderabad)
20:00 (D/N); Scorecard	Yuvraj Singh 62 (27); Stuart Binny 1/10 (1 over)		Chris Gayle 32 (21); Bhuvneshwar Kumar 2/27 (4 overs)	Rajiv Gandhi International Cricket Stadium, Hyderabad; Umpires: Anil Dandekar (India) and Nigel Llong (England); Player of the match: Yuvraj Singh (Sunrisers Hyderabad)
Royal Challengers Bangalore won the toss and elected to field.				Rajiv Gandhi International Cricket Stadium, Hyderabad; Umpires: Anil Dandekar (India) and Nigel Llong (England); Player of the match: Yuvraj Singh (Sunrisers Hyderabad)

8 April	(H) Royal Challengers Bangalore; 157/8 (20 overs)	v	Delhi Daredevils; 142/9 (20 overs)	Royal Challengers Bangalore won by 15 runs
20:00 (D/N); Scorecard	(H) Royal Challengers Bangalore; 157/8 (20 overs)	v	Delhi Daredevils; 142/9 (20 overs)	M. Chinnaswamy Stadium, Bangalore; Umpires: Sundaram Ravi (India) and Virender Kumar Sharma (India); Player of the match: Kedar Jadhav (Royal Challengers Bangalore)
20:00 (D/N); Scorecard	Kedar Jadhav 69(37); Chris Morris 3/21 (4 overs)		Rishabh Pant 57(36); Pawan Negi 2/3 (1 over)	M. Chinnaswamy Stadium, Bangalore; Umpires: Sundaram Ravi (India) and Virender Kumar Sharma (India); Player of the match: Kedar Jadhav (Royal Challengers Bangalore)
Royal Challengers Bangalore won the toss and elected to bat.				M. Chinnaswamy Stadium, Bangalore; Umpires: Sundaram Ravi (India) and Virender Kumar Sharma (India); Player of the match: Kedar Jadhav (Royal Challengers Bangalore)

10 April	(H) Kings XI Punjab; 150/2 (14.3 overs)	v	Royal Challengers Bangalore; 148/4 (20 overs)	Kings XI Punjab won by 8 wickets
20:00 (D/N); Scorecard	(H) Kings XI Punjab; 150/2 (14.3 overs)	v	Royal Challengers Bangalore; 148/4 (20 overs)	Holkar Stadium, Indore; Umpires: Anil Chaudhary (India) and C Shamshuddin (India); Player of the match: Axar Patel(Kings XI Punjab)
20:00 (D/N); Scorecard	Hashim Amla 58*(38); Tymal Mills 1/22 (2 overs)		AB de Villiers 89*(46); Varun Aaron 2/21 (4 overs)	Holkar Stadium, Indore; Umpires: Anil Chaudhary (India) and C Shamshuddin (India); Player of the match: Axar Patel(Kings XI Punjab)
Royal Challengers Bangalore won the toss and elected to bat.				Holkar Stadium, Indore; Umpires: Anil Chaudhary (India) and C Shamshuddin (India); Player of the match: Axar Patel(Kings XI Punjab)

14 April	(H) Royal Challengers Bangalore; 142/5 (20 overs)	v	Mumbai Indians; 145/6 (18.5 overs)	Mumbai Indians won by 4 wickets.
16:00 (D/N); Scorecard	(H) Royal Challengers Bangalore; 142/5 (20 overs)	v	Mumbai Indians; 145/6 (18.5 overs)	M. Chinnaswamy Stadium, Bangalore; Umpires: Anil Chaudhary (India) and KN Ananthapadmanabhan (India); Player of the match: Kieron Pollard (Mumbai Indians)
16:00 (D/N); Scorecard	Virat Kohli 62(47); Mitchell McClenaghan 2/20 (4 overs)		Kieron Pollard 70(47); Samuel Badree 4/9 (4 overs)	M. Chinnaswamy Stadium, Bangalore; Umpires: Anil Chaudhary (India) and KN Ananthapadmanabhan (India); Player of the match: Kieron Pollard (Mumbai Indians)
Mumbai Indians won the toss and elected to field; Samuel Badree (Royal Challengers Bangalore) took a hat-trick.				M. Chinnaswamy Stadium, Bangalore; Umpires: Anil Chaudhary (India) and KN Ananthapadmanabhan (India); Player of the match: Kieron Pollard (Mumbai Indians)

16 April	(H) Royal Challengers Bangalore; 134/9 (20 overs)	v	Rising Pune Supergiant; 161/8 (20 overs)	Rising Pune Supergiant won by 27 runs.
20:00 (D/N); Scorecard	(H) Royal Challengers Bangalore; 134/9 (20 overs)	v	Rising Pune Supergiant; 161/8 (20 overs)	M. Chinnaswamy Stadium, Bangalore; Umpires: KN Ananthapadmanabhan (India) and C Shamshuddin (India); Player of the match: Ben Stokes (Rising Pune Supergiant)
20:00 (D/N); Scorecard	AB De Villiers 29(30); Ben Stokes 3/18 (4 overs)		Rahul Tripathi 31(23); Adam Milne 2/27 (4 overs)	M. Chinnaswamy Stadium, Bangalore; Umpires: KN Ananthapadmanabhan (India) and C Shamshuddin (India); Player of the match: Ben Stokes (Rising Pune Supergiant)
Royal Challengers Bangalore won the toss and elected to field				M. Chinnaswamy Stadium, Bangalore; Umpires: KN Ananthapadmanabhan (India) and C Shamshuddin (India); Player of the match: Ben Stokes (Rising Pune Supergiant)

18 April	Royal Challengers Bangalore; 213/2 (20 overs)	v	Gujarat Lions (H); 192/7 (20 overs)	Royal Challengers Bangalore won by 21 runs
20:00 (D/N); Scorecard	Royal Challengers Bangalore; 213/2 (20 overs)	v	Gujarat Lions (H); 192/7 (20 overs)	Saurashtra Cricket Association Stadium, Rajkot; Umpires: Sundaram Ravi (India) and Virender Sharma (India); Player of the match: Chris Gayle (Royal Challengers Bangalore)
20:00 (D/N); Scorecard	Chris Gayle 77 (38); Basil Thampi 1/31 (4 overs)		Brendon McCullum 72 (44); Yuzvendra Chahal 3/31 (4 overs)	Saurashtra Cricket Association Stadium, Rajkot; Umpires: Sundaram Ravi (India) and Virender Sharma (India); Player of the match: Chris Gayle (Royal Challengers Bangalore)
Gujarat Lions won the toss and elected to field.; Chris Gayle (Royal Challengers Bangalore) became the first player to score 10,000 runs in T20s.				Saurashtra Cricket Association Stadium, Rajkot; Umpires: Sundaram Ravi (India) and Virender Sharma (India); Player of the match: Chris Gayle (Royal Challengers Bangalore)

23 April	(H) Kolkata Knight Riders; 131 (19.3 overs)	v	Royal Challengers Bangalore; 49 (9.4 overs)	Kolkata Knight Riders win by 82 runs
20:00 (D/N); Scorecard	(H) Kolkata Knight Riders; 131 (19.3 overs)	v	Royal Challengers Bangalore; 49 (9.4 overs)	Eden Gardens, Kolkata; Umpires: Chris Gaffaney, O Nandan, Nitin Menon, K Srinivasan; Player of the match: Nathan Coulter-Nile (Kolkata Knight Riders)
20:00 (D/N); Scorecard	Sunil Narine 34(17); Yuzvendra Chahal 3/16(4 overs)		Kedar Jadhav 9(7); Chris Woakes 3/6(2 overs)	Eden Gardens, Kolkata; Umpires: Chris Gaffaney, O Nandan, Nitin Menon, K Srinivasan; Player of the match: Nathan Coulter-Nile (Kolkata Knight Riders)
Royal Challengers Bangalore won the toss and elected to field; Royal Challengers Bangalore's total score is the lowest in the history of IPL.				Eden Gardens, Kolkata; Umpires: Chris Gaffaney, O Nandan, Nitin Menon, K Srinivasan; Player of the match: Nathan Coulter-Nile (Kolkata Knight Riders)

25 April	(H) Royal Challengers Bangalore	v	Sunrisers Hyderabad	Match abandoned without a ball bowled
20:00 (D/N); Scorecard	(H) Royal Challengers Bangalore	v	Sunrisers Hyderabad	M. Chinnaswamy Stadium, Bangalore; Umpires: Marais Erasmus (South Africa) and Chettithody Shamshuddin (India)
No toss.; No play was possible due to rain.				M. Chinnaswamy Stadium, Bangalore; Umpires: Marais Erasmus (South Africa) and Chettithody Shamshuddin (India)

27 April	(H) Royal Challengers Bangalore; 134 (20 overs)	v	Gujarat Lions; 135/3 (13.5 overs)	Gujarat Lions won by 7 wickets
20:00 (D/N); Scorecard	(H) Royal Challengers Bangalore; 134 (20 overs)	v	Gujarat Lions; 135/3 (13.5 overs)	M. Chinnaswamy Stadium, Bangalore; Umpires: Anil Chaudhary (India) and Chettithody Shamshuddin (India); Player of the match: Andrew Tye (Gujarat Lions)
20:00 (D/N); Scorecard	Pawan Negi 32 (19); Andrew Tye 3/12 (4 overs)		Aaron Finch 72 (34); Samuel Badree 2/29 (3 overs)	M. Chinnaswamy Stadium, Bangalore; Umpires: Anil Chaudhary (India) and Chettithody Shamshuddin (India); Player of the match: Andrew Tye (Gujarat Lions)
Gujarat Lions won the toss and elected to field.; Ankit Soni (Gujarat Lions) made his T20 debut.				M. Chinnaswamy Stadium, Bangalore; Umpires: Anil Chaudhary (India) and Chettithody Shamshuddin (India); Player of the match: Andrew Tye (Gujarat Lions)

29 April	(H) Rising Pune Supergiant; 157/3 (20 overs)	v	Royal Challengers Bangalore; 96/9 (20 overs)	Rising Pune Supergiant won by 61 runs
16:00 (D/N); Scorecard	(H) Rising Pune Supergiant; 157/3 (20 overs)	v	Royal Challengers Bangalore; 96/9 (20 overs)	Maharashtra Cricket Association Stadium, Pune; Umpires: K. N. Ananthapadmanabhan (India) and Marais Erasmus (South Africa); Player of the match: Lockie Ferguson (Rising Pune Supergiant)
16:00 (D/N); Scorecard	Steve Smith 45 (32); Stuart Binny 1/17 (2 overs)		Virat Kohli 55 (48); Imran Tahir 3/18 (4 overs)	Maharashtra Cricket Association Stadium, Pune; Umpires: K. N. Ananthapadmanabhan (India) and Marais Erasmus (South Africa); Player of the match: Lockie Ferguson (Rising Pune Supergiant)
Royal Challengers Bangalore won the toss and elected to field.				Maharashtra Cricket Association Stadium, Pune; Umpires: K. N. Ananthapadmanabhan (India) and Marais Erasmus (South Africa); Player of the match: Lockie Ferguson (Rising Pune Supergiant)

1 May	Royal Challengers Bangalore; 162/8 (20 overs)	v	Mumbai Indians (H); 165/5 (19.5 overs)	Mumbai Indians won by 5 wickets
16:00 (D/N); Scorecard	Royal Challengers Bangalore; 162/8 (20 overs)	v	Mumbai Indians (H); 165/5 (19.5 overs)	Wankhede Stadium, Mumbai; Umpires: Anil Chaudhary (India) and Chris Gaffaney (New Zealand); Player of the match: Rohit Sharma (Mumbai Indians)
16:00 (D/N); Scorecard	AB de Villiers 43 (27); Mitchell McClenaghan 3/34 (4 overs)		Rohit Sharma 56 (37); Pawan Negi 2/17 (4 overs)	Wankhede Stadium, Mumbai; Umpires: Anil Chaudhary (India) and Chris Gaffaney (New Zealand); Player of the match: Rohit Sharma (Mumbai Indians)
Royal Challenges Bangalore won the toss and elected to bat.				Wankhede Stadium, Mumbai; Umpires: Anil Chaudhary (India) and Chris Gaffaney (New Zealand); Player of the match: Rohit Sharma (Mumbai Indians)

5 May	Kings XI Punjab; 138/7 (20 overs)	v	Royal Challengers Bangalore (H); 119 (19 overs)	Kings XI Punjab won by 19 runs
20:00 (D/N); Scorecard	Kings XI Punjab; 138/7 (20 overs)	v	Royal Challengers Bangalore (H); 119 (19 overs)	M. Chinnaswamy Stadium, Bangalore; Umpires: Chris Gaffaney (New Zealand) and Chettithody Shamshuddin (India); Player of the match: Sandeep Sharma (Kings XI Punjab)
20:00 (D/N); Scorecard	Axar Patel 38* (17); Aniket Choudhary 2/17 (4 overs)		Mandeep Singh 46 (40); Axar Patel 3/11 (3 overs)	M. Chinnaswamy Stadium, Bangalore; Umpires: Chris Gaffaney (New Zealand) and Chettithody Shamshuddin (India); Player of the match: Sandeep Sharma (Kings XI Punjab)
Royal Challenges Bangalore won the toss and elected to field.				M. Chinnaswamy Stadium, Bangalore; Umpires: Chris Gaffaney (New Zealand) and Chettithody Shamshuddin (India); Player of the match: Sandeep Sharma (Kings XI Punjab)

7 May	(H) Royal Challengers Bangalore; 158/6 (20 overs)	v	Kolkata Knight Riders; 159/4 (15.1 overs)	Kolkata Knight Riders won by 6 wickets
16:00 (D/N); Scorecard	(H) Royal Challengers Bangalore; 158/6 (20 overs)	v	Kolkata Knight Riders; 159/4 (15.1 overs)	M. Chinnaswamy Stadium, Bangalore; Umpires: Anil Dandekar (India) and Chettithody Shamshuddin (India); Player of the match: Sunil Narine (Kolkata Knight Riders)
16:00 (D/N); Scorecard	Travis Head 75* (47); Umesh Yadav 3/36 (4 overs)		Sunil Narine 54 (17); Pawan Negi 2/21 (3.1 overs)	M. Chinnaswamy Stadium, Bangalore; Umpires: Anil Dandekar (India) and Chettithody Shamshuddin (India); Player of the match: Sunil Narine (Kolkata Knight Riders)
Kolkata Knight Riders won the toss and elected to field.; yes				M. Chinnaswamy Stadium, Bangalore; Umpires: Anil Dandekar (India) and Chettithody Shamshuddin (India); Player of the match: Sunil Narine (Kolkata Knight Riders)

14 May	Royal Challengers Bangalore; 161/6 (20 overs)	v	Delhi Daredevils (H); 151 (20 overs)	Royal Challengers Bangalore won by 10 runs
20:00 (D/N); Scorecard	Royal Challengers Bangalore; 161/6 (20 overs)	v	Delhi Daredevils (H); 151 (20 overs)	Feroz Shah Kotla, Delhi; Umpires: C. K. Nandan (India) and Chettithody Shamshuddin (India); Player of the match: Harshal Patel (Royal Challengers Bangalore)
20:00 (D/N); Scorecard	Virat Kohli 58 (45); Pat Cummins 2/21 (4 overs)		Rishabh Pant 45 (34); Pawan Negi 3/10 (2 overs)	Feroz Shah Kotla, Delhi; Umpires: C. K. Nandan (India) and Chettithody Shamshuddin (India); Player of the match: Harshal Patel (Royal Challengers Bangalore)
Royal Challengers Bangalore won the toss and elected to bat.; Avesh Khan (Royal Challengers Bangalore) made his T20 debut.				Feroz Shah Kotla, Delhi; Umpires: C. K. Nandan (India) and Chettithody Shamshuddin (India); Player of the match: Harshal Patel (Royal Challengers Bangalore)
