= 2017 Gujarat Lions season =

Indian Premier League cricket team season

Gujarat Lions
2017 Indian Premier League season
- Coach: Brad Hodge
- Captain: Suresh Raina
- IPL: Group Stage (7th)

Gujarat Lions were a franchise cricket team based in Rajkot, Gujarat, India, which played in the Indian Premier League (IPL) in 2016 and 2017. They were one of eight teams which competed in the 2017 Indian Premier League. The team was captained by Suresh Raina and coached by Brad Hodge. The side finished seventh in the league and did not qualify for the playoffs.

== Standings ==
| Pos | Team | Pld | W | L | NR | Pts | NRR | |
|---|---|---|---|---|---|---|---|---|
| 1 | Mumbai Indians (C) | 14 | 10 | 4 | 0 | 20 | 0.784 | Advanced to Qualifier 1 |
| 2 | Rising Pune Supergiant (R) | 14 | 9 | 5 | 0 | 18 | 0.176 | Advanced to Qualifier 1 |
| 3 | Sunrisers Hyderabad (4) | 14 | 8 | 5 | 1 | 17 | 0.599 | Advanced to the Eliminator |
| 4 | Kolkata Knight Riders (3) | 14 | 8 | 6 | 0 | 16 | 0.641 | Advanced to the Eliminator |
| 5 | Kings XI Punjab | 14 | 7 | 7 | 0 | 14 | −0.009 | |
| 6 | Delhi Daredevils | 14 | 6 | 8 | 0 | 12 | −0.512 | |
| 7 | Gujarat Lions | 14 | 4 | 10 | 0 | 8 | −0.412 | |
| 8 | Royal Challengers Bangalore | 14 | 3 | 10 | 1 | 7 | −1.299 | |

Source: ESPNcricinfo
The four top ranked teams qualified for the playoffs

== Auction ==
The player auction for the 2017 season was held 20 February in Bangalore.

== Squad ==
- Players with international caps are listed in **bold**.

| No. | Name | Nationality | Birth date | Batting style | Bowling style | Year signed | Salary | Notes |
Batsmen
| 3 | **Suresh Raina** | India | 27 November 1986 (aged 30) | Left-handed | Right-arm off break | 2016 | ₹12.5 crore (US$1.92 million) | Captain |
| 10 | Akshdeep Nath | India | 10 May 1993 (aged 23) | Right-handed | Right-arm medium | 2017 | ₹10 lakh (US$15,000) | |
| 16 | **Aaron Finch** | Australia | 17 November 1986 (aged 30) | Right-handed | Slow left-arm orthodox | 2016 | ₹1 crore (US$150,000) | Overseas |
| 20 | **Jason Roy** | England | 21 July 1990 (aged 26) | Right-handed | Right-arm medium | 2017 | ₹1 crore (US$150,000) | Overseas |
| 42 | **Brendon McCullum** | New Zealand | 27 September 1981 (aged 35) | Right-handed | Right-arm medium | 2016 | ₹7.5 crore (US$1.15 million) | Overseas, Vice Captain |
| | Jaydev Shah | India | 4 May 1983 (aged 33) | Left-handed | Right-arm off break | 2016 | ₹20 lakh (US$31,000) | |
| | Chirag Suri | United Arab Emirates | 18 February 1995 (aged 22) | Right-handed | Right-arm off break | 2017 | ₹10 lakh (US$15,000) | Overseas |
| | Pratham Singh | India | 21 August 1992 (aged 24) | Left-handed | Right-arm off break | 2017 | ₹20 lakh (US$31,000) | |
All-rounders
| 8 | **Ravindra Jadeja** | India | 6 December 1988 (aged 28) | Left-handed | Slow left-arm orthodox | 2016 | ₹9.5 crore (US$1.46 million) | |
| 14 | Shubham Agarwal | India | 21 September 1993 (aged 23) | Right-handed | Right-arm leg break googly | 2017 | ₹10 lakh (US$15,000) | |
| 44 | **James Faulkner** | Australia | 29 April 1990 (aged 26) | Right-handed | Left-arm medium-fast | 2016 | ₹5.5 crore (US$840,000) | Overseas |
| 47 | **Dwayne Bravo** | Trinidad and Tobago | 7 October 1983 (aged 33) | Right-handed | Right-arm medium-fast | 2016 | ₹4 crore (US$610,000) | Overseas |
| 50 | **Dwayne Smith** | Barbados | 12 April 1983 (aged 33) | Right-handed | Right-arm medium-fast | 2016 | ₹2.3 crore (US$350,000) | Overseas |
| 56 | **Irfan Pathan** | India | 27 October 1984 (aged 32) | Left-handed | Left-arm medium-fast | 2016 | Replacement signing | |
Wicket-keepers
| 19 | **Dinesh Karthik** | India | 1 June 1985 (aged 31) | Right-handed | | 2016 | ₹2.3 crore (US$350,000) | |
| 23 | Ishan Kishan | India | 18 July 1998 (aged 18) | Left-handed | | 2016 | ₹35 lakh (US$54,000) | |
Bowlers
| 1 | Tejas Baroka | India | 1 February 1996 (aged 21) | Right-handed | Right-arm leg break googly | 2017 | ₹10 lakh (US$15,000) | |
| 5 | Ankit Soni | India | 2 August 1993 (aged 23) | Right-handed | Right-arm leg break | 2017 | Replacement signing | |
| 7 | Nathu Singh | India | 8 September 1995 (aged 21) | Right-handed | Right-arm fast-medium | 2017 | ₹50 lakh (US$77,000) | |
| 9 | **Manpreet Gony** | India | 4 January 1984 (aged 33) | Right-handed | Right-arm medium-fast | 2017 | ₹60 lakh (US$92,000) | |
| 13 | **Munaf Patel** | India | 12 July 1983 (aged 33) | Right-handed | Right-arm medium-fast | 2017 | ₹30 lakh (US$46,000) | |
| 17 | **Praveen Kumar** | India | 2 October 1986 (aged 30) | Right-handed | Right-arm medium-fast | 2016 | ₹3.5 crore (US$540,000) | |
| 18 | Pradeep Sangwan | India | 5 November 1990 (aged 26) | Right-handed | Left-arm fast-medium | 2016 | ₹20 lakh (US$31,000) | |
| 27 | Shadab Jakati | India | 27 November 1980 (aged 36) | Left-handed | Slow left-arm orthodox | 2016 | ₹20 lakh (US$31,000) | |
| 30 | Basil Thampi | India | 11 September 1993 (aged 23) | Right-handed | Right-arm fast-medium | 2017 | ₹85 lakh (US$130,000) | |
| 36 | Shivil Kaushik | India | 9 July 1995 (aged 21) | Right-handed | Slow left-arm wrist-spin | 2016 | ₹10 lakh (US$15,000) | |
| 68 | **Andrew Tye** | Australia | 12 December 1986 (aged 30) | Right-handed | Right-arm fast-medium | 2016 | ₹50 lakh (US$77,000) | Overseas |
| 91 | **Dhawal Kulkarni** | India | 10 December 1988 (aged 28) | Right-handed | Right-arm medium-fast | 2016 | ₹2 crore (US$310,000) | |
| | Shelley Shaurya | India | 17 September 1993 (aged 23) | Right-handed | Right-arm medium-fast | 2017 | ₹10 lakh (US$15,000) | |

== Fixtures ==
| 7 April | (H) Gujarat Lions; 183/4 (20 overs) | v | Kolkata Knight Riders; 184/0 (14.5 overs) | Kolkata Knight Riders won by 10 wickets |
| (D/N); Scorecard | (H) Gujarat Lions; 183/4 (20 overs) | v | Kolkata Knight Riders; 184/0 (14.5 overs) | Saurashtra Cricket Association Stadium, Rajkot; Umpires: Nitin Menon (India) and C. K. Nandan (India); Player of the match: Chris Lynn (Kolkata Knight Riders) |
| (D/N); Scorecard | Suresh Raina 68* (51); Kuldeep Yadav 2/25 (4 overs) | | Chris Lynn 93* (41); Praveen Kumar 0/13 (2 overs) | Saurashtra Cricket Association Stadium, Rajkot; Umpires: Nitin Menon (India) and C. K. Nandan (India); Player of the match: Chris Lynn (Kolkata Knight Riders) |
| Kolkata Knight Riders won the toss and elected to field.; This was the highest total successfully chased without losing a wicket in a T20 match. | | | | Saurashtra Cricket Association Stadium, Rajkot; Umpires: Nitin Menon (India) and C. K. Nandan (India); Player of the match: Chris Lynn (Kolkata Knight Riders) |

| 9 April | Gujarat Lions; 135/7 (20 overs) | v | Sunrisers Hyderabad (H); 140/1 (15.3 overs) | Sunrisers Hyderabad won by 9 wickets |
| (D/N); Scorecard | Gujarat Lions; 135/7 (20 overs) | v | Sunrisers Hyderabad (H); 140/1 (15.3 overs) | Rajiv Gandhi International Cricket Stadium, Hyderabad; Umpires: Abhijit Deshmukh (India) and Nigel Llong (England); Player of the match: Rashid Khan (Sunrisers Hyderabad) |
| (D/N); Scorecard | Dwayne Smith 37 (27); Rashid Khan 3/19 (4 overs) | | David Warner 76* (45); Praveen Kumar 1/16 (2 overs) | Rajiv Gandhi International Cricket Stadium, Hyderabad; Umpires: Abhijit Deshmukh (India) and Nigel Llong (England); Player of the match: Rashid Khan (Sunrisers Hyderabad) |
| Sunrisers Hyderabad won the toss and elected to field.; Tejas Baroka (Gujarat Lions) made his T20 debut. | | | | Rajiv Gandhi International Cricket Stadium, Hyderabad; Umpires: Abhijit Deshmukh (India) and Nigel Llong (England); Player of the match: Rashid Khan (Sunrisers Hyderabad) |

| 14 April | Rising Pune Supergiant; 171/8 (20 overs) | v | Gujarat Lions (H); 172/3 (18 overs) | Gujarat Lions won by 7 wickets |
| (D/N); Scorecard | Rising Pune Supergiant; 171/8 (20 overs) | v | Gujarat Lions (H); 172/3 (18 overs) | Saurashtra Cricket Association Stadium, Rajkot; Umpires: Nand Kishore (India) and Sundaram Ravi (India); Player of the match: Andrew Tye (Gujarat Lions) |
| (D/N); Scorecard | Steve Smith 43 (28); Andrew Tye 5/17 (4 overs) | | Brendon McCullum 49 (32); Shardul Thakur 1/14 (3 overs) | Saurashtra Cricket Association Stadium, Rajkot; Umpires: Nand Kishore (India) and Sundaram Ravi (India); Player of the match: Andrew Tye (Gujarat Lions) |
| Gujarat Lions won the toss and elected to field.; Andrew Tye (Gujarat Lions) took a hat-trick. | | | | Saurashtra Cricket Association Stadium, Rajkot; Umpires: Nand Kishore (India) and Sundaram Ravi (India); Player of the match: Andrew Tye (Gujarat Lions) |

| 16 April | Gujarat Lions; 176/4 (20 overs) | v | Mumbai Indians (H); 177/4 (19.3 overs) | Mumbai Indians won by 6 wickets |
| 16:00 (D/N); Scorecard | Gujarat Lions; 176/4 (20 overs) | v | Mumbai Indians (H); 177/4 (19.3 overs) | Wankhede Stadium, Mumbai; Umpires: Nand Kishore (India) and Sundaram Ravi (India); Player of the match: Nitish Rana (Mumbai Indians) |
| 16:00 (D/N); Scorecard | Brendon McCullum 64 (44); Mitchell McClenaghan 2/24 (4 overs) | | Nitish Rana 53 (36); Andrew Tye 2/34 (4 overs) | Wankhede Stadium, Mumbai; Umpires: Nand Kishore (India) and Sundaram Ravi (India); Player of the match: Nitish Rana (Mumbai Indians) |
| Mumbai Indians won the toss and elected to field. | | | | Wankhede Stadium, Mumbai; Umpires: Nand Kishore (India) and Sundaram Ravi (India); Player of the match: Nitish Rana (Mumbai Indians) |

| 18 April | Royal Challengers Bangalore; 213/2 (20 overs) | v | Gujarat Lions (H); 192/7 (20 overs) | Royal Challengers Bangalore won by 21 runs |
| 20:00 (D/N); Scorecard | Royal Challengers Bangalore; 213/2 (20 overs) | v | Gujarat Lions (H); 192/7 (20 overs) | Saurashtra Cricket Association Stadium, Rajkot; Umpires: Sundaram Ravi (India) and Virender Sharma (India); Player of the match: Chris Gayle (Royal Challengers Bangalore) |
| 20:00 (D/N); Scorecard | Chris Gayle 77 (38); Basil Thampi 1/31 (4 overs) | | Brendon McCullum 72 (44); Yuzvendra Chahal 3/31 (4 overs) | Saurashtra Cricket Association Stadium, Rajkot; Umpires: Sundaram Ravi (India) and Virender Sharma (India); Player of the match: Chris Gayle (Royal Challengers Bangalore) |
| Gujarat Lions won the toss and elected to field.; Chris Gayle (Royal Challengers Bangalore) became the first player to score 10,000 runs in T20s. | | | | Saurashtra Cricket Association Stadium, Rajkot; Umpires: Sundaram Ravi (India) and Virender Sharma (India); Player of the match: Chris Gayle (Royal Challengers Bangalore) |

| 23 April | Kings XI Punjab; 188/7 (20 overs) | v | Gujarat Lions (H); 162/7 (20 overs) | Kings XI Punjab won by 26 runs |
| 16:00 (D/N); Scorecard | Kings XI Punjab; 188/7 (20 overs) | v | Gujarat Lions (H); 162/7 (20 overs) | Saurashtra Cricket Association Stadium, Rajkot; Umpires: Anil Chaudhary (India) and Marais Erasmus (South Africa); Player of the match: Hashim Amla (Kings XI Punjab) |
| 16:00 (D/N); Scorecard | Hashim Amla 65 (40); Andrew Tye 2/35 (4 overs) | | Dinesh Karthik 58* (43); KC Cariappa 2/24 (4 overs) | Saurashtra Cricket Association Stadium, Rajkot; Umpires: Anil Chaudhary (India) and Marais Erasmus (South Africa); Player of the match: Hashim Amla (Kings XI Punjab) |
| Gujarat Lions won the toss and elected to field. | | | | Saurashtra Cricket Association Stadium, Rajkot; Umpires: Anil Chaudhary (India) and Marais Erasmus (South Africa); Player of the match: Hashim Amla (Kings XI Punjab) |

| 27 April | (H) Royal Challengers Bangalore; 134 (20 overs) | v | Gujarat Lions; 135/3 (13.5 overs) | Gujarat Lions won by 7 wickets |
| 20:00 (D/N); Scorecard | (H) Royal Challengers Bangalore; 134 (20 overs) | v | Gujarat Lions; 135/3 (13.5 overs) | M. Chinnaswamy Stadium, Bangalore; Umpires: Anil Chaudhary (India) and Chettithody Shamshuddin (India); Player of the match: Andrew Tye (Gujarat Lions) |
| 20:00 (D/N); Scorecard | Pawan Negi 32 (19); Andrew Tye 3/12 (4 overs) | | Aaron Finch 72 (34); Samuel Badree 2/29 (3 overs) | M. Chinnaswamy Stadium, Bangalore; Umpires: Anil Chaudhary (India) and Chettithody Shamshuddin (India); Player of the match: Andrew Tye (Gujarat Lions) |
| Gujarat Lions won the toss and elected to field.; Ankit Soni (Gujarat Lions) made his T20 debut. | | | | M. Chinnaswamy Stadium, Bangalore; Umpires: Anil Chaudhary (India) and Chettithody Shamshuddin (India); Player of the match: Andrew Tye (Gujarat Lions) |

| 29 April | (H) Gujarat Lions; 153/9 | v | Mumbai Indians; 153 | Match tied (Mumbai Indians won the Super Over) |
| 20:00 (D/N); Scorecard | (H) Gujarat Lions; 153/9 | v | Mumbai Indians; 153 | Saurashtra Cricket Association Stadium, Rajkot; Umpires: Anil Chaudhary (India) and Chris Gaffaney (New Zealand); Player of the match: Krunal Pandya (Mumbai Indians) |
| 20:00 (D/N); Scorecard | Ishan Kishan 48 (35); Krunal Pandya 3/14 (4 overs) | | Parthiv Patel 70 (44); Basil Thampi 2/29 (4 overs) | Saurashtra Cricket Association Stadium, Rajkot; Umpires: Anil Chaudhary (India) and Chris Gaffaney (New Zealand); Player of the match: Krunal Pandya (Mumbai Indians) |
| Gujarat Lions won the toss and elected to bat | | | | Saurashtra Cricket Association Stadium, Rajkot; Umpires: Anil Chaudhary (India) and Chris Gaffaney (New Zealand); Player of the match: Krunal Pandya (Mumbai Indians) |

| 1 May | Gujarat Lions; 161 (19.5 overs) | v | Rising Pune Supergiant (H); 167/5 (19.5 overs) | Rising Pune Supergiant won by 5 wickets |
| 20:00 (D/N); Scorecard | Gujarat Lions; 161 (19.5 overs) | v | Rising Pune Supergiant (H); 167/5 (19.5 overs) | Maharashtra Cricket Association Stadium, Pune; Umpires: Marais Erasmus (South Africa) and Chettithody Shamshuddin (India); Player of the match: Ben Stokes (Rising Pune Supergiant) |
| 20:00 (D/N); Scorecard | Brendon McCullum 45 (27); Imran Tahir 3/27 (4 overs) | | Ben Stokes 103* (63); Basil Thampi 2/35 (4 overs) | Maharashtra Cricket Association Stadium, Pune; Umpires: Marais Erasmus (South Africa) and Chettithody Shamshuddin (India); Player of the match: Ben Stokes (Rising Pune Supergiant) |
| Rising Pune Supergiant won the toss and elected to field.; Ben Stokes (Rising Pune Supergiant) scored his first century in a T20. | | | | Maharashtra Cricket Association Stadium, Pune; Umpires: Marais Erasmus (South Africa) and Chettithody Shamshuddin (India); Player of the match: Ben Stokes (Rising Pune Supergiant) |

| 4 May | Gujarat Lions; 208/7 (20 overs) | v | Delhi Daredevils (H); 214/3 (17.3 overs) | Delhi Daredevils won by 7 wickets |
| 20:00 (D/N); Scorecard | Gujarat Lions; 208/7 (20 overs) | v | Delhi Daredevils (H); 214/3 (17.3 overs) | Feroz Shah Kotla, Delhi; Umpires: Marais Erasmus (South Africa) and Nitin Menon (India); Player of the match: Rishabh Pant (Delhi Daredevils) |
| 20:00 (D/N); Scorecard | Suresh Raina 77 (43); Kagiso Rabada 2/28 (4 overs) | | Rishabh Pant 97 (43); Ravindra Jadeja 1/28 (2 overs) | Feroz Shah Kotla, Delhi; Umpires: Marais Erasmus (South Africa) and Nitin Menon (India); Player of the match: Rishabh Pant (Delhi Daredevils) |
| Delhi Daredevils won the toss and elected to field. | | | | Feroz Shah Kotla, Delhi; Umpires: Marais Erasmus (South Africa) and Nitin Menon (India); Player of the match: Rishabh Pant (Delhi Daredevils) |

| 7 May | (H) Kings XI Punjab; 189/3 (20 overs) | v | Gujarat Lions; 192/4 (19.4 overs) | Gujarat Lions won by 6 wickets |
| 20:00 (D/N); Scorecard | (H) Kings XI Punjab; 189/3 (20 overs) | v | Gujarat Lions; 192/4 (19.4 overs) | Punjab Cricket Association IS Bindra Stadium, Mohali; Umpires: Nand Kishore (India) and Virender Sharma (India); Player of the match: Dwayne Smith (Gujarat Lions) |
| 20:00 (D/N); Scorecard | Hashim Amla 104 (60); Dhawal Kulkarni 1/24 (4 overs) | | Dwayne Smith 74 (39); Sandeep Sharma 2/29 (4 overs) | Punjab Cricket Association IS Bindra Stadium, Mohali; Umpires: Nand Kishore (India) and Virender Sharma (India); Player of the match: Dwayne Smith (Gujarat Lions) |
| Gujarat Lions won the toss and elected to field. | | | | Punjab Cricket Association IS Bindra Stadium, Mohali; Umpires: Nand Kishore (India) and Virender Sharma (India); Player of the match: Dwayne Smith (Gujarat Lions) |

| 10 May | (H) Gujarat Lions; 195/5 (20 overs) | v | Delhi Daredevils; 197/8 (19.4 overs) | Delhi Daredevils won by 2 wickets |
| 20:00 (D/N); Scorecard | (H) Gujarat Lions; 195/5 (20 overs) | v | Delhi Daredevils; 197/8 (19.4 overs) | Green Park Stadium, Kanpur; Umpires: Yeshwant Barde (India) and Anil Chaudhary (India); Player of the match: Shreyas Iyer (Delhi Daredevils) |
| 20:00 (D/N); Scorecard | Aaron Finch 69 (39); Amit Mishra 1/27 (2 overs) | | Shreyas Iyer 96 (57); James Faulkner 2/39 (4 overs) | Green Park Stadium, Kanpur; Umpires: Yeshwant Barde (India) and Anil Chaudhary (India); Player of the match: Shreyas Iyer (Delhi Daredevils) |
| Delhi Daredevils won the toss and elected to field. | | | | Green Park Stadium, Kanpur; Umpires: Yeshwant Barde (India) and Anil Chaudhary (India); Player of the match: Shreyas Iyer (Delhi Daredevils) |

| 13 May | (H) Gujarat Lions; 154 (19.2 overs) | v | Sunrisers Hyderabad; 158/2 (18.1 overs) | Sunrisers Hyderabad won by 8 wickets |
| 16:00 (D/N); Scorecard | (H) Gujarat Lions; 154 (19.2 overs) | v | Sunrisers Hyderabad; 158/2 (18.1 overs) | Green Park Stadium, Kanpur; Umpires: Anil Chaudhary (India) and Nitin Menon (India); Player of the match: Mohammed Siraj (Sunrisers Hyderabad) |
| 16:00 (D/N); Scorecard | Ishan Kishan 61 (40); Mohammed Siraj 4/32 (4 overs) | | David Warner 69 (52)*; Praveen Kumar 2/22 (4 overs) | Green Park Stadium, Kanpur; Umpires: Anil Chaudhary (India) and Nitin Menon (India); Player of the match: Mohammed Siraj (Sunrisers Hyderabad) |
| Sunrisers Hyderabad won the toss and elected to field. | | | | Green Park Stadium, Kanpur; Umpires: Anil Chaudhary (India) and Nitin Menon (India); Player of the match: Mohammed Siraj (Sunrisers Hyderabad) |

== Support staff changes ==
- In February 2017, Mohammad Kaif was named assistant coach of Gujarat Lions.
