= 2017 Mumbai Indians season =

Indian Premier League cricket team season

Mumbai Indians
2017 season
- Coach: Mahela Jayawardene
- Captain: Rohit Sharma
- Ground(s): Wankhede Stadium, Mumbai
- IPL: Winner
- Most runs: Parthiv Patel (395)
- Most wickets: Jasprit Bumrah (20)

Mumbai Indians are a franchise cricket team based in Mumbai that play in the Indian Premier League (IPL). They are one of eight teams that competed in the 2017 Indian Premier League. Rohit Sharma was the captain of the team for the fifth season in succession, while Mahela Jayawardene was in his first season as the team's coach. The Mumbai Indians drew an average home attendance of 26,000 in the 2017 Indian Premier League. Mumbai Indians won the 2017 IPL Final by defeating Rising Pune Supergiants by 1 run thus winning their 3rd title.

== Offseason ==
- In November 2016, Mahela Jayawardene was appointed head coach, replacing Ricky Ponting.

== Auction ==
The player auction for the 2017 Indian Premier League was held on 20 February in Bangalore. The Mumbai Indians bought the following players at the auction:

- Nicholas Pooran
- Mitchell Johnson
- K Gowtham
- Karn Sharma
- Saurabh Tiwary
- Asela Gunaratne
- Kulwant Khejroliya

== Squad ==
- Players with international caps are listed in **bold**.

No.	Name	Nationality	Birth date	Batting style	Bowling style	Year signed	Salary	Notes
Batsmen
7	Siddhesh Lad	India	23 May 1992 (aged 24)	Right-handed	Right-arm off break	2015	₹10 lakh (US$15,000)	
9	**Ambati Rayudu**	India	23 September 1985 (aged 31)	Right-handed	Right-arm off break	2014 (since 2010)	₹4 crore (US$610,000)	Occasional wicket-keeper
15	**Saurabh Tiwary**	India	30 December 1989 (aged 27)	Left-handed		2017	₹30 lakh (US$46,000)	
27	Nitish Rana	India	27 December 1993 (aged 23)	Left-handed	Right-arm off break	2015	₹10 lakh (US$15,000)	
45	**Rohit Sharma**	India	30 April 1987 (aged 29)	Right-handed	Right-arm off break	2014 (since 2011)	₹12.5 crore (US$1.92 million)	Captain
54	**Lendl Simmons**	Trinidad and Tobago	25 January 1985 (aged 32)	Right-handed	Right-arm medium	2014	₹5.5 crore (US$840,000)	Overseas
All-rounders
11	**Hardik Pandya**	India	11 October 1993 (aged 23)	Right-handed	Right-arm medium-fast	2015	₹10 lakh (US$15,000)	
12	**Karn Sharma**	India	23 October 1987 (aged 29)	Left-handed	Right-arm leg break googly	2017	₹3.2 crore (US$490,000)	
19	Shreyas Gopal	India	4 September 1993 (aged 23)	Right-handed	Right-arm leg break	2014	₹10 lakh (US$15,000)	
24	Krunal Pandya	India	24 March 1991 (aged 26)	Left-handed	Slow left-arm orthodox	2016	₹2 crore (US$310,000)	
55	**Kieron Pollard**	Trinidad and Tobago	12 May 1987 (aged 29)	Right-handed	Right-arm medium-fast	2014 (since 2010)	₹9.7 crore (US$1.49 million)	Overseas/Vice-captain
	Deepak Punia	India	27 September 1993 (aged 23)	Right-handed	Right-arm medium	2016	₹10 lakh (US$15,000)	
	**Asela Gunaratne**	Sri Lanka	8 January 1986 (aged 31)	Right-handed	Right-arm medium	2017	₹30 lakh (US$46,000)	Overseas
Wicket-keepers
63	**Jos Buttler**	England	8 September 1990 (aged 26)	Right-handed		2016	₹3.8 crore (US$580,000)	Overseas
72	**Parthiv Patel**	India	9 March 1985 (aged 32)	Left-handed		2015	₹1.4 crore (US$210,000)	
	Jitesh Sharma	India	22 October 1993 (aged 23)	Right-handed		2016	₹10 lakh (US$15,000)	
	**Nicholas Pooran**	Trinidad and Tobago	2 October 1995 (aged 21)	Left-handed		2017	₹30 lakh (US$46,000)	Overseas
Bowlers
3	**Harbhajan Singh**	India	3 July 1980 (aged 36)	Right-handed	Right-arm off break	2014 (since 2008)	₹8 crore (US$1.23 million)	
16	Jagadeesha Suchith	India	16 January 1994 (aged 23)	Left-handed	Slow left-arm orthodox	2015	₹10 lakh (US$15,000)	
23	**Vinay Kumar**	India	12 February 1984 (aged 33)	Right-handed	Right-arm medium-fast	2015	₹2.99 crore (US$460,000)	
25	**Mitchell Johnson**	Australia	2 November 1981 (aged 35)	Left-handed	Left-arm fast-medium	2017	₹2 crore (US$310,000)	Overseas
38	**Tim Southee**	New Zealand	11 December 1988 (aged 28)	Right-handed	Right-arm fast-medium	2016	₹2.5 crore (US$380,000)	Overseas
81	**Mitchell McClenaghan**	New Zealand	11 June 1986 (aged 30)	Left-handed	Left-arm fast-medium	2015	₹30 lakh (US$46,000)	Overseas
93	**Jasprit Bumrah**	India	6 December 1993 (aged 23)	Right-handed	Right-arm fast-medium	2014 (since 2013)	₹1.2 crore (US$180,000)	
99	**Lasith Malinga**	Sri Lanka	28 August 1983 (aged 33)	Right-handed	Right-arm fast	2014 (since 2008)	₹8.1 crore (US$1.24 million)	Overseas
	Krishnappa Gowtham	India	20 October 1988 (aged 28)	Right-handed	Right-arm off break	2017	₹2 crore (US$310,000)	
	Kulwant Khejroliya	India	13 March 1992 (aged 25)	Left-handed	Left-arm medium-fast	2017	₹10 lakh (US$15,000)	

== Season standings ==
Pos	Team	Pld	W	L	NR	Pts	NRR	
1	Mumbai Indians (C)	14	10	4	0	20	0.784	Advanced to Qualifier 1
2	Rising Pune Supergiant (R)	14	9	5	0	18	0.176	Advanced to Qualifier 1
3	Sunrisers Hyderabad (4)	14	8	5	1	17	0.599	Advanced to the Eliminator
4	Kolkata Knight Riders (3)	14	8	6	0	16	0.641	Advanced to the Eliminator
5	Kings XI Punjab	14	7	7	0	14	−0.009	
6	Delhi Daredevils	14	6	8	0	12	−0.512	
7	Gujarat Lions	14	4	10	0	8	−0.412	
8	Royal Challengers Bangalore	14	3	10	1	7	−1.299	

Source: ESPNcricinfo
The four top ranked teams qualified for the playoffs

== Matches ==
6 April	Mumbai Indians; 184/8 (20 overs)	v	Rising Pune Supergiant (H); 187/3 (19.5 overs)	Rising Pune Supergiant won by 7 wickets
(D/N); Scorecard	Mumbai Indians; 184/8 (20 overs)	v	Rising Pune Supergiant (H); 187/3 (19.5 overs)	Maharashtra Cricket Association Stadium, Pune; Umpires: Nand Kishore (India) and Sundaram Ravi (India); Player of the match: Steve Smith (Rising Pune Supergiant)
(D/N); Scorecard	Jos Buttler 38 (19); Imran Tahir 3/28 (4 overs)		Steve Smith 84* (54); Tim Southee 1/34 (4 overs)	Maharashtra Cricket Association Stadium, Pune; Umpires: Nand Kishore (India) and Sundaram Ravi (India); Player of the match: Steve Smith (Rising Pune Supergiant)
Rising Pune Supergiant won the toss and elected to field.				Maharashtra Cricket Association Stadium, Pune; Umpires: Nand Kishore (India) and Sundaram Ravi (India); Player of the match: Steve Smith (Rising Pune Supergiant)

9 April	Kolkata Knight Riders; 178/7 (20 overs)	v	Mumbai Indians (H); 180/6 (19.5 overs)	Mumbai Indians won by 4 wickets
(D/N); Scorecard	Kolkata Knight Riders; 178/7 (20 overs)	v	Mumbai Indians (H); 180/6 (19.5 overs)	Wankhede Stadium, Mumbai; Umpires: Nitin Menon (India) and C. K. Nandan (India); Player of the match: Nitish Rana (Mumbai Indians)
(D/N); Scorecard	Manish Pandey 81* (47); Krunal Pandya 3/24 (4 overs)		Nitish Rana 50 (29); Ankit Rajpoot 3/37 (4 overs)	Wankhede Stadium, Mumbai; Umpires: Nitin Menon (India) and C. K. Nandan (India); Player of the match: Nitish Rana (Mumbai Indians)
Mumbai Indians won the toss and elected to field.				Wankhede Stadium, Mumbai; Umpires: Nitin Menon (India) and C. K. Nandan (India); Player of the match: Nitish Rana (Mumbai Indians)

12 April	Sunrisers Hyderabad; 158/8 (20 overs)	v	Mumbai Indians (H); 159/6 (18.4 overs)	Mumbai Indians won by 4 wickets
(D/N); Scorecard	Sunrisers Hyderabad; 158/8 (20 overs)	v	Mumbai Indians (H); 159/6 (18.4 overs)	Wankhede Stadium, Mumbai; Umpires: Nitin Menon (India) and C. K. Nandan (India); Player of the match: Jasprit Bumrah (Mumbai Indians)
(D/N); Scorecard	David Warner 49 (34); Jasprit Bumrah 3/24 (4 overs)		Nitish Rana 45 (36); Bhuvneshwar Kumar 3/21 (4 overs)	Wankhede Stadium, Mumbai; Umpires: Nitin Menon (India) and C. K. Nandan (India); Player of the match: Jasprit Bumrah (Mumbai Indians)
Mumbai Indians won the toss and elected to field.				Wankhede Stadium, Mumbai; Umpires: Nitin Menon (India) and C. K. Nandan (India); Player of the match: Jasprit Bumrah (Mumbai Indians)

14 April	(H) Royal Challengers Bangalore; 142/5 (20 overs)	v	Mumbai Indians; 145/6 (18.5 overs)	Mumbai Indians won by 4 wickets
(D/N); Scorecard	(H) Royal Challengers Bangalore; 142/5 (20 overs)	v	Mumbai Indians; 145/6 (18.5 overs)	M. Chinnaswamy Stadium, Bangalore; Umpires: K. N. Ananthapadmanabhan (India) and Anil Chaudhary (India); Player of the match: Kieron Pollard (Mumbai Indians)
(D/N); Scorecard	Virat Kohli 62 (47); Mitchell McClenaghan 2/20 (4 overs)		Kieron Pollard 70 (47); Samuel Badree 4/9 (4 overs)	M. Chinnaswamy Stadium, Bangalore; Umpires: K. N. Ananthapadmanabhan (India) and Anil Chaudhary (India); Player of the match: Kieron Pollard (Mumbai Indians)
Mumbai Indians won the toss and elected to field.; Samuel Badree (Royal Challengers Bangalore) took a hat-trick.				M. Chinnaswamy Stadium, Bangalore; Umpires: K. N. Ananthapadmanabhan (India) and Anil Chaudhary (India); Player of the match: Kieron Pollard (Mumbai Indians)

16 April	Gujarat Lions; 176/4 (20 overs)	v	Mumbai Indians (H); 177/4 (19.3 overs)	Mumbai Indians won by 6 wickets
16:00 (D/N); Scorecard	Gujarat Lions; 176/4 (20 overs)	v	Mumbai Indians (H); 177/4 (19.3 overs)	Wankhede Stadium, Mumbai; Umpires: Nand Kishore (India) and Sundaram Ravi (India); Player of the match: Nitish Rana (Mumbai Indians)
16:00 (D/N); Scorecard	Brendon McCullum 64 (44); Mitchell McClenaghan 2/24 (4 overs)		Nitish Rana 53 (36); Andrew Tye 2/34 (4 overs)	Wankhede Stadium, Mumbai; Umpires: Nand Kishore (India) and Sundaram Ravi (India); Player of the match: Nitish Rana (Mumbai Indians)
Mumbai Indians won the toss and elected to field.				Wankhede Stadium, Mumbai; Umpires: Nand Kishore (India) and Sundaram Ravi (India); Player of the match: Nitish Rana (Mumbai Indians)

20 April	(H) Kings XI Punjab; 198/4 (20 overs)	v	Mumbai Indians; 199/2 (15.3 overs)	Mumbai Indians won by 8 wickets
20:00 (D/N); Scorecard	(H) Kings XI Punjab; 198/4 (20 overs)	v	Mumbai Indians; 199/2 (15.3 overs)	Holkar Stadium, Indore; Umpires: Marais Erasmus (South Africa) and Chettithody Shamshuddin (India); Player of the match: Jos Buttler (Mumbai Indians)
20:00 (D/N); Scorecard	Hashim Amla 104* (60); Mitchell McClenaghan 2/46 (4 overs)		Jos Buttler 77 (37); Marcus Stoinis 1/28 (2 overs)	Holkar Stadium, Indore; Umpires: Marais Erasmus (South Africa) and Chettithody Shamshuddin (India); Player of the match: Jos Buttler (Mumbai Indians)
Mumbai Indians won the toss and elected to field.				Holkar Stadium, Indore; Umpires: Marais Erasmus (South Africa) and Chettithody Shamshuddin (India); Player of the match: Jos Buttler (Mumbai Indians)

22 April	(H) Mumbai Indians; 142/8 (20 overs)	v	Delhi Daredevils; 128/7 (20 overs)	Mumbai Indians won by 14 runs
20:00 (D/N); Scorecard	(H) Mumbai Indians; 142/8 (20 overs)	v	Delhi Daredevils; 128/7 (20 overs)	Wankhede Stadium, Mumbai; Umpires: Nand Kishore (India) and Sundaram Ravi (India); Player of the match: Mitchell McClenaghan (Mumbai Indians)
20:00 (D/N); Scorecard	Jos Buttler 28 (18); Amit Mishra 2/18 (4 overs)		Chris Morris 52* (41); Mitchell McClenaghan 3/24 (4 overs)	Wankhede Stadium, Mumbai; Umpires: Nand Kishore (India) and Sundaram Ravi (India); Player of the match: Mitchell McClenaghan (Mumbai Indians)
Delhi Daredevils won the toss and elected to field.				Wankhede Stadium, Mumbai; Umpires: Nand Kishore (India) and Sundaram Ravi (India); Player of the match: Mitchell McClenaghan (Mumbai Indians)

24 April	(H) Mumbai Indians; 157/8	v	Rising Pune Supergiant; 160/6	Rising Pune Supergiants won by 3 runs
20:00 (D/N); Scorecard	(H) Mumbai Indians; 157/8	v	Rising Pune Supergiant; 160/6	Wankhede Stadium, Mumbai; Umpires: Nand Kishore (India) and Sundaram Ravi (India); Player of the match: Ben Stokes (Rising Pune Supergiants)
20:00 (D/N); Scorecard	Rohit Sharma 58 (39); Jasprit Bumrah 2/29 (4 overs)		Rahul Tripathi 45 (31); Ben Stokes 2/21 (4 overs)	Wankhede Stadium, Mumbai; Umpires: Nand Kishore (India) and Sundaram Ravi (India); Player of the match: Ben Stokes (Rising Pune Supergiants)
Mumbai Indians won the toss and elected to field				Wankhede Stadium, Mumbai; Umpires: Nand Kishore (India) and Sundaram Ravi (India); Player of the match: Ben Stokes (Rising Pune Supergiants)

29 April	(H) Gujarat Lions; 153/9	v	Mumbai Indians; 153	Match tied (Mumbai Indians won the Super Over)
20:00 (D/N); Scorecard	(H) Gujarat Lions; 153/9	v	Mumbai Indians; 153	Saurashtra Cricket Association Stadium, Rajkot; Umpires: Anil Chaudhary (India) and Chris Gaffaney (New Zealand); Player of the match: Krunal Pandya (Mumbai Indians)
20:00 (D/N); Scorecard	Ishan Kishan 48 (35); Krunal Pandya 3/14 (4 overs)		Parthiv Patel 70 (44); Basil Thampi 2/29 (4 overs)	Saurashtra Cricket Association Stadium, Rajkot; Umpires: Anil Chaudhary (India) and Chris Gaffaney (New Zealand); Player of the match: Krunal Pandya (Mumbai Indians)
Gujarat Lions won the toss and elected to bat				Saurashtra Cricket Association Stadium, Rajkot; Umpires: Anil Chaudhary (India) and Chris Gaffaney (New Zealand); Player of the match: Krunal Pandya (Mumbai Indians)

1 May	(H) Mumbai Indians; 165/5	v	Royal Challengers Bangalore; 162/8	Mumbai Indians won by 5 wickets
16:00 (D/N); Scorecard	(H) Mumbai Indians; 165/5	v	Royal Challengers Bangalore; 162/8	Wankhede Stadium, Mumbai; Umpires: Anil Chaudhary (India) and Chris Gaffaney (New Zealand); Player of the match: Rohit Sharma (Mumbai Indians)
16:00 (D/N); Scorecard	Rohit Sharma 56* (37); Pawan Negi 2/17 (4 overs)		AB de Villiers 43 (27); Mitchell McClenaghan 3/34 (4 overs)	Wankhede Stadium, Mumbai; Umpires: Anil Chaudhary (India) and Chris Gaffaney (New Zealand); Player of the match: Rohit Sharma (Mumbai Indians)
Royal Challengers Bangalore won the toss and elected to bat				Wankhede Stadium, Mumbai; Umpires: Anil Chaudhary (India) and Chris Gaffaney (New Zealand); Player of the match: Rohit Sharma (Mumbai Indians)

6 May	(H) Delhi Daredevils; 66	v	Mumbai Indians; 212/3	Mumbai Indians won by 146 runs
20:00 (D/N); Scorecard	(H) Delhi Daredevils; 66	v	Mumbai Indians; 212/3	Feroz Shah Kotla, Delhi; Umpires: Nitin Menon (India) and C. K. Nandan (India); Player of the match: Lendl Simmons (Mumbai Indians)
20:00 (D/N); Scorecard	Karun Nair 21 (15); Karn Sharma 3/11 (3.4 overs)		Lendl Simmons 66 (43); Kagiso Rabada 1/33 (4 overs)	Feroz Shah Kotla, Delhi; Umpires: Nitin Menon (India) and C. K. Nandan (India); Player of the match: Lendl Simmons (Mumbai Indians)
Delhi Daredevils won the toss and elected to bat				Feroz Shah Kotla, Delhi; Umpires: Nitin Menon (India) and C. K. Nandan (India); Player of the match: Lendl Simmons (Mumbai Indians)

8 May	(H) Sunrisers Hyderabad; 140/3	v	Mumbai Indians; 138/7	Sunrisers Hyderabad won by 7 wickets
20:00 (D/N); Scorecard	(H) Sunrisers Hyderabad; 140/3	v	Mumbai Indians; 138/7	Rajiv Gandhi International Cricket Stadium, Hyderabad; Umpires: K. N. Ananthapadmanabhan (India) and Marais Erasmus (South Africa); Player of the match: Shikhar Dhawan (Sunrisers Hyderabad)
20:00 (D/N); Scorecard	Shikhar Dhawan 62 (34); Mitchell McClenaghan 1/26 (4 overs)		Rohit Sharma 67 (45); Siddarth Kaul 3/24 (4 overs)	Rajiv Gandhi International Cricket Stadium, Hyderabad; Umpires: K. N. Ananthapadmanabhan (India) and Marais Erasmus (South Africa); Player of the match: Shikhar Dhawan (Sunrisers Hyderabad)
Mumbai Indians won the toss and elected to bat				Rajiv Gandhi International Cricket Stadium, Hyderabad; Umpires: K. N. Ananthapadmanabhan (India) and Marais Erasmus (South Africa); Player of the match: Shikhar Dhawan (Sunrisers Hyderabad)

11 May	(H) Mumbai Indians; 223/6	v	Kings XI Punjab; 230/3	Kings XI Punjab won by 7 runs
20:00 (D/N); Scorecard	(H) Mumbai Indians; 223/6	v	Kings XI Punjab; 230/3	Wankhede Stadium, Mumbai; Umpires: Abhijit Deshmukh (India) and Nand Kishore (India); Player of the match: Wriddhiman Saha (Kings XI Punjab)
20:00 (D/N); Scorecard	Lendl Simmons 59 (32); Mohit Sharma 2/57 (4 overs)		Wriddhiman Saha 93* (55); Jasprit Bumrah 1/24 (4 overs)	Wankhede Stadium, Mumbai; Umpires: Abhijit Deshmukh (India) and Nand Kishore (India); Player of the match: Wriddhiman Saha (Kings XI Punjab)
Mumbai Indians won the toss and elected to bowl				Wankhede Stadium, Mumbai; Umpires: Abhijit Deshmukh (India) and Nand Kishore (India); Player of the match: Wriddhiman Saha (Kings XI Punjab)

13 May	(H) Kolkata Knight Riders; 164/8	v	Mumbai Indians; 173/5	Mumbai Indians won by 9 runs
20:00 (D/N); Scorecard	(H) Kolkata Knight Riders; 164/8	v	Mumbai Indians; 173/5	Eden Gardens, Kolkata; Umpires: Nand Kishore (India) and Sundaram Ravi (India); Player of the match: Ambati Rayudu (Mumbai Indians)
20:00 (D/N); Scorecard	Manish Pandey 33 (33); Hardik Pandya 2/22 (4 overs)		Ambati Rayudu 63 (37); Trent Boult 2/30 (4 overs)	Eden Gardens, Kolkata; Umpires: Nand Kishore (India) and Sundaram Ravi (India); Player of the match: Ambati Rayudu (Mumbai Indians)
Kolkata Knight Riders won the toss and elected to bowl				Eden Gardens, Kolkata; Umpires: Nand Kishore (India) and Sundaram Ravi (India); Player of the match: Ambati Rayudu (Mumbai Indians)

== Playoffs ==
Qualifier 1

16 May
20:00 (D/N)
Scorecard

Rising Pune Supergiants; 162/4 (20 overs)	v	(H) Mumbai Indians; 142 (20 overs)
Manoj Tiwary 58 (48); Lasith Malinga 1/14 (3 overs)		Parthiv Patel 52 (40); Washington Sundar 3/16 (4 overs)

Rising Pune Supergiants won by 20 runs
Wankhede Stadium, Mumbai
Umpires: Sundaram Ravi (India) and Chettithody Shamshuddin (India)
Player of the match: Washington Sundar (Rising Pune Supergiants)

- Mumbai Indians won the toss and elected to bowl

Qualifier 2

19 May
20:00 (D/N)
Scorecard

Mumbai Indians; 111/4 (14.3 overs)	v	Kolkata Knight Riders; 107 (18.5 overs)
Krunal Pandya 45 (30); Piyush Chawla 2/34 (4 overs)		Suryakumar Yadav 31 (25); Karn Sharma 4/16 (4 overs)

Mumbai Indians won by 6 wickets
M. Chinnaswamy Stadium, Bangalore
Umpires: Nigel Llong (England) and Chettithody Shamshuddin (India)
Player of the match: Karn Sharma (Mumbai Indians)

- Mumbai Indians won the toss and elected to bowl

=== Final ===
21 May
20:00 (D/N)
Scorecard

Rising Pune Supergiants; 128/6 (20 overs)	v	Mumbai Indians; 129/8 (20 overs)
Steve Smith 51 (50); Mitchell Johnson 3/26 (4 overs)		Krunal Pandya 47 (38); Jaydev Unadkat 2/19 (4 overs)

Mumbai Indians won by 1 run
Rajiv Gandhi International Cricket Stadium, Hyderabad
Umpires: Nigel Llong (England) and Sundaram Ravi (India)
Player of the match: Krunal Pandya (Mumbai Indians)

- Mumbai Indians won the toss and elected to bat
