= 2017 Kolkata Knight Riders season =

Indian Premier League cricket team season

Kolkata Knight Riders
2017 season
- Coach: Jacques Kallis
- Captain: Gautam Gambhir
- Ground(s): Eden Gardens, Kolkata
- IPL: 3rd
- Most runs: Gautam Gambhir (498)
- Most wickets: Chris Woakes (17)

Kolkata Knight Riders (KKR) are a franchise cricket team based in Kolkata, India, which plays in the Indian Premier League (IPL). They are one of the eight teams that competed in the 2017 IPL edition. They were captained by Gautam Gambhir, while former Knight Riders all-rounder Jacques Kallis was in his third season as the team's head coach.

== Pre-season ==
- In December 2016, Wasim Akram stepped down as the bowling coach and mentor, citing "professional commitments and time constraints."

== Player auction ==
The player auction for the 2017 Indian Premier League was held on 20 February in Bangalore.

The Knight Riders bought the following players at the auction:

- Trent Boult
- Chris Woakes
- Rishi Dhawan
- Nathan Coulter-Nile
- Rovman Powell
- R Sanjay Yadav
- Ishank Jaggi
- Darren Bravo
- Sayan Ghosh

In April the side signed New Zealander Colin de Grandhomme as a replacement for Andre Russell who was banned for one year in January 2017 for a violation of doping codes.

== Squad ==
- Players with international caps are listed in **bold**.

No.	Name	Nationality	Birth date	Batting style	Bowling style	Year signed	Salary	Notes
Batsmen
9	**Manish Pandey**	India	10 September 1989 (aged 27)	Right-handed	Right-arm off break	2014	₹1.7 crore (US$260,000)	
23	**Gautam Gambhir**	India	14 October 1981 (aged 35)	Left-handed	Right-arm leg break	2014 (since 2011)	₹10 crore (US$1.54 million)	Captain
37	**Robin Uthappa**	India	11 September 1985 (aged 31)	Right-handed	Right-arm medium	2014	₹5 crore (US$770,000)	Occasional wicketkeeper
46	**Darren Bravo**	Trinidad and Tobago	6 February 1989 (aged 28)	Left-handed	Right-arm medium	2017	₹50 lakh (US$77,000)	Overseas
50	**Chris Lynn**	Australia	10 April 1990 (aged 26)	Right-handed	Slow left-arm orthodox	2014	₹1.3 crore (US$200,000)	Overseas
72	Ishank Jaggi	India	27 January 1989 (aged 28)	Right-handed	Right-arm leg break	2017	₹10 lakh (US$15,000)	
212	Suryakumar Yadav	India	14 September 1990 (aged 26)	Right-handed	Right-arm medium	2014	₹70 lakh (US$107,000)	Vice-captain
All-rounders
01	**Rishi Dhawan**	India	19 February 1990 (aged 27)	Right-handed	Right-arm medium-fast	2017	₹55 lakh (US$84,000)	
8	**Chris Woakes**	England	2 March 1989 (aged 28)	Right-handed	Right-arm fast-medium	2017	₹4.2 crore (US$640,000)	Overseas
12	**Andre Russell**	Jamaica	29 April 1988 (aged 28)	Right-handed	Right-arm fast-medium	2014	₹60 lakh (US$92,000)	Overseas
24	**Yusuf Pathan**	India	17 November 1982 (aged 34)	Right-handed	Right-arm off break	2014 (since 2011)	₹3.25 crore (US$500,000)	
52	**Rovman Powell**	Jamaica	23 July 1993 (aged 23)	Right-handed	Right-arm fast-medium	2017	₹30 lakh (US$46,000)	Overseas
75	**Shakib Al Hasan**	Bangladesh	24 March 1987 (aged 30)	Left-handed	Slow left-arm orthodox	2014 (since 2011)	₹2.8 crore (US$430,000)	Overseas
77	**Colin de Grandhomme**	New Zealand	22 July 1986 (aged 30)	Right-handed	Right-arm fast-medium	2017	Replacement signing	Overseas
	Sanjay Yadav	India	10 May 1995 (aged 21)	Left-handed	Slow left-arm orthodox	2017	₹10 lakh (US$15,000)	
Wicket-keepers
21	Sheldon Jackson	India	27 September 1986 (aged 30)	Right-handed		2015	₹15 lakh (US$23,000)	
Bowlers
03	Ankit Rajpoot	India	4 December 1993 (aged 23)	Right-handed	Right-arm medium-fast	2016	₹1.5 crore (US$230,000)	
10	**Trent Boult**	New Zealand	22 July 1989 (aged 27)	Right-handed	Left-arm fast	2017	₹5 crore (US$770,000)	Overseas
11	**Piyush Chawla**	India	24 December 1988 (aged 28)	Left-handed	Right-arm leg break	2014	₹4.25 crore (US$650,000)	
13	**Nathan Coulter-Nile**	Australia	11 October 1987 (aged 29)	Right-handed	Right-arm fast	2017	₹3.5 crore (US$540,000)	Overseas
18	**Kuldeep Yadav**	India	14 December 1994 (aged 22)	Left-handed	Slow left-arm wrist-spin	2014	₹40 lakh (US$61,000)	
19	**Umesh Yadav**	India	25 October 1987 (aged 29)	Right-handed	Right-arm fast	2014	₹2.6 crore (US$400,000)	
74	**Sunil Narine**	Trinidad and Tobago	26 May 1988 (aged 28)	Left-handed	Right-arm off break	2012	₹8 crore (US$1.23 million)	Overseas
	Sayan Ghosh	India	16 September 1992 (aged 24)	Right-handed	Right-arm medium	2017	₹10 lakh (US$15,000)	

== Season standings ==
Pos	Team	Pld	W	L	NR	Pts	NRR	
1	Mumbai Indians (C)	14	10	4	0	20	0.784	Advanced to Qualifier 1
2	Rising Pune Supergiant (R)	14	9	5	0	18	0.176	Advanced to Qualifier 1
3	Sunrisers Hyderabad (4)	14	8	5	1	17	0.599	Advanced to the Eliminator
4	Kolkata Knight Riders (3)	14	8	6	0	16	0.641	Advanced to the Eliminator
5	Kings XI Punjab	14	7	7	0	14	−0.009	
6	Delhi Daredevils	14	6	8	0	12	−0.512	
7	Gujarat Lions	14	4	10	0	8	−0.412	
8	Royal Challengers Bangalore	14	3	10	1	7	−1.299	

Source: ESPNcricinfo
The four top ranked teams qualified for the playoffs

== Matches ==
7 April	(H) Gujarat Lions; 183/4 (20 overs)	v	Kolkata Knight Riders; 184/0 (14.5 overs)	Kolkata Knight Riders won by 10 wickets
(D/N); Scorecard	(H) Gujarat Lions; 183/4 (20 overs)	v	Kolkata Knight Riders; 184/0 (14.5 overs)	Saurashtra Cricket Association Stadium, Rajkot; Umpires: Nitin Menon (India) and C. K. Nandan (India); Player of the match: Chris Lynn (Kolkata Knight Riders)
(D/N); Scorecard	Suresh Raina 68* (51); Kuldeep Yadav 2/25 (4 overs)		Chris Lynn 93* (41); Praveen Kumar 0/13 (2 overs)	Saurashtra Cricket Association Stadium, Rajkot; Umpires: Nitin Menon (India) and C. K. Nandan (India); Player of the match: Chris Lynn (Kolkata Knight Riders)
Kolkata Knight Riders won the toss and elected to field.; This was the highest total successfully chased without losing a wicket in a T20 match.				Saurashtra Cricket Association Stadium, Rajkot; Umpires: Nitin Menon (India) and C. K. Nandan (India); Player of the match: Chris Lynn (Kolkata Knight Riders)

9 April	Kolkata Knight Riders; 178/7 (20 overs)	v	Mumbai Indians (H); 180/6 (19.5 overs)	Mumbai Indians won by 4 wickets
(D/N); Scorecard	Kolkata Knight Riders; 178/7 (20 overs)	v	Mumbai Indians (H); 180/6 (19.5 overs)	Wankhede Stadium, Mumbai; Umpires: Nitin Menon (India) and C. K. Nandan (India); Player of the match: Nitish Rana (Mumbai Indians)
(D/N); Scorecard	Manish Pandey 81* (47); Krunal Pandya 3/24 (4 overs)		Nitish Rana 50 (29); Ankit Rajpoot 3/37 (4 overs)	Wankhede Stadium, Mumbai; Umpires: Nitin Menon (India) and C. K. Nandan (India); Player of the match: Nitish Rana (Mumbai Indians)
Mumbai Indians won the toss and elected to field.				Wankhede Stadium, Mumbai; Umpires: Nitin Menon (India) and C. K. Nandan (India); Player of the match: Nitish Rana (Mumbai Indians)

13 April	Kings XI Punjab; 170/9 (20 overs)	v	Kolkata Knight Riders (H); 171/2 (16.3 overs)	Kolkata Knight Riders won by 8 wickets
(D/N); Scorecard	Kings XI Punjab; 170/9 (20 overs)	v	Kolkata Knight Riders (H); 171/2 (16.3 overs)	Eden Gardens, Kolkata; Umpires: Abhijit Deshmukh (India) and Nigel Llong (England); Player of the match: Sunil Narine (Kolkata Knight Riders)
(D/N); Scorecard	Manan Vohra 28 (19); David Miller 28 (19); Umesh Yadav 4/33 (4 overs)		Gautam Gambhir 72* (49); Varun Aaron 1/23 (2 overs)	Eden Gardens, Kolkata; Umpires: Abhijit Deshmukh (India) and Nigel Llong (England); Player of the match: Sunil Narine (Kolkata Knight Riders)
Kolkata Knight Riders won the toss and elected to field.				Eden Gardens, Kolkata; Umpires: Abhijit Deshmukh (India) and Nigel Llong (England); Player of the match: Sunil Narine (Kolkata Knight Riders)

15 April	(H) Kolkata Knight Riders; 172/6 (20 overs)	v	Sunrisers Hyderabad; 155/6 (20 overs)	Kolkata Knight Riders won by 17 runs
(D/N); Scorecard	(H) Kolkata Knight Riders; 172/6 (20 overs)	v	Sunrisers Hyderabad; 155/6 (20 overs)	Eden Gardens, Kolkata; Umpires: Anil Dandekar (India) and Nigel Llong (England); Player of the match: Robin Uthappa (Kolkata Knight Riders)
(D/N); Scorecard	Robin Uthappa 68 (39); Bhuvneshwar Kumar 3/20 (4 overs)		Yuvraj Singh 26 (16); Chris Woakes 2/49 (4 overs)	Eden Gardens, Kolkata; Umpires: Anil Dandekar (India) and Nigel Llong (England); Player of the match: Robin Uthappa (Kolkata Knight Riders)
Sunrisers Hyderabad won the toss and elected to field.				Eden Gardens, Kolkata; Umpires: Anil Dandekar (India) and Nigel Llong (England); Player of the match: Robin Uthappa (Kolkata Knight Riders)

17 April	(H) Delhi Daredevils; 168/7 (20 overs)	v	Kolkata Knight Riders; 169/6 (19.5 overs)	Kolkata Knight Riders won by 4 wickets
16:00 (D/N); Scorecard	(H) Delhi Daredevils; 168/7 (20 overs)	v	Kolkata Knight Riders; 169/6 (19.5 overs)	Feroz Shah Kotla, Delhi; Umpires: Nitin Menon (India) and C. K. Nandan (India); Player of the match: Manish Pandey (Kolkata Knight Riders)
16:00 (D/N); Scorecard	Sanju Samson 39 (25); Nathan Coulter-Nile 3/22 (4 overs)		Manish Pandey 69* (49); Zaheer Khan 2/28 (4 overs)	Feroz Shah Kotla, Delhi; Umpires: Nitin Menon (India) and C. K. Nandan (India); Player of the match: Manish Pandey (Kolkata Knight Riders)
Delhi Daredevils won the toss and elected to bat.				Feroz Shah Kotla, Delhi; Umpires: Nitin Menon (India) and C. K. Nandan (India); Player of the match: Manish Pandey (Kolkata Knight Riders)

21 April	(H) Kolkata Knight Riders; 187/5 (20)	v	Gujarat Lions; 188/6 (18.2)	Gujarat Lions won by 4 wickets.
20:00 (D/N); Scorecard	(H) Kolkata Knight Riders; 187/5 (20)	v	Gujarat Lions; 188/6 (18.2)	Eden Gardens, Kolkata; Umpires: Nitin Menon (India) and Chris Gaffaney (New Zealand); Player of the match: Suresh Raina (Gujarat Lions)
20:00 (D/N); Scorecard	Robin Uthappa 72 (48); Suresh Raina 1/11 (2 overs)		Suresh Raina 84 (46); Kuldeep Yadav 2/33 (4 overs)	Eden Gardens, Kolkata; Umpires: Nitin Menon (India) and Chris Gaffaney (New Zealand); Player of the match: Suresh Raina (Gujarat Lions)
Gujarat Lions won the toss and elected to field.				Eden Gardens, Kolkata; Umpires: Nitin Menon (India) and Chris Gaffaney (New Zealand); Player of the match: Suresh Raina (Gujarat Lions)

23 April	(H) Kolkata Knight Riders; 131/10 (19.3)	v	Royal Challengers Bangalore; 49/10 (9.4)	Kolkata Knight Riders won by 82 runs.
20:00 (D/N); Scorecard	(H) Kolkata Knight Riders; 131/10 (19.3)	v	Royal Challengers Bangalore; 49/10 (9.4)	Eden Gardens, Kolkata; Umpires: Chris Gaffaney (New Zealand) and C. K. Nandan (India); Player of the match: Nathan Coulter-Nile (Kolkata Knight Riders)
20:00 (D/N); Scorecard	Sunil Narine 34 (17); Yuzvendra Chahal 3/16 (4 overs)		Kedar Jadhav 9 (7); Colin de Grandhomme 3/4 (1.4 overs); Chris Woakes 3/6 (2 overs); Nathan Coulter-Nile 3/21 (3 overs)	Eden Gardens, Kolkata; Umpires: Chris Gaffaney (New Zealand) and C. K. Nandan (India); Player of the match: Nathan Coulter-Nile (Kolkata Knight Riders)
Royal Challengers Bangalore won the toss and elected to field.; Royal Challengers Bangalore's 49 runs was the lowest ever total in the IPL. Royal Challengers Bangalore's innings of 9.4 overs was the shortest ever in the IPL. This was the first match in the IPL where none of the batmen in a side were able to get in to double digits. This was only the second time both sides in an IPL match were all out.				Eden Gardens, Kolkata; Umpires: Chris Gaffaney (New Zealand) and C. K. Nandan (India); Player of the match: Nathan Coulter-Nile (Kolkata Knight Riders)

26 April	(H) Rising Pune Supergiant; 182/5 (20)	v	Kolkata Knight Riders; 184/3 (18.1)	Kolkata Knight Riders won by 7 wickets.
20:00 (D/N); Scorecard	(H) Rising Pune Supergiant; 182/5 (20)	v	Kolkata Knight Riders; 184/3 (18.1)	Maharashtra Cricket Association Stadium, Pune; Umpires: Anil Dandekar (India) and Nigel Llong (England); Player of the match: Robin Uthappa (Kolkata Knight Riders)
20:00 (D/N); Scorecard	Steve Smith 51 (37); Kuldeep Yadav 2/31 (4 overs)		Robin Uthappa 87 (47); Dan Christian 1/31 (4 overs)	Maharashtra Cricket Association Stadium, Pune; Umpires: Anil Dandekar (India) and Nigel Llong (England); Player of the match: Robin Uthappa (Kolkata Knight Riders)
Kolkata Knight Riders won the toss and elected to field.				Maharashtra Cricket Association Stadium, Pune; Umpires: Anil Dandekar (India) and Nigel Llong (England); Player of the match: Robin Uthappa (Kolkata Knight Riders)

28 April	(H) Kolkata Knight Riders; 161/3 (16.2)	v	Delhi Daredevils; 160/6 (20)	Kolkata Knight Riders won by 7 wickets.
16:00 (D/N); Scorecard	(H) Kolkata Knight Riders; 161/3 (16.2)	v	Delhi Daredevils; 160/6 (20)	Eden Gardens, Kolkata; Umpires: Nigel Llong (England) and Sundaram Ravi (India); Player of the match: Gautam Gambhir (Kolkata Knight Riders)
16:00 (D/N); Scorecard	Gautam Gambhir 71 (52); Kagiso Rabada 2/20 (3.2 overs)		Sanju Samson 60 (38); Nathan Coulter-Nile 3/34 (4 overs)	Eden Gardens, Kolkata; Umpires: Nigel Llong (England) and Sundaram Ravi (India); Player of the match: Gautam Gambhir (Kolkata Knight Riders)
Kolkata Knight Riders won the toss and elected to field.				Eden Gardens, Kolkata; Umpires: Nigel Llong (England) and Sundaram Ravi (India); Player of the match: Gautam Gambhir (Kolkata Knight Riders)

30 April	(H) Sunrisers Hyderabad; 209/3 (20)	v	Kolkata Knight Riders; 161/7 (20)	Sunrisers Hyderabad won by 48 runs.
20:00 (D/N); Scorecard	(H) Sunrisers Hyderabad; 209/3 (20)	v	Kolkata Knight Riders; 161/7 (20)	Rajiv Gandhi International Cricket Stadium, Hyderabad; Umpires: Anil Dandekar (India) and Sundaram Ravi (India); Player of the match: David Warner (Sunrisers Hyderabad)
20:00 (D/N); Scorecard	David Warner 126 (59); Chris Woakes 1/46 (4 overs)		Robin Uthappa 53 (28); Mohammed Siraj 2/26 (4 overs)	Rajiv Gandhi International Cricket Stadium, Hyderabad; Umpires: Anil Dandekar (India) and Sundaram Ravi (India); Player of the match: David Warner (Sunrisers Hyderabad)
Kolkata Knight Riders won the toss and elected to field.				Rajiv Gandhi International Cricket Stadium, Hyderabad; Umpires: Anil Dandekar (India) and Sundaram Ravi (India); Player of the match: David Warner (Sunrisers Hyderabad)

3 May	(H) Kolkata Knight Riders; 155/8 (20)	v	Rising Pune Supergiant; 158/6 (19.2)	Rising Pune Supergiant won by 4 wickets.
20:00 (D/N); Scorecard	(H) Kolkata Knight Riders; 155/8 (20)	v	Rising Pune Supergiant; 158/6 (19.2)	Eden Gardens, Kolkata; Umpires: K.N. Ananthapadmanabhan (India) and Nand Kishore; Player of the match: Rahul Tripathi (Rising Pune Supergiant)
20:00 (D/N); Scorecard	Manish Pandey 37 (32); Jaydev Unadkat 2/28 (4 overs)		Rahul Tripathi 93 (52); Chris Woakes 3/18 (4 overs)	Eden Gardens, Kolkata; Umpires: K.N. Ananthapadmanabhan (India) and Nand Kishore; Player of the match: Rahul Tripathi (Rising Pune Supergiant)
Rising Pune Supergiant won the toss and elected to field.				Eden Gardens, Kolkata; Umpires: K.N. Ananthapadmanabhan (India) and Nand Kishore; Player of the match: Rahul Tripathi (Rising Pune Supergiant)

7 May	(H) Royal Challengers Bangalore; 158/6 (20)	v	Kolkata Knight Riders; 159/4 (15.1)	Kolkata Knight Riders won by 6 wickets.
16:00 (D/N); Scorecard	(H) Royal Challengers Bangalore; 158/6 (20)	v	Kolkata Knight Riders; 159/4 (15.1)	M. Chinnaswamy Stadium, Bangalore; Umpires: Anil Dandekar (India) and Chettithody Shamshuddin (India); Player of the match: Sunil Narine (Kolkata Knight Riders)
16:00 (D/N); Scorecard	Travis Head 75 (47); Umesh Yadav 3/36 (4 overs)		Sunil Narine 54 (17); Pawan Negi 2/21 (3.1 overs)	M. Chinnaswamy Stadium, Bangalore; Umpires: Anil Dandekar (India) and Chettithody Shamshuddin (India); Player of the match: Sunil Narine (Kolkata Knight Riders)
Kolkata Knight Riders won the toss and elected to field.				M. Chinnaswamy Stadium, Bangalore; Umpires: Anil Dandekar (India) and Chettithody Shamshuddin (India); Player of the match: Sunil Narine (Kolkata Knight Riders)

9 May	(H) Kings XI Punjab; 167/6 (20 overs)	v	Kolkata Knight Riders; 153/6 (20 overs)	Kings XI Punjab won by 14 runs
20:00 (D/N); Scorecard	(H) Kings XI Punjab; 167/6 (20 overs)	v	Kolkata Knight Riders; 153/6 (20 overs)	Punjab Cricket Association IS Bindra Stadium, Mohali; Umpires: Nand Kishore (India) and Sundaram Ravi (India); Player of the match: Mohit Sharma (Kings XI Punjab)
20:00 (D/N); Scorecard	Glenn Maxwell 44 (25); Chris Woakes 2/20 (4 overs)		Chris Lynn 84 (52); Rahul Tewatia 2/18 (4 overs)	Punjab Cricket Association IS Bindra Stadium, Mohali; Umpires: Nand Kishore (India) and Sundaram Ravi (India); Player of the match: Mohit Sharma (Kings XI Punjab)
Kolkata Knight Riders won the toss and elected to field.				Punjab Cricket Association IS Bindra Stadium, Mohali; Umpires: Nand Kishore (India) and Sundaram Ravi (India); Player of the match: Mohit Sharma (Kings XI Punjab)

13 May	Mumbai Indians; 173/5 (20 overs)	v	Kolkata Knight Riders (H); 164/8 (20 overs)	Mumbai Indians won by 9 runs
20:00 (D/N); Scorecard	Mumbai Indians; 173/5 (20 overs)	v	Kolkata Knight Riders (H); 164/8 (20 overs)	Eden Gardens, Kolkata; Umpires: Nand Kishore (India) and Sundaram Ravi (India); Player of the match: Ambati Rayudu (Mumbai Indians)
20:00 (D/N); Scorecard	Ambati Rayudu 63 (37); Trent Boult 2/30 (4 overs)		Manish Pandey 33 (33); Hardik Pandya 2/22 (4 overs)	Eden Gardens, Kolkata; Umpires: Nand Kishore (India) and Sundaram Ravi (India); Player of the match: Ambati Rayudu (Mumbai Indians)
Kolkata Knight Riders won the toss and elected to field.				Eden Gardens, Kolkata; Umpires: Nand Kishore (India) and Sundaram Ravi (India); Player of the match: Ambati Rayudu (Mumbai Indians)
