= 2017 Delhi Daredevils season =

Indian Premier League cricket team season

Delhi Daredevils
2017 season
- Coach: Paddy Upton
- Captain: Zaheer Khan
- Ground(s): Feroz Shah Kotla, Delhi
- Most runs: Sanju Samson
- Most wickets: Pat Cummins

Delhi Daredevils (DD) are a cricket team based in Delhi, India. They play in the Indian Premier League (IPL), and were one of the eight teams that competed in the 2017 Indian Premier League.

== Auction ==
The player auction for the 2017 Indian Premier League was held on 20 February in Bangalore. The Delhi Daredevils bought the following players at the auction:

- Angelo Mathews
- Corey Anderson
- Kagiso Rabada
- Pat Cummins
- Ankit Bawne
- Aditya Tare
- M Ashwin
- Navdeep Saini
- Shashank Singh

In April 2017, the Daredevils also signed Australian Ben Hilfenhaus as a replacement for JP Duminy who withdrew from the season for personal reasons. Quinton de Kock was also ruled out of the tournament in March 2017 due to an injury, but no replacement was named for him.

== Squad ==
- Players with international caps are listed in **bold**.

No.	Name	Nationality	Birth date	Batting style	Bowling style	Year signed	Salary	Notes
Batsmen
17	Ankit Bawne	India	17 December 1992 (aged 24)	Right-handed	Right-arm off break	2017	₹10 lakh (US$15,000)	
21	**JP Duminy**	South Africa	14 April 1984 (aged 32)	Left-handed	Right-arm off break	2014	₹2.2 crore (US$340,000)	Overseas, Vice Captain
41	Shreyas Iyer	India	6 December 1994 (aged 22)	Right-handed	Right-arm leg break	2015	₹2.6 crore (US$400,000)	
69	**Karun Nair**	India	6 December 1991 (aged 25)	Right-handed	Right-arm off break	2016	₹4 crore (US$610,000)	
77	**Marlon Samuels**	Jamaica	5 February 1981 (aged 36)	Right-handed	Right-arm off break	2017	Replacement signing	
	Pratyush Singh	India	4 September 1994 (aged 22)	Right-handed	Right-arm leg break googly	2016	₹10 lakh (US$15,000)	
All-rounders
2	**Chris Morris**	South Africa	30 April 1987 (aged 29)	Right-handed	Right-arm fast-medium	2016	₹7 crore (US$1.07 million)	Overseas
19	**Jayant Yadav**	India	22 January 1990 (aged 27)	Right-handed	Right-arm off break	2014	₹10 lakh (US$15,000)	
22	**Angelo Mathews**	Sri Lanka	2 June 1987 (aged 29)	Right-handed	Right-arm fast-medium	2017	₹2 crore (US$310,000)	Overseas
26	**Carlos Brathwaite**	Barbados	18 July 1988 (aged 28)	Right-handed	Right-arm fast-medium	2016	₹4.2 crore (US$640,000)	Overseas
78	**Corey Anderson**	New Zealand	13 December 1990 (aged 26)	Left-handed	Left-arm medium-fast	2017	₹1 crore (US$150,000)	Overseas
	Shashank Singh	India	21 November 1991 (aged 25)	Right-handed	Right-arm off break	2017	₹10 lakh (US$15,000)	
Wicket-keepers
7	**Sam Billings**	England	15 June 1991 (aged 25)	Right-handed		2016	₹30 lakh (US$46,000)	Overseas
8	**Sanju Samson**	India	11 November 1994 (aged 22)	Right-handed		2016	₹4.2 crore (US$640,000)	
12	**Quinton de Kock**	South Africa	17 December 1992 (aged 24)	Left-handed		2014	₹3.5 crore (US$540,000)	Overseas
27	Aditya Tare	India	7 November 1987 (aged 29)	Right-handed		2017	₹25 lakh (US$38,000)	
777	**Rishabh Pant**	India	4 October 1997 (aged 19)	Left-handed	Right-arm medium	2016	₹1.9 crore (US$290,000)	
Bowlers
11	**Mohammed Shami**	India	9 March 1990 (aged 27)	Right-handed	Right-arm fast	2014	₹4.25 crore (US$650,000)	
25	**Kagiso Rabada**	South Africa	25 May 1995 (aged 21)	Left-handed	Right-arm fast	2017	₹5 crore (US$770,000)	Overseas
30	**Pat Cummins**	Australia	8 May 1993 (aged 23)	Right-handed	Right-arm fast	2017	₹4.5 crore (US$690,000)	Overseas
34	**Zaheer Khan**	India	7 October 1978 (aged 38)	Right-handed	Left-arm fast-medium	2015	₹4 crore (US$610,000)	Captain
88	Shahbaz Nadeem	India	12 August 1989 (aged 27)	Right-handed	Slow left-arm orthodox	2014	₹85 lakh (US$130,000)	
99	**Amit Mishra**	India	24 November 1982 (aged 34)	Right-handed	Right-arm leg break	2015	₹3.5 crore (US$540,000)	
313	Khaleel Ahmed	India	5 December 1997 (aged 19)	Right-handed	Left-arm fast-medium	2016	₹10 lakh (US$15,000)	
	Chama Milind	India	4 September 1994 (aged 22)	Left-handed	Left-arm medium-fast	2016	₹10 lakh (US$15,000)	
	Murugan Ashwin	India	8 September 1990 (aged 26)	Right-handed	Right-arm leg break	2017	₹1 crore (US$150,000)	
	Navdeep Saini	India	23 September 1992 (aged 24)	Right-handed	Right-arm fast	2017	₹10 lakh (US$15,000)	
	**Ben Hilfenhaus**	Australia	15 March 1983 (aged 34)	Right-handed	Right-arm fast-medium	2017	Replacement signing	Overseas

== Season standings ==
Pos	Team	Pld	W	L	NR	Pts	NRR	
1	Mumbai Indians (C)	14	10	4	0	20	0.784	Advanced to Qualifier 1
2	Rising Pune Supergiant (R)	14	9	5	0	18	0.176	Advanced to Qualifier 1
3	Sunrisers Hyderabad (4)	14	8	5	1	17	0.599	Advanced to the Eliminator
4	Kolkata Knight Riders (3)	14	8	6	0	16	0.641	Advanced to the Eliminator
5	Kings XI Punjab	14	7	7	0	14	−0.009	
6	Delhi Daredevils	14	6	8	0	12	−0.512	
7	Gujarat Lions	14	4	10	0	8	−0.412	
8	Royal Challengers Bangalore	14	3	10	1	7	−1.299	

Source: ESPNcricinfo
The four top ranked teams qualified for the playoffs

== Matches ==
8 April	(H) Royal Challengers Bangalore; 157/8 (20 overs)	v	Delhi Daredevils; 142/9 (20 overs)	Royal Challengers Bangalore won by 15 runs
(D/N); Scorecard	(H) Royal Challengers Bangalore; 157/8 (20 overs)	v	Delhi Daredevils; 142/9 (20 overs)	M. Chinnaswamy Stadium, Bangalore; Umpires: Sundaram Ravi (India) and Virender Sharma (India); Player of the match: Kedar Jadhav (Royal Challengers Bangalore)
(D/N); Scorecard	Kedar Jadhav 69 (37); Chris Morris 3/21 (4 overs)		Rishabh Pant 57 (36); Pawan Negi 2/3 (1 over)	M. Chinnaswamy Stadium, Bangalore; Umpires: Sundaram Ravi (India) and Virender Sharma (India); Player of the match: Kedar Jadhav (Royal Challengers Bangalore)
Royal Challengers Bangalore won the toss and elected to bat.				M. Chinnaswamy Stadium, Bangalore; Umpires: Sundaram Ravi (India) and Virender Sharma (India); Player of the match: Kedar Jadhav (Royal Challengers Bangalore)

11 April	Delhi Daredevils; 205/4 (20 overs)	v	Rising Pune Supergiant (H); 108 (16.1 overs)	Delhi Daredevils won by 97 runs
(D/N); Scorecard	Delhi Daredevils; 205/4 (20 overs)	v	Rising Pune Supergiant (H); 108 (16.1 overs)	Maharashtra Cricket Association Stadium, Pune; Umpires: Anil Dandekar (India) and Sundaram Ravi (India); Player of the match: Sanju Samson (Delhi Daredevils)
(D/N); Scorecard	Sanju Samson 102 (63); Imran Tahir 1/24 (4 overs)		Mayank Agarwal 20 (18); Amit Mishra 3/11 (3 overs)	Maharashtra Cricket Association Stadium, Pune; Umpires: Anil Dandekar (India) and Sundaram Ravi (India); Player of the match: Sanju Samson (Delhi Daredevils)
Rising Pune Supergiant won the toss and elected to field.; Sanju Samson (Delhi Daredevils) scored his first century in a T20.				Maharashtra Cricket Association Stadium, Pune; Umpires: Anil Dandekar (India) and Sundaram Ravi (India); Player of the match: Sanju Samson (Delhi Daredevils)

15 April	(H) Delhi Daredevils; 188/6 (20 overs)	v	Kings XI Punjab; 137/9 (20 overs)	Delhi Daredevils won by 51 runs
20:00 (D/N); Scorecard	(H) Delhi Daredevils; 188/6 (20 overs)	v	Kings XI Punjab; 137/9 (20 overs)	Feroz Shah Kotla, Delhi; Umpires: Yeshwant Barde (India) and Nitin Menon (India); Player of the match: Corey Anderson (Delhi Daredevils)
20:00 (D/N); Scorecard	Sam Billings 55 (40); Varun Aaron 2/45 (4 overs)		Axar Patel 44 (29); Chris Morris 3/23 (4 overs)	Feroz Shah Kotla, Delhi; Umpires: Yeshwant Barde (India) and Nitin Menon (India); Player of the match: Corey Anderson (Delhi Daredevils)
Delhi Daredevils won the toss and elected to bat.				Feroz Shah Kotla, Delhi; Umpires: Yeshwant Barde (India) and Nitin Menon (India); Player of the match: Corey Anderson (Delhi Daredevils)

17 April	(H) Delhi Daredevils; 168/7 (20 overs)	v	Kolkata Knight Riders; 169/6 (19.5 overs)	Kolkata Knight Riders won by 4 wickets
16:00 (D/N); Scorecard	(H) Delhi Daredevils; 168/7 (20 overs)	v	Kolkata Knight Riders; 169/6 (19.5 overs)	Feroz Shah Kotla, Delhi; Umpires: Nitin Menon (India) and C. K. Nandan (India); Player of the match: Manish Pandey (Kolkata Knight Riders)
16:00 (D/N); Scorecard	Sanju Samson 39 (25); Nathan Coulter-Nile 3/22 (4 overs)		Manish Pandey 69* (49); Zaheer Khan 2/28 (4 overs)	Feroz Shah Kotla, Delhi; Umpires: Nitin Menon (India) and C. K. Nandan (India); Player of the match: Manish Pandey (Kolkata Knight Riders)
Delhi Daredevils won the toss and elected to bat.				Feroz Shah Kotla, Delhi; Umpires: Nitin Menon (India) and C. K. Nandan (India); Player of the match: Manish Pandey (Kolkata Knight Riders)

19 April	(H) Sunrisers Hyderabad; 191/4 (20 overs)	v	Delhi Daredevils; 176/5 (20 overs)	Sunrisers Hyderabad won by 15 runs
20:00 (D/N); Scorecard	(H) Sunrisers Hyderabad; 191/4 (20 overs)	v	Delhi Daredevils; 176/5 (20 overs)	Rajiv Gandhi International Cricket Stadium, Hyderabad; Umpires: Chris Gaffaney (New Zealand) and Nigel Llong (England); Player of the match: Kane Williamson (Sunrisers Hyderabad)
20:00 (D/N); Scorecard	Kane Williamson 89 (51); Chris Morris 4/26 (4 overs)		Shreyas Iyer 50* (31); Mohammed Siraj 2/39 (4 overs)	Rajiv Gandhi International Cricket Stadium, Hyderabad; Umpires: Chris Gaffaney (New Zealand) and Nigel Llong (England); Player of the match: Kane Williamson (Sunrisers Hyderabad)
Sunrisers Hyderabad won the toss and elected to bat.				Rajiv Gandhi International Cricket Stadium, Hyderabad; Umpires: Chris Gaffaney (New Zealand) and Nigel Llong (England); Player of the match: Kane Williamson (Sunrisers Hyderabad)

22 April	(H) Mumbai Indians; 142/8 (20 overs)	v	Delhi Daredevils; 128/7 (20 overs)	Mumbai Indians won by 14 runs
20:00 (D/N); Scorecard	(H) Mumbai Indians; 142/8 (20 overs)	v	Delhi Daredevils; 128/7 (20 overs)	Wankhede Stadium, Mumbai; Umpires: Nand Kishore (India) and Sundaram Ravi (India); Player of the match: Mitchell McClenaghan (Mumbai Indians)
20:00 (D/N); Scorecard	Jos Buttler 28 (18); Amit Mishra 2/18 (4 overs)		Chris Morris 52* (41); Mitchell McClenaghan 3/24 (4 overs)	Wankhede Stadium, Mumbai; Umpires: Nand Kishore (India) and Sundaram Ravi (India); Player of the match: Mitchell McClenaghan (Mumbai Indians)
Delhi Daredevils won the toss and elected to field.				Wankhede Stadium, Mumbai; Umpires: Nand Kishore (India) and Sundaram Ravi (India); Player of the match: Mitchell McClenaghan (Mumbai Indians)

28 April	Delhi Daredevils; 160/6 (20 overs)	v	Kolkata Knight Riders (H); 161/3 (16.2 overs)	Kolkata Knight Riders won by 7 wickets
16:00 (D/N); Scorecard	Delhi Daredevils; 160/6 (20 overs)	v	Kolkata Knight Riders (H); 161/3 (16.2 overs)	Eden Gardens, Kolkata; Umpires: Nigel Llong (England) and Sundaram Ravi (India); Player of the match: Gautam Gambhir (Kolkata Knight Riders)
16:00 (D/N); Scorecard	Sanju Samson 60 (38); Nathan Coulter-Nile 3/34 (4 overs)		Gautam Gambhir 71* (52); Kagiso Rabada 2/20 (3.2 overs)	Eden Gardens, Kolkata; Umpires: Nigel Llong (England) and Sundaram Ravi (India); Player of the match: Gautam Gambhir (Kolkata Knight Riders)
Kolkata Knight Riders won the toss and elected to field.				Eden Gardens, Kolkata; Umpires: Nigel Llong (England) and Sundaram Ravi (India); Player of the match: Gautam Gambhir (Kolkata Knight Riders)

30 April	Delhi Daredevils; 67 (17.1 overs)	v	Kings XI Punjab (H); 68/0 (7.5 overs)	Kings XI Punjab won by 10 wickets
16:00 (D/N); Scorecard	Delhi Daredevils; 67 (17.1 overs)	v	Kings XI Punjab (H); 68/0 (7.5 overs)	Punjab Cricket Association IS Bindra Stadium, Mohali; Umpires: Yeshwant Barde (India) and C. K. Nandan (India); Player of the match: Sandeep Sharma (Kings XI Punjab)
16:00 (D/N); Scorecard	Corey Anderson 18 (25); Sandeep Sharma 4/20 (4 overs)		Martin Guptill 50* (27); Amit Mishra 0/9 (1 over)	Punjab Cricket Association IS Bindra Stadium, Mohali; Umpires: Yeshwant Barde (India) and C. K. Nandan (India); Player of the match: Sandeep Sharma (Kings XI Punjab)
Kings XI Punjab won the toss and elected to field.				Punjab Cricket Association IS Bindra Stadium, Mohali; Umpires: Yeshwant Barde (India) and C. K. Nandan (India); Player of the match: Sandeep Sharma (Kings XI Punjab)

2 May	Sunrisers Hyderabad; 185/3 (20 overs)	v	Delhi Daredevils (H); 189/4 (19.1 overs)	Delhi Daredevils won by 6 wickets
20:00 (D/N); Scorecard	Sunrisers Hyderabad; 185/3 (20 overs)	v	Delhi Daredevils (H); 189/4 (19.1 overs)	Feroz Shah Kotla, Delhi; Umpires: Yeshwant Barde (India) and Nitin Menon (India); Player of the match: Mohammed Shami (Delhi Daredevils)
20:00 (D/N); Scorecard	Yuvraj Singh 70* (41); Mohammed Shami 2/36 (4 overs)		Corey Anderson 41* (24); Mohammed Siraj 2/41 (4 overs)	Feroz Shah Kotla, Delhi; Umpires: Yeshwant Barde (India) and Nitin Menon (India); Player of the match: Mohammed Shami (Delhi Daredevils)
Delhi Daredevils won the toss and elected to field.				Feroz Shah Kotla, Delhi; Umpires: Yeshwant Barde (India) and Nitin Menon (India); Player of the match: Mohammed Shami (Delhi Daredevils)

4 May	Gujarat Lions; 208/7 (20 overs)	v	Delhi Daredevils (H); 214/3 (17.3 overs)	Delhi Daredevils won by 7 wickets
20:00 (D/N); Scorecard	Gujarat Lions; 208/7 (20 overs)	v	Delhi Daredevils (H); 214/3 (17.3 overs)	Feroz Shah Kotla, Delhi; Umpires: Marais Erasmus (South Africa) and Nitin Menon (India); Player of the match: Rishabh Pant (Delhi Daredevils)
20:00 (D/N); Scorecard	Suresh Raina 77 (43); Kagiso Rabada 2/28 (4 overs)		Rishabh Pant 97 (43); Ravindra Jadeja 1/28 (2 overs)	Feroz Shah Kotla, Delhi; Umpires: Marais Erasmus (South Africa) and Nitin Menon (India); Player of the match: Rishabh Pant (Delhi Daredevils)
Delhi Daredevils won the toss and elected to field.				Feroz Shah Kotla, Delhi; Umpires: Marais Erasmus (South Africa) and Nitin Menon (India); Player of the match: Rishabh Pant (Delhi Daredevils)

6 May	Mumbai Indians; 212/3 (20 overs)	v	Delhi Daredevils (H); 66 (13.4 overs)	Mumbai Indians won by 146 runs
20:00 (D/N); Scorecard	Mumbai Indians; 212/3 (20 overs)	v	Delhi Daredevils (H); 66 (13.4 overs)	Feroz Shah Kotla, Delhi; Umpires: Nitin Menon (India) and C. K. Nandan (India); Player of the match: Lendl Simmons (Mumbai Indians)
20:00 (D/N); Scorecard	Lendl Simmons 66 (43); Corey Anderson 1/29 (2 overs)		Karun Nair 21 (15); Karn Sharma 3/11 (3.4 overs)	Feroz Shah Kotla, Delhi; Umpires: Nitin Menon (India) and C. K. Nandan (India); Player of the match: Lendl Simmons (Mumbai Indians)
Delhi Daredevils won the toss and elected to field.; This was the largest winning margin in an IPL match.				Feroz Shah Kotla, Delhi; Umpires: Nitin Menon (India) and C. K. Nandan (India); Player of the match: Lendl Simmons (Mumbai Indians)

10 May	(H) Gujarat Lions; 195/5 (20 overs)	v	Delhi Daredevils; 197/8 (19.4 overs)	Delhi Daredevils won by 2 wickets
20:00 (D/N); Scorecard	(H) Gujarat Lions; 195/5 (20 overs)	v	Delhi Daredevils; 197/8 (19.4 overs)	Green Park Stadium, Kanpur; Umpires: Yeshwant Barde (India) and Anil Chaudhary (India); Player of the match: Shreyas Iyer (Delhi Daredevils)
20:00 (D/N); Scorecard	Aaron Finch 69 (39); Amit Mishra 1/27 (2 overs)		Shreyas Iyer 96 (57); James Faulkner 2/39 (4 overs)	Green Park Stadium, Kanpur; Umpires: Yeshwant Barde (India) and Anil Chaudhary (India); Player of the match: Shreyas Iyer (Delhi Daredevils)
Delhi Daredevils won the toss and elected to field.				Green Park Stadium, Kanpur; Umpires: Yeshwant Barde (India) and Anil Chaudhary (India); Player of the match: Shreyas Iyer (Delhi Daredevils)

12 May	(H) Delhi Daredevils; 168/8 (20 overs)	v	Rising Pune Supergiant; 161/7 (20 overs)	Delhi Daredevils won by 7 runs
20:00 (D/N); Scorecard	(H) Delhi Daredevils; 168/8 (20 overs)	v	Rising Pune Supergiant; 161/7 (20 overs)	Feroz Shah Kotla, Delhi; Umpires: K. N. Ananthapadmanabhan (India) and C. K. Nandan (India); Player of the match: Karun Nair (Delhi Daredevils)
20:00 (D/N); Scorecard	Karun Nair 64 (45); Jaydev Unadkat 2/29 (4 overs)		Manoj Tiwary 60 (45); Zaheer Khan 2/25 (4 overs)	Feroz Shah Kotla, Delhi; Umpires: K. N. Ananthapadmanabhan (India) and C. K. Nandan (India); Player of the match: Karun Nair (Delhi Daredevils)
Delhi Daredevils won the toss and elected to bat.				Feroz Shah Kotla, Delhi; Umpires: K. N. Ananthapadmanabhan (India) and C. K. Nandan (India); Player of the match: Karun Nair (Delhi Daredevils)

14 May	Royal Challengers Bangalore; 161/6 (20 overs)	v	Delhi Daredevils (H); 151 (20 overs)	Royal Challengers Bangalore won by 10 runs
20:00 (D/N); Scorecard	Royal Challengers Bangalore; 161/6 (20 overs)	v	Delhi Daredevils (H); 151 (20 overs)	Feroz Shah Kotla, Delhi; Umpires: C. K. Nandan (India) and Chettithody Shamshuddin (India); Player of the match: Harshal Patel (Royal Challengers Bangalore)
20:00 (D/N); Scorecard	Virat Kohli 58 (45); Pat Cummins 2/21 (4 overs)		Rishabh Pant 45 (34); Pawan Negi 3/10 (2 overs)	Feroz Shah Kotla, Delhi; Umpires: C. K. Nandan (India) and Chettithody Shamshuddin (India); Player of the match: Harshal Patel (Royal Challengers Bangalore)
Royal Challengers Bangalore won the toss and elected to bat.; Avesh Khan (Royal Challengers Bangalore) made his T20 debut.				Feroz Shah Kotla, Delhi; Umpires: C. K. Nandan (India) and Chettithody Shamshuddin (India); Player of the match: Harshal Patel (Royal Challengers Bangalore)

== Statistics ==
Most runs
Player	Runs
Sanju Samson	386
Rishabh Pant	366
Shreyas Iyer	338

Most wickets
Player	Wickets
Pat Cummins	15
Chris Morris	12
Zaheer Khan	10
