= 2017 Kings XI Punjab season =

Indian Premier League cricket team season

Kings XI Punjab
2017 season
- Coach: Virender Sehwag
- Captain: Glenn Maxwell
- Ground(s): PCA Stadium, Mohali
- IPL: 5th

Kings XI Punjab, now known as Punjab Kings, are a franchise cricket team based in Mohali, India, which plays in the Indian Premier League (IPL). They were one of the eight teams which competed in the 2017 Indian Premier League. The Kings XI Punjab drew an average home attendance of 20,001 in the 2017 IPL season.

== Season standings ==
Pos	Team	Pld	W	L	NR	Pts	NRR	
1	Mumbai Indians (C)	14	10	4	0	20	0.784	Advanced to Qualifier 1
2	Rising Pune Supergiant (R)	14	9	5	0	18	0.176	Advanced to Qualifier 1
3	Sunrisers Hyderabad (4)	14	8	5	1	17	0.599	Advanced to the Eliminator
4	Kolkata Knight Riders (3)	14	8	6	0	16	0.641	Advanced to the Eliminator
5	Kings XI Punjab	14	7	7	0	14	−0.009	
6	Delhi Daredevils	14	6	8	0	12	−0.512	
7	Gujarat Lions	14	4	10	0	8	−0.412	
8	Royal Challengers Bangalore	14	3	10	1	7	−1.299	

Source: ESPNcricinfo
The four top ranked teams qualified for the playoffs

== Auction ==
The player auction for the 2017 Indian Premier League was held on 20 February in Bangalore.

== Squad ==
- Players with international caps are listed in **bold**.

No.	Name	Nationality	Birth date	Batting style	Bowling style	Year signed	Salary	Notes
Batsmen
1	**Hashim Amla**	South Africa	31 March 1983 (aged 34)	Right-handed	Right-arm medium	2016	₹1 crore (US$150,000)	Overseas
8	**Murali Vijay**	India	1 April 1984 (aged 33)	Right-handed	Right-arm off break	2015	₹3 crore (US$460,000)	
10	**David Miller**	South Africa	10 June 1989 (aged 27)	Left-handed	Right-arm off break	2014 (since 2011)	₹5 crore (US$770,000)	Overseas
16	**Eoin Morgan**	England	10 September 1986 (aged 30)	Left-handed	Right-arm medium	2017	₹2 crore (US$310,000)	Overseas
22	**Gurkeerat Singh**	India	29 June 1990 (aged 26)	Right-handed	Right-arm off break	2014 (since 2012)	₹1.3 crore (US$200,000)	Occasional wicket-keeper
31	**Martin Guptill**	New Zealand	30 September 1986 (aged 30)	Right-handed	Right-arm off break	2017	₹50 lakh (US$77,000)	Overseas
36	Manan Vohra	India	18 July 1993 (aged 23)	Right-handed	Right-arm medium	2014 (since 2013)	₹35 lakh (US$54,000)	
42	**Shaun Marsh**	Australia	9 July 1983 (aged 33)	Left-handed	Slow left-arm orthodox	2014 (since 2008)	₹2.2 crore (US$340,000)	Overseas
	Nikhil Naik	India	9 November 1994 (aged 22)	Right-handed	Right-arm off break	2015	₹30 lakh (US$46,000)	Occasional wicket-keeper
	Armaan Jaffer	India	25 October 1998 (aged 18)	Right-handed	Right-arm off break	2016	₹10 lakh (US$15,000)	
	Rinku Singh	India	12 October 1997 (aged 19)	Left-handed	Right-arm off break	2017	₹10 lakh (US$15,000)	
All-rounders
14	Rahul Tewatia	India	20 May 1993 (aged 23)	Left-handed	Right-arm leg break	2017	₹25 lakh (US$38,000)	
17	**Marcus Stoinis**	Australia	18 September 1988 (aged 28)	Right-handed	Right-arm medium-fast	2016	₹55 lakh (US$84,000)	Overseas
20	**Axar Patel**	India	20 January 1994 (aged 23)	Left-handed	Slow left-arm orthodox	2014	₹75 lakh (US$115,000)	
32	**Glenn Maxwell**	Australia	14 October 1988 (aged 28)	Right-handed	Right-arm off break	2014	₹6 crore (US$920,000)	Overseas, Captain
88	**Darren Sammy**	Saint Lucia	20 December 1983 (aged 33)	Right-handed	Right-arm medium-fast	2017	₹30 lakh (US$46,000)	Overseas
Wicket-keepers
6	**Wriddhiman Saha**	India	24 October 1984 (aged 32)	Right-handed		2014	₹2.2 crore (US$340,000)	Vice Captain
Bowlers
4	Anureet Singh	India	2 March 1988 (aged 29)	Right-handed	Right-arm medium-fast	2014	₹20 lakh (US$31,000)	
5	Swapnil Singh	India	22 January 1991 (aged 26)	Right-handed	Slow left-arm orthodox	2016	₹10 lakh (US$15,000)	
18	**Mohit Sharma**	India	18 September 1988 (aged 28)	Right-handed	Right-arm medium-fast	2016	₹6.5 crore (US$998,000)	
21	**Matt Henry**	New Zealand	14 December 1991 (aged 25)	Right-handed	Right-arm fast-medium	2017	₹50 lakh (US$77,000)	Overseas
26	KC Cariappa	India	13 April 1994 (aged 22)	Right-handed	Right-arm leg break	2016	₹80 lakh (US$120,000)	
29	**Ishant Sharma**	India	2 September 1988 (aged 28)	Right-handed	Right-arm fast-medium	2017	Replacement signing	
44	T Natarajan	India	27 May 1991 (aged 25)	Left-handed	Left-arm fast-medium	2017	₹3 crore (US$460,000)	
66	**Sandeep Sharma**	India	18 May 1993 (aged 23)	Right-handed	Right-arm medium-fast	2014 (since 2013)	₹85 lakh (US$130,000)	
77	**Varun Aaron**	India	29 October 1989 (aged 27)	Right-handed	Right-arm fast	2017	₹2.8 crore (US$430,000)	
	Pardeep Sahu	India	21 August 1985 (aged 31)	Right-handed	Right-arm leg break googly	2016	₹10 lakh (US$15,000)	

== Support staff changes ==
- In December 2016, Sanjay Bangar stepped down as the team's head coach.
- In January 2017, Virender Sehwag was named head of cricket operations and strategy.
- In February 2017, J. Arunkumar was named batting coach.
