= 2019 Cricket World Cup officials =

Match officials for the 2019 Cricket World Cup were selected by the ICC's umpire selection panel. The panel selected 16 umpires to officiate at the tournament, four from Australia, five from England, four from Asia, and one from each of New Zealand, South Africa and West Indies. It also selected six match referees for the event.

== Umpires ==
Out of the selected umpires, twelve were part of the Elite Panel of ICC Umpires with the remaining four on the International Panel. Ian Gould, an Elite panel umpire, announced that he would retire as an umpire following the conclusion of the tournament. On 6 July 2019, Gould retired from umpiring, after standing in the World Cup match between India and Sri Lanka.

Name	Country	Panel	Matches	WC Matches (before 2019)	2019 WC
Aleem Dar	Pakistan	Elite Panel	200	28	6
Kumar Dharmasena	Sri Lanka	Elite Panel	95	13	7
Marais Erasmus	South Africa	Elite Panel	82	12	7
Chris Gaffaney	New Zealand	Elite Panel	62	3	6
Ian Gould	England	Elite Panel	135	17	5
Richard Illingworth	England	Elite Panel	59	5	6
Richard Kettleborough	England	Elite Panel	82	13	6
Nigel Llong	England	Elite Panel	123	11	5
Bruce Oxenford	Australia	Elite Panel	90	11	4
Sundaram Ravi	India	Elite Panel	42	3	6
Paul Reiffel	Australia	Elite Panel	63	4	5
Rod Tucker	Australia	Elite Panel	78	13	5
Michael Gough	England	International Panel	54	3	5
Ruchira Palliyaguruge	Sri Lanka	International Panel	71	3	5
Joel Wilson	West Indies	International Panel	58	3	5
Paul Wilson	Australia	International Panel	23	0	5

- Source: CricInfo

== Referees ==
Six match referees were appointed by the selection panel, all part of the Elite Panel of ICC Referees.

Name	Country	Matches	WC Matches (before 2019)	2019 WC
David Boon	Australia	123	11	11
Chris Broad	England	309	31	5
Jeff Crowe	New Zealand	281	29	8
Ranjan Madugalle	Sri Lanka	347	56	12
Andy Pycroft	Zimbabwe	170	3	5
Richie Richardson	West Indies	48	0	6

- Source: CricInfo
