= Ankit Soni =

Indian cricketer (born 1993)

Personal information
- Born: 2 August 1993 (age 33); Sri Ganganagar
- Batting: Right-handed
- Bowling: Leg break googly
- Role: All-rounder

Domestic team information
- Years: Team
- 2017: Gujarat Lions
- Source: ESPNcricinfo

Ankit Soni is an Indian cricketer who played for the Gujarat Lions, a team that represented the Indian state of Gujarat in the Indian Premier League. He was signed up by the franchise in April 2017 as a replacement for the injured Shivil Kaushik. He made his Twenty20 debut for Gujarat Lions in the 2017 Indian Premier League on 27 April 2017.
