= Basil Thampi =

Indian cricketer

Personal information
- Born: 11 September 1993 (age 33); Ernakulam, Kerala, India
- Batting: Right-handed
- Bowling: Right-arm fast-medium
- Role: Bowler

Domestic team information
- Years: Team
- 2015–present: Kerala
- 2017: Gujarat Lions
- 2018–2020: Sunrisers Hyderabad
- 2022: Mumbai Indians

Career statistics
Competition	FC	LA	T20
Matches	58	44	88
Runs scored	622	131	73
Batting average	9.56	8.73	9.12
100s/50s	0/2	0/0	0/0
Top score	60	23	22
Balls bowled	7,074	1,916	1,818
Wickets	132	58	90
Bowling average	30.32	29.22	28.12
5 wickets in innings	3	1	0
10 wickets in match	0	0	0
Best bowling	5/27	6/51	4/15
Catches/stumpings	16/–	5/–	18/–
- Source: ESPNcricinfo, 27 March 2025

Basil Thampi (born 11 September 1993) is an Indian cricketer who represents Kerala in domestic cricket. He is a right-handed batsman and right-arm fast-medium pacer. He made his IPL debut for Gujarat Lions in the 2017 Indian Premier League and was named the "Emerging player of the season".

== Early and personal life ==
Basil was born on 11 September 1993 to N.M Thampi and Lisy Thampi. He married Sneha Roy on 4 July 2022.

== Domestic career ==
Thampi made his first-class debut for Kerala in the 2014–15 Ranji Trophy on 6 February 2015.

In June 2017, he earned his maiden call-up to India A team, as he was included in the 16-man one-day squad for the tri-series against hosts South Africa A and Australia A team. In October 2017, he was included in the Board President's XI and India A squads against New Zealand ahead of their One-Day International (ODI) series against India and five ODIs against New Zealand A.

In July 2018, he was named in the squad for India Blue for the 2018–19 Duleep Trophy, travelling through the flooding in Kerala to make the start of the season.

In August 2019, he was named in the India Blue team's squad for the 2019–20 Duleep Trophy.

He was the joint-highest wicket-taker of Kerala in the 2021-22 Syed Mushtaq Ali Trophy bagging eight wickets from 6 matches.

In August 2022, he was named in the South Zone's team for the 2022-23 Duleep Trophy.

== Indian Premier League ==
In February 2017, he was bought by the Gujarat Lions team for the 2017 Indian Premier League (IPL) for ₹85 lakhs. He received the "Emerging Player Award" inflicting 11 wickets from 12 matches in the season.

In January 2018, he was bought by the Sunrisers Hyderabad in the 2018 IPL auction. On 17 May 2018, while playing for Sunrisers Hyderabad, Thampi conceded 70 runs in four overs against Royal Challengers Bangalore making it the most expensive spell in the history of Indian Premier League until 2024 where Mohit Sharma surpassed him with a 73 run spell playing for Gujarat Titans against Delhi Capitals. In February 2022, he was bought by the Mumbai Indians in the auction for the 2022 Indian Premier League tournament.

== International career ==
Thampi was a net bowler for the Indian team during their four-match Test series against Australia in February–March 2017.

His only Indian national cricket team appearance was in November 2017. He was part of India's Twenty20 International (T20I) squad for their series against Sri Lanka, but he did not play. But he played for India A team in many matches.

== Playing style ==
Thampi bowls at a speed in excess of 140 km/h and is known for bowling yorkers consistently. Former India fast bowler and bowling coach of Kerala Tinu Yohannan described Thampi as "athletic" and "quite strong", and added, "He's very deceptive. He has a round-arm action where he can really get the ball to move. He can reverse the old ball." Thampi has stated that he "got [his] yorkers from tennis ball cricket."
