= 2017 Rising Pune Supergiant season =

Indian Premier League cricket team season

Rising Pune Supergiant
2017 Indian Premier League season
- Coach: Stephen Fleming
- Captain: Steve Smith
- Ground(s): Maharashtra Cricket Association Stadium, Pune (Capacity: 42,000)
- 2017 IPL: Runners-Up

Rising Pune Supergiant (RPS) was a franchise cricket team based in Pune, Maharashtra, India, which played in the Indian Premier League (IPL) in 2016 and 2017. It was one of eight teams which competed in the 2017 Indian Premier League. The team was captained for the season by Steve Smith and coached by Stephen Fleming. They lost the final to Mumbai Indians by 1 run in what was to be the team's last match.

== Pre-season ==
- Steve Smith replaced MS Dhoni as the team's captain before the start of the season.
- The franchise changed its name to Rising Pune Supergiant, removing the 's', on 26 March 2017.

== Player acquisition ==
The player auction for the 2017 season was held on 20 February in Bangalore. Rising Pune Supergiant bought the following players at the auction:

- Ben Stokes
- Jaydev Unadkat
- Rahul Chahar
- Saurabh Kumar
- Milind Tandon
- Daniel Christian
- Rahul Tripathi
- Manoj Tiwary
- Lockie Ferguson

The first trading window was open in December 2016 while the second trading window was open from 13 to 20 January 2017. The following transfers were made by Rising Pune Supergiant during the trading windows:

- Mayank Agarwal from Delhi Daredevils
- Shardul Thakur from Kings XI Punjab

== Squad ==
- Players with international caps are listed in **bold**

No.	Name	Nationality	Birth date	Batting style	Bowling style	Year signed	Salary	Notes
Batsmen
3	**Ajinkya Rahane**	India	5 June 1988 (aged 28)	Right-handed	Right-arm medium	2016	₹8 crore (US$1.23 million)	
13	**Faf du Plessis**	South Africa	13 July 1984 (aged 32)	Right-handed	Right-arm leg break	2016	₹4.75 crore (US$730,000)	Overseas
22	Mayank Agarwal	India	16 February 1991 (aged 26)	Right-handed	Right-arm off break	2017	₹1.6 crore (US$250,000)	
45	**Manoj Tiwary**	India	14 November 1985 (aged 31)	Right-handed	Right-arm leg break googly	2017	₹50 lakh (US$77,000)	
49	**Steve Smith**	Australia	2 June 1989 (aged 27)	Right-handed	Right-arm leg break	2016	₹4 crore (US$610,000)	Captain/Overseas
52	Rahul Tripathi	India	2 March 1991 (aged 26)	Right-handed	Right-arm medium	2017	₹10 lakh (US$15,000)	
100	**Usman Khawaja**	Australia	18 December 1986 (aged 30)	Left-handed	Right-arm medium	2016	₹1 crore (US$150,000)	Overseas
All-rounders
5	Baba Aparajith	India	8 July 1994 (aged 22)	Right-handed	Right-arm off break	2016	₹10 lakh (US$15,000)	
18	Ankit Sharma	India	20 April 1991 (aged 25)	Left-handed	Slow left-arm orthodox	2016	₹10 lakh (US$15,000)	
25	**Mitchell Marsh**	Australia	20 October 1991 (aged 25)	Right-handed	Right-arm medium-fast	2016	₹4.8 crore (US$740,000)	Overseas
29	Rajat Bhatia	India	22 October 1979 (aged 37)	Right-handed	Right-arm medium	2016	₹60 lakh (US$92,000)	
54	**Daniel Christian**	Australia	4 May 1983 (aged 33)	Right-handed	Right-arm medium-fast	2017	₹1 crore (US$150,000)	Overseas
55	**Ben Stokes**	England	4 June 1991 (aged 25)	Left-handed	Right-arm fast-medium	2017	₹14.5 crore (US$2.23 million)	Overseas
555	Washington Sundar	India	5 October 1999 (aged 17)	Left-handed	Right-arm off break	2017	Replacement signing	
Wicket-keepers
7	**MS Dhoni**	India	7 July 1981 (aged 35)	Right-handed	Right-arm medium	2016	₹12.5 crore (US$1.92 million)	
27	Ankush Bains	India	16 December 1995 (aged 21)	Right-handed		2016	₹10 lakh (US$15,000)	
	Milind Tandon	India	29 October 1993 (aged 23)	Right-handed		2017	₹10 lakh (US$15,000)	
Bowlers
1	Rahul Chahar	India	4 August 1999 (aged 17)	Right-handed	Right-arm leg break googly	2017	₹10 lakh (US$15,000)	
9	Deepak Chahar	India	7 August 1992 (aged 24)	Right-handed	Right-arm medium-fast	2016	₹10 lakh (US$15,000)	
10	Shardul Thakur	India	16 October 1991 (aged 25)	Right-handed	Right-arm medium-fast	2017	₹20 lakh (US$31,000)	
11	**Ashok Dinda**	India	25 March 1984 (aged 33)	Right-handed	Right-arm medium-fast	2016	₹50 lakh (US$77,000)	
63	**Adam Zampa**	Australia	31 March 1992 (aged 25)	Right-handed	Right-arm leg break googly	2016	₹30 lakh (US$46,000)	Overseas
69	**Lockie Ferguson**	New Zealand	13 June 1991 (aged 25)	Right-handed	Right-arm fast	2017	₹50 lakh (US$77,000)	Overseas
77	**Jaydev Unadkat**	India	18 October 1991 (aged 25)	Right-handed	Left-arm medium-fast	2017	₹30 lakh (US$46,000)	
99	**Ravichandran Ashwin**	India	17 September 1986 (aged 30)	Right-handed	Right-arm off break	2016	₹7.5 crore (US$1.15 million)	
999	**Imran Tahir**	South Africa	27 March 1979 (aged 38)	Right-handed	Right-arm leg break googly	2017	Replacement signing	Overseas
	Ishwar Pandey	India	15 August 1989 (aged 27)	Right-handed	Right-arm medium-fast	2016	₹20 lakh (US$31,000)	
	Jaskaran Singh	India	21 December 1991 (aged 25)	Left-handed	Left-arm medium-fast	2016	₹10 lakh (US$15,000)	
	Saurabh Kumar	India	1 May 1993 (aged 23)	Left-handed	Slow left-arm orthodox	2017	₹10 lakh (US$15,000)	

== League stage ==
No.	Date	Opponent	Venue	Result	Man of the Match	Scorecard
1	6 April 2017	Mumbai Indians	Pune	Won by 7 wickets	Steve Smith 84*(54)	Scorecard
2	8 April 2017	Kings XI Punjab	Indore	Lost by 6 wickets		Scorecard
3	11 April 2017	Delhi Daredevils	Pune	Lost by 97 runs		Scorecard
4	14 April 2017	Gujarat Lions	Rajkot	Lost by 7 wickets		Scorecard
5	16 April 2017	Royal Challengers Bangalore	Banaglore	Won by 27 runs	Ben Stokes 3/18 (4 overs)	Scorecard
6	22 April 2017	Sunrisers Hyderabad	Pune	Won by 6 wickets	MS Dhoni 61*(34)	Scorecard
7	24 April 2017	Mumbai Indians	Mumbai	Won by 3 runs	Ben Stokes 2/21 (4 overs)	Scorecard
8	26 April 2017	Kolkata Knight Riders	Pune	Lost by 7 wickets		Scorecard
9	29 April 2017	Royal Challengers Bangalore	Pune	Won by 61 runs	Lockie Ferguson 2/7 (4 overs)	Scorecard
10	1 May 2017	Gujarat Lions	Pune	Won by 5 wickets	Ben Stokes 103*(63)	Scorecard
11	3 May 2017	Kolkata Knight Riders	Kolkata	Won by 4 wickets	Rahul Tripathi 93(52)	Scorecard
12	6 May 2017	Sunrisers Hyderabad	Hyderabad	Won by 12 runs	Jaydev Unadkat 5/30 (4 overs)	Scorecard
13	12 May 2017	Delhi Daredevils	Delhi	Lost by 7 runs		Scorecard
14	14 May 2017	Kings XI Punjab	Pune	Won by 9 wickets	Jaydev Unadkat 2/12 (3 overs)	Scorecard
League stage record of 9–5; second in points table; qualified for playoffs

== Play-offs ==
Qualifier 1

16 May
20:00 (D/N)
Scorecard

Rising Pune Supergiant; 162/4 (20 overs)	v	Mumbai Indians (H); 142/9 (20 overs)
Manoj Tiwary 58 (48); Lasith Malinga 1/14 (3 overs)		Parthiv Patel 52 (40); Washington Sundar 3/16 (4 overs)

Rising Pune Supergiant won by 20 runs
Wankhede Stadium, Mumbai
Umpires: Sundaram Ravi (India) and Chettithody Shamshuddin (India)
Player of the match: Washington Sundar (Rising Pune Supergiant)

- Mumbai Indians won the toss and elected to field.
- 3/16 (4 overs) were the best figures of Washington Sundar (Rising Pune Supergiant).
- This victory meant RPS directly qualified for the final.

Final

21 May
20:00 (D/N)
Scorecard

Rising Pune Supergiant; 128/6 (20 overs)	v	Mumbai Indians; 129/8 (20 overs)
Steve Smith 51 (50); Mitchell Johnson 3/26 (4 overs)		Krunal Pandya 47 (38); Jaydev Unadkat 2/19 (4 overs)

Mumbai Indians won by 1 run
Rajiv Gandhi International Cricket Stadium, Hyderabad
Umpires: Nigel Llong (England) and Sundaram Ravi (India)
Player of the match: Krunal Pandya (Mumbai Indians)

- Mumbai Indians won the toss and elected to bat.
- Mumbai Indians became the first team to win a third IPL title.
- This was Rising Pune Supergiant's last IPL game and was the first IPL final to be decided by 1 run.

== Statistics ==
=== Most runs ===
Player	Mat	Inns	NO	Runs	Ave	SR	HS	100	50	4s	6s
Steve Smith	15	15	3	472	39.33	121.96	84*	0	3	38	12
Rahul Tripathi	14	14	0	391	27.92	146.44	93	0	2	43	17
Ajinkya Rahane	16	16	1	382	25.46	118.26	60	0	2	35	9
Manoj Tiwary	15	13	3	324	32.40	137.28	60	0	2	31	11
Ben Stokes	12	11	1	316	31.60	142.98	103*	1	1	22	15

- Source: ESPNcricinfo

=== Most wickets ===
Player	Mat	Inns	Wkts	BBI	Avg	Econ	SR	4w	5w
Jaydev Unadkat	12	12	24	5/30	13.41	7.02	11.4	0	1
Imran Tahir	12	12	18	3/18	20.50	7.85	15.6	0	0
Ben Stokes	12	12	12	3/18	26.33	7.18	22.0	0	0
Daniel Christian	13	13	11	2/10	27.09	7.45	21.8	0	0
Shardul Thakur	12	12	11	3/19	28.63	8.25	20.8	0	0

- Source: ESPNcricinfo
