= Pawan Negi =

Indian cricketer

Personal information
- Full name: Pawan Negi
- Born: 6 January 1993 (age 33); Delhi, India
- Batting: Left-handed
- Bowling: Slow left-arm orthodox
- Role: Bowler

International information
- National side: India
- Only T20I (cap 59): 3 March 2016 v UAE

Domestic team information
- Years: Team
- 2011–2021: Delhi (squad no. 15)
- 2012–2013: Delhi Daredevils
- 2014–2015: Chennai Super Kings (squad no. 6)
- 2016: Delhi Daredevils (squad no. 6)
- 2017–2019: Royal Challengers Bangalore (squad no. 6)

Career statistics
Competition	T20I	FC	LA	T20
Matches	1	3	49	119
Runs scored	–	58	607	803
Batting average	–	19.33	27.59	15.74
100s/50s	–	0/0	1/1	0/0
Top score	–	30*	124*	41*
Balls bowled	18	156	2,022	1,905
Wickets	1	4	61	96
Bowling average	16.00	24.00	27.44	24.61
5 wickets in innings	0	0	0	1
10 wickets in match	0	0	0	0
Best bowling	1/16	2/12	4/32	5/22
Catches/stumpings	2/–	1/–	16/–	40/–
Medal record
Men's Cricket
Representing India
ACC Asia Cup
Winner	2016 Bangladesh
- Source: ESPNcricinfo, 12 October 2021

Pawan Negi (born 6 January 1993) is an Indian cricketer. He is a slow left-arm orthodox bowler. He was born in Uttarakhand. He was a part of the Indian squad which won the 2016 Asia Cup.

== Career ==
Negi played for Delhi in domestic cricket. He played for Delhi Daredevils in the Indian Premier League in 2012 and 2013 and for Chennai Super Kings in 2014 and 2015 before rejoining Delhi for the 2016 season.

Negi made his Twenty20 International debut for India national cricket team against the United Arab Emirates in the 2016 Asia Cup at Sher-e-Bangla National Stadium on 3 March 2016. He was picked in the Indian squad for ICC T20 World Cup 2016. To date this is his only international cap.

In February 2017, he was bought by Royal Challengers Bangalore ahead of the 2017 Indian Premier League and played for the side between 2017 and 2019. In February 2021, he was bought by Kolkata Knight Riders ahead of the 2021 Indian Premier League but did not play a match in the competition. KKR bought him at his base price of 50 lakhs for IPL 2021.
