= Sundaram Ravi =

Indian cricket umpire

Personal information
- Full name: Sundaram Ravi
- Born: 22 April 1966 (age 60); Bangalore, Mysore State, India
- Role: Umpire

Umpiring information
- Tests umpired: 33 (2013–2019)
- ODIs umpired: 48 (2011–2019)
- T20Is umpired: 26 (2011–2019)
- WODIs umpired: 7 (2007–2013)
- WT20Is umpired: 11 (2010–2023)
- FC umpired: 58 (1992–2020)
- LA umpired: 54 (1993–2022)
- T20 umpired: 195 (2007–2022)
- Source: ESPNcricinfo, 31 March 2023

Sundaram Ravi (born 22 April 1966) is an Indian cricket umpire who was a member of the ICC Elite Panel of Umpires between 2015 and 2019. After making his Twenty20 International (T20I) umpiring debut in 2011, he officiated in over 100 international matches at Test, One Day International (ODI) and T20I level.

He was elevated to the Elite Panel of ICC Umpires in 2015 and became only the second Indian umpire after Srinivasaraghavan Venkataraghavan to be a member of the Elite panel. He was selected as one of the twenty umpires to stand in matches during the 2015 Cricket World Cup.

In April 2019, he was named as one of the sixteen umpires to stand in matches during the 2019 Cricket World Cup. In July 2019, Ravi was removed from Elite Panel of Umpires. He was one of the twelve umpires to officiate matches in the 2019 ICC T20 World Cup Qualifier tournament in the United Arab Emirates.

== See also ==
- List of Test cricket umpires
- List of One Day International cricket umpires
- List of Twenty20 International cricket umpires
