= Nigel Llong =

Cricket umpire

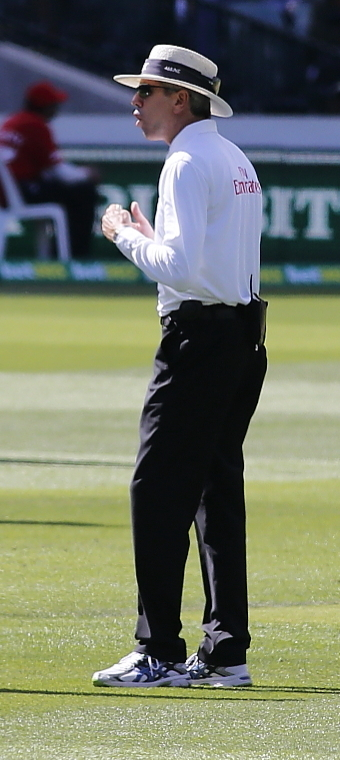
- Llong in 2016

Personal information
- Full name: Nigel James Llong
- Born: 11 February 1969 (age 57); Ashford, Kent, England
- Batting: Left-handed
- Bowling: Right-arm off-break
- Role: All-rounder, Umpire

Domestic team information
- Years: Team
- 1989–1999: Kent
- 2000: Norfolk
- FC debut: 20 June 1990 Kent v Cambridge University
- Last FC: 3 August 1998 Kent v Derbyshire
- LA debut: 23 July 1989 Kent v Middlesex
- Last LA: 16 May 2000 Norfolk v Dorset

Umpiring information
- Tests umpired: 62 (2008–2020)
- ODIs umpired: 130 (2006–2020)
- T20Is umpired: 32 (2005–2016)
- WODIs umpired: 6 (2001–2022)
- WT20Is umpired: 20 (2009–2021)

Career statistics
Competition	First-class	List A
Matches	68	136
Runs scored	3,024	2,302
Batting average	31.17	25.29
100s/50s	6/16	2/8
Top score	130	123
Balls bowled	2,273	1,317
Wickets	35	40
Bowling average	35.97	30.25
5 wickets in innings	2	0
10 wickets in match	0	0
Best bowling	5/21	4/24
Catches/stumpings	59/–	41/–
- Source: ESPNcricinfo, 29 February 2020

Nigel James Llong (born 11 February 1969) is an English cricket umpire and former first-class cricketer. Until June 2020, he was a member of the Elite Panel of ICC Umpires and officiated in international matches - Tests, ODIs and T20Is. Earlier, he had played English domestic cricket during the 1990s with Kent County Cricket Club.

== Playing career ==
Llong made his first-class cricket debut for Kent in 1990 and won his county cap in 1993. His playing style was unusual in that he batted left-handed but bowled right-handed off spin. He also played club cricket at Green Point CC in Cape Town during the early 1990s.Nigel Also played for Ashburton Cricket Club in Australia for 3 seasons in the 1990s as Captain Coach

== Umpiring career ==
Llong officiated in his maiden first-class match in June 2000. He was appointed to the ECB's panel of first-class umpires in 2002. In 2004, he became a member of the ICC International umpire panel as a specialist third umpire, and in 2006 he became a full member of the International Panel. As with all members of the ICC International umpire panel, Llong is eligible to serve as the home umpire in ODIs in England, and can also be appointed by the ICC to stand in ODIs and Test matches away from England as a neutral official.

The highlights of Llong's career so far include his appointment to the final of the 2004 Twenty20 Cup. His first ODI, which took place at Lord's, was between England and Sri Lanka in June 2006. His first overseas appointment was the ODI between Pakistan and West Indies at Lahore in December 2006. Llong umpired his first Test match in January 2008, between New Zealand and Bangladesh at Dunedin.

Llong was selected to be a reserve umpire for the 2007 Cricket World Cup, but was not called upon to officiate at any point in the tournament. He was appointed to stand in the 2007 Twenty20 World Championship in South Africa in September 2007. He was one of the twenty umpires to stand in matches during the 2015 Cricket World Cup.

In April 2019, he was named as one of the sixteen umpires to stand in matches during the 2019 Cricket World Cup.

== See also ==
- List of Test cricket umpires
- List of One Day International cricket umpires
- List of Twenty20 International cricket umpires
