= Bazball =

Style of cricketing play

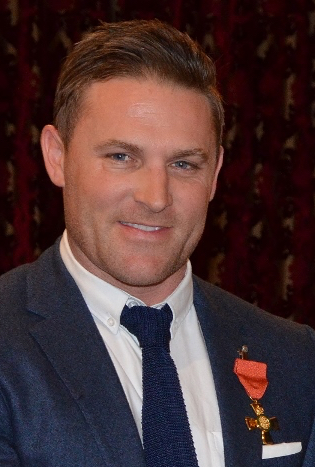
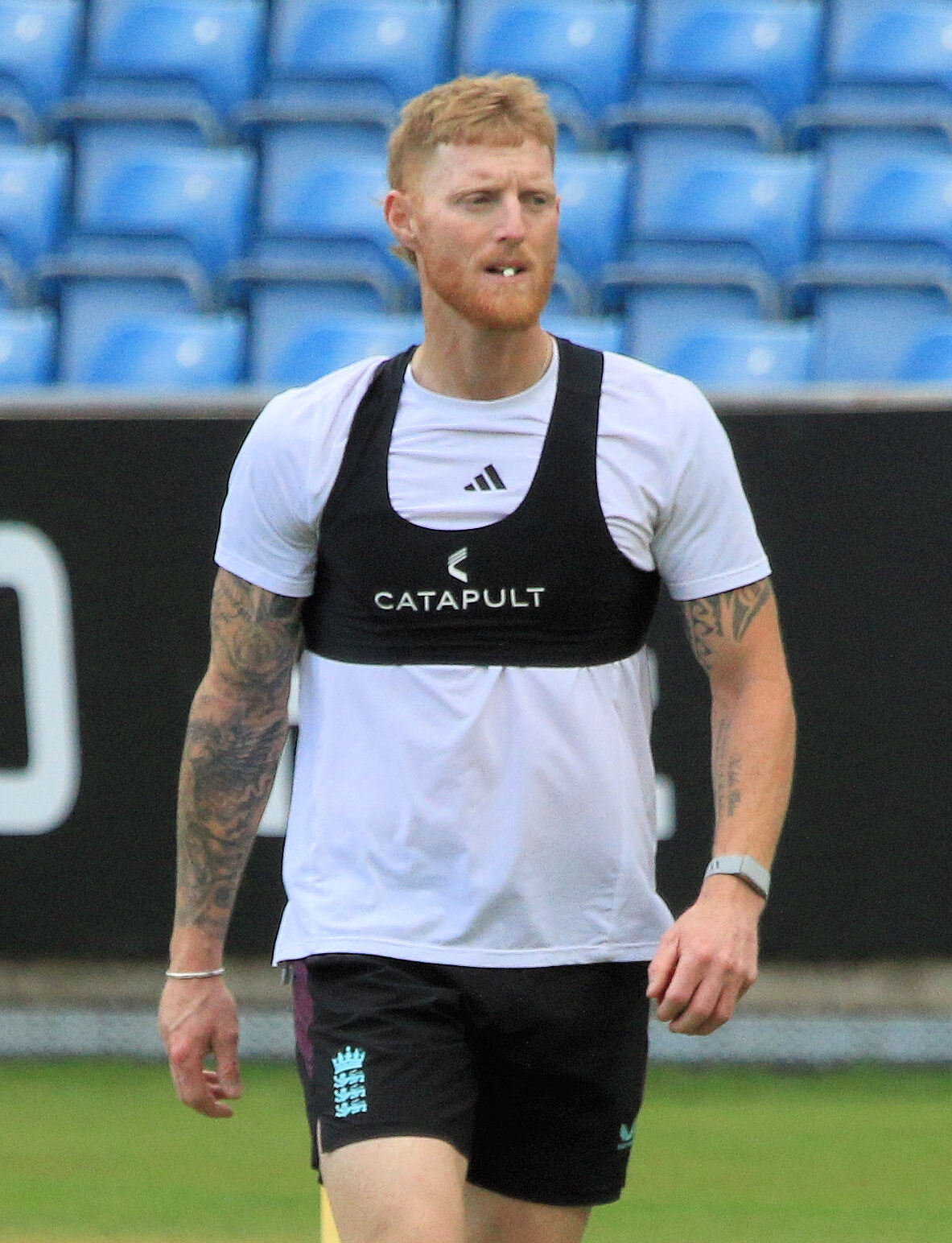
Brendon McCullum and Ben Stokes, the key figures behind Bazball

Bazball is an informal term for the style of play developed by the England cricket team in Test matches following the appointments of Brendon "Baz" McCullum as Test head coach and Ben Stokes as Test captain by English cricket managing director Rob Key in May 2022. The word was coined by ESPN Cricinfo UK editor Andrew Miller during the 2022 English cricket season.

The Bazball style and mindset is said to have an emphasis on taking decisions in attack and defence, whether batting or in the field, that create "positive" cricket to push game towards decisive results in an attempt by England to win more games. These tactical choices have included riskier shot selection as individual players, aggressive batting in match positions where defensive play would be the normal style, declarations in situations where most teams would have continued to bat and avoiding overly defensive bowling choices. The core element of this style was a significant increase in their scoring run rate, which included breaking the record for the highest run rate in a completed Test innings by scoring at 6.5 runs per over for 101 overs against Pakistan in 2022, finishing their first innings on 657 runs. This broke a record that had stood since 1902, with England scoring at a high run rate in many subsequent innings. Many of these skills and strategies were developed in playing One Day International and Twenty20 matches.

The style has had mixed results. Successes against New Zealand, South Africa, Sri Lanka and the West Indies were offset by an away series loss and home series draw against India, an away series loss to Pakistan and a failure to regain The Ashes against Australia with England drawing their home series in 2023 followed in 2025 by a devastating trio of losses in the opening three matches of the five match tour of Australia in 2025.

The Bazball era ended in July 2026 when coach Brendon McCullum stepped down and captain Ben Stokes retired from international cricket at the end of their 2-1 home series loss to New Zealand in 2026.

== Origins ==
=== Name ===
The name "Bazball" was coined by ESPN Cricinfo UK editor Andrew Miller on an episode of the Switch Hit podcast. This came after McCullum's appointment as England Test cricket coach, in May 2022. McCullum himself has voiced concern that the term can't express the nuances of the England team's approach or his management style. The name, however, has picked up increasing use across the wider cricketing media. McCullum after whom the term is named also dislikes the name 'Bazball'. He said "I don't really like that silly term ... I don't have any idea what ‘Bazball’ is. It's not just all crash and burn."

Baz is derived from Brendon McCullum's longstanding nickname. As a player he was renowned for his aggressive stroke play, and during his tenure as New Zealand captain, he led highly successful period characterised by an attacking approach. This approach, Steve McMorran wrote in Associated Press, meant McCullum managed "to upend the Black Caps' traditional conservative approach and underdog mindset."

McCullum's tenure as England's coach marked a turning point in the fortunes of the England Test cricket team. Before the appointments of Stokes and McCullum, the side had won only one of the last seventeen Test matches played under the previous captain Joe Root, who was "emotionally shattered after leading a struggling side through two difficult years which included multiple tours with testing COVID-enforced restrictions". With no dramatic change to the players selected, England "against all odds" experienced success: "their bowlers rose to the challenge, taking 20 wickets in six of the seven Test matches, while their batsmen scored at unprecedented pace. England won six of their seven Tests this summer, their second-most in a single season anywhere in the world." Only once (in 2004) had they won more, and in the time since "they had not even matched six wins, let alone bettered it."

=== Style ===
When Phillip Hughes died on the pitch, it was 2014, Brendon McCullum was captaining New Zealand. He said we are going to play without care, without consequence, because we are going to play every day as if it’s our last and to hell with judgment.

Two years later, he scored the fastest Test century in the history of the game, 54 balls against Australia. Bazball is a consequence of Phillip Hughes’ passing.

If you detach from consequence and you don't feel judged, you play freely. That's what this England side is doing at the moment and they're doing it so well. The seed was germinated through the passing of Phillip Hughes.

— Kerry O'Keeffe, 22 June 2023

One aspect of Bazball is batsmen taking the skills learned and honed playing one-day cricket and transposing them into the longer form, and traditionally slower, Test match game. Tim Wigmore in The Daily Telegraph wrote that the "path to Bazball runs directly from" the England captaincy of Eoin Morgan in the white-ball (one-day) form of the game who had overseen a period of success for England, including victory in the 2019 Cricket World Cup. During Morgan's first summer of captaincy of the England One Day International team he had urged his team to adopt more of the no-fear approach of the touring New Zealand side captained by Baz McCullum. For his part, Morgan told cricket journalist Firdose Moonda of ESPN Cricinfo that cricket from the Ben Stokes-Brendon McCullum partnership was "some of the best Test match series I've ever watched in my life" and that it was in the process of altering the notions and ideas that had been in place since the inaugural Test in 1877, saying "What England have proved this year [2022] is that you can play Test cricket in that [T20] fashion...It's made for unbelievable entertainment. It's created a new level of interest and proved that you don't have to play Test cricket one way, particularly as a batsman, which for, I suppose the 150 years, has always been one way."

Ben Stokes said the style was discussed from his very first meeting as captain with McCullum, with Stokes telling the media that "I have been thinking stuff like that but the first chat with Baz was 'yeah we can do it this way – why not?'... It has taken away all the external pressures of playing international sport. There's enough on individuals and as a team as it is but taking all the other stuff away is why everything is so relaxed, calm and enjoyable at the moment." He used the example of bowling at Rishabh Pant when he scored a century at greater than a run a ball, saying "The more we see players like that succeed, the more the negativity around that type of Test cricket will eventually die out because it is so exciting to watch, because cricket is an entertainment business. Yes, you want results but you want people to enjoy watching a spectacle. Yes, cricket has always been a spectacle but it's about doing it differently now. So yeah, cheers Rishabh." Cricket writer Huw Tuberville writing in The Cricketer in September 2022 said "I worry that Stokes' batting aggression – CricViz says he attacked 41 per cent of balls this summer compared to 24 per cent in 2019 – is underselling his talents."

Former Australian fast bowler Glenn McGrath drew parallels with the style of the McCullum-Stokes England team with his own Australian cricket team of the 1990s, but boosted by the changes brought about by one-day cricket, saying "The team I was lucky enough to play in, we just backed ourselves and played without fear. I think T20, if it's brought anything to cricket is players, especially batsmen, have to go out there and play without fear and that's moved up through ODIs to Test cricket and they're starting to play that way. To me, that's the way everyone should play cricket. When you've got a team that goes out there and backs themselves, they play without fear and it's amazing what you can achieve. With Brendon McCullum coming in, I think he's definitely bought that attitude."

Kerry O'Keefe, a former Australian cricketer, directly links the 2014 death of Phillip Hughes to the development of Bazball.

== Mindset ==
Ali Martin in The Guardian described the Bazball philosophy as "play positive red-ball [Test] cricket; to soak up pressure when required but also be brave enough to put it back on opponents at the earliest opportunity; to make taking wickets the sole aim in the field; and to strive chiefly for victory across the five days without considering the draw."

Cricket writer Chris Stocks identified seven principles of Bazball that could be promoted by a cricket coach in a team environment at the highest level of the game. They are:

1. A less reflective environment
2. No negative chat
3. A win-at-all-costs mentality
4. No fear of failure
5. Praise – even for the little things
6. Simplicity of message
7. Embracing mental freedom and fun

Stocks quoted veteran pace bowler Stuart Broad discussing the mental side of McCullum's approach when he said: "There's no doubt Baz has had an impact already. It's a very positive language in the changing room. It's very forward thinking. All about how to move this game forward."

== Impact on Test matches ==
=== 2022: Run chases ===
The change in style of play produced immediate results in the summer of 2022. The England Test match side were playing a three-match series against New Zealand and a one-off Test against India to conclude a previous series postponed by the COVID-19 pandemic. The previous summer, India and New Zealand had competed in the 2021 ICC World Test Championship Final. However, England in the summer of 2022 won all four matches chasing a total in the fourth innings, three against New Zealand and one against India, with those fourth innings chases being 277, 299, 296 and 378 runs. They became the first side in Test history to chase three scores of 250-plus in back-to-back games against New Zealand, and the first England side to ever win four consecutive Test matches batting last. Stokes as captain upon winning the toss began routinely in the summer of 2022 choosing to chase, something which goes against the orthodoxy in Test cricket but is the orthodoxy in limited-overs cricket.

=== Fast scoring rates ===
Since the inception of the style until June 2023, England averaged a run rate of 4.65 per over. This is significantly higher than the next highest in Test match history – Australia under Steve Waugh at 3.66. This has meant the team has bucked the trend of victorious sides of Test matches usually requiring 140 or more overs to win. On 1 December 2022, England reached a total of 506–4 at the end of first day's play in a Test match against Pakistan. These runs came in 75 overs at a run rate of 6.75, an unprecedented rate record in Test cricket. Had England faced the full 90 overs of a day's play at that run rate they would have passed 600. The previous record for the most runs on day one of a match was 494 set by Australia against South Africa 112 years previously in 1910. This innings also included England's highest ever total in the first session of a Test (174), Zak Crawley scoring the most runs in the first over of an innings ever by an England player (14), Crawley and Ben Duckett scoring the fastest ever England century opening stand (83 balls), Crawley and Duckett scoring the fastest opening double-century partnership in Test cricket history (181 balls), Harry Brook scoring England's third fastest century of all time (80 balls), and Crawley (86 balls) scoring the fastest ever by an England opener and the fifth fastest overall.

The desire to score quickly has been noted to have had an impact on the batting of Stokes himself who on occasion was "one batsman who has, perhaps, taken things too far on occasion... and fallen cheaply." England batsmen have also demonstrated innovation when facing Test match bowlers, such as Joe Root playing reverse-ramp shots against pace bowling, and batting left-handed.

=== Declarations ===
On 16 February 2023, fast scoring rates by the top order allowed England to declare their innings on the first day of a day/night Test match at the Bay Oval in Mount Maunganui on a tour of New Zealand, when the evening conditions were perceived to be a better time to be bowling rather than batting as a side. It was the second-earliest declaration in the first innings of a match in the history of Test cricket, and the speed of the scoring rate by the England batsmen allowed the declaration to be made to suit the conditions with Michael Atherton describing the "boldness" of the declaration as evidence of Stokes' "reputation as a captain unwilling to let the game stagnate or drift". Stokes declared in the opening innings of the 2023 Ashes series after just 78 overs of England's first innings, despite Joe Root being unbeaten on 118, in order to bowl at the Australian batsman for four overs on the first day. It was the earliest first-innings declaration in Ashes history. It was the fifth time Stokes had declared a first innings in his previous fourteen tests as captain. It moved him equal with former New Zealand captain Stephen Fleming for the most declarations in test history before the 110th over of an innings, but Fleming had taken 80 matches to reach that mark, and Stokes fifteen. Australia went on to win the test by two wickets in the dying overs of the fifth day.

=== Seeking results ===
A component of Bazball is said to be "confusionless cricket", and whilst "attacking all the time is the key, but not attacking blindly is the mantra" with it being "a meticulous approach of never letting the game die and always seeking results." Speaking after England chased a record run-chase in a Test in Nottingham in June 2022 against New Zealand at Trent Bridge, including a period of 102 runs in nine overs hit by Stokes and Jonny Bairstow, Stokes was quoted as saying "The message just was run into the fear of what the game was rather than stand still or back away from it...I'll say it quite simply: we were either winning this game or losing it. That was the mentality that we wanted all the batsmen coming in to have...It's obviously paid off. When you have the backing of the coach and captain, it rubs off on the players in a very positive way. So you're not fearing failure. You're just going out and doing what you want to do."

Stokes was quoted as using 'positivity' and 'aggression' which would involve risking defeat if it provides a better chance of winning. An aggressive, high-risk high-reward style was noted with England's leading all-time wicket taker James Anderson quoted as saying "We've got a captain and coach that don't want draws. We're not playing for draws." The desire to seek results to Test matches led to a Stokes declaration in Rawalpindi against Pakistan that was seen as a risk and "about 50 runs shy of what experts felt would be the ideal score to have enough cushion", only to win by 74 runs after giving Pakistan the chance to win. They played less defensively, leading to former Australian cricketer and now commentator Mark Waugh saying "Courageous, fearless positive mindset gets them a win in Rawalpindi on the most docile surface. I don't think any other team in world cricket would have rolled the dice like that."

=== Aggressive fields and bowling changes ===
Former Australian captain Ricky Ponting discussed the change brought about to the English Test team commenting on how McCullum had managed to "change the attitude of some of the English players to not be scared about getting out and to be fully committed to thinking about scoring runs and when you get the ball in your hand to be as aggressive as you can and set nice and aggressive fields." The England bowling unit under Stokes' captaincy has seen him encourage fast bowlers to bowl fuller, not to protect their bowling figures over moving the game forward, and to prioritise wickets over run protection at all times. This has not always been the convention in test match cricket. England off-spin bowler Jack Leach was quoted as saying "In teams I've played in, the way I've thought – a lot of the decisions are made around negativity...Stokes is going out the opposite way."

On the tour of Pakistan in late 2022 Stokes' use of "wacky" fielding positions and bowling changes was said to have helped his side achieve a series victory. The "aggressive field settings and constant tinkering" led McCullum to say that Stokes "is determined not just to drive this team but cricket forward. He seems to have taken captaincy to a new level...What we see on the field pulling the strings...he's constantly active, making plays and always thinking about wickets and he's so consistent with his message that he doesn't care about runs. That's one thing...his general positivity is quite staggering." Tactics in the field included moving fielders constantly, changing bowlers to improve match-ups, and utilising unconventional fielding positions including the use of leg slips, three men in front of square, and a back-stop.

=== Nighthawk ===
The Bazball era of English test cricket has seen the team at times eschew the traditional use of a nightwatchman, in favour of a "nighthawk". Instead of promoting a lower-order batsmen late in a day to protect the top order by blocking, the lower-order batter is asked to 'swing for the fences' to score and disorient the opponents. During the English summer test matches of 2022 on occasion Stuart Broad would be padded up for the last few overs of the day in order that, if called upon, he could attempt a few late evening blows to accelerate the scoring and cheer the crowd. Broad told Sky Sports that it was in England's first innings against New Zealand on his home ground of Trent Bridge in 2022 that McCullum suggested it to him, somewhat unexpectedly, "I went to make a coffee, in my flip flops, and Baz came up and said, 'you are in next, get your pads on. I think the crowd has gone a bit quiet, you are a local boy so try and hit your first ball for four and get them revved up again'." Broad, however, was never required in the role, and it was later on in the year that 18-year-old spin bowler Rehan Ahmed first got to be nighthawk, promoted to bat at number three in the Test match in Karachi against Pakistan on 19 December 2022. Broad would make his debut in the nighthawk role on 17 February 2023 in England's second innings in the first test in a series of two against New Zealand. He told BBC Sport that he was lying on the physio's bed when Brendon McCullum walked through the door and said "Hawk, it's time...You're going in next."

== Results ==
At the start of the McCullum coaching era the England side hosted a three game series against New Zealand, defeating the visitors in all three matches by chasing down 4th innings targets close to 300 runs in each game. McCullum was in charge for the delayed 5th test against India that was originally scheduled to be played in September 2021 but was delayed until July 2022, England chased down a 378 run target in the 4th innings, losing only 3 wickets with Joe Root and Jonny Bairstow finishing the match with a century each and a 269 run partnership. England continued a streak of good results with series wins against South Africa, Pakistan and a one-off test win vs Ireland. They drew a 2 match series 1-1 in New Zealand in 2023, the 2nd test being won by a single run. There were also series wins against the West Indies, Sri Lanka, Zimbabwe & New Zealand again.

=== Failures ===
Despite the success the team had playing the style, there were several significant failures. Pakistan took a 2-1 series win in their home series against England in 2024, England won the first Test by an innings and 47 runs after scoring a 823/7d, the fourth highest Test innings score of all time, in their only innings of the game with Root scoring 262 and Harry Brook 317. Their 454 run partnership broke the record for any England Test partnership and the all-time record for a 4th wicket partnership. Pakistan returned to defeat England by 152 runs in the 2nd Test then won the series with a comprehensive 9 wicket victory chasing just 37 runs in the 3rd Test.

England also failed to defeat India in two series, losing 4-1 playing away, winning the first test by 28 runs but losing the remaining four including a innings defeat in the 5th test in Dharmasala. Hosting India back in England in mid 2025, that 5 test series was draw 2-2, a series that fluctuated and ended with a 5th test where an England battling collapse followed another pair of centuries to Root & Brook, they lost Brook just after reaching 300 runs, then lost the remaining 6 wickets cheaply to lose the game by 6 runs. Brook was criticised by former England players Nasser Hussain and Michael Vaughan for his shot selection to be dismissed, as he attempted a shot across the line but lost control of the bat which flew 15 meters away toward square leg as Mohammed Siraj caught the ball.

=== The Ashes ===
The Ashes is viewed as the ultimate rivalry in Cricket, as England face their old colony Australia in a fixture with history going back to 1877 and what is now called the first ever Test Match. The 2023 Ashes series was in England, with Australia having the advantage of holding the Ashes they retained the trophy. Australia won the opening two games, lost the third and the fourth ended in a rain impacted draw with no play possible on the 5th day. England won the 5th Test by 49 runs, although it was a dead rubber in terms of England's ability to win back the Urn.

The 2025–26 Ashes series saw England lose the 5 game series in the shortest possible time to an Australian team without regular players Josh Hazlewood and Australian captain Pat Cummins due to injury. They were beaten handily in Perth, Brisbane and Adelaide, with the Perth test over in a lightning quick two days. Reactions from the Cricket media after the Adelaide loss proclaimed the "Death of Bazball" and predicted that regardless of results in the dead rubber 4th and 5th Tests that McCullum would be sacked or quit of his own volution, although the England Cricket Board ultimate elected to have McCullum continue in the role into the English 2026 summer season for Tests against New Zealand & Pakistan. McCullum and the England Cricket Board were criticised for poor preparation and a refusal to adjust to Australian weather and pitch conditions. England won the 4th Test in a two day game impacted by a diabolical seam friendly pitch with both teams being bowled out on the first day, the 2nd day saw Australia bowled out to set England 175 runs to win that was achieved in 33 overs for the loss of 6 wickets. The 5th Test was a more traditional Test batting surface and the game went the full 5 days in a high scoring game with Australia chasing down the target of 160 runs late on day 5.

=== "Bazball Dies Where It All Began" ===
Despite the belief in Cricket media that McCullum would quit or be sacked after the Ashes loss, he stayed on with England until June 2026 and the 3 match New Zealand tour of England. The first test, at Lord's in London, was a low scoring affair impacted by rain. England scraped to 140 runs in their first innings with a half-century to Harry Brook. New Zealand's top order was skittled early in their first innings for 113. England added 226 to their 27 run lead in their second innings, leaving New Zealand requiring 254 runs to win. The visitors collapsed to 138 all out as Gus Atkinson picked up two early wickets then cleaned up the tail as England won the match by 115 runs early on day 4 to take a 1-0 lead in the series.

Prior to the second Test there was a nightclub incident involving Atkinson and England's captain Ben Stokes. The pair had broken a midnight curfew and been involved in an altercation with Saracens Rugby Club player Totoa Auvaa. The pair were suspended during an independent investigation, missing the second test but returned for the third.

New Zealand took advantage of the absence of Stokes and Atkinson to level the series. They piled on 391 runs for the first innings with 100 to Glenn Phillips assisted by 51 from Tom Blundell the New Zealand wicketkeeper. England could only manage 291 in response, Matt Henry taking 5 wickets against the middle order. Henry Nicholls scored 121 in New Zealand's second innings, supported by half-centuries from Rachin Ravindra and Daryl Mitchell, the innings ended on 362 runs, leaving England needing 463 to win. They only managed 209, Joe Root's 77 the highest score, 58 to Harry Brook the next and no other batter scoring above 25. #3 batter Jacob Bethell and the four bowling tailenders Jofra Archer, Matthew Fisher, Josh Tongue all made ducks, with Tongue's a golden duck and Sonny Baker being the not out batsman also on 0.

The final Test began with a record partnership between New Zealand's Tom Latham and Devon Conway. Latham, the NZ Captain, scored 151 runs and Conway 157 to produce a rare triple century opening partnership of 317. It was the highest partnership for any wicket by a New Zealand pair against England. England scored 354 in their first innings, Ben Duckett with 113, Bethell 74 and Brook 58. New Zealand took the 84 run lead and added 288/9d. Mitchell scored a stoic 100 not out, grinding away with Rachin Ravindra's 94 the bulk of the scoring. Bowlers Zak Foulkes and Ben Sears held up their end for 13 overs worth of deliveries, Sears having to go off retired hurt as England's rain of bouncers threatened their wickets and their health, only to reappear shortly after Will O'Rourke was dismissed. Sears returned to see Mitchell through to his century and the declaration. The century was somewhat overshadowed by the announcement during play of England all-rounder Ben Stokes's retirement from international cricket. Stokes was in the middle of a long bowling spell and as the announcement rippled through the ground he captured the wicket of Foulkes. Having been set 373 runs to win Stokes used his Captain's prerogative to change the batting order, coming out as the non-striker to achieve the unusual statistical oddity of becoming only the 4th player in Test cricket history to have batted in every position from 1 to 11.

Chasing the 373, Stokes played in a manner reminiscent of limited overs cricket, briefly entertaining the crowd with a pair of 4's, and two huge 6's, but was quickly out for 30, caught by Mitchell off Foulkes only 145 minutes after the announcement was made. England ended the day with a mini-collapse described as "the death throes of Bazball", Duckett, Bethell and Brook joining Stokes before stumps. Starting from 130/4 on Day 5, England made it to lunch but not much further, all out for 212 with only Jamie Smith providing resistance before his dismissal as the final wicket of the match. New Zealand won the Test by 160 runs, the series in a 2-1 comeback win. The cricket media now firmly believed that McCullum's time as England coach as up, and this was summarised by former England Captain Michael Atherton with "Bazball Dies Where It All Began", a reference to where the style had begun against New Zealand in 2022, England winning all 3 games by chasing close to 300 runs on each occasion.

On 12 July 2026, Brendon McCullum was sacked as England’s Test coach, bringing the Bazball era to an end.

== Impact on wider game ==
=== Domestic English game ===
Changes in English domestic cricket came about in order to encourage an increased prevalence in the style of play closer to that sought by the England Test match team. Ahead of the 2023 English cricket season it was announced that attacking play would be encouraged in the County Championship, with fewer points awarded for drawn matches and maximum batting points only available to teams able to score at more than four runs an over. In January 2023, England captain Ben Stokes, managing director Rob Key, and Brendon McCullum over Zoom, addressed a meeting of directors of cricket from the first-class counties to discuss the way they intend the England team to play and the subsequent qualities needed in future international players. It was said they were looking to develop a culture in which no constraints of past processes exist, with a focus on optimising each player's unique strengths. This didn't mean each player had to play in the same buccaneering style as had been England's hallmark under McCullum and Stokes, but the style which best showcases them with a recognition that batsmen play the best when they can be mentally free. Jarrod Kimber when writing about McCullum's spell as New Zealand captain suggests that this has been a consistent theme for him, with Kimber writing "BazBall was a lifestyle choice...McCullum was just as happy to boost up [wicket-keeper] BJ Watling blocking as he was looking for players to smack it. It was about intent, invention and commitment. He was happy to let them fly and be the best versions of themselves".

=== Test cricket as a whole ===
With the popularity of Test cricket waning in some areas of the world and with some cricket administrators prioritising one-day and Twenty20 versions of the game, Paul Sutton writing for The Roar said "BazBall [could] not only revitalise England's cricket team but also give the game's traditional format the shot in the arm it so desperately needs." Revitalise was also a word used by former Australia captain Ricky Ponting when he told the ICC Review "So far it has been unbelievable, and it has actually almost reinvigorated Test match cricket again." Former Pakistan captain Urooj Mumtaz was quoted as saying after England played in Pakistan in December 2022: "England can be really proud. They're revolutionising Test cricket. They wanted to give Test cricket the life that it deserved. They want to be entertaining. And they've surely done that here in Pakistan."

Speaking after his first English summer as England coach McCullum discussed the responsibility to make the game appealing saying "you look at where Test cricket is around the world and how important it is to all of those who have played the game beforehand, and the relevance of it in international cricket. For us, it was a matter of trying to bring a bit of enjoyment back, try and bring the fans in to make sure they're enjoying Test cricket, and hopefully provide a bit more relevance to a game which has probably been under a little bit of pressure of late. That was the big goal and it will continue to be so moving forward."

Indian spinner Ravichandran Ashwin also cautioned against not adapting play to suit conditions, saying that playing on "certain types of wickets, when you try and attack every ball, you will falter. There are both advantages and disadvantages to this approach. Sometimes, on the wicket, conditions need to be respected." Whether the style would bear scrutiny against all opposition has been questioned. Former England opener Geoff Boycott was forthright and scathing in his assessment on the Daily Telegraph's Tuffers and Vaughany podcast, saying "If you think you are going to plunder the best bowlers in the world with a new conker when they are fresh then you are an idiot."

Critics argue that Bazball is not a sustainable long-term strategy for Test cricket. One concern is that this high-risk approach can lead to frequent batting collapses, as seen in the 2023 Ashes and the England tour to India 2023. Critics argue that Bazball undermines the balance between attack and defence, making them vulnerable to losing matches they might otherwise have won through a more measured approach.
