= History of Australian cricket from 1985–86 to 2000 =

This article describes the history of Australian cricket from the 1985–86 season until 2000.

This was a period in which Australian cricket recovered from the disruption caused by World Series Cricket to create, arguably, the strongest Test team in history. Allan Border was an inspirational figure during the recovery period in the late 1980s. In the 1990s, Australia's team included great players including Mark Taylor, Mark Waugh, Steve Waugh, Ian Healy, Shane Warne and Glenn McGrath. In the 2000s, players such as Ricky Ponting, Adam Gilchrist, Matthew Hayden and Michael Clarke helped continue Australia’s dominance.

== Domestic cricket ==
In 1999, the Australian Cricket Board announced a four-year sponsorship deal with Pura Milk which included renaming the Sheffield Shield to Pura Milk Cup (it became the Pura Cup in 2000).

=== Sheffield Shield winners ===
- 1985-86 – New South Wales
- 1986-87 – Western Australia
- 1987-88 – Western Australia
- 1988-89 – Western Australia
- 1989-90 – New South Wales
- 1990-91 – Victoria
- 1991-92 – Western Australia
- 1992-93 – New South Wales
- 1993-94 – New South Wales
- 1994-95 – Queensland
- 1995-96 – South Australia
- 1996-97 – Queensland
- 1997-98 – Western Australia
- 1998-99 – Western Australia

=== Pura Milk Cup winners ===
- 1999-2000 – Queensland

== International tours of Australia ==
=== India 1985-86 ===
For more information about this tour, see : Indian cricket team in Australia in 1985-86

=== New Zealand 1985-86 ===
For more information about this tour, see : New Zealand cricket team in Australia in 1985-86

=== England 1986-87 ===
For more information about this tour, see : English cricket team in Australia in 1986-87

=== West Indies 1986-87 ===
For more information about this tour, see : West Indian cricket team in Australia in 1986-87

=== England 1987-88 ===
For more information about this tour, see : English cricket team in Australia in 1987-88

=== New Zealand 1987-88 ===
For more information about this tour, see : New Zealand cricket team in Australia in 1987-88

=== Sri Lanka 1987-88 ===
For more information about this tour, see : Sri Lankan cricket team in Australia in 1987-88

=== Pakistan 1988-89 ===
For more information about this tour, see : Pakistani cricket team in Australia in 1988-89

=== West Indies 1988-89 ===
For more information about this tour, see : West Indian cricket team in Australia in 1988-89

=== New Zealand 1989-90 ===
For more information about this tour, see : New Zealand cricket team in Australia in 1989-90

=== Pakistan 1989-90 ===
For more information about this tour, see : Pakistani cricket team in Australia in 1989-90

=== Sri Lanka 1989-90 ===
For more information about this tour, see : Sri Lankan cricket team in Australia in 1989-90

=== England 1990-91 ===
For more information about this tour, see : English cricket team in Australia in 1990-91

=== New Zealand 1990-91 ===
For more information about this tour, see : New Zealand cricket team in Australia in 1990-91

=== India 1991-92 ===
For more information about this tour, see : Indian cricket team in Australia in 1991-92

=== Pakistan 1991-92 ===
For more information about this tour, see : Pakistani cricket team in Australia in 1991-92

=== West Indies 1991-92 ===
For more information about this tour, see : West Indian cricket team in Australia in 1991-92

=== Pakistan 1992-93 ===
For more information about this tour, see : Pakistani cricket team in Australia in 1992-93

=== West Indies 1992-93 ===
For more information about this tour, see : West Indian cricket team in Australia in 1992-93

=== New Zealand 1993-94 ===
For more information about this tour, see : New Zealand cricket team in Australia in 1993-94

=== South Africa 1993-94 ===
For more information about this tour, see : South African cricket team in Australia in 1993-94

=== England 1994-95 ===
For more information about this tour, see : English cricket team in Australia in 1994-95

=== Zimbabwe 1994-95 ===
For more information about this tour, see : Zimbabwean cricket team in Australia in 1994-95

=== Pakistan 1995-96 ===
For more information about this tour, see : Pakistani cricket team in Australia in 1995-96

=== Sri Lanka 1995-96 ===
For more information about this tour, see : Sri Lankan cricket team in Australia in 1995-96

=== West Indies 1995-96 ===
For more information about this tour, see : West Indian cricket team in Australia in 1995-96

=== Pakistan 1996-97 ===
For more information about this tour, see : Pakistani cricket team in Australia in 1996-97

=== West Indies 1996-97 ===
For more information about this tour, see : West Indian cricket team in Australia in 1996-97

=== New Zealand 1997-98 ===
For more information about this tour, see : New Zealand cricket team in Australia in 1997-98

=== South Africa 1997-98 ===
For more information about this tour, see : South African cricket team in Australia in 1997-98

=== England 1998-99 ===
For more information about this tour, see : English cricket team in Australia in 1998-99

=== Sri Lanka 1998-99 ===
For more information about this tour, see : Sri Lankan cricket team in Australia in 1998-99

=== India 1999-2000 ===
For more information about this tour, see : Indian cricket team in Australia in 1999-2000

=== Pakistan 1999-2000 ===
For more information about this tour, see : Pakistani cricket team in Australia in 1999-2000

== External sources ==
- CricketArchive – itinerary of Australian cricket
