= 2023 Ashes series =

Test cricket series between Australia and England

- Part of Australian cricket team in England in 2023
- The LV= Insurance Men's Ashes Series 2023 logo
- Date: 16 June – 31 July 2023
- Location: England
- Result: Five-match series drawn 2–2 (Australia retained The Ashes)
- Player of the series: Mitchell Starc (Aus); Chris Woakes (Eng); Compton–Miller Medal: Chris Woakes
Teams
- England: Australia
Captains
- Ben Stokes: Pat Cummins
Most runs
- Zak Crawley (480) Joe Root (412) Ben Stokes (405): Usman Khawaja (496); Steve Smith (373); Travis Head (362)
Most wickets
- Stuart Broad (22) Chris Woakes (19) Mark Wood (14): Mitchell Starc (23); Pat Cummins (18); Josh Hazlewood (16)

The 2023 Ashes series, branded as the LV= Insurance Men's Ashes Series for sponsorship reasons, was a series of Test cricket matches played between England and Australia for the Ashes in June and July 2023. The five-match series was a part of the 2023–2025 ICC World Test Championship, the venues being Edgbaston, Lord's, Headingley, Old Trafford and The Oval.

The result was a 2–2 draw, with Australia retaining the Ashes (having won in 2021–22).

The 2023 series was the 73rd Ashes series and the 37th to take place in England. Uniquely for a series hosted by England, there were no Tests in August, the dates having been brought forward to avoid a clash with The Hundred tournament. It was also the first time in which Australia played no matches against English county teams, although they did face India in the 2023 ICC World Test Championship final a week before the start of the series.

The series was closely and, at times, acrimoniously contested at a time when the continued relevance of Test cricket was being called into question in comparison with shorter forms of the game. The ability of the England team to recover following two narrow defeats with two narrow victories has been ascribed to their introduction of the aggressive Bazball style of play. Australian players Usman Khawaja and Mitchell Starc topped the batting and bowling charts with totals of 496 runs and 23 wickets respectively. The England team were known for the age of their bowlers, with their bowling line-up for the fourth Test being the oldest in 95 years.

Locations of the Tests

== Squads ==
England	Australia
Ben Stokes (c); Ollie Pope (vc, wk); Rehan Ahmed; Moeen Ali; James Anderson; Jonny Bairstow (wk); Stuart Broad; Harry Brook; Zak Crawley; Ben Duckett; Dan Lawrence; ~~Jack Leach~~; Matthew Potts; Ollie Robinson; Joe Root; Josh Tongue; Chris Woakes; Mark Wood	Pat Cummins (c); Steve Smith (vc); Scott Boland; Alex Carey (wk); Cameron Green; Marcus Harris; Josh Hazlewood; Travis Head; Josh Inglis (wk); Usman Khawaja; Marnus Labuschagne; Nathan Lyon; Mitchell Marsh; Todd Murphy; Michael Neser; Jimmy Peirson (wk); Mitchell Starc; David Warner

England announced their squad on 3 June 2023, whilst Australia announced theirs on 18 April 2023. Jimmy Peirson was added to the Australia squad as cover for Josh Inglis. On 4 June 2023, Jack Leach was ruled out of the series with back stress fracture; Moeen Ali was named as his replacement. On 23 June 2023, Rehan Ahmed was added to England's squad as a cover for Moeen Ali who suffered blisters in his spinning finger during the first Test. On 3 July 2023, Australia's Nathan Lyon was ruled out of the last three Tests due to an injury, with Michael Neser added to the squad. On the same day, Australia's Matt Renshaw and England's Rehan Ahmed were both released from their respective squads. On 4 July, Ollie Pope was ruled out the final three Tests due to a dislocated shoulder sustained whilst fielding in the second Test.

== Matches ==
=== First Test ===
16–20 June 2023
Scorecard

England	v	Australia
393/8d (78 overs); Joe Root 118* (152); Nathan Lyon 4/149 (29 overs)		386 (116.1 overs); Usman Khawaja 141 (321); Ollie Robinson 3/55 (22.1 overs)
273 (66.2 overs); Harry Brook 46 (52); Pat Cummins 4/63 (18.2 overs)		282/8 (92.3 overs); Usman Khawaja 65 (197); Stuart Broad 3/64 (21 overs)

Australia won by 2 wickets
Edgbaston, Birmingham
Umpires: Marais Erasmus (SA) and Ahsan Raza (Pak)
Player of the match: Usman Khawaja (Aus)

- England won the toss and elected to bat.
- Only 32.4 overs of play was possible on Day 3 due to rain.
- No play was possible before lunch on Day 5 due to rain.
- Usman Khawaja (Aus) became the second Australian player (thirteenth player overall) to bat on all five days of a Test match.
- Cameron Green (Aus) reached 1,000 runs in Tests
- Joe Root (Eng) scored his 30th Test century
- World Test Championship points: Australia 12, England −2. (Note: England were deducted two WTC points for maintaining a slow over-rate while bowling.)

==== Day one ====
Australia entered the first Test with the decision whether to select Scott Boland ahead of either Josh Hazlewood or Mitchell Starc, after his performance against India in the World Test Championship final in the previous week. Ultimately Boland was selected ahead of the left-arm fast bowler Starc.

England won the first toss of the series and elected to bat first. Australia captain Pat Cummins opened the bowling with Zak Crawley striking the very first ball of the innings for four. Ben Duckett was caught behind for 12 off Hazlewood in the fourth over. Ollie Pope then fell for 31, lbw to Nathan Lyon at the end of the 18th over. Crawley reached his half-century two balls later. However, with two balls remaining before the lunch break, Crawley was caught behind on review for 61 off Boland, meaning England entered the lunch break on the first morning 124/3.

After lunch, Harry Brook (32) and captain Ben Stokes (1) were both dismissed in the space of nine balls, with Joe Root and Jonny Bairstow seeing England through to tea on 240/5. Five balls after tea, Root reverse scooped Boland for six. Bairstow (78), followed by Moeen Ali (18), were both stumped by wicketkeeper Alex Carey, before Stuart Broad (16) was bowled by all-rounder Cameron Green. Root reached his fourth Ashes century and 30th Test century overall in the 76th over. After scoring 20 runs off it, England declared at the end of the 78th over on 393/8 with Root 118* and Ollie Robinson 17*. Australia's openers were sent in to face four overs before the close of play in which they reached 14/0.

==== Day two ====
Day two began five minutes later than scheduled due to the boundary rope needing to be laid out. In the 11th over Broad claimed the wicket of David Warner (9) for the 15th time in Tests, before dismissing Marnus Labuschagne the very next ball for a golden duck. Stokes then removed Steve Smith (16) in the 27th over, leaving Australia 78/3 at lunch.

Both Usman Khawaja and Travis Head reached half-centuries after lunch, the latter falling to Moeen Ali for exactly 50 in the 46th over. Two balls later Bairstow missed a chance to stump new batter Cameron Green. Australia reached tea without losing any further wickets on 188/4. In the evening session, Moeen Ali bowled Green for 38 in the 68th over, before Khawaja cut Stokes for four to bring up his 15th Test century and first in England in the next over. In the 81st over and having taken the new ball, Stuart Broad bowled Khawaja but the umpire deemed that Broad overstepped, resulting in a no-ball and therefore no wicket. Australia closed on 311/5, 82 runs behind England.

==== Day three ====
In the morning session, James Anderson bowled Carey for 66, before Ollie Robinson finally dismissed Khawaja for 141. This wicket resulted in Robinson giving Khawaja a "send off", being accused of verbally abusing the Australian batsman after taking his wicket. England went on to claim the remaining wickets before the lunch break, leaving Australia 386 all out and a first innings deficit of 7 runs.

Beginning their second innings and looking to extend their slender lead, England reached 26/0 in 6.5 overs before rain stopped play. Play resumed 105 minutes later, with tea pushed back from its scheduled time by 80 minutes. The rain returned 20 minutes later, however, to stop play once again, although in that time both of England's openers, Duckett and Crawley, fell in the space of four deliveries to Cummins and Boland, respectively. Tea was taken, but the remainder of the day's play was called off.

==== Day four ====
England resumed their innings on 28/2, but Cummins bowled Pope (14) in the 17th over. As Harry Brook took the attack to Australia, Root (46) was stumped by Carey off Lyon four runs short of a half-century in the 26th over. Brook fell for the same number of runs as Root, again off the bowling of spinner Lyon, in the 34th over. In the last over before lunch, Bairstow was given out lbw by umpire Erasmus but the decision was overturned on review with the ball going on to miss leg stump. England reached lunch on 155/5, a lead of 162 runs.

After lunch, Bairstow (20) fell lbw to Lyon, before Stokes (43) also fell lbw this time to Cummins three overs later, with Stokes failing to overturn on review. England lost their eighth wicket in the 55th over, Ali (19) gloving to Carey off Hazlewood. Lyon then got Robinson for 27 and James Anderson, in at 10, reverse-swept Lyon for four the very next ball. Anderson was the last wicket to fall, Cummins taking his wicket, but not before adding 12 runs, leaving England 273 all out and setting Australia a target of 281 runs to win the first Test.

Australia started their chase with two consecutive fours from Khawaja inside the first over. Warner (36) was the first wicket to fall, in the 18th over, caught behind off Robinson. Labuschagne fell four overs later for 13, capping a poor Test by his standards. A further four overs later and Smith was caught behind off Broad for just 6, bringing Scott Boland to the crease as nightwatchman. Boland and Khawaja survived until close with Australia on 107/3, still requiring 174 runs to win with three sessions of cricket still to play.

==== Day five ====
The final day did not begin until 2:15 p.m. due to the weather. Australia lost their fourth wicket in the eighth over of the day, Boland (20) caught behind off Broad. Ali then got Head caught by Root in the 45th over, leaving Australia 138 runs behind with five wickets remaining. Khawaja then reached another half-century, before taking Australia to tea on 183/5 with Cameron Green, requiring 98 runs.

After tea, Robinson bowled Green for 28, before Stokes dismissed Khawaja for 65, bringing Cummins at 9 to the crease. England chose not to take the new ball when it became available and got their reward, taking Australia's eighth wicket, Carey caught and bowled by Root. Australia at this point still required 54 runs with just two wickets remaining. Despite taking the new ball, England could not take the remaining two wickets required and Cummins and number 10 batter Lyon chased down the remaining runs to win by two wickets.

=== Second Test ===
28 June–2 July 2023
Scorecard

Australia	v	England
416 (100.4 overs); Steve Smith 110 (184); Josh Tongue 3/98 (22 overs)		325 (76.2 overs); Ben Duckett 98 (134); Mitchell Starc 3/88 (17 overs)
279 (101.5 overs); Usman Khawaja 77 (187); Stuart Broad 4/65 (24.5 overs)		327 (81.3 overs); Ben Stokes 155 (214); Pat Cummins 3/69 (25 overs)

Australia won by 43 runs
Lord's, London
Umpires: Chris Gaffaney (NZ) and Ahsan Raza (Pak)
Player of the match: Steve Smith (Aus)

- England won the toss and elected to field.
- Ben Duckett (Eng) reached 1,000 runs in Tests
- Nathan Lyon (Aus) played in his 100th consecutive Test match. However he injured his calf in the match, ending the streak that began in 2013.
- This was the first time since 2001 that Australia had won the first two Tests of an Ashes series in England.
- Ben Stokes' second innings contained nine sixes – the most in an Ashes innings, and his 155 is the second highest by an England batter in the fourth innings of an Ashes Test.
- World Test Championship points: Australia 12, England −9. (Note: England were deducted nine WTC points for maintaining a slow over-rate while bowling.)

==== Day one ====
Australia went into the second Test making one change to their line-up with Mitchell Starc returning in place of Scott Boland. England also made one change, bringing in pace bowler Josh Tongue for only his second Test and Ashes debut, to replace Moeen Ali, who suffered a finger injury in the previous Test. England won a second consecutive toss and opted to bowl first. Australia began the morning session well and, after a very brief rain delay, David Warner brought up a half-century with a six in the 22nd over. Two overs later, Tongue bowled Usman Khawaja for 17 to pick up his first Ashes wicket. This wicket also brought the lunch break with Australia 73/1.

After lunch, rain stopped play but once again the delay was short lived and soon after Tongue picked up a second wicket, this time bowling Warner for 66. Steve Smith was given out caught behind off Stuart Broad but the decision was overturned on review with replays showing a clear gap between bat and ball. Marnus Labuschagne was also given out off Broad, this time for lbw, but again the decision was overturned on review with ball tracking suggesting the ball would go on to miss the stumps. Smith then reached 9,000 Test runs, the second-fastest to reach that milestone after Kumar Sangakkara. Australia reached tea on 190/2.

After tea, Ollie Robinson got Labuschagne caught behind for 47 and Smith brought up his half-century in the 61st over, which was soon followed by Travis Head's 50 off 48 balls. Head was later stumped by Jonny Bairstow off Joe Root for 77, and new batter Cameron Green fell to Root three balls later for a duck. England took the new ball with two overs remaining before stumps, but Australia held out to reach 339/5 at the close.

==== Day two ====
In the second over of the morning, Alex Carey fell lbw to Broad for 22, with the original not out decision being overturned on review. Starc was out three overs later, caught behind off James Anderson for 6. Smith then brought up his 32nd Test century with a cover drive for four in the 92nd over. He was finally out for 110 four overs later, falling to Tongue for his third wicket of the innings. Robinson then got Nathan Lyon for 7 in the 99th over, before taking the final wicket of Josh Hazlewood (4) to bowl Australia out for 416. England survived four overs in their reply before lunch, going in 13/0.

Almost immediately after drinks midway through the afternoon session, Carey's fourth stumping of the series thus far off Lyon dismissed Crawley two runs shy of a half-century. Ben Duckett reached his half-century in the 29th over and the next over brought up a fifty partnership with Ollie Pope, with England reaching tea on 145/1.

After tea, Lyon suffered a calf injury in the field which would ultimately rule him out for the remainder of the series. Australia then reverted to short-pitched bowling to great reward. Firstly, Pope, also nursing an injury, fell to Green for 42. Three balls later, Root gloved a catch to Carey off Green but was given as a no-ball. Soon after, Duckett fell two runs short of a second century in the series, top edging a catch to Warner off Hazlewood. Root then fell to a highly disputed catch from Steve Smith, with the decision ultimately being given out by third umpire Marais Erasmus. No further wickets fell before close, with England on 278/4, 138 runs behind.

==== Day three ====
Second ball of the morning session had Ben Stokes falling to Starc for 17. Harry Brook went on to reach a half-century, before splicing a short ball to Pat Cummins off Starc in the very next over. Bairstow was next to fall, giving Cummins another catch, this time off Hazlewood for 16 in the 73rd over. Three overs later and England lost two quick wickets, Robinson (9) and Broad (12) falling in the space of five balls to the spin of Head. Just three balls later and last man Anderson was out to Cummins for 1, England all out for 325 giving Australia a 91-run lead. Warner and Khawaja successfully negotiated a potentially tricky six-over spell up to lunch, with Australia on 12/0.

After lunch, Australia continued to extend their lead without loss up until the drinks break, after which Tongue trapped Warner lbw for 25, the Australian batter failing to overturn the out decision on review. Labuschagne was given out lbw to Tongue two overs later but successfully overturned the decision with ball tracking having the impact hitting outside the line of off stump. Khawaja and Labuschagne took Australia to 81/1 at tea, a lead of 172, despite the latter surviving two huge lbw appeals in the over before tea.

In the evening session, Khawaja continued his good form by bringing up another half-century. Labuschagne survived yet another lbw appeal, which had England reviewed, would have been overturned and given out. He did finally fall in the 41st over, caught at backward point off Anderson for 30. Umpires took the players off at 5:10 p.m. due to rain and play was abandoned for the day at 5:45 p.m., leaving Australia 130/2 at the close with a lead of 221.

==== Day four ====
Day four began five minutes later than scheduled due to a brief rain shower before play. Smith struck the first ball of the morning for four. Khawaja and Smith took Australia beyond the drinks break unscathed but the former fell immediately afterwards, caught at fine leg off Broad for 77. In the next over, Anderson dropped a straightforward catch from new batter Head, before Tongue got Smith the next ball for 34. Five overs later and Head fell to Broad for 7. Carey and Green saw Australia to the slightly later lunch break on 222/5, leading by 313 runs.

Robinson managed to take the wickets of Green (18) and Carey (21) midway through the afternoon session, and Stokes had Cummins caught at point off a no-ball. Three overs later however Cummins did fall, caught at gully for 11 off Broad. Stokes got Hazlewood in the next over for just 1, leaving the injured Lyon hobbling out to the middle to join Starc. Lyon batted admirably, including hitting a four, but was caught at midwicket in the same over by Stokes off Broad, ending Australia's second innings at 279 and giving England a target of 371 to win the second Test.

England's chase began after the tea break, with Crawley falling to Starc for 3 in the third over. Two balls later and Duckett successfully overturned an lbw decision. In the fifth over, Starc struck again, this time bowling Pope for 3. Root and Duckett steadied the innings until the 13th over, in which Cummins got both Root (18), caught at slip and new batter Brook (4), who was bowled, in the space of four deliveries leaving England 46/4. Duckett and Stokes launched a counter-attack, with the former bringing up a half-century off 62 balls in the 28th over. The next over came the first of two moments of debate and controversy in this match, with third umpire Erasmus deeming Starc to have put down a catch in the deep off Duckett by grounding the ball on the floor before being in control of his body. England reached the close at 7:10 p.m. on 114/4, still requiring 257 runs to win.

==== Day five ====
The morning session began with Duckett and Stokes playing positively, the latter successfully overturning an lbw decision given against him, and bringing up a half-century in the 41st over. In the first over after drinks, Hazlewood took the wicket of Duckett for 83, again falling short of a century. Then followed the second of the two moments of debate and controversy in the match. At the end of the 52nd over, Bairstow ducked a Cameron Green bouncer and walked out of his crease to talk to Stokes at the non-striker's end. Wicketkeeper Carey threw down the stumps with Australia celebrating, the decision again being sent to third umpire Erasmus who decided that the ball was live at the moment the bails were dislodged and therefore Bairstow was given out stumped. Laws of Cricket 20.1.2 and 20.2 place the onus on the umpire to decide when the ball is considered dead by both sides or finally settled in the hands of the wicketkeeper. After this moment, Stokes upped his counter-attack and struck three consecutive sixes to bring up a 13th Test and fourth Ashes hundred, before also bringing up a 50-run stand with Broad on the stroke of lunch. This left England on 243/6, still requiring 128 runs to win.

The lunch break saw unsavoury scenes in the Lord's Long Room, with three MCC members suspended – one for life – for their part in an incident with various Australia players for "abusive, offensive or inappropriate behaviour or language". After lunch, Broad and Stokes continued to build their partnership and the latter resumed his explosive innings, bringing up his 150 in the 69th over before eventually falling to Hazlewood for 155. Stokes' innings contained nine fours and nine sixes. England still required 70 runs at the point of Stokes' departure. Robinson (1) fell in the next over to Cummins and Broad (11) the over after to Hazlewood. England's last wicket partnership survived for seven overs and took them within 44 runs of their target before Starc bowled Tongue to secure a 43-run victory for Australia and to go 2–0 up in the series.

=== Third Test ===
6–10 July 2023 (Note: While five days of play were scheduled for each Test, the third Test reached a result in four days.)
Scorecard

Australia	v	England
263 (60.4 overs); Mitchell Marsh 118 (118); Mark Wood 5/34 (11.4 overs)		237 (52.3 overs); Ben Stokes 80 (108); Pat Cummins 6/91 (18 overs)
224 (67.1 overs); Travis Head 77 (112); Stuart Broad 3/45 (14.1 overs)		254/7 (50 overs); Harry Brook 75 (93); Mitchell Starc 5/78 (16 overs)

England won by 3 wickets
Headingley, Leeds
Umpires: Kumar Dharmasena (SL) and Nitin Menon (Ind)
Player of the match: Mark Wood (Eng)

- England won the toss and elected to field.
- Steve Smith (Aus) played his 100th Test.
- Moeen Ali (Eng) took his 200th Test wicket in 66 matches.
- Ben Stokes (Eng) reached 10,000 runs in first class cricket.
- Only 25.1 overs of play was possible on Day 3 due to rain.
- Harry Brook (Eng) scored his 1,000th run in Tests. He became the fastest to score 1,000 runs in Tests in terms of balls faced (1,058).
- World Test Championship points: England 12, Australia 0.

==== Day one ====
Facing a 2–0 deficit in a home series for the first time since 2001, England made three changes to their team, with one being enforced. Ollie Pope dropped out having been ruled out of the series entirely and Moeen Ali came back into the side following his finger injury. Both James Anderson and Josh Tongue were rested, the latter after only featuring in the previous Test, bringing in bowlers Mark Wood and Chris Woakes for their first appearances of the series.

Australia also made three changes, two enforced due to injuries to Nathan Lyon and Cameron Green in the previous Test. Spinner Todd Murphy and all-rounder Mitchell Marsh were their respective direct replacements, whilst Josh Hazlewood dropped out for the returning Scott Boland.

England won a third consecutive toss and opted to bowl first. David Warner drove the first ball of the morning off Broad for four, but fell to him four balls later for the 16th time in Tests. Ollie Robinson opened the bowling with Broad, with Mark Wood coming into the attack in the seventh over. Wood produced speeds of up to 95 mph during his spell, in which he bowled Usman Khawaja for 13. Marnus Labuschagne fell to Woakes for 21 in the 20th over, and Broad dismissed Steve Smith five overs later, caught behind for 22. Australia entered lunch on 91/4.

During the afternoon session, Marsh brought up a 102-ball century, whilst Robinson left the field mid-over after suffering a back spasm. On the stroke of tea, Woakes finally had Marsh caught at slip for 118 leaving Australia 240/5. After tea, Head fell for 39, again Woakes with the wicket, Joe Root taking the catch after dropping Alex Carey the previous delivery. Two overs later and Wood returned to dismiss Mitchell Starc (2) and Pat Cummins (0) in the space of three deliveries. Wood got his fourth wicket two overs later, dismissing Carey for 8. Wood then completed his five wicket haul by taking the last wicket of Murphy for 13 to end Australia's innings on 263, completing a collapse of 6–23 in just 8.2 overs. Duckett fell for 2 to Cummins early in England's reply and two overs later had Harry Brook, batting at three instead of his usual five, caught at second slip for 3. England then lost Crawley (33) to Marsh before the close to end the day on 68/3.

==== Day two ====
Joe Root was out second ball of the morning for 19, nicking off to first slip off Cummins. Starc then got Jonny Bairstow for 12. Stokes and Ali then rebuilt before the latter attempted a pull off Cummins only to be caught by Smith at fine leg for 21, having gotten away with a similar shot two balls prior. Woakes joined Ali back in the pavilion on the stroke of lunch, making a run-a-ball 10 before falling to the short ball trap once more off Starc. England went into lunch 142/7.

Immediately after lunch, new batter Wood struck 18 runs off the first over including two sixes and a four. Wood hit another six in the next over, but was caught at midwicket soon after off Cummins after making 24 off 8 balls. Broad fell for 8 four overs later again off Cummins, whilst Stokes attacked the Australian bowling at the other end. Stokes continued his assault for the last wicket stand, hitting a further five sixes while bringing up his half-century, before finally falling for 80 to the spin of Murphy, leaving England all out for 237 and a first innings deficit of 26.

In the third over of Australia's second batting innings, Broad dismissed Warner (1) for the second time in the Test and 17th time in all Tests as Australia reached tea on 29/1, a lead of 55. After tea, Moeen Ali quickly picked up the wickets of the two danger men, Labuschagne (33) and Smith (2), the latter his 200th wicket in Tests. After the drinks break, Woakes dismissed Khawaja caught behind for 43 as Head and Marsh put together a partnership to see Australia to close on 116/4, leading by 142.

==== Day three ====
Play on day three was delayed until the evening session due to the weather, with only one over being bowled before play was interrupted once more. The delay only lasted 20 minutes however, and Woakes managed to remove both Marsh (28) and Carey (5) after the resumption. Wood came on to take the wickets of Starc (16) and Cummins (1), after which Head took the attack to England, bringing up his half-century with a boundary. Murphy fell lbw to Broad for 11, after which Head struck consecutive sixes to extend Australia's lead, before falling to Broad for 77. Australia ended up all out for 224, setting England a target of 251 to win. England's chase began after 7 p.m., with Australia going wicketless in the five overs until close with England on 27/0.

==== Day four ====
England lost their first wicket five overs into the morning as Duckett fell lbw to Starc for 23. Surprisingly, Moeen Ali came out to bat at three after the Brook experiment failed in the first innings. This also failed as Ali was bowled by Starc for just 5. Root came in to establish a partnership with Crawley, but it was the opener who fell next for 44 as he was caught behind off Marsh to leave England 93/3. Brook, in at his usual spot of five, played himself in before upping his scoring with boundaries off Boland and Starc. Root gloved an attempted pull down the leg side to Carey off Cummins for 21, with next batter Stokes clipping his first delivery for four. Brook and Stokes saw England through to lunch on 153/4, with the target now down to double figures on 98 required.

Stokes fell second over after lunch, a similar dismissal to Root as he edged down the leg side to Carey off Starc for 13. Bairstow came and went two overs later, bowled by Starc for 5. Woakes joined Brook at the crease, with Brook bringing up a crucial half-century off 67 balls. Brook was dismissed after drinks however, top edging a catch to Cummins off Starc for 75, with the bowler and fielder nearly colliding going for the catch. With the last recognised batsman gone, England still required 21. Wood joined his bowling partner Woakes in the middle, and repeating his first innings approach, struck an 8-ball 16 whilst Woakes hit the winning runs with a drive through point to the boundary to finish 32* and secure a 3-wicket victory for England, pulling one back in the series at 2–1 heading to Old Trafford.

=== Fourth Test ===
19–23 July 2023
Scorecard

Australia	v	England
317 (90.2 overs); Mitchell Marsh 51 (60); Chris Woakes 5/62 (22.2 overs)		592 (107.4 overs); Zak Crawley 189 (182); Josh Hazlewood 5/126 (27 overs)
214/5 (71 overs); Marnus Labuschagne 111 (173); Mark Wood 3/27 (11 overs)

Match drawn
Old Trafford, Manchester
Umpires: Nitin Menon (Ind) and Joel Wilson (WI)
Player of the match: Zak Crawley (Eng)

- England won the toss and elected to field.
- Only 30 overs of play was possible on Day 4 due to rain.
- No play was possible on Day 5 due to rain.
- Stuart Broad (Eng) took his 600th Test wicket, the fifth bowler to reach the milestone.
- Moeen Ali (Eng) reached 3,000 runs in Tests, the fourth Englishman to reach both 3,000 runs and 200 wickets in Tests.
- Zak Crawley (Eng) reached 2,000 runs in Tests.
- Mark Wood (Eng) took his 100th Test wicket.
- Australia retained the Ashes as a result of this match.
- World Test Championship points: England 1, Australia −6. (Note: England and Australia were deducted three and ten WTC points, respectively, for maintaining a slow over-rate while bowling.)

==== Day one ====
England made one change to their starting XI with James Anderson, on his home ground, replacing Ollie Robinson. Australia dropped their frontline spinner Todd Murphy for the returning Josh Hazlewood, whilst Cameron Green returned in place of seamer Scott Boland, leaving part-timers as the only spinners in their bowling attack. England won a fourth consecutive toss and elected to bowl, and David Warner hit the first ball of the match for four. Usman Khawaja was the first batter to fall, lbw to Broad for 3 in the fifth over. Almost immediately after the drinks break, Woakes had Warner caught behind for 32. A partnership of 46 from Steve Smith and Marnus Labuschagne saw Australia through to lunch on 107/2.

Five overs after lunch, Wood got Smith out lbw for 41, the initial not out decision by umpire Menon being reviewed by England and overturned by DRS. Labuschagne brought up a half-century in the 46th over but was out in the next over for 51, trapped lbw by Moeen Ali and like Smith before him, was given not out on-field but overturned by DRS on review. Australia reached tea on 187/4.

Five balls after tea, Stuart Broad picked up his 600th Test wicket, seeing Travis Head caught by Joe Root two runs shy of a half-century. Broad became only the fifth man to reach 600 wickets in Tests. Mitchell Marsh and Cameron Green brought up a fifty partnership in the 60th over, with Marsh himself reaching 50 from 56 balls two overs later. In the next over, Woakes dismissed both Green, lbw for 16, and Marsh four balls later, sensationally caught by Jonny Bairstow behind the stumps for 51. Alex Carey and Mitchell Starc struck up a 29-run partnership before England took the new ball when it was available and with it Woakes immediately dismissed Carey, caught behind for 20. Australia ended the day 299/8.

==== Day two ====
Pat Cummins fell for 1 to the first ball of the morning, James Anderson picking up his first wicket of the match. The next over, Woakes had Hazlewood caught at slip but had overstepped for a no-ball. Woakes did get Hazlewood a few overs later, caught at third slip by Ben Duckett for 4, securing his first Ashes five-wicket haul. Australia's innings finished on 317 all out. Zak Crawley, like Warner before him, and like he did off the first ball of the entire series, struck the first ball of the innings for four. Duckett was caught behind off Starc for 1 in the third over, bringing Moeen Ali to the crease at 3. Ali reached 3,000 Test runs in the 14th over with a boundary off Cummins, and along with Crawley saw England through to lunch on 61/1.

After lunch, England upped their scoring rate and took the attack to the bowlers. Crawley reached his half-century in the 23rd over with a four, followed immediately by a six to bring up England's 100. Crawley then reached the milestone of 2,000 Test runs, and this was soon followed by Ali's half-century off 74 balls, his first 50 since 2019. However three overs later Ali holed out to Khawaja for 54 off Starc. Root got off the mark immediately with a pull for four. Crawley and Root continued their attack and Crawley reached his century off just 93 balls in the 33rd over, and the two batters took England to tea on 239/2 with the afternoon session bringing 178 runs from 25 overs, a run rate of 7.12.

Root brought up his own half-century from 45 balls after tea with a reverse ramp shot off Cummins, which was soon followed by Crawley reaching 150. Crawley finally departed for 189 off 182 balls in the 57th over, bowled by Green. Five overs later Root fell for 84, a Hazlewood delivery keeping very low and bowling the former England captain. Ben Stokes and Harry Brook saw England to stumps on 384/4 with a lead of 67.

==== Day three ====
In the second over of the morning, Carey missed an opportunity to run out Stokes, dropping the ball before breaking the bails with his gloves. Stokes went on to reach his half-century in the 82nd over, but two overs later Cummins had him bowled for 51 off 74 balls. Brook brought up a half-century of his own, his second consecutive 50, in the 86th over. Australia took the new ball in the 91st over, 11 overs after it became available. They were rewarded an over later as Hazlewood had Brook caught at deep backward square for 61. This brought Woakes to the crease but he fell for a golden duck, England's first duck of the series, an over later to Hazlewood. Wood, in at number 9, was out for 6 on the stroke of lunch, bowled by Hazlewood for his fourth wicket. This left England on 506/8, by far their biggest score of the series so far, and a lead of 189 runs.

The afternoon session lasted just 3 deliveries before rain took the players off, but soon cleared and play was back under way inside 13 minutes. Hazlewood completed his five-for with the dismissal of Broad for 7, taking a catch off his own bowling. Last batter Anderson joined Bairstow in the middle, and Bairstow took the attack to Australia, bringing up a half-century with a six. Bairstow continued to dominate Australia's bowling with fours and sixes, before being left stranded on 99* after Anderson was trapped lbw by Green for 5. Bairstow became the seventh man in Tests to be left on 99* and only the second in Ashes cricket behind Steve Waugh. England's extraordinary innings ended on 592 all out, a first innings lead of 275 runs. Scoring at 5.49 runs per over, it was the third fastest batting innings to reach 500 runs, behind two of England's innings against Pakistan and Ireland both occurring within the past eight months. It was also the first time since the fifth Test of the 1985 Ashes that England have reached 500 in a home Ashes series.

Australia lost the first wicket of their second innings in the 11th over, Wood finding the edge of Khawaja's bat; after an unsuccessful review of the on-field 'out' decision, Khawaja departed for 18. Australia reached a slightly delayed tea on 39/1 from 12 overs, still 236 runs behind. Warner was first to fall after tea, bowled by Woakes for 28. Labuschagne and Smith built up a partnership of 43, before Wood took his 100th Test wicket by removing Smith caught behind for 17. Four overs later it was Wood again who took the next wicket, Duckett catching Head in the gully for 1. Marsh and Labuschagne saw Australia to a delayed close at 6:43 p.m. on 113/4, trailing by 162 runs but with the following day's play under threat of being severely affected by the weather.

==== Day four ====
As expected, no play was possible in the morning session due to poor weather, but with the rain easing early in the afternoon, play was scheduled to start at 2:45 p.m. after an earlier pitch inspection. Labuschagne and Marsh continued, with the former reaching his second half-century of the match early on, before converting it into a first century of the series. Halfway through the session, the umpires deemed the light not enough to be able to safely bowl pace and so England were required to bring Ali and Root into the attack. After reaching his 100 off the dual spin attack, Labuschagne was caught behind off Root for 111, after England reviewed the initial on-field not out decision which was overturned. England reviewed a further not out decision with the last ball before tea but the original decision was upheld. Australia entered a delayed tea at 5:00 p.m. on 214/5, trailing by 61 runs. During the tea break, the rain returned and prevented any play whatsoever during the evening session with stumps being called at 6:26 p.m. with no hope of resuming play before the 7 p.m. cut off.

==== Day five ====
With morning rain clearing there was hope for a delayed start to play. An early lunch break was taken at 12:20 p.m. with play scheduled to commence at 1 p.m., however rain during the lunch break prevented this. The rain became torrential at times throughout the afternoon preventing any play and soon after 5:20 p.m., the umpires decided to officially abandon play for the day without a ball being bowled. The match was therefore declared a draw and as a result Australia retained the Ashes.

=== Fifth Test ===
27–31 July 2023
Scorecard

England	v	Australia
283 (54.4 overs); Harry Brook 85 (91); Mitchell Starc 4/82 (14.4 overs)		295 (103.1 overs); Steve Smith 71 (123); Chris Woakes 3/61 (25 overs)
395 (81.5 overs); Joe Root 91 (106); Mitchell Starc 4/100 (20 overs)		334 (94.4 overs); Usman Khawaja 72 (145); Chris Woakes 4/50 (19 overs)

England won by 49 runs
The Oval, London
Umpires: Kumar Dharmasena (SL) and Joel Wilson (WI)
Player of the match: Chris Woakes (Eng)

- Australia won the toss and elected to field.
- No play was possible after 2:40 p.m. on Day 4 due to rain.
- No play was possible during the afternoon session on Day 5 due to rain, with tea being taken at the earlier time of 3:20 p.m.
- Stuart Broad (Eng) played in his last Test match.
- World Test Championship points: England 7, Australia 0. (Note: England were deducted five WTC points for maintaining a slow over-rate while bowling.)

==== Day one ====
England named an unchanged team from the previous Test, whilst Australia brought in spinner Todd Murphy, who was dropped for the Old Trafford Test, to replace Cameron Green. Pat Cummins won his first toss of the series and opted to bowl first in overcast conditions.

England's openers started positively, raising a fifty partnership after 10 overs, with Ben Duckett making a run-a-ball 41 before he gloved one behind off Mitchell Marsh. This wicket was the first of three to go down for just 11 runs with Zak Crawley (22) and Joe Root (5) being dismissed by Pat Cummins and Josh Hazlewood, respectively. Harry Brook and Moeen Ali put together a fifty partnership of their own to steer the innings to lunch with England on 131/3.

After lunch, Brook brought up his fourth half-century of the series off just 44 balls. Moeen hit two sixes before missing one from Murphy to be bowled for 34. England captain Ben Stokes came and went, falling for just 3 off 16, again bowled, this time by Mitchell Starc. Jonny Bairstow was also bowled, scoring 4 off 14, by Hazlewood. Three balls later, Brook finally fell for 85, edging to Steve Smith off Starc. Chris Woakes and Mark Wood saw England to tea, bringing up England's 250 with the last ball before, on 250/7.

Almost immediately after resumption, Woakes was given out lbw but reviewed the decision, getting it overturned after DRS found an edge off the bat. Two balls later, Woakes was dropped at gully by Marsh, one of five dropped catches throughout the day by Australia. The following over, spinner Murphy dismissed Wood for 28. Another over later and Stuart Broad also returned to the pavilion, caught for 7 at cover by Travis Head off Starc. After hitting a six and then a four, Woakes became the last batter to fall, caught at fine leg for Starc's fourth wicket, making a run-a-ball 36. England's innings came to an end all out for 283.

In Australia's reply, Broad had an appeal for lbw against Usman Khawaja turned down off the very first ball. As usual, Broad and James Anderson opened the bowling for England, but it was Woakes who made the breakthrough in the 17th over, David Warner caught in the cordon by Crawley for 24. Khawaja and Marnus Labuschagne saw Australia through to stumps, unbeaten on 26 and 2, respectively, at 61/1.

==== Day two ====
Australia began the morning at a slow rate, scoring just 21 runs in the first hour of the session up to the drinks break. Four overs after drinks, Wood had Labuschagne caught brilliantly at first slip by Root for 9 off 82 balls, a strike rate of 10.97. It was the only wicket to fall in the morning as Australia reached lunch on 115/2.

The afternoon session heralded much more action as Australia lost five further wickets before tea. Five balls after lunch, Broad trapped Khawaja lbw three runs short of a half-century. Two overs later and new batter Head had to depart for 4, caught behind again off Broad. In the 61st over, Anderson took his first wicket of the match with Mitchell Marsh chopping onto his stumps for 16. Wicketkeeper Carey was dismissed for 10 by Root, one ball after slog-sweeping him for six, with Stokes taking his 100th Test catch. Starc was the final wicket to fall in the eventful session before tea, attempting a pull shot off Wood but top-edging to Duckett for 7. Australia were 186/7 at tea, still 97 runs behind.

Three overs into the evening session, England thought they had Smith run out. Attempting to run two, substitute fielder George Ealham got his throw into Bairstow before Smith could make his ground. However, closer inspection by the third umpire revealed that Bairstow had dislodged one side of the bails from its groove before the ball had settled in his gloves, meaning that Smith had actually made his ground before Bairstow completed the full dislodgement of the bail. Australia survived another close call later as Cummins was given out lbw off Broad but reviewed successfully after DRS had the ball sliding down the leg side and missing the stumps. Cummins and Smith put together a crucial fifty partnership for Australia before Smith top-edged to Bairstow off Woakes for 71 on the stroke of the drinks break. Number 10 batter Murphy came in and counter-punched, hitting two fours and three sixes on his way to making 34 off 39 before Woakes trapped him lbw. Cummins was the last to fall in the last over of the day, caught on the boundary by Stokes for 36. Australia's innings ended on 295, a first innings lead of 12.

==== Day three ====
Crawley again struck the first ball of the innings for four, with Duckett also hitting the final two balls of the first over for four, putting England into the lead off the first six deliveries of the innings. The two openers put on a fifty partnership in just 8.4 overs. Starc prized the wicket of Duckett for 42 to break the opening partnership in the 17th over. Originally given not out by the on-field umpire, Australia reviewed and DRS revealed an edge. Four overs later, Crawley brought up another half-century off 61 balls. England's aggressive batting took them to lunch on 130/1 off 25 overs, a run rate of 5.20.

Crawley nicked to slip off Cummins for 73 in the second over after lunch, after which Stokes and Root continued to build a lead for England, bringing up their fifty partnership on the stroke of the drinks break. After drinks, Root brought up his half-century, followed by Stokes holing out to mid-on for 42 off spinner Murphy. New batter Brook fell an over later, after hitting a six, caught behind for 7 off Hazlewood. Root and Bairstow saw England reach tea on 265/4, a lead of 253.

Three overs into the evening session, Root and Bairstow brought up yet another fifty partnership in England's batting innings. Later Bairstow brought up his own half-century with a cover drive off Hazlewood. The two batters took England's lead beyond 300, before the partnership was finally broken with a delivery from Murphy that kept very low and caught Root's inside edge, bowling him for 91. Starc then got Bairstow caught behind for 78, and two overs later Woakes followed suit by driving straight to mid-off for 1 off Starc once more. England lost their eighth and ninth wickets in the space of three deliveries, Ali (29) attempting to ramp Starc but only holing out to Hazlewood at fine leg, and Wood (9) slogging straight to Marsh at deep midwicket off Murphy. Anderson and Broad saw England to stumps on 389/9, leading by 377 runs.

In a post-match interview almost immediately after the close of play, England bowler Stuart Broad announced his retirement from all cricket upon the completion of this Test.

==== Day four ====
With Broad having announced his retirement from cricket after this match, Australia welcomed Broad to the field with a guard of honour. Resuming on 389/9, England only lasted 11 balls with the addition of six runs, those runs being a six off the bat of Broad with his last ever delivery faced in Test cricket. Anderson the batter out for 8, trapped lbw by Murphy. England finished on 395, setting Australia a target of 384 runs to win the Test. Australia's openers eased into their chase, bringing up their fifty partnership inside 14 overs. Australia reached lunch without losing a wicket on 75/0, still requiring 309 runs.

After lunch, Khawaja and Warner brought up their first century partnership of the series in the 33rd over, and Khawaja brought up his own half-century the very next ball with an edge between slip and gully. Two overs later Warner reached his half-century with a pull to square leg for two. In the 37th over, a Wood bouncer hit Khawaja on the helmet and the ball was replaced with what was described as "an old, reverse (swinging) ball to a brand-new ball" from the box of replacement balls for the match. During the drinks break at 2:40 p.m., rain stopped play and set in for the rest of day, with play being abandoned at 4:47 p.m. with Australia on 135/0, 249 away from their target of 384.

==== Day five ====
Play on the final day of the series was delayed by 10 minutes due to a brief rain shower. Woakes made an early breakthrough for England, having Warner caught behind for 60 in fourth over of the morning. Just two overs later and Woakes prised the second opener out, trapping Khawaja lbw for 72. Labuschagne edged Wood to second slip for 13 at the end of the 49th over, before Smith and Head rebuilt the Australian innings, bringing up 200 and a fifty partnership. On the stroke of a delayed lunch break, England thought they had Smith out. Appealing for a catch by Stokes off Ali and given not out, England reviewed the decision which revealed the ball brushed Smith's gloves on the way through, but that Stokes had dropped the ball before completing the catch. The on-field decision was therefore upheld. Australia took lunch at 1:30 p.m. on 238/3, requiring 146 runs to seal the series.

The afternoon session was moments away from resuming, with the players out in the middle and ready to start, before rain prevented a ball from being bowled. The afternoon session was washed out and an early tea was taken at 3:20 p.m. to ensure maximum play in the evening session.

The evening and final session of the series resumed at 4:20 p.m. after an earlier inspection, with Head and Smith continuing their partnership for a further seven overs. In the eighth over of the session, Ali had Head edging to Root at slip for 43. Smith (54) followed in the next over, again edging to slip, this time off Woakes, after making his half-century in the previous over. One over later and Ali picked up another wicket, this time inducing an inside edge off Marsh, acrobatically caught behind by Bairstow for just 6. An Australian batting collapse of four wickets for 11 runs was complete in the following over as Woakes dismissed Starc second ball for 0, his fourth and final wicket of the innings. Cummins and Carey briefly stemmed the loss of wickets, and brought the target to below 100. However, Cummins attempted to pull Ali but deflected onto his pad and looped up a catch for Stokes at leg slip, falling for 9, leaving Australia requiring 90 runs and England two wickets, to win the Test. Carey continued to anchor the innings along with Murphy, both batters hitting boundaries to reduce the target to 55, before Murphy edged to Bairstow off Broad for 18. Broad then took the final wicket of Carey, with his final delivery in Test cricket, again caught behind for 28, to bowl Australia out for 334, secure a 49-run win and a 2–2 series draw.

== Statistics ==
=== Leading run-scorers ===
Rank	Name	Runs	Inns.	NO	HS	Ave.	100s	50s	SR
1	(Australia) Usman Khawaja	496	10	0	141	49.60	1	3	39.27
2	(England) Zak Crawley	480	9	0	189	53.33	1	2	88.72
3	(England) Joe Root	412	9	1	118*	51.50	1	2	74.77
4	(England) Ben Stokes	405	9	0	155	45.00	1	2	64.69
5	(Australia) Steve Smith	373	10	0	110	37.30	1	2	56.09
Source: ESPNcricinfo

=== Leading wicket-takers ===
Rank	Name	Wkts.	Ovs.	Mdns.	Runs	Eco.	Ave.	Best.
1	(Australia) Mitchell Starc	23	128.1	8	623	4.86	27.08	8/182
2	(England) Stuart Broad	22	184.2	33	625	3.39	28.40	6/132
3	(England) Chris Woakes	19	113.2	22	345	3.04	18.14	7/111
4	(Australia) Pat Cummins	18	158.4	8	679	4.27	37.72	7/168
5	(Australia) Josh Hazlewood	16	111.0	5	507	4.56	31.68	5/126
Source: ESPNcricinfo
