= Totoa Auvaa =

Samoan rugby union player (born 2005)

- Born: 5 June 2005 (age 21)
- Height: 195 cm (6 ft 5 in)
- Weight: 125 kg (19 st 10 lb; 276 lb)

Rugby union career
- Position: Lock
- Current team: Bristol Bears
Senior career
Years	Team	Apps	(Points)
2025–2026	Saracens		
2025–2026	→ Ampthill (loan)		
2026–	Bristol Bears		
International career
Years	Team	Apps	(Points)
2025	Samoa U20		
2025	Samoa A		

Totoa Auvaa (born 6 June 2005) is a Samoan rugby union footballer who plays for Bristol Bears. His preferred position is lock.

== Club career ==
Auvaa came to England from Samoa in August 2025, to play for PREM Rugby club Saracens, although had limited English. Auvaa spent time on loan in the RFU Championship with Ampthill RUFC during the 2025-26 season, making 17 appearances and scoring six tries, but during which time he was sent-off twice, both times against Hartpury, once for punching a member of the opposition in November 2025 in the aftermath of conceding a try for which he received a three match suspension, and in March 2026, for kicking an opponent in a ruck in retaliation to having been illegally held, for which he was suspended for five weeks, although he did not attend the disciplinary hearing due to having “very little English”, according to the hearing report, and would have found it “difficult to manage”.

Auvaa made his Saracens debut in the Premiership Rugby Cup in September 2026 against Northampton Saints. Auvaa was sacked by Saracens the following month for disciplinary reasons, after two nightclub incidents that year. The first of which took place on 8 June after a pub crawl to mark the end of Saracens' season, and involved members of the England national cricket team. During the incident, a member of England's security staff was left bloodied after being struck by Auvaa and during which he was reported to have aimed a slap at Gus Atkinson at the Rex Rooms nightclub in Chelsea. The incident led to the suspension and ultimate resignation of England cricket captain Ben Stokes. Although he faced no disciplinary action for the first incident by Saracens, with the security guard having decided against reporting the matter to the police, the second incident took place in St Albans and led to an investigation by Hertfordshire Police, although he ultimately did not ultimately face criminal charges, it led directly to his sacking.

Auvaa signed with Bristol Bears in October 2026. Director of Rugby at Bristol Bears Pat Lam, himself a former international for Samoa, said that he "always believed that young people deserve the opportunity to learn from those experiences, grow and become better people" and described Auvaa as possessing "exciting physical attributes and significant potential" while conceding that Auvaa had made "mistakes since arriving from a small village in Samoa to the massive city of London". He scored a debut-try playing at number eight in a 21-19 defeat in the Premiership Rugby Cup against Sale Sharks on 6 November 2026.

== International career ==
Auvaa captained Samoa at under-20 level, and went on to captain the Samoa A national rugby union team, and played in the Pacific Challenge, an international tournament featuring the A teams from Samoa, Tonga, Fiji and Japan.
