= Zimbabwean cricket team in Australia in 1994–95 =

The Zimbabwe national cricket team toured Australia in the 1994-95 season and played two first-class matches versus Tasmania and Queensland.

The tour consisted mainly of limited overs matches including the Benson and Hedges World Series Cup which also involved Australia and England.

Zimbabwe was captained by Andy Flower and the team included his brother Grant Flower and well-known players such as Heath Streak, Eddo Brandes, David Houghton and Paul Strang.

== External sources ==
CricketArchive
