= Pakistani cricket team in Australia in 1992–93 =

The Pakistan national cricket team toured Australia in the 1992–93 season and took part in the Benson & Hedges World Series Cup but was eliminated in the qualifying stage.

Pakistan played one first-class match on the tour against Queensland at the Brisbane Cricket Ground. Pakistan won by 5 wickets.

== External sources ==
- CricketArchive
