= Ben Stokes =

English cricketer (born 1991)

Ben Stokes OBE
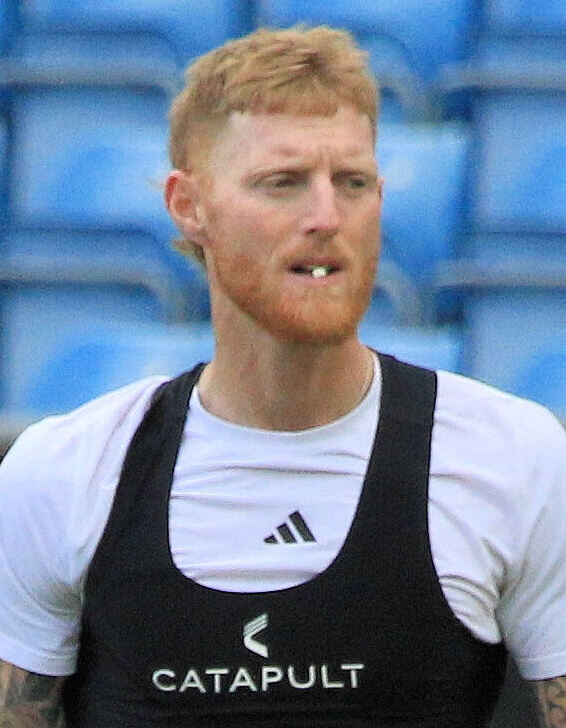
- Stokes in 2025

Personal information
- Full name: Benjamin Andrew Stokes
- Born: 4 June 1991 (age 35); Christchurch, New Zealand
- Nickname: Stokesy
- Height: 6 ft (183 cm)
- Batting: Left-handed
- Bowling: Right-arm fast-medium
- Role: All-rounder
- Relatives: Gerard Stokes (father)

International information
- National side: England (2011–2026)
- Test debut (cap 658): 5 December 2013 v Australia
- Last Test: 25 June 2026 v New Zealand
- ODI debut (cap 221): 25 August 2011 v Ireland
- Last ODI: 11 November 2023 v Pakistan
- ODI shirt no.: 55 (previously 59)
- T20I debut (cap 58): 23 September 2011 v West Indies
- Last T20I: 13 November 2022 v Pakistan
- T20I shirt no.: 55 (previously 59)

Domestic team information
- Years: Team
- 2009–present: Durham
- 2014/15: Melbourne Renegades
- 2017: Rising Pune Supergiant
- 2017/18: Canterbury
- 2018–2021: Rajasthan Royals
- 2021–2024: Northern Superchargers
- 2023: Chennai Super Kings
- 2026–: Adelaide Strikers

Career statistics
Competition	Test	ODI	T20I	FC
Matches	122	114	43	212
Runs scored	7,273	3,463	585	11,883
Batting average	34.46	41.22	21.66	34.64
100s/50s	14/37	5/24	0/1	23/62
Top score	258	182	52*	258
Balls bowled	14,085	3,110	612	24,013
Wickets	252	74	26	474
Bowling average	30.98	42.39	32.92	28.87
5 wickets in innings	6	1	0	11
10 wickets in match	0	0	0	1
Best bowling	6/22	5/61	3/26	7/67
Catches/stumpings	115/–	55/–	22/–	160/–
Medal record
Men's Cricket
Representing England
ICC Cricket World Cup
Winner	2019 England and Wales
ICC T20 World Cup
Winner	2022 Australia
Runner-up	2016 India
- Source: ESPNcricinfo, 27 September 2026

Benjamin Andrew Stokes (born 4 June 1991) is an English former international cricketer who captained the England Test team from 2022 to 2026. Stokes played for England in all three formats and is regarded as one of England's greatest all-rounders. In domestic cricket, he represents Durham and has played in multiple Twenty20 leagues around the world. He was part of the England team that won the 2019 Cricket World Cup and the 2022 T20 World Cup.

Born in Christchurch, New Zealand, Stokes moved to England as a child. He made his ODI and T20I debuts in 2011 and his Test debut in 2013. He was part of the England team that won the 2019 Cricket World Cup, top-scoring in England's innings in the final before batting in the tied Super Over, winning the Man of the Match award. He was named the Wisden Leading Cricketer in the World in 2019, 2020 and 2022, and won the ICC Award for Best Men's Cricketer and BBC Sports Personality of the Year Award in 2019. He was appointed captain of England's Test team in April 2022. He was part of the England team that won the 2022 T20 World Cup, top-scoring in the final.

An all-rounder, Stokes is a left-handed middle-order batsman and right-arm fast bowler. He holds the Test world record for most runs in an innings at number six, scoring 258 against South Africa during England's 2015–16 tour. In the same Test, he and Jonny Bairstow set the world record for highest sixth-wicket stand in Tests, at 399. In February 2023, he set a new record for the total number of sixes hit in a Test career, surpassing the previous tally of 107 set by his coach at the time, Brendon McCullum, and reaching 138 sixes at retirement. He played his 100th test match against India on 15 February 2024. He retired from international cricket on 29 June 2026.

== Early life ==
Benjamin Andrew Stokes was born on 4 June 1991 in Christchurch, New Zealand, the son of rugby league footballer and coach Gerard Stokes. His mother has Māori heritage. In 2003, at the age of 12, Stokes relocated to England when his father was appointed head coach of Workington Town Rugby League Football Club. The family settled in the West Cumbrian town of Cockermouth, where Ben attended Cockermouth School. During this period, he developed his cricketing skills with the local Cockermouth Cricket Club, contributing to their North Lancashire & Cumbria Cricket League Premier Division title win in 2006 at just 15 years old. He left school aged 16 with just one GCSE, in physical education. His parents subsequently moved back to New Zealand to reside again in Christchurch.

== Domestic career ==
Stokes made his List A debut for Durham in 2009 at The Oval and managed to take the wicket of the highly experienced batsman Mark Ramprakash with only his third delivery in professional cricket. He played in two youth Tests against Bangladesh U19 during 2009, in which he made a half-century and took a few wickets. He then went on to play in the 2010 Under-19 World Cup, during which he scored a century against the India Under-19 team.

Stokes made his first-class debut for Durham against the Marylebone Cricket Club (MCC) during the traditional season opener, which for 2010 was taking place at the Sheikh Zayed Stadium in Abu Dhabi. During that match, he bagged a half-century and took one wicket. At the start of the 2010 County Cricket Season, he also made his Championship debut for Durham when he played in a fixture against Essex. He made his maiden first-class century against Nottinghamshire at Trent Bridge on 13 May 2010. He has also featured for Durham in the Clydesdale Bank 40-over competition. Durham's continuing problems with many players becoming injured at the start of the 2010 season meant that Stokes continued playing in all forms of the game for Durham. Having had a very successful debut season in first-class cricket, he was given a place in the England Performance Programme and travelled to Australia during the 2010–11 Ashes.

Stokes was a key member of the Durham team that won the 2013 County Championship, and was also named Man of the Match in the final of the 2014 Royal London One-Day Cup Final at Lord's, having scored 38* and taken 2 wickets in a low-scoring game against Warwickshire.

On 2 January 2015, Stokes joined the Melbourne Renegades of Australia's Big Bash League for the remainder of the season as a replacement for Jesse Ryder, who was ruled out due to an injury.

On 13 February 2017, Stokes was appointed vice-captain of England's test team, deputising under Joe Root, who was made captain the same day.

On 6 May 2022, Stokes marked his return to Durham with a record-breaking 161 from 88 balls on day two of the County Championship game against Worcestershire that included him scoring 34 runs in a single over. In said over, Stokes hit five consecutive sixes but failed to make clean contact with the final delivery of the over, getting only a one-bounce four, causing him to miss out on becoming only the third cricketer in history to score six sixes in an over of first-class cricket. However, the innings still surpassed Paul Collingwood's record for the fastest first-class century by a Durham player and the record for the most sixes hit in a County Championship innings.

Stokes was part of the Northern Superchargers squad for the first four seasons of The Hundred. He made two appearances in the inaugural 2021 season. Despite missing the entire 2022 season of the competition, he was retained by the Superchargers for the third season. He did not feature in 2023 as his workload was managed between the Ashes and World Cup. He was due to make four appearances in the 2024 season however suffered a hamstring injury when batting against the Manchester Originals. Stokes opted out of the 2025 season to manage his fitness ahead of the 2025–26 Ashes series.

Stokes joined the Adelaide Strikers in the Big Bash League for the 2026-27 season, following his retirement from international cricket earlier in the year.

=== Indian Premier League ===
In February 2017, Stokes was bought by Rising Pune Supergiant to play in the Indian Premier League during the 2017 season. He made his maiden Twenty20 century against Gujarat Lions, hitting 103 not out from 63 balls, including hitting seven fours and six sixes. He was named as the Most Valuable Player for the 2017 season. For the 2018 season, he moved to the Rajasthan Royals having been bought for £1.7 million, the most expensive player in the 2018 IPL auction.

In October 2020, he scored 107 not out for the Rajasthan Royals as part of an unbeaten partnership of 152 with Sanju Samson. During the 2021 IPL, Stokes suffered a finger injury which ruled him out from the entire season after playing in only one match. He pulled out of the 2022 edition as he wanted to focus on his country's Test team. He was bought by the Chennai Super Kings to play in the IPL 2023 season for INR. 16.25 Crore (£1.6 million) in the IPL auction held on 23 December 2022.

== International career ==
=== 2011–2012 Ireland, India and New Zealand ===
Stokes made his senior England debut in a One Day International (ODI) against Ireland in August 2011. Stokes was caught and bowled by Paul Stirling for just three runs and did not bowl; however, he did take a catch.

=== 2013–14 Ashes series ===
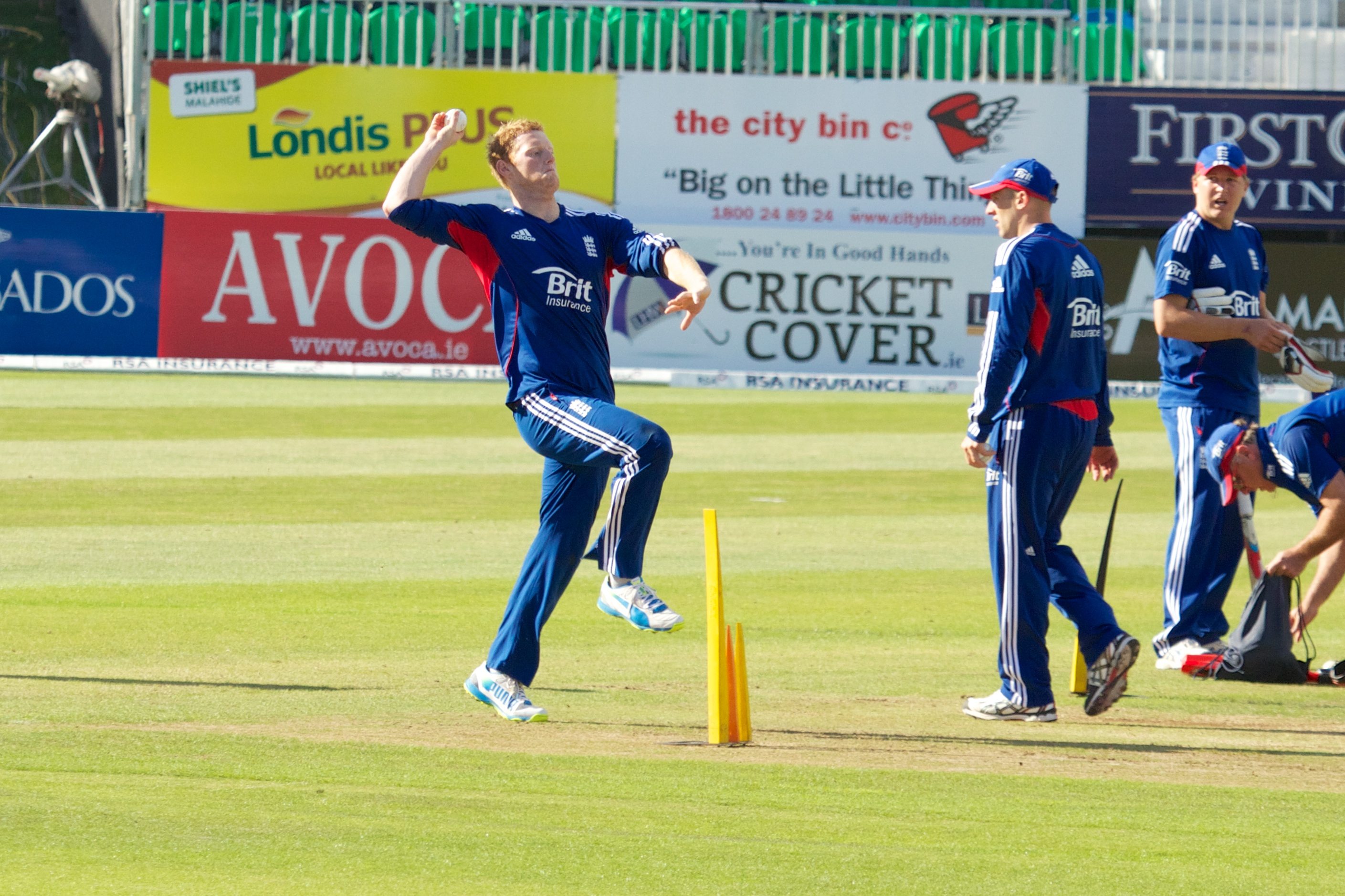
Stokes practising before England's ODI against Ireland in 2013

Stokes was selected for the England squad for the 2013–14 Ashes series against Australia. He became the 658th player to represent England at Test level. He made his debut in the 2nd Test and took the wickets of Michael Clarke and Peter Siddle before contributing 1 run in England's first innings. In the second innings, he made 28 runs off 90 balls in England's loss. He was selected in the 3rd Test and took the wicket of Brad Haddin, he then made 18 off 57 deliveries. In Australia's second innings, he bowled Michael Clarke and took Steve Smith's wicket. In England's second innings, he made his maiden Test century, scoring 120 off 195 balls before being caught. In the first innings of the 4th Test, he made 14 runs, then managed to get Shane Watson out. In the second innings, he hit 19 runs and took the wicket of David Warner in England's loss.

Stokes took a career-best 6 wickets for 99 runs in the first innings of the 5th Test, including the major wickets of captain Clarke for 10 and top-scorer for the innings Steve Smith for 115. Stokes top-scored for England with 47 runs in the first innings to help England limp to 155 all out. In the second innings he made 32 and finished the series on the losing end of a 5–0 whitewash. Stokes enjoyed a solid series, however, finishing as England's third-highest run scorer with 279 runs and also second-highest wicket taker with 15 wickets. Stokes was the only English batsman to score a hundred in the series. Stokes was praised for his batting efforts on a typical fast and bouncy WACA surface against the hostile fast bowling of Mitchell Johnson at the height of his bowling powers. The Guardian described Stokes's WACA century as "the only welcome positive for the future."

=== 2015 Ashes ===
In the one off T20I against Australia, Stokes took figures of 1–29 as England won by five runs. Stokes played in all five ODIs against Australia, his best performance with the ball coming in the second game of the series where he took figures of 3–60, although England lost the match by 59 runs. During the second ODI match of the series against Australia, Stokes was given out obstructing the field. He became only the sixth batsman to be given out in this manner in an ODI game. While Stokes never took another wicket in the series, his batting did improve. He scored 41 in the fourth ODI which England won by 3 wickets. Although England lost the final ODI to lose the series 3–2, Stokes was one of England's better performers, scoring 42 of their 138 runs.

=== 2015 Pakistan ===
Stokes was named in the England test squad for the tour against Pakistan hosted in the UAE. In the first test in Abu Dhabi, he took 4–57 with the ball in Pakistan's first innings before himself scoring 57 with the bat in England's first innings; the match ultimately ended in a draw when bad light stopped play on the final day. In the second match of the series Stokes was ineffective, taking just one wicket in the match and making scores of 4 and 13 with the bat as England suffered a 127-run defeat. He suffered a shoulder injury in the third and final test in Sharjah, but still batted at number 11 as England ultimately lost the match and with it the series.

=== 2015–16 South Africa ===
Stokes returned to full fitness to take his place in England's winter tour of South Africa. While Stokes did not make a stand out contribution in the first test, England won by 241 runs. In England's first innings of the second test in Cape Town, Stokes arrived at the crease with England 167–4, facing a hat-trick ball from Kagiso Rabada. Stokes then hit a career-best score of 258, which included 30 fours and 11 sixes. It was the second fastest double century in the history of test cricket (from 167 balls). His sixth wicket stand with Jonny Bairstow (who himself scored 150 not out) of 399 was a new world record, of which 196 were scored in 25 overs in the morning session on Day 2 alone. Stokes' innings was ended in bizarre fashion, when after hitting two successive sixes, he was dropped by AB de Villiers only to be run out having paused between the wickets. The match finished in a draw with the batsmen dominating the game. In the third Test Stokes took five wickets as England won, securing a series victory for England. The fourth and final match of the series was won by South Africa, although Stokes did take another five wickets, including 4–86 in South Africa's first innings.

In the first Test against India, Stokes made 128 in England's first innings to help them reach 537. He took one wicket in India's first innings, before making an unbeaten 29. The match ended in a draw. In the second Test he finished with figures of 1–73 in India's first innings, before making 70 with the bat. He was out for six in England's second innings as they lost by 246 runs. In the third Test he made 29 in England's first innings, and then took 5–73 in India's first innings. After making five in the second innings, Stokes failed to pick up another wicket as England suffered another defeat. In the fourth Test he made 31 in England's first innings score of 400, but failed to pick up a wicket or make an impression in England's second innings as they lost by an innings and 36 runs. In the final match of the series, Stokes picked up just one wicket and scored 29 runs in the match as England lost by an innings and 75 runs. For his performances in 2016, he was named in the World Test XI by the ICC and ESPNcricinfo. He was also named in the ODI XI of the year 2016 by ESPNcricinfo.

=== 2017 South Africa, Champions Trophy and West Indies ===
Stokes scored his second ODI century against South Africa in the lead-up to the Champions Trophy, and in the tournament itself his third, against Australia. He was also named as part of the 'Team of the Tournament' at the 2017 Champions Trophy by the ICC.

Stokes scored 299 runs, including a century at The Oval, and took 7 wickets in a four Test series against South Africa. In a three Test series against West Indies, he scored 228 runs and took 9 wickets. At Headingley, in the second Test, he scored his fourth Test century, and at Lord's in the third, he took a career best 6–22 with the ball.

=== 2019 Cricket World Cup ===
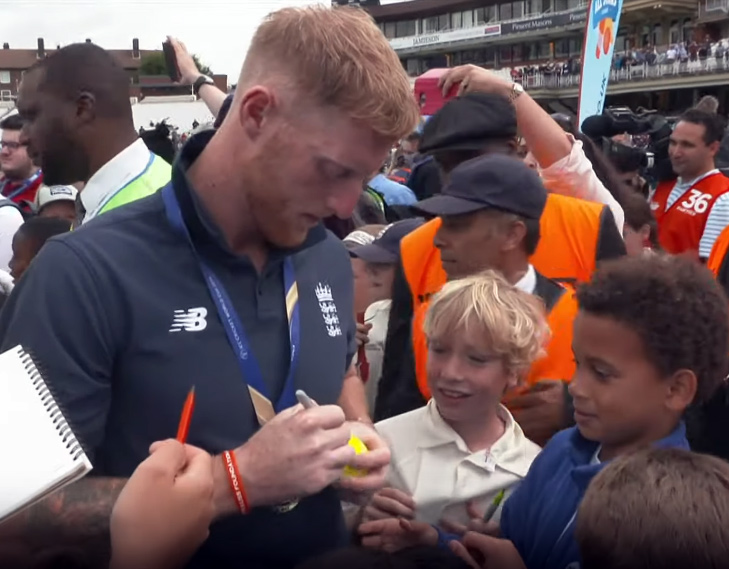
Ben Stokes signing an autograph for a fan, after the World cup victory

In April 2019, Stokes was named in England's squad for the 2019 Cricket World Cup.

In the opening match of the tournament against South Africa, he made a score of 89 runs from 79 balls, claimed two wickets, ran out Dwaine Pretorius and took two catches to be declared "Man of the Match" in a comprehensive 104-run win for England. His catch to dismiss Andile Phehlukwayo has been described as "one of the greatest catches of all time".

Stokes produced multiple standout performances with the bat later in the group stage. Stokes was left stranded on 82*, as England were bowled out for 212 in a surprise 20-run defeat to Sri Lanka. He again proved to be the only resistance to Australia's bowling attack in their following match, by scoring 89 runs in a chase of 286. England ultimately fell short by 64 runs as they were bowled out for 221. In a must-win match against India in the following group match, Stokes played a very important innings, scoring a quick-fire 79 runs in 54 balls, as England won by 31 runs.

In the final against New Zealand, he scored 84*, including 2 sixes in the final over (one traditional and one due to overthrows after a ball bounced off Stokes' bat to the boundary), to tie the game. He then batted in the super over with Jos Buttler, which again was a tie, but England won the match on the boundary countback rule then in place. For this performance, he was named man of the match for the second time in the tournament.

He was named in the "Team of the Tournament" for the 2019 World Cup by the ICC.

=== 2019 Ashes ===
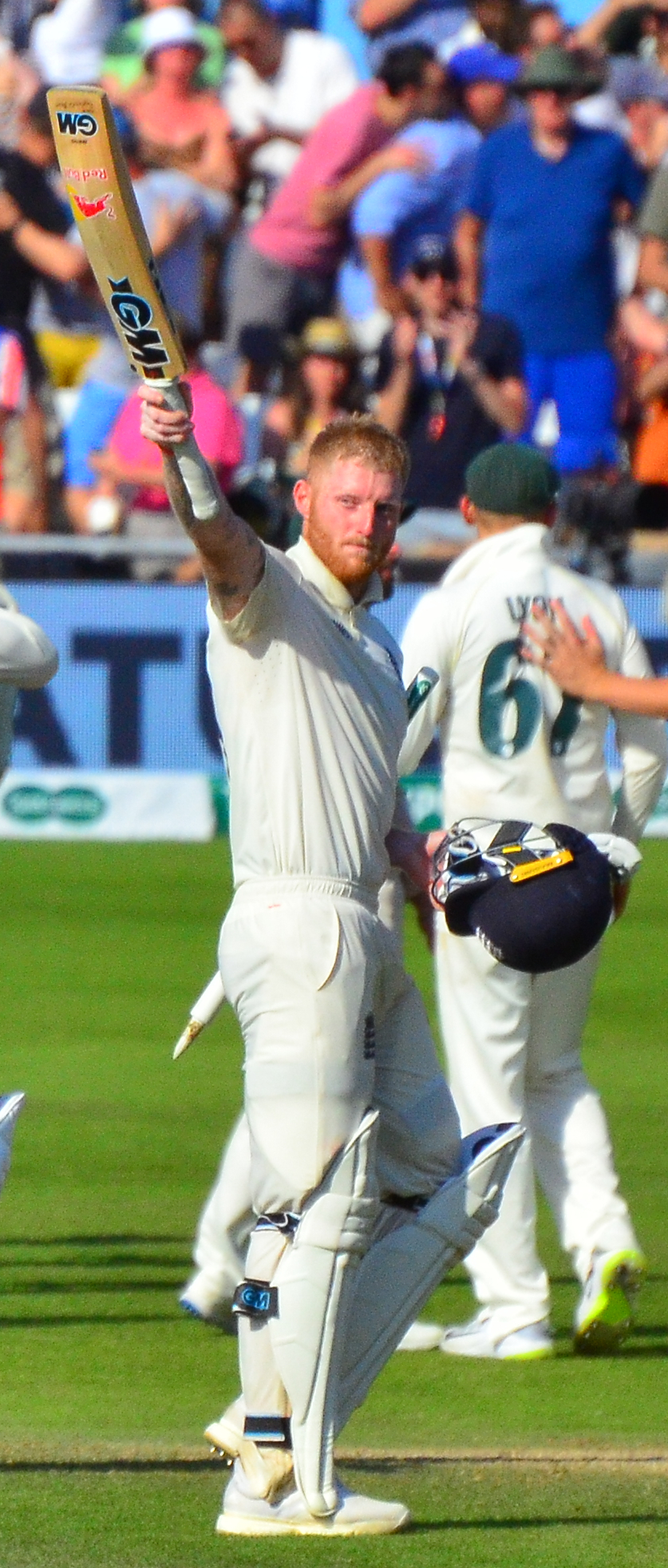
Stokes raising his bat after winning the third Test against Australia

Faced with an incisive Australian bowling attack and Bradmanesque batting contribution from Steve Smith, Stokes played a pivotal role in enabling England ultimately to draw the 2019 Ashes series 2–2 (although Australia thereby retained the urn). In the third test at Headingley, England appeared to be heading for certain defeat after they were bowled out for 67 in their first innings. Stokes managed to overturn an overnight Australian lead, hitting 11 fours and 8 sixes to win with an unbeaten 135* in a record pursuit of 359. His innings has been described as "one of the greatest innings of all time" and the "greatest ever played by an Englishman". Stokes's innings was rated by Wisden as the Greatest hundred of the decade (2010s).

He was named as England's player of the series as he ended the series as England's top run-scorer with 441 runs with 2 hundreds and 2 fifties, while also taking 8 wickets.

"It's the same with success and failure. There's always the momentum thing, but you just have to put whatever happened in the past behind you."

=== 2019 New Zealand ===
Stokes continued on his good form into the tour of New Zealand. He made scores of 91 and 28 as England slumped to an innings defeat in the first test match of the series. He then made 26 runs in his only innings in the next test, as England drew the match to lose the series.

He was named as the 2019 BBC Sports Personality of the Year, ICC Player of the Year at the 2019 ICC Awards.

=== 2019–20 South Africa ===
Stokes' form continued into 4-test match tour of South Africa, as he was named player of the series after scoring 318 runs and taking 10 wickets. Following defeat in the first test, Stokes put in a "man of the match" performance in the 2nd test. He made scores of 47 and 72, with the latter from only 47 balls, to set South Africa a target of 437. Stokes then managed to break the host's resistance, as they fought to draw the game, by taking the final 3 wickets to bowl them out for 248 runs to level the series. In the following match, his first innings score of 120 was crucial in setting up an innings win for England, which meant they took a 2–1 lead in the series going into the final test match. Stokes only made 2 and 28 runs in the final test, but he did take 4 wickets in the match, as England won by 191 runs to secure a second consecutive away series win against South Africa.

=== 2020 West Indies ===
On 17 June 2020, Stokes was included in England's 30-man squad to start training behind closed doors for the Test series against the West Indies. Stokes was named as captain for one of the teams in the official inter-squad warm-up match. In the absence of regular captain Joe Root (due to the birth of his child), it was announced that as vice-captain, Stokes would therefore captain England for the first time. Prior to being named captain, Stokes had never led a team in a first-class, List A or Twenty20 cricket match. In the first Test, Stokes took his 150th wicket, to become the sixth cricketer to score 4,000 runs and take 150 wickets in Tests, and in the first innings of the second Test, Stokes scored 176 runs, to record his tenth century in Test cricket.

=== 2021 Stand-in captain, break, and the Ashes ===
During the 2021 season, the England limited-over squad suffered a COVID outbreak at the end of a limited overs series against Sri Lanka. The whole squad, including the captain Eoin Morgan, had to self-isolate just before a home series against Pakistan. Stokes had not played against Sri Lanka due to injury, leaving him as the most senior player for the Pakistan ODI matches, for which he was named captain. He led the inexperienced team, in which he had almost four times as many ODI appearances as the rest of the team combined, to a nine-wicket victory in the first match. In the next game of the series against Pakistan, Stokes played in his 100th ODI match.

On 30 July 2021, it was announced that Stokes would take an "indefinite break" from cricket. In October 2021, Stokes was added to England's squad for the 2021–22 Ashes series in Australia.

=== 2022: Test captaincy and T20 World Cup ===
On 28 April 2022, Stokes was named as England men's Test captain after Joe Root's resignation. With new coach Brendon McCullum, Stokes developed a new style of play which would come to be known as Bazball, noted for its fearless and entertaining nature.

In June 2022, Stokes started his captaincy with the 3–0 clean sweep of New Zealand cricket team in England in 2022. He scored 194 runs in 5 innings at an average of 48.50

In July 2022, England defeated the South African team 2–1 in Test series, Stokes named Player of the Series, he scored 149 runs in 4 innings at an average of 37.25 and picked up 10 wickets at a bowling average of 15.70

==== ODI retirement and return ====
On 18 July 2022, Stokes announced that he would retire from ODI cricket following the first match of the series against South Africa, citing the physical and mental demands of playing all three formats. On 16 August 2023, it was announced Stokes would come out of ODI retirement and was named part of England's squad for the 2023 Cricket World Cup.

==== 2022 T20 World Cup ====
In 2022 ICC Men's T20 World Cup Final, Stokes scored an unbeaten 52* runs which helped England to win the World Cup by defeating Pakistan.

==== 2022 Pakistan ====
Following the 2022 Pakistan floods, Stokes confirmed that he would donate his match fees from the Pakistan test series to the flood appeal. Stokes added that "hopefully this donation can go towards the rebuilding of areas of Pakistan most affected by the flooding".

==== 2023 Cricket World Cup ====
Stokes came out of ODI retirement to play in the 2023 Cricket World Cup. He failed to make an impact in the initial games, before scoring a century against Netherlands. He scored 108 runs off 84 balls to win the Man of the Match award.

=== 2024: Record-breaking Test 50 ===
Opening the batting in the second innings of the 3rd Test against the West Indies at Edgbaston on 28 July 2024, Stokes scored the fastest Test half-century by an English player. He reached his 50 off just 24 balls, surpassing Ian Botham's record set in 1981 by four deliveries, and finished on 57 not out having hit nine fours and two sixes. Stokes missed the subsequent Test series with Sri Lanka after sustaining a hamstring tear during The Hundred.

In October 2024, Stokes committed to a new two-year central contract with the England and Wales Cricket Board (ECB), extending his tenure until the autumn of 2026.

=== 2025: Injury and Recovery ===
In December 2024, during the third Test against New Zealand in Hamilton, Stokes suffered a torn left hamstring. Subsequent assessments confirmed the severity of the injury, necessitating surgery in January 2025. As a result, Stokes was ruled out of all cricketing activities for at least three months, missing the SA20 and Champions Trophy. He returned to cricket in May 2025 for England's home Test with Zimbabwe. Stokes featured in the first four Tests of the series with India, taking 17 wickets and winning two man of the match awards. In the fourth Test at Old Trafford, he scored his first century in two years but sustained a torn shoulder muscle resulting in his omission from the final Test.

=== 2026: Retirement ===
On 28 June 2026, Stokes announced his retirement from international cricket, effective following the end of the then-ongoing third Test between England and New Zealand at Trent Bridge. In his last Test match, Stokes returned bowling figures of 4/70 and 2/49 and scored 15 off 33 balls in the first innings and 30 off 20 balls as an opener in the second innings.

== International centuries ==
=== Test centuries ===
Test centuries scored by Ben Stokes
No.	Score	Against	Venue	H/A/N	Date	Result
1	120	Australia	(Australia) WACA, Perth	Away	13 December 2013	Lost
2	101	New Zealand	(England) Lord's, London	Home	21 May 2015	Won
3	258	South Africa	(South Africa) Newlands, Cape Town	Away	2 January 2016	Drawn
4	128	India	(India) Saurashtra Cricket Association Stadium, Rajkot	Away	16 September 2016	Drawn
5	112	South Africa	(England) The Oval, London	Home	27 July 2017	Won
6	100	West Indies	(England) Headingley, Leeds	Home	25 August 2017	Lost
7	115*	Australia	(England) Lord's, London	Home	14 August 2019	Drawn
8	135*	Australia	(England) Headingley, Leeds	Home	22 August 2019	Won
9	120	South Africa	(South Africa) St George's Park, Gqeberha	Away	16 January 2020	Won
10	176	West Indies	(England) Old Trafford, Manchester	Home	16 July 2020	Won
11	120	West Indies	(Barbados) Kensington Oval, Bridgetown	Away	16 March 2022	Drawn
12	103	South Africa	(England) Old Trafford, Manchester	Home	25 August 2022	Won
13	155	Australia	(England) Lord's, London	Home	28 June 2023	Lost
14	141	India	(England) Old Trafford, Manchester	Home	23 July 2025	Drawn

=== One Day International centuries ===
ODI centuries scored by Ben Stokes
No.	Score	Against	Venue	H/A/N	Date	Result
1	101	Bangladesh	(Bangladesh) Sher-e-Bangla National Cricket Stadium, Dhaka	Away	7 October 2016	Won
2	101	South Africa	(England) Rose Bowl, Southampton	Home	27 May 2017	Won
3	102	Australia	(England) Edgbaston, Birmingham	Home	10 June 2017	Won
4	182	New Zealand	(England) The Oval, London	Home	13 September 2023	Won
5	108	Netherlands	(India) MCA Stadium, Pune	Neutral	8 November 2023	Won

== Personal life ==
Stokes became engaged to Clare Ratcliffe in 2013. They married in East Brent, Somerset in October 2017. They have two children. Stokes has a tattoo of a family of lions, symbolising his own family, covering his entire back, which took 28 hours to complete. Stokes has Maori Ngāpuhi heritage, which is also shown in one of his tattoos. Stokes and his mother received damages in 2021 from The Sun, who in 2019 had run a front-page story about a family tragedy which was argued not to be in the public interest. In May 2025, it was reported that Stokes had quit alcohol having reportedly been abstinent since 2 January.

=== 2017 Nightclub incident and affray charge ===
Following the third ODI against West Indies at Bristol in September 2017, Stokes was arrested after becoming involved in a street brawl near a nightclub with two men, at which teammate Alex Hales was also present. Stokes gave Ryan Hale, a former soldier, a 1.5-inch superficial laceration and bruising to his forehead and left him with concussion. Ryan Ali, an emergency services worker, suffered a fracture to the left of his face, a swollen left eye and a laceration above his eyebrow. He also had a cracked lower left molar. This incident led to both players missing the fourth game of the series, and a hand injury sustained in the brawl also ruled Stokes out of the final game. He also missed the 2017–18 Ashes and the second Test match against India due to the incident and the subsequent trial. He lost his apparel sponsorship with New Balance over these incidents.

Stokes was charged on 15 January 2018 with affray along with the two other men, and appeared before Bristol Magistrates' Court on 13 February 2018. During the trial, which started on 6 August 2018, Stokes said he was defending a gay couple from homophobic abuse from the other two men. He was acquitted on 14 August. The couple thanked Stokes afterwards for defending them, saying that he "didn't deserve being put through a trial".

In September 2018, Stokes was charged with bringing the game into disrepute by the England and Wales Cricket Board (ECB) over the incident in Bristol and social media posts. Stokes pleaded guilty to the charges, and in December 2018 was fined £30,000 and banned for eight matches, an exclusion which he had already served by that time.

=== Mental health ===
Stokes has been open about the mental health issues he has faced during his career. In June 2021 Stokes announced an indefinite break from cricket to focus on his 'mental wellbeing'. He later stated that the combination of feeling let down over the ECB's handling of the Bristol nightclub incident, the impact of the COVID-19 pandemic, and the death of his father Ged Stokes in December 2020 due to brain cancer had led him to suffer from anxiety and panic attacks. As of August 2022 Stokes said he was still speaking to his therapist, and continuing to take anti-anxiety medication.

I find sometimes people are a bit nervous to go into the detail about that kind of stuff with me. It's perceived you can't feel a certain way – that's a sign of weakness to show that you are not mentally feeling great. People think they can't ask people who have struggled. No. It's fine. I'll happily tell you as much as I possibly can.

— Ben Stokes, The Telegraph

Consequently, part of the ethos of the Bazball style under Stokes has been an increased focus on mental wellbeing and conditioning of the players.

== Records and achievements ==
- Man of the Match in the final of the 2019 Cricket World Cup.
- Second-fastest Test double hundred in terms of balls faced.
- Fastest 250 in Tests for which he took only 196 balls.
- Second highest number of sixes in a Test innings – 11 sixes
- Highest number of sixes in a Test career
- Most runs in a Test innings at the sixth position – 258 runs
- Most runs in the first session of a day in Tests – 130 runs
- Highest Test partnership for the sixth wicket. He achieved this feat against South Africa when he made a partnership of 399 runs with Jonny Bairstow.
- Became the second cricketer after Ian Botham to have over 4,000 runs and over 100 wickets in Tests for England.
- Highest number of sixes in a County Championship innings – 17 (for Durham against Worcestershire in May 2022)
- Most runs in an ODI innings for England – 182 runs

== Honours ==
England

- ICC Cricket World Cup – 2019
- ICC T20 World Cup – 2022

Individual

- He was awarded the Freedom of the Borough of Allerdale on 25 September 2019.
- He was awarded the 2019 BBC Sports Personality of the Year in Aberdeen.
- Stokes was appointed Officer of the Order of the British Empire (OBE) in the 2020 New Year Honours for services to cricket.
- 2019 – ICC Cricketer of the Year.
- 2022 – ICC Test Cricketer of the Year.
- He was named as the Wisden Leading Cricketer in the World in the 2019, 2020 and 2022 editions of the Almanack.
- Named as the Indian Premier League's Player of the tournament for the 2017 season.
