= 2018 Sunrisers Hyderabad season =

Indian Premier League cricket team season

Sunrisers Hyderabad
2018 season
- Coach: Tom Moody
- Captain: Kane Williamson
- Ground(s): Rajiv Gandhi International Cricket Stadium, Hyderabad
- IPL: Runners-up
- Most runs: Kane Williamson (735)
- Most wickets: Rashid Khan (21); Siddarth Kaul (21)
- Most catches: Shikhar Dhawan (12)
- Most wicket-keeping dismissals: Wriddhiman Saha (6)

Sunrisers Hyderabad (SRH) are a franchise cricket team based in Hyderabad, Telangana, India, which plays in the Indian Premier League (IPL). They were one of the eight teams that competed in the 2018 Indian Premier League, making their sixth appearance in all IPL tournaments. The team was captained by Kane Williamson and coached by Tom Moody with Simon Helmot as assistant coach, Muttiah Muralitharan as bowling coach and V. V. S. Laxman as mentor.

They began their season by winning their opening fixture on 9 April, and went on to become the first team to qualify for the play-offs on 10 May. They beat the Kolkata Knight Riders in Qualifier 2 to reach the Final where they lost to the Chennai Super Kings by eight wickets to finish the season as runners-up. Williamson won the Orange Cap for scoring 735 runs in the IPL season.

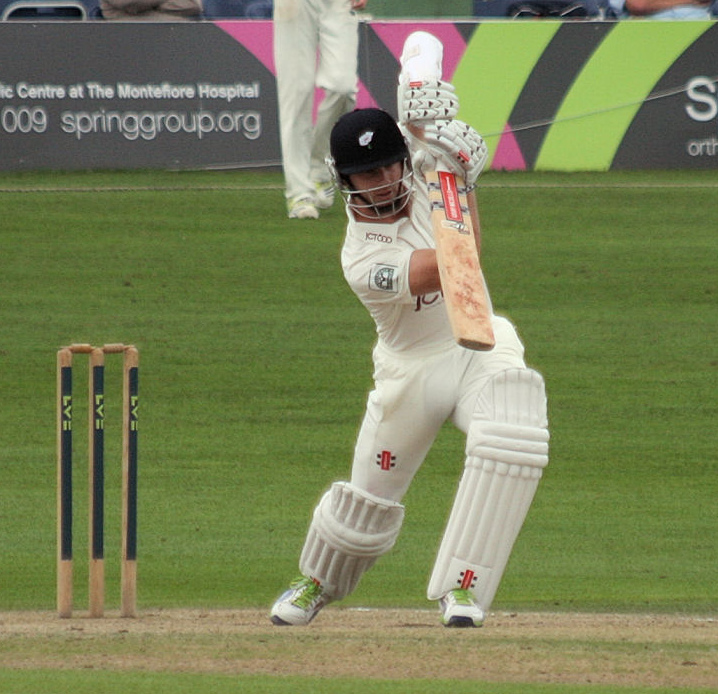
Kane Williamson was appointed as the captain of Sunrisers for 2018 IPL

== Background ==
The Chennai Super Kings and the Rajasthan Royals were re-included in the 2018 season after serving two years of suspension from the competition due to the involvement of their owners in the 2013 IPL betting scandal. The IPL Governing Council also announced that a maximum of five players can be retained by each IPL team of which no more than three can be selected through retention in the lead up to the auction, and a maximum of three through right-to-match (RTM) cards during the auction. The other restrictions on player retention were: a maximum of three capped Indian players can be retained, and only two overseas and two uncapped Indian players can be retained - kept to avoid repetition. The salary cap for each team for the 2018 season had been increased from ₹660 million (US$6.9 million) to ₹800 million (US$8.3 million). A franchise was allowed to spend a total of only ₹330 million (US$3.4 million) on retention ahead of the 2018 IPL auction, leaving it at least ₹470 million (US$4.9 million) to spend at the auction.

== Player acquisition ==
=== Retention ===
The Sunrisers Hyderabad announced their retention list on 4 January 2018 retaining David Warner and Bhuvneshwar Kumar. They went into the 2018 IPL auction with the remaining salary cap of ₹590 million (US$6.1 million) and three right-to-match cards.

=== Player auction ===
The Sunrisers Hyderabad started the auction by using their first RTM card for Shikhar Dhawan. They acquired Shakib Al Hasan and welcomed back Kane Williamson from marquee list in auction. They bid heavily on Manish Pandey and got him for ₹110 million (US$1.1 million) which made him the joint-most expensive buy of the day for an Indian player. They later added Carlos Brathwaite and Yusuf Pathan from the capped all-rounders list and also got Wriddhiman Saha as their first-choice wicket-keeper. They used their remaining two RTM cards to retain Rashid Khan and Deepak Hooda. They later added Ricky Bhui to their batting line-up. They participated actively during the auction of uncapped fast-bowlers retaining Siddarth Kaul and also getting the services of Thangarasu Natarajan, Basil Thampi and Khaleel Ahmed. This ended the first day of auction for the Sunrisers with the addition of 14 players to their squad spending ₹510.5 million (US$5.3 million).

On the second day, the Sunrisers got Mohammad Nabi back into their squad and later added Sandeep Sharma, possibly to form an opening bowling partnership with Bhuvneshwar Kumar. They also added Sachin Baby, Billy Stanlake and Shreevats Goswami, before retaining Chris Jordan and Tanmay Agarwal to add depth to their squad in the accelerated process in the auction. The franchise bought Bipul Sharma and the local boy, Mehdi Hasan, in the second round of the auction to fill their maximum quota of 25 players. This ended the second day of auction for the Sunrisers Hyderabad with the addition of 9 players for ₹73 million (US$760,000).

Retained players
~~David Warner~~ and Bhuvneshwar Kumar

Released players
Tanmay Agarwal, Kane Williamson, Shikhar Dhawan, Ricky Bhui, Moises Henriques, Mohammad Nabi, Yuvraj Singh, Deepak Hooda, Bipul Sharma, Ben Cutting, Vijay Shankar, Naman Ojha, Eklavya Dwivedi, Siddarth Kaul, Mohammed Siraj, Rashid Khan, Chris Jordan, Barinder Sran, Ashish Nehra, Mustafizur Rahman, Abhimanyu Mithun, Ben Laughlin, Pravin Tambe

Added players
Shikhar Dhawan^{[RTM]}, Shakib Al Hasan, Kane Williamson, Manish Pandey, Carlos Brathwaite, Yusuf Pathan, Wriddhiman Saha, Rashid Khan^{[RTM]}, Ricky Bhui, Deepak Hooda^{[RTM]}, Siddarth Kaul, Thangarasu Natarajan, Basil Thampi, Khaleel Ahmed, Mohammad Nabi, Sandeep Sharma, Sachin Baby, Chris Jordan, Billy Stanlake, Tanmay Agarwal, Shreevats Goswami, Bipul Sharma^{[REC-1]}, Mehdi Hasan^{[REC-1]}

Replacement players
Alex Hales

== Squad ==
- Players with international caps are listed in **bold**.
- **Signed Year** denotes year from which player is continuously associated with Sunrisers Hyderabad

No.	Name	Nationality	Birth date	Batting style	Bowling style	Year signed	Salary	Notes
Batsmen
2	**Alex Hales**	England	3 January 1989 (aged 29)	Right-handed	Right-arm medium	2018	₹10 million (US$100,000)	Overseas. Replacement to Warner.
10	**Manish Pandey**	India	10 September 1989 (aged 28)	Right-handed	Right-arm off break	2018	₹110 million (US$1.1 million)	
11	Tanmay Agarwal	India	3 May 1995 (aged 22)	Left-handed	Right-arm leg break	2017	₹2 million (US$21,000)	
18	Sachin Baby	India	18 December 1988 (aged 29)	Left-handed	Right-arm off break	2018	₹2 million (US$21,000)	
22	**Kane Williamson**	New Zealand	8 August 1990 (aged 27)	Right-handed	Right-arm off break	2015	₹30 million (US$310,000)	Captain, Overseas.
25	**Shikhar Dhawan**	India	5 December 1985 (aged 32)	Left-handed	Right-arm off break	2013	₹52 million (US$540,000)	
27	Ricky Bhui	India	29 November 1996 (aged 21)	Right-handed	Right-arm leg break	2014	₹2 million (US$21,000)	
31	**David Warner**	Australia	27 October 1986 (aged 31)	Left-handed	Right-arm leg break	2014	₹120 million (US$1.2 million)	Overseas. Banned from IPL 2018.
All-rounders
4	Mehdi Hasan	India	3 February 1990 (aged 28)	Left-handed	Slow left-arm orthodox	2018	₹2 million (US$21,000)	
5	Deepak Hooda	India	19 April 1995 (aged 22)	Right-handed	Right-arm off break	2016	₹36 million (US$370,000)	
7	**Mohammad Nabi**	Afghanistan	1 January 1985 (aged 33)	Right-handed	Right-arm off break	2017	₹10 million (US$100,000)	Overseas.
17	**Yusuf Pathan**	India	17 November 1982 (aged 35)	Right-handed	Right-arm off break	2018	₹19 million (US$200,000)	
26	**Carlos Brathwaite**	West Indies	18 July 1988 (aged 29)	Right-handed	Right-arm medium-fast	2018	₹20 million (US$210,000)	Overseas.
28	Bipul Sharma	India	28 September 1983 (aged 34)	Left-handed	Slow left-arm orthodox	2015	₹2 million (US$21,000)	
75	**Shakib Al Hasan**	Bangladesh	24 March 1987 (aged 31)	Left-handed	Left-arm orthodox spin	2018	₹20 million (US$210,000)	Overseas.
Wicket-keepers
3	Shreevats Goswami	India	18 May 1989 (aged 28)	Left-handed		2018	₹10 million (US$100,000)	
6	**Wriddhiman Saha**	India	24 October 1984 (aged 33)	Right-handed		2018	₹50 million (US$520,000)	
Bowlers
9	Siddarth Kaul	India	19 May 1990 (aged 27)	Right-handed	Right-arm medium-fast	2016	₹38 million (US$390,000)	
13	Khaleel Ahmed	India	5 December 1997 (aged 20)	Right-handed	Left-arm medium-fast	2018	₹30 million (US$310,000)	
15	**Bhuvneshwar Kumar**	India	5 February 1990 (aged 28)	Right-handed	Right-arm medium-fast	2014	₹85 million (US$880,000)	Vice-captain.
19	**Rashid Khan**	Afghanistan	20 September 1998 (aged 19)	Right-handed	Right-arm leg break	2017	₹90 million (US$930,000)	Overseas.
30	Basil Thampi	India	11 September 1993 (aged 24)	Right-handed	Right-arm medium-fast	2018	₹9.5 million (US$99,000)	
34	**Chris Jordan**	England	4 October 1988 (aged 29)	Right-handed	Right-arm fast-medium	2017	₹10 million (US$100,000)	Overseas.
37	**Billy Stanlake**	Australia	4 November 1994 (aged 23)	Left-handed	Right-arm medium-fast	2018	₹5 million (US$52,000)	Overseas. Ruled out due to fractured finger.
44	Thangarasu Natarajan	India	27 May 1991 (aged 26)	Left-handed	Left-arm medium-fast	2018	₹4 million (US$42,000)	
66	**Sandeep Sharma**	India	18 May 1993 (aged 24)	Right-handed	Right-arm medium-fast	2018	₹30 million (US$310,000)	

== Administration and support staff ==
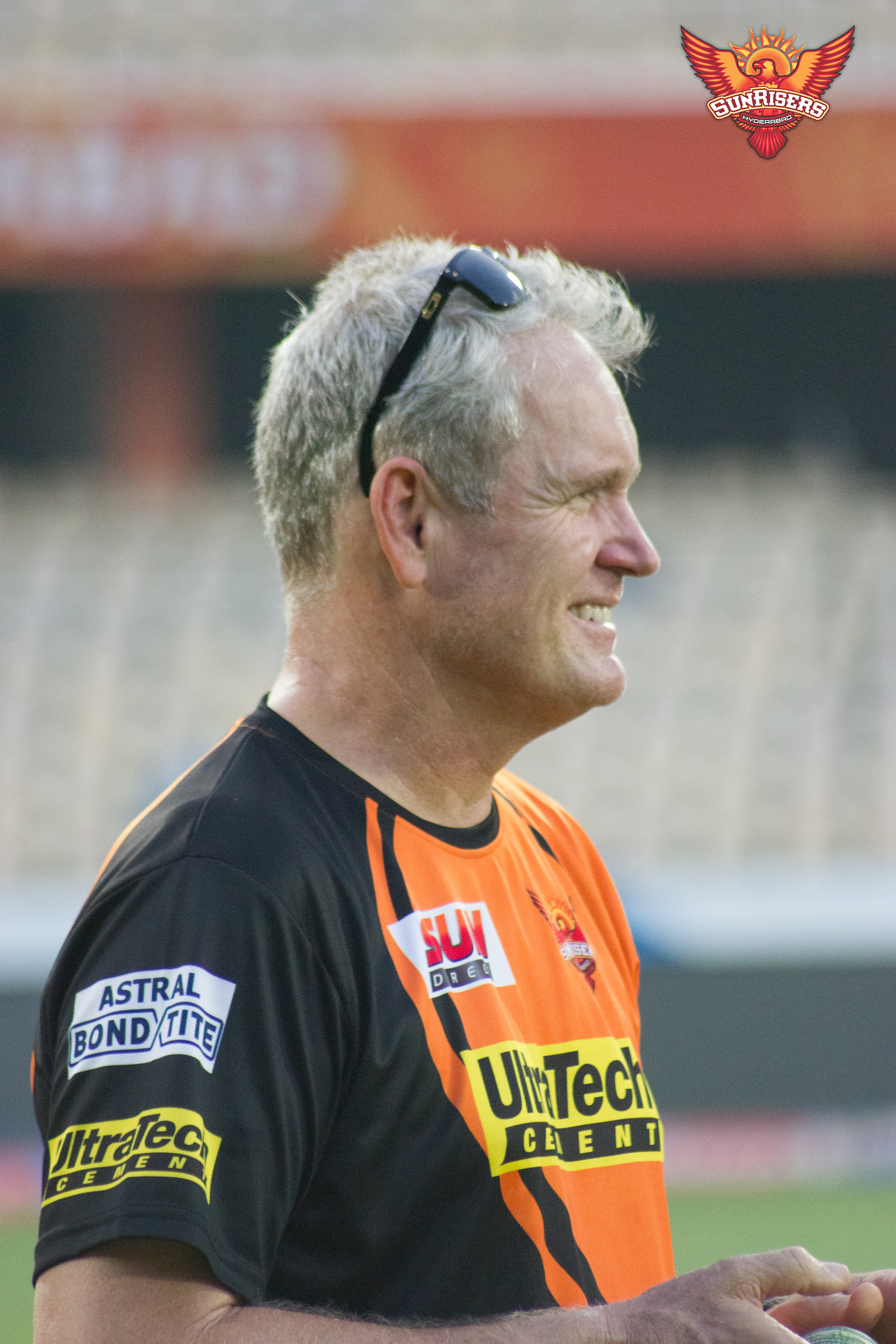
Tom Moody

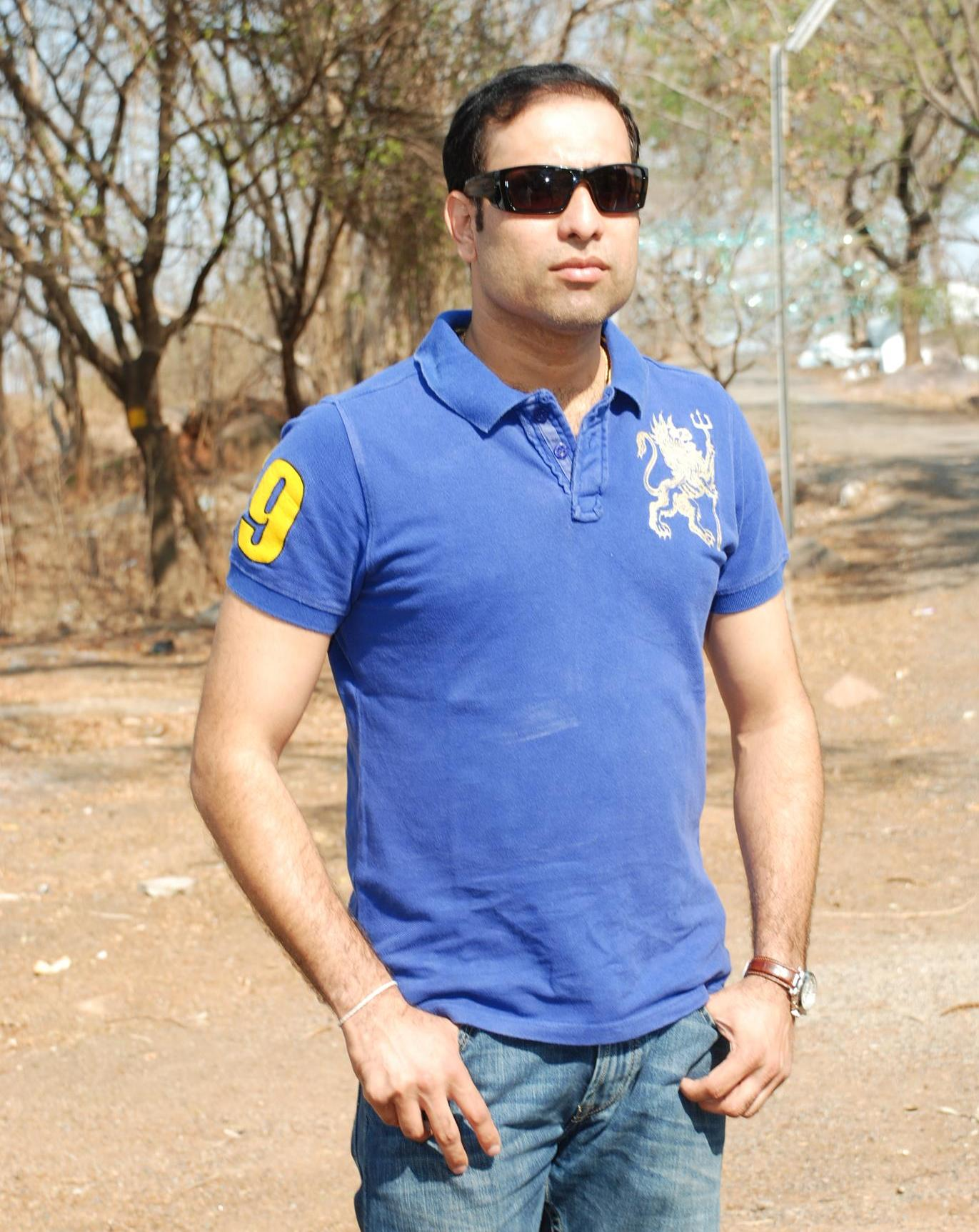
VVS Laxman

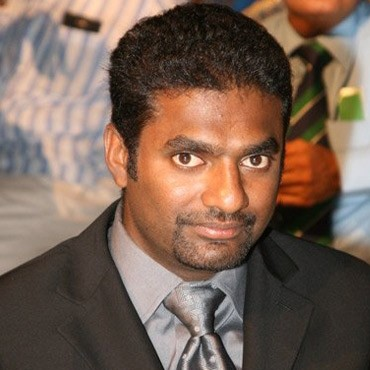
Muralitharan

Position	Name
Owner	Kalanithi Maran (Sun Network)
CEO	K Shanmugham
Head coach	Tom Moody
Assistant coach	Simon Helmot
Bowling coach	Muttiah Muralitharan
Mentor	V. V. S. Laxman
Physio	Theo Kapakoulakis
Physical trainer	Jade Roberts

== Kit manufacturers and sponsors ==
Kit Manufacturers	Shirt Sponsor (Chest)	Shirt Sponsor (Back)	Chest Branding
TYKA Sports	Red FM 93.5	Manforce	Rupa
Source :

T20 uniform

== Indian Premier League ==
A total of eight teams competed in the Indian Premier League in the 2018 season. The teams played each other twice in a home-and-away round-robin format in the league phase. Two points were awarded for each win, one point per no-result, and none for defeats. The playoff stage was played according to the page playoff system and provided top two teams in the league stage with two ways of qualifying for the Final. The top two teams first faced each other in Qualifier 1, the winner of which qualified for the Final. The third and fourth placed teams in league stage faced each other in Eliminator. The loser of Qualifier 1 played against the winner of the Eliminator in Qualifier 2, the winner of which also qualified for the Final. The winner of Final was crowned as the IPL champions.

=== Offseason ===
The fixtures for this season were released on 14 February with the Sunrisers Hyderabad playing their first match against the Rajasthan Royals on 9 April at their home ground in Hyderabad. On 28 March, David Warner resigned as the captain of the Sunrisers Hyderabad in the aftermath of a ball-tampering scandal in South Africa. The Board of Control for Cricket in India later announced on the same day that Warner along with his Australian team-mate, Steve Smith, would not be allowed to play in 2018 IPL after Cricket Australia imposed one-year ban imposed on them. The following day, the Sunrisers Hyderabad announced Kane Williamson would serve as captain and Bhuvneshwar Kumar would be vice-captain for the season. Later, they announced Alex Hales as Warner's replacement for the season. The batsman was bought for his base price of ₹10 million (US$100,000) from the Registered and Available Player Pool (RAPP) list.

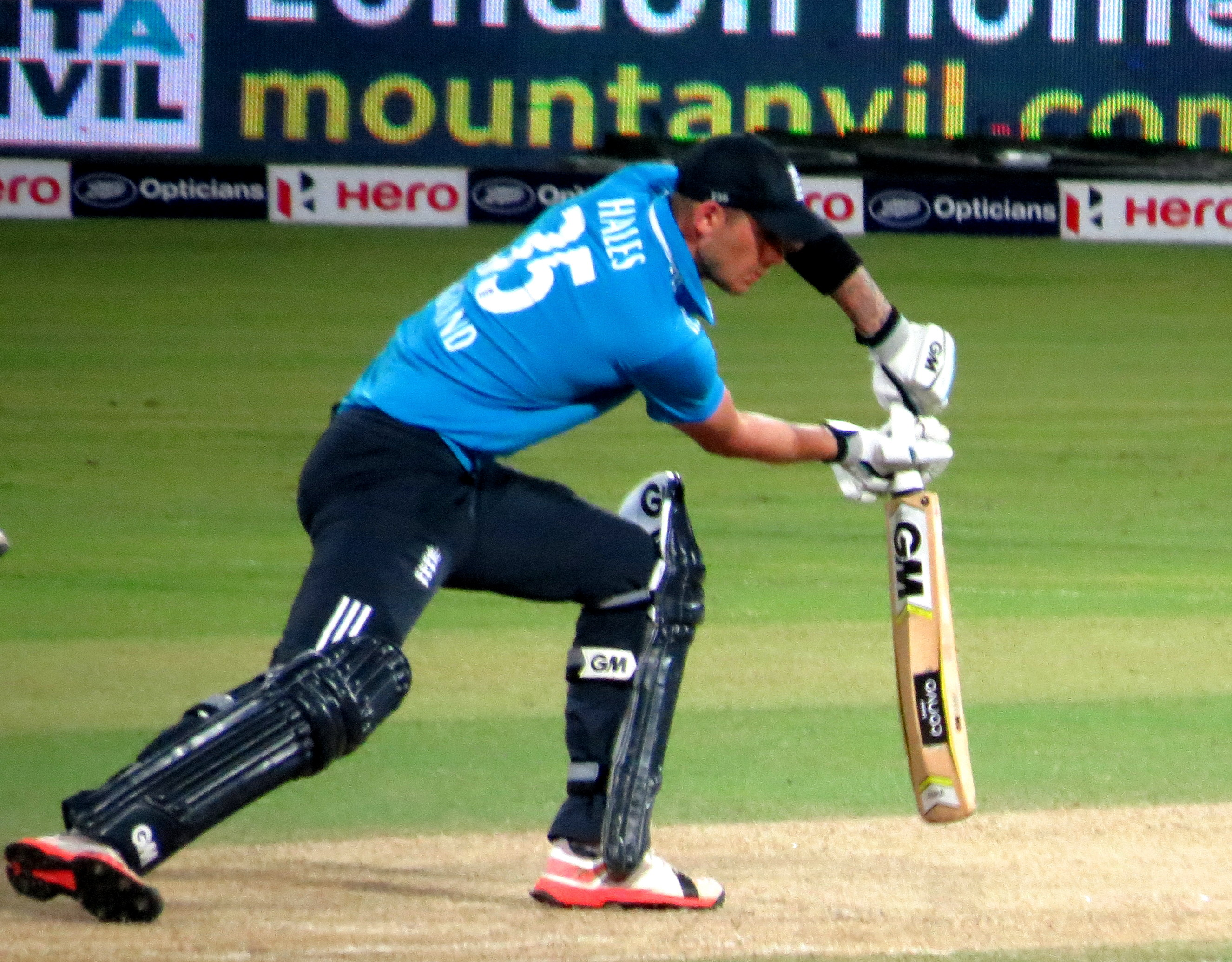
Alex Hales replaced David Warner for the season

On the squad available for this season, coach Tom Moody said,

We have a very well balanced squad where we have a number of different people that can fill different roles within the team. The success we had in the auction, we managed to get the depth and balance that we wanted. Therefore, losing an impact player like David Warner, we have managed to fill, we can still get the balance we want, still have the impact that we want in the top six. We are replacing a good captain in David Warner, who was vice captain of the Australian team, with another international captain (Kane Williamson)

=== Season summary ===
==== April ====
On 9 April, the Sunrisers started their season campaign with a nine-wicket win over the Rajasthan Royals. Williamson, the Sunrisers' new captain, elected to field first after winning toss and the bowlers justified his call with Billy Stanlake making the batsmen struggle with his awkward bounce while spin twins Rashid Khan and Shakib Al Hasan further applied brakes in middle overs. Siddharth Kaul also impressed with two scalps while ensuring that he did not leak any runs in the death overs to restrict the Royals to 125/9 in 20 overs. Wriddhiman Saha opened with Shikhar Dhawan to start the chase for the Sunrisers but fell while attempting to loft over midfield. Dhawan, who got a reprieve after Ajinkya Rahane dropped his catch at first slip on zero, slammed a 33-ball half-century to complete the Sunrisers' chase with Williamson providing a stable stand, playing his natural game and "relying on pure timing and hand-eye coordination".

On 12 April, the Sunrisers eked out a hard-fought win over the Mumbai Indians in a last-ball thriller. Earlier, Williamson won the toss and elected to field. Sandeep Sharma was handed his debut for the Sunrisers, replacing the injured Bhuvneshwar, and started troubling the Mumbai Indians batsmen right from the start, but it was Stanlake who succeeded in dismissing Rohit Sharma. Later, Kaul dismissed Ishan Kishan and Evin Lewis inside power-play. The Mumbai Indians were slowly choked in the middle overs by Rashid, who bowled 18 dot balls and took wicket of Ben Cutting. The Mumbai Indians' batsmen also played some reckless shots losing wickets which finally saw them finishing the innings with 147/8. With a low total to chase, Dhawan played aggressively and laid the platform for the chase stitching a 62-run partnership with Saha in just 6.5 overs. But the introduction of Mayank Markande saw the Sunrisers slip from 73/1 to 107/5. Yusuf Pathan and Deepak Hooda brought the Sunrisers to within 12 runs of victory before Jasprit Bumrah and Mustafizur Rahman delivered two vital strikes each. Off the final ball, Stanlake hoicked the slower delivery to the midwicket fence to script a one-wicket win.

The Sunrisers completed a hat-trick of wins in the season with a five-wicket win over the Kolkata Knight Riders on 14 April. Williamson once again won the toss and elected to field. Chris Lynn built a 39-run partnership with Nitish Rana after Bhuvneshwar removed Robin Uthappa early on. But the Sunrisers pulled the match back with Stanlake cramping Rana. Sunil Narine struggled at No.4 while an excellent catch by Manish Pandey sent Andre Russell back. Bhuvneshwar removed Dinesh Karthik in 19th over with the Sunrisers restricting the Knight Riders to 138/8. Saha provided a brisk start to the Sunrisers but the innings suffered a small collapse in the middle when spin was introduced. They recovered through a 59-run partnership between Williamson and Shakib with the former completing his half-century. In the end, Pathan finished the chase with two boundaries and a six to register the Sunrisers' first win ever at the Eden Gardens.

On 19 April, the Sunrisers lost their first match of the season to the Kings XI Punjab by 15 runs. Williamson lost the toss and was put to field. The Kings XI started batting cautiously and Chris Gayle was initially dropped on 14 off Rashid by Saha - a difficult chance. Later, Gayle stopped his limits and launched into Chris Jordan and later Rashid scoring sixes. Though Gayle slowed in the middle when the Kings XI lost two quick wickets in succession, he again targeted Rashid hammering four sixes in an over to complete his century and helped the Kings XI finish strongly at 193/3. The Sunrisers suffered a jolt early in the chase when Dhawan was forced to retire hurt after taking a blow to his elbow. They also lost Saha and Pathan early to Mohit Sharma's varying pace. Despite a 76-run stand between Williamson and Pandey, they struggled to catch up with the required run-rate. After losing Williamson and Hooda to Andrew Tye's knuckle balls, the Sunrisers could manage only 178/4 in 20 overs.

On 22 April, the Sunrisers suffered their second successive defeat, their first at home this season, to the Chennai Super Kings in a last ball thriller. The Super Kings struggled initially after being put in by Williamson, losing their openers but local player, Ambati Rayudu, used his familiarity of the ground to beat the conditions and built a 112-run partnership with Suresh Raina. Despite starting slowly, Rayudu scored 48 off his last 16 balls before he was dismissed run-out due to a misunderstanding with his partner. A late flourish by MS Dhoni in the end helped the Super Kings finish at 182/3. The Sunrisers lost three quick wickets inside power-play to Deepak Chahar but Williamson kept the Sunrisers in the hunt with his knock of 84 off 51 balls. He built a 49-run partnership with Shakib who fell to Karn Sharma while trying to pace his innings. Pathan scored two sixes off Dwayne Bravo to bring the Sunrisers back to the game but the Super Kings came back dismissing Williamson. Despite Rashid's wild knock at the end, the Sunrisers fell short by four runs.

Stanlake was ruled out of rest of the season due to a fractured finger which he sustained during the game against the Chennai Super Kings.

On 24 April, the Sunrisers successfully defended 118 to complete their double over the Mumbai Indians by systematically dismantling them for 87 - the second lowest total successfully defended ever in the IPL. The Sunrisers lost openers early to Mitchell McClenaghan after they were put to bat. Williamson and Pandey then put on a 24-run stand to resurrect the innings before Hardik Pandya dismissed both. Another slow partnership was built between Pathan and Mohammad Nabi before Markande removed the latter, restricting the Sunrisers to 118/10 in 18.4 overs. With a low total to defend, the Sunrisers attacked early taking three quick wickets inside power-play. Krunal Pandya and Suryakumar Yadav's 40-run partnership kept the Mumbai Indians in the hunt before Rashid trapped Krunal and managed to break into the Mumbai Indians' lower order. The loss of Suryakumar to Basil Thampi ended the Mumbai Indians' hopes. Mustafizur's mistimed pull in 19th over off Thampi ended the Sunrisers' losing streak.

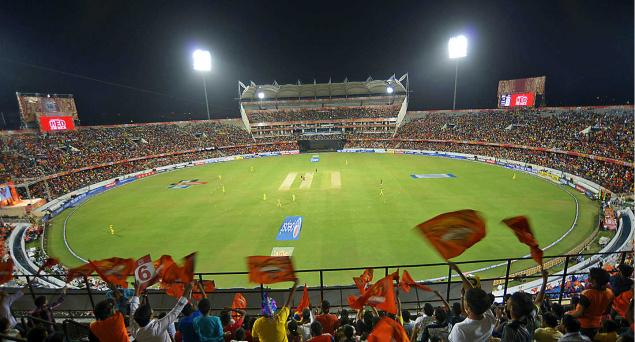
SRH fans while an IPL match in Hyderabad

On 26 April, the Sunrisers again defended another low score of 132 to win over the Kings XI Punjab. The Sunrisers struggled initially losing three quick wickets to Ankit Rajpoot, after Ravichandran Ashwin opted to field. But the Sunrisers came back when Pandey, who was put down thrice – on 4, 9 & 44 – capitalized on it to put together a 52-run partnership with Shakib, who was also given a second chance when he was caught at zero off overstepping Barinder Sran. Pandey reached his half-century while building another crucial partnership with Pathan that helped the Sunrisers get to 132/6. K. L. Rahul and Gayle gave the perfect start to the Kings XI Punjab's chase shaving 53 runs off their target in seven overs but Rashid's leg-break dismissed Rahul and opened the flood-gates for Kings XI. With Thampi bouncing Gayle off, and Rashid and Shakib commanding the middle overs sharing five wickets between them, the Kings XI lost seven wickets for 41 runs and were eventually bowled out for 119.

On 29 April, the Sunrisers achieved a hat-trick of wins for the second time in the season with a 11-run win over the Rajasthan Royals. Williamson won the toss and elected to bat first. Losing Dhawan early in the innings, Hales, who replaced Nabi, chose to bide his time to build a 92-run partnership with Williamson. Williamson paced the innings in the middle overs scoring 63 off 43 balls. But Hales' dismissal to Krishnappa Gowtham and Ish Sodhi removing Williamson sparked a collapse as Jofra Archer ran through the lineup to restrict the Sunrisers to 151/7. Sandeep ripped off Rahul Tripathi's bails early in the innings for the Sunrisers. Rahane and Sanju Samson swiftly took the Royals to 72 until Kaul's knuckle ball saw off Samson for the Sunrisers. Losing Ben Stokes and Jos Buttler to Pathan and Rashid, pressure started to mount on the Royals. With some tight bowling at the end, the Sunrisers restricted Royals to 140/6 to complete a double over them in the season.

==== May ====
On 5 May the Sunrisers posted their highest successful run-chase of the season to register a win over the Delhi Daredevils. After winning the toss and electing to bat, the Daredevils started brightly, riding on a half-century from Prithvi Shaw and a useful 44 from Shreyas Iyer to reach 95/1 in 10 overs. But the Sunrisers bowlers reeled them back with Rashid foxing Shaw and later Rishabh Pant with his varying pace. Rashid also kept his overs tight, which resulted in Naman Ojha's run-out. Vijay Shankar's last-over burst off Bhuvneshwar for 17 runs helped the Daredevils finish with 163/5. The Sunrisers openers provided the perfect start, with Hales scoring 45 off 31 balls after Glenn Maxwell dropped a sitter when Hales was on nine. They put on 76 runs in nine overs before Amit Mishra removed both. Later, Williamson and Pandey added 46 runs for third wicket before Pandey fell to Liam Plunkett while trying to pace the chase. In the end Pathan struck two fours and two sixes to complete the chase and give the Sunrisers their fourth consecutive victory in the season.

On 7 May the Sunrisers equaled their best streak of five consecutive wins by defeating the Royal Challengers Bangalore at home by five runs. Put in to bat by Virat Kohli, the Sunrisers lost three quick wickets before Williamson built a 64-run partnership with Shakib. Williamson adapted to the pitch, perfectly maneuvering the ball into the gaps with 31 coming off his first 29 balls and later increasing the pace - hitting 25 off the next nine balls. But after both set batsmen were dismissed in the space of eight deliveries, the Royal Challengers came back into the match in the final overs as the Sunrisers lost five wickets for 12 runs in the last two overs to be bowled out for 146. Royal Challengers started the chase strongly with cameo from Parthiv Patel and a flurry of shots from Kohli, who shaved 55 off the target. Once Patel was dismissed, the Royal Challengers lost three quick wickets to slip to 84/5. Mandeep Singh and Colin de Grandhomme rebuilt their chase with a 57-run partnership, but tight bowling by the Sunrisers at the end saw the Royal Challengers fall short by five runs.

On 10 May the Sunrisers successfully chased their 188-run target against the Delhi Daredevils to register a nine-wicket win and became the first team to qualify for the playoffs. Earlier, Pant scored an unbeaten 128 - the highest score by an Indian batsman in Twenty20 cricket. After their being put to field by Pant, the Sunrisers' bowling attack slowed the Daredevils' start, with Shakib dismissing Shaw and Jason Roy in successive balls. Then Iyer was dismissed run-out due to a mix-up with Pant. Harshal Patel tried to pace the innings with a couple of sixes off slower balls, but another mix-up in the middle by Pant resulted in Harshal's run-out. Later, Pant started to clear the rope with ease, taking the attack to the Sunrisers' bowlers. He brought up his century in 56 balls and finished strongly for the Daredevils, scoring 26 runs in the last over off Bhuvneshwar. Though the Sunrisers lost Hales early, Dhawan, along with Williamson, batted freely, with both maneuvering the gaps and rotating the strike. The Daredevils' bowlers tried every trick to end the partnership, but both continued to find the big overs as the Sunrisers chased the target with seven balls to spare to complete a double over the Daredevils in the season and also to extend their record-winning streak to six.

On 13 May the Chennai Super Kings snapped the Sunrisers' winning streak by handing them an eight-wicket defeat. Dhoni won the toss, and his bowlers exploited the swing to keep the Sunrisers' batting quiet. Chahar got rid of Hales and forced Dhawan and Williamson to bat cautiously. As the pitch became flat and the swing gone, both batsmen struck the ball well to complete their half-centuries and stitched together a 123-run partnership. The Super Kings pulled things back to remove both off consecutive balls, and despite a late surge by Hooda, the Super Kings were able to restrict the Sunrisers to 179/4. With no swing to assist the bowlers, the Super Kings' batsmen, Shane Watson and Rayudu, stitched together a 134-run opening partnership until a late call from Rayudu got Watson run out. But the century from Rayudu and a brisk knock from Dhoni completed the chase for the Super Kings.

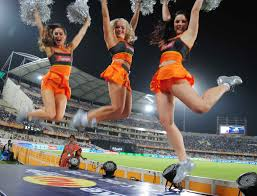
The Sunrisers Hyderabad cheerleaders

On 17 May the Sunrisers suffered their second consecutive defeat, a 14-run loss to the Royal Challengers Bangalore, in a high-scoring match, as Williamson's brisk knock of 81 in 42 balls went in vain. After winning the toss and electing to field, the Sunrisers removed Parthiv early in the first over, but Kohli played cautiously with AB de Villiers at the other end. When Rashid removed Kohli inside six overs, Moeen Ali joined hands with de Villiers to steer the match as they added 107 in 57 balls. De Grandhomme and Sarfaraz Khan provided the final flourish as the Royal Challengers added 69 in the last five overs to finish the innings with 218/6. The Sunrisers got off to a solid start, with Hales and Dhawan adding 47, but Williamson's knock helped the Sunrisers to take control of the match as he built a 135-run partnership with Pandey. Williamson's dismissal in the first ball of the last over off Mohammad Siraj sealed the win for the Royal Challengers as the Sunrisers fell short by 14 runs.

On 19 May the Kolkata Knight Riders handed a five-wicket defeat to the Sunrisers in the final league match of the season. Earlier, the Sunrisers' openers, Shreevats Goswami and Dhawan, capitalized during the power-play, scoring 60 runs. Williamson did not let the scoring rate dip for the Sunrisers after Goswami's departure. But their batting collapsed after Williamson's dismissal as the Sunrisers lost eight wickets for 45 runs in the last 43 balls, with Prasidh Krishna the best pick among the Knight Riders' bowlers with figures of 4/30. Narine set the tempo for the Knight Riders' chase and took the total to 66 in power-play. After Narine's departure, Lynn and Uthappa further firmed the Knight Riders' grip on the chase, adding 67 runs for the second wicket. Later, Karthik finished off the game for the Knight Riders as they became the third team to qualify for playoffs.

==== Playoffs ====
On 22 May, the Sunrisers lost to the Chennai Super Kings in Qualifier 1 but had another chance of making it to the finals by virtue of finishing in top two of the league stage table. After being put in to bat, the Sunrisers lost Dhawan off the first ball of the match which triggered a top-order batting collapse. Williamson and Shakib lost their wickets to short balls while Goswsami and Pathan gave return catches to Lungi Ngidi and Ravindra Jadeja. However, a late innings attack from Carlos Brathwaite, who built a 51-run partnership with Bhuvneshwar, helped the Sunrisers to finish with 139/7 in 20 overs. The Sunrisers bowlers started strongly as Bhuvneshwar removed Watson for a duck and Kaul dismissed Rayudu and Raina off successive balls. Dhoni tried to rebuild innings with Faf du Plessis but was castled by a googly from Rashid. Rashid and Shakib kept the scoring rate tight in the middle overs by regularly taking wickets. But du Plessis' late surge of 46 in his last 18 balls won the match for the Super Kings and took his team to the final.

On 25 May, the Sunrisers snapped their four-match losing streak defeating the Kolkata Knight Riders and made it to the final in the penultimate match of the season. Put in to bat, Dhawan and Saha started on a cautious note, punishing bad balls and built their partnership to 56, before Kuldeep Yadav struck twice in the same over and Chawla once to remove both set batsmen and Williamson. The Knight Riders continued to pile pressure on the Sunrisers batsmen, taking wickets regularly in the middle overs. But Rashid launched a brisk knock at the end-overs scoring 34 off just ten balls and took his team to a total of 174. The Knight Riders got off to a quick start from Narine and Lynn. Rana further ensured that the high scoring rate was maintained after Narine's departure. But a slip from Rana while running resulted in his run-out and triggered a collapse for Knight Riders, as Rashid took three wickets and Shakib took one apart from keeping the runs down. Shubman Gill kept the Knight Riders' hopes alive with some flurry of shots but Brathwaite struck twice in succession in the last over to restrict the Knight Riders to 161/9. Rashid became the first player in IPL history to score 25 runs, take three wickets, hold on to two catches and be involved in effecting a run-out in the same match.

On 27 May, the Sunrisers lost to the Chennai Super Kings in the final to end the tournament as runners-up. This was their fourth loss to the same opponent in the season. Dhoni put the Sunrisers in to bat and the team lost Goswami early. Dhawan and Williamson played cautiously in the beginning but the Sunrisers lost Dhawan to Jadeja once he tried to pace his innings. The Sunrisers made runs from their middle-order despite losing wickets at regular intervals in the middle overs. A final flourish came from Pathan and Brathwaite who finished the Sunrisers' innings at 178/6. The Super Kings lost du Plessis early but Watson and Raina did not give the Sunrisers any chance to bounce back with their 117-run partnership. Though Watson started slowly playing out Bhuvneshwar's overs, he pummeled the other Sunrisers bowlers to reach his second century in the IPL season. After Raina's departure, Rayudu joined hands with Watson to complete the chase for the Super Kings and helped them lift their third IPL trophy.

Williamson was awarded the Orange Cap for scoring most runs in the season. He became the second captain of the Sunrisers after Warner to receive the award.

== Season overview ==
=== League stage ===
Standings

Pos	Team	Pld	W	L	NR	Pts	NRR	
1	Sunrisers Hyderabad (RU)	14	9	5	0	18	0.284	Advanced to Qualifier 1
2	Chennai Super Kings (C)	14	9	5	0	18	0.253	Advanced to Qualifier 1
3	Kolkata Knight Riders (3)	14	8	6	0	16	−0.070	Advanced to the Eliminator
4	Rajasthan Royals (4)	14	7	7	0	14	−0.250	Advanced to the Eliminator
5	Mumbai Indians	14	6	8	0	12	0.317	
6	Royal Challengers Bangalore	14	6	8	0	12	0.129	
7	Kings XI Punjab	14	6	8	0	12	−0.502	
8	Delhi Daredevils	14	5	9	0	10	−0.222	

Source: ESPNcricinfo
The four top ranked teams qualify for the playoffs.

Results by match

Round	1	2	3	4	5	6	7	8	9	10	11	12	13	14
Ground	H	H	A	A	H	A	H	A	H	H	A	A	A	H
Result	W	W	W	L	L	W	W	W	W	W	W	L	L	L
Position	1	1	1	2	4	3	2	1	1	1	1	1	1	1

Source: Fixtures
A = Away; H = Home; W = Win; D = Draw; L = Loss

=== Playoff stage ===
Semifinals
22 May — Mumbai
1	Sunrisers Hyderabad	139/7 (20 overs)
2	Chennai Super Kings	140/8 (19.1 overs)
23 May — Kolkata
3	Kolkata Knight Riders	169/7 (20 overs)
4	Rajasthan Royals	144/4 (20 overs)

Preliminary final
25 May — Kolkata
1	Sunrisers Hyderabad	174/7 (20 overs)
3	Kolkata Knight Riders	160/9 (20 overs)

Final
27 May — Mumbai
2	Chennai Super Kings	181/2 (18.3 overs)
1	Sunrisers Hyderabad	178/6 (20 overs)

== Fixtures ==
=== League stage ===
9 April	Rajasthan Royals; 125/9 (20 overs)	v	Sunrisers Hyderabad (H); 127/1 (15.5 overs)	Sunrisers Hyderabad won by 9 wickets
20:00 (D/N) Round 1 Scorecard	Rajasthan Royals; 125/9 (20 overs)	v	Sunrisers Hyderabad (H); 127/1 (15.5 overs)	Rajiv Gandhi International Cricket Stadium, Hyderabad; Umpires: Nigel Llong (Eng) and Vineet Kulkarni (Ind); Player of the match: Shikhar Dhawan (Sunrisers Hyderabad)
20:00 (D/N) Round 1 Scorecard	Sanju Samson 49 (42); Siddarth Kaul 2/17 (4 overs)		Shikhar Dhawan 77* (57); Jaydev Unadkat 1/28 (3 overs)	Rajiv Gandhi International Cricket Stadium, Hyderabad; Umpires: Nigel Llong (Eng) and Vineet Kulkarni (Ind); Player of the match: Shikhar Dhawan (Sunrisers Hyderabad)
Sunrisers Hyderabad won the toss and elected to field.				Rajiv Gandhi International Cricket Stadium, Hyderabad; Umpires: Nigel Llong (Eng) and Vineet Kulkarni (Ind); Player of the match: Shikhar Dhawan (Sunrisers Hyderabad)

12 April	Mumbai Indians; 147/8 (20 overs)	v	Sunrisers Hyderabad (H); 151/9 (20 overs)	Sunrisers Hyderabad won by 1 wicket
20:00 (D/N) Round 2 Scorecard	Mumbai Indians; 147/8 (20 overs)	v	Sunrisers Hyderabad (H); 151/9 (20 overs)	Rajiv Gandhi International Cricket Stadium, Hyderabad; Umpires: Nigel Llong (Eng) and C. K. Nandan (Ind); Player of the match: Rashid Khan (Sunrisers Hyderabad)
20:00 (D/N) Round 2 Scorecard	Evin Lewis 29 (17); Sandeep Sharma 2/25 (4 overs)		Shikhar Dhawan 45 (28); Mayank Markande 4/23 (4 overs)	Rajiv Gandhi International Cricket Stadium, Hyderabad; Umpires: Nigel Llong (Eng) and C. K. Nandan (Ind); Player of the match: Rashid Khan (Sunrisers Hyderabad)
Sunrisers Hyderabad won the toss and elected to field.				Rajiv Gandhi International Cricket Stadium, Hyderabad; Umpires: Nigel Llong (Eng) and C. K. Nandan (Ind); Player of the match: Rashid Khan (Sunrisers Hyderabad)

14 April	(H) Kolkata Knight Riders; 138/8 (20 overs)	v	Sunrisers Hyderabad; 139/5 (19 overs)	Sunrisers Hyderabad won by 5 wickets
20:00 (D/N) Round 3 Scorecard	(H) Kolkata Knight Riders; 138/8 (20 overs)	v	Sunrisers Hyderabad; 139/5 (19 overs)	Eden Gardens, Kolkata; Umpires: Anil Chaudhary (Ind) and Nand Kishore (Ind); Player of the match: Billy Stanlake (Sunrisers Hyderabad)
20:00 (D/N) Round 3 Scorecard	Chris Lynn 49 (34); Bhuvneshwar Kumar 3/26 (4 overs)		Kane Williamson 50 (44); Sunil Narine 2/17 (4 overs)	Eden Gardens, Kolkata; Umpires: Anil Chaudhary (Ind) and Nand Kishore (Ind); Player of the match: Billy Stanlake (Sunrisers Hyderabad)
Sunrisers Hyderabad won the toss and elected to field.; Shivam Mavi and Shubman Gill (both Kolkata Knight Riders) made their T20 debuts.				Eden Gardens, Kolkata; Umpires: Anil Chaudhary (Ind) and Nand Kishore (Ind); Player of the match: Billy Stanlake (Sunrisers Hyderabad)

19 April	(H) Kings XI Punjab; 193/3 (20 overs)	v	Sunrisers Hyderabad; 178/4 (20 overs)	Kings XI Punjab won by 15 runs
20:00 (D/N) Round 4 Scorecard	(H) Kings XI Punjab; 193/3 (20 overs)	v	Sunrisers Hyderabad; 178/4 (20 overs)	Punjab Cricket Association Stadium, Mohali; Umpires: Anil Chaudhary (Ind) and Nigel Llong (Eng); Player of the match: Chris Gayle (Kings XI Punjab)
20:00 (D/N) Round 4 Scorecard	Chris Gayle 104* (63); Bhuvneshwar Kumar 1/25 (4 overs)		Manish Pandey 57* (42); Andrew Tye 2/23 (4 overs)	Punjab Cricket Association Stadium, Mohali; Umpires: Anil Chaudhary (Ind) and Nigel Llong (Eng); Player of the match: Chris Gayle (Kings XI Punjab)
Kings XI Punjab won the toss and elected to bat.				Punjab Cricket Association Stadium, Mohali; Umpires: Anil Chaudhary (Ind) and Nigel Llong (Eng); Player of the match: Chris Gayle (Kings XI Punjab)

22 April	Chennai Super Kings; 182/3 (20 overs)	v	Sunrisers Hyderabad (H); 178/6 (20 overs)	Chennai Super Kings won by 4 runs
16:00 (D/N) Round 5 Scorecard	Chennai Super Kings; 182/3 (20 overs)	v	Sunrisers Hyderabad (H); 178/6 (20 overs)	Rajiv Gandhi International Cricket Stadium, Hyderabad; Umpires: Anil Chaudhary (Ind) and Vineet Kulkarni (Ind); Player of the match: Ambati Rayudu (Chennai Super Kings)
16:00 (D/N) Round 5 Scorecard	Ambati Rayudu 79 (37); Bhuvneshwar Kumar 1/22 (3 overs)		Kane Williamson 84 (51); Deepak Chahar 3/15 (4 overs)	Rajiv Gandhi International Cricket Stadium, Hyderabad; Umpires: Anil Chaudhary (Ind) and Vineet Kulkarni (Ind); Player of the match: Ambati Rayudu (Chennai Super Kings)
Sunrisers Hyderabad won the toss and elected to field.				Rajiv Gandhi International Cricket Stadium, Hyderabad; Umpires: Anil Chaudhary (Ind) and Vineet Kulkarni (Ind); Player of the match: Ambati Rayudu (Chennai Super Kings)

24 April	Sunrisers Hyderabad; 118 (18.4 overs)	v	Mumbai Indians (H); 87 (18.5 overs)	Sunrisers Hyderabad won by 31 runs
20:00 (D/N) Round 6 Scorecard	Sunrisers Hyderabad; 118 (18.4 overs)	v	Mumbai Indians (H); 87 (18.5 overs)	Wankhede Stadium, Mumbai; Umpires: Sundaram Ravi (Ind) and C Shamshuddin (Ind); Player of the match: Rashid Khan (Sunrisers Hyderabad)
20:00 (D/N) Round 6 Scorecard	Kane Williamson 29 (21); Mayank Markande 2/15 (3 overs)		Suryakumar Yadav 34 (38); Siddarth Kaul 3/23 (4 overs)	Wankhede Stadium, Mumbai; Umpires: Sundaram Ravi (Ind) and C Shamshuddin (Ind); Player of the match: Rashid Khan (Sunrisers Hyderabad)
Mumbai Indians won the toss and elected to field.; Mumbai Indians recorded their joint-lowest total (87) in the IPL.				Wankhede Stadium, Mumbai; Umpires: Sundaram Ravi (Ind) and C Shamshuddin (Ind); Player of the match: Rashid Khan (Sunrisers Hyderabad)

26 April	(H) Sunrisers Hyderabad; 132/6 (20 overs)	v	Kings XI Punjab; 119 (19.2 overs)	Sunrisers Hyderabad won by 13 runs
20:00 (D/N) Round 7 Scorecard	(H) Sunrisers Hyderabad; 132/6 (20 overs)	v	Kings XI Punjab; 119 (19.2 overs)	Rajiv Gandhi International Cricket Stadium, Hyderabad; Umpires: Yeshwant Barde (Ind) and C. K. Nandan (Ind); Player of the match: Ankit Rajpoot (Kings XI Punjab)
20:00 (D/N) Round 7 Scorecard	Manish Pandey 54 (51); Ankit Rajpoot 5/14 (4 overs)		K. L. Rahul 32 (26); Rashid Khan 3/19 (4 overs)	Rajiv Gandhi International Cricket Stadium, Hyderabad; Umpires: Yeshwant Barde (Ind) and C. K. Nandan (Ind); Player of the match: Ankit Rajpoot (Kings XI Punjab)
Kings XI Punjab won the toss and elected to field.; Ankit Rajpoot (Kings XI Punjab) recorded the best bowling figures by an Indian uncapped fast bowler.				Rajiv Gandhi International Cricket Stadium, Hyderabad; Umpires: Yeshwant Barde (Ind) and C. K. Nandan (Ind); Player of the match: Ankit Rajpoot (Kings XI Punjab)

29 April	Sunrisers Hyderabad; 151/7 (20 overs)	v	Rajasthan Royals (H); 140/6 (20 overs)	Sunrisers Hyderabad won by 11 runs
16:00 (D/N) Round 8 Scorecard	Sunrisers Hyderabad; 151/7 (20 overs)	v	Rajasthan Royals (H); 140/6 (20 overs)	Sawai Mansingh Stadium, Jaipur; Umpires: Nand Kishore (Ind) and Bruce Oxenford (Aus); Player of the match: Kane Williamson (Sunrisers Hyderabad)
16:00 (D/N) Round 8 Scorecard	Kane Williamson 63 (43); Jofra Archer 3/26 (4 overs)		Ajinkya Rahane 65* (53); Siddarth Kaul 2/23 (4 overs)	Sawai Mansingh Stadium, Jaipur; Umpires: Nand Kishore (Ind) and Bruce Oxenford (Aus); Player of the match: Kane Williamson (Sunrisers Hyderabad)
Sunrisers Hyderabad won the toss and elected to bat.				Sawai Mansingh Stadium, Jaipur; Umpires: Nand Kishore (Ind) and Bruce Oxenford (Aus); Player of the match: Kane Williamson (Sunrisers Hyderabad)

5 May	Delhi Daredevils; 163/5 (20 overs)	v	Sunrisers Hyderabad (H); 164/3 (19.5 overs)	Sunrisers Hyderabad won by 7 wickets
20:00 (D/N) Round 9 Scorecard	Delhi Daredevils; 163/5 (20 overs)	v	Sunrisers Hyderabad (H); 164/3 (19.5 overs)	Rajiv Gandhi International Cricket Stadium, Hyderabad; Umpires: C. K. Nandan (Ind) and Bruce Oxenford (Aus); Player of the match: Rashid Khan (Sunrisers Hyderabad)
20:00 (D/N) Round 9 Scorecard	Prithvi Shaw 65 (36); Rashid Khan 2/23 (4 overs)		Alex Hales 45 (31); Amit Mishra 2/19 (4 overs)	Rajiv Gandhi International Cricket Stadium, Hyderabad; Umpires: C. K. Nandan (Ind) and Bruce Oxenford (Aus); Player of the match: Rashid Khan (Sunrisers Hyderabad)
Delhi Daredevils won the toss and elected to bat.				Rajiv Gandhi International Cricket Stadium, Hyderabad; Umpires: C. K. Nandan (Ind) and Bruce Oxenford (Aus); Player of the match: Rashid Khan (Sunrisers Hyderabad)

7 May	(H) Sunrisers Hyderabad; 146/10 (20 overs)	v	Royal Challengers Bangalore; 141/6 (20 overs)	Sunrisers Hyderabad won by 5 runs
20:00 (D/N) Round 10 Scorecard	(H) Sunrisers Hyderabad; 146/10 (20 overs)	v	Royal Challengers Bangalore; 141/6 (20 overs)	Rajiv Gandhi International Cricket Stadium, Hyderabad; Umpires: Bruce Oxenford (Aus) and Virender Sharma (Ind); Player of the match: Kane Williamson (Sunrisers Hyderabad)
20:00 (D/N) Round 10 Scorecard	Kane Williamson 56 (39); Mohammad Siraj 3/25 (4 overs)		Virat Kohli 39 (30); Shakib Al Hasan 2/36 (4 overs)	Rajiv Gandhi International Cricket Stadium, Hyderabad; Umpires: Bruce Oxenford (Aus) and Virender Sharma (Ind); Player of the match: Kane Williamson (Sunrisers Hyderabad)
Royal Challengers Bangalore won the toss and elected to field.				Rajiv Gandhi International Cricket Stadium, Hyderabad; Umpires: Bruce Oxenford (Aus) and Virender Sharma (Ind); Player of the match: Kane Williamson (Sunrisers Hyderabad)

10 May	(H) Delhi Daredevils; 187/5 (20 overs)	v	Sunrisers Hyderabad; 191/1 (18.5 overs)	Sunrisers Hyderabad won by 9 wickets
20:00 (D/N) Round 11 Scorecard	(H) Delhi Daredevils; 187/5 (20 overs)	v	Sunrisers Hyderabad; 191/1 (18.5 overs)	Feroz Shah Kotla Ground, Delhi; Umpires: C Shamshuddin (Ind) and Anil Dandekar (Ind); Player of the match: Shikhar Dhawan (Sunrisers Hyderabad)
20:00 (D/N) Round 11 Scorecard	Rishabh Pant 128* (63); Shakib Al Hasan 2/27 (4 overs)		Shikhar Dhawan 92* (50); Harshal Patel 1/32 (4 overs)	Feroz Shah Kotla Ground, Delhi; Umpires: C Shamshuddin (Ind) and Anil Dandekar (Ind); Player of the match: Shikhar Dhawan (Sunrisers Hyderabad)
Delhi Daredevils won the toss and elected to field.				Feroz Shah Kotla Ground, Delhi; Umpires: C Shamshuddin (Ind) and Anil Dandekar (Ind); Player of the match: Shikhar Dhawan (Sunrisers Hyderabad)

13 May	Sunrisers Hyderabad; 179/4 (20 overs)	v	Chennai Super Kings (H); 180/2 (19 overs)	Chennai Super Kings won by 8 wickets
16:00 (D/N) Round 12 Scorecard	Sunrisers Hyderabad; 179/4 (20 overs)	v	Chennai Super Kings (H); 180/2 (19 overs)	M. A. Chidambaram Stadium, Chennai; Umpires: Marais Erasmus (SA) and Yeshwant Barde (Ind); Player of the match: Ambati Rayudu (Chennai Super Kings)
16:00 (D/N) Round 12 Scorecard	Shikhar Dhawan 78 (49); Shardul Thakur 2/32 (4 overs)		Ambati Rayudu 100* (62); Sandeep Sharma 1/36 (4 overs)	M. A. Chidambaram Stadium, Chennai; Umpires: Marais Erasmus (SA) and Yeshwant Barde (Ind); Player of the match: Ambati Rayudu (Chennai Super Kings)
Chennai Super Kings won the toss and elected to field; Ambati Rayudu (Chennai Super Kings) scored his maiden T20 century.				M. A. Chidambaram Stadium, Chennai; Umpires: Marais Erasmus (SA) and Yeshwant Barde (Ind); Player of the match: Ambati Rayudu (Chennai Super Kings)

17 May	(H) Royal Challengers Bangalore; 218/6 (20 overs)	v	Sunrisers Hyderabad; 204/3 (20 overs)	Royal Challengers Bangalore won by 14 runs
20:00 (D/N) Round 13 Scorecard	(H) Royal Challengers Bangalore; 218/6 (20 overs)	v	Sunrisers Hyderabad; 204/3 (20 overs)	M Chinnaswamy Stadium, Bangalore; Umpires: Anil Dandekar (Ind) and Sundaram Ravi (Ind); Player of the match: AB de Villiers (Royal Challengers Bangalore)
20:00 (D/N) Round 13 Scorecard	AB de Villiers 69(39); Rashid Khan 3/27 (4 overs)		Kane Williamson 81 (42); Moeen Ali 1/21 (2 overs)	M Chinnaswamy Stadium, Bangalore; Umpires: Anil Dandekar (Ind) and Sundaram Ravi (Ind); Player of the match: AB de Villiers (Royal Challengers Bangalore)
Sunrisers Hyderabad won the toss and elected to field.; Basil Thampi (Sunrisers Hyderabad) bowled the most expensive spell (0/70 off 4 overs) in IPL history.				M Chinnaswamy Stadium, Bangalore; Umpires: Anil Dandekar (Ind) and Sundaram Ravi (Ind); Player of the match: AB de Villiers (Royal Challengers Bangalore)

19 May	(H) Sunrisers Hyderabad; 172/9 (20 overs)	v	Kolkata Knight Riders; 173/5 (19.4 overs)	Kolkata Knight Riders won by 5 wickets
20:00 (D/N) Round 14 Scorecard	(H) Sunrisers Hyderabad; 172/9 (20 overs)	v	Kolkata Knight Riders; 173/5 (19.4 overs)	Rajiv Gandhi International Cricket Stadium, Hyderabad; Umpires: Anil Chaudhary (India) and Sundaram Ravi (India); Player of the match: Chris Lynn (Kolkata Knight Riders)
20:00 (D/N) Round 14 Scorecard	Shikhar Dhawan 50 (39); Prasidh Krishna 4/30 (4 overs)		Chris Lynn 55 (43); Carlos Brathwaite 2/21 (2.4 overs)	Rajiv Gandhi International Cricket Stadium, Hyderabad; Umpires: Anil Chaudhary (India) and Sundaram Ravi (India); Player of the match: Chris Lynn (Kolkata Knight Riders)
Sunrisers Hyderabad won the toss and elected to bat.				Rajiv Gandhi International Cricket Stadium, Hyderabad; Umpires: Anil Chaudhary (India) and Sundaram Ravi (India); Player of the match: Chris Lynn (Kolkata Knight Riders)

=== Playoff stage ===
==== Qualifier 1 ====
22 May	Sunrisers Hyderabad; 139/7 (20 overs)	v	Chennai Super Kings; 140/8 (19.1 overs)	Chennai Super Kings won by 2 Wickets
19:00 (D/N) Qualifier 1 Scorecard	Sunrisers Hyderabad; 139/7 (20 overs)	v	Chennai Super Kings; 140/8 (19.1 overs)	Wankhede Stadium, Mumbai; Umpires: Marais Erasmus (SA) and Chettithody Shamshuddin (Ind); Player of the match: Faf du Plessis (Chennai Super Kings)
19:00 (D/N) Qualifier 1 Scorecard	Carlos Brathwaite 43* (29); Dwayne Bravo 2/25 (4 overs)		Faf du Plessis 67* (42); Rashid Khan 2/11 (4 overs)	Wankhede Stadium, Mumbai; Umpires: Marais Erasmus (SA) and Chettithody Shamshuddin (Ind); Player of the match: Faf du Plessis (Chennai Super Kings)
Chennai Super Kings won the toss and elected to field.				Wankhede Stadium, Mumbai; Umpires: Marais Erasmus (SA) and Chettithody Shamshuddin (Ind); Player of the match: Faf du Plessis (Chennai Super Kings)

==== Qualifier 2 ====
25 May	Sunrisers Hyderabad; 174/7 (20 overs)	v	Kolkata Knight Riders; 160/9 (20 overs)	Sunrisers Hyderabad won by 14 runs
19:00 (D/N) Qualifier 2 Scorecard	Sunrisers Hyderabad; 174/7 (20 overs)	v	Kolkata Knight Riders; 160/9 (20 overs)	Eden Gardens, Kolkata; Umpires: Kumar Dharmasena (SL) and Nitin Menon (Ind); Player of the match: Rashid Khan (Sunrisers Hyderabad)
19:00 (D/N) Qualifier 2 Scorecard	Wriddhiman Saha 35(27); Kuldeep Yadav 2/29(4 overs)		Chris Lynn 48(31); Rashid Khan 3/19 (4 overs)	Eden Gardens, Kolkata; Umpires: Kumar Dharmasena (SL) and Nitin Menon (Ind); Player of the match: Rashid Khan (Sunrisers Hyderabad)
Kolkata Knight Riders won the toss and choose to field.				Eden Gardens, Kolkata; Umpires: Kumar Dharmasena (SL) and Nitin Menon (Ind); Player of the match: Rashid Khan (Sunrisers Hyderabad)

==== Final ====
27 May	Sunrisers Hyderabad; 178/6 (20 overs)	v	Chennai Super Kings; 181/2 (18.3 overs)	Chennai Super Kings won by 8 wickets
19:00 (D/N) Final Scorecard	Sunrisers Hyderabad; 178/6 (20 overs)	v	Chennai Super Kings; 181/2 (18.3 overs)	Wankhede Stadium, Mumbai; Umpires: Marais Erasmus (SA) and Sundaram Ravi (Ind); Player of the match: Shane Watson (Chennai Super Kings)
19:00 (D/N) Final Scorecard	Kane Williamson 47 (36); Ravindra Jadeja 1/24 (2 overs)		Shane Watson 117* (57); Carlos Brathwaite 1/27 (2.3 overs)	Wankhede Stadium, Mumbai; Umpires: Marais Erasmus (SA) and Sundaram Ravi (Ind); Player of the match: Shane Watson (Chennai Super Kings)
Chennai Super Kings won the toss and elected to field.; Chennai Super Kings won the 2018 Indian Premier League and became the second team to win a IPL title thrice.; Chennai Super Kings became the first team to beat a side four times in a single season of IPL.				Wankhede Stadium, Mumbai; Umpires: Marais Erasmus (SA) and Sundaram Ravi (Ind); Player of the match: Shane Watson (Chennai Super Kings)

== Statistics ==
Name	Mat	Runs	HS	Ave	SR	Wkts	BBI	Ave	Eco	Ct	St
Kane Williamson	17	735	84	52.50	142.44	–	–	–	–	6	0
Shikhar Dhawan	16	497	92*	38.23	136.91	–	–	–	–	12	0
Yusuf Pathan	15	260	45*	28.88	130.00	1	1/14	14.00	7.00	3	0
Manish Pandey	15	284	62*	25.81	115.44	–	–	–	–	9	0
Carlos Brathwaite	4	75	43*	25.00	156.25	5	2/15	18.80	9.24	2	0
Alex Hales	6	148	45	24.66	125.42	–	–	–	–	2	0
Deepak Hooda	9	87	32*	21.75	107.40	0	–	–	8.00	3	0
Shakib Al Hasan	17	239	35	21.72	121.31	14	2/18	32.57	8.00	3	0
Shreevats Goswami	6	52	35	17.33	130.00	–	–	–	–	5	0
Wriddhiman Saha	11	122	35	15.25	119.60	–	–	–	–	5	1
Rashid Khan	17	59	34*	11.80	190.32	21	3/19	21.80	6.73	6	0
Mohammad Nabi	2	18	14	9.00	150.00	1	1/23	47.00	9.40	0	0
Bhuvneshwar Kumar	12	13	7	6.50	81.25	9	3/26	39.33	7.66	2	0
Basil Thampi	4	3	3	3.00	50.00	5	2/4	22.80	11.21	2	0
Siddarth Kaul	17	3	2	1.00	21.42	21	3/23	26.04	8.28	2	0
Ricky Bhui	1	0	0	0.00	0.00	–	–	–	–	0	0
Sandeep Sharma	12	0	0*	0.00	0.00	12	2/17	27.75	7.56	2	0
Billy Stanlake	4	5	5*	–	250.00	5	2/21	26.00	8.12	0	0
Khaleel Ahmed	1	–	–	–	–	0	–	–	12.66	0	0
Chris Jordan	1	–	–	–	–	0	–	–	7.75	0	0

IPL Statistics Full Table on ESPNcricinfo

Last updated: 27 May 2018

== Awards and achievements ==
=== Awards ===
Man of the Match

No.	Date	Player	Opponent	Venue	Result	Contribution	Ref.
1	9 April 2018	Shikhar Dhawan	Rajasthan Royals	Hyderabad	Won by 9 wickets	77* (57)	
2	12 April 2018	Rashid Khan	Mumbai Indians	Hyderabad	Won by 1 wicket	0 (1) & 1/13 (4 overs)	
3	14 April 2018	Billy Stanlake	Kolkata Knight Riders	Kolkata	Won by 5 wickets	2/21 (4 overs)	
4	24 April 2018	Rashid Khan	Mumbai Indians	Mumbai	Won by 31 runs	6 (9) & 2/11 (4 overs)	
5	29 April 2018	Kane Williamson	Rajasthan Royals	Jaipur	Won by 11 runs	63 (43)	
6	5 May 2018	Rashid Khan	Delhi Daredevils	Hyderabad	Won by 7 wickets	2/23 (4 overs)	
7	7 May 2018	Kane Williamson	Royal Challengers Bangalore	Hyderabad	Won by 5 runs	56 (39)	
8	10 May 2018	Shikhar Dhawan	Delhi Daredevils	New Delhi	Won by 9 wickets	92* (50)	
9	25 May 2018	Rashid Khan	Kolkata Knight Riders	Kolkata	Won by 13 runs	34 (10) & 3/19 (4 overs)	

Season awards

- Winner of the Orange Cap : Kane Williamson

=== Achievements ===
- Longest all-time winning streak for the Sunrisers : 6
- Most dot balls bowled in the 2018 IPL : Rashid Khan (167)
- Most half-centuries scored in the 2018 IPL : Kane Williamson (8)

== Reaction ==
The Sunrisers captain Kane Williamson praised Rashid Khan for his IPL stint. He said, “He’s a world-class player. It’s always a pleasure to face him at the nets and against him as well in the near future. The full package Rashid is, it is great to have him in the side and he had a brilliant year.”

Despite the loss in the final to the Chennai Super Kings, Sunrisers coach Tom Moody was satisfied with his team's overall performance in the season. He said, “At the end, we ended on the top of the table. We played well at home and away as well. As a full package, we are very satisfied.” Moody also praised Williamson, saying, “Kane has shown the cricketing world that he can play all three formats with utmost authority. And when he's captain, every team is very lucky. We're fortunate to have him in our squad. He has truly been wonderful right throughout the tournament." He called Rashid "a terrific cricketer.”

The Sunrisers' mentor V. V. S. Laxman also commented on the team's performance. He said, “Well, the three biggest positives for Sunrisers in this IPL were 1. Kane Williamson as captain and batsman; he was sensational. 2. The way we won matches under tremendous pressure, defending low totals. 3 The evolution of Rashid Khan as a high-impact bowler with his great consistency and wicket-taking ability”. “This is what we as a franchisee always take pride in — letting players express themselves freely on and off the field,” he added.

Three Sunrisers players — Williamson, Rashid and Siddarth Kaul were featured in the CricBuzz Team XI of 2018 IPL. Both Williamson and Rashid were also featured in the ESPNcricinfo IPL team of the season.

The 2018 season performances helped the IPL see its brand value jump by 19% to the estimated value of US$6.3 billion. The Sunrisers also saw the increase in their brand value which was estimated to be US$70 million in 2018, according to Duff & Phelps.

== See also ==
- List of Sunrisers Hyderabad records
- List of Sunrisers Hyderabad cricketers
