= List of Sunrisers Hyderabad cricketers =

Sunrisers Hyderabad
- Nickname: Orange Army

Personnel
- Captain: Pat Cummins
- Coach: Daniel Vettori
- Owner: Kalanithi Maran (Sun Group)

Team information
- City: Hyderabad, Telangana, India
- Founded: 2012
- Home ground: Rajiv Gandhi International Cricket Stadium, Hyderabad
- Capacity: 55,000
- Secondary home ground(s): Dr. Y. S. Rajasekhara Reddy ACA–VDCA Cricket Stadium, Vizag

History
- Indian Premier League wins: 1 (2016)
- Official website: www.sunrisershyderabad.in

The Sunrisers Hyderabad (often abbreviated as SRH) are a franchise cricket team based in Hyderabad, Telangana, that compete in the Indian Premier League (IPL). The team is owned by Kalanithi Maran of the Sun TV Network who won the bid for the franchise at ₹850.5 million per year on a five-year deal in 2012 following the termination of the previous Hyderabad-based franchise, Deccan Chargers, from the IPL. Having made its first IPL playoffs appearance in its debut season in 2013, the team had qualified for the playoffs consecutively from the 2016 season until the 2020 season. The team also qualified for the playoffs in the 2024 season. They have reached the finals thrice, most recently in the 2024 season, and won their only title in the 2016 season after defeating the Royal Challengers Bangalore by 8 runs in the Final.

As of June 2022, the team was captained by Kane Williamson and coached by Tom Moody with Simon Helmot as assistant coach, Muttiah Muralitharan and Dale Steyn as bowling coaches, Brian Lara as batting coach and Hemang Badani as fielding coach. The team has played its home matches in the 55,000-capacity Rajiv Gandhi International Cricket Stadium in Hyderabad since its inception. The coronavirus pandemic impacted the brand value of the Sunrisers Hyderabad which was estimated to be US$57.4million in 2020 as the overall brand of IPL was decreased to US$4.4billion, according to Brand Finance.

Bhuvneshwar Kumar has the most appearances for the SRH with 115 matches while David Warner is the team's current leading run scorer with 4,014 runs. Shikhar Dhawan, Williamson and Warner are the only batsmen to have scored more than 2,000 runs in total for the team, while Jonny Bairstow, Manish Pandey, Heinrich Klaasen and Abhishek Sharma are the only other batsmen to cross the 1,000-run mark. Warner has the highest batting average at 49.55 and Travis Head has the highest strike rate at 158.23 respectively among players who faced more than 250 balls. Warner scored the most runs in a single match for the SRH, with a knock of 126 runs off 59 balls while Warner, Bairstow, Harry Brook, Klaasen, Head, Ishan Kishan and Abhishek are the centurions for the team. In bowling, Kumar is the team's leading wicket-taker with 130 wickets to his name. Kumar and Umran Malik are the only bowlers to take a five-wicket haul for the SRH. Jason Holder has the best bowling average (16.61) among the players who have bowled more than 20 overs. Holder also has the lowest bowling strike rate for the team while Rashid Khan has the best economy rate at 12.10 and 6.33 respectively among the players who bowled over 20 overs. Amit Mishra is the only SRH bowler to claim a hat-trick. In fielding, Warner has taken the most catches for the team (46) while Naman Ojha has effected 38 dismissals, the highest behind the wickets for the team, including 36 catches and 2 stumpings.

== Players ==
Key

- § – Member of the current squad
- † – Captain
- ‡ – Wicket-keeper
- First – Year of Twenty20 debut for the SRH
- Last – Year of latest Twenty20 match for the SRH
- * – Batsman remained not out

The Sunrisers capped cricketers
General						Batting								Bowling				Fielding	
Name	Nationality (Note: The information in the nationality column is according to ESPNcricinfo. This information may not necessarily reflect the player's birthplace or citizenship.)	First	Last	Mat	Inn	NO	Runs	HS	100	50 (Note: A century made is not listed as an additional half century.)	Avg	SR	Balls (Note: This does not include illegal deliveries like no-balls and wides.)	Wkt	BBI (Note: The BBI has not been provided for those bowlers who have not taken any wicket while playing for RR.)	ER (Note: Average runs concede by bowlers while playing for RR.)	Ave	Ca	St
Kumar Sangakkara ‡	Sri Lanka	2013	2013	9	9	0	120	28	0	0	13.33	88.24	0	–	–	–	–	3	0
Quinton de Kock ‡	South Africa	2013	2013	3	3	0	6	4	0	0	2.00	40.00	0	–	–	–	–	3	1
Shikhar Dhawan †	India	2013	2018	91	91	12	2768	92*	0	21	35.03	125.13	0	–	–	–	–	41	0
Parthiv Patel ‡	India	2013	2013	19	19	0	461	61	0	2	24.26	116.12	0	–	–	–	–	3	0
Dwaraka Ravi Teja	India	2013	2013	2	2	1	14	10	0	0	14.00	82.35	0	–	–	–	–	0	0
Akshath Reddy	India	2013	2013	7	7	0	91	27	0	0	13.00	90.10	0	–	–	–	–	2	0
Cameron White †	Australia	2013	2013	14	14	1	234	52	0	1	18.00	109.34	12	1	1/14	8.00	16.00	10	0
Ashish Reddy	India	2013	2016	27	20	7	248	36*	0	0	19.07	146.74	99	7	1/7	9.63	22.71	10	0
JP Duminy	South Africa	2013	2013	6	6	3	117	57*	0	1	39.00	99.15	48	2	2/27	8.12	32.50	0	0
Thisara Perera	Sri Lanka	2013	2013	21	18	6	345	57*	0	1	28.75	148.06	463	22	3/20	8.66	30.40	8	0
Biplab Samantray	India	2013	2013	12	10	2	131	55	0	1	16.37	100.00	0	–	–	–	–	3	0
Darren Sammy †	West Indies	2013	2014	26	23	6	388	60	0	2	22.82	132.42	326	16	4/22	8.77	29.81	9	0
Hanuma Vihari	India	2013	2015	25	24	4	304	46	0	0	15.20	88.62	42	1	1/5	6.57	46.00	6	0
Anand Rajan	India	2013	2013	2	0	0	–	–	0	0	–	–	48	2	1/20	5.25	21.00	1	0
Ankit Sharma	India	2013	2013	1	0	0	–	–	0	0	–	–	12	0	0/17	8.50	–	1	0
Amit Mishra	India	2013	2014	33	10	4	93	30	0	0	13.28	90.29	693	30	4/19	7.26	27.96	3	0
Ishant Sharma	India	2013	2015	29	2	2	0	0*	0	0	0.00	0.00	646	25	3/27	8.54	36.80	6	0
Karn Sharma	India	2013	2016	52	30	15	302	39*	0	0	20.13	120.80	888	37	4/38	7.82	31.29	8	0
Dale Steyn	South Africa	2013	2015	43	17	11	132	27*	0	0	22.00	143.37	995	39	3/11	6.87	29.23	14	0
Thalaivan Sargunam	India	2013	2013	1	1	0	10	10	0	0	10.00	58.82	0	–	–	–	–	0	0
Anirudha Srikkanth	India	2014	2014	1	1	0	3	3	0	0	3.00	60.00	0	–	–	–	–	0	0
Aaron Finch	Australia	2014	2014	13	13	2	309	88*	0	2	28.09	117.49	0	–	–	–	–	6	0
Naman Ojha ‡	India	2014	2017	56	39	9	584	79*	0	1	19.47	120.41	0	–	–	–	–	36	2
KL Rahul ‡	India	2014	2015	20	16	3	308	46	0	0	23.69	106.21	0	–	–	–	–	5	0
Venugopal Rao	India	2014	2014	7	5	2	71	27	0	0	23.67	112.70	12	0	0/7	8.00	–	2	0
David Warner †	Australia	2014	2021	95	95	14	4014	126	2	40	49.56	142.59	1	0	0/2	12.00	–	46	0
Moises Henriques	Australia	2014	2017	42	37	10	755	74*	0	5	27.96	128.84	666	28	3/16	8.26	32.75	18	0
Jason Holder	West Indies	2014	2021	16	12	3	167	47*	0	0	18.56	121.90	377	31	4/52	8.20	16.61	4	0
Parvez Rasool	India	2014	2015	5	2	2	2	2*	0	0	–	100.00	84	2	1/20	8.14	57.00	1	0
Irfan Pathan	India	2014	2014	10	6	4	55	23*	0	0	27.50	101.85	142	4	2/10	8.66	51.25	2	0
Bhuvneshwar Kumar †	India	2014	2024	145	49	24	213	27	0	0	8.52	99.53	3268	157	5/19	7.73	26.82	29	0
Eoin Morgan	England	2015	2016	16	15	2	310	63	0	2	23.85	121.09	0	–	–	–	–	8	0
Kane Williamson †	New Zealand	2015	2022	76	75	17	2101	89	0	18	36.22	126.03	18	0	0/7	10.33	–	39	0
Bipul Sharma	India	2015	2017	18	8	4	83	27*	0	0	20.75	162.75	224	9	2/13	8.04	33.33	3	0
Ravi Bopara	England	2015	2015	9	8	3	145	41	0	0	29.00	120.83	120	6	2/18	8.00	26.67	2	0
Trent Boult	New Zealand	2015	2016	8	0	0	–	–	0	0	–	–	192	10	3/19	8.59	27.50	3	0
Praveen Kumar	India	2015	2015	12	4	1	17	12	0	0	5.67	68.00	216	7	2/35	9.14	47.00	3	0
Aditya Tare ‡	India	2016	2016	3	2	0	8	8	0	0	4.00	53.33	0	–	–	–	–	1	0
Yuvraj Singh	India	2016	2017	22	21	3	488	70*	0	2	27.11	137.08	49	1	1/6	9.06	74.00	4	0
Ben Cutting	Australia	2016	2017	8	7	3	116	39*	0	0	29.00	193.33	143	6	2/20	8.52	33.83	2	0
Deepak Hooda	India	2016	2019	47	36	9	373	34	0	0	13.81	117.67	132	6	2/16	8.36	30.67	21	0
Mustafizur Rahman	Bangladesh	2016	2017	17	0	0	–	–	0	0	–	–	382	17	3/16	7.15	26.76	2	0
Barinder Sran	India	2016	2017	15	4	4	4	2*	0	0	–	100.00	309	14	3/28	8.58	31.57	2	0
Ashish Nehra	India	2016	2017	14	4	4	1	1*	0	0	–	100.00	283	17	3/15	8.40	23.29	2	0
Mohammad Nabi	Afghanistan	2017	2021	17	14	2	180	31	0	0	15.00	151.26	343	13	4/11	7.14	31.38	10	0
Rashid Khan	Afghanistan	2017	2021	76	35	11	222	34*	0	0	9.25	137.04	1812	93	3/7	6.33	20.56	20	0
Vijay Shankar	India	2017	2021	33	28	5	500	63*	0	2	21.74	120.19	193	8	2/19	7.83	31.50	15	0
Chris Jordan	England	2017	2018	2	1	0	0	0	0	0	0.00	0.00	30	1	1/9	8.00	40.00	0	0
Siddarth Kaul	India	2017	2021	43	9	5	11	7*	0	0	2.75	44.00	976	52	4/29	8.61	26.92	7	0
Mohammed Siraj	India	2017	2017	6	0	0	–	–	0	0	–	–	138	10	4/32	9.22	21.20	1	0
Ricky Bhui	India	2018	2019	2	2	0	7	7	0	0	3.50	41.18	0	–	–	–	–	0	0
Shreevats Goswami ‡	India	2018	2020	8	5	0	52	35	0	0	10.40	118.18	0	–	–	–	–	6	0
Alex Hales	England	2018	2018	6	6	0	148	45	0	0	24.67	125.42	0	–	–	–	–	2	0
Manish Pandey †	India	2018	2021	51	47	9	1345	83*	0	12	35.39	124.77	0	–	–	–	–	28	0
Wriddhiman Saha ‡	India	2018	2021	29	28	3	553	87	0	2	22.12	123.44	0	–	–	–	–	17	3
Carlos Brathwaite	West Indies	2018	2018	4	4	1	75	43*	0	0	25.00	156.25	61	5	2/15	9.25	18.80	2	0
Yusuf Pathan	India	2018	2019	25	21	9	300	45	0	0	25.00	122.45	18	1	1/14	7.33	22.00	4	0
Shakib Al Hasan	Bangladesh	2018	2019	20	14	2	248	35	0	0	20.67	119.81	407	16	2/18	8.12	34.44	3	0
Khaleel Ahmed	India	2018	2021	24	3	0	1	1	0	0	0.33	20.00	543	32	3/21	8.69	24.56	1	0
Basil Thampi	India	2018	2020	8	3	2	4	3	0	0	4.00	57.14	157	6	2/4	10.32	45.00	2	0
Sandeep Sharma	India	2018	2021	43	12	7	26	9	0	0	5.20	89.66	973	41	3/19	7.78	30.78	4	0
Billy Stanlake	Australia	2018	2018	4	1	1	5	5*	0	0	–	250.00	96	5	2/21	8.13	26.00	0	0
Jonny Bairstow ‡	England	2019	2021	28	28	3	1038	114	1	7	41.52	142.19	0	–	–	–	–	18	4
Martin Guptill	New Zealand	2019	2019	3	3	0	81	36	0	0	27.00	152.83	0	–	–	–	–	1	0
Abhishek Sharma §	India	2019	2026	76	73	5	1808	141	1	9	26.59	162.88	342	11	2/4	9.05	46.91	25	0
Shahbaz Nadeem	India	2019	2021	11	3	1	7	5	0	0	3.50	77.78	210	8	2/19	8.69	38.00	2	0
Abdul Samad	India	2020	2024	50	40	10	577	37*	0	0	19.23	146.08	54	2	1/9	12.56	56.50	27	0
Priyam Garg	India	2020	2022	21	17	1	251	51*	0	1	15.69	115.14	0	–	–	–	–	9	0
Mitchell Marsh	Australia	2020	2020	1	1	0	0	0	0	0	0.00	0.00	4	0	0/6	9.00	–	0	0
T. Natarajan	India	2020	2024	55	4	4	3	3*	0	0	–	60.00	1261	65	4/19	8.82	28.52	9	0
Jason Roy	England	2021	2021	5	5	0	150	60	0	1	30.00	123.97	0	–	–	–	–	3	0
Virat Singh	India	2021	2021	3	2	0	15	11	0	0	7.50	57.69	0	–	–	–	–	2	0
Kedar Jadhav	India	2021	2021	6	5	1	55	19	0	0	13.75	105.77	0	–	–	–	–	2	0
Mujeeb Ur Rahman	Afghanistan	2021	2021	1	1	1	1	1*	0	0	–	100.00	24	2	2/29	7.25	14.50	0	0
Jagadeesha Suchith	India	2021	2022	7	3	1	16	14*	0	0	8.00	114.29	150	7	2/12	8.24	29.43	2	0
Umran Malik	India	2021	2024	26	6	4	23	19*	0	0	11.50	143.75	493	29	5/25	9.40	26.62	6	0
Aiden Markram †	South Africa	2022	2024	38	36	8	849	68*	0	5	30.32	131.02	97	2	1/8	9.22	74.50	22	0
Nicholas Pooran ‡	West Indies	2022	2022	14	13	5	306	64*	0	2	38.25	144.34	0	–	–	–	–	8	1
Rahul Tripathi	India	2022	2024	33	33	4	851	76	0	5	29.34	144.48	0	–	–	–	–	10	0
Sean Abbott	Australia	2022	2022	1	1	0	7	7	0	0	7.00	140.00	24	1	1/47	11.75	47.00	1	0
Shreyas Gopal	India	2022	2022	1	1	1	9	9*	0	0	–	128.57	18	1	1/34	11.33	34.00	0	0
Marco Jansen	South Africa	2022	2024	19	11	6	66	17	0	0	13.20	104.76	414	18	3/25	9.71	37.22	12	0
Shashank Singh	India	2022	2022	10	5	1	69	25*	0	0	17.25	146.81	12	0	0/10	10.00	–	3	0
Romario Shepherd	West Indies	2022	2022	3	3	1	58	26*	0	0	29.00	141.46	54	3	2/42	10.89	32.67	0	0
Washington Sundar	India	2022	2024	18	14	2	161	40	0	0	13.42	123.85	304	10	3/28	9.04	45.80	3	0
Fazalhaq Farooqi	Afghanistan	2022	2023	7	2	2	3	2*	0	0	–	23.08	152	6	2/32	8.96	37.83	1	0
Kartik Tyagi	India	2022	2023	5	2	0	7	7	0	0	3.50	116.67	85	2	1/30	12.07	85.50	0	0
Mayank Agarwal	India	2023	2024	14	14	0	334	83	0	1	23.86	125.09	0	–	–	–	–	8	0
Anmolpreet Singh ‡	India	2023	2024	6	6	0	110	36	0	0	18.33	125.00	0	–	–	–	–	1	0
Harry Brook	England	2023	2023	11	11	2	190	100*	1	0	21.11	123.38	0	–	–	–	–	3	0
Heinrich Klaasen § ‡	South Africa	2023	2026	44	41	7	1497	105*	2	8	44.03	171.67	0	–	–	–	–	20	3
Nitish Kumar Reddy §	India	2023	2026	30	24	5	525	76*	0	2	27.63	132.91	163	7	2/17	10.67	41.43	13	0
Glenn Phillips	New Zealand	2023	2023	5	5	0	39	25	0	0	7.80	177.27	18	1	1/10	6.67	20.00	1	0
Sanvir Singh	India	2023	2024	6	5	3	25	8*	0	0	12.50	119.05	0	–	–	–	–	3	0
Vivrant Sharma	India	2023	2023	3	1	0	69	69	0	1	69.00	146.81	18	0	0/18	12.33	–	0	0
Mayank Dagar	India	2023	2023	3	0	0	–	–	0	0	–	–	66	1	1/37	7.55	83.00	0	0
Akeal Hosein	West Indies	2023	2023	1	1	1	16	16*	0	0	–	160.00	24	1	1/40	10.00	40.00	0	0
Mayank Markande	India	2023	2024	17	3	3	21	18*	0	0	–	161.54	360	20	4/15	9.32	27.95	3	0
Adil Rashid	England	2023	2023	2	2	0	22	18	0	0	11.00	137.50	42	2	2/23	8.00	28.00	0	0
Travis Head §	Australia	2024	2026	30	29	1	998	102	1	7	35.64	179.50	10	0	0/32	19.20	–	3	0
Shahbaz Ahmed	India	2024	2024	16	12	3	215	59*	0	1	23.89	129.52	165	7	3/23	9.82	38.57	3	0
Pat Cummins § †	Australia	2024	2025	30	19	9	233	35*	0	0	23.30	152.29	664	34	3/19	9.18	29.88	12	0
Jaydev Unadkat §	India	2024	2026	20	6	3	28	8*	0	0	9.33	96.55	366	23	3/21	8.92	23.65	5	0
Vijayakanth Viyaskanth	Sri Lanka	2024	2024	3	1	1	7	7*	0	0	–	140.00	60	1	1/37	8.60	86.00	2	0
Ishan Kishan § † ‡	India	2025	2026	16	15	4	448	106*	1	2	37.33	160.57	1	0	0/4	24.00	–	9	0
Aniket Verma §	India	2025	2026	16	14	3	280	74	0	1	25.45	170.73	0	–	–	–	–	7	0
Harsh Dubey §	India	2025	2026	5	2	1	12	9*	0	0	12.00	200.00	90	7	3/34	10.00	21.43	2	0
Abhinav Manohar	India	2025	2025	8	5	0	61	43	0	0	12.20	100.00	0	–	–	–	–	7	0
Kamindu Mendis §	Sri Lanka	2025	2025	5	5	2	92	32*	0	0	30.67	133.33	42	2	1/4	8.57	30.00	1	0
Atharva Taide	India	2025	2025	1	1	0	13	13	0	0	13.00	144.44	0	–	–	–	–	0	0
Wiaan Mulder	South Africa	2025	2025	1	1	0	9	9	0	0	9.00	81.82	6	0	0/16	16.00	–	1	0
Rahul Chahar	India	2025	2025	1	0	0	–	–	0	0	–	–	6	0	0/9	9.00	–	0	0
Eshan Malinga §	Sri Lanka	2025	2026	9	0	0	–	–	0	0	–	–	184	15	3/31	9.36	19.13	5	0
Mohammed Shami	India	2025	2025	9	4	3	10	6*	0	0	10.00	100.00	180	6	2/28	11.23	56.17	2	0
Harshal Patel §	India	2025	2026	14	5	2	21	12*	0	0	7.00	75.00	279	16	4/28	10.09	29.31	3	0
Simarjeet Singh	India	2025	2025	4	3	1	3	3*	0	0	1.50	42.86	60	2	2/46	14.10	70.50	0	0
Zeeshan Ansari §	India	2025	2025	10	0	0	–	–	0	0	–	–	203	6	3/42	9.84	55.50	4	0
Adam Zampa	Australia	2025	2025	2	0	0	–	–	0	0	–	–	48	2	1/46	11.75	47.00	0	0
David Payne §	England	2026	2026	2	1	1	6	6*	0	0	–	120.00	30	2	2/35	14.00	35.00	0	0
Salil Arora §	India	2026	2026	2	2	0	9	9	0	0	4.50	128.57	0	–	–	–	–	0	0
Shivang Kumar §	India	2026	2026	1	1	0	4	4	0	0	4.00	200.00	24	0	0/41	10.25	–	0	0

Last updated: 5 April 2026 (Note: Statistics updated as of the 2026 Indian Premier League.)

== Captains ==
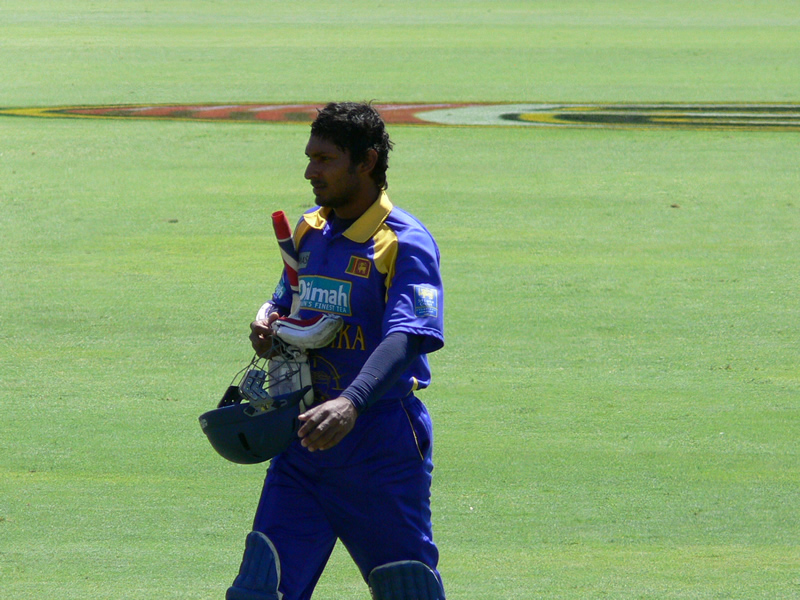
Kumar Sangakkara was the first captain of the SRH

The Sunrisers Hyderabad announced Kumar Sangakkara as the captain for their first IPL campaign but had to replace him with Cameron White during the season owing to the former's poor form. Shikhar Dhawan was made the captain during the 2013 Champions League Twenty20 and also led the team initially during the 2014 IPL season. Dhawan was eventually replaced by Darren Sammy during the season to relieve Dhawan from the captaincy pressure and improve his batting performances. They changed their captain for the fifth time in three seasons appointing David Warner for the 2015 season who proved to be their most successful captain by winning their first IPL title in the 2016 season. Warner resigned as the captain in the aftermath of a ball-tampering scandal before the 2018 season and was replaced by Kane Williamson. Bhuvneshwar Kumar stood-in as the captain at the start of the 2019 season when Williamson was unavailable owing to an injury. Warner was reinstated as the captain of the Sunrisers replacing Williamson ahead of the 2020 season but Warner's lack of form led Williamson to be reinstated as captain during the 2021 season. Manish Pandey captained last match of the 2021 season with Warner, Williamson and Kumar rested for that match. Williamson continued as the captain for the 2022 season except for the last match which he missed due to the personal issues in which Kumar stood-in as the captain. Australia's World Cup-winning captain Pat Cummins will lead the Sunrisers Hyderabad team in the upcoming Indian Premier League.

SRH captains
Name	Nat	From	To	Mat	Won	Lost	Tie	NR	Win% (Note: Games that did not have a result are included in calculating the win percentage.) (Note: The Win–loss percentage is calculated using the formula: $\frac{Wins+\frac{1}{2}Ties}{Games}$)
Kumar Sangakkara	Sri Lanka	2013	2013	9	4	4	1	0	50.00
Cameron White	Australia	2013	2013	8	5	3	0	0	62.50
Shikhar Dhawan (Note: includes matches when Shikhar Dhawan led the team during the 2013 CLT20.)	India	2013	2014	16	7	9	0	0	43.75
Darren Sammy	West Indies	2014	2014	4	2	2	0	0	50.00
David Warner	Australia	2015	2021	67	35	30	2	0	53.73
Kane Williamson	New Zealand	2018	2022	46	22	23	1	0	48.91
Bhuvneshwar Kumar	India	2019	2022	7	2	5	0	0	28.57
Manish Pandey	India	2021	2021	1	0	1	0	0	0.00
Aiden Markram	South Africa	2023	2023	14	4	10	0	0	28.57
Pat Cummins	Australia	2024	Present						

Last updated: 12 April 2024

== See also ==
- Sunrisers Hyderabad
- List of Sunrisers Hyderabad records
