= 2018 Indian Premier League final =

- Match programme cover
- Event: 2018 Indian Premier League
Sunrisers Hyderabad	Chennai Super Kings
178/6	181/2
20 overs	18.1 overs
- Chennai Super Kings won by 8 wickets
- Date: 27 May 2018
- Venue: Wankhede Stadium, Mumbai
- Player of the match: Shane Watson (CSK)
- Umpires: Marais Erasmus (SA); Sundaram Ravi (Ind)
- Attendance: 33,415

The 2018 Indian Premier League final was a day/night Twenty20 cricket match played between Sunrisers Hyderabad and Chennai Super Kings, on 27 May 2018 at the Wankhede Stadium, Mumbai. It was to determine the winner of the 2018 season of the Indian Premier League, an annual Twenty20 tournament in India. For the first time in the history of IPL, the final was played on 19:00 IST, with all the finals of previous ten seasons played at 20:00 IST.

Chennai defeated Hyderabad by 8 wickets to win their third IPL title. Shane Watson of Chennai won the player of the match award for his innings of 117 not out off 57 balls.

== Road to the final ==
=== League stage ===
Chennai Super Kings			vs	Sunrisers Hyderabad
League Stage
Opponent	Scorecard	Result	Titles	Opponent	Scorecard	Result
Mumbai Indians	7 April 2018	Won	Match 1	Rajasthan Royals	9 April 2018	Won
Kolkata Knight Riders	10 April 2018	Won	Match 2	Mumbai Indians	12 April 2018	Won
Kings XI Punjab	15 April 2018	Lost	Match 3	Kolkata Knight Riders	14 April 2018	Won
Rajasthan Royals	20 April 2018	Won	Match 4	Kings XI Punjab	19 April 2018	Lost
Sunrisers Hyderabad	22 April 2018	Won	Match 5	Chennai Super Kings	22 April 2018	Lost
Royal Challengers	25 April 2018	Won	Match 6	Mumbai Indians	24 April 2018	Won
Mumbai Indians	28 April 2018	Lost	Match 7	Kings XI Punjab	26 April 2018	Won
Delhi Daredevils	30 April 2018	Won	Match 8	Rajasthan Royals	29 April 2018	Won
Kolkata Knight Riders	3 May 2018	Lost	Match 9	Delhi Daredevils	5 May 2018	Won
Royal Challengers	5 May 2018	Won	Match 10	Royal Challengers	7 May 2018	Won
Rajasthan Royals	11 May 2018	Lost	Match 11	Delhi Daredevils	10 May 2018	Won
Sunrisers Hyderabad	13 May 2018	Won	Match 12	Chennai Super Kings	13 May 2018	Lost
Delhi Daredevils	18 May 2018	Lost	Match 13	Royal Challengers	17 May 2018	Lost
Kings XI Punjab	20 May 2018	Won	Match 14	Kolkata Knight Riders	19 May 2018	Lost
Playoff stage
Qualifier 1				Qualifier 1
Opponent	Scorecard	Result	Titles	Opponent	Scorecard	Result
Sunrisers Hyderabad	22 May 2018	Won	Match 15	Chennai Super Kings	22 May 2018	Lost
				Qualifier 2
				Opponent	Scorecard	Result
			Match 16	Kolkata Knight Riders	25 May 2018	Won
2018 IPL Final

=== League Meet-ups ===
No.	Teams	Venue	Winner	Margin	Man of the Match
1	CSK vs SRH	Hyderabad	CSK	4 runs	Ambati Rayudu – CSK – 79 (37)
2	CSK vs SRH	Pune	CSK	8 wickets	Ambati Rayudu – CSK – 100* (62)
3	CSK vs SRH	Mumbai	CSK	2 wickets	Faf du Plessis – CSK – 67* (42)

== Details ==
Shane Watson single-handedly won it for CSK by hitting a magnificent century in the biggest game of the season. He made 117 runs. He had scored a century in the earlier stage of the tournament. Ambati Rayudu hit the winning runs for CSK. SRH bowlers looked out of form, with Bhuvneshwar Kumar and Rashid Khan posing as a threat for CSK as all the other bowlers leaked runs heavily. With this win, CSK lifted the IPL trophy for the 3rd time in their seventh appearance in an IPL final.

=== SRH Innings ===
After a slow start, opening batsmanShikhar Dhawan tried to up the ante against the strict bowling. Uncapped Bowler and Former SRH player Karn Sharma was introduced into the attack in the 7th over. Both Dhawan and captain Williamson were keeping it slow and steady going for a boundary every over. SRH could only add 18 runs in the last 2 overs. SRH had posted a total of 178/6 which was just about par.

=== CSK Innings ===
Faf du Plessis and Shane Watson opened the innings for CSK while Bhuvneshwar Kumar bowled the first over for his team. The Super Kings lost du Plessis early but Watson and Raina did not give the Sunrisers any chance to bounce back with their 117-run partnership. Though Watson started slowly playing out Bhuvneshwar's overs, he pummeled the other Sunrisers bowlers to reach his second century in the IPL season. After Raina's departure, Rayudu joined hands with Watson to complete the chase for the Super Kings and helped them lift their third IPL trophy.

== Result ==
- On-field umpires: Marais Erasmus (SA) and Sundaram Ravi (Ind)
- Third umpire: Nitin Menon (Ind)
- Reserve umpire: Yeshwant Barde (Ind)
- Match referee: Andy Pycroft (Zim)
- Toss: Chennai Super Kings won the toss and elected to field.

Hyderabad Batting

Batting	Dismissal	Runs	Balls	4s	6s	SR
Shreevats Goswami (wk)	run out (K Sharma	5	5	0	0	100
Shikhar Dhawan	b Jadeja	26	25	2	1	104
Kane Williamson (C)	st Dhoni b K Sharma	47	36	5	2	130.55
Shakib Al Hasan	c Raina b Bravo	23	15	2	1	153.33
Yusuf Pathan	Not out	45	25	4	2	180
Deepak Hooda	c sub (Shorey) b Lungi	3	4	0	0	75
Carlos Brathwaite	c Rayudu b Thakur	21	11	0	3	190.90
Rashid Khan	Did not Bat	-	-	-	-	-
Bhuvneshwar Kumar	Did not Bat	-	-	-	-	-
Siddarth Kaul	Did not Bat	-	-	-	-	-
Sandeep Sharma	Did not Bat	-	-	-	-	-
Extras (8)	(B: 0, LB: 1, NB: 1, WD: 6, P: 0)					
Total	178/6 (20.0)RR: 8.9					

Chennai Bowling

Player	Overs	M	Runs	Wickets	No Ball	WD	E/R
Deepak Chahar	4	0	25	0	1	1	6.25
Lungi Ngidi	4	1	26	1	0	0	6.5
Shardul Thakur	3	0	31	1	0	2	10.33
Karn Sharma	3	0	25	1	0	1	8.33
Dwayne Bravo	4	0	46	1	0	2	11.5
Ravindra Jadeja	2	0	24	1	0	0	12

Chennai Batting

Batting	Dismissal	Runs	Balls	4s	6s	SR
Shane Watson	Not out	117	57	11	8	205.26
Faf du Plessis	c & b Sandeep	10	11	1	0	90.90
Suresh Raina	c Goswami b Brathwaite	32	24	3	1	133.33
Ambati Rayudu	Not out	16	19	1	1	84.21
MS Dhoni (C) (wk)	Did not Bat	-	-	-		-
Dwayne Bravo	Did not Bat	-	-	-		-
Ravindra Jadeja	Did not Bat	-	-	-		-
Deepak Chahar	Did not Bat	-	-	-		-
Karn Sharma	Did not Bat	-	-	-		-
Shardul Thakur	Did not Bat	-	-	-		-
Lungi Ngidi	Did not Bat	-	-	-		-
Extras (6)	(B: 0, LB: 3, NB: 0, WD: 3, P: 0)					
Total	181/2 (18.3)RR: 9.78					

Hyderabad Bowling

Player	Overs	M	Runs	Wickets	No Ball	WD	E/R
Bhuvneshwar Kumar	4	1	17	0	0	0	4.25
Sandeep Sharma	4	0	52	1	0	2	13
Siddarth Kaul	3	0	43	0	0	0	14.33
Rashid Khan	4	1	24	0	0	0	6
Shakib Al Hasan	1	0	15	0	0	0	15
Carlos Brathwaite	2.3	0	27	1	0	1	10.8
