= New Zealand 'A' cricket team in India in 2017 =

Cricket tournament

	India 'A'	New Zealand 'A'
- Dates: 23 September 2017 – 15 October 2017
Captains	Karun Nair (Tests); Shreyas Iyer (First 3 ODIs); Rishabh Pant (Last 2 ODIs)	Henry Nicholls

FC series
- Result: India 'A' won the 2-match series 2–0
Most runs	Shreyas Iyer (190)	Jeet Raval (150)
Most wickets	Karn Sharma (16)	Ish Sodhi (8)

LA series
- Result: India 'A' won the 5-match series 3–0
Most runs	Abhimanyu Easwaran (132)	George Worker (175)
Most wickets	Karn Sharma (9)	Scott Kuggeleijn (7)

The New Zealand A cricket team toured India in September and October 2017. On this tour they played two first-class matches and five limited-overs matches against the India A team. New Zealand A was captained by Henry Nicholls. The two first-class matches were played at the ACA–KDCA Cricket Ground and the limited overs matches at ACA–VDCA Cricket Stadium in Visakhapatnam.

== Squads ==
Test cricket		One Day Internationals (ODIs)	
India A	New Zealand A	India A	New Zealand A
Karun Nair (c); Priyank Panchal; Ravikumar Samarth; Sudip Chatterjee; Shreyas Iyer; Ankit Bawne; Hanuma Vihari; ~~Rishabh Pant~~ (wk); Shahbaz Nadeem; Krishnappa Gowtham; Navdeep Saini; Shardul Thakur; Mohammed Siraj; Ankit Rajpoot; Parthiv Patel (wk)	Henry Nicholls (c); Todd Astle; Tom Blundell; Tom Bruce; Lockie Ferguson; Matt Henry; Scott Kuggeleijn; Colin Munro; Glenn Phillips (wk); Seth Rance; Jeet Raval; Tim Seifert (wk); Ish Sodhi; Sean Solia; George Worker; Will Young	Shreyas Iyer (c, first 3 ODIs); Prithvi Shaw; Mayank Agarwal; Deepak Hooda; Shubham Gill; Shreevats Goswami (wk, first 3 ODIs); Shahbaz Nadeem; Karn Sharma; Vijay Shankar; Shardul Thakur; Siddarth Kaul; Mohammed Siraj; Basil Thampi; Rishabh Pant (c, wk, for last 2 ODIs); Abhimanyu Easwaran; Prashant Chopra; Ankit Bawne; Baba Aparajith	Henry Nicholls (c); Todd Astle; Tom Blundell; Tom Bruce; Lockie Ferguson; Matt Henry; Scott Kuggeleijn; Colin Munro; Glenn Phillips (wk); Seth Rance; Tim Seifert (wk); Ish Sodhi; Colin de Grandhomme; George Worker; Will Young

Parthiv Patel replaced Rishabh Pant for the second Test due to Pant's injury. Colin de Grandhomme replaced Sean Solia for the ODI series.

== First-class series ==
=== 1st unofficial Test ===
23–26 September 2017
Scorecard

New Zealand A	v	India A
147 (63 overs); Tim Seifert 35* (114); Shahbaz Nadeem 4/39 (23 overs)		320 (67.2 overs); Shreyas Iyer 108 (97); Ish Sodhi 5/94 (22 overs)
142 (63.1 overs); George Worker 35 (112); Shahbaz Nadeem 4/51 (20.1 overs)

India 'A' won by an innings and 31 runs.
ACA–KDCA Cricket Ground, Vijayawada
Umpires: Chirra Ravikanthreddy and Krishnamachari Srinivasan

- New Zealand 'A' won the toss and elected to bat.

=== 2nd unofficial Test ===
30 September – 3 October 2017
Scorecard

New Zealand A	v	India A
211 (69.5 overs); Colin Munro 65(82); Shardul Thakur 3/34 (12 overs)		447 (110 overs); Ankit Bawne 163(245); Ish Sodhi 3/120(25 overs)
210 (79.3 overs); Henry Nicholls 94(190); Karn Sharma 5/78 (20.3 overs)

India 'A' won by an innings and 26 runs.
ACA–KDCA Cricket Ground, Vijayawada
Umpires: Saiyed Khalid and Nitin Pandit

- New Zealand 'A' won the toss and elected to bat.

== Unofficial ODI Series ==
=== 1st Unofficial ODI ===
6 October
Scorecard

India A	v	New Zealand A

Match abandoned without a ball being bowled
Dr. Y. S. Rajasekhara Reddy ACA–VDCA Cricket Stadium, Visakhapatnam
Umpires: Rohan Pandit (Ind) and Sadashiv Iyer (Ind)

- no toss

=== 2nd Unofficial ODI ===
10 October
Scorecard

New Zealand A 269/6 (42 overs)	v	India A 269/9 (42 overs)
Glenn Phillips 140 (130); Siddarth Kaul 3/65 (9 overs)		Shreyas Iyer 90 (73); Todd Astle 4/22 (9 overs)

Match Tied.
Dr. Y. S. Rajasekhara Reddy ACA–VDCA Cricket Stadium, Visakhapatnam

- India 'A' won the toss and elected to bowl
- Match Reduced to 42 overs per-side due to wet outfield

=== 3rd Unofficial ODI ===
11 October
13:30
Scorecard

New Zealand A 143 (37.1 overs)	v	India A 144/4 (24.4 overs)
Henry Nicholls 35 (51); Karn Sharma 5/22 (8 overs)		Vijay Shankar 47*(42); Ish Sodhi 2/31 (5 overs)

India A won by 6 wickets.
Dr. Y. S. Rajasekhara Reddy ACA–VDCA Cricket Stadium, Visakhapatnam
Umpires: Rohan Pandit and Puttarangaiah Jayapal
Player of the match: Karn Sharma (India A)

- New Zealand A won the toss and elected to bat.

=== 4th Unofficial ODI ===
13 October
09:00
Scorecard

India A 289/6 (50 overs)	v	New Zealand A 225 (45.1 overs)
Abhimanyu Easwaran 83 (104); Scott Kuggeleijn 2/37 (9 overs)		George Worker 108 (113); Shahbaz Nadeem 4/33 (9.1 overs)

India A won by 64 runs.
Dr. Y. S. Rajasekhara Reddy ACA–VDCA Cricket Stadium, Visakhapatnam
Umpires: Rohan Pandit and Puttarangaiah Jayapal
Player of the match: Shahbaz Nadeem (India A)

- India A won the toss and elected to bat.

=== 5th Unofficial ODI ===
15 October
09:00
Scorecard

New Zealand A 173 (44.2 overs)	v	India A 174/7 (32.1 overs)
Henry Nicholls 40 (72); Basil Thampi 3/19 (6 overs)		Abhimanyu Easwaran 49 (51); Lockie Ferguson 3/24 (6.1 overs)

India A won by 3 wickets
Dr. Y. S. Rajasekhara Reddy ACA–VDCA Cricket Stadium, Visakhapatnam
Umpires: Sadashiv Iyer (Ind) and Puttarangaiah Jayapal (Ind)
Player of the match: Basil Thampi (India A)

- New Zealand A won the toss and elected to bat.

== See also ==
- New Zealand cricket team in India in 2017–18
