= Bipul Sharma =

Indian cricketer (born 1983)

Personal information
- Full name: Bipul Sharma
- Born: 28 September 1983 (age 43); Amritsar, Punjab, India
- Batting: Left-handed
- Bowling: Slow left-arm orthodox
- Role: All-rounder

Domestic team information
- Years: Team
- 2003/04–2012/13: Punjab
- 2007–2009: Chandigarh Lions
- 2010–2013: Kings XI Punjab
- 2013/14–2017/18: Himachal Pradesh
- 2015–2018: Sunrisers Hyderabad
- 2018/19: Sikkim
- 2019-present: Chandigarh

Career statistics
Competition	FC	List A	T20
Matches	50	82	88
Runs scored	2,514	1,504	871
Batting average	42.61	32.69	21.24
100s/50s	6/14	1/8	0/2
Top score	176	100	79*
Balls bowled	8,432	3,572	1,404
Wickets	115	85	65
Bowling average	30.69	28.81	23.24
5 wickets in innings	2	1	0
10 wickets in match	0	0	0
Best bowling	7/72	5/36	4/28
Catches/stumpings	18/–	36/–	28/–
- Source: ESPNcricinfo, 24 April 2015

Bipul Sharma (born 28 September 1983) is an Indian first-class cricketer who plays for Chandigarh in domestic cricket. He is an all-rounder who bats left-handed and bowls slow left-arm orthodox.

He was originally signed by IPL team Kings XI Punjab for the 2010 season and he spent 4 years as a back-up player for the franchise making 15 appearances in total including just a single outing during the 2013 campaign. He was dropped from their roster for the 2014 season.

It looked likely that Sharma would go without an IPL team again for 2015 season before an injury Laxmi Shulka saw Sunrisers Hyderabad bring him in as a late replacement.

While Sharma again received limited playing time while at Sunrisers Hyderabad he did appear in all 3 knockout games of their title winning campaign in the 2016 IPL. His performances included 27 off 11 balls in the eliminator against Kolkata Knight Riders as well as taking the crucial wicket of AB de Villiers in the final itself.

Bipul Sharma finished his IPL career with a record low dot ball percentage (26.83%).

In 2020, he signed a contract to play for Formby in the Liverpool League, UK. The contract was later delayed as a result of the COVID-19 pandemic but Sharma is due to appear for them in the summer of 2021.
