= Shreevats Goswami =

Indian cricketer

Personal information
- Full name: Shreevats Pratyush Goswami
- Born: 18 May 1989 (age 37); Kolkata, West Bengal, India
- Batting: Left-handed
- Bowling: Right-arm medium
- Role: Wicket-keeper-batsman

Domestic team information
- Years: Team
- 2009–2022: Bengal
- 2008–2010: Royal Challengers Bangalore
- 2011: Kolkata Knight Riders
- 2012–2014: Rajasthan Royals (squad no. 63)
- 2018–2021: Sunrisers Hyderabad (squad no. 3)
- 2022-2023: Mizoram

Career statistics
Competition	FC	LA	T20
Matches	61	97	111
Runs scored	3,019	3,371	2,437
Batting average	32.46	37.45	26.78
100s/50s	4/17	6/18	0/13
Top score	225*	149*	86*
Catches/stumpings	143/1	79/9	52/10
- Source: ESPNcricinfo, 25 March 2025

Shreevats Goswami (born 18 May 1989) is an Indian cricketer. He is a left-handed batsman and wicketkeeper. He was born in Liluah in Howrah, the twin city of Kolkata, West Bengal. He started playing cricket at the age of 11. He played domestic cricket for Under-19 Bengal. During the Under-19 Tri-nation series in South Africa in January 2008, he scored 97 against South Africa and 104 against Bangladesh. In the 2008 U/19 Cricket World Cup in Malaysia, he scored 58 runs in one of the league matches and 51 in the semi-final against New Zealand.

Goswami has played for Royal Challengers Bangalore in the first three seasons of the Indian Premier League and was named as the emerging player of the tournament in 2008. In the 4th edition of IPL, Goswami was kept in the uncapped player pool and was signed by the Kolkata Knight Riders. In 5th edition of IPL, he moved to the Rajasthan Royals.

Goswami toiled hard in the domestic circuit for Bengal but Wriddhiman Saha's presence meant that he was always the reserve keeper. Despite this, he managed to surpass 8000 domestic runs and 200 dismissals. In 2016-17, he had a really good Ranji Trophy season and registered his career best score of 227 against Madhya Pradesh, which is highest by a Bengal keeper.

He was selected for the Board President's XI side for playing a practice match against Australia in September 2017 where he was top scorer with 44 runs. His good performances has also earned him a spot for India A's ODI series against New Zealand A but got limited opportunities.

In January 2018, he was bought by the Sunrisers Hyderabad and retained by the side for three years.
