= 2019–20 Ranji Trophy Plate Group =

Cricket tournament

- The Ranji Trophy, awarded to the winners
- Dates: 9 December 2019 – 15 February 2020
- Administrator(s): BCCI
- Cricket format: First-class cricket
- Tournament format(s): Round-robin
- Host(s): India
- Participants: 10

The 2019–20 Ranji Trophy was the 86th season of the Ranji Trophy, the first-class cricket tournament that took place in India. It was contested by 38 teams, divided into four groups, with ten teams in the Plate Group. The group stage ran from 9 December 2019 to 15 February 2020. The top team in the Plate Group progressed to the quarter-finals of the competition.

In January 2020, in the round six fixture between Meghalaya and Manipur, Manipur were bowled out for only 27 runs in their first innings. On 12 February 2020, the fixture between Chandigarh and Manipur was the 60,000th first-class cricket match to be played.

In the final round of matches, Goa qualified from the Plate Group, after beating Mizoram inside two days.

== Points table ==
Team	Pld	W	L	D	T	NR	Pts	Quot
Goa	9	7	0	2	0	0	50	2.343
Pondicherry	9	7	1	1	0	0	48	2.336
Chandigarh	9	4	0	5	0	0	43	3.498
Meghalaya	9	5	3	1	0	0	34	1.302
Bihar	9	3	1	5	0	0	30	1.191
Nagaland	9	2	3	4	0	0	19	0.765
Manipur	9	2	7	0	0	0	12	0.397
Mizoram	9	1	6	2	0	0	12	0.424
Sikkim	9	1	5	3	0	0	11	0.705
Arunachal Pradesh	9	0	6	3	0	0	3	0.458

- Top team advances to the knockout stage and gets promoted to Elite Group C for the next season.

== Fixtures ==
=== Round 1 ===
9–12 December 2019
Scorecard

Bihar	v	Pondicherry
173 (68.3 overs); Shasheem Rathour 31 (86); Sagar Udeshi 6/50 (28 overs)		300 (79.3 overs); Paras Dogra 70 (74); Vivek Kumar 5/51 (19 overs)
196 (71.4 overs); Vikash Ranjan 85* (172); Vinay Kumar 4/57 (19.4 overs)		70/0 (11.2 overs); Paras Dogra 42* (40)

Pondicherry won by 10 wickets
Moin-ul-Haq Stadium, Patna
Umpires: Akshay Totre and Belur Ravi
Player of the match: Sagar Udeshi (Pondicherry)

- Pondicherry won the toss and elected to field.
- Nishant Kumar, Shivam Kumar, Sabir Khan (Bihar), Ashith Rajiv and A Aravinddaraj (Pondicherry) all made their first-class debuts.
- Vinay Kumar (Pondicherry) took his 400th wicket in the Ranji Trophy.

9–12 December 2019
Scorecard

Arunachal Pradesh	v	Chandigarh
147 (44.2 overs); Techi Neri 45 (75); Shresth Nirmohi 5/26 (11.2 overs)		503/2d (76 overs); Arslan Khan 233* (236); Techi Doria 1/33 (3 overs)
183 (54.3 overs); Rahul Dalal 81 (94); Gurinder Singh 6/50 (14.3 overs)

Chandigarh won by an innings and 173 runs
Sector 16 Stadium, Chandigarh
Umpires: Krishnaraj Srinath and Tapan Sharma
Player of the match: Arslan Khan (Chandigarh)

- Chandigarh won the toss and elected to field.
- Arslan Khan, Shivam Bhambri, Raman Bishnoi (Chandigarh), Kengo Bam, Yab Niya and Karkir Taye (Arunachal Pradesh) all made their first-class debuts.
- Arslan Khan scored the first century by a batsman for Chandigarh in first-class cricket, and went on to score his maiden double century in first-class cricket.

9–12 December 2019
Scorecard

Sikkim	v	Goa
136 (58.2 overs); Lee Yong Lepcha 56 (117); Lakshay Garg 3/23 (13 overs)		436/6d (105.4 overs); Snehal Kauthankar 134 (239); Ishwar Chaudhary 2/96 (24 overs)
374 (111.3 overs); Iqbal Abdulla 135 (158); Felix Alemao 3/76 (24 overs)		75/1 (18.2 overs); Suyash Prabhudessai 49* (47); Iqbal Abdulla 1/23 (9 overs)

Goa won by 9 wickets
Goa Cricket Association Academy Ground, Porvorim
Umpires: GS Ananth Ramakrishnan and Rajesh Timaney
Player of the match: Suyash Prabhudessai (Goa)

- Goa won the toss and elected to field.
- Aditya Kaushik (Goa) and Bhushan Subba (Sikkim) both made their first-class debuts.

9–12 December 2019
Scorecard

Mizoram	v	Manipur
65 (16 overs); Taruwar Kohli 34 (35); Rex Rajkumar 8/22 (8 overs)		289 (80.1 overs); Bonny Chingangbam 89 (161); Bobby Zothansanga 5/92 (27 overs)
290 (75.1 overs); KB Pawan 124* (172); Langlonyamba Keishangbam 2/16 (5.1 overs)		69/4 (17.5 overs); Jayanta Sagatpam 16* (29); Taruwar Kohli 2/26 (6 overs)

Manipur won by 6 wickets
Videocon Academy Ground, Kolkata
Umpires: Mukund Mandale and Madanagopal Kuppuraj
Player of the match: Rex Rajkumar (Manipur)

- Manipur won the toss and elected to field.
- Langlonyamba Keishangbam, Al Bashid Muhammed, Ajay Lamabam (Manipur) and Parvez Ahmed (Mizoram) all made their first-class debuts.

9–12 December 2019
Scorecard

Meghalaya	v	Nagaland
285 (96.5 overs); Puneet Bisht 125 (145); Imliwati Lemtur 7/53 (32 overs)		136 (45.1 overs); Nagaho Chishi 33* (34); Sanjay Yadav 9/52 (22 overs)
142 (48.1 overs); Dipu Sangma 36* (70); Imliwati Lemtur 6/54 (21 overs)		181 (62 overs); Aosashi Longchar 44 (76); Sanjay Yadav 4/60 (29 overs)

Meghalaya won by 110 runs
Nagaland Cricket Stadium, Dimapur
Umpires: Sanjay Kumar Singh and Nikhil Patwardhan
Player of the match: Puneet Bisht (Meghalaya)

- Nagaland won the toss and elected to field.
- Aosashi Longchar, Bohoto Yeptho, Nagaho Chishi (Nagaland), Wallam Kynshi, Sanjay Yadav and Akash Choudhary (Meghalaya) all made their first-class debuts.
- Sanjay Yadav (Meghalaya) took the third-best figures in Indian domestic first-class cricket.

=== Round 2 ===
17–20 December 2019
Scorecard

Sikkim	v	Pondicherry
65 (31.3 overs); Bibek Diyali 22 (51); Sagar Trivedi 5/20 (8.3 overs)		446/8d (88.4 overs); Paras Dogra 117 (140); Ishwar Chaudhary 5/145 (28.4 overs)
112 (43 overs); Bibek Diyali 24 (68); Sagar Udeshi 4/21 (8 overs)

Pondicherry won by an innings and 269 runs
Cricket Association Pondicherry Ground 2, Puducherry
Umpires: Saiyed Khalid and Kamlesh Sharma
Player of the match: Sagar Trivedi (Pondicherry)

- Pondicherry won the toss and elected to field.
- Sagar Trivedi (Pondicherry) made his first-class debut.

17–20 December 2019
Scorecard

Meghalaya	v	Goa
203 (68.4 overs); Dwaraka Ravi Teja 81 (148); Darshan Misal 3/16 (8 overs)		463 (143.5 overs); Snehal Kauthankar 179 (287); Abhay Negi 5/90 (29 overs)
252 (81 overs); Puneet Bisht 51 (86); Amit Verma 6/72 (27 overs)

Goa won by an innings and 8 runs
Goa Cricket Association Academy Ground, Porvorim
Umpires: Abhijit Bengeri and Navdeep Singh
Player of the match: Snehal Kauthankar (Goa)

- Goa won the toss and elected to field.

17–20 December 2019
Scorecard

Manipur	v	Nagaland
116 (50.1 overs); Kangabam Singh 44 (108); Imliwati Lemtur 7/25 (17 overs)		400 (95.2 overs); Shrikant Mundhe 148 (242); Sultan Karim 3/87 (20 overs)
216 (79.2 overs); Narisingh Yadav 85 (115); Stuart Binny 3/64 (22 overs)

Nagaland won by an innings and 68 runs
Videocon Academy Ground, Kolkata
Umpires: Sivasubramaniyan Shankar and Belur Ravi
Player of the match: Imliwati Lemtur (Nagaland)

- Manipur won the toss and elected to bat.
- Thomas Moirangthem (Manipur) made his first-class debut.

17–20 December 2019
Scorecard

Arunachal Pradesh	v	Mizoram
344 (92 overs); Rahul Dalal 179 (179); Bobby Zothansanga 4/62 (18 overs)		620/9d (142 overs); Taruwar Kohli 307* (408); Akhilesh Sahani 4/175 (38 overs)
417/5 (103.5 overs); Rahul Dalal 205* (272); Pratik Desai 2/111 (27 overs)

Match drawn
Cricket Association Pondicherry Siechem Ground, Puducherry
Umpires: Pranav Joshi and Arun Kumar Basa
Player of the match: Taruwar Kohli (Mizoram)

- Arunachal Pradesh won the toss and elected to bat.
- Taruwar Kohli (Mizoram) scored his second triple century in the Ranji Trophy.

17–20 December 2019
Scorecard

Chandigarh	v	Bihar
420 (116.5 overs); Ankit Kaushik 117 (205); Ashutosh Aman 5/71 (33 overs)		115 (49.3 overs); Babul Kumar 67 (143); Gurinder Singh 6/24 (12.3 overs)
		175/6 (71 overs) (f/o); Nishant Kumar 70 (115); Gurinder Singh 3/68 (25 overs)

Match drawn
Sector 16 Stadium, Chandigarh
Umpires: Saurabh Dhote and Sadashiv Iyer
Player of the match: Gurinder Singh (Chandigarh)

- Bihar won the toss and elected to field.
- Anirudh Kanwar (Chandigarh) and Shashi Shekhar (Bihar) both made their first-class debuts.
- Ankit Kaushik (Chandigarh) scored his maiden century in first-class cricket.

=== Round 3 ===
25–28 December 2019
Scorecard

Mizoram	v	Pondicherry
73 (27.4 overs); Lalhruaizela 20 (29); Sagar Udeshi 4/6 (7.4 overs)		458/5d (86 overs); Paras Dogra 200 (220); Sumit Lama 2/76 (16 overs)
113 (33.4 overs); Pratik Desai 45 (54); Vinay Kumar 3/24 (9 overs)

Pondicherry won by an innings and 272 runs
Videocon Academy Ground, Kolkata
Umpires: Rajeev Godara and Rajesh Timaney
Player of the match: Paras Dogra (Pondicherry)

- Pondicherry won the toss and elected to field.
- Sumit Lama (Mizoram) made his first-class debut.

25–28 December 2019
Scorecard

Manipur	v	Arunachal Pradesh
196 (87 overs); Kangabam Singh 43 (107); Karkir Taye 4/25 (11 overs)		143 (47 overs); Rahul Dalal 53 (77); Ajay Lamabam 4/23 (8 overs)
215 (75 overs); Kangabam Singh 60* (91); Techi Neri 5/28 (8 overs)		184 (65.4 overs); Rahul Dalal 84 (146); Rex Rajkumar 6/58 (18 overs)

Manipur won by 84 runs
Jalan Outdoor Stadium, Dibrugarh
Umpires: Mukund Mandale and Nikhil Patwardhan
Player of the match: Rex Rajkumar (Manipur)

- Arunachal Pradesh won the toss and elected to field.
- Gelson Singh (Manipur) made his first-class debut.

25–28 December 2019
Scorecard

Sikkim	v	Nagaland
269 (74.4 overs); Iqbal Abdulla 94 (99); Nagaho Chishi 2/26 (7 overs)		296 (61.4 overs); Stuart Binny 135 (108); Ishwar Chaudhary 5/133 (26 overs)
133 (35.5 overs); Bibek Diyali 42 (61); Nagaho Chishi 4/20 (6.5 overs)		113/1 (12.2 overs); Shrikant Mundhe 45 (23); Mandup Bhutia 1/24 (3 overs)

Nagaland won by 9 wickets
KIIT Stadium, Bhubaneswar
Umpires: Saurabh Dhote and VM Dhokre
Player of the match: Stuart Binny (Nagaland)

- Nagaland won the toss and elected to field.
- Tejosel Yiethun and Vino Zhimomi (Nagaland) both made their first-class debuts.

25–28 December 2019
Scorecard

Bihar	v	Goa
326 (112 overs); Babul Kumar 160 (291); Felix Alemao 4/74 (23 overs)		470 (129.4 overs); Suyash Prabhudessai 135 (206); Ashutosh Aman 6/99 (39)
162/1 (49 overs); Indrajit Kumar 71* (163); Darshan Misal 1/31 (14 overs)

Match drawn
Moin-ul-Haq Stadium, Patna
Umpires: Puttarangaiah Jayapal and Nand Kishore
Player of the match: Suyash Prabhudessai (Goa)

- Goa won the toss and elected to field.

26–29 December 2019
Scorecard

Chandigarh	v	Meghalaya
455/9d (121.1 overs); Ankit Kaushik 148* (205); Aditya Singhania 2/103 (29 overs)		148 (48.2 overs); Puneet Bisht 84 (102); Shresth Nirmohi 5/30 (15.2 overs)
		121 (29.4 overs) (f/o); Puneet Bisht 54 (65); Gurinder Singh 4/44 (11 overs)

Chandigarh won by an innings and 189 runs
Mangaldoi Sports Association Ground, Mangaldoi
Umpires: Vinod Seshan and Arun Kumar Basa
Player of the match: Shresth Nirmohi (Chandigarh)

- Chandigarh won the toss and elected to bat.
- Tengchan Sangma (Meghalaya) made his first-class debut.

=== Round 4 ===
3–6 January 2020
Scorecard

Chandigarh	v	Nagaland
400/6d (70.3 overs); Manan Vohra 121 (140); Nagaho Chishi 5/80 (17.3 overs)		135 (58.3 overs); Imliwati Lemtur 38* (87); Shresth Nirmohi 5/39 (15 overs)
		26/0 (8 overs) (f/o); Aosashi Longchar 14* (16)

Match drawn
Nagaland Cricket Stadium, Sovima
Umpires: Nikhil Patwardhan and Puttarangaiah Jayapal
Player of the match: Shresth Nirmohi (Chandigarh)

- Nagaland won the toss and elected to field.
- No play was possible on day 1 due to a wet outfield.
- Temjentoshi Jamir (Nagaland) made his first-class debut.

3–6 January 2020
Scorecard

Sikkim	v	Arunachal Pradesh
329 (81 overs); Yashpal Singh 155 (186); Karkir Taye 3/75 (19.1 overs)		141 (48.1 overs); Samarth Seth 29 (61); Iqbal Abdulla 4/35 (18 overs)
		32/0 (13 overs) (f/o); Kamsha Yangfo 20* (34)

Match drawn
Vikas Cricket Ground, Cuttack
Umpires: Rajesh Timaney and Nand Kishore
Player of the match: Yashpal Singh (Sikkim)

- Arunachal Pradesh won the toss and elected to field.
- No play was possible on days 1 and 2 due to a wet outfield.
- Nabam Tempol (Arunachal Pradesh) made his first-class debut.

3–6 January 2020
Scorecard

Mizoram	v	Bihar
378 (112.4 overs); Pratik Desai 192 (210); Ashutosh Aman 5/107 (46 overs)		262 (66 overs); Babul Kumar 85 (138); Taruwar Kohli 5/78 (22 overs)
68 (31.4 overs); KB Pawan 46 (98); Abhijeet Saket 7/12 (10 overs)		188/4 (32.4 overs); Indrajit Kumar 98* (93); Bobby Zothansanga 2/45 (9 overs)

Bihar won by 6 wickets
Moin-ul-Haq Stadium, Patna
Umpires: Akshay Totre and Tapan Sharma
Player of the match: Abhijeet Saket (Bihar)

- Bihar won the toss and elected to field.
- Lakhan Raja, Shabbir Khan (Bihar) and Lalruatdika (Mizoram) all made their first-class debuts.

3–6 January 2020
Scorecard

Manipur	v	Goa
106 (32.1 overs); Al Bashid Muhammed 43* (88); Vijesh Prabhudessai 6/14 (10 overs)		553/5d (130.3 overs); Sumiran Amonkar 115 (164); Rex Rajkumar 2/78 (19 overs)
88 (42.4 overs); Rex Rajkumar 29 (44); Amit Verma 6/52 (19.4 overs)

Goa won by an innings and 359 runs
Goa Cricket Association Academy Ground, Porvorim
Umpires: Sanjay Kumar Singh and Krishnaraj Srinath
Player of the match: Amit Verma (Goa)

- Goa won the toss and elected to field.
- Vaibhav Govekar (Goa) and Karam Dharmendra (Manipur) both made their first-class debuts.

3–6 January 2020
Scorecard

Meghalaya	v	Pondicherry
65 (39.3 overs); Puneet Bisht 43 (97); Sagar Udeshi 5/10 (13 overs)		80 (29.5 overs); Vinay Kumar 27 (32); Sanjay Yadav 8/31 (12.5 overs)
63 (26 overs); Puneet Bisht 28 (61); Vinay Kumar 5/27 (9 overs)		49/5 (12.3 overs); Arun Karthik 13 (11); Abhay Negi 3/15 (6 overs)

Pondicherry won by 5 wickets
Mangaldoi Sports Association Ground, Mangaldoi
Umpires: Mukund Mandale and GS Ananth Ramakrishnan
Player of the match: Vinay Kumar (Pondicherry)

- Pondicherry won the toss and elected to field.
- No play was possible on day 1 due to a wet outfield.

=== Round 5 ===
11–14 January 2020
Scorecard

Bihar	v	Manipur
431 (130.2 overs); Indrajit Kumar 134 (248); Bishworjit Konthoujam 3/66 (27 overs)		94 (38.1 overs); Bonny Chingangbam 23 (50); Abhijeet Saket 7/43 (14 overs)
		154 (43.5 overs) (f/o); Rex Rajkumar 77* (94); Shivam Kumar 4/68 (18 overs)

Bihar won by an innings and 183 runs
South Dinajpur District Sports Association Cricket Ground, Balurghat
Umpires: Puttarangaiah Jayapal and Nand Kishore
Player of the match: Indrajit Kumar (Bihar)

- Manipur won the toss and elected to field.
- Atulya Priyankar (Bihar) made his first-class debut.

11–14 January 2020
Scorecard

Nagaland	v	Arunachal Pradesh
534/7d (140.2 overs); Shrikant Mundhe 166 (288); Techi Neri 3/144 (41 overs)		460 (118.5 overs); Rahul Dalal 267* (329); Imliwati Lemtur 5/123 (43.5 overs)
259/7d (62 overs); Yogesh Takawale 73* (113); Akhilesh Sahani 3/91 (22 overs)		152/4 (35 overs); Rahul Dalal 36* (29); Imliwati Lemtur 2/19 (8 overs)

Match drawn
Nagaland Cricket Stadium, Sovima
Umpires: Akshay Totre and Belur Ravi
Player of the match: Rahul Dalal (Arunachal Pradesh)

- Nagaland won the toss and elected to bat.
- Shashwat Kohli (Arunachal Pradesh) made his first-class debut.

11–14 January 2020
Scorecard

Sikkim	v	Chandigarh
264 (86.3 overs); Iqbal Abdulla 84 (109); Jagjit Singh 4/53 (16.3 overs)		360 (97.4 overs); Gurinder Singh 99 (122); Iqbal Abdulla 4/89 (31.4 overs)
69/3 (26 overs); Yashpal Singh 30* (53); Shresth Nirmohi 2/18 (8 overs)

Match drawn
Sector 16 Stadium, Chandigarh
Umpires: Sanjay Kumar Singh and GS Ananth Ramakrishnan
Player of the match: Gurinder Singh (Chandigarh)

- Chandigarh won the toss and elected to field.
- Jagjit Singh (Chandigarh), Puran Giri and Ruben Lepcha (Sikkim) all made their first-class debuts.

11–14 January 2020
Scorecard

Goa	v	Pondicherry
270 (87.5 overs); Amit Verma 121 (202); Ashith Rajiv 5/45 (15.5 overs)		260 (65.4 overs); Paras Dogra 194 (209); Felix Alemao 6/73 (19.4 overs)
255 (92 overs); Snehal Kauthankar 66 (154); Sagar Trivedi 4/56 (17 overs)		184 (65.4 overs); Fabid Ahmed 56 (109); Felix Alemao 5/72 (18 overs)

Goa won by 81 runs
Cricket Association Pondicherry Ground 2, Puducherry
Umpires: Nikhil Patwardhan and Rajesh Timaney
Player of the match: Felix Alemao (Goa)

- Pondicherry won the toss and elected to field.

12–15 January 2020
Scorecard

Meghalaya	v	Mizoram
662/4d (125 overs); Sanjay Yadav 254* (228); G Lalbiakvela 3/150 (27 overs)		114 (56.2 overs); Lalruatdika 24 (44); Aditya Singhania 4/30 (11 overs)
		123 (41.1 overs) (f/o); Taruwar Kohli 77 (118); Aditya Singhania 6/40 (12.1 overs)

Meghalaya won by an innings and 425 runs
Videocon Academy Ground, Kolkata
Umpires: Mukund Mandale and Krishnaraj Srinath
Player of the match: Sanjay Yadav (Meghalaya)

- Mizoram won the toss and elected to field.

=== Round 6 ===
19–22 January 2020
Scorecard

Mizoram	v	Sikkim
201 (59.1 overs); Taruwar Kohli 113 (152); Iqbal Abdulla 5/78 (23.1 overs)		139 (40 overs); Yashpal Singh 44 (61); G Lalbiakvela 8/56 (15 overs)
179 (39 overs); Taruwar Kohli 55 (72); Ishwar Chaudhary 5/70 (16 overs)		163 (42.2 overs); Iqbal Abdulla 37 (48); Taruwar Kohli 6/52 (14.2 overs)

Mizoram won by 78 runs
KIIT Stadium, Bhubaneswar
Umpires: Jayaraman Madanagopal and Chirra Ravikanthreddy
Player of the match: Taruwar Kohli (Mizoram)

- Sikkim won the toss and elected to field.
- Nitesh Gupta (Sikkim) made his first-class debut.

19–22 January 2020
Scorecard

Pondicherry	v	Arunachal Pradesh
209 (46.4 overs); Sagar Trivedi 79* (72); Nabam Tempol 5/61 (17.4 overs)		192 (60.5 overs); Samarth Seth 67 (107); Vinay Kumar 6/51 (17.5 overs)
351 (73.4 overs); Vinay Kumar 81* (123); Nabam Tempol 7/104 (23.4 overs)		72 (26.4 overs); Samarth Seth 12 (25); Vinay Kumar 5/25 (7.4 overs)

Pondicherry won by 296 runs
Cricket Association Pondicherry Siechem Ground, Puducherry
Umpires: Sanjay Kumar Singh and Nand Kishore
Player of the match: Nabam Tempol (Pondicherry)

- Arunachal Pradesh won the toss and elected to field.
- Takam Tallum (Arunachal Pradesh) made his first-class debut.

19–22 January 2020
Scorecard

Goa	v	Chandigarh
251 (80.3 overs); Suyash Prabhudessai 90 (191); Jagjit Singh 5/64 (21.3 overs)		580/7d (150 overs); Shivam Bhambri 157 (284); Amit Verma 3/95 (20 overs)
253/6 (118 overs); Sumiran Amonkar 64 (290); Gurinder Singh 2/35 (32 overs)

Match drawn
Goa Cricket Association Academy Ground, Porvorim
Umpires: GS Ananth Ramakrishnan and Puttarangaiah Jayapal
Player of the match: Jagjit Singh (Chandigarh)

- Chandigarh won the toss and elected to field.
- Jaskaranvir Singh (Chandigarh) made his first-class debut.

19–22 January 2020
Scorecard

Meghalaya	v	Manipur
235 (67.1 overs); Dwaraka Ravi Teja 90 (180); Homendro Kabrambam 3/29 (12 overs)		27 (18.1 overs); Bonny Chingangbam 7 (27); Sanjay Yadav 6/12 (9.1 overs)
		92 (27 overs) (f/o); Rex Rajkumar 23 (21); Sanjay Yadav 5/35 (12 overs)

Meghalaya won by an innings and 116 runs
Mangaldoi Sports Association Ground, Mangaldoi
Umpires: Mukund Mandale and Nikhil Patwardhan
Player of the match: Sanjay Yadav (Meghalaya)

- Manipur won the toss and elected to field.
- Purajit Mandal (Meghalaya), Rajkumar Jotish and Ajit Singh (Manipur) all made their first-class debuts.

19–22 January 2020
Scorecard

Nagaland	v	Bihar
166 (63.5 overs); Imliwati Lemtur 41 (72); Abhijeet Saket 3/19 (10 overs)		509/7d (123.1 overs); MD Rahmatullah 106 (161); Shrikant Mundhe 3/81 (24 overs)
444/4 (91.5 overs); Rongsen Jonathan 200* (231); Vivek Kumar 2/122 (25 overs)

Match drawn
Nagaland Cricket Stadium, Sovima
Umpires: Krishnaraj Srinath and Rajesh Timaney
Player of the match: Vikash Ranjan (Bihar)

- Nagaland won the toss and elected to bat.
- Chopise Hopongkyu (Nagaland) made his first-class debut.

=== Round 7 ===
27–30 January 2020
Scorecard

Sikkim	v	Manipur
169 (55.3 overs); Lee Yong Lepcha 48 (81); Rex Rajkumar 4/41 (10 overs)		91 (25 overs); Rex Rajkumar 25 (23); Ishwar Chaudhary 6/39 (13 overs)
266 (84.1 overs); Iqbal Abdulla 71 (95); Kangabam Singh 4/41 (16.1 overs)		112 (36.2 overs); Sultan Karim 24* (50); Palzor Tamang 6/65 (13 overs)

Sikkim won by 232 runs
Vikas Cricket Ground, Cuttack
Umpires: Puttarangaiah Jayapal and Rajesh Timaney
Player of the match: Ishwar Chaudhary (Sikkim)

- Manipur won the toss and elected to field.

27–30 January 2020
Scorecard

Bihar	v	Meghalaya
208 (66.1 overs); Ashutosh Aman 72 (84); Aditya Singhania 4/59 (18.1 overs)		179 (77.1 overs); Puneet Bisht 63 (85); Shivam Kumar 4/69 (23 overs)
361/4d (123 overs); Yashasvi Rishav 150 (364); Mark Ingty 1/3 (4 overs)		138/2 (30 overs); Puneet Bisht 48* (36); Shivam Kumar 2/49 (10 overs)

Match drawn
Moin-ul-Haq Stadium, Patna
Umpires: Sanjay Kumar Singh and Akshay Totre
Player of the match: Ashutosh Aman (Bihar)

- Meghalaya won the toss and elected to field.
- Basukinath Mishra, Yashasvi Rishav, Sarfaraz Ashraf, Amod Yadav (Bihar) and Pringsang Sangma (Meghalaya) all made their first-class debuts.

27–30 January 2020
Scorecard

Chandigarh	v	Pondicherry
134 (37.3 overs); Arslan Khan 42 (65); Vinay Kumar 6/32 (12 overs)		113 (29.2 overs); Paras Dogra 49 (58); Shresth Nirmohi 7/46 (15 overs)
102/3 (22 overs); Manan Vohra 52 (55); Damodaran Rohit 2/9 (2 overs)

Match drawn
Sector 16 Stadium, Chandigarh
Umpires: Jayaraman Madanagopal and GS Ananth Ramakrishnan
Player of the match: Shresth Nirmohi (Chandigarh)

- Pondicherry won the toss and elected to field.
- No play was possible on days 2 and 3.

27–30 January 2020
Scorecard

Nagaland	v	Mizoram
243 (83 overs); Sedezhalie Rupero 105* (253); G Lalbiakvela 5/55 (21 overs)		318/3 (94 overs); KB Pawan 129* (225); Nagaho Chishi 1/50 (20 overs)

Match drawn
Calcutta Cricket and Football Ground, Calcutta
Umpires: Mukund Mandale and Nikhil Patwardhan
Player of the match: G Lalbiakvela (Mizoram)

- Nagaland won the toss and elected to bat.
- No play was possible on day 3.
- Lalfakzuala Renthlei (Mizoram) and Oren Ngullie (Nagaland) both made their first-class debuts.

27–30 January 2020
Scorecard

Goa	v	Arunachal Pradesh
589/2d (124 overs); Vaibhav Govekar 160 (210); Shashwat Kohli 1/54 (8 overs)		83 (43.5 overs); Kamsha Yangfo 22 (89); Darshan Misal 4/24 (10.5 overs)
		170 (49.2 overs) (f/o); Rahul Dalal 68 (98); Amit Verma 6/71 (18 overs)

Goa won by an innings and 336 runs
Goa Cricket Association Academy Ground, Porvorim
Umpires: Chirra Ravikanthreddy and Nand Kishore
Player of the match: Amit Verma (Goa)

- Arunachal Pradesh won the toss and elected to field.

=== Round 8 ===
4–7 February 2020
Scorecard

Mizoram	v	Chandigarh
109 (41.2 overs); Taruwar Kohli 77 (130); Gurinder Singh 4/18 (12.2 overs)		587/5d (110.1 overs); Uday Kaul 212* (273); Sumit Lama 2/76 (14.1 overs)
122 (37 overs); KB Pawan 28 (37); Arpit Pannu 3/30 (7 overs)

Chandigarh won by an innings and 356 runs
Sector 16 Stadium, Chandigarh
Umpires: Sanjay Kumar Singh and GS Ananth Ramakrishnan
Player of the match: Uday Kaul (Chandigarh)

- Mizoram won the toss and elected to bat.
- Kunal Mahajan (Chandigarh), Uday Kumar Abhay and Henry Lalsangzuala (Mizoram) all made their first-class debuts.

4–7 February 2020
Scorecard

Pondicherry	v	Manipur
490 (102.4 overs); Fabid Ahmed 233 (268); Kangabam Singh 2/69 (17.4 overs)		138 (31.1 overs); Rex Rajkumar 33 (35); Sagar Udeshi 5/42 (13.1 overs)
		111 (35.4 overs) (f/o); Kangabam Singh 28 (27); Alagh Prathiban 5/64 (16.4 overs)

Pondicherry won by an innings and 241 runs
Videocon Academy Ground, Kolkata
Umpires: Mukund Mandale and Nikhil Patwardhan
Player of the match: Fabid Ahmed (Pondicherry)

- Manipur won the toss and elected to field.
- Gemson Singh, Somorjit Salam, Basir Rahman, Shamir Khan (Manipur), Alagh Prathiban and Parandaman Thamaraikannan (Pondicherry) all made their first-class debuts.

4–7 February 2020
Scorecard

Meghalaya	v	Sikkim
174 (47.3 overs); Puneet Bisht 85 (109); Ishwar Chaudhary 5/48 (21 overs)		128 (47 overs); Yashpal Singh 44 (70); Abhay Negi 7/42 (17 overs)
155 (51 overs); Tengchan Sangma 31 (66); Palzor Tamang 4/21 (12 overs)		135 (44 overs); Iqbal Abdulla 76* (123); Sanjay Yadav 5/51 (16 overs)

Meghalaya won by 66 runs
Mangaldoi Sports Association Ground, Mangaldoi
Umpires: Amit Bansal and Saiyed Khalid
Player of the match: Abhay Negi (Meghalaya)

- Meghalaya won the toss and elected to bat.
- Shaisngi Lyngdoh (Meghalaya) made his first-class debut.

4–7 February 2020
Scorecard

Goa	v	Nagaland
318 (105.2 overs); Vaibhav Govekar 71 (138); Shrikant Mundhe 4/51 (19 overs)		176 (67.3 overs); Shrikant Mundhe 64 (93); Amulya Pandrekar 5/31 (21 overs)
221/4d (41 overs); Snehal Kauthankar 68* (63); Stuart Binny 2/29 (9 overs)		134 (36.4 overs); Stuart Binny 58 (64); Vijesh Prabhudessai 3/13 (6 overs)

Goa won by 229 runs
Nagaland Cricket Stadium, Sovima
Umpires: K. N. Ananthapadmanabhan and Rajeev Godara
Player of the match: Amulya Pandrekar (Goa)

- Goa won the toss and elected to bat.

4–7 February 2020
Scorecard

Arunachal Pradesh	v	Bihar
351 (112.1 overs); Rahul Dalal 190 (229); Ashutosh Aman 4/82 (35.1 overs)		291 (85.2 overs); MD Rahmatullah 140 (242); Kengo Bam 5/67 (30.2 overs)
163 (71.3 overs); Rahul Dalal 35 (86); Ashutosh Aman 6/66 (28.3 overs)		227/4 (67 overs); MD Rahmatullah 113* (148); Nabam Tempol 3/33 (14 overs)

Bihar won by 6 wickets
Moin-ul-Haq Stadium, Patna
Umpires: Krishnaraj Srinath and Tapan Sharma
Player of the match: MD Rahmatullah (Bihar)

- Arunachal Pradesh won the toss and elected to bat.
- Rakesh Kumar (Arunachal Pradesh) and Nikhil Anand (Bihar) both made their first-class debuts.

=== Round 9 ===
12–15 February 2020
Scorecard

Goa	v	Mizoram
490/4d (77.5 overs); Smit Patel 236 (195); G Lalbiakvela 3/91 (16.5 overs)		109 (40.2 overs); Taruwar Kohli 50* (113); Amulya Pandrekar 3/17 (8 overs)
		170 (65 overs) (f/o); KB Pawan 111* (172); Amit Verma 5/39 (16 overs)

Goa won by an innings and 211 runs
Calcutta Cricket and Football Ground, Calcutta
Umpires: Saurabh Dhote and Navdeep Singh
Player of the match: Amit Verma (Goa)

- Mizoram won the toss and elected to field.
- Smit Patel (Goa) scored his maiden double century in first-class cricket.

12–15 February 2020
Scorecard

Nagaland	v	Pondicherry
176 (62.3 overs); Stuart Binny 59 (88); Sagar Udeshi 3/44 (21 overs)		625/8d (145.2 overs); Paras Dogra 175 (220); Shrikant Mundhe 3/86 (23 overs)
254 (67.1 overs); Rongsen Jonathan 93 (86); Santha Moorthy 5/79 (19.1 overs)

Pondicherry won by an innings and 195 runs
Cricket Association Pondicherry Siechem Ground, Puducherry
Umpires: Abhijit Bengeri and Belur Ravi
Player of the match: Santha Moorthy (Pondicherry)

- Nagaland won the toss and elected to bat.
- Ramachandran Ragupathy, Santha Moorthy (Pondicherry) and Walling Imomenba (Nagaland) all made their first-class debuts.
- Santha Moorthy (Pondicherry) became the oldest bowler to take a five-wicket haul on first-class debut, aged 40 years and 155 days.

12–15 February 2020
Scorecard

Chandigarh	v	Manipur
672/8d (141 overs); Gurinder Singh 200* (171); Sheiteendra Singh 4/69 (19 overs)		63 (26.4 overs); Bishworjit Konthoujam 18 (11); Gurinder Singh 5/19 (7 overs)
		204 (43.4 overs) (f/o); Basir Rahman 97 (123); Jagjit Singh 7/52 (10.4 overs)

Chandigarh won by an innings and 405 runs
Videocon Academy Ground, Kolkata
Umpires: Tapan Sharma and Nand Kishore
Player of the match: Gurinder Singh (Chandigarh)

- Manipur won the toss and elected to field.
- Bishworjit Konthoujam, Sunil Salam, Sheiteendra Singh and Sunil Singh (Manipur) all made their first-class debuts.
- This was the 60,000th first-class cricket match to be played.

12–15 February 2020
Scorecard

Meghalaya	v	Arunachal Pradesh
576/9d (135.4 overs); Puneet Bisht 250 (267); Kengo Bam 3/97 (22.4 overs)		222 (67.5 overs); Samarth Seth 82* (98); Sanjay Yadav 3/61 (23.5 overs)
		106 (29.2 overs) (f/o); Samarth Seth 67 (52); Sanjay Yadav 4/24 (9 overs)

Meghalaya won by an innings and 248 runs
Jalan Outdoor Stadium, Dibrugarh
Umpires: Pranav Joshi and Arun Kumar Basa
Player of the match: Puneet Bisht (Meghalaya)

- Meghalaya won the toss and elected to bat.
- Nafees Siddique and Aryan Bora (Meghalaya) both made their first-class debuts.

12–15 February 2020
Scorecard

Bihar	v	Sikkim
305 (95.2 overs); Shasheem Rathour 103 (101); Ishwar Chaudhary 5/92 (28.2 overs)		272 (78.4 overs); Yashpal Singh 140 (200); Ashutosh Aman 5/77 (25.4 overs)
417/8d (123.2 overs); Babul Kumar 195 (304); Lee Yong Lepcha 3/93 (26 overs)		69/1 (38 overs); Chitiz Tamang 32* (90); Ashutosh Aman 1/24 (15 overs)

Match drawn
DRIEMS Ground, Cuttack
Umpires: Sanjay Kumar Singh and Krishnaraj Srinath
Player of the match: Vikash Ranjan (Bihar)

- Sikkim won the toss and elected to field.
