= 2021–22 Vijay Hazare Trophy Plate Group =

Cricket tournament

- Dates: 8 – 27 December 2021
- Administrator(s): BCCI
- Cricket format: List A cricket
- Tournament format(s): Round-robin
- Participants: 8

The 2021–22 Vijay Hazare Trophy was the twentieth season of the Vijay Hazare Trophy, a List A cricket tournament that was played in India. It was contested by 38 teams, divided into six groups, with eight teams in Plate Group. The tournament was announced by the BCCI on 3 July 2021. Tripura won the Plate Group to advance to the preliminary quarter-finals.

== Points table ==
Pos	Team	Pld	W	L	NR	Pts	NRR
1	Tripura	5	5	0	0	20	2.642
2	Meghalaya	5	4	1	0	16	0.842
3	Bihar	5	3	2	0	12	1.431
4	Nagaland	5	3	2	0	12	−0.411
5	Mizoram	5	2	3	0	8	−0.413
6	Manipur	5	2	3	0	8	−0.781
7	Sikkim	5	1	4	0	4	−0.911
8	Arunachal Pradesh	5	0	5	0	0	−2.315

Source: ESPN Cricinfo

Advanced to Preliminary quarter-final

== Fixtures ==
=== Round 1 ===
8 December 2021
Scorecard

Bihar; 222/8 (50 overs)	v	Mizoram; 223/3 (47.4 overs)
Sakibul Gani 114 (139); Remruatdika Ralte 5/60 (10 overs)		Uday Kaul 121* (137); Malay Raj 1/40 (7.4 overs)

Mizoram won by 7 wickets
Sawai Mansingh Stadium, Jaipur
Umpires: Sadashiv Iyer and Krishnaraj Srinath

- Mizoram won the toss and elected to field.
- Abhijeet Saket, Bipin Saurabh, Malay Raj (Bihar), Joseph Lalthankhuma and Remruatdika Ralte (Mizoram) all made their List A debuts.

8 December 2021
Scorecard

Tripura; 336/4 (50 overs)	v	Arunachal Pradesh; 126 (39.2 overs)
Samit Gohel 135 (128); Nazeeb Saiyed 2/86 (10 overs)		Nazeeb Saiyed 75* (103); Rahil Shah 4/16 (10 overs)

Tripura won by 210 runs
KL Saini Ground, Jaipur
Umpires: Kuppuraj Madanagopal and Saiyed Khalid

- Arunachal Pradesh won the toss and elected to field.
- Akash Singh and Manish Pal (Arunachal Pradesh) both made their List A debuts.

8 December 2021
Scorecard

Meghalaya; 265/5 (50 overs)	v	Sikkim; 101 (39 overs)
Chirag Khurana 100 (120); Sumit Singh 3/50 (10 overs)		Liyan Khan 26 (37); Dippu Sangma 3/13 (7 overs)

Meghalaya won by 164 runs
Jaipuria Vidyalaya Ground, Jaipur
Umpires: Abhijeet Bengeri and Belur Ravi

- Sikkim won the toss and elected to field.
- Akash Luitel, Codanda Ajit Karthik, Kranthi Kumar, Liyan Khan (Sikkim) and Aryan Bora, Kishan Lyngdoh and Ram Gurung (Meghalaya) all made their List A debuts.

8 December 2021
Scorecard

Manipur; 80 (32.3 overs)	v	Nagaland; 83/2 (28.3 overs)
Jayanta Sagatpam 15 (29); Abu Nechim 3/10 (6 overs)		Shrikant Mundhe 51* (96); Bishworjit Konthoujam 1/23 (9 overs)

Nagaland won by 8 wickets
Soul Feel Cricket Stadium, Jaipur
Umpires: M Mohammed Rafi and K Prabhakar Rao

- Manipur won the toss and elected to bat.

=== Round 2 ===
9 December 2021
Scorecard

Arunachal Pradesh; 200 (49.5 overs)	v	Nagaland; 203/3 (41.4 overs)
Song Tacho 63 (127); Imliwati Lemtur 3/21 (10 overs)		Rongsen Jonathan 67 (70); Rajesh Bishnoi 4/35 (10 overs)

Nagaland won by 5 wickets
Sawai Mansingh Stadium, Jaipur
Umpires: Manish Jain and Pranav Joshi

- Arunachal Pradesh won the toss and elected to bat.

9 December 2021
Scorecard

Meghalaya; 273/6 (50 overs)	v	Bihar; 272 (50 overs)
Chirag Khurana 117* (128); Amod Yadav 4/33 (8 overs)		Sakibul Gani 94 (70); Dippu Sangma 1/41 (10 overs)

Meghalaya won by 1 run
KL Saini Ground, Jaipur
Umpires: Sadashiv Iyer and Krishnaraj Srinath

- Bihar won the toss and elected to field.
- Amod Yadav (Bihar) made his List A debut.

9 December 2021
Scorecard

Mizoram; 183/9 (50 overs)	v	Sikkim; 185/6 (44.3 overs)
Taruwar Kohli 69 (110); Codanda Ajit Karthik 2/27 (10 overs)		Kranthi Kumar 63* (83); Remruatdika Ralte 2/29 (7 overs)

Sikkim won by 4 wickets
Jaipuria Vidyalaya Ground, Jaipur
Umpires: Kuppuraj Madanagopal and Saiyed Khalid

- Sikkim won the toss and elected to field.

9 December 2021
Scorecard

Tripura; 273/2 (50 overs)	v	Manipur; 187/5 (50 overs)
Bishal Ghosh 119* (139); Homendro Kabrambam 1/31 (8 overs)		Langlonyamba Meitan Keishangbam 78* (100); Rahil Shah 1/18 (10 overs)

Tripura won by 86 runs
Soul Feel Cricket Stadium, Jaipur
Umpires: Abhijeet Bengeri and Belur Ravi

- Manipur won the toss and elected to field.
- Longjam Gibson Singh (Manipur) made his List A debut.

=== Round 3 ===
11 December 2021
Scorecard

Sikkim; 231/8 (50 overs)	v	Tripura; 232/2 (46.1 overs)
Liyan Khan 120 (148); Amit Ali 4/50 (10 overs)		Bishal Ghosh 127* (137); Codanda Ajit Karthik 1/38 (8 overs)

Tripura won by 8 wickets
Sawai Mansingh Stadium, Jaipur
Umpires: Mohamad Rafi and Prabhakar Rao

- Sikkim won the toss and elected to bat.
- Phur Lepcha (Sikkim) made his List A debut.

11 December 2021
Scorecard

Bihar; 280/8 (50 overs)	v	Nagaland; 142 (31.4 overs)
Mangal Mahrour 94* (93); Shrikant Mundhe 2/61 (10 overs)		Shrikant Mundhe 74 (77); Sarfaraz Ashraf 3/18 (5.4 overs)

Bihar won by 138 runs
KL Saini Ground, Jaipur
Umpires: Manish Jain and Parashar Joshi

- Nagaland won the toss and elected to field.
- Nikhil Anand (Bihar) made his List A debut.

11 December 2021
Scorecard

Meghalaya; 258/7 (50 overs)	v	Manipur; 147 (49.2 overs)
Punit Bisht 85 (71); Thomas Moirangthem 2/44 (10 overs)		L Kishan Singha 50 (123); Nafees Siddique 6/39 (10 overs)

Meghalaya won by 111 runs
Jaipuria Vidyalaya Ground, Jaipur
Umpires: Sadashiv Iyer and Krishnaraj Srinath

- Manipur won the toss and elected to field.
- Nafees Siddique (Meghalaya) made his List A debut.

11 December 2021
Scorecard

Arunachal Pradesh; 218/7 (50 overs)	v	Mizoram; 221/5 (47.5 overs)
Techi Neri 86 (142); Parvez Ahmed 3/39 (9 overs)		Taruwar Kohli 94* (91); Techi Neri 2/45 (10 overs)

Mizoram won by 5 wickets
Soul Feel Cricket Stadium, Jaipur
Umpires: Madanagopal Kuppuraj and Saiyed Khalid

- Arunachal Pradesh won the toss and elected to bat.
- Suraj Tayam (Arunachal Pradesh) and Zothanzuala (Mizoram) both made their List A debuts.

=== Round 4 ===
12 December 2021
Scorecard

Arunachal Pradesh; 116 (45 overs)	v	Manipur; 117/2 (23.4 overs)
Nazeeb Saiyed 47 (83); Bishworjit Konthoujam 5/11 (10 overs)		Johnson Singh 37* (56); Akhilesh Sahani 1/30 (6 overs)

Manipur won by 8 wickets
Sawai Mansingh Stadium, Jaipur
Umpires: Abhijeet Bengeri and Belur Ravi

- Manipur won the toss and elected to field.
- Kengo Bam (Arunachal Pradesh) made his List A debut.

12 December 2021
Scorecard

Meghalaya; 237 (49 overs)	v	Mizoram; 218/7 (50 overs)
Punit Bisht 142 (129); Taruwar Kohli 4/37 (9 overs)		Uday Kaul 109 (123); Ram Gurung 2/26 (6 overs)

Meghalaya won by 19 runs
KL Saini Ground, Jaipur
Umpires: Mohamad Rafi and Prabhakar Rao

- Mizoram won the toss and elected to field.
- B Lalnunfela (Mizoram) and Bamanbha Shangpliang (Meghalaya) both made their List A debuts.

12 December 2021
Scorecard

Nagaland; 48 (14 overs)	v	Tripura; 50/0 (10.1 overs)
Imliwati Lemtur 16* (24); Manisankar Murasingh 5/19 (6 overs)		Samrat Singha 32* (26)

Tripura won by 10 wickets
Jaipuria Vidyalaya Ground, Jaipur
Umpires: Manish Jain and Parashar Joshi

- Tripura won the toss and elected to field.

12 December 2021
Scorecard

Sikkim; 193/9 (50 overs)	v	Bihar; 194/3 (36.5 overs)
Liyan Khan 31 (39); Ashutosh Aman 4/37 (10 overs)		Bipin Saurabh 92* (96); Rahul Tamang 1/12 (4 overs)

Bihar won by 7 wickets
Soul Feel Cricket Stadium, Jaipur
Umpires: Sadashiv Iyer and Krishnaraj Srinath

- Sikkim won the toss and elected to bat.
- Pankaj Kumar Rawat, Rahul Tamang and Rajiv Malay (Sikkim) all made their List A debuts.

=== Round 5 ===
14 December 2021
Scorecard

Meghalaya; 116 (39.5 overs)	v	Tripura; 118/1 (28 overs)
Chirag Khurana 55 (93); Amit Ali 5/26 (7.5 overs)		Samit Gohel 55* (97); Chengkam Sangma 1/25 (5 overs)

Tripura won by 9 wickets
Sawai Mansingh Stadium, Jaipur
Umpires: Madanagopal Kuppuraj and Saiyed Khalid

- Tripura won the toss and elected to field.

14 December 2021
Scorecard

Sikkim; 230/9 (50 overs)	v	Manipur; 234/8 (50 overs)
Codanda Ajit Karthik 45 (40); Homendro Kabrambam 3/30 (10 overs)		Langlonyamba Meitan Keishangbam 50 (64); Codanda Ajit Karthik 3/42 (9 overs)

Manipur won by 2 wickets
KL Saini Ground, Jaipur
Umpires: Abhijeet Bengeri and Belur Ravi

- Sikkim won the toss and elected to bat.

14 December 2021
Scorecard

Arunachal Pradesh; 83 (21.3 overs)	v	Bihar; 87/4 (19.1 overs)
Rajesh Bishnoi 25 (30); Malay Raj 5/38 (10 overs)		Pratyush Singh 28* (36); Rajesh Bishnoi 3/24 (6 overs)

Bihar won by 6 wickets
Jaipuria Vidyalaya Ground, Jaipur
Umpires: Mohamad Rafi and Prabhakar Rao

- Bihar won the toss and elected to field.
- Kumar Rajnish, Washim Ashrar (Bihar), Ngurang Tana and Teli Camdir (Arunachal Pradesh) all made their List A debuts.

14 December 2021
Scorecard

Nagaland; 236/8 (50 overs)	v	Mizoram; 156 (48 overs)
Abu Nechim 62* (62); Parvez Ahmed 3/49 (10 overs)		Uday Kaul 39 (55); Imliwati Lemtur 4/23 (10 overs)

Nagaland won by 80 runs
Soul Feel Cricket Stadium, Jaipur

- Mizoram won the toss and elected to field.
- Andrew Vanlalhruaia (Mizoram) and Vijay Rai (Nagaland) both made their List A debuts.
