= List of Chandigarh cricketers =

List of first-class cricketers by club

This is an incomplete list in alphabetical order of cricketers who have played for Chandigarh in top-class (Note: Top-class matches are first-class, List A, and Twenty20.) matches since the club initially achieved first-class status in 2019.

== Key ==
- † preceding a player's name means that the original article is now a redirect to this list.

== A ==
- Abhishek Singh (2023/24)
- Arslan Khan (2019/20-2025/26)
- Murugan Ashwin (2023/24)
- A. Azad (2019/20-2025/26)

== B ==
- Raj Angad Bawa (2021/22-2025/26)
- S. Bawa (2009/10)
- Shivam Bhambri (2019/20-2025/26)
- N. Birla (2024/25-2025/26)
- Raman Bishnoi (2019/20-2025/26)

== C ==
- Yuvraj Chaudhary (2021/22-2022/23)
- P. Chopra (2009/10)
- H. Chowdhry (2024/25-2025/26)

== D ==
- Devinder Singh (2021/22)
- R. Dhanda (2022/23-2025/26)
- C. S. Dhindsa (2024/25-2025/26)

== G ==
- Gaurav Gambhir (2009/10-2022/23)
- A. Garg (2023/24)
- Gurender Singh (2009/10-2024/25)

== H ==
- Harjit Singh (2025/26)
- Harnoor Singh (2021/22-2023/24)

== J ==
- Jagjit Singh (2019/20-2025/26)
- Jaskaran Singh (2019/20-2021/22)
- Jaskaranvir Singh (2019/20-2021/22)
- T. Joshi (2024/25-2025/26)

== K ==
- K. Kaila (2023/24)
- A. Kanwar (2019/20-2025/26)
- S. Kanwar (2020/21-2021/22)
- H. Kapoor (2022/23-2025/26)
- Karanveer Singh (2019/20)
- V. Kashyap (2023/24-2025/26)
- Uday Kaul (2019/20-2020/21)
- Ankit Kaushik (2019/20-2025/26)

== L ==
- † Baghmender Lather (2020/21-2025/26)
- Amrit Lubana (2020/21-2025/26)

== M ==
- Kunal Mahajan (2019/20-2024/25)
- Mandeep Singh (2020/21-2023/24)

== N ==
- V. Narang (2025/26)
- Naveen (2009/10)
- Shresth Nirmohi (2019/20-2022/23)

== P ==
- N. Pajni (2025/26)
- N. Pandita (2023/24)
- Arjit Pannu (2021/22-2025/26)
- Arpit Pannu (2019/20-2023/24)
- A. Parashar (2019/20)
- Gaurav Puri (2019/20-2025/26)

== R ==
- Rahul Singh (2025/26)
- A. Rana (2022/23-2023/24)

== S ==
- A. Saini (2024/25-2025/26)
- S. Saini (2025/26)
- K. Sandil (2025/26)
- Bipul Sharma (2019/20-2020/21)
- N. Sharma (2024/25-2025/26)
- Sandeep Sharma (2021/22-2025/26)
- M. Sidhu (2023/24-2025/26)
- A. Sikka (2024/25)
- Preet Kamal Singh (2019/20)
- Barinder Sran (2019/20)
- A. Sudan (2023/24)
- Surya Singh (2012/13)
- Taranpreet Singh (2025/26)

== T ==
- N. Thakur (2025/26)

== V ==
- P. K. Vaidik (2021/22)
- Vivek (2012/13)
- Manan Vohra (2019/20-2025/26)

== Y ==
- P. Yadav (2024/25)
