= List of Bihar cricketers =

Cricketers who have played for Bihar in senior matches

This is a list of all cricketers who have played in first-class, List A or Twenty20 matches for Bihar, mostly in the Ranji Trophy (FC), Vijay Hazare Trophy (LA), and Syed Mushtaq Ali Trophy (T20) competitions. Seasons given are the first and last in which each player represented Bihar, but they may not have played in all the interim seasons and many played for other senior teams besides Bihar. Players in bold have played international cricket.

Bihar made their senior debut in December 1936 when they joined the Ranji Trophy and played Bengal at the Rangers Ground in Calcutta. They took part in the Ranji Trophy every season from 1936/37 until 2003/04, but were then absent until November 2018 when they were reinstated as one of ten expansion teams.

Last updated 23 November 2023.

== A ==
{{columns-list|colwidth=30em|

- S. Ahmed, 1998/99
- J. Alam, 1939/40
- Ashutosh Aman, 2018/19–2022/23
- Amarendra Singh, 2003/04
- S. H. Amin, 1965/66
- Amit Kumar, 1991/92
- Apurva Anand, 2020/21–2022/23
- H. S. Anand, 1967/68
- Nikhil Anand, 2019/20–2021/22
- S. J. Anand, 2021/22
- Anavit Kumar, 2002/03
- Anil Kumar, 1995/96–1999/00
- Anunay Singh, 2018/19–2022/23
- S. Arfi, 1991/92–1999/00
- R. Arora, 1986/87–1989/90
- Asfan Khan, 2018/19–2019/20
- Ashok Kumar, 1993/94–1998/99
- Ashok Pal, 1970/71
- Alok Singh,1995/2007
- Sarfaraz Ashraf, 2019/20–2021/22
- D. Augustus, 1982/83–1984/85
- Avinash Kumar, 1984/85–1999/00
- Vaibhav Sinha

== B ==
- Babul Kumar, 2018/19–2023/24
- Babu Rao, 1965/66
- S. Bagchi, 1940/41–1948/49
- A. Balsora, 1939/40
- M. Banerjee, 1957/58
- R. Banerjee, 1963/64–1964/65
- S. Banerjee, 1939/40–1943/44
- **Shute Banerjee**, 1942/43–1957/58
- **Subroto Banerjee**, 1987/88–1995/96
- T. Banerjee, 1951/52–1958/59
- Banshidar Kumar, 2021/22–2022/23
- D. R. Bhagat, 1969/70
- S. Bhagat, 1964/65
- M. R. Bhalla, 1975/76–1985/86
- Bhandaranayake, 1945/46
- **Prakash Bhandari**, 1969/70
- Narsimh Bhandari, 1959/60–1960/61
- A. Bhardwaj, 1976/77–1978/79
- Vijay Bharti, 2018/19–2019/20
- Utkarsh Bhaskar, 2018/19–2019/20
- Anjan Bhattacharjee, 1970/71–1972/73
- B. Bhattacharya, 1949/50
- B. S. Bihari, 2022/23–2023/24
- A. Bose, 1964/65
- Bikash Bose, 1949/50–1952/53
- Biraj Bose, 1950/51
- Bimal Bose, 1940/41–1963/64
- I. Bose, 1992/93–1994/95
- K. Bose, 1942/43
- S. Bose, 1954/55–1955/56
- S. Bose, 1944/45–1950/51
- S. K. Bose, 1959/60–1974/75
- F. Brierley, 1939/40
- R. C. Brookes, 1936/37

== C ==
- M. pinkesh pandit, 1947/48–1948/49
- N. Chakrabarty, 1948/49–1951/52
- D. Chakraborty, 1996/97–1999/00
- K. Chakravarthy, 1957/58–1968/69
- B. rakesh k dost piyush, 1951/52
- S. Chakravorty, 1936/37–1940/41
- D. Chandra, 1997/98–1998/99
- K. Chati, 1971/72–1972/73
- Chatrapalsinhji, 1967/68–1969/70
- Anup Chatterjee, 1961/62–1970/71
- G. Chatterjee, 1977/78
- P. K. Chatterjee, 1952/53–1958/59
- S. Chatterjee, 1990/91–1995/96
- G. Chauhan, 1956/57–1967/68
- P. Chetty, 1969/70
- Chiranjivi Kumar, 2019/20
- S. B. Choubey, 2002/03–2003/04
- G. D. Choudhary, 2021/22–2022/23
- Rana Chowdhary, 2000/01
- A. Chowdhury, 1972/73
- A. Chowdhury, 1936/37–1938/39
- K. Chowdhury, 1937/38
- **Nirode Chowdhury**, 1941/42–1957/58
- S. Coates, 1938/39
- L. F. Coelho, 1938/39

== D ==
- Kunal Dabas, 2019/20
- Daljit Singh, 1957/58
- Daljit Singh, 1966/67–1978/79
- A. Das, 1949/50
- A. Das, 1957/58–1964/65
- K. Das, 1937/38
- K. Das, 1973/74–1984/85
- P. Das, 1988/89–1992/93
- P. Das, 1963/64
- S. Das, 1945/46–1965/66
- S. Das, 1990/91–1991/92
- Subroto Das, 1972/73–1985/86
- U. Das, 1984/85–1990/91
- Vishal Das, 2018/19
- Anil K. Dasgupta, 1943/44–1949/50
- Benu Dasgupta, 1956/57
- J. Dasgupta, 1936/37–1937/38
- Dass, 1937/38
- M. Dastoor, 1939/40–1941/42
- A. Datta, 1957/58–1961/62
- A. Dayal, 1985/86–1994/95
- R. Dayal, 1953/54
- Deepak Kumar, 1993/94–1997/98
- R. Deora, 1984/85–1986/87
- A. Deshraj, 1962/63
- S. Dey, 1949/50–1951/52
- A. Deysarkar, 1944/45
- Dhananjay Singh, 1989/90–1996/97
- Dhiraj Kumar, 1996/97–2000/01
- **MS Dhoni**, 1999/00–2003/04
- M. S. Diwakar, 1999/00–2003/04
- S. B. Dutt, 1946/47–1947/48
- M. Dutta, 1980/81–1981/82
- T. Dutta, 1954/55–1958/59
- C. Duttagupta, 1976/77
- Y. Parth u, 2007/18
- J. Pawan j, 2007/18
- M. Ansh N, 2008/17

== E ==
- H. D. Edmunds, 1942/43
- C. S. Ekambaram, 1959/60–1963/64

== G ==
- Sakibul Gani, 2019/20–2023/24
- Gaurav, 2022/23
- Anshuman Gautam, 2018/19–2019/20
- A. Ghosh, 1979/80–1981/82
- B. Ghosh, 1974/75
- B. Ghosh, 1961/62–1966/67
- G. Ghosh, 1965/66–1970/71
- K. Ghosh, 1942/43–1943/44
- K. Ghosh, 2003/04
- S. Ghosh, 1956/57–1957/58
- S. Ghosh, 1943/44
- T. Ghosh, 1971/72–1975/76
- Maharaja of Gidhaur, 1937/38
- Hari Gidwani, 1978/79–1991/92
- M. Goel, 2003/04
- Suri Gopalakrishna, 1965/66
- M. Gosavi, 1964/65
- B. S. Gossain, 1983/84–1992/93
- M. Guha, 1944/45
- K. K. Gupta, 2018/19
- S. Gupta, 1999/00
- S. R. Gupta, 2019/20
- S. S. Gupta, 2003/04

== H ==
- Himanshu Hari, 2018/19
- A. Hashmi, 1999/00–2002/03
- Hilal Ali Khan, 1992/93–1993/94
- Himanshu Singh, 2022/23
- A. Hussain, 1987/88–1995/96
- S. Hussain, 2002/03–2003/04
- S. F. K. Hyderi, 1937/38
- Hydes, 1944/45

== I ==
- Indrajit Kumar, 2018/19–2019/20
- Israr Ali, 1960/61

== J ==
- V. Janakiram, 1981/82–1982/83
- Javed Khan, 1999/00–2001/02
- Ajay Jha, 1974/75–1975/76
- C. M. Jha, 1996/97–2003/04
- S. Jha, 1992/93–1997/98
- J. Jiya, 1974/75
- Jodh Singh, 1971/72–1979/80
- A. R. Johri, 2022/23
- V. Joseph, 1978/79–1982/83
- G. Joshi, 2023/24

== K ==
- N. Kamal, 1977/78
- Kamlesh Kumar, 2019/20
- C. D. Kannan, 1969/70
- P. M. Kapadia, 1938/39
- S. K. Kapoor, 1965/66–1966/67
- Saba Karim, 1982/83–1993/94
- Suraj Kashyap, 2020/21–2023/24
- Keshav Kumar, 2003/04–2019/20
- D. S. Khambatta, 1938/39–1948/49
- Rehan Khan, 2018/19
- F. M. Khan, 1937/38
- P. Khanna, 1986/87–1993/94
- H. V. Khote, 1958/59
- V. Khullar, 1990/91–1997/98
- D. King, 1939/40
- S. P. Krishna, 1997/98–2003/04
- Vipul Krishna, 2019/20
- R. Krishnamurthy, 1952/53–1961/62
- N. Krishnan, 1959/60
- S. N. Kuckreja, 1958/59–1959/60
- Kuldip Singh, 1985/86
- A. Kumar, 1959/60
- A. Kumar, 2021/22
- Mohit Kumar, 2020/21
- N. Kumar, 1941/42–1942/43
- Rahul Kumar, 2020/21
- Shivam Kumar, 2019/20–2022/23
- Sachin Kumar Singh, 2021/22
- kaushal kishor,2020/21

== L ==
- S. N. Lall, 1993/94
- T. J. S. Lamba, 1982/83–1984/85
- Latiff, 1946/47
- Edward Leigh, 1936/37–1937/38
- R. S. Lewis, 1952/53
- Loganathan, 1959/60
- Lunn, 1942/43–1943/44

== M ==
- D. Madan, 1944/45
- R. K. Madhav, 2022/23
- Mangal Mahrour, 2018/19–2022/23
- K. G. Majithia, 1963/64–1964/65
- Puneet Malik, 2018/19
- Manish Kumar sen, 1999/00–2002/03
- P. Marcose, 1956/57
- P. Mardi, 2022/23
- Basukinath Mishra, 2019/20–2022/23
- A. Mitra, 1971/72
- A. Mitter, 1944/45–1945/46
- Kalyan Mitter, 1965/66–1968/69
- N. Mody, 1940/41
- Vivek Mohan, 2018/19
- Mohsin Kazi, 1936/37
- H. Moitra, 1962/63–1967/68
- Eric Morris, 1936/37
- Kumar Mridul, 2018/19–2022/23
- B. Mukherjee, 1941/42
- D. K. Mukherjee, 1963/64–1968/69
- D. P. Mukherjee, 1960/61
- Robin Mukherjee, 1969/70–1979/80
- S. Mukherjee, 1968/69–1972/73
- Sujit Mukherjee, 1951/52–1959/60
- A. Mustafa, 1987/88

== N ==
- P. Nagarwalla, 1964/65–1968/69
- S. Nagaswamy, 1965/66–1968/69
- K. S. Naidoo, 1958/59
- R. Nair, 1972/73–1979/80
- S. Nair, 1973/74–1983/84
- H. C. Nakhuda, 1949/50–1950/51
- S. Nandy, 1959/60–1961/62
- K. A. D. Naoroji, 1936/37–1940/41
- V. Narang, 1954/55
- P. Narayan, 1976/77
- S. Natarajan, 1953/54–1955/56
- Nawaz, 2022/23
- Nawaz Khan, 2022/23–2023/24
- Neeraj Kumar, 1997/98–1998/99
- S. Nigrodh, 2023/24
- Nikku Singh, 2019/20
- Nishant Kumar, 2019/20

== O ==
- Pragyan Ojha, 2018/19
- Sandir Om Prakash, 1951/52–1957/58

== P ==
- A. Pahuja, 1997/98
- S. Panda, 1996/97–2003/04
- A. Pandey, 2001/02–2002/03
- E. B. Park, 1938/39
- A. Parmar, 2023/24
- M. O. Parthasarathy, 1976/77–
- Pushkar, 1990/1991-1999/2000

1978/79

- Patankar, 1943/44
- J. Patel, 1996/97–1997/98
- K. Patel, 1967/68
- M. Patel, 1992/93
- S. Patel, 1943/44
- S. S. Patel, 1949/50–1961/62
- Vikash Patel, 2020/21
- S. Pathanki, 1936/37
- B. Patnaik, 1945/46–1948/49
- D. V. Pichamuthu, 1959/60–1963/64
- Prabhat Kumar, 2002/03
- A. Prakash, 1996/97–2003/04
- A. R. Prasad, 1990/91–1991/92
- K. Prasad, 1953/54–1958/59
- R. Pratap Singh, 2022/23–2023/24
- V. Pratap Singh, 2022/23
- Pratyush Singh, 2021/22
- Premsagar, 1959/60–1960/61
- Atulya Priyankar, 2019/20

== Q ==
- A. Qasim, 1968/69
- Samar Quadri, 2018/19–2021/22
- N. Qureshi, 1936/37–1937/38

== R ==
- MD Rahmatullah, 2018/19–2020/21
- M. K. Rai, 2018/19
- Akash Raj, 2020/21
- A. Raj, 2000/01–2003/04
- Anuj Raj, 2020/21–2023/24
- H. Raj, 2021/22–2023/24
- M. M. Raj, 2021/22–2023/24
- Rohit Raj, 2018/19–2022/23
- V. S. Raj, 2022/23
- Lakhan Raja, 2019/20–2021/22
- Rajesh Singh, 2019/20
- Vijay Rajindernath, 1949/50–1951/52
- Rajiv Kumar, 1994/95–2003/04
- Kumar Rajnish, 2018/19–2021/22
- Rakesh Kumar, 1996/97–2001/02
- Ram Kumar, 1989/90
- Randhir Singh, 1980/81–1988/89
- V. S. Rangarajan, 1960/61
- N. Ranjan, 1994/95–2002/03
- R. K. Ranjan, 1996/97
- S. Ranjan, 2001/02–2002/03
- S. Ranjan, 1984/85–1995/96
- Vikash Ranjan, 2018/19–2022/23
- Ranjan Singh, 2002/03
- K. I. Rao, 2001/02
- K. K. Rao, 1999/00
- K. V. P. Rao, 1987/88–1999/00
- Shankar Rao, 2000/01–2003/04
- Ratan Kumar, 1999/00–2003/04
- S. S. Rathour, 2019/20–2021/22
- Eshaan Ravi, 2018/19–2019/20
- Rajan Kumar, 2021/22
- Yashasvi Rishav, 2019/20–2022/23
- Rohan Kumar, 2019/20
- A. Roy, 1946/47
- B. Roy, 1994/95
- B. Roy, 1946/47–1948/49
- B. K. Roy, 1998/99
- M. K. Roy, 1958/59–1966/67
- N. Roy, 1959/60–1961/62
- R. P. Roy, 1960/61–1966/67
- S. Roy, 1995/96–1999/00
- S. Roy, 1967/68–1968/69
- Sandip Roy, 1969/70–1983/84
- Shyamlal Roy, 1980/81–1985/86
- S. K. Roy, 1937/38–1941/42
- S. R. Roy, 2001/02
- A. Roy Chowdhury, 1961/62

== S ==
- Sabir Khan, 2018/19–2019/20
- Abhijeet Saket, 2018/19–2023/24
- S. N. Saket, 2022/23
- Sakib Hussain, 2022/23
- S. R. Sanghvi, 1970/71
- E. Sanjana, 1940/41–1946/47
- Sanjay Singh, 1994/95–2001/02
- Sanjeev Kumar, 1991/92–1993/94
- Santosh Lal, 2003/04
- Rajen Sanyal, 1949/50–1967/68
- Robin Sanyal, 1963/64
- S. Sanyal, 1952/53–1965/66
- Satish Singh, 1984/85–1994/95
- Satish Singh, 1998/99–2001/02
- B. K. Saurabh, 2021/22–2023/24
- Saurav Kumar, 2021/22
- Ramesh Saxena, 1966/67–1981/82
- V. Saxena, 1997/98–1999/00
- B. Sen, 1936/37–1949/50
- D. Sen, 1947/48
- M. Sengupta, 2002/03
- M. N. Sengupta, 1937/38–1938/39
- Shabbir Khan, 2019/20–2020/21
- B. Shah, 1954/55
- Shahid Khan, 1999/00–2003/04
- R. Shankar, 2022/23
- V. Shankar, 1994/95–1997/98
- K. Sharan, 1998/99–2000/01
- Kundan Sharma, 2018/19
- R. R. Sharma, 1986/87–1987/88
- S. K. Sharma, 1993/94
- Shashi Shekhar, 2019/20–2021/22
- Shivam Singh, 2021/22–2022/23
- S. Shome, 1973/74–1975/76
- Anand Shukla, 1966/67–1974/75
- R. C. Shukla, 1970/71–1974/75
- S. A. Shukla, 2001/02
- Shyamsunder, 1962/63
- M. Siddiqui, 2002/03
- V. K. Sikka, 1962/63
- Harsh Singh, 2018/19–2023/24
- Piyush Singh, 2018/19–2022/23
- Prashant Singh, 2018/19
- P. S. Singh, 2023/24
- S. K. Singh, 2019/20–2023/24
- S. K. Singh, 1982/83–1990/91
- A. Sinha, 1977/78–1980/81
- A. Sinha, 1984/85–1986/87
- Ashish Sinha, 2018/19
- S. Sinha, 1991/92–1994/95
- Shyamal Sinha, 1951/52–1962/63
- S. Sinha, 1974/75–1987/88
- V. Sivaramakrishnan, 1975/76
- A. Sotiya, 2021/22
- L. Sterling, 1948/49
- Sunil Kumar jun, 1989/90–2001/02
- A. Sur, 1963/64
- T. P. Sweeney, 1943/44

== T ==
- Tariq-ur-Rehman, 1993/94–2002/03
- Tarun Kumar, 1992/93–2002/03
- G. Tilak Raj, 1968/69–1976/77
- S. Tiwari, 1978/79

== U ==
- G. Upadhyaya, 1969/70–1972/73
- R. S. Upadhyaya, 1970/71–1974/75

== V ==
- N. Vania, 1940/41
- S. R. Vansh, 2022/23
- K. Vasudevan, 1961/62
- V. Vats, 2022/23
- V. Venkatram, 1973/74–1991/92
- R. Verma, 1990/91
- S. Vig, 2003/04
- Vikash Kumar, 1998/99–2000/01
- Vikrant Singh, 2021/22
- Vivek Kumar, 2018/19–2019/20
- Vaibhav Suryavanshi 2025 - prest

== W ==
- Washim Ashrar, 2021/22

== Y ==
- Amod Yadav, 2019/20–2023/24
- K. K. Yadav, 2023/24
- M. Yadav, 1996/97–1998/99
- Vikash Yadav, 2019/20–2020/21

== Z ==
- Zahur Ahmed, 1940/41
- F. R. Zall, 1945/46
- Zishan-ul-Yaquin, 1994/95–2000/01
