= 2022–23 Syed Mushtaq Ali Trophy Group E =

Cricket tournament

- Dates: 11 October – 5 November 2022
- Administrator: BCCI
- Cricket format: Twenty20 cricket
- Tournament format: Round-robin
- Participants: 7

The 2022–23 Syed Mushtaq Ali Trophy was the fifteenth season of the Syed Mushtaq Ali Trophy, a Twenty20 cricket tournament played in India. It was contested by 38 teams, divided into five groups, with seven teams in Group E. The tournament was announced by BCCI on 8 August 2022.

== Points table ==
Pos	Team	Pld	W	L	NR	Pts	NRR
1	Bengal	6	4	1	1	18	2.043
2	Chhattisgarh	6	4	1	1	18	1.600
3	Tamil Nadu	6	4	2	0	16	0.863
4	Jharkhand	6	2	2	2	12	1.869
5	Chandigarh	6	3	3	0	12	0.282
6	Odisha	6	2	4	0	8	−1.502
7	Sikkim	6	0	6	0	0	−4.316

Updated to match(es) played on 22 October 2022. Source: ESPN Cricinfo

Advanced to Quarter-final
Advanced to Preliminary quarter-final

== Fixtures ==
=== Round 1 ===
11 October 2022
Scorecard

Bengal	v	Jharkhand

Match abandoned without a ball bowled
BRSABV Ekana Cricket Stadium B, Lucknow
Umpires: Dharmesh Bhardwaj and VM Dhokre

- No toss.
- No play was possible due to a wet outfield.

11 October 2022
Scorecard

Sikkim; 100/6 (20 overs)	v	Odisha; 101/1 (15.2 overs)
Pankaj Kumar Rawat 34 (34); Jayanta Behera 2/19 (4 overs)		Subhranshu Senapati 33* (21); Lee Yong Lepcha 1/21 (4 overs)

Odisha won by 9 wickets
BRSABV Ekana Cricket Stadium, Lucknow
Umpires: Pranav Joshi and Pashchim Pathak

- Sikkim won the toss and elected to bat.
- Pankaj Kumar Rawat, Ankur Malik, James Rai, Anwesh Sharma (Sikkim), Mushtaq Beg, Sameer Mohanty, Rakesh Pattnaik and Aasirwad Swain (Odisha) all made their T20 debuts.
- Impact Player Sub: Anil Subba for Pankaj Kumar Rawat (Sikkim).

11 October 2022
Scorecard

Chhattisgarh; 132/5 (20 overs)	v	Tamil Nadu; 126/9 (20 overs)
Harpreet Singh Bhatia 49 (40); Varun Chakravarthy 2/12 (4 overs)		Chezhian Harinishanth 33 (36); Ravi Kiran 3/26 (4 overs)

Chhattisgarh won by 6 runs
BRSABV Ekana Cricket Stadium, Lucknow
Umpires: Pranav Joshi and Pashchim Pathak

- Chhattisgarh won the toss and elected to bat.
- G Ajitesh (Tamil Nadu) and Sahban Khan (Chhattisgarh) both made their T20 debuts.
- Impact Player Subs: Chezhian Harinishanth for T Natarajan (Tamil Nadu) and Sahban Khan for Rishabh Tiwari (Chhattisgarh).

=== Round 2 ===
12 October 2022
Scorecard

Odisha; 141/3 (20 overs)	v	Tamil Nadu; 143/5 (18.5 overs)
Subhranshu Senapati 65 (53); T Natarajan 2/32 (4 overs)		Baba Aparajith 63* (42); Sameer Mohanty 2/7 (2 overs)

Tamil Nadu won by 5 wickets
BRSABV Ekana Cricket Stadium, Lucknow
Umpires: Dharmesh Bhardwaj and VM Dhokre

- Odisha won the toss and elected to bat.
- Sushil Barik (Odisha) made his T20 debut.
- Impact Player Subs: Abhishek Tanwar for Sandeep Warrier (Tamil Nadu) and Sushil Barik for Anshuman Rath (Odisha).

12 October 2022
Scorecard

Chhattisgarh	v	Jharkhand

Match abandoned without a ball bowled
BRSABV Ekana Cricket Stadium B, Lucknow
Umpires: Pranav Joshi and Pashchim Pathak

- No toss.
- No play was possible due to a wet outfield.

12 October 2022
Scorecard

Chandigarh; 178/3 (20 overs)	v	Sikkim; 112/9 (20 overs)
Gaurav Puri 93* (47); Lee Yong Lepcha 1/21 (3 overs)		Ashish Thapa 52 (44); Sandeep Sharma 3/22 (3 overs)

Chandigarh won by 66 runs
BRSABV Ekana Cricket Stadium, Lucknow
Umpires: Dharmesh Bhardwaj and VM Dhokre

- Chandigarh won the toss and elected to bat.
- Harnoor Singh (Chandigarh) and Md Kush (Sikkim) both made their T20 debuts.
- Impact Player Sub: Md Kush for Md Saptulla (Sikkim).

=== Round 3 ===
14 October 2022
Scorecard

Sikkim; 79 (20 overs)	v	Tamil Nadu; 80/1 (9.4 overs)
Pankaj Kumar Rawat 22 (29); Ravisrinivasan Sai Kishore 3/7 (4 overs)		Narayan Jagadeesan 58* (35); Md Saptulla 1/22 (3 overs)

Tamil Nadu won by 9 wickets
BRSABV Ekana Cricket Stadium B, Lucknow
Umpires: Dharmesh Bhardwaj and Pranav Joshi

- Tamil Nadu won the toss and elected to field.
- Impact Player Subs: Khush Mohamed for Pankaj Kumar Rawat (Sikkim) and Manimaran Siddharth for Sandeep Warrier (Tamil Nadu).

14 October 2022
Scorecard

Jharkhand; 106/9 (20 overs)	v	Chandigarh; 107/1 (17.3 overs)
Aayush Bhardwaj 30 (34); Gurinder Singh 4/20 (4 overs)		Manan Vohra 72* (66)

Chandigarh won by 9 wickets
BRSABV Ekana Cricket Stadium, Lucknow
Umpires: VM Dhokre and Pashchim Pathak

- Jharkhand won the toss and elected to bat.
- Aayush Bhardwaj, Rajandeep Singh (Jharkhand) and Rohit Dhanda (Chandigarh) all made their T20 debuts.
- Impact Player Subs: Pankaj Kumar for Kumar Kushagra (Jharkhand) and Rohit Dhanda for Jagjit Singh (Chandigarh).

14 October 2022
Scorecard

Odisha; 86 (18.1 overs)	v	Bengal; 87/2 (14.3 overs)
Abhishek Raut 24 (21); Mukesh Kumar 3/12 (3.1 overs)		Abhimanyu Easwaran 37* (37); Rajesh Mohanty 1/19 (4 overs)

Bengal won by 8 wickets
BRSABV Ekana Cricket Stadium, Lucknow
Umpires: VM Dhokre and Pashchim Pathak

- Bengal won the toss and elected to field.
- Sudip Kumar Gharami, Ranjot Khaira and Abhishek Porel (Bengal) all made their T20 debuts.
- Impact Player Subs: Abhishek Porel for Mukesh Kumar (Bengal) and Sujit Lenka for Aasirwad Swain (Odisha).

=== Round 4 ===
16 October 2022
Scorecard

Bengal; 164/6 (20 overs)	v	Tamil Nadu; 121/9 (20 overs)
Shahbaz Ahmed 42* (27); Washington Sundar 2/24 (4 overs)		Sai Sudharsan 64 (48); Shahbaz Ahmed 3/13 (4 overs)

Bengal won by 43 runs
BRSABV Ekana Cricket Stadium, Lucknow
Umpires: Dharmesh Bhardwaj and VM Dhokre

- Bengal won the toss and elected to bat.
- Impact Player Subs: Abhishek Tanwar for Sandeep Warrier (Tamil Nadu) and Abhishek Porel for Ranjot Khaira (Bengal).

16 October 2022
Scorecard

Chandigarh; 179/6 (20 overs)	v	Odisha; 181/9 (20 overs)
Bhagmender Lather 59 (41); Tarani Sa 2/25 (3 overs)		Rakesh Pattnaik 61* (24); Jagjit Singh 4/29 (4 overs)

Odisha won by 1 wicket
BRSABV Ekana Cricket Stadium B, Lucknow
Umpires: Pranav Joshi and Pashchim Pathak

- Odisha won the toss and elected to field.
- Impact Player Subs: Rohit Dhanda for Harnoor Singh (Chandigarh) and Sameer Mohanty for Tarani Sa (Odisha).

16 October 2022
Scorecard

Sikkim; 52 (14.5 overs)	v	Chhattisgarh; 53/1 (6.1 overs)
Ashish Thapa 17 (25); Sumit Ruikar 3/16 (4 overs)		Amandeep Khare 34* (25); Lee Yong Lepcha 1/22 (3 overs)

Chhattisgarh won by 9 wickets
BRSABV Ekana Cricket Stadium, Lucknow
Umpires: Dharmesh Bhardwaj and VM Dhokre

- Sikkim won the toss and elected to bat.
- Nasun Tamang (Sikkim) made his T20 debut.
- Impact Player Subs: Nasun Tamang for Pankaj Kumar Rawat (Sikkim) and Sahban Khan for Sumit Ruikar (Chhattisgarh).

=== Round 5 ===
18 October 2022
Scorecard

Chandigarh; 150/6 (20 overs)	v	Chhattisgarh; 156/2 (18.2 overs)
Manan Vohra 52 (43); Sourabh Majumdar 2/13 (2 overs)		Amandeep Khare 73 (59); Yuvraj Chaudhary 1/18 (3 overs)

Chhattisgarh won by 8 wickets
BRSABV Ekana Cricket Stadium, Lucknow
Umpires: Pranav Joshi and Pashchim Pathak

- Chandigarh won the toss and elected to bat.
- Impact Player Sub: Rohit Dhanda for Raj Bawa (Chandigarh).

18 October 2022
Scorecard

Bengal; 179/6 (20 overs)	v	Sikkim; 95/8 (20 overs)
Sudip Kumar Gharami 56 (43); Sumit Singh 2/29 (4 overs)		Ashish Thapa 21 (23); Karan Lal 2/5 (2 overs)

Bengal won by 84 runs
BRSABV Ekana Cricket Stadium B, Lucknow
Umpires: Dharmesh Bhardwaj and VM Dhokre

- Bengal won the toss and elected to bat.
- Ravi Kumar (Bengal) made his T20 debut.
- Impact Player Sub: Ravi Kumar for Ranjot Khaira (Bengal).

18 October 2022
Scorecard

Tamil Nadu; 138 (20 overs)	v	Jharkhand; 126/8 (20 overs)
Sai Sudharsan 47 (38); Shahbaz Nadeem 4/12 (4 overs)		Virat Singh 52* (38); Ravisrinivasan Sai Kishore 3/6 (4 overs)

Tamil Nadu won by 12 runs
BRSABV Ekana Cricket Stadium, Lucknow
Umpires: Pranav Joshi and Pashchim Pathak

- Tamil Nadu won the toss and elected to bat.
- Impact Player Subs: Pankaj Kumar for Rahul Shukla (Jharkhand) and Sanjay Yadav for Chezhian Harinishanth (Tamil Nadu).

=== Round 6 ===
20 October 2022
Scorecard

Bengal; 161/5 (20 overs)	v	Chhattisgarh; 108 (18.5 overs)
Shahbaz Ahmed 48* (28); Shubham Agarwal 3/41 (4 overs)		Amandeep Khare 29 (31); Pradipta Pramanik 4/13 (3 overs)

Bengal won by 53 runs
BRSABV Ekana Cricket Stadium, Lucknow
Umpires: Dharmesh Bhardwaj and Pranav Joshi

- Chhattisgarh won the toss and elected to field.
- Impact Player Subs: Aishwarya Mourya for Ravi Kiran (Chhattisgarh) and Karan Lal for Ranjot Khaira (Bengal).

20 October 2022
Scorecard

Tamil Nadu; 161/6 (20 overs)	v	Chandigarh; 105 (18.1 overs)
Baba Aparajith 67 (55); Sandeep Sharma 3/14 (4 overs)		Bhagmender Lather 38* (35); Varun Chakravarthy 3/24 (4 overs)

Tamil Nadu won by 56 runs
BRSABV Ekana Cricket Stadium B, Lucknow
Umpires: VM Dhokre and Pashchim Pathak

- Chandigarh won the toss and elected to field.
- Impact Player Subs: Murugan Ashwin for Chezhian Harinishanth (Tamil Nadu) and Shivam Bhambri for Rohit Dhanda (Chandigarh).

20 October 2022
Scorecard

Jharkhand; 188/5 (20 overs)	v	Odisha; 117 (19.2 overs)
Ishan Kishan 102* (64); Tarani Sa 3/34 (4 overs)		Shantanu Mishra 54 (50); Shahbaz Nadeem 3/21 (4 overs)

Jharkhand won by 71 runs
BRSABV Ekana Cricket Stadium, Lucknow
Umpires: Dharmesh Bhardwaj and Pranav Joshi

- Odisha won the toss and elected to field.
- Manishi (Jharkhand) made his T20 debut.
- Impact Player Subs: Sameer Mohanty for Mustaq Beg (Odisha) and Vivekanand Tiwari for Kumar Suraj (Jharkhand).

=== Round 7 ===
22 October 2022
Scorecard

Sikkim; 58 (17 overs)	v	Jharkhand; 61/0 (6 overs)
Ashish Thapa 23 (25); Vikash Singh 2/10 (3 overs); Manishi 2/10 (3 overs)		Nazim Siddiqui 40* (24)

Jharkhand won by 10 wickets
BRSABV Ekana Cricket Stadium, Lucknow
Umpires: Dharmesh Bhardwaj and Pranav Joshi

- Jharkhand won the toss and elected to field.
- Chitiz Tamang (Sikkim) made his T20 debut.
- Impact Player Subs: Chitiz Tamang for Pankaj Kumar Rawat (Sikkim) and Supriyo Chakraborty for Vikash Singh (Jharkhand).

22 October 2022
Scorecard

Chhattisgarh; 167/7 (20 overs)	v	Odisha; 80 (17.3 overs)
Amandeep Khare 57 (46); Mustaq Beg 2/29 (4 overs)		Subhranshu Senapati 24 (36); Sumit Ruikar 3/22 (4 overs)

Chhattisgarh won by 87 runs
BRSABV Ekana Cricket Stadium B, Lucknow
Umpires: VM Dhokre and Pashchim Pathak

- Chhattisgarh won the toss and elected to bat.
- Om T. Munde (Odisha) and Prateek Yadav (Chhattisgarh) both made their T20 debuts.
- Impact Player Subs: Aishwarya Mourya for Prateek Yadav (Chhattisgarh) and Suryakant Pradhan for Tarani Sa (Odisha).

22 October 2022
Scorecard

Bengal; 135/8 (20 overs)	v	Chandigarh; 138/2 (17.1 overs)
Abhimanyu Easwaran 46 (42); Jagjit Singh 3/28 (3 overs)		Ankit Kaushik 57* (45); Akash Deep 1/14 (3 overs)

Chandigarh won by 8 wickets
BRSABV Ekana Cricket Stadium, Lucknow
Umpires: Dharmesh Bhardwaj and Pranav Joshi

- Chandigarh won the toss and elected to field.
- Geet Puri (Bengal) and Akshit Rana (Chandigarh) both made their T20 debuts.
- Impact Player Subs: Agniv Pan for Abhishek Porel (Bengal) and Yuvraj Chaudhary for Rohit Dhanda (Chandigarh).
