= Lyngdoh =

Lyngdoh is a surname. Notable people with the surname include:

- Ampareen Lyngdoh (born 1965), Indian politician, Member of the Legislative Assembly from Meghalaya, India
- B. B. Lyngdoh (1922–2003), long-serving Chief Minister of Meghalaya, India
- Banteidor Lyngdoh, People's Democratic Front politician from Meghalaya, India
- Chesterpoul Lyngdoh, Indian professional footballer
- Constantine Lyngdoh, Indian politician of the Hill State People's Democratic Party from Meghalaya, India
- Eugeneson Lyngdoh (born 1986), Indian footballer
- Hopingstone Lyngdoh (1929–2015), Indian politician, president of the Hill State People's Democratic Party (HSPDP)
- James Michael Lyngdoh (born 1939), Indian civil servant, Chief Election Commissioner of India
- Metbah Lyngdoh, United Democratic Party politician from Meghalaya, India
- Paul Lyngdoh, Indian politician and poet who was born in Shillong, Meghalaya, India
- Rowell Lyngdoh, Indian politician from the state of Meghalaya, India
- Shaisngi Lyngdoh (born 1988), Indian cricketer
- Victor Lyngdoh, since 2020, the Metropolitan Archbishop of the Roman Catholic Archdiocese of Shillong, Meghalaya, India
