= Nafees =

Nafees is a common name of South Asian descent. The feminine variant is Nafeesa.

Notable people with the name include:

Given name

- Nafees Ahmad (born 1980), Indian politician
- Sayed Nafees al-Hussaini (1933–2008), Pakistani Islamic scholar and calligrapher
- Nafees Fazal (born 1947), Indian politician
- Nafees Iqbal (born 1985), Bangladeshi cricketer
- Nafees Lyon (born 1996), American gridiron football player
- Nafees Siddique (born 1996), Indian cricketer
- Nafees Bin Zafar (born 1978), Bangladeshi software engineer

Surname

- Mariyam Nafees (born 1994), Pakistani actress
- Shahriar Nafees (born 1985), Bangladeshi cricketer
