= Sushil Kohli =

Indian swimmer and water polo player

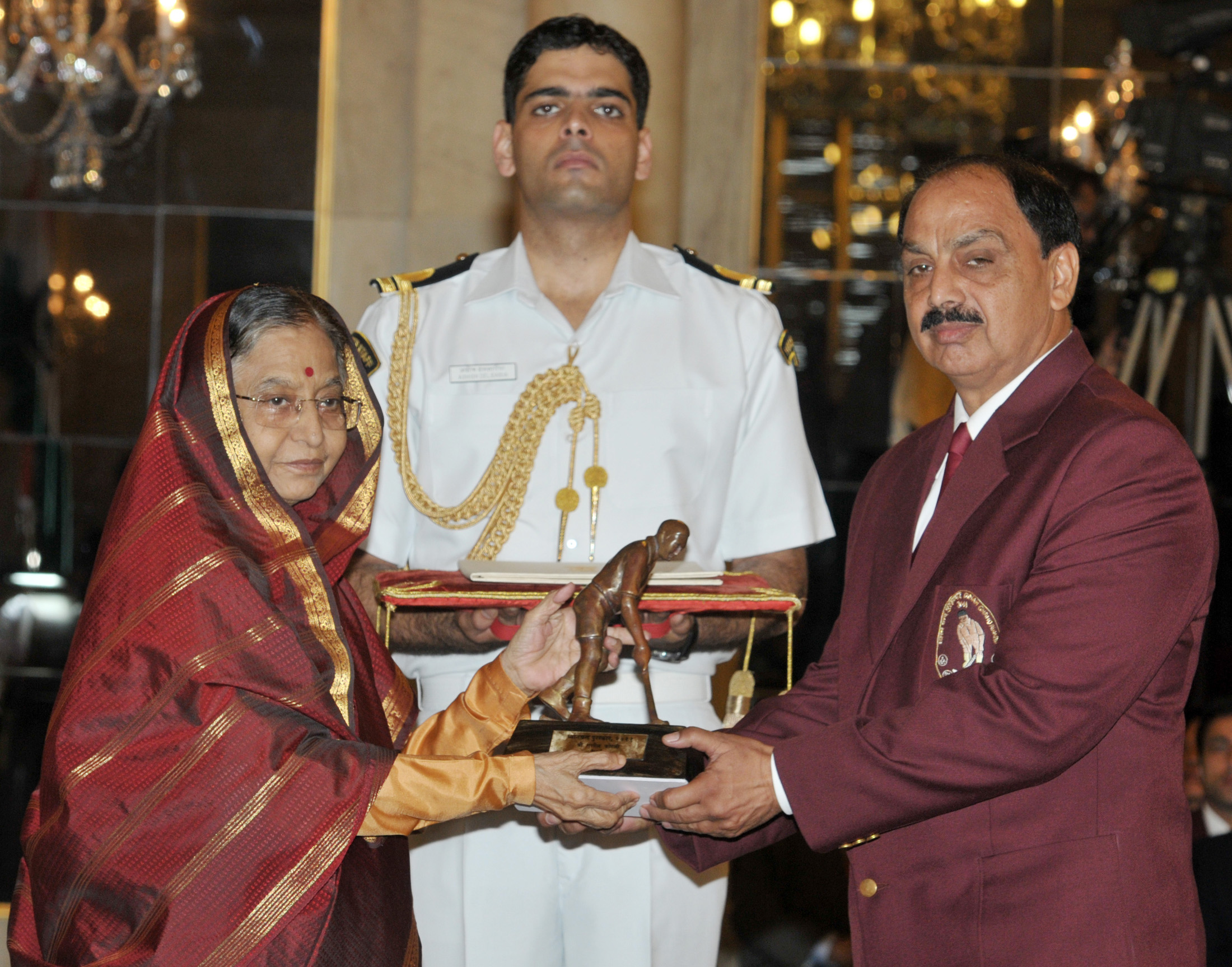
- Kohli (centre) presented with Dhyan Chand Award in 2011

Personal information
- Born: 19 April 1953 (age 73) Jalandhar, Punjab, India

Sport
- Sport: Water polo
Medal record
Representing India
Asian Games
Bronze medal – third place	1982 New Delhi	Men's tournament

Sushil Kohli (born 19 April 1953) is an Indian swimmer and water polo player. His father was the late Sh Mulkh Raj Kohli, who along with his brother late Sh Deshraj Kohli started the company Beat All Sports commonly known as BAS. He received a bronze medal at the 1982 Asian Games in New Delhi.

== Career ==
In 1980, when the first Asian Swimming Championships was held at Dhaka, he was the captain of the Indian team and won two silver medals. After his retirement from professional swimming, he started coaching youngsters in swimming and water polo, and later became general secretary of District Swimming Association of Jalandhar.

== Awards and recognition ==
He was awarded Maharaja Ranjit Singh Award for Swimming, given by Government of Punjab in 1978 and the Dhyan Chand Award, the highest award in Indian sports for lifetime achievement, given by Government of India in 2011.

== Personal life ==
He owns a sports manufacturing unit in Jalandhar, and his son Taruwar Kohli is a cricketer with Indian Premier League (IPL). He is the vice-president of Punjab Swimming Association, Member of the Selection Committee of Punjab Swimming Association Waterpolo Swimming, Honorary General Secretary District Swimming Association Jalandhar, Joint Secretary Shri Guru Gobind Singh Football Society REgd., Joint Secretary Ramesh Chander Memorial Hockey Society Regd.
