= Frederick Wright (cricketer) =

English cricketer

Personal information
- Full name: Frederick Wright
- Born: 20 June 1855; Sysonby, Leicestershire, England
- Died: 20 November 1929 (aged 74); Melton Mowbray, Leicestershire, England
- Batting: Right-handed
- Bowling: Right-arm fast

Domestic team information
- Years: Team
- 1895–1897: Leicestershire

Career statistics
Competition	First-class
Matches	5
Runs scored	110
Batting average	11.00
100s/50s	–/–
Top score	31
Balls bowled	675
Wickets	17
Bowling average	21.47
5 wickets in innings	1
10 wickets in match	–
Best bowling	5/78
Catches/stumpings	4/–
- Source: Cricinfo, 9 February 2013

Frederick Wright (20 June 1855 – 20 November 1929) was an English cricketer. Wright was a right-handed batsman who bowled right-arm fast. He was born at Sysonby, Leicestershire.

Wright made his first-class debut for Leicestershire against Derbyshire at Grace Road in the 1895 County Championship. He made four further first-class appearances for the county, the last of which came against Lancashire in the 1897 County Championship. In his five matches, Wright scored 110 runs at an average of 11.00, with a high score of 31. With the ball, he took 17 wickets at a bowling average of 21.47, with best figures of 5/78. His only five wicket haul came against Derbyshire on debut. Wright was 40 years and 49 days old, the oldest bowler to take five wickets on debut until Santha Moorthy broke the record in February 2020.

He died at Melton Mowbray, Leicestershire on 20 November 1929.
