= Amrit Lubana =

Indian cricketer (born 1997)

Personal information
- Full name: Amrit Lal Ranjit Lubana
- Born: 22 April 1997 (age 29); Chandigarh, India
- Batting: Right-handed
- Bowling: Right arm off break

Domestic team information
- Years: Team
- 2021–present: Chandigarh
- Source: ESPNcricinfo, 13 January 2021

Amrit Lubana (born 22 April 1997) is an Indian cricketer.

== Career ==
He made his Twenty20 debut on 13 January 2021, for Chandigarh in the 2020–21 Syed Mushtaq Ali Trophy. He made his List A debut on 9 December 2021, for Chandigarh in the 2021–22 Vijay Hazare Trophy. He made his first-class debut on 24 February 2022, for Chandigarh in the 2021–22 Ranji Trophy.

Lubana played a match winning knock in Syed Mustaq Ali Trophy and qualified for quarter-final against Bengal Cricket Association in 2024.
