= Nongthombam Ajit Singh =

Indian cricketer (born 1993)

Ajit Singh
Personal information
- Full name: Nongthombam Ajit Singh
- Born: 31 December 1993 (age 32); Imphal, Manipur
- Batting: Right-handed
- Role: Wicketkeeper

Domestic team information
- Years: Team
- 2019–20: Manipur
- Source: ESPNcricinfo, 19 January 2020

Nongthombam Ajit Singh (born 31 December 1993) is an Indian cricketer. He made his first-class debut on 19 January 2020, for Manipur in the 2019–20 Ranji Trophy.
