= Sagolsem Sunil Singh =

Indian cricketer (born 1987)

Sunil Singh
Personal information
- Full name: Sagolsem Sunil Singh
- Born: 1 March 1987 (age 39)
- Source: Cricinfo, 12 February 2020

Sagolsem Sunil Singh (born 1 March 1987) is an Indian cricketer. He made his first-class debut on 12 February 2020, for Manipur in the 2019–20 Ranji Trophy.
