= Tengchan Sangma =

Indian cricketer (born 1991)

Personal information
- Born: 18 May 1991 (age 35); West Garo Hills, Meghalaya
- Source: Cricinfo, 16 October 2019

Tengchan Sangma (born 18 May 1991) is an Indian cricketer. He made his List A debut on 14 October 2019, for Meghalaya in the 2019–20 Vijay Hazare Trophy. He made his first-class debut on 26 December 2019, for Meghalaya in the 2019–20 Ranji Trophy.
