= Shresth Nirmohi =

Indian cricketer (born 1991)

Personal information
- Full name: Shresth Nirmohi
- Born: 2 November 1991 (age 35)

Domestic team information
- Years: Team
- 2015-19: Himachal Pradesh
- 2019-present: Chandigarh
- Source: Cricinfo, 15 October 2015

Shresth Nirmohi (born 2 November 1991) is an Indian cricketer who plays for Chandigarh. He made his first class debut in the 2015–16 Ranji Trophy on 15 October 2015. He made his List A debut for Himachal Pradesh in the 2016–17 Vijay Hazare Trophy on 6 March 2017.
