= Wallam Kynshi =

Indian cricketer (born 1989)

Personal information
- Full name: Wallam John Lyngdoh Kynshi
- Born: 23 May 1989 (age 37); Shillong, Meghalaya
- Source: Cricinfo, 16 October 2019

Wallam Kynshi (born 23 May 1989) is an Indian cricketer. He made his List A debut on 14 October 2019, for Meghalaya in the 2019–20 Vijay Hazare Trophy. He made his first-class debut on 9 December 2019, for Meghalaya in the 2019–20 Ranji Trophy.
