= Ruben Lepcha =

Indian cricketer (born 1988)

Personal information
- Born: 2 January 1988 (age 38); Namchi, Sikkim
- Source: Cricinfo, 11 January 2020

Ruben Lepcha (born 2 January 1988) is an Indian cricketer. He made his first-class debut on 11 January 2020, for Sikkim in the 2019–20 Ranji Trophy.
