= Sheiteendra Singh =

Indian cricketer (born 1992)

Personal information
- Full name: Sheiteendra Yumnam Singh
- Born: 1 February 1992 (age 34)
- Batting: Right handed
- Bowling: Right arm medium

Domestic team information
- Years: Team
- 2019–20: Manipur
- Source: Cricinfo, 12 February 2020

Sheiteendra Yumnam Singh (born 1 February 1992) is an Indian cricketer. He made his first-class debut on 12 February 2020, for Manipur in the 2019–20 Ranji Trophy.
