= Shasheem Rathour =

Indian cricketer (born 1994)

Personal information
- Full name: Shasheem Sanjay Rathour
- Born: 16 October 1994 (age 32); Patna, Bihar, India
- Source: Cricinfo, 10 January 2016

Shasheem Rathour (born 16 October 1994) is an Indian cricketer who plays for Jharkhand. He made his Twenty20 debut on 7 January 2016 in the 2015–16 Syed Mushtaq Ali Trophy. He made his List A debut for Jharkhand in the 2016–17 Vijay Hazare Trophy on 6 March 2017.
