= Sunil Salam =

Indian cricketer (born 1996)

Personal information
- Full name: Sunil Singh Dhananjoy Salam
- Born: 1 March 1996 (age 30)
- Source: Cricinfo, 12 February 2020

Sunil Singh Dhananjoy Salam (born 1 March 1996) is an Indian cricketer. He made his first-class debut on 12 February 2020, for Manipur in the 2019–20 Ranji Trophy. He made his Twenty20 debut on 9 November 2021, for Manipur in the 2021–22 Syed Mushtaq Ali Trophy.
