= Walling Imomenba =

Indian cricketer

Personal information
- Full name: Walling Imomenba
- Source: Cricinfo, 12 February 2020

Walling Imomenba is an Indian cricketer. He made his first-class debut on 12 February 2020, for Nagaland in the 2019–20 Ranji Trophy.
