= Rakesh Pattnaik =

Indian cricketer (born 1992)

Personal information
- Born: 30 June 1992 (age 34); Khordha, Odisha, India
- Batting: Right-handed
- Bowling: Right-arm offbreak

Domestic team information
- Years: Team
- 2020/21: Odisha
- Source: Cricinfo, 26 February 2021

Rakesh Pattnaik (born 30 June 1992) is an Indian cricketer. He made his List A debut on 26 February 2021, for Odisha in the 2020–21 Vijay Hazare Trophy.
