= Sultan Karim =

Indian cricketer (born 1994)

Personal information
- Born: 17 November 1994 (age 31); Imphal, Manipur, India
- Source: Cricinfo, 20 September 2018

Sultan Karim (born 17 November 1994) is an Indian cricketer. He made his List A debut for Manipur in the 2018–19 Vijay Hazare Trophy on 20 September 2018. He made his first-class debut for Manipur in the 2018–19 Ranji Trophy on 1 November 2018. He made his Twenty20 debut for Manipur in the 2018–19 Syed Mushtaq Ali Trophy on 24 February 2019.
