= Kunal Mahajan =

Indian cricketer (born 1991)

Personal information
- Born: 6 August 1991 (age 35)
- Source: ESPNcricinfo, 17 November 2019

Kunal Mahajan (born 6 August 1991) is an Indian cricketer. He made his Twenty20 debut on 17 November 2019, for Chandigarh in the 2019–20 Syed Mushtaq Ali Trophy. He made his first-class debut on 4 February 2020, for Chandigarh in the 2019–20 Ranji Trophy. He made his List A debut on 8 December 2021, for Chandigarh in the 2021–22 Vijay Hazare Trophy.
