= Lalruatdika =

Indian cricketer (born 1996)

Personal information
- Full name: Lalruatdika Lalsim
- Born: 12 September 1996 (age 30); Ramhlun South, Aizawl, Mizoram
- Source: ESPNcricinfo, 16 October 2019

Lalruatdika Lalsim (born 12 September 1996) is an Indian cricketer. He made his List A debut on 8 October 2018, for Mizoram in the 2019–20 Vijay Hazare Trophy. He made his first-class debut on 3 January 2020, for Mizoram in the 2019–20 Ranji Trophy.
