= Suri Gopalakrishna =

Indian cricketer (born 1943)

Personal information
- Born: 26 June 1943 (age 83); Kolar Gold Fields, Mysore, India
- Batting: Right-handed
- Bowling: Right-arm medium

Domestic team information
- Years: Team
- 1965/66: Bihar
- 1967/68–1974/75: Kerala

Career statistics
Competition	First-class
Matches	19
Runs scored	948
Batting average	27.08
100s/50s	1/2
Top score	100
Balls bowled	216
Wickets	3
Bowling average	39.33
5 wickets in innings	0
10 wickets in match	0
Best bowling	1/14
Catches/stumpings	7/–
- Source: CricketArchive, 6 February 2017

Suri Gopalakrishna (born 26 June 1943) is a former cricketer who played first-class cricket in India from 1965 to 1974.

Gopalakrishna was born in Mysore, where he grew up, but he made his first-class debut for Bihar, playing two matches for them in 1965–66. He moved to Kerala to work with the State Bank of Travancore, and after playing for the bank's cricket team in the local competition he was selected to play for Kerala in 1967–68.

He had his best season in 1969–70, when he opened the innings and scored 359 runs in the Ranji Trophy at an average of 51.28, dominating Kerala's batting. He top-scored in five of Kerala's eight innings, and in the match against Madras he scored his only century.

Gopalakrishna played for Kerala till 1974–75. As of 2013, he lives in Hyderabad.
