= Shashwat Kohli =

Indian cricketer (born 1997)

Personal information
- Born: 2 May 1997 (age 29); New Delhi
- Source: Cricinfo, 24 September 2019

Shashwat Kohli (born 2 May 1997) is an Indian cricketer. He made his List A debut on 24 September 2019, for Arunachal Pradesh in the 2019–20 Vijay Hazare Trophy. He made his Twenty20 debut on 8 November 2019, for Arunachal Pradesh in the 2019–20 Syed Mushtaq Ali Trophy. He made his first-class debut on 11 January 2020, for Arunachal Pradesh in the 2019–20 Ranji Trophy.
