= Gaurav Puri =

Indian cricketer (born 1991)

Personal information
- Born: 28 July 1991 (age 35)
- Source: ESPNcricinfo, 10 October 2019

Gaurav Puri (born 28 July 1991) is an Indian cricketer. He made his List A debut on 10 October 2019, for Chandigarh in the 2019–20 Vijay Hazare Trophy. He made his Twenty20 debut on 8 November 2019, for Chandigarh in the 2019–20 Syed Mushtaq Ali Trophy. He made his first-class debut on 17 February 2022, for Chandigarh in the 2021–22 Ranji Trophy.
