= Amit Verma =

Indian cricketer (born 1987)

Personal information
- Born: 30 August 1988 (age 38); Bangalore, Karnataka, India
- Batting: Left-handed
- Bowling: Leg break
- Role: Batsman

Domestic team information
- Years: Team
- 2006/07–2014: Karnataka
- 2014/15: Kerala
- 2015/16–present: Assam

Career statistics
Competition	FC	LA	T20
Matches	35	20	8
Runs scored	2,229	345	39
Batting average	45.48	26.53	19.50
100s/50s	7/10	0/1	0/0
Top score	173	85	29
Balls bowled	1,803	528	30
Wickets	17	4	2
Bowling average	52.35	117.50	21.50
5 wickets in innings	0	0	0
10 wickets in match	0	0	0
Best bowling	2/20	2/45	2/17
Catches/stumpings	21/0	6/–	4/-
- Source: ESPNcricinfo, 1 December 2012

Amit Verma (born 30 August 1987) is an Indian cricketer. He is a left-hander batsman and leg-break bowler. Verma made his first-class debut for Karnataka against Delhi in 2007–08 Ranji Trophy.

Ahead of the 2018–19 Ranji Trophy, he transferred from Assam to Goa. He was the leading run-scorer for Goa in the tournament, with 549 runs in nine matches.
