= Karkir Taye =

Indian cricketer (born 1995)

Personal information
- Born: 13 December 1995 (age 30)
- Source: ESPNcricinfo, 2 October 2019

Karkir Taye (born 13 December 1995) is an Indian cricketer. He made his List A debut on 2 October 2019, for Arunachal Pradesh in the 2019–20 Vijay Hazare Trophy. He made his Twenty20 debut on 15 November 2019, for Arunachal Pradesh in the 2019–20 Syed Mushtaq Ali Trophy. He made his first-class debut on 9 December 2019, for Arunachal Pradesh in the 2019–20 Ranji Trophy.
