= Puran Giri =

Indian cricketer (born 1986)

Personal information
- Full name: Puran Kishor Giri
- Born: 22 April 1986 (age 40); Gangtok, Sikkim
- Source: Cricinfo, 11 January 2020

Puran Giri (born 22 April 1986) is an Indian cricketer. He made his first-class debut on 11 January 2020, for Sikkim in the 2019–20 Ranji Trophy.
