= Karam Dharmendra =

Indian cricketer (born 1992)

Personal information
- Full name: Karam Dharmendra Meitei
- Born: 20 December 1992 (age 33)

Domestic team information
- Years: Team
- 2020: Manipur
- Source: ESPNcricinfo, 3 January 2020

Karam Dharmendra Meitei (born 20 December 1992) is an Indian cricketer. He made his first-class debut on 3 January 2020, for Manipur in the 2019–20 Ranji Trophy.
