= K. B. Pawan =

Indian cricketer (born 1987)

KB Pawan
Personal information
- Full name: Kolar Balasubramanya Pawan
- Born: 19 December 1987 (age 38); Bangalore, Karnataka, India
- Batting: Right-handed
- Role: Opening batsman

Domestic team information
- Years: Team
- 2006–2013: Karnataka
- 2013–2014: Tripura
- 2014–2018: Kerala
- 2018–2019: Nagaland
- 2019–2021: Mizoram
- 2021–present: Tripura

Career statistics
Competition	FC	LA	T20
Matches	78	36	23
Runs scored	4,475	1,294	484
Batting average	35.23	56.26	30.25
100s/50s	12/19	5/6	0/3
Top score	251*	113*	72*
Balls bowled	228	–	–
Wickets	3	–	–
Bowling average	143.00	–	–
5 wickets in innings	0	–	–
10 wickets in match	0	–	–
Best bowling	1/10	–	–
Catches/stumpings	75/5	25/4	7/3
- Source: ESPNcricinfo, 14 November 2024

Kolar Balasubramanya Pawan (born 19 December 1987) is an Indian cricketer who played for Karnataka in domestic cricket. He is a right-handed opening batsman.

Ahead of the 2018–19 Ranji Trophy, he transferred from Karnataka to Nagaland. He was the leading run-scorer for Nagaland in the 2018–19 Vijay Hazare Trophy, with 432 runs in eight matches. However, in July 2019, the Nagaland Cricket Association (NCA) released Pawan ahead of the 2019–20 cricket season, following a poor performance in the Syed Mushtaq Ali Trophy.
