= Pratik Desai =

Indian cricketer (born 1989)

Pratik Desai (born 25 December 1989) is an Indian cricketer. He is a right-handed batsman and leg-break bowler who plays Mizoram. He had previously played for Maharashtra & Services. He was born in Pune.

Desai made his cricketing debut for Maharashtra Under-17s in the 2006-07 Vijay Merchant Trophy in December 2006. He made his only first-class appearance in the same month, against Bengal. He scored a golden duck in the first innings in which he batted, and 4 runs in the second.

Desai made two Twenty20 appearances in April 2007, as Maharashtra finished bottom of their group.
