= Santha Moorthy =

Indian cricketer (born 1979)

Personal information
- Born: 10 September 1979 (age 47)
- Source: Cricinfo, 10 October 2019

Santha Moorthy (born 10 September 1979) is an Indian cricketer. He made his List A debut on 10 October 2019, for Puducherry in the 2019–20 Vijay Hazare Trophy. He made his Twenty20 debut on 18 November 2019, for Puducherry in the 2019–20 Syed Mushtaq Ali Trophy.

He made his first-class debut on 12 February 2020, for Puducherry in the 2019–20 Ranji Trophy. In the match, he took a five-wicket haul, and at the age of 40 years and 155 days, became the oldest bowler to take five wickets on debut. The previous record was set 125 years earlier, when Fred Wright took five wickets for Leicestershire against Derbyshire in the 1895 County Championship in England, when Wright was 40 years and 49 days old on debut.
