= Felix Alemao =

Indian cricketer (born 1995)

Personal information
- Full name: Felix Bernado Alemao
- Born: 20 July 1995 (age 31); Margao, Goa, India
- Batting: Right-handed
- Bowling: Right arm medium
- Role: Bowler

Domestic team information
- Years: Team
- 2016–17: Goa
- Source: ESPNcricinfo, 13 October 2016

Felix Bernado Alemao (born 20 July 1995) is an Indian cricketer. He made his first-class debut for Goa in the 2016–17 Ranji Trophy on 13 October 2016. He made his List A debut for Goa in the 2016–17 Vijay Hazare Trophy on 28 February 2017.
