= Vino Zhimomi =

Indian cricketer (born 1995)

Personal information
- Full name: Vino Ghoito Zhimomi
- Born: 11 October 1995 (age 31); Dimapur, Nagaland, India
- Source: Cricinfo, 25 December 2019

Vino Zhimomi (born 11 October 1995) is an Indian cricketer. He made his first-class debut on 25 December 2019, for Nagaland in the 2019–20 Ranji Trophy.
