= Vaibhav Govekar =

Indian cricketer (born 1997)

Personal information
- Full name: Vaibhav Vijaykumar Govekar
- Born: 20 October 1997 (age 29); Belgaum, Karnataka, India
- Source: Cricinfo, 2 March 2019

Vaibhav Govekar (born 20 October 1997) is an Indian cricketer. He made his Twenty20 debut for Goa in the 2018–19 Syed Mushtaq Ali Trophy on 2 March 2019. He made his List A debut on 26 September 2019, for Goa in the 2019–20 Vijay Hazare Trophy. He made his first-class debut on 3 January 2020, for Goa in the 2019–20 Ranji Trophy.
