= Jaskaranvir Singh =

Indian cricketer (born 1993)

Personal information
- Born: 21 September 1993 (age 33)
- Batting: Right-handed
- Role: Wicketkeeper

Domestic team information
- Years: Team
- 2014–15: Punjab
- Source: ESPNcricinfo, 29 January 2017

Jaskaranvir Singh (born 21 September 1993) is an Indian cricketer. He made his Twenty20 debut for Punjab in the 2014–15 Syed Mushtaq Ali Trophy on 24 March 2015. He made his List A debut on 1 October 2019, for Chandigarh in the 2019–20 Vijay Hazare Trophy. He made his first-class debut on 19 January 2020, for Chandigarh in the 2019–20 Ranji Trophy.
