= Nabam Tempol =

Indian cricketer (born 1994)

Personal information
- Born: 25 September 1994 (age 32); Upper Tubung, Balijan, Papum Pare, Arunachal Pradesh
- Batting: Right-handed
- Bowling: Right arm medium fast
- Role: Bowler

Domestic team information
- Years: Team
- 2019–20: Arunachal Pradesh
- Source: ESPNcricinfo, 12 November 2019

Nabam Tempol (born 25 September 1994) is an Indian cricketer. He made his Twenty20 debut on 12 November 2019, for Arunachal Pradesh in the 2019–20 Syed Mushtaq Ali Trophy. He made his first-class debut on 3 January 2020, for Arunachal Pradesh in the 2019–20 Ranji Trophy. He made his List A debut on 25 February 2021, for Arunachal Pradesh in the 2020–21 Vijay Hazare Trophy.
