= Purajit Mandal =

Indian cricketer (born 1981)

Personal information
- Full name: Purajit Jiban Mandal
- Born: 21 October 1981 (age 45); Shillong, Meghalaya
- Source: Cricinfo, 19 January 2020

Purajit Mandal (born 21 October 1981) is an Indian cricketer. He made his first-class debut on 19 January 2020, for Meghalaya in the 2019–20 Ranji Trophy.
