= Shamir Khan =

Indian cricketer (born 1996)

Personal information
- Full name: Mohammed Shamir Khan
- Born: 1 April 1996 (age 30)
- Source: Cricinfo, 4 February 2020

Shamir Khan (born 1 April 1996) is an Indian cricketer. He made his first-class debut on 4 February 2020, for Manipur in the 2019–20 Ranji Trophy.
