= Rajkumar Jotish =

Indian cricketer (born 1992)

Personal information
- Full name: Rajkumar Jotish Singh
- Born: 29 October 1992 (age 34)
- Source: Cricinfo, 19 January 2020

Rajkumar Jotish Singh (born 29 October 1992) is an Indian cricketer. He made his first-class debut on 19 January 2020, for Manipur in the 2019–20 Ranji Trophy.
