= G. Lalbiakvela =

Indian cricketer (born 1988)

G Lalbiakvela
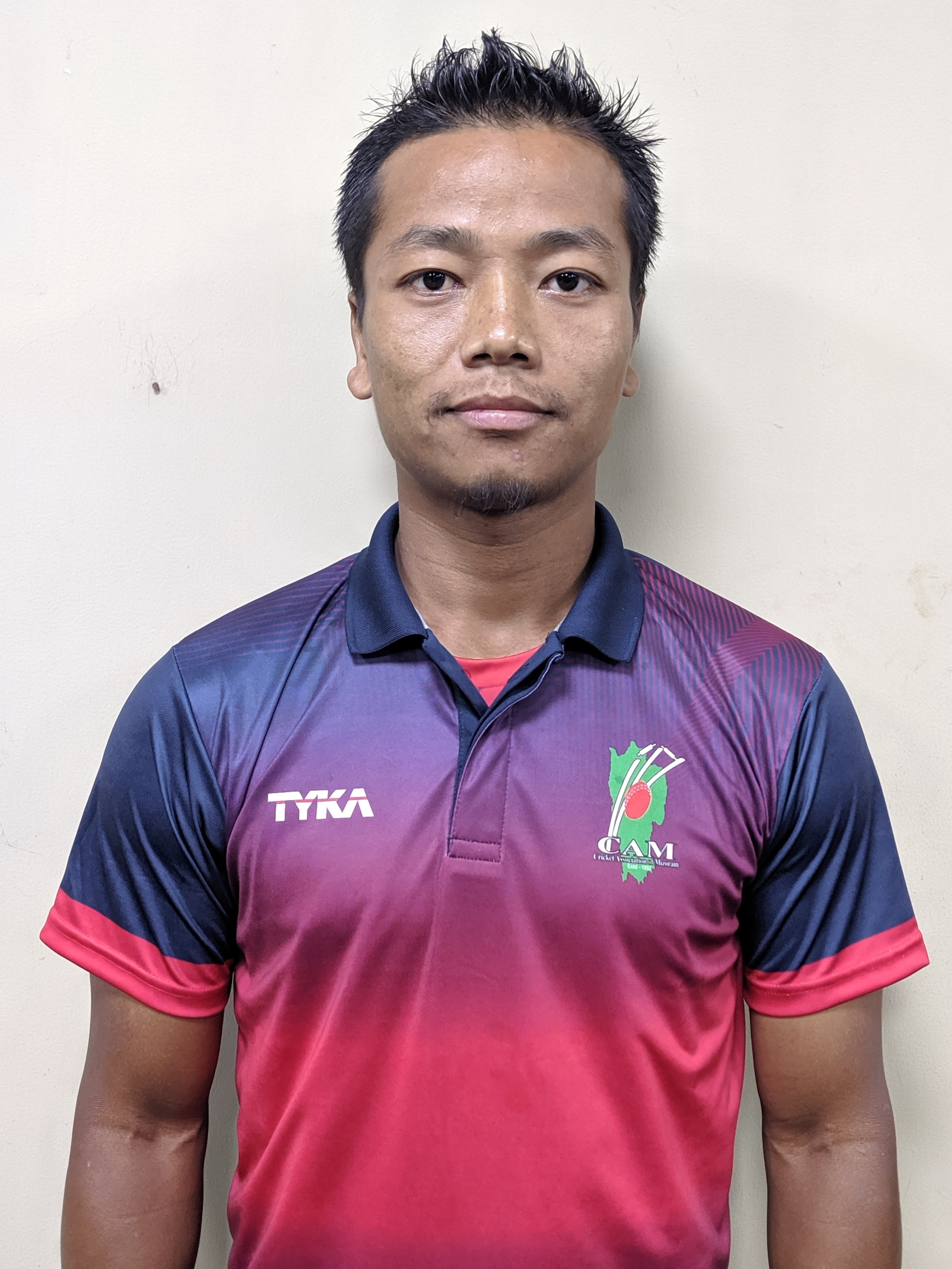

Personal information
- Born: 28 January 1988 (age 38)
- Batting: Right-handed
- Bowling: Right arm medium
- Source: ESPNcricinfo, 3 October 2019

G Lalbiakvela (born 28 January 1988) is an Indian cricketer. He made his List A debut on 19 September 2018, for Mizoram in the 2018–19 Vijay Hazare Trophy. He made his first-class debut on 1 November 2018, for Mizoram in the 2018–19 Ranji Trophy. He made his Twenty20 debut on 21 February 2019, also for Mizoram, in the 2018–19 Syed Mushtaq Ali Trophy.
