= Sanjay Yadav (cricketer) =

Indian cricketer (born 1995)

Personal information
- Full name: Ramsingh Sanjay Yadav
- Born: 10 May 1995 (age 31); Gorakhpur, Uttar Pradesh, India
- Batting: Left-handed
- Bowling: Slow left-arm orthodox
- Role: Batting all-rounder

Domestic team information
- Years: Team
- 2016/17–2018/19, 2021/22–2023/24: Tamil Nadu
- 2019/20–2020/21: Meghalaya
- 2022: Mumbai Indians
- Source: ESPNcricinfo

Ramsingh Sanjay Yadav (born 10 May 1995) is an Indian cricketer who plays for Tamil Nadu in domestic cricket. He is a batting all-rounder who bats left-handed and bowls slow left-arm orthodox.

He moved to Meghalaya cricket team ahead of the 2019–2020 season as a professional. He made his List A debut on 24 September 2019, for Meghalaya in the 2019–20 Vijay Hazare Trophy. He made his first-class debut on 9 December 2019, for Meghalaya in the 2019–20 Ranji Trophy. In the first innings of the match, he took nine wickets for 52 runs. They were the third-best figures in Indian domestic first-class cricket.

In February 2022, he was bought by the Mumbai Indians in the auction for the 2022 Indian Premier League tournament.

In TNPL 2022 edition Sanjay Yadav scored his maiden hundred against Ruby Trichy Warriors 103(55)* in T20 format.
