= Imliwati Lemtur =

Indian cricketer (born 1991)

Personal information
- Full name: Imliwati Meren Lemtur
- Born: 25 December 1991 (age 34); Dimapur, Nagaland
- Batting: Left-handed
- Bowling: Slow left arm orthodox
- Role: Bowling all-rounder

Domestic team information
- Years: Team
- 2018/19–present: Nagaland

Career statistics
| Competition | FC | LA | T20 |
|---|---|---|---|
| Matches | 41 | 46 | 33 |
| Runs scored | 811 | 336 | 166 |
| Batting average | 14.22 | 12.00 | 9.22 |
| 100s/50s | 0/4 | 0/0 | 0/0 |
| Top score | 61 | 45* | 20 |
| Balls bowled | 7,027 | 2,028 | 569 |
| Wickets | 121 | 51 | 26 |
| Bowling average | 31.96 | 30.58 | 26.46 |
| 5 wickets in innings | 6 | 0 | 0 |
| 10 wickets in match | 1 | 0 | 0 |
| Best bowling | 7/25 | 4/23 | 4/20 |
| Catches/stumpings | 13/– | 9/– | 7/– |
- Source: ESPNcricinfo, 19 September 2024

Imliwati Lemtur (born 25 December 1991) is an Indian cricketer. He plays for Nagaland as a bowling All-rounder.

He made his List A debut for Nagaland in the 2018–19 Vijay Hazare Trophy on 19 September 2018. He was the leading wicket-taker for Nagaland in the 2018–19 Vijay Hazare Trophy, with ten dismissals in seven matches. He made his first-class debut for Nagaland in the 2018–19 Ranji Trophy on 1 November 2018. He made his Twenty20 debut for Nagaland in the 2018–19 Syed Mushtaq Ali Trophy on 21 February 2019.
