= Kengo Bam =

Indian cricketer (born 1996)

Personal information
- Full name: Kengo Goken Bam
- Born: 10 September 1996 (age 30)
- Source: ESPNcricinfo, 8 November 2019

Kengo Bam (born 10 September 1996) is an Indian cricketer. He made his Twenty20 debut on 8 November 2019, for Arunachal Pradesh in the 2019–20 Syed Mushtaq Ali Trophy. He made his first-class debut on 9 December 2019, for Arunachal Pradesh in the 2019–20 Ranji Trophy. He made his List A debut on 12 December 2021, for Arunachal Pradesh in the 2021–22 Vijay Hazare Trophy.
