= Shivam Kumar =

Indian cricketer (born 2000)

Personal information
- Full name: Shivam Sanjay Kumar
- Born: 7 August 2000 (age 26); Arwal, Bihar, India
- Batting: Right-handed
- Bowling: Legbreak googly

Domestic team information
- Years: Team
- 2019–present: Bihar
- Source: Cricinfo, 10 October 2019

Shivam Kumar (born 7 August 2000) is an Indian cricketer. He is a Right hand Batsman and legbreak Googly bowler. He made his List A debut on 7 October 2019, for Bihar in the 2019–20 Vijay Hazare Trophy. He made his Twenty20 debut on 8 November 2019, for Bihar in the 2019–20 Syed Mushtaq Ali Trophy. He made his first-class debut on 9 December 2019, for Bihar in the 2019–20 Ranji Trophy.
