= Taruwar Kohli =

Indian Domestic cricketer

Personal information
- Full name: Taruwar Sushil Kohli
- Born: 17 December 1988 (age 37); Jalandhar, Punjab, India
- Batting: Right-handed
- Bowling: Right arm medium

Domestic team information
- Years: Team
- 2008: Rajasthan Royals
- 2009: Kings XI Punjab

Career statistics
Competition	FC	LA	T20
Matches	55	72	57
Runs scored	4,573	1,913	1057
Batting average	53.80	39.85	24.58
100s/50s	14/18	3/11	0/7
Top score	307*	127	90
Balls bowled	4,158	1420	495
Wickets	74	41	18
Bowling average	30.22	34.47	41.55
5 wickets in innings	3	2	0
10 wickets in match	0	0	0
Best bowling	6/52	6/65	3/19
Catches/stumpings	34/–	24/–	16/–
- Source: ESPNcricinfo, 19 February 2024

Taruwar Sushil Kohli (born 17 December 1988) is an Indian former cricketer. He was a right-handed batsman and a right-arm fast bowler. He scored two triple-centuries in first-class cricket.

In domestic cricket, he appeared with ONGC.

== Early life and education ==
Kohli was born on 17 December 1988 in Jalandhar, Punjab to Sushil Kohli and Meenu Kohli. His father was an international swimmer and water polo player.

== Career ==
Kohli made his debut for Punjab Under-17s in the Vijay Merchant Trophy competition of 2005/06, making five appearances in the competition, and scoring 85* on his debut in a drawn three-day match. Kohli's good form continued throughout the tournament, as he top-scored with 110 in the penultimate match.

Kohli was a member of the Indian u-19 Team, which became world cup winners in 2008. As he scored 218 runs in 6 matches which included 3 consecutive fifties, he was the third high scorer of the tournament.

Before the world cup, he captained the Punjab U-19 team which won the one day tournament. He scored unbeaten 118 and took 5 wickets in the semi-finals against Utaar Pradesh.

He scored 79 in his Ranji Trophy debut in 2008/09 session and 58 in his one-day debut. He scored 700 runs in 7 matches in Colonel Naidu Trophy with three hundreds.(196, 145 & 127). In Kings XI Cup organised by Kings XI Punjab (KXP), he was awarded as the best batsman of the tournament with three man of the match awards. He played two matches for KXP during IPL 2009.

He was captain of Punjab U-22 team in 2010/11 season. He played in T-20 D.Y Patil tournament in 2011 for ONGC and his performance includes the following: - a) Against Canara Bank: He took 3 wickets for 18 runs in his 4 overs.

b) Against TATA: scored 48 not out in 28 balls and took 1 wicket for 18 runs in 3 overs.

c) Against AIR India (quarter-final): Scored 24 runs in 19 balls and took 4 wickets for 20 runs in 4 overs.

d) Against Indian Oil (semi-final): Scored 23 runs in 13 balls and took 2 wickets for 21 runs in 3 overs.

He played all the matches for Punjab in the Vijay Hazare Cricket One Day Cricket as an All Rounder. He is fast-paced bowler.

2011-2012: 1) 18th Dr.D.Y Patil T-20 Cricket Tournament: 43 runs notout in 30 balls against Air India bowling 4 overs 32 runs 1 wicket. 20 runs in 7 balls against Western Railways. 60 out of 50 balls (Nout Out) against MRF. 2) J.P Attrray Cricket tournament at Mohali in 2011: 42 runs against MRF. 40 runs against Indian Oil. 65 not out against Mohali XI in the Finals, won the tournament.

He played one Ranji match in 2011–2012 played T-20 matches from Punjab 2011–12. Bowling 4/28/1 against Haryana. Bowling 4/24 against Delhi. Bowling 3/15 against Himachal Pradesh. Batting 20 runs against Services.

He played in the Vinoo Mankad Trophy for the Under-19s team in 2006, and in the Cooch Behar Trophy competition of the same year.

Kohli was made a part of the Indian Under-19s World Cup winning squad in February and March 2008 - which won in the final against the South African team - despite Kohli being dismissed for just a single run in the final.

In IPL 2008, Kohli played for Rajasthan Royals in the Indian Premier League. In the second edition of the IPL Kohli represented the Yuvraj Singh led Kings XI Punjab

Against J&K he scored 31 runs in 26 balls with two sixers. He bowled 6 overs giving 25 and took one wicket. Against Himachal Pradesh he scored 31 runs in 30 balls with two sixes. He also took one catch. Against Services he scored 7 runs not out and took one catch. he played the Pre-Quarter-Final match against Mahhrashtra on 5 March at Delhi for Vijay Hazare trophy. He scored 46 runs and played 86 runs partnership with Harbhajan Singh and won the match against Maharashtra. He will now play against Hyedrabad on 7th of march at Delhi in Quarterfinals.

He was the leading run-scorer for Mizoram in the 2018–19 Vijay Hazare Trophy, with 373 runs in seven matches. He was also the leading wicket-taker, with eight dismissals.

Kohli announced his retirement in 2024. He finished with a first-class average of 53.80.
