= Yashasvi Rishav =

Indian cricketer (born 1997)

Personal information
- Born: 27 September 1997 (age 29)
- Source: Cricinfo, 27 January 2020

Yashasvi Rishav (born 27 September 1997) is an Indian cricketer. He made his first-class debut on 27 January 2020, for Bihar in the 2019–20 Ranji Trophy, scoring 150 runs in the second innings. He made his List A debut on 24 February 2021, for Bihar in the 2020–21 Vijay Hazare Trophy. He made his Twenty20 debut on 4 November 2021, for Bihar in the 2021–22 Syed Mushtaq Ali Trophy.
