= Shaisngi Lyngdoh =

Indian cricketer (born 1988)

Personal information
- Born: 21 November 1988 (age 37); Shillong, Meghalaya
- Source: Cricinfo, 4 February 2020

Shaisngi Lyngdoh (born 21 November 1988) is an Indian cricketer. He made his first-class debut on 4 February 2020, for Meghalaya in the 2019–20 Ranji Trophy.
