= Vivek Kumar =

Indian cricketer (born 1994)

Personal information
- Full name: Vivek Kumar
- Born: 26 October 2003 (age 23)

Domestic team information
- Years: Team
- 2018-present: Bihar
- Source: Cricinfo, 14 August 2021

Vivek Kumar (born 8 December 1994) is an Indian cricketer. He made his first-class debut for Bihar in the 2018–19 Ranji Trophy on 20 November 2018. He made his Twenty20 debut for Bihar in the 2018–19 Syed Mushtaq Ali Trophy on 22 February 2019. He made his List A debut on 25 September 2019, for Bihar in the 2019–20 Vijay Hazare Trophy.
