= Thomas Moirangthem =

Indian cricketer (born 1995)

Personal information
- Full name: Moirangthem Thomas Singh
- Born: 1 November 1995 (age 31); Imphal West, Manipur
- Source: Cricinfo, 12 October 2019

Moirangthem Thomas Singh (born 1 November 1995) is an Indian cricketer. He made his List A debut on 11 October 2019, for Manipur in the 2019–20 Vijay Hazare Trophy. He made his Twenty20 debut on 11 November 2019, for Manipur in the 2019–20 Syed Mushtaq Ali Trophy. He made his first-class debut on 17 December 2019, for Manipur in the 2019–20 Ranji Trophy.
