= Jayanta Sagatpam =

Indian cricketer (born 1992)

Jayanta Sagatpam Singh
Personal information
- Full name: Jayanta Sagatpam Singh
- Born: 12 October 1992 (age 34); Imphal, Manipur
- Batting: Right-handed
- Bowling: Right-arm offbreak
- Role: Middle order batter

Domestic team information
- Years: Team
- 2018/19: Manipur
- Source: ESPNcricinfo, 20 September 2018

Jayanta Sagatpam Singh (born 12 October 1992) is an Indian cricketer. He made his List A debut for Manipur in the 2018–19 Vijay Hazare Trophy on 20 September 2018. He made his first-class debut for Manipur in the 2018–19 Ranji Trophy on 1 November 2018. He made his Twenty20 debut on 11 November 2019, for Manipur in the 2019–20 Syed Mushtaq Ali Trophy.
