= Shivam Bhambri =

Indian cricketer (born 1995)

Personal information
- Born: 30 September 1995 (age 31)
- Batting: Right handed batsman
- Bowling: Off Break
- Source: Cricinfo, 25 September 2019

Shivam Bhambri (born 30 September 1995) is an Indian cricketer. He made his List A debut on 1 October 2019, for Chandigarh in the 2019–20 Vijay Hazare Trophy. He made his Twenty20 debut on 8 November 2019, for Chandigarh in the 2019–20 Syed Mushtaq Ali Trophy, scoring 106 runs from 57 balls. He made his first-class debut on 9 December 2019, for Chandigarh in the 2019–20 Ranji Trophy, scoring a century (105) in the first innings. He became the first cricketer to score a century on his Twenty20 and first-class debuts.
