= Puneet Bisht =

Indian cricketer (born 1986)

Personal information
- Born: 15 June 1986 (age 40); Delhi, India
- Role: Wicket-keeper

Domestic team information
- Years: Team
- 2006–2018: Delhi
- 2012–2012: Delhi Daredevils
- 2018–2023: Meghalaya

Career statistics
Competition	FC	LA	T20
Matches	88	86	49
Runs scored	3946	2239	642
Batting average	35.54	37.94	16.46
100s/50s	8/16	4/13	0/1
Top score	343	149	56
Balls bowled	30	18	–
Wickets	2	0	–
Bowling average	9.00	–	–
5 wickets in innings	0	–	–
10 wickets in match	0	–	–
Best bowling	2/18	–	–
Catches/stumpings	263/13	96/16	27/9
- Source: ESPNcricinfo, 26 December 2019

Puneet Bisht (born 15 June 1986) is a former Indian cricketer. He played as a wicket-keeper for Meghalaya in domestic cricket. He was a part of the Delhi Daredevils IPL team in 2012.

He was the leading run-scorer for Meghalaya in the 2018–19 Vijay Hazare Trophy, with 502 runs in eight matches. In December 2018, in the 2018–19 Ranji Trophy, he scored his maiden triple century in first-class cricket, batting for Meghalaya against Sikkim. This remains the highest first class score for a wicket keeper. He was the leading run-scorer for Meghalaya in the tournament, with 892 runs in eight matches.

Bisht announced his retirement from all forms of cricket on 2 August 2023. He is a qualified Level II coach.

== See also ==
- List of Ranji Trophy triple centuries
