= Nishant Kumar (cricketer) =

Indian cricketer (born 1988)

Personal information
- Born: 25 December 1988 (age 37)

Domestic team information
- Years: Team
- 2019-present: Bihar
- Source: ESPNcricinfo, 9 December 2019

Nishant Kumar (born 25 December 1988) is an Indian cricketer. He made his first-class debut on 9 December 2019, for Bihar in the 2019–20 Ranji Trophy.
