= Parvez Ahmed =

Indian cricketer (born 1996)

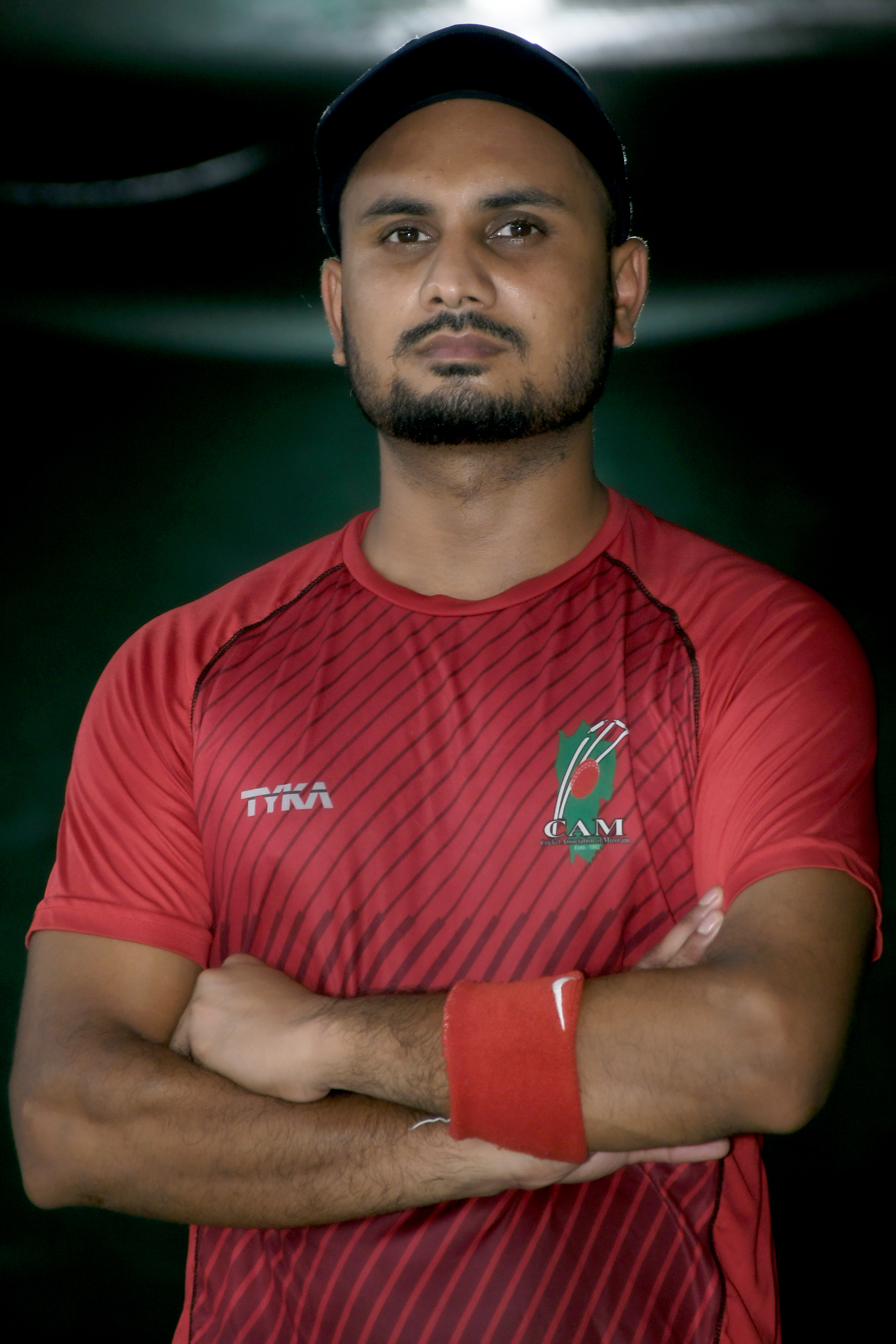

Personal information
- Born: 1 January 1996 (age 30)
- Batting: Right-handed
- Bowling: Right-arm medium
- Role: All-rounder
- Source: Cricinfo, 21 February 2019

Parvez Ahmed (born 1 January 1996) is an Indian cricketer. He made his Twenty20 debut for Mizoram in the 2018–19 Syed Mushtaq Ali Trophy on 21 February 2019. He made his List A debut on 24 September 2019, for Mizoram in the 2019–20 Vijay Hazare Trophy. He made his first-class debut on 9 December 2019, for Mizoram in the 2019–20 Ranji Trophy.
