= Indrajit Kumar =

Indian cricketer (born 1987)

Personal information
- Born: 21 October 1987 (age 39)
- Batting: Right-handed
- Bowling: Right-arm medium
- Role: Opening batsman

Domestic team information
- Years: Team
- 2018-present: Bihar
- Source: ESPNcricinfo, 20 November 2018

Indrajit Kumar (born 21 October 1987) is an Indian cricketer. He made his first-class debut for Bihar in the 2018–19 Ranji Trophy on 20 November 2018.
