= Lakhan Raja =

Indian cricketer (born 1994)

Personal information
- Born: 15 October 1994 (age 32); Saran, Bihar, India
- Batting: Left-handed
- Bowling: Right arm off break
- Source: ESPNcricinfo, 3 January 2020

Lakhan Raja (born 15 October 1994) is an Indian cricketer. He made his first-class debut on 3 January 2020, for Bihar in the 2019–20 Ranji Trophy. He made his List A debut on 24 February 2021, for Bihar in the 2020–21 Vijay Hazare Trophy.
