= Raman Bishnoi =

Indian cricketer (born 1997)

Personal information
- Born: 24 December 1997 (age 28); Mehrana, Punjab
- Batting: Right-handed
- Bowling: left arm fast
- Role: Batting all-rounder

Domestic team information
- Years: Team
- 2019–: Chandigarh

Career statistics
| Competition | FC |
|---|---|
| Matches | 9 |
| Runs scored | 549 |
| Batting average | 68.62 |
| 100s/50s | 3/2 |
| Top score | 139 |
| Balls bowled | 96 |
| Wickets | 1 |
| Bowling average | 40.00 |
| 5 wickets in innings | 0 |
| 10 wickets in match | 0 |
| Best bowling | 1/5 |
| Catches/stumpings | 8/– |
- Source: Cricinfo, 7 December 2020

Raman Bishnoi (born 24 December 1997) is an Indian cricketer. He made his first-class debut on 9 December 2019, for Chandigarh in the 2019–20 Ranji Trophy. He made his List A debut on 25 February 2021, for Chandigarh in the 2020–21 Vijay Hazare Trophy.
