= Shashi Shekhar =

Indian cricketer (born 1990)

Personal information
- Born: 15 January 1990 (age 36); Jehanabad, Bihar, India
- Batting: Right-handed
- Bowling: Right-arm medium

Domestic team information
- Years: Team
- 2019: Bihar
- Source: Cricinfo, 10 October 2019

Shashi Shekhar (born 15 January 1990) is an Indian cricketer. He made his List A debut on 10 October 2019, for Bihar in the 2019–20 Vijay Hazare Trophy. He made his Twenty20 debut on 11 November 2019, for Bihar in the 2019–20 Syed Mushtaq Ali Trophy. He made his first-class debut on 17 December 2019, for Bihar in the 2019–20 Ranji Trophy.
