= MD Rahmatullah =

Indian cricketer (born 1984)

Personal information
- Born: 10 December 1984 (age 41); Bhagalpur, Bihar, India
- Batting: Right-handed
- Role: Middle-order batsman

Domestic team information
- Years: Team
- 2018–: Bihar
- First-class debut: 1–2 November, 2018 Bihar v Uttarakhand
- Last First-class: 1–2 November, 2018 Bihar v Uttarakhand
- List A debut: 19 September, 2018 Bihar v Nagaland
- Last List A: 14 October, 2018 Bihar v Mumbai
- Source: ESPNcricinfo, 19 September 2018

MD Rahmatullah (born 10 December 1984) is an Indian cricketer. He made his List A debut for Bihar in the 2018–19 Vijay Hazare Trophy on 19 September 2018. He made his first-class debut for Bihar in the 2018–19 Ranji Trophy on 1 November 2018. He was the leading run-scorer for Bihar in the tournament, with 375 runs in eight matches. He made his Twenty20 debut for Bihar in the 2018–19 Syed Mushtaq Ali Trophy on 22 February 2019.
