= Arslan Khan (Indian cricketer) =

Indian cricketer (born 1999)

Personal information
- Born: 15 September 1999 (age 27); Shahjahanpur, Uttar Pradesh, India
- Batting: Left-handed
- Bowling: Right arm off break

Domestic team information
- Years: Team
- 2019–present: Chandigarh
- Source: ESPNcricinfo, 9 December 2019

Arslan Khan (born 15 September 1999) is an Indian cricketer. He made his first-class debut on 9 December 2019, for Chandigarh in the 2019–20 Ranji Trophy. In the first innings of the match, Khan scored the first century by a batsman for Chandigarh in first-class cricket. He also scored a double century on his first-class debut, with 233 not out. He made his Twenty20 debut on 17 January 2021, for Chandigarh in the 2020–21 Syed Mushtaq Ali Trophy. He made his List A debut on 21 February 2021, for Chandigarh in the 2020–21 Vijay Hazare Trophy.

== See also ==
- List of double centuries scored on first-class cricket debut
