= Sarfaraz Ashraf =

Indian cricketer (born 1989)

Personal information
- Full name: Mohammad Sarfaraz Ashraf
- Born: 2 November 1989 (age 37); Muzaffarpur, Bihar, India
- Batting: Left-handed
- Bowling: Slow left arm orthodox

Domestic team information
- Years: Team
- 2019–present: Bihar
- Source: Cricinfo, 10 October 2019

Sarfaraz Ashraf (born 2 November 1989) is an Indian cricketer. He made his List A debut on 10 October 2019, for Bihar in the 2019–20 Vijay Hazare Trophy. He made his first-class debut on 27 January 2020, for Bihar in the 2019–20 Ranji Trophy.
