= Jagjit Singh (cricketer) =

Indian cricketer (born 1997)

Personal information
- Full name: Jagjit Singh Sandhu
- Born: 28 January 1997 (age 29); Mohali, Punjab
- Bowling: Right arm Medium
- Role: Bowler

Domestic team information
- Years: Team
- 2020–present: Chandigarh

Career statistics
Competition	FC	LA	T20
Matches	24	22	21
Runs scored	317	97	63
Batting average	16.68	24.25	15.75
100s/50s	0/1	0/0	0/0
Top score	50	47	12*
Balls bowled	3,566	1,170	436
Wickets	82	26	30
Bowling average	24.13	24.25	19.00
5 wickets in innings	6	0	1
10 wickets in match	0	–	–
Best bowling	7/52	3/36	5/38
Catches/stumpings	2/–	5/–	1/–
- Source: ESPNcricinfo, 20 March 2025

Jagjit Singh (born 28 January 1997) is an Indian cricketer. He played for Punjab under-19 and currently plays for Chandigarh in domestic cricket as a bowler.

He made his first-class debut on 11 January 2020, for Chandigarh in the 2019–20 Ranji Trophy. He made his Twenty20 debut on 15 January 2021, for Chandigarh in the 2020–21 Syed Mushtaq Ali Trophy. He made his List A debut on 21 February 2021, for Chandigarh in the 2020–21 Vijay Hazare Trophy.
