= Nafees Siddique =

Indian cricketer (born 1996)

Personal information
- Born: 5 July 1996 (age 30); East Khasi Hills, Meghalaya
- Source: ESPNcricinfo, 12 February 2020

Nafees Siddique (born 5 July 1996) is an Indian cricketer. He made his first-class debut on 12 February 2020, for Meghalaya in the 2019–20 Ranji Trophy. He made his List A debut on 11 December 2021, for Meghalaya in the 2021–22 Vijay Hazare Trophy.
