= Nikhil Anand =

Indian cricketer (born 2001)

Personal information
- Born: 26 January 2001 (age 25); Sharif Nalanda, India
- Source: ESPNcricinfo, 4 February 2020

Nikhil Anand (born 26 January 2001) is an Indian cricketer. He made his first-class debut on 4 February 2020, for Bihar in the 2019–20 Ranji Trophy. He made his List A debut on 11 December 2021, for Bihar in the 2021–22 Vijay Hazare Trophy.
