= Ankit Kaushik =

Indian cricketer (born 1991)

Personal information
- Full name: Ankit Kapil Kaushik
- Born: 5 September 1991 (age 35); Chandigarh, India
- Batting: Right-handed
- Bowling: Legbreak googly

Career statistics
Competition	FC	LA	T20
Matches	4	24	16
Runs scored	270	567	130
Batting average	135.00	40.50	26.00
100s/50s	2/0	0/6	0/1
Top score	148*	83*	74*
Balls bowled	54	209	18
Wickets	0	6	2
Bowling average	–	42.00	19.50
5 wickets in innings	–	0	0
10 wickets in match	–	0	0
Best bowling	–	1/12	1/13
Catches/stumpings	2/–	6/0	5/0
- Source: ESPNcricinfo, 29 December 2019

Ankit Kaushik (born 5 September 1991) is an Indian cricketer. He made his Twenty20 debut for Himachal Pradesh in the 2012–13 Syed Mushtaq Ali Trophy on 5 April 2015. He made his List A debut for Himachal Pradesh in the 2016–17 Vijay Hazare Trophy on 25 February 2017. He made his first-class debut for Himachal Pradesh in the 2017–18 Ranji Trophy on 14 October 2017.

He moved to the Chandigarh cricket team for the 2019–20 Domestic season. In December 2019, in Chandigarh's match against Bihar in the 2019–20 Ranji Trophy, he scored his maiden first-class century.
