= Gurinder Singh (cricketer) =

Indian cricketer (born 1992)

Personal information
- Full name: Gurinder Rajpal Singh
- Born: 9 July 1992 (age 34); Chandigarh, India
- Batting: Right-handed
- Bowling: Slow left arm orthodox
- Role: Allrounder

Domestic team information
- Years: Team
- 2016/17: Tripura
- Source: ESPNcricinfo, 6 October 2016

Gurinder Singh (born 9 July 1992) is an Indian cricketer. He made his first-class debut for Tripura in the 2016–17 Ranji Trophy on 6 October 2016.

He was the joint-leading wicket-taker for Meghalaya in the 2018–19 Vijay Hazare Trophy, with fourteen dismissals in eight matches. He was again Meghalaya's highest wicket-taker in the 2018–19 Ranji Trophy, with 53 dismissals in eight matches.
