= Chandigarh cricket team =

Indian cricket team

Personnel
- Captain: Manan Vohra (FC & LA); Shivam Bhambri (T20)
- Coach: Rajeev Nayyar
- Owner: Union Territory Cricket Association

Team information
- Founded: 1981
- Home ground: Sector 16 Stadium
- Capacity: 30,000

History
- First-class debut: Arunachal Pradesh in 2019 at Sector 16 Stadium, Chandigarh
- Ranji Trophy wins: 0
- Vijay Hazare Trophy wins: 0
- Syed Mushtaq Ali Trophy wins: 0

Chandigarh cricket team represents the Union Territory of Chandigarh in Indian domestic cricket competitions. In August 2019, the Board of Control for Cricket in India (BCCI) named them as the last of ten expansion teams, the other nine having been introduced in 2018–19. Chandigarh made their senior debut in the 2019–20 season, playing in the Ranji Trophy, the Vijay Hazare Trophy, and the Syed Mushtaq Ali Trophy. Former Indian cricketer, V. R. V. Singh, was named as the first coach of the team.

Chandigarh made their debut in the Ranji Trophy in December 2019, in the Plate Division. In their first match of the season, Arslan Khan scored the first century by a batsman for Chandigarh in first-class cricket.

On 12 February 2020, their fixture against Manipur was the 60,000th first-class cricket match to be played.

== Home ground ==
Sector 16 Stadium, Chandigarh

== Current squad ==
- Players with international caps are listed in **bold**.

Name	Birth date	Batting style	Bowling style	Notes
Batsmen
Manan Vohra	18 July 1993 (age 33)	Right-handed	Right-arm medium	**First-class and List A Captain**
Arjun Azad	8 August 2001 (age 25)	Right-handed	Right-arm leg break	
Shivam Bhambri	30 September 1995 (age 31)	Right-handed	Right-arm leg break	**Twenty20 Captain**
Ankit Kaushik	5 September 1991 (age 35)	Right-handed	Right-arm leg break	
Sanyam Saini	2 July 1999 (age 27)	Left-handed	Right-arm off break	
Arslan Khan	15 September 1999 (age 27)	Left-handed		
Nejal Pajni	26 November 2000 (age 25)	Left-handed	Right-arm off break	
All-Rounders
Raj Bawa	12 November 2002 (age 24)	Left-handed	Right-arm medium	Plays for **Mumbai Indians** in IPL
Taranpreet Singh	11 June 1998 (age 28)	Right-handed	Slow left arm orthodox	
Raman Bishnoi	24 December 1997 (age 28)	Right-handed	Slow left arm orthodox	
Bhagmender Lather	18 June 1997 (age 29)	Left-handed	Slow left arm orthodox	
Wicket-keepers
Nikhil Thakur	15 March 1998 (age 28)	Right-handed		
Tushar Joshi	9 August 2000 (age 26)	Right-handed		
Arjit Pannu	24 April 1996 (age 30)	Right-handed		
Akshit Rana	8 February 2002 (age 24)	Right-handed		
Aarush Bhandari	20 July 2005 (age 21)	Right-handed		
Spin Bowlers
Nishunk Birla	22 October 2004 (age 22)	Left-handed	Slow left arm orthodox	
Vishu Kashyap	26 December 1997 (age 28)	Right-handed	Right-arm off break	
Chiragvir Dhindsa	30 January 2001 (age 25)	Right-handed	Right-arm off break	
Pace Bowlers
Jagjit Sandhu	28 January 1997 (age 29)	Right-handed	Right-arm medium	
Rohit Dhanda	19 November 1997 (age 28)	Right-handed	Right-arm medium	
**Sandeep Sharma**	18 May 1993 (age 33)	Right-handed	Right-arm medium	Plays for **Rajasthan Royals** in IPL
Hartejassvi Kapoor	16 September 1995 (age 31)	Left-handed	Right-arm medium	
Nikhil Sharma	9 February 1999 (age 27)	Right-handed	Right-arm medium	
Anirudh Kanwar	13 March 1994 (age 32)	Right-handed	Right-arm medium	

Updated as on 14 November 2026
