= 2018–19 Ranji Trophy Plate Group =

Cricket tournament

- The Ranji Trophy, awarded to the winners
- Dates: 1 November 2018 – 10 January 2019
- Administrator: BCCI
- Cricket format: First-class cricket
- Tournament format: Round-robin
- Host: India
- Participants: 9
- Matches: 36

The 2018–19 Ranji Trophy was the 85th season of the Ranji Trophy, the first-class cricket tournament that took place in India. It was contested by 37 teams, divided into four groups, with nine teams in the Plate Group. The group stage ran from 1 November 2018 to 10 January 2019. The top team from the Plate Group progressed to the quarter-finals of the competition. The teams in the Plate Group were allowed to have up to three professional players in their squads.

All of the matches in the first round of fixtures reached a result within three days, with Uttarakhand beating Bihar in two days. Nagaland beat Mizoram by an innings and 333 runs, the biggest winning margin for a team making its debut in the Ranji Trophy. Pondicherry made their debut in the second round of the tournament, against Meghalaya.

In fifth round match between Pondicherry and Arunachal Pradesh, Paras Dogra scored his eighth double century. He broke Ajay Sharma's record of the most double centuries by a batsman in the Ranji Trophy.

In the sixth round of fixtures, Milind Kumar of Sikkim became the first batsman to score 1,000 runs in this edition of the tournament. He did so in the match against Mizoram, in his ninth innings of the competition. In round seven of the tournament, Ashutosh Aman of Bihar became the first bowler to take 50 wickets in this years' Ranji Trophy tournament. He went on to finish the tournament with 68 wickets, breaking the previous record of 64 dismissals set by Bishan Singh Bedi in the 1974–75 tournament. Round eight saw Pankaj Singh of Pondicherry become the first seam bowler to take 400 wickets in the Ranji Trophy.

Uttarakhand won the Plate Group and advanced to the quarter-finals.

== Points table ==
| Team | Pld | W | L | D | T | NR | Pts | Quot |
|---|---|---|---|---|---|---|---|---|
| Uttarakhand | 8 | 6 | 0 | 2 | 0 | 0 | 44 | 2.435 |
| Bihar | 8 | 6 | 1 | 0 | 0 | 1 | 40 | 2.307 |
| Pondicherry | 8 | 4 | 0 | 3 | 0 | 1 | 33 | 1.859 |
| Meghalaya | 8 | 4 | 2 | 2 | 0 | 0 | 29 | 1.349 |
| Sikkim | 8 | 4 | 3 | 1 | 0 | 0 | 20 | 0.757 |
| Manipur | 8 | 3 | 5 | 0 | 0 | 0 | 18 | 0.845 |
| Nagaland | 8 | 2 | 4 | 2 | 0 | 0 | 18 | 1.039 |
| Arunachal Pradesh | 8 | 0 | 7 | 1 | 0 | 0 | 3 | 0.436 |
| Mizoram | 8 | 0 | 7 | 1 | 0 | 0 | 1 | 0.385 |

- Top team advanced to the knockout stage and gets promoted to Elite Group C for the next season.

== Fixtures ==
=== Round 1 ===
1–4 November 2018
Scorecard

| Bihar | v | Uttarakhand |
| 60 (22.1 overs); Vivek Mohan 13 (18); Deepak Dhapola 6/13 (8.1 overs) | | 227 (71.3 overs); Karn Kaushal 91 (135); Ashutosh Aman 4/34 (21 overs) |
| 169 (50.5 overs); Samar Quadri 36 (43); Sunny Kashyap 4/51 (15 overs) | | 4/0 (0.1 overs); Karn Kaushal 4* (1) |

Uttarakhand won by 10 wickets
Rajiv Gandhi International Cricket Stadium, Dehradun
Umpires: Pashchim Pathak and Puttarangaiah Jayapal
Player of the match: Deepak Dhapola (Uttarakhand)

- Uttarakhand won the toss and elected to field.
- Dhanraj Sharma, Kartik Joshi, Shivam Khurana, Deepak Dhapola Sunny Rana, Karn Kaushal (Uttarakhand), Vikash Ranjan, Kumar Rajnish, Vivek Mohan, MD Rahmatullah, Ashutosh Aman, Anunay Singh and Himanshu Hari (Bihar) all made their first-class debuts.
- Deepak Dhapola (Uttarakhand) took his maiden five-wicket haul in first-class cricket.

1–4 November 2018
Scorecard

| Mizoram | v | Nagaland |
| 106 (47.2 overs); Taruwar Kohli 49 (86); Abrar Kazi 4/16 (16 overs) | | 530/8d (117.2 overs); Abrar Kazi 200* (215); K Lalhmingmawia 3/90 (19.2 overs) |
| 91 (41.4 overs); Taruwar Kohli 48 (90); Abrar Kazi 5/13 (9 overs) |

Nagaland won by an innings and 333 runs
Nagaland Cricket Association Stadium, Dimapur
Umpires: Abhijit Deshmukh and Belur Ravi
Player of the match: Abrar Kazi (Nagaland)

- Mizoram won the toss and elected to bat.
- Nitesh Lohchab, Sedezhalie Rupero, Rachit Bhatia, Mughavi Wotsa, Tahmeed Rahman, Imliwati Lemtur (Nagaland), Michael Lalremkima, Akhil Rajput, C Lalrinsanga, K Vanlalruata, Lalhmangaiha, Sinan Khadir, Saidingliana Sailo, Lalhruai Ralte, G Lalbiakvela and K Lalhmingmawia (Mizoram) all made their first-class debuts.
- Abrar Kazi (Nagaland) scored his maiden double century in first-class cricket.

1–4 November 2018
Scorecard

| Sikkim | v | Manipur |
| 372 (111.2 overs); Milind Kumar 261 (331); Shelley Shaurya 4/39 (11.4 overs) | | 79 (28 overs); Kangabam Singh 30 (65); Ishwar Chaudhary 4/37 (10 overs) |
| | | 266 (80.2 overs) (f/o); Yashpal Singh 132* (194); Bipul Sharma 4/55 (21 overs) |

Sikkim won by an innings and 27 runs
Jadavpur University Campus 2nd Ground, Kolkata
Umpires: Krishnaraj Srinath and Navdeep Singh
Player of the match: Milind Kumar (Sikkim)

- Manipur won the toss and elected to field.
- Bishworjit Konthoujam, Bonny Chingangbam, Narisingh Yadav, Jayanta Sagatpam, Prafullomani Singh, Shelly Shaurya, Rex Rajkumar, Kangabam Singh, Lakhan Rawat, Sultan Karim (Manipur), Chitiz Tamang, Faizan Khan, Nilesh Lamichaney, Palzor Tamang, Ashish Thapa, Lee Yong Lepcha, Padam Limboo and Amos Rai (Sikkim) all made their first-class debuts.

1–4 November 2018
Scorecard

| Arunachal Pradesh | v | Meghalaya |
| 166 (64.3 overs); Samarth Seth 50 (81); Gurinder Singh 5/50 (24.3 overs) | | 141 (40 overs); Jason Lamare 70 (119); Sandeep Kumar Thakur 3/19 (4 overs) |
| 131 (55.1 overs); Kshitiz Sharma 41 (70); Gurinder Singh 4/21 (19.1 overs) | | 157/3 (32 overs); Puneet Bisht 66* (70); Licha Tehi 2/30 (12 overs) |

Meghalaya won by 7 wickets
Meghalaya Cricket Association Cricket Ground, Shillong
Umpires: Sivasubramaniyan Shankar and Sai Darshan Kumar
Player of the match: Jason Lamare (Meghalaya)

- Meghalaya won the toss and elected to field.
- Chengkam Sangma, Dippu Sangma, Aditya Singhania, Babloo Passah, Raj Biswa, Lakhan Singh, Abhay Negi (Meghalaya), Samarth Seth, Techi Doria, Neelam Obi, Kshitiz Sharma, Akhilesh Sahani, Kamsha Yangfo, Akash Singh, Licha Tehi, Subhash Sharma, Sandeep Kumar Thakur and Md Shoyeb (Arunachal Pradesh) all made their first-class debuts.

=== Round 2 ===
12–15 November 2018
Scorecard

| Pondicherry | v | Meghalaya |
| 389 (127.3 overs); Damodaren Rohit 138 (321); Gurinder Singh 4/106 (42.3 overs) | | 326 (112 overs); Yogesh Nagar 141* (270); Pankaj Singh 6/39 (25 overs) |
| 129/7 (47.1 overs); Vikneshwaran Marimuthu 47 (91); Gurinder Singh 5/44 (16.1 overs) |

Match drawn
Cricket Association Pondicherry Siechem Ground, Puducherry
Umpires: Jayaraman Madanagopal and Puttarangaiah Jayapal

- Pondicherry won the toss and elected to bat.
- Angadu Narayanan, Vikneshwaran Marimuthu, Damodaren Rohit, Akshay Jain, Vengadeshwaran, Pawan Kumar, Ranjit Baskaran (Pondicherry), Sylvester Mylliempdah and Amiangshu Sen (Meghalaya) all made their first-class debuts.
- Abhishek Nayar (Pondicherry) played in his 100th first-class match.
- Paras Dogra became the first batsman for Pondicherry to score a century in the Ranji Trophy.

12–15 November 2018
Scorecard

| Arunachal Pradesh | v | Mizoram |
| 220 (66.2 overs); Akhilesh Sahani 65 (118); Taruwar Kohli 3/62 (19 overs) | | 142 (43.2 overs); Akhil Rajput 57 (73); Techi Doria 4/26 (6 overs) |
| 331 (96 overs); Neelam Obi 80 (172); Sinan Khadir 3/81 (21 overs) | | 244/2 (59 overs); Akhil Rajput 124 (134); Techi Doria 1/48 (10 overs) |

Match drawn
District Sports Association Ground, Jorhat
Umpires: Abhijit Deshmukh and Subrat Das
Player of the match: Techi Doria (Arunachal Pradesh)

- Arunachal Pradesh won the toss and elected to bat.
- No play was possible on day 4 due to rain.
- Lalhruaizela (Mizoram), Techi Tahin and Hayat Ansari (Arunachal Pradesh) all made their first-class debuts.

12–15 November 2018
Scorecard

| Nagaland | v | Sikkim |
| 179 (52.5 overs); Rongsen Jonathan 86 (112); Ishwar Chaudhary 4/65 (16 overs) | | 374 (82.5 overs); Milind Kumar 224 (215); Pawan Suyal 7/108 (25 overs) |
| 273 (95 overs); KB Pawan 134 (208); Ishwar Chaudhary 5/70 (24 overs) | | 81/1 (25.4 overs); Nilesh Lamichaney 33* (66); Pawan Suyal 1/33 (8.4 overs) |

Sikkim won by 9 wickets
Nagaland Cricket Stadium, Dimapur
Umpires: Sanjeev Dua and Kamlesh Sharma
Player of the match: Milind Kumar (Sikkim)

- Sikkim won the toss and elected to field.
- Milind Kumar (Sikkim) scored his second-successive double century in first-class cricket.

12–15 November 2018
Scorecard

| Manipur | v | Uttarakhand |
| 137 (42 overs); Yashpal Singh 38 (84); Deepak Dhapola 7/50 (16 overs) | | 228 (73.1 overs); Rajat Bhatia 61 (63); Kishan Thokchom 4/50 (17 overs) |
| 185 (74.4 overs); Lakhan Rawat 82 (202); Deepak Dhapola 5/46 (21.4 overs) | | 99/2 (17.5 overs); Vineet Saxena 32* (50); Kishan Thokchom 1/10 (6 overs) |

Uttarakhand won by 8 wickets
Rajiv Gandhi International Cricket Stadium, Dehradun
Umpires: Sai Darshan Kumar and Yeshwant Barde
Player of the match: Deepak Dhapola (Uttarakhand)

- Uttarakhand won the toss and elected to field.
- Vaibhav Bhatt, Mayank Mishra (Uttarakhand), Konjengbam Sashikant Singh and Kishan Thokchom (Manipur) all made their first-class debut.

=== Round 3 ===
20–23 November 2018
Scorecard

| Uttarakhand | v | Sikkim |
| 582/9d (163 overs); Saurabh Rawat 220 (381); Ishwar Chaudhary 4/105 (27 overs) | | 264 (96 overs); Milind Kumar 133 (164); Dhanraj Sharma 3/36 (14 overs) |
| | | 140 (48.5 overs) (f/o); Milind Kumar 61 (68); Deepak Dhapola 4/44 (12.5 overs) |

Uttarakhand won by an innings and 178 runs
KIIT Stadium, Bhubaneswar
Umpires: Mukund Mandale and Sanjay Kumar Singh
Player of the match: Saurabh Rawat (Uttarakhand)

- Sikkim won the toss and elected to field.
- Saurabh Rawat (Uttarakhand) scored his maiden double century in first-class cricket.

20–23 November 2018
Scorecard

| Pondicherry | v | Bihar |

No result
Cricket Association Pondicherry Siechem Ground, Puducherry
Umpires: Sai Darshan Kumar and Rajesh Timaney

- Bihar won the toss and elected to field.
- No play was possible due to rain.
- Sashi Kumar, Prashanth Varma (Pondicherry), Harsh Singh, Indrajit Kumar, Vishal Das and Vivek Kumar (Bihar) all made their first-class debuts.

20–23 November 2018
Scorecard

| Meghalaya | v | Nagaland |
| 389 (110.2 overs); Yogesh Nagar 166 (197); Pawan Suyal 5/96 (30 overs) | | 106 (46.3 overs); KB Pawan 21 (36); Gurinder Singh 4/37 (16.3 overs) |
| 91/4 (21.4 overs); Puneet Bisht 34* (63); Pawan Suyal 2/18 (9 overs) | | 371 (114.2 overs) (f/o); Abrar Kazi 164 (208); Aditya Singhania 5/52 (29.2 overs) |

Meghalaya won by 6 wickets
Meghalaya Cricket Association Cricket Ground, Shillong
Umpires: Nand Kishore and Subrat Das
Player of the match: Yogesh Nagar (Meghalaya)

- Nagaland won the toss and elected to field.
- Tarique Siddique (Meghalaya), Jalal Uddin and Paras Sehrawat (Nagaland) all made their first-class debuts.

20–23 November 2018
Scorecard

| Mizoram | v | Manipur |
| 219 (69.1 overs); Taruwar Kohli 100 (181); Bishworjit Konthoujam 3/50 (13 overs) | | 319 (87 overs); Yashpal Singh 156* (244); K Lalhmingmawia 3/88 (24 overs) |
| 116 (37 overs); Lalnunkima Varte 28 (57); Kishan Thokchom 4/20 (13 overs) | | 19/2 (7.5 overs); Bonny Chingangbam 9* (17); K Lalhmingmawia 1/2 (3 overs) |

Manipur won by 8 wickets
District Sports Association Ground, Jorhat
Umpires: Amit Bansal and Somnath Jha
Player of the match: Yashpal Singh (Manipur)

- Manipur won the toss and elected to field.
- Lalnunkima Varte, S Zorinliana (Mizoram), Homendro Kabrambam, Kennedy and Nungleppam William Singh (Manipur) all made their first-class debuts.

=== Round 4 ===
28 November–1 December 2018
Scorecard

| Bihar | v | Sikkim |
| 288 (90.5 overs); Ashutosh Aman 89 (155); Ishwar Chaudhary 6/78 (20.5 overs) | | 81 (39.4 overs); Amos Rai 19 (46); Ashutosh Aman 5/19 (12.4 overs) |
| 296/7d (81 overs); MD Rahmatullah 66 (116); Milind Kumar 4/63 (25 overs) | | 108 (43.1 overs); Bipul Sharma 32 (76); Ashutosh Aman 5/22 (13.1 overs) |

Bihar won by 395 runs
Moin-ul-Haq Stadium, Patna
Umpires: Saiyed Khalid and Kamlesh Sharma
Player of the match: Ashutosh Aman (Bihar)

- Bihar won the toss and elected to bat.
- Utkarsh Bhaskar (Bihar), Bijay Subba, Bibek Diyali, Jahan Uddin and Pritam Nirala (Sikkim) all made their first-class debuts.

28 November–1 December 2018
Scorecard

| Manipur | v | Meghalaya |
| 211 (64.1 overs); Prafullomani Singh 64 (108); Aditya Singhania 4/42 (14 overs) | | 326 (87.4 overs); Puneet Bisht 92 (88); Homendro Kabrambam 3/27 (12.4 overs) |
| 172 (43 overs); Yashpal Singh 103* (133); Gurinder Singh 5/46 (16 overs) | | 58/1 (11.1 overs); Raj Biswa 44* (35); Kishan Thokchom 1/19 (5 overs) |

Meghalaya won by 9 wickets
Jadavpur University Campus 2nd Ground, Kolkata
Umpires: Puttarangaiah Jayapal and Subrat Das
Player of the match: Gurinder Singh (Meghalaya)

- Meghalaya won the toss and elected to field.
- Bimol Singh, Syed Mujibur Rahaman and Santosh Singh (Manipur) all made their first-class debuts.

28 November–1 December 2018
Scorecard

| Arunachal Pradesh | v | Uttarakhand |
| 105 (46 overs); Kshitiz Sharma 57 (122); Mayank Mishra 4/23 (14 overs) | | 470/4d (108.4 overs); Kartik Joshi 208* (308); Subhash Sharma 1/48 (15 overs) |
| 292 (112.3 overs); Kshitiz Sharma 118 (256); Mayank Mishra 4/57 (28.3 overs) |

Uttarakhand won by an innings and 73 runs
DN Singha Stadium, Goalpara
Umpires: Jayaraman Madanagopal and Chirra Ravikanthreddy
Player of the match: Kartik Joshi (Uttarakhand)

- Uttarakhand won the toss and elected to field.
- Myendung Singpho, Techi Neri (Arunachal Pradesh), Piyush Joshi and Girish Rauturi (Uttarakhand) all made their first-class debuts.
- Kartik Joshi (Uttarakhand) scored his maiden double century in first-class cricket.

28 November–1 December 2018
Scorecard

| Mizoram | v | Pondicherry |
| 92 (54.4 overs); Michael Lalremkima 25 (106); Pankaj Singh 7/21 (16.4 overs) | | 375/8d (89.1 overs); Fabid Ahmed 103* (153); Sinan Khadir 5/97 (33 overs) |
| 45 (29.3 overs); Michael Lalremkima 20 (54); Fabid Ahmed 4/8 (12 overs) |

Pondicherry won by an innings and 238 runs
Cricket Association Pondicherry Siechem Ground, Puducherry
Umpires: Sivasubramaniyan Shankar and Sai Darshan Kumar

- Mizoram won the toss and elected to bat.
- No play was possible on day 2 due to rain.
- Saju Chothan (Pondicherry) made his first-class debut.
- Pankaj Singh (Pondicherry) set a new record for the most five-wicket hauls against different teams in the Ranji Trophy with 17. Overall, it was his 27th five-wicket haul.

=== Round 5 ===
6–9 December 2018
Scorecard

| Nagaland | v | Manipur |
| 126 (37.3 overs); Paras Sehrawat 27* (56); Kangabam Singh 3/20 (7.3 overs) | | 336 (91.4 overs); Mayank Raghav 228 (269); Tahmeed Rahman 5/108 (27 overs) |
| 334 (98.1 overs); KB Pawan 131 (203); Yashpal Singh 5/46 (23.1 overs) | | 128/3 (36.4 overs); Lakhan Rawat 55 (116); Abrar Kazi 1/21 (9 overs) |

Manipur won by 7 wickets
Nagaland Cricket Association Stadium, Dimapur
Umpires: Amit Bansal and Rajesh Timaney
Player of the match: Mayank Raghav (Manipur)

- Manipur won the toss and elected to field.
- Mayank Raghav and Samson Singh (Manipur) both made their first-class debuts.
- Mayank Raghav (Manipur) scored his maiden century in first-class cricket and went on to convert it into his maiden double century.
- Tahmeed Rahman (Nagaland) took a hat-trick.

6–9 December 2018
Scorecard

| Meghalaya | v | Uttarakhand |
| 311 (95.5 overs); Puneet Bisht 154 (226); Deepak Dhapola 6/52 (28.5 overs) | | 491/4d (163 overs); Rajat Bhatia 212* (340); Dippu Sangma 2/50 (19 overs) |
| 230 (66.2 overs); Gurinder Singh 104 (149); Deepak Dhapola 5/59 (23.2 overs) | | 53/2 (6.1 overs); Vaibhav Singh Panwar 32* (12); Chengkam Sangma 1/13 (2 overs) |

Uttarakhand won by 8 wickets
Rajiv Gandhi International Cricket Stadium, Dehradun
Umpires: Akshay Totre and Madanagopal Kuppuraj
Player of the match: Deepak Dhapola (Uttarakhand)

- Uttarakhand won the toss and elected to field.
- Swarajeet Das and Wanlambok Nongkhlaw (Meghalaya) both made their first-class debuts.
- Deepak Dhapola (Uttarakhand) took a hat-trick.

6–9 December 2018
Scorecard

| Pondicherry | v | Sikkim |
| 647/8d (157 overs); Paras Dogra 253 (244); Dinesh Rai 2/70 (20 overs) | | 247 (72.2 overs); Milind Kumar 96 (102); Pankaj Singh 3/21 (14.2 overs) |
| | | 241 (76 overs) (f/o); Milind Kumar 77* (102); Abhishek Nayar 5/76 (20 overs) |

Pondicherry won by an innings and 159 runs
KIIT Stadium, Bhubaneswar
Umpires: Mukund Mandale and Sanjay Kumar Singh
Player of the match: Paras Dogra (Pondicherry)

- Sikkim won the toss and elected to field.
- Dinesh Rai, Karma Bhutia, Mandup Bhutia (Sikkim) and Abhijeet Saranath (Pondicherry) all made their first-class debuts.
- Paras Dogra (Pondicherry) scored his eighth double century, the most by a batsman in the Ranji Trophy.

6–9 December 2018
Scorecard

| Arunachal Pradesh | v | Bihar |
| 84 (39.5 overs); Techi Doria 33 (109); Ashutosh Aman 4/26 (10.5 overs) | | 536/5d (112 overs); Indrajit Kumar 222 (266); Myendung Singpho 2/90 (24 overs) |
| 135 (47.4 overs); Samarth Seth 58 (88); Ashutosh Aman 7/14 (13.4 overs) |

Bihar won by an innings and 317 runs
Moin-ul-Haq Stadium, Patna
Umpires: Rajeev Godara and Somnath Jha
Player of the match: Indrajit Kumar (Bihar)

- Bihar won the toss and elected to field.
- Rehan Khan (Bihar), Indiya Toku and Prateek Kataria (Arunachal Pradesh) all made their first-class debuts.

=== Round 6 ===
14–17 December 2018
Scorecard

| Sikkim | v | Mizoram |
| 332 (89.5 overs); Milind Kumar 139 (136); Sinan Khadir 3/74 (21 overs) | | 161 (57 overs); Taruwar Kohli 74 (150); Ishwar Chaudhary 5/57 (18 overs) |
| 169 (49.1 overs); Bipul Sharma 65 (72); Taruwar Kohli 5/39 (15 overs) | | 236 (74.5 overs); Taruwar Kohli 156 (249); Ishwar Chaudhary 6/111 (23 overs) |

Sikkim won by 105 runs
District Sports Association Ground, Jorhat
Umpires: Ranjeev Sharma and Saiyed Khalid
Player of the match: Taruwar Kohli (Mizoram)

- Mizoram won the toss and elected to field.
- Bobby Zothansanga and Hmar Zothanchhunga (Mizoram) both made their first-class debuts.
- Milind Kumar (Sikkim) scored his 1,000th run in this years' Ranji Trophy.

14–17 December 2018
Scorecard

| Pondicherry | v | Arunachal Pradesh |
| 136 (35.5 overs); Fabid Ahmed 41* (59); Deendyal Upadhyay 4/36 (10.5 overs) | | 82 (35.5 overs); Nipun Malhotra 19 (30); Fabid Ahmed 6/29 (16.5 overs) |
| 351 (76.2 overs); Paras Dogra 139* (143); Deendyal Upadhyay 4/63 (15.2 overs) | | 71 (22.2 overs); Tana Davit 14 (25); Pankaj Singh 5/25 (9.2 overs) |

Pondicherry won by 334 runs
DN Singha Stadium, Goalpara
Umpires: Chirra Ravikanthreddy and Sadashiv Iyer
Player of the match: Fabid Ahmed (Pondicherry)

- Arunachal Pradesh won the toss and elected to field.
- Tana Davit, Deendyal Upadhyay, Nipun Malhotra, Song Tacho (Arunachal Pradesh) and Santhosh Kumaran (Pondicherry) all made their first-class debuts.

14–17 December 2018
Scorecard

| Meghalaya | v | Bihar |
| 125 (52.5 overs); Raj Biswa 56 (105); Ashutosh Aman 8/51 (22.5 overs) | | 242 (81.3 overs); Babul Kumar 43 (83); Lakhan Singh 3/30 (10 overs) |
| 46 (26.5 overs); Gurinder Singh 10 (16); Ashutosh Aman 6/17 (13 overs) |

Bihar won by an innings and 71 runs
Meghalaya Cricket Association Cricket Ground, Shillong
Umpires: Seetharam Ratnakar and Anil Chaudhary
Player of the match: Ashutosh Aman (Bihar)

- Meghalaya won the toss and elected to bat.

14–17 December 2018
Scorecard

| Nagaland | v | Uttarakhand |
| 207 (59.4 overs); Rongsen Jonathan 69 (88); Deepak Dhapola 5/49 (16.4 overs) | | 557 (151.5 overs); Vineet Saxena 185 (384); Abrar Kazi 3/124 (43.5 overs) |
| 467/7 (116 overs); Abrar Kazi 157* (228); Mayank Mishra 3/82 (32 overs) |

Match drawn
Abhimanyu Cricket Academy, Dehradun
Umpires: Ravi Shankar and Anand Ovalekar
Player of the match: Abrar Kazi (Nagaland)

- Uttarakhand won the toss and elected to field.

=== Round 7 ===
20–23 December 2018
Scorecard

| Mizoram | v | Meghalaya |
| 86 (28.1 overs); Lalhruai Ralte 40 (64); Gurinder Singh 5/15 (8.1 overs) | | 510 (95.4 overs); Yogesh Nagar 144 (141); Sinan Khadir 4/151 (32.4 overs) |
| 100 (38.3 overs); Sinan Khadir 30 (70); Gurinder Singh 6/41 (19 overs) |

Meghalaya won by an innings and 324 runs
Meghalaya Cricket Association Cricket Ground, Shillong
Umpires: Amit Bansal and GS Ananth Ramakrishnan
Player of the match: Gurinder Singh (Meghalaya)

- Meghalaya won the toss and elected to field.
- Laxman Chettri, Bijon Dey (Meghalaya), Khawlhring Lalremruata and Lalrempuia (Mizoram) all made their first-class debuts.

22–25 December 2018
Scorecard

| Bihar | v | Nagaland |
| 150 (46.1 overs); Indrajit Kumar 25 (55); Rachit Bhatia 6/44 (16.1 overs) | | 209 (75.4 overs); Rongsen Jonathan 53 (123); Ashutosh Aman 7/47 (31.4 overs) |
| 504/8d (115 overs); Mangal Mahrour 177 (244); Abrar Kazi 5/97 (46 overs) | | 173 (45.5 overs); Rongsen Jonathan 100 (113); Ashutosh Aman 5/49 (15.5 overs) |

Bihar won by 273 runs
Moin-ul-Haq Stadium, Patna
Umpires: Sai Darshan Kumar and Subrat Das
Player of the match: Ashutosh Aman (Bihar)

- Nagaland won the toss and elected to field.
- Mangal Mahrour (Bihar), Inakato Zhimomi and Arun Chauhan (Nagaland) all made their first-class debuts.
- Ashutosh Aman (Bihar) became the first bowler to take 50 wickets in this years' Ranji Trophy tournament.

22–25 December 2018
Scorecard

| Manipur | v | Arunachal Pradesh |
| 85 (26 overs); Kishan Thokchom 19 (21); Deendyal Upadhyay 5/38 (12 overs) | | 66 (23.3 overs); Kshitiz Sharma 11 (25); Kishan Thokchom 5/16 (10.3 overs) |
| 253 (56 overs); Hrithik Kanojia 91 (119); Techi Doria 3/71 (13 overs) | | 160 (37.3 overs); Deendyal Upadhyay 52 (50); Kangabam Singh 3/33 (7 overs) |

Manipur won by 112 runs
Videocon Academy Ground, Kolkata
Umpires: Abhijit Bengeri and Rajesh Timaney
Player of the match: Kishan Thokchom (Manipur)

- Arunachal Pradesh won the toss and elected to bat.
- Hrithik Kanojia, Bobin Singh (Manipur), Utsav Pankaj Madan and Ketan Garg (Arunachal Pradesh) all made their first-class debuts.

22–25 December 2018
Scorecard

| Pondicherry | v | Uttarakhand |
| 23/3 (15 overs); Karthik Sukumaran 10* (15); Dhanraj Sharma 2/7 (5 overs) |

Match drawn
Cricket Association Pondicherry Siechem Ground, Puducherry
Umpires: Yeshwant Barde and Madanagopal Kuppuraj

- Pondicherry won the toss and elected to bat.
- No play was possible on days 1 and 2 due to rain.
- Only 8.2 overs were bowled on day 3, after the umpires declared that the pitch was unfit.
- On day 4, the match was restarted, with another toss taking place. However, only 15 overs of play was possible, before the match was called off.
- Madhavan Manohar, Saiju Titus and Karthik Sukumaran (Pondicherry) all made their first-class debuts.

=== Round 8 ===
30 December 2018 – 2 January 2019
Scorecard

| Bihar | v | Mizoram |
| 440/9d (102 overs); Ashutosh Aman 111 (168); Lalhruai Ralte 5/122 (29 overs) | | 77 (35.5 overs); Akhil Rajput 49 (107); Samar Quadri 6/19 (7.5 overs) |
| | | 147 (62.2 overs) (f/o); Taruwar Kohli 76 (151); Ashutosh Aman 5/28 (23 overs) |

Bihar won by an innings and 216 runs
District Sports Association Ground, Jorhat
Umpires: Nikhil Patwardhan and Belur Ravi
Player of the match: Ashutosh Aman (Bihar)

- Mizoram won the toss and elected to field.
- Darremsanga (Mizoram), Anshuman Gautam and Abhijeet Saket (Bihar) all made their first-class debuts.

30 December 2018 – 2 January 2019
Scorecard

| Arunachal Pradesh | v | Nagaland |
| 135 (54.3 overs); Song Tacho 31 (96); Pawan Suyal 4/28 (13 overs) | | 377/9d (77.1 overs); Rongsen Jonathan 131 (107); Deendyal Upadhyay 4/84 (25 overs) |
| 122 (53.5 overs); Techi Doria 33 (49); Abrar Kazi 6/22 (19 overs) |

Nagaland won by an innings and 120 runs
Nagaland Cricket Stadium, Dimapur
Umpires: Sanjay Kumar Singh and Somnath Jha
Player of the match: Rongsen Jonathan (Nagaland)

- Nagaland won the toss and elected to field.
- Toni Chishi (Nagaland) and Robin Toko (Arunachal Pradesh) both made their first-class debuts.

30 December 2018 – 2 January 2019
Scorecard

| Manipur | v | Pondicherry |
| 132 (39.2 overs); Yashpal Singh 50 (85); Pankaj Singh 4/32 (13.2 overs) | | 238 (78.2 overs); Karthik Sukumaran 55 (91); Kishan Thokchom 4/65 (19.2 overs) |
| 118 (31.5 overs); Yashpal Singh 52 (83); Pankaj Singh 4/20 (12.5 overs) | | 13/0 (1.1 overs); Paras Dogra 8* (3) |

Pondicherry won by 10 wickets
Rural Development Trust Stadium, Anantapur
Umpires: Mukund Mandale and Pashchim Pathak
Player of the match: Pankaj Singh (Pondicherry)

- Pondicherry won the toss and elected to field.
- Akshaykumar Singh, Ahmed Shah and Maheshkumar Singh (Manipur) all made their first-class debuts.
- Pankaj Singh (Pondicherry) became the first seam bowler to take 400 wickets in the Ranji Trophy.

30 December 2018 – 2 January 2019
Scorecard

| Sikkim | v | Meghalaya |
| 219 (63 overs); Milind Kumar 117 (219); Gurinder Singh 3/71 (22 overs) | | 826/7d (171.4 overs); Puneet Bisht 343 (332); Lee Yong Lepcha 2/157 (26 overs) |
| 304/4 (108 overs); Milind Kumar 127* (121); Gurinder Singh 3/84 (35 overs) |

Match drawn
KIIT Stadium, Bhubaneswar
Umpires: Akshay Totre and Rajeev Godara
Player of the match: Puneet Bisht (Meghalaya)

- Meghalaya won the toss and elected to field.
- Tshering Bhutia and Rinzing Bhutia (Sikkim) both made their first-class debuts.
- Puneet Bisht (Meghalaya) scored his maiden triple century in first-class cricket.
- Meghalaya made the joint-fifth highest total in the Ranji Trophy.

=== Round 9 ===
7–10 January 2019
Scorecard

| Nagaland | v | Pondicherry |
| 467 (106.3 overs); Hokaito Zhimomi 177 (231); Raiphi Gomez 3/59 (20.3 overs) | | 286 (98.2 overs); Paras Dogra 144 (239); Abrar Kazi 4/62 (28 overs) |
| 222/6d (61 overs); Hokaito Zhimomi 63* (137); Pankaj Singh 3/61 (15 overs) | | 208/3 (67 overs); Vikneshwaran Marimuthu 64 (126); Imliwati Lemtur 2/43 (17 overs) |

Match drawn
Nagaland Cricket Stadium, Sovima
Umpires: Sanjay Kumar Singh and Subrat Das
Player of the match: Hokaito Zhimomi (Nagaland)

- Nagaland won the toss and elected to bat.

7–10 January 2019
Scorecard

| Arunachal Pradesh | v | Sikkim |
| 169 (49.1 overs); Kshitiz Sharma 59 (71); Milind Kumar 5/42 (14.1 overs) | | 262 (95.3 overs); Milind Kumar 51 (44); Deendyal Upadhyay 4/96 (29.3 overs) |
| 109 (45.3 overs); Techi Neri 23* (46); Ishwar Chaudhary 7/51 (16.3 overs) | | 19/0 (1.3 overs); Milind Kumar 19* (8) |

Sikkim won by 10 wickets
DN Singha Stadium, Goalpara
Umpires: Mukund Mandale and Rajesh Timaney
Player of the match: Ishwar Chaudhary (Sikkim)

- Sikkim won the toss and elected to field.
- Amit Kumar (Arunachal Pradesh) and Tashi Bhalla (Sikkim) both made their first-class debuts.

7–10 January 2019
Scorecard

| Uttarakhand | v | Mizoram |
| 377 (83.5 overs); Saurabh Rawat 102 (149); Akhil Rajput 2/21 (4.5 overs) | | 198 (75.2 overs); Taruwar Kohli 96* (199); Dhanraj Sharma 3/49 (16 overs) |
| | | 123 (59 overs) (f/o); Taruwar Kohli 68* (136); Rajat Bhatia 4/17 (9 overs) |

Uttarakhand won by an innings and 56 runs
Rajiv Gandhi International Cricket Stadium, Dehradun
Umpires: Abhijit Bengeri and Somnath Jha
Player of the match: Taruwar Kohli (Uttarakhand)

- Mizoram won the toss and elected to field.
- Andrew Vanlalhruaia and Abhay Joshi (Mizoram) both made their first-class debuts.

7–10 January 2019
Scorecard

| Manipur | v | Bihar |
| 156 (32 overs); Mayank Raghav 79 (54); Samar Quadri 5/49 (12 overs) | | 257 (63.1 overs); Vivek Kumar 40 (39); Bishworjit Konthoujam 5/74 (19.1 overs) |
| 238 (70.4 overs); Yashpal Singh 105 (166); Ashutosh Aman 7/71 (29.4 overs) | | 140/7 (25.1 overs); Mangal Mahrour 53 (51); Bishworjit Konthoujam 3/33 (9.1 overs) |

Bihar won by 3 wickets
Moin-ul-Haq Stadium, Patna
Umpires: Akshay Totre and Amit Bansal
Player of the match: Ashutosh Aman (Bihar)

- Bihar won the toss and elected to field.
- Kumar Aditya, Kundan Gupta (Bihar), Rajesh Singh, Heman Luwang and Akoijam Tenyson Singh (Manipur) all made their first-class debuts.
- Ashutosh Aman (Bihar) took a hat-trick.
