= List of Mizoram cricketers =

This is a list of cricketers who have played first-class, List A or Twenty20 cricket for the Mizoram cricket team, representing the Indian state of Mizoram. The side was established in July 2018 and played its first matches during the 2018–19 Indian cricket season.

The details given are the players name. Note that some players will have played senior matches for other sides, including the India national cricket team.

As of 13 July 2023

== A ==
- Uday Abhay

== D ==
- Pratik Desai

== G ==
- Gaurav Singh
- Shreevats Goswami

== I ==
- Iqbal Abdulla

== J ==
- Abhay Joshi

== K ==
- Uday Kaul
- Abrar Kazi
- Sinan Khadir
- Taruwar Kohli

== L ==
- G Lalbiakvela
- Lalchhuanliana
- Golden Lalchhuanmawia
- Lalhmangaiha
- K Lalhmingmawia
- Reuben Lalhruaizela
- Lalhruaizela
- Lalnuntluanga
- Michael Lalremkima
- Lalrempuia
- Khawlhring Lalremruata
- Jonathan Lalrinchhana
- C Lalrinsanga
- Lalruatdika
- Ricky Lalthlamuana
- Sumit Lamba

== P ==
- Parvez Ahmed
- KB Pawan

== R ==
- Akhil Rajput
- Lalhruai Ralte
- Rosiamliana Ralte
- Moses Ramhlunmawia
- Darremsanga Renthlei
- Henry Renthlei
- Lalfakzuala Renthlei

== S ==
- Saidingliana Sailo

== V ==
- Andrew Vanlalhruaia
- Khawlhring Vanlalruata
- Lalnunkima Varte
- Vikash Kumar

== Z ==
- Sailung Zorinliana
- Hmar Zothanchhunga
- Bobby Zothansanga
