= 2021–22 Syed Mushtaq Ali Trophy Plate Group =

Cricket tournament

- Dates: 4 – 22 November 2021
- Administrator(s): BCCI
- Cricket format: Twenty20 cricket
- Tournament format(s): Round-robin
- Participants: 8

The 2021–22 Syed Mushtaq Ali Trophy was the fourteenth season of the Syed Mushtaq Ali Trophy, a Twenty20 cricket tournament played in India. It was contested by 38 teams, divided into six groups, with eight teams in Plate Group. The tournament was announced by BCCI on 3 July 2021.

On 8 November 2021, in the match between Vidarbha and Manipur, Akshay Karnewar of Vidarbha became the first bowler to bowl four overs in a Twenty20 cricket match without conceding a run. The following day, in Vidarbha's match against Sikkim, Karnewar took a hat-trick. Vidarbha topped the group with five wins out of five to qualify for the preliminary quarter-finals.

== Points table ==
Pos	Team	Pld	W	L	NR	Pts	NRR
1	Vidarbha	5	5	0	0	20	4.967
2	Tripura	5	4	1	0	16	2.151
3	Meghalaya	5	4	1	0	16	1.131
4	Nagaland	5	3	2	0	12	0.396
5	Sikkim	5	2	3	0	8	−1.427
6	Mizoram	5	1	4	0	4	−0.959
7	Manipur	5	1	4	0	4	−2.708
8	Arunachal Pradesh	5	0	5	0	0	−3.322

Source: ESPN Cricinfo

Advanced to Preliminary quarter-final

== Fixtures ==
=== Round 1 ===
4 November 2021
Scorecard

Vidarbha; 163/6 (20 overs)	v	Arunachal Pradesh; 69/9 (20 overs)
Apoorv Wankhade 39* (28); Rajesh Bishnoi 3/21 (4 overs)		Rajesh Bishnoi 19 (31); Darshan Nalkande 5/9 (4 overs)

Vidarbha won by 94 runs
Devineni Venkata Ramana Praneetha Ground, Vijayawada
Umpires: Abhijeet Bengeri and GS Ananth Ramakrishnan

- Arunachal Pradesh won the toss and elected to field.
- Vipin Dhaka, Techi Sonam, Abhinav Srivastava (Arunachal Pradesh) and Harsh Dubey (Vidarbha) all made their T20 debuts.

4 November 2021
Scorecard

Tripura; 146/8 (20 overs)	v	Sikkim; 102/9 (20 overs)
Bikramkumar Das 55 (52); Sumit Singh 2/25 (4 overs)		Nilesh Lamichaney 22 (29); Amit Ali 4/14 (4 overs)

Tripura won by 44 runs
Devineni Venkata Ramana Praneetha Ground, Vijayawada
Umpires: Abhijeet Bengeri and GS Ananth Ramakrishnan

- Sikkim won the toss and elected to field.
- Codanda Ajit Karthik, Liyan Khan, Akash Luitel (Sikkim), Amit Ali, Bikramkumar Das, Samit Gohel and Saruk Hossain (Tripura) all made their T20 debuts.

4 November 2021
Scorecard

Nagaland; 150/3 (20 overs)	v	Manipur; 133/6 (20 overs)
Chetan Bist 66* (48); Rex Rajkumar 3/19 (4 overs)		Nitesh Sedai 64 (37); Abu Nechim 2/19 (4 overs)

Nagaland won by 17 runs
Dr. Y. S. Rajasekhara Reddy ACA–VDCA Cricket Stadium, Visakhapatnam
Umpires: VM Dhokre and Madanagopal Kuppuraj

- Nagaland won the toss and elected to bat.
- Chabungam Ishworjit (Manipur) made his T20 debut.

4 November 2021
Scorecard

Mizoram; 102/3 (20 overs)	v	Meghalaya; 106/1 (14.1 overs)
Uday Kaul 35 (41); Dippu Sangma 1/21 (4 overs)		Kishan Lyngdoh 52 (38); Bobby Zothansanga 1/16 (2 overs)

Meghalaya won by 9 wickets
Dr. Y. S. Rajasekhara Reddy ACA–VDCA Cricket Stadium, Visakhapatnam
Umpires: VM Dhokre and Madanagopal Kuppuraj

- Mizoram won the toss and elected to bat.
- Riboklang Hynniewta, Kishan Lyngdoh (Meghalaya), Vikash Kumar, Joseph Lalthankhuma and Remruatdika Ralte (Mizoram) all made their T20 debuts.

=== Round 2 ===
5 November 2021
Scorecard

Sikkim; 112 (20 overs)	v	Meghalaya; 116/4 (18.1 overs)
Codanda Ajit Karthik 27 (23); Akash Choudhary 3/19 (4 overs)		Dwaraka Ravi Teja 31* (30); Kranthi Kumar 2/22 (4 overs)

Meghalaya won by 6 wickets
Devineni Venkata Ramana Praneetha Ground, Vijayawada
Umpires: VM Dhokre and Madanagopal Kuppuraj

- Meghalaya won the toss and elected to field.

5 November 2021
Scorecard

Nagaland; 115/8 (20 overs)	v	Vidarbha; 117/5 (17.5 overs)
Chetan Bist 44 (46); Yash Thakur 2/23 (4 overs)		Ganesh Satish 39 (40); Khrievitso Kense 2/27 (4 overs)

Vidarbha won by 5 wickets
Devineni Venkata Ramana Praneetha Ground, Vijayawada
Umpires: VM Dhokre and Madanagopal Kuppuraj

- Nagaland won the toss and elected to bat.

5 November 2021
Scorecard

Arunachal Pradesh; 128 (19.4 overs)	v	Manipur; 131/4 (18 overs)
Nazeeb Saiyed 32 (21); Bishworjit Konthoujam 4/23 (3.4 overs)		Narisingh Yadav 50 (43); Myendung Singpho 3/36 (4 overs)

Manipur won by 6 wickets
Dr. Y. S. Rajasekhara Reddy ACA–VDCA Cricket Stadium, Visakhapatnam
Umpires: Puttarangaiah Jayapal and Kamlesh Sharma

- Arunachal Pradesh won the toss and elected to bat.

5 November 2021
Scorecard

Tripura; 138/7 (20 overs)	v	Mizoram; 109/7 (20 overs)
Rajat Dey 82* (46); Lalhruai Ralte 3/25 (4 overs)		Iqbal Abdulla 46* (39); Amit Ali 3/16 (4 overs)

Tripura won by 29 runs
Dr. Y. S. Rajasekhara Reddy ACA–VDCA Cricket Stadium, Visakhapatnam
Umpires: Puttarangaiah Jayapal and Kamlesh Sharma

- Tripura won the toss and elected to bat.

=== Round 3 ===
6 November 2021
Scorecard

Tripura; 168/2 (20 overs)	v	Manipur; 113/6 (20 overs)
K. B. Pawan 65* (43); Kishan Singha 1/28 (4 overs)		Johnson Singh 43* (41); Amit Ali 3/20 (4 overs)

Tripura won by 55 runs
Devineni Venkata Ramana Praneetha Ground, Vijayawada
Umpires: Puttarangaiah Jayapal and Kamlesh Sharma

- Tripura won the toss and elected to bat.

6 November 2021
Scorecard

Meghalaya; 96 (19.1 overs)	v	Vidarbha; 100/2 (11.1 overs)
Chirag Khurana 26 (20); Yash Thakur 3/12 (2.1 overs)		Atharva Taide 40* (38); Dippu Sangma 1/17 (2 overs)

Vidarbha won by 8 wickets
Devineni Venkata Ramana Praneetha Ground, Vijayawada
Umpires: Puttarangaiah Jayapal and Kamlesh Sharma

- Meghalaya won the toss and elected to bat.

6 November 2021
Scorecard

Nagaland; 156/5 (20 overs)	v	Mizoram; 117/5 (20 overs)
Shrikant Mundhe 76 (64); Iqbal Abdulla 1/20 (4 overs)		Khawlhring Lalremruata 44 (54); Nagaho Chishi 1/11 (2 overs)

Nagaland won by 39 runs
Dr. Y. S. Rajasekhara Reddy ACA–VDCA Cricket Stadium, Visakhapatnam
Umpires: Abhijeet Bengeri and GS Ananth Ramakrishnan

- Mizoram won the toss and elected to field.

6 November 2021
Scorecard

Arunachal Pradesh; 90 (19.1 overs)	v	Sikkim; 91/1 (14.1 overs)
Vipin Dhaka 21 (21); Akash Luitel 4/17 (4 overs)		Ashish Thapa 38* (33); Rajesh Bishnoi 1/17 (4 overs)

Sikkim won by 9 wickets
Dr. Y. S. Rajasekhara Reddy ACA–VDCA Cricket Stadium, Visakhapatnam
Umpires: Abhijeet Bengeri and GS Ananth Ramakrishnan

- Arunachal Pradesh won the toss and elected to bat.

=== Round 4 ===
8 November 2021
Scorecard

Mizoram; 108/5 (20 overs)	v	Sikkim; 112/0 (17.4 overs)
Uday Kaul 69 (59); Codanda Ajit Karthik 2/14 (4 overs)		Codanda Ajit Karthik 61* (57)

Sikkim won by 10 wickets
Devineni Venkata Ramana Praneetha Ground, Vijayawada
Umpires: Abhijeet Bengeri and GS Ananth Ramakrishnan

- Mizoram won the toss and elected to bat.
- Rinsangzela Hmamte (Mizoram) made his T20 debut.

8 November 2021
Scorecard

Nagaland; 165/7 (20 overs)	v	Arunachal Pradesh; 86 (15 overs)
Joshua Ozukum 91 (54); Techi Doria 3/33 (3 overs)		Song Tacho 26 (22); Imliwati Lemtur 4/20 (4 overs)

Nagaland won by 79 runs
Devineni Venkata Ramana Praneetha Ground, Vijayawada
Umpires: Abhijeet Bengeri and GS Ananth Ramakrishnan

- Nagaland won the toss and elected to bat.
- Nzanthung Mozhui (Nagaland), Tana Tatar and Vijay Rao (Arunachal Pradesh) all made their T20 debuts.

8 November 2021
Scorecard

Tripura; 146 (20 overs)	v	Meghalaya; 147/0 (18 overs)
K. B. Pawan 33 (26); Chirag Khurana 2/21 (4 overs)		Kishan Lyngdoh 85* (62)

Meghalaya won by 10 wickets
Dr. Y. S. Rajasekhara Reddy ACA–VDCA Cricket Stadium, Visakhapatnam
Umpires: VM Dhokre and Madanagopal Kuppuraj

- Tripura won the toss and elected to bat.
- Hemant Phukan (Meghalaya) made his T20 debut.

8 November 2021
Scorecard

Vidarbha; 222/4 (20 overs)	v	Manipur; 55 (16.3 overs)
Jitesh Sharma 71* (31); Kishan Singha 2/29 (4 overs)		Karnajit Yumnam 18 (12); Atharva Taide 2/0 (1 over)

Vidarbha won by 167 runs
Dr. Y. S. Rajasekhara Reddy ACA–VDCA Cricket Stadium, Visakhapatnam
Umpires: VM Dhokre and Madanagopal Kuppuraj

- Vidarbha won the toss and elected to bat.
- Chongtham Mehul, Sanatombaroy Laiphangbam (Manipur), Shubham Dubey and Siddhesh Neral (Vidarbha) all made their T20 debuts.

=== Round 5 ===
9 November 2021
Scorecard

Nagaland; 63 (18.4 overs)	v	Tripura; 67/1 (7.3 overs)
Imliwati Lemtur 16 (17); Ajoy Sarkar 3/10 (3 overs)		Samrat Singha 31* (25); Imliwati Lemtur 1/17 (2 overs)

Tripura won by 9 wickets
Devineni Venkata Ramana Praneetha Ground, Vijayawada
Umpires: Abhijeet Bengeri and GS Ananth Ramakrishnan

- Tripura won the toss and elected to field.

9 November 2021
Scorecard

Manipur; 100/6 (20 overs)	v	Mizoram; 105/2 (15 overs)
Langlonyamba Keishangbam 31 (33); Bobby Zothansanga 2/11 (4 overs)		Taruwar Kohli 38* (38); Homendro Kabrambam 1/11 (3 overs)

Mizoram won by 8 wickets
Devineni Venkata Ramana Praneetha Ground, Vijayawada
Umpires: VM Dhokre and Madanagopal Kuppuraj

- Manipur won the toss and elected to bat.
- B Lalnunfela (Mizoram) and Sunil Salam (Manipur) both made their T20 debuts.

9 November 2021
Scorecard

Vidarbha; 205/5 (20 overs)	v	Sikkim; 75/8 (20 overs)
Jitesh Sharma 54* (20); Palzor Tamang 2/32 (3 overs)		Liyan Khan 30 (36); Akshay Karnewar 4/5 (4 overs)

Vidarbha won by 130 runs
Dr. Y. S. Rajasekhara Reddy ACA–VDCA Cricket Stadium, Visakhapatnam
Umpires: Puttarangaiah Jayapal and Kamlesh Sharma

- Vidarbha won the toss and elected to bat.
- Sanjay Raghunath and Sooraj Rai (Vidarbha) both made their T20 debuts.

9 November 2021
Scorecard

Meghalaya; 194/3 (20 overs)	v	Arunachal Pradesh; 102/6 (20 overs)
Kishan Lyngdoh 82 (52); Akhilesh Sahani 2/25 (4 overs)		Techi Neri 26 (32); Chirag Khurana 2/12 (2 overs)

Meghalaya won by 92 runs
Dr. Y. S. Rajasekhara Reddy ACA–VDCA Cricket Stadium, Visakhapatnam
Umpires: Puttarangaiah Jayapal and Kamlesh Sharma

- Arunachal Pradesh won the toss and elected to field.
- Indiya Toku (Arunachal Pradesh) made his T20 debut.
