= List of Pondicherry cricketers =

This is a list of cricketers who have played first-class, List A or Twenty20 cricket for Puducherry cricket team.

Seasons given are first and last seasons; the player did not necessarily play in all the intervening seasons. Players in bold have played international cricket.

== A ==
- Fabid Ahmed, 2018–present
- A Aravinddaraj, 2018–present
- Sridhar Ashwath, 2021–present
- Subramanian Anand, 2019–21

== B ==
- Suboth Bhati, 2021–present

== C ==
- Magendiran Chinnadurai, 2018–19
- Saju Chothan, 2018–19

== D ==
- Paras Dogra, 2018–present
- Pavan Deshpande, 2020–present

== G ==
- Prabhakaran Gopalakrishnan, 2018–19
- AS Govindaraajan, 2018–present
- Raiphi Gomez, 2018–19

== J ==
- Akshay Jain, 2018–19
- Satish Jangir, 2018–19
- Sheldon Jackson (cricketer), 2020–21

== K ==
- Sai Karthik (cricketer), 2018–present
- Sukumaran Karthik, 2018–present
- Pawan Kumar (cricketer, born 1989), 2018–19
- Sashi Kumar (cricketer), 2018–19
- Santhosh Kumaran, 2018–19
- Selvam Suresh Kumar
- Arun Karthik, 2019–20
- Vinay Kumar, 2019–20

== M ==
- Jayaprakash Manikandan, 2021–present
- Madhavan Manohar, 2018–19
- Vikneshwaran Marimuthu, 2018–present
- Santha Moorthy, 2019–20

== N ==
- Iqlas Naha, 2018–present
- Angadu Narayanan, 2018–19
- **Abhishek Nayar**, 2018–19

== P ==
- Alagh Prathiban, 2020–present
- Manogaran Pooviarasan, 2021–present
- Logesh Prabagran, 2021–present

== R ==
- Ramachandran Ragupathy, 2019–20
- Premraj Rajavelu, 2021–present
- Ashith Rajiv, 2018–present
- Baskaran Ranjit, 2018–19
- Damodaren Rohit, 2018–present

== S ==
- Abhijeet Saranath, 2018–19
- Pratik Sargade, 2018–19
- Thalaivan Sargunam, 2018–19
- Raghu Sharma, 2021–present
- Pankaj Singh (cricketer), 2018–present
- Shashank Singh, 2018–19
- Anton Subikshan, 2021–present
- Nikhilesh Surendran, 2018–19
- Bharat Sharma, 2021–present

== T ==
- Parandaman Thamaraikannan, 2018–present
- Saiju Titus, 2018–19
- Sagar Trivedi, 2018–present

== U ==
- Sagar Udeshi, 2018–present

== V ==
- Prashanth Varma, 2018–19
- Vengadeshwaran, 2018–19
- Kannan Vignesh, 2020–21
