= List of Nagaland cricketers =

This is a list of cricketers who have played first-class, List A or Twenty20 cricket for the Nagaland cricket team, representing the Indian state of Nagaland. The team was established in July 2018 and played its first matches during the 2018–19 Indian cricket season.

The details given are the players name as it would usually appear on match scorecards. Note that some players will have played senior matches for other teams, including the India national cricket team.

As of 13 July 2023

== A ==
- Abu Nechim Ahmed
- Akash Singh

== B ==
- Rachit Bhatia
- Stuart Binny
- Chetan Bist

== C ==
- Arun Chauhan
- Hem Chetri
- Nagaho Chishi
- Toni Chishi

== D ==
- Dhavanath Nagender

== G ==
- Gaurav Vishwakarma
- Aditya Gupta (Note: CricInfo gives only the single name Aditya. CricketArchive gives both names for this player.)

== H ==
- Vayu Haralu
- Chopise Hopongkyu

== I ==
- Walling Imomenba

== J ==
- Merenka Jamir
- Temjentoshi Jamir
- Rohit Jhanjhariya
- Rongsen Jonathan

== K ==
- Abhishek Kaushik
- Abrar Kazi
- Khrievitso Kense

== L ==
- Imliwati Lemtur
- Nitesh Lochab
- Aosashi Longchar

== M ==
- Ravi Maurya
- Nzanthung Mozhui
- Renjamo Mozhui
- Shrikant Mundhe

== N ==
- Oren Ngullie

== O ==
- Joshua Ozukum

== P ==
- Bhavik Patel
- K. B. Pawan
- Mungkham Phom

== R ==
- Tahmeed Rahman
- Vijay Rai
- Kiran Reddy
- Sedezhalie Rupero

== S ==
- Paras Sehrawat
- Rahul Sharma
- Manjinder Singh
- Khriesavituo Solo
- Pawan Suyal
- Raja Swarnkar

== T ==
- Yogesh Takawale
- Moakumzuk Tzudir

== U ==
- Jalal Uddin (Note: Cricinfo gives the name Jalal Uddin, with a full name of Jalal Uddin Lashkar; CricketArchive gives the name Jalauddin Salamddin Lashkar.)

== W ==
- Mughavi Wotsa

== Y ==
- Akavi Yeptho
- Bohoto Yeptho
- Tejosel Yiethun

== Z ==
- Hokaito Zhimomi
- Inakato Zhimomi
- Vino Zhimomi
