= List of Sikkim cricketers =

This is a list of cricketers who have played first-class, List A or Twenty20 cricket for the Sikkim cricket team, representing the Indian state of Sikkim. The team was established in July 2018 and played its first matches during the 2018–19 Indian cricket season.

The details given are the players name. Note that some players will have played senior matches for other teams, including the India national cricket team.

As of 10 July 2023

== A ==
- Anureet Singh

== B ==
- Tashi Bhalla
- Karma Bhutia
- Mandup Bhutia
- Rinzing Bhutia
- Tshering Bhutia
- Robin Bist

== C ==
- Ishwar Chaudhary
- Arun Chettri
- Sabin Chettri

== D ==
- Rajiv Darjee
- Dinesh Dhobi
- Bibek Diyali

== F ==
- Faizan Khan

== G ==
- Puran Giri
- Binod Gupta
- Nitesh Gupta
- Prabesh Gurung

== I ==
- Iqbal Abdulla

== J ==
- Jahan Uddin

== K ==
- Codanda Ajit Karthik
- Kranthi Kumar

== L ==
- Nilesh Lamichaney
- Phur Lepch
- Lee Yong Lepcha
- Ruben Lepcha
- Som Lepcha
- Padam Limboo
- Liyan Khan
- Akash Luitel
- KN Luitel

== M ==
- Rajiv Malay
- Ankur Malik
- Milind Kumar
- Mohammad Kush
- Mohammad Saptulla

== N ==
- Pritam Nirala

== P ==
- Ajay Pradhan
- Bikash Pradhan
- Bijay Prasad

== R ==
- Amos Rai
- Dinesh Rai
- James Rai
- Pankaj Rawat
- Mohammad Ronak

== S ==
- Anwesh Sharma
- Bipul Sharma
- Jeetendra Sharma
- Tarun Sharma
- Varun Sood
- Anil Subba
- Bhushan Subba
- Bijay Subba
- Sumit Singh

== T ==
- Chitiz Tamang
- Nasun Tamang
- Palzor Tamang
- Rahul Tamang
- Ashish Thapa

== U ==
- Benoy Upreti

== Y ==
- Yashpal Singh
