= Jalal Uddin =

Jalal Uddin may refer to:

- Jalal Uddin (cricketer)
- Jalal Uddin (politician)
- Md. Jalal Uddin, Bangladeshi politician
