= Nipun Malhotra =

Nipun Malhotra may refer to:

- Nipun Malhotra (cricketer) (born 1993), Indian cricketer
- Nipun Malhotra (social entrepreneur) (born 1987), Indian social entrepreneur and disability rights activist
