= Prateek =

Prateek is an Indian given name. Notable people with this name include:

- Prateek Babbar (born 1986), Indian actor mostly in Hindi language films
- Prateek Baid, Indian model, actor, automobile engineer and beauty pageant titleholder
- Prateek Chaudhuri (1971–2021), Indian classical sitarist of the Senia Gharana (school)
- Prateek Jain (born 1994), Indian cricketer
- Prateek Kataria (born 1995), Indian cricketer
- Prateek Kuhad, Indian singer-songwriter and musician
- Prateek Reddy, Indian cricketer
- Prateek Sharma (born 1990), Indian television and film producer and director
- Prateek Bhushan Singh (born 1988), Indian politician
- Prateek Suri (born 1988), Indian-born entrepreneur and investor

== See also ==
- Jain Prateek Chihna or Jain symbols, symbols based on the Jain philosophy
- Dr Bhimrao Ambedkar Samajik Parivartan Prateek Sthal (Ambedkar Memorial Park), a public park and memorial in Gomti Nagar, Lucknow, Uttar Pradesh, India
- Prateeksha
- Pratique
