= Gaurav Singh =

Gaurav Singh may refer to:

- Gaurav Singh (Mizoram cricketer) (born 1999), Indian cricketer
- Gaurav Singh (Uttarakhand cricketer) (born 1996), Indian cricketer
