= Hrithik =

Hrithik is an Indian given name. Notable people with the given name include:

- Hrithik Kanojia (born 1999), Indian cricketer
- Hrithik Roshan (born 1974), Indian actor
- Hrithik Shokeen (born 2000), Indian cricketer
