= Vengadeshwaran =

Indian cricketer (born 1995)

Personal information
- Born: 23 December 1995 (age 30)
- Batting: Right-handed
- Bowling: Right-arm medium
- Source: Cricinfo

Vengadeshwaran (born 23 December 1995) is an Indian cricketer. He made his First-class debut for Puducherry in the 2018–19 Ranji Trophy on 12 November 2018.
