= Reuben Lalhruaizela =

Indian cricketer (born 1990)

Personal information
- Born: 11 October 1990 (age 36); Aizawl, Mizoram
- Source: Cricinfo, 11 November 2019

Reuben Lalhruaizela (born 11 October 1990) is an Indian cricketer. He made his Twenty20 debut on 11 November 2019, for Mizoram in the 2019–20 Syed Mushtaq Ali Trophy.
