= Lalfakzuala Renthlei =

Indian cricketer (born 1984)

Personal information
- Full name: Lalfakzuala Lalthianghlima Renthlei
- Born: 14 May 1984 (age 42); Aizawl, Mizoram
- Source: ESPNcricinfo, 11 November 2019

Lalfakzuala Renthlei (born 14 May 1984) is an Indian cricketer. He made his Twenty20 debut on 14 November 2019, for Mizoram in the 2019–20 Syed Mushtaq Ali Trophy. He made his first-class debut on 27 January 2020, for Mizoram in the 2019–20 Ranji Trophy.
