= Michael Lalremkima =

Indian cricketer (born 1986)

Personal information
- Full name: Michael Lalremkima
- Born: 15 February 1986 (age 40)
- Source: ESPNcricinfo, 19 September 2018

Michael Lalremkima (born 15 February 1986) is an Indian cricketer. He made his List A debut for Mizoram in the 2018–19 Vijay Hazare Trophy on 19 September 2018. He made his first-class debut for Mizoram in the 2018–19 Ranji Trophy on 1 November 2018. He shared the captaincy role for Mizoram, with the designated captain S Zorinliana, for the 2018–19 Ranji Trophy.
