= Rosiamliana Ralte =

Indian cricketer (born 1987)

Personal information
- Born: 21 February 1987 (age 39)
- Source: Cricinfo, 1 March 2021

Rosiamliana Ralte (born 21 February 1987) is an Indian cricketer. He made his List A debut on 1 March 2021, for Mizoram in the 2020–21 Vijay Hazare Trophy.
