= Oren Ngullie =

Indian cricketer (born 1994)

Personal information
- Full name: Oren Sankhao Ngullie
- Born: 20 December 1994 (age 31)
- Source: ESPNcricinfo, 30 September 2018

Oren Ngullie (born 20 December 1994) is an Indian cricketer. He made his List A debut for Nagaland in the 2018–19 Vijay Hazare Trophy on 30 September 2018. He made his Twenty20 debut on 11 November 2019, for Nagaland in the 2019–20 Syed Mushtaq Ali Trophy. He made his first-class debut on 27 January 2020, for Nagaland in the 2019–20 Ranji Trophy.
