= Ricky Lalthlamuana =

Indian cricketer (born 1984)

Personal information
- Born: 11 October 1984 (age 42)
- Source: Cricinfo, 27 February 2021

Ricky Lalthlamuana (born 11 October 1984) is an Indian cricketer. He made his List A debut on 27 February 2021, for Mizoram in the 2020–21 Vijay Hazare Trophy.
