= Lalchhuanliana =

Indian cricketer (born 1988)

Personal information
- Born: 11 May 1988 (age 38); Ramhlun, Aizawl, Mizoram
- Source: ESPNcricinfo, 21 February 2021

Lalchhuanliana (born 11 May 1988) is an Indian cricketer. He made his Twenty20 debut on 11 January 2021, for Mizoram in the 2020–21 Syed Mushtaq Ali Trophy. He made his List A debut on 21 February 2021, for Mizoram in the 2020–21 Vijay Hazare Trophy.
