= Henry Lalsangzuala =

Indian cricketer (born 1994)

Personal information
- Full name: Henry Dawngliana Lalsangzuala
- Born: 24 January 1994 (age 32); Aizawl, Mizoram
- Source: ESPNcricinfo, 4 February 2020

Henry Lalsangzuala (born 24 January 1994) is an Indian cricketer. He made his Twenty20 debut on 11 November 2019, for Mizoram in the 2019–20 Syed Mushtaq Ali Trophy. He made his first-class debut on 4 February 2020, for Mizoram in the 2019–20 Ranji Trophy.
