= Jonathan Lalrinchhana =

Indian cricketer (born 1986)

Personal information
- Born: 12 February 1986 (age 40)
- Source: ESPNcricinfo, 27 February 2021

Jonathan Lalrinchhana (born 12 February 1986) is an Indian cricketer. He made his List A debut on 27 February 2021, for Mizoram in the 2020–21 Vijay Hazare Trophy.
