= Kishan Thokchom =

Indian cricketer (born 1990)

Personal information
- Full name: Kishan Thokchom Singh
- Born: 1 January 1990 (age 36); Imphal, Manipur
- Source: ESPNcricinfo, 12 November 2018

Kishan Thokchom Singh (born 1 January 1990) is an Indian cricketer. He made his first-class debut for Manipur in the 2018–19 Ranji Trophy on 12 November 2018. He made his Twenty20 debut for Manipur in the 2018–19 Syed Mushtaq Ali Trophy on 21 February 2019. He made his List A debut on 28 September 2019, for Manipur in the 2019–20 Vijay Hazare Trophy.
