= Mohammad Shoyeb =

Indian cricketer (born 1997)

Personal information
- Full name: Mohammad Shoyeb
- Born: 14 October 1997 (age 28)
- Batting: Right-handed
- Bowling: Slow left arm orthodox
- Role: Bowler

Domestic team information
- Years: Team
- 2018/19: Arunachal Pradesh
- Source: CricketArchive (subscription required), 1 November 2018

Mohammad Shoyeb (born 14 October 1997) is an Indian cricketer who made his first-class debut for Arunachal Pradesh in the 2018–19 Ranji Trophy on 1 November 2018. To the end of the 2022/23 season, that remains his sole appearance in senior cricket.
