= Jason Lamare =

Indian cricketer (born 1983)

Personal information
- Born: 31 May 1983 (age 43); Shillong, Meghalaya
- Source: ESPNcricinfo, 2 November 2018

Jason Lamare (born 31 May 1983) is an Indian cricketer. He made his first-class debut for Assam in the 2004–05 Ranji Trophy on 31 December 2004. He captained Meghalaya in the 2018–19 Ranji Trophy. He made his Twenty20 debut for Meghalaya in the 2018–19 Syed Mushtaq Ali Trophy on 21 February 2019.

Outside of cricket, Lamare runs an extreme sports business in Shillong.
