= Madhavan Manohar =

Indian cricketer (born 1987)

Personal information
- Full name: Madhavan Manohar
- Born: 27 July 1987 (age 39); Vaithikuppam, Puducherry, India
- Source: ESPNcricinfo, 28 September 2018

Madhavan Manohar (born 27 July 1987) is an Indian cricketer. He made his List A debut for Puducherry in the 2018–19 Vijay Hazare Trophy on 28 September 2018. He made his first-class debut for Puducherry in the 2018–19 Ranji Trophy on 22 December 2018.
