= Himanshu Hari =

Indian cricketer (born 1994)

Personal information
- Full name: Himanshu Hari
- Born: 1 April 1994 (age 32); Patna
- Batting: Right-handed
- Bowling: Right-arm

Domestic team information
- Years: Team
- 2018-present: Bihar
- Source: ESPNcricinfo, 1 November 2018

Himanshu Hari (born 1 April 1994) is an Indian cricketer. He made his first-class debut for Bihar in the 2018–19 Ranji Trophy on 1 November 2018.
