= Sashi Kumar (cricketer) =

Indian cricketer (born 1982)

Personal information
- Born: 17 February 1982 (age 44)
- Source: Cricinfo, 20 November 2018

Sashi Kumar (born 17 February 1982) is an Indian cricketer. He made his first-class debut for Puducherry in the 2018–19 Ranji Trophy on 20 November 2018.
