= Tarique Siddique =

Indian cricketer (born 1994)

Personal information
- Full name: Tarique Siddique
- Born: 2 October 1994 (age 32); Shillong, Meghalaya
- Source: Cricinfo, 20 November 2018

Tarique Siddique (born 2 October 1994) is an Indian cricketer. He made his first-class debut for Meghalaya in the 2018–19 Ranji Trophy on 20 November 2018.
