= Baskaran Ranjit =

Indian cricketer (born 1991)

Personal information
- Born: 16 August 1991 (age 35); Cuddalore, Tamil Nadu
- Source: ESPNcricinfo, 12 November 2018

Baskaran Ranjit (born 16 August 1991) is an Indian cricketer. He made his first-class debut for Puducherry in the 2018–19 Ranji Trophy on 12 November 2018.
