= Vipin Dhaka =

Indian cricketer (born 1996)

Personal information
- Full name: Vipin Ajay Dhaka
- Born: 4 September 1996 (age 30); Birbhum, West Bengal, India
- Source: Cricinfo, 27 February 2021

Vipin Dhaka (born 4 September 1996) is an Indian cricketer. He made his List A debut on 27 February 2021, for Arunachal Pradesh in the 2020–21 Vijay Hazare Trophy. He made his Twenty20 debut on 4 November 2021, for Arunachal Pradesh in the 2021–22 Syed Mushtaq Ali Trophy. He made his Ranji Trophy debug on 27 December 2022, for Arunachal Pradesh.
