= Yogesh Nagar =

Indian cricketer (born 1990)

Personal information
- Born: 6 January 1990 (age 36); Wazirabad, Delhi, India
- Batting: Right-handed
- Bowling: Right arm Offbreak
- Role: Allrounder

Domestic team information
- Years: Team
- 2008/09-2019: Delhi
- 2009–2012: Delhi Daredevils

Career statistics
Competition	FC	LA	T20
Matches	26	28	55
Runs scored	1,577	635	652
Batting average	46.38	39.68	19.17
100s/50s	5/9	1/3	0/0
Top score	166	109*	44*
Balls bowled	444	499	350
Wickets	5	18	21
Bowling average	41.60	22.55	16.66
5 wickets in innings	0	1	0
10 wickets in match	0	–	–
Best bowling	1/0	5/48	3/13
Catches/stumpings	14/–	15/–	19/–
- Source: ESPNcricinfo, 20 March 2025

Yogesh Nagar (born 6 January 1990 in Wazirabad, Delhi) is an Indian cricketer. He is an allrounder who is a right-hand batsman and off spinner. He plays for the Delhi Ranji Trophy side and the Delhi under-16 side. He played for the Delhi Daredevils in the Indian Premier League.
