= Rachit Bhatia =

Indian cricketer (born 1997)

Personal information
- Full name: Rachit Bhatia
- Born: 7 September 1997 (age 29)
- Source: Cricinfo, 1 November 2018

Rachit Bhatia (born 7 September 1997) is an Indian cricketer. He made his first-class debut for Nagaland in the 2018–19 Ranji Trophy on 1 November 2018. He made his Twenty20 debut for Nagaland in the 2018–19 Syed Mushtaq Ali Trophy on 22 February 2019.
