= S Santhosh Kumaran =

Indian cricketer (born 1998)

Personal information
- Full name: S Santhosh Kumaran
- Born: 3 April 1998 (age 28)
- Source: Cricinfo, 14 December 2018

S Santhosh Kumaran (born 3 April 1998) is an Indian cricketer. He made his first-class debut for Puducherry in the 2018–19 Ranji Trophy on 14 December 2018. He made his Twenty20 debut for Puducherry in the 2018–19 Syed Mushtaq Ali Trophy on 21 February 2019.
