= Shivam Khurana =

Indian cricketer (born 1991)

Personal information
- Born: 24 February 1991 (age 35); Haridwar, Uttarakhand, India
- Source: Cricinfo, 1 November 2018

Shivam Khurana (born 24 February 1991) is an Indian cricketer. He made his first-class debut for Uttarakhand in the 2018–19 Ranji Trophy on 1 November 2018. He made his Twenty20 debut for Uttarakhand in the 2018–19 Syed Mushtaq Ali Trophy on 21 February 2019.
