= Ngangom Rajesh Singh =

Indian cricketer (born 1976)

Rajesh Singh
Personal information
- Full name: Ngangom Rajesh Singh
- Born: 1 March 1976 (age 50); Imphal, Manipur
- Source: ESPNcricinfo, 7 January 2019

Ngangom Rajesh Singh (born 1 March 1976) is an Indian cricketer. He made his first-class debut for Manipur in the 2018–19 Ranji Trophy on 7 January 2019. He made his Twenty20 debut for Manipur in the 2018–19 Syed Mushtaq Ali Trophy on 24 February 2019.
