= Pawan Kumar (cricketer, born 1989) =

Indian cricketer (born 1989)

Personal information
- Full name: Koppineedi Pawan Kumar
- Born: 2 September 1989 (age 37)
- Source: Cricinfo, 12 November 2018

Pawan Kumar (born 2 September 1989) is an Indian cricketer. He made his first-class debut for Puducherry in the 2018–19 Ranji Trophy on 12 November 2018.
