= Akhil Rajput =

Indian cricketer (born 1991)

Personal information
- Full name: Akhil Lalchand Rajput
- Born: 21 October 1991 (age 35)
- Relatives: Lalchand Rajput (father)
- Source: ESPNcricinfo, 19 September 2018

Akhil Rajput (born 21 October 1991) is an Indian cricketer. He made his List A debut for Mizoram in the 2018–19 Vijay Hazare Trophy on 19 September 2018. He made his first-class debut for Mizoram in the 2018–19 Ranji Trophy on 1 November 2018. He made his Twenty20 debut for Mizoram in the 2018–19 Syed Mushtaq Ali Trophy on 21 February 2019.
