= Mughavi Wotsa =

Indian cricketer (born 1992)

Personal information
- Full name: Mughavi Wotsa
- Born: 6 December 1992 (age 33); Dimapur, Nagaland
- Batting: Right handed
- Bowling: Right arm medium
- Role: Opening batter

Domestic team information
- Years: Team
- 2018–19: Nagaland
- Source: ESPNcricinfo, 23 September 2018

Mughavi Wotsa (born 6 December 1992) is an Indian cricketer. He made his List A debut for Nagaland in the 2018–19 Vijay Hazare Trophy on 23 September 2018. He made his first-class debut for Nagaland in the 2018–19 Ranji Trophy on 1 November 2018. He made his Twenty20 debut for Nagaland in the 2018–19 Syed Mushtaq Ali Trophy on 21 February 2019.
