= Heman Luwang =

Indian cricketer (born 1988)

Personal information
- Full name: Thounaojam Heman Luwang
- Born: 1 March 1988 (age 38); Imphal, Manipur
- Source: ESPNcricinfo, 7 January 2019

Thounaojam Heman Luwang (born 1 March 1988) is an Indian cricketer. He made his first-class debut for Manipur in the 2018–19 Ranji Trophy on 7 January 2019.
