= Lalhmangaiha =

Indian cricketer (born 1983)

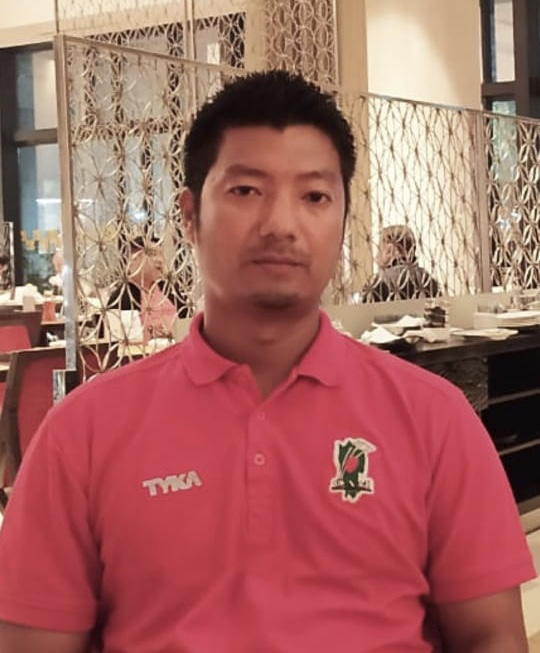

Personal information
- Born: 17 November 1983 (age 42)
- Batting: Left-handed
- Bowling: Left-arm spin
- Role: Opening batsman
- Source: ESPNcricinfo, 3 October 2019

Lalhmangaiha (born 17 November 1983) is an Indian cricketer. He made his List A debut on 2 October 2018, for Mizoram in the 2018–19 Vijay Hazare Trophy. He made his first-class debut on 1 November 2018, for Mizoram in the 2018–19 Ranji Trophy. He made his Twenty20 debut on 27 February 2019, also for Mizoram, in the 2018–19 Syed Mushtaq Ali Trophy.
