= Deendyal Upadhyay =

Indian cricketer (born 1999)

Personal information
- Born: 15 July 1999 (age 27)
- Source: ESPNcricinfo, 14 December 2018

Deendyal Upadhyay (born 15 July 1999) is an Indian cricketer. He made his first-class debut for Arunachal Pradesh in the 2018–19 Ranji Trophy on 14 December 2018. He was the leading wicket-taker for Arunachal Pradesh in the tournament, with 23 dismissals in four matches. He made his Twenty20 debut for Arunachal Pradesh in the 2018–19 Syed Mushtaq Ali Trophy on 28 February 2019.
