= Kartik Joshi =

Indian cricketer (born 1995)

Personal information
- Full name: Kartik Joshi
- Born: 4 December 1995 (age 30); Haldwani, Uttarakhand, India
- Source: ESPNcricinfo, 1 November 2018

Kartik Joshi (born 4 December 1995) is an Indian cricketer. He made his List A debut for Uttarakhand in the 2018–19 Vijay Hazare Trophy on 6 October 2018. He made his first-class debut for Uttarakhand in the 2018–19 Ranji Trophy on 1 November 2018. On 29 November 2018, in the match against Arunachal Pradesh, he scored his maiden double century in first-class cricket.
