= K. Lalhmingmawia =

Indian cricketer (born 1989)

K Lalhmingmawia
Personal information
- Born: 14 March 1989 (age 37); Armed Veng, Aizawl, Mizoram
- Source: ESPNcricinfo, 3 October 2019

K Lalhmingmawia (born 14 March 1989) is an Indian cricketer. He made his first-class debut on 1 November 2018, for Mizoram in the 2018–19 Ranji Trophy. He made his Twenty20 debut on 21 February 2019, also for Mizoram, in the 2018–19 Syed Mushtaq Ali Trophy. He made his List A debut on 10 October 2019, for Mizoram in the 2019–20 Vijay Hazare Trophy.
