= Hayat Ansari =

Indian cricketer (born 1997)

Personal information
- Full name: Hayat Ansari
- Born: 2 October 1997 (age 29)
- Source: ESPNcricinfo, 12 November 2018

Hayat Ansari (born 2 October 1997) is an Indian cricketer. He made his first-class debut for Arunachal Pradesh in the 2018–19 Ranji Trophy on 12 November 2018.
