= Sumit Lama =

Indian cricketer (born 1996)

Personal information
- Full name: Sumit Lama
- Born: 26 February 1996 (age 30); Nagaland
- Source: Cricinfo, 24 September 2019

Sumit Lama (born 26 February 1996) is an Indian cricketer. He made his List A debut on 24 September 2019, for Mizoram in the 2019–20 Vijay Hazare Trophy. He made his Twenty20 debut on 8 November 2019, for Mizoram in the 2019–20 Syed Mushtaq Ali Trophy.
