= Pankaj Singh (cricketer) =

Indian cricketer

Personal information
- Born: 6 May 1985 (age 41); Sultanpur, Uttar Pradesh, India
- Batting: Right-handed
- Bowling: Right-arm medium-fast
- Role: Bowler

International information
- National side: India
- Test debut (cap 282): 27 July 2014 v England
- Last Test: 7 August 2014 v England
- Only ODI (cap 187): 5 June 2010 v Sri Lanka

Domestic team information
- Years: Team
- 2008,2011-2012: Rajasthan Royals
- 2009,2013: Royal Challengers Bangalore

Career statistics
| Competition | Test | ODI | FC | LA |
|---|---|---|---|---|
| Matches | 2 | 1 | 117 | 79 |
| Runs scored | 10 | 3 | 1513 | 472 |
| Batting average | 3.33 | – | 12.30 | 12.10 |
| 100s/50s | 0/0 | 0/0 | 0/3 | 0/1 |
| Top score | 9 | 3* | 74 | 66 |
| Balls bowled | 450 | 42 | 22736 | 3,943 |
| Wickets | 2 | 0 | 472 | 118 |
| Bowling average | 146.00 | – | 23.76 | 26.99 |
| 5 wickets in innings | 0 | 0 | 28 | 2 |
| 10 wickets in match | 0 | – | 5 | 0 |
| Best bowling | 2/113 | – | 8/32 | 6/50 |
| Catches/stumpings | 2/– | 1/– | 27/– | 16/– |
- Source: ESPNcricinfo, 20 October 2022

Pankaj Singh (born 6 May 1985) is an Indian former cricketer. In December 2018, he became the first seam bowler to take 400 wickets in the Ranji Trophy. He retired from all forms of cricket in July 2021.

== Domestic and IPL Career ==
He played for the Rajasthan Royals in the Indian Premier League (IPL). A tall and strapping right-arm medium-fast bowler from Rajasthan, has progressed from the Under-19 level to the India A side with consistent performances since he made his first-class debut in August 2003. By 2006 he started showing signs of having matured, taking Rajasthan to the final of the Ranji Plate league, with 21 wickets at 20.95. In 2007, he was part of India A's twin tour of Zimbabwe and Kenya and a total of 18 wickets in the unofficial Tests and ODIs in Kenya earned him a spot for the home series against South Africa A. With Sreesanth and Munaf Patel injured, he earned a call-up to India's Test squad to tour Australia. He signed with the Rajasthan Royals in the inaugural IPL before transferring to Royal Challengers Bangalore for the second season. His next big break came when he was included in the limited-overs sides for India's tour of Zimbabwe, when the selectors decided to rest several senior players.

He was the joint-leading wicket-taker for Rajasthan in the 2017–18 Ranji Trophy, with 13 dismissals in five matches.

Ahead of the 2018–19 Ranji Trophy, he transferred from Rajasthan to Puducherry. In November 2018, during the Ranji Trophy match against Mizoram, he set a new record for the most five-wicket hauls against different teams in the Ranji Trophy with 17. Overall, it was his 27th five-wicket haul. He was the leading wicket-taker for Puducherry in the tournament, with 45 dismissals in eight matches.

== International career ==
He was selected to the Indian Test cricket squad for the Border–Gavaskar Trophy series of 2007–08 in Australia, but was not selected to play.

After a recent good show in domestic tournaments, he was included in the Indian squad touring England in July 2014. He made his test debut vs England at the Ageas Bowl in the 3rd Test of the series after Ishant Sharma was ruled out due to an injury. He was handed his debut test cap by Mahendra Singh Dhoni.

Pankaj Singh could have had Alastair Cook as his first Test wicket had Ravindra Jadeja not dropped the catch off Singh's bowling. On his debut Pankaj achieved a unique record of being the most expensive bowler in test debut without a single wicket. He conceded 179 runs during the match against England in July 2014. His maiden wicket came in his second match and with his 416th ball when he dismissed Joe Root on 77. He also dismissed wicketkeeper-batsman Jos Buttler a few overs later.
