= Girish Rauturi =

Indian cricketer (born 1997)

Personal information
- Born: 11 August 1997 (age 29)
- Source: ESPNcricinfo, 28 November 2018

Girish Rauturi (born 11 August 1997) is an Indian cricketer. He made his first-class debut for Uttarakhand in the 2018–19 Ranji Trophy on 28 November 2018. He made his Twenty20 debut for Uttarakhand in the 2018–19 Syed Mushtaq Ali Trophy on 21 February 2019.
