= Kshitiz Sharma =

Indian cricketer

Personal information
- Born: 21 April 1990 (age 35); Delhi, India
- Batting: Right-handed
- Bowling: Right-arm offbreak
- Role: Top–order batsman

Domestic team information
- Years: Team
- 2013–2018: Delhi
- 2018–2019: Arunachal Pradesh
- 2020–present: Delhi
- Source: ESPNcricinfo, 12 January 2023

Kshitiz Sharma (born 21 April 1990) is an Indian cricketer.

He made his Twenty20 cricket debut for Delhi in the Syed Mushtaq Ali Trophy on 22 March 2013. In January 2018, he was bought by the Chennai Super Kings in the 2018 IPL auction.

He made his List A debut for Delhi in the 2017–18 Vijay Hazare Trophy on 7 February 2018. Ahead of the 2018–19 Ranji Trophy, he transferred from Delhi to Arunachal Pradesh. He made his first-class debut for Arunachal Pradesh in the 2018–19 Ranji Trophy on 1 November 2018. He was the leading run-scorer for Arunachal Pradesh in the tournament, with 498 runs in seven matches.
