= Dhanraj Sharma =

Indian cricketer (born 1987)

Personal information
- Full name: Dhanraj Sharma
- Born: 20 July 1987 (age 39)
- Source: ESPNcricinfo, 20 September 2018

Dhanraj Sharma (born 20 July 1987) is an Indian cricketer. He made his List A debut for Uttarakhand in the 2018–19 Vijay Hazare Trophy on 20 September 2018. He made his first-class debut for Uttarakhand in the 2018–19 Ranji Trophy on 1 November 2018. He made his Twenty20 debut on 8 November 2019, for Uttarakhand in the 2019–20 Syed Mushtaq Ali Trophy.
