= Saiju Titus =

Indian cricketer (born 1981)

Personal information
- Full name: Saiju Titus
- Born: 6 October 1981 (age 45); Puducherry, India
- Source: Cricinfo, 21 September 2018

Saiju Titus (born 6 October 1981) is an Indian cricketer. He made his List A debut for Puducherry in the 2018–19 Vijay Hazare Trophy on 21 September 2018. He made his first-class debut for Puducherry in the 2018–19 Ranji Trophy on 22 December 2018.
