= Saidingliana Sailo =

Indian cricketer (born 1997)

Personal information
- Full name: Saidingliana Sailo
- Born: 27 November 1997 (age 28)
- Source: Cricinfo, 19 September 2018

Saidingliana Sailo (born 27 November 1997) is an Indian cricketer. He made his List A debut for Mizoram in the 2018–19 Vijay Hazare Trophy on 19 September 2018. He made his first-class debut for Mizoram in the 2018–19 Ranji Trophy on 1 November 2018. He made his Twenty20 debut for Mizoram in the 2018–19 Syed Mushtaq Ali Trophy on 21 February 2019.
