= Jalal Uddin (politician) =

Bangladeshi politician

Member of Bangladesh Parliament
- In office 18 February 1979 – 12 February 1982

Personal details
- Party: Bangladesh Nationalist Party

Jalal Uddin (Bengali: জালাল উদ্দিন) is a Bangladesh Nationalist Party politician and a former member of parliament for Dhaka-32.

== Career ==
Uddin was elected to parliament from Dhaka-32 as a Bangladesh Nationalist Party candidate in 1979.
