= Mayank Raghav =

Indian cricketer (born 1988)

Personal information
- Born: 4 June 1988 (age 38); Delhi
- Source: ESPNcricinfo, 6 December 2018

Mayank Raghav (born 4 June 1988) is an Indian cricketer. He made his first-class debut for Manipur in the 2018–19 Ranji Trophy on 6 December 2018, scoring a century in the first innings. He went on to convert it into his maiden double century, scoring 228 runs. He made his Twenty20 debut for Manipur in the 2018–19 Syed Mushtaq Ali Trophy on 21 February 2019.

== See also ==
- List of double centuries scored on first-class cricket debut
