= Tahmeed Rahman =

Indian cricketer (born 1998)

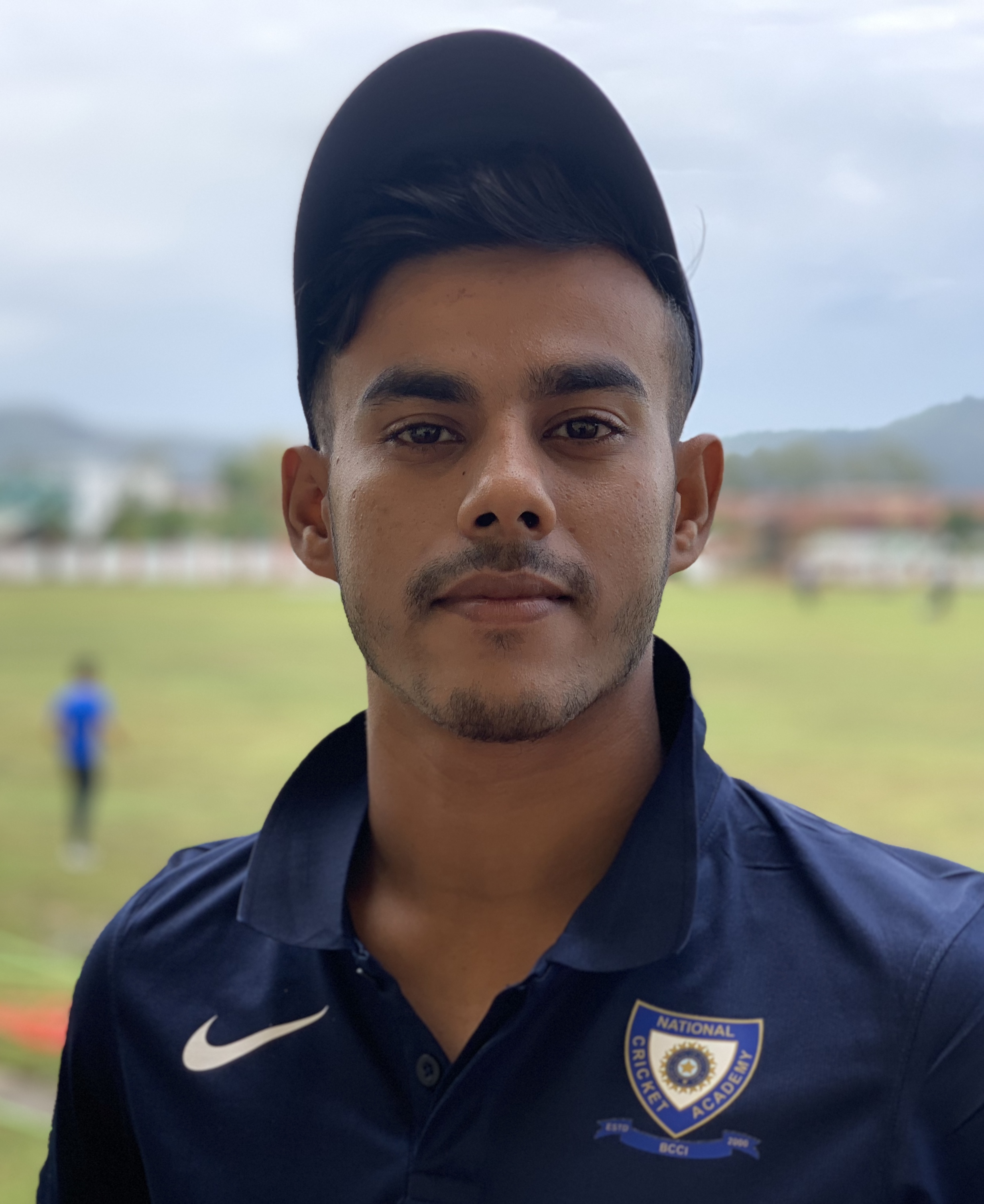

Personal information
- Full name: Tahmeed Rahman
- Born: 26 September 1998 (age 28); Dimapur, Nagaland, India
- Batting: Right-handed
- Bowling: Right-arm off-spin
- Role: Allrounder
- Source: Cricinfo, 19 September 2018

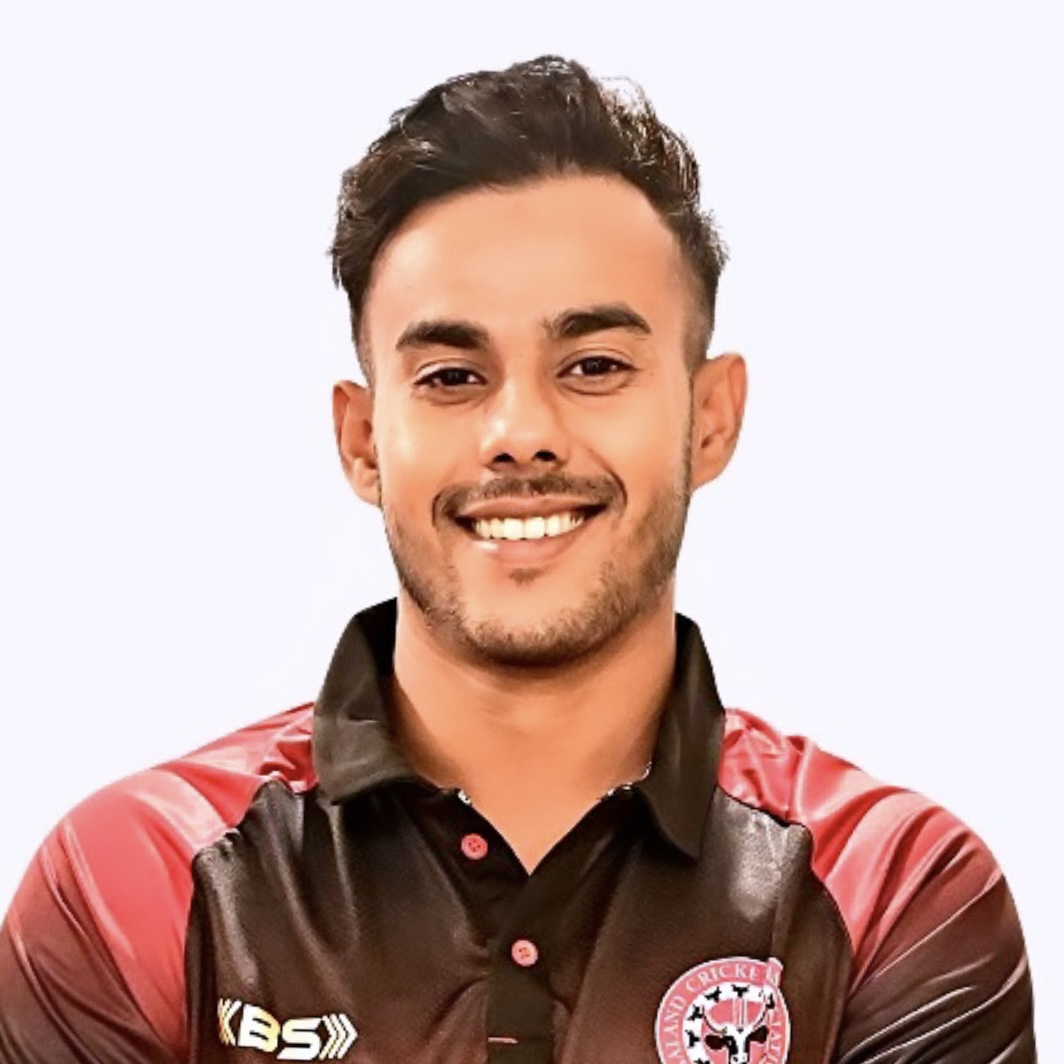
Tahmeed Rahman

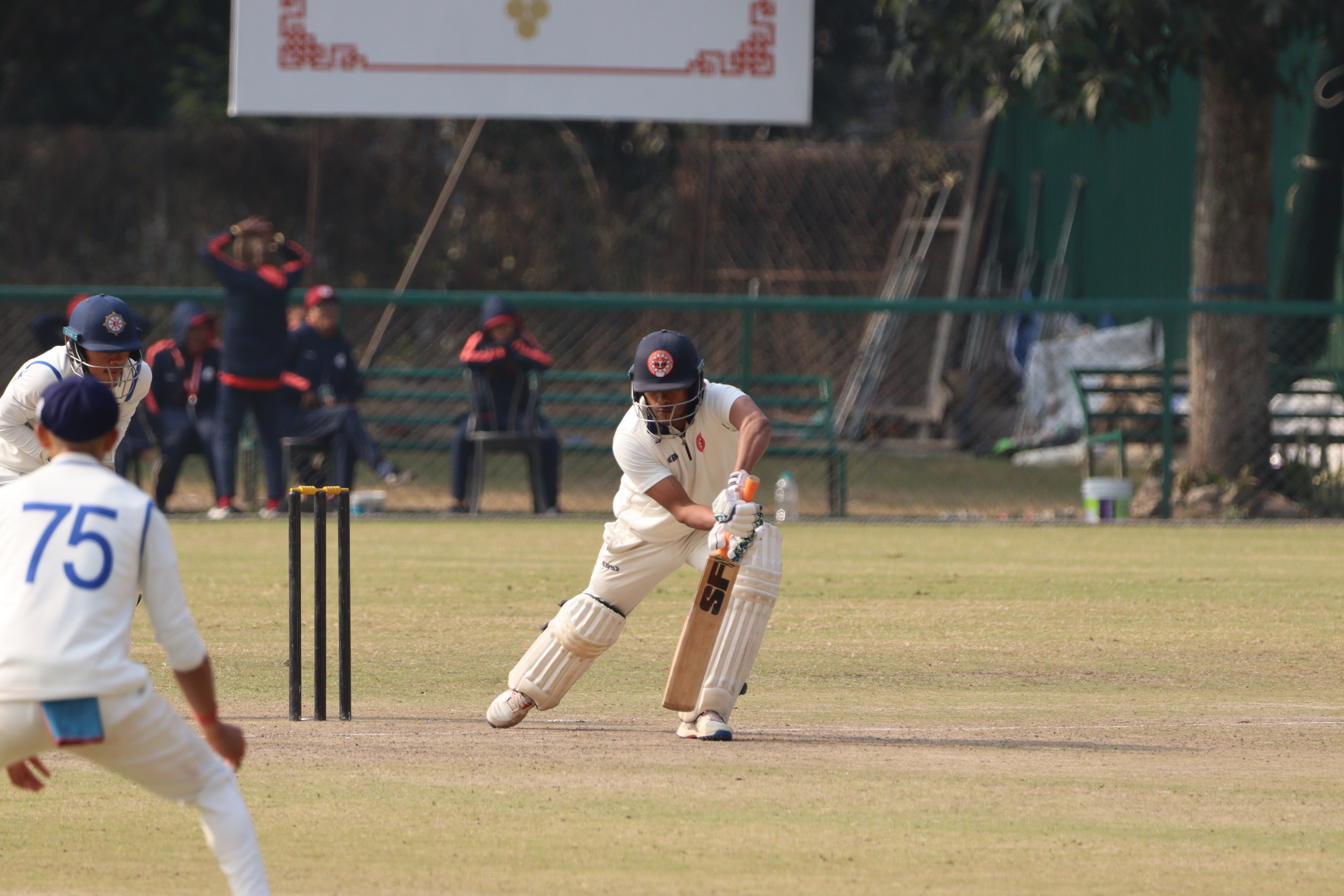

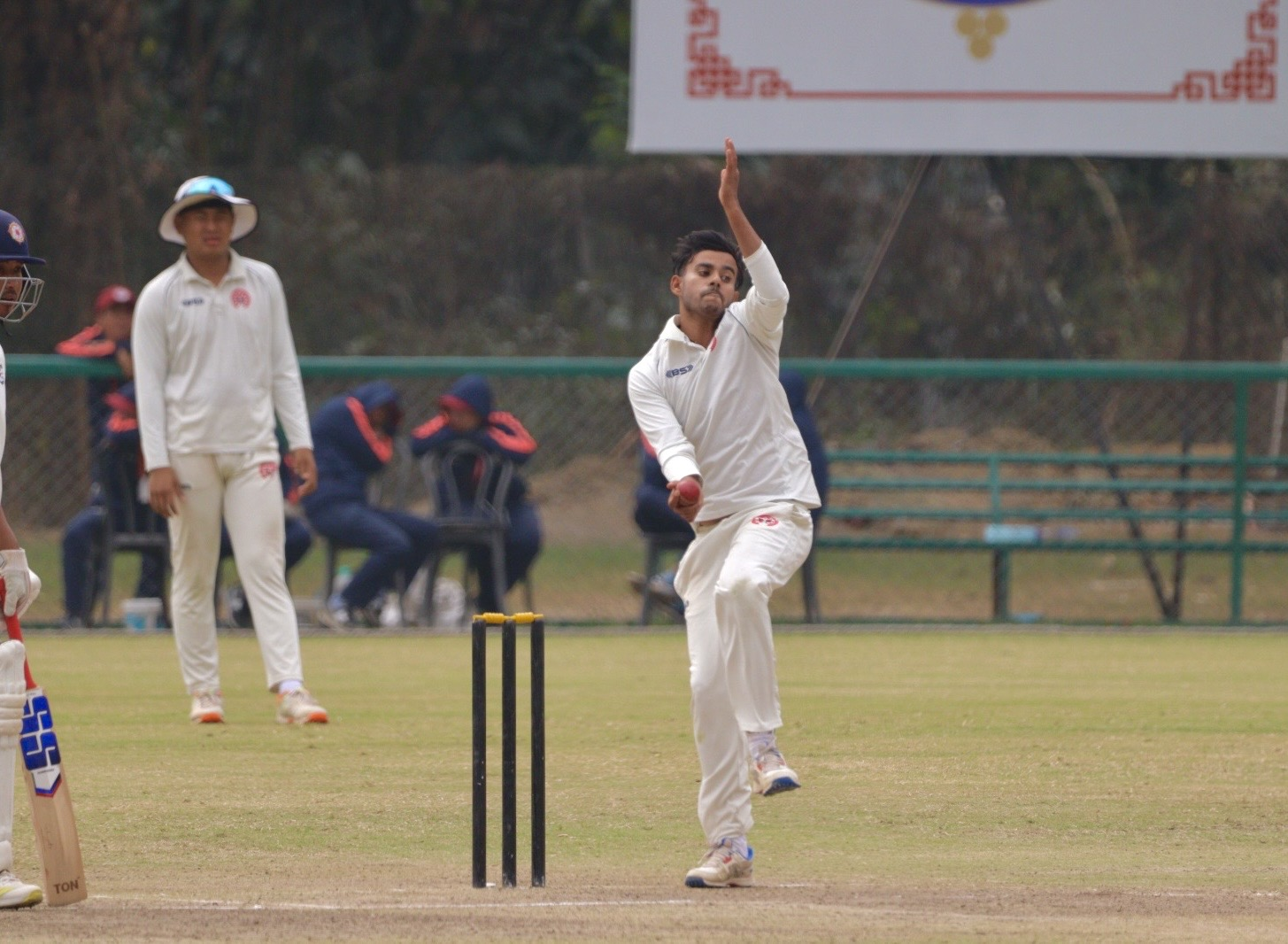

Tahmeed Rahman (born 26 September 1998) is an Indian cricketer. He made his List A debut for Nagaland in the 2018–19 Vijay Hazare Trophy on 19 September 2018. He made his first-class debut for Nagaland in the 2018–19 Ranji Trophy on 1 November 2018. In round five of the 2018–19 Ranji Trophy, in the match against Manipur, Rahman took a hat-trick. He made his Twenty20 debut for Nagaland in the 2018–19 Syed Mushtaq Ali Trophy on 21 February 2019.
