= Hmar Zothanchhunga =

Indian cricketer (born 1985)

Personal information
- Born: 26 December 1985 (age 40)
- Source: ESPNcricinfo, 14 December 2018

Hmar Zothanchhunga (born 26 December 1985) is an Indian cricketer. He made his first-class debut for Mizoram in the 2018–19 Ranji Trophy on 14 December 2018. He made his Twenty20 debut on 11 January 2021, for Mizoram in the 2020–21 Syed Mushtaq Ali Trophy.
