= Damodaran Rohit =

Indian cricketer (born 1992)

Personal information
- Full name: Damodaran Rohit
- Batting: Right-handed
- Bowling: Right-arm offbreak

Domestic team information
- Years: Team
- 2013/14: Chilaw Marians Cricket Club
- Source: ESPNcricinfo, 30 January 2020

Damodaran Rohit is an Indian cricketer. He made his first-class debut for Chilaw Marians Cricket Club in the 2013–14 Premier Trophy on 24 January 2014. He made his List A debut for Puducherry in the 2018–19 Vijay Hazare Trophy on 19 September 2018. He made his first-class debut for Puducherry in the 2018–19 Ranji Trophy on 12 November 2018, scoring 138 runs in the first innings. He made his Twenty20 debut for Puducherry in the 2018–19 Syed Mushtaq Ali Trophy on 21 February 2019.
