= Laxman Chettri =

Indian cricketer (born 1992)

Personal information
- Full name: Laxman Dhan Chettri
- Born: 26 January 1992 (age 34); East Khasi Hills, Meghalaya
- Source: ESPNcricinfo, 20 December 2018

Laxman Chettri (born 26 January 1992) is an Indian cricketer. He made his first-class debut for Meghalaya in the 2018–19 Ranji Trophy on 20 December 2018.
