= Vivek Mohan =

Indian cricketer (born 1997)

Personal information
- Full name: Vivek Mohan
- Born: 14 March 1997 (age 29)
- Source: Cricinfo, 1 November 2018

Vivek Mohan (born 14 March 1997) is an Indian cricketer. He made his first-class debut for Bihar in the 2018–19 Ranji Trophy on 1 November 2018.
