= Konjengbam Sashikant Singh =

Indian cricketer (born 1992)

Personal information
- Full name: Konjengbam Sashikant Singh
- Born: 20 November 1992 (age 33); Imphal, Manipur
- Batting: Right handed

Domestic team information
- Years: Team
- 2018–19: Manipur
- Source: ESPNcricinfo, 12 November 2018

Konjengbam Sashikant Singh (born 20 November 1992) is an Indian cricketer. He made his first-class debut for Manipur in the 2018–19 Ranji Trophy on 12 November 2018.
