= Khawlhring Vanlalruata =

Indian cricketer (born 1985)

K Vanlalruata
Personal information
- Born: 22 April 1985 (age 41)
- Source: ESPNcricinfo, 3 October 2019

K Vanlalruata (born 22 April 1985) is an Indian cricketer. He made his List A debut on 19 September 2018, for Mizoram in the 2018–19 Vijay Hazare Trophy. He made his first-class debut on 1 November 2018, for Mizoram in the 2018–19 Ranji Trophy. He made his Twenty20 debut on 21 February 2019, also for Mizoram, in the 2018–19 Syed Mushtaq Ali Trophy. He was the captain of Mizoram for the 2018–19 Vijay Hazare Trophy.
