= Maheshkumar Singh =

Indian cricketer (born 1992)

Personal information
- Full name: Ngangbam Maheshkumar Singh
- Born: 11 November 1992 (age 34); Imphal, Manipur
- Batting: Right handed
- Bowling: Right arm medium

Domestic team information
- Years: Team
- 2018–19: Manipur
- Source: ESPNcricinfo, 30 December 2018

Ngangbam Maheshkumar Singh (born 11 November 1992) is an Indian cricketer. He made his first-class debut for Manipur in the 2018–19 Ranji Trophy on 30 December 2018.
