= Deepak Dhapola =

Indian cricketer (born 1990)

Personal information
- Born: 26 June 1990 (age 36); Bageshwar, Uttarakhand, India
- Source: ESPNcricinfo, 20 September 2018

Deepak Dhapola (born 26 June 1990) is an Indian cricketer. He made his List A debut for Uttarakhand in the 2018–19 Vijay Hazare Trophy on 20 September 2018. He was the leading wicket-taker for Uttarakhand in the tournament, with eleven dismissals in eight matches.

He made his first-class debut for Uttarakhand in the 2018–19 Ranji Trophy on 1 November 2018, taking a five-wicket haul in the first innings. In December 2018, in the fifth round match against Meghalaya, he took a hat-trick. He was the leading wicket-taker for Uttarakhand in the group-stage of the 2018–19 Ranji Trophy, with 44 dismissals in seven matches. He finished the tournament with 45 wickets in eight matches.

He made his Twenty20 debut for Baroda in the 2018–19 Syed Mushtaq Ali Trophy on 22 February 2019.
