= Lalnunkima Varte =

Indian cricketer (born 1990)

Personal information
- Full name: Lalnunkima Varte
- Born: 12 April 1990 (age 36)
- Batting: Right-handed
- Bowling: Right-arm medium
- Role: Bowler
- Source: ESPNcricinfo, 26 September 2018

Lalnunkima Varte (born 12 April 1990) is an Indian cricketer. He made his List A debut for Mizoram in the 2018–19 Vijay Hazare Trophy on 26 September 2018. He made his first-class debut for Mizoram in the 2018–19 Ranji Trophy on 20 November 2018. He made his Twenty20 debut for Mizoram in the 2018–19 Syed Mushtaq Ali Trophy on 24 February 2019.
