= Tana Davit =

Indian cricketer (born 1995)

Personal information
- Born: 7 September 1995 (age 31)
- Source: Cricinfo, 2 October 2018

Tana Davit (born 7 September 1995) is an Indian cricketer. He made his List A debut for Arunachal Pradesh in the 2018–19 Vijay Hazare Trophy on 2 October 2018. He made his first-class debut for Arunachal Pradesh in the 2018–19 Ranji Trophy on 14 December 2018. He made his Twenty20 debut for Arunachal Pradesh in the 2018–19 Syed Mushtaq Ali Trophy on 24 February 2019.
