= Prashanth Varma =

Indian cricketer (born 1988)

Personal information
- Full name: Prashanth Kerala Varma
- Born: 2 December 1988 (age 37)
- Source: Cricinfo, 20 November 2018

Prashanth Varma (born 2 December 1988) is an Indian cricketer. He made his first-class debut for Puducherry in the 2018–19 Ranji Trophy on 20 November 2018.
