= Licha Tehi =

Indian cricketer (born 1992)

Personal information
- Full name: Licha Tehi
- Born: 8 October 1992 (age 34)
- Batting: Right handed
- Bowling: Right arm medium

Domestic team information
- Years: Team
- 2018–19: Arunachal Pradesh
- Source: ESPNcricinfo, 19 September 2018

Licha Tehi (born 8 October 1992) is an Indian cricketer. He made his List A debut for Arunachal Pradesh in the 2018–19 Vijay Hazare Trophy on 19 September 2018. He made his first-class debut for Arunachal Pradesh in the 2018–19 Ranji Trophy on 1 November 2018. He made his Twenty20 debut for Arunachal Pradesh in the 2018–19 Syed Mushtaq Ali Trophy on 21 February 2019.
