= Paras Sehrawat =

Indian cricketer (born 1997)

Personal information
- Full name: Paras Sehrawat
- Born: 3 December 1997 (age 28); Delhi
- Source: Cricinfo, 19 September 2018

Paras Sehrawat (born 3 December 1997) is an Indian cricketer. He made his List A debut for Nagaland in the 2018–19 Vijay Hazare Trophy on 19 September 2018. He made his first-class debut for Nagaland in the 2018–19 Ranji Trophy on 20 November 2018. He made his Twenty20 debut for Nagaland in the 2018–19 Syed Mushtaq Ali Trophy on 22 February 2019.
