= Gaurav Singh (Mizoram cricketer) =

Indian cricketer (born 1999)

Personal information
- Full name: Gaurav Singh
- Born: 11 May 1999 (age 27)
- Source: ESPNcricinfo, 19 September 2018

Gaurav Singh (born 11 May 1999) is an Indian cricketer. He made his List A debut for Mizoram in the 2018–19 Vijay Hazare Trophy on 19 September 2018.
