= Shelly Shaurya =

Indian cricketer (born 1993)

Personal information
- Born: 17 September 1993 (age 33); Delhi, India
- Batting: Right-handed
- Bowling: Right arm medium

Domestic team information
- Years: Team
- 2018–19: Manipur
- Source: Cricinfo, 11 April 2016

Shelly Shaurya (born 17 September 1993) is an Indian cricketer. He played four Twenty20 cricket matches for Delhi between 2013 and 2014. He made his List A debut for Manipur in the 2018–19 Vijay Hazare Trophy on 6 October 2018. He made his first-class debut for Manipur in the 2018–19 Ranji Trophy on 1 November 2018.

== See also ==
- List of Delhi cricketers
