= Ketan Garg =

Indian cricketer (born 1999)

Personal information
- Full name: Ketan Garg
- Born: 15 June 1999 (age 27); West Delhi, Delhi
- Source: ESPNcricinfo, 22 December 2018

Ketan Garg (born 15 June 1999) is an Indian cricketer. He made his first-class debut for Arunachal Pradesh in the 2018–19 Ranji Trophy on 22 December 2018. As of 2026, Ketan Garg is involved with cricket coaching in London, founding the London Cricket County Academy (LCCA) and working with Fulham Cricket Club.
