= Bobin Singh =

Indian cricketer (born 1981)

Personal information
- Full name: Konthoujam Bobin Singh
- Born: 1 February 1981 (age 45); Imphal, Manipur
- Source: ESPNcricinfo, 22 December 2018

Konthoujam Bobin Singh (born 1 February 1981) is an Indian cricketer. He made his first-class debut for Manipur in the 2018–19 Ranji Trophy on 22 December 2018.
