= Jorhat District Sports Association Ground =

Sports venue in Jorhat, Assam, India

- JDSA Field
- Interactive map of Jorhat District Sports Association Ground
- Full name: Jorhat District Sports Association Ground
- Location: Jorhat
- Coordinates: 26°45′24″N 94°12′24″E
- Owner: Jorhat District Sports Association
- Capacity: 1,000
- Surface: Grass

Construction
- Groundbreaking: 1915
- Opened: 1915
- Renovated: 2008
- Cost: ₹ 6 crore

Jorhat District Sports Association Ground or J.D.S.A. Field is a multi-purposed playground located in Jorhat, Assam. The ground was built in 1915 and has capacity of 1,000 spectators. It is a venue for cricket & football tournaments, fairs & exhibition. In 2008, Jorhat District Sports Association decided to renovate the ground with all the modern facilities like sitting capacity of 25,000 people, construction of a cricket pitch, volleyball court, 400 meters track as well as accommodation building for 100 athletes. The cost of renovation was estimated around 6 crores and was funded by Ministry for Development of North Eastern Region and Jorhat District Administration.
