= Saju Chothan =

Indian cricketer (born 1981)

Personal information
- Full name: Saju Chothan
- Born: 8 November 1981 (age 45)
- Source: Cricinfo, 28 November 2018

Saju Chothan (born 8 November 1981) is an Indian cricketer. He made his first-class debut for Puducherry in the 2018–19 Ranji Trophy on 28 November 2018.
