= Techi Tahin =

Indian cricketer (born 1991)

Personal information
- Full name: Techi Tahin
- Born: 9 June 1991 (age 35); Nyopang, Arunachal Pradesh
- Source: Cricinfo, 12 November 2018

Techi Tahin (born 9 June 1991) is an Indian cricketer. He made his first-class debut for Arunachal Pradesh in the 2018–19 Ranji Trophy on 12 November 2018.
