= Song Tacho =

Indian cricketer (born 1993)

Personal information
- Full name: Song Tacho
- Born: 20 February 1993 (age 33)
- Batting: Right-handed
- Bowling: Right arm medium

Domestic team information
- Years: Team
- 2018–19: Arunachal Pradesh
- Source: Cricinfo, 21 September 2018

Song Tacho (born 20 February 1993) is an Indian cricketer. He made his List A debut for Arunachal Pradesh in the 2018–19 Vijay Hazare Trophy on 21 September 2018. He made his Twenty20 debut for Arunachal Pradesh in the 2018–19 Syed Mushtaq Ali Trophy on 21 February 2019. He is the captain of Arunachal Pradesh for the Vijay Hazare Trophy and Syed Mushtaq Ali Trophy.
