= Karma Bhutia =

Indian cricketer (born 1995)

Personal information
- Full name: Karma Thinlay Bhutia
- Born: 20 June 1995 (age 31); Pakyong, Sikkim
- Source: ESPNcricinfo, 6 December 2018

Karma Bhutia (born 20 June 1995) is an Indian cricketer. He made his first-class debut for Sikkim in the 2018–19 Ranji Trophy on 6 December 2018. He made his Twenty20 debut for Sikkim in the 2018–19 Syed Mushtaq Ali Trophy on 28 February 2019.
