= Vikash Kumar =

Indian cricketer (born 1996)

Personal information
- Born: 1 December 1996 (age 29)
- Source: Cricinfo, 1 March 2021

Vikash Kumar (born 1 December 1996) is an Indian cricketer. He made his List A debut on 1 March 2021, for Mizoram in the 2020–21 Vijay Hazare Trophy. He made his Twenty20 debut on 4 November 2021, for Mizoram in the 2021–22 Syed Mushtaq Ali Trophy. He is right handed batsman. He made his first-class debut on 17 February 2022, for Mizoram in the 2021–22 Ranji Trophy.
