= Dinesh Rai =

Indian cricketer (born 1989)

Personal information
- Full name: Dinesh Kumar Rai
- Born: 21 November 1989 (age 36); Rinchenpong, SIkkim
- Source: ESPNcricinfo, 6 December 2018

Dinesh Rai (born 21 November 1989) is an Indian cricketer. He made his first-class debut for Sikkim in the 2018–19 Ranji Trophy on 6 December 2018. He made his List A debut on 8 October 2019, for Sikkim in the 2019–20 Vijay Hazare Trophy. He made his Twenty20 debut on 9 November 2019, for Sikkim in the 2019–20 Syed Mushtaq Ali Trophy.
