= Sedezhalie Rupero =

Indian cricketer (born 1997)

Personal information
- Full name: Sedezhalie Rupero
- Born: 15 November 1997 (age 28); Dimapur, Nagaland, India
- Source: Cricinfo, 19 September 2018

Sedezhalie Rupero (born 15 November 1997) is an Indian cricketer. He made his List A debut for Nagaland in the 2018–19 Vijay Hazare Trophy on 19 September 2018. He made his first-class debut for Nagaland in the 2018–19 Ranji Trophy on 1 November 2018. He made his Twenty20 debut for Nagaland in the 2018–19 Syed Mushtaq Ali Trophy on 21 February 2019.
