= Hrithik Kanojia =

Indian cricketer (born 1999)

Personal information
- Born: 1999 (age 26–27); Delhi, India
- Source: ESPNcricinfo, 19 September 2018

Hrithik Kanojia (born 1999) is an Indian cricketer. He made his List A debut for Manipur in the 2018–19 Vijay Hazare Trophy on 19 September 2018. He made his first-class debut for Manipur in the 2018–19 Ranji Trophy on 22 December 2018. He made his Twenty20 debut for Manipur in the 2018–19 Syed Mushtaq Ali Trophy on 21 February 2019.
