= Prateek Kataria =

Indian cricketer (born 1995)

Personal information
- Full name: Prateek Singh Kataria
- Born: 16 October 1995 (age 31); Kolkata, West Bengal
- Source: Cricinfo, 6 December 2018

Prateek Kataria (born 16 October 1995) is an Indian cricketer. He made his first-class debut for Arunachal Pradesh in the 2018–19 Ranji Trophy on 6 December 2018. He made his Twenty20 debut for Arunachal Pradesh in the 2018–19 Syed Mushtaq Ali Trophy on 21 February 2019.
