= Indiya Toku =

Indian cricketer (born 1994)

Personal information
- Full name: Indiya Toku
- Born: 29 September 1994 (age 32); Papu, Naharlagun, Arunachal Pradesh
- Source: ESPNcricinfo, 6 December 2018

Indiya Toku (born 29 September 1994) is an Indian cricketer. He made his first-class debut for Arunachal Pradesh in the 2018–19 Ranji Trophy on 6 December 2018. He made his List A debut on 25 February 2021, for Arunachal Pradesh in the 2020–21 Vijay Hazare Trophy. He made his Twenty20 debut on 9 November 2021, for Arunachal Pradesh in the 2021–22 Syed Mushtaq Ali Trophy.
