= Tashi Bhalla =

Indian cricketer (born 1984)

Personal information
- Full name: Tashi Phitso Bhalla
- Born: 30 June 1984 (age 42); Gangtok, Sikkim
- Source: Cricinfo, 7 January 2019

Tashi Bhalla (born 30 June 1984) is an Indian cricketer. He made his first-class debut for Sikkim in the 2018–19 Ranji Trophy on 7 January 2019. Also for Sikkim, he made his Twenty20 and List A debut in the 2018–19 Syed Mushtaq Ali Trophy (on 21 February 2019), and the 2019–20 Vijay Hazare Trophy (1 October 2019), respectively.
