= Sinan Khadir =

Indian cricketer (born 1991)

Personal information
- Born: 3 March 1991 (age 35); Mangalore, Karnataka
- Source: Cricinfo, 19 September 2018

Sinan Khadir (born 3 March 1991) is an Indian cricketer. He made his List A debut for Mizoram in the 2018–19 Vijay Hazare Trophy on 19 September 2018. He made his first-class debut for Mizoram in the 2018–19 Ranji Trophy on 1 November 2018. He was the leading wicket-taker for Mizoram in the tournament, with 22 dismissals in seven matches. He made his Twenty20 debut for Mizoram in the 2018–19 Syed Mushtaq Ali Trophy on 21 February 2019.
