= Pritam Nirala =

Indian cricketer (born 1994)

Personal information
- Born: 23 December 1994 (age 31); Gangtok, Sikkim
- Source: Cricinfo, 28 November 2018

Pritam Nirala (born 23 December 1994) is an Indian cricketer. He made his first-class debut for Sikkim in the 2018–19 Ranji Trophy on 28 November 2018. He made his Twenty20 debut for Sikkim in the 2018–19 Syed Mushtaq Ali Trophy on 2 March 2019.
