= Lalhruai Ralte =

Indian cricketer (born 1992)

Lalhruai Mawia Ralte
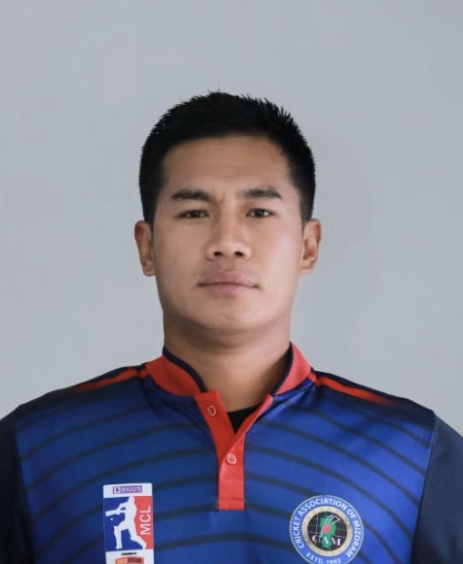
- Lalhruaimawia Ralte

Personal information
- Full name: Lalhruaimawia Ralte
- Born: 10 March 1992 (age 34)
- Batting: Right-handed
- Bowling: Right-arm medium

Domestic team information
- Years: Team
- 2018/19: Mizoram
- Source: ESPNcricinfo, 19 September 2018

Lalhruaimawia Ralte (born 10 March 1992) is an Indian cricketer. He made his List A debut for Mizoram in the 2018–19 Vijay Hazare Trophy on 19 September 2018. He made his first-class debut for Mizoram in the 2018–19 Ranji Trophy on 1 November 2018. He made his Twenty20 debut for Mizoram in the 2018–19 Syed Mushtaq Ali Trophy on 21 February 2019.
