= Homendro Kabrambam =

Indian cricketer (born 1992)

Personal information
- Full name: Homendro Kabrambam Meitei
- Born: 12 October 1992 (age 34); Imphal, Manipur, India
- Source: ESPNcricinfo, 19 September 2018

Homendro Kabrambam Meitei (born 12 October 1992) is an Indian cricketer. He made his List A debut for Manipur in the 2018–19 Vijay Hazare Trophy on 19 September 2018. He made his first-class debut for Manipur in the 2018–19 Ranji Trophy on 20 November 2018. He made his Twenty20 debut for Manipur in the 2018–19 Syed Mushtaq Ali Trophy on 21 February 2019.
