= Abrar Kazi =

Indian cricketer (born 1989)

Personal information
- Full name: Abrar Anjum Kazi
- Born: 29 September 1989 (age 37); Bangalore, Karnataka, India
- Batting: Left-handed
- Bowling: Slow left-arm orthodox

Domestic team information
- Years: Team
- 2011–2019: Karnataka
- 2011: Royal Challengers Bangalore
- Source: ESPNcricinfo, 23 October 2017

Abrar Anjum Kazi (born 29 September 1989) is an Indian cricketer. Ahead of the 2018–19 Ranji Trophy, he transferred from Karnataka to Nagaland. In the opening match of the tournament, against Mizoram, he scored his maiden double century in first-class cricket. He was the leading run-scorer for Nagaland in the tournament, with 814 runs in eight matches. He was also the leading wicket-taker for the team, with 34 dismissals.
