= Myendung Singpho =

Indian cricketer (born 1996)

Personal information
- Full name: Myendung Singpho
- Born: 23 October 1996 (age 30)
- Source: ESPNcricinfo, 19 September 2018

Myendung Singpho (born 23 October 1996) is an Indian cricketer. He made his List A debut for Arunachal Pradesh in the 2018–19 Vijay Hazare Trophy on 19 September 2018. He made his first-class debut for Arunachal Pradesh in the 2018–19 Ranji Trophy on 28 November 2018. He made his Twenty20 debut on 8 November 2019, for Arunachal Pradesh in the 2019–20 Syed Mushtaq Ali Trophy.
