= Ishwar Chaudhary =

Indian cricketer (born 1988)

Personal information
- Born: 10 July 1988 (age 38); Sagthala, Gujarat
- Source: ESPNcricinfo, 22 October 2016

Ishwar Chaudhary (born 10 July 1988) is an Indian cricketer. He made his first-class debut for Gujarat in the 2008–09 Ranji Trophy on 23 November 2008. Ahead of the 2018–19 Ranji Trophy, he transferred from Gujarat to Sikkim. He was the leading wicket-taker for Sikkim in the tournament, with 51 dismissals in eight matches.
