= Vikneshwaran Marimuthu =

Indian cricketer (born 1992)

Personal information
- Full name: Vikneshwaran Marimuthu
- Born: 30 August 1992 (age 34); Nedungadu, Puducherry, India
- Batting: Right handed
- Bowling: Right arm medium fast
- Role: All-rounder
- Source: Cricinfo, 21 September 2018

Vikneshwaran Marimuthu (born 30 August 1992) is an Indian cricketer. He made his List A debut for Puducherry in the 2018–19 Vijay Hazare Trophy on 21 September 2018. He made his first-class debut for Puducherry in the 2018–19 Ranji Trophy on 12 November 2018. He made his Twenty20 debut for Puducherry in the 2018–19 Syed Mushtaq Ali Trophy on 21 February 2019.
