= Tshering Bhutia =

Indian cricketer (born 1995)

Personal information
- Full name: Tshering Wangdi Bhutia
- Born: 27 November 1995 (age 30); Gangtok, Sikkim
- Source: Cricinfo, 30 December 2018

Tshering Bhutia (born 27 November 1995) is an Indian cricketer. He made his first-class debut for Sikkim in the 2018–19 Ranji Trophy on 30 December 2018.
