= Telangana Cricket Association =

Cricket organisation in Hyderabad, India

- Sport: Cricket
- Jurisdiction: Telangana
- Abbreviation: TCA
- Founded: June 2014
- Regional affiliation: South Zone
- Headquarters: Somajiguda, Hyderabad, Telangana
- President: B. B. Patil
- Vice president: K V Reddy
- Secretary: Dharam Guruva Reddy

Official website
- www.tcricket.in

The Telangana Cricket Association is a cricket administration organisation in the Indian state of Telangana. It want to be the governing body of cricket sport in Telangana state. Its headquarters is situated in Somajiguda.

TCA was founded in 2015 after Andhra Pradesh state got bifurcated and Telangana state came into existence. TCA allege that Hyderabad cricket association (HCA) only concentrate on cricket development in Hyderabad city and ignore players from outside the city, from tens of districts. Due to it cricket is underdeveloped in districts and players don not get opportunity to play in Hyderabad cricket team. In 2018 Mumbai High Court gave direction to Board of Control for Cricket in India (BCCI) to consider TCA's application of membership.

== Associate membership status ==
TCA applied for Associate Membership of Board of Control for Cricket in India citing inadequate representation and opportunities for players outside of Hyderabad under the Hyderabad Cricket Association (HCA). On May 4, Bombay High Court directed Committee of Administrators (CoA) of BCCI to hear and decide the plea by TCA before June 15, 2018.

On May 30, 2018, TCA representatives met CoA of BCCI at its headquarters as per their invitation and presented their case on associate membership of TCA.
