= Jalal Uddin (cricketer) =

Indian cricketer (born 1992)

Personal information
- Full name: Jalal Uddin Lashkar
- Born: 23 October 1992 (age 34); Dimapur, Nagaland
- Batting: Right handed
- Bowling: Right arm medium

Domestic team information
- Years: Team
- 2018–19: Nagaland
- Source: ESPNcricinfo, 20 November 2018

Jalal Uddin (born 23 October 1992) is an Indian cricketer. He made his first-class debut for Nagaland in the 2018–19 Ranji Trophy on 20 November 2018.
