= Techi Doria =

Indian cricketer (born 1994)

Personal information
- Born: 2 March 1994 (age 32)
- Batting: Right-handed
- Bowling: Right-arm medium

Domestic team information
- Years: Team
- 2018/19–present: Arunachal Pradesh

Career statistics
Competition	FC	LA	T20
Matches	30	35	36
Runs scored	1,201	489	525
Batting average	21.44	14.81	15.44
100s/50s	0/9	1/1	0/0
Top score	97*	122	43
Balls bowled	1,549	365	236
Wickets	30	7	9
Bowling average	47.83	60.85	37.00
5 wickets in innings	0	0	0
10 wickets in match	0	0	0
Best bowling	4/26	2/49	3/29
Catches/stumpings	11/–	7/–	11/–
- Source: Cricinfo, 12 September 2025

Techi Doria (born 2 March 1994) is an Indian cricketer. He made his List A debut for Arunachal Pradesh in the 2018–19 Vijay Hazare Trophy on 19 September 2018. He made his first-class debut for Arunachal Pradesh in the 2018–19 Ranji Trophy on 1 November 2018. He made his Twenty20 debut for Arunachal Pradesh in the 2018–19 Syed Mushtaq Ali Trophy on 21 February 2019.
