= Nipun Malhotra (cricketer) =

Indian cricketer (born 1993)

Personal information
- Full name: Nipun Malhotra
- Born: 22 September 1993 (age 33); Delhi
- Batting: Right handed
- Bowling: Legbreak googly

Domestic team information
- Years: Team
- 2018–19: Arunachal Pradesh
- Source: ESPNcricinfo, 14 December 2018

Nipun Malhotra (born 22 September 1993) is an Indian cricketer. He made his first-class debut for Arunachal Pradesh in the 2018–19 Ranji Trophy on 14 December 2018.
