= Pawan Suyal =

Indian cricketer (born 1989)

Personal information
- Full name: Pawan Shakland Suyal
- Born: 15 October 1989 (age 37); Pauri, Uttarakhand, India
- Batting: Right-handed
- Bowling: Left-arm fast-medium
- Role: Bowler

Domestic team information
- Years: Team
- 2009/10–2020/21: Delhi
- 2013–2015: Mumbai Indians

Career statistics
Competition	FC	List A	T20
Matches	29	15	22
Runs scored	75	12	–
Batting average	3.75	6.00	–
100s/50s	0/0	0/0	–
Top score	11	11	–
Balls bowled	4747	750	467
Wickets	94	18	15
Bowling average	28.95	31.16	39.73
5 wickets in innings	4	0	0
10 wickets in match	1	0	0
Best bowling	7/108	3/14	2/15
Catches/stumpings	6/–	2/–	1/–
- Source: ESPNcricinfo, 28 December 2019

Pawan Shakland Suyal (born 15 October 1989) is an Indian former cricketer who played for Delhi in domestic cricket. He was a left-arm medium-pace bowler who was a part of Delhi Daredevils squad in the Indian Premier League.

Ahead of the 2018–19 Ranji Trophy, he transferred from Delhi to Nagaland. However, in July 2019, the Nagaland Cricket Association (NCA) released Suyal ahead of the 2019–20 cricket season, following a poor performance in the Syed Mushtaq Ali Trophy.
