= Yashpal Singh (cricketer) =

Indian cricketer (born 1981)

Personal information
- Full name: Yashpal Singh
- Born: November 27, 1981 (age 44); Delhi, India
- Batting: Right-handed
- Role: Middle-order batsman

Domestic team information
- Years: Team
- 2001–2017: Services
- 2009: Kolkata Knight Riders
- 2018–2021: Manipur
- 2021–present: Sikkim
- Source: ESPNcricinfo, 3 May 2025

Yashpal Singh (born 27 November 1981, in Delhi, India) is an Indian cricketer who plays for Sikkim in domestic cricket. After 44 first class games, the right-handed middle order batsman boasted an average of over 60. In the one day format of the game, he had an average of over 50 after 1000 plus runs.

He made his first class debut against Delhi in 2001/02 and made two half centuries against an established bowling lineup consisting of Amit Bhandari, Sarandeep Singh and Rahul Sanghvi. In his next match he scored a double century against Punjab. His innings of 202 included 10 sixes.

He was picked up by the Kochi Tuskers Kerala for 2011 IPL season.

He was the leading run-scorer for Manipur in the 2018–19 Vijay Hazare Trophy, with 488 runs in seven matches. He was also the leading run-scorer for Manipur in the 2018–19 Ranji Trophy, with 860 runs in eight matches.
