= Liyan Khan =

Indian cricketer (born 1991)

Personal information
- Born: 18 November 1991 (age 34); Guwahati, Assam
- Source: ESPNcricinfo, 30 December 2018

Liyan Khan (born 18 November 1991) is an Indian cricketer. He made his first-class debut for Karnataka in the 2018–19 Ranji Trophy on 30 December 2018. He made his Twenty20 debut on 4 November 2021, for Sikkim in the 2021–22 Syed Mushtaq Ali Trophy. He made his List A debut on 8 December 2021, for Sikkim in the 2021–22 Vijay Hazare Trophy.
