= Khawlhring Lalremruata =

Indian cricketer (1987–2026)

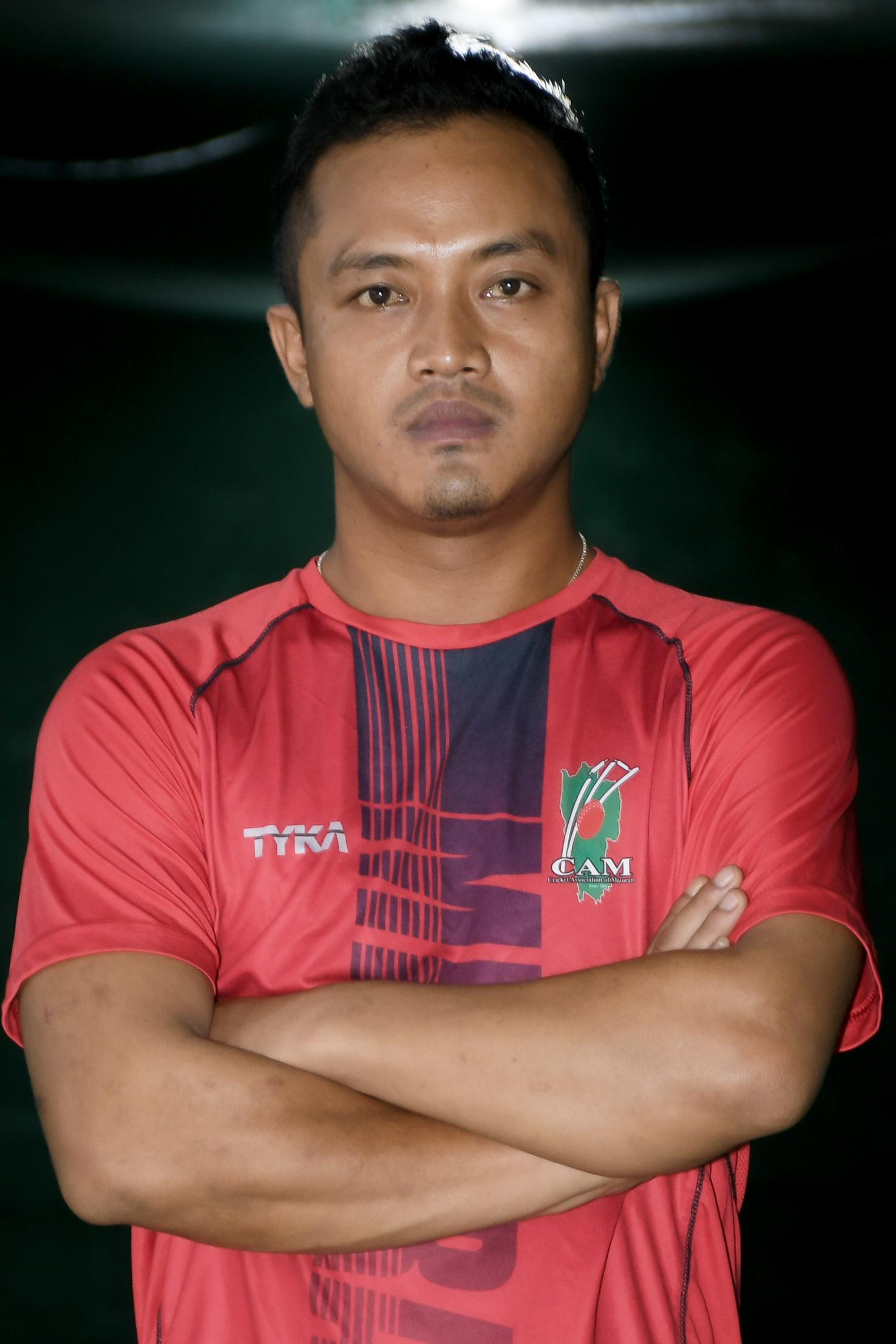

Personal information
- Full name: Khiangte Lalremruata
- Born: 8 March 1987; Upper Republic, Aizawl, Mizoram, India
- Died: 9 January 2026 (aged 38); Aizawl, Mizoram, India
- Batting: Right-handed
- Role: Wicket-keeper
- Source: ESPNcricinfo, 11 March 2022

Khawlhring Lalremruata (9 March 1987 – 8 January 2026) was an Indian cricketer. He made his first-class debut for Mizoram in the 2018–19 Ranji Trophy on 20 December 2018. He made his Twenty20 debut for Mizoram in the 2018–19 Syed Mushtaq Ali Trophy on 21 February 2019.

Lalremruata died from a heart attack at a hospital in Aizawl on 8 January 2026, at the age of 38.
