= Sukumaran Karthik =

Indian cricketer (born 1990)

Personal information
- Born: 5 March 1990 (age 36)
- Batting: Right-handed
- Role: Wicket-keeper batsman

Domestic team information
- Years: Team
- 2018-present: Puducherry
- Source: ESPNcricinfo, 7 November 2019

Sukumaran Karthik (born 5 March 1990) is an Indian cricketer. He made his first-class debut for Puducherry in the 2018–19 Ranji Trophy on 22 December 2018. He had earlier played in the Tamil Nadu Premier League.
