= Rinzing Bhutia =

Indian cricketer (born 1986)

Personal information
- Full name: Rinzing Namgyal Bhutia
- Born: 17 August 1986 (age 40); Mangan, Sikkim
- Source: Cricinfo, 30 December 2018

Rinzing Bhutia (born 17 August 1986) is an Indian cricketer. He made his first-class debut for Sikkim in the 2018–19 Ranji Trophy on 30 December 2018. He made his Twenty20 debut for Sikkim in the 2018–19 Syed Mushtaq Ali Trophy on 28 February 2019.
