= Nagaland cricket team =

Indian cricket team

Personnel
- Captain: Hokaito Zhimomi
- Coach: Kanwaljit Singh
- Owner: Nagaland Cricket Association

Team information
- Founded: 2018
- Home ground: Nagaland Cricket Association Stadium

History
- First-class debut: Mizoram in 2018 at Nagaland Cricket Association Stadium, Sovima
- Ranji Trophy wins: 0
- Vijay Hazare Trophy wins: 0
- Syed Mushtaq Ali Trophy wins: 0
- Official website: nagalandcricket.com

The Nagaland cricket team is a cricket team that represents the state of Nagaland in Indian domestic competitions. In July 2018, the Board of Control for Cricket in India (BCCI) named the team as one of the nine new sides that would compete in domestic tournaments for the 2018–19 season, including the Ranji Trophy and the Vijay Hazare Trophy. However, the Telangana Cricket Association questioned the decision to include the team in the Ranji Trophy, stating that there should be qualification criteria to allow a team to compete. Ahead of the 2018–19 season, Kanwaljit Singh was appointed as the team's coach.

In September 2018, they lost their opening fixture of the 2018–19 Vijay Hazare Trophy, to Bihar, by 8 wickets. In their first season in the Vijay Hazare Trophy, they finished in fourth place in the Plate Group, with five wins and three defeats from their eight matches. KB Pawan finished as the leading run-scorer, with 432 runs, and Imliwati Lemtur was the leading wicket-taker for the team, with ten dismissals.

In November 2018, in their opening match of the 2018–19 Ranji Trophy, they beat Mizoram by an innings and 333 runs. It was the biggest winning margin for a team making its debut in the Ranji Trophy. They finished the 2018–19 tournament seventh in the table, with two wins from their eight matches.

In March 2019, Nagaland finished in last place in Group A of the 2018–19 Syed Mushtaq Ali Trophy, with no wins from their six matches. Rongsen Jonathan was the leading run-scorer for the team in the tournament, with 121 runs, and Pawan Suyal was the leading wicket-taker, with three dismissals.

In July 2019, ahead of the 2019–20 cricket season, the Nagaland Cricket Association (NCA) released three outstation players, Pawan Suyal, K. B. Pawan and Abrar Kazi, following poor performances in the Syed Mushtaq Ali Trophy.

== Famous players ==
India Capped player from other state who played for Nagaland, along with year:

- Stuart Binny (2019–2021)

Prominent players:

- Rongsen Jonathan (2018–present)
- Imliwati Lemtur (2018–present)
- Shrikant Mundhe (2019–2023)

== Squad ==
Name	Birth date	Batting style	Bowling style	Notes
Batsmen
Sedezhalie Rupero	15 November 1997 (age 28)	Right-handed	Right-arm off break	
Hem Chetri	23 September 2000 (age 26)	Left-handed	Right-arm off break	
Joshua Ozukum	4 April 2000 (age 26)	Right-handed	Right-arm medium	
Yugandhar Singh	21 October 2005 (age 21)	Right-handed		
Shamphri Terang	25 October 2000 (age 26)	Left-handed		
Hokaito Zhimomi	24 September 1986 (age 40)	Right-handed	Slow left arm orthodox	Captain
Akamu Sumi	7 February 1996 (age 30)	Right-handed	Right-arm medium	
All-rounders
Rongsen Jonathan	4 October 1986 (age 40)	Right-handed	Right-arm off break	
Nchumbemo Humtsoe	9 September 2000 (age 26)	Left-handed		
Wicket-keeper
Chetan Bist	3 September 1989 (age 37)	Right-handed		
Spin bowlers
Imliwati Lemtur	25 December 1991 (age 34)	Left-handed	Slow left arm orthodox	
Akavi Yeptho	2 September 1997 (age 29)	Left-handed	Right-arm off break	
Saurav Kumar	1 March 2002 (age 24)	Right-handed	Right-arm medium bowler	
Neizekho Rupreo	3 October 2006 (age 20)	Left-handed	Slow left arm orthodox	
Pace bowlers
Ronit More	2 February 1992 (age 34)	Right-handed	Right-arm medium	
Dip Borah	15 February 2004 (age 22)	Right-handed	Right-arm medium	
Nagaho Chishi	12 November 1997 (age 28)	Right-handed	Right-arm medium	
Anil Gupta	1 March 2005 (age 21)	Right-handed	Right-arm medium	
Chopise Hopongkyu	20 December 2000 (age 25)	Right-handed	Right-arm medium	

Updated as on 2 November 2026

== See also ==
- List of Nagaland cricketers
