= Pondicherry cricket team =

Indian cricket team

Personnel
- Captain: Neyan Kangayan (FC); Aman Hakim Khan (LA); Aman Hakim Khan (T20)
- Coach: Dishant Yagnik
- Owner: Cricket Association of Pondicherry

Team information
- Founded: 2018
- Home ground: Cricket Association Pondicherry Siechem Ground

History
- First-class debut: Meghalaya in 2018 at Cricket Association Pondicherry Siechem Ground, Puducherry
- Ranji Trophy wins: 0
- Vijay Hazare Trophy wins: 0
- Syed Mushtaq Ali Trophy wins: 0
- Official website: CAP

The Pondicherry cricket team (also Puducherry cricket team) is a cricket team that represents the union territory of Puducherry in Indian domestic competitions. In July 2018, the Board of Control for Cricket in India (BCCI) named the team as one of the nine new sides that would compete in domestic tournaments for the 2018–19 season, including the Ranji Trophy and the Vijay Hazare Trophy.

In August 2018, Abhishek Nayar, who previously played for Mumbai, decided to join the team. In September 2018, they won their opening fixture of the 2018–19 Vijay Hazare Trophy, beating Manipur by 8 wickets. However, the next day, the BCCI revoked the team's allowance around players from outside the state the team is located in, after concerns were raised that no local cricketers had played in the match. Eight players were found to be outside the BCCI's eligibility criteria.

In their first season in the Vijay Hazare Trophy, they finished in third place in the Plate Group, with five wins and two defeats from their eight matches. The other two matches finished as no results. Paras Dogra finished as the leading run-scorer, with 257 runs, and Fabid Ahmed was the leading wicket-taker for the team, with eleven dismissals.

In November 2018, they played in their first match in the Ranji Trophy, against Meghalaya, in the 2018–19 tournament. In their opening match in the tournament, Paras Dogra became the first batsman for Pondicherry to score a century in the Ranji Trophy. The match was affected by rain and finished in a draw. They finished the 2018–19 tournament third in the table, with four wins from their eight matches.

In March 2019, Pondicherry finished seventh in Group E of the 2018–19 Syed Mushtaq Ali Trophy, with one win from their seven matches. Paras Dogra was the leading run-scorer for the team in the tournament, with 255 runs, and Parandaman Thamaraikannan was the leading wicket-taker, with seven dismissals.

== Famous Players ==
India Capped players from other states who played for Pondicherry, along with year:

- Pankaj Singh (2018-2021)
- Abhishek Nayar (2018)
- Vinay Kumar (2019-2020)
- Jayant Yadav (2025-present)

Prominent players without international cap

- Sagar Udeshi (2018-present)
- Paras Dogra (2018-2024)

== Squad ==
Name	Birth date	Batting style	Bowling style	Notes
Batsmen
Neyan Kangayan	17 May 2003 (age 23)	Right-handed	Right-arm leg break	First-class Captain
Mohit Kale	27 November 1996 (age 29)	Right-handed	Right-arm leg break	
Jashwanth Shreeram	17 November 2004 (age 22)	Right-handed		
Vikneshwaran Marimuthu	30 August 1992 (age 34)	Right-handed	Right-arm medium	
Parameeswaran Sivaraman	21 February 2000 (age 26)	Right-handed	Right-arm medium	
Nikhil Gangta	1 September 1992 (age 34)	Right-handed	Right-arm medium	
Ritesh Gudge	4 June 1986 (age 40)	Right-handed		
All-rounders
Aman Hakim Khan	23 November 1996 (age 29)	Right-handed	Right-arm medium	List A and Twenty20 Captain; Plays for Chennai Super Kings in IPL
Pugazhendi Akash	28 November 2003 (age 22)	Left-handed	Right-arm off break	
R Ragavan	21 January 2006 (age 20)	Left-handed	Right-arm off break	
Ankit Sharma	20 April 1991 (age 35)	Left-handed	Slow left-arm orthodox	
Shashank Singh	21 November 1991 (age 34)	Right-handed	Right-arm medium-fast	Plays for Punjab Kings in IPL
Wicket-keepers
Ajay Rohera	4 June 1997 (age 29)	Right-handed		
Bhanu Anand	4 November 1998 (age 28)	Right-handed		
Prasad Pawar	31 January 1995 (age 31)	Right-handed		
Spin bowlers
Sagar Udeshi	14 October 1986 (age 40)	Left-handed	Slow left-arm orthodox	
Sidak Singh	17 May 1999 (age 27)	Left-handed	Slow left-arm orthodox	
Karan Kannan	11 November 2001 (age 25)	Right-handed	Right-arm off break	
Raghav Goyal	20 June 2001 (age 25)	Left-handed	Slow left-arm unorthodox	
Badal Rawat	10 January 2009 (age 17)	Right-handed	Slow left-arm orthodox	
Pace bowlers
Gaurav Yadav	31 October 1991 (age 35)	Right-handed	Right-arm medium	
Parth Vaghani	30 November 1994 (age 31)	Right-handed	Left-arm medium	
Adil Ayub Tunda	10 July 2002 (age 24)	Right-handed	Right-arm medium	
Vijai Raja	11 January 1999 (age 27)	Left-handed	Left-arm medium	
Sagar Trivedi	20 October 1991 (age 35)	Left-handed	Left-arm medium	

Updated as on 14 November 2026

== Coaching staff ==
- Head coach - Dishant Yagnik
- Bowling coach - Shaun Tait
- Manager and strength and conditioning coach - Kalpendra Jha
