= Mizoram cricket team =

Indian cricket team

Personnel
- Captain: Joseph Lalthankhuma
- Coach: Mohammad Saif
- Owner: Cricket Association of Mizoram

Team information
- Founded: 2018

History
- First-class debut: Nagaland in 2018 at Nagaland Cricket Association Stadium, Sovima
- Ranji Trophy wins: 0
- Vijay Hazare Trophy wins: 0
- Syed Mushtaq Ali Trophy wins: 0

The Mizoram cricket team represents the state of Mizoram in Indian domestic cricket competitions. In July 2018, the Board of Control for Cricket in India (BCCI) named the team as one of the nine new sides that would compete in domestic tournaments for the 2018–19 season, including the Ranji Trophy and the Vijay Hazare Trophy. However, the Telangana Cricket Association questioned the decision to include the team in the Ranji Trophy, stating that there should be qualification criteria to allow a team to compete.

In September 2018, they lost their opening fixture of the 2018–19 Vijay Hazare Trophy, to Arunachal Pradesh, by 4 wickets. In their first season in the Vijay Hazare Trophy, they finished in eighth place in the Plate Group, with one win and six defeats from their eight matches. One match also finished as a no result. Taruwar Kohli finished both as the leading run-scorer, with 373 runs, and the leading wicket-taker for the team, with eight dismissals.

In November 2018, in their opening match of the 2018–19 Ranji Trophy, they lost to Nagaland by an innings and 333 runs. It was the biggest defeat for a team making its debut in the Ranji Trophy. They finished the 2018–19 tournament in the ninth and last place in the table, with no wins from their eight matches.

In March 2019, Mizoram finished in last place in Group D of the 2018–19 Syed Mushtaq Ali Trophy, with no wins from their seven matches. Taruwar Kohli was the leading run-scorer for the team in the tournament, with 222 runs, and Sinan Khadir was the leading wicket-taker, with seven dismissals.

== Notable Players ==
- Taruwar Kohli (2018-2023)

== Squad ==
Name	Birth date	Batting style	Bowling style	Notes
Batsmen
Joseph Lalthankhuma	26 September 2000 (age 26)	Right-handed	Right-arm off break	Captain
Sahil Reza	11 September 2001 (age 25)	Right-handed	Right-arm medium	
Lalhruaizela	30 December 1996 (age 29)	Right-handed		
F Lalmuanzuala	20 August 1998 (age 28)	Right-handed	Right-arm off break	
Sahil Sharma	17 December 2002 (age 23)	Left-handed	Right-arm off break	
Lalroluahpuia Ngente	3 July 1997 (age 29)	Right-handed	Right-arm off break	
Johan Lalbiakkima	22 October 2006 (age 19)	Right-handed	Right-arm off break	
Vikash Kumar	1 December 1996 (age 29)	Right-handed		
Zothanzuala	5 December 1999 (age 26)	Right-handed	Right-arm off break	
Chinmay Sutar	3 May 1997 (age 29)	Right-handed	Right-arm leg break	
Naseb Rai	4 September 2002 (age 24)	Right-handed	Right-arm medium	
All-rounders
B Lalnunfela	7 April 2002 (age 24)	Right-handed	Right-arm off break	
Lalhriatrenga	28 December 1999 (age 26)	Right-handed	Right-arm medium	
Wicket-keeper
Jehu Anderson	12 November 1999 (age 26)	Right-handed		
Manender Singh	2 January 1996 (age 30)	Right-handed		
Spin bowlers
Lalrempuia	15 January 1993 (age 33)	Right-handed	Right-arm off break	
Bobby Zothansanga	25 August 1986 (age 40)	Right-handed	Right-arm off break	
TC Vanlalremruata	7 July 2000 (age 26)	Right-handed	Slow left-arm orthodox	
Pace bowlers
Khiangte Vanrotlinga	6 December 2004 (age 21)	Left-handed	Right-arm medium	
CA Karthik	8 October 1993 (age 33)	Right-handed	Right-arm medium	
Sumit Lama	26 February 1996 (age 30)	Right-handed	Right-arm medium	
Naveen Gurung	5 March 2002 (age 24)	Right-handed	Left-arm medium	
Kuldip Yadav	15 October 1996 (age 30)	Left-handed	Left-arm medium	Plays for Chennai Super Kings in IPL
Remruatdika Ralte	6 August 1998 (age 28)	Right-handed	Right-arm medium	

Updated as on 18 October 2026
