= 2018–19 Syed Mushtaq Ali Trophy Group D =

Cricket tournament

- Dates: 21 February – 2 March 2019
- Administrator(s): BCCI
- Cricket format: Twenty20 cricket
- Tournament format(s): Round-robin and Playoff format
- Participants: 8

The 2018–19 Syed Mushtaq Ali Trophy was the tenth season of the Syed Mushtaq Ali Trophy, a Twenty20 cricket tournament in India. It was contested by the 37 domestic cricket teams of India, with seven teams in Group D. The group stage started on 21 February 2019, with the top two teams progressing to the Super League section of the competition.

Karnataka won the group, with Bengal finishing second to progress to the Super League phase of the tournament.

== Points table ==
Team	Pld	W	L	T	NR	Pts	NRR
Karnataka	7	7	0	0	0	28	+2.959
Bengal	7	5	2	0	0	20	+2.259
Chhattisgarh	7	4	3	0	0	16	+1.539
Assam	7	4	3	0	0	16	+1.400
Haryana	7	4	3	0	0	16	+0.881
Odisha (H)	7	3	4	0	0	12	–0.157
Arunachal Pradesh	7	1	6	0	0	4	–3.885
Mizoram	7	0	7	0	0	0	–5.371

- Top two teams advances to the Super League.

(H)- Host

== Fixtures ==
=== Round 1 ===
21 February 2019
Scorecard

Karnataka; 169/6 (20 overs)	v	Assam; 154/7 (20 overs)
Manish Pandey 74 (39); Abu Nechim 2/32 (4 overs)		Wasiqur Rahman 62 (41); Vinay Kumar 2/22 (3 overs)

Karnataka won by 15 runs
DRIEMS Ground, Cuttack
Umpires: Amiesh Saheba and Rajeev Godara

- Assam won the toss and elected to field.
- Jitumoni Kalita, Mukhtar Hussain (Assam), Rohan Kadam, Krishnamurthy Siddharth and Manoj Bhandage (Karnataka) all made their T20 debuts.

21 February 2019
Scorecard

Odisha; 137 (19.4 overs)	v	Chhattisgarh; 138/0 (16.1 overs)
Subhranshu Senapati 51 (37); Aishwarya Mourya 3/20 (4 overs)		Rishabh Tiwari 71* (55)

Chhattisgarh won by 10 wickets
Barabati Stadium, Cuttack
Umpires: Sudhir Asnani and Madanagopal Kuppuraj

- Chhattisgarh won the toss and elected to field.
- Aishwarya Mourya, Lavin Coster (Chhattisgarh), Sarbeswar Mohanty, Rajesh Mohanty and Pappu Roy (Odisha) all made their T20 debuts.

21 February 2019
Scorecard

Arunachal Pradesh; 106/6 (20 overs)	v	Haryana; 110/2 (15.1 overs)
Kshitiz Sharma 48* (32); Sumit Kumar 3/13 (4 overs)		Chaitanya Bishnoi 60* (43); Subhash Sharma 1/26 (3.1 overs)

Haryana won by 8 wickets
DRIEMS Ground, Cuttack
Umpires: Amiesh Saheba and Rajeev Godara

- Haryana won the toss and elected to field.
- Treyaksh Bali, Arun Chaprana, Sumit Kumar (Haryana), Samarth Seth, Techi Doria, Neelam Obi, Song Tacho, Kamsha Yangfo, Robin Toko, Licha Tehi, Prateek Kataria and Subhash Sharma (Arunachal Pradesh) all made their T20 debuts.

21 February 2019
Scorecard

Bengal; 221/4 (20 overs)	v	Mizoram; 62 (13 overs)
Abhimanyu Easwaran 107* (56); Taruwar Kohli 2/49 (4 overs)		K Vanlalruata 17 (15); Prayas Ray Barman 4/14 (3 overs)

Bengal won by 159 runs
Barabati Stadium, Cuttack
Umpires: Sudhir Asnani and Madanagopal Kuppuraj

- Mizoram won the toss and elected to field.
- Prayas Ray Barman (Bengal), G Lalbiakvela, K Lalhmingmawia, Lalhruai Ralte, Saidingliana Sailo, K Vanlalruata, Sinan Khadir, Lalhruaizela, Khawlhring Lalremruata, Parvez Ahmed and Akhil Rajput (Mizoram) all made their T20 debuts.

=== Round 2 ===
22 February 2019
Scorecard

Assam; 197/4 (20 overs)	v	Mizoram; 70/6 (20 overs)
Riyan Parag 63* (39); Parvez Ahmed 1/24 (4 overs)		Lalhruaizela 24* (55); Jitumoni Kalita 2/8 (4 overs)

Assam won by 131 runs
Barabati Stadium, Cuttack
Umpires: Rajeev Godara and Madanagopal Kuppuraj

- Mizoram won the toss and elected to field.

22 February 2019
Scorecard

Chhattisgarh; 215/3 (20 overs)	v	Arunachal Pradesh; 118/8 (20 overs)
Rishabh Tiwari 81 (52); Kshitiz Sharma 1/25 (4 overs)		Samarth Seth 34 (40); Vishal Kushwah 4/16 (4 overs)

Chhattisgarh won by 97 runs
DRIEMS Ground, Cuttack
Umpires: Amiesh Saheba and Sudhir Asnani

- Arunachal Pradesh won the toss and elected to field.

22 February 2019
Scorecard

Haryana; 141 (19.5 overs)	v	Odisha; 131/5 (20 overs)
Himanshu Rana 25 (20); Pappu Roy 3/9 (4 overs)		Biplab Samantray 48 (28); Ajit Chahal 2/27 (4 overs)

Haryana won by 10 runs
Barabati Stadium, Cuttack
Umpires: Rajeev Godara and Madanagopal Kuppuraj

- Odisha won the toss and elected to field.

22 February 2019
Scorecard

Bengal; 131 (19.4 overs)	v	Karnataka; 134/1 (15.5 overs)
Shreevats Goswami 40 (29); Abhimanyu Mithun 3/22 (4 overs)		Rohan Kadam 81* (55); Pradipta Pramanik 1/28 (3 overs)

Karnataka won by 9 wickets
DRIEMS Ground, Cuttack
Umpires: Amiesh Saheba and Sudhir Asnani

- Bengal won the toss and elected to bat.

=== Round 3 ===
24 February 2019
Scorecard

Chhattisgarh; 194/2 (20 overs)	v	Assam; 195/5 (20 overs)
Harpreet Singh 92* (54); Mukhtar Hussain 1/26 (4 overs)		Amit Sinha 77* (55); Pankaj Rao 2/34 (4 overs)

Assam won by 5 wickets
DRIEMS Ground, Cuttack
Umpires: Amiesh Saheba and Rajeev Godara

- Assam won the toss and elected to field.

24 February 2019
Scorecard

Haryana; 141/8 (20 overs)	v	Bengal; 145/7 (19 overs)
Himanshu Rana 60 (55); Ishan Porel 3/28 (4 overs)		Vivek Singh 32 (34); Ashish Hooda 2/22 (3 overs)

Bengal won by 3 wickets
Barabati Stadium, Cuttack
Umpires: Sudhir Asnani and Madanagopal Kuppuraj

- Bengal won the toss and elected to field.
- Shahbaz Ahmed and Ishan Porel (Bengal) both made their T20 debuts.

24 February 2019
Scorecard

Mizoram; 91 (19.1 overs)	v	Odisha; 95/1 (12.5 overs)
Taruwar Kohli 37 (38); Pappu Roy 3/8 (4 overs)		Sandeep Pattnaik 54* (39); Sinan Khadir 1/22 (4 overs)

Odisha won by 9 wickets
DRIEMS Ground, Cuttack
Umpires: Amiesh Saheba and Rajeev Godara

- Mizoram won the toss and elected to bat.
- Swastik Samal (Odisha), Lalrempuia and Lalnunkima Varte (Mizoram) all made their T20 debuts.

24 February 2019
Scorecard

Karnataka; 226/4 (20 overs)	v	Arunachal Pradesh; 80 (14.4 overs)
Manish Pandey 111* (46); Akhilesh Sahani 2/39 (4 overs)		Samarth Seth 49 (35); Shreyas Gopal 5/11 (3.4 overs)

Karnataka won by 146 runs
Barabati Stadium, Cuttack
Umpires: Sudhir Asnani and Madanagopal Kuppuraj

- Karnataka won the toss and elected to bat.
- Vasuki Koushik (Karnataka), Sams Alam, Suheh Hussain, Tana Davit and Akhilesh Sahani (Arunachal Pradesh) all made their T20 debuts.

=== Round 4 ===
25 February 2019
Scorecard

Assam; 162/5 (20 overs)	v	Bengal; 136/9 (20 overs)
Sibsankar Roy 83 (53); Ashok Dinda 4/17 (4 overs)		Shreevats Goswami 43 (40); Abu Nechim 2/25 (4 overs)

Assam won by 26 runs
Barabati Stadium, Cuttack
Umpires: Amiesh Saheba and Rajeev Godara

- Bengal won the toss and elected to field.

25 February 2019
Scorecard

Haryana; 210/5 (20 overs)	v	Chhattisgarh; 211/5 (20 overs)
Chaitanya Bishnoi 65* (44); Shakeeb Ahmed 2/38 (4 overs)		Rishabh Tiwari 62 (32); Sumit Kumar 1/28 (3 overs)

Chhattisgarh won by 5 wickets
DRIEMS Ground, Cuttack
Umpires: Sudhir Asnani and Subrat Das

- Haryana won the toss and elected to bat.
- Shubham Singh (Chhattisgarh) made his T20 debut.

25 February 2019
Scorecard

Karnataka; 242/4 (20 overs)	v	Mizoram; 105/6 (20 overs)
Rohan Kadam 78 (51); Lalhruai Ralte 2/48 (4 overs)		Akhil Rajput 41 (42); Shreyas Gopal 4/8 (4 overs)

Karnataka won by 137 runs
DRIEMS Ground, Cuttack
Umpires: Subrat Das

- Karnataka won the toss and elected to bat.
- Luvnith Sisodia (Karnataka) made his T20 debut.

25 February 2019
Scorecard

Arunachal Pradesh; 75 (19.4 overs)	v	Odisha; 76/2 (13.1 overs)
Techi Doria 26 (37); Debabrata Pradhan 3/10 (3.4 overs)		Abhishek Raut 41* (43); Akhilesh Sahani 2/21 (3.1 overs)

Odisha won by 8 wickets
Barabati Stadium, Cuttack
Umpires: Amiesh Saheba and Rajeev Godara

- Arunachal Pradesh won the toss and elected to bat.

=== Round 5 ===
27 February 2019
Scorecard

Assam; 142/9 (20 overs)	v	Odisha; 143/3 (16.5 overs)
Sibsankar Roy 47 (32); Pappu Roy 4/21 (4 overs)		Biplab Samantray 43* (36); Abu Nechim 2/29 (3 overs)

Odisha won by 7 wickets
DRIEMS Ground, Cuttack
Umpires: Amiesh Saheba and Sudhir Asnani

- Odisha won the toss and elected to field.

27 February 2019
Scorecard

Chhattisgarh; 171/3 (20 overs)	v	Karnataka; 175/6 (19.2 overs)
Harpreet Singh 79 (56); Shreyas Gopal 1/19 (2 overs)		Karun Nair 35 (28); Aishwarya Mourya 2/13 (2 overs)

Karnataka won by 4 wickets
Barabati Stadium, Cuttack
Umpires: Rajeev Godara and Subrat Das

- Chhattisgarh won the toss and elected to bat.

27 February 2019
Scorecard

Haryana; 205/2 (20 overs)	v	Mizoram; 166/5 (20 overs)
Guntashveer Singh 100* (54); Lalnunkima Varte 2/30 (4 overs)		Taruwar Kohli 63 (49); Rahul Tewatia 2/18 (4 overs)

Haryana won by 39 runs
DRIEMS Ground, Cuttack
Umpires: Amiesh Saheba and Sudhir Asnani

- Haryana won the toss and elected to bat.
- Lalhmangaiha, Darremsanga, Andrew Vanlalhruaia and Bobby Zothansanga (Mizoram) all made their T20 debuts.

27 February 2019
Scorecard

Bengal; 234/6 (20 overs)	v	Arunachal Pradesh; 127/4 (20 overs)
Wriddhiman Saha 129 (62); Akhilesh Sahani 3/36 (4 overs)		Kshitiz Sharma 54* (39); Sayan Ghosh 1/23 (4 overs)

Bengal won by 107 runs
Barabati Stadium, Cuttack
Umpires: Rajeev Godara and Subrat Das

- Bengal won the toss and elected to bat.
- Ayan Bhattacharjee (Bengal), Madhav Avsh and Ankit Singh (Arunachal Pradesh) all made their T20 debuts.

=== Round 6 ===
28 February 2019
Scorecard

Bengal; 188/4 (20 overs)	v	Chhattisgarh; 162/9 (20 overs)
Abhimanyu Easwaran 59 (41); Shivendra Singh 2/28 (4 overs)		Harpreet Singh 54 (36); Sayan Ghosh 4/32 (4 overs)

Bengal won by 26 runs
DRIEMS Ground, Cuttack
Umpires: Sudhir Asnani and Subrat Das

- Chhattisgarh won the toss and elected to field.

28 February 2019
Scorecard

Assam; 80/9 (20 overs)	v	Haryana; 81/3 (8.4 overs)
Pallavkumar Das 22 (22); Sumit Kumar 4/20 (3 overs)		Yashu Sharma 26 (16); Pritam Das 1/8 (2 overs)

Haryana won by 7 wickets
Barabati Stadium, Cuttack
Umpires: Amiesh Saheba and Rajeev Godara

- Haryana won the toss and elected to field.
- Yashu Sharma (Haryana) made his T20 debut.

28 February 2019
Scorecard

Karnataka; 155/9 (20 overs)	v	Odisha; 104 (18.1 overs)
Rohan Kadam 89 (59); Biplab Samantray 2/10 (2 overs)		Suryakant Pradhan 32 (17); K. C. Cariappa 4/15 (4 overs)

Karnataka won by 51 runs
Barabati Stadium, Cuttack
Umpires: Amiesh Saheba and Rajeev Godara

- Odisha won the toss and elected to field.

28 February 2019
Scorecard

Mizoram; 122/8 (20 overs)	v	Arunachal Pradesh; 125/2 (11.4 overs)
Taruwar Kohli 52 (32); Akhilesh Sahani 4/35 (4 overs)		Samarth Seth 66* (35); Sinan Khadir 2/37 (3.4 overs)

Arunachal won by 8 wickets
DRIEMS Ground, Cuttack
Umpires: Sudhir Asnani and Subrat Das

- Mizoram won the toss and elected to bat.
- Deendyal Upadhyay (Arunachal Pradesh) made his T20 debut.

=== Round 7 ===
2 March 2019
Scorecard

Arunachal Pradesh; 102 (18 overs)	v	Assam; 104/1 (6.4 overs)
Samarth Seth 42 (32); Mukhtar Hussain 4/8 (3 overs)		Rishav Das 39 (18); Somnath Soni 1/15 (1 over)

Assam won by 9 wickets
DRIEMS Ground, Cuttack
Umpires: Rajeev Godara and Subrat Das

- Arunachal Pradesh won the toss and elected to bat.
- Hrishikesh Tamuli (Assam) and Somnath Soni (Arunachal Pradesh) both made their T20 debuts.

2 March 2019
Scorecard

Chhattisgarh; 220/5 (20 overs)	v	Mizoram; 104/5 (20 overs)
Rishabh Tiwari 85 (46); Bobby Zothansanga 2/35 (3 overs)		Akhil Rajput 40 (56); Pawandeep Singh 2/8 (3 overs)

Chhattisgarh won by 116 runs
Barabati Stadium, Cuttack
Umpires: Amiesh Saheba and Sudhir Asnani

- Mizoram won the toss and elected to field.
- Pawandeep Singh (Chhattisgarh) made his T20 debut.

2 March 2019
Scorecard

Karnataka; 138/9 (20 overs)	v	Haryana; 124 (19.1 overs)
Rohan Kadam 25 (21); Amit Mishra 3/26 (4 overs)		Sumit Kumar 63 (40); Shreyas Gopal 3/16 (2 overs)

Karnataka won by 14 runs
DRIEMS Ground, Cuttack
Umpires: Rajeev Godara and Subrat Das

- Haryana won the toss and elected to field.
- Ankit Kumar (Haryana) made his T20 debut.

2 March 2019
Scorecard

Odisha; 108/9 (20 overs)	v	Bengal; 111/2 (12.4 overs)
Rajesh Mohanty 24 (21); Ishan Porel 3/19 (4 overs)		Wriddhiman Saha 52 (31); Subham Nayak 1/18 (3 overs)

Bengal won by 8 wickets
Barabati Stadium, Cuttack
Umpires: Amiesh Saheba and Sudhir Asnani

- Odisha won the toss and elected to bat.
- Shantanu Mishra, Subham Nayak and Ashutosh Das (Odisha) all made their T20 debuts.
