= 2018–19 Vijay Hazare Trophy Group C =

Cricket tournament

- Dates: 19 September – 10 October 2018
- Administrator: BCCI
- Cricket format: List A cricket
- Tournament format(s): Round-robin and Playoff format
- Participants: 10

The 2018–19 Vijay Hazare Trophy was the 17th season of the Vijay Hazare Trophy, a List A cricket tournament in India. It was contested by the 37 domestic cricket teams of India, with ten teams in Group C. The group stage started on 19 September 2018, with the top two teams from Group C progressing to the quarter-finals of the competition.

In the Round 2 fixture between Rajasthan and Jharkhand, Jharkhand's Shahbaz Nadeem set a new List A cricket record, taking eight wickets for ten runs from ten overs.

Haryana and Jharkhand both progressed from Group C to the knock-out phase of the tournament.

== Points table ==
Pos	Team	Pld	W	L	T	NR	Pts	NRR
1	Jharkhand	9	7	0	0	2	32	1.347
2	Haryana	9	6	1	0	2	28	1.661
3	Services	9	5	3	0	1	22	0.597
4	Gujarat	9	5	3	0	1	22	0.534
5	Tamil Nadu	9	5	4	0	0	20	0.767
6	Bengal	9	4	4	0	1	18	−0.115
7	Jammu & Kashmir	9	3	6	0	0	12	−0.855
8	Tripura	9	2	6	0	1	10	−0.580
9	Rajasthan	9	2	7	0	0	8	−0.971
10	Assam	9	1	6	0	2	8	−2.005

- Top two teams advances to the knockout stage and are promoted to the Elite Group A and B.
- Bottom ranked team is relegated to the Plate Group for the next season.

== Fixtures ==
=== Round 1 ===
19 September 2018
9:00
Scorecard

Assam	v	Gujarat

Match abandoned
TI Cycles Ground, Chennai

- No toss.

19 September 2018
9:00
Scorecard

Tripura; 118 (38.4 overs)	v	Services; 108/3 (25.2 overs)
Bishal Ghosh 21 (34); Diwesh Pathania 3/28 (9 overs)		Rahul Singh 48 (58); Rana Dutta 2/29 (7 overs)

Services won by 7 wickets (VJD method)
M. A. Chidambaram Stadium, Chennai
Umpires: Sai Darshan Kumar and Subrat Das

- Services won the toss and elected to field.
- Abhishek Tiwari, Varun Choudhary, Nitin Tanwar, Arjun Sharma (Services) and Bikramjit Debnath (Tripura) all made their List A debuts.

19 September 2018
9:00
Scorecard

Haryana	v	Jharkhand

Match abandoned
India Cement Limited Guru Nanak College Ground, Chennai

- No toss.

=== Round 2 ===
20 September 2018
9:00
Scorecard

Jammu & Kashmir; 96 (23.4 overs)	v	Bengal; 98/4 (20.4 overs)
Paras Sharma 17 (33); Prayas Ray Barman 4/20 (5 overs)		Shreevats Goswami 22 (45); Shubham Khajuria 1/3 (1 over)

Bengal won by 6 wickets
Sri Sivasubramaniya Nadar College of Engineering Ground, Chennai
Umpires: Jayaraman Madanagopal and Rajesh Timaney

- Bengal won the toss and elected to field.
- The match was reduced to 25 overs per side due to rain.
- Sahabaz Ahmed and Prayas Ray Barman (Bengal) both made their List A debuts.

20 September 2018
9:00
Scorecard

Rajasthan; 73 (28.3 overs)	v	Jharkhand; 76/3 (14.3 overs)
Ankit Lamba 20 (37); Shahbaz Nadeem 8/10 (10 overs)		Anand Singh 22 (29); Mahipal Lomror 2/22 (5 overs)

Jharkhand won by 7 wickets
TI Cycles Ground, Chennai
Umpires: Nitin Pandit and Sadashiv Iyer

- Rajasthan won the toss and elected to bat.

20 September 2018
9:00
Scorecard

Tamil Nadu; 205/8 (49 overs)	v	Gujarat; 210/6 (47.1 overs)
Baba Indrajith 58 (59); Piyush Chawla 3/38 (10 overs)		Priyank Panchal 117* (129); Ravisrinivasan Sai Kishore 2/37 (10 overs)

Gujarat won by 4 wickets
MA Chidambaram Stadium, Chennai
Umpires: K. N. Ananthapadmanabhan and Subrat Das

- Tamil Nadu won the toss and elected to bat.
- Varun Chakravarthy and T. Natarajan (Tamil Nadu) both made their List A debuts.

=== Round 3 ===
21 September 2018
9:00
Scorecard

Jammu & Kashmir; 79 (30 overs)	v	Tripura; 81/6 (30.5 overs)
Ahmed Bandy 24 (41); Harmeet Singh 5/10 (7 overs)		Nirupam Sen Chowdhary 24 (67); Shubham Khajuria 1/1 (1 over)

Tripura won by 4 wickets
Sri Sivasubramaniya Nadar College of Engineering Ground, Chennai
Umpires: Jayaraman Madanagopal and Rajesh Timaney

- Jammu & Kashmir won the toss and elected to bat.
- The match was reduced to 35 overs per side due to rain.

21 September 2018
9:00
Scorecard

Assam; 81 (30.2 overs)	v	Haryana; 83/2 (11.2 overs)
Riyan Parag 24 (35); Amit Mishra 6/13 (10 overs)		Harshal Patel 37 (21); Amit Sinha 1/4 (0.2 overs)

Haryana won by 8 wickets
MA Chidambaram Stadium, Chennai
Umpires: Sai Darshan Kumar and Subrat Das

- Assam won the toss and elected to bat.
- Arun Chaprana (Haryana) made his List A debut.

21 September 2018
9:00
Scorecard

Tamil Nadu; 315/4 (50 overs)	v	Services; 232 (46 overs)
Narayan Jagadeesan 133 (130); Varun Choudhary 3/63 (9 overs)		Nakul Verma 60 (55); Varun Chakravarthy 5/38 (10 overs)

Tamil Nadu won by 83 runs
Indian Institute of Technology Chemplast Ground, Chennai
Umpires: Nitin Pandit and K. N. Ananthapadmanabhan

- Services won the toss and elected to field.

=== Round 4 ===
23 September 2018
9:00
Scorecard

Bengal; 272/9 (50 overs)	v	Tripura; 263/4 (50 overs)
Manoj Tiwary 67 (67); Rajat Dey 4/48 (10 overs)		Smit Patel 135* (153); Prayas Ray Barman 2/42 (10 overs)

Bengal won by 9 runs
MA Chidambaram Stadium, Chennai
Umpires: Sai Darshan Kumar and Rajesh Timaney

- Bengal won the toss and elected to bat.

23 September 2018
9:00
Scorecard

Jammu & Kashmir; 108 (34.3 overs)	v	Haryana; 112/7 (36.1 overs)
Paras Sharma 25 (68); Amit Mishra 3/26 (10 overs)		Himanshu Rana 30 (39); Auqib Nabi 3/32 (9 overs)

Haryana won by 3 wickets
Sri Ramachandra Medical College Ground, Chennai
Umpires: Sadashiv Iyer and Subrat Das

- Jammu & Kashmir won the toss and elected to bat.
- Auqib Nabi (Jammu & Kashmir) made his List A debut.

23 September 2018
9:00
Scorecard

Rajasthan; 133 (37.1 overs)	v	Tamil Nadu; 134/9 (34.5 overs)
Tajinder Singh 55 (58); Ravisrinivasan Sai Kishore 5/39 (10 overs)		Balchander Anirudh 40 (51); Rahul Chahar 3/35 (10 overs)

Tamil Nadu won by 1 wicket
TI Cycles Ground, Chennai
Umpires: K. N. Ananthapadmanabhan and Nand Kishore

- Tamil Nadu won the toss and elected to field.

=== Round 5 ===
24 September 2018
9:00
Scorecard

Gujarat; 212/6 (50 overs)	v	Tripura; 138/9 (50 overs)
Rujul Bhatt 62 (78); Harmeet Singh 3/28 (10 overs)		Joydeep Banik 57 (104); Piyush Chawla 4/21 (10 overs)

Gujarat won by 74 runs
Sri Sivasubramaniya Nadar College of Engineering Ground, Chennai
Umpires: K. N. Ananthapadmanabhan and Jayaraman Madanagopal

- Tripura won the toss and elected to field.
- Jaymin Chauhan (Gujarat) made his List A debut.

24 September 2018
9:00
Scorecard

Haryana; 257/8 (50 overs)	v	Services; 260/5 (47.3 overs)
Chaitanya Bishnoi 88* (126); Diwesh Pathania 5/42 (10 overs)		Nakul Verma 95 (118); Rahul Tewatia 2/53 (10 overs)

Services won by 5 wickets
TI Cycles Ground, Chennai
Umpires: Sadashiv Iyer and Subrat Das

- Haryana won the toss and elected to bat.

24 September 2018
9:00
Scorecard

Assam; 221/9 (50 overs)	v	Jharkhand; 222/2 (31 overs)
Sibsankar Roy 46 (78); Shahbaz Nadeem 3/47 (10 overs)		Ishan Kishan 139 (91); Mukhtar Hussain 2/55 (9 overs)

Jharkhand won by 8 wickets
MA Chidambaram Stadium, Chennai
Umpires: Sai Darshan Kumar and Nand Kishore

- Jharkhand won the toss and elected to field.

=== Round 6 ===
25 September 2018
9:00
Scorecard

Rajasthan; 179/9 (50 overs)	v	Gujarat; 180/2 (40 overs)
Chandrapal Singh 82* (95); Hardik Patel 5/22 (10 overs)		Kshitij Patel 89* (110); Tanveer Ul-Haq 1/26 (4 overs)

Gujarat won by 8 wickets
Indian Institute of Technology Chemplast Ground, Chennai
Umpires: Jayaraman Madanagopal and GS Ananth Ramakrishnan

- Rajasthan won the toss and elected to bat.
- Hemang Patel (Gujarat) made his List A debut.

25 September 2018
9:00
Scorecard

Bengal; 129 (38 overs)	v	Services; 130/2 (22 overs)
Abhimanyu Easwaran 34 (47); Varun Choudhary 3/23 (8 overs)		Rajat Paliwal 58* (55); Ashok Dinda 1/22 (6 overs)

Services won by 8 wickets
MA Chidambaram Stadium, Chennai
Umpires: Rajesh Timaney and Sadashiv Iyer

- Bengal won the toss and elected to bat.
- Ravi Chauhan (Services) made his List A debut.

25 September 2018
9:00
Scorecard

Jharkhand; 307/8 (50 overs)	v	Tamil Nadu; 299 (49.5 overs)
Ishan Kishan 85 (87); Varun Chakravarthy 3/61 (10 overs)		Baba Indrajith 101 (90); Anukul Roy 3/55 (10 overs)

Jharkhand won by 8 runs
Sri Sivasubramaniya Nadar College of Engineering Ground, Chennai
Umpires: K. N. Ananthapadmanabhan and Nand Kishore

- Jharkhand won the toss and elected to bat.

=== Round 7 ===
27 September 2018
9:00
Scorecard

Tamil Nadu; 334/4 (50 overs)	v	Assam; 204 (44.1 overs)
Vijay Shankar 129 (99); Amit Sinha 2/28 (7 overs); Jitumoni Kalita 2/28 (7 overs)		Riyan Parag 45 (71); Varun Chakravarthy 2/40 (9 overs)

Tamil Nadu won by 130 runs
Indian Institute of Technology Chemplast Ground, Chennai
Umpires: K. N. Ananthapadmanabhan and Nand Kishore

- Tamil Nadu won the toss and elected to bat.

27 September 2018
9:00
Scorecard

Haryana; 304 (49.2 overs)	v	Rajasthan; 157 (46.4 overs)
Pramod Chandila 88 (55); Tanveer Ul-Haq 3/62 (8 overs)		Abhimanyu Lamba 46 (67); Harshal Patel 3/19 (6 overs)

Haryana won by 147 runs
TI Cycles Ground, Chennai
Umpires: Sai Darshan Kumar and GS Ananth Ramakrishnan

- Rajasthan won the toss and elected to field.

27 September 2018
9:00
Scorecard

Jharkhand; 221/8 (50 overs)	v	Jammu & Kashmir; 148 (22.2 overs)
Anukul Roy 96* (72); Waseem Raza 3/51 (9 overs)		Mohammed Mudhasir 53* (28); Shahbaz Nadeem 5/17 (10 overs)

Jharkhand won by 73 runs
MA Chidambaram Stadium, Chennai
Umpires: Rajesh Timaney and Madanagopal Kuppuraj

- Jammu & Kashmir won the toss and elected to field.

=== Round 8 ===
28 September 2018
9:00
Scorecard

Tripura; 242/7 (50 overs)	v	Rajasthan; 194 (45.1 overs)
Bravish Shetty 107 (122); Rahul Chahar 3/44 (10 overs)		Robin Bist 42 (75); Rajib Saha 3/50 (10 overs)

Tripura won by 48 runs
Sri Sivasubramaniya Nadar College of Engineering Ground, Chennai
Umpires: Jayaraman Madanagopal and Nand Kishore

- Tripura won the toss and elected to bat.

28 September 2018
9:00
Scorecard

Gujarat; 219/7 (50 overs)	v	Services; 220/1 (38.1 overs)
Rujul Bhatt 56* (73); Diwesh Pathania 3/36 (10 overs)		Ravi Chauhan 106* (117); Piyush Chawla 1/51 (10 overs)

Services won by 9 wickets
TI Cycles Ground, Chennai
Umpires: K. N. Ananthapadmanabhan and Sai Darshan Kumar

- Services won the toss and elected to field.

28 September 2018
9:00
Scorecard

Assam; 150 (35.5 overs)	v	Bengal; 151/5 (25.4 overs)
Riyan Parag 32 (50); Pradipta Pramanik 4/27 (10 overs)		Vivek Singh 51 (51); Mrinmoy Dutta 3/46 (7.4 overs)

Bengal won by 5 wickets
MA Chidambaram Stadium, Chennai
Umpires: GS Ananth Ramakrishnan and Madanagopal Kuppuraj

- Bengal won the toss and elected to field.

=== Round 9 ===
30 September 2018
9:00
Scorecard

Tripura; 171 (45 overs)	v	Haryana; 175/7 (41.2 overs)
Bravish Shetty 60 (85); Harshal Patel 3/19 (6 overs)		Chaitanya Bishnoi 55* (111); Rajib Saha 3/25 (10 overs)

Haryana won by 3 wickets
Sri Sivasubramaniya Nadar College of Engineering Ground, Chennai
Umpires: Rajesh Timaney and Sadashiv Iyer

- Tripura won the toss and elected to bat.
- Treyaksh Bali (Haryana) made his List A debut.

30 September 2018
9:00
Scorecard

Jammu & Kashmir; 123 (34 overs)	v	Gujarat; 127/2 (21.1 overs)
Ian Dev Singh 35 (59); Piyush Chawla 3/29 (9 overs)		Priyank Kirit Panchal 49 (48); Umar Nazir 1/37 (5 overs)

Gujarat won by 8 wickets
Indian Institute of Technology Chemplast Ground, Chennai
Umpires: Sai Darshan Kumar and Madanagopal Kuppuraj

- Jammu & Kashmir won the toss and elected to bat.

30 September 2018
9:00
Scorecard

Bengal; 239 (49.4 overs)	v	Tamil Nadu; 240/4 (42 overs)
Abhimanyu Easwaran 72 (97); Vijay Shankar 4/34 (8 overs)		Abhinav Mukund 94 (100); Prayas Ray Barman 2/35 (10 overs)

Tamil Nadu won by 6 wickets
MA Chidambaram Stadium, Chennai
Umpires: Nand Kishore and Subrat Das

- Tamil Nadu won the toss and elected to field.

=== Round 10 ===
1 October 2018
9:00
Scorecard

Bengal; 267/8 (50 overs)	v	Jharkhand; 264/9 (49 overs)
Abhimanyu Easwaran 149 (162); Varun Aaron 3/48 (10 overs)		Anand Singh 118 (114); Writtick Chatterjee 3/46 (10 overs)

Jharkhand won by 2 runs (VJD method)
TI Cycles Ground, Chennai
Umpires: Sai Darshan Kumar and Rajesh Timaney

- Jharkhand won the toss and elected to field.

1 October 2018
9:00
Scorecard

Rajasthan; 217/7 (50 overs)	v	Assam; 161 (38.4 overs)
Manender Singh 101 (126); Jitumoni Kalita 2/48 (10 overs)		Amit Sinha 52 (70); Tanveer Ul-Haq 3/27 (7 overs)

Rajasthan won by 56 runs
MA Chidambaram Stadium, Chennai
Umpires: Akshay Totre and Madanagopal Kuppuraj

- Assam won the toss and elected to field.
- Abhijeet Tomar (Rajasthan) made his List A debut.

1 October 2018
9:00
Scorecard

Services; 322 (49 overs)	v	Jammu & Kashmir; 220 (42.2 overs)
Nakul Sharma 123 (98); Parvez Rasool 5/62 (10 overs)		Paras Sharma 93 (97); Arjun Sharma 4/43 (10 overs)

Services won by 102 runs
Sri Ramachandra Medical College Ground, Chennai
Umpires: Nand Kishore and Sadashiv Iyer

- Jammu & Kashmir won the toss and elected to field.
- Asif Khan (Jammu & Kashmir) made his List A debut.

=== Round 11 ===
3 October 2018
9:00
Scorecard

Haryana; 247/7 (50 overs)	v	Gujarat; 203 (46.1 overs)
Himanshu Rana 67 (82); Chintan Gaja 3/44 (9 overs)		Chirag Gandhi 52 (79); Jayant Yadav 3/35 (10 overs)

Haryana won by 44 runs
MA Chidambaram Stadium, Chennai
Umpires: Akshay Totre and Madanagopal Kuppuraj

- Gujarat won the toss and elected to field.

3 October 2018
9:00
Scorecard

Tripura; 196 (46.4 overs)	v	Tamil Nadu; 197/2 (31.2 overs)
Smit Patel 60 (72); V. Athisayaraj Davidson 3/46 (6 overs)		Abhinav Mukund 131* (100); Harmeet Singh 2/46 (10 overs)

Tamil Nadu won by 8 wickets
Indian Institute of Technology Chemplast Ground, Chennai
Umpires: Sanjeev Dua and Vineet Kulkarni

- Tripura won the toss and elected to bat.
- V. Athisayaraj Davidson (Tamil Nadu) and Ninad Kadam (Tripura) both made their List A debuts.

3 October 2018
9:00
Scorecard

Rajasthan; 218/8 (50 overs)	v	Jammu & Kashmir; 179/7 (35.3 overs)
Salman Khan 60 (74); Parvez Rasool 3/36 (10 overs)		Shubham Khajuria 57 (61); Rahul Chahar 3/37 (8 overs)

Jammu & Kashmir won by 3 wickets (VJD method)
Sri Sivasubramaniya Nadar College of Engineering Ground, Chennai
Umpires: Jayaraman Madanagopal and Subrat Das

- Rajasthan won the toss and elected to bat.
- Rasikh Salam (Jammu & Kashmir) made his List A debut.

=== Round 12 ===
5 October 2018
9:00
Scorecard

Assam	v	Services

Match abandoned
Sri Ramachandra Medical College Ground, Chennai
Umpires: Akshay Totre and Madanagopal Kuppuraj

- No toss.
- No play was possible due to rain.

5 October 2018
9:00
Scorecard

Bengal; 140/9 (21 overs)	v	Haryana; 69/6 (14 overs)
Manoj Tiwary 60* (43); Arun Chaprana 2/28 (5 overs)		Pramod Chandila 18* (21); Sahabaz Ahmed 2/18 (4 overs)

No result
MA Chidambaram Stadium, Chennai
Umpires: Jayaraman Madanagopal and Vineet Kulkarni

- Haryana won the toss and elected to field.
- The match was reduced to 21 overs per side due to rain.

5 October 2018
9:00
Scorecard

Jharkhand	v	Tripura

Match abandoned
TI Cycles Ground, Chennai
Umpires: Akshay Totre and Madanagopal Kuppuraj

- No toss.
- No play was possible due to rain.

=== Round 13 ===
7 October 2018
9:00
Scorecard

Tamil Nadu; 168 (39.4 overs)	v	Jammu & Kashmir; 169/6 (40.3 overs)
Abhinav Mukund 49 (63); Umar Alam 4/26 (9 overs)		Parvez Rasool 71* (70); Varun Chakravarthy 3/34 (9 overs)

Jammu & Kashmir won by 4 wickets
MA Chidambaram Stadium, Chennai
Umpires: Sanjeev Dua and Subrat Das

- Jammu & Kashmir won the toss and elected to field.
- The match was reduced to 41 overs per side due to rain.
- Umar Alam (Jammu & Kashmir) made his List A debut.

7 October 2018
9:00
Scorecard

Gujarat; 107 (25 overs)	v	Jharkhand; 108/5 (21.4 overs)
Piyush Chawla 41 (39); Varun Aaron 3/21 (5 overs)		Ishan Kishan 64 (52); Piyush Chawla 3/21 (5 overs)

Jharkhand won by 5 wickets
Sri Sivasubramaniya Nadar College of Engineering Ground, Chennai
Umpires: Vineet Kulkarni and GS Ananth Ramakrishnan

- Gujarat won the toss and elected to bat.
- The match was reduced to 25 overs per side due to rain.

7 October 2018
9:00
Scorecard

Rajasthan; 177/9 (43 overs)	v	Bengal; 181/4 (37.4 overs)
Mahipal Lomror 79* (86); Ishan Porel 4/30 (9 overs)		Vivek Singh 65 (50); Deepak Chahar 2/29 (7 overs)

Bengal won by 6 wickets
TI Cycles Ground, Chennai
Umpires: Akshay Totre and Sadashiv Iyer

- Bengal won the toss and elected to field.
- The match was reduced to 43 overs per side due to rain.

=== Round 14 ===
9 October 2018
9:00
Scorecard

Services; 139 (41.1 overs)	v	Rajasthan; 140/3 (43 overs)
Ravi Chauhan 47 (93); Rahul Chahar 5/29 (10 overs)		Manender Singh 83* (114); Abhishek Tiwari 1/11 (7 overs)

Rajasthan won by 7 wickets
Sri Sivasubramaniya Nadar College of Engineering Ground, Chennai
Umpires: GS Ananth Ramakrishnan and Subrat Das

- Services won the toss and elected to bat.

9 October 2018
9:00
Scorecard

Tripura; 209 (49.1 overs)	v	Assam; 211/2 (44.1 overs)
Bishal Ghosh 100 (134); Arup Das 3/25 (9 overs)		Rishav Das 87* (122); Rajib Saha 1/29 (10 overs)

Assam won by 8 wickets
TI Cycles Ground, Chennai
Umpires: Akshay Totre and Madanagopal Kuppuraj

- Tripura won the toss and elected to bat.
- Abhijit Roy (Assam) made his List A debut.

9 October 2018
9:00
Scorecard

Haryana; 310/5 (50 overs)	v	Tamil Nadu; 233/9 (50 overs)
Rahul Tewatia 91* (59); Varun Chakravarthy 2/55 (10 overs)		Abhinav Mukund 47 (54); Rahul Tewatia 2/27 (6 overs)

Haryana won by 77 runs
Indian Institute of Technology Chemplast Ground, Chennai
Umpires: Sanjeev Dua and Vineet Kulkarni

- Haryana won the toss and elected to bat.
- Sharun Kumar (Tamil Nadu) made his List A debut.

=== Round 15 ===
11 October 2018
9:00
Scorecard

Jharkhand; 291 (50 overs)	v	Services; 265 (47.4 overs)
Kumar Deobrat 88 (112); Diwesh Pathania 2/40 (10 overs)		Rahul Singh 75 (92); Anukul Roy 4/53 (9.4 overs)

Jharkhand won by 25 runs
TI Cycles Ground, Chennai
Umpires: Vineet Kulkarni and Akshay Totre

- Services won the toss and elected to field.

11 October 2018
9:00
Scorecard

Jammu & Kashmir; 272/7 (50 overs)	v	Assam; 193 (48.2 overs)
Ahmed Bandy 79 (99); Romario Sharma 1/6 (2 overs)		Amit Sinha 81 (108); Irfan Pathan 3/38 (8.2 overs)

Jammu & Kashmir won by 79 runs
Sri Sivasubramaniya Nadar College of Engineering Ground, Chennai
Umpires: GS Ananth Ramakrishnan and Sadashiv Iyer

- Jammu & Kashmir won the toss and elected to bat.

11 October 2018
9:00
Scorecard

Gujarat; 214/9 (50 overs)	v	Bengal; 173 (44.2 overs)
Priyank Kirit Panchal 50 (65); Pradipta Pramanik 2/36 (10 overs)		Sudip Chatterjee 36 (63); Rujul Bhatt 2/22 (8.2 overs)

Gujarat won by 41 runs
MA Chidambaram Stadium, Chennai
Umpires: Jayaraman Madanagopal and Madanagopal Kuppuraj

- Gujarat won the toss and elected to bat.
