= 2019–20 Vijay Hazare Trophy Plate Group =

Cricket tournament

- Dates: 24 September – 17 October 2019
- Administrator(s): BCCI
- Cricket format: List A cricket
- Tournament format(s): Round-robin
- Participants: 10

The 2019–20 Vijay Hazare Trophy is the 18th season of the Vijay Hazare Trophy, a List A cricket tournament in India. It is being contested by 38 teams, divided into four groups, with ten teams in Plate Group. The group stage started on 24 September 2019. The top team in the Plate Group progressed to the quarter-finals of the competition.

Seventeen out of the first thirty matches that were scheduled to be played across all four groups were abandoned or finished in a no result. Therefore, the Board of Control for Cricket in India (BCCI) issued a revised schedule for the rain-affected matches. The statistics for cancelled matches were revoked leading to Rongsen Jonathan missing out on his maiden hundred in List A cricket.

After the final group matches, Pondicherry finished top of the Plate Group to progress to the knockout phase of the tournament.

== Points table ==
Pos	Team	Pld	W	L	T	NR	Pts	NRR
1	Pondicherry	9	7	0	0	2	32	3.523
2	Chandigarh	9	6	2	0	1	26	0.759
3	Uttarakhand	9	5	1	0	3	26	2.236
4	Assam	9	6	3	0	0	24	1.670
5	Nagaland	9	4	2	0	3	22	−0.140
6	Meghalaya	9	3	4	0	2	16	0.559
7	Arunachal Pradesh	9	2	6	0	1	10	−1.373
8	Manipur	9	1	5	0	3	10	−1.807
9	Mizoram	9	1	6	0	2	8	−2.276
10	Sikkim	9	1	7	0	1	6	−1.847

- Top team advanced to the knockout stage and gets promoted to Elite Group C for the next season.

== Fixtures ==
=== Round 1 ===
24 September 2019
Scorecard

Meghalaya; 318/5 (50 overs)	v	Sikkim; 124 (46.3 overs)
Dwaraka Ravi Teja 109* (88); Bhushan Subba 2/38 (7 overs)		Yashpal Singh 53 (88); Aditya Singhania 4/18 (7 overs)

Meghalaya won by 194 runs
Tanush Academy Ground, Dehradun
Umpires: Tapan Sharma and Sundaram Ravi

- Sikkim won the toss and elected to field.
- Aditya Singhania, Akash Choudhary, Sanjay Yadav, Swarajeet Das (Meghalaya), Chitiz Tamang and Nitesh Gupta (Sikkim) all made their List A debuts.

24 September 2019
Scorecard

Arunachal Pradesh; 267/7 (50 overs)	v	Mizoram; 268/3 (45.4 overs)
Samarth Seth 102 (117); Sumit Lama 2/35 (9 overs)		KB Pawan 108* (98); Shashwat Kohli 2/19 (4 overs)

Mizoram won by 7 wickets
Abhimanyu Cricket Academy, Dehradun
Umpires: Akshay Totre and Sadashiv Iyer

- Arunachal Pradesh won the toss and elected to bat.
- Shashwat Kohli, Sumit Nagar, Uvais Ahmad (Arunachal Pradesh), Bobby Zothansanga, Parvez Ahmed and Sumit Lama (Mizoram) all made their List A debuts.

=== Round 2 ===
25 September 2019
Scorecard

Assam; 324/3 (50 overs)	v	Mizoram; 211/6 (50 overs)
Swarupam Purkayastha 163* (150); Sumit Lama 1/40 (8 overs)		Abrar Kazi 78* (91); Roshan Alam 4/45 (10 overs)

Assam won by 113 runs
Tanush Academy Ground, Dehradun
Umpires: Tapan Sharma and Sadashiv Iyer

- Mizoram won the toss and elected to field.
- Rahul Hazarika, Roshan Alam and Hrishikesh Tamuli (Assam) all made their List A debuts.

25 September 2019
Scorecard

Meghalaya; 107 (26.1 overs)	v	Pondicherry; 108/6 (23.5 overs)
Dwaraka Ravi Teja 21 (24); Sagar Trivedi 4/18 (5.1 overs)		Suresh Kumar 37* (45); Abhay Negi 4/17 (6 overs)

Pondicherry won by 4 wickets
Abhimanyu Cricket Academy, Dehradun
Umpires: Nikhil Patwardhan and Sundaram Ravi

- Pondicherry won the toss and elected to field.
- The match was reduced to 28 overs per side due to rain.
- Karthik Sukumaran (Pondicherry) made his List A debut.

=== Round 3 ===
27 September 2019
Scorecard

Assam; 171/9 (28 overs)	v	Uttarakhand; 172/3 (26.4 overs)
Rahul Hazarika 39 (50); Dikshanshu Negi 3/31 (6 overs)		Unmukt Chand 80* (78); Pritam Das 2/29 (5.4 overs)

Uttarakhand won by 7 wickets
Rajiv Gandhi International Cricket Stadium, Dehradun
Umpires: Krishnaraj Srinath and Nikhil Patwardhan

- Uttarakhand won the toss and elected to field.
- The match was reduced to 28 overs per side due to a wet outfield.
- Pradeep Chamoli, Dikshanshu Negi and Avneesh Sudha (Uttarakhand) both made their List A debuts.

=== Round 4 ===
28 September 2019
Scorecard

Arunachal Pradesh	v	Meghalaya

Match abandoned
Tanush Academy Ground, Dehradun
Umpires: Akshay Totre and Sundaram Ravi

- No toss.
- No play was possible due to a wet outfield.

28 September 2019
Scorecard

Manipur; 120 (30.4 overs)	v	Sikkim; 0/2 (1 over)
Prafullomani Singh 27 (28); Yashpal Singh 4/22 (6.4 overs)		Ashish Thapa 0* (0); Rex Rajkumar 2/0 (1 over)

No result
Rajiv Gandhi International Cricket Stadium, Dehradun
Umpires: Tapan Sharma and Sadashiv Iyer

- Manipur won the toss and elected to bat.
- Rain during Sikkim's innings prevented any further play.
- Karnajit Yumnam, Johnson Singh, Ahmed Shah, Langlonyamba Keishangbam, Kishan Thokchom and Ajay Lamabam (Manipur) all made their List A debuts.

28 September 2019
Scorecard

Uttarakhand; 172 (46.4 overs)	v	Pondicherry
Dhanraj Sharma 76 (48); Sagar Trivedi 6/50 (8.4 overs)

No result
Abhimanyu Cricket Academy, Dehradun
Umpires: Krishnaraj Srinath and Nikhil Patwardhan

- Pondicherry won the toss and elected to field.
- Rain during Pondicherry's innings prevented any further play.

=== Round 5 ===
29 September 2019
Scorecard

Chandigarh	v	Manipur

Match abandoned
Tanush Academy Ground, Dehradun
Umpires: Krishnaraj Srinath and Nikhil Patwardhan

- No toss.
- No play was possible due to rain.

29 September 2019
Scorecard

Mizoram	v	Nagaland

Match abandoned
Abhimanyu Cricket Academy, Dehradun
Umpires: Tapan Sharma and Sadashiv Iyer

- No toss.
- No play was possible due to rain.

=== Round 6 ===
1 October 2019
Scorecard

Sikkim; 111/4 (21 overs)	v	Chandigarh; 115/6 (20.4 overs)
Yashpal Singh 39* (32); Gurinder Singh 3/19 (4 overs)		Arjun Azad 29 (32); Yashpal Singh 2/19 (4 overs)

Chandigarh won by 4 wickets
Rajiv Gandhi International Cricket Stadium, Dehradun
Umpires: Tapan Sharma and Sadashiv Iyer

- Sikkim won the toss and elected to bat.
- The match was reduced to 21 overs per side due to rain.
- Arjun Azad, Shivam Bhambri, Preet Kamal, Jaskaranvir Singh, Anirudh Kanwar (Chandigarh) and Tashi Bhalla (Sikkim) all made their List A debuts.

1 October 2019
Scorecard

Manipur	v	Uttarakhand

Match abandoned
Tanush Academy Ground, Dehradun
Umpires: Akshay Totre and Sundaram Ravi

- No toss.
- No play was possible due to a wet outfield.

1 October 2019
Scorecard

Meghalaya	v	Nagaland

Match abandoned
Abhimanyu Cricket Academy, Dehradun
Umpires: Krishnaraj Srinath and Nikhil Patwardhan

- No toss.
- No play was possible due to a wet outfield.

=== Round 7 ===
2 October 2019
Scorecard

Chandigarh; 207/2 (20 overs)	v	Arunachal Pradesh; 117/7 (20 overs)
Manan Vohra 108* (64); Karkir Taye 1/27 (4 overs)		Rahul Dalal 76* (52); Gurinder Singh 4/12 (4 overs)

Chandigarh won by 90 runs
Abhimanyu Cricket Academy, Dehradun
Umpires: Krishnaraj Srinath and Nikhil Patwardhan

- Chandigarh won the toss and elected to bat.
- The match was reduced to 20 overs per side due to a wet outfield.
- Karkir Taye (Arunachal Pradesh) made his List A debut.

2 October 2019
Scorecard

Assam; 207 (47.4 overs)	v	Nagaland; 137 (41.4 overs)
Abu Nechim 31 (30); Nagaho Chishi 5/25 (7.4 overs)		Rongsen Jonathan 46 (84); Pritam Das 5/22 (8.4 overs)

Assam won by 70 runs
Tanush Academy Ground, Dehradun
Umpires: Tapan Sharma and Sadashiv Iyer

- Nagaland won the toss and elected to field.
- Tejosel Yiethun, Aosashi Longchar and Nagaho Chishi (Nagaland) all made their List A debuts.

2 October 2019
Scorecard

Mizoram; 67 (33.2 overs)	v	Pondicherry; 71/0 (13.2 overs)
Taruwar Kohli 28 (72); Damodaren Rohit 3/2 (2.2 overs)		Vikneshwaran Marimuthu 44* (40)

Pondicherry won by 10 wickets
Rajiv Gandhi International Cricket Stadium, Dehradun
Umpires: Sundaram Ravi and Akshay Totre

- Pondicherry won the toss and elected to field.

=== Round 8 ===
4 October 2019
Scorecard

Chandigarh; 166/7 (20 overs)	v	Assam; 145 (19.5 overs)
Preet Kamal 34 (25); Pritam Das 3/26 (4 overs)		Swarupam Purkayastha 32 (27); Bipul Sharma 3/14 (3 overs)

Chandigarh won by 21 runs
Kasiga School Cricket Ground, Dehradun
Umpires: Nikhil Patwardhan and Sadashiv Iyer

- Chandigarh won the toss and elected to bat.
- The match was reduced to 20 overs per side due to a wet outfield.

4 October 2019
Scorecard

Mizoram	v	Uttarakhand

Match abandoned
Abhimanyu Cricket Academy, Dehradun
Umpires: Tapan Sharma and Sundaram Ravi

- No toss.
- No play was possible due to a wet outfield.

4 October 2019
Scorecard

Nagaland; 24/2 (6.4 overs)	v	Pondicherry
Aosashi Longchar 12 (15); Vinay Kumar 1/11 (3.4 overs)

No result
Rajiv Gandhi International Cricket Stadium, Dehradun
Umpires: Krishnaraj Srinath and Akshay Totre

- Nagaland won the toss and elected to bat.
- Rain during Nagaland's innings prevented any further play.
- Moakumzuk Tzudir (Nagaland) made his List A debut.

=== Round 9 ===
5 October 2019
Scorecard

Sikkim; 268/7 (50 overs)	v	Arunachal Pradesh; 272/2 (45.4 overs)
Yashpal Singh 71 (74); Akhilesh Sahani 2/47 (10 overs)		Samarth Seth 155* (147); Padam Limboo 1/28 (4 overs)

Arunachal won by 8 wickets
Rajiv Gandhi International Cricket Stadium, Dehradun
Umpires: Krishnaraj Srinath and Tapan Sharma

- Sikkim won the toss and elected to bat.
- Neelam Obi (Arunachal Pradesh) made his List A debut.

5 October 2019
Scorecard

Manipur; 90 (25.1 overs)	v	Meghalaya; 94/7 (18.4 overs)
Ahmed Shah 24 (28); Sanjay Yadav 3/19 (6.1 overs)		Puneet Bisht 27 (29); Bishworjit Konthoujam 3/30 (7 overs)

Meghalaya won by 3 wickets
Abhimanyu Cricket Academy, Dehradun
Umpires: Sai Darshan Kumar and Akshay Totre

- Manipur won the toss and elected to bat.
- The match was reduced to 40 overs per side due to a wet outfield.
- Al Bashid Muhammed (Manipur) made his List A debut.

=== Round 10 ===
7 October 2019
Scorecard

Arunachal Pradesh; 199 (48.4 overs)	v	Uttarakhand; 202/2 (23.2 overs)
Rahul Dalal 95 (93); Pradeep Chamoli 4/31 (10 overs)		Unmukt Chand 87 (57); Samarth Seth 1/21 (4 overs)

Uttarakhand won by 8 wickets
Tanush Academy Ground, Dehradun
Umpires: Krishnaraj Srinath and Tapan Sharma

- Uttarakhand won the toss and elected to field.

7 October 2019
Scorecard

Assam; 255/7 (50 overs)	v	Manipur; 75 (24.4 overs)
Gokul Sharma 88 (107); Rex Rajkumar 4/60 (10 overs)		Johnson Singh 22 (32); Pritam Das 5/5 (4.4 overs)

Assam won by 180 runs
Abhimanyu Cricket Academy, Dehradun
Umpires: Nikhil Patwardhan and Krishnamachari Srinivasan

- Manipur won the toss and elected to field.
- Amlanjyoti Das (Assam) made his List A debut.

7 October 2019
Scorecard

Chandigarh; 152 (45.3 overs)	v	Pondicherry; 155/2 (26 overs)
Jaskaran Singh 36 (42); Sagar Udeshi 3/29 (10 overs)		Karthik Sukumaran 70* (75); Arjun Azad 1/23 (4 overs)

Pondicherry won by 8 wickets
Kasiga School Cricket Ground, Dehradun
Umpires: Sai Darshan Kumar and Akshay Totre

- Pondicherry won the toss and elected to field.

=== Round 11 ===
8 October 2019
Scorecard

Meghalaya; 316/5 (50 overs)	v	Mizoram; 139 (38 overs)
Raj Biswa 134 (141); Abrar Kazi 3/33 (10 overs)		K. B. Pawan 52 (83); Swarajeet Das 3/17 (4 overs)

Meghalaya won by 177 runs
Abhimanyu Cricket Academy, Dehradun
Umpires: Sai Darshan Kumar and Rajeev Godara

- Meghalaya won the toss and elected to bat.
- Lalruatdika (Mizoram) made his List A debut.

8 October 2019
Scorecard

Nagaland; 174 (44.5 overs)	v	Uttarakhand; 176/3 (36.2 overs)
Stuart Binny 107 (108); Rahil Shah 2/13 (10 overs)		Avneesh Sudha 77 (71); Shrikant Mundhe 2/30 (6 overs)

Uttarakhand won by 7 wickets
Rajiv Gandhi International Cricket Stadium, Dehradun
Umpires: Rajesh Timaney and Madanagopal Kuppuraj

- Nagaland won the toss and elected to bat.
- Ashish Chaudhary, Aditya Sethi (Uttarakhand) and Vayu Haralu (Nagaland) all made their List A debuts.

8 October 2019
Scorecard

Sikkim; 112 (36.3 overs)	v	Pondicherry; 116/0 (11.4 overs)
Iqbal Abdulla 29 (36); Ashith Rajiv 6/37 (10 overs)		Paras Dogra 70* (41)

Pondicherry won by 10 wickets
Tanush Academy Ground, Dehradun
Umpires: Pranav Joshi and Krishnamachari Srinivasan

- Sikkim won the toss and elected to bat.
- Dinesh Rai (Sikkim) made his List A debut.

=== Round 12 ===
10 October 2019
Scorecard

Arunachal Pradesh; 179 (42.3 overs)	v	Pondicherry; 180/1 (27.1 overs)
Rahul Dalal 40 (47); Ashith Rajiv 3/42 (8.3 overs)		Arun Karthik 86* (68); Techi Neri 1/34 (7 overs)

Pondicherry won by 9 wickets
Abhimanyu Cricket Academy, Dehradun
Umpires: Rajesh Timaney and Madanagopal Kuppuraj

- Arunachal Pradesh won the toss and elected to bat.
- The match was reduced to 43 overs per side due to a wet outfield
- Santha Moorthy (Pondicherry) made his List A debut.

10 October 2019
Scorecard

Sikkim; 176 (48.5 overs)	v	Assam; 177/3 (36.3 overs)
Yashpal Singh 63 (87); Roshan Alam 5/33 (10 overs)		Pallavkumar Das 117* (115); Iqbal Abdulla 1/37 (9 overs)

Assam won by 7 wickets
Tanush Academy Ground, Dehradun
Umpires: Sai Darshan Kumar and Pranav Joshi

- Sikkim won the toss and elected to bat.

10 October 2019
Scorecard

Mizoram; 87 (39.3 overs)	v	Chandigarh; 89/0 (12.5 overs)
K. B. Pawan 18 (28); Bipul Sharma 3/21 (9 overs)		Arjun Azad 46* (42)

Chandigarh won by 10 wickets
Kasiga School Cricket Ground, Dehradun
Umpires: Rajeev Godara and Krishnamachari Srinivasan

- Mizoram won the toss and elected to bat.
- Gaurav Puri (Chandigarh), Lalhruaizela and K Lalhmingmawia (Mizoram) all made their List A debuts.

=== Round 13 ===
11 October 2019
Scorecard

Arunachal Pradesh; 225/7 (50 overs)	v	Manipur; 143 (41.3 overs)
Rahul Dalal 84 (79); Kangabam Singh 3/41 (10 overs)		Johnson Singh 36 (63); Akhilesh Sahani 3/22 (7.3 overs)

Arunachal won by 82 runs
Tanush Academy Ground, Dehradun
Umpires: Rajeev Godara and Krishnamachari Srinivasan

- Arunachal Pradesh won the toss and elected to bat.
- Yab Niya (Arunachal Pradesh) and Thomas Moirangthem (Manipur) both made their List A debuts.

11 October 2019
Scorecard

Uttarakhand; 294/9 (50 overs)	v	Meghalaya; 174 (42.4 overs)
Karn Kaushal 103 (103); Sanjay Yadav 2/53 (9 overs)		Raj Biswa 74 (75); Avneesh Sudha 3/16 (5.4 overs)

Uttarakhand won by 120 runs
Rajiv Gandhi International Cricket Stadium, Dehradun
Umpires: Sai Darshan Kumar and Pranav Joshi

- Uttarakhand won the toss and elected to bat.
- Larry Sangma (Meghalaya) made his List A debut.

11 October 2019
Scorecard

Sikkim; 138 (44.3 overs)	v	Nagaland; 140/6 (36.5 overs)
Ashish Thapa 32 (63); Shrikant Mundhe 3/28 (9 overs); Imliwati Lemtur 3/28 (9 overs)		Rongsen Jonathan 36 (47); Ishwar Chaudhary 3/29 (9 overs)

Nagaland won by 4 wickets
Tanush Academy Ground, Dehradun
Umpires: Rajesh Timaney and Madanagopal Kuppuraj

- Sikkim won the toss and elected to bat.

=== Round 14 ===
13 October 2019
Scorecard

Arunachal Pradesh; 112 (40.1 overs)	v	Assam; 116/0 (14.3 overs)
Neelam Obi 29 (74); Riyan Parag 4/27 (10 overs)		Pallavkumar Das 76* (40)

Assam won by 10 wickets
Tanush Academy Ground, Dehradun
Umpires: Sai Darshan Kumar

- Arunachal Pradesh won the toss and elected to bat.
- Lobsang Pandan (Arunachal Pradesh) made his List A debut.

13 October 2019
Scorecard

Manipur; 170 (49.3 overs)	v	Mizoram; 161/8 (50 overs)
Sultan Karim 47 (97); Parvez Ahmed 4/30 (8.3 overs)		Taruwar Kohli 64* (115); Kishan Thokchom 2/17 (8 overs)

Manipur won by 9 runs
Abhimanyu Cricket Academy, Dehradun
Umpires: Rajeev Godara and Madanagopal Kuppuraj

- Manipur won the toss and elected to bat.
- Ronald Longjam (Manipur) made his List A debut.

13 October 2019
Scorecard

Uttarakhand; 305/9 (50 overs)	v	Sikkim; 52 (21.1 overs)
Avneesh Sudha 69 (64); Padam Limboo 2/50 (7 overs)		Ashish Thapa 16 (20); Sunny Rana 5/26 (9 overs)

Uttarakhand won by 253 runs
Kasiga School Cricket Ground, Dehradun
Umpires: Pranav Joshi and Krishnamachari Srinivasan

- Uttarakhand won the toss and elected to bat.
- Tanush Gusain (Uttarakhand) made his List A debut.

=== Round 15 ===
14 October 2019
Scorecard

Meghalaya; 100 (34.5 overs)	v	Assam; 104/4 (17.4 overs)
Dwaraka Ravi Teja 51* (85); Roshan Alam 4/25 (8.5 overs)		Sibsankar Roy 69* (54); Abhay Negi 3/39 (9 overs)

Assam won by 6 wickets
Kasiga College Ground, Dehradun
Umpires: Pranav Joshi and Madanagopal Kuppuraj

- Meghalaya won the toss and elected to bat.
- Tengchan Sangma and Wallam Kynshi (Meghalaya) both made their List A debuts.

14 October 2019
Scorecard

Chandigarh; 220 (49.4 overs)	v	Nagaland; 222/9 (48.4 overs)
Ankit Kaushik 55 (51); Tahmeed Rahman 3/28 (10 overs)		Aosashi Longchar 76 (117); Shresth Nirmohi 5/37 (10 overs)

Nagaland won by 1 wicket
Abhimanyu Cricket Academy, Dehradun
Umpires: Rajeev Godara and Krishnamachari Srinivasan

- Nagaland won the toss and elected to field.
- Arpit Pannu (Chandigarh) and Temjentoshi Jamir (Nagaland) both made their List A debuts.

14 October 2019
Scorecard

Manipur; 109 (30.1 overs)	v	Pondicherry; 115/1 (16.1 overs)
Kangabam Singh 44* (43); Vinay Kumar 4/21 (6.1 overs)		Arun Karthik 67* (63); Kangabam Singh 1/21 (3 overs)

Pondicherry won by 9 wickets
Abhimanyu Cricket Academy, Dehradun
Umpires: Sai Darshan Kumar and Rajesh Timaney

- Manipur won the toss and elected to bat.

=== Round 16 ===
16 October 2019
Scorecard

Arunachal Pradesh; 212/7 (50 overs)	v	Nagaland; 213/6 (45.2 overs)
Rahul Dalal 61 (76); Imliwati Lemtur 4/33 (10 overs)		Yogesh Takawale 91 (97); Techi Neri 2/49 (10 overs)

Nagaland won by 4 wickets
Abhimanyu Cricket Academy, Dehradun
Umpires: Rajesh Timaney and Madanagopal Kuppuraj

- Arunachal Pradesh won the toss and elected to bat.

16 October 2019
Scorecard

Meghalaya; 184/8 (50 overs)	v	Chandigarh; 187/4 (43.5 overs)
Sanjay Yadav 61* (63); Anirudh Kanwar 2/30 (10 overs)		Arjun Azad 70 (96); Swarajeet Das 1/27 (5 overs)

Chandigarh won by 6 wickets
Kasiga College Ground, Dehradun
Umpires: Sai Darshan Kumar and Rajeev Godara

- Chandigarh won the toss and elected to field.

16 October 2019
Scorecard

Mizoram; 188 (49.4 overs)	v	Sikkim; 64 (16 overs)
Iqbal Abdulla 56 (75); Parvez Ahmed 4/33 (7.4 overs)		Lalhmangaiha 41 (55); Padam Limboo 6/20 (6 overs)

Sikkim won by 124 runs
Rajiv Gandhi International Cricket Stadium, Dehradun
Umpires: Pranav Joshi and Krishnamachari Srinivasan

- Sikkim won the toss and elected to bat.

=== Round 17 ===
17 October 2019
Scorecard

Assam; 115 (36.1 overs)	v	Pondicherry; 116/5 (22 overs)
Pallavkumar Das 27 (35); Ashith Rajiv 4/17 (7.1 overs)		Paras Dogra 44 (52); Pritam Das 2/39 (7 overs)

Pondicherry won by 5 wickets
Abhimanyu Cricket Academy, Dehradun
Umpires: Pranav Joshi and Madanagopal Kuppuraj

- Pondicherry won the toss and elected to field.

17 October 2019
Scorecard

Uttarakhand; 253/8 (50 overs)	v	Chandigarh; 254/8 (49 overs)
Tanmay Srivastava 102* (140); Jaskaran Singh 4/44 (10 overs)		Uday Kaul 102 (128); Dhanraj Sharma 4/70 (10 overs)

Chandigarh won by 2 wickets
Rajiv Gandhi International Cricket Stadium, Dehradun
Umpires: Sai Darshan Kumar and Rajeev Godara

- Uttarakhand won the toss and elected to bat.

17 October 2019
Scorecard

Nagaland; 240 (48.2 overs)	v	Manipur; 235/8 (50 overs)
Yogesh Takawale 90 (121); Bishworjit Konthoujam 7/54 (9.2 overs)		Al Bashid Muhammed 100 (159); Imliwati Lemtur 2/41 (10 overs)

Nagaland won by 5 runs
Tanush Academy Ground, Dehradun
Umpires: Krishnamachari Srinivasan and Rajesh Timaney

- Manipur won the toss and elected to field.
