= 2013–14 Senior Women's T20 League =

- Dates: 2 – 14 February 2014
- Administrator: BCCI
- Cricket format: Twenty20
- Tournament format: Round-robin
- Champions: Railways (5th title)
- Runners-up: Hyderabad
- Participants: 26
- Matches: 66
- Most runs: Latika Kumari (204)
- Most wickets: Ekta Bisht (13)

The 2013–14 Senior Women's T20 League was the 6th edition of the women's Twenty20 cricket competition in India. It took place in February 2014 with 26 teams divided into an Elite Group and a Plate Group. Railways won the tournament, their fifth in a row, by topping the Elite Group Super League.

== Competition format ==
The 26 teams competing in the tournament were divided into the Elite Group and the Plate Group, with the 10 teams in the Elite Group further divided into Groups A and B and the 16 teams in the Plate Group into Groups A, B and C. The tournament operated on a round-robin format, with each team playing every other team in their group once. The top two sides from each Elite Group progressed to the Elite Group Super League, which was a further round-robin group, with the winner of the group being crowned Champions. The bottom side from each Elite Group was relegated to the Plate Group for the following season. Meanwhile, the top two from each Plate Group progressed to a knockout stage, with the two teams that reached the final being promoted for the following season, as well as playing off for the Plate Group title. The Twenty20 format was used, with each of the two innings in a match spanning a maximum of 20 overs.

The groups worked on a points system with positions with the groups based on the total points. Points were awarded as follows:

Win: 4 points.
Tie: 2 points.
Loss: 0 points.
No Result/Abandoned: 2 points.

If points in the final table are equal, teams are separated by most wins, then head-to-head record, then Net Run Rate.

== Elite Group ==
=== Elite Group A ===
Team	P	W	L	T	NR	Pts	NRR
Railways (Q)	4	4	0	0	0	'146	+1.433
Hyderabad (Q)	4	3	1	0	0	12	+1.361
Odisha	4	2	2	0	0	8	–0.365
Maharashtra	4	1	3	0	0	4	+0.252
Haryana (R)	4	0	4	0	0	0	–2.784

=== Elite Group B ===
Team	P	W	L	T	NR	Pts	NRR
Gujarat (Q)	4	3	1	0	0	12	+0.426
Punjab (Q)	4	3	1	0	0	12	+0.329
Madhya Pradesh	4	3	1	0	0	12	+0.295
Kerala	4	1	3	0	0	4	–0.074
Assam (R)	4	0	4	0	0	0	–1.002

=== Elite Group Super League ===
Team	P	W	L	T	NR	Pts	NRR
Railways (C)	3	3	0	0	0	12	+0.538
Hyderabad	3	2	1	0	0	8	+0.587
Punjab	3	1	2	0	0	4	+0.090
Gujarat	3	0	3	0	0	0	–1.286

Source: CricketArchive

== Plate Group ==
=== Plate Group A ===
Team	P	W	L	T	NR	Pts	NRR
Goa (Q)	5	5	0	0	0	20	+0.672
Delhi (Q)	5	4	1	0	0	16	+1.223
Karnataka	5	3	2	0	0	12	+0.470
Jharkhand	5	2	3	0	0	8	–0.904
Saurashtra	5	1	4	0	0	4	–0.939
Tripura	5	0	5	0	0	0	–0.488

=== Plate Group B ===
Team	P	W	L	T	NR	Pts	NRR
Mumbai (Q)	4	4	0	0	0	16	+0.435
Tamil Nadu (Q)	4	2	2	0	0	8	+1.424
Rajasthan	4	2	2	0	0	8	+1.402
Himachal Pradesh	4	2	2	0	0	8	+1.393
Jammu and Kashmir	4	0	4	0	0	0	–4.660

=== Plate Group C ===
Team	P	W	L	T	NR	Pts	NRR
Andhra (Q)	4	3	1	0	0	12	+1.390
Bengal (Q)	4	3	1	0	0	12	+1.077
Uttar Pradesh	4	3	1	0	0	12	+0.551
Baroda	4	1	3	0	0	4	–1.051
Vidarbha	4	0	4	0	0	0	–2.606

Advanced to Plate Group Semi-finals
Advanced to Plate Group Quarter-finals

Source: CricketArchive

=== Knockout stage ===
Quarter-finals
C1	Andhra	141/3
B2	Tamil Nadu	102/6
A1	Goa	61/8
C2	Bengal	62/1

Semi-finals
C1	Andhra	114/9
A2	Delhi	115/3
C2	Bengal	94/9
B1	Mumbai	95/5

Final
A2	Delhi	51
B1	Mumbai	55/3

==== Quarter-finals ====
11 February 2014
Scorecard

Andhra; 141/3 (20 overs)	v	Tamil Nadu; 102/6 (20 overs)
Sabbhineni Meghana 53* (39); Lakhmi Nethra 2/25 (4 overs)		Dayalan Hemalatha 22 (31); Challa Jhansi Lakshmi 2/15 (4 overs)

Andhra won by 39 runs
Tata Digwadih Stadium, Dhanbad
Umpires: Ranjeev Sharma and Rajesh Timaney

- Andhra won the toss and elected to bat.

11 February 2014
Scorecard

Goa; 61/8 (20 overs)	v	Bengal; 62/1 (11.3 overs)
Nikita Malik 17* (25); Paramita Roy 2/9 (2 overs)		Paramita Roy 28* (33); Rupali Chavan 1/10 (2 overs)

Bengal won by 9 wickets
Nehru Smarak Stadium, Bhagalpur
Umpires: Ganesh Charhate and Nikhil Menon

- Goa won the toss and elected to bat.

==== Semi-finals ====
12 February 2014
Scorecard

Andhra; 114/9 (20 overs)	v	Delhi; 115/3 (18 overs)
Sabbhineni Meghana 51 (42); Soni Yadav 2/15 (3 overs)		Latika Kumari 53* (58); Dhana Lakshmi 1/3 (1 overs)

Delhi won by 7 wickets
Tata Digwadih Stadium, Dhanbad
Umpires: Nikhil Menon and Rajesh Timaney

- Andhra won the toss and elected to bat.

12 February 2014
Scorecard

Bengal; 94/9 (20 overs)	v	Mumbai; 95/5 (18.1 overs)
Priyanka Roy 49 (48); Sarika Koli 3/24 (4 overs)		Sulakshana Naik 32 (33); Paramita Roy 2/10 (4 overs)

Mumbai won by 5 wickets
Nehru Smarak Stadium, Bhagalpur
Umpires: Ganesh Charhate and Ranjeev Sharma

- Mumbai won the toss and elected to field.

==== Final ====
14 February 2014
Scorecard

Delhi; 51 (17 overs)	v	Mumbai; 55/3 (13.1 overs)
Mandeep Kaur 9 (18); Humaira Kazi 5/8 (4 overs)		Apoorva Kokil 18* (19); Babita Negi 2/9 (4 overs)

Mumbai won by 7 wickets
Jharkhand State Cricket Association International Stadium, Ranchi
Umpires: Nikhil Menon and Ranjeev Sharma

- Mumbai won the toss and elected to field.
- Mumbai and Delhi are promoted to the Elite Group.

== Statistics ==
=== Most runs ===
Player	Team	Matches	Innings	Runs	Average	HS	100s	50s
Latika Kumari	Delhi	7	7	204	40.80	53*	0	1
Rumeli Dhar	Rajasthan	4	4	178	59.33	93*	0	1
Sabbhineni Meghana	Andhra	6	6	173	57.66	53*	0	2
Mamatha Kanojia	Hyderabad	7	7	171	28.50	73	0	1
Shikha Pandey	Goa	6	6	162	32.40	73	0	1

Source: CricketArchive

=== Most wickets ===
Player	Team	Overs	Wickets	Average	BBI	5w
Ekta Bisht	Railways	28.0	13	5.92	4/7	0
Salma Banu	Goa	23.0	12	9.83	6/21	1
Babita Negi	Delhi	24.0	11	7.36	3/14	0
Vellore Mahesh Kavya	Hyderabad	27.0	11	8.36	3/6	0
Rupali Chavan	Goa	22.0	11	8.45	3/16	0

Source: CricketArchive
