= 2022–23 Vijay Hazare Trophy Group C =

Cricket tournament

- Dates: 12 November – 2 December 2022
- Administrator(s): BCCI
- Cricket format: List A cricket
- Tournament format(s): Round-robin
- Participants: 8

The 2022–23 Vijay Hazare Trophy is the twenty first season of the Vijay Hazare Trophy, a List A cricket tournament that is being played in India. It was contested by 38 teams, divided into five groups, with eight teams in Group C. The tournament was announced by the BCCI on 8 August 2022.

== Points table ==
| Pos | Team | Pld | W | L | T | NR | Pts | NRR |
|---|---|---|---|---|---|---|---|---|
| 1 | Tamil Nadu | 7 | 5 | 0 | 0 | 2 | 24 | 3.106 |
| 2 | Kerala | 7 | 4 | 1 | 0 | 2 | 20 | 1.809 |
| 3 | Andhra Pradesh | 7 | 4 | 2 | 0 | 1 | 18 | 1.066 |
| 4 | Haryana | 7 | 3 | 2 | 1 | 1 | 16 | 1.241 |
| 5 | Chhattisgarh | 7 | 3 | 3 | 0 | 1 | 14 | 0.362 |
| 6 | Goa | 7 | 2 | 3 | 1 | 1 | 12 | 0.252 |
| 7 | Bihar | 7 | 0 | 5 | 0 | 2 | 4 | −2.550 |
| 8 | Arunachal Pradesh | 7 | 0 | 5 | 0 | 2 | 4 | −6.159 |

Source: ESPN Cricinfo
Rules for classification: 1) Points; 2) Head-to-head; 3) Net run rate.

Advances to Quarter-final
Advances to Preliminary quarter-final

== Fixtures ==
=== Round 1 ===
12 November 2022
Scorecard

| Chhattisgarh; 137/4 (21 overs) | v | Arunachal Pradesh; 35/2 (8.1 overs) |
| Akhil Herwadkar 71 (54); Chetan Anand 1/19 (3 overs) | | Neelam Obi 15 (19); Ajay Mandal 1/15 (4 overs) |

No result
M. Chinnaswamy Stadium, Bengaluru
Umpires: Abhijit Deshmukh and Sanjay Kumar Singh

- Arunachal Pradesh won the toss and elected to field.
- The match was reduced to 21 overs per side due to rain.
- Arunachal Pradesh were set a revised target of 178 runs from 21 overs due to rain.
- Rain during Arunachal Pradesh's innings prevented any further play.
- Anuj Tiwary, Mayank Yadav (Chhattisgarh), Amresh Rohit, Chetan Anand, Limar Dabi, Nabam Abo, Rohan Sharma and Tanmay Gupta (Arunachal Pradesh) all made their List A debuts.

12 November 2022
Scorecard

| Kerala; 44/2 (14 overs) | v | Haryana |
| Rohan Kunnummal 28* (48); Mohit Sharma 1/9 (4 overs) |

No result
Three Ovals KSCA Stadium, Bengaluru
Umpires: Anil Chaudhary and Ranjeev Sharma

- Haryana won the toss and elected to field.
- The match was reduced to 38 overs per side due to rain.
- Rain during Kerala's innings prevented any further play.
- Abdul Basith, Vaisakh Chandran, Akhil Scaria (Kerala), Dinesh Bana, Nishant Sindhu and Yuvraj Singh (Haryana) all made their List A debuts.

12 November 2022
Scorecard

| Tamil Nadu; 106/2 (17.1 overs) | v | Bihar |
| Sai Sudharsan 49 (38); Harsh Singh 1/17 (3 overs) |

No result
Three Ovals KSCA Stadium, Bengaluru
Umpires: Manish Jain and Navdeep Singh

- Bihar won the toss and elected to field.
- The match was reduced to 38 overs per side due to rain.
- Rain during Tamil Nadu's innings prevented any further play.
- Harsh Singh and Surya Vansh (Bihar) both made their List A debuts.

12 November 2022
Scorecard

| Andhra Pradesh; 96/1 (21 overs) | v | Goa |
| Ashwin Hebbar 42* (62); Felix Alemao 1/16 (5 overs) |

No result
Three Ovals KSCA Stadium, Bengaluru
Umpires: Nitin Pandit and Pashchim Pathak

- Goa won the toss and elected to field.
- The match was reduced to 38 overs per side due to rain.
- Rain during Andhra Pradesh's innings prevented any further play.
- Arjun Tendulkar and Mohit Redkar (Goa) both made their List A debuts.

=== Round 2 ===
13 November 2022
Scorecard

| Haryana; 222/9 (50 overs) | v | Chhattisgarh; 171 (40.2 overs) |
| Himanshu Rana 54 (74); Ajay Mandal 4/49 (10 overs) | | Harpreet Singh Bhatia 66 (82); Jaideep Bhambhu 3/39 (9 overs) |

Haryana won by 35 runs (VJD method)
M. Chinnaswamy Stadium, Bengaluru
Umpires: Abhijit Deshmukh and Pashchim Pathak

- Chhattisgarh won the toss and elected to field.
- Chhattisgarh were set a revised target of 207 runs from 45 overs due to rain.

13 November 2022
Scorecard

| Arunachal Pradesh; 102 (29.3 overs) | v | Kerala; 105/1 (10.3 overs) |
| Amresh Rohit 59 (96); Nedumankuzhy Basil 4/17 (7.3 overs) | | Rohan Kunnummal 77* (28); Limar Dabi 1/1 (1 over) |

Kerala won by 9 wickets
Three Ovals KSCA Stadium, Bengaluru
Umpires: Anil Chaudhary and Manish Jain

- Arunachal Pradesh won the toss and elected to bat.

13 November 2022
Scorecard

| Andhra Pradesh; 205 (45.3 overs) | v | Tamil Nadu; 206/1 (32.1 overs) |
| Abhishek Reddy 85 (99); Ragupathy Silambarasan 3/49 (8 overs) | | Narayan Jagadeesan 114* (112) |

Tamil Nadu won by 9 wickets
Three Ovals KSCA Stadium, Bengaluru
Umpires: Nitin Pandit and Navdeep Singh

- Tamil Nadu won the toss and elected to field.

13 November 2022
Scorecard

| Goa; 329/6 (50 overs) | v | Bihar; 241 (46.5 overs) |
| Darshan Misal 107* (62); Ashutosh Aman 3/42 (9 overs) | | Sachin Kumar 76 (84); Arjun Tendulkar 2/32 (7 overs) |

Goa won by 88 runs
Three Ovals KSCA Stadium, Bengaluru
Umpires: Ranjeev Sharma and Sanjay Kumar Singh

- Bihar won the toss and elected to field.

=== Round 3 ===
15 November 2022
Scorecard

| Goa; 241/8 (50 overs) | v | Kerala; 242/5 (38.1 overs) |
| Darshan Misal 69 (87); Akhil Scaria 3/34 (10 overs) | | Rohan Kunnummal 134 (101); Siddhesh Lad 3/19 (5.1 overs) |

Kerala won by 5 wickets
M. Chinnaswamy Stadium, Bengaluru
Umpires: Anil Chaudhary and Nitin Pandit

- Kerala won the toss and elected to field.

15 November 2022
Scorecard

| Tamil Nadu; 340/6 (50 overs) | v | Chhattisgarh; 326/8 (50 overs) |
| Sai Sudharsan 121 (109); Ravi Kiran 3/69 (10 overs) | | Harpreet Singh Bhatia 121 (129); Sonu Yadav 3/47 (8 overs) |

Tamil Nadu won by 14 runs
Three Ovals KSCA Stadium, Bengaluru
Umpires: Navdeep Singh and Ranjeev Sharma

- Chhattisgarh won the toss and elected to field.

15 November 2022
Scorecard

| Andhra Pradesh; 367/3 (50 overs) | v | Arunachal Pradesh; 106 (38 overs) |
| Abhishek Reddy 136 (133); Tanmay Gupta 2/43 (10 overs) | | Kamsha Yangfo 18 (30); Bandaru Ayyappa 3/15 (8 overs) |

Andhra Pradesh won by 261 runs
Three Ovals KSCA Stadium, Bengaluru
Umpires: Abhijit Deshmukh and Pashchim Pathak

- Arunachal Pradesh won the toss and elected to field.

15 November 2022
Scorecard

| Bihar; 158 (47.5 overs) | v | Haryana; 159/1 (22.2 overs) |
| Sachin Kumar 33 (58); Jayant Yadav 3/26 (9 overs) | | Himanshu Rana 101* (57); Harsh Singh 1/23 (4 overs) |

Haryana won by 9 wickets
Three Ovals KSCA Stadium, Bengaluru
Umpires: Manish Jain and Sanjay Kumar Singh

- Haryana won the toss and elected to field.
- Raghuvendra Pratap Singh (Bihar), Kapil Hooda and Anshul Kamboj (Haryana) all made their List A debuts.

=== Round 4 ===
17 November 2022
Scorecard

| Chhattisgarh; 171 (48.1 overs) | v | Kerala; 175/2 (36.1 overs) |
| Ashutosh Singh 40 (62); Akhil Scaria 4/25 (9.1 overs) | | Ponnan Rahul 92* (106); Sourabh Majumdar 1/24 (5 overs) |

Kerala won by 8 wickets
M. Chinnaswamy Stadium, Bengaluru
Umpires: Anil Chaudhary and Ranjeev Sharma

- Chhattisgarh won the toss and elected to bat.

17 November 2022
Scorecard

| Andhra Pradesh; 302/7 (50 overs) | v | Bihar; 170 (44.3 overs) |
| Ashwin Hebbar 154 (141); Malay Raj 2/42 (6 overs) | | Veer Pratap Singh 60 (49); Harishankar Reddy 3/21 (8.3 overs) |

Andhra Pradesh won by 132 runs
Three Ovals KSCA Stadium, Bengaluru
Umpires: Nitin Pandit and Pashchim Pathak

- Bihar won the toss and elected to field.
- Shaik Rasheed (Andhra Pradesh) made his List A debut.

17 November 2022
Scorecard

| Haryana; 397/8 (50 overs) | v | Arunachal Pradesh; 91 (32.3 overs) |
| Chaitanya Bishnoi 134 (124); Yab Niya 5/84 (10 overs) | | Kamsha Yangfo 23 (29); Rahul Tewatia 4/24 (8 overs) |

Haryana won by 306 runs
Three Ovals KSCA Stadium, Bengaluru
Umpires: Abhijit Deshmukh and Sanjay Kumar Singh

- Arunachal Pradesh won the toss and elected to field.
- Ngurang James, Teshi Tiku and Mapu Yigam (Arunachal Pradesh) all made their List A debuts.

17 November 2022
Scorecard

| Tamil Nadu; 373/4 (50 overs) | v | Goa; 316/6 (50 overs) |
| Narayan Jagadeesan 168 (140); Arjun Tendulkar 2/61 (10 overs) | | Snehal Kauthankar 67 (84); Sai Sudharsan 1/10 (1 over) |

Tamil Nadu won by 57 runs
Three Ovals KSCA Stadium, Bengaluru
Umpires: Manish Jain and Navdeep Singh

- Goa won the toss and elected to field.
- Ruthvik Naik (Goa) made his List A debut.

=== Round 5 ===
19 November 2022
Scorecard

| Andhra Pradesh; 259/9 (50 overs) | v | Kerala; 183 (44.1 overs) |
| Ricky Bhui 46 (54); Sijomon Joseph 3/49 (10 overs) | | Akshay Chandran 41 (72); Nitish Kumar Reddy 3/23 (6.1 overs) |

Andhra Pradesh won by 76 runs
M. Chinnaswamy Stadium, Bengaluru
Umpires: Anil Chaudhary and Manish Jain

- Kerala won the toss and elected to field.

19 November 2022
Scorecard

| Tamil Nadu; 284/7 (50 overs) | v | Haryana; 133 (28.3 overs) |
| Narayan Jagadeesan 128 (123); Mohit Sharma 2/43 (9 overs) | | Rahul Tewatia 34 (39); Baba Aparajith 3/24 (4 overs) |

Tamil Nadu won by 151 runs
Three Ovals KSCA Stadium, Kolkata
Umpires: Nitin Pandit and Navdeep Singh

- Haryana won the toss and elected to field.

19 November 2022
Scorecard

| Chhattisgarh; 304/7 (50 overs) | v | Bihar; 241/9 (50 overs) |
| Harpreet Singh Bhatia 120 (108); Malay Raj 2/41 (8 overs) | | Bipin Saurabh 110* (86); Shubham Agarwal 3/47 (10 overs) |

Chhattisgarh won by 63 runs
Three Ovals KSCA Stadium, Bengaluru
Umpires: Abhijit Deshmukh and Pashchim Pathak

- Bihar won the toss and elected to field.
- Adhiraj Johri and Shishir Saket (Bihar) both made their List A debuts.

19 November 2022
Scorecard

| Arunachal Pradesh; 175 (50 overs) | v | Goa; 176/5 (25.3 overs) |
| Kamsha Yangfo 63 (107); Amulya Pandrekar 5/41 (9 overs) | | Snehal Kauthankar 68 (50); Mapu Yigam 2/35 (6 overs) |

Goa won by 5 wickets
Three Ovals KSCA Stadium, Bengaluru
Umpires: Ranjeev Sharma and Sanjay Kumar Singh

- Goa won the toss and elected to field.
- Vedant Naik (Goa) made his List A debut.

=== Round 6 ===
21 November 2022
Scorecard

| Tamil Nadu; 506/2 (50 overs) | v | Arunachal Pradesh; 71 (28.4 overs) |
| Narayan Jagadeesan 277 (141); Techi Doria 1/27 (2 overs) | | Kamsha Yangfo 17 (48); Manimaran Siddharth 5/12 (7.4 overs) |

Tamil Nadu won by 435 runs
M. Chinnaswamy Stadium, Bengaluru
Umpires: Nitin Pandit and Navdeep Singh

- Arunachal Pradesh won the toss and elected to field.
- Narayan Jagadeesan (Tamil Nadu) set the highest-ever individual List A score with his 277 from 141 balls, breaking the previous record of 268 by Ali Brown.
- Tamil Nadu's final score of 506/2 was a record for the highest-ever team total in a List A match, breaking England's 498/4 against the Netherlands set five months prior.

21 November 2022
Scorecard

| Bihar; 201 (49.3 overs) | v | Kerala; 205/1 (24.4 overs) |
| Sakibul Gani 68 (103); Sijomon Joseph 4/49 (10 overs) | | Rohan Kunnummal 107* (75); Sachin Kumar 1/20 (3 overs) |

Kerala won by 9 wickets
Three Ovals KSCA Stadium, Bengaluru
Umpires: Abhijit Deshmukh and Anil Chaudhary

- Bihar won the toss and elected to bat.
- Gaurav and Himanshu Singh (Bihar) both made their List A debuts.

21 November 2022
Scorecard

| Haryana; 258/7 (50 overs) | v | Andhra Pradesh; 262/7 (48.5 overs) |
| Yuvraj Singh 85 (121); Bandaru Ayyappa 3/47 (10 overs) | | Ricky Bhui 112* (98); Anshul Kamboj 2/38 (8 overs) |

Andhra Pradesh won by 3 wickets
Three Ovals KSCA Stadium, Bengaluru
Umpires: Pashchim Pathak and Ranjeev Sharma

- Andhra Pradesh won the toss and elected to field.

21 November 2022
Scorecard

| Chhattisgarh; 226/8 (50 overs) | v | Goa; 185 (47 overs) |
| Harpreet Singh Bhatia 77 (91); Ruthvik Naik 4/29 (10 overs) | | Ishaan Gadekar 67 (87); Sumit Ruikar 3/37 (10 overs) |

Chhattisgarh won by 41 runs
Just Cricket Academy Ground, Bengaluru
Umpires: Manish Jain and Sanjay Kumar Singh

- Chhattisgarh won the toss and elected to bat.
- Aayush Thakur (Chhattisgarh) made his List A debut.

=== Round 7 ===
23 November 2022
Scorecard

| Arunachal Pradesh; 170 (48.4 overs) | v | Bihar; 56/2 (13.5 overs) |
| Amresh Rohit 51 (53); Ashutosh Aman 3/19 (9.4 overs) | | Shishir Saket 31* (48); Yab Niya 2/22 (7 overs) |

No result
M. Chinnaswamy Stadium, Bengaluru
Umpires: Nitin Pandit and Sanjay Kumar Singh

- Bihar won the toss and elected to field.
- Rain during Bihar's innings prevented any further play.
- Ravi Shankar (Bihar) made his List A debut.

23 November 2022
Scorecard

| Goa; 261/9 (50 overs) | v | Haryana; 154/5 (23 overs) |
| Snehal Kauthankar 104 (115); Rahul Tewatia 3/62 (10 overs) | | Chaitanya Bishnoi 47 (59); Siddhesh Lad 2/33 (4 overs) |

Match tied (VJD method)
Three Ovals KSCA Stadium, Bengaluru
Umpires: Pashchim Pathak and Ranjeev Sharma

- Goa won the toss and elected to bat.
- Haryana were set a revised target of 155 runs from 23 overs due to rain.

23 November 2022
Scorecard

| Andhra Pradesh; 144 (42.3 overs) | v | Chhattisgarh; 147/2 (26.3 overs) |
| Nitish Kumar Reddy 50 (54); Sumit Ruikar 4/23 (10 overs) | | Harpreet Singh Bhatia 65* (54); Girinath Reddy 1/36 (6 overs) |

Chhattisgarh won by 8 wickets
Three Ovals KSCA Stadium, Bengaluru
Umpires: Abhijit Deshmukh and Navdeep Singh

- Chhattisgarh won the toss and elected to field.

23 November 2022
Scorecard

| Kerala; 287/8 (50 overs) | v | Tamil Nadu; 43/1 (7 overs) |
| Vathsal Govind 95* (126); M. Mohammed 2/51 (10 overs) | | Narayan Jagadeesan 23 (21); Vaisakh Chandran 1/15 (4 overs) |

No result
Just Cricket Academy Ground, Bengaluru
Umpires: Anil Chaudhary and Manish Jain

- Tamil Nadu won the toss and elected to field.
- Rain during Tamil Nadu's innings prevented any further play.
