= Sarbeswar Mohanty =

Sarbeswar Mohanty may refer to:

- Sarbeswar Mohanty (cricketer)
- Sarbeswar Mohanty (civil servant)
