= 2015–16 Syed Mushtaq Ali Trophy Group B =

Cricket tournament

- Dates: 2 January 2016 – 10 January 2016
- Administrator: BCCI
- Cricket format: Twenty20 cricket
- Tournament format: Round robin
- Host: Kerala
- Participants: 7
- Matches: 21

2015–16 Syed Mushtaq Ali Trophy is the seventh season of the Syed Mushtaq Ali Trophy, a Twenty20 cricket tournament in India. It is contested by 27 domestic cricket teams of India. Group B consisted of Punjab, Rajasthan, Jharkhand, Saurashtra, Tripura, Kerala and Jammu & Kashmir.

== Round 1 ==
2 January 2016
Scorecard

Punjab; 130/6 (20 overs)	v	Rajasthan; 133/6 (19.4 overs)

Rajasthan won by 4 wickets
Nehru Stadium, Kochi

- Baltej Singh, Pargat Singh (Punjab); Kukna Ajay Singh and Manender Singh (Rajasthan) all made their T20 debuts.

2 January 2016
Scorecard

Jammu & Kashmir; 126/6 (20 overs)	v	Kerala; 129/5 (18.4 overs)

Kerala won by 5 wickets
St Paul's College Ground, Kochi

- Rohit Sharma (Jammu & Kashmir) and Mohammed Azharuddeen (Kerala) both made their T20 debuts.

2 January 2016
Scorecard

Saurashtra; 144/6 (20 overs)	v	Tripura; 78 (17.3 overs)

Saurashtra won by 66 runs
Nehru Stadium, Kochi

- Shaurya Sanandia (Saurashtra); Rajat Dey and Nirupam Sen (Tripura) all made their T20 debuts.

== Round 2 ==
3 January 2016
Scorecard

Jammu & Kashmir; 105 (19.3 overs)	v	Punjab; 108/2 (14.3 overs)

Punjab won by 8 wickets
Nehru Stadium, Kochi

3 January 2016
Scorecard

Tripura; 146/7 (20 overs)	v	Jharkhand; 150/1 (18.3 overs)

Jharkhand won by 9 wickets
Nehru Stadium, Kochi

- Ankit Dabas, Monu Kumar and Sumit Kumar (Jharkhand) made their T20 debuts.

3 January 2016
Scorecard

Kerala; 129/7 (20 overs)	v	Rajasthan; 111/8 (20 overs)

Kerala won by 18 runs
St Paul's College Ground, Kochi

== Round 3 ==
4 January 2016
Scorecard

Saurashtra; 157/7 (20 overs)	v	Jammu & Kashmir; 84 (17.1 overs)

Saurashtra won by 73 runs
Nehru Stadium, Kochi

4 January 2016
Scorecard

Rajasthan; 120/9 (20 overs)	v	Jharkhand; 121/2 (19.5 overs)

Jharkhand won by 8 wickets
Nehru Stadium, Kochi

4 January 2016
Scorecard

Tripura; 111 (19.5 overs)	v	Kerala; 113/2 (16.1 overs)

Kerala won by 8 wickets
St Paul's College Ground, Kochi

== Round 4 ==
6 January 2016
Scorecard

Jharkhand; 104/9 (20 overs)	v	Punjab; 105/3 (17.3 overs)

Punjab won by 7 wickets
Nehru Stadium, Kochi

6 January 2016
Scorecard

Jammu & Kashmir; 119 (19.1 overs)	v	Tripura; 121/6 (18.2 overs)

Tripura won by 4 wickets
Nehru Stadium, Kochi

- Omar Alam (Jammu & Kashmir) made his T20 debut.

6 January 2016
Scorecard

Kerala; 165/9 (20 overs)	v	Saurashtra; 115/9 (20 overs)

Kerala won by 50 runs
St Paul's College Ground, Kochi

== Round 5 ==
7 January 2016
Scorecard

Jharkhand; 179/4 (20 overs)	v	Jammu & Kashmir; 103/7 (20 overs)

Jharkhand won by 76 runs
Nehru Stadium, Kochi

- Shasheem Rathour and Sonu Singh (Jharkhand) made their T20 debuts.

7 January 2016
Scorecard

Tripura; 96 (18 overs)	v	Punjab; 100/2 (15.3 overs)

Punjab won by 8 wickets
Nehru Stadium, Kochi

- Ammol Malhotra (Punjab) made his T20 debut.

7 January 2016
Scorecard

Saurashtra; 140/5 (20 overs)	v	Rajasthan; 115 (19.3 overs)

Saurashtra won by 25 runs
St Paul's College Ground, Kochi

- Prerak Mankad (Saurashtra) made his T20 debut.

== Round 6 ==
9 January 2016
Scorecard

Saurashtra; 128/5 (20 overs)	v	Jharkhand; 132/3 (19.3 overs)

Jharkhand won by 7 wickets
Nehru Stadium, Kochi

9 January 2016
Scorecard

Punjab; 135/7 (20 overs)	v	Kerala; 139/5 (19.5 overs)

Kerala won by 5 wickets
St Paul's College Ground, Kochi

9 January 2016
Scorecard

Rajasthan; 112/9 (20 overs)	v	Tripura; 113/9 (20 overs)

Tripura won by 1 wicket
Nehru Stadium, Kochi

- Sidhant Dobal (Rajasthan) and Viki Saha (Tripura) both made their T20 debuts.

== Round 7 ==
10 January 2016
Scorecard

Saurashtra; 167/5 (20 overs)	v	Punjab; 148 (19.2 overs)

Saurashtra won by 19 runs
Nehru Stadium, Kochi

10 January 2016
Scorecard

Rajasthan; 174/5 (20 overs)	v	Jammu & Kashmir; 129/7 (20 overs)

Rajasthan won by 45 runs
Nehru Stadium, Kochi

- Jatin Wadhwan (Jammu & Kashmir) made his T20 debut.

10 January 2016
Scorecard

Kerala; 169/6 (20 overs)	v	Jharkhand; 174/4 (19 overs)

Jharkhand won by 6 wickets
St Paul's College Ground, Kochi
