= Harsh Singh =

Harsh Singh may refer to:

- Harsh Singh (politician) (born 1954), Indian MLA
- Harsh Singh (cricketer) (born 1995), Indian cricketer
- Harsh Singh (judoka) (born 2003), Indian judoka
