= Jaymon =

Jaymon is a given name and surname. Notable people with the name include:

- Jaymon Crabb (born 1978), Australian tennis player
- Jehan Jaymon (born 1971), Sri Lankan cricketer

== See also ==
- Jaymin Chauhan (born 1991), Indian cricketer
