= Lobsang Pandan =

Indian cricketer (born 1996)

Personal information
- Born: 7 January 1996 (age 30)
- Source: ESPNcricinfo, 16 October 2019

Lobsang Pandan (born 7 January 1996) is an Indian cricketer. He made his List A debut on 13 October 2019, for Arunachal Pradesh in the 2019–20 Vijay Hazare Trophy.
