= Madhav Avsh =

Indian cricketer (born 1992)

Personal information
- Born: 19 December 1992 (age 33); Moradabad, Uttar Pradesh
- Source: ESPNcricinfo, 8 March 2019

Madhav Avsh (born 19 December 1992) is an Indian cricketer. He made his Twenty20 debut for Arunachal Pradesh in the 2018–19 Syed Mushtaq Ali Trophy on 27 February 2019.
