= Sumit Nagar =

Indian cricketer (born 1998)

Personal information
- Born: 22 October 1998 (age 28); Faridabad, Haryana
- Source: Cricinfo, 24 September 2019

Sumit Nagar (born 22 October 1998) is an Indian cricketer. He made his List A debut on 24 September 2019, for Arunachal Pradesh in the 2019–20 Vijay Hazare Trophy.
