= Robin Toko =

Indian cricketer (born 1991)

Personal information
- Full name: Robin Taba Toko
- Born: 26 September 1991 (age 35); Papum Pare, Arunachal Pradesh
- Source: Cricinfo, 30 December 2018

Robin Toko (born 26 September 1991) is an Indian cricketer. He made his first-class debut for Arunachal Pradesh in the 2018–19 Ranji Trophy on 30 December 2018. He made his Twenty20 debut for Arunachal Pradesh in the 2018–19 Syed Mushtaq Ali Trophy on 21 February 2019.
