= Subhash Sharma =

Indian cricketer (born 1993)

Personal information
- Full name: Subhash Sharma
- Born: 1 October 1993 (age 33); Malsisar, Rajasthan
- Batting: Right-handed
- Bowling: Right arm medium

Domestic team information
- Years: Team
- 2018–19: Arunachal Pradesh
- Source: Cricinfo, 1 November 2018

Subhash Sharma (born 1 October 1993) is an Indian cricketer. He made his first-class debut for Arunachal Pradesh in the 2018–19 Ranji Trophy on 1 November 2018. He made his Twenty20 debut for Arunachal Pradesh in the 2018–19 Syed Mushtaq Ali Trophy on 21 February 2019.
