= Patiram Parija =

Chief Patron of Nabarabi

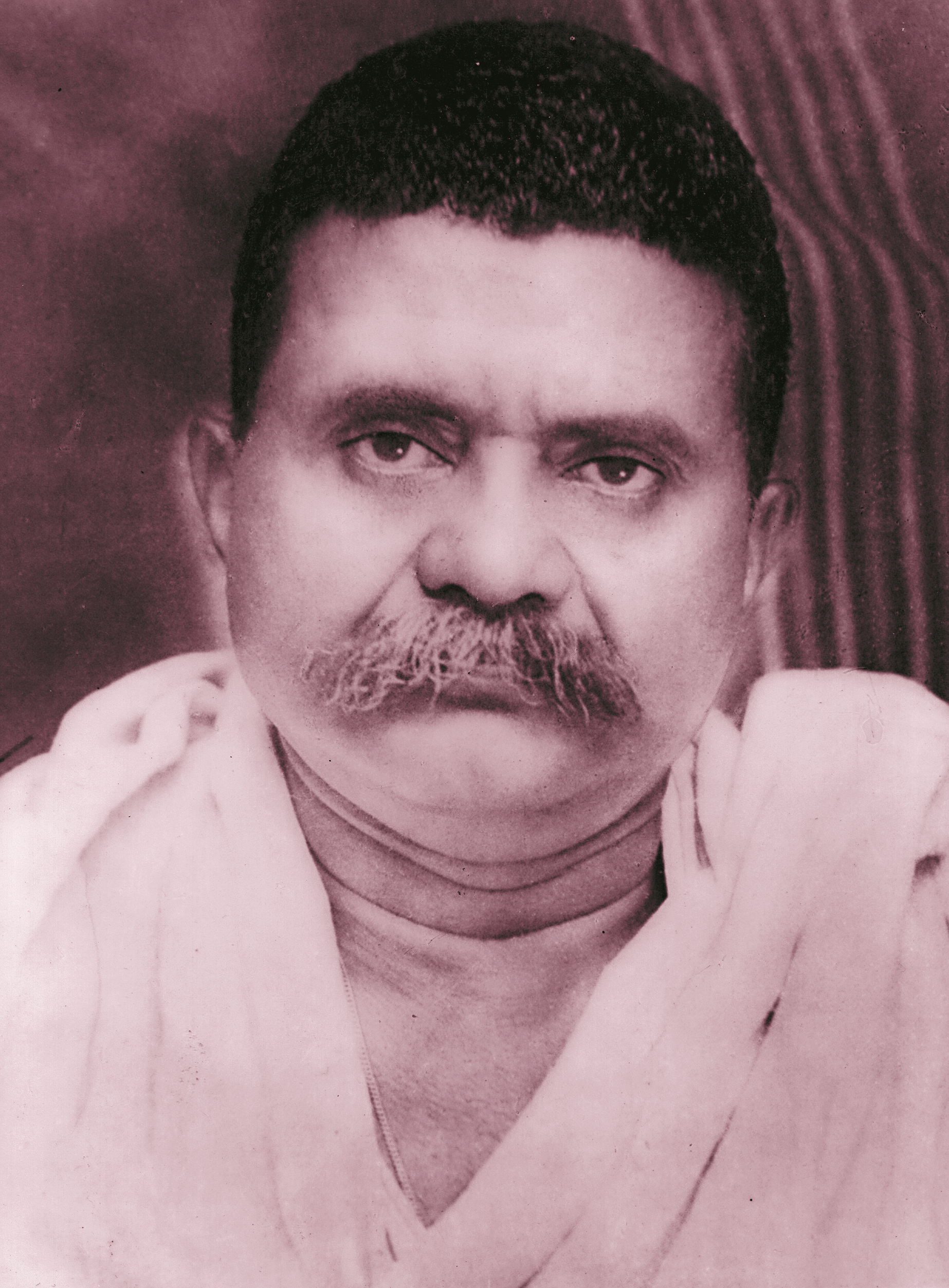
- Born: Padma Charan Parija; Jagatsinghpur, Odisha, India
- Died: 17 February 1978; 23, Gora Chand Road, Kolkata, West Bengal, India
- Occupation: Business
- Known for: Chief Patron of Nabarabi & Asantakali
- Children: 1 daughter and 4 sons
- Website: www.nabarabi.com

Padma Charan Parija commonly known as Patiram Parija (died 17 February 1978) was an industrialist and businessman of Eastern India. He had the sole distributorship of the Ananda Bazar Group of publications in Kolkata (formerly Calcutta), India during 1960s. He was the chief patron of Nabarabi, a literary magazine in Odia language. Under his stewardship, Nabarabi started publication in July 1970 from Kolkata (formerly Calcutta) and continued till December 1976.
