= Nabarabi =

Odia language literary magazine

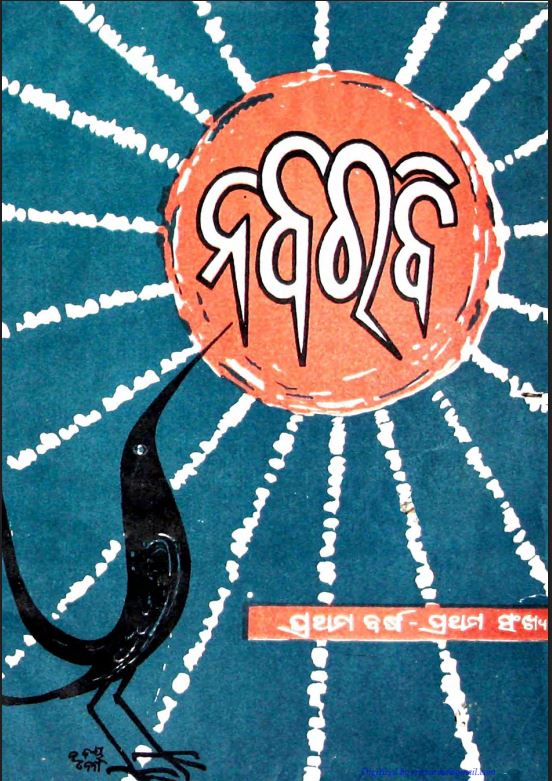
- Nabarabi Cover Page of July 1970 (First Issue)
- Founder: Patiram Parija
- Editor: Sandhya Mohanty
- Language: Odia
- Headquarters: Bhubaneswar, Odisha
- Website: Official website

Nabarabi (Odia: ନବରବି) is an Odia language literary magazine of 1970s getting published from Kolkata, India. The chief patron of Nabarabi was Patiram Parija.

== History ==
Its publication started in July 1970 and continued until December 1976 as a monthly magazine with Rabindra Kumar Parija as its editor. After the death of its patron Patiram Parija, the publication of the magazine was stopped. In 1996, it was revived by Sandhya Mohanty, granddaughter of Late Patiram Parija, with support of her husband Sarbeswar Mohanty from Bhubaneswar, Odisha. Currently the magazine is getting published irregularly with Sandhya Mohanty as its Editor.
