= Suheh Hussain =

Indian cricketer (born 1991)

Personal information
- Full name: Suhel Soriful Hussain
- Born: 13 January 1991 (age 35); Itanagar, Arunachal Pradesh
- Source: Cricinfo, 24 February 2019

Suheh Hussain (born 13 January 1991) is an Indian cricketer. He made his Twenty20 debut for Arunachal Pradesh in the 2018–19 Syed Mushtaq Ali Trophy on 24 February 2019.
