= Ankit Singh =

Indian cricketer (born 1995)

Personal information
- Full name: Ankit Singh
- Born: 15 October 1995 (age 31)
- Batting: Right-handed
- Bowling: Right-arm leg-spin
- Role: All-rounder
- Source: ESPNcricinfo, 8 March 2019

Ankit Singh (born 15 October 1995) is an Indian cricketer. He made his Twenty20 debut for Arunachal Pradesh in the 2018–19 Syed Mushtaq Ali Trophy on 27 February 2019.
