= Somnath Soni =

Indian cricketer (born 1998)

Personal information
- Full name: Somnath Soni
- Born: 20 June 1998 (age 28); Lucknow, India
- Source: Cricinfo, 2 March 2019

Somnath Soni (born 20 June 1998) is an Indian cricketer. He made his Twenty20 debut for Arunachal Pradesh in the 2018–19 Syed Mushtaq Ali Trophy on 2 March 2019.
