= Roshan Alam =

Indian cricketer (born 1995)

Personal information
- Full name: Roshan Munna Alam
- Born: 20 April 1995 (age 31); Golaghat, Assam, India
- Batting: Right-handed
- Bowling: Slow left-arm orthodox
- Role: Bowler

Domestic team information
- Years: Team
- 2011/12–present: Assam
- Source: Cricinfo, 25 September 2019

Roshan Alam (born 20 April 1995) is an Indian cricketer who plays first-class cricket for Assam. Alam made his first-class debut for Assam on 17 November 2011 in the 2011-12 Ranji Trophy against Hyderabad in Guwahati. He made his List A debut on 25 September 2019, for Assam in the 2019–20 Vijay Hazare Trophy. He made his Twenty20 debut on 12 November 2019, in the 2019–20 Syed Mushtaq Ali Trophy.
