= Tata Digwadih Stadium =

Sports stadium in Dhanbad, Jharkhand, India

- Interactive map of Tata Digwadih Stadium

Ground information
- Location: Dhanbad, Jharkhand
- Coordinates: 23.708°N 86.413°E
- Capacity: n/a

International information
- Only WODI: 26 February 2004: India v West Indies

Tata Digwadih Stadium is a sports stadium in Dhanbad, Jharkhand. The stadium is one of three cricket venues in the city besides Jealgora Stadium and Railway Stadium. The stadium has capacity of 10,000 person and has got day-night facilities to host matches.

The ground hosted a Women's One Day International match when India women's national cricket team played against West Indies women's cricket team in February 2004 as India won by 105 runs.
