= Subham Nayak =

Indian cricketer (born 1998)

Personal information
- Born: 25 October 1998 (age 28); Bhadrak, Odisha, India
- Source: Cricinfo, 24 October 2017

Subham Nayak (born 25 October 1998) is an Indian cricketer. He made his first-class debut for Odisha in the 2017–18 Ranji Trophy on 24 October 2017. He made his Twenty20 debut for Odisha in the 2018–19 Syed Mushtaq Ali Trophy on 2 March 2019.
