= Latika Kumari =

Indian cricketer (born 1992)

Personal information
- Full name: Latika Kumari
- Born: 5 January 1982 (age 44); Delhi, India
- Batting: Right-handed
- Bowling: Right-arm medium

International information
- National side: India
- T20I debut (cap 17): 11 June 2009 v England
- Last T20I: 15 July 2015 v New Zealand

Career statistics
Competition	WT20I
Matches	6
Runs scored	61
Batting average	10.16
100s/50s	0/0
Top score	36
Balls bowled	-
Wickets	-
Bowling average	-
5 wickets in innings	-
10 wickets in match	-
Best bowling	-
Catches/stumpings	2/-
- Source: ESPNcricinfo, 19 April 2020

Latika Kumari (born 5 January 1992) is an Indian cricketer. She is a right-handed batter and her bowling style is right-arm medium. She has been a part of major teams like Delhi Women, India B Women, India Blue Women, and India Women. Kumari made her T20I debut in England Women v. India Women at Taunton on 11 June 2009. Her last T20I was India Women v. New Zealand Women at Bengaluru on 15 July 2015.

In 2009, Kumari was included in the squad of fifteen along with two new inclusions: Babita Mandlik and offspinner Diana David.
