= Nehru Smarak Stadium =

Cricket ground Bhagalpur, Bihar, India

Coordinates: 25.2528°N 86.9969°E

- Location: Bhagalpur, Bihar, India
- Establishment: 1972
- Capacity: 1,000
- Owner: n/a
- Architect: n/a
- Operator: Bihar Cricket Association
- Tenants: Bihar cricket team
- End names
- n/a
- As of 17 August 2015; Source: Ground Info

Nehru Smarak Stadium is a cricket ground Bhagalpur, Bihar. The ground hosted two Ranji matches for the Bihar cricket team in 1972 and 1973 where Odisha cricket team and Assam cricket team were the visiting teams.

In the 2013–14 season, the ground hosted 11 women's T20 games, including the final, as part of Plate Group A of the Inter-State Women's Twenty20 competition.
