= Abhimanyu Cricket Academy =

Cricket stadium

Coordinates: 30°38′55″N 78°06′22″E

- Interactive map of Abhimanyu Cricket Academy
- Full name: Abhimanyu Cricket Academy
- Former names: National School of Cricket Ground
- Location: Dehradun, Uttarakhand
- Owner: National School of Cricket
- Operator: National School of Cricket
- Capacity: 5,000

Construction
- Groundbreaking: 2008
- Built: 2007
- Opened: 2008

Tenants
- Uttarakhand cricket team Red Bull Campus Cricket

Website
- ESPNcricinfo

Abhimanyu Cricket Academy is a multi-purpose stadium in Dehradun, Uttarakhand. The ground is mainly used for organizing matches of football, cricket and other sports.

The academy is named after Bengal cricket team's former captain and current India A captain Abhimanyu Easwaran's father RP Easwaran inspired by the character Abhimanyu in the Hindu epic Mahabharata. He incidentally used the same name for his son. RP Easwaran bought a piece of land in Dehradun in 2005 and started to build the stadium.

The stadium was established in 2007 when they hosted a match of Women's Domestic match between Uttar Pradesh Women and Railways Women. The ground has floodlights so that the stadium can host day-night matches. It is made considering all norms of BCCI so that Ranji Trophy matches can be played.

The venue was also host of 2015/16 Red Bull Campus Cricket World Finals where teams from India, South Africa, Australia, England, Sri Lanka, Pakistan, Bangladesh and United Arab Emirates were involved in a Twenty20 competition.
