= Rohan Kadam =

Indian cricketer (born 1994)

Personal information
- Full name: Rohan Pramod Kadam
- Born: 5 July 1994 (age 32); Dharwad, Karnataka, India
- Batting: Left-handed
- Bowling: Legbreak Googly
- Role: Batter

Domestic team information
- Years: Team
- 2017–present: Karnataka
- Source: Cricinfo, 9 June 2022

Rohan Pramod Kadam (born 5 July 1994) is an Indian cricketer who represents Karnataka in domestic cricket. He made his List A debut for Karnataka in the 2016–17 Vijay Hazare Trophy on 6 March 2017. He made his Twenty20 debut for Karnataka in the 2018–19 Syed Mushtaq Ali Trophy on 21 February 2019. He was the leading run-scorer in the 2018–19 Syed Mushtaq Ali Trophy, with 536 runs in twelve matches. He made his first-class debut on 3 January 2020, for Karnataka in the 2019–20 Ranji Trophy.
