= Sarika Koli =

Indian cricketer (born 1994)

Sarika Koli (born 5 December 1994 in Mumbai, Maharashtra) is an Indian cricketer in India A cricket team and India Green Women. She created her highest score in UWCL Women's T20 Tournament is 160 runs in 67 balls. she is captain of Indian Railways Girls Team. she led the Sikkim Female cricket team as captain in Senior Women one day Cricket Tournament 2021.
