= Padam Limboo =

Indian cricketer (born 1996)

Personal information
- Full name: Padam Bahadur Limboo
- Born: 10 January 1996 (age 30); Yangang, Sikkim
- Source: ESPNcricinfo, 20 September 2018

Padam Limboo (born 10 January 1996) is an Indian cricketer. He made his List A debut for Sikkim in the 2018–19 Vijay Hazare Trophy on 20 September 2018. He made his first-class debut for Sikkim in the 2018–19 Ranji Trophy on 1 November 2018. He made his Twenty20 debut on 9 November 2019, for Sikkim in the 2019–20 Syed Mushtaq Ali Trophy.
