= DRIEMS Ground =

Cricket ground

Coordinates: 20°33′03″N 85°59′57″E

Dhaneswar Rath Institute of Engineering and Management Sciences Ground
Ground information
- Location: Tangi, Cuttack, Odisha, India
- Owner: Government of Odisha
- Operator: Odisha Cricket Association
- Tenants: Odisha Cricket Team

International information
- First WODI: 01 February 2013: New Zealand v South Africa
- Last WODI: 05 February 2013: Australia v New Zealand
- As of 07 January 2015; Source: Dhaneswar Rath Institute of Engineering and Management Sciences Ground, CricketArchive

Dhaneswar Rath Institute of Engineering and Management Sciences Ground is located in the city of Cuttack, Odisha, India.

It is currently used by the Board of Control for Cricket in India and Odisha Cricket Association for Women's One Day Internationals and First Class matches. The stadium is currently used as the home ground for India national women's cricket team and two Indian domestic cricket team, Odisha and East Zone. Dhaneswar Rath Institute of Engineering and Management Sciences Ground has hosted 3 ODI matches with the host team India of 2013 Women's Cricket World Cup.
