= Paras Sharma =

Indian cricketer (born 1995)

Personal information
- Full name: Paras Ashok Sharma
- Born: 4 December 1995 (age 30); Jammu, India
- Source: Cricinfo, 11 October 2015

Paras Sharma (born 4 December 1995) is an Indian first-class cricketer who plays for Jammu & Kashmir.
