= Pawandeep Singh =

Indian cricketer (born 1992)

Personal information
- Born: 5 July 1992 (age 34); Raipur
- Batting: Right handed
- Bowling: Right arm medium

Domestic team information
- Years: Team
- 2018–19: Chhattisgarh
- Source: Cricinfo, 2 March 2019

Pawandeep Singh (born 5 July 1992) is an Indian cricketer. He made his Twenty20 debut for Chhattisgarh in the 2018–19 Syed Mushtaq Ali Trophy on 2 March 2019.
