= Preet Kamal Singh =

Indian cricketer (born 1990)

Personal information
- Full name: Preet Kamal Singh
- Born: 14 September 1990 (age 35); Patiala, Punjab
- Batting: Right-handed
- Bowling: Off break
- Role: Batter

Domestic team information
- Years: Team
- 2019/20: Chandigarh
- Source: CricketArchive (subscription required), 25 November 2023

Preet Kamal Singh (born 14 September 1990) is an Indian cricketer who made his List A debut on 1 October 2019, for Chandigarh in the 2019–20 Vijay Hazare Trophy. He played in seven matches that season which remain his only appearances in senior cricket.
