= Rajib Saha =

Indian cricketer (born 1984)

Personal information
- Full name: Rajib Haradhan Saha
- Born: 23 July 1984 (age 42); Agartala, Tripura
- Source: Cricinfo, 28 September 2018

Rajib Saha (born 23 July 1984) is an Indian cricketer. He has played first-class and List A cricket for Tripura since the 2002–03 season.
