= Sharun Kumar =

Indian cricketer (born 1998)

Personal information
- Full name: Sharun Kumar
- Born: 22 July 1998 (age 28)
- Source: Cricinfo, 9 October 2018

Sharun Kumar (born 22 July 1998) is an Indian cricketer. He made his List A debut for Tamil Nadu in the 2018–19 Vijay Hazare Trophy on 9 October 2018.
