= Abhishek Tiwari =

Indian cricketer (born 1989)

Personal information
- Full name: Abhishek Kumar Tiwari
- Born: 7 December 1988 (age 37); Allahabad, Uttar Pradesh, India
- Source: ESPNcricinfo, 19 September 2018

Abhishek Tiwari (born 7 December 1988) is an Indian cricketer. He made his List A debut for Services in the 2018–19 Vijay Hazare Trophy on 19 September 2018.
