= Sarbeswar Mohanty (civil servant) =

Indian Administrative Service officer (1944–2021)

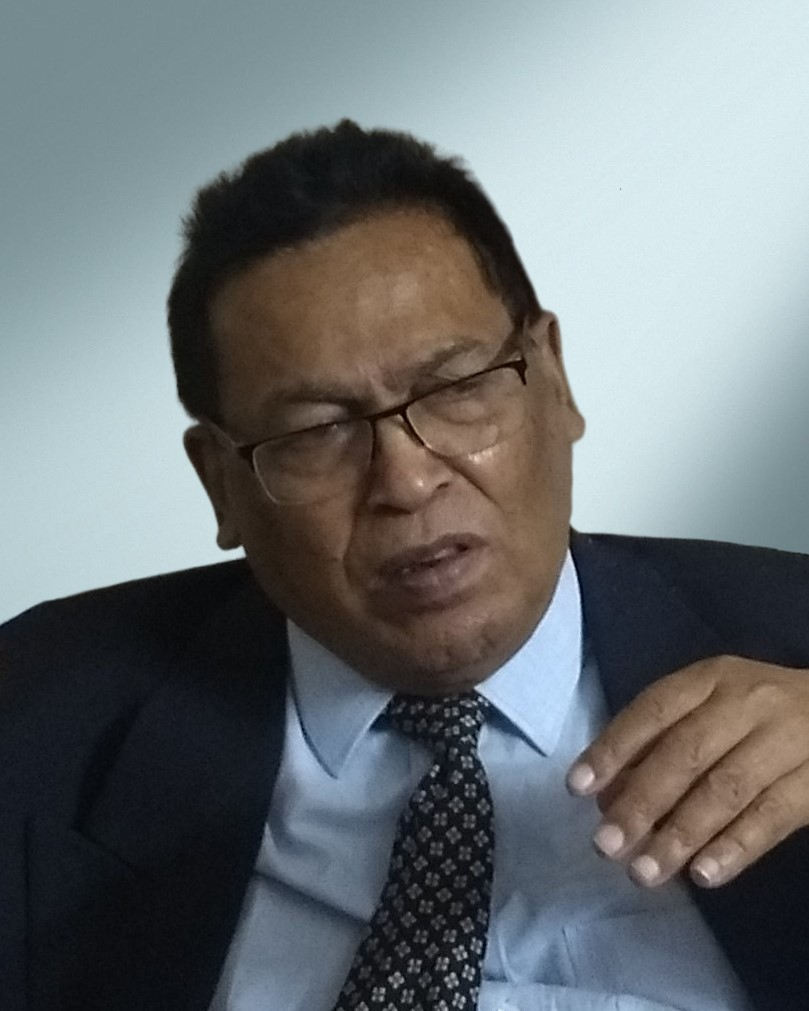
- Mohanty addressing a conference

Secretary Labour & Employment Dept., Government of Odisha, India
- In office 8 March 2004 – 30 June 2004
- Preceded by: A. K. Tripathy
- Succeeded by: Livinus Kindo

Personal details
- Born: Sarbeswar Mohanty; 1 July 1944 Basudevpur, Bhadrak, Odisha
- Died: 16 May 2021 (aged 76) Bhubaneswar
- Spouse: Sandhya Mohanty
- Children: 1 Daughter and 2 Sons
- Education: Utkal University, Lal Bahadur Shastri National Academy of Administration
- Occupation: IAS officer
- Profession: Civil servant

Sarbeswar Mohanty (1 July 1944 – 16 May 2021) was an Indian Administrative Service officer of Odisha cadre. He had served as Commissioner cum Secretary, Labour & Employment Department, Government of Odisha, Secretary, Odisha Legislative Assembly, and Director, Information & Public Relations Department, Government of Odisha. He had served as District Magistrate of 3 different districts Jagatsinghpur, Khordha, and Kendrapara of the state of Odisha, India. National Human Rights Commission of India placed on record its appreciation of the sincerity, dedication and commitment displayed by him as the Collector of Jagatsinghpur district in organising and executing relief and rehabilitation work after the super cyclone that struck Odisha in October 1999.

He was the President of the governing bodies of Alaka Mahavidyalaya. and Loknath Mohavidyalaya He also worked as managing editor of Odia magazine Nabarabi.
