= Chemplast Cricket Ground =

Cricket ground on the campus of IIT Madras

Coordinates: 12.98824°N 80.22641°E

Indian Institute of Technology Chemplast Ground
- Chemplast Ground
- Interactive map of Indian Institute of Technology Chemplast Ground

Ground information
- Location: IIT Madras, Chennai, Tamil Nadu
- Country: India
- Establishment: 1998
- Capacity: n/a

International information
- First women's ODI: 16 December 2003: India v New Zealand
- Last women's ODI: 5 March 2007: India v England

Team information
Tamil Nadu cricket team	(1998-present)
- As of 9 December 2019; Source: Ground profile

The Chemplast Cricket Ground or Indian Institute of Technology Chemplast Ground is a cricket ground within the IIT Madras campus, in Velachery, Chennai.

The ground is an important cricket venue in Chennai, and used for practice sessions by the Indian national cricket team. Chemplast is described by cricketer Sachin Tendulkar as the most scenic in the country. It is set amongst lush greenery and the backdrop of the Guindy National Park.

The ground has hosted eight Women's cricket ODI. The first match record at the ground was in 2003 India Women's and New Zealand Women's.
