= Kamsha Yangfo =

Indian cricketer (born 1992)

Personal information
- Full name: Kamsha Yangfo
- Born: 16 November 1992 (age 33)
- Batting: Right handed
- Role: Wicketkeeper

Domestic team information
- Years: Team
- 2018–19: Arunachal Pradesh
- Source: ESPNcricinfo, 19 September 2018

Kamsha Yangfo (born 16 November 1992) is an Indian cricketer.

He made his List A debut for Arunachal Pradesh in the 2018–19 Vijay Hazare Trophy on 19 September 2018. He made his first-class debut for Arunachal Pradesh in the 2018–19 Ranji Trophy on 1 November 2018. He made his Twenty20 debut for Arunachal Pradesh in the 2018–19 Syed Mushtaq Ali Trophy on 21 February 2019. He was the captain of Arunachal Pradesh for the 2018–19 season of the Vijay Hazare Trophy and the Ranji Trophy.
