= Arun Chaprana =

Indian cricketer (born 1994)

Personal information
- Born: 5 January 1994 (age 32); Faridabad, Haryana, India
- Batting: Right-handed
- Bowling: Right arm medium
- Source: ESPNcricinfo, 21 September 2018

Arun Chaprana (born 5 January 1994) is an Indian cricketer. He made his List A debut for Haryana in the 2018–19 Vijay Hazare Trophy on 21 September 2018. He made his Twenty20 debut for Haryana in the 2018–19 Syed Mushtaq Ali Trophy on 21 February 2019.
