= Jaymin Chauhan =

Indian cricketer (born 1991)

Personal information
- Full name: Jaymin Chauhan
- Born: 14 November 1991 (age 34)
- Source: ESPNcricinfo, 24 September 2018

Jaymin Chauhan (born 14 November 1991) is an Indian cricketer. He made his List A debut for Gujarat in the 2018–19 Vijay Hazare Trophy on 24 September 2018.
