= Lalhruaizela =

Indian cricketer (born 1996)

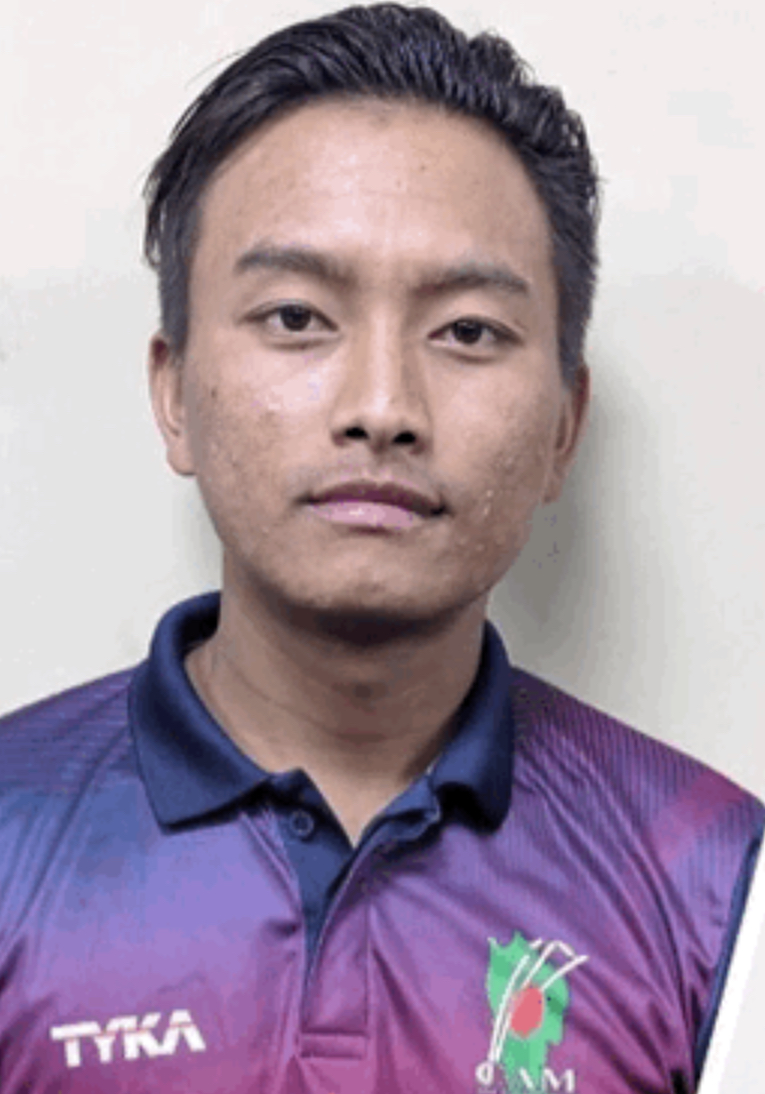

Personal information
- Born: 30 December 1996 (age 29); Durtlang, Aizawl, Mizoram
- Batting: Right-handed
- Bowling: Right-arm spin
- Role: Opening batsman
- Source: ESPNcricinfo, 3 October 2019

Lalhruaizela (born 30 December 1996) is an Indian cricketer.

== Career ==
He made his first-class debut on 12 November 2018, for Mizoram in the 2018–19 Ranji Trophy. He made his Twenty20 debut on 21 February 2019, for Mizoram, in the 2018–19 Syed Mushtaq Ali Trophy. He made his List A debut on 10 October 2019, for Mizoram in the 2019–20 Vijay Hazare Trophy.
