= Sarbeswar Mohanty (cricketer) =

Indian cricketer (born 1995)

Personal information
- Born: 23 May 1995 (age 31); Balasore, Odisha, India
- Source: Cricinfo, 21 February 2019

Sarbeswar Mohanty (born 23 May 1995) is an Indian cricketer. He made his Twenty20 debut for Odisha in the 2018–19 Syed Mushtaq Ali Trophy on 21 February 2019.
