= Ranjeev Sharma =

Indian cricketer (born 1973)

Personal information
- Born: 3 January 1973 (age 53); Jalandhar, Punjab, India
- Batting: Right-handed
- Bowling: Right-arm leg break
- Role: Umpire

Umpiring information
- Source: Cricinfo, 10 January 2021

Ranjeev Sharma (born 3 January 1973) is an Indian former cricketer. He played in two first-class and two List A matches for Punjab in the 1994/95 season. He is now an umpire and stood in a match in the 2020–21 Syed Mushtaq Ali Trophy.

== See also ==
- List of Punjab cricketers (India)
