= Samarth Seth =

Indian cricketer (born 1999)

Personal information
- Full name: Samarth Seth
- Born: 14 September 1999 (age 27); Delhi
- Source: Cricinfo, 19 September 2018

Samarth Seth (born 14 September 1999) is an Indian cricketer.

== Early life ==
Seth represented Delhi in the Under-16 and Under-19 level. He also represented Delhi in the Under-14 level as a medium pacer.

== Career ==
Seth made his List A debut for Arunachal Pradesh in the 2018–19 Vijay Hazare Trophy on 19 September 2018, scoring a century. He was the leading run-scorer for Arunachal Pradesh in the 2018–19 Vijay Hazare Trophy, with 345 runs in seven matches. He made his first-class debut for Arunachal Pradesh in the 2018–19 Ranji Trophy on 1 November 2018. He made his Twenty20 debut for Arunachal Pradesh in the 2018–19 Syed Mushtaq Ali Trophy on 21 February 2019.

In 2021, Seth played for Barnard Castle Cricket Club in England.
