= Amit Sinha =

Indian cricketer (born 1988)

Personal information
- Full name: Amit Sumanta Sinha
- Born: 26 November 1988 (age 37); Nagaon, Assam, India
- Batting: Right-handed
- Bowling: Legbreak
- Role: Batsman

Domestic team information
- Years: Team
- 2007–present: Assam
- Source: ESPNcricinfo, 30 August 2016

Amit Sinha (born 26 November 1988) is an Indian cricketer who plays domestic cricket for Assam. He is a right-handed middle order batsman. Sinha made his List A debut for Assam on 19 February 2007 against Tripura at Cuttack in the 2006–07 Ranji One-Day Trophy. In December 2009, he made his first-class debut against Tripura at Guwahati in a Ranji Trophy match.
