= Prayas Ray Barman =

Indian cricketer (born 2002)

Personal information
- Full name: Prayas Ray Barman
- Born: 25 October 2002 (age 24); Durgapur, West Bengal, India
- Height: 6 ft 1 in (1.85 m)
- Batting: Right-handed
- Bowling: Leg break
- Role: Bowler

Domestic team information
- Years: Team
- 2018–present: Bengal
- 2019: Royal Challengers Bengaluru

Career statistics
Competition	List A	Twenty20
Matches	9	9
Runs scored	47	42
Batting average	11.75	8.40
100s/50s	0/0	0/0
Top score	25*	19
Balls bowled	341	150
Wickets	11	7
Bowling average	23.00	30.00
5 wickets in innings	0	0
10 wickets in match	0	0
Best bowling	4/20	4/14
Catches/stumpings	1/–	0/–
- Source: Cricinfo, 27 April 2025

Prayas Ray Barman (born 25 October 2002) is an Indian cricketer. He made his List A debut for Bengal in the 2018–19 Vijay Hazare Trophy on 20 September 2018. He was the leading wicket-taker for Bengal in the 2018–19 Vijay Hazare Trophy, with eleven dismissals in nine matches.

In December 2018, he was bought by the Royal Challengers Bangalore in the player auction for the 2019 Indian Premier League (IPL) for 1.5 crores. He made his Twenty20 debut for Bengal in the 2018–19 Syed Mushtaq Ali Trophy on 21 February 2019. On 31 March 2019, Barman made his debut for Royal Challengers Bangalore in the IPL against Sunrisers Hyderabad, becoming the youngest player to debut in the IPL at that time. At 16 years and 157 days, Barman broke the previous record held by Afghanistan spinner Mujeeb Ur Rahman, who had debuted for Kings XI Punjab at 17 years and 11 days in 2018. The record was officially confirmed by Guinness World Records. In that debut match, played at Rajiv Gandhi International Stadium in Hyderabad, Barman bowled four overs for 56 runs without taking a wicket as RCB faced David Warner and Jonny Bairstow's opening partnership of 185 runs, the highest first-wicket partnership in IPL history at the time. With the bat, he contributed 19 runs off 24 balls and added a 51-run seventh-wicket stand with Colin de Grandhomme. The record stood until 19 April 2025, when Vaibhav Suryavanshi debuted for Rajasthan Royals at age 14. He was released by the Royal Challengers Bangalore ahead of the 2020 IPL auction.
