= Sumit Kumar =

Indian cricketer

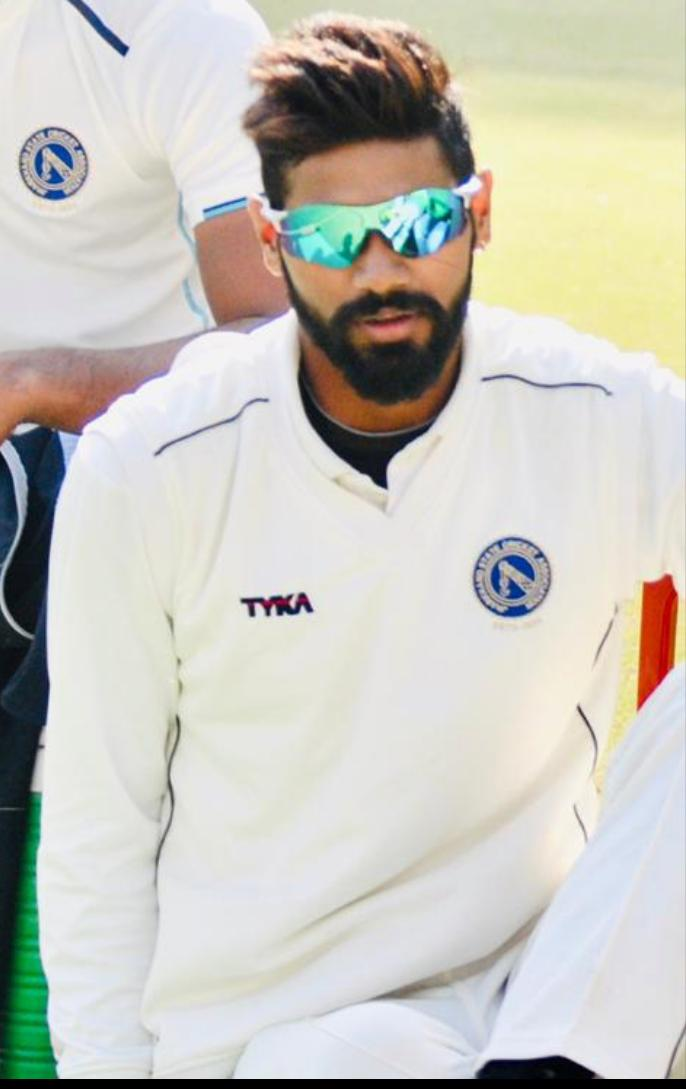

Personal information
- Born: 30 December 1995 (age 30); Bokaro, Jharkhand, India
- Batting: Right-handed
- Bowling: Right-arm offbreak
- Role: Wicket-keeper batsman

Domestic team information
- Years: Team
- 2015–: Jharkhand
- 2015–2018: East Zone
- FC debut: 13 January 2015 Jharkhand v Himachal Pradesh
- T20 debut: 5 February 2018 Jharkhand v Vidarbha
- Source: Cricinfo, 27 January 2023

Sumit Kumar (born 30 December 1995) is an Indian cricketer, wicket-keeper-batsman and a member of the Jharkhand cricket team.

== Career ==
Kumar was selected to play for Jharkhand U-16 team. He made his Twenty20 debut on 3 January 2016 in the 2015–16 Syed Mushtaq Ali Trophy and went on to represent the same team for the next 2 years. He made his List A debut for Jharkhand in the 2017–18 Vijay Hazare Trophy on 5 February 2018. He was selected to play for the Jharkhand U-19 team which he represented thrice also scoring an unbeaten 203 against Assam. In October 2014 he was selected to be the vice captain for the Jharkhand Cooch Behar U19 Trophy. He was later on was also selected to attend the U19 and the U23 JSCA camp. He was the leading run-scorer for Jharkhand in the 2016–17 C.K.Nayudu trophy, with 535 runs in four matches where he also hit a high score of 178 in 240 balls. He has represented Jharkhand in various tournaments Vijay hazare trophy in 2015–16,2016–17 and 2018-19 and Vinoo Mankad trophy in 2012-13 & 2013–14. He is a first class Ranji Trophy player from 2015 till date. He currently has a job at RBI and represents the RBI All India Team.
