= Treyaksh Bali =

Indian cricketer (born 2000)

Personal information
- Born: 18 May 2000 (age 26); Chandigarh, India
- Source: Cricinfo, 30 September 2018

Treyaksh Bali (born 18 May 2000) is an Indian cricketer. He made his List A debut for Haryana in the 2018–19 Vijay Hazare Trophy on 30 September 2018. He made his Twenty20 debut for Haryana in the 2018–19 Syed Mushtaq Ali Trophy on 21 February 2019.
