= Harsh Singh (cricketer) =

Indian cricketer (born 1995)

Personal information
- Full name: Harsh Vikram Singh
- Born: 20 September 1995 (age 31); Surat, Gujarat, India

Domestic team information
- Years: Team
- 2018-present: Bihar
- Source: ESPNcricinfo, 20 November 2018

Harsh Vikram Singh (born 20 September 1995) is an Indian cricketer. He made his first-class debut for Bihar in the 2018–19 Ranji Trophy on 20 November 2018. He made his Twenty20 debut on 14 November 2019, for Bihar in the 2019–20 Syed Mushtaq Ali Trophy.
