= Omar Alam =

Indian cricketer (born 1985)

Personal information
- Born: 7 March 1985 (age 41); Srinagar, India
- Source: ESPNcricinfo, 10 January 2016

Omar Alam (born 7 March 1985) is an Indian cricketer who plays for Jammu & Kashmir. He made his Twenty20 debut on 6 January 2016 in the 2015–16 Syed Mushtaq Ali Trophy. He made his List A debut for Jammu & Kashmir in the 2018–19 Vijay Hazare Trophy on 7 October 2018.
