= Neelam Obi =

Indian cricketer (born 1993)

Personal information
- Full name: Neelam Obi
- Born: 16 January 1993 (age 33); Arunachal Pradesh
- Batting: Right handed
- Bowling: Legbreak googly

Domestic team information
- Years: Team
- 2018–19: Arunachal Pradesh
- Source: ESPNcricinfo, 1 November 2018

Neelam Obi (born 16 January 1993) is an Indian cricketer. He made his first-class debut for Arunachal Pradesh in the 2018–19 Ranji Trophy on 1 November 2018. He made his Twenty20 debut for Arunachal Pradesh in the 2018–19 Syed Mushtaq Ali Trophy on 21 February 2019. He made his List A debut on 5 October 2019, for Arunachal Pradesh in the 2019–20 Vijay Hazare Trophy.
