= Arunachal Pradesh cricket team =

Indian cricket team

Personnel
- Captain: Neelam Obi (FC); Kamsha Yangfo (LA); Techi Neri (T20)
- Coach: Rakesh Sharma
- Owner: Arunachal Cricket Association

Team information
- Founded: 2018

History
- First-class debut: Meghalaya in 2018 at Meghalaya Cricket Association Cricket Ground, Shillong
- Ranji Trophy wins: 0
- Vijay Hazare Trophy wins: 0
- Syed Mushtaq Ali Trophy wins: 0
- Official website: arunachalcricket.in

The Arunachal Pradesh cricket team represents the state of Arunachal Pradesh in Indian domestic cricket competitions. In July 2018, the Board of Control for Cricket in India (BCCI) named the team as one of the nine new sides that would compete in domestic tournaments for the 2018–19 season, including the Ranji Trophy and the Vijay Hazare Trophy. However, prior to the start of the tournament, the team did not have a ground to play first-class cricket on. Ahead of the 2018–19 season, Gursharan Singh was appointed as the team's coach.

In September 2018, they won their opening fixture of the 2018–19 Vijay Hazare Trophy, beating Mizoram by four wickets. In their first season in the Vijay Hazare Trophy, they finished in seventh place in the Plate Group, with two wins and five defeats from their eight matches. One match also finished as a no result. Samarth Seth finished as the leading run-scorer, with 345 runs, and Sandeep Kumar Thakur was the leading wicket-taker for the team, with eight dismissals.

In November 2018, in their opening match of the 2018–19 Ranji Trophy, they lost to Meghalaya by seven wickets. They finished the 2018–19 tournament eighth in the table, with no wins from their eight matches.

In March 2019, Arunachal Pradesh finished seventh in Group D of the 2018–19 Syed Mushtaq Ali Trophy, with one win from their seven matches. Samarth Seth was the leading run-scorer for the team in the tournament, with 221 runs, and Akhilesh Sahani was the leading wicket-taker, with eleven dismissals.

== Notable Players ==
- Techi Doria (2018-present)
- Akhilesh Sahani (2018-2023)
- Rahul Dalal (2019-2023)

== Squad ==
Name	Birth date	Batting Style	Bowling Style	Notes
Batsmen
Techi Doria	2 March 1994 (age 32)	Right-handed	Right-arm medium	
Neelam Obi	16 January 1993 (age 33)	Right-handed	Right-arm leg break	First-class Captain
Licha Jhon	12 December 1997 (age 28)	Right-handed		
Techi Sania	13 November 2001 (age 24)	Right-handed	Right-arm medium	
Aditya Mukesh	20 February 2007 (age 19)	Right-handed	Right-arm leg break	
Vidush Arora	19 January 1997 (age 29)	Right-handed	Right-arm off break	
Yugvinder Saroha	20 May 2000 (age 26)	Right-handed	Right-arm off break	
Nabam Kama	24 November 2001 (age 24)	Right-handed	Right-arm off break	
Salil Malhotra	2 June 1997 (age 29)	Right-handed	Right-arm off break	
All-rounders
Techi Neri	10 May 1994 (age 32)	Right-handed	Right-arm off break	Twenty20 Captain
Myendung Singpho	23 October 1996 (age 30)	Right-handed	Right-arm leg break	
Nabam Tempol	25 September 1994 (age 32)	Right-handed	Right-arm medium	
Nabam Dol	1 January 2001 (age 25)	Left-handed	Right-arm medium	
Suryansh Singh	1 July 2007 (age 19)	Right-handed	Right-arm medium	
Wicket-keepers
Kamsha Yangfo	16 November 1992 (age 33)	Right-handed		List A Captain
Biki Kumar	10 June 2001 (age 25)	Right-handed		
Spin bowler
TNR Mohit	23 July 2001 (age 25)	Right-handed	Right-arm off break	
Nabam Josh	15 January 1998 (age 28)	Right-handed	Right-arm off break	
Dheeraj Antin	6 January 2000 (age 26)	Right-handed	Right-arm off break	
Likha Sonia	30 May 1998 (age 28)	Right-handed	Right-arm off break	
Pace bowlers
Yab Niya	18 October 1994 (age 32)	Right-handed	Right-arm medium-fast	
Mibom Mosu	26 November 2002 (age 23)	Right-handed	Right-arm medium	
Penjor Mangal	21 March 1993 (age 33)	Right-handed	Right-arm medium	
Yorjum Sera	23 March 2002 (age 24)	Left-handed	Left-arm medium	
Tanish Patkar	15 November 2001 (age 24)	Right-handed	Right-arm medium	

Updated as on 2 November 2026
