= 2020–21 Vijay Hazare Trophy Plate Group =

Cricket tournament

- Dates: 21 February – 1 March 2021
- Administrator(s): BCCI
- Cricket format: List A cricket
- Tournament format(s): Round-robin
- Participants: 8

The 2020–21 Vijay Hazare Trophy was the 19th season of the Vijay Hazare Trophy, a List A cricket tournament in India. It was contested by 38 teams, divided into six groups, with eight teams in the Plate Group. Arunachal Pradesh, Assam, Manipur, Meghalaya, Mizoram, Nagaland, Sikkim and Uttarakhand were placed in the Plate Group, with all the matches taking place in Tamil Nadu. Uttarakhand won the Plate Group to qualify for the Eliminator match in the tournament.

== Points table ==
Team	Pld	W	L	T	NR	Pts	NRR
Uttarakhand (Q)	5	5	0	0	0	20	+3.273
Assam	5	5	0	0	0	20	+1.909
Meghalaya	5	4	1	0	0	16	+1.110
Nagaland	5	4	1	0	0	16	+0.431
Sikkim	5	1	4	0	0	4	–1.137
Arunachal Pradesh	5	0	4	0	1	2	–2.354
Mizoram	5	0	4	0	1	2	–2.418
Manipur	5	0	5	0	0	0	–1.754

- Top team advanced to the Eliminator

== Fixtures ==
=== Round 1 ===
21 February 2021
Scorecard

Meghalaya; 242/6 (50 overs)	v	Uttarakhand; 243/4 (44.1 overs)
Sanjay Yadav 81 (49); Akash Madhwal 2/40 (10 overs)		Jay Bista 141 (119); Abhay Negi 2/36 (9 overs)

Uttarakhand won by 6 wickets
India Cement Limited Guru Nanak College Ground, Chennai
Umpires: KR Vasuki and Manish Jain

- Uttarakhand won the toss and elected to field.
- Akash Madhwal, Kamal Singh (Uttarakhand), Rohit Shah and Yogesh Tiwari (Meghalaya) all made their List A debuts.

21 February 2021
Scorecard

Manipur; 108/6 (28 overs)	v	Assam; 119/0 (15.4 overs)
Kangabam Singh 25* (24); Rajjakuddin Ahmed 2/11 (5 overs)		Pallavkumar Das 75* (53)

Assam won by 10 wickets (VJD method)
VB Nest Cricket Academy, Chennai
Umpires: Ghanasyam Prabhu and Milind Bhatt

- Assam won the toss and elected to field.
- Assam were set a revised target of 117 runs from 15.4 overs due to rain.
- Denish Das, Rajjakuddin Ahmed, Saahil Jain (Assam), Kishan Singha, Narisingh Yadav and Nitesh Sedai (Manipur) all made their List A debuts.

21 February 2021
Scorecard

Nagaland; 310/8 (50 overs)	v	Sikkim; 212 (49.2 overs)
Sedezhalie Rupero 99 (110); Varun Sood 2/34 (10 overs)		Robin Bist 72 (85); Hem Chetri 3/29 (5.2 overs)

Nagaland won by 98 runs
TI Cycles Ground, Chennai
Umpires: Ravi Shankar and Sumit Bansal

- Sikkim won the toss and elected to field.
- Anwesh Sharma, Rajiv Darjee (Sikkim), Hem Chetri, Joshua Ozukum and Khrievitso Kense (Nagaland) all made their List A debuts.

21 February 2021
Scorecard

Arunachal Pradesh; 7/0 (2.4 overs)	v	Mizoram
Techi Doria 3* (6)

No result
Sri Sivasubramaniya Nadar College of Engineering Ground, Chennai
Umpires: Abhijit Bhattacharya and Sabyasachi Sarkar

- Mizoram won the toss and elected to field.
- Rain prevented any further play.
- Lalchhuanliana (Mizoram), Manvan Patel, Nazeeb Saiyed, Rakesh Kumar and Techi Sonam (Arunachal Pradesh) all made their List A debuts.

=== Round 2 ===
23 February 2021
Scorecard

Arunachal Pradesh; 222/7 (50 overs)	v	Assam; 226/5 (36.4 overs)
Rahul Dalal 123* (121); Amlanjyoti Das 2/29 (7 overs)		Sibsankar Roy 60* (79); Rakesh Kumar 4/58 (10 overs)

Assam won by 5 wickets
TI Cycles Ground, Chennai
Umpires: Nikhil Menon and Premdip Chatterjee

- Assam won the toss and elected to field.
- Abhilash Gogoi (Assam) made his List A debut.

23 February 2021
Scorecard

Manipur; 148/9 (50 overs)	v	Uttarakhand; 152/3 (23.1 overs)
Jayanta Sagatpam 32 (68); Mayank Mishra 2/18 (10 overs)		Jay Bista 71 (61); Kishan Singha 2/33 (5 overs)

Uttarakhand won by 7 wickets
Sri Sivasubramaniya Nadar College of Engineering Ground, Chennai
Umpires: Ravi Shankar and Sumit Bansal

- Uttarakhand won the toss and elected to field.

23 February 2021
Scorecard

Nagaland; 347/9 (50 overs)	v	Mizoram; 318/6 (50 overs)
Stuart Binny 80 (56); Lalnunkima Varte 5/64 (10 overs)		Pratik Desai 141 (113); Nagaho Chishi 2/30 (7 overs)

Nagaland won by 29 runs
India Cement Limited Guru Nanak College Ground, Chennai
Umpires: Ghanasyam Prabhu and Milind Bhatt

- Nagaland won the toss and elected to bat.

23 February 2021
Scorecard

Meghalaya; 319/7 (50 overs)	v	Sikkim; 231/9 (50 overs)
Punit Bisht 116 (80); Nitesh Gupta 2/36 (7 overs)		Ashish Thapa 79 (102); Dippu Sangma 2/33 (10 overs)

Meghalaya won by 88 runs
VB Nest Cricket Academy, Chennai
Umpires: Abhijit Bhattacharya and Sabyasachi Sarkar

- Meghalaya won the toss and elected to bat.

=== Round 3 ===
25 February 2021
Scorecard

Assam; 294 (49.5 overs)	v	Nagaland; 210 (45.2 overs)
Sibsankar Roy 106 (123); Khrievitso Kense 4/61 (10 overs)		Chetan Bist 57 (51); Amlanjyoti Das 2/42 (9 overs)

Assam won by 84 runs
Sri Sivasubramaniya Nadar College of Engineering Ground, Chennai
Umpires: KR Vasuki and Manish Jain

- Assam won the toss and elected to bat.

25 February 2021
Scorecard

Arunachal Pradesh; 225/6 (50 overs)	v	Uttarakhand; 226/2 (24.3 overs)
Kamsha Yangfo 58 (100); Samad Fallah 2/53 (10 overs)		Kunal Chandela 78* (51); Akhilesh Sahani 1/40 (8 overs)

Uttarakhand won by 8 wickets
VB Nest Cricket Academy, Chennai
Umpires: Ghanasyam Prabhu and Milind Bhatt

- Arunachal Pradesh won the toss and elected to bat.
- Ankit Manori (Uttarakhand), Indiya Toku and Nabam Tempol(Arunachal Pradesh) all made their List A debuts.

25 February 2021
Scorecard

Mizoram; 236/7 (50 overs)	v	Meghalaya; 237/8 (48 overs)
K. B. Pawan 89* (83); Sanjay Yadav 2/29 (10 overs)		Dippu Sangma 60* (61); G Lalbiakvela 3/36 (9 overs)

Meghalaya won by 2 wickets
TI Cycles Ground, Chennai
Umpires: Abhijit Bhattacharya and Sabyasachi Sarkar

- Mizoram won the toss and elected to bat.
- Moses Ramhlunmawia (Mizoram) made his List A debut.

25 February 2021
Scorecard

Manipur; 162 (40.1 overs)	v	Sikkim; 165/2 (36.1 overs)
Kishan Singha 36 (41); Md Saptulla 3/23 (5 overs)		Robin Bist 85* (84); Langlonyamba Keishangbam 1/8 (2 overs)

Sikkim won by 8 wickets
India Cement Limited Guru Nanak College Ground, Chennai
Umpires: Nikhil Menon and Premdip Chatterjee

- Manipur won the toss and elected to bat.
- Dinesh Dhobi, Md Saptulla (Sikkim) and Ulenyai Khwairakpam (Manipur) all made their List A debuts.

=== Round 4 ===
27 February 2021
Scorecard

Arunachal Pradesh; 153 (50 overs)	v	Meghalaya; 157/2 (28.5 overs)
Akhilesh Sahani 45 (58); Chengkam Sangma 3/21 (5 overs)		Rohit Shah 70* (84); Manvan Patel 2/38 (8 overs)

Meghalaya won by 8 wickets
Sri Sivasubramaniya Nadar College of Engineering Ground, Chennai
Umpires: KR Vasuki and Manish Jain

- Arunachal Pradesh won the toss and elected to bat.
- Vipin Dhaka (Arunachal Pradesh) made his List A debut.

27 February 2021
Scorecard

Nagaland; 257/9 (50 overs)	v	Manipur; 240/9 (50 overs)
Hem Chetri 82* (85); Rex Rajkumar 2/49 (8 overs)		Narisingh Yadav 62 (72); Stuart Binny 3/32 (7 overs)

Nagaland won by 17 runs
VB Nest Cricket Academy, Chennai
Umpires: Nikhil Menon and Premdip Chatterjee

- Manipur won the toss and elected to field.
- Akavi Yeptho, Merenka Jamir (Nagaland), Chingakham Ranjan, Nongthombam Denin and Gelson Singh (Manipur) all made their List A debuts.

27 February 2021
Scorecard

Sikkim; 245 (50 overs)	v	Assam; 249/6 (47.5 overs)
Robin Bist 120 (109); Pritam Das 5/34 (9 overs)		Kunal Saikia 69 (70); Mandup Bhutia 2/39 (9.5 overs)

Assam won by 4 wickets
India Cement Limited Guru Nanak College Ground, Chennai
Umpires: Ravi Shankar and Sumit Bansal

- Sikkim won the toss and elected to bat.

27 February 2021
Scorecard

Mizoram; 117 (38.3 overs)	v	Uttarakhand; 118/2 (10.5 overs)
Taruwar Kohli 62 (96); Dikshanshu Negi 6/21 (5 overs)		Kunal Chandela 58 (30); Moses Ramhlunmawia 1/21 (1.5 overs)

Uttarakhand won by 8 wickets
TI Cycles Ground, Chennai
Umpires: Abhijit Bhattacharya and Sabyasachi Sarkar

- Mizoram won the toss and elected to bat.
- Darremsanga, Jonathan Lalrinchhana and Ricky Lalthlamuana (Mizoram) all made their List A debuts.

=== Round 5 ===
1 March 2021
Scorecard

Uttarakhand; 306/8 (50 overs)	v	Sikkim; 161/6 (50 overs)
Kamal Singh 119 (121); Varun Sood 3/41 (10 overs)		Nilesh Lamichaney 58 (122); Mayank Mishra 2/21 (9 overs)

Uttarakhand won by 145 runs
Sri Sivasubramaniya Nadar College of Engineering Ground, Chennai
Umpires: Nikhil Menon and Premdip Chatterjee

- Sikkim won the toss and elected to field.
- Agrim Tiwari (Uttarakhand) made his List A debut.

1 March 2021
Scorecard

Assam; 342/8 (50 overs)	v	Mizoram; 160 (43.5 overs)
Saahil Jain 86 (47); Pratik Desai 3/63 (10 overs)		Taruwar Kohli 68 (107); Mukhtar Hussain 4/20 (6 overs)

Assam won by 182 runs
India Cement Limited Guru Nanak College Ground, Chennai
Umpires: Ghanasyam Prabhu and Milind Bhatt

- Mizoram won the toss and elected to field.
- Golden Lalchhuanmawia, Rosiamliana Ralte and Vikash Kumar (Mizoram) all made their List A debuts.

1 March 2021
Scorecard

Arunachal Pradesh; 285/7 (50 overs)	v	Nagaland; 287/3 (42.1 overs)
Rahul Dalal 138* (128); Shrikant Mundhe 4/64 (8 overs)		Rongsen Jonathan 113 (100); Neelam Obi 1/18 (3 overs)

Nagaland won by 7 wickets
VB Nest Cricket Academy, Chennai
Umpires: KR Vasuki and Manish Jain

- Arunachal Pradesh won the toss and elected to bat.
- Chopise Hopongkyu, Nzanthung Mozhui (Nagaland), Kumar Nyompu and Techi Kagung (Arunachal Pradesh) all made their List A debuts.

1 March 2021
Scorecard

Meghalaya; 303/8 (50 overs)	v	Manipur; 220 (48.4 overs)
Abhay Negi 56* (30); Kishan Singha 2/38 (10 overs)		Langlonyamba Keishangbam 83 (104); Sanjay Yadav 4/21 (9.4 overs)

Meghalaya won by 83 runs
TI Cycles Ground, Chennai
Umpires: Ravi Shankar and Sumit Bansal

- Meghalaya won the toss and elected to bat.
- Ahsanul Kabir, Bimol Singh and Chongtham Mehul (Manipur) all made their List A debuts.
