= 2020–21 Syed Mushtaq Ali Trophy Plate Group =

Cricket tournament

2019–20 Syed Mushtaq Ali Trophy Plate Group
- Dates: 11 – 19 January 2021
- Administrator(s): BCCI
- Cricket format: Twenty20 cricket
- Tournament format(s): Round-robin
- Participants: 8

The 2020–21 Syed Mushtaq Ali Trophy was the twelfth season of the Syed Mushtaq Ali Trophy, a Twenty20 cricket tournament played in India. It was contested by 38 teams, divided into six groups, with eight teams in the Plate Group. Arunachal Pradesh, Bihar, Chandigarh, Manipur, Meghalaya, Mizoram, Nagaland and Sikkim were placed in the Plate Group, with all the matches taking place in Chennai. Bihar won the Plate Group to qualify for the knockout stage of the tournament.

== Points table ==
Team	Pld	W	L	T	NR	Pts	NRR
Bihar (Q)	5	5	0	0	0	20	+1.161
Chandigarh	5	4	0	0	1	18	+5.738
Nagaland	5	4	0	0	1	18	+3.047
Meghalaya	5	2	3	0	0	12	+1.154
Manipur	5	2	3	0	0	8	–0.560
Sikkim	5	1	4	0	0	4	–2.939
Arunachal Pradesh	5	0	5	0	0	0	–2.393
Mizoram	5	0	5	0	0	0	–4.521

- First placed team advanced to the Knockout Stage

== Fixtures ==
=== Round 1 ===
11 January 2021
Scorecard

Chandigarh	v	Nagaland

Match abandoned
India Cement Limited Guru Nanak College Ground, Chennai
Umpires: Madanagopal Kuppuraj and Rajeev Godara

- No toss.
- No play was possible due to rain.

11 January 2021
Scorecard

Meghalaya; 62 (13 overs)	v	Manipur; 66/4 (12.1 overs)
Dwaraka Ravi Teja 35 (31); Rex Rajkumar 2/7 (3 overs); Bishworjit Konthoujam 2/7 (3 overs)		Narisingh Yadav 33* (31); Akash Choudhary 1/13 (2.1 overs)

Manipur won by 6 wickets
Sri Sivasubramaniya Nadar College of Engineering Ground, Chennai
Umpires: Krishnaraj Srinath and Subrat Das

- Manipur won the toss and elected to field.
- The match was reduced to 13 overs per side due to rain.
- Anish Charak, Dippu Sangma, Yogesh Tiwari (Meghalaya), Karnajit Yumnam, Kishan Singha and Langlonyamba Keishangbam (Manipur) all made their T20 debuts.

11 January 2021
Scorecard

Bihar; 122 (20 overs)	v	Arunachal Pradesh; 93/8 (20 overs)
MD Rahmatullah 24 (22); Manvan Patel 4/20 (4 overs)		Nazeeb Saiyed 23 (19); Ashutosh Aman 3/17 (4 overs)

Bihar won by 18 runs
TI Cycles Ground, Chennai
Umpires: Chirra Ravikanthreddy and Somnath Jha

- Bihar won the toss and elected to bat.
- Amod Yadav, Rahul Kumar, Sachin Kumar, Sakibul Gani, Vikash Ranjan (Bihar), Kumar Nyompu, Manvan Patel, Nazeeb Saiyed, Rakesh Kumar and Takam Tallum (Arunachal Pradesh) all made their T20 debuts.

11 January 2021
Scorecard

Mizoram; 47/3 (5 overs)	v	Sikkim; 50/0 (3.4 overs)
K. B. Pawan 27 (13); Anureet Singh 1/9 (2 overs)		Anureet Singh 28* (12)

Sikkim won by 10 wickets
Sri Ramachandra Medical College Ground, Chennai
Umpires: K Prabhakar Rao and Pashchim Pathak

- Sikkim won the toss and elected to field.
- The match was reduced to 5 overs per side due to rain.
- Hmar Zothanchhunga, Lalchhuanliana (Mizoram) and Mohammad Ronak (Sikkim) all made their T20 debuts.

=== Round 2 ===
13 January 2021
Scorecard

Meghalaya; 230/6 (20 overs)	v	Mizoram; 100/9 (20 overs)
Punit Bisht 146* (51); Lalnunkima Varte 2/45 (4 overs)		K. B. Pawan 33 (33); Aditya Singhania 4/15 (4 overs)

Meghalaya won by 130 runs
India Cement Limited Guru Nanak College Ground, Chennai
Umpires: Mohamad Rafi and Prahlad Rawat

- Mizoram won the toss and elected to field.

13 January 2021
Scorecard

Chandigarh; 178/5 (20 overs)	v	Manipur; 68/8 (20 overs)
Shivam Bhambri 56 (39); Bishworjit Konthoujam 2/33 (4 overs)		Kishan Thokchom 22 (24); Gurinder Singh 3/10 (4 overs)

Chandigarh won by 110 runs
TI Cycles Ground, Chennai
Umpires: Madanagopal Kuppuraj and Rajeev Godara

- Chandigarh won the toss and elected to bat.
- Amrit Lubana and Mandeep Singh (Chandigarh) both made their T20 debuts.

13 January 2021
Scorecard

Sikkim; 110/8 (20 overs)	v	Bihar; 111/2 (19.1 overs)
Varun Sood 28 (33); Ashutosh Aman 4/18 (4 overs)		Mangal Mahrour 55 (46); Anureet Singh 1/20 (4 overs)

Bihar won by 8 wickets
Sri Sivasubramaniya Nadar College of Engineering Ground, Chennai
Umpires: Krishnaraj Srinath and Subrat Das

- Sikkim won the toss and elected to bat.
- Md Saptulla and Rajiv Darjee (Sikkim) both made their T20 debuts.

13 January 2021
Scorecard

Arunachal Pradesh; 145/7 (20 overs)	v	Nagaland; 149/1 (15.5 overs)
Techi Doria 36 (35); Khrievitso Kense 1/19 (4 overs)		Shrikant Mundhe 69* (47); Nazeeb Saiyed 1/28 (2.5 overs)

Nagaland won by 9 wickets
Sri Ramachandra Medical College Ground, Chennai
Umpires: Chirra Ravikanthreddy and Somnath Jha

- Arunachal Pradesh won the toss and elected to bat.
- Hem Chetri, Joshua Ozukum and Khrievitso Kense (Nagaland) all made their T20 debuts.

=== Round 3 ===
15 January 2021
Scorecard

Meghalaya; 89/9 (20 overs)	v	Bihar; 92/4 (16 overs)
Puneet Bisht 16 (12); Anuj Raj 3/15 (4 overs)		Shasheem Rathour 33 (28); Sanjay Yadav 2/14 (4 overs)

Bihar won by 6 wickets
Sri Sivasubramaniya Nadar College of Engineering Ground, Chennai
Umpires: K Prabhakar Rao and Pashchim Pathak

- Bihar won the toss and elected to field.
- Akash Raj and Anuj Raj (Bihar) both made their T20 debuts.

15 January 2021
Scorecard

Chandigarh; 200/3 (20 overs)	v	Mizoram; 111/6 (20 overs)
Manan Vohra 85 (44); Sumit Lama 2/38 (4 overs)		Pratik Desai 27 (22); Gaurav Gambhir 3/11 (4 overs)

Chandigarh won by 89 runs
Sri Ramachandra Medical College Ground, Chennai
Umpires: Mohamad Rafi and Prahlad Rawat

- Chandigarh won the toss and elected to bat.
- Jagjit Singh (Chandigarh) made his T20 debut.

15 January 2021
Scorecard

Nagaland; 176/4 (20 overs)	v	Sikkim; 76 (14.2 overs)
Rongsen Jonathan 56 (39); Ajay Pradhan 2/34 (4 overs)		Anureet Singh 41 (26); Khrievitso Kense 3/27 (3.2 overs)

Nagaland won by 100 runs
India Cement Limited Guru Nanak College Ground, Chennai
Umpires: Madanagopal Kuppuraj and Rajeev Godara

- Sikkim won the toss and elected to field.
- Ajay Pradhan (Sikkim) made his T20 debut.

15 January 2021
Scorecard

Manipur; 149/8 (20 overs)	v	Arunachal Pradesh; 104 (19.4 overs)
Langlonyamba Keishangbam 29 (34); Techi Doria 3/29 (4 overs)		Rahul Dalal 29 (27); Bishworjit Konthoujam 2/12 (3.4 overs)

Manipur won by 45 runs
TI Cycles Ground, Chennai
Umpires: Krishnaraj Srinath and Subrat Das

- Manipur won the toss and elected to bat.
- Faruque Hussain (Arunachal Pradesh) made his T20 debut.

=== Round 4 ===
17 January 2021
Scorecard

Nagaland; 178/6 (20 overs)	v	Mizoram; 101 (19.1 overs)
Rongsen Jonathan 51 (32); Pratik Desai 2/19 (4 overs)		Lalhmangaiha 39 (41); Nagaho Chishi 3/12 (4 overs)

Nagaland won by 77 runs
Sri Sivasubramaniya Nadar College of Engineering Ground, Chennai
Umpires: Madanagopal Kuppuraj and Rajeev Godara

- Nagaland won the toss and elected to bat.
- Chopise Hopongkyu (Nagaland) made his T20 debut.

17 January 2021
Scorecard

Manipur; 105/8 (20 overs)	v	Bihar; 107/1 (17.1 overs)
Rex Rajkumar 29 (29); Amod Yadav 4/17 (4 overs)		Shasheem Rathour 60* (40); Nongthombam Denin 1/14 (3 overs)

Bihar won by 9 wickets
Sri Ramachandra Medical College Ground, Chennai
Umpires: Chirra Ravikanthreddy and Somnath Jha

- Bihar won the toss and elected to field.
- Nongthombam Denin and Nongthombam Sarojkumar (Manipur) both made their T20 debuts.

17 January 2021
Scorecard

Arunachal Pradesh; 84/8 (20 overs)	v	Meghalaya; 88/1 (14.5 overs)
Akhilesh Sahani 41* (33); Abhay Negi 2/10 (4 overs)		Dwaraka Ravi Teja 36* (44); Rakesh Kumar 1/22 (3.5 overs)

Meghalaya won by 9 wickets
TI Cycles Ground, Chennai
Umpires: K Prabhakar Rao and Pashchim Pathak

- Arunachal Pradesh won the toss and elected to bat.
- Namam Tatang (Arunachal Pradesh) and Rohit Shah (Meghalaya) both made their T20 debuts.

17 January 2021
Scorecard

Chandigarh; 204/6 (20 overs)	v	Sikkim; 73/4 (20 overs)
Shivam Bhambri 75 (46); Nitesh Gupta 2/23 (4 overs)		Varun Sood 34* (39); Bipul Sharma 2/5 (3 overs)

Chandigarh won by 131 runs
India Cement Limited Guru Nanak College Ground, Chennai
Umpires: Mohamad Rafi and Prahlad Rawat

- Chandigarh won the toss and elected to bat.
- Arslan Khan, Bhagmender Lather (Chandigarh) and Nitesh Gupta (Sikkim) all made their T20 debuts.

=== Round 5 ===
19 January 2021
Scorecard

Arunachal Pradesh; 56/8 (20 overs)	v	Chandigarh; 61/3 (7.1 overs)
Nazeeb Saiyed 19 (32); Bipul Sharma 3/5 (4 overs)		Arslan Khan 37 (19); Nabam Tempol 2/5 (2 overs)

Chandigarh won by 7 wickets
India Cement Limited Guru Nanak College Ground, Chennai
Umpires: Krishnaraj Srinath and Subrat Das

- Arunachal Pradesh won the toss and elected to bat.

19 January 2021
Scorecard

Sikkim; 111/5 (20 overs)	v	Meghalaya; 112/2 (17.3 overs)
Varun Sood 60* (50); Sanjay Yadav 2/24 (4 overs)		Puneet Bisht 41* (27); Nitesh Gupta 1/17 (3 overs)

Meghalaya won by 8 wickets
Sri Ramachandra Medical College Ground, Chennai
Umpires: Chirra Ravikanthreddy and Somnath Jha

- Meghalaya won the toss and elected to field.
- Bhushan Subba (Sikkim) made his T20 debut.

19 January 2021
Scorecard

Mizoram; 83/8 (20 overs)	v	Bihar; 84/4 (12.4 overs)
Taruwar Kohli 33 (30); Ashutosh Aman 4/9 (4 overs)		Babul Kumar 37* (34); Bobby Zothansanga 1/15 (3.4 overs)

Bihar won by 6 wickets
Sri Sivasubramaniya Nadar College of Engineering Ground, Chennai
Umpires: K Prabhakar Rao and Pashchim Pathak

- Bihar won the toss and elected to field.
- Mohit Kumar (Bihar) made his T20 debut.

19 January 2021
Scorecard

Manipur; 129/8 (20 overs)	v	Nagaland; 131/2 (17.1 overs)
Langlonyamba Keishangbam 50* (48); Stuart Binny 3/27 (4 overs)		Chetan Bist 60 (43); Ajay Lamabam 1/30 (3.1 overs)

Nagaland won by 8 wickets
TI Cycles Ground, Chennai
Umpires: Mohamad Rafi and Prahlad Rawat

- Manipur won the toss and elected to bat.
- Gemson Singh (Manipur) made his T20 debut.
