= Nongthombam =

Nongthombam (sometimes shortened to Nongthomba or Nong) is a Meitei family name. Notable people with this surname are:

- Nongthombam Biren Singh, 12th Chief Minister of Manipur
- Nongthombam Shri Biren, Indian writer
- Nongthombam Ajit Singh, Indian cricketer
- Nongthombam Denin, Indian cricketer
- Nongthombam Sarojkumar, Indian cricketer
