= Varun Sood =

Varun Sood may refer to:

- Varun Sood (cricketer)
- Varun Sood (actor)
