= Mohit Kumar =

Mohit Kumar can refer to:

- Mohit Kumar (actor), Indian actor
- Mohit Kumar (cricketer, born 1996), Indian cricketer
- Mohit Kumar (Bihar cricketer) (born 1998), Indian cricketer
- Mohit Kumar, Indian businessperson, co-founder of Ultrahuman
