= Gelson Singh =

Indian cricketer (born 1994)

Personal information
- Full name: Thoudam Gelson Singh
- Born: 1 February 1994 (age 32); Imphal, Manipur
- Source: ESPNcricinfo, 25 December 2019

Thoudam Gelson Singh (born 1 February 1994) is an Indian cricketer. He made his first-class debut on 25 December 2019, for Manipur in the 2019–20 Ranji Trophy. He made his List A debut on 27 February 2021, for Manipur in the 2020–21 Vijay Hazare Trophy.
