= Rajjakuddin Ahmed =

Indian cricketer (born 1995)

Personal information
- Full name: Rajjakuddin Kutubuddin Ahmed
- Born: 2 September 1995 (age 31); Tezpur, Sonitpur, Assam, India
- Batting: Right-handed
- Bowling: Right-arm medium
- Role: All-rounder

Domestic team information
- Years: Team
- 2017/18–present: Assam
- Source: Cricinfo, 20 February 2021

Rajjakuddin Ahmed (Assamese: ৰাজ্জাকউদ্দিন আহমেদ, Assamese pronunciation: [rad͡ʒːakudːin aɦmed]; born 2 September 1995) is an Indian cricketer. He made his first-class debut for Assam in the 2017–18 Ranji Trophy on 9 November 2017. He made his Twenty20 debut for Assam in the 2017–18 Zonal T20 League on 8 January 2018. He made his List A debut on 21 February 2021, for Assam in the 2020–21 Vijay Hazare Trophy.
