= Golden Lalchhuanmawia =

Indian cricketer (born 1985)

Personal information
- Born: 24 March 1985 (age 41)
- Source: ESPNcricinfo, 1 March 2021

Golden Lalchhuanmawia (born 24 March 1985) is an Indian cricketer. He made his List A debut on 1 March 2021, for Mizoram in the 2020–21 Vijay Hazare Trophy.
