= Chingakham Ranjan =

Indian cricketer (born 1997)

Personal information
- Full name: Chingakham Ranjan Singh
- Born: 2 February 1997 (age 29); Imphal East, Manipur
- Source: ESPNcricinfo, 27 February 2021

Chingakham Ranjan Singh (born 2 February 1997) is an Indian cricketer who has represented Manipur in Indian domestic cricket.

== Career ==
Ranjan made his List A debut on 27 February 2021 for Manipur in the 2020–21 Vijay Hazare Trophy. In that match, he was included in Manipur's playing XI.
