= Guru Nanak College, Chennai =

Post graduate institute in Chennai, Tamil Nadu, India

Guru Nanak College
- Motto: Pro Bono Publico
- Motto in English: Benefit of All
- Type: Autonomous (Government aided)
- Established: 1971
- Founder: Lt. Col. G.S. Gill
- Parent institution: Guru Nanak Educational Society
- Affiliations: University of Madras
- Chairman: Sardar Manjit Singh Nayar
- Principal: Dr. R. M. Ezhilarasi
- Location: Velachery, Chennai, Tamil Nadu, India
- Campus: 25 acres
- Website: https://gurunanakcollege.edu.in/

Guru Nanak College is an autonomous institution affiliated to University of Madras located in Velachery, Chennai, Tamil Nadu, India.

== History ==
Guru Nanak college was established in 1971 by Lt. Col. G.S. Gill as a part of the Guru Nanak Educational Society to commemorate the 500th birth anniversary of Guru Nanak, founder of Sikhism. It is affiliated to University of Madras, Chennai. It is a co-educational grant-in-aid institution managed by the Guru Nanak Educational Society.

== Campus ==
The college is situated on a 25-acre campus located between Raj Bhavan and IIT-Madras, facing Guru Nanak Salai. The campus includes several academic blocks with classrooms, lecture halls, a library, laboratories, and faculty offices.

The college has an auditorium with audio-visual facilities to host seminars, conferences, cultural events, and other functions. It also has a cafeteria for students and staff.

The college has implemented eco-friendly initiatives, such as rainwater harvesting, solar power installations, and maintaining green cover with landscaped gardens and tree plantations.

== Hostel ==
Guru Nanak College provides hostel facilities for both boys and girls, with wi-fi, study rooms and mess facilities.

== Langar kitchen ==
Guru Nanak College houses a Gurdwara (worship place for Sikhs) with an attached Langar kitchen, constructed by the General Secretary and Correspondent, Mr. Manjit Singh Nayar. Since 2014, the Langar kitchen has been serving free meals to the college community. The Langar kitchen operates every working day of the college, providing around 700 meals daily to students and staff.

== Courses ==
The college offer 32 under graduate programmes, 10 post graduate programmes and doctoral programme. The college was ranked 62nd in science category and 94th in arts by India Today in 2023.

== Ranking ==
The college is ranked 89th among colleges in India by the National Institutional Ranking Framework (NIRF) in 2024.

India university ranking

== Sports facilities ==
The college has sports facilities, including a playground for outdoor sports such as cricket, football, and athletics. There are also courts for basketball, volleyball, and tennis. Indoor sports facilities include a gymnasium and spaces for table tennis and other indoor games.

== Cricket ground ==
The college is home to Guru Nanak College Ground. The cricket ground has hosted domestic matches for Board of Control for Cricket in India since 1978. It has hosted Ranji Trophy matches since 1996 for Tamil Nadu, a Women's One Day International in 2002 and warm-up matches for the 2016 ICC Women's World Twenty20.

== Notable alumni ==
Notable alumni include Indian international cricketers Sadagoppan Ramesh, Subramaniam Badrinath, Vidyut Sivaramakrishnan, domestic cricketers Baba Indrajith, Ragupathy Silambarasan, Baba Aparajith and squash player Abhay Singh.
