= Dinesh Dhobi =

Indian cricketer (born 1999)

Personal information
- Full name: Dinesh Kumar Dhobi
- Born: 15 February 1999 (age 27); Gangtok, Sikkim
- Source: ESPNcricinfo, 25 February 2021

Dinesh Dhobi (born 15 February 1999) is an Indian cricketer. He made his List A debut on 25 February 2021, for Sikkim in the 2020–21 Vijay Hazare Trophy.
