= England women's cricket team in India in 2017–18 =

International cricket tour

	India women	England women
- Dates: 3 – 12 April 2018
Captains	Mithali Raj	Heather Knight (Note: Anya Shrubsole captained England in the first WODI.)

One Day International series
- Results: India women won the 3-match series 2–1
Most runs	Smriti Mandhana (181)	Amy Jones (94)
Most wickets	Poonam Yadav (6)	Sophie Ecclestone (8)
- Player of the series: Smriti Mandhana (Ind)

The England women's cricket team played the India women's cricket team in April 2018. The tour consisted of three Women's One Day Internationals (WODIs). The matches followed a tri-series in India, which also featured the Australia women's cricket team. India won the series 2–1.

Unlike other WODI matches, these fixtures did not form part of the 2017–20 ICC Women's Championship. Instead, the fixtures were used to give India more match practice in the run-up to the 2021 Women's Cricket World Cup. Ahead of the WODI fixtures, England Women played a warm-up match against India A Women, with all four matches taking place in Nagpur.

During the first fixture, India's captain, Mithali Raj, played in her 192nd match, becoming the most capped player in WODIs. In the third and final match, she scored her 50th half-century in WODIs. It was the 56th time she had made a score of fifty or more, a new record in WODIs.

== Squads ==
India	England
Mithali Raj (c); Harmanpreet Kaur (vc); Ekta Bisht; Rajeshwari Gayakwad; Jhulan Goswami; Dayalan Hemalatha; Veda Krishnamurthy; Smriti Mandhana; Shikha Pandey; Jemimah Rodrigues; Deepti Sharma; Devika Vaidya; Pooja Vastrakar; Sushma Verma (wk); Poonam Yadav	Heather Knight (c); Tammy Beaumont; Kate Cross; Alice Davidson-Richards; Sophie Ecclestone; Georgia Elwiss; Tash Farrant; Katie George; Jenny Gunn; Alex Hartley; Danielle Hazell; Amy Jones (wk); Anya Shrubsole; Bryony Smith; Nat Sciver; Fran Wilson; Danni Wyatt

Ahead of the first match, Georgia Elwiss was added to England's squad, as cover for Heather Knight.

== Tour match ==
=== 50-over match: India A Women v England Women ===
3 April 2018
09:00
Scorecard

India A 211/4 (50 overs)	v	England; 252 (49.2 overs)
Devika Vaidya 104 (150); Sophie Ecclestone 2/24 (8 overs)		Tammy Beaumont 52 (76); Anuja Patil 3/33 (7.2 overs)

England Women won by 4 wickets
Vidarbha Cricket Association Stadium, Nagpur
Umpires: Suresh Dhote (Ind) and Prahlad Rawat (Ind)

- India A Women won the toss and elected to bat.
- 15 players per side (11 batting, 11 fielding).

== WODI series ==
=== 1st WODI ===
6 April 2018
09:00
Scorecard

England; 207 (49.3 overs)	v	India; 209/9 (49.1 overs)
Fran Wilson 45 (78); Poonam Yadav 4/30 (10 overs)		Smriti Mandhana 86 (109); Sophie Ecclestone 4/37 (10 overs)

India Women won by 1 wicket
Vidarbha Cricket Association Stadium, Nagpur
Umpires: Pashchim Pathak (Ind) and Tapan Sharma (Ind)
Player of the match: Smriti Mandhana (Ind)

- England Women won the toss and elected to bat.
- Alice Davidson-Richards (Eng) made her WODI debut.
- Anya Shrubsole captained England Women for the first time in WODIs.

=== 2nd WODI ===
9 April 2018
09:00
Scorecard

India; 113 (37.2 overs)	v	England; 117/2 (29 overs)
Smriti Mandhana 42 (57); Sophie Ecclestone 4/14 (10 overs)		Danni Wyatt 47 (43); Ekta Bisht 2/44 (9 overs)

England Women won by 8 wickets
Vidarbha Cricket Association Stadium, Nagpur
Umpires: Nikhil Patwardhan (Ind) and Sivasubramaniyan Shankar (Ind)
Player of the match: Sophie Ecclestone (Eng)

- India Women won the toss and elected to bat.

=== 3rd WODI ===
12 April 2018
09:00
Scorecard

England; 201/9 (50 overs)	v	India; 202/2 (45.2 overs)
Amy Jones 94 (119); Rajeshwari Gayakwad 2/32 (10 overs)		Mithali Raj 74* (124); Anya Shrubsole 2/37 (8 overs)

India Women won by 8 wickets
Vidarbha Cricket Association Stadium, Nagpur
Umpires: Pashchim Pathak (Ind) and Tapan Sharma (Ind)
Player of the match: Deepti Sharma (Ind)

- England Women won the toss and elected to bat.
- Mithali Raj (Ind) scored her 50th half-century in WODIs.
