= Moses Ramhlunmawia =

Indian cricketer (born 1991)

Personal information
- Born: 18 January 1991 (age 35)
- Source: ESPNcricinfo, 25 February 2021

Moses Ramhlunmawia (born 18 January 1991) is an Indian cricketer. He made his List A debut on 25 February 2021, for Mizoram in the 2020–21 Vijay Hazare Trophy.
