= Techi Kagung =

Indian cricketer (born 1987)

Personal information
- Full name: Techi Tate Kagung
- Born: 3 October 1987 (age 39); Papum Pare, Arunachal Pradesh
- Source: Cricinfo, 1 March 2021

Techi Kagung (born 3 October 1987) is an Indian cricketer. He made his List A debut on 1 March 2021, for Arunachal Pradesh in the 2020–21 Vijay Hazare Trophy. He made his first-class debut on 24 February 2022, for Arunachal Pradesh in the 2021–22 Ranji Trophy.
