= 2018–19 Vinoo Mankad Trophy =

Cricket tournament

- Dates: 5 October – 4 November 2018
- Administrator(s): BCCI
- Cricket format: Limited overs cricket
- Tournament format(s): Round-robin and Playoff format
- Host(s): Various
- Champions: Vidarbha U19
- Runners-up: Tamil Nadu U19
- Participants: 35
- Matches: 143
- Most runs: Piyush Kumar Singh (534), Tilak Varma (507)
- Most wickets: Rohit Dattatraya (28), Rex Singh (26)

The 2018–19 Vinoo Mankad Trophy is the current season of the Vinoo Mankad Trophy, an Under-19s Limited overs cricket tournament in India.

It is being contested by 35 domestic cricket teams of India, starting on 5 October 2018, ahead of the 2018–19 Ranji Trophy. The tournament has four groups, with nine teams in Elite Groups A and B, and eight teams in Elite Group C. All the new teams were placed in the Plate Group. All the Elite Group A matches is being hosted in Surat by Surat District Cricket Association, affiliated to Gujarat Cricket Association from 5–24 October 2018.

== Teams ==
The teams were drawn in the following groups:

EliteGroup A

- Assam
- Bengal
- Gujarat
- Jharkhand
- Karnataka
- Madhya Pradesh
- Maharashtra
- Mumbai
- Uttar Pradesh

Elite Group B

- Andhra
- Baroda
- Chhattisgarh
- Delhi
- Haryana
- Hyderabad
- Punjab
- Tripura
- Vidarbha

Elite Group C

- Goa
- Himachal Pradesh
- Jammu and Kashmir
- Kerala
- Odisha
- Rajasthan
- Saurashtra
- Tamil Nadu

Plate Group

- Arunachal Pradesh
- Bihar
- Manipur
- Meghalaya
- Mizoram
- Nagaland
- Puducherry
- Sikkim
- Uttarakhand

== Statistics ==
=== Most runs ===
Player	Team	Mat	Inns	Runs	Ave	SR	HS	100	50	4s	6s
Piyush Kumar Singh	Bihar	7	7	534	106.80	80.18	145	2	3	59	3
Tilak Varma	Hyderabad	8	8	507	84.50	71.91	102*	1	4	52	1
Rahul Chandrol	Madhya Pradesh	9	9	471	58.88	96.31	102	1	4	45	2
Last updated: 29 March 2015

=== Most wickets ===
Player	Team	Mat	Inns	Wkts	Ave	Econ	BBI	SR
Rohit Dattatraya	Vidarbha	11	11	28	17.57	4.53	5/37	23.25
Rex Singh	Manipur	7	7	26	6.34	3.17	8/3	12.00
Amit Shukla	Punjab	8	8	22	12.22	3.49	6/47	21.00
Last updated: 23 November 2018
