= Merenka Jamir =

Indian cricketer (born 1998)

Personal information
- Born: 10 May 1998 (age 28); Mokokchung, Nagaland
- Source: ESPNcricinfo, 27 February 2021

Merenka Jamir (born 10 May 1998) is an Indian cricketer. He made his List A debut on 27 February 2021, for Nagaland in the 2020–21 Vijay Hazare Trophy.
