= Techi Sonam =

Indian cricketer (born 1997)

Personal information
- Born: 5 June 1997 (age 29)
- Source: Cricinfo, 21 February 2021

Techi Sonam (born 5 June 1997) is an Indian cricketer. He made his List A debut on 21 February 2021, for Arunachal Pradesh in the 2020–21 Vijay Hazare Trophy. He made his Twenty20 debut on 4 November 2021, for Arunachal Pradesh in the 2021–22 Syed Mushtaq Ali Trophy.
