= Chongtham Mehul =

Indian cricketer (born 1989)

Personal information
- Full name: Chongtham Mehul Shreth Singh
- Born: 10 February 1989 (age 37)
- Source: ESPNcricinfo, 1 March 2021

Chongtham Mehul Shreth Singh (born 10 February 1989) is an Indian cricketer. He made his List A debut on 1 March 2021, for Manipur against Meghalaya in the 2020–21 Vijay Hazare Trophy. He made his Twenty20 debut on 8 November 2021, for Manipur against Vidarbhain the 2021–22 Syed Mushtaq Ali Trophy. He made his first-class debut on 16 February 2024, for Manipur against Saurashtra in the 2023–24 Ranji Trophy.
