= Narisingh Yadav =

Indian cricketer (born 1992)

Personal information
- Full name: Kshetrimayum Narisingh Yadav
- Born: 3 March 1992 (age 34); Imphal, Manipur
- Batting: Right handed
- Role: Wicketkeeper

Domestic team information
- Years: Team
- 2018–19: Manipur
- Source: ESPNcricinfo, 1 November 2018

Kshetrimayum Narisingh Yadav (born 3 March 1992) is an Indian cricketer. He made his first-class debut for Manipur in the 2018–19 Ranji Trophy on 1 November 2018. He made his Twenty20 debut for Manipur in the 2018–19 Syed Mushtaq Ali Trophy on 21 February 2019. He made his List A debut on 21 February 2021, for Manipur in the 2020–21 Vijay Hazare Trophy.
