= Takam Tallam =

Indian cricketer (born 1995)

Personal information
- Full name: Takam Tallam
- Born: 15 July 1995 (age 31); Papum Pare, Arunachal Pradesh
- Batting: Left-handed
- Role: Batter

Domestic team information
- Years: Team
- 2019/20: Arunachal Pradesh
- Source: CricketArchive (subscription required), 24 November 2023

Takam Tallam (born 15 July 1995) is an Indian cricketer who made his first-class debut on 19 January 2020, playing for Arunachal Pradesh in the 2019–20 Ranji Trophy. He made his Twenty20 debut for Arunachal Pradesh on 11 January 2021, in the 2020–21 Syed Mushtaq Ali Trophy. He has made three appearances in each of the Ranji Trophy and the Syed Mushtaq Ali Trophy.
