= Nazeeb Saiyed =

Indian cricketer (born 1995)

Personal information
- Full name: Nazeeb Nadimbhai Saiyed
- Born: 1 December 1995 (age 30); Banaskantha, Gujarat
- Source: ESPNcricinfo, 11 January 2021

Nazeeb Saiyed (born 1 December 1995) is an Indian cricketer. He made his Twenty20 debut on 11 January 2021, for Arunachal Pradesh in the 2020–21 Syed Mushtaq Ali Trophy. He made his List A debut on 21 February 2021, for Arunachal Pradesh in the 2020–21 Vijay Hazare Trophy. He made his first-class debut on 17 February 2022, for Arunachal Pradesh in the 2021–22 Ranji Trophy.
