= Rajiv Darjee =

Indian cricketer (born 1991)

Personal information
- Full name: Rajiv Malay Darjee
- Born: 30 June 1991 (age 35); Mangan, Sikkim, India
- Source: Cricinfo, 13 January 2021

Rajiv Darjee (born 30 June 1991) is an Indian cricketer. He made his Twenty20 debut on 13 January 2021, for Sikkim in the 2020–21 Syed Mushtaq Ali Trophy. He made his List A debut on 21 February 2021, for Sikkim in the 2020–21 Vijay Hazare Trophy.
