= Gemson Singh =

Indian cricketer (born 1995)

Personal information
- Full name: Gemson Mutun Singh
- Born: 13 March 1995 (age 31)
- Source: ESPNcricinfo, 4 February 2020

Gemson Mutun Singh (born 13 March 1995) is an Indian cricketer. He made his first-class debut on 4 February 2020, for Manipur in the 2019–20 Ranji Trophy. He made his Twenty20 debut on 19 January 2021, for Manipur in the 2020–21 Syed Mushtaq Ali Trophy.
