= Prahlad Rawat =

Indian cricketer (born 1970)

Personal information
- Full name: Prahlad Singh Rawat
- Born: 14 October 1970 (age 56); Nagpur, Maharashtra, India

Prahlad Rawat (born 14 October 1970) is an Indian former cricketer. He played in 48 first-class and 23 List A matches between 1987 and 2001. He is now an umpire, and stood in a tour match between India A Women and England Women in April 2018.
