= Rakesh Kumar (cricketer) =

Indian cricketer (born 1992)

Personal information
- Full name: Rakesh Ram Kumar
- Born: 3 January 1992 (age 34)
- Batting: Right-handed
- Bowling: Right-arm offbreak
- Source: Cricinfo, 4 February 2020

Rakesh Kumar (born 3 January 1992) is an Indian cricketer. He made his first-class debut on 4 February 2020, for Arunachal Pradesh in the 2019–20 Ranji Trophy. In the match, he and Rahul Dalal shared a 74-run partnership for the 7th wicket against Bihar. It was the fifth-known instance of a fifty-plus partnership in first-class cricket with one batsman scoring all the runs. He made his Twenty20 debut on 11 January 2021, for Arunachal Pradesh in the 2020–21 Syed Mushtaq Ali Trophy. He made his List A debut on 21 February 2021, for Arunachal Pradesh in the 2020–21 Vijay Hazare Trophy.
