= Khrievitso Kense =

Indian cricketer (born 2004)

Personal information
- Full name: Khrievitso Atuo U Kense
- Born: 6 March 2004 (age 22); Kohima, Nagaland
- Source: ESPNcricinfo, 13 January 2021

Khrievitso Kense (born 6 March 2004) is an Indian cricketer.

He made his Twenty20 debut on 13 January 2021, for Nagaland in the 2020–21 Syed Mushtaq Ali Trophy. Following his debut, he was invited by the Mumbai Indians to take part in bowling trials ahead of the 2021 Indian Premier League. He made his List A debut on 21 February 2021, for Nagaland in the 2020–21 Vijay Hazare Trophy. He made his first-class debut on 17 February 2022, for Nagaland in the 2021–22 Ranji Trophy.
