= Rohit Shah =

Indian cricketer (born 1997)

Personal information
- Born: 10 March 2000 (age 26); Ri-Bhoi, Meghalaya
- Source: Cricinfo, 17 January 2021

Rohit Shah (born 27 December 1997) is an Indian cricketer. He made his Twenty20 debut on 17 January 2021, for Meghalaya in the 2020–21 Syed Mushtaq Ali Trophy. He made his List A debut on 21 February 2021, for Meghalaya in the 2020–21 Vijay Hazare Trophy.
