= Manvan Patel =

Indian cricketer (born 2000)

Manav Patel
Personal information
- Full name: Manav Kamal Patel
- Born: 23 February 2000 (age 26); Valsad, Gujarat
- Source: ESPNcricinfo, 11 January 2021

Manav Patel (born 23 February 2000) is an Indian cricketer. He made his Twenty20 debut on 11 January 2021, for Arunachal Pradesh in the 2020–21 Syed Mushtaq Ali Trophy. He made his List A debut on 21 February 2021, for Arunachal Pradesh in the 2020–21 Vijay Hazare Trophy. He made his first-class debut on 17 February 2022, for Arunachal Pradesh in the 2021–22 Ranji Trophy.
