= Yogesh Tiwari =

Indian cricketer (born 1997)

Personal information
- Born: 8 November 1997 (age 29); Shillong, Meghalaya
- Source: Cricinfo, 11 January 2021

Yogesh Tiwari (born 8 November 1997) is an Indian cricketer. He made his Twenty20 debut on 11 January 2021, for Meghalaya in the 2020–21 Syed Mushtaq Ali Trophy. He made his List A debut on 21 February 2021, for Meghalaya in the 2020–21 Vijay Hazare Trophy.
