= Faruque Hussain =

Indian cricketer (born 1995)

Personal information
- Full name: Makhbullah Faruque Hussain
- Born: 10 January 1995 (age 31); Papum Pare, Arunachal Pradesh
- Source: ESPNcricinfo, 15 January 2021

Faruque Hussain (born 10 January 1995) is an Indian cricketer. He made his Twenty20 debut on 15 January 2021, for Arunachal Pradesh in the 2020–21 Syed Mushtaq Ali Trophy.
