= Hem Chetri =

Indian cricketer (born 2000)

Personal information
- Full name: Hem Bahadur Chetri
- Born: 23 September 2000 (age 26); Amboto, Nagaland
- Batting: Right-handed
- Bowling: Right-arm offbreak

Domestic team information
- Years: Team
- 2020/21-present: Nagaland

Career statistics
Competition	FC	LA	T20
Matches	9	17	12
Runs scored	414	296	59
Batting average	29.57	29.60	9.83
100s/50s	0/5	0/2	0/0
Top score	90	82*	25*
Balls bowled	134	62	42
Wickets	3	3	2
Bowling average	35.66	22.33	34.50
5 wickets in innings	0	0	0
10 wickets in match	0	0	0
Best bowling	1/6	3/29	1/9
Catches/stumpings	3/–	19/–	9/–
- Source: ESPNcricinfo, 12 September 2025

Hem Chetri (born 23 September 2000) is an Indian cricketer. He made his Twenty20 debut on 13 January 2021, for Nagaland in the 2020–21 Syed Mushtaq Ali Trophy. He made his List A debut on 21 February 2021, for Nagaland in the 2020–21 Vijay Hazare Trophy.
