= Mohammad Ronak =

Indian cricketer (born 1997)

Personal information
- Born: 15 February 1997 (age 29); Gangtok, Sikkim
- Source: ESPNcricinfo, 21 February 2021

Mohammad Ronak (born 15 February 1997) is an Indian cricketer. He made his Twenty20 debut on 11 January 2021, for Sikkim in the 2020–21 Syed Mushtaq Ali Trophy.
