= Nabam Tatang =

Indian cricketer (born 1997)

Personal information
- Full name: Nabam Rui Tatang
- Born: 10 July 1997 (age 29); Papum Pare, Arunachal Pradesh
- Source: ESPNcricinfo, 17 January 2021

Nabam Tatang (born 10 July 1997) is an Indian cricketer. He made his Twenty20 debut on 17 January 2021, for Arunachal Pradesh in the 2020–21 Syed Mushtaq Ali Trophy.
