= Nongthombam Sarojkumar =

Indian cricketer (born 1994)

Personal information
- Full name: Nongthombam Sarojkumar Singh
- Born: 3 February 1994 (age 32); Imphal West, Manipur
- Source: ESPNcricinfo, 17 January 2021

Nongthombam Sarojkumar Singh (born 3 February 1994) is an Indian cricketer. He made his Twenty20 debut on 17 January 2021, for Manipur in the 2020–21 Syed Mushtaq Ali Trophy.
