= Guru Nanak College Ground =

Cricket ground

Ground information
- Location: Velachery, Chennai, India
- Coordinates: 12.992032°N 80.2210677°E
- Establishment: 1971
- Capacity: 3000
- Owner: Guru Nanak College, Chennai

International information
- Only WODI: 6 January 2002: India v England

Team information
1995-present	(Tamil Nadu)
- As of 9 September 2020; Source: CricketArchive

Guru Nanak College Ground is a cricket ground located in the Guru Nanak College premises in Velachery, Chennai. It is named after the Guru Nanak, the founder of Sikhism when the college was established in 1971 on the 500th birth anniversary of Guru Nanak.

The ground has been used for first class cricket since 1978. It has hosted Ranji Trophy matches since 1996 for Tamil Nadu and a Women's One Day International in 2002. It is one of the venues for hosting warm-up matches for the 2016 ICC Women's World Twenty20.

== See also ==
- List of cricket grounds in India
- Sport in India
