= Nongthombam Denin =

Indian cricketer (born 1997)

Personal information
- Full name: Nongthombam Denin Singh
- Born: 1 January 1997 (age 29); Imphal East, Manipur, India
- Source: ESPNcricinfo, 17 January 2021

Nongthombam Denin Singh (born 1 January 1997) is an Indian cricketer. He made his Twenty20 debut on 17 January 2021, for Manipur in the 2020–21 Syed Mushtaq Ali Trophy. He made his List A debut on 27 February 2021, for Manipur in the 2020–21 Vijay Hazare Trophy.
