= Rahul Dalal =

Indian cricketer (born 1992)

Personal information
- Full name: Rahul Ranbirsingh Dalal
- Born: 2 February 1992 (age 34); Faridabad, Haryana, India
- Batting: Right-handed
- Bowling: Right arm off break
- Role: Batsman

Career statistics
Competition	FC	LA	T20
Matches	34	18	26
Runs scored	2407	903	470
Batting average	42.22	69.46	22.38
100s/50s	7/8	2/7	0/2
Top score	267*	138*	75
Catches/stumpings	22/4	8/-	6/3
- Source: Cricinfo, 16 May 2021

Rahul Dalal (born 2 February 1992) is an Indian cricketer who plays for Arunachal Pradesh. He was the leading run-scorer in the 2019–20 Ranji Trophy, with 1,340 runs in nine matches, and the only batsman to score more than 1,000 runs in the tournament. In a Ranji Trophy match against Bihar, he and Rakesh Kumar shared a 74-run partnership for the 7th wicket. It was the fifth-known instance of a fifty-plus partnership in first-class cricket with one batsman scoring all the runs.
