= Mohit Kumar (Bihar cricketer) =

Indian cricketer (born 1998)

Personal information
- Born: 10 November 1998 (age 28)
- Source: ESPNcricinfo, 19 January 2021

Mohit Kumar (born 10 November 1998) is an Indian cricketer. He made his Twenty20 debut on 19 January 2021, for Bihar in the 2020–21 Syed Mushtaq Ali Trophy.
