= Nitesh Gupta =

Indian cricketer (born 1993)

Personal information
- Full name: Nitesh Kumar Gupta
- Born: 12 May 1993 (age 33); Jorethang, Sikkim
- Batting: Right handed
- Bowling: Right arm fast medium

Domestic team information
- Years: Team
- 2019–20: Sikkim
- Source: ESPNcricinfo, 24 September 2019

Nitesh Gupta (born 12 May 1993) is an Indian cricketer. He made his List A debut on 24 September 2019, for Sikkim in the 2019–20 Vijay Hazare Trophy. He made his first-class debut on 19 January 2020, for Sikkim in the 2019–20 Ranji Trophy. He made his Twenty20 debut on 17 January 2021, for Sikkim in the 2020–21 Syed Mushtaq Ali Trophy.
