= Rex Rajkumar =

Indian cricketer (born 2000)

Personal information
- Full name: Rex Rajkumar Singh
- Born: 30 August 2000 (age 26); Imphal, Manipur
- Batting: Left-handed
- Bowling: Left-arm fast-medium
- Role: Bowler
- Source: Cricinfo, 19 September 2018

Rex Rajkumar Singh (born 30 August 2000) is an Indian cricketer. He made his List A debut for Manipur in the 2018–19 Vijay Hazare Trophy on 19 September 2018. He made his first-class debut for Manipur in the 2018–19 Ranji Trophy on 1 November 2018.

Singh was the leading wicket-taker during the group stages of Vinoo Mankad Trophy U19 One Day Limited Overs Zonal League 2018-19. He picked up 26 wickets from 7 matches. However, Manipur could not qualify for the next stage and Rohit Dattatraya of VCA emerged as the top wicket-taker overall with 28 wickets from 11 matches. Singh had the best bowling average and strike rate for any player among the 37 teams. In December 2018, he took ten wickets for eleven runs in an innings in the Cooch Behar Trophy.

He made his Twenty20 debut on 8 November 2019, for Manipur in the 2019–20 Syed Mushtaq Ali Trophy. On the opening day of the 2019–20 Ranji Trophy in December 2019, Singh took eight wickets for 22 runs against Mizoram.
