= Varun Sood (cricketer) =

Indian cricketer (born 1990)

Personal information
- Born: 12 October 1990 (age 36); Delhi, India
- Batting: Left-handed
- Bowling: Slow left-arm orthodox
- Role: Bowler

Domestic team information
- Years: Team
- 2012–2020: Delhi
- 2021-: Sikkim

Career statistics
Competition	FC	LA
Matches	18	25
Runs scored	358	121
Batting average	19.88	12.10
100s/50s	0/0	0/0
Top score	41not out	28
Balls bowled	3,109	1,201
Wickets	56	34
Bowling average	24.16	28.05
5 wickets in innings	1	1
10 wickets in match	1	0
Best bowling	6/43	5/84
Catches/stumpings	8/–	9/–
- Source: Cricinfo, 8 October 2019

Varun Sood (born 12 October 1990) is an Indian cricketer who plays for Sikkim in Indian domestic cricket. He is a slow left-arm orthodox bowler.

Sood took three wickets for Delhi in a warmup one-day match against ( England ).
