= 2020–21 Vijay Hazare Trophy =

Indian cricket tournament

- Dates: 20 February – 14 March 2021
- Administrator: BCCI
- Cricket format: List A cricket
- Tournament format(s): Round-robin and Playoff format
- Host: Various
- Champions: Mumbai (4th title)
- Runners-up: Uttar Pradesh
- Most runs: Prithvi Shaw (827) (Mumbai)
- Most wickets: Shivam Sharma (21) (Uttar Pradesh)

The 2020–21 Vijay Hazare Trophy was the 28th edition of the Vijay Hazare Trophy, an annual List A cricket tournament in India. The tournament took place from 20 February to 14 March 2021. Karnataka were the defending champions.

In January 2021, the Board of Control for Cricket in India (BCCI) announced that the tournament would take place after the 2020–21 Ranji Trophy was cancelled due to the COVID-19 pandemic. 38 teams were split into six groups, with six teams in Groups A to E and eight teams in the Plate Group. The top five teams from Groups A to E, along with next two highest ranked teams across those groups advanced to the quarter-finals. The next best ranked team in Groups A to E faced the winner of the Plate Group in the Eliminator, with the winner of that fixture also advancing to the quarter-finals.

On the opening day of the tournament, Jharkhand scored 422/9 against Madhya Pradesh, the highest total by any team in the Vijay Hazare Trophy. This record was broken five days later, when Mumbai made 457/4 against Pondicherry. In the match, Mumbai's Prithvi Shaw scored the highest individual total in the Vijay Hazare Trophy, with 227 not out.

Groups A, B and C all concluded on 28 February 2021, with Gujarat, Andhra Pradesh and Karnataka all winning their respective groups to qualify for the knockout stage of the tournament. The remaining three groups finished on the following day, with Mumbai and Saurashtra winning Groups D and E respectively, and Uttarakhand winning the Plate Group. Uttar Pradesh and Kerala qualified for the knockout stage as the next two best-placed teams, with Delhi facing Uttarakhand in the Eliminator match. Delhi beat Uttarakhand by four wickets in the Eliminator match to join the other seven teams in the quarter-finals.

On day one of the quarter-finals, Gujarat beat Andhra Pradesh by 116 runs, and Karnataka beat Kerala by 80 runs to progress. In the remaining two quarter-final matches, Uttar Pradesh beat Delhi by 46 runs, and Mumbai beat Saurashtra by nine wickets. The first semi-final saw Uttar Pradesh beat Gujarat by five wickets, with Mumbai beating the defending champions Karnataka by 72 runs in the second semi-final. Mumbai won the tournament, to take their fourth title, beating Uttar Pradesh by six wickets in the final.

== League stage ==
=== Group A ===
Team	Pld	W	L	T	NR	Pts	NRR
Gujarat (Q)	5	5	0	0	0	20	+1.278
Baroda	5	4	1	0	0	16	+0.399
Hyderabad	5	3	2	0	0	12	+0.186
Chhattisgarh	5	2	3	0	0	8	+0.069
Goa	5	1	4	0	0	4	–0.778
Tripura	5	0	5	0	0	0	–1.198

- Top team advanced to the Knockout Stage

=== Group B ===
Team	Pld	W	L	T	NR	Pts	NRR
Andhra Pradesh (Q)	5	3	2	0	0	12	+0.732
Tamil Nadu	5	3	2	0	0	12	+0.650
Jharkhand	5	3	2	0	0	12	+0.295
Madhya Pradesh	5	3	2	0	0	12	–0.466
Punjab	5	2	3	0	0	8	–0.083
Vidarbha	5	1	4	0	0	4	–1.078

- Top team advanced to the Knockout Stage

=== Group C ===
Team	Pld	W	L	T	NR	Pts	NRR
Karnataka (Q)	5	4	1	0	0	16	+1.834
Uttar Pradesh (Q)	5	4	1	0	0	16	+1.559
Kerala (Q)	5	4	1	0	0	16	+1.244
Railways	5	2	3	0	0	8	+0.103
Odisha	5	1	4	0	0	4	–1.363
Bihar	5	0	5	0	0	0	–3.494

- Top team advanced to the Knockout Stage

=== Group D ===
Team	Pld	W	L	T	NR	Pts	NRR
Mumbai (Q)	5	5	0	0	0	20	+2.603
Delhi (Q)	5	4	1	0	0	16	+0.507
Maharashtra	5	3	2	0	0	12	+0.879
Rajasthan	5	1	4	0	0	4	–0.900
Himachal Pradesh	5	1	4	0	0	4	–1.223
Pondicherry	5	1	4	0	0	4	–1.880

- Top team advanced to the Knockout Stage

Advanced to the Eliminator

=== Group E ===
Team	Pld	W	L	T	NR	Pts	NRR
Saurashtra (Q)	5	4	1	0	0	16	+0.632
Chandigarh	5	3	2	0	0	12	–0.572
Services	5	2	3	0	0	8	+0.382
Jammu and Kashmir	5	2	3	0	0	8	+0.024
Bengal	5	2	3	0	0	8	–0.171
Haryana	5	2	3	0	0	8	-0.298

- Top team advanced to the Knockout Stage

=== Plate Group ===
Team	Pld	W	L	T	NR	Pts	NRR
Uttarakhand (Q)	5	5	0	0	0	20	+3.273
Assam	5	5	0	0	0	20	+1.909
Meghalaya	5	4	1	0	0	16	+1.110
Nagaland	5	4	1	0	0	16	+0.431
Sikkim	5	1	4	0	0	4	–1.137
Arunachal Pradesh	5	0	4	0	1	2	–2.354
Mizoram	5	0	4	0	1	2	–2.418
Manipur	5	0	5	0	0	0	–1.754

- Top team advanced to the Eliminator

== Knockout stage ==
Quarterfinals
A1	Gujarat	299/7 (50 overs)
B1	Andhra Pradesh	183 (41.2 overs)
D2	Delhi	234 (48.1 overs)
C2	Uttar Pradesh	280/7 (50 overs)
C1	Karnataka	338/3 (50 overs)
C3	Kerala	258 (43.4 overs)
D1	Mumbai	285/1 (41.5 overs)
E1	Saurashtra	284/5 (50 overs)

Semifinals
A1	Gujarat	184 (48.1 overs)
C2	Uttar Pradesh	188/5 (42.4 overs)
C1	Karnataka	250 (42.4 overs)
D1	Mumbai	322 (49.2 overs)

Final
C2	Uttar Pradesh	312/4 (50 overs)
D1	Mumbai	315/4 (41.3 overs)

=== Eliminator ===
Eliminator
7 March 2021
Scorecard

Uttarakhand; 287/8 (50 overs)	v	Delhi; 289/6 (48.3 overs)
Kamal Singh 77 (83); Pradeep Sangwan 3/59 (8 overs)		Anuj Rawat 95* (85); Samad Fallah 2/64 (10 overs)

Delhi won by 4 wickets
Arun Jaitley Stadium, Delhi
Umpires: Nitin Pandit and Pashchim Pathak
Player of the match: Pradeep Sangwan (Delhi)

- Delhi won the toss and elected to field.
- Manjot Kalra (Delhi) made his List A debut.

=== Quarter-finals ===
1st Quarter-final
8 March 2021
Scorecard

Gujarat; 299/7 (50 overs)	v	Andhra Pradesh; 183 (41.2 overs)
Priyank Panchal 134 (131); Harishankar Reddy 3/60 (10 overs)		Ricky Bhui 67 (76); Arzan Nagwaswalla 4/28 (8 overs)

Gujarat won by 116 runs
Arun Jaitley Stadium, Delhi
Umpires: Abhijit Deshmukh and Rohan Pandit
Player of the match: Priyank Panchal (Gujarat)

- Gujarat won the toss and elected to bat.
- Lalith Mohan (Andhra Pradesh) made his List A debut.

2nd Quarter-final
8 March 2021
Scorecard

Karnataka; 338/3 (50 overs)	v	Kerala; 258 (43.4 overs)
Ravikumar Samarth 192 (158); Nedumankuzhy Basil 3/57 (8 overs)		Vathsal Govind 92 (96); Ronit More 5/36 (9 overs)

Karnataka won by 80 runs
Airforce Complex Ground, Delhi
Umpires: Pashchim Pathak and Vineet Kulkarni
Player of the match: Ravikumar Samarth (Karnataka)

- Kerala won the toss and elected to field.

3rd Quarter-final
9 March 2021
Scorecard

Uttar Pradesh; 280/7 (50 overs)	v	Delhi; 234 (48.1 overs)
Upendra Yadav 112 (101); Pradeep Sangwan 2/49 (10 overs)		Lalit Yadav 61 (78); Yash Dayal 3/53 (10 overs)

Uttar Pradesh won by 46 runs
Arun Jaitley Stadium, Delhi
Umpires: Sundaram Ravi and Vineet Kulkarni
Player of the match: Upendra Yadav (Uttar Pradesh)

- Delhi won the toss and elected to field.

4th Quarter-final
9 March 2021
Scorecard

Saurashtra; 284/5 (50 overs)	v	Mumbai; 285/1 (41.5 overs)
Samarth Vyas 90* (71); Shams Mulani 2/51 (10 overs)		Prithvi Shaw 185* (123); Jaydev Unadkat 1/52 (8 overs)

Mumbai won by 9 wickets
Airforce Complex Ground, Delhi
Umpires: Nitin Pandit and Yeshwant Barde
Player of the match: Prithvi Shaw (Mumbai)

- Saurashtra won the toss and elected to bat.
- Aman Hakim Khan and Tanush Kotian (Mumbai) both made their List A debuts.

=== Semi-finals ===
1st Semi-final
11 March 2021
Scorecard

Gujarat; 184 (48.1 overs)	v	Uttar Pradesh; 188/5 (42.4 overs)
Het Patel 60 (87); Yash Dayal 3/34 (9.1 overs)		Akshdeep Nath 71 (104); Chintan Gaja 2/30 (7 overs)

Uttar Pradesh won by 5 wickets
Arun Jaitley Stadium, Delhi
Umpires: Nitin Pandit and Pashchim Pathak
Player of the match: Akshdeep Nath (Uttar Pradesh)

- Gujarat won the toss and elected to bat.

2nd Semi-final
11 March 2021
Scorecard

Mumbai; 322 (49.2 overs)	v	Karnataka; 250 (42.4 overs)
Prithvi Shaw 165 (122); Vijaykumar Vyshak 4/56 (9.2 overs)		Devdutt Padikkal 64 (64); Tanush Kotian 2/23 (10 overs)

Mumbai won by 72 runs
Airforce Complex Ground, Delhi
Umpires: Abhijit Deshmukh and Vineet Kulkarni
Player of the match: Prithvi Shaw (Mumbai)

- Karnataka won the toss and elected to field.

=== Final ===
Final
14 March 2021
Scorecard

Uttar Pradesh; 312/4 (50 overs)	v	Mumbai; 315/4 (41.3 overs)
Madhav Kaushik 158* (156); Tanush Kotian 2/54 (10 overs)		Aditya Tare 118* (107); Sameer Choudhary 1/43 (7 overs)

Mumbai won by 6 wickets
Arun Jaitley Stadium, Delhi
Umpires: Sundaram Ravi and Yeshwant Barde
Player of the match: Aditya Tare (Mumbai)

- Uttar Pradesh won the toss and elected to bat.
